= 10th Canadian Screen Awards =

- Date: 4–10 April 2022
- Hosted by: TallBoyz

Highlights
- Most awards: Film: Scarborough (8); TV: Transplant (8)
- Most nominations: Film: Night Raiders / Scarborough (11); TV: Sort Of (13)
- Best Motion Picture: Scarborough
- Best Dramatic Series: Transplant
- Best Comedy Series: Sort Of

Television/radio coverage
- Network: CBC Television

The 10th Canadian Screen Awards were presented by the Academy of Canadian Cinema and Television from 4–10 April 2022 to honour achievements in Canadian film, television, and digital media production in 2021. The presentations were held as a series of virtual events due to the COVID-19 pandemic, with awards in top categories presented via a CBC Television special on 10 April 2022 hosted by comedy troupe TallBoyz.

Nominations were announced on 15 February. In film, the top nominees were Scarborough and Night Raiders, with 11 nods apiece, while in television the series Sort Of was the leader with 13 nominations. Scarborough and Transplant were tied for most-awarded film and television series, with both receiving 8 awards (including Best Motion Picture and Best Dramatic Series respectively).

== Ceremony information ==
For the third consecutive year, the in-person awards gala was cancelled due to the COVID-19 pandemic. Unlike the previous two ceremonies, the Canadian Screen Awards would return to CBC Television, airing an hour-long special on 10 April 2022 to present the awards in top categories. The special was hosted by the sketch comedy troupe TallBoyz.

The awards in non-televised genre and technical categories were presented via a series of virtual Canadian Screen Week presentations, beginning with broadcast news, documentary, and factual awards on 4 April, sports and digital on 5 April; children's, animation, lifestyle and reality on 6 April, television craft and performance on 7 April, and cinematic arts on 8 April.

Category presenters included Catherine O'Hara, Tatiana Maslany, Sidney Crosby, Ron MacLean, Jonathan and Drew Scott, Arisa Cox, Andrew Phung and Priyanka. Actor Simu Liu also appeared in sketches with TallBoyz. The advance Canadian Screen Week presentations were hosted by Brandon Gonez, Sangita Patel, Jennifer Hedger, Supinder Wraich, Deepa Prashad, Mary Berg, Akiel Julien, Ennis Esmer and Laurence Leboeuf.

== Special awards ==
Recipients of the academy's special awards were announced on January 18.

- Board of Directors Tribute Award: Vince Commisso, John Galway
- Gordon Sinclair Award: Rassi Nashalik
- Radius Award: Maitreyi Ramakrishnan
- Changemaker Award: Kayla Grey, Kathleen Newman-Bremang, Amanda Parris
- Lifetime Achievement Award: Bob Cole

== Film ==
Best Motion Picture	Best Director
Scarborough — Shasha Nakhai; Drunken Birds (Les oiseaux ivres) — Luc Déry, Kim McCraw; Night of the Kings (La Nuit des rois) — Yanick Létourneau; Night Raiders — Tara Woodbury, Paul Barkin, Ainsley Gardiner, Georgina Conder, Danis Goulet; Wildhood — Gharrett Patrick Paon, Julie Baldassi, Bretten Hannam	Shasha Nakhai and Rich Williamson, Scarborough; Anthony Scott Burns, Come True; Danis Goulet, Night Raiders; Philippe Grégoire, The Noise of Engines (Le Bruit des moteurs); Bretten Hannam, Wildhood
Best Actor	Best Actress
Liam Diaz, Scarborough; Rogelio Balagtas, Islands; Pavle Čemerikić, The White Fortress (Tabija); Phillip Lewitski, Wildhood; Thomas Antony Olajide, Learn to Swim	Elle-Máijá Tailfeathers, Night Raiders; Aviva Armour-Ostroff, Lune; Alana Hawley Purvis, Range Roads; Aliya Kanani, Scarborough; Julia Sarah Stone, Come True
Best Supporting Actor	Best Supporting Actress
Joshua Odjick, Wildhood; Esteban Comilang, Islands; David La Haye, Confessions of a Hitman (Confessions); Claude Legault, Drunken Birds (Les Oiseaux ivres); Mark O'Brien, The Righteous	Cherish Violet Blood, Scarborough; Tanja Björk, The Noise of Engines (Le Bruit des moteurs); Kate Corbett, The Righteous; Marine Johnson, Drunken Birds (Les Oiseaux ivres); Gail Maurice, Night Raiders
Best Original Screenplay	Best Adapted Screenplay
Danis Goulet, Night Raiders; Igor Drljaca, The White Fortress (Tabija); Bretten Hannam, Wildhood; Kaveh Nabatian, Without Havana (Sin la Habana); Mark O'Brien, The Righteous	Catherine Hernandez, Scarborough; Erik Rutherford and David Bezmozgis, Charlotte; Sylvain Guy, Confessions of a Hitman (Confessions); Fred Pellerin, The Time Thief (L'Arracheuse de temps); Éric Tessier, You Will Remember Me (Tu te souviendras de moi)
Best Feature Length Documentary	Best Short Documentary
Kímmapiiyipitssini: The Meaning of Empathy — Elle-Máijá Tailfeathers, David Christensen, Lori Lozinski; Captive — Mellissa Fung, Stuart Coxe; My Tree — Jason Sherman, Sonya Di Rienzo, Aeschylus Poulos, Matt Code; One of Ours — Yasmine Mathurin, Laura Perlmutter, Jennifer Kawaja, Andrew Nicholas McCann Smith; Prayer for a Lost Mitten (Prière pour une mitaine perdue) — Jean-François Lesage	Nalujuk Night — Jennie Williams, Latonia Hartery, Kat Baulu, Rohan Fernando, Annette Clarke; Babushka — Kristina Wagenbauer; The Brother (Le Frère) — Jérémie Battaglia; Nuisance Bear — Jack Weisman, Gabriela Osio Vanden; Still Processing — Sophy Romvari
Best Live Action Short Drama	Best Animated Short
Girls Shouldn't Walk Alone at Night (Les filles ne marchent pas seules la nuit) — Katerine Martineau, Guillaume Collin; Fanmi — Sandrine Brodeur-Desrosiers, François Bonneau, Carmine Pierre-Dufour; In the Jam Jar — Étienne Hansez, Colin Nixon; Like the Ones I Used to Know (Les Grandes claques) — Annie St-Pierre, Sarah Mannering, Fanny Drew; Ousmane — Jorge Camarotti	Angakusajaujuq: The Shaman's Apprentice — Zacharias Kunuk, Neil Christopher, Nadia Mike, Jonathan Frantz; Boobs (Lolos) — Marie Valade; Flowing Home (Như một dòng sông) — Sandra Desmazières, Dora Benousilio, Julie Roy; The Hangman at Home — Michelle Kranot, Uri Kranot, Lana Tankosa Nikolic, Avi Amar, Katayoun Dibamehr, Emmanuel-Alain Raynal, Pierre Baussaron, Marc Bertrand, Julie Roy; Meneath: The Hidden Island of Ethics — Terril Calder, Jelena Popović
Best Art Direction/Production Design	Best Casting
Arnaud Brisebois, Jean Babin and Ève Turcotte, The Time Thief (L'arracheuse de temps); Jean Babin, Maria Chapdelaine; André-Line Beauparlant, Drunken Birds (Les oiseaux ivres); Nigel Churcher, The Exchange; Danny Haeberlin, All My Puny Sorrows	Shasha Nakhai and Rich Williamson, Scarborough; Stephanie Gorin, Wildhood; Rene Haynes, Night Raiders; Heidi Levitt, All My Puny Sorrows; Jenny Lewis and Sara Kay, The Retreat
Best Cinematography	Best Costume Design
Sara Mishara, Drunken Birds (Les Oiseaux ivres); Pierre Gill, You Will Remember Me (Tu te souviendras de moi); Tess Girard, Drifting Snow; Daniel Grant, All My Puny Sorrows; Rich Williamson, Scarborough	Kendra Terpenning, Night Raiders; Lea Carlson, The Exchange; Josée Castonguay, The Time Thief (L'Arracheuse de temps); Francesca Chamberland, Maria Chapdelaine; Francesca Chamberland, The Vinland Club (Le Club Vinland)
Best Editing	Best Hair
Michelle Szemberg and Orlee Buium, All My Puny Sorrows; Aube Foglia, Night of the Kings (La nuit des rois); Dev Singh, Cinema of Sleep; Arthur Tarnowski, Drunken Birds (Les Oiseaux ivres); Yvann Thibaudeau, Goodbye Happiness (Au revoir le bonheur)	Martin Lapointe, Maria Chapdelaine; André Duval, The Vinland Club (Le Club Vinland); Debra Johnson, The Exchange; Janie Otis, The Time Thief (L'Arracheuse de temps); Denis Parent and Jean-Luc Lapierre, Confessions of a Hitman (Confessions)
Best Original Score	Best Original Song
Jonathan Goldsmith, All My Puny Sorrows; Suad Bushnaq, Jasmine Road; Spencer Creaghan, Motherly; Darren Fung, Cinema of Sleep; Stephen Krecklo, Between Waves	Tika Simone and Casey Manierka-Quaile, "And Then We Don't" — Learn to Swim; Erika Angell and Simon Angell, "Lovers Are Falling" — Woman in Car; David Braid, "Ring Them Fantasy" — Delia's Gone; Nicolas Errèra and Craig Walker, "Drop the Rock" — Goodbye Happiness (Au revoir le bonheur); Jean Martin and Tanya Tagaq, "Surface Nord" — Bootlegger
Best Sound Editing	Best Sound Mixing
Krystin Hunter, Paul Germann and Stefana Fratila, Scarborough; J. R. Fountain, Nelson Ferreira, Mark Dejczak, Robert Hegedus and Steve Hammond, PAW Patrol: The Movie; Martin Gwynn Jones, Brent Pickett, Jane Tattersall and Brennan Mercer, All My Puny Sorrows; Sean Karp, Blag Ahilov, Will Preventis, Noah Siegel, Jakob Thiesen and Igor Bezuglov, Dino Dana: The Movie; Daniel Pellerin, Jeremy Fong and Kristi McIntyre, Kicking Blood	Lou Solakofski, Graham Rogers, Stephen Marian, Alexis Feodoroff and Tim Chaproniere, Night Raiders; Joe Morrow, Lou Solakofski, Jonathan St. Clair and Thomas Dube, All My Puny Sorrows; Gavin Fernandes, Pierre Bertrand, Jocelyn Caron and Giuseppe Petrella, Brain Freeze; Bernard Gariépy Strobl, J. R. Fountain and Erik Culp, PAW Patrol: The Movie; Eric Taylor, Miles Roberts and Matt Chan, Scarborough
Best Makeup	Best Visual Effects
Traci Loader, Night Raiders; Djina Caron, Maria Chapdelaine; Erik Gosselin and Edwina Voda, Brain Freeze; Kristin Loeck and Calla-Syna Dreyer, Dangerous; Karlee Morse and Stephanie Pringle, The Retreat	Martin Tori, Darwin Go, John Mariella and Frank Rueter, Night Raiders; Alex Boothby, All My Puny Sorrows; Marc Côté, Michael Beaulac, Robert Rioux, Lisa Purisima, Maxime Lepage, Anouk Cazalis, Alex Harvey, Wesley Lemieux, Daniel Coupal and Randy Santandrea, Brain Freeze; Matthew J.R. Bishop, Ila Soleimani, Jeff Robinson, Aravindan Rajasingham, Gustavo Fernandes, Belma Abdicevic, Tom Perry, Steve Lowry and Tarl Lambert, Dino Dana: The Movie; Alain Lachance, Loïc Laurelut, Eric Clément and Marie-Claude Lafontaine, The Time Thief (L'arracheuse de temps)
Best Cinematography in a Documentary	Best Editing in a Documentary
Marianne Ploska, Prayer for a Lost Mitten (Prière pour une mitaine perdue); Vince Arvidson, The Magnitude of All Things; Nicholas Castel, Gabriel Swift, Bronson Whytcross and John Fulton, Coextinction; Rita Leistner, Forest for the Trees; Patrick McLaughlin, Kímmapiiyipitssini: The Meaning of Empathy	Ben Lawrence, My Tree; Jennifer Abbott, The Magnitude of All Things; Sophie Farkas Bolla, The Gig Is Up; Natalie Lamoureux, I Might Be Dead by Tomorrow (Tant que j'ai du respir dans le corps); Hans Olson, Kímmapiiyipitssini: The Meaning of Empathy
John Dunning Best First Feature	Golden Screen Award
Shasha Nakhai and Rich Williamson, Scarborough; Martin Edralin, Islands; Danis Goulet, Night Raiders; Philippe Grégoire, The Noise of Engines (Le Bruit des moteurs); Kaveh Nabatian, Without Havana (Sin la Habana)	PAW Patrol: The Movie

== Television ==
=== Programs ===
Drama series	Comedy series
Transplant; Coroner; Moonshine; The North Water; Vikings	Sort Of; Jann; Kim's Convenience; Letterkenny; Strays
Animated program or series	Documentary program
Corner Gas Animated; Daniel Tiger's Neighbourhood; Go, Dog. Go!; The Snoopy Show; Wild Kratts: Cats and Dogs	Catching a Serial Killer: Bruce McArthur; Being Black in Halifax; Dead Man's Switch: A Crypto Mystery; The Face of Anonymous; Fresh Water
Children's or youth fiction	Children's or youth non-fiction
The Hardy Boys; Endlings; Lockdown; Odd Squad Mobile Unit	All-Round Champion; Gabby's Farm; How Do You Feel?; My Home, My Life
Television Movie	History Documentary Program or Series
I Was Lorena Bobbitt; The Christmas Setup; The Color of Love; Faith Heist; Midnight at the Magnolia	How to Start a Revolution; British Columbia: An Untold History; History Erased; Meet and Eat at Lee's Garden; Searching for Secrets
Biography or Arts Documentary Program or Series	Lifestyle Program or Series
Oscar Peterson: Black + White; Exhibitionists; Terry Fox: The Power of One; This Is Pop; Writing the Land	Mary Makes It Easy; Island of Bryan; Motel Makeover; Property Brothers: Forever Home; Scott's Vacation House Rules
Pre-School Program or Series	Reality/Competition Program or Series
PAW Patrol; Dino Ranch; Happy House of Frightenstein; Miss Persona; Pikwik Pack	Canada's Drag Race; Big Brother Canada; Blown Away; Fire Masters; Top Chef Canada
Science or Nature Documentary Program or Series (Rob Stewart Award)	Social/Political Documentary Program (Donald Brittain Award)
Borealis; The Nature of Things: "Inside the Great Vaccine Race"; The Nature of Things: "Kids vs. Screens"; The Nature of Things: "Kingdom of the Polar Bears"; The Nature of Things: "The Last Walrus"	Ghosts of Afghanistan; Big News; Dispatches from a Field Hospital; No Responders Left Behind; We Know the Truth: Stories to Inspire Reconciliation
Factual Program or Series	Sketch Comedy Series
Employable Me; For Heaven's Sake; Highway Thru Hell; Search and Rescue: North Shore; Yukon Harvest	TallBoyz; Humour Resources; Roast Battle Canada; This Hour Has 22 Minutes
Variety or entertainment special	Talk program or series
Canada's Drag Race Anniversary Extravaganza; The 2021 Governor General’s Performing Arts Awards; etalk: A Day To Listen, Learn and Remember; Indspire Awards 2021; New Year’s Eve	Artists & Icons: Indigenous Entertainers in Canada; The Marilyn Denis Show; Power Play; Rosemary Barton Live; The Social
Live entertainment special
Juno Awards of 2021; 2020 Scotiabank Giller Prize; etalk Live at the Oscars; 2021 TIFF Tribute Awards

=== Actors ===
Lead actor, drama	Lead actress, drama
Hamza Haq, Transplant; Yannick Bisson, Murdoch Mysteries; Roger Cross, Coroner; Victor Garber, Family Law; Peter Mooney, Burden of Truth	Laurence Leboeuf, Transplant; Vinessa Antoine, Diggstown; Kristin Kreuk, Burden of Truth; Melanie Scrofano, Wynonna Earp; Serinda Swan, Coroner
Lead actor, comedy	Lead actress, comedy
Paul Sun-Hyung Lee, Kim's Convenience; Darryl Hinds, Overlord and the Underwoods; Jared Keeso, Letterkenny; Simu Liu, Kim's Convenience; Jason Priestley, Private Eyes	Jean Yoon, Kim's Convenience; Jann Arden, Jann; Andrea Bang, Kim's Convenience; Dani Kind, Workin' Moms; Meredith MacNeill, Pretty Hard Cases
Lead actor, television film or miniseries	Lead actress, television film or miniseries
Luke Humphrey, I Was Lorena Bobbitt; Emmanuel Kabongo, Death She Wrote; Ben Lewis, The Christmas Setup; Niall Matter, Aurora Teagarden Mysteries: Til Death Do Us Part; Corey Sevier, Love in Translation	Samora Smallwood, Death She Wrote; Paula Brancati, Death She Wrote; Candace Cameron Bure, Aurora Teagarden Mysteries: Til Death Do Us Part; Jennie Garth, Left for Dead: The Ashley Reeves Story; Dani Montalvo, I Was Lorena Bobbitt
Supporting actor, drama	Supporting actress, drama
Tim Rozon, Wynonna Earp; Meegwun Fairbrother, Burden of Truth; Kevin Hanchard, Hudson & Rex; Mpho Koaho, Diggstown; Peter MacNeill, Moonshine	Ayisha Issa, Transplant; Natasha Henstridge, Diggstown; Emma Hunter, Moonshine; Rebecca Liddiard, Frankie Drake Mysteries; Tamara Podemski, Unsettled
Supporting actor, comedy	Supporting actress, comedy
Andrew Phung, Kim's Convenience; Ryan Belleville, Workin' Moms; Peter Keleghan, Workin' Moms; Al Mukadam, Pretty Hard Cases; Jonathan Torrens, Vollies	Kaniehtiio Horn, Letterkenny; Lisa Codrington, Letterkenny; Jayne Eastwood, Overlord and the Underwoods; Enuka Okuma, Workin' Moms; Karen Robinson, Pretty Hard Cases
Performance in a guest role, comedy series	Performance in a guest role, drama series
Michael Bublé, Jann: "No Drama"; Ben Beauchemin, Kim's Convenience: "Appa & Linus"; Amanda Brugel, Pretty Hard Cases: "Gliders"; Tricia Black, Pretty Hard Cases: "Dealz"/"Jellybeans"; Kim Coates, Pretty Hard Cases: "Gliders"/"Jellybeans"	Tamara Podemski, Coroner: "Spirits"; Jann Arden, Wynonna Earp: "Love's All Over"; Jully Black, Diggstown: "Nina Francis"; Wendy Crewson, Frankie Drake Mysteries: "Ghost in the Machine"; Peter Keleghan, Murdoch Mysteries: "Code M for Murdoch"
Performance in an animated program or series	Performance in a children's or youth program or series
RuPaul, The Bravest Knight; Lorne Cardinal, Corner Gas Animated; Corrine Koslo, Corner Gas Animated; Eric Peterson, Corner Gas Animated; Tara Spencer-Nairn, Corner Gas Animated	Saara Chaudry, Lockdown; Kamaia Fairburn, Endlings; Valentina Herrera, Odd Squad Mobile Unit; Alyssa Hidalgo, Odd Squad Mobile Unit; Michela Luci, Endlings
Performance in a variety or sketch comedy program or series
Guled Abdi, Vance Banzo, Tim Blair and Franco Nguyen, TallBoyz; Mark Critch, Cathy Jones and Trent McClellan, This Hour Has 22 Minutes; Jon Dore, Humour Resources; Russell Peters, Sabrina Jalees, K. Trevor Wilson, Ennis Esmer, Keith Pedro, Daniel Woodrow, Mike Rita and Brittany Lyseng, Roast Battle Canada

=== News and information ===
National newscast	Local newscast
CBC News: The National; APTN National News; CTV National News; Global National	CTV News Toronto at 6; CBC Winnipeg News at 6; CityNews at 6; CTV News Vancouver at 6
News anchor, national	News anchor, local
Lisa LaFlamme, CTV National News; Adrienne Arsenault, Andrew Chang and Ian Hanomansing, CBC News: The National; Dawna Friesen, Global National	Anita Bathe, CBC Vancouver News at 6; Dwight Drummond, CBC Toronto News at 6; Michelle Dubé and Nathan Downer, CTV News Toronto; Tom Murphy and Amy Smith, CBC Nova Scotia News
National reporter	Local reporter
Tina House, APTN National News; Ellen Mauro, CBC News: The National; Omar Sachedina, CTV National News; Mercedes Stephenson, Global National	Belle Puri, CBC Vancouver News at 6; Bonnie Allen, CBC News Saskatchewan; Mike Crawley, CBC Toronto News at 6; Shauna Hunt, CityNews at 6
News or information series	News or information program
APTN Investigates; The Fifth Estate; Marketplace	The Fifth Estate: "13 Deadly Hours"; CTV National News: "2020 Year in Review"; Marketplace: "The Truth About Your Lifesaving PPE"; W5: "COVID: Year 2"
News or information segment	News special
APTN Investigates: "The Death Report"; CBC News: The National: "The Lost Children of Kamloops"; The New Reality: "Betty’s Story"; W5: "Flight 752"	CBC News: "Installation of the 30th Governor General Mary Simon"; Breakfast Television: "The Truth About Reconciliation"; CTV News: "HRH Prince Philip 1921-2021"
Morning show	Entertainment news
Breakfast Television; CBC Morning Live; CTV Morning Live; Your Morning	Entertainment Tonight Canada; eTalk; eTalk Presents: Simu Liu, Hometown Hero
Host or interviewer, news or information program or series	Host, lifestyle program
Avery Haines, W5: "A Town Divided"; Adrienne Arsenault, CBC News: The National; Ian Hanomansing, CBC News: The National; Sandie Rinaldo, W5: "Stacked Odds"	Mary Berg, Mary Makes It Easy; Bryan Baeumler and Sarah Baeumler, Island of Bryan; John Catucci, Big Food Bucket List; Sebastian Clovis and Samantha Pynn, Save My Reno; Drew Scott and Jonathan Silver Scott, Property Brothers: Forever Home
Host, talk show or entertainment news	Host or presenter, factual or reality/competition
Amanda Parris, Exhibitionists; Rosemary Barton, Rosemary Barton Live; Cheryl Hickey, Sangita Patel and Carlos Bustamante, Entertainment Tonight Canada: "Favourite Canadian Countdown"; Daryn Jones and Deepa Prashad, The Bachelor After Show: After Paradise Canada; Dina Pugliese and Sid Seixeiro, Breakfast Television	Brooke Lynn Hytes, Traci Melchor, Amanda Brugel and Brad Goreski, Canada's Drag Race; Arisa Cox, Big Brother Canada; Gerry Dee, Family Feud Canada; Alan Shane Lewis and Ann Pornel, The Great Canadian Baking Show; Ron MacLean, Battle of the Blades
Best host, live entertainment special
Arisa Cox and Andrew Phung, From Ontario with Love; Eric McCormack, 2020 Scotiabank Giller Prize; Isabelle Racicot, The 2021 Governor General’s Performing Arts Awards; Angeline Tetteh-Wayoe, Juno Awards of 2021

=== Sports ===
Live sporting event coverage	Sports analysis or commentary
2021 Stanley Cup Finals Game 4 – Ed Hall, Sherali Najak, Brian Spear; 2021 CFL Season Opener – Paul Graham, Jon Hynes; 2021 IIHF Women's World Championship Gold Medal Game – Paul Graham, Sam Cicirello; Toronto Raptors vs Denver Nuggets – Rebecca Ross, Paul Graham, Michael Gelfand, David Leiter, Chris Phillips	Joe Siddall, Blue Jays Central; Kevin Bieksa, Hockey Night in Canada; Meghan McPeak, Tokyo 2020 Olympic Games on CBC; Craig Simpson, NHL on Sportsnet; Michael Smith, Tokyo 2020 Olympic Games on CBC
Sports host	Sports play-by-play
Andi Petrillo, Tokyo 2020 Olympic Games on CBC; James Duthie, Free Agent Frenzy; Evanka Osmak, Sportsnet Central; Scott Russell, Tokyo 2020 Olympic Games on CBC	Dan Shulman, Blue Jays on Sportsnet; Rod Black, 2021 CFL Season Opener; Chris Cuthbert, NHL on Sportsnet; Mark Lee, Tokyo 2020 Olympic Games on CBC; Rob Snoek, Tokyo 2020 Olympic Games on CBC
Sports feature segment	Sports opening
"Ahmed & Muhammed" (TSN) – Matt Dunn, Sara Orlesky, Kevin Fallis, Sara Bonetta, Stephan Recksiedler; "Alex" (TSN) – Matt Dorman, Darren Oliver, Kevin Fallis, Curry Leamen, Scott Taylor; "Training for Olympic Heat" (CBC News: The National) – Adrienne Arsenault, Sarah Bridge, Brenda Witmer; "Zac Bell: The Hockey Jedi" (Sportsnet) – Mark Wade, Jeremy McElhanney, Scott Taylor	UEFA Euro 2020 – Simon Garan, Devon Burns, Jacob Frenkel, Kevin Fallis, Adam Fair; Nike's Big Bet – AJ Leitch; Tokyo 2020 Olympic Games on CBC: "The Marathon" – Chris Irwin, Tim Thompson
Sports program or series
Nike's Big Bet – Paul Kemp, Corey Russell; Anyone's Game – Kyle McCutcheon, Jack Sussman, Chris Koras, Terence Richards, Michael Hamilton, Vince Buda; Tim & Friends – Jon Coleman, Paul Bromby, Jason Sands, Thomas Dobby, Tim Micallef, Jesse Rubinoff; Tokyo 2020 Olympic Games on CBC – Chris Irwin, Paul McDougall, Karen Sebesta, Mike Dodson, Glen MacDonald, Joel Darling, Judy Dine, Milan Maglov, Sunil Thakolkaren

=== Craft awards ===
Casting, Fiction	Casting, Non-Fiction
Andrea Kenyon, Randi Wells, Jason Knight and John Buchan, Transplant; Jon Comerford, Sort Of; Sharon Forrest and Susan Forrest, Pretty Hard Cases; Frank Moiselle, Nuala Moiselle and Deirdre Bowen, Vikings; Lisa Parasyn and Rhonda Fisekci, Jann	Heather Muir, Canada's Drag Race; Meredith Veats, The Great Canadian Baking Show; Meredith Veats, Junior Chef Showdown
Editorial research	Visual research
Stephen Bandera and Shelley Ayres, W5: "Flight 752"; Leena Minifie and Jennifer Chiu, British Columbia: An Untold History: "Change + Resistance"; Aidan Denison, James Broadley and Chorong Kim, History Erased: "Bees, Bugs & Spiders"; Lola Waheed, Ruth Feldstein, Yoruba Richen, Arden Wray and Elizabeth Trojian, How It Feels to Be Free; Denise Kimmel, Chad Derrick and Daniele Hamamdjian, W5: "Consumed by Conspiracy"	Mark Selby, Oscar Peterson: Black + White; Lanna Lucas, Casey Lees, Ben Mussett, Leah Siegel, Don Bourdon and Emma Metcalfe Hurst, British Columbia: An Untold History; Erin Chisholm, How It Feels to Be Free; Gina Cali, The Nature of Things: "Kingdom of the Polar Bears"; Stephen Bandera, W5: "Flight 752"
Make-Up	Costume Design
Jessica Carter and Steve Newburn, Sort Of: "Sort of Back Again"; Catherine Davies, Frankie Drake Mysteries: "Life is a Cabaret"; Debi Drennan, Murdoch Mysteries: "Code M for Murdoch"; Bruno Gatien and Julie Brisebois, Transplant: "Guardrail"; Joanne Jacobsen and Gunther Schetterer, Wynonna Earp: "Better Dig Two"	Jennifer Haffenden, Wynonna Earp: "Hell Raisin’ Good Time"; Jenifur Jarvis, Frankie Drake Mysteries: "Sweet Justice"; Joanna Syrokomla, Murdoch Mysteries: "Murder Checks In"; Nicole Manek, Pretty Hard Cases: "Flowers"; Shelley Mansell, Sort Of: "Sort Of Back Again"
Hair	Photography in a comedy program or series
Jo-Dee Thomson, Wynonna Earp: "Hell Raisin’ Good Time"; Cindy Lou Tache, Frankie Drake Mysteries: "Life is a Cabaret"; Alex Rotundo, Miss Persona: "I Wanna Wear / Shake Your Pants"; Shirley Bond, Murdoch Mysteries: "Murder Checks In"; Leanne Morrison, Private Eyes: "Queen’s Gambit"	Jim Westenbrink, Letterkenny: "Sleepover"; Vinit Borrison, Faith Heist; James Klopko, Kim's Convenience: "Cookie Monster"; Stephe Reizes, Sort Of: "Sort Of Stable"; Ben Lichty, Workin' Moms: "Punch Dad"
Photography in a documentary program or factual series	Photography in a drama program or series
John Minh Tran, Borealis; Alfonso Chin and Michael Bourquin, British Columbia: An Untold History: "Change + Resistance"; Simon Schneider and Monica Guddat, Dead Man's Switch: A Crypto Mystery; Michael Grippo, The Nature of Things: "Kids vs. Screens"; Christian Bielz, The Nature of Things: "The Last Walrus"	Pierre Gill, Transplant: "Guardrail"; Samy Inayeh, Coroner: "Christmas Eve"; Fraser Brown, The Hardy Boys: "While the Clock Ticked"; Maya Bankovic, I Was Lorena Bobbitt; Nick Haight, Moonshine: "Escape Goat"
Photography in a lifestyle or reality program or series	Photography in a news or information program, series or segment
Alex Nadon, Big Brother Canada: "Premier"; Daniel MacAskill, Big Food Bucket List: "Taco Walk on the Wild Side"; Shane Geddes, Blown Away: "Runway Walk"; Matthew Braun, Carnival Eats: "The Postman Always Brings Rice"; Charles P. Martel, Chuck and the First Peoples Kitchen: "Iqaluit – Ptarmigan"; Ryan Shaw, Fire Masters: "A Fiery-Tale Ending"; John Queenan, Island of Bryan: "Shake It Up"	Jean-François Bisson, CBC News: The National: "Uganda’s Gorillas & The COVID Threat"; Andy Hincenburgs, The Fifth Estate: "Bitter Harvest"; Jerry Vienneau, W5: "The Covid Legacy"
Editing in a comedy program or series	Editing in a dramatic program or series
Kyle Martin, Letterkenny: "Sleepover"; Aren Hansen, Kim's Convenience: "Appa & Linus"; Lisa Grootenboer, Pretty Hard Cases: "Jellybeans"; Sam Thomson and Craig Webster, Sort Of: "Sort Of Back Again"; Marianna Khoury, Workin' Moms: "FACK"	Annie Ilkow, Transplant: "Contact"; Teresa de Luca, Coroner: "Christmas Day"; Kimberlee McTaggart, Moonshine: "So Long, Farewell, You’re Staying"; Kathy Weinkauf, Murdoch Mysteries: "Murdoch Escape Room"; Simone Smith, SurrealEstate: "For Sale by Owner"; Michael Doherty, Wynonna Earp: "Old Souls"
Editing in a documentary program or series	Editing in a factual program or series
Susan Shanks, Ghosts of Afghanistan; Ness Van Hassel, Dead Man's Switch: A Crypto Mystery; Steve Weslak, Gangster's Gold; Cathy Gulkin, The Nature of Things: "Inside the Great Vaccine Race"; Nicolas Kleiman, Oscar Peterson: Black + White	Anna Bigos, Arctic Vets: "Polar Bear Heli-Rescue"; Aileen McBride, The Fifth Estate: "Bitter Harvest"; Samantha Shields, Motel Makeover: "Opening Weekend"; Otto Chung, Project Bakeover: "Homemade to Home Run"; Natalie Glubb, Yukon Harvest: "Spiritual Place, Part 1"
Editing in a reality or competition program or series	Production design/art direction in a fiction program or series
Baun Mah, Canada's Drag Race: "The Snatch Game"; Jeff Perry, Wes Paster, Jonathan Dowler, Antonio Burgio, Lizzie Elliott, Ben O’Neil, Curtis Rogers, Megan Day, Michael Emberley, Keith Ross, Jon Wong, Jessica Graore, Jory Tuff, Jon White, Al Manson, Andrew Gurney and Ryan Monteith, Big Brother Canada: "Finale"; Lindsay Ragone, Canada's Drag Race: "Screech"; Peter Topalovic, Canada's Drag Race: "Under the Big Top"; Wesley Finucan, Fire Masters: "Nice to Meat You"	Trevor Smith and Amber Humphries, Wynonna Earp: "Hell Raisin' Good Time"; Bob Sher, Murdoch Mysteries: "Murdoch and the Tramp"; Emmanuel Fréchette, The North Water: "Behold the Man"; Chris Crane and Joël Guzman, Sort Of: "Sort Of A Party"; Grant Pearse and Tracey Loverock, Van Helsing: "Lumina Intunecata"
Production design/art direction in a non-fiction program or series	Sound in a fiction program or series
Tim Luke, Blown Away: "Mirror, Mirror"; Alex Nadon, Battle of the Blades: "Finale"; Peter Faragher, Kevin Halliday, Aaron Scholl and Andy Roskaft, Big Brother Canada: "Premiere"; Lyle Jobe, Eli Roth Presents: A Ghost Ruined My Life: "Portal to Hell"; Alex Nadon, Terry Fox: The Power of One	Jane Tattersall, Martin Lee, Ian Rankin, David McCallum, Claire Dobson, Dale Sheldrake, Steve Medeiros, Yuri Gorbachow, Sandra Fox, Kevin Schultz, Chelsea Body and Daniel Birch, Vikings: "The Last Act"; Janice Ierulli and Mark Shnuriwsky, Frankie Drake Mysteries: "Sweet Justice"; Jane Tattersall, Matthew Chan, Ian Rankin, Martin Gwynn Jones, Brennan Mercer, Goro Koyama and Pietro Amato, The North Water: "Homo Homini Lupus"; Daryl Purdy, Paul Germann, Martin Gwynn Jones, Graham Rogers, Kevin Schultz, Jenna Dalla Riva and Goro Koyama, Sort Of: "Sort Of Miracle"; Mike Markiw, Janice Ierulli, Matthew Hussey, Mark Shnuriwsky, Sid Lieberman, Mike Woroniuk and Paul Shubat, Wynonna Earp: "Better Dig Two"
Sound in a non-fiction program or series	Sound in a variety or animated program or series
Doug McClement, Richard Spence-Thomas, Teresa Morrow and Gary Vaughan, Oscar Peterson: Black + White; John Diemer, Rob Taylor, Phil Nagy, Eric Leigh, Dane Kelly and Sarah Labadie, Canada's Drag Race: "Under the Big Top"; Eric Apps, For Heaven's Sake: "The Disappearance"; Mark Vreeken, The 2021 JUNO Awards; Velcrow Ripper and Randy Kiss, The New Corporation: The Unfortunately Necessary Sequel	Richard Spence-Thomas, Timothy Muirhead, Mitch Connors, Luke Dante, Kyle Peters, Ryan Ongaro and Patton Rodrigue, PAW Patrol: "Moto Pups: Pups vs the Ruff-Ruff Pack"; Mike Mancuso, Joe Tetreau, Patrick Mallan, Ryan Eligh and Matt McKenzie, Let's Go Luna!: "Leo the Viking"; Brendan Quinn, Julian Rudd, Ryan Chalmers, Art Mullin, Scott McCrorie and Evan Turner, Mighty Express: "Big Bart's Wild Ride"; Mike Mancuso, Matt McKenzie, Sue Robertson, Joe Tetreau and Neil Parfitt, Ranger Rob: "Fossil Finders Keepers in Big Sky Park"; Todd Araki, Jason Fredrickson, Adam McGhie, Marcel Duperreault and Andrew Downton, The Snoopy Show: "Happiness Is a Dancing Dog"
Visual effects
Dominic Remane, Bill Halliday, Leann Harvey, Becca Donohoe, Thomas Morrison, Ovidiu Cinazan, Jim Maxwell, Kieran McKay, Warren Lawtey and Maria Gordon, Vikings: "The Signal"; Matthew J.R. Bishop, Terry Bradley, Jeff Robinson, James Wallace, Ila Soleimani, Belma Abdicevic, Tom Perry, Steve Lowry, Nial McFadden and Stephen Curran, Endlings: "One World One Family"; Lisa Sepp-Wilson, Justine Rosette Nelligan, Richard Bergeron, Michael Michaud, Shamiran Graungaard, Jeff Bruneel and Marie-Lou Gingras, The North Water: "The Devils of the Earth"; Brian Huynh, Sophia Jooyeon Lee, Steve Huynh, Justin Perreault, Russell Challenger, Michael Davison, Marlon Bondoc and Evan Churchill, Overlord and the Underwoods: "Game Over"

=== Directing ===
Animated program or series	Children's or youth
Stephen Evans, Corner Gas Animated: "Haunt for Dread October"; Charles E. Bastien, PAW Patrol: "Moto Pups: Pups vs the Ruff-Ruff Pack"; Todd Kauffman and Mark Thornton, Pikwik Pack: "Tibor’s Butterfly Buddy"; Martin Kratt, Wild Kratts: Cats and Dogs; Behzad Mansoori-Dara and Rob Boutilier, The Snoopy Show: "Good Luck, Chuck"	Melanie Orr, The Hardy Boys: "What Happened in Bridgeport"; J.J. Johnson and Stefan Scaini, Odd Squad Mobile Unit: "H2 Oh No/In Your Dreams"; Graeme Lynch, All-Round Champion: "Boxing"; Melanie Orr, Endlings: "One World One"; Nicole Stamp, Lockdown: "The Confession Family Channel"
Comedy	Documentary series
Aleysa Young, Workin' Moms: "FACK"; Siobhan Devine, Kim's Convenience: "Who’s Pranking Who?"; Fab Filippo, Sort Of: "Sort Of Mary Poppins"; Renuka Jeyapalan, Sort Of: "Sort Of A Party"; Winnifred Jong, Pretty Hard Cases: "Gliders"	Kardeisha Provo, Tyler Simmonds, Dena Williams and Lily Nottage, Being Black in Halifax; Kevin Eastwood, British Columbia: An Untold History: "Migration + Resilience"; Leora Eisen, The Nature of Things: "Kids vs. Screens"; Jared Raab, This Is Pop: "Auto-Tune"; Stephanie Weimar, Writing the Land: "Water"
Documentary program	Drama series
Barry Avrich, Oscar Peterson: Black + White; Joel Bakan and Jennifer Abbott, The New Corporation: The Unfortunately Necessary Sequel; Sheona McDonald, Dead Man's Switch: A Crypto Mystery; Yasmine Mathurin, One of Ours; Julian Sher, Ghosts of Afghanistan	Helen Shaver, Vikings: "All at Sea"; Tracey Deer, Hudson & Rex: "Blood on the Tracks"; Sharon Lewis, Murdoch Mysteries: "The .38 Murdoch Special"; Charles Officer, Coroner: "Eyes Up"; Warren P. Sonoda, Murdoch Mysteries: "Murdoch Escape Room"
Factual	Lifestyle or information
Stephanie Clattenburg, Spirit Talker: "Membertou First Nation, NS"; Robin Bicknell, Haunted Hospitals: "A Spiteful Spirit, and The Portal"; Cat Hostick, Eli Roth Presents: A Ghost Ruined My Life: "Portal to Hell"; Michelle Mama, Shine True: "Azul"; Jeff Thrasher, Arctic Vets: "Polar Bear Heli-Rescue"	Ryan Carter, Artists & Icons: Indigenous Entertainers in Canada; Naela Choudhary, Project Bakeover: "Homemade to Home Run"; Charles P. Martel, Chuck and the First Peoples Kitchen: "Iqaluit – Ptarmigan"; Jessica Nahmias, Motel Makeover: "Opening Weekend"; Cheryl Zalameda, Making it Home with Kortney and Kenny: "Grant & Miguel"
Live sporting event	Reality or competition program or series
John Szpala, 2021 Stanley Cup Finals Game 4; Dawn Landis, 2021 IIHF Women’s World Championship Gold Medal Game; Franklin Rubinstein, Queen’s Plate	Shelagh O'Brien, Canada's Drag Race: "Under the Big Top"; Mike Bickerton, Blown Away: "Centre of Attention"; Graeme Lynch, Race Against the Tide: "Things That Go Bump in the Night"; Sherali Najak, Battle of the Blades: "Finale"; Harbinder Singh, Family Feud Canada: "Dinsdale vs. Campbell"
TV movie	Variety or sketch comedy program or series
Danishka Esterhazy, I Was Lorena Bobbitt; Gail Harvey, Gone Mom: The Disappearance of Jennifer Dulos; Sharon Lewis, Death She Wrote; J.B. Sugar, Faith Heist; Gloria Ui Young Kim, Left for Dead: The Ashley Reeves Story	Bruce McCulloch, TallBoyz: "You’re the Dads Now!"; Dave Russell and Barry Avrich, 2020 Scotiabank Giller Prize; Barry Avrich, Harbinder Singh and Dave Russell, From Ontario With Love: A Celebration of Hope; Shelagh O'Brien, Roast Battle Canada: "Episode 1"; Jocelyn Corkum and Allison Johnston, This Hour Has 22 Minutes: "Focus, Canada"

=== Music ===
Original music, fiction	Original music, non-fiction
Robert Carli and Peter Chapman, Wynonna Earp: "Better Dig Two"; Robert Carli, Frankie Drake Mysteries: "Showstoppers"; Todor Kobakov, Iva Delic and Tika Cato, Faith Heist; Gary Koftinoff and Phil Bennett, Hudson & Rex: "Under Pressure"; Trevor Morris, Vikings: "The Last Act"; Tom Third, Coroner: "Spirits"	Erica Procunier, The Nature of Things: "The Covid Cruise"; Rose Bolton, CBC Docs POV: "Born Bad"; Rose Bolton, Coral Ghosts; Amanda Cawley, Ageless Gardens: "Sacred Spaces"; Michelle Osis, The Nature of Things: "Inside the Great Vaccine Race"
Original music, animation
Ari Posner, Amin Bhatia and Kris Kuzdak, Let's Go Luna! – "The Way of the Gaucho"; Peter Chapman, Happy House of Frightenstein: "Wolfie’s Lost Howl"; Asher Lenz and Stephen Skratt, Pikwik Pack: "Suki’s Hero"; Neil Parfitt, Ranger Rob: "Fossil Finders Keepers in Big Sky Park"; Meiro Stamm, Xavier Riddle and the Secret Museum: "I Am Ella Fitzgerald"

=== Writing ===
Animated program or series	Children's or youth
Ken Cuperus and Sandy Jobin-Bevans, Happy House of Frightenstein: "Hide and Go Eek"; Jennifer Siddle, Corner Gas Animated: "Law & Quarter"; Brent Butt and Kyah Green, Corner Gas Animated: "Plots and Plans"; Andy Guerdat and Steve Sullivan, Paw Patrol: "Moto Pups: Pups vs the Ruff-Ruff Pack"; Charles Johnston, Xavier Riddle and the Secret Museum: "I Am Temple Grandin"	Mark De Angelis and Eric Toth, Odd Squad Mobile Unit: "Mission O Possible / Nature of the Sandbeast"; John May and Suzanne Bolch, 16 Hudson: "Welcome "; Lisa Codrington, Lockdown: "The Confession"; Nicole Stamp, Lockdown: "Guilty Until Proven Innocent"; Rennata López, My Home, My Life: "Israel-My Hip Hoppin' Family"
Comedy	Documentary
Bilal Baig and Fab Filippo, Sort Of: "Sort Of Gone"; Jennica Harper and Leah Gauthier, Jann: "No Drama"; Jared Keeso and Mark Forward, Letterkenny: "Kids with Problems"; Jenn Engels, Sort Of: "Sort Of Back"; Ian Iqbal Rashid, Sort Of: "Sort Of Mary Poppins"	Julian Sher, Graeme Smith and Natalie Dubois, Ghosts of Afghanistan; Barry Avrich, Oscar Peterson: Black + White; Joel Bakan, The New Corporation: The Unfortunately Necessary Sequel; Yasmine Mathurin, One of Ours; Sheona McDonald, Dead Man's Switch: A Crypto Mystery
Drama series	Factual program or series
Joseph Kay, Transplant: "Free For What"; Morwyn Brebner, Coroner: "Bobby"; Wendy Motion Brathwaite, Coroner: "Eyes Up"; Floyd Kane, Diggstown: "Nina Francis"; Emily Andras, Wynonna Earp: "Old Souls"	Jeff Thrasher, Arctic Vets: "Arctic Goodbyes"; Connie Edwards, Pamela Tomlinson and Brian Chambers, By Hook or By Cook: "Liam"; Armen Kazazian, Eli Roth Presents: A Ghost Ruined My Life: "Portal To Hell"; Mike Mildon, Jackson Rowe and Jay Cheel, For Heaven's Sake: "The Disappearance"; Todd Forsbloom and Erik Virtanen, Yukon Harvest: "Spiritual Place, Part 1"
Lifestyle or reality/competition program or series	TV movie
Brandon Ash-Mohammed, Canada's Drag Race: "Screech"; Trevor Hammond, Nancy Yeboah and Michael Yerxa, Battle of the Blades: "Finale"; Angie Pepper O'Bomsawin, Chuck and the First Peoples Kitchen: "Iqaluit - Ptarmigan"; Amy Segal, The Great Canadian Baking Show: "Bread Week"; Elvira Kurt, Junior Chef Showdown: "Let's Get Saucy"	Barbara Nance, I Was Lorena Bobbitt; Robin E. Crozier, The Taste of Blood; Owen Maxwell and Jimmy Ruggiero, Faith Heist; Christina Welsh, Left for Dead: The Ashley Reeves Story
Variety or sketch comedy program or series
Guled Abdi, Vance Banzo, Tim Blair, Franco Nguyen, Adam Bovoletis and Luc Mandl, TallBoyz: "You're The Dads Now!"; Luciano Casimiri, Kristeen Von Hagen, Dalton Higgins and Lindsay Cox, The 2021 JUNO Awards; Heidi Brander, Adam Christie, Cathy Jones, Mark Critch, Trent McClellan, Jeremy Woodcock, Jordan Foisy, Aisha Brown, Nigel Grinstead, Aba Amuquandoh, Nadine Bhabha, Leonard Chan, Adele Dicks, Alexander Nunez, Gillian Bartolucci, Chris Wilson, Dean Jenkinson and Matt Wright, This Hour Has 22 Minutes: "Reframing and Reopening"; Andrew Steenberg and Joanna Adams, TIFF Tribute Awards

== All-platform awards ==
One major category is currently presented without regard to the distinction between film, television or web media content.

Stunt Coordination
- John Stead, Pretty Hard Cases: "Jellybeans"
- Bill Ferguson, Dangerous
- Angelica Lisk-Hann, The Retreat
- George Tchortov, See for Me

== Audience awards ==
Nominees for the fan-voted Audience Choice award were announced on February 1. Although normally individual actors or personalities are nominated in the category, in 2022 the academy chose to honour shows.

The audience choice award was actually won by a show that had not been officially listed as one of the ten nominees; the process for this category does permit "write-in" campaigns.

Audience Choice	Shaw Rocket Fund Kids' Choice
Wynonna Earp; Big Brother Canada; Canada's Drag Race; Hudson & Rex; Island of Bryan; Jann; Pretty Hard Cases; Querencia; Sort Of; TallBoyz; Transplant	Miss Persona; Alien TV; Anaana's Tent; The Bravest Knight; Daniel Tiger's Neighbourhood; Dino Ranch; Odd Squad Mobile Unit; The Parker Andersons/Amelia Parker; PAW Patrol; The Snoopy Show

== Digital media ==
Web Program or Series, Fiction	Web Program or Series, Nonfiction
21 Black Futures — Mumbi Tindyebwa Otu, Lucius Dechausay, Fatuma Adar, Michael Sinclair, Myekah Payne, Grazyna Krupa; The Communist's Daughter — Lauren Corber, Leah Cameron, Natalie Novak Remplakowski; For the Record — Julian De Zotti, Jonas Diamond, Lisa Baylin; Next Stop — Amar Wala, Jabbari Weekes, Tichaona Tapambwa, Phil Witmer; Querencia — Jessie Anthony, Mary Galloway	Farm Crime – Geoff Morrison, Christina Carvalho; ET Canada Pride – John Kampilis, Jodie Davis, Laura Carroll, Bob Pagrach, Stephen Krajinovic; Fatima in Kabul – Brishkay Ahmed; Royal Rewind – John Kampilis, Jodie Davis, Laura Carroll, Bob Pagrach, Alyssa Croezen, Nadine Parker, Jamie Samhan; Your Two Cents – Jonathan Torrens, Sylvia Beirnes
Lead Performance, Web Program or Series	Supporting Performance, Web Program or Series
Lovell Adams-Gray, 21 Black Futures; Lyriq Bent, For the Record; Lisa Berry, 21 Black Futures; Julian De Zotti, For the Record; Jessica Holmes, The Communist's Daughter; Anna Hopkins, For the Record; Colin Mochrie, Mass Hysterical: A Comedic Cantata; Mary Walsh, Broad Appeal: Living with E's	George Stroumboulopoulos, The Communist's Daughter; Nadine Bhabha, The Communist's Daughter; Zoe Cleland, The Communist's Daughter; Karen LeBlanc, For the Record; Chelsea Russell, 21 Black Futures; Theresa Tova, For the Record; Benjamin Charles Watson, I Am Syd Stone; Maurice Dean Wint, For the Record
Direction, Web Program or Series	Writing, Web Program or Series
Charles Officer, 21 Black Futures: "The Death News"; Leah Cameron, The Communist's Daughter: "This Means War"; Lucius Dechausay, 21 Black Futures: "40 Parsecs and Some Fuel"; Alicia K. Harris, Next Stop: "Aftermath"; Sudz Sutherland, For the Record: "Climax"	Amanda Parris, 21 Black Futures: "The Death News"; Carly Heffernan and Matthew Reid, Mass Hysterical: A Comedic Cantata; Lawrence Hill, 21 Black Futures: "Sensitivity"; Kathleen Jayme, Farm Crime: "Invasion of the Murder Hornets"; Jonathan Torrens, Your Two Cents: "Working from Home"
Host in a Web Program or Series	Live Production, Social Media
Cheryl Hickey, Roz Weston, Sangita Patel, Carlos Bustamante, Keshia Chanté and Morgan Hoffman, ET Canada Live; Amanda Brugel and Steven McCarthy, 2021 CAFTCAD Awards Show; Saara Chaudry, CBC Kids News COVID Explainer; Darrell Faria, 2021 Toronto Sketch Comedy Festival Best of the Fest Award Show; Elaine Lui and Kathleen Newman-Bremang, The 24th Annual Toronto Film Critics Association Awards	The 24th Annual Toronto Film Critics Association Awards – Ashleigh Rains, Bern Euler, R.T. Thorne; ET Canada Live – John Kampilis, Jodie Davis, Laura Carroll, Bob Pagrach, Katie Colley, Gavin Crisp, Alyssa Croezen, Sarah Curran, Mikael Melo, Kate Morawetz, Chandra Price, Jamie Samhan, Rachel West, Catherine Williams; The Extra Hour: Tokyo 2020 Olympic Games – Ryan Johnston, Sarah Jenkins; Green Party Leadership Digital Special – Vassy Kapelos, David Thurton, Éric Grenier, Tyler Buist, Heather Spiller, Natasha Ramnarine, Chris Carter
Immersive Experience, Fiction	Immersive Experience, Nonfiction
The Passengers — Ziad Touma; Blasters of the Universe: Infinity Forever — Secret Location; Paranormal Pest Patrol — Secret Location	Space Explorers: The ISS Experience – Felix Lajeunesse, Paul Raphael; Fossil Hunt – Blair Powers, J.J. Johnson, Ronald Ruslim, Gavin Friesen, Mark Cautillo, Jermaine Williams, Sarah Imrisek, Kevin Gan, Alex Bethke, Alex Gordon, Britney Coates, Jung Yoon, Andrew Ebert, Adriano Bertuzzo, Geordie Telfer
Interactive Production	Video Game Narrative
CBC Kids News Minecraft Back to School Special – Lisa Fender, Jamie McMahon, Philip Street, Nina Corfu, Sabrina Fabian, Kat Go, Angelica Cooper, Taylor Katzel, India McAlister, Mia Rodak, Marie McCann; Charity – Parastoo Anoushahpour, Faraz Anoushahpour, Ryan Ferko, Jeremy Mendes, Rob McLaughlin; Discriminator – Brett Gaylor; Far Away from Far Away – Michael Crummey, Bruce Alcock, Jeremy Mendes, Annette Clarke, Rob McLaughlin	The Vale: Shadow of the Crown – David Evans; Echo Generation – Martin Gauvreau, Vanessa Chia; Rainbow Billy: The Curse of the Leviathan – Christopher Chancey, Kim Berthiaume, Pascal Nataf; Wayfinder – Matt DesLauriers, Nicholas Klassen, Rob McLaughlin

== Reception ==
Reviewing the film nominations, Barry Hertz of The Globe and Mail characterized them as "the perfect slate", on the grounds that they had struck an excellent balance between the traditional tensions around whether an award nomination slate should celebrate films that are already relatively well-known or highlight underrated work that merits further attention.
