= Ghosts of Afghanistan =

2021 Canadian documentary film

- Directed by: Julian Sher
- Written by: Julian Sher; Graeme Smith; Natalie Dubois
- Produced by: Natalie Dubois; Arnie Gelbart
- Starring: Graeme Smith
- Cinematography: Iqbal Ahmad Sapand
- Edited by: Susan Shanks
- Music by: Eric LeMoyne
- Production company: Galafilm Productions
- Release date: September 8, 2021
- Running time: 89 minutes
- Country: Canada
- Language: English

Ghosts of Afghanistan is a Canadian documentary film, directed by Julian Sher and released in 2021. The film documents the return of Canadian journalist Graeme Smith to Afghanistan, several years after his stint covering the War in Afghanistan for The Globe and Mail, and his interviews with various people about the effects of the war on Afghan society.

The film premiered September 8, 2021 on TVOntario, although it also had selected film festival screenings including at the Human Rights Film Festival in Berlin.

== Awards ==
Award	Date of ceremony	Category	Recipient(s)	Result	Ref(s)
Canadian Screen Awards	2022	Donald Brittain Award	Arnie Gelbart, Julian Sher, Natalie Dubois	Won	
Canadian Screen Awards	2022	Best Writing in a Documentary Program	Julian Sher, Graeme Smith, Natalie Dubois	Won	
Canadian Screen Awards	2022	Best Editing in a Documentary Program or Series	Susan Shanks	Won	
Canadian Screen Awards	2022	Best Direction in a Documentary Program	Julian Sher	Nominated	
