= Next Stop =

Canadian comedy anthology web series

Next Stop is a Canadian comedy anthology web series created and directed by Jabbari Weekes, Tichaona Tapambwa, and Phil Witmer. It premiered on February 26, 2019 on a dedicated YouTube channel. The series is executive produced by Amar Wala, the founder of Scarborough Pictures, and is set in Toronto.

At the beginning of 2020, Scarborough Pictures optioned the series. In October 2020, the series was added to CBC Gem.

== Plot ==
Next Stop chronicles the lives of Black Torontonians struggling to stay afloat and sane in the sprawling city. The show charts a course through chaotic, surreal, and hilarious vignettes of Toronto "yutes" confronting the challenges of life in a competitive, expensive, and rapidly changing city.

== Development ==
According to the creators, Next Stop was created out of necessity. In a short period preceding its creation, the directors and some of the core cast were laid off. The team noticed that a lack of shows about black life in Toronto, and developed the idea of a show that navigated between the over earnestness of local dramas and the heightened nature of comedy sketches. Consequently, the question that would propel the birth of the series was, “What about the people in-between who can be silly and serious?”

The initial crew funded the first season using their savings and severance packages, according to co-creators Weekes and Tapambwa. Due to the steady popularity of the series, Scarborough Pictures picked up production rights. In October 2020, the series was picked up by CBC for their digital platform CBC Gem.

== Cast ==
- Jordan Hayles as Good Yute #1 (3 episodes)
- Vanessa Adams as Good Yute #2 (3 episodes)
- Mahlet Tilahun as Confused Yute (1 episode)
- Sharine Taylor as Narrator (1 episode)
- Denise Yohannes as Chibi Duppy (1 episode)

Some actors appear in multiple episodes as the protagonist, background characters, or new characters entirely. For example, Hayles and Adams portray the protagonists in one episode, but in another play the unrelated roles of Uber passengers who debate that episode's protagonist.

== Episodes ==
=== Series overview ===
| Season | Episodes | Originally Released |
|---|---|---|
| 1 | 4 | 2019–2020 |

=== Season 1 (2019–2020) ===
| No. | Title | Directed by | Written by |
|---|---|---|---|
| 1 | BEEF | Jabbari Weekes | Jabbari Weekes & Tichaona Tapambwa |
A tale of two good yutes from the diaspora engaged in a legendary bakkle over which ends has the superior Jamaican patty. Cast: Vanessa Adams & Jordan Hayles
| 2 | MOSQUITO | Tichaona Tapambwa | Tichaona Tapambwa |
On her way to buy churros, one yute describes her encounter with a "Mosquito" with a unique taste for white blood. Cast: Vanessa Adams
| 3 | DUPPY | Jabbari Weekes | Jabbari Weekes |
A Toronto fairytale about a jobless man at the mercy of LinkedIn and seasonal affective disorder when a mysterious spirit appears. Cast: Xander Hall, Denise Yohannes, Sharine Taylor
| 4 | POOL | Phil Witmer & Jabbari Weekes | Jabbari Weekes & Tichaona Tapambwa |
In a dutty and cramped car not worth naming, two friends and a stranger question whether you need to leave Toronto to be successful or not. Cast: Mahlet Tilahun, Vanessa Adams, and Jordan Hayles

== Reception ==
Next Stop has been received positively in the press. Radheyan Simonpillai, in NOW Magazine, called it "a promising new show." The Globe and Mail’s John Doyle wrote that it was "a small scale jewel of a series." Kathleen Newman-Bremang praised the series in Refinery 29, comparing it to Issa Rae’s The Misadventures of an Awkward Black Girl, saying "these 4-5 minute pops of joy are just the beginning" while calling Vanessa Adams a "standout" and "formidable Black talent."

The series received two Canadian Screen Award nominations for Best Fiction Web Program or Series and Best Direction in a Web Program or Series (Alicia K. Harris) at the 10th Canadian Screen Awards in 2022.
