= How to Start a Revolution (TV series) =

Canadian documentary television series

How to Start a Revolution is a Canadian documentary television series that premiered in 2021 on CBC Gem. A two-part series based on the 2020 podcast Recall: How to Start a Revolution, the series explores the history of the Front de libération du Québec in the 1960s.

It won the Canadian Screen Award for Best History Documentary Program or Series at the 10th Canadian Screen Awards in 2022.
