= Writing the Land =

Canadian documentary television series

Writing the Land is a Canadian documentary television series, which premiered in 2021 on CBC Television. Created by Primitive Entertainment and directed by Stephanie Weimar, the four-episode series profiles twelve Canadian writers and their relationship with the landscapes and communities that inspire and inform their writing.

The series received two Canadian Screen Award nominations at the 10th Canadian Screen Awards in 2022, for Best Biography or Arts Documentary Program or Series and Best Direction in a Documentary Series (Weimar).

== Episodes ==
No.	Title	Original release date
1	"Light"	October 17, 2021
Esi Edugyan, Joshua Whitehead, Uzma Jalaluddin.
2	"Rock"	October 17, 2021
Michael Winter, Edem Awumey, Ivan Coyote.
3	"Trees"	October 24, 2021
Madeleine Thien, Katherena Vermette, Catherine Leroux.
4	"Water"	October 24, 2021
Eden Robinson, Catherine Hernandez, Aviaq Johnston.
