= The Face of Anonymous =

Canadian documentary film

- Genre: Documentary
- Written by: Gary Lang
- Directed by: Gary Lang
- Music by: Ken Myhr
- Country of origin: Canada
- Original language: English

Production
- Producer: Ed Barreveld
- Cinematography: José Manuel Gálvez Araiza; Patrick McGowan
- Editor: Rob Ruzic
- Running time: 87 minutes
- Production company: Storyline Entertainment

Original release
- Network: Hot Docs
- Release: April 29, 2021
- Network: TVOntario; Knowledge Network
- Release: May 25, 2021

The Face of Anonymous is a Canadian documentary television film, directed by Gary Lang and released in 2021. The film is a portrait of Christopher "Commander X" Doyon, a senior figure in the computer hacktivist collective Anonymous who spent several years living on the streets of Toronto as a homeless person after fleeing the United States due to criminal prosecution.

The film premiered at the Hot Docs Canadian International Documentary Festival on April 29, 2021, in advance of its television broadcast on May 25 on TVOntario. A few weeks after the film's broadcast, Doyon was extradited from Mexico, where he was residing at the time, back to the United States to face prosecution.

The film was a Canadian Screen Award nominee for Best Documentary Program at the 10th Canadian Screen Awards in 2022.
