= Junior Chef Showdown =

Canadian reality television series

Junior Chef Showdown is a Canadian reality cooking competition television series, which premiered in 2020 on Food Network Canada. The series is a competition for emerging chefs between the ages of 9 and 13, judged by Jordan Andino, Anna Olson and Lynn Crawford.

The first season aired in 2020 and was won by Audrey MacKinnon of Brantford, Ontario, and the second season aired in 2021 and was won by Nazaree Arandjelovic of Toronto.

The series received two Canadian Screen Award nominations at the 10th Canadian Screen Awards in 2022, for Best Casting in a Non-Fiction Series (Meredith Veats) and Best Writing in a Lifestyle or Reality/Competition Program or Series (Elvira Kurt).

== Season 1 ==
=== Contestants ===
- Audrey C
- César Z
- Cristian W
- Élie D
- Katie L
- Katlin S
- Kinza V
- Imal J
- Matthew F
- Mia-Rose A
- Noah Y
- Nyasia G
- Patrick M
- Sophia K
- Luka M
