= Hannah Cheesman =

Canadian actress and filmmaker

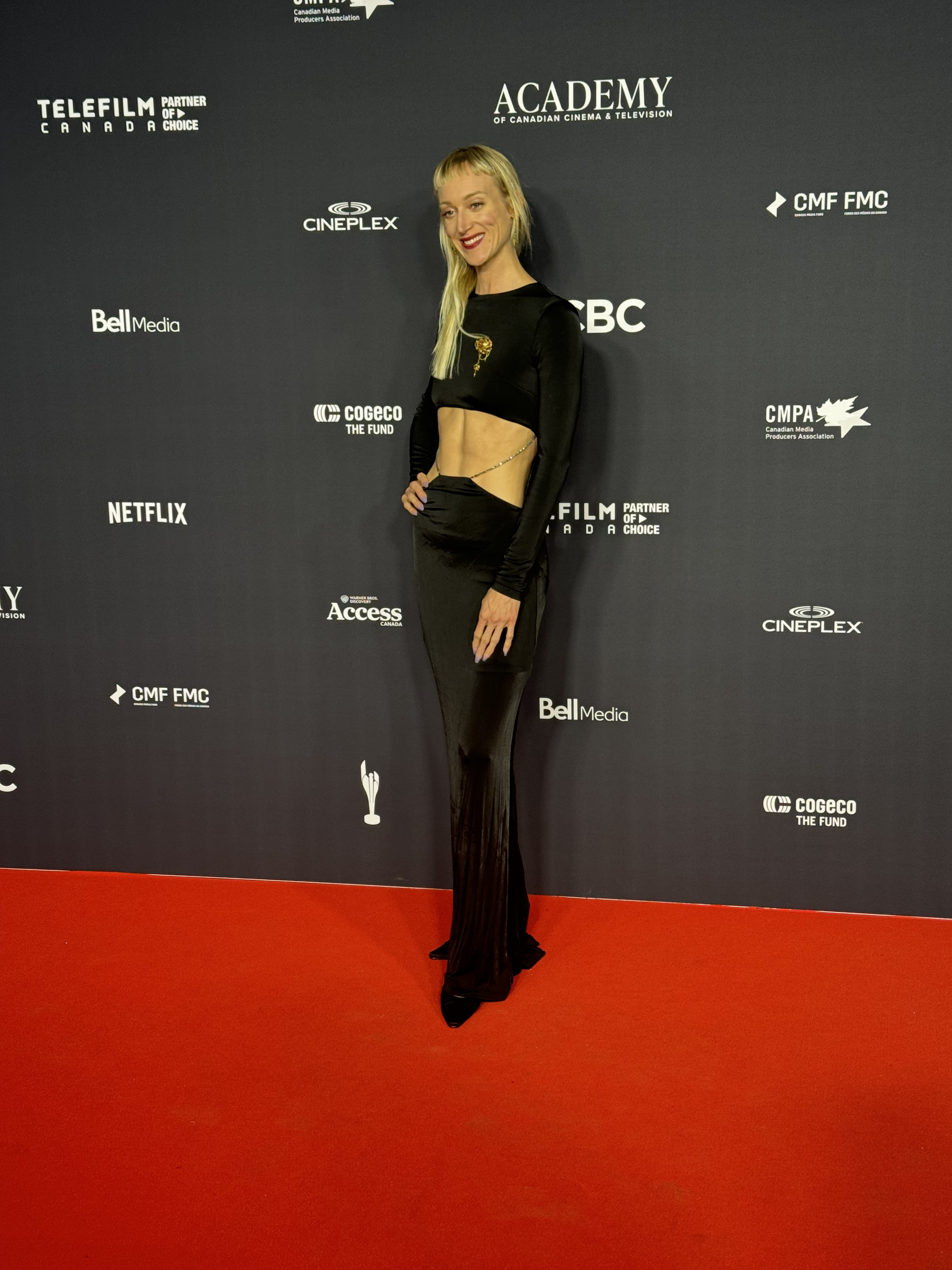
- Cheesman at the Canadian Screen Awards in 2024
- Occupations: Actress, filmmaker
- Years active: 2009–present
- Notable work: Whatever, Linda

Hannah Cheesman is a Canadian actress and filmmaker. As a performer, Cheesman is known for portraying Lieutenant Commander Airiam in the second season of the CBS television series Star Trek: Discovery. As a filmmaker, Cheesman has written and directed the short film Succor, starring Deragh Campbell and Michaela Kurimsky, which premiered at the 2020 Toronto International Film Festival. She won several accolades for her performance and work writing and producing the web series Whatever, Linda in 2014.

== Career ==
=== Early work ===
Cheesman began her career starring in several short and feature films, including Ingrid Veninger's low-budget independent film The Animal Project, which premiered at the 2013 Toronto International Film Festival.

=== Whatever, Linda ===
In 2014, Cheesman co-created, wrote, produced, and starred in the critically acclaimed web series Whatever, Linda. For her work on the series, she received several accolades, and was nominated for a Canadian Screen Award for Best Performance in a Program or Series Produced for Digital Media and for Best Original Program or Series produced for Digital Media.

Whatever, Linda has been in development with Bell Media and Orphan Black creator Graeme Manson for several years, with Cheesman slated to co-create, write, produce, and potentially star.

=== Short films and television work ===
In 2018, she wrote and directed the short film Emmy, which was selected to screen in the National Screen Institute's Online Short Film Festival. She has also worked in the writers rooms of Orphan Black and Workin' Moms.

In 2019, she starred as Lieutenant Commander Airiam in the second season of the CBS television series Star Trek: Discovery. The New York Times called her performance in the series "a real highlight". That year, she also guest-starred in an episode of the CBC series Schitt's Creek.

In 2024, she reprised the role of Airiam in a guest appearance in season 5 of Star Trek: Discovery.

== Filmography ==
=== Film ===
| Year | Title | Role | Notes |
|---|---|---|---|
| 2010 | Daylight Savings | Diana | Short film |
| 2013 | Mama | Beautiful Mama / Skinny Woman | |
| 2013 | The Animal Project | Alice | |
| 2015 | Boxing | Becca | Short film |
| 2015 | Star Princess | Operator | Short film |
| 2017 | The Definites | Anna | Also co-director, writer, producer |
| 2018 | Emmy | n/a | Short film; director, writer, producer |
| 2020 | Succor | n/a | Short film; director, writer, producer |
| 2021 | The Boathouse | | director |
| 2023 | Hey, Viktor! | Kate | |
| 2025 | Marriaginalia | | director |
| 2026 | I Come Home | Christine | |

=== Television ===
| Year | Title | Role | Notes |
|---|---|---|---|
| 2009 | Flashpoint | Uniformed Officer | "The Farm" |
| 2011 | Papillon | Eva | Main role (15 episodes) |
| 2011 | Mayday | Air Traffic Controller | "Cockpit Failure" |
| 2011 | Originals | Carina | Main role (7 episodes) |
| 2011 | Stay with Me | Crystal Meth | TV film |
| 2014 | Defiance | Lev | "Putting the Damage On", "Doll Parts", "I Almost Prayed" |
| 2014–2016 | Max & Shred | Kaylee Carpenter | Recurring role (21 episodes) |
| 2014 | Whatever, Linda | Linda Thoroughbred | Web series; also co-creator and writer |
| 2016 | L.M. Montgomery's Anne of Green Gables | Mrs. Carlyle | TV film |
| 2016 | Murdoch Mysteries | Mrs. Sachs | "From Buffalo with Love" |
| 2019–2020, 2024 | Star Trek: Discovery | Lieutenant Commander Airiam | Season 2: Recurring co-star (10 episodes); Season 3: Guest (2 episodes); Season 5: Guest (1 episode) |
| 2019 | Schitt's Creek | Tina Holdbridge | "A Whisper of Desire" |
| 2021 | The Hot Zone: Anthrax | Stephanie Dailey | "Noble Eagle" |
| 2025 | SurrealEstate | Madison/Death | "Death Does a Refi" |

=== Video games ===
| Year | Title | Role | Notes |
|---|---|---|---|
| 2010 | Shaun White Skateboarding | Lily | Voice |
