= Pick (film) =

2019 Canadian short film

- Film poster
- Directed by: Alicia K. Harris
- Written by: Alicia K. Harris
- Produced by: Alicia K. Harris; Venessa Harris; Rebeca Ortiz
- Starring: Hazel Downey; Deragh Campbell
- Cinematography: Ann Tipper
- Edited by: Kathryn Lyons
- Production company: Sugar Glass Films
- Release date: September 2019 (Urbanworld)
- Running time: 11 minutes
- Country: Canada
- Language: English

Pick is a 2019 Canadian short drama film, directed by Alicia K. Harris. The film stars Hazel Downey as Alliyah, a young Black Canadian girl struggling to cope with the social consequences of having chosen to go to school on class photo day wearing her natural Afro instead of straightening her hair.

The film was funded in part by a crowdfunding campaign on Kickstarter, and entered production in 2018. It premiered in September 2019 at the Urbanworld Film Festival.

The film won the Canadian Screen Award for Best Live Action Short Drama at the 8th Canadian Screen Awards in 2020.
