= Julian De Zotti =

Canadian actor, writer, director, producer

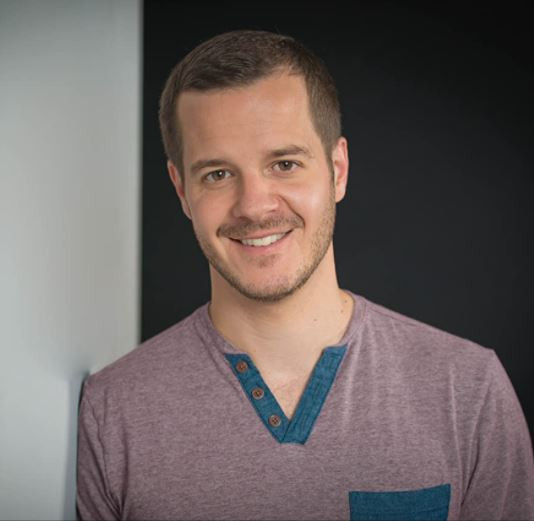
- Born: Mississauga, Canada
- Education: University of Toronto
- Occupations: Actor, writer, director, producer, web series creator
- Known for: Suits, Transplant, Business Ethics

Julian De Zotti is a Canadian actor, writer, director, producer, and web series creator. As an actor, he is known for recurring roles on Suits and Transplant, as well as a lead role in the feature film Business Ethics.

As a filmmaker, he is known for creating, writing and executive producing Whatever, Linda and Ming's Dynasty.

He is a graduate of the University College drama program (theatre performance) and the University of Toronto (political science).

== Career ==
De Zotti began his career writing and starring in several feature films, including New Year (2011), which premiered at the Montreal World Film Festival and sold to PeaceArch Entertainment.

In 2014, De Zotti co-created, wrote, produced, the critically acclaimed web series Whatever, Linda, for which he was nominated for a Canadian Screen Award for Best Original Program or Series produced for Digital Media.

Whatever, Linda is currently in development with Bell Media and Orphan Black creator Graeme Manson, with De Zotti slated to co-create, write, produce.

== Other work ==
De Zotti is also an active theatre creator and performer. He is a two-time Dora Mavor Moore Award-nominated actor for his part in the ensembles of Take Me Back To Jefferson (2015) and A Fool’s Life (2012).

In 2019, he co-created, wrote, showran, and guest-starred in Ming’s Dynasty for CBC Gem and Fuse TV in the US. He was nominated for Canadian Screen Awards for Best Supporting Performance in a Series produced for Digital Media and Best Original Program or Series produced for Digital Media.

He has also worked in the writers room of Snowpiercer for TNT/Netflix.

His series For the Record was released in 2020. De Zotti was a Canadian Screen Award nominee for Best Lead Performance in a Web Program or Series at the 10th Canadian Screen Awards in 2022.

He was an executive producer of Amanda Parris's 2022 web series Revenge of the Black Best Friend, in which he also had a supporting acting role.
