= Toronto Sketch Comedy Festival =

Annual comedy festival

The Toronto Sketch Comedy Festival, also known as the TOSketchfest, is an annual comedy festival in Toronto, Ontario, Canada, devoted to sketch comedy. Held over 12 days in March, the festival presents performances by both established and emerging sketch comedy troupes from Canada and the United States.

Among the most notable performers have been The Kids in the Hall, who reunited to perform a live stage reading of their 1996 film Brain Candy at the 2014 festival; Kate McKinnon, who performed a one-woman show centred around her celebrity impressions in 2015; and TallBoyz II Men, who developed and launched a sketch comedy television series for CBC Television following their performance at the 2018 festival.

Due to the COVID-19 pandemic in Canada, the festival was staged online in 2021 and 2022. Darrell Faria received a Canadian Screen Award nomination for Best Host in a Web Program or Series at the 10th Canadian Screen Awards in 2022, as host of the 2021 festival's livestreamed awards ceremony.
