= Theresa Tova =

Canadian actress, singer and playwright (born 1955)

Theresa Tova (born 1955) is a Canadian actress, singer and playwright. She is most noted for her play Still the Night, which won several Dora Mavor Moore Awards in 1997 and was a shortlisted finalist for the Governor General's Award for English-language drama at the 1999 Governor General's Awards.

== Early life and education ==
The daughter of Polish Jewish survivors of the Holocaust, Tova was born in Paris, France, and raised in Calgary, Alberta. She studied acting at the University of Alberta.

== Career ==
Primarily a stage and musical theatre actress, she also had a role in the television series E.N.G. in the early-1990s as Marge Atherton, for which she received a Gemini Award nomination for Best Performance by an Actress in a Supporting Role at the 8th Gemini Awards in 1993.

Still the Night, a musical play which combined Jewish music, including vaudeville and klezmer, with the story of two young girls surviving the Holocaust in the forests of Poland, was staged in 1996 by Theatre Passe Muraille. It won four Dora Awards in the Mid-Sized Theatre division in 1997, for outstanding new play or musical, outstanding production, outstanding music (John Alcorn) and outstanding female performance in a musical (Liza Balkan).

Tova has continued to act on stage, including productions of They're Playing Our Song, Fiddler on the Roof and The Diary of Anne Frank, as well as in supporting television, film and web series roles. In 2017, she was elected president of the Toronto chapter of ACTRA.

She was a Canadian Screen Award nominee for Best Lead Performance in a Web Program or Series at the 10th Canadian Screen Awards in 2022 for the web series For the Record.

== Filmography ==
=== Film ===
Year	Title	Role	Notes
1980	Deadline	Honey	
1983	Curtains	Inmate	
1984	Unfinished Business	Sally	
1985	Eleni	Katis' Daughter	
1985	Head Office	Woman Protestor	
1985	Big Deal	Iris Leach	
1986	Dancing in the Dark	Nosey Neighbor	
1990	Love & Murder	Evelyn	
1992	This Is My Life	Rochelle	
2005	Lie with Me	Wedding Singer	
2011	The Seder	Judith	
2012	In Return	Sandy	
2013	It Was You Charlie	Sandra	
2019	Mistletoe & Menorahs	Tovah	
2020	Akilla's Escape	Athena	
2022	Christmas Lucky Charm	Mrs. Barnett	
2024	Meet Me Next Christmas	Debra	

=== Television ===
Year	Title	Role	Notes
1982	Hangin' In	Denise	Episode: "Make Room for Mommy"
1985	Seeing Things	Gloria	Episode: "Defective Vision"
1989–1994	E.N.G.	Marge Atherton	96 episodes
1993	Taking the Heat	Mary	Television film
1994	Against Their Will	Captain Cooney	Television film
1994	Forever Knight	Ms. Sheppard	Episode: "Undue Process"
1995	Degree of Guilt	Dr. Shelton	Television film
1997	Rescuers: Stories of Courage: Two Women	The Abbess	Television film
2005	G-Spot	Mickey	Episode: "Stalker"
2007	ReGenesis	Dr. Lang	Episode: "I Dream of Genomes"
2009	Producing Parker	Jack Cartwright / Jackie	Episode: "Eat, Pray, Parker"
2010–2011	Bolts & Blip	Olga	26 episodes
2014	The Strain	Beverly	Episode: "Loved Ones"
2014	Meet the Family	Mom	3 episodes
2016	Group Home	Dr. Ginsberg	Television film
2018	ClaireVoyant	Madame Sonnom	9 episodes
2019	Anne with an E	Madam Lyudmila	Episode: "The Summit of My Desires"
2020	For the Record	Fiona	2 episodes
2022	Good Sam	Anna	Episode: "Truce"
2022	Pretty Hard Cases	Zorka	Episode: "Crystal Ball"
2022	Workin' Moms	ER Doctor	Episode: "The Break"
2023	Shelved	Michaela Ramos	Episode: "Moby Dick FICTION MEL"
2023	The Wedding Rule	Faye	Television film
