= Project Bakeover =

Canadian reality television series

Project Bakeover is a Canadian reality television series, which debuted on Food Network in 2021. Hosted by chocolatier Steve Hodge and designer Tiffany Pratt, the series features the duo helping struggling bakery businesses to transform their menu and decor.

The first season, consisting of ten episodes, ran as a split, with five episodes airing weekly beginning February 4, 2021, and five more episodes airing from May 27, 2021. A second season premiered in 2022.

The series received two Canadian Screen Award nominations at the 10th Canadian Screen Awards in 2022, for Best Direction in a Lifestyle or Information Program or Series (Naela Choudhary) and Best Editing in a Documentary Program or Series (Otto Chung).

== Season 1 ==
=== Episodes ===
No.	Title	Original release date
1	"The Key Ingredient is Trust"	February 4, 2021
Location: Mrs. Joy's Absolutely Fabulous Treats, Lynchburg, VA; Steve's innovations: Salted Caramel Truffle, Craquelin, Mousse
2	"Maple Makeover"	February 11, 2021
Location: OMG Coffee and Bakeshop, Toronto, ON; Steve's innovations: Focaccia Pizza, Ontario Maple Glazed Cake
3	"Sweet is not a Flavour"	February 18, 2021
Location: Bluegrass & Buttercream, Danville, KY; Steve's innovations: Kentucky Hot Brown Quiche, Brown Butter Banana Bread, Cupcakes made from scratch
4	"Too Many Cooks"	February 25, 2021
Location: Bread 'n Batter, Milton, ON; Steve's innovations: Sans Rival Macarons, Halo Halo Biscuit, Pork & Roasted Pineapple Biscuit
5	"A Fresh Start"	March 4, 2021
Location: Whisk Cake Company, Kelowna, BC; Steve's innovations: Croissant, (Baked) Brioche Donut, Pastry items using locally sourced fruit from the Okanagan Valley
6	"Homemade to Home Run"	May 27, 2021
Location: Mecairo's Cake Company, Etobicoke, ON; Steve's innovations: Chocolate Bonbons, Deconstructed Key Lime Cheesecake Parfait, Mecairo Mini (mini layer cake covered in tempered chocolate)
7	"You Can't Survive on Bread Alone"	June 3, 2021
Location: Skyefire Bakery, Airdrie, AB; Steve's innovations: Mini Bundt Cakes, Flapper Pie Squares, Bread Pudding Cake
8	"A Light in the Dark"	June 10, 2021
Location: The Lighthouse Bakery, Victoria, BC; Steve's innovations: Whoppie Pies, Lighthouse Bread Knots, Raspberry Dream Cake
9	"It's Not All Easy as Pie"	June 17, 2021
Location: The Kneaded Knook Bakery, Straffordville, ON; Steve's innovations: Blackberry Upside Down Cake, Madeleine Sandwiches, Savoury Galette
10	"All Bread, No Dough"	June 24, 2021
Location: Homestead Artisan Bakery + Cafe, Barrie, ON; Steve's innovations: Chocolate & Pistachio Ganache Cake, Cookie Cups, Olive Oil Cake with Roasted Grapes

== Season 2 ==
=== Episodes ===
No.	Title	Original release date
1	"Cute Doesn't Pay the Bills"	March 31, 2022
Location: Kanadell Japanese Bakery, East Vancouver, BC.; Steve's innovations: Matcha Nanaimo Tart, Fluffy Japanese Pancakes, Strawberry Mousse Bombe
2	"Sugar, Squabbles, and Spice"	April 7, 2022
Location: Wannamaker's Bake Shop, Trenton, ON; Steve's innovations: Donut dough Babka, Savoury Tart with Hash Brown Crust, Pavlova
3	"Starting from Scratch"	April 14, 2022
Location: Cake Your Way, Woodbridge, ON; Steve's innovations: Magic Souffle Cake, Decorative Focaccia, Homemade Coloured Marshmallows
4	"Success for all Seasons"	April 21, 2022
Location: Little Cove Bakery, Tobermory, ON; Steve's innovations: Savoury Pot Pie, Naked Butter Tart Cake, S'Mores Surprise
5	"Cake It to the Limit"	April 28, 2022
Location: Lyra Lou Cakes, Surrey, BC; Steve's innovations: 2-layer Citrus Tart, Savoury Stuffed Popovers, Beaded Filled Donuts
6	"How the Cookie Crumbles"	May 5, 2022
Location: Mike's Old Fashioned Bakery, Nashwaaksis, NB; Steve's innovations: Pastry Pockets, Stuffed Gougères, Cookie Dough Cheesecake
7	"The Boss of Bake"	May 12, 2022
Location: Elmvale Bakery, Elmvale, ON; Steve's innovations: Two Layer Fudge, Variety Pull-apart Buns, Bavarian Stacked Waffle Cake
8	"Sweet Serenity Now"	May 19, 2022
Location: Boulangerie Patisserie Italia, Montreal, QC; Steve's innovations: Pesca Con Crema, Italian Nougat Bars, Pizza Palmiers
9	"Fresh Baked Fun"	May 26, 2022
Location: Monkey Cakes, Fredericton, NB; Steve's innovations: Savoury Pinwheels, Swiss Meringue Mini Loaf, Infused Chocolate Bars (including Chili Chocolate Bars)
10	"Perfecting the Patisserie"	June 2, 2022
Location: Boulangerie Mr. Pinchot, Montreal, QC; Steve's innovations: Roulade, Pain Bianco, Lebanese Eclairs
