= Yukon Harvest =

Canadian documentary television series

Yukon Harvest (Dän K’eht’e) is a Canadian documentary television series, which premiered in 2021 on APTN. Shot principally in the Mayo area of Yukon, the series profiles the culture and traditions of hunting among the region's Northern Tutchone people, and receives separate weekly broadcasts in both English and Northern Tutchone language editions.

The series received three Canadian Screen Award nominations at the 10th Canadian Screen Awards in 2022, for Best Factual Program or Series, Best Editing in a Documentary Program or Series (Natalie Glubb) and Best Writing in a Factual Program or Series (Todd Forsbloom and Erik Virtanen).
