= Whatever, Linda =

- Created by: Hannah Cheesman; Julian De Zotti
- Directed by: Matt Eastman
- Country of origin: Canada
- Original language: English
- No. of seasons: 1
- No. of episodes: 10

Production
- Executive producers: Hannah Cheesman, Julian De Zotti, James Milward, Kevin Saffer, Mackenzie Donaldson
- Camera setup: Single-camera
- Running time: 10 minutes

Whatever, Linda is a Canadian web series co-created and co-written by Hannah Cheesman and Julian De Zotti. The series stars Cheesman as Linda Thoroughbred, a woman in the 1970s who gets a job as a secretary for financier Barney Lahnar (inspired by Bernie Madoff) and becomes the real brains behind the Ponzi scheme that will eventually bring him down.

The series was released on YouTube and via an official website in 2014, but was subsequently taken down and re-uploaded to Vimeo. Though the series has struggled to find an audience online, it has screened at festivals internationally, winning critical acclaim and numerous awards.

== Cast ==
- Hannah Cheesman as Linda Thoroughbred
- Terra Hazelton as Annabelle Nascimento
- Cara Ricketts as Didi De May
- Martha MacIsaac as Pepper Bannerman
- Mike Shara as Drew Cashton
- Brendan Gall as Henry Sullivan
- Julian Richings as Aloysius Finkle
- Graydon Sheppard as Edie
- Sheila McCarthy as Sheila Hardy

== Reception ==
After being released online through Vimeo, the series has struggled to find an audience online; despite this, it has screened at festivals internationally, winning critical acclaim and numerous awards.

The series garnered a Canadian Screen Award nomination for Original Program or Series Produced for Digital Media, Fiction at the 3rd Canadian Screen Awards, and both Cheesman and Hazelton garnered acting nominations in the Performance in a Program or Series Produced for Digital Media category. The series won three awards at the 2015 Vancouver Web Series Festival, including Best Drama Series.

WebVeeGuide.com called Cheesman "a revelation, and is more than worthy of the acclaim she and the show are receiving."

== Television series adaptation ==
In 2016, Cheesman announced on Twitter that they are in development with Mark Gordon to create a television series based on the web series.
