= For the Record (web series) =

- Created by: Julian De Zotti
- Country of origin: Canada
- No. of episodes: 6

Original release
- Network: CBC Gem
- Release: 2020

For the Record is a Canadian comedy drama web series, which premiered in 2020 on CBC Gem. Created by Julian De Zotti, the six-episode anthology series centres on the emotional role of music in people's lives, with each episode focusing on a character facing a significant personal moment and the song that soundtracks it.

The cast includes De Zotti, Lisa Baylin, Anna Hopkins, Karen LeBlanc, Kira Clavell, Maurice Dean Wint, Moni Ogunsuyi, Theresa Tova, Phil Borg, Lyriq Bent, Alexandra Beaton, Uni Park, Johnny Orlando, Melissa McNerney, Justine Nelson, Alannah Ong, Brynn Chamblee, Tashi Simmons and Neil Lu.

The series was originally produced for CTV's planned Snackable web service, but moved to CBC Gem after Snackable was shelved.

The French firm Mediawan purchased international distribution rights to the series.

The series received eight award nominations at the 10th Canadian Screen Awards, but did not win any.

== Awards ==
Award	Date of ceremony	Category	Recipient(s)	Result	Ref(s)
Canadian Screen Awards	2022	Best Web Program or Series, Fiction	Julian De Zotti, Jonas Diamond, Lisa Baylin	Nominated	
Canadian Screen Awards	2022	Best Lead Performance in a Web Program or Series	Lyriq Bent	Nominated	
Canadian Screen Awards	2022	Best Lead Performance in a Web Program or Series	Julian De Zotti	Nominated	
Canadian Screen Awards	2022	Best Lead Performance in a Web Program or Series	Anna Hopkins	Nominated	
Canadian Screen Awards	2022	Best Supporting Performance in a Web Program or Series	Karen Leblanc	Nominated	
Canadian Screen Awards	2022	Best Supporting Performance in a Web Program or Series	Theresa Tova	Nominated	
Canadian Screen Awards	2022	Best Supporting Performance in a Web Program or Series	Maurice Dean Wint	Nominated	
Canadian Screen Awards	2022	Best Direction in a Web Program or Series	Sudz Sutherland	Nominated	
