= Anna Hopkins =

Canadian actress

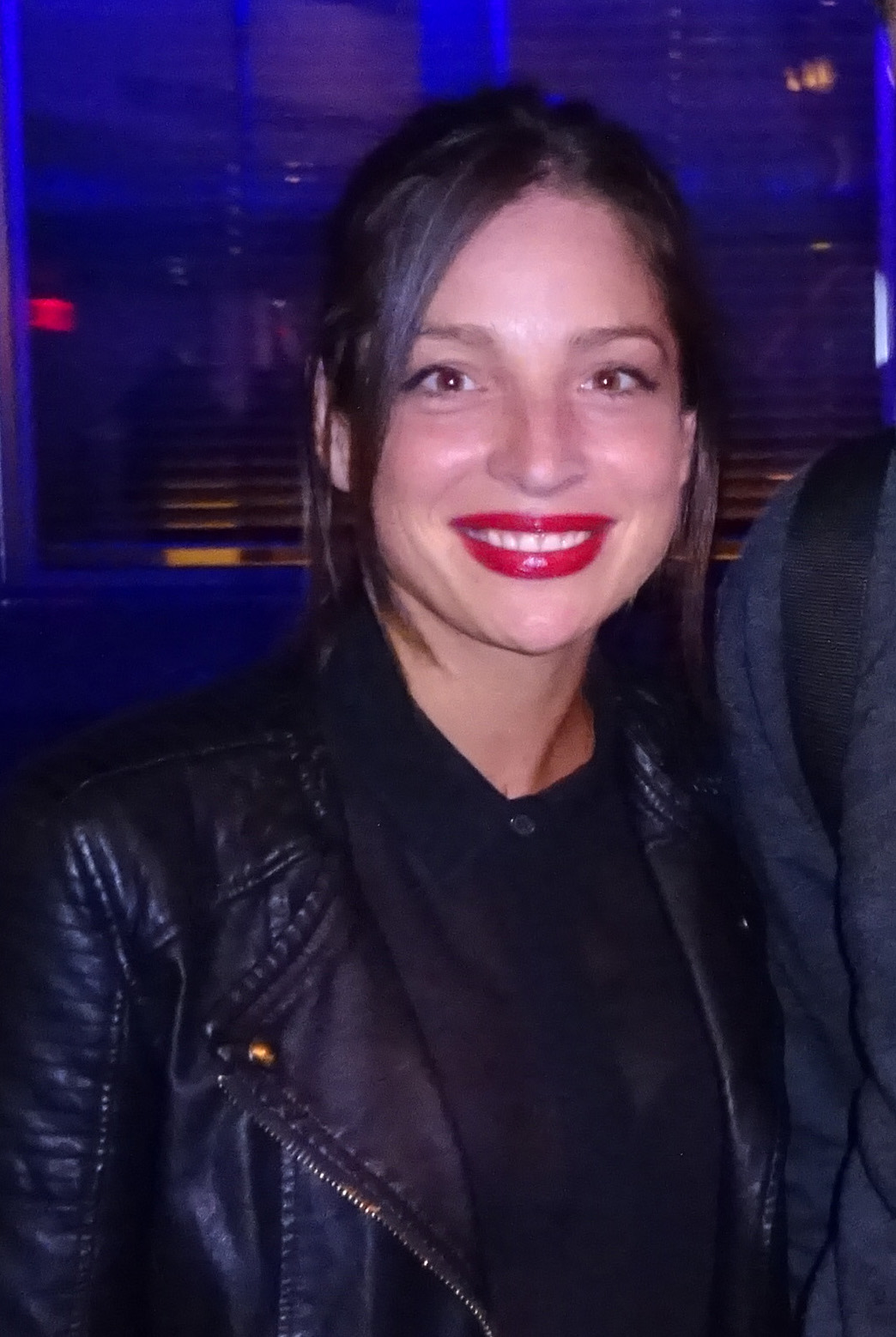
- Hopkins at the 2016 Tribeca Film Festival
- Born: February 12, 1987 (age 39); Montreal, Quebec, Canada
- Education: Concordia University; Paris Institute of Political Studies
- Occupation: Actress
- Years active: 2005–present

Anna Hopkins (born February 12, 1987) is a Canadian actress. She is best known for her role as Lilith in Freeform's original series Shadowhunters and documentary filmmaker Monica Stuart in The Expanse.

== Early life and education ==
Hopkins was born in Montreal to Rita Hopkins, a graphic designer, and visual artist Tom Hopkins. She is of Jewish Romanian and Hungarian descent from her mother's side, and Scottish, Welsh descent on her father's side. She is fluent in French and English. She trained in hip hop dancing and planned to start a dancing career after high-school when her interests shifted to theatre.

In 2012 Hopkins earned a Bachelor of Arts in Communication Studies from Concordia University and a Bachelor of Arts and Science from the Paris Institute of Political Studies in Paris.

== Career ==
Hopkins first appeared in the miniseries Human Trafficking in 2005, and then after in Canadian television series and television films, among them the character of Samantha Clayton in a crossover of The Flash and Arrow in 2014, and was credited as writer for Girl Couch. She also played in Barney's Version (2010) alongside Paul Giamatti and Dustin Hoffman, and The Grand Seduction starring Brendan Gleeson in 2013. One of her better-known roles was the recurring character Jessica 'Berlin' Rainer in the second and third seasons of the sci-fi series Defiance. Hopkins was promoted to series regular for the third, and last season; Defiance was cancelled by SyFy on 16 October 2015.

She was a Canadian Screen Award nominee for Best Lead Performance in a Web Program or Series at the 10th Canadian Screen Awards in 2022 for the web series For the Record.

Hopkins has directed a number of short films, with her third film Dish Pit premiering in the Short Cuts program at the 2025 Toronto International Film Festival. She is also a co-owner of Danny's Pizza Tavern in Toronto's Little Italy neighbourhood, where Dish Pit was filmed. The film was nominated for Best Short Film at the 2025 Directors Guild of Canada awards.

== Filmography ==
Year	Title	Role	Notes
2005	Stranger	Marie	Short film
2005	Human Trafficking	Katerina	Miniseries, 4 episodes
2006	Circle of Friends	Lesley Wilson	TV film
2007	Killer Wave	Mel	Miniseries, 2 episodes
2007	Reality Check	Shannon	Short film
2007	Too Young to Marry	Sophie	TV film
2007	The Dead Zone	Waitress	TV series, 1 episode "Denouement"
2009	Out of Control	Young Woman	TV film
2010	Tom Clancy's Splinter Cell: Conviction	Monument Visitor / Civilian / Carnival Attendee (voice)	Video game
2010	Barney's Version	Kate Panofsky	
2013	Nikita	Kate Barrett	TV series, 1 episode "Survival Instincts"
2013	The Grand Seduction	Helen (voice)	
2013	It Was You Charlie	Madeleine	
2014	Watch Dogs	Nicky Pearce (voice)	Video game
2014	Cazzette: Sleepless		Short film
2014	Julia Julep	Alex	Short film
2014	The Masters of Suspense (Les Maîtres du suspense)	Alyssa	
2014–2015	Defiance	Jessica 'Berlin' Rainer	TV series, 21 episodes
2014–2015	The Flash	Samantha Clayton	TV series, 2 episodes
2014–2017	Arrow	Samantha Clayton	TV series, 5 episodes
2015	Girl Couch	Meredith	Short film
2015	Lost Girl	Brinkley White	TV series, 1 episode "Clear Eyes, Fae Hearts"
2015	After the Ball	Simone	
2015	Never Happened	Sharon	Short film
2015	The Boy	The Girl	Short film
2016	Jean of the Joneses	Maxine	
2017	Lâcher prise	Nina	TV series, 2 episodes
2017	Ransom	Annie Kapila	TV series, 2 episodes (season 1)
2017	Dark Matter	Ambrosia	TV series, 1 episode "Give It Up, Princess"
2018	Killjoys	Fairuza	TV series, 2 episode (season 4)
2018	Bad Blood	Teresa Langana	TV series, 8 episodes (season 2)
2018	Final Offer	Olivia	Short film
2018	The Give and Take	Mom	Short film
2018	Red Rover	Maya	
2018–2019	Shadowhunters	Lilith	TV series, 14 episodes (season 3)
2020	Is There a Killer in My Family?	Carly Travers	TV film
2020	Transplant	Selena Ruis	TV series, 1 episode "Far From Home"
2020	Tin Can	Fret	
2018, 2020–2022	The Expanse	Monica Stuart	TV series, 20 episodes
2021	V/H/S/94	Holly Marciano	Segment Storm Drain
2021	Letterkenny	Lisa	TV series, 1 episode
2021	For the Record		
2021	Hudson & Rex	Pam Hasselbock / Margo Novak	TV series, 1 episode (Series 3)
2023	Stolen Baby: The Murder of Heidi Broussard	Heidi Broussard	TV movie
2025	A Christmas Cookbook	Carrie	TV movie
2026	I Will Find You	Lena Fisher	Miniseries
2026	Lydia and the Mist Rider	Eshara	Voice role

== Awards and nominations ==
- 2011 ACTRA Montreal Awards, nominated as Outstanding Performance - Female for Barney's Version.
- 2018 TV Scoop Awards, nominated as Best Drama Actress and Best Villain for Lilith on Shadowhunters
- 2018 Teen Choice Awards, nominated as Choice TV: Villain for Lilith on Shadowhunters
