= Dead Man's Switch: A Crypto Mystery =

2021 Canadian documentary film

- Directed by: Sheona McDonald
- Written by: Sheona McDonald
- Produced by: Sheona McDonald; Betsy Carson
- Cinematography: Simon Schneider; Monica Guddat
- Edited by: Ness Van Hassel
- Production company: Dimestore Productions
- Distributed by: CBC Television; Discovery+
- Release date: April 29, 2021 (Hot Docs)
- Running time: 78 minutes
- Country: Canada
- Language: English

Dead Man's Switch: A Crypto Mystery is a Canadian documentary film, directed by Sheona McDonald and released in 2021. The film is a portrait of the controversy around Gerald Cotten, the Canadian cryptocurrency entrepreneur whose disappearance and alleged death in December 2018 left many investors unable to access their money because Cotten was the only person who knew the password to the firm's cold wallet.

The film premiered in April 2021 at the Hot Docs Canadian International Documentary Festival, before having its television premiere in September on CBC Television and CBC Gem. In December, it premiered on Discovery+ in the United States.

== Awards ==
| Award | Date of ceremony | Category | Recipient(s) | Result | Ref(s) |
|---|---|---|---|---|---|
| Canadian Screen Awards | 2022 | Best Documentary Program | Sheona McDonald, Betsy Carson | Nominated | |
| Canadian Screen Awards | 2022 | Best Photography in a Documentary Program or Factual Series | Simon Schneider, Monica Guddat | Nominated | |
| Canadian Screen Awards | 2022 | Best Editing in a Documentary Program or Series | Ness Van Hassel | Nominated | |
| Canadian Screen Awards | 2022 | Best Direction in a Documentary Program | Sheona McDonald | Nominated | |
| Canadian Screen Awards | 2022 | Best Writing in a Documentary Program | Sheona McDonald | Nominated | |

== See also ==
- David Gerard - interviewed in the film
