= Motel Makeover =

Canadian television series

- Directed by: Jessica Nahmias
- Country of origin: Canada
- Original language: English
- No. of episodes: 6

Production
- Executive producers: Cathie James; Lesia Capone
- Production company: Proper Television

Original release
- Network: Netflix

Motel Makeover is a Canadian reality television series, which premiered August 25, 2021 on Netflix. The series centres on Sarah Sklash and April Brown, two entrepreneurs who have purchased a decrepit motel in Sauble Beach, Ontario, and are renovating it into an upscale boutique motel.

In advance of the official series premiere, two episodes were screened in a special event at the Mustang Drive-In, the duo's first boutique motel renovation in Prince Edward County.

The series was produced by Boat Rocker Media through its Proper Television division.

The series received three Canadian Screen Award nominations at the 10th Canadian Screen Awards in 2022, for Best Lifestyle Program or Series, Best Editing in a Documentary Program or Series (Samantha Shields) and Best Direction in a Lifestyle or Information Program or Series (Jessica Nahmias).

The graphics featured on every episode are made by an outside company called NEEZO Studios.

== Episodes ==
No.	Title	Original release date
1	"Home Sweet Motel"	August 26, 2021
2	"Good Vibes Only"	August 26, 2021
3	"Fit For A King"	August 26, 2021
4	"The Motel Must Go On"	August 26, 2021
5	"Come Rain or Shine"	August 26, 2021
6	"Opening Weekend"	August 26, 2021
