= Belle Puri =

Canadian journalist

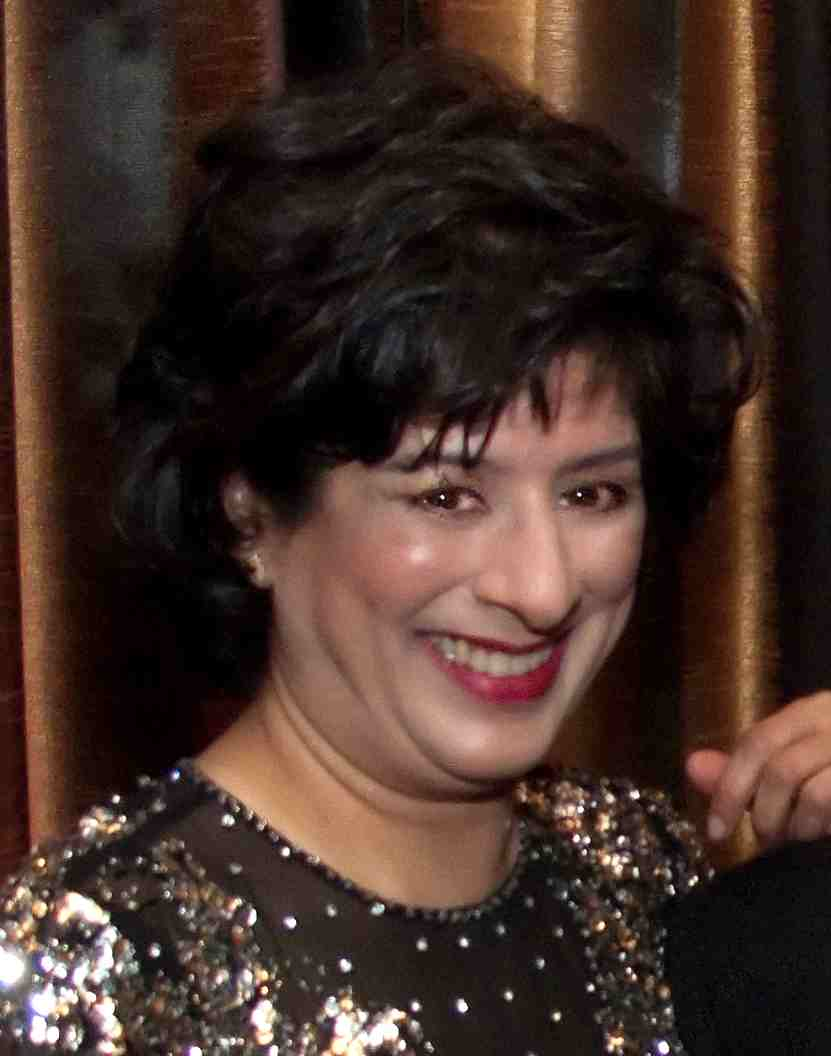
- Belle Puri at the Royal Columbian Hospital Foundation gala.
- Born: British Columbia
- Occupation: Journalist
- Known for: Said to be Canada's first broadcast journalist of South Asian descent

Belle Puri is a Canadian journalist.

During a career that has spanned more than three decades Puri has been a business reporter and a legislative reporter. On October 28, 2010, the office of British Columbia Premier Gordon Campbell announced he had appointed Puri his press secretary.

However, Campbell resigned five days later, before Puri took up this position.

Nevertheless, Puri had restrictions put on the kinds of reporting she could do—in particular she was removed from the legislative beat.

Charlie Smith, writing in the Georgia Straight, cited Puri as an instance of a CBC reporter who gave the appearance she might have ties with BC politicians that should preclude her from reporting on the legislature.

In 2005 Puri was recognized with British Columbia's Jack Webster Award for outstanding journalism.

In 2022, she won the Canadian Screen Award for Best Local Journalist at the 10th Canadian Screen Awards.

Puri is the chair of the Royal Columbian Hospital Foundation.
