= Fresh Water (film) =

Canadian documentary film

- Genre: Documentary
- Directed by: David Kalinauskas
- Country of origin: Canada
- Original language: English

Production
- Cinematography: Andrew Curr
- Running time: 43 minutes
- Production company: Airfoil Media

Original release
- Network: Crave
- Release: July 5, 2021

Fresh Water is a Canadian documentary film, directed by David Kalinauskas and released in 2021. The film is a portrait of Antonio Lennert, a gay surfer from Brazil who moved to Toronto after marrying a Canadian partner, and became the owner of the Surf the Greats surf shop and a participant in the city's thriving subculture of freshwater surfers who ride the waves of Lake Ontario when they rise in bad weather.

The film premiered July 5, 2021 on Crave.

The film was a Canadian Screen Award nominee for Best Documentary Program at the 10th Canadian Screen Awards in 2022.
