= Toronto Film Critics Association Awards 2020 =

Entertainment accolade

24th Toronto Film Critics Association Awards
- Date: February 7, 2021

Highlights
- Best Picture: Nomadland
- Most awards: Nomadland (3)
- Most nominations: Nomadland and Minari (4)

The 24th Toronto Film Critics Association Awards, honoring the best in film for 2020, were announced on February 7, 2021.

Anne at 13,000 ft was declared the winner of the Rogers Best Canadian Film Award in the virtual gala held March 9, 2021.

The award presentation, hosted by Elaine Lui and Kathleen Newman-Bremang, was livestreamed on the internet. Lui and Newman-Bremang received a Canadian Screen Award nomination for Best Host in a Web Program or Series at the 10th Canadian Screen Awards in 2022.

== Winners ==
Category	Winners and nominees	Films
Best Film	Chloé Zhao	Nomadland
Best Film	Kelly Reichardt	First Cow
Best Film	Lee Isaac Chung	Minari
Rogers Best Canadian Film Award	Kazik Radwanski	Anne at 13,000 Ft.
Rogers Best Canadian Film Award	Louise Archambault	And the Birds Rained Down
Rogers Best Canadian Film Award	Yonah Lewis and Calvin Thomas	White Lie
Best Actor	Riz Ahmed	Sound of Metal
Best Actor	Chadwick Boseman	Ma Rainey's Black Bottom
Best Actor	Mads Mikkelsen	Another Round (Druk)
Best Actress	Frances McDormand	Nomadland
Best Actress	Viola Davis	Ma Rainey’s Black Bottom
Best Actress	Sidney Flanigan	Never Rarely Sometimes Always
Best Supporting Actor	Daniel Kaluuya	Judas and the Black Messiah
Best Supporting Actor	Leslie Odom Jr.	One Night in Miami...
Best Supporting Actor	Paul Raci	Sound of Metal
Best Supporting Actress	Maria Bakalova	Borat Subsequent Moviefilm
Best Supporting Actress	Olivia Colman	The Father
Best Supporting Actress	Youn Yuh-jung	Minari
Best Director	Chloé Zhao	Nomadland
Best Director	Kelly Reichardt	First Cow
Best Director	Lee Isaac Chung	Minari
Best Screenplay	Lee Isaac Chung	Minari
Best Screenplay	Darius Marder, Abraham Marder	Sound of Metal
Best Screenplay	Chloé Zhao	Nomadland
Best First Feature	Radha Blank	The Forty-Year-Old Version
Best First Feature	Emerald Fennell	Promising Young Woman
Best First Feature	Florian Zeller	The Father
Best Animated Film	Tomm Moore, Ross Stewart	Wolfwalkers
Best Animated Film	Pete Docter	Soul
Best Animated Film	Kris Pearn	The Willoughbys
Best Foreign-Language Film	Kleber Mendonça Filho	Bacurau
Best Foreign-Language Film	Kantemir Balagov	Beanpole
Best Foreign-Language Film	Thomas Vinterberg	Another Round (Druk)
Allan King Documentary Award	Alexander Nanau	Collective
Allan King Documentary Award	Garrett Bradley	Time
Allan King Documentary Award	Spike Lee	American Utopia
Allan King Documentary Award	Nicole Newnham, James LeBrecht	Crip Camp
Jay Scott Prize	Kelly Fyffe-Marshall	
Clyde Gilmour Award	Jason Ryle	
Cineplex Emerging Critic Award	Mark Hanson	
Cineplex Emerging Critic Award	Rose Ho	
