= History Erased =

Canadian documentary television series

History Erased is a Canadian documentary television series, which premiered in 2019 on History. The series explores the importance of various topics by presenting various conceptions of how the world might have changed if the topic had never been created or invented.

Created by Cream Productions, the series was an expansion of The World Without Canada, a three-part documentary series aired in 2017 which portrayed ways in which the world would have changed if Canada had never existed. The first two seasons of the series continued to explore how the world might have changed if other countries had also never come into being; beginning with the third season, the focus shifted to individual inventions or natural phenomena.

Brian Rice received a Canadian Screen Award nomination for Best Direction in a Documentary Series at the 8th Canadian Screen Awards in 2020, for the episode "United Kingdom". At the 10th Canadian Screen Awards in 2022, the series was nominated for Best History Documentary Program or Series, and Aidan Denison, James Broadley and Chorong Kim were nominated for Best Editorial Research for the episode "Bees, Bugs & Spiders".
