= Oscar Peterson: Black + White =

- Film poster
- Directed by: Barry Avrich
- Produced by: Barry Avrich; Mark Selby
- Cinematography: Ken Ng
- Edited by: Nicholas Kleiman
- Music by: Robi Botos
- Production company: Melbar Entertainment Group
- Distributed by: Bell Media; Fremantle Media
- Release date: September 11, 2021 (TIFF)
- Running time: 81 minutes
- Country: Canada
- Language: English

Oscar Peterson: Black + White is a 2021 Canadian documentary film directed by Barry Avrich. The film is a portrait of influential Canadian jazz icon Oscar Peterson, featuring interviews with and performances of his music by figures including Billy Joel, Jon Batiste, Quincy Jones, Ramsey Lewis, Herbie Hancock, Branford Marsalis, Dave Young, Larnell Lewis, Jackie Richardson, Joe Sealy, Measha Brueggergosman, Denzal Sinclaire, Robi Botos and Stu Harrison.

The film premiered at the 2021 Toronto International Film Festival. It was distributed in Canada by Bell Media as a Crave Original, and internationally by Fremantle Media.

== Reception ==
On the review aggregator website Rotten Tomatoes, 73% of 11 critics' reviews are positive. Metacritic, which uses a weighted average, assigned the film a score of 62 out of 100, based on five critics, indicating "generally favorable" reviews.

=== Awards ===
Award	Date of ceremony	Category	Recipient(s)	Result	Ref(s)
Canadian Screen Awards	2022	Best Biography or Arts Documentary Program or Series	Randy Lennox, Jeffrey Latimer, Barry Avrich, Mark Selby	Won	
Canadian Screen Awards	2022	Best Direction in a Documentary Program	Barry Avrich	Won	
Canadian Screen Awards	2022	Best Visual Research	Mark Selby	Won	
Canadian Screen Awards	2022	Best Editing in a Documentary Program or Series	Nicolas Kleiman	Nominated	
Canadian Screen Awards	2022	Best Sound in a Non-Fiction Program or Series	Doug McClement, Richard Spence-Thomas, Teresa Morrow, Gary Vaughan	Won	
Canadian Screen Awards	2022	Best Writing in a Documentary Program	Barry Avrich	Nominated	
