= Tina House =

Canadian television journalist

Tina House is a Canadian television journalist, who has been a Vancouver bureau reporter for APTN National News since 2007.

In 2010, she won the Amnesty International Canada Human Rights Journalism Award for her APTN Investigates reportage on missing and murdered Indigenous women. In 2022, she won the Canadian Screen Award for Best National Reporter at the 10th Canadian Screen Awards.
