= Miss Persona =

Canadian children's television series

Miss Persona is a Canadian children's television program for preschoolers, which premiered in 2018. Inspired by past programs such as The Big Comfy Couch and Mr. Dressup, the series was created by children's entertainer Kimberly Persona, and features her in character as a woman who lives in a treehouse in the forest with her teddy bear friend Brandon, and uses songs, games and dress-up role play to teach children how to solve problems.

The show's cast also includes Brandon Lane, Kyle Dooley, Andrew Hunt, Alyson Court, Joseph Motiki, Fred Penner, and professional wrestler Santino Marella, with puppeteers Mike Petersen, and Ingrid Hansen.

The show premiered as a web series on Treehouse TV's YouTube channel in 2018, before being added to the schedule of Treehouse's linear television channel in 2019.

In 2020, Persona starred in a special public service announcement to educate kids about the COVID-19 pandemic. In 2021, it became the first Treehouse TV show to include an age-appropriate LGBTQ-themed storyline, with Miss Persona's mother (Jane McClelland) marrying her partner Lorna (Elvira Kurt).

The series received two Daytime Emmy Award nominations, for Outstanding Preschool Series and Outstanding Performer in a Children's, Family Viewing or Special Class Program, at the 46th Daytime Emmy Awards in 2019, and two Canadian Screen Award nominations, for Best Preschool Program or Series and the Shaw Rocket Fund Kids Choice award, at the 10th Canadian Screen Awards in 2022.
