= Kayla Grey =

Canadian television sportscaster (born 1993)

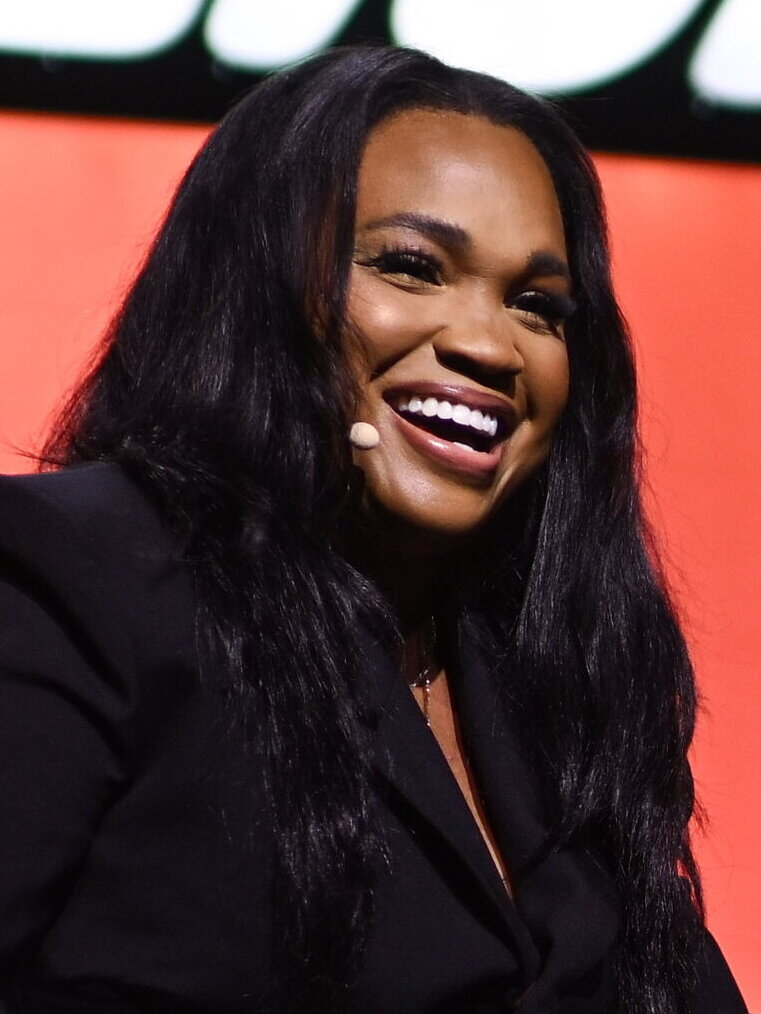
- Born: January 2, 1993 (age 33)
- Citizenship: Canadian
- Occupation: Canadian television host
- Television: Sportscentre, The Amazing Race Canada: The Ride Along

Kayla Grey (born January 2, 1993) is a Canadian television sportscaster, currently working as an anchor for SportsCentre on TSN.

== Career ==
A graduate of Toronto's College of Sports Media, Grey began her broadcasting career in Winnipeg as a Digital Broadcast Journalist for Global News. She then moved to Prince Rupert, BC to become a senior reporter for CFTK-TV news. The Toronto native joined TSN in 2015 as an on-air update anchor and radio producer for TSN 1050. Kayla Grey became an anchor and reporter for TSN in 2017. When she made her debut on Sportscentre on January 19, 2018, Grey became the first black woman to ever host a flagship sports highlight show in Canada.

She also makes frequent appearances on TSN Radio 1050 in Toronto and TSN Radio 1150 in Hamilton covering the Toronto Raptors, and contributes regular sports updates to CTV’s Your Morning. In 2019, Grey reported on the Toronto Raptors historic NBA championship run for TSN. She also joined CTV's fan-favourite reality series The Amazing Race Canada 7 as an official race correspondent for Etalk and also hosted The Amazing Race Canada: The Ride Along. Most recently, it was announced that Grey will host the weekend edition of SPORTS AM by TSN on the new American short-form mobile video platform Quibi.

Grey is the host and co-executive producer for The Shift With Kayla Grey. In 2020, she was named Chatelaine's Woman of the Year and Refinery 29s Powerhouse Women. In 2022, she was named alongside Kathleen Newman-Bremang and Amanda Parris as one of the recipients of the Academy of Canadian Cinema and Television's inaugural Changemaker Award at the 10th Canadian Screen Awards.

== Personal life ==
Her hometown is Toronto, Ontario.

She attended Don Mills Collegiate in North York, Ontario.

Grey has a son named Levi.
