= Karen LeBlanc =

Canadian actress (active 1992– )

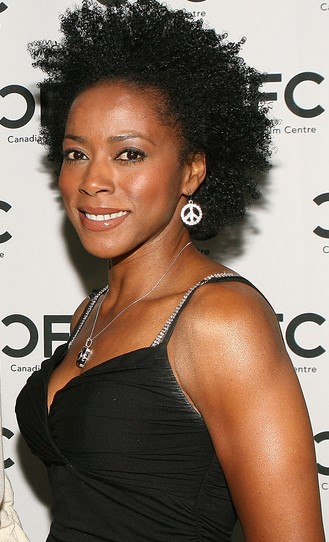
- LeBlanc in 2017
- Occupations: Actress, singer
- Years active: 1992–present

Karen LeBlanc is a Canadian musical theatre actress and singer.

== Early life ==
LeBlanc grew up in Tottenham, Ontario to family from Nova Scotia. She attended the musical theatre program at Sheridan College.

== Career ==
Starting with a minor role in the 1992 television movie Split Images, LeBlanc's credits include guest appearances in television series including Trailer Park Boys, Producing Parker, Soul Food, Mutant X, and most notable The Playboy Club (2011) playing Tina Turner and singing two of Turner's signature songs, "Shake a Tail Feather" and "I Want to Be Made Over". As regular, she first starred in the final season of the CBC sitcom Material World from 1992 to 1993. She appeared in 2000 fantasy-comedy film Santa Who? starring Leslie Nielsen. She co-starred in a number of made-for-television movies, including Snap Decision (2001), Guilt by Association (2002), Lucky Day (2002), Martha: Behind Bars (2005), Knights of the South Bronx (2005), and Battlestar Galactica: Blood & Chrome (2012). On stage, she has appeared in productions of Outrageous!, Rent. and Cinderella. She has also performed as a backing vocalist for Chaka Khan, Rik Emmett and Glass Tiger.

LeBlanc starred in the short-lived the CW drama series Runaway in 2006. For her recurring role in ReGenesis, she was nominated for Gemini Awards for Best Performance by an Actress in a Guest Role, Dramatic Series in 2008. In 2009, LeBlanc received positive reviews and Canadian Screen Award for Best Actress nomination for her performance in the drama film Nurse.Fighter.Boy. Her other film credits include Make It Happen (2008) and Dolan's Cadillac (2009). Also that year, she starred in the ABC drama series, Defying Gravity. Her other series regular credits including Soul (2009), Shattered (2010–11), Cracked (2013), Insomnia (2018), Frontier (2017–18), and Ransom (2018-19). She also had a recurring roles in Motive, Trailer Park Boys and Killjoys. As regular, LeBlanc starred on the second season of Peacock series Departure in 2021, and in 2022 starred in the Oprah Winfrey Network prime time soap opera The Kings of Napa. Also in 2022 had the role of as Dr. Lilly Crawford, in CBS's Fire Country.

She was a Canadian Screen Award nominee for Best Lead Performance in a Web Program or Series at the 10th Canadian Screen Awards in 2022 for the web series For the Record.

== Awards and nominations ==
Year	Award	Category	Nominated work	Result	Ref.
2008	Gemini Awards	Best Performance by an Actress in a Guest Role, Dramatic Series	ReGenesis	Nominated	
2009	ACTRA Award	Outstanding Performance - Female	Nurse.Fighter.Boy	Nominated	
2009	Atlantic Film Festival	Best Actress	Nurse.Fighter.Boy	Won	
2009	Canadian Screen Awards	Best Actress	Nurse.Fighter.Boy	Nominated	
2022	Canadian Screen Awards	Best Supporting Performance, Web Program or Series	For the Record	Nominated	
2023	Canadian Screen Awards	Best Supporting Performance in a Drama Program or Series	Departure	Nominated	
