= Alicia K. Harris =

Canadian film director and screenwriter

- Occupation: Filmmaker
- Website: https://www.aliciakharris.com/

Alicia K. Harris is a Canadian film director and screenwriter based in Scarborough, Ontario. She attracted critical acclaim for her 2019 short film Pick, which won the Canadian Screen Award for Best Live Action Short Drama at the 8th Canadian Screen Awards in 2020.

Her short film On a Sunday at Eleven subsequently won the same award at the 13th Canadian Screen Awards in 2025.

== Early life and education ==
Harris graduated from the Ryerson's School of Image Arts. She is a graduate of the film program at Toronto Metropolitan University and alumna of the Canadian Academy's Directing Program for Women.

== Career ==
Harris wrote and directed her first short film, Fatherhood, in 2014, and won a local filmmaking award at the Scarborough Worldwide Film Festival. She followed up with the short films All Things But Forget (2015), Love Stinks (2016), Maybe If It Were a Nice Room (2017), and On a Sunday at Eleven (2024), and has directed episodes of the Canadian television series Lockdown, The Parker Andersons, and Amelia Parker.

In 2018, she was one of eight women filmmakers selected for the Academy of Canadian Cinema and Television's Apprenticeship for Women Directors program, alongside Kathleen Hepburn, Kirsten Carthew, Allison White, Asia Youngman, Tiffany Hsiung, Halima Ouardiri, and Kristina Wagenbauer.

Her 2019 short film Pick won the Canadian Screen Award for Best Live Action Short Drama at the 8th Canadian Screen Awards in 2020.

For the 2020 Polaris Music Prize, which followed a unique format of commissioning filmmakers to make short films inspired by the shortlisted albums due to the COVID-19 pandemic in Canada preventing the staging of a traditional gala, Harris created a film based on Jessie Reyez's album Before Love Came to Kill Us.

In 2021, Harris directed Blackberries, a short film written by Canadian screenwriter Miali-Elise Coley-Sudlovenick, for CBC Gem and Obsidian Theatre's 21 Black Futures project.

The music video for Savannah Ré's single "Solid", which Harris directed, was a nominee for the 2021 Prism Prize. She received a Canadian Screen Award nomination for Best Direction in a Web Program or Series at the 10th Canadian Screen Awards in 2022, for the web series Next Stop.

Harris co-founded the boutique production company, Sugar Glass Films.

At the 13th Canadian Screen Awards in 2025, in addition to her Best Live Action Short Drama win for On a Sunday at Eleven, Harris also won the award for Best Direction in a Children's or Youth Program or Series for her work on the television series Beyond Black Beauty.
