= Mass Hysterical: A Comedic Cantata =

Mass Hysterical: A Comedic Cantata is a Canadian stage show, which premiered as an online web special in December 2020. Created by Carly Heffernan and Matthew Reid in collaboration with the Toronto Symphony Orchestra as a sequel to the 2014 hit The Second City Guide to the Symphony, the show presented a comedic look at the history of classical and liturgical music in the church.

The show was hosted by Colin Mochrie. The participating comedians were Heffernan, Ashley Comeau, Darryl Hinds and Kris Siddiqi, with Reid, Julia Dawson and Russell Braun participating as musicians.

Due to the COVID-19 pandemic in Canada, it premiered in an online presentation. A portion of the proceeds from ticket sales were donated to the Kingston Road United Church's Raise Our Roof fundraising campaign.

The webcast received two Canadian Screen Award nominations at the 10th Canadian Screen Awards in 2022, for Best Lead Performance in a Web Program or Series (Mochrie) and Best Writing in a Web Program or Series (Heffernan, Reid).
