= Darryl Hinds =

Canadian actor and sketch comedian

Darryl Hinds is a Canadian actor and sketch comedian, best known as a cast member of Royal Canadian Air Farce's annual New Year's Eve specials in the 2010s.

== Early life ==
Hinds was born in Canada to Jamaican immigrants, with an Afro-Jamaican father and an Indo-Caribbean mother.

== Career ==
He had stage acting roles in his early career, and was a member of the sketch comedy troupe Electric Boogaloo, before joining the Toronto company of The Second City in 2007 as a cast member in the revue Facebook of Revelations. He also starred in the 2008 revue Barack to the Future, in which he appeared in several sketches as Barack Obama, and in the 2009 shows 0% Down, 100% Screwed and Shut Up and Show Us Your Tweets.

He joined the Royal Canadian Air Farce for a 2014 special, remaining with the troupe until their final special in 2019.

In 2020, he participated in Mass Hysterical: A Comedic Cantata, a webcast collaboration between Second City alumni and the Toronto Symphony Orchestra which presented a comedic history of the use of classical and liturgical music in the church.

As an actor, he has had recurring or guest roles in the television series Combat Hospital, Little Mosque on the Prairie, Rookie Blue, Odd Squad and Murdoch Mysteries, and a starring role in the 2021 family sitcom Overlord and the Underwoods. He received a Canadian Screen Award nomination for Best Actor in a Comedy Series at the 10th Canadian Screen Awards in 2022, for Overlord and the Underwoods.

== Filmography ==
=== Film ===
Year	Title	Role	Notes
2020	Vicious Fun	Doctor	
2023	Mother of All Shows	Alan	
2026	Because of Cupid	E.J. Cortland	Hallmark film

=== Television ===
Year	Title	Role	Notes
2004	Crimes of Fashion	Video Director	Television film
2005	Kevin Hill	Jury Foreperson - A	Episode: "Sacrificial Lambs"
2009–2011	Little Mosque on the Prairie	Yousef	18 episodes
2011	She's the Mayor	Joseph	Episode: "Uncommon Courtesy"
2011	Almost Heroes	Cop	Episode: "Terry and Peter vs. Their Hero"
2011	Combat Hospital	Captain Ray Ludford	2 episodes
2011	Dan for Mayor	Reporter	5 episodes
2011	Being Erica	Sebastian	Episode: "Born This Way"
2012	I, Martin Short, Goes Home	Indian #1	Television film
2012	Degrassi: The Next Generation	Comedian	Episode: "Hollaback Girl: Part 2"
2012	My Babysitter's a Vampire	Vance Munce / Gabe	3 episodes
2012	Rookie Blue	Officer Salvador	Episode: "Every Man"
2013	Lost Girl	Choga	Episode: "Groundhog Fae"
2014	Working the Engels	Desmond	Episode: "Picture Night"
2014	Touring T.O.	Saheed	Episode: "A Bridge to Nowhere"
2014	Max & Shred	Mr. Papadopulos	Episode: "The Snow Day Variety Method"
2014–2016	Odd Squad	Coach Roberts	6 episodes
2014–2019	Royal Canadian Air Farce	Various	6 episodes
2016	Ice Girls	Ben	Television film
2016	Terrific Trucks Save Christmas	Reginald Davies	Television film
2017	Murdoch Mysteries	Sebastien Melrose	Episode: "A Murdog Mystery"
2017	The Beaverton	Dr. Thomas Braymore	2 episodes
2017	Saving Hope	Howard Lee	Episode: "La Famiglia"
2017	Jib & Jab on a Quest	Farmer Hackle	Television film
2018	Designated Survivor	U.D. Agent	Episode: "Original Sin"
2018	The Expanse	Chief	Episode: "Triple Point"
2018, 2019	Private Eyes	Jeffrey Sanders	2 episodes
2019	The Ninth	Kashvi 'Cash Money' Suthakar	8 episodes
2019	Good Witch	Harold Bunker	Episode: "The Road Trip"
2019	Christmas in Montana	Stephen	Television film
2019	Bit Playas	Brown Actor	Episode: "Auditions"
2020	The Crossword Mysteries	Antiques Dealer	Episode: "Abracadaver"
2020	Jann	Bartender	Episode: "Road Trippin'"
2020	Unlocking Christmas	Jackson	Television film
2021	Nurses	Joel	Episode: "Code Orange"
2021–2022	Overlord and the Underwoods	Jim Underwood	20 episodes
2022	True Dating Stories	Bob the Pilot	Episode: "Allie"
2022	Fit for Christmas	Jim	CBS Original Film
2024	Twas the Date Before Christmas	Keegan	
2024	Operation Nutcracker	Dave	Television film
