= Susan Shanks =

Canadian film editor

Susan Shanks is a Canadian film editor. She is most noted for her work on the documentary film Ghosts of Afghanistan, for which she won the Canadian Screen Award for Best Editing in a Documentary Program or Series at the 10th Canadian Screen Awards in 2022.

She has also been a two-time Genie Award nominee for Best Editing, receiving nods at the 18th Genie Awards in 1997 for The Hanging Garden and at the 20th Genie Awards in 2000 for Beefcake.

Her other credits have included the films Bravery in the Field, Ups and Downs, The Bay Boy, 3 Needles, Steel Toes and The Gospel According to the Blues.
