= Kathleen Newman-Bremang =

Canadian writer and broadcaster

Kathleen Newman-Bremang is a Canadian writer and broadcaster, most noted as a journalist and editor for Refinery29 and as a guest commentator on the CBC Radio One arts and culture magazine show Q.

She has also worked as a television producer for The Social, eTalk and the MuchMusic Video Awards.

In 2021, she appeared on CBC Music's inaugural Canada Listens debates, advocating for Kardinal Offishall's album Quest for Fire: Firestarter, Vol. 1. The album won the competition.

In 2022, she received a Canadian Screen Award nomination for Best Host in a Web Program or Series at the 10th Canadian Screen Awards, as cohost with Elaine Lui of the livestreamed Toronto Film Critics Association Awards 2020 presentation. Newman-Bremang was also named as one of three winners, alongside Amanda Parris and Kayla Grey, of the Academy of Canadian Cinema and Television's inaugural Changemaker Award.
