= Echo Generation =

2021 video game

- Developer: Cococucumber
- Publisher: Cococucumber
- Composer: Pusher
- Engine: Unity
- Platforms: Windows; Xbox One; Xbox Series X and Series S; Nintendo Switch
- Release: Xbox One, Xbox Series X/S, Windows; October 21, 2021; Nintendo Switch, Steam; June 19, 2024
- Genres: Role-playing, adventure
- Mode: Single-player

Echo Generation is a 2021 role-playing adventure game developed and published by Canadian independent studio Cococucumber. Set in 1993, it follows a group of children investigating supernatural events surrounding their hometown. Its gameplay combines exploration and item-based puzzles with turn-based battles in which the effectiveness of attacks and defensive actions depends on timed inputs.

The game was released for Windows, Xbox One, and Xbox Series X and Series S on October 21, 2021. An enhanced version, titled Echo Generation: Midnight Edition, was released for Windows through Steam and the Nintendo Switch in June 2024. The original release received generally favorable reviews, with critics praising its voxel-based presentation, atmosphere, soundtrack and combat, while criticizing its backtracking, unclear progression and requirement for repeated battles. A sequel, Echo Generation 2, was released in 2026.

== Gameplay ==
Echo Generation is a single-player role-playing adventure game. The player explores the fictional town of Maple Town and its surrounding areas, speaks with residents and collects items needed to complete quests, solve environmental puzzles and open new locations. Progression frequently involves exchanging an item with one character to obtain another object needed elsewhere. Comic books found while exploring unlock new attacks and abilities for members of the player's party.

The player's party ordinarily consists of the customizable protagonist, their younger sister and one animal companion. Additional companions can be recruited throughout the game. Battles are turn-based, but attacks, special abilities and defensive actions incorporate timed button presses or short minigames. These include pressing a button when a meter reaches a specified point, entering a sequence of inputs, repeatedly pressing a button or completing a rhythm-based action. Performing these successfully increases damage or reduces the effects of an enemy attack.

Defeating enemies awards experience points. Upon gaining a level, the player can increase a character's health, physical strength or skill points, which are consumed when using special abilities. Newly recruited animal companions begin at a low level and must participate in battles to gain experience.

The Midnight Edition added fast travel, a quest tracker, adjustable camera controls, revised combat balancing and improved graphics.

== Development and release ==
Cococucumber began developing ideas for Echo Generation in 2018. According to the studio's co-founder, producer and art director Vanessa Chia, the developers wanted to combine nostalgia for childhood in a small town with a style of active turn-based gameplay inspired by earlier games in the Paper Mario series.

The game continued the voxel-based visual style that Cococucumber had used for its earlier game Riverbond. The developers sought to retain a block-like appearance while introducing more detailed models and smoother animation. Organic creatures that were difficult to represent entirely through voxels were modelled in Maya and given pixel-based textures. The game was developed using the Unity engine and C#, while its assets were created with Qubicle, Photoshop and Maya. Its electronic and synthwave-influenced soundtrack was composed by Pusher.

Production was supported by investments and grants from the Canada Media Fund and Ontario Creates. Cococucumber partnered with Microsoft through its ID@Xbox program for the game's original console release, which launched through Xbox Game Pass on its release date. The game was announced during the Xbox Games Showcase in July 2020.

It was released for Xbox One, Xbox Series X/S and Windows through the Microsoft Store on October 21, 2021.

Cococucumber subsequently developed the enhanced Midnight Edition, which was released for Nintendo Switch and Windows through Steam on June 19, 2024. The sequel, Echo Generation 2 was released on May 27, 2026, for Xbox Series X/S, Xbox One and Windows, and was made available through Game Pass.

== Plot ==
In 1993, the teenaged player character lives with their mother and younger sister Lily in Maple Town. While preparing to make a horror film with their friends, the siblings hear reports that an unidentified spacecraft has crashed in a nearby cornfield. At the crash site, they discover evidence connected to their father Jack, who disappeared several years earlier after taking a job with FST, a secretive military research company operating outside the town.

The siblings investigate FST and the increasingly unusual events occurring throughout Maple Town. They encounter mutated wildlife, hostile machines, extraterrestrials and supernatural creatures, while recruiting several local animals to accompany them. With most of the town's adults unaware of the threat, the children attempt to determine what happened to their father and uncover the connection between FST, the crashed spacecraft and the creatures appearing around the town.

== Reception ==
Reception

Aggregate scores
Aggregator	Score
Metacritic	75/100 (XSX); 70/100 (NS)
OpenCritic	63%

Review scores
Publication	Score
Hardcore Gamer	3.5/5
Nintendo Life	7/10 (NS)
Nintendo World Report	8/10 (NS)
Shacknews	7/10
PureXbox	8/10
Windows Central	4/5

According to review aggregator Metacritic, the Xbox Series X/S version of Echo Generation received "generally favorable" reviews, with a weighted average score of 75 out of 100 based on 14 reviews. The Nintendo Switch version of the Midnight Edition received "mixed or average" reviews, with a score of 70 out of 100 based on four reviews. OpenCritic reported a top-critic average of 77 out of 100, with 63% of critics recommending the game.

The game's visual presentation, atmosphere and soundtrack were frequently praised. TJ Denzer of Shacknews commended the variety of its narrative, voxel environments, music and turn-based combat, but found its progression excessively reliant on grinding and obscure solutions. Alexander Cope of Windows Central similarly praised the detailed voxel graphics, timing-based battles and boss encounters. He criticized the lack of fast travel in the original version, the unintuitive solutions to some puzzles and the difficulty of bringing newly recruited companions up to the party's level.

Randy Kalista of Gaming Nexus praised the convergence of the game's music, art direction and coming-of-age atmosphere, but argued that these qualities were undermined by its fetch-quest structure and lack of clear guidance. Denzer also considered the game's ending overly compressed, although he found the journey and range of environments more successful than its conclusion.

Reviewing the Midnight Edition, Ken Talbot of Nintendo Life praised its visual and sound design, writing and variety of enemies, but considered its role-playing and adventure mechanics poorly integrated. He also criticized its repetitive backtracking, progression and difficulty spikes. Allyson Cygan of Nintendo World Report responded more positively to its atmosphere, action-command combat and exploration, while finding its supporting characters and their connection to the story underdeveloped.
