= Parastoo Anoushahpour =

Iranian-Canadian moving image artist

- Born: 1986 (age 39–40); Tehran, Iran
- Education: BA in Design for Performance from University of the Arts London, Central Saint Martin’s College of Art and Design, London, UK, a diploma from Architectural Association School of Architecture, London, UK, a MFA in Interdisciplinary Art, Media & Design from the Ontario College of Art & Design, Toronto, Canada.
- Known for: Artist
- Website: https://www.parastooanoushahpour.com/

Parastoo Anoushahpour is an Iranian-Canadian moving image artist based in Toronto. She works primarily with video, film and installation. Anoushahpour has worked as part of an artist collective since 2013 with Faraz Anoushahpour and Ryan Ferko.

Anoushahpour’s artist residencies include the Mohammad and Mahera Abu Ghazaleh Foundation in Jordan, Tabakalera International Centre for Contemporary Culture in Spain, Taipei Artist Village in Taiwan, ZK/U Center for Art and Urbanistics in Germany and the Banff Centre for Arts & Creativity in Canada.

== Select works ==
=== The Time That Separate Us (2022) ===
The Time that Separates Us depicts the story of Lot's wife through the contemporary Jordan River Valley.

=== Charity (2021) ===
Created by the artist collective of Parastoo Anoushahpour, Faraz Anoushahpour and Ryan Ferko, Charity is an interactive documentary that examines a controversy surrounding public art in Markham, Ontario. Charity uses 360° video and photogrammetry to re-tell the community’s "confrontation with a piece of public art".

=== The Lighthouse (2014) ===
In Anoushahpour's piece The Lighthouse, two photographs are reproduced as slides and converted into a three-dimensional installation, using a rotating screen and two slide projectors. The images depict a path to a 12th century lighthouse in Dover, UK.

== Select Awards ==
A select list of awards and grants that Parastoo Anoushahpour has been the recipient of:

- Ontario Arts Council (2019).
- Honorary Mention, Chooka, Media City Film Festival (2018).
- Chalmers Arts Fellowship (2018).
- Emerging Media Artist Grant, Toronto Arts Council (2018).
