= Your Two Cents =

Canadian non-fiction web series hosted by Jonathan Torrens

Your Two Cents is a Canadian non-fiction web series, premiered in 2019. Hosted by Jonathan Torrens and essentially a revival of his earlier CBC Television series Street Cents, the series blends information and humour segments to educate teens and young adults on financial literacy and consumer awareness topics.

The series is sponsored by Credit Unions of Atlantic Canada.

Torrens received Canadian Screen Award nominations for Best Direction in a Web Program or Series at the 8th Canadian Screen Awards in 2020, and Best Writing in a Web Program or Series at the 9th Canadian Screen Awards in 2021.
