= TallBoyz =

Canadian comedy television series

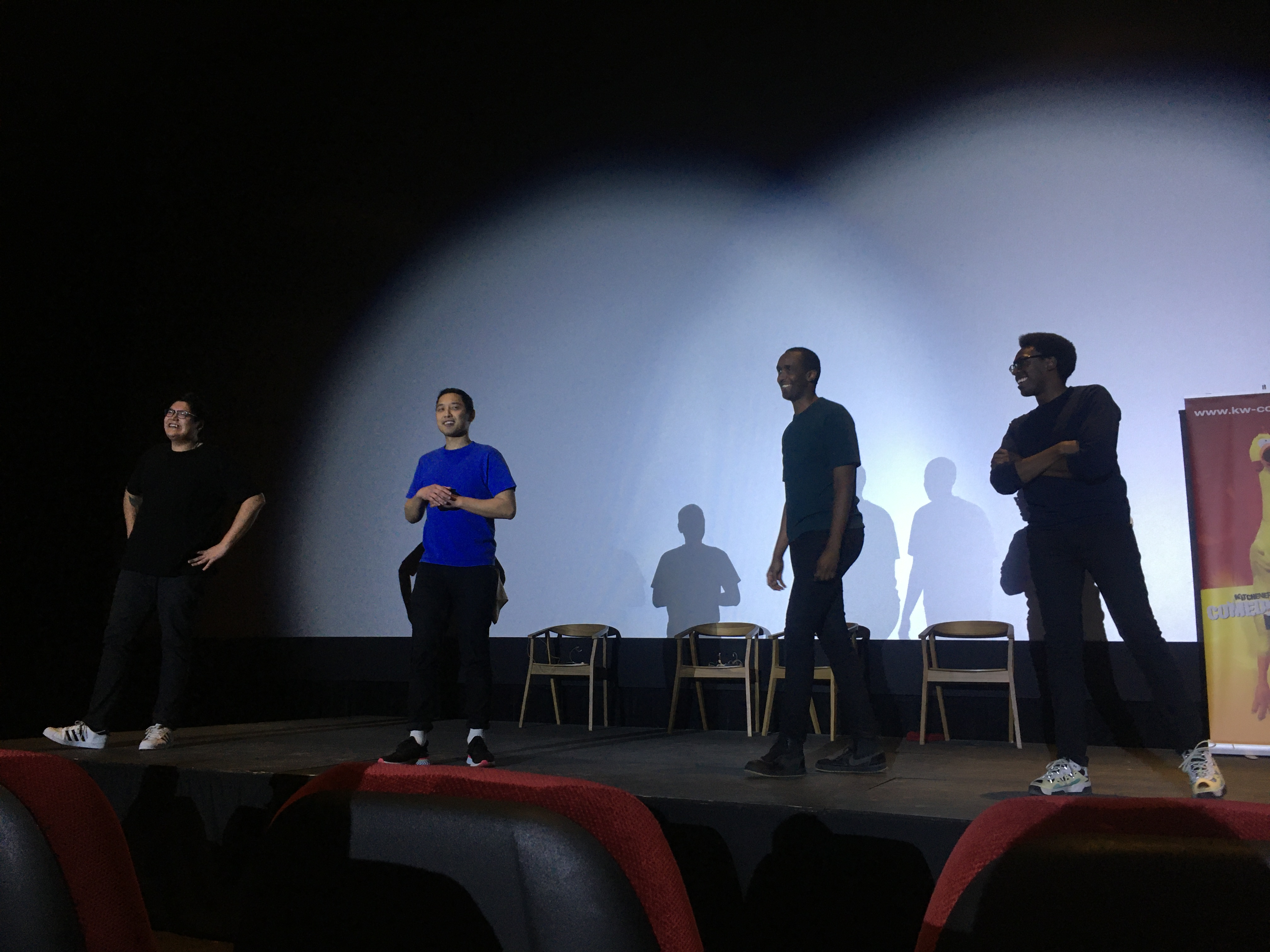
TallBoyz performing a live show at Apollo Cinema in Kitchener, Ontario in February 2020.

TallBoyz is a Canadian television sketch comedy troupe best known for their 2019–2022 CBC Television sketch comedy series. The troupe members are Guled Abdi, Vance Banzo, Tim Blair and Franco Nguyen, who have worked for several years in stage-based sketch comedy under the name TallBoyz II Men.

They were best known for their stage show A 6ix NNNNNN Revue, which won the award for Best Comedy at the 2018 Toronto Fringe Festival. The title of A 6ix NNNNNN Revue was an allusion to the Toronto alternative weekly newspaper Now, whose music, film, literature and theatre critics rate works on a scale of one to five N's instead of stars.

== Television series ==
The group's television series is produced by Bruce McCulloch and Susan Cavan, and was developed after McCulloch saw the troupe perform at the Toronto Sketch Comedy Festival in 2018.

In March 2022, the series began airing in the U.S on Fuse.

Tallboyz is the winner of four Canadian Screen Awards (CSAs) including Best Sketch Comedy Program or Series.

=== Season 1 ===
No. overall	No. in season	Title	Directed by	Written by	Original release date
1	1	"What's it Gonna Be, Boys?"	Unknown	Unknown	September 17, 2019
2	2	"Clap Your Hands, Everybody"	Unknown	Unknown	September 24, 2019
3	3	"Mind the Mints"	Unknown	Unknown	October 1, 2019
4	4	"Suck it Up and Go to Mars"	Unknown	Unknown	October 8, 2019
5	5	"Wow, Are These Insoles?"	Unknown	Unknown	October 15, 2019
6	6	"Under Caricature Clouds"	Unknown	Unknown	October 22, 2019
7	7	"Hoop Hoop Hooray!"	Unknown	Unknown	October 29, 2019
8	8	"Fare is Fair"	Unknown	Unknown	November 5, 2019

=== Season 2 ===
No. overall	No. in season	Title	Directed by	Written by	Original release date
9	1	"You're the Dads Now!"	Unknown	Unknown	February 16, 2021
10	2	"Refreshingly Not Racist"	Unknown	Unknown	February 23, 2021
11	3	"Poetry in Falsetto"	Unknown	Unknown	March 2, 2021
12	4	"Why is He Blowing Me Kisses?"	Unknown	Unknown	March 9, 2021
13	5	"Leave the Duckies and Go"	Unknown	Unknown	March 16, 2021
14	6	"All the Focus is on the Diamonds"	Unknown	Unknown	March 23, 2021
15	7	"I Rank Velvet #1"	Unknown	Unknown	March 30, 2021
16	8	"Who's Guarding the Angel?"	Unknown	Unknown	April 6, 2021

=== Season 3 ===
No. overall	No. in season	Title	Directed by	Written by	Original release date
17	1	"Don't Swear in Front of the Song"	Unknown	Unknown	January 25, 2022
18	2	"I Don't Trust the Cloud"	Unknown	Unknown	February 1, 2022
19	3	"It's Hard Being Precocious"	Unknown	Unknown	February 22, 2022
20	4	"Jesus Was a Homeless Baby Too"	Unknown	Unknown	March 1, 2022
21	5	"You Always Pick Scissors"	Unknown	Unknown	March 8, 2022
22	6	"Can You Keep Your Wishing Down?"	Unknown	Unknown	March 15, 2022
23	7	"I've Got This Foot Thing"	Unknown	Unknown	March 22, 2022
24	8	"Papa You Are My Dad"	Unknown	Unknown	March 29, 2022
