= Graeme Smith (journalist) =

Canadian author and researcher (born 1979)

- Born: June 3, 1979 (age 47)
- Occupations: Author, Researcher
- Writing career
- Notable works: The Dogs Are Eating Them Now: Our War in Afghanistan, Talking to the Taliban, Afghanistan's Insurgency After the Transition

Graeme Smith (born June 3, 1979) is a Canadian author and researcher. He worked as a political affairs officer for the United Nations in Afghanistan from 2015 to 2018. He was previously a senior analyst for the International Crisis Group. He has served as a foreign correspondent for The Globe and Mail, a Canadian newspaper.

== Career ==
Smith was hired by The Globe and Mail as a staff reporter in 2001. The newspaper appointed him as bureau chief in Winnipeg (2003), Moscow (2005), Kandahar (2006), Delhi (2010), and Istanbul (2011).

Smith investigated detainees captured by Canadian troops and transferred into Afghan custody in 2007, revealing widespread torture in local jails. This became known as the Canadian Afghan detainee issue. Two weeks later, Ottawa signed a new bilateral agreement with Kabul to protect prisoners. Smith and his colleague Paul Koring won the Michener Award for public service, granted once a year by the Governor General of Canada.

His 2008 multimedia series "Talking to the Taliban" gave viewers the opportunity to watch 42 Taliban insurgents discuss why they fight, and made public the raw video along with articles and short documentaries. The project won several prizes - including an Emmy Award.

During his coverage of the 2011 civil war in Libya, Smith found documents that showed the Chinese government offered large arsenals of weapons to Muammar Gaddafi, in violation of UN sanctions. China apologized.

Other documents Smith discovered in Libya contributed to the scandal over engineering giant SNC-Lavalin's role in the country, and the coverage won three magazine awards. A Royal Canadian Mounted Police investigation resulted in corruption and fraud charges against the company marking an important test of Canada's Corruption of Foreign Public Officials Act. Senior executives were convicted and the company pleaded guilty to fraud. This episode became part of a broader issue known as the SNC-Lavalin affair.

His bestselling book, The Dogs Are Eating Them Now: Our War In Afghanistan, published in 2013 by Knopf/Random House Canada, described the war in southern Afghanistan from 2005 to 2011. The book was nominated for four literary awards and won the Hilary Weston Writers' Trust Prize for Nonfiction, Canada's richest prize for non-fiction. An updated U.S. edition was published in 2014, along with a French translation in 2015.

In 2012, he joined the International Crisis Group as head of the organization's office in Afghanistan. He writes research papers about politics and security, and contributes op-ed articles to publications such as The New York Times, Reuters, and other media outlets.

== Selected awards ==
- 2014 Shaughnessy Cohen Prize for political writing (short-listed)
- 2014 RBC Taylor Prize for non-fiction (short-listed)
- 2014 British Columbia National Award for Canadian non-fiction (short-listed)
- 2013 Hilary Weston Writers' Trust Prize for Nonfiction (winner)
- 2013 National Magazine Award for investigative reporting (gold)
- 2013 National Magazine Award for business reporting (gold)
- 2013 National Magazine Award for politics and public interest (silver)
- 2012 National Newspaper Award for international reporting (nominee)
- 2009 Emmy Award for new approaches to news and documentary
- 2008 National Newspaper Award for international reporting
- 2008 National Newspaper Award for multimedia project
- 2007 Michener Award for public-service journalism
- 2007 National Newspaper Award for international reporting
- 2007 Amnesty International award for Canadian print journalism
- 2002 Edward Goff Penny prize for young Canadian journalists
- 1999 Canadian Association of Journalists award for investigations

== Selected bibliography ==
- Decoding the New Taliban (Hurst, 2009), book chapter
- The Rule of Law in Afghanistan: Missing in Inaction (Cambridge University Press, 2010), book chapter
- The Dogs Are Eating Them Now: Our War In Afghanistan (Knopf, 2013)
- Afghanistan's Insurgency After The Transition (International Crisis Group, 2014)
