= 2018 in Canadian television =

The following is a list of events affecting Canadian television in 2018. Events listed include television show debuts, finales, cancellations, and channel launches, closures and rebrandings.

== Events ==
=== Notable events ===
==== January ====
Date	Event
3	CBC Television broadcasts Tower of Song: A Memorial Tribute to Leonard Cohen, a tribute concert to Canadian musician Leonard Cohen which took place in November 2017.
23	Bell Media announces a branding and content agreement with the American television channel Starz, which will see The Movie Network Encore rebrand as a Canadian Starz channel.

==== March ====
Date	Event
TBA	Vassy Kapelos, formerly the host of Global's political news series The West Block, moves to CBC News Network as the host of Power & Politics.
11	The 6th Canadian Screen Awards air on CBC.
31	Viceland ceases television distribution, after majority owner Rogers Media drops out of the venture. Branding partner Vice Media will take over the channel's Canadian assets, which will be used to produce content for the main vice.com Web site.

==== April ====
Date	Event
11	After emerging from creditor protection, Canadian pay television multiplex provider Super Channel announces the rebranding of its channels as Super Channel Fuse and Super Channel Heart & Home.

==== June ====
Date	Event
7	Bell Media announces its intent to launch free VOD services CTV Vault and CTV Movies on the CTV app and website in the Fall, as well as the intent to rebrand The Comedy Network, Space, the original Bravo, and Gusto, respectively, as CTV Comedy, CTV Sci-Fi, CTV Drama, and CTV Life, to align them with the branding of the CTV Television Network.

==== August ====
Date	Event
27	Corus Entertainment's three stations in Southeastern Ontario, CKWS-DT in Kingston, CHEX-DT in Peterborough, and CHEX-TV-2 in Oshawa, end their program supply agreement with the CTV Television Network after 3 years and become full-time owned-and-operated stations of the Corus-owned Global Television Network. (The three stations, which had been three of the CBC's last private affiliates prior to 2015, had been airing Global's nightly newscast Global National and local variations of its Morning Show since September 2016, following Corus' acquisition of Global's former parent company Shaw Media in April 2016.)

==== November ====
Date	Event
1	Bell Media rebrands the pay TV service The Movie Network as Crave, aligning it with the branding of its television streaming service Crave.

==== December ====
Date	Event
31	After 17 years, Knowledge Network officially signs BBC Kids off the air.

== Television programs ==
=== Programs debuting in 2018 ===
Series currently listed here have been announced by their respective networks as scheduled to premiere in 2018. Note that shows may be delayed or cancelled by the network between now and their scheduled air dates.

Start date	Show	Channel	Source
January 10	Burden of Truth	CBC	
January 10	The Launch	CTV	
January 14	The Weekly with Wendy Mesley	CBC	
February 2	Crawford	CBC	
February 13	Skindigenous	APTN	
February 15 (digital)	This Blows	CBC	
February 26	Caught	CBC	
March 1	Little Dog	CBC	
March 25	The Detail	CTV	
April 2	Corner Gas Animated	The Comedy Network	
May 12	Anaana's Tent	APTN	
May 15	Carter	Bravo (original)	
May 17	Where to I Do?	Gusto	
June 4	ReBoot: The Guardian Code	YTV	
September 10	Discussions avec mes parents	Ici Radio-Canada Télé	
September 11	First Contact	APTN	
September 21	In the Making	CBC	
November 13	Future History	APTN	
November 15	From the Vaults	CBC	
Unknown date	Miss Persona	YouTube, Treehouse TV	

=== Programs ending in 2018 ===
Start date	Show	Channel	Source
January 30	Hard Rock Medical	TVOntario	

=== Television films ===
Start date	Show	Channel	Source
September 30	Believe Me: The Abduction of Lisa McVey	Showcase	
October 21	Etthén Heldeli: Caribou Eaters	Citytv	

== Deaths ==
Date	Name	Age	Notability	Source
January 8	Donnelly Rhodes	80	Character actor best known for appearances in Soap, Battlestar Galactica, and Da Vinci's Inquest.	
January 26	Jacques Languirand	86	Radio host, writer and actor (Le Colombier, Le Rebut Global).	
January 29	Jay Switzer	61	Television executive for Citytv.	
January 31	Alf Humphreys	64	Actor (The X Files, The Twilight Zone (the 1985 and 2002 revivals), Smallville, Outer Limits and Da Vinci's Inquest).	
January 31	Leah LaBelle	31	Canadian-born singer who competed on Season 3 of American Idol.	
February 5	Manfred Joehnck	64	News anchor for CTV News Regina.	
February 10	Tina Louise Bomberry	52	Mohawk actress best known for her role as Rosie Deela in North of 60 and its three follow-up films.	
May 13	Margot Kidder	69	Canadian-born actress who was active in Canadian television from the late 1960s through the mid-1970s	
November 11	Wayne Maunder	80	Canadian-born actor (Custer, Lancer, Chase)	

== Television stations ==
=== Network launches ===
Network	Type	Launch date	Notes
Natyf TV	Cable	June 14	French language multicultural channel

=== Network affiliation changes ===
Date	Market	Station	Channel	Previous affiliation	New affiliation	Notes/References
August 27	Kingston, Ontario	CKWS-DT	11.1	CTV	Global	
August 27	Oshawa, Ontario	CHEX-TV-2	22 (analog)	CTV	Global	
August 27	Peterborough, Ontario	CHEX-DT	12.1	CTV	Global	

=== Network conversions and rebrandings ===
Old network name	New network name	Type	Conversion date	Notes
The Movie Network	Crave		November 1	

=== Network closures ===
Network	Type	Closure date	Notes
Sundance Channel		March 1	
Viceland		March 31	
BBC Kids		December 31	

== See also ==
- 2018 in Canada
- List of Canadian films of 2018
