= 2019 in Canadian television =

The following is a list of events affecting Canadian television in 2019. Events listed include television show debuts, finales, cancellations, and channel launches, closures and rebrandings.

== Events ==
Date	Event	Source
March 1	Bell Media rebrands The Movie Network Encore as Starz.	
March 9	Much discontinues the daytime Playlist block of music videos, citing decreased viewership and interest. It was replaced by repeats of Comedy Now! and Just for Laughs: Gags during the morning hours. The Much Retro Lunch block remained the only regularly-scheduled music-video programming on the channel, until its discontinuation in March 2020.	
April 1	Action was replaced by a full-time Canadian version of Adult Swim, which replaced both the original Adult Swim programming block and Teletoon at Night, which closed on March 4 and April 1, respectively.	
April 10	Quebecor removes the TVA Sports channels from Bell Satellite TV and Bell Fibe TV due to a carriage dispute despite being warned not to do so by the CRTC. An injunction by the Quebec Superior Court forces Quebecor to restore access to the channels two days later.	
June 13	Game 6 of the 2019 NBA Finals, in which the Toronto Raptors won their first-ever NBA championship title, is watched by an overall audience of 7.7 million Canadians across all television channels that were broadcasting the game in Canada. An estimated 15.9 million viewers are estimated to have watched at least some portion of the game, with 9.9 million viewers watching the final minute.	
July 19	Nelvana Limited, the Toronto-based television production and distribution arm of Corus Entertainment, files a copyright infringement lawsuit in the United States District Court for the Eastern District of Oklahoma, alleging that Tulsa, Oklahoma-based Treehouse Dispensary "wilfully copied and is using a confusing similar imitation" of the logo it has used since the November 1, 1997 launch of its children's specialty channel, Treehouse (which has been registered with the United States Patent and Trademark Office for its Treehouse Direct VOD service since November 2007). Nelvana stated that the statewide medical marijuana dispensary chain promised to stop using the logo, but did not provide a timeline nor did it follow through in a timely manner on its agreement to change the logo (although it had commissioned a new logo released on its social media accounts in May). Nelvana is seeking a declaratory judgment affirming that the trademarked logo was infringed upon and engaged in unfair competition and false advertising, financial damages (including any profits the dispensaries made while using and promoting the logo) and the seizure, delivery and destruction of any cannabis or cannabis-derived products that violate its trademark.	
August 27	Vidéotron launches the Helix IPTV service, using the Xfinity X1 platform.	
September 12	Bell Media rebrands The Comedy Network, Space, the original Bravo and Gusto, respectively as CTV Comedy Channel, CTV Sci-Fi Channel, CTV Drama Channel and CTV Life Channel, aligning them with the branding of the CTV Television Network.	
November 9	After 39 years, Don Cherry appears for the last time on Hockey Night in Canada, and is later fired from Sportsnet on November 11, after receiving backlash from viewers and social media when he singled out Toronto-area immigrants for not wearing poppies during a tribute to Canada's war veterans during his Coach's Corner segment. The actions are also condemned by the NHL, Hockey Canada, sponsor Labatt (the licensee for Budweiser), and the CBC (which co-produces the program in conjunction with Sportsnet under a deal that runs through 2026).	

== Television programs ==
=== Programs debuting in 2019 ===
Series currently listed here have been announced by their respective networks as scheduled to premiere in 2019. Note that shows may be delayed or cancelled by the network between now and their scheduled air dates.

Start date	Show	Channel	Source
January	Holly Hobbie	Family Channel	
January 7	Coroner	CBC	
January 9	Unspeakable	CBC	
January 10	Cavendish	CBC	
February 25	Passe-Partout	Télé-Québec	
March 1	Northern Rescue	CBC	
March 4	Street Legal	CBC	
March 6	Diggstown	CBC	
March 15	Under New Management	CBC	
March 20	Jann	CTV	
March 25	Hudson & Rex	Citytv	
March 25	The Murders	Citytv	
April 19	History Erased	History	
April 28	Mary's Kitchen Crush	CTV	
May 2	The 410	CBC Gem	
May 24	Big Food Bucket List	Food Network	
June 17	Fak Yaass	OutTV	
July 15	Molly of Denali	CBC	
September 7	Agent Binky: Pets of the Universe	Treehouse TV	
September 17	TallBoyz	CBC	
December 16	Family Feud Canada	CBC	
December 31	New Eden	Crave	
TBA	Big Blue	CBC	
TBA	Departure	Global	
TBA	Kingdom Force	CBC	
Unconfirmed date	Pride	OutTV	

=== Programs ending in 2019 ===
End date	Show	Channel	Source
September 20	Killjoys	CTV Sci-Fi Channel	
November 24	Anne with an E	CBC	

=== Television films ===
Date	Film	Channel	Source
March 22	To the Worlds	CBC	
March 22	Village of the Missing	CBC	
August 2	Daughter of the Wolf		
September	Claws of the Red Dragon	NTD Canada	
October 13	La Bohème	CBC Gem	
November 22	The Sanctuary	Hollywood Suite	
Unknown date	Christmas Jars	Citytv	

== Networks and services ==
=== Network conversions and rebrandings ===
Old network name	New network name	Type	Conversion date	Notes
TMN Encore	Starz	Cable/satellite	March 1	
Action	Adult Swim (channel)	Cable/satellite	April 1	
The Comedy Network	CTV Comedy Channel	Cable/satellite	September 12	
Space	CTV Sci-Fi Channel	Cable/satellite	September 12	
Bravo (original)	CTV Drama Channel	Cable/satellite	September 12	Original channel name and branding by Bell Media; a new Bravo channel from Rogers Sports & Media launched on September 1, 2024 under license from NBCUniversal, using the former channel allotments and license of OLN.
Gusto	CTV Life Channel	Cable/satellite	September 12	

=== Network closures ===
Network	Type	Closure date	Notes
Adult Swim (original programming block)		March 4	
Teletoon at Night		April 1	
Comedy Gold		September 1	
IFC		September 30	
Cosmopolitan TV		September 30	
fyi		December 31	

== See also ==
- 2019 in Canada
- List of Canadian films of 2019
- List of most watched Canadian television broadcasts of 2019
