= List of awards and nominations received by Schitt's Creek =

Awards and nominations received by Schitt's Creek
Awards and nominations
Award	Wins	Nominations
ACTRA Toronto Awards	3	5
American Cinema Editors Eddie Awards	0	1
Canadian Alliance of Film & Television Costume Arts & Design (CAFTCAD) Awards	1	1
Canadian Cinema Editors	0	3
Canadian Comedy Awards	1	2
Canadian Screen Awards	24	80
Costume Designers Guild Awards	1	1
Critics' Choice Television Award	2	11
Directors Guild of Canada Awards	5	9
Dorian Awards	2	9
Dorian TV Awards	6	8
GLAAD Media Awards	1	3
Golden Globe Awards	2	5
Golden Maple Awards	1	2
Gracie Awards	1	1
Make-Up Artists and Hair Stylists Guild Awards	1	2
MTV Movie & TV Awards	1	3
People's Choice Awards	0	5
Primetime Emmy Awards	9	19
Producers Guild of America Awards	1	2
Satellite Awards	2	5
Screen Actors Guild Awards	2	7
Shorty Awards	1	1
TCA Awards	2	5
The Queerties	1	2
Webby Awards	2	2
WGC Screenwriting Awards	2	4

Totals (Note: Certain award groups do not simply award one winner. They acknowledge several different recipients, have runners-up, and have third place. Since this is a specific recognition and is different from losing an award, runner-up mentions are considered wins in this award tally. For simplification and to avoid errors, each award in this list has been presumed to have had a prior nomination.)
- Wins: 65
- Nominations: 178

Schitt's Creek (stylized as Schitt^{$} Creek) is a Canadian television sitcom. The series stars Eugene Levy and Catherine O'Hara as Johnny and Moira Rose, a wealthy couple who are forced, after losing all their money, to rebuild their lives in their only remaining asset: the small town of Schitt's Creek, which they once purchased as a joke, where they are living with their two adult children in two adjacent rooms of a rundown motel.

== Total awards and nominations for the cast ==
Actor	Nominations	Awards
Daniel Levy	32	13
Eugene Levy	20	7
Catherine O'Hara	19	11
Annie Murphy	12	4
Emily Hampshire	10	7
Noah Reid	7	2
Jennifer Robertson	7	1
Chris Elliott	6	2
Dustin Milligan	2	0
John Hemphill	1	0
Sarah Levy	1	0
Karen Robinson	1	0

== ACTRA Award in Toronto ==
Year	Category	Nominee	Result	Ref
2016	Outstanding Performance – Female	Catherine O'Hara	Won	
2017	Members' Choice Series Ensemble	Schitt's Creek	Nominated	
2018	Members' Choice Series Ensemble	Schitt's Creek	Nominated	
2019	Members' Choice Series Ensemble	Schitt's Creek	Won	
2020	Members' Choice Series Ensemble	Schitt's Creek	Won	
2021	Members' Choice Series Ensemble	Schitt's Creek	Won	

== American Cinema Editors (ACE) Eddie Awards ==
Year	Category	Nominee	Result	Ref
2020	Best Edited Comedy Series for Commercial Television	Trevor Ambrose (for "Life Is a Cabaret")	Nominated	
2021	Best Edited Comedy Series for Commercial Television	Trevor Ambrose (for "Happy Ending")	Won	

== Australian Academy of Cinema Television Arts (AACTA) International Awards ==
Year	Category	Nominee	Result	Ref
2021	Best Comedy Series	Schitt's Creek	Won	
2021	Best Actor in a Series	Daniel Levy	Nominated	
2021	Best Actress in a Series	Catherine O'Hara	Nominated	

== Canadian Alliance of Film & Television Costume Arts & Design (CAFTCAD) Awards ==
Year	Category	Nominee	Result	Ref
2019	Excellence in Costume Design in TV: Contemporary	Debra Hanson, Darci Cheyne, Peter Webster, Frances Cabezas Miller and Amanda Woods (for "RIP Moira Rose")	Won	

== Canadian Cinema Editors ==
Year	Category	Nominee	Result	Ref
2015	Best Editing in 1/2 Hour Broadcast Short Form	Trevor Ambrose (for "The Cabin")	Nominated	
2015	Best Editing in 1/2 Hour Broadcast Short Form	James Bredin (for "Don't Worry, It's His Sister")	Nominated	
2018	Best Editing in 1/2 Hour Broadcast Short Form	Trevor Ambrose (for "Singles Week")	Nominated	

== Canadian Comedy Awards ==
Year	Category	Nominee	Result	Ref
2016	Best TV Show	Schitt's Creek	Nominated	
2018	Multimedia/Comedic Artist of the Year	Catherine O' Hara	Won	

== Canadian Screen Awards ==
Year	Category	Nominee	Result	Ref
2016	Best Comedy Series	Eugene Levy, Daniel Levy, Andrew Barnsley, Fred Levy, Ben Feigin, Mike Short, Kevin White and Colin Brunton	Won	
2016	Best Performance by an Actor in a Continuing Leading Comedic Role	Daniel Levy (for "The Cabin")	Nominated	
2016	Best Performance by an Actor in a Continuing Leading Comedic Role	Eugene Levy (for "Carl's Funeral")	Won	
2016	Best Performance by an Actress in a Continuing Leading Comedic Role	Annie Murphy (for "The Cabin")	Nominated	
2016	Best Performance by an Actress in a Continuing Leading Comedic Role	Catherine O'Hara (for "Don't Worry, It's His Sister")	Won	
2016	Best Performance by an Actor in a Featured Supporting Role or Guest Role in a Comedic Series	Chris Elliott (for "Honeymoon" and "Surprise Party")	Won	
2016	Best Performance by an Actress in a Featured Supporting Role or Guest Role in a Comedic Series	Emily Hampshire (for "Our Cup Runneth Over" and "Carl's Funeral")	Won	
2016	Best Performance by an Actress in a Featured Supporting Role or Guest Role in a Comedic Series	Jennifer Robertson (for "Turkey Shoot" and "Honeymoon")	Nominated	
2016	Best Direction in a Comedy Program	Jerry Ciccoritti (for "Our Cup Runneth Over")	Nominated	
2016	Best Direction in a Comedy Program	Paul Fox (for "The Cabin")	Won	
2016	Best Writing in a Comedy Program or Series	Daniel Levy (for "Honeymoon")	Won	
2016	Best Writing in a Comedy Program or Series	Mike Short (for "Don't Worry, It's His Sister")	Nominated	
2016	Best Picture Editing in a Comedy Program or Series	James Bredin (for "Surprise Party")	Won	
2016	Best Photography in a Comedy Program or Series	Gerald Packer (for "Honeymoon")	Won	
2016	Best Cross-Platform Project, Fiction	Cory Lawrence, Eugene Levy, Daniel Levy, Andrew Barnsley, Fred Levy, Ben Feigin and Colin Brunton (for Schitt's Creek Webisodes)	Nominated	
2017	Best Comedy Series	Eugene Levy, Daniel Levy, Andrew Barnsley, Fred Levy, Kevin White, Mike Short, Colin Brunton and Ben Feigin	Nominated	
2017	Best Performance by an Actor in a Continuing Leading Comedic Role	Daniel Levy	Nominated	
2017	Best Performance by an Actor in a Continuing Leading Comedic Role	Eugene Levy	Nominated	
2017	Best Performance by an Actress in a Continuing Leading Comedic Role	Catherine O'Hara	Won	
2017	Best Performance by an Actor in a Featured Supporting Role or Guest Role in a Comedic Series	John Hemphill (for "Bob's Bagels")	Nominated	
2017	Best Performance by an Actress in a Featured Supporting Role or Guest Role in a Comedic Series	Emily Hampshire (for "Bob's Bagels" and "Moira's Nudes")	Won	
2017	Best Direction in a Comedy Program or Series	Jerry Ciccoritti (for "Moira's Nudes")	Nominated	
2017	Best Direction in a Comedy Program or Series	Paul Fox (for "Happy Anniversary")	Nominated	
2017	Best Achievement in Casting	Lisa Parasyn and Jon Comerford (for "Bob's Bagels")	Nominated	
2017	Best Photography in a Comedy Program or Series	Gerald Packer (for "Finding David")	Nominated	
2017	Best Photography in a Comedy Program or Series	Gerald Packer (for "Happy Anniversary")	Nominated	
2017	Best Picture Editing in a Comedy Program or Series	Trevor Ambrose (for "Happy Anniversary")	Nominated	
2017	Best Picture Editing in a Comedy Program or Series	Trevor Ambrose (for "Moira's Nudes")	Nominated	
2018	Best Lead Actor, Comedy	Daniel Levy	Nominated	
2018	Best Lead Actor, Comedy	Eugene Levy	Nominated	
2018	Best Lead Actress, Comedy	Annie Murphy	Nominated	
2018	Best Lead Actress, Comedy	Catherine O'Hara	Won	
2018	Best Supporting or Guest Actor, Comedy	Noah Reid (for "Grad Night" and "Bad Review")	Nominated	
2018	Best Supporting or Guest Actress, Comedy	Emily Hampshire (for "New Car" and "The Throuple")	Won	
2018	Best Supporting or Guest Actress, Comedy	Jennifer Robertson (for "The Affair" and "General Store")	Nominated	
2018	Best Direction, Comedy	Paul Fox (for "New Car")	Nominated	
2018	Best Direction, Comedy	T. W. Peacocke (for "Grad Night")	Nominated	
2018	Best Writing, Comedy	Daniel Levy (for "Opening Night")	Nominated	
2018	Best Photography, Comedy	Gerald Packer (for "Grad Night")	Won	
2019	Best Comedy Series	Eugene Levy, Daniel Levy, Andrew Barnsley, Fred Levy and Ben Feigin	Won	
2019	Best Lead Actor, Comedy	Daniel Levy	Nominated	
2019	Best Lead Actor, Comedy	Eugene Levy	Nominated	
2019	Best Lead Actress, Comedy	Annie Murphy	Nominated	
2019	Best Lead Actress, Comedy	Catherine O'Hara	Won	
2019	Best Supporting or Guest Actor, Comedy	Chris Elliott (for "RIP Moira Rose" and "Girls' Night")	Nominated	
2019	Best Supporting or Guest Actor, Comedy	Noah Reid (for "Open Mic" and "The Barbecue")	Won	
2019	Best Supporting or Guest Actress, Comedy	Emily Hampshire (for "The Olive Branch" and "The Jazzaguy")	Won	
2019	Best Supporting or Guest Actress, Comedy	Jennifer Robertson (for "Baby Sprinkle" and "Singles Week")	Nominated	
2019	Best Direction, Comedy	Daniel Levy and Andrew Cividino (for "Merry Christmas, Johnny Rose")	Nominated	
2019	Best Direction, Comedy	Sturla Gunnarsson (for "Singles Week")	Nominated	
2019	Best Writing, Comedy	Daniel Levy (for "Singles Week")	Nominated	
2019	Best Achievement in Casting	Lisa Parasyn and Jon Comerford	Nominated	
2019	Best Costume Design	Debra Hanson (for "Merry Christmas, Johnny Rose")	Nominated	
2019	Best Photography, Comedy	Gerald Packer (for "Merry Christmas, Johnny Rose")	Nominated	
2020	Radius Award	Daniel Levy	Awarded	
2020	Best Comedy Series	Eugene Levy, Daniel Levy, Andrew Barnsley, Fred Levy, Ben Feigin, David West Read, Mike Short, Rupinder Gill and Colin Brunton	Won	
2020	Best Lead Actor, Comedy	Daniel Levy	Nominated	
2020	Best Lead Actor, Comedy	Eugene Levy	Won	
2020	Best Lead Actress, Comedy	Annie Murphy	Nominated	
2020	Best Lead Actress, Comedy	Catherine O'Hara	Won	
2020	Best Supporting Actor, Comedy	Chris Elliott	Nominated	
2020	Best Supporting Actor, Comedy	Dustin Milligan	Nominated	
2020	Best Supporting Actor, Comedy	Noah Reid	Nominated	
2020	Best Supporting Actress, Comedy	Emily Hampshire	Won	
2020	Best Supporting Actress, Comedy	Sarah Levy	Nominated	
2020	Best Supporting Actress, Comedy	Jennifer Robertson	Nominated	
2020	Best Direction, Comedy	Jordan Canning (for "Meet the Parents")	Nominated	
2020	Best Direction, Comedy	Daniel Levy and Andrew Cividino (for "Life Is a Cabaret")	Nominated	
2020	Best Direction, Comedy	Laurie Lynd (for "The Crowening")	Nominated	
2020	Best Writing, Comedy	Rupinder Gill (for "The Hospies")	Nominated	
2020	Best Writing, Comedy	Daniel Levy (for "Meet the Parents")	Nominated	
2020	Best Writing, Comedy	Daniel Levy and Rupinder Gill (for "Housewarming")	Nominated	
2020	Best Writing, Comedy	David West Read (for "Love Letters")	Nominated	
2020	Best Achievement in Casting	Lisa Parasyn and Jon Comerford	Won	
2020	Best Achievement in Hair	Annastasia Cucullo and Ana Sorys (for "Life Is a Cabaret")	Won	
2020	Best Costume Design	Debra Hanson (for "Life Is a Cabaret")	Nominated	
2020	Best Photography, Comedy	Gerald Packer (for "Life Is a Cabaret")	Nominated	
2020	Best Picture Editing, Comedy	Trevor Ambrose (for "Life Is a Cabaret")	Nominated	
2020	Best Picture Editing, Comedy	Paul Winestock (for "Meet the Parents")	Nominated	
2020	Best Production Design or Art Direction, Fiction	Brendan Smith (for "Life Is a Cabaret")	Nominated	
2020	Best Sound, Fiction	Kathy Choi, Herwig Gayer, Rob Hegedus, Martin Lee and Jane Tattersall (for "Life Is a Cabaret")	Nominated	
2021	Best Comedy Series	Eugene Levy, Daniel Levy, Andrew Barnsley, Fred Levy, Ben Feigin, David West Read, Kurt Smeaton and Kosta Orfanidis	Won	
2021	Best Lead Actor, Comedy	Daniel Levy	Nominated	
2021	Best Lead Actor, Comedy	Eugene Levy	Nominated	
2021	Best Lead Actress, Comedy	Annie Murphy	Nominated	
2021	Best Lead Actress, Comedy	Catherine O'Hara	Won	
2021	Best Supporting Actress, Comedy	Emily Hampshire	Won	
2021	Best Supporting Actress, Comedy	Jennifer Robertson	Nominated	
2021	Best Supporting Actress, Comedy	Karen Robinson	Nominated	
2021	Best Supporting Actor, Comedy	Chris Elliott	Nominated	
2021	Best Supporting Actor, Comedy	Noah Reid	Nominated	
2021	Best Guest Performance, Comedy	Victor Garber (for "Sunrise, Sunset")	Nominated	
2021	Best Guest Performance, Comedy	Rizwan Manji (for "The Presidential Suite")	Nominated	
2021	Best Direction, Comedy	Jordan Canning (for "Sunrise, Sunset")	Nominated	
2021	Best Direction, Comedy	Daniel Levy and Andrew Cividino (for "Happy Ending")	Won	
2021	Best Writing, Comedy	Daniel Levy (for "Happy Ending")	Won	
2021	Best Picture Editing, Comedy	Paul Winestock (for "Start Spreading the News")	Nominated	
2021	Best Costume Design	Debra Hanson (for "Happy Ending")	Won	
2021	Best Achievement in Casting	Lisa Parasyn and Jon Comerford	Won	
2021	Best Achievement in Hair	Annastasia Cucullo and Ana Sorys	Won	
2021	Best Achievement in Make-Up	Candace Ornstein and Lucky Bromhead (for "Happy Ending")	Nominated	
2021	Best Production Design or Art Direction, Fiction	Brendan Smith and Joe Susin (for "Happy Ending")	Nominated	
2021	Best Biography or Arts Documentary Program or Series	Eugene Levy, Daniel Levy, Amy Segal, Andrew Barnsley, Fred Levy, Sally Catto, Trish Williams, Greig Dymond, Brad Schwartz, Elizabeth Allan-Harrington and Gabrielle Free (for Best Wishes, Warmest Regards: A Schitt's Creek Farewell)	Won	

== Costume Designers Guild Awards ==
Year	Category	Nominee	Result	Ref
2019	Excellence in Contemporary Television	Debra Hanson (for "The Dress")	Won	
2021	Excellence in Contemporary Television	Debra Hanson (for "Happy Ending")	Won	

== Critics' Choice Television Awards ==
Year	Category	Nominee	Result	Ref
2019	Best Comedy Series	Schitt's Creek	Nominated	
2020	Best Comedy Series	Schitt's Creek	Nominated	
2020	Best Actor in a Comedy Series	Eugene Levy	Nominated	
2020	Best Actress in a Comedy Series	Catherine O'Hara	Nominated	
2020	Best Supporting Actor in a Comedy Series	Daniel Levy	Nominated	
2020	Best Supporting Actress in a Comedy Series	Annie Murphy	Nominated	
2021	Best Comedy Series	Schitt's Creek	Nominated	
2021	Best Actor in a Comedy Series	Eugene Levy	Nominated	
2021	Best Actress in a Comedy Series	Catherine O'Hara	Won	
2021	Best Supporting Actor in a Comedy Series	Daniel Levy	Won	
2021	Best Supporting Actress in a Comedy Series	Annie Murphy	Nominated	

== Directors Guild of Canada Awards ==
Year	Category	Nominee	Result	Ref
2015	Television Series – Comedy	Directing team (for "Our Cup Runneth Over")	Won	
2015	Television Series – Comedy	Directing team (for "Surprise Party")	Nominated	
2015	Best Production Design – Television Series	Brendan Smith	Won	
2016	Outstanding Directorial Achievement in Comedy Series	Directing team (for "Moira's Nudes")	Won	
2016	Outstanding Directorial Achievement in Comedy Series	Directing team (for "Milk Money")	Nominated	
2016	Best Production Design – Television Series	Brendan Smith	Nominated	
2019	Best Production Design – Comedy or Family Series	Brendan Smith (for "Life Is a Cabaret")	Nominated	
2020	Outstanding Directorial Achievement in a Comedy Series	Daniel Levy and Andrew Cividino (for "Happy Ending")	Won	
2020	Best Picture Editing – Comedy or Family Series	Paul Winestock (for "Start Spreading the News")	Won	

== Dorian Awards ==
Year	Category	Nominee	Result	Ref
2019	TV Comedy of the Year	Schitt's Creek	Won	
2019	Unsung TV Show of the Year	Schitt's Creek	Won	
2019	TV Musical Performance of the Year	Noah Reid, "Simply the Best"	Nominated	
2020	TV Comedy of the Year	Schitt's Creek	Nominated	
2020	TV Performance of the Year – Actress	Catherine O'Hara	Nominated	
2020	TV Performance of the Year – Actor	Daniel Levy	Nominated	
2020	TV Musical Performance of the Year	Annie Murphy, "A Little Bit Alexis"	Nominated	
2020	LGBTQ Show of the Year	Schitt's Creek	Nominated	
2020	Wilde Wit of the Year	Daniel Levy	Nominated	

== Dorian TV Awards ==
Year	Category	Nominee	Result	Ref
2020	Best TV Comedy	Schitt's Creek	Won	
2020	Best TV Performance – Actress	Catherine O' Hara	Won	
2020	Best TV Performance – Actor	Eugene Levy	Nominated	
2020	Best TV Performance – Supporting Actress	Annie Murphy	Won	
2020	Best TV Performance – Supporting Actor	Daniel Levy	Won	
2020	Best TV Musical Performance	Noah Reid, "Always Be My Baby"	Nominated	
2020	Best LGBTQ TV Show	Schitt's Creek	Won	
2020	Wilde Wit Award	Daniel Levy	Won	

== GLAAD Media Awards ==
Year	Category	Nominee	Result	Ref
2019	GLAAD Davidson/Valentini Award	Daniel Levy	Awarded	
2019	Outstanding Comedy Series	Schitt's Creek	Nominated	
2020	Outstanding Comedy Series	Schitt's Creek	Won	
2021	Outstanding Comedy Series	Schitt's Creek	Won	

== Golden Globe Awards ==
Year	Category	Nominee	Result	Ref
2021	Best Television Series – Musical or Comedy	Schitt's Creek	Won	
2021	Best Actor – Television Series Musical or Comedy	Eugene Levy	Nominated	
2021	Best Actress – Television Series Musical or Comedy	Catherine O'Hara	Won	
2021	Best Supporting Actor – Television	Daniel Levy	Nominated	
2021	Best Supporting Actress – Television	Annie Murphy	Nominated	

== Golden Maple Awards ==
Year	Category	Nominee	Result	Ref
2015	Newcomer of the Year in a TV Series Broadcasted in the U.S.	Emily Hampshire	Won	
2016	Best Actress in a TV Series Broadcast in the U.S.	Emily Hampshire	Nominated	

== Gracie Awards ==
Year	Category	Nominee	Result	Ref
2019	Actress in a Breakthrough Role	Annie Murphy	Won	
2021	Actress in a Leading Role - Comedy or Musical	Catherine O'Hara	Won	

== Hollywood Critics Association Midseason Awards ==
Year	Category	Nominee	Result	Ref
2020	Best Cable Network Series (New or Recurring)	Schitt's Creek	Runner-up	

== INSPIRE Awards ==
Year	Category	Nominee	Result	Ref
2019	International Icon Award	Schitt's Creek	Awarded	

== Make-Up Artists and Hair Stylists Guild Awards ==
Year	Category	Nominee	Result	Ref
2021	Best Contemporary Make-Up	Candice Ornstein and Kerry Vaughan	Nominated	
2021	Best Contemporary Hair Styling	Annastasia Cucullo and Ana Sorys	Won	

== MTV Movie & TV Awards ==
Year	Category	Nominee	Result	Ref
2018	Best Comedic Performance	Daniel Levy	Nominated	
2019	Best Show	Schitt's Creek	Nominated	
2019	Best Comedic Performance	Daniel Levy	Won	
2021	Best Comedic Performance	Annie Murphy	Nominated	

== People's Choice Awards ==
Year	Category	Nominee	Result	Ref
2019	Comedy Show of 2019	Schitt's Creek	Nominated	
2020	Comedy Show of 2020	Schitt's Creek	Nominated	
2020	Bingeworthy Show of 2020	Schitt's Creek	Nominated	
2020	Male TV Star of 2020	Daniel Levy	Nominated	
2020	Comedy TV Star of 2020	Daniel Levy	Nominated	

== Primetime Emmy Awards ==
Year	Category	Nominee	Result	Ref
2019	Outstanding Comedy Series	Eugene Levy, Daniel Levy, David West Read, Andrew Barnsley, Fred Levy, Ben Feigin, Mike Short, Rupinder Gill, and Colin Brunton	Nominated	
2019	Outstanding Lead Actor in a Comedy Series	Eugene Levy (for "Rock On!")	Nominated	
2019	Outstanding Lead Actress in a Comedy Series	Catherine O'Hara (for "The Crowening")	Nominated	
2019	Outstanding Contemporary Costumes	Debra Hanson and Darci Cheyne (for "The Dress")	Nominated	
2020	Outstanding Comedy Series	Eugene Levy, Daniel Levy, David West Read, Andrew Barnsley, Fred Levy, Ben Feigin, Mike Short, Kurt Smeaton, and Kosta Orfanidis	Won	
2020	Outstanding Lead Actor in a Comedy Series	Eugene Levy (for "The Pitch")	Won	
2020	Outstanding Lead Actress in a Comedy Series	Catherine O'Hara (for "The Incident")	Won	
2020	Outstanding Supporting Actor in a Comedy Series	Daniel Levy (for "Happy Ending")	Won	
2020	Outstanding Supporting Actress in a Comedy Series	Annie Murphy (for "The Presidential Suite")	Won	
2020	Outstanding Writing for a Comedy Series	Daniel Levy (for "Happy Ending")	Won	
2020	Outstanding Writing for a Comedy Series	David West Read (for "The Presidential Suite")	Nominated	
2020	Outstanding Directing for a Comedy Series	Daniel Levy and Andrew Cividino (for "Happy Ending")	Won	
2020	Outstanding Contemporary Costumes	Debra Hanson and Darci Cheyne (for "Happy Ending")	Won	
2020	Outstanding Casting for a Comedy Series	Lisa Parasyn and Jon Comerford	Won	
2020	Outstanding Contemporary Hairstyling	Anastasia Cucullo and Ana Sorys (for "Happy Ending")	Nominated	
2020	Outstanding Contemporary Makeup (Non-Prosthetic)	Candice Ornstein and Lucky Bromhead (for "Happy Ending")	Nominated	
2020	Outstanding Single-Camera Picture Editing for a Comedy Series	Paul Winestock (for "Start Spreading the News")	Nominated	
2020	Outstanding Single-Camera Picture Editing for a Comedy Series	Trevor Ambrose (for "Happy Ending")	Nominated	
2020	Outstanding Sound Mixing for a Comedy or Drama Series (Half Hour) and Animation	Bryan Day and Martin Lee (for "Happy Ending")	Nominated	

== Producers Guild of America Awards ==
Year	Category	Nominee	Result	Ref
2020	Danny Thomas Award for Outstanding Producer of Episodic Television – Comedy	Schitt's Creek (Eugene Levy, Daniel Levy, Andrew Barnsley, Fred Levy, David West Read, Ben Feigin, Mike Short, Rupinder Gill, Colin Brunton)	Nominated	
2021	Danny Thomas Award for Outstanding Producer of Episodic Television – Comedy	Schitt's Creek (Eugene Levy, Daniel Levy, Andrew Barnsley, Fred Levy, David West Read, Ben Feigin, Mike Short, Kurt Smeaton, Kosta Orfanidis)	Won	

== Satellite Awards ==
Year	Category	Nominee	Result	Ref
2019	Actress in a Series, Comedy or Musical	Catherine O'Hara	Nominated	
2019	Actor in a Series, Comedy or Musical	Eugene Levy	Nominated	
2020	Television Series, Comedy or Musical	Schitt's Creek	Won	
2020	Actress in a Series, Comedy or Musical	Catherine O'Hara	Nominated	
2020	Actor in a Series, Comedy or Musical	Eugene Levy	Won	

== Screen Actors Guild (SAG) Awards ==
Year	Category	Nominee	Result	Ref
2019	Outstanding Performance by an Ensemble in a Comedy Series	Chris Elliott, Emily Hampshire, Daniel Levy, Eugene Levy, Sarah Levy, Dustin Milligan, Annie Murphy, Catherine O'Hara, Noah Reid, Jennifer Robertson and Karen Robinson	Nominated	
2019	Outstanding Performance by a Female Actor in a Comedy Series	Catherine O'Hara	Nominated	
2020	Outstanding Performance by an Ensemble in a Comedy Series	Chris Elliott, Emily Hampshire, Daniel Levy, Eugene Levy, Sarah Levy, Annie Murphy, Catherine O'Hara, Noah Reid, Jennifer Robertson and Karen Robinson	Won	
2020	Outstanding Performance by a Male Actor in a Comedy Series	Daniel Levy	Nominated	
2020	Outstanding Performance by a Male Actor in a Comedy Series	Eugene Levy	Nominated	
2020	Outstanding Performance by a Female Actor in a Comedy Series	Annie Murphy	Nominated	
2020	Outstanding Performance by a Female Actor in a Comedy Series	Catherine O'Hara	Won	

== Shorty Awards ==
Year	Category	Nominee	Result	Ref
2020	Best Use of GIFs	Schitt's Creek	Won	

== Television Critics Association (TCA) Awards ==
Year	Category	Nominee	Result	Ref
2019	Outstanding Achievement in Comedy	Schitt's Creek	Nominated	
2019	Outstanding Individual Achievement in Comedy	Catherine O'Hara	Nominated	
2020	Program of the Year	Schitt's Creek	Nominated	
2020	Outstanding Achievement in Comedy	Schitt's Creek	Won	
2020	Outstanding Individual Achievement in Comedy	Catherine O'Hara	Won	

== The Queerties ==
Year	Category	Nominee	Result	Ref
2020	TV Series	Schitt's Creek	Nominated	
2020	TV Performance	Daniel Levy	Won	
2021	TV Series	Schitt's Creek	Won	

== Webby Awards ==
Year	Category	Nominee	Result	Ref
2019	Best Social Media (TV and Film)	Schitt's Creek	Won	
2019	People's Voice Award for TV & Film	Schitt's Creek	Won	

== Writers Guild of Canada Screenwriting Awards ==
Year	Category	Nominee	Result	Ref
2016	Best TV Comedy	Amanda Walsh (for "The Cabin")	Won	
2019	Best Comedy Series	Rupinder Gill (for "RIP Moira Rose")	Won	
2020	Best Comedy Series	Daniel Levy (for "Meet the Parents")	Nominated	
2020	Best Comedy Series	David West Read (for "Love Letters")	Nominated	
2021	Best Comedy Series	Daniel Levy (for "Happy Ending")	Won	
2021	Best Comedy Series	Kurt Smeaton & Winter Tekenos-Levy (for "Sunrise, Sunset")	Nominated	
