= Future History =

Future History or future history may refer to:

- Future history, postulated history of the future
- Future History (Heinlein), series of stories by Robert A. Heinlein
- Future History (album), by Jason Derulo
- Future History (TV series), a Canadian documentary TV series
