= Sackman =

Sackman or Sackmann or Sack Man may refer to:

== People ==
- Erich Sackmann (1934–2024), German biophysicist
- Jeff Sackman, American film producer
- Nicholas Sackman (born 1950), English composer
- Sarah Sackman (born 1984), British politician

== Other ==
- Sackboy, a character in the LittleBigPlanet video game series, sometimes referred to as Sackman
- Sack Man, legendary being who carries naughty children away
