= Willkommen =

Song
- Genre: Cabaret; Show tune; Vaudeville
- Songwriter: John Kander
- Lyricist: Fred Ebb

"Willkommen" is a song from the 1966 musical Cabaret and its 1972 film adaptation, with music and lyrics by songwriting team Kander and Ebb. It serves as the opening musical number, and is performed by the Master of ceremonies of a fictional Berlin nightclub during the Weimar Republic.

== Production ==
John Kander explained "With Cabaret, we were trying to find the piece, to write our way into it. The first thing we wrote was 'Willkommen' and the very first thing that ever happened was that little vamp."

The finale, "Auf Wiedersehen", mixes elements of "Willkommen" and "Cabaret".

== Synopsis ==
The song is "the Emcee’s sardonic introduction" to the Kit Kat Klub, and is set within the cabaret itself.

Professor of Musicology James Leves describes the song in his book Kander and Ebb:

Cabaret dispenses with the traditional Broadway medley overture. In the famous opening scene, the emcee welcomes the cabaret crowd, as well as the theater audience, to the cabaret. The first sound heard is a disembodied drumroll crescendo followed by an anemic cymbal crash. A pregnant pause then gives rise to the plodding vamp of “Willkommen,” arguably the most familiar two measures in musical theater.

== Composition ==
According to the sheet music published by Times Square Music Publications, “Willkommen” is set in the key of B♭ major and performed in cut time with a tempo of “Allegretto.”

The two-measure vamp features a bassline alternating between an F and a B♭, performed against a syncopated B♭-major chord with an added sixth. According to Leve, the "tonic chord, and repeated eighth notes on the offbeats encapsulate the naughty burlesque milieu."

== Analysis ==
Leve suggests that the vamp's appearances in songs in Cabaret performed by the character Sally Bowles (Note: "Don't Tell Mama", which does not appear in the film adaptation, and "Cabaret."), “[foreshadow] Sally’s, as well as Germany’s, downward spiral” over the course of the show.

Filmsite notes this "cheery greeting in German, French and English" contains "three languages to suit the club's cosmopolitan clientele [and] anticipates future hostilities between the three nationalities during wartime".

H2G2 writes that The Emcee "immediately evok[es] the decadent, cosmopolitan atmosphere of 1930s Berlin. 'In here, life is beautiful, the girls are beautiful, even the orchestra is beautiful... we have no troubles here.' These words of the Emcee will come back to haunt the characters later."

New Line Theatre wrote the following analysis on the song and its reprise:

The first song in Cabaret, "Willkommen", functions as both a comment song and a book song. It welcomes us both to the Kit Kat Klub where much of the action will take place, and also to Cabaret, the musical. The Emcee is addressing the audience in the Kit Kat Klub while he also addresses the real audience. Using the opening song this way prepares us for the two different uses to which songs will be put in the show.

At the very end, the Emcee briefly reprises "Willkommen", perhaps an ironic welcome to the new Germany Ernst and the Nazis are building, but the Emcee doesn't finish the final phrase; the song stops, unfinished, and he disappears. We know the story is not over. Herr Schultz will undoubtedly be put in a concentration camp and murdered.

And yet the Emcee is now happy to have helped us “forget” our troubles. Here at the end of the show, he says goodbye only in German (auf wiedersehen) and French (à bientôt). There is no English goodbye. The melody doesn’t end and neither does the lyric. The Emcee doesn’t finish his farewell.

== Critical reception ==
USA Today described it as "deliciously bawdy". The Providence Journal described it as an "opening chorus". The Los Angeles Times said the song was "lascivious".

== In other media ==
Joel Grey performed a rendition of "Willkommen" when he guest starred on The Muppet Show in 1976.

Noah Reid performed the song in an episode of Schitt's Creek, where his character acts in a local production of Cabaret.
