= Future History (TV series) =

Canadian documentary series

Future History is a Canadian documentary series, which premiered in 2018 on APTN. Hosted by Kris Nahrgang and Sarain Fox, the series profiles efforts to reclaim and revive indigenous cultures in Canada.

The hosts were selected for contrast; Fox is a younger indigenous activist, while Nahrgang is an older man who was raised largely disconnected from his own indigenous heritage, and is himself on a journey of discovery. Some of the people featured in this series include artists Chief Lady Bird and Mo Thunder.

The series was created by actress and producer Jennifer Podemski.

The series received three Canadian Screen Award nominations at the 8th Canadian Screen Awards in 2020, all for the episode "Awaken/Goshkoziwin": Best Editing in a Factual Program or Series (Ian Sit), Best Direction in a Factual Program or Series (Jennifer Podemski) and Best Writing in a Factual Program or Series (Tamara Podemski). Jennifer Podemski won the award for Best Direction.
