= 8th Canadian Screen Awards =

8th year of awards given by the Academy of Canadian Cinema & Television

- Date: 25–28 May 2020
- Hosted by: Lloyd Robertson; Herbie Kuhn; Maitreyi Ramakrishnan; Emma Hunter; Evany Rosen; Kayla Lorette; Eric McCormack; Théodore Pellerin

Highlights
- Most awards: Antigone and The Song of Names (film), Cardinal (television)
- Most nominations: The Song of Names (film), Schitt's Creek (television)
- Best Motion Picture: Antigone
- Best Dramatic Series: Cardinal
- Best Comedy Series: Schitt's Creek

The 8th Canadian Screen Awards were presented by the Academy of Canadian Cinema and Television from 25–28 May 2020 to honour achievements in Canadian film, television, and digital media production in 2019. The presentations were held as a series of virtual events due to the COVID-19 pandemic.

Nominations were announced on 18 February, with François Girard's The Song of Names leading in film nominations with 9, and Dan and Eugene Levy's sitcom Schitt's Creek leading in television with 26 nominations. Sophie Deraspe's Antigone would be the most-awarded film and win Best Motion Picture, while Cardinal would be the most-awarded television series.

== Ceremony information ==
The ceremony was originally scheduled to be held on 29 March 2020. On 12 March, the Academy announced that the Canadian Screen Awards and all associated activities had been cancelled due to the COVID-19 pandemic in Canada. On 28 March, the Academy stated that it would announce the winners at a later date "when the time is right", citing the "great uncertainty" of the situation.

On 5 May 2020, the Academy announced that it would present the awards as a series of pre-recorded virtual presentations streamed on its website and social media outlets from 25–28 May. The streaming presentations were produced with the support of the CBC, CTV, and Telefilm Canada. The first stream on 25 May presented the awards in news, sports, and documentary categories. Children's, youth, lifestyle, and reality programming were presented on 26 May, scripted television programming was presented on 27 May, and films were presented on 28 May.

== Special awards ==
The first recipients of the academy's special awards were announced on December 4, 2019.

- Lifetime Achievement Award: David Suzuki
- Margaret Collier Award: David Shore
- Radius Award: Dan Levy
- Earle Grey Award: Tina Keeper
- Academy Icon Award: Alex Trebek
- Gordon Sinclair Award: Anton Koschany
- Board of Directors Tribute: Michael Donovan, Robin Mirsky
- Humanitarian Award: Nathalie Younglai
- Industry Leadership Award: Crave
- Outstanding Media Innovation Award: Secret Location

Despite having been announced in the leadup to the 2020 awards, the special awards were all ultimately presented at the 9th Canadian Screen Awards in 2021, with no new recipients named for that year.

== Film ==
| Best Motion Picture | Best Director |
|---|---|
| Antigone — Marc Daigle; Anne at 13,000 Ft. — Dan Montgomery, Kazik Radwanski; The Body Remembers When the World Broke Open — Tyler Hagan, Lori Lozinski; The Twentieth Century — Ménaïc Raoul, Gabrielle Tougas-Fréchette; White Lie — Karen Harnisch, Yonah Lewis, Calvin Thomas, Katie Bird Nolan, Lindsay Tapscott | Elle-Máijá Tailfeathers and Kathleen Hepburn, The Body Remembers When the World Broke Open; Sophie Deraspe, Antigone; Kazik Radwanski, Anne at 13,000 Ft.; Matthew Rankin, The Twentieth Century; Calvin Thomas and Yonah Lewis, White Lie |
| Best Actor | Best Actress |
| Mark O'Brien, Goalie; Dan Beirne, The Twentieth Century; Marc-André Grondin, Mafia Inc.; Ryan McDonald, Black Conflux; Gilbert Sicotte, And the Birds Rained Down (Il pleuvait des oiseaux) | Nahéma Ricci, Antigone; Deragh Campbell, Anne at 13,000 Ft.; Violet Nelson, The Body Remembers When the World Broke Open; Kacey Rohl, White Lie; Elle-Máijá Tailfeathers, The Body Remembers When the World Broke Open |
| Best Supporting Actor | Best Supporting Actress |
| Rémy Girard, And the Birds Rained Down (Il pleuvait des oiseaux); Douglas Grégoire, Kuessipan; Matt Johnson, Anne at 13,000 Ft.; Andy McQueen, Disappearance at Clifton Hill; Daniel Stern, James vs. His Future Self | Nour Belkhiria, Antigone; Leanna Chea, 14 Days, 12 Nights (14 jours, 12 nuits); Larissa Corriveau, Ghost Town Anthology (Répertoire des villes disparus); Yamie Grégoire, Kuessipan; Alison Midstokke, Happy Face |
| Best Original Screenplay | Best Adapted Screenplay |
| Kathleen Hepburn and Elle-Máijá Tailfeathers, The Body Remembers When the World Broke Open; Jonas Chernick and Jeremy Lalonde, James vs. His Future Self; Anne Émond, Young Juliette (Jeune Juliette); Matthew Rankin, The Twentieth Century; Calvin Thomas and Yonah Lewis, White Lie | Sophie Deraspe, Antigone; Louise Archambault, And the Birds Rained Down (Il pleuvait des oiseaux); Denis Côté, Ghost Town Anthology (Répertoire des villes disparus); Guillaume de Fontenay, Guillaume Vigneault and Jean Barbe, Sympathy for the Devil (Sympathie pour le diable); Myriam Verreault and Naomi Fontaine, Kuessipan |
| Best Feature Length Documentary | Best Short Documentary |
| Nîpawistamâsowin: We Will Stand Up — Tasha Hubbard, George Hupka, Jon Montes, Bonnie Thompson, Kathy Avrich-Johnson, David Christensen, Janice Dawe; Alexander Odyssey (Alexandre le fou) — Pedro Pires; Gordon Lightfoot: If You Could Read My Mind — Martha Kehoe, Joan Tosoni, John Brunton, John Murray, Gary Slaight, Allan Slaight; Invisible Essence: The Little Prince — Gordon Henderson, Michael A. Levine, Michel St. Cyr, Guy Villeneuve, Stuart Henderson, Jake Yanowski, Mathieu Amadei, Charles Officer; Prey — Matt Gallagher, Cornelia Principe | Take Me to Prom — Andrew Moir; Acadiana — Guillaume Fournier, Samuel Matteau, Yannick Nolin, Jean-Pierre Vezina; Gun Killers — Jason Young, Rohan Fernando, Annette Clarke; No Crying at the Dinner Table — Carol Nguyen, Aziz Zoromba; Now Is the Time — Christopher Auchter, Selwyn Jacob, Shirley Vercruysse |
| Best Live Action Short Drama | Best Animated Short |
| Pick — Alicia K. Harris; Black Forest (Forêt Noire) — Jean-Marc E. Roy, Philippe David Gagné, Julie Groleau; Just Me and You (Juste moi et toi) — Sandrine Brodeur-Desrosiers, Johannie Deschambault; Kinship — Jorge Camarotti; My Boy (Mon Boy) — Sarah Pellerin, Fanny-Laure Malo, Annie-Claude Quirion | Giant Bear — Neil Christopher, Daniel Gies, Emily Paige; Docking — Trevor Anderson, Alyson Richards; Pinch — Diego Maclean; Shannon Amen — Chris Dainty, Maral Mohammadian, Michael Fukushima; Uncle Thomas: Accounting for the Days — Regina Pessoa, Abi Feijó, Julie Roy, Reginald de Guillebon |
| Best Art Direction / Production Design | Best Cinematography |
| Dany Boivin, The Twentieth Century; Chris Crane, Run This Town; Jennifer Morden and Danny Haeberlin, Riot Girls; François Séguin and Pierre Perrault, The Song of Names; Marian Wihak and Svjetlana Jaklenec, Stand! | Norm Li, The Body Remembers When the World Broke Open; Josée Deshaies, A Brother's Love (La femme de mon frère); Catherine Lutes, Disappearance at Clifton Hill; Gregory Middleton, American Woman; Brendan Steacy, Lucky Day |
| Best Costume Design | Best Editing |
| Patricia McNeil, The Twentieth Century; Anne Dixon, The Song of Names; Patricia McNeil, A Brother's Love (La femme de mon frère); Caroline Poirier, And the Birds Rained Down (Il pleuvait des oiseaux); Marissa Schwartz and Mara Zigler, American Woman | Geoffrey Boulangé and Sophie Deraspe, Antigone; Lara Johnston, Mouthpiece; Cam McLauchlin, Disappearance at Clifton Hill; Simone Smith, Goalie; Wiebke von Carolsfeld, An Audience of Chairs |
| Best Overall Sound | Best Sound Editing |
| Claude La Haye, Bernard Gariépy Strobl, Mark Appleby and Daniel Bisson, The Song of Names; Stéphane Bergeron, Antigone; Jean Camden, Sylvain Bellemare, Bernard Gariépy Strobl and Stéphane Larivière, And the Birds Rained Down (Il pleuvait des oiseaux); Gavin Fernandes and Normand Lapierre, Jouliks; David Ottier, Matt Chan and Graham Rogers, Goalie | Francine Poirier, Claude Beaugrand, Michel B. Bordeleau, Raymond Legault, Lise Wedlock and Natalie Fleurant, The Song of Names; Paul Germann, Claire Dobson, John Sievert, Jason Charbonneau and Randy Wilson, Disappearance at Clifton Hill; Krystin Hunter, Brent Pickett, Paul Germann, Goro Koyama and Sandra Fox, Goalie; Dashen Naidoo, Tyler Whitham, Stephen Barden, Scott Donald and Nelson Ferreira, Lucky Day; Nelson Ferreira, Dashen Naidoo, J.R. Fountain and Dustin Harris, Run This Town |
| Best Original Score | Best Original Song |
| Howard Shore, The Song of Names; Robert Carli, Lie Exposed; Peter Chapman, Riot Girls; Ian LeFeuvre and Stephen Krecklo, James vs. His Future Self; Andrew Lockington, The Kindness of Strangers | Howard Shore, "The Song of Names (Cantor Prayer)" — The Song of Names; Peter Chapman and Leslie Seaforth, "We Run the World" — Riot Girls; Ian LeFeuvre, "Travel Through" — James vs. His Future Self; Bramwell Tovey and Richard Bell, "I've Got a Big One" — Brotherhood |
| Best Makeup | Best Hair |
| Fanny Vachon, The Song of Names; Brandi Boulet and Chris Bridges, Riot Girls; Randy Daudlin, Goalie; Emily O'Quinn, Steve Newburn and Neil Morrill, Run This Town; Candice Ornstein, American Woman | Nermin Grbic, The Twentieth Century; Dann Campbell, Riot Girls; Michelle Coté, Péter Gyongyosi and Erzsébet Racz, The Song of Names; Peggy Kyriakidou, American Woman; Nathan Rival, The Kindness of Strangers |
| Best Cinematography in a Feature Length Documentary | Best Editing in a Feature Length Documentary |
| Pedro Ruiz, Havana, from on High; Mathieu Arsenault, Head First (Tenir tête); Grant Baldwin, This Mountain Life; Léna Mill-Reuillard, Stéphanie Weber Biron and Étienne Boilard, City Dreamers; Pedro Pires, Alexander Odyssey (Alexandre le fou) | Sophie Leblond, Pedro Pires and Sylvia de Angelis, Alexander Odyssey (Alexandre le fou); Nick Hector, Prey; Bruce Lapointe, Invisible Essence: The Little Prince; David New, Propaganda: The Art of Selling Lies; Eamonn O'Connor and Daniel Roher, Once Were Brothers: Robbie Robertson and The Band |
| Best Visual Effects | John Dunning Best First Feature Award |
| Adam Jewett, Steve Ramone, Michelle Brennen, Tim Sibley, Aneesh Bhatnagar, Saikrishna Aleti, Peter Giliberti, Alex Basso, Arminus Billones and Marshall Lau, Brotherhood; Sam Javanrouh and Helen Thach, Astronaut; Steven Sangster, Road to the Lemon Grove; Benoît Brière and Kinga Sabela, Sympathy for the Devil (Sympathie pour le diable); Marc-Antoine Rousseau, The Song of Names | Murmur — Heather Young; Black Conflux — Nicole Dorsey; Mad Dog Labine — Jonathan Beaulieu-Cyr, Renaud Lessard; Sympathy for the Devil (Sympathie pour le diable) — Guillaume de Fontenay; The Twentieth Century — Matthew Rankin |
| Special awards | |
| Golden Screen Award: Compulsive Liar (Menteur) | |

== Television ==
=== Programs ===
| Drama Series | Comedy Series |
|---|---|
| Cardinal; Anne with an E; Coroner; Mary Kills People; Vikings | Schitt's Creek; Jann; Kim's Convenience; Letterkenny; Workin' Moms |
| Animated Program or series | Documentary Program |
| Corner Gas Animated; Cupcake & Dino: General Services; Daniel Tiger's Neighbourhood; Total Dramarama; Wild Kratts | To the Worlds; Etthén Heldeli: Caribou Eaters; Humboldt: The New Season; I Think You've Been Looking for Me; The Mill |
| Children's or Youth Fiction | Children's or Youth Non-Fiction |
| Holly Hobbie; Backstage; Big Top Academy; Creeped Out | Just Like Mom and Dad; It's My Party!; Raven's Quest; Super Mighty Makers |
| TV movie | History Documentary Program or Series |
| Believe Me: The Abduction of Lisa McVey; #Roxy; Claws of the Red Dragon; Daughter of the Wolf; Nowhere to Be Found | The Accountant of Auschwitz; 9/11: Cleared for Chaos; D-Day in 14 Stories; Make It to the Moon; The Oslo Diaries |
| Biography or Arts Documentary Program or Series | Lifestyle Program or Series |
| Finding the Secret Path; Engraved on a Nation; Exhibitionists; Game Changers; I'm Going to Break Your Heart | Mary's Kitchen Crush; Home to Win; Island of Bryan; Property Brothers; Where to I Do? |
| Pre-School Program or Series | Reality/Competition Program or Series |
| PAW Patrol; Abby Hatcher; Dino Dana; Rusty Rivets; True and the Rainbow Kingdom | The Amazing Race Canada; Big Brother Canada; Blown Away; The Great Canadian Baking Show; Top Chef Canada |
| Science or Nature Documentary Program or Series (Rob Stewart Award) | Social/Political Documentary Program (Donald Brittain Award) |
| The Nature of Things: "A Day in the Life of Earth"; Equator: A New World View; The Nature of Things: "The Genetic Revolution"; The Nature of Things: "Remarkable Rabbits"; The Nature of Things: "Turtle Beach" | Mr. Jane and Finch; In Search of a Perfect World; The Invisible Heart; Village of the Missing |
| Factual Program or Series | Sketch Comedy Show & Ensemble Performance |
| Disasters at Sea; Employable Me; First Contact; It Happened Here; Paramedics: Life on the Line | Baroness von Sketch Show; The Beaverton; TallBoyz; This Hour Has 22 Minutes |
| Live Entertainment Special | Talk Program or Series |
| Juno Awards of 2019; 2018 Scotiabank Giller Prize; 7th Canadian Screen Awards; eTalk Live at the Oscars | The Social; APTN InFocus; The Marilyn Denis Show; Question Period |
| Variety or Entertainment | Entertainment News Program or Series |
| 'Trevor Noah Live at JFL; 2019 Indspire Awards; Air Farce New Year's Eve 2018; eTalk Presents: The Big Bang Theory; We Day 2018 | eTalk; Entertainment Tonight Canada; eTalk Presents TIFF 2018 |
Golden Screen Awards
Fiction: Murdoch Mysteries and Private Eyes; Reality: The Amazing Race Canada

=== Acting ===
| Lead Actor, Drama | Lead Actress, Drama |
|---|---|
| Billy Campbell, Cardinal; Roger Cross, Coroner; Shawn Doyle, Unspeakable; Peter Mooney, Burden of Truth; Jerry O'Connell, Carter | Karine Vanasse, Cardinal; Caroline Dhavernas, Mary Kills People; Amybeth McNulty, Anne with an E; Lauren Lee Smith, Frankie Drake Mysteries; Serinda Swan, Coroner |
| Lead Actor, Comedy | Lead Actress, Comedy |
| Eugene Levy, Schitt's Creek; Jared Keeso, Letterkenny; Paul Sun Hyung Lee, Kim's Convenience; Dan Levy, Schitt's Creek; Jason Priestley, Private Eyes | Catherine O'Hara, Schitt's Creek; Jann Arden, Jann; Annie Murphy, Schitt's Creek; Michelle Mylett, Letterkenny; Jean Yoon, Kim's Convenience |
| Supporting Actor, Drama | Supporting Actress, Drama |
| Thom Allison, Killjoys; Brendan Fehr, Daughter of the Wolf; Brandon Oakes, Diggstown; Rossif Sutherland, Believe Me: The Abduction of Lisa McVey; Hugh Thompson, Forgive Me | Kristen Thomson, Cardinal; Rosemary Dunsmore, Street Legal; Kelly McCormack, Killjoys; Karen Robinson, Forgive Me; Elizabeth Saunders, Mary Kills People |
| Supporting Actor, Comedy | Supporting Actress, Comedy |
| Andrew Phung, Kim's Convenience; Chris Elliott, Schitt's Creek; Mark Forward, Letterkenny; Dustin Milligan, Schitt's Creek; Noah Reid, Schitt's Creek | Emily Hampshire, Schitt's Creek; Sarah Levy, Schitt's Creek; Nicole Power, Kim's Convenience; Jennifer Robertson, Schitt's Creek; Mary Walsh, Little Dog |
| Guest Performance, Drama Series | Guest Performance, Comedy |
| Dalmar Abuzeid, Anne with an E; David Fox, Mary Kills People; Deborah Grover, Mary Kills People; Rya Kihlstedt, Cardinal; Stephen Ouimette, Cardinal | Amanda Brugel, Kim's Convenience; Dan Aykroyd, Workin' Moms; Wendy Crewson, Workin' Moms; Rick Mercer, Jann; Scott Thompson, The Beaverton |
| Lead Performance, TV Movie | Performance, Children's or Youth |
| Kate Drummond, Nowhere to Be Found; Dan Chameroy, A Christmas Carol: The Family Musical with a Scrooge Loose!; Katie Douglas, Believe Me: The Abduction of Lisa McVey; Allie MacDonald, Mean Queen | Saara Chaudry, Dino Dana; Saara Chaudry, Holly Hobbie; Hunter Dillon, Holly Hobbie; Kate Moyer, Holly Hobbie; Tomaso Sanelli, Creeped Out |
Performance, Animation
Brent Butt, Corner Gas Animated; Paul Braunstein, Agent Binky: Pets of the Universe; Mark Little, Cupcake & Dino: General Services; Patrick McKenna, Esme & Roy; Eric Peterson, Corner Gas Animated

=== News and information ===
| Live News Special | Local Newscast |
|---|---|
| D-Day Remembered: The 75th Anniversary (CTV News); CBC News Special: Raptors Championship Parade (CBC News); Raptors Win (Citytv Toronto) | CityNews; CBC Ottawa News at 6; CBC Windsor News at 6; Global BC News Hour at 6 |
| National Newscast | News or Information Series |
| CTV National News; APTN National News; CBC News: The National; Global National | The Fifth Estate; APTN Investigates; CBC News: Marketplace; W5 |
| News Anchor, Local | News Anchor, National |
| Adrian Harewood and Lucy van Oldenbarneveld, CBC Ottawa News at Six; Debra Arbec, CBC Montreal News at Six; Michelle Dubé and Ken Shaw, CTV News Toronto at 6; Adrian Ghobrial, Ginella Massa, Mark McAllister, Adam Stiles, and Tina Yazdani, Raptors Win (Citytv Toronto) | Adrienne Arsenault, Rosemary Barton, Andrew Chang and Ian Hanomansing, The National; Dawna Friesen, Global National; Lisa LaFlamme, CTV National News; Dennis Ward and Melissa Ridgen, APTN National News |
| News or Information Program | News or Information Segment |
| W5: "The Baby in the Snow"; CBC News: The National: "Conversation: Legalizing Cannabis"; The Fifth Estate: "Unbuckled: School Bus Safety"; Marketplace: "CRA Scam"; W5: "The Narco Riviera" | CBC News: The National: "Scars Left Behind"; CBC Saskatchewan News at Six: "January 9, 2019"; The Fifth Estate: "A Brother's Story"; W5: "The Laundromat" |
| National Reporter | Local Reporter |
| Paul Hunter, CBC News: The National; Susan Ormiston, CBC News: The National; Omar Sachedina, CTV National News; Paul Workman, CTV National News | Rumina Daya, Global BC News Hour at 6; Farrah Merali, CBC Toronto News at Six; Cynthia Mulligan, CityNews; Angela Sterritt, CBC Vancouver News at Six |
| Host or interviewer, news or information program or series | Host, factual or reality competition |
| Avery Haines, W5: "The Narco Riviera"; Adrienne Arsenault, CBC News Special: D-Day 75; David Common, Marketplace; Mark Kelley, The Fifth Estate | Jon Montgomery, The Amazing Race Canada; Michael Bonacini, Alvin Leung and Claudio Aprile, Masterchef Canada; Julia Chan and Dan Levy, The Great Canadian Baking Show; Kylee Evans and Sandy Jobin-Bevans, Just Like Mom and Dad; Jonny Harris, Still Standing |
| Host, Talk Show or Entertainment News | Host, Lifestyle |
| Evan Solomon, Question Period; Marilyn Denis, The Marilyn Denis Show; Danielle Graham, Elaine Lui and Jess Allen, Love Island: Aftersun; Kaniehtiio Horn and Michelle Thrush, 2018 Indspire Awards; Elaine Lui, eTalk presents: Coming Home with Sandra Oh | Mary Berg, Mary's Kitchen Crush; Bryan Baeumler and Sarah Baeumler, Island of Bryan; John Catucci, Big Food Bucket List; Sangita Patel, Home to Win; Jonathan Scott and Drew Scott, Property Brothers: Forever Home |
| Host, Live Entertainment Special | Morning Show |
| Rick Mercer, 2018 Scotiabank Giller Prize; Gerry Dee, New Year's Eve Countdown to 2019; Sarah McLachlan, Juno Awards of 2019; Ben Mulroney, Danielle Graham and Elaine Lui, eTalk Live at the Oscars | Breakfast Television; CP24 Breakfast; Your Morning |

=== Sports ===
| Live Sporting Event | Sports Analysis or Commentary |
|---|---|
| 2019 NBA Finals: Game 6 - TSN; 106th Grey Cup; 2019 RBC Equestrian Grand Prix of Canada | Helen Upperton, 2017–18 Bobsleigh World Cup: "Women's Final"; Jack Armstrong, 2019 NBA Finals: Game 6; Tracy Austin, 2019 Rogers Cup; Carmelina Moscato, 2019 FIFA Women's World Cup: "Canada vs. Sweden" |
| Sports Host | Sports Play by Play Announcer |
| James Duthie, 2019 Free Agent Frenzy; Kate Beirness, 2019 FIFA Women's World Cup Pre-Show; Andi Petrillo, Road to the Olympic Games; Scott Russell, 2018–19 Grand Prix of Figure Skating Final | Matt Devlin, 2019 NBA Finals: Game 6; Chris Cuthbert, 106th Grey Cup; Luke Wileman, 2019 FIFA Women's World Cup: "Canada vs. Sweden" |
| Sports Feature Segment | Sports Opening |
| George Skoutakis, Jeremy McElhanney, Devon Burns, Jason McKinnon, Stephen Brunt and Marc LeBlanc, "Charlie Montoyo: Niño de Oro" (Rogers Sportsnet); Josh Shiaman, Simon Garan, Ryan Rishaug, Michael Banani and Darren Oliver, "2 Roads to Humboldt" (The Sports Network); Josh Shiaman, Rick Westhead, Jason Wessel, Kevin Fallis and Jacob Frenkel, "Phonzie" (The Sports Network); Paul Haber, Peter Akman, Jerry Vienneau, Kirk Neff, Angelo Altomare, W5: "Fred VanVleet: Against All Odds" | Ed Hall, Joshua Wilder, Jeff Shelegy, Jamie Hodgson, Tom Watkins and Chris Nasso, "Bob Cole's Final Game" (Hockey Night in Canada); Matt Dorman, Adam Fair, Kevin Fallis, Stephen Gilmore, Matt Mamic, James Judges and Devon Burns, 2019 FIFA Women's World Cup; Paul Sidhu, Karl Amani Wailoo, James Sharpe, Damian Kearns and John Woo, "Rise Up Canada: Toronto Raptors" (2019 NBA Finals) |
| Sports Program or Series | |
29 Forever; Hometown Hockey: "Enoch Cree Nation"; Open Gym: The Finals; Road to the Olympic Games

=== Craft awards ===
| Editorial Research | Visual Research |
|---|---|
| Ricki Gurwitz, The Accountant of Auschwitz; Valerie Ouellet, Caitlin Taylor, Sylvene Gilchrist and Makda Ghebreslassie, Marketplace: "Shopping for Breast Implants"; Shayla Howell, Maya Bilbao and Arden Wray, Still Standing: "East Preston"; Avery Haines, Stephen Grant and Madeline McNair, W5: "Peril in Paradise"; Allya Davidson, Avery Haines and Madeline McNair, W5: "Suspect Zero" | Ricki Gurwitz, The Accountant of Auschwitz; Elspeth Domville, BTK: A Killer Among Us; Kristine Ryall, Hitler's Most Wanted; Kathlene Calahan and George Hoff, W5: "The ATA Girls"; Kathlene Calahan and Anton Koschany, W5: "The Laundromat" |
| Achievement in Make-Up | Costume Design |
| Randy Daudin, Trina Brink and Paul Jones, Cardinal: "Helen"; Diane Mazur, Anne with an E: "The Summit of My Desires"; Dorota Mitoraj and Traci Loader, Coroner: "Bunny"; Craig-Ryan French, Killjoys: "Last Dance"; Deb Drennan, Murdoch Mysteries: "Brother's Keeper" | Alexander Reda, Anne with an E: "The Summit of My Desires"; Michael Ground, Frontier: "The House of the Lord"; Trysha Bakker, Killjoys: "Last Dance"; Ruth Secord, Kim's Convenience: "Appanticitis"; Debra Hanson, Schitt's Creek: "Life Is a Cabaret" |
| Photography, Comedy | Photography, Documentary or Factual |
| Robert Scarborough, Baroness von Sketch Show: "Humanity Is in an Awkward Stage"; Cabot McNenly, Cavendish: "Charlottetown Nights"; Jim Westenbrink, Letterkenny: "The City"; Gerald Packer, Schitt's Creek: "Life Is a Cabaret"; Maya Bankovic, Workin' Moms: "Girl's Trip" | Maya Bankovic and Ann Tipper, In the Making: "Rebecca Belmore"; Derek Rogers, D-Day in 14 Stories; Alex Margineanu, The Oslo Diaries; Joshua J. See, The Nature of Things: "Remarkable Rabbits"; Jeff Cole, Still Standing: "Churchill" |
| Photography, Drama | Photography, Lifestyle or Reality/Competition |
| Catherine Lutes, Anne with an E: "A Hope of Meeting You in Another World"; Sasha Moric, Believe Me: The Abduction of Lisa McVey; Thom Best, Burden of Truth: "Salesman, Cheats and Liars"; Celiana Cárdenas, Diggstown: "Nikki Leblanc"; Ian Vatcher, Hudson & Rex: "Blind Justice"; Daniel Villeneuve, Mean Queen | Ryan Shaw, The Amazing Race Canada: "Clamageddon Continues"; Kieran Crilly, 50 Ways to Kill Your Mum: "John and Marilyn"; Ryan Shaw, Fire Masters: "Hearts on Fire"; John Queenan and Adrian Smith, Island of Bryan: "Power Struggle"; Colin Evans, Property Brothers: Forever Home: "JD and Annalee"; Stephen McIntyre and Ryan Morgan, Survivor: Edge of Extinction Secrets with ET Canada |
| Photography, News or Information | Picture Editing, Comedy |
| Jared Thomas, CBC News: The National: "Dying Glaciers"; Rob Smith, APTN Investigates: "Dark Valley"; David Macintoch, Marketplace: "CRA Scam"; John Badcock, The Fifth Estate: "Murder in the Jungle"; Jerry Vienneau, W5: "The Narco Riviera" | Mike Fly, Marianna Khoury, Aren Hansen, Sean Song and Nick Wong, Baroness von Sketch Show: "Humanity Is in an Awkward Stage"; Drew MacLeod, Letterkenny: "Dyck's Slip Out"; Kyle Martin, Letterkenny: "Letterkenny vs. Penny"; Trevor Ambrose, Schitt's Creek: "Life Is a Cabaret"; Paul Winestock, Schitt's Creek: "Meet the Parents" |
| Picture Editing, Drama | Picture Editing, Documentary |
| Matthew Anas, Cardinal: "Sam"; D. Gillian Truster, Anne with an E: "A Strong Effort of the Spirit of Good"; Lisa Grootenboer, Anne with an E: "The Summit of My Desires"; Don Cassidy, Vikings: "Baldur"; Michele Conroy and Dan Briceno, Vikings: "The Revelation" | Pauline Decroix, Engraved on a Nation; Ted Husband, The Accountant of Auschwitz; Michael Hannan, D-Day in 14 Stories; Greg West, The Nature of Things: "A Day in the Life of Earth"; Carole Larsen, Equator: A New World View |
| Picture Editing, Factual | Picture Editing, Reality/Competition |
| Aileen McBride, The Fifth Estate: "Murder in the Jungle"; Ian Sit, Future History: "Awaken/Goshkoziwin"; Rob Chandler, Mayday: "Deadly Descent"; Rhonda Thain, Property Brothers: Forever Home: "JD and Annalee"; Jorge Parra, Still Standing: "Churchill" | Michael Tersigni, Mike Scott, Matthew Walsh, Clare Elson and Lisa Barley, The Amazing Race Canada: "Canada Get More Maps"; Al Manson, Ryan Monteith, Jordan Wood, Elianna Borsa, Andrew Gurney, Baun Mah, Seth Poulin, Dan Cable, Chris Donaldson, Clare Elson, Jessica Graore, Chantale Marentette, Jeff Perry, Samantha Shields, Jon White and Jonathan Dowler, Big Brother Canada: "Finale"; Jordan Wood and Chantale Marentette, Iron Chef Canada: "Battle Holiday Nuts"; Al Manson, Elianna Borsa, Dan Cable, Jordan Crute, Clare Elson, Cynthia Flengeris, Ben O’Neil and Seth Poulin, Top Chef Canada: "Winner Takes All"; Bev Ellis, Christine Lam and Jesse Scheer, We Day 2018 |
| Production Design or Art Direction, Fiction | Production Design or Art Direction, Non-Fiction |
| Jean-François Campeau, Michele Brady and Elliott Carew, Anne with an E: "The Summit of My Desires"; Rory Cheyne, Cardinal: "Sam"; Gordon Barnes, Frontier: "The Low Road"; Tim Bider, Mary Kills People: "The Key to Faith"; Brendan Smith, Schitt's Creek: "Life Is a Cabaret" | Michael 'Spike' Parks, The Great Canadian Baking Show: "Cake Week"; Peter Faragher, Andy Roskaft, Kevin Halliday and Aaron Scholl, Big Brother Canada: "Finale"; Tim Luke, Blown Away: "Best in Blow"; Michael 'Spike' Parks, Iron Chef Canada: "Battle Offal"; Florian Schuck, Secrets of the Morgue: "Christmas in Ashes" |
| Sound, Fiction | Sound, Non-Fiction |
| Jane Tattersall, David McCallum, Steve Medeiros, Martin Lee, Ian Rankin, Claire Dobson, Dale Sheldrake, Yuri Gorbachow, Goro Koyama, Jenna Dalla Riva and Daniel Birch, Vikings: "What Happens in the Cave"; Alan deGraaf, Scott Shepherd, John Elliot, Tyler Whitham, Danielle McBride, Joe Bracciale, Joe Mancuso and Zenon Waschuk, Anne with an E: "The Summit of My Desires"; David McCallum, Jane Tattersall, Barry Gilmore, Claire Dobson, Paul Germann, Christopher King, Martin Lee, Stacy Coutts, Jesse Fellows, Chelsea Body, Sandra Fox and Robert Woolfson, Cardinal: "Lemur"; Janice Ierulli, Matthew Hussey, Clive Turner, Orest Sushko, John Elliot, Steve Copley and Marco Dolle, Frontier: "The House of the Lord"; Rob Hegedus, Kathy Choi, Herwig Gayer, Martin Lee and Jane Tattersall, Schitt's Creek: "Life Is a Cabaret" | Jane Tattersall, Sue Conley, Lou Solakofski, Andy Malcolm and Sandra Fox, The Nature of Things: "Remarkable Rabbits"; Mark Krupka, Lisa Meitin and Ben Doner, The Amazing Race Canada: "Canada Get More Maps"; Bruce Fleming, Jason Milligan, Ian Rodness, Peter Sawade, Jeremy Kessler, Andy Frech and Brad Tigwell, The Corporate Coup d'État; Chris Guglick, Olivia Kolakowski, Joseph Facciuolo, Christine Lebel, David Murray, Lynne Trepanier, Devon Cooke, Gus Harris and Justan Ross, Engraved on a Nation; Mark Vreeken, Phil Hay, Doug McClement, Jeff Kozak and Marc Laliberte, Juno Awards of 2019 |
| Sound, Animation | Visual Effects |
| Richard Spence-Thomas, Kyle Peters, Patton Rodrigues, Ryan Ongaro, Tim Muirhead, Mitch Connors and Luke Dante, PAW Patrol: "Mighty Pups Super Paws: When Super Kitties Attack"; Mike Mancuso, Joe Tetreau, Ryan Eligh, Matt McKenzie and Dante Winkler, Let's Go Luna!: "Amazing Man"; Mike Mancuso, Joe Tetreau, Ryan Eligh, Paul Talbott, Dante Winkler and Eric Mattar-Hurlbut, Supernoobs: "Noob and Improved"; Brian Power, Jeremy Van Slyke, Matt Dawson and Bob Melanson, Trailer Park Boys: The Animated Series: "The Three Mustardteers"; Richard Spence-Thomas, Wild Kratts "The Real Ant Farm" | Dominic Remane, Michael Borrett, Bill Halliday, Tom Morrison, Leann Harvey, Jim Maxwell, Warren Lawtey, Ovidiu Cinazan, Kieran McKay and Maria Gordon, Vikings: "What Happens in the Cave"; Will Garrett, Terry Rose, Joel Skeete, Deji Oduntan, Ryan Moser, Xiang Jiang, Noah Conti, Farhad Hosseinpouri, Liam Campbell and Dan Rojaz, D-Day in 14 Stories; Matthew J.R. Bishop, Michael Griffith, Steve Lowry, Ila Soleimani, Curtis Hsiung, Bruno Tacchino, Aravindan Rajasingham, Kelly MacFarlane, Stephen Curran and Holden Mohring, Dino Dana: "Dino Territory / Prehistoric Predator"; Michael Gibson, Danny McNair, Anthony Patterson, Lara Osland, Andre Miranda, Chris Doe, Rachad Meya, David Bouhs, Jay Stanners and Mohsin Kazi, Killjoys: "Last Dance" |
| Achievement in Hair | Achievement in Casting |
| Annastasia Cucullo and Ana Sorys, Schitt's Creek: "Life Is a Cabaret"; Shirley Bond, Murdoch Mysteries: "One Minute to Murder"; Ashley Nay, Cardinal: "Sam"; Norma Richard, Frontier: "The Low Road"; Zinka Tuminski, Anne with an E: "A Secret Which I Desired to Divine" | Lisa Parasyn and Jon Comerford, Schitt's Creek; Deirdre Bowen, Kim's Convenience; Susan Forrest and Sharon Forrest, Mary Kills People; Stephanie Gorin, Anne with an E; Michael Yerxa and Jesse Storey, The Amazing Race Canada |
Stunt Coordination
Angelica Lisk-Hann and Tally Rodin, Mary Kills People: "No Happy Endings Here"; Randy Butcher, Cardinal: "Helen"; Stéphane Lefebvre and Spencer Birman, Thicker Than Water; Dan Skene, Letterkenny: "In It to Win It"

=== Directing ===
| Direction, Animation | Direction, Children's or Youth |
|---|---|
| Charles E. Bastien, PAW Patrol: "Mighty Pups Super Paws: When Super Kitties Attack"; Stephen Evans and Mateusz Garbulinski, Corner Gas Animated: "Bush League"; Harold Harris, True and the Rainbow Kingdom: "Happy Hearts Day"; Kyran Kelly, Abby Hatcher: "When Abby Met Bozzly"; Chris Kratt, Chris Roy and Louis Champagne, Wild Kratts: "The Real Ant Farm" | Megan Follows, Holly Hobbie: "The Freckled Fugitive"; Stefan Brogren, Holly Hobbie: "The Birthday Basher"; J. J. Johnson, Dino Dana: "Dino Zone"; Gloria Ui Young Kim and Sharon Lewis, It's My Party!: "Winter Solstice"; Bruce McDonald, Creeped Out: "The Unfortunate Five" |
| Direction, Comedy | Direction, Documentary Series |
| Jacob Tierney, Letterkenny: "Yew!"; Jordan Canning, Schitt's Creek: "Meet the Parents"; Dan Levy and Andrew Cividino, Schitt's Creek: "Life Is a Cabaret"; Laurie Lynd, Schitt's Creek: "The Crowening"; Catherine Reitman, Workin' Moms: "Birth Daze" | Juliet Lammers and Lorraine Price, Engraved on a Nation; Michelle Mama, In the Making: "Christopher House"; Kevin McMahon and Matt Gallagher, Equator: A New World View: "Heatwave"; Brian Rice, History Erased: "United Kingdom"; Mark Stevenson, Hitler's Most Wanted: "Benito Mussolini" |
| Direction, Documentary Program | Direction, Drama Series |
| Mike Downie, Finding the Secret Path; Robin Bicknell, The Nature of Things: "The Genetic Revolution"; Ric Esther Bienstock and Yaron Niski, The Good Nazi; Matthew Shoychet, The Accountant of Auschwitz; Caroline Underwood, The Nature of Things: "Turtle Beach" | Norma Bailey, Mary Kills People: "The Key to Faith"; Helen Shaver, Vikings: "Baldur"; Amanda Tapping, Anne with an E: "Great and Sudden Change"; David Wellington, Vikings: "Ragnarok"; Anne Wheeler, Anne with an E: "A Secret Which I Desired to Divine" |
| Direction, Factual | Direction, Lifestyle or Information |
| Jennifer Podemski, Future History: "Awaken/Goshkoziwin"; Sebastian Cluer, Still Standing: "Siksika Nation"; Graeme Lynch, Employable Me: "Elias & Yang"; Jeff Newman and Randy Frykas, First Contact: "Changing the Lens"; Matt Shewchuk and Tyson Hepburn, Rust Valley Restorers: "Go Big Or Go Home" | Shelagh O'Brien, 2018 Scotiabank Giller Prize; Don Cook and Cheryl Zalameda, Island of Bryan: "Setting the Bar"; John Keffer, The Marilyn Denis Show: "Marilyn's Pride Party"; Frank Samson, Home to Win: "Home for the Holidays"; Jacob Ulrich and Jennifer Horvath, Carnival Eats: "Hawaii Fried Dough" |
| Direction, Live Sports Event | Direction, Reality/Competition |
| Chris Phillips, 2019 NBA Eastern Conference Semifinals: "Raptors vs 76ers Game 7"; Andy Bouyoukas, 106th Grey Cup; Chris Elias, 2018–19 Grand Prix of Figure Skating Final | Mike Bickerton, Blown Away: "Clash of the Robots"; Graeme Lynch, 50 Ways to Kill Your Mum: "Jaleel and Gail"; Dave Russell, The Great Canadian Baking Show: "Finale"; Dave Russell, Iron Chef Canada: "Battle Offal"; Kyle Whitelaw, Knock Knock Ghost: "HMCS Haida" |
| Direction, Variety or Sketch Comedy | Direction, TV Movie |
| Jordan Canning and Aleysa Young, Baroness von Sketch Show: "Humanity Is in an Awkward Stage"; John Keffer, Canada's Walk of Fame 2018; Shelagh O'Brien, 7th Canadian Screen Awards; Shelagh O'Brien, Trevor Noah @ JFL, Volume II; Henry Sarwer-Foner, The Beaverton: "Episode 307" | Gail Harvey, No One Would Tell; Jim Donovan, Believe Me: The Abduction of Lisa McVey; David Hackl, Daughter of the Wolf; Michael Kennedy, #Roxy; Caroline Labrèche, Thicker Than Water |

=== Music ===
| Original Music, Fiction | Original Music, Non-Fiction |
|---|---|
| Amin Bhatia and Ari Posner, Anne with an E: "The Summit of My Desires"; Todor Kobakov, Cardinal: "Mama"; Ian LeFeuvre and Ari Posner, Carter: "Harley Gets Replaced"; Tom Third, Coroner: "Black Dog"; Trevor Morris, Vikings: "Hell" | Ken Myhr, The Accountant of Auschwitz; Michelle Osis, The Corporate Coup d'État; Ohad Benchetrit and Justin Small, The Nature of Things: "A Day in the Life of Earth"; Ohad Benchetrit and Justin Small, The Nature of Things: "Remarkable Rabbits"; Todor Kobakov, The Guardians |
| Original Music, Animation | |
Brian Pickett, Graeme Cornies, James Chapple and David Kelly, PAW Patrol: "Mighty Pups Super Paws: When Super Kitties Attack"; Ryan Carlson and Brendan Quinn, Abby Hatcher, "Peepertime Blues"; Brian Pickett, Graeme Cornies, James Chapple and David Kelly, The Daniel Tiger Movie: Won't You Be Our Neighbour?; Amin Bhatia, Chris Tait, Ari Posner and Kris Kuzdak, Let's Go Luna!: "Bob the Plant"; Asher Lenz and Stephen Skratt, Rusty Rivets: "Secret Agent Rusty / Moon Walkin' Rusty"

=== Writing ===
| Writing, Animation | Writing, Children's or Youth |
|---|---|
| Diana Frances, Corner Gas Animated: "Hedge Your Debts"; Alex Ganetakos, Go Away, Unicorn!: "Claus Out, Unicorn"; Evan Thaler Hickey, Go Away, Unicorn!: "You Rule, Unicorn"; Kate Hewlett, Corner Gas Animated: "Doctors Without Boarders"; Mike Smith, John Paul Tremblay, Robb Wells, Norm Hiscock and Michael Rowe, Trailer Park Boys: The Animated Series: "The Three Mustardteers" | Christin Simms, Amish Patel and J. J. Johnson, Dino Dana: "Dino Prints"; Kate Hewlett, Backstage: "Not for Sale"; Vivian Lin, Bajillionaires: "Good Whale Hunting"; Sarah Glinski, Holly Hobbie: "The Mad Muralist"; Cole Bastedo, Holly Hobbie: "The Rabble Rouser" |
| Writing, Comedy | Writing, Documentary |
| Jared Keeso and Jacob Tierney, Letterkenny: "Yew!"; Rupinder Gill, Schitt's Creek: "The Hospies"; Dan Levy, Schitt's Creek: "Meet the Parents"; Dan Levy and Rupinder Gill, Schitt's Creek: "Housewarming"; David West Read, Schitt's Creek: "Love Letters" | Alison Duke and Ngardy Conteh George, Mr. Jane and Finch; Julia Nunes, The Nature of Things: "The Genetic Revolution"; Nadine Pequeneza, The Invisible Heart; Leslea Mair and Leif Kaldor, The Nature of Things: "Something in the Air"; Marc Chiasson and Clare Bambrough, Women Should Vote: A Short History of How Women Won the Franchise in Ontario |
| Writing, Drama Series | Writing, Factual |
| Patrick Tarr, Noelle Carbone and Aaron Bala, Cardinal: "Mama"; Tassie Cameron, Mary Kills People: "The Key to Faith"; Marsha Greene, Mary Kills People: "A Goddamned Saint"; Jane Maggs, Anne with an E: "There is Something at Work in My Soul Which I Do Not Understand"; Moira Walley-Beckett, Anne with an E: "A Secret Which I Desired to Divine" | Jonny Harris, Fraser Young, Graham Chittenden and Steve Dylan, Still Standing: "Churchill"; Al Kratina, Eric Sabbag and Alain Zaloum, The Detectives: "Jackie"; Tamara Podemski, Future History: "Awaken/Goshkoziwin"; Edi Osghian and Todd Serotiuk, Heavy Rescue: 401: "There Is Nothing Else"; Mark Johnston, Political Blind Date: "Indigenous Rights" |
| Writing, Lifestyle or Reality/Competition | Writing, TV Movie |
| Mark Lysakowski, Mark Peacock and Rob Brunner, The Amazing Race Canada: "Canada Get More Maps"; Tracie Tighe, Yette Vandendam and Molly Middleton, Dragons' Den: "Next Level Special"; Elvira Kurt, Iron Chef Canada: "Battle Stonefruit"; Seta Kalousdian-Tanner, The Marilyn Denis Show: "Marilyn's Pride Party"; Eric Abboud and Jon Sufrin, Top Chef Canada: "The Contenders" | Christina Welsh, Believe Me: The Abduction of Lisa McVey; Barbara Kymlicka, Mean Queen; Paolo Mancini and Thomas Michael, Nowhere to Be Found; David Elver and Andrea Stevens, Thicker Than Water |
| Writing, Variety or Sketch Comedy | |
| Carolyn Taylor, Meredith MacNeill, Aurora Browne, Jennifer Whalen, Jennifer Goodhue, Allison Hogg, Becky Johnson, Moynan King and DJ Mausner, Baroness von Sketch Show: "Humanity is in an Awkward Stage"; Jeff Detsky, Michael Balazo, Luke Gordon Field, Jocelyn Geddie, Brandon Hackett, Emma Hunter, Jen MacIntyre, Megan MacKay, Scott Montgomery, Miguel Rivas, Alexander Saxton, Jacob Duarte Spiel, Winter Tekenos-Levy and Callum Wratten, The Beaverton: "Episode 304"; Jeff Detsky, Michael Balazo, Luke Gordon Field, Jocelyn Geddie, Brandon Hackett, Emma Hunter, Megan MacKay, Scott Montgomery, Allana Reoch, Miguel Rivas, Alexander Saxton, Jacob Duarte Spiel, Winter Tekenos-Levy and Callum Wratten, The Beaverton: "Episode 307"; Monica Heisey, Aisha Brown, Diana Frances and Zoe Whittall, 7th Canadian Screen Awards; Guled Abdi, Vance Banzo, Tim Blair, Franco Nguyen, Adam Bovoletis and Luc Mandl, TallBoyz: "What's It Gonna Be, Boys?" | |

== Digital media ==
| Web Program or Series, Fiction | Web Program or Series, Non-Fiction |
|---|---|
| Save Me — Fabrizio Filippo, Jonas Diamond, Lisa Baylin; The 410 — Matt Power, Supinder Wraich; Detention Adventure — Lauren Corber, Ryan West, Joe Kicak, Carmen Albano, Karen Moore; How to Buy a Baby — Lauren Corber, Wendy Litner; Ming's Dynasty — Antony Hall, Calwyn Shurgold, Julian De Zotti, Kevin Saffer, Mike Peterson | Canada's a Drag — Peter Knegt, Mercedes Grundy, Andrew D'Cruz, Romeo Candido; Art Hurts — Lise Hosein, Romeo Candido, Andrew D'Cruz; Canadiana — Kyle Cucco, Ashley Brook, Adam Bunch, Josef Beeby; Fast Horse — Niobe Thompson; Painkiller: Inside the Opioid Crisis — Mathew Embry, Ravinder Minhas, Juggy Sihota, Blair Miller, Kim Hsu Guise, Jonas Woost, Holly Dupej, Christina Willings; True Dating Stories — Andy King, Tinu Sinha, Matt King, Andrew Ferguson, Tyler Metcalf, Juliet Paperny |
| Lead Performance, Web Program or Series | Supporting Performance, Web Program or Series |
| Emily Hampshire, Save Me; Marc Bendavid, How to Buy a Baby; Sara Canning, Hospital Show; Rodrigo Fernandez-Stoll, Save Me; Amy Matysio, Running with Violet; Michelle Morgan, Deep Six; Connie Wang, Tokens; Supinder Wraich, The 410 | Emma Hunter, How to Buy a Baby; Andrea Bang, Running with Violet; Julian De Zotti, Ming's Dynasty; Rodrigo Fernandez-Stoll, How to Buy a Baby; Jessica Greco, Tokens; Adam Greydon Reid, Hospital Show; Amy Matysio, Save Me; Julian Richings, Talent Drivers |
| Production, Interactive | Host, Web Program or Series |
| Super Queeroes — Peter Knegt, Mercedes Grundy, Oliver Skinner, Reiko Milley, Eleanor Knowles, Jeff Hume, Lucius Dechausay, Kiah Welsh, Jonathan Busch, Allison Cake, Andrew D'Cruz; Clit Me — Hugues Sweeney, Noémie Beaulac, Stéphanie Dupuis, Maude Fraser-Jodoin, Laurence Gélinas, Audrey Malo, Léa Martin, Vincent Paradis, Catherine Sabourin; Kenk: The Interactive Graphic Novel — Alex Jansen, Richard Poplak, Jason Gilmore, Nick Marinkovich, Adam Putter, Janis Mussat, Grace Sainsbury; Un/Tied Shoes — Evie Ruddy, Tracey Lebedovich, Nicholas Klassen | Melissa Grelo, Bell Let's Talk; Danielle Graham and Elaine Lui, eTalk Live from the Oscars Balcony; Vassy Kapelos, CBC Explains: Canada Votes; Scott McGillivray, Scott's House Calls; Graeme O'Neil and Carlos Bustamante, ET Canada Live |
| Direction, Web Program or Series | Writing, Web Program or Series |
| Winnifred Jong, Tokens; Allison Johnston, True Dating Stories; Adriana Maggs, How to Buy a Baby; Sheona McDonald, A Short Essay on Men; Jonathan Torrens, Your Two Cents | Wendy Litner, How to Buy a Baby; Fab Filippo, Save Me; Winnifred Jong, Tokens; Karen Moore, Detention Adventure; Supinder Wraich, The 410 |
| Immersive Experience, Fiction | Immersive Experience, Non-Fiction |
| Gymnasia — Chris Lavis, Maciek Szczerbowski, Félix Lajeunesse, Paul Raphael, Dana Dansereau, Loc Dao, Rob McLaughlin, Stephane Rituit, Patrick Watson; Afterlife — Luisa Valencia; Glacial Reality — Jean-François Dugal | Traveling While Black — Roger Ross Williams, Félix Lajeunesse, Paul Raphael, Ayesha Nadarajah, Stephane Rituit, Bonnie Nelson Schwartz, Ryan Horrigan, Jihan Robinson, Lina Srivastava, Sebastian Sylwan; Anthropocene VR — Nicholas de Pencier, Jennifer Baichwal, Edward Burtynsky; Dino Quest — J. J. Johnson, Blair Powers, Ronald Ruslim, Gavin Friesen, Alex Bethke, Kevin Gan, Mark Cautillo, Javier Plana, Sarah Imsirek, Alex Gordon, Sean Hamilton, Leisha-Marie Riddel, Britney Coates, Jason Lean, Adriano Bertuzzo, Christopher Coey, Geordie Telfe; They Should Be Flowers — Karen Chapman |
| Video Game Narrative | Live Production, Social Media |
| East of the Rockies — Joy Kogawa, Rob McLaughlin, Jason Legge, Dirk van Ginkel; Lightbearer — Alex Epstein, Mark Slutsky, Lisa Hunter; Roger & James in They Came from Below — Alex Epstein, Lisa Hunter, Mark Slutsky | Power & Politics — Vassy Kapelos, Amy Castle, Sara Brunetti, Natasha Ramnarine, Tyler Buist, Eric Grenier, Nicole Riva; The Amazing Race Canada: Live from the Starting Line — Kyle Joe, Chris Perez, Cherylann Nesbitt, Jen McLarty, Hilary Allan, Kayla Grey; Bell Let's Talk Live — Chris Perez, Sush Rao, Beth Maher, Sandy Lok; eTalk Live from the Oscars Balcony — Chris Perez, Michelle Crespi, Beth Maher, Danielle Graham, Elaine Lui, Devin Mandeville; International Women's Day — Karen Sebesta, Monika Platek, Tanya Casole-Gouveia, Liana Bristol |
