= Underpass Park =

Public space in Toronto, Canada

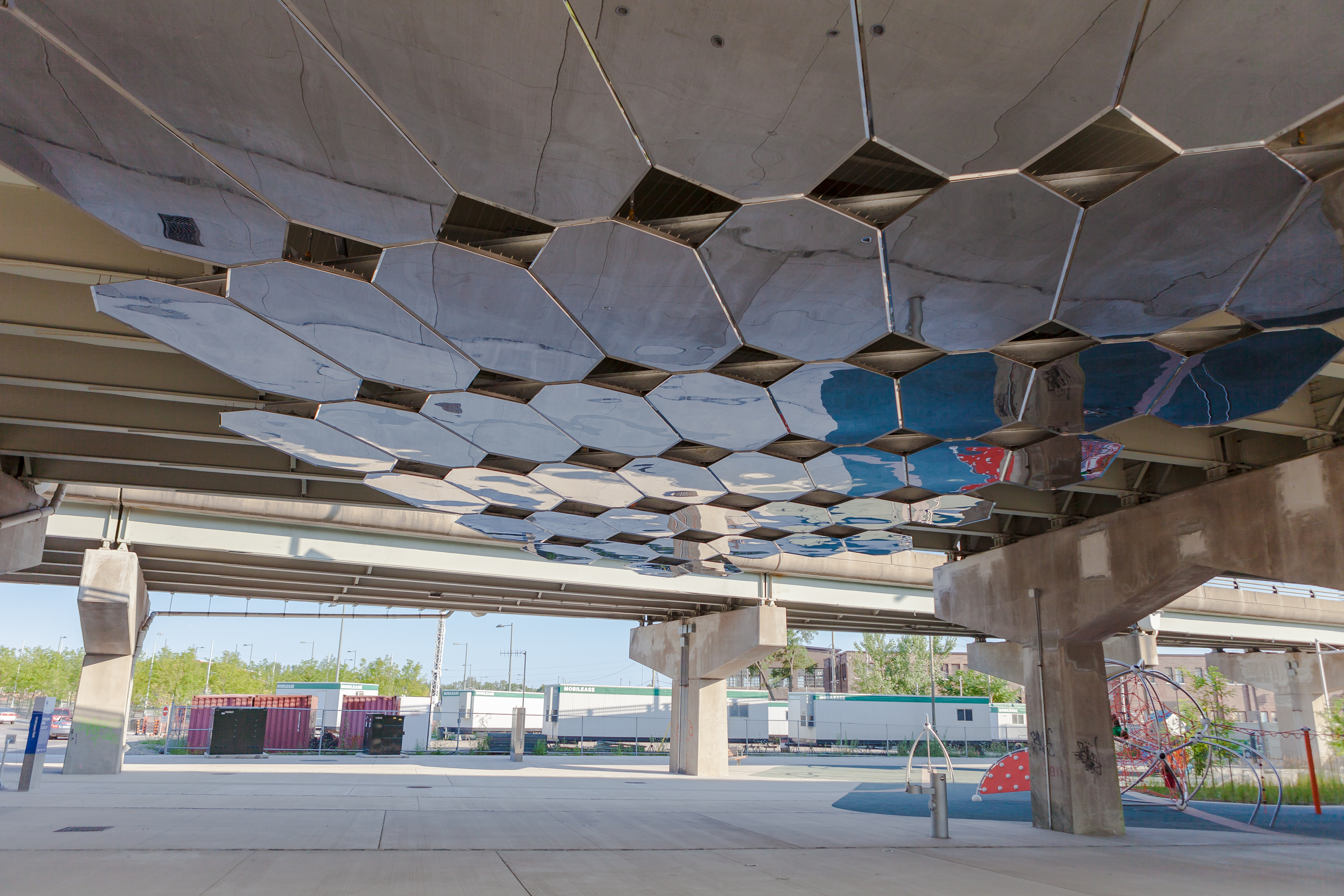
- Interactive map of Underpass Park
- Type: Urban community park
- Location: Toronto
- Coordinates: 43°39′21″N 79°21′17″W
- Created: 2012
- Operator: Toronto Parks, Forestry & Recreation
- Website: Official website

Underpass Park is a public space designed by PFS Studio and The Planning Partnership located beneath the overpasses of Adelaide Street, Eastern Avenue, and Richmond Street in the West Don Lands neighbourhood of Toronto. The first phase of the development features a playground, basketball courts, and skate park, and was officially opened by Toronto Mayor Rob Ford on August 2, 2012. The park is an initiative of Waterfront Toronto, and is the 18th public space that the group has built or revitalized since 2005 in the Toronto waterfront district. The initial phase of Underpass Park cost approximately $6 million, paid for mostly by Government of Canada. A second phase, cost $3.5 million, opened in the spring of 2013.

Among the artists featured are an Indigenous street mural by Chief Lady Bird, Mo Thunder, and Christopher Ross among others.

== See also ==
- Kwun Tong Promenade
