= Happy Face (film) =

- Directed by: Alexandre Franchi
- Written by: Joëlle Bourjolly; Alexandre Franchi
- Produced by: Alexandre Franchi; Stéphane Gérin-Lajoie
- Starring: Robin L'Houmeau; Debbie Lynch-White; Alison Midstokke; Keith Widgington
- Cinematography: Claudine Sauvé
- Edited by: Hubert Hayaud; Amélie Labrèche
- Production companies: Les Films de la Mancha; Line & Content
- Distributed by: Maison 4:3
- Release date: October 6, 2018 (FNC)
- Running time: 100 minutes
- Country: Canada
- Language: English

Happy Face is a Canadian drama film, directed by Alexandre Franchi and released in 2018. The film stars Robin L'Houmeau as Stan, a young man from Montreal who tries to cope with his mother's cancer treatment, which has disfigured her appearance, by disguising himself with bandages and joining a support group for people with disfiguring facial conditions in the hopes of better understanding her situation. Debbie Lynch-White plays Vanessa, the nurse who leads the support group, while the members of the support group are portrayed by real people with facial disabilities, including motivational speaker David Roche and actress and model Alison Midstokke.

The film premiered in October 2018 at the Festival du nouveau cinéma, before going into limited theatrical release the following month. It had its American premiere at the Slamdance Film Festival in 2019.

The film won the Prix collégial du cinéma québécois in 2019. Midstokke received a Canadian Screen Award nomination for Best Supporting Actress at the 8th Canadian Screen Awards in 2020.
