= Jeff Sackman =

American executive producer

Jeff Jackman
- Born: United States
- Occupation: Film producer
- Notable work: American Psycho

Jeff Sackman is an American film producer credited for over 100 films and is the co-founder of Quiver Distribution with partner Berry Meyerowitz and currently serves as chairman of Hollywood Suite. Sackman founded and served as president and CEO of ThinkFilm and served as the first president of Lionsgate Films.

== Education and career ==
Sackman completed his Bachelor of Commerce at McGill University and his MBA from Syracuse University in the early 1980s.

Sackman was executive vice president of distribution company Cinepix Film Properties. In 1998, Cinepix Film Properties merged with distribution firm Lion's Gate Films. When Sackman was president, Lionsgate Films moved into the United States, which marked a revenue shift. After leaving Lions Gate Films, Sackman founded US independent studio ThinkFilm in September 2001 to provide support for the independent film industry, serving as both president and CEO. In a Globe and Mail interview, Jeff Sackman spoke about a lack of independent film support, saying "We intend to remedy that situation", and explained that ThinkFilm would concentrate on distribution opportunities, including direct-to-video, television and executive producing. ThinkFilm became known for films like “Born into Brothels” and “Half Nelson,” with a library of 235 films in its tenure. After ThinkFilm's Sale in 2006, Sackman subsequently ran Tajj Media Services for a decade, consulting, producing, and executive producing in the television and film industry.

In 2011, Sackman co-founded Toronto-based company, Hollywood Suite. In 2019, Jeff Sackman and Berry Meyerowitz launched Quiver Distribution with plans to acquire, market and exploit films across all platforms in the U.S. and Canada.

== Accolades ==
The Accountant of Auschwitz, produced by Sackman, was winner of four Canadian Screen Awards at the 8th Canadian Screen Awards in 2020. Best History Documentary Program or Series, Best Editorial Research, Best Visual Research, and Best Music in a Non-Fiction Program or Series.

== Selected filmography ==
| Year | Film | Notes |
|---|---|---|
| 2023 | Irena's Vow | Executive producer |
| 2023 | The Collective | Executive producer |
| 2023 | Fear the Night | Producer |
| 2020 | Becky | Executive producer |
| 2013 | The Grand Seduction | Executive producer |
| 2005 | Murderball | Executive producer |
| 2000 | American Psycho | Executive producer |
