= Ravina Gardens =

Ice hockey arena

Coordinates: 43°39′34.83″N 79°28′24.02″W

Ravina Gardens was an ice hockey arena located in Toronto, Ontario, Canada. It supported amateur hockey from before World War I until 1991, and professional hockey briefly in the 1920s. The location of the demolished arena is parkland and is known as Ravina Gardens. It was located at the foot of Rowland Street, southeast of Annette Street and Evelyn Avenue in West Toronto Junction.

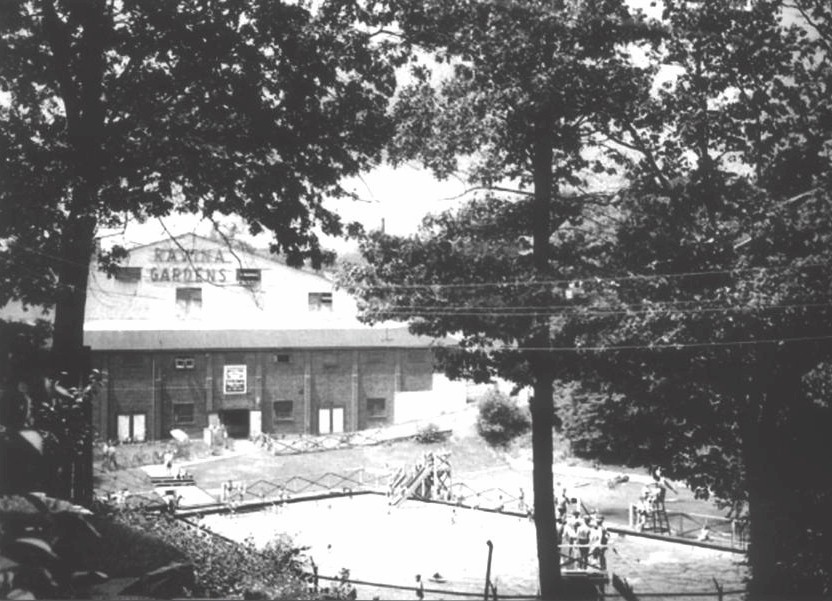
Ravina Gardens Arena and Pool as seen from Evelyn Crescent

== History ==
Ravina Gardens started as the outdoor Ravina Rink before World War I. The area was originally the village of West Toronto Junction. It was remodelled to hold 4,500 seats in 1912. The arena was the site of numerous ice hockey leagues and was the training facility of professional teams. In 1926, a new arena, named "Ravina Gardens" with an artificial ice surface was built on the site.

In 1926, the first training camp of the New York Rangers was held there, supervised by Conn Smythe, who lived nearby. In 1927, it hosted the games of the Toronto Ravinas minor professional hockey club. The arena was in use until the 1950s by the Humber Valley Hockey League's Hornets and Redmen. It was demolished in 1961 after groundwater in the ravine damaged the structure.

== Ravina Gardens park ==
The site is now parkland (two baseball diamonds). It is used as green space for three nearby schools: Annette Public, High Park Alternative School, and St. Cecilia's Catholic. In 2016, Indigenous artists Chippewar, Aura, Chief Lady Bird, Mitch Hol and Evan Lovett created a 90-foot mural featuring an owl and a Thunderbird.
