= Invisible Essence: The Little Prince =

- Directed by: Charles Officer
- Written by: Charles Officer
- Produced by: Stuart Henderson; Jake Yanowski
- Cinematography: Alexandre Lampron
- Edited by: Bruce Lapointe
- Music by: Kevin Lau
- Production companies: 90th Parallel Film and Television Productions; Canesugar Filmworks
- Distributed by: The Orchard
- Release date: October 16, 2018
- Running time: 90 minutes
- Country: Canada
- Language: English

Invisible Essence: The Little Prince is a 2018 Canadian documentary film, directed by Charles Officer. The film profiles and explores the enduring cultural impact of Antoine de Saint-Exupéry's influential novel The Little Prince.

The film premiered in Los Angeles, California in October 2018, before going into Canadian commercial release in 2019.

The film received two Canadian Screen Award nominations at the 8th Canadian Screen Awards in 2020, for Best Feature Length Documentary and Best Editing in a Documentary (Bruce Lapointe).
