= Alison Midstokke =

American actress

- Born: San Mateo California
- Occupation: Actress
- Notable work: Happy Face

Alison Midstokke is an American actress and activist. She is most noted for her performance in the 2018 film Happy Face, for which she received a Canadian Screen Award nomination for Best Supporting Actress at the 8th Canadian Screen Awards in 2020. She also won the award for Best Actress at the 2019 FearNYC Festival.

Midstokke was born with Treacher Collins syndrome, a congenital condition which affects the development of the face. In addition to her acting work, she has worked as a model with different artists and photographers, and has served on the boards of various organizations for people with facial differences.
