= Ming's Dynasty =

Canadian comedy web series

Ming's Dynasty is a Canadian comedy web series, which premiered on CBC Gem in 2019. The series stars Calwyn Shurgold and Antony Hall as "White Wyne" and "Young Riesling", aspiring rappers from Toronto who move back to Riesling's hometown of Coaldale, Alberta to help run his family's Chinese restaurant after his father's stroke, but still dream of making it big in the music industry.

The cast also includes Julian De Zotti and Andrew Phung. De Zotti was a cocreator of the series along with Hall and Shurgold.

The show received two Canadian Screen Award nominations at the 8th Canadian Screen Awards in 2020, for Best Original Web Program or Series, Fiction and Best Supporting Performance in a Program or Series Produced for Digital Media (De Zotti).
