= The Accountant of Auschwitz =

2018 film

- Film poster
- Directed by: Matthew Shoychet
- Written by: Ricki Gurwitz
- Produced by: Ric Esther Bienstock; Ricki Gurwitz; Jeff Sackman (Executive Producer); Berry Meyerowitz (Executive Producer)
- Cinematography: Luke McCutcheon
- Edited by: Ted Husband
- Music by: Ken Myhr
- Production companies: Good Soup Productions; TLNT Productions
- Distributed by: Aqute Media
- Release date: April 29, 2018 (Hot Docs)
- Running time: 78 minutes
- Country: Canada
- Language: English

The Accountant of Auschwitz is a Canadian documentary film, produced by Ricki Gurwitz and Ric Esther Bienstock and directed by Matthew Shoychet. The film centres on lawyer Thomas Walther's prosecution in the 2010s of former Schutzstaffel member Oskar Gröning, focusing in part on the ethical debate around whether there's any useful purpose to be served in prosecuting an elderly man for crimes he committed 60 years earlier.

The film premiered at the Hot Docs Canadian International Documentary Festival in 2018, and later had a brief theatrical run before airing on Documentary Channel and Netflix.

The film won four Canadian Screen Awards at the 8th Canadian Screen Awards in 2020, for Best History Documentary Program or Series, Best Editorial Research (Ricki Gurwitz), Best Visual Research (Ricki Gurwitz), and Best Music in a Non-Fiction Program or Series (Ken Myhr). It was also nominated, but did not win, for Best Editing in a Documentary Program or Series (Ted Husband) and Best Direction in a Documentary Program (Shoychet).

== Production ==
The film was executive produced by Jeff Sackman, Berry Meyerowitz, Sari Stitt, Shael Rosenbaum, Jordan Nahmias, and Randi Kishenbaum. Producers were Ric Esther Bienstock and Ricki Gurwitz.
