= List of most watched Canadian television broadcasts of 2019 =

The following is a list of most watched Canadian television broadcasts of 2019 according to Numeris.

== Most watched by week ==
English (National)
Week of	Title	Network	Viewers (in millions)	Ref.
January 7	Young Sheldon	CTV	2.62	
January 14	The Big Bang Theory	CTV	3.43	
January 21	The Good Doctor	CTV	2.77	
January 28	Super Bowl LIII	CTV	4.35	
February 4	The Big Bang Theory	CTV	3.65	
February 11	NCIS	Global	2.29	
February 18	91st Academy Awards	CTV	5.21	
February 25	The Good Doctor	CTV	2.76	
March 4	The Big Bang Theory	CTV	3.15	
March 11	The Good Doctor	CTV	2.79	
March 18	9-1-1	Global	2.23	
March 25	9-1-1	Global	2.07	
April 1	The Big Bang Theory	CTV	3.48	
April 8	NCIS	Global	2.17	
April 15	The Big Bang Theory	CTV	3.21	
April 22	The Big Bang Theory	CTV	3.21	
April 29	The Big Bang Theory	CTV	3.38	
May 6	The Big Bang Theory	CTV	3.80	
May 13	The Big Bang Theory	CTV	5.77	
May 20	NBA Eastern Conference Final, Game 6	Sportsnet One	2.57	
May 27	NBA Finals, Game 2	TSN	3.20	
June 3	NBA Finals, Game 4	TSN	3.49	
June 10	NBA Finals, Game 6	TSN / CTV	7.43	
June 17	The Amazing Race	CTV	1.62	
June 24	The Amazing Race	CTV	1.51	
July 1	The Amazing Race Canada	CTV	2.03	
July 8	The Amazing Race Canada	CTV	1.75	
July 15	The Amazing Race Canada	CTV	1.89	
July 22	The Amazing Race Canada	CTV	1.80	
July 29	The Amazing Race Canada	CTV	1.78	
August 5	The Amazing Race Canada	CTV	1.91	
August 12	The Amazing Race Canada	CTV	2.12	
August 19	The Amazing Race Canada	CTV	2.07	
August 26	The Amazing Race Canada	CTV	2.02	
September 2	The Amazing Race Canada	CTV	1.86	
September 9	The Amazing Race Canada	CTV	2.13	

French (Quebec)
Week of	Title	Network	Viewers (in millions)	Ref.
January 7	District 31	SRC	1.63	
January 14	District 31	SRC	1.59	
January 21	District 31	SRC	1.72	
January 28	District 31	SRC	1.76	
February 4	La Voix	TVA	2.21	
February 11	La Voix	TVA	1.98	
February 18	La Voix	TVA	1.93	
February 25	La Voix	TVA	2.09	
March 4	La Voix	TVA	2.03	
March 11	La Voix	TVA	1.95	
March 18	La Voix	TVA	1.83	
March 25	La Voix	TVA	1.83	
April 1	La Voix	TVA	1.98	
