= Where to I Do? =

Where to I Do? is a Canadian reality television series, which premiered on Gusto in 2018. Hosted by designer Tommy Smythe, the series features Smythe helping engaged couples to select their ideal wedding venue.

The series was a Canadian Screen Award nominee for Best Lifestyle Series at the 7th Canadian Screen Awards in 2019 and the 8th Canadian Screen Awards in 2020.
