= The 410 =

Canadian drama web series

The 410 is a Canadian drama web series, which premiered on CBC Gem on May 2, 2019. Created by and starring Supinder Wraich, the series centres on Suri, a young Indo-Canadian woman who is drawn into a life of crime after her truck driver father Sahib Rana is arrested for smuggling cocaine.

The series is set in the Indo-Canadian community of Brampton, Ontario, and is named for the city's Highway 410. It was inspired by real-life news stories about Indo-Canadian truck drivers being arrested for drug smuggling, and Wraich created the series because as an Indo-Canadian woman she rarely gets the opportunity to play complex characters who fall short of the idealized image of a stereotypical Asian overachiever.

The series consists of three half-hour episodes, directed by Renuka Jeyapalan.

The series received a Canadian Screen Award nomination for Best Original Web Program or Series, Fiction at the 8th Canadian Screen Awards in 2020.
