= Mo Thunder =

Indigenous artist in Canada

- Education: Fanshawe College, University of Lethbridge
- Known for: Murals, Interdisciplinary Art
- Website: https://mo-thunder.com/

Mo Thunder is a Haudenosaunee (Oneida Nation of the Thames), Anishinaabe (Aamjiwnaang First Nation) and French Canadian artist and activist. They live and practice in Toronto, Ontario. Mo formerly went by the artist alias Aura Last. They are known for their mural works and prints, which are found around the City of Toronto. Their work is inspired by family, intergenerational connections and memory. Their work often reinterprets Indigenous pedagogies through an artistic lens and has been noted as illustrative of Indigenous Education for teachers.

Mo is an artist in the Indigenous art sector of Toronto and Canada. Their work is widely seen in many locations and their work has also been exhibited in galleries and museums across Canada. Their work has been covered in media outlets in the art and scholarly community, including by Toronto Metropolitan University, Future Pathways, Artworx.to and Art Windsor.

== Career ==
Mo Thunder is well known for their murals, though they work in multiple media and are a multidisciplinary artist. They hold a BFA in studio art from Fanshawe College and the University of Lethbridge, though they note that they are also self and community taught. Much of their work focuses on youth advocacy and leadership, especially working with Indigenous and 2SLGBTQIA+ young people, notably the Earth Sky Collective.

Their work can be found all over Toronto, including in Underpass Park, University of Toronto Scarborough Campus, Leslieville, Toronto Metropolitan University, Gladstone Hotel, and the Scadding Court Community Pool.

They have also been interviewed or had their work featured in various media outlets and festivals, including the CBC, the Luminato Festival, Scarborough Arts and Daily Hive.

In 2020, they were featured in an episode of Future History, produced by Sarain Fox, which featured their work as a main focal point of Indigenous organizing in Toronto.

== Awards ==
Year	Award name	Nomination Status
2024	Exhibition of the Year Budget over $20,000 Thematic (Galleries Ontario Galleries)	Awarded
2024	Ontario Arts Council Indigenous Arts Award (Emerging Artist)	Awarded
