= Chief Lady Bird =

Chippewa and Potawatomi artist

- Born: Nancy King; 1993 (age 32–33)
- Education: OCAD University
- Known for: Artist, Illustrator, Activist
- Style: Woodlands school
- Website: instagram.com/chiefladybird

Chief Lady Bird (also known as Nancy King) is a Chippewa and Potawatomi artist, illustrator, educator and community activist from Rama First Nation and Moosedeer Point First Nation, who currently resides in Toronto, Ontario. Chief Lady Bird (Ogimaakwebnes) is her spirit name, which she uses professionally as an artist. Her art is focused on foregrounding the experiences of Indigenous women.

== Career ==
Chief Lady Bird is known for her collaborative murals, digital illustrations, children's book illustrations, and contributions of Indigenous art to local spaces in Toronto. Her work can be found around Toronto including murals on Queen Street West, Beverley and D'Arcy Street, Ravina Gardens, Withrow Public School, Ryerson University and Underpass Park under the Don Valley Parkway.

Chief Lady Bird created the Turtle Island emoji for Twitter on National Indigenous Peoples Day. She is "part of an informal digital network of activists, organizing their social media communities around Indigenous issues".

In 2019, Chief Lady Bird illustrated the children's book Nibi's Water Song, written by Sunshine Tenasco and published by Scholastic Canada. This book features her dog Ludo as a character. A review of the book in Quill & Quire called Chief Lady Bird's work "colourful and expressive". Chief Lady Bird's work has been featured in Chirp Magazine. Her work was also featured on the cover of the United Kingdom release for The Marrow Thieves by Cherie Dimaline. In addition to this, Chief Lady Bird's work has appeared in solo or group exhibitions at Twist Gallery, the Gladstone Hotel, Gallery of Northumberland, Arts Square, the Lieutenant Governor's Suite, Yorkville Village, Super Wonder Gallery, the Carlu, Harbourfront Centre, Summer in the City Gallery and the Woodland Cultural Centre. Her mural The South | Zhaawanong was commissioned by the Art Gallery of Ontario and installed in the gallery's Robert Harding Hall in June 2023.

== Education ==
Chief Lady Bird holds a Bachelor of Fine Arts from OCAD University, where she studied drawing and painting and minored in Indigenous Visual Culture. She notes that "my art practice was about bringing experience from my major into my minor and vice versa."

== Awards and nominations ==
Year	Award name	Nomination Status
27 April 2017	Leading Women Building Communities Recognition Award	Awarded
18 May 2016	Ontario Arts Council Aboriginal Arts Award	Nominated
9 January 2014	Indspire Undergraduate Fine Arts Award	Awarded
