= To the Worlds =

2019 Canadian TV film by Wendy Ord

To the Worlds is a Canadian television documentary film, which aired January 18, 2019 on CBC Television. Directed by Wendy Ord, the film profiles a group of older women from Kelowna, British Columbia, who came together as a figure skating team with the goal of participating in the International Skating Union's 2018 adult figure skating competition in Oberstdorf, Germany.

The film was broadcast on January 18, 2019 on CBC Docs POV. John Doyle of The Globe and Mail praised the film, writing that "it's a simple story, universal in appeal and it has been told before as fiction. Variations on the story can be seen in the British movies Calendar Girls and Made in Dagenham: women decide they have been classified by others as weak, demure, old, and decide to rebel, proving something to themselves as much as to others. And there are many sports movies about that improbable season or improbable victory - usually by a group of misfits - who triumph over adversity in a crunch game at the end of the season. Here, however, it is all very real, genuinely anchored in the Canada we know. "Imagine Skate Canada meets The Real Housewives" is CBC's description but that's just silly. There is no false and implausible emoting here. It's just people."

The film won the Canadian Screen Award for Best Documentary Program at the 8th Canadian Screen Awards in 2020.
