= Jay Switzer =

Canadian television executive (1956–2018)

Jay Switzer CM (July 11, 1956 – January 29, 2018) was a Canadian television executive, most noted as a longtime senior executive of CHUM Limited.

Born in Calgary, Alberta and raised in Lethbridge, he was the son of broadcast executives Israel Switzer and Phyllis Switzer. He had his first job in broadcasting as a weekend switchboard operator for Citytv, and then worked as a cable installer for Maclean-Hunter, a director of television pilots and a research analyst for the Financial Post. He attained an MBA from the University of Western Ontario's Ivey Business School, before rejoining Citytv as director of programming in 1983. In that role, he also oversaw the launch and development of MuchMusic, the first of CHUM's forays into ownership and operation of cable channels.

In March 2000, he was named senior vice-president and general manager of the company, before being promoted to president and chief executive officer in 2002. He stepped down in 2007 after CHUM was acquired by CTVglobemedia. He then joined the board of directors of OutTV, and became one of the founding investors in Glassbox Television. In 2011, he was one of the founding partners in the new pay TV film service Hollywood Suite, and joined the board of directors of Shaftesbury Films.

He was married to actress Ellen Dubin.

He died in Toronto of brain cancer.

== Honours ==
He was inducted into the Canadian Association of Broadcasters Hall of Fame in 2004.

He was named to the Order of Canada in December 2017. In January 2018, just before his death, the Academy of Canadian Cinema and Television named him as a recipient of its Board of Directors Tribute award, alongside Margaret Atwood, to honour his work in and commitments to the Canadian broadcasting industry.
