= Supinder Wraich =

Canadian actress and filmmaker

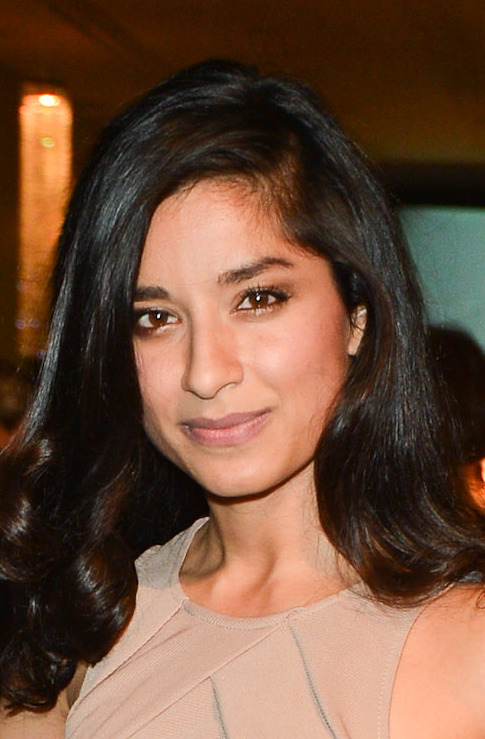
- Born: 3 November 1986 (age 39); Chandigarh, India
- Occupation: Actress
- Years active: 2011-present
- Known for: Guidestones, The 410

Supinder Wraich (/rætʃ/ RATCH) is an Indian-born Canadian actress. For her starring roles in the web series Guidestones, she won the Canadian Screen Award for Performance in a Program or Series Produced for Digital Media at the 3rd Canadian Screen Awards, The 410, and Allegiance, playing a rookie police officer in Surrey, BC.

== Career ==
She also had regular roles in the television series The 99, Copper and Crawford, and wrote and directed the short films Chinesey and Ruby's Tuesday. She also appeared in the music video of Imran Khan's hit single Pata Chalgea.

== Personal life ==
Wraich was born in Chandigarh, India and raised in the Rexdale neighbourhood of Toronto. She lived in Brampton before university; her mother and father owned and operated a trucking school as of 2019. In addition to a Bachelor of Arts degree in communications, Wraich graduated from Sheridan College's Advanced Film & Television Program and was chosen for a 2012 residency at the prestigious Canadian Film Centre.

== Filmography ==
=== Film ===
Year	Title	Role	Notes
2011	Night Vision	Club Owner	
2011	Textuality	Heather	
2012	Margarita	Hot Tub Girl	
2014	Harriet's House	Luisa	
2019	Beast Within	Nikki	
2020	Hazy Little Thing	Priya	

=== Television ===
Year	Title	Role	Notes
2009, 2010	The Border	Nisha Palam	2 episodes
2010	Degrassi: The Next Generation	Doctor	Episode: "Halo: Part 2"
2011	Combat Hospital	Afghan Girl #2	Episode: "Triage"
2012	The 99	Hadya the Guide	26 episodes
2012–2014	Guidestones	Sandy Rai	66 episodes
2013	Copper	Lola	7 episodes
2014	Haven	Guard Nurse	2 episodes
2015	Saving Hope	Chiti	Episode: "Fearless"
2015	Backpackers	Mandy	Episode: "Andrew's Version"
2015	Rookie Blue	Pria Malik	Episode: "Open Windows"
2017	Incorporated	Marisa	Episode: "Sweating the Assets"
2017	The Strain	Selah	2 episodes
2017	The Beaverton	Various roles	3 episodes
2018	Crawford	Rita	7 episodes
2018	The Good Doctor	Jas Kohli	Episode: "Two-Ply (or Not Two-Ply)"
2018, 2020	The Expanse	Talissa Kamal	2 episodes
2019	The 410	Suri	3 episodes
2020–2021	Private Eyes	Kate Bashwa	3 episodes
2021	Hudson & Rex	Fiona Matthews	Episode: "Mansion on a Hill"
2021	SurrealEstate	Priya	Episode: "White Wedding"
2021–2023	Sort Of	Aqsa	Main Cast
2024	Allegiance	Sabrina Sohal	Series lead

=== Accolades ===
Year	Award	Category	Nominee(s)	Result	Ref.
2022	Peabody Awards	Entertainment	Sort Of	Nominated	
