= Hollywood Suite =

Canadian premium TV networks

- Country: Canada
- Broadcast area: National
- Headquarters: Toronto, Ontario

Programming
- Picture format: 1080i (HDTV)

Ownership
- Owner: Anthem Sports & Entertainment

History
- Launched: November 23, 2011; 14 years ago

Links
- Website: Hollywood Suite

Availability

Streaming media
- Amazon Prime Channels: Over-the-top TV

Hollywood Suite is a group of four Canadian discretionary specialty channels, each either majority-owned or wholly owned by Anthem Sports & Entertainment (ASE).

The four channels are primarily devoted to commercial-free classic and contemporary films, with each of the four channels devoted to one or more decades, including the 1970s and older (Hollywood Suite 70s+ Movies), the 1980s and 1990s (80s & 90s Movies), the 2000s (2000s Movies), and the 2010s and newer (2010s+ Movies).

Its channels are separately licensed services (in contrast to competing premium television services in Canada, which at the time of launch, were Category A-licensed and whose additional channels are treated as multiplex channels operating under a single CRTC license); the four channels are typically bundled together in a single package.

They were originally founded in 2011 by Hollywood Suite Inc., a privately held company founded by Jay Switzer, Jeff Sackman, Michael McLaughlin, Cathern Tait, and David Kines. On June 1, 2025, a year after an undisclosed deal was announced, ASE completed the acquisition of the company.

== History ==
On July 2, 2010, on behalf of a corporation to be incorporated, veteran Canadian television executive Jay Switzer was granted approval by the Canadian Radio-television and Telecommunications Commission (CRTC) for four new category 2, high-definition specialty channels. The four channels included "Velocity" and "Adventure"—which would be "devoted to the entire genre of action and adventure, including selections from crime fiction, and epic and heroic drama", as well as "KISS" and "The Love Channel"—which would both be "devoted to romance, love and relationships."

The four channels launched on November 23, 2011 under the blanket branding Hollywood Suite, with all four channels typically distributed as a single package; the channels were marketed as providing a "pure" and "high quality" service at a lower cost in comparison to other premium television services in Canada.

== Channels ==
Hollywood Suite consists of four specialty channels focusing on films, and in some cases TV series, from the 1970s and earlier, 1980s and 1990s, 2000s, and the 2010s and newer respectively. The service also offers a video on-demand channel, and the TV Everywhere streaming service Hollywood Suite Go.

The four channels were previously formatted with either a theme, or featuring films from specific studios under brand licensing agreements; they originally launched as WarnerFilms (focusing primarily on Warner Bros. Pictures films), MGM Channel (focusing primarily on MGM films), Hollywood Storm (which focused primarily on action films), and Hollywood Festival (which focused primarily on romantic films). On May 31, 2012, Hollywood Suite announced it had reached a partnership with Sony Pictures Television to re-launch Hollywood Storm and Hollywood Festival as AXN Movies and Sony Movie Channel respectively. At the time of the rebrand, AXN Investments took a 46.66% ownership in the two channels. The rebrand occurred on September 4, 2012.

In September 2015, Hollywood Suite announced that it would re-launch its channels on November 2, 2015, dropping the studio-based brands in favour of dedicating each channel to a specific decade, including 1970s, 1980s, 1990s, and 2000s. On June 1, 2025, Hollywood Suite unveiled an updated branding and updated its channel lineup; the 70s Movies channel was rebranded as "70s+ Movies" to be inclusive of older films (including "Golden Age classics that shaped modern culture"), the 80s and 90s Movies channels were merged, the existing 90s Movies channel became 2000s Movies, and the existing 00s Movies channel became "2010s+ Movies" to include newer films.

== Ownership ==
Hollywood Suite Inc.
- Company type: Private
- Industry: Media
- Founded: 2010; 16 years ago
- Founders: David Kines; Jay Switzer; Jeff Sackman
- Headquarters: Toronto, Ontario, Canada
- Key people: David Kines (President)
- Website: hollywoodsuite.ca

According to CRTC records as of May 2022, the largest shareholders in Hollywood Suite Inc. were actress Ellen Dubin (widow of Jay Switzer, who died in 2018) at 22.11%, Farmhouse Productions owner Kent Sobey (a relative of deceased previous shareholder Donald Sobey) at 15.38%, and ThinkFilm founder Jeff Sackman at 14.23%, with other shareholders holding combined interests of 50.05%.

In turn, Sony subsidiary AXN Investments held a net 46.66% interest in a subsidiary which owned the 90s and 00s Movies channels (formerly AXN Movies and Sony Movie Channel respectively), with the 70s and 80s Movies channels remaining wholly owned by Hollywood Suite.

On September 25, 2024, Anthem Sports & Entertainment announced its intent to acquire Hollywood Suite for an undisclosed amount, pending CRTC approval. Although it was reported that the acquisition had been completed in June 2025, CRTC only approved the deal three months later.

David Kines remains president of the networks, while Kines and SVP of operations Quincy Raby subsequently received expanded roles within Anthem.
