= Etthén Heldeli: Caribou Eaters =

2018 Canadian documentary film

- Written by: Jason Britski; Ian Toews
- Directed by: Ian Toews
- Music by: Wolf Willow
- Country of origin: Canada
- Original language: English

Production
- Producers: Hildy W. Bowen; Cary Ciesielski; Mike MacNaughton
- Cinematography: Ian Toews
- Editor: Jason Britski
- Running time: 44 minutes
- Production company: Caribou Productions

Original release
- Network: Citytv
- Release: October 21, 2018

Etthén Heldeli: Caribou Eaters is a Canadian documentary film, directed by Ian Toews and released in 2018. The film centres on the Dene people in northern Saskatchewan, and their traditional winter caribou hunt.

The film premiered October 21, 2018 on Citytv. It was subsequently screened at the Yorkton Film Festival in 2019, where it was a nominee for the Ruth Shaw Best of Saskatchewan and Best Multicultural Film awards.

The film received a Canadian Screen Award nomination for Best Documentary Program at the 8th Canadian Screen Awards in 2020.
