= First Contact (Canadian TV series) =

Canadian documentary television series

First Contact is a Canadian documentary television series, which premiered on APTN in 2018. Based on the Australian series First Contact, the show profiles six Canadians who are challenged over a period of 28 days about their pre-existing perceptions of First Nations peoples by experiencing indigenous Canadian life firsthand.

The series was narrated by George Stroumboulopoulos.

The series received Canadian Screen Award nominations for Best Factual Program or Series at the 7th Canadian Screen Awards in 2019 and at the 8th Canadian Screen Awards in 2020.

== Episodes ==
=== Season 1 (2018) ===
No. in season	Title	Directed by	Written by	Original release date
1	"The Journey Begins"	Jeff Newman	Jeff Newman	11 September 2018
Six Canadians start their journey in Winnipeg, Manitoba, speaking to activist Michael Redhead Champagne. Half begin work with the Bear Clan patrol, keeping watch on the streets, while the other half help Drag the Red look for evidence of Missing and Murdered Indigenous Women in the Red River. From here, they venture north to the remote Inuit hamlet of Kimmirut and learn about the way of life there.
2	"A Group Divided"	Jeff Newman	Jeff Newman	12 September 2018
The group flies in to Muskrat Dam Lake First Nation in Northern Ontario to learn about the struggles of living in a remote Indigenous community. Next, they visit Maskwacis, a Cree community in central Alberta, where they attend their first powwow and experience a sweat lodge ceremony.
3	"The Road to Healing"	Jeff Newman	Jeff Newman	13 September 2018
The first stop is Calgary, Alberta for discussion about harm reduction related to substance abuse in Indigenous residents before heading to Edmonton, Alberta to visit inmates in Indigenous healing focused penitentiaries. The six travellers' 28 day adventure comes to a close in Ahousaht First Nation on Vancouver Island, British Columbia where they learn about the changes made to improve the community and participate in a sacred ceremony.
