= Life Is a Cabaret (Schitt's Creek) =

- Schitt's Creek episode
- Episode no.: Season 5 Episode 14
- Directed by: Daniel Levy; Andrew Cividino
- Written by: Daniel Levy
- Cinematography by: Gerald Packer
- Editing by: Trevor Ambrose
- Production code: 262452-66
- Original air date: April 9, 2019
- Running time: 22 minutes

Episode chronology
← Previous "The Hike"	Next → "Smoke Signals"

"Life Is a Cabaret" is the fourteenth and final episode of the fifth season of the Canadian television sitcom Schitt's Creek. In the episode, Patrick and Stevie perform in a local rendition of the musical Cabaret.

== Plot ==
After Patrick proposed to him the previous day, David plans to reveal their engagement to their friends that night, following Moira's rendition of Cabaret, starring Patrick and Stevie. Upon entering the motel all giddy, Stevie deduces something is up, causing David to reveal the engagement to her. Later, when it is discovered that Stevie has disappeared, David again reveals the proposal to Roland, Moira, and Alexis, and the news quickly spreads.

The night of the musical, Johnny finds out about the engagement, and Moira initially intends to play the part herself, but Stevie returns in time, having run off to retrieve embroidered towels she bought for Patrick and David. During the musical, Moira provides encouraging words to Stevie, leading her to deliver a fantastic performance of Maybe This Time. That night, David attempts to reveal his engagement to the crowd, but is interrupted by those who already knew. Moira then screams at the revelation that The Crows Have Eyes 3: The Crowening, her new film, has been shelved.

== Reception ==
Maggie Fremont of Vulture rated the episode 5 out of 5 stars, noting the character development of the Rose family, and wrote that "Throughout this show's run, most people, including me, like to discuss how much Schitt's Creek has changed the Rose family for the better, but in this episode, we are reminded that the Roses have changed [the town] and its inhabitants too, none more than Stevie.

The episode received seven Canadian Screen Award nominations at the 8th Canadian Screen Awards in 2020, for Best Costume Design (Debra Hanson), Best Photography in a Comedy Series (Gerald Packer), Best Picture Editing in a Comedy Series (Trevor Ambrose), Best Production Design or Art Direction in a Fiction Program or Series (Brendan Smith), Best Sound in a Fiction Program or Series (Rob Hegedus, Kathy Choi, Herwig Gayer, Martin Lee and Jane Tattersall), Best Hairstyling (Annastasia Cucullo and Ana Sorys) and Best Direction in a Comedy Series (Dan Levy and Andrew Cividino). Cucullo and Sorys won the award for Best Hairstyling.
