= Rupinder Gill =

Canadian writer

- Born: 1980 (age 45–46)
- Occupation: writer
- Notable work: On the Outside Looking Indian (2011)

Rupinder Gill (born 1980) is a Canadian writer. She is a former television publicist for Alliance Atlantis and BBC Canada.

Her first book, On the Outside Looking Indian is a humorous memoir about her childhood as the child of Indian immigrants in a small Canadian town. The book was shortlisted for the 2012 Stephen Leacock Memorial Medal for Humour.

Her book garnered attention before its release because the popular website Reddit featured the book's spoof back cover featuring Oprah Winfrey's quote for A Tale of Two Cities. Gill has written for Canadian comedy shows This Hour Has 22 Minutes and Schitt's Creek, the National Post and websites such as McSweeney's.

Gill is a writer for The Sex Lives of College Girls and is credited with writing five episodes.
