= Super Queeroes =

- Genre: Web series, documentary, LGBTQ
- Created by: Peter Knegt
- Country of origin: Canada
- Original language: English

Original release
- Release: 2019

Super Queeroes is a Canadian multimedia web project, which launched in 2019 on CBC Arts. Created as a Pride Month project to mark the 50th anniversary of the Stonewall Riots, the project featured LGBTQ Canadians creating short video, essay or art projects in tribute to another influential LGBTQ Canadian trailblazer. It was conceived by writer and producer Peter Knegt.

The project selected a total of 69 honorees because Stonewall had taken place in 1969; seven of the honorees were duos or groups, but were counted as a single honoree because they were being named collectively rather than as individuals.

The project won the Canadian Screen Award for Best Interactive Production at the 8th Canadian Screen Awards in 2020.

In 2025, a new edition of the project named 32 new figures, bringing the total number of Super Queeroes to 101.

== 2019 ==
- Stephen Andrews
- Joe Average
- Marie-Claire Blais
- The Body Politic
- Michel Marc Bouchard
- Dionne Brand
- Nicole Brossard
- Wayson Choy
- Ivan Coyote
- Shawna Dempsey and Lorri Millan
- Xavier Dolan
- Jeremy Dutcher
- Evergon
- Timothy Findley
- Thom Fitzgerald
- Richard Fung
- General Idea
- Sky Gilbert
- Beverly Glenn-Copeland
- John Greyson
- The Hidden Cameras
- Tomson Highway
- Nalo Hopkinson
- Christopher House
- William Hutt
- G.B. Jones
- Kiss and Tell collective
- Elvira Kurt
- Bruce LaBruce
- Mado Lamotte
- k.d. lang
- Dan Levy
- Attila Richard Lukacs
- Ann-Marie MacDonald
- Daniel MacIvor
- Allyson Mitchell and Deirdre Logue
- Kent Monkman
- Will Munro
- Billy Newton-Davis
- Faith Nolan
- Midi Onodera
- Elliot Page
- Owen Pallett
- Candy Palmater
- Peaches
- Léa Pool
- Carole Pope
- Michelle Ross
- Mirha-Soleil Ross
- Patricia Rozema
- Jane Rule
- Craig Russell
- Trish Salah
- Lorraine Segato
- Shyam Selvadurai
- Jackie Shane
- Vivek Shraya
- Lucas Silveira
- Makeda Silvera
- Rae Spoon
- Adrian Stimson
- Jordan Tannahill
- Tegan and Sara
- Scott Thompson
- Michel Tremblay
- Rufus Wainwright
- Syrus Marcus Ware
- Witch Prophet
- Paul Wong

An additional article published at the end of the project also highlighted a number of other figures who were worthy of inclusion in the project despite having not been among the chosen honorees, including Trey Anthony, Brandon Ash-Mohammed, Wayne Baerwaldt, Billy-Ray Belcourt, Paul Bellini, Bif Naked, Heather Bishop, Deanna Bowen, Martha Chaves, Meryn Cadell, Brent Carver, Cœur de pirate, Keith Cole, Douglas Coupland, Susan G. Cole, Toller Cranston, TJ Cuthand, Amber Dawn, Emma Donoghue, Michelle DuBarry, Stephen Dunn, Ali Eisner, Brendan Fernandes, Ferron, Brad Fraser, Christopher Gillis, Rex Harrington, John Herbert, René Highway, Ahasiw Maskegon-Iskwew, iskwē, Adam Garnet Jones, Chase Joynt, Ladyfag, Zachari Logan, Ashley MacIsaac, Norman McLaren, Rick Mercer, Louis Negin, Charles Pachter, Evalyn Parry, Jean-Pierre Perreault, Ed Pien, Casey Plett, Jaik Puppyteeth, David Rakoff, Tedd Robinson, Walter K. Scott, Tommy Sexton, Rowan Sky, Scott Symons, Kai Cheng Thom, Tanja Tiziana, Scott Treleaven, Gary Varro, Joshua Whitehead, Zoe Whittall, Patricia Wilson and d'bi.young anitafrika.

== 2025 ==
- Backxwash
- Zaiba Baig
- Billy-Ray Belcourt
- Cassils
- TJ Cuthand
- Rodney Diverlus
- Ali J. Eisner
- Nick Green
- Samra Habib
- Catherine Hernandez
- Stephen Jackman-Torkoff
- Devery Jacobs
- Connor Jessup
- Gay Jesus
- Chase Joynt
- Teiya Kasahara
- Kaytranada
- Sook-Yin Lee
- Michelle Mama
- Mae Martin
- Anthony Oliveira
- Orville Peck
- Laurence Philomène
- Casey Plett
- The Queens of Canada's Drag Race
- Emma Seligman
- Christopher Sherman
- Fay Slift and Fluffy Soufflé
- Kai Cheng Thom
- Joshua Whitehead
- Zoe Whittall
- Celeste Yim
