= Crystal Pite: Angels' Atlas =

- Directed by: Chelsea McMullan
- Written by: Chelsea McMullan
- Produced by: Sean O'Neill
- Starring: Crystal Pite
- Cinematography: Maya Bankovic
- Edited by: Lindsay Allikas
- Music by: Kieran Adams
- Production companies: Visitor Media; National Ballet of Canada
- Release date: October 2, 2022 (VIFF)
- Running time: 64 minutes
- Country: Canada
- Language: English

Crystal Pite: Angels' Atlas is a 2022 Canadian documentary film, directed by Chelsea McMullan. The film profiles choreographer Crystal Pite as she works with the National Ballet of Canada to stage her ballet Angels' Atlas as the company's first new stage production since the COVID-19 pandemic shut down live stage productions in 2020, illuminating her creative process through the depiction of rehearsals until ending with a full, uninterrupted performance of the work.

The film premiered at the 2022 Vancouver International Film Festival. It was subsequently screened in Toronto on October 4 at the Fall for Dance North festival, before its television premiere on November 25 on the Documentary Channel.

== Critical response ==
Johanna Schneller of The Globe and Mail praised the fact that between Angels' Atlas and Ever Deadly, McMullan had two different yet complementary, and both innovative, documentaries about the creative process premiering around the same time, while Janet Smith of Stir praised McMullan for successfully finding new ways to film dance.

== Awards ==
At VIFF, the film was named the winner of the Audience Award in the Showcase program.

The film received two Canadian Screen Award nominations at the 11th Canadian Screen Awards in 2023, for Best Photography in a Documentary Program or Factual Series (Maya Bankovic) and Best Sound in a Documentary Program or Factual Series (Graham Rogers, Stefana Fratila, Krystin Hunter, Dane Kelly).
