= World Famous Gopher Hole Museum =

- Directed by: Chelsea McMullan; Douglas Nayler
- Produced by: Kylie McMullan
- Cinematography: Maya Bankovic
- Edited by: Douglas Nayler
- Music by: Simone Schmidt
- Release date: September 12, 2015 (TIFF)
- Running time: 15 minutes
- Country: Canada
- Language: English

World Famous Gopher Hole Museum is a 2015 Canadian short documentary film directed by Chelsea McMullan and Douglas Nayler. The film centres on the Torrington Gopher Hole Museum in Torrington, Alberta, a museum in which stuffed gophers are posed in various anthropomorphic situations.

The film premiered at the 2015 Toronto International Film Festival.

The film was shortlisted for the Canadian Screen Award for Best Short Documentary at the 4th Canadian Screen Awards.
