= CBC Arts =

Division of the Canadian Broadcasting Corporation

CBC Arts Radio-Canada Arts
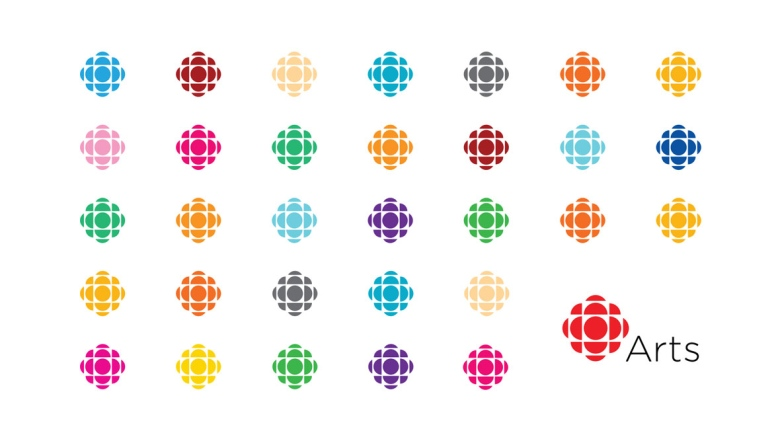
- Type: Department of the CBC
- Industry: Media
- Founded: July 1, 2015
- Headquarters: Canadian Broadcasting Centre, Toronto, Ontario, Canada; Maison Radio-Canada, Montreal, Quebec, Canada
- Area served: Specific services for Canada and rest of world
- Services: Television and digital services
- Owner: CBC
- Website: cbc.ca/arts ici.radio-canada.ca/arts

CBC Arts (French: Radio-Canada Arts) is the division of the Canadian Broadcasting Corporation that creates and curates written articles, short documentaries, non-fiction series and interactive projects that represent the excellence of Canada's diverse artistic communities.

Some of the series and projects CBC Arts has produced include 21 Black Futures, Art 101, Art Hurts, Big Things Small Towns, Canada's a Drag, The Collective, Crash Gallery, Exhibitionists, The Filmmakers, Interrupt This Program, The Move, Super Queeroes and The 2010s: The Decade Canadian Artists Stopped Saying Sorry. Regular features include Here & Queer, a talk show hosted by Peter Knegt on LGBTQ arts and entertainment, and Cutaways, a regular column in which Canadian filmmakers write about their experiences making their newest films.

CBC Arts has received considerable acclaim, winning multiple Canadian Screen Awards including for best talk show (The Filmmakers), non-fiction webseries (Canada's a Drag) and interactive production (Super Queeroes and The 2010s: The Decade Canadian Artists Stopped Saying Sorry). Staff members Amanda Parris and Peter Knegt both write Digital Publishing Award-winning weekly columns for the CBC Arts website that highlight Black and LGBTQ culture from a Canadian perspective, respectively. Other contributors to the website have included Kelsey Adams, Allysin Chaynes, Anne T. Donahue, Alicia Elliott, Samra Habib, Catherine Hernandez, Shawn Hitchins, Ben Lewis, Téa Mutonji, Owen Pallett, Casey Plett, Heath V. Salazar, Rae Spoon, Arielle Twist, Rinaldo Walcott, Joshua Whitehead and Michael Yerxa.
