= Gurdeep Pandher =

Yukon-based author, teacher and performer

- Born: Siahar, Punjab, India
- Citizenship: Canada
- Occupations: Author, educator and performer
- Honours: Meritorious Service Medal (Canada)
- Website: https://gurdeep.ca

Gurdeep Pandher is a Sikh-Canadian author, teacher and performer best known for sharing Punjabi dance videos. His videos have been featured in French-Canadian media outlets, as well as on television shows including ITV's breakfast show hosted by Lorraine Kelly, CTV's eTalk, and Rachel Maddow's MSNBC show.

== Biography ==
Pandher was born into a farming family in Siahar, Punjab, India. He moved to Canada in 2006 and became a Canadian citizen in 2011. He has lived in numerous Canadian provinces since, including small Canadian villages, and currently resides in a wilderness cabin in Yukon.

=== Notable dance videos and associated collaborations ===
In 2016, Pandher and his dance partner Manuela Haemmerli shared a video, performing Bhangra with Yukon residents, to commemorate Canada Day. The video was later featured on CBC News and CTV News.

In 2017, Pandher collaborated with Whitehorse Mayor Dan Curtis in the video, teaching the latter how to tie a traditional Sikh turban and perform Bhangra. The video received more than a million views within the first day and was featured on BBC News, Toronto Star, and The Huffington Post. The same year, Pandher shared video with Paralympic swimmer Stephanie Dixon. In the video, both Dixon and Pandher perform a Bhangra routine and swim together in the Yukon hot springs.

In 2019, Pandher and the Canadian Armed Forces collaborated on a Punjabi Bhangra dance video to celebrate diversity and inclusivity in the Canadian military. The video featured soldiers the Royal Canadian Navy, the Royal Canadian Air Force and the Canadian Army Filming took place at the Canadian Forces Base (CFB) at Esquimalt, located west of Victoria, British Columbia. The video was shared by Prime Minister of Canada Justin Trudeau, Canada's Minister of National Defence, Harjit Sajjan and Royal Canadian Navy commander Art McDonald.

Pandher collaborated with Dana Tizya-Tramm, environmental activist and former Chief of the Vuntut Gwitchin First Nation (2019-2023) in a 2019 Bhangra dance video. Aborginal People's Television Network later interviewed both Pandher and Tozya-Tramm.

During the Covid-19 pandemic, Pandher shared several videos to uplift the Yukon and broader Canadian community. His January 2020 video, in which he performs Bhangra outdoors in sub-zero temperature, was featured by CBC as "uplifting stories" of the year. In April 2020, Pandher performed Bhangra set to music by bagpiper Jordan Lincez in the Yukon wilderness while practising social distancing. Canadian author Heather Down included Pandher and Lincez in her book, Not Cancelled: Canadian Kindness in the Face of COVID-19, which chronicled positive experiences from several Canadians during the pandemic.

After sharing a September 2020 video of him performing Bhangra on the front lawn of the Legislative Assembly of British Columbia, Pandher was invited by B.C. Legislature representatives to film a video with their staff. Subsequently, he also posted dance videos with members of the Victoria Police Department (VicPD), Central Saanich Police Service, Oak Bay Police Department, Westshore RCMP, and Duncan/North Cowichan RCMP. A video of him performing Bhangra in the Pacific Rim National Park Reserve on Vancouver Island was recognized as "Tofino's Top 10 Sports and Art Stories of 2020" by British Columbia Local News.

=== Film and television ===
In September 2020, Pandher appeared in Suzanne Crocker's First We Eat, a film about food sovereignty in Northern Canada, produced by Dawson City.

=== Books ===
Pandher authored Mitti De Ghar ("Clay homes"), a Punjabi language poetry anthology published by New Delhi-based Aarsi Publishers. The book consists of poems and songs written by Pandher in his early years.

In 2023, he was one of the panellists on Canada Reads, discussing Dimitri Nasrallah's novel Hotline.

=== Other engagements and ventures ===
Amid the Covid-19 pandemic, as schools began to shut down, Pandher began to offer accessible, pay-what-you-can, virtual Bhangra lessons. In December 2020, Pandher was featured on the cover of Explore, a Canadian adventure and outdoor lifestyle magazine. In 2021, he teamed up with TransLink to create a Bhangra videos encouraging travelers to wear masks while using the Skytrain and other transit services. Pandher appeared on CBC Q's talk show called What're You At? with Tom Power.

In 2016, while dancing to traditional Celtic music by a local band in Whitehorse, Yukon, Pandher noticed how "in sync" the Bhangra dance can be with Scottish or Irish music. This led to the inception of "Bhangra: Dance of Punjab," a live cross-cultural music and dance show featuring a performance by Pandher set to both traditional Punjabi music as well as Irish and Scottish music. The show also included performances by Can-can dancers, Irish dancers, Highland dancers, and musicians from different cultures.

== Awards and honours ==
=== 2026 ===
- Meritorious Service Medal (Civil Division), presented by Governor General Louise Arbour at Rideau Hall in Ottawa, for using "social media and community events to spread joy and hope, and to champion inclusion".

=== 2023 ===
- Honorary Doctor of Laws conferred by Memorial University of Newfoundland at its May 18, 2023 convocation, one of 14 honorary degrees awarded that year.

=== 2021 ===
- Canadian Public Relations Society National President's Award for Outstanding Public Relations and Communications Management.
- One of the Top 25 Canadian Immigrant Awards recipients, presented by Canadian Immigrant and Western Union during the 13th annual edition of the award.
- Royal Canadian Geographical Society's Louie Kamookak Medal, awarded for "bridging cross-cultural divides, promoting inclusivity and spreading optimism and joy" through his work during the COVID-19 pandemic.
- Government of Yukon's annual Community Recreation and Leadership Award "for promoting active living through Bhangra" in the Yukon Territory.
