= My Prairie Home =

My Prairie Home may refer to

- My Prairie Home (album), a 2013 album by Rae Spoon
- My Prairie Home (film), a 2013 documentary film about Rae Spoon
