= Simone Schmidt =

Canadian singer and songwriter

Simone Schmidt (born 1984) is a singer, songwriter, guitarist, producer and composer from Toronto, Ontario, Canada. Schmidt has helmed One Hundred Dollars (2007–11), psych-rock outfit The Highest Order (2011-2016?), and solo project Fiver (2012–present). Schmidt has earned widespread recognition.

== Collaborations ==
Schmidt has worked in varying capacities with musicians hailing from diverse musical traditions such as Destroyer, writing with hardcore punk band Fucked Up, as singer, songwriter and guitarist with bluegrass veteran Chris Coole; producing for singer songwriter Ansley Simpson and creating their latest full length with improvisational unit The Atlantic School of Spontaneous Composition (Bianca Palmer, Jeremy Costello and Nick Dourado).

== Critical reception and award nominations ==
Schmidt's work has obtained widespread critical acclaim. In 2017, Slate magazine named Audibles Sounds from Rockwood as one of the best albums of the year. Their 2021 release, Fiver with the Atlantic School of Spontaneous Composition was lauded by the Guardian newspaper as one the best albums of the year and received positive reviews from Pitchfork Magazine.

Featuring Schmidt on the cover, the Summer 2023 issue of Music Works magazine, described their work:

Simone Schmidt is a visionary artist who consistently finds new possibilities for the country song form. In the Toronto psychedelic country bands One Hundred Dollars and The Highest Order and as Fiver, Schmidt has created some of the most original and vibrant music of the last decade.

They have been nominated for the Polaris Music Prize in 2009 for One Hundred Dollars- Forest of Tears; in 2011 for One Hundred Dollars- Songs Of Man; in 2017 for Fiver- Audible Songs From Rockwood and 2021 for Fiver with the Atlantic School of Spontaneous Composition.

== Audible Sounds of Rockwood ==
Fiver's Audible Songs From Rockwood (2017) is research-based album based on archival case records from the Rockwood Asylum for the Criminally Insane. Schmidt spent three years delving into primary sources like patient case files, superintendents' diaries, newspaper articles and secondary historical sources to write from the perspective of women incarcerated at the Rockwood Asylum for the Criminally Insane in Kingston during the nineteenth century. The songs are performed under the pseudonym Fiver Fines, who interprets the songs "found" by another alias, fictional ethnomusicologist named Simone Carver. The album was recorded by Fiver with the Lonesome Ace String Band. Referencing Smithsonian Folkways Archives, the album is accompanied by extensive liner notes written in the voice of Simone Carver, who frames the historical, colonial and institutional contexts for these "found" songs.

In 2019, Schmidt worked with theatre director Frank Cox-O'Connell to tell the stories of the Rockwood inmates on stage as part of Summerworks Performance Festival.

The research and the form of Audible Songs from Rockwood has been the subject of academic interest.

== Covers ==
Their songs have been admired and covered by other musicians in a variety of genres: in 2018 their song Rage of Plastics [from Fiver- Lost the Plot (2013)] was popularized by U.S. Girls, and in 2020, their song Juice and Sage [One Hundred Dollars- Forest of Tears (2008)] was covered by Stripmall Ballads.

== Soundtracks ==
Land of Destiny (dir. Brett Story, 2010)

Gerontophilia (dir. Bruce La Bruce, 2013)

World Famous Gopher Hole Museum (dir. Chelsea McMullan + Douglas Nayler, 2015)

Circle of Steel (dir Gillian McKercher, 2018)

The Joe Wallace Mixtape: Soundtrack to A More Radiant Sphere (dir. Sarah Wylie, 2022)

== Discography ==
LSDoubleDcup (2008)

== One Hundred Dollars ==
Hold it Together (2007)

Forest of Tears (2008)

"Fourteenth Floor" Regional 7" Part 1 (2009)

My Father's House" - Regional 7" Part 2 (2010)

Songs of Man (2011)

== The Highest Order ==
If It's Real (2013)

Rainbow of Blues B/W The Crying Game (2013)

Still Holding (2016)

== Fiver ==
Two Songs From Fiver (2012)

Home Wreckordings: Running Through A Twin (2012)

Lost the Plot (2013)

Audible Songs From Rockwood (2017)

You Wanted Country? Vol.1 (2020)

Fiver with the Atlantic School of Spontaneous Composition (2021)

Cleaning House (2026)

== Splitter ==
What Do You Want To Hear? (Digital Release, 2023)
