= Peter Knegt =

Canadian writer, producer, and filmmaker

- Born: Trenton, Ontario, Canada
- Occupations: Writer; producer; filmmaker
- Years active: 2006–present
- Known for: IndieWire; Canada's a Drag; Super Queeroes; Here & Queer

Peter Knegt is a Canadian writer, producer, and filmmaker. He is the recipient of six Canadian Screen Awards and his CBC Arts column Queeries received the 2019 Digital Publishing Award for best digital column in Canada.

Knegt began his career as a film journalist, working at IndieWire from 2006 to 2015, with other writing appearing in Variety, Salon, and Film Quarterly. His essay "My Gay Art-Porn Debut", on his experience acting in Travis Mathews's I Want Your Love (2012), first appeared on Salon and was later anthologized in Best Gay Stories 2013. In 2013, he was the recipient of a Queer/Art/Mentorship fellowship and named among "11 Amazing Young Queer Artists You Should Know" by The Advocate.

In July 2011, Knegt founded a four-day film festival in Picton, Ontario. It was inspired by Knegt's experience attending Mark Cousins and Tilda Swinton's festival "A Pilgrimage," which he documented in detail in the essay "Once Upon a Time in the Scottish Highlands".

Knegt's first short film, Good Morning (2014), which he co-directed with Stephen Dunn, wrote and acted in, has been screened at film festivals including BFI Flare: London LGBTQ+ Film Festival and Toronto's Inside Out LGBTQ Film Festival. Knegt's later short films include Are You There Joy? It's Me, Jennifer (2016), A Bed Day (2017), and Plus One (2017), which screened at film festivals in San Francisco, Austin, and Provincetown.

In addition to his work on film, Knegt is a writer on LGBTQ culture and history. His first book, a history of queer rights in Canada, was published in 2011. In a cover story on Knegt, Xtra! writer Matthew Hays described the book as "a fantastic primer on one of our country's key civil rights struggles," and that it was "so smart, succinct and reader-friendly, it's kind of shocking no one thought of writing one like it earlier."

In 2016, Knegt joined CBC Arts, where he writes the weekly LGBTQ-culture column Queeries. He has also served as a producer on projects including Canada's a Drag (2018–present), which received two Canadian Screen Awards for Best Web Program or Series, Non-Fiction; Super Queeroes (2019) and The 2010s: The Decade Canadian Artists Stopped Saying Sorry (2020), both of which received Canadian Screen Awards for Best Production, Interactive; and Queer Pride Inside (2020), a digital cabaret produced in collaboration with Buddies in Bad Times Theatre. He has also served as a writer on The Filmmakers and co-host on the digital talk show State of the Arts with Amanda Parris.

In 2022, he created the LGBTQ-focused talk show Here & Queer, and began curating and hosting the Toronto film screening series Queer Cinema Club.

In October 2024, Knegt announced that he was retiring the Queeries column, though he clarified that was not leaving the CBC, and would continue to host Here & Queer and other projects. He also indicated that CBC Arts will be launching a new replacement column on LGBTQ arts and culture, to be written by a variety of guest writers. This column was launched in January 2025 under the new name Emerging Queer Voices. It is curated and edited by Knegt.
