= Michelle Ross (drag queen) =

Jamaican Canadian drag queen

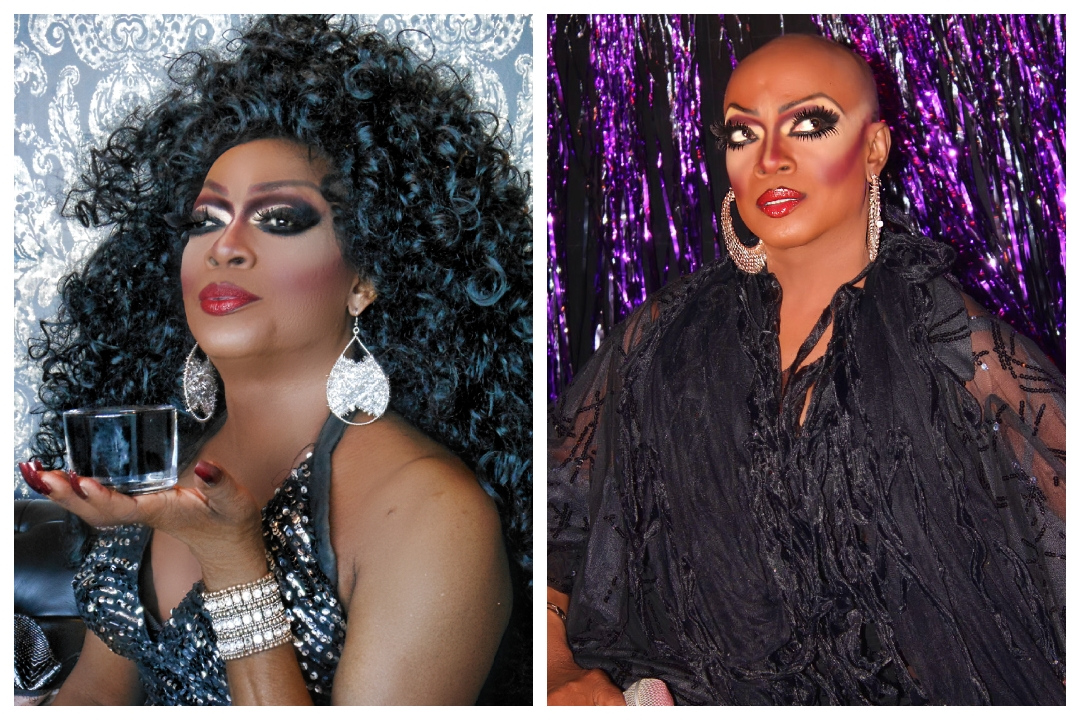
- Michelle Ross
- Born: Earl Barrington Shaw; August 5, 1954; Jamaica
- Died: March 27, 2021 (aged 66); North York, Ontario, Canada
- Occupation: Drag queen
- Years active: 1974 - 2021

Michelle Ross was the stage name of Earl Barrington Shaw (August 5, 1954 – March 27, 2021), a Jamaican Canadian drag queen who was active from 1974 until her death in 2021. She was considered one of the key icons of the LGBTQ community in Toronto, especially for Black Canadian members of the community.

== Career ==
She performed in drag for the first time at Toronto's Club Manatee in 1974, to Dionne Warwick's "Anyone Who Had a Heart". In Toronto, she was a regular performer at bars in the Church and Wellesley gay village, and a frequent performer at Pride Toronto's Blockorama parties. She also performed internationally, including a six-year stint as part of the Toronto cast and touring production of An Evening at La Cage. She had small acting roles in the 1977 film Outrageous!, and the 2014 film Seek, and appeared in the documentary films Divas: Love Me Forever and Our Dance of Revolution.

Throughout her career, she was known for performing to the music of disco and soul music divas such as Patti LaBelle, Gloria Gaynor and Gladys Knight, but was most famous for her performances of Diana Ross songs. As of 2018, she had performed on stage at least 15,000 times. Dancer and choreographer Hollywood Jade got his start choreographing numbers for Ross.

She once expressed her drag philosophy about the difference between men and women as "Both sides are equally part of the glamour. I see them as stories that are ready for a makeover." Her signature move was to remove her wig at the end of her set, to call attention to drag as a performance.

== Legacy ==
In 2019, she was named as one of 69 key Canadian LGBTQ icons in the Canadian Screen Award-winning Super Queeroes multimedia project. Following the announcement of her death on March 28, 2021, statements of tribute were issued by a variety of influential figures including Toronto mayor John Tory, writer Rinaldo Walcott and drag queens Brooke Lynn Hytes and Priyanka, and organizations including Pride Toronto, The 519, Glad Day Bookshop and the Toronto chapter of Black Lives Matter.

In the third season of the drag competition series Canada's Drag Race, competitor Jada Shada Hudson paid tribute to Ross as a trailblazer and inspiration, both in a mid-season workroom discussion about community icons and in her runway speech in the season finale.

In October 2025, the CBC Television documentary series The Passionate Eye premiered Michelle Ross: Unknown Icon, a documentary film by Alison Duke about the contrast between Ross's larger-than-life persona and reputation as an entertainer, and Shaw's private personal life with his own family, who knew only that he worked as a designer and were not aware that he was the legendary Michelle Ross until his death.

== Filmography ==
=== Film ===
Year	Title	Role	Notes	Ref.
1977	Outrageous!	Performer in Pink	Credited as "Michel"	
2002	Divas: Love Me Forever	Herself	Documentary	
2014	Seek	Michelle Ross		
2019	Our Dance of Revolution	Herself	Documentary	
2025	Parade: Queer Acts of Love and Resistance	Herself (archival footage)	Documentary	
2025	Michelle Ross: Unknown Icon	Herself	Documentary	
