= Jaik =

Jaik is a surname and given name. Notable people with this name include:

- Jaik Campbell (born 1973), British comedian
- Jaik Mickleburgh (born 1990), English cricketer
- Jaik Puppyteeth, Canadian artist
- Juhan Jaik (1899–1948), Estonian writer and journalist
