= In the Making (TV series) =

Canadian television series

- Genre: Documentary
- Created by: Sean O'Neill
- Presented by: Sean O'Neill
- Country of origin: Canada
- Original language: English

Original release
- Network: CBC Television
- Release: September 21, 2018

In the Making is a Canadian television documentary series, which premiered on CBC Television on September 21, 2018. Co-created and hosted by Sean O'Neill, the series explores the creative process by profiling notable Canadian artists as they meet pivotal moments in their lives and work.

Artists profiled in the first season of the series included musicians Lido Pimienta and Chilly Gonzales, choreographers Dana Michel and Crystal Pite, and visual artists Adrian Stimson, Shelley Niro, Divya Mehra and Curtis Talwst Santiago.

The series received three Canadian Screen Award nominations at the 7th Canadian Screen Awards in 2019, for Best Photography in a Documentary Factual Series (Maya Bankovic), Best Direction in a Documentary or Factual Series (Chelsea McMullan) and Best Music in a Non-Fiction Program (Kieran Adams).
