= Torrington Gopher Hole Museum =

Museum in Alberta, Canada

Coordinates: 51.79147°N 113.603354°W

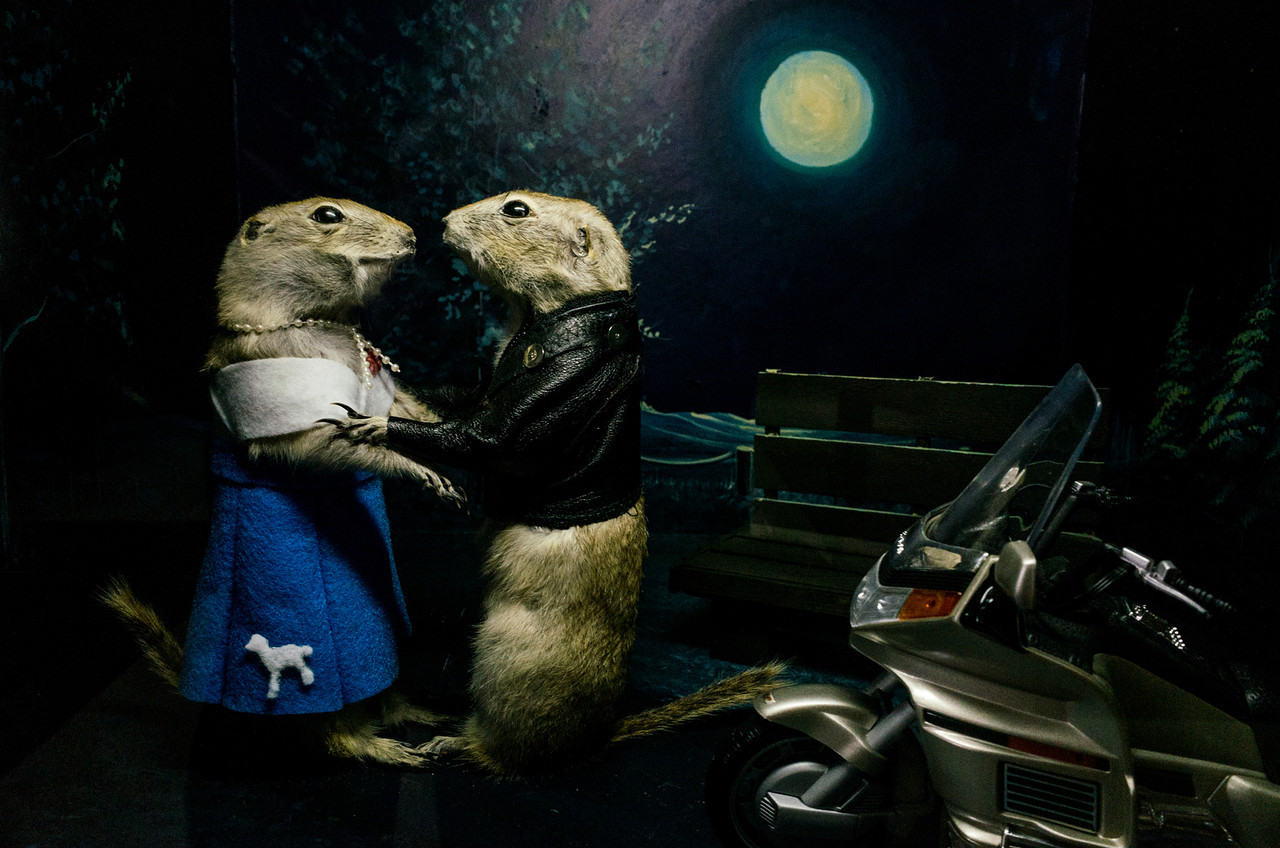
- Scene from the Gopher Hole Museum
- Established: 1996
- Location: Torrington, Alberta
- Collections: Taxidermied ground squirrels
- Website: worldfamousgopherholemuseum.ca

The Torrington Gopher Hole Museum, also known as the World Famous Gopher Hole Museum, is a roadside attraction in Torrington, Alberta, known for its collection of 88 taxidermied Richardson's ground squirrels, commonly called gophers, arranged in 44 dioramas depicting scenes of human activity. Established in 1996, the museum closed indefinitely in late September 2026 because its aging buildings could no longer provide the temperature and humidity conditions needed to preserve the collection. Conditions were such that, even with air conditioning, the heat was also putting volunteers at risk during their shifts.The museum launched an online fundraiser to build a replacement museum, with the aim of keeping it in Torrington.

The museum will be finding new ways to stay in the public eye during this time of uncertainty. In 2026, it was invited to attend Calgary Expo, a very popular collaboration. The museum hopes to create other unique opportunities for the public to experience the displays for 2027 while it is in transition. Dioramas have been lent out to other museums in the past few years which has proven to increase the traffic to those locations. The Gopher Hole Museum feels strongly about supporting other small, rural museums.

Roughly 15,000 people have visited the museum every year since the end of COVID surpassing previous visitation of 7-10,000 annually. The museum was open seasonally, primarily during the summer months, with visits at other times available by request, subject to volunteer availability. Dioramas depicted gophers as hunters, firefighters, cosmetologists, priests, bank robbers, RCMP officers, pool players, and First Nations people. From its opening until recently, the museum charged $2 admission for adults and 50 cents for children aged 12–18, while children under 12 were admitted free of charge. With no increases for 24 years, the museum was financially ill equipped to deal with the COVID closures or a huge capital expense like a new building. With the loss of revenue resulting from the pandemic and soaring expenses, the museum switched to a "by donation" model in its final years.

== Backstory ==
After the decommissioning of railway lines and the subsequent closure of the town's grain elevators, resulting in huge revenue losses for the community, a one-time $9,000 grant from the Government of Alberta was applied to by the Village of Torrington (Unincorporated 1997) the purpose of which was to create a tourist attraction to generate business for the small community. At the last of three brainstorming meetings for the grant, one woman (referring to the scourge of farmers' existence...it is an agricultural community...and area's ground squirrel overpopulation) jokingly suggested to stuff 'gophers' and put them on display. News of the museum spread quickly worldwide after a small filler piece aired on a Calgary news station after which the museum attracted international attention of both supporters and protesters, with PETA being the most notable among them.

The museum is constructed of two small buildings, a one-room, rural school house and one of the former grain elevator offices. Both have historic value to the area. They were covered with shiplap to create the appearance of one building. Specimens were provided by area farmers, hunters and veterinarians. Five local people offered to learn taxidermy. Some volunteers found or created miniatures for the dioramas, while others helped create clothing for them. Volunteers also operated, maintained, and provided tours for the museum and also came up with the ideas for the exhibits.

The west exterior mural was created by the local artist Wayne Schneider, who is listed in the National Gallery of Canada and was an artistic director on Canadian comedy series SCTV.

The museum is profiled in Chelsea McMullan's 2015 documentary film World Famous Gopher Hole Museum. It has also been featured in CBC's weekly drama Heartland; Reader's Digest; National Geographic; Ripley's Believe it or Not; the textbook by UofA professor, Lianne McTavish, Voluntary Detours.
