= I Was Lorena Bobbitt =

- Genre: Drama
- Written by: Barbara Nance
- Directed by: Danishka Esterhazy
- Starring: Luke Humphrey; Dani Montalvo
- Narrated by: Lorena Gallo
- Countries of origin: Canada; United States
- Original language: English

Production
- Producers: Jeff Vanderwal; Kim Bondi; Lorena Gallo; Sherri Rufh; Andy Streitfeld; Charles Tremayne
- Cinematography: Maya Bankovic
- Editor: Hugh Elchuk
- Running time: 110 minutes
- Production company: Cineflix

Original release
- Network: Lifetime
- Release: May 25, 2020

I Was Lorena Bobitt is a 2020 Canadian-American dramatic television film, directed by Danishka Esterhazy. The film stars Luke Humphrey and Dani Montalvo as John and Lorena Bobbitt, the Virginia couple whose troubled marriage became international news in 1993 when Lorena cut off her husband's penis with a knife.

Although primarily acted as a dramatic story, the film also includes some narration by Lorena Bobbitt Gallo herself. Its cast also included Niamh Wilson, Patrice Goodman, Richard Clarkin and Dan Lett.

The film premiered May 25, 2020 on Lifetime. Its broadcast was accompanied by a special public service announcement promoting services to combat domestic violence, starring Humphrey, Montalvo and Gallo.

== Awards ==
Award	Date of ceremony	Category	Nominees	Result	Reference
Canadian Screen Awards	April 2022	Best TV Movie	Jeff Vanderwal, Kim Bondi, Lorena Gallo, Sherri Rufh, Andy Streitfeld, Charles Tremayne	Won	
Canadian Screen Awards	April 2022	Best Lead Actor in a Television Film or Miniseries	Luke Humphrey	Won	
Canadian Screen Awards	April 2022	Best Lead Actress in a Television Film or Miniseries	Dani Montalvo	Nominated	
Canadian Screen Awards	April 2022	Best Direction in a TV Movie	Danishka Esterhazy	Won	
Canadian Screen Awards	April 2022	Best Writing in a TV Movie	Barbara Nance	Won	
Canadian Screen Awards	April 2022	Best Photography in a Drama Program or Series	Maya Bankovic	Nominated	
