= Never Cry Werewolf =

2008 Canadian television film

- DVD Cover
- Written by: John Sheppard
- Directed by: Brenton Spencer
- Starring: Nina Dobrev; Kevin Sorbo
- Theme music composer: Michael Richard Plowman
- Country of origin: Canada
- Original language: English

Production
- Cinematography: Curtis Petersen
- Editor: Nick Rotundo
- Running time: 87 minutes
- Production companies: House Next Door Films; Red Duck Films

Original release
- Network: Sci Fi Channel
- Release: 11 May 2008

Never Cry Werewolf is a Canadian television film directed by Brenton Spencer, and starring Nina Dobrev, Peter Stebbings and Kevin Sorbo. It premiered on the Sci Fi Channel on May 11, 2008.

== Plot ==
When 16-year-old Loren and her family greet a new neighbor, Jared, a good-looking single guy and his dog, she senses something mysterious and dangerous about him. Her suspicions become further aroused when some of the locals begin disappearing one by one. As Loren becomes obsessed with her neighbor's behavior, she is unaware that he is monitoring her just as closely as a hungry wolf stalking its prey at night. Because Loren reminds her neighbor of his young and deceased wife, Melissa, he claims her as his territory and kills her friend Angie, who seems to be close to her. With the help of local TV hunting show personality Redd Tucker and a delivery boy with a secret crush on attractive Loren, the unlikely trio prepare for a full-moon showdown against an immortal creature with insatiable bloodlust. Jared also has Loren's brother locked inside a freezer. It's her brother's life for hers.

== Cast ==
- Nina Dobrev as Loren Hansett
- Kevin Sorbo as Redd Tucker
- Peter Stebbings as Jared Martin
- Spencer Van Wyck as Kyle Hansett
- Melanie Leishman as Angie Bremlock
- Kim Bourne as Margo
- Sean O'Neill as Steven Kepkie
- Nahanni Johnstone as Christie
- Von Flores as Detective Stalling
- Rothaford Gray as Sergeant Hillam
- Billy Otis as Charles Ray Pope
- Rebekah Boisvert as Young Prostitute #1
- Julie Sype as Prostitute #2
- Greg Calderone as Guy Taylor
- Kelly Fiddick as Clerk
- Anwar Knight as Talk Show Host

== Release ==
It aired on the Sci Fi Channel on May 11, 2008.

== Soundtrack ==
Most of the songs in the film were written and performed by Canadian band The Manvils. The Manvils T-shirts are also worn by various members of the cast throughout the movie itself.

== Reception ==
The plot of the film is very similar to the 1985 American horror vampire film Fright Night.
