= The Filmmakers =

- Genre: Talk show
- Created by: CBC Arts
- Presented by: Johanna Schneller, Amanda Parris
- Country of origin: Canada
- No. of seasons: 2
- No. of episodes: 20

Production
- Running time: 30 minutes

Original release
- Network: CBC Television
- Release: July 22, 2017 – September 21, 2018

The Filmmakers is a half-hour Canadian talk show that premiered on CBC Television on July 22, 2017. Each episode focuses on a specific Canadian film which airs in full after the episode. It is produced by CBC Arts.

The first season was hosted by journalist Johanna Schneller and focused on "the greatest Canadian films and filmmakers of the last 20 years." Those films included The Sweet Hereafter, Stories We Tell, I Killed My Mother, Atanarjuat: The Fast Runner, Water, Incendies, War Witch and Manufactured Landscapes. Guests on the first season included creators, directors and artists like Xavier Dolan, Sarah Polley, Director X, Atom Egoyan, Mina Shum, Kim Nguyen, Don McKellar, Deepa Mehta, Zacharias Kunuk and Jennifer Baichwal, as well as guest panelists Connor Jessup, David Suzuki, Stephanie Morgenstern, Bob Martin, Eli Glasner, Samantha Wan, Emmanuel Jal, Elisapie Isaac, Cameron Bailey, Sook-Yin Lee, Peter Knegt, Edward Burtynsky, Nyla Innuksuk, Anita Lee, Cazhhmere and Sylvain Bellemare.

The second season saw Schneller joined by co-host Amanda Parris, and focus shifted to exclusively celebrate Canadian films directed by women. Films highlighted over the season included Meditation Park, Into the Forest, Gabrielle, Angry Inuk, Jean of the Joneses, Ava, Paper Year and Window Horses.

The series won the Canadian Screen Award for Best Talk or Entertainment Program or Series at the 7th Canadian Screen Awards.
