= From the Vaults (TV program) =

2018 Canadian television series

From the Vaults is a six-part Canadian television program that debuted November 15, 2018 on CBC Television, featuring performance and interview footage from the CBC Music archives.

Hosted by Amanda Parris and Tom Power, the program presented performance and interview clips of musicians, predominantly but not exclusively Canadian, who appeared on CBC Television programs from throughout the network's history. Early segments included archival footage of Sammy Davis Jr.'s 1959 solo special on Parade, Shania Twain's television debut on The Tommy Hunter Show, and Leonard Cohen's 1966 appearance on Take 30.
