= Richardson's ground squirrel =

- Inglewood Bird Sanctuary, Calgary, Alberta

Conservation status
- Least Concern (IUCN 3.1)

Scientific classification
- Kingdom: Animalia
- Phylum: Chordata
- Class: Mammalia
- Order: Rodentia
- Family: Sciuridae
- Genus: Urocitellus
- Species: U. richardsonii

Binomial name
- Urocitellus richardsonii (Sabine, 1822)

Synonyms
- Spermophilus richardsonii

Species of rodent

Richardson's ground squirrel (Urocitellus richardsonii), also known as the dakrat or flickertail, is a North American ground squirrel in the genus Urocitellus. Like a number of other ground squirrels, they are sometimes called prairie dogs or gophers, though the latter name belongs more strictly to the pocket gophers of family Geomyidae, and the former to members of the genus Cynomys.

== Taxonomy ==
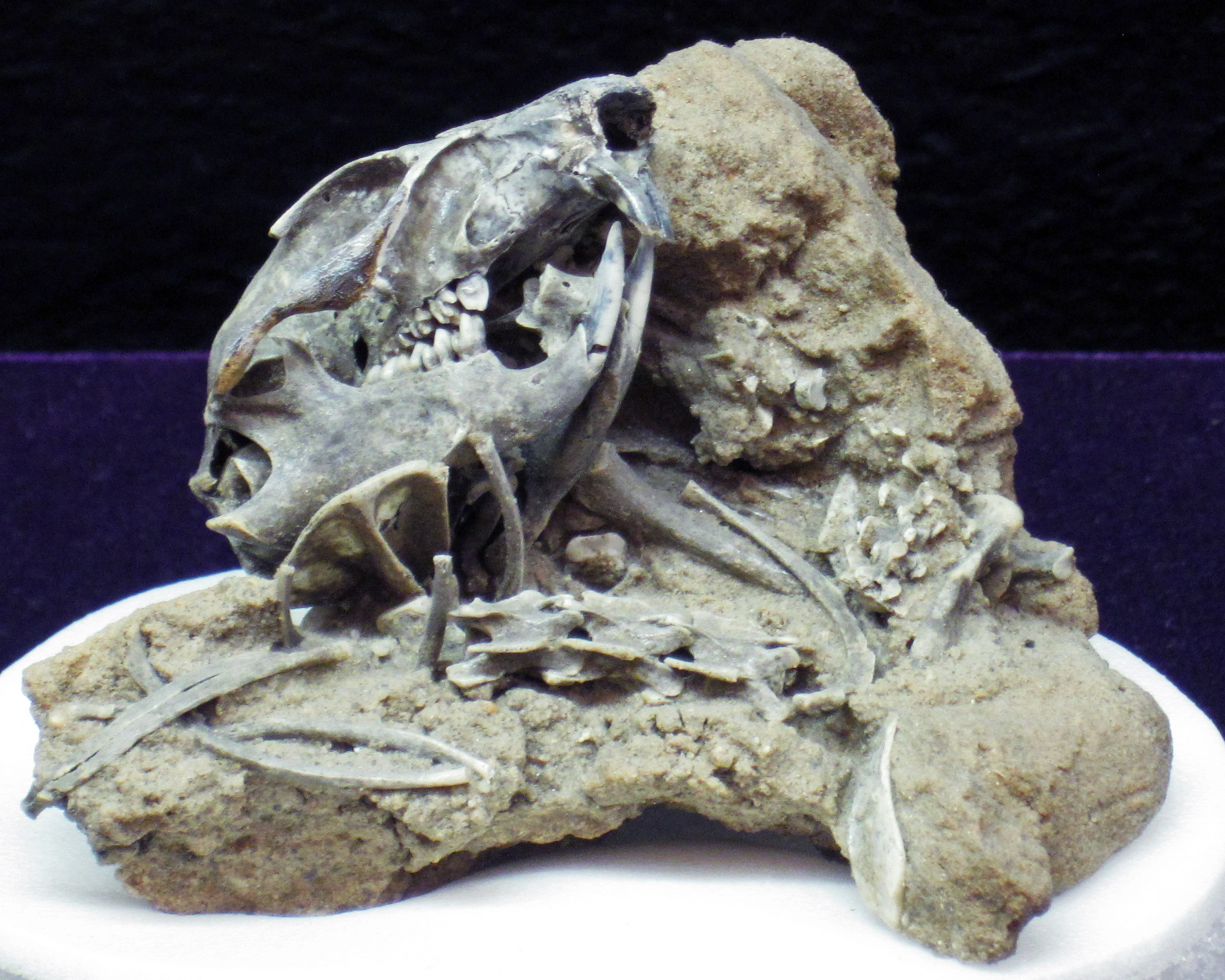
Fossil specimen from the Pleistocene of Nebraska

This squirrel was named after the Scottish naturalist Sir John Richardson. North Dakota is nicknamed the Flickertail state after the squirrel. The nickname Dakrat is derived from "Dakota Rat" and is a commonly used name around Minot, North Dakota and on Minot Air Force Base.

== Habitat ==
Richardson's ground squirrel is native to the prairie grasslands of the northern Great Plains. Its range includes southern Alberta, Saskatchewan and southwestern Manitoba in Canada, and Montana, North Dakota, South Dakota and Minnesota in the United States.

The species prefers open areas with low-growing vegetation but also occupies farmland and developed areas. It is common in towns and cities in Saskatchewan, where maintained lawns and other cleared areas can provide suitable habitat.

== Description ==
Typical adults are about 30 centimetres (12 in) long. Weights vary greatly with time of year and with location: at emergence from hibernation the squirrels weigh between 200 and 275 g (0.441–0.606 lb) for females and between 350 and 450 g (0.77–0.99 lb) for males. But by the time they hibernate again, their weight may have risen to nearly 750 grams (1.65 lb). Males are slightly larger and heavier than females on average. They are dark brown on the upper side and tan underneath. The tail is shorter and less bushy than in other ground squirrels, and the external ears are so short as to look more like holes in the animal's head. Behavior is more like that of a prairie dog than a typical ground squirrel. The tail is constantly trembling, so the animal is sometimes called the "flickertail".

In the wild, males have lower annual survival rates than females and rarely live beyond three years, while females may live five or six years. However, in captivity some individuals may live for five to seven years.

== Behavior ==
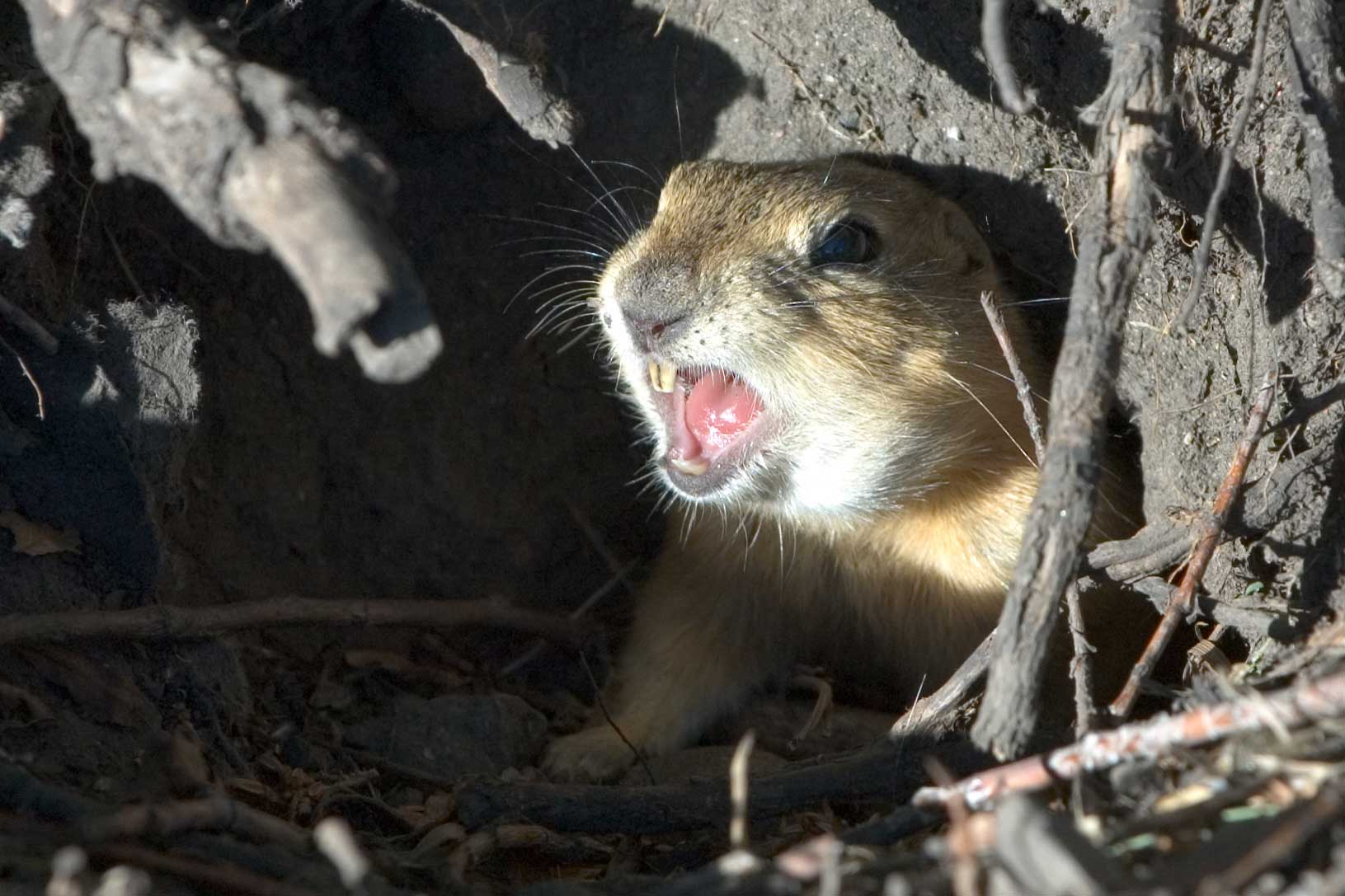
Exhibiting territorial behavior

Richardson's ground squirrels appear to live communally, but they organize their social structure around female kinship. A female Richardson's ground squirrel will tolerate the presence of closely related females, but are territorial towards other individuals. Individuals are territorial around their nest sites. The burrows of Richardson's ground squirrels are grouped closely together in colonies, and individuals give audible alarm calls when possible predators approach. Recent research has shown that in some cases, ultrasonic alarm calls are given, and are responded to by other members of the colony. Richardson's ground squirrels use two audible alarm calls, a high-pitched whistle and a 'chirp' call. The whistle is given in response to terrestrial predators, while the chirp is given in response to aerial predators such as hawks.

Predators include hawks, owls, snakes, weasels, American badgers and coyotes.

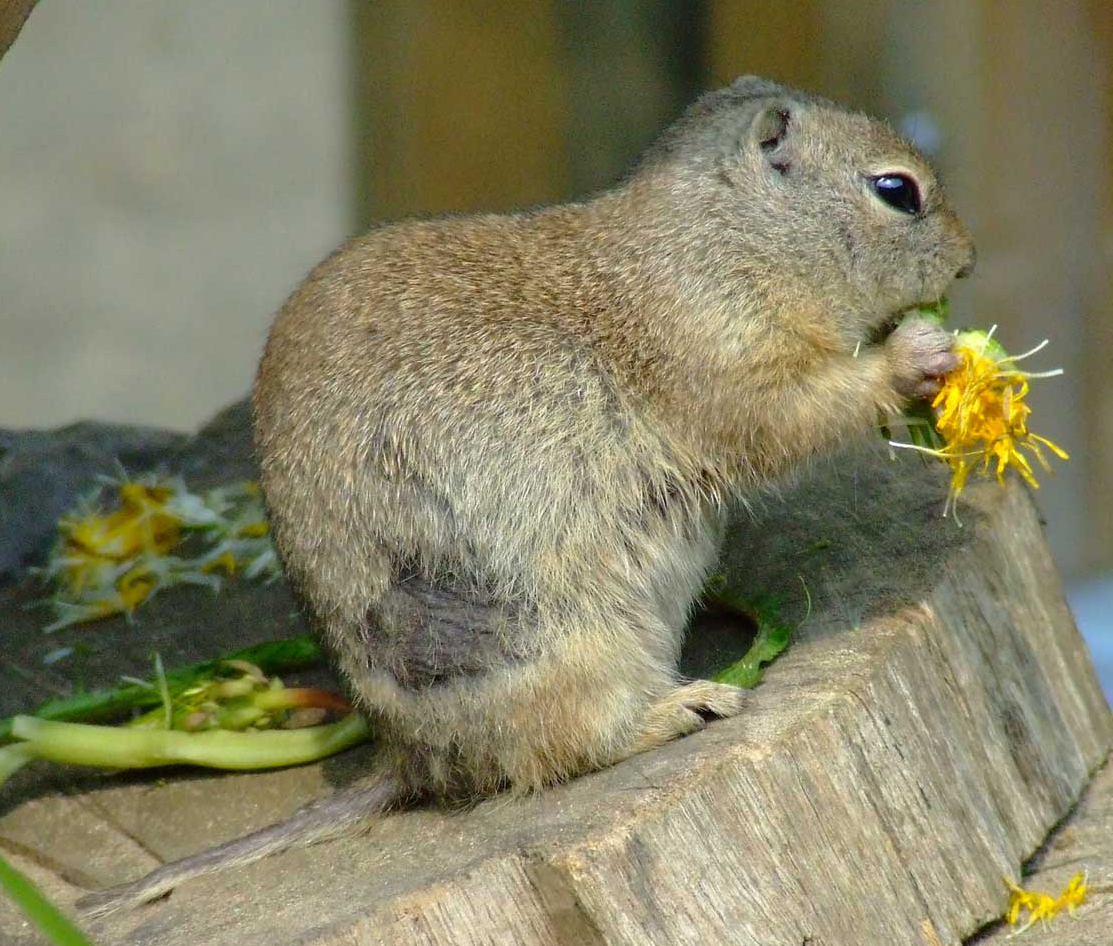
Eating a dandelion

=== Feeding ===
These animals are omnivores, eating seeds, nuts, grains, grasses and insects (especially crickets, caterpillars and grasshoppers). Males carry seeds underground in their cheek pouches and store them in their hibernation chambers, where they eat them before emerging in spring. They are also reported to cannibalize ground squirrels killed by road traffic.

=== Hibernation ===
In southern Alberta, adult Richardson's ground squirrels spend most of the year in hibernation, with an active season of approximately 110 days. Adult males enter hibernation between late May and late June, most before the summer solstice, while adult females enter by early July. Juvenile females enter hibernation in August, but juvenile males remain active until late September or mid-October, allowing them more time to grow. Adult males emerge from hibernation in mid-to-late February, generally two to three weeks before females.

Each squirrel hibernates alone in a spherical, grass-lined underground chamber, typically about 57 centimetres (22 in) below the surface. During hibernation, body temperature falls to near the surrounding soil temperature, and periods of torpor become longer as the soil cools, reaching their greatest duration in December and January. These periods are interrupted by brief awakenings lasting less than 24 hours. Males generally end torpor a week or more before emerging above ground, remaining in their chambers as they prepare physiologically for the breeding season.

=== Reproduction ===
Female Richardson's ground squirrels produce one litter per year. Litter size averages six, and the maximum size recorded is 14. The young are born in April or May. Young ground squirrels remain underground in the burrow until they are approximately 30 days old, emerging from natal burrows late May to mid-June. At emergence, the young weigh 50 to 100 grams.

== Relationship with humans ==
Because they will readily eat crop species, Richardson's ground squirrels are sometimes considered to be agricultural pests, although this is not their legal status in all jurisdictions. The government of Saskatchewan declared the animals pests in 2010, allowing local governments to employ gopher control measures. In areas with few natural predators, overpopulation and increasing density can drive ground squirrels to expand into suburban neighborhoods.

=== Control measures ===
Farmers and ranchers have developed a variety of ways to exterminate ground squirrels besides trapping, shooting and poisoning. One process fills the burrows with a mixture of oxygen and propane, and then ignites the gas mixture. This kills the ground squirrels with a concussive force that also collapses the tunnel systems. Even if effective, ground squirrels from outside of the treated areas eventually spread back into the area.

The Saskatoon Wildlife Federation sponsored a 12-week "gopher derby" in 2002, in an effort to reduce what it considered an overpopulation of the squirrels. Cash prizes were awarded for the most animals killed, with the animals' tails presented as proof of kill. The Canadian Humane Society described the contest as cruel and barbaric. Despite the criticism, the derby was repeated in 2003. By 2004, the ground squirrel population had dropped and the contest was cancelled.

The Gopher Hole Museum in Torrington, Alberta, Canada, has a large selection of stuffed ground squirrels of many varieties and colors.

=== Pet trade ===
The Richardson's ground squirrel in recent years has become popular in the exotic pet trade.
