= Dani Montalvo =

American actress

Dani Montalvo is an American actress. She is most noted for her performance as Lorena Bobbitt in the television film I Was Lorena Bobbitt, for which she was a Canadian Screen Award nominee for Best Actress in a Television Film or Miniseries at the 10th Canadian Screen Awards in 2022.

== Filmography ==
=== Film ===
Year	Title	Role	Notes
2017	And the Boys Go	Julie	
2018	Trust	Claire Robinson	

=== Television ===
Year	Title	Role	Notes
2018	Law & Order: Special Victims Unit	Grieving Female Student #1	Episode: "Man Down"
2020	Manifest	Student #1	Episode: "False Horizon"
2020	Dispatches from Elsewhere	Hipster Usher	Episode: "Janice"
2020	I Was Lorena Bobbitt	Lorena Bobbitt	Television film
2021	The Blacklist	Melissa Randall	Episode: "The Wellstone Agency (No. 127)"
2021	Mare of Easttown	Brianna's Friend	Episode: "Enter Number Two"
2022	Hello Tomorrow!	Phyllis Montez	3 episodes
2024	Law & Order: Special Victims Unit	Maria Recinos	Episode: "Probability of Doom"
