= Derailments (film) =

- Italian: Deragliamenti
- Directed by: Chelsea McMullan
- Written by: Chelsea McMullan
- Produced by: Derek Howard
- Starring: Milo Manara
- Cinematography: Derek Howard
- Edited by: Pablo Pastor
- Music by: Ted Bois
- Production company: Fabrica
- Release date: September 11, 2011 (TIFF)
- Running time: 11 minutes
- Country: Canada

Derailments (Italian: Deragliamenti) is a Canadian documentary film, directed by Chelsea McMullan and released in 2011. The film profiles Italian cartoonist Milo Manara, and his reminiscences about creating a comics version of Federico Fellini's unfinished film Il Viaggio di Mastorna detto Fernet.

The film was a Genie Award nominee for Best Short Documentary Film at the 32nd Genie Awards.
