= Exhibitionists (TV series) =

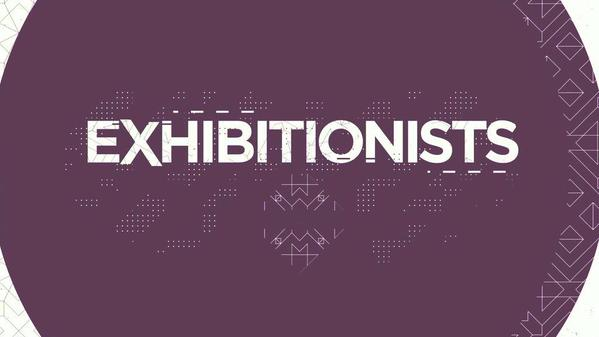
- Genre: Documentary series
- Created by: CBC Arts
- Presented by: Amanda Parris
- Country of origin: Canada
- No. of seasons: 6
- No. of episodes: 136

Production
- Executive producer: Andrew D'Cruz
- Producer: Romeo Candido
- Running time: 30 minutes

Original release
- Network: CBC Television
- Release: October 4, 2015 – November 20, 2020

Exhibitionists is a Canadian documentary series that premiered on CBC Television on October 4, 2015. Produced by CBC Arts, the program profiled Canadian and international artists working in a variety of artistic domains, including visual, performing, literary and musical arts.

The series was hosted by Amanda Parris.

== Featured artists ==
- Trey Anthony - playwright
- Margaret Atwood - writer
- Torquil Campbell - actor
- Director X - filmmaker
- Xavier Dolan - filmmaker
- Atom Egoyan - filmmaker
- Louise Lecavalier - dancer
- Ness Lee - artist
- Owen Pallett - musician
- Lido Pimienta - musician
- Djanet Sears - playwright
- Vivek Shraya - artist
- Alisi Telengut - animator
- Jacob Tremblay - actor
- Lena Waithe - writer
- Ai Weiwei - artist

== Awards ==
Award	Year	Category	Result	Ref(s)
Canadian Screen Awards	2018	Biography or Arts Documentary Program or Series	Nominated	
Canadian Screen Awards	2020	Biography or Arts Documentary Program or Series	Nominated	
Canadian Screen Awards	2021	Biography or Arts Documentary Program or Series	Nominated	
Canadian Screen Awards	2022	Biography or Arts Documentary Program or Series	Nominated	
Canadian Screen Awards	2022	Best Host, Talk Show or Entertainment News (Amanda Parris)	Won	
