= Tom Power (musician) =

Canadian musician and broadcaster (born 1987)

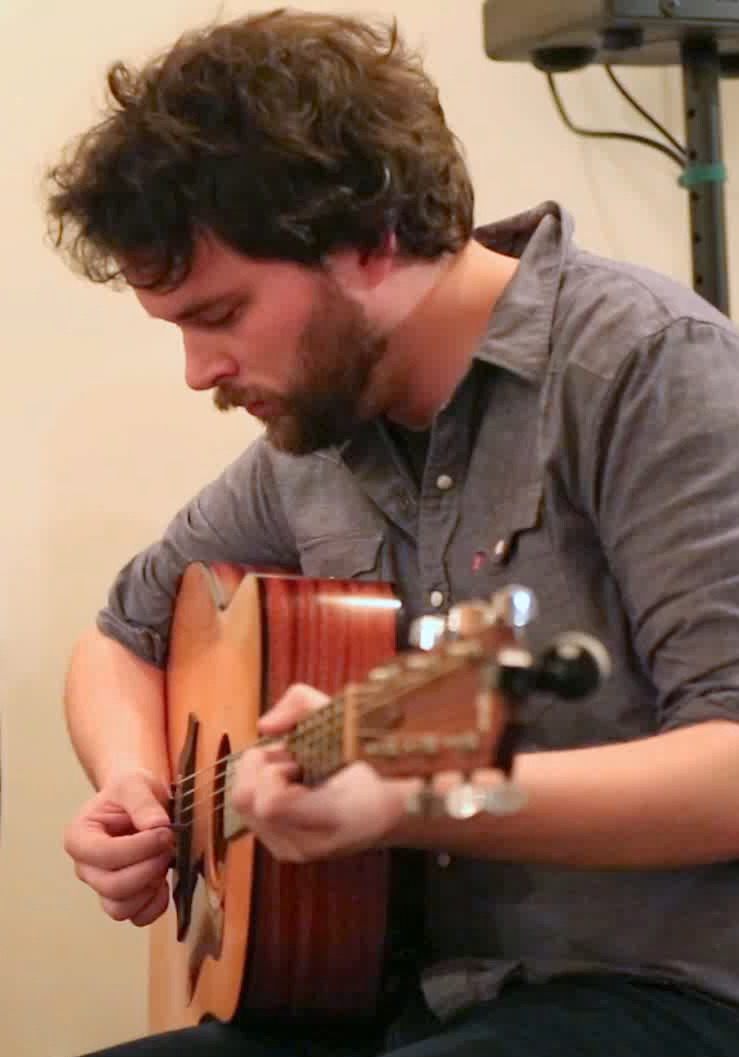
- Power in 2016
- Born: May 1, 1987 (age 39); St. John's, Newfoundland and Labrador, Canada
- Education: Memorial University
- Presenting career
- Show: Q
- Network: CBC Radio One
- Country: Canada

Tom Power (born May 1, 1987) is a Canadian musician and broadcaster, best known as the host of Q on CBC Radio One, previously the host of Deep Roots and Radio 2 Morning on CBC Radio 2. In August 2016, he was named as the permanent new host of Q, succeeding Shad.

Based in St. John's, Newfoundland and Labrador, Power began hosting Deep Roots in 2008 while he was a student of folklore at Memorial University of Newfoundland. Just 21 years old at the time, he was the youngest host of a national program on CBC Radio since Peter Jennings. After Bob Mackowycz's departure as host of Radio 2 Morning in July 2011, Power spent several weeks as the show's interim host before being named the permanent new host in November.

In 2018, he appeared on CBC Television as cohost with Amanda Parris of the music series From the Vaults.

Power is a member of the Polaris Music Prize jury, and has hosted numerous folk festivals, including the Hillside, Mariposa, Edmonton and Winnipeg festivals.

Power is a member of the award-winning folk band, The Dardanelles. His sister Erin Power is also a musician, who records and performs with the children's musical group The Swinging Belles.

In 2020, during the COVID-19 pandemic in Canada, Power hosted the CBC Television talk show What're You At? with Tom Power, which featured him interviewing both celebrities and ordinary Canadians remotely from his home studio.

Power was raised as a Catholic and left the faith due to Catholic Church sexual abuse cases in Canada, only returning to spirituality in the 2010s.
