= Other Side of the Game =

2017 play by Amanda Parris

- Written by: Amanda Parris

Premiere
- Date: October 14, 2017
- Place: Aki Studio Theatre, Toronto, Canada

Other Side of the Game is a 2017 play by Amanda Parris. It won the Governor General's Award for English-language drama in 2019.

== Synopsis ==
Other Side of the Game follows Beverly, a student in 1970s Toronto who becomes involved with Black activists organizing in the civil rights movement, and Nicole in contemporary Toronto who, while at a basketball court with her ex-boyfriend, is stopped by police.

== Development ==
Parris was inspired to write the play after visiting a friend at the Don Jail in Toronto. She noticed the majority of the people in the waiting room were women and began speaking to them. Other Side of the Game is Parris' first play. She initially wrote the play envisioning herself performing it, but was encouraged by dramaturge, Marjorie Chan, to explore alternate versions of the play without herself as a performer.

== Productions ==
Other Side of the Game premiered in October 2017 at Aki Studio Theatre in Toronto as a co-production from Obsidian Theatre and Cahoots Theatre, directed by Nigel Shawn Williams. The production starred Virgilia Griffith, Ordena Stephens-Thompson, Shakura Dickson, Peter Bailey, and Ryan Rosery, and was choreographed by Jasmyn Fyffe.

== Adaptation ==
In 2019, Other Side of the Game was adapted as an audio drama in three parts for the PlayME podcast.

== Awards and nominations ==
The play was published by Playwrights Canada Press in 2019 and won the Governor General's Award for English-language drama that year.
