= Our Dance of Revolution =

- Directed by: Phillip Pike
- Written by: Phillip Pike
- Produced by: Phillip Pike
- Starring: Angela Robertson; Rinaldo Walcott
- Cinematography: Jack Weisman
- Edited by: Eugene Weis
- Music by: Gavin Bradley
- Production company: Roaring River Films
- Release date: April 29, 2019 (Hot Docs)
- Running time: 102 minutes
- Country: Canada
- Language: English

Our Dance of Revolution is a Canadian documentary film, directed by Phillip Pike and released in 2019. The film profiles the history of LGBTQ community and activism in the Black Canadian community in Toronto, from the 1970s through to the 2016 incident when the Toronto chapter of Black Lives Matter shut down the Pride Toronto parade to call attention to racism in the LGBTQ community.

Key stories profiled in the film include the activism of figures such as Makeda Silvera, Rinaldo Walcott, Angela Robertson and Douglas Stewart, organizations such as Sister Vision Press, the Black Coalition for AIDS Prevention, the Black Women's Collective, Blockorama, Sunset Service and Zami, and cultural figures such as DJ Black Cat and Michelle Ross.

The film premiered at the 2019 Hot Docs Canadian International Documentary Festival.
