= Sean O'Neill (actor) =

Canadian actor & producer (born 1985)

Sean O'Neill (born January 21, 1985, in Hamilton, Ontario) is a Canadian producer and television personality. From 2015 to 2017, O'Neill was the host of the CBC Television art challenge show Crash Gallery, and in 2018 he co-created the CBC Television documentary series In the Making, which he executive produced and hosted.

He is the former director of public programs and partnerships at the Art Gallery of Ontario, where he developed projects including First Thursdays and AGO Creative Minds at Massey Hall.

O'Neill was an actor as a child, and appeared in various Canadian film and television productions including Baby Blues, Never Cry Werewolf and Degrassi: The Next Generation.

In 2020 O'Neill created an arts focussed production company Visitor Media and in association with the National Ballet of Canada produced the documentary Crystal Pite: Angels' Atlas which premiered at the Vancouver International Film Festival in 2022.

== Filmography ==
Year	Title	Role	Note
1998	Real Kids, Real Adventures	Derek	Episode: "Apartment Rescue"
1998	The Famous Jett Jackson	Nic Twitty	Episode: Vootle-Muck-a-Heeve
1999	Jenny and the Queen of Light	Jim	
2000	Common Ground	Barber Shop Boy	
2001	In a Heartbeat	Keith	Episode: "Hero"
2004	Prom Queen: The Marc Hall Story	Pretty Boy	
2004	Doc	Don	Episode: The Last Ride (2004)
2005	Show Me Yours	Will	Episode: The F-Word (2005)
2005	Queer as Folk	Keith	Episode: #5.3 (2005), #5.4 (2005)
2005	1-800-Missing	Brad Curry	Episode: Last Night (2005)
2008	Degrassi: The Next Generation	Robson	Episode: Didn't We Almost Have It All (2008)
2008	The Cross Road	Paul	
2008	Never Cry Werewolf	Steven Kepkie	
2008	Baby Blues	Max	
2015	Crash Gallery	Host	
2018	In the Making	Host, Executive Producer	
2022	Lido TV	Producer	
2022	Crystal Pite: Angels' Atlas	Producer	
2023	Swan Song	Producer, writer	

== Awards ==
- Monaco International Film Festival Angel Award (2008), The Cross Road, Best Ensemble Cast
