= Torrington, Alberta =

Torrington
- Hamlet
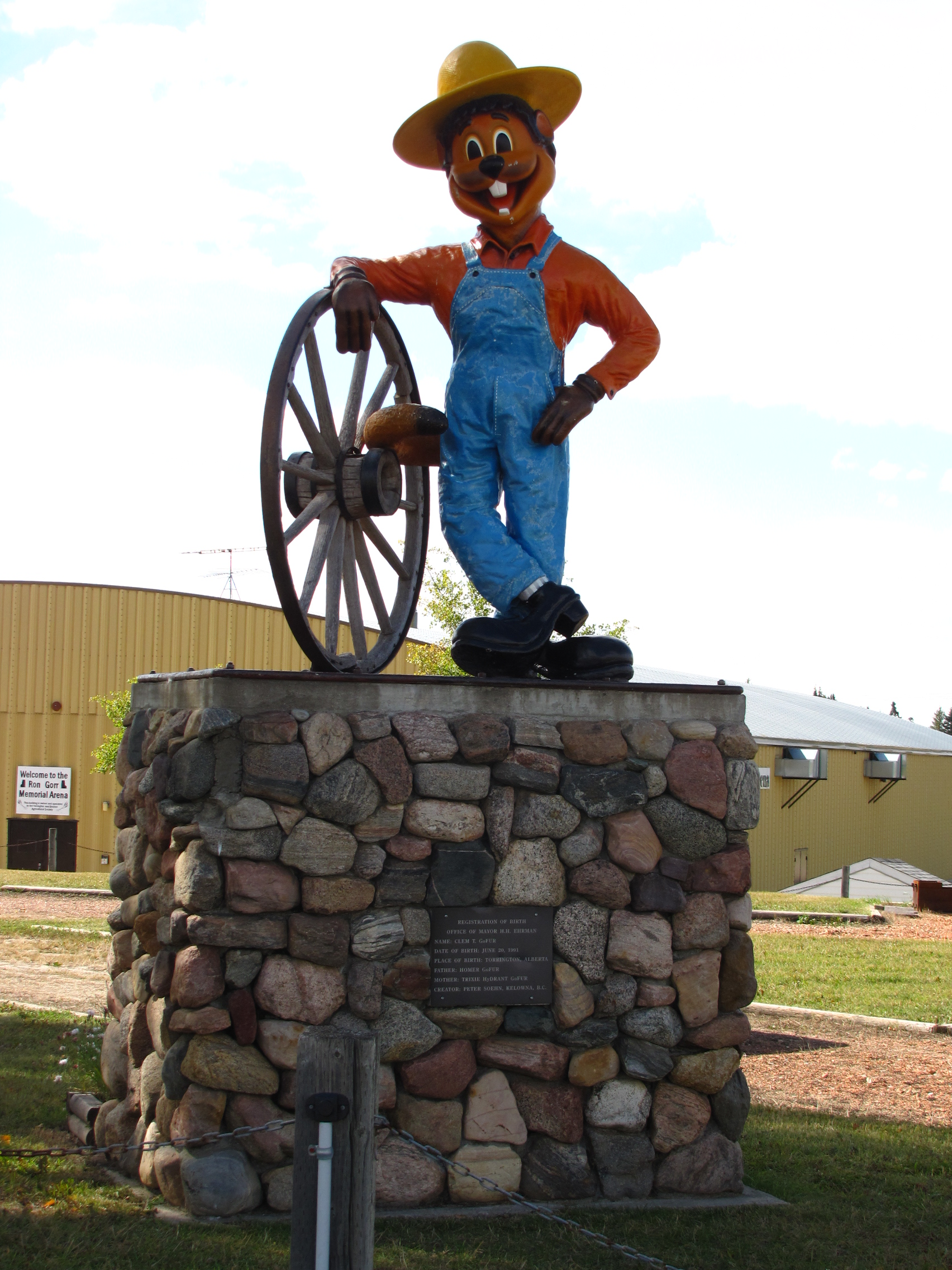
- Clem T. GoFur

- Location of Torrington in Alberta
- Coordinates: 51.7914°N 113.6058°W
- Country: Canada
- Province: Alberta
- Census division: No. 5
- Municipal district: Kneehill County

Government
  - Type: Unincorporated
  - Governing body: Kneehill County Council

Area (2021)
  - Land: 0.4 km^{2} (0.15 sq mi)
- Elevation: 950 m (3,120 ft)

Population (2021)
  - Total: 239
- Time zone: UTC−06:00 (Alberta Time)

Torrington is a hamlet in central Alberta, Canada within Kneehill County. It is approximately 160 kilometres (99 mi) northeast of Calgary at the junction of Highway 27 and Highway 805.

The hamlet is located in Census Division No. 5 and in the federal riding of Crowfoot.

The main industry is agriculture.

The community is home to the Gopher Hole Museum, dedicated to stuffed Richardson's ground squirrels (technically not gophers) in anthropomorphic taxidermy settings.

A very large outdoor gopher sculpture (12 ft high) named "Clem T. GoFur" is located in the village.

All 11 of Torrington's fire hydrants were painted to look like gophers.

Torrington was incorporated as a village until 1997, when it dissolved to hamlet status under the jurisdiction of Kneehill County.

== Demographics ==
In the 2021 Census of Population conducted by Statistics Canada, Torrington had a population of 239 living in 110 of its 119 total private dwellings, a change of 18.9% from its 2016 population of 201. With a land area of 0.4 km^{2} (0.15 sq mi), it had a population density of 597.5/km^{2} (1,547.5/sq mi) in 2021.

As a designated place in the 2016 Census of Population conducted by Statistics Canada, Torrington had a population of 170 living in 83 of its 89 total private dwellings, a change of −5% from its 2011 population of 179. With a land area of 0.63 km^{2} (0.24 sq mi), it had a population density of 269.8/km^{2} (698.9/sq mi) in 2016.

== See also ==
- List of communities in Alberta
- List of designated places in Alberta
- List of former urban municipalities in Alberta
- List of hamlets in Alberta
