= Ever Deadly =

2022 Canadian documentary film

- Directed by: Chelsea McMullan; Tanya Tagaq
- Written by: Tanya Tagaq; Chelsea McMullan
- Produced by: Lea Marin; Kate Vollum
- Starring: Tanya Tagaq
- Cinematography: Alejandro Coronado
- Edited by: Avril Jacobson
- Music by: Jesse Zubot
- Production company: National Film Board of Canada
- Release date: September 9, 2022 (TIFF)
- Running time: 90 minutes
- Country: Canada
- Language: English

Ever Deadly is a 2022 Canadian documentary film, directed by Chelsea McMullan and Tanya Tagaq. The film is a portrait of Tagaq's life and career as a musician and activist.

== Release ==
Ever Deadly premiered at the Toronto International Film Festival on September 9, 2022. The film made its online streaming premiere on June 1, 2023, through TVO's website and YouTube channel.

On the review aggregator website Rotten Tomatoes, 86% of seven critics' reviews are positive, with an average rating of 7.5/10.
