= Makeda Silvera =

Jamaican Canadian novelist and short story writer

Makeda Silvera (/may-kduh sil-ver-uh/; born in 1955) is a Jamaican Canadian novelist and short story writer.

== Early life ==
Silvera was born in Kingston, Jamaica. Her family immigrated to Toronto when she was 12 years old. Silvera grew up in a strict Caribbean family and was not allowed to socialize with the other children outside her home. This allowed Silvera to develop a strong love of reading. When she did socialize it was during family gatherings and extra-curricular activities centered around her family. Silvera has briefly talked about seeing “many faces of motherhood” and dealing with an “absentee mother”.

== Career ==
As a teenager, Silvera did community work. Her first job was at Toronto’s Contrast, where she was a typesetter. At the time the only job available to women at the newspaper was to be a typesetter. She worked her way up to the news and started covering domestic workers. Eventually her editor said she needed to change her focus because she could no longer write about domestic workers without a clear objective. She left the newspaper after that discussion. This was not because she was mad but because she agreed. Silvera needed a fresh start which she found at Share Magazine, where was an assistant editor and wrote a column called Women’s Lips. Women’s Lips played into the stereotypes of the owner of Share. Silvera had continued writing about domestic workers which inspired her first book, Silenced: Talks with Working Class West Indian Women about Their Lives and Struggle, which was about black domestic workers in Canada. She continued doing community work throughout her professional career and worked at a summer program pertaining to black education. In 1983 Silvera started working at Fireweed, which was a feminist periodical in Canada, that was founded in 1978 and published women’s writings about art, politics, and culture. Silvera was the only black woman working at Fireweed. Issue 16 was the first issue that focused on women of color. She stayed a number of years to hone her skills. While working at Fireweed, she also worked a hotline for black youth and volunteered at the first Immigrant Women Center. In 1983, Silvera was invited to the first Women and Word’s Conference in Vancouver as one of the four keynote speakers. During the conference she was supposed to speak about how far women writers have come and Silvera talked about how they have not come very far, especially black women writers. She overheard a well-established white woman writer saying that black women should start their own presses and journals and stop complaining. When she returned to Toronto she started preparations to create and found Sister Vision.

After Silvera had worked at Fireweed for seven years, she asked if she could borrow office space. Silvera was frustrated when publishers would not print her book, Silenced: Talks with Working Class Caribbean Women about Their Lives and Struggle as Domestic Workers in Canada, since various manuscripts were transcribed in Creole. There was a reluctance to print the writing of black women since society deemed stories to be ‘too angry,’ and ‘autobiographical.’ Silvera and her partner at the time Stephanie Martin, a visual artist, faced even more issues when attempting to get published since they were lesbians of color. They decided to take things into their own hands and co-founded Sister Vision Press in 1985. Silvera and Martin decided on the name Sister Vision Press instead of Martin-Silvera, since they felt other authors in similar positions would relate to their struggle and share their vision. Despite Silvera referring to herself and Martin as “crazy,” since they had very little knowledge about publishing and were both working full-time jobs, they were able to make small successes and outgrew their office space at Fireweed. They moved Sister Vision into the basement of their home, 101 Dewson Street, in Toronto. Silvera eventually quit her job at Fireweed and dedicated her time to working to co-found the 101 Dewson Street Collective House and Sister Vision Press. They held Sister Vision’s first book launch party in their living room and their house started to double as a Black queer activist collective. The first book published was called Speshal Rikwes. Silvera and Martin wanted to start with a book that would prove their intention to publish writers in their native language. They published work written by authors at various levels of experience. Also novels were not the only thing being published, Sister Vision published books on theory, history, dramas, anthologies, young adult, children’s books, and poetry. Silvera states she thought their anthologies were most successful. She enjoys how they have given a voice to a diversity of women. The anthology Miscegenation Blues: Voices of Mixed Race Women was a risky piece since something of its nature had never been published in Canada before. Makeda speaks about the anthology with pride and believes it was an “innovative” piece. Silvera published seven works with Sister Vision, including Sapodilla:The Sister Vision Book of Lesbian Poetry (an anthology she published with Stephanie Martin), which was Sister Vision’s final published work. After publishing over 50 titles the press ceased operations in 2001.

As an out lesbian, she wrote many queer-focused material, including Piece of My Heart (1991), the first North American anthology of literature by lesbians of colour. Piece of My Heart was described in the Canadian Journal of Women and the Law as "a landmark collection of disparate lesbian voices. By combining reprinted material by such renowned lesbian writers as Audre Lorde, Cheryl Clarke, Jewell L. Gomez, Chrystos, and Barbara Smith with work by such thought-provoking new writers as Raymina Y. Mays, Karin Aguilar-San Juan, Milagros Paredes, and Nice Rodriguez, Silvera creates an enduring testimony to the inextricable connection between literature and social activism for innumerable multi-ethnic and multi-racial lesbians. Silvera published her first collection of short stories, Piece of My Heart, with Sister Vision in 1991. After this publication she decided that if she wrote a work of fiction she would want to publish it elsewhere. When she wrote Her Head a Village she decided to publish it with Press Gang in 1994. Silvera stated that it is very challenging to publish your own work and self-promote the book. Therefore, she wanted to be looked after and experience the challenge that comes with a publishing house editing and promoting your work. Unfortunately, Press Gang went under so Silvera offered her novel The Heart Does Not Bend to Random House in 2002 and they enjoyed the story and wanted to publish it.

She was prominently profiled as a key builder of LGBTQ Black Canadian culture in the 2019 documentary film Our Dance of Revolution.

== Personal life ==
She currently lives in Toronto. Silvera has two children and is now a grandmother. Silvera has not talked much about motherhood publicly; however she has said when she became a mother she did not feel like she could no longer be a sexual being. She did not think she had to give up that part of herself when she became a mother. She raised her two children, Ayoola and Keisha, at the 101 Dewson Street Collective House with her then partner, Stephaine Martin. Ayoola was ten when Sister Vision was founded and says growing up at 101 Dewson was an "unconventional" way to grow up. Most of the house was home to lesbian mothers and their children. Aooyla said this environment led the kids to grow up with a "kaleidoscopic" view of the world. By age 14 she would transcribe hard copies to floppy discs. Everyone at 101 Dewson had a role to play in order to make Sister Vision Press successful. Silvera is currently sick due to a form of parkinsonian disorder called corticobasal syndrome. She was not able to attend the conference celebrating 40 years of Sister Vision held on September 25, 2025 at McMaster University. Her daughter, Ayoola Silvera, spoke on her behalf and her granddaughter was in attendance.

== Awards ==
In 1992, Silvera was named a Stonewall Literature Finalist for Piece of My Heart: A Lesbian of Color Anthology. Piece of My Heart: A Lesbian of Color Anthology was also named a Gay and Lesbian Book Awards Finalist in 1992. In 2003, Silvera’s novel The Heart Will Not Bend was named a finalist for the Toronto Book Awards.

== Bibliography ==
Novels

- The Revenge of Maria (1999)
- The Heart Does Not Bend (2002)

Short Fiction Collection

- Remembering G and Other Stories (1991)
- Her Head: A Village by Makeda Silvera (1994)
- Pearls of Passion: A Treasury of Lesbian Erotica
- Ma-ka: diasporic juks: contemporary writing by queers of African descent (1997)
- The Oxford Book of Caribbean Short Stories (1999)

Short Stories

- Man Royals and Sodomites: Some Thoughts on the Invisibility of Afro-Caribbean Lesbians (1992)

Non-Fiction

- Silenced: Talks with working class West Indian women about their lives and struggles as domestic workers in Canada (1983)
- Fireworks (1986)
- The Issue Is ‘ism: Women of Colour Speak Out (1989)
- Growing Up Black: A Resource Manual for Black Youths (1989)
- Piece of My Heart: A Lesbian of Colour Anthology (1991)
- The Other Woman: Women of Colour in Contemporary Canadian Literature (1995)

Poetry

- Sapodilla: The Sister Vision Book of Lesbian Poetry (1999)
