= Jaik Puppyteeth =

Canadian artist

- Born: Jaik Olson; Kootenays, British Columbia, Canada
- Style: Comic art, portraits, retro
- Movement: Visual arts
- Website: puppyteeth.com

Jaik Puppyteeth (also known as Jaik Olson) is a Canadian artist and also writes for Vice magazine.

Puppyteeth released his graphic novel Pop about a grumpy clown on Friday the 13th in April 2018 along with a live art show and discussion at Portland State University.

He is also known for his portraits of drag queens.

== Moniker origins ==
CBC Arts wrote "Puppyteeth — whose moniker is derived from the artist's early fixation on drawing people who have really large gums and jagged, tiny teeth — says he's ultimately most proud of the fact that he has been able to support himself through his art, and that it has resonated with so many people." Puppyteeth added "Young queers often reach out to ask questions and advice, and I am always happy to be there for them."

== Critical reception ==
The Georgia Straight wrote in 2024 "The art of Jaik Olson is as humorous as it is morbid—as twisted as it is beautiful. The multidisciplinary artist behind Puppyteeth Studios uses signatures of bold colours, loping lines, and well-placed cynicism to create paintings and prints that transcend their own boundaries. And clearly it’s working: Olson took home the number-one spot in this year’s Best of Vancouver awards visual artist category. Here’s hoping he paints something deliciously weird about it."

Out magazine wrote "You've probably seen Jaik Puppyteeth's vibrant, oft-unsettling pieces already on social media--that is, if you happen to follow any of the world's most prominent drag personalities, like Trixie Mattel, Katya, or Miz Cracker, all of whom are among those that have shared the artist's work on their respective platforms."

Them said "Unsettling and humorous, his work is a giddy mangling of retro visual tropes that harken back to the suffocating wholesomeness of the 1950s.
