= My Prairie Home (album) =

Studio album by Rae Spoon
- Released: 2013
- Producer: Lorrie Matheson; Rae Spoon

Rae Spoon chronology
I Can't Keep All of Our Secrets (2012)	My Prairie Home (2013)

My Prairie Home is an album by Canadian singer-songwriter Rae Spoon, released in 2013. Written and recorded as a soundtrack to the documentary film My Prairie Home, the album was a longlisted nominee for the 2014 Polaris Music Prize.

The album draws extensively on Spoon's Christian religious upbringing. In the lead track "Amy Grant", Spoon wishes to have known of Freddie Mercury in childhood rather than Amy Grant, while album closer "Can't Tear It From Me" is a reminiscence of Spoon's grandmother.

For the album, Spoon pulled back from the overt electronic music elements that have defined their musical style since 2008's superioryouareinferior, instead reverting to styles more reminiscent of their childhood influences, such as country, folk, gospel and rock, although the album still makes some use of sampling and electronic processing.

The album was recorded at co-producer Lorrie Matheson's studio in Calgary, Alberta.

== Track listing ==
1. "Amy Grant" (2:22)
2. "Sunday Dress" (2:59)
3. "Glacier Step" (1:21)
4. "This Used to Be the Bottom of an Ocean" (3:05)
5. "Moving Bus" (1:54)
6. "I Will Be a Wall" (3:01)
7. "Airplane Home" (1:07)
8. "Cowboy" (2:47)
9. "Grass, Sky, Wind" (0:40)
10. "Love Is a Hunter" (3:11)
11. "How Do You Run" (3:39)
12. "Truck Chase" (0:51)
13. "Snake in the Water" (2:26)
14. "Church" (1:28)
15. "I Want" (2:58)
16. "Tyrrell" (1:14)
17. "God Was on Your Shoulders" (2:48)
18. "Birds Take Off" (1:08)
19. "Can't Tear It From Me" (2:51)
