= Amanda Parris =

Canadian broadcaster and writer

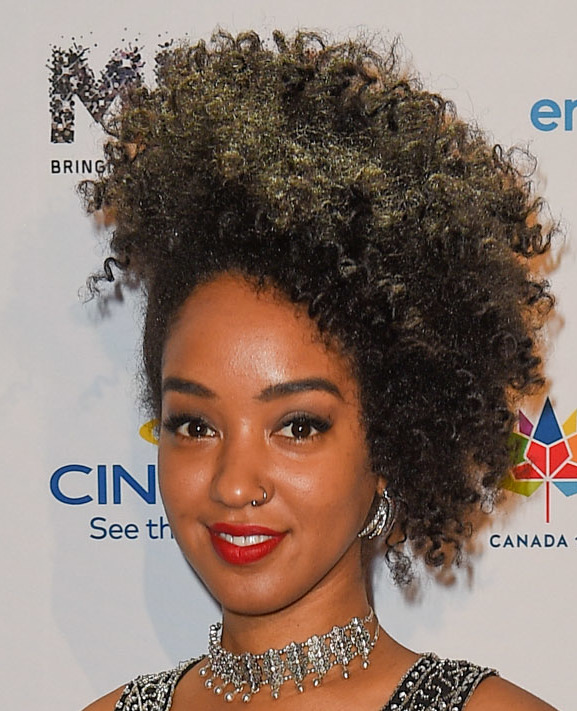
- Occupations: writer, radio and television broadcaster
- Known for: Exhibitionists, Revenge of the Black Best Friend

Amanda Parris is a Canadian broadcaster and writer. An arts reporter and producer for the Canadian Broadcasting Corporation, she hosts the CBC Television series The Filmmakers and has hosted the CBC Television series Exhibitionists and From the Vaults and the CBC Music radio series Marvin's Room. She was cohost with Tom Power of the 2016 Polaris Music Prize ceremony. She writes the weekly column Black Light for CBC Arts.

Other Side of the Game, her debut as a theatrical playwright, was staged by Toronto's Obsidian Theatre and Cahoots Theatre in 2017. After it was published in book form, it won the Governor General's Award for English-language drama at the 2019 Governor General's Awards. Other Side of the Game was adapted by the theatre podcast PlayME and released in three parts on February 24, 2021.

The Death News, written by Amanda Parris and directed by Charles Officer, is a short, filmed, stage monodrama set in the near-future where premature Black death is an inevitability. Commissioned by Mumbi Tindyebwa Otu, Obsidian Theatres' artistic director, for 21 Black Futures, an anthology series featuring 21 Black playwrights which began streaming on CBC Gem in February 2021. The Death News responds to the question "What is the future of Blackness?" Parris was inspired by TV and radio broadcasts in Grenada, where hosts provide information on who has died and funeral details. Parris imagined her work as a tool of resistance to mainstream media and its failure to tell nuanced stories of Black people.

Prior to joining the CBC, Parris co-founded Lost Lyrics with Natasha Daniels, an arts education program that used theatre, dance, poetry, film and music to reach youth at risk of dropping out of school.

In 2022, she was named alongside Kathleen Newman-Bremang and Kayla Grey as one of the recipients of the Academy of Canadian Cinema and Television's inaugural Changemaker Award at the 10th Canadian Screen Awards. She also received a nomination for Best Host, Talk Show or Entertainment News as the host of Exhibitionists, and won the award for Best Writing in a Web Program or Series for "The Death News".

In 2022 she created the comedy web series Revenge of the Black Best Friend. In 2024 she launched For the Culture with Amanda Parris, a documentary series in which she profiles issues in Black culture.
