= Siahar =

- village
- Location in Punjab, India
- Coordinates: 30.69°N 75.91°E
- Country: India
- State: Punjab
- District: Ludhiana

Government
  - Type: Panchyat

Languages
  - Official: Punjabi
- Time zone: UTC+5:30 (IST)
- PIN: 141117
- Telephone code: 0161

Siahar is a village in Ludhiana district, Punjab, India, located in Payal tehsil. Punjabi is the local language, and the area straddles the border of Ludhiana and Sangrur districts. Village Siahar is approximately 175 km from Amritsar International Airport and about 50 km from Halwara Domestic Airport.

The village's most notable historical association is with Guru Hargobind Sahib, the sixth Sikh Guru. After the Battle of Mehraj, Guru Hargobind Sahib arrived at the village while travelling from Rara to Jagerah. The Guru's horse, named Dilbagh, had been wounded in the battle and died there.

Siahar is also recognized as the birthplace of Sant Mihan Singh. The Shri Nanaksar Ashram (Thath Siahar), a gurdwara built in his honor, marks his birthplace and remains an active spiritual site today.

== Economy ==
Siahar is known for manufacturing chaff-cutter machines, which are supplied across India.

Nearby villages include Rosiana, Pandher Kheri, Hans, Zirakh, and Bhikhi Khattra, while nearby towns include Ahmedgarh, Malerkotla, Ludhiana, and Khanna.

== Demographics ==
Village has 7 pattis (local areas)

- Raju
- Bhogi
- Allo
- Mayia
- lodhi
- Hasna
- Boora

== Education ==
- Government Senior Secondary School
- Government Girls High School
- Good Earth school
- Guru Nanak Public School
- Kidzee School

== Banks ==
Two banks operate in Siahar:

- Indian Overseas bank
- Cooperative Bank

== Facilities ==
- Telephone Exchange
- Post Office
- Electric Sub Station
- Petrol Pump
- Public Health Center
- Grain Market and gosal medical store
- Play Ground
- Gym
- Library
