= What're You At? with Tom Power =

Canadian television talk show

- Genre: Talk show
- Presented by: Tom Power
- Country of origin: Canada

Original release
- Network: CBC Television
- Release: April 5, 2020

What're You At? with Tom Power is a Canadian television talk show, which premiered April 5, 2020 on CBC Television. Introduced as a special series during the COVID-19 pandemic in Canada, the series features broadcaster Tom Power remotely interviewing both celebrities and ordinary Canadians from his home studio. The premiere episode included an interview with Dan Levy about the series finale of Schitt's Creek, a musical performance by Jessie Reyez, and a panel discussion with three first responders about efforts to manage the pandemic crisis.

The series takes its name from a common greeting in Newfoundland and Labrador, which Power describes as meaning "How are you?" or "How are you holding up?"
