= My Prairie Home (film) =

- Promotional poster
- Directed by: Chelsea McMullan
- Written by: Chelsea McMullan
- Produced by: Lea Marin
- Starring: Rae Spoon
- Cinematography: Maya Bankovic; Derek Howard
- Edited by: Avril Jacobson
- Music by: Rae Spoon
- Production company: National Film Board of Canada
- Release date: September 29, 2013 (Vancouver IFF)
- Running time: 77 minutes
- Country: Canada
- Language: English

My Prairie Home is a 2013 Canadian documentary film about transgender singer/songwriter Rae Spoon, directed by Chelsea McMullan. It features musical performances and interviews about Spoon's troubled childhood, raised by Pentecostal parents obsessed with the Rapture and an abusive father, as well as Spoon's past experiences with gender dysphoria. The film was shot in the Canadian Prairies, including the Royal Tyrrell Museum of Palaeontology in Drumheller. My Prairie Home was produced by Lea Marin for the National Film Board of Canada (NFB).

McMullan has said she first found out about Spoon around 2007, when she was making a western-themed NFB film set in the B.C. Interior. She was searching for "subversive" country-folk soundtrack music when someone suggested Spoon. According to Spoon, the idea for the documentary came out of a discussion with McMullan in 2010 about the musician's perceived lack of marketability, a criticism Spoon sometimes receives when applying for music video funding.

Spoon has stated that it had initially been difficult for to open up so much about personal details, so McMullan suggested writing it down before they talked. Spoon did so, and ended up writing the book First Spring Grass Fire, which was published in the fall of 2012. The book was a nominee for the 2013 Lambda Literary Awards in the Transgender Fiction category, and Spoon was awarded an Honour of Distinction from the Dayne Ogilvie Prize for LGBT writers in 2014.

== Release ==
My Prairie Home premiered at the Vancouver International Film Festival in September 2013 and began a Canadian theatrical run in November of that same year. The documentary debuted in the US at the Sundance Film Festival in January 2014. During its Sundance run, the National Film Board also made the film available for free streaming to Canadian audiences.

The film was a shortlisted nominee for the Canadian Screen Award for Best Feature Length Documentary at the 2nd Canadian Screen Awards.

The film was accompanied by a soundtrack album, also titled My Prairie Home, which was a longlisted nominee for the 2014 Polaris Music Prize.

== See also ==
- List of LGBT films directed by women
