= Johanna Schneller =

Canadian journalist

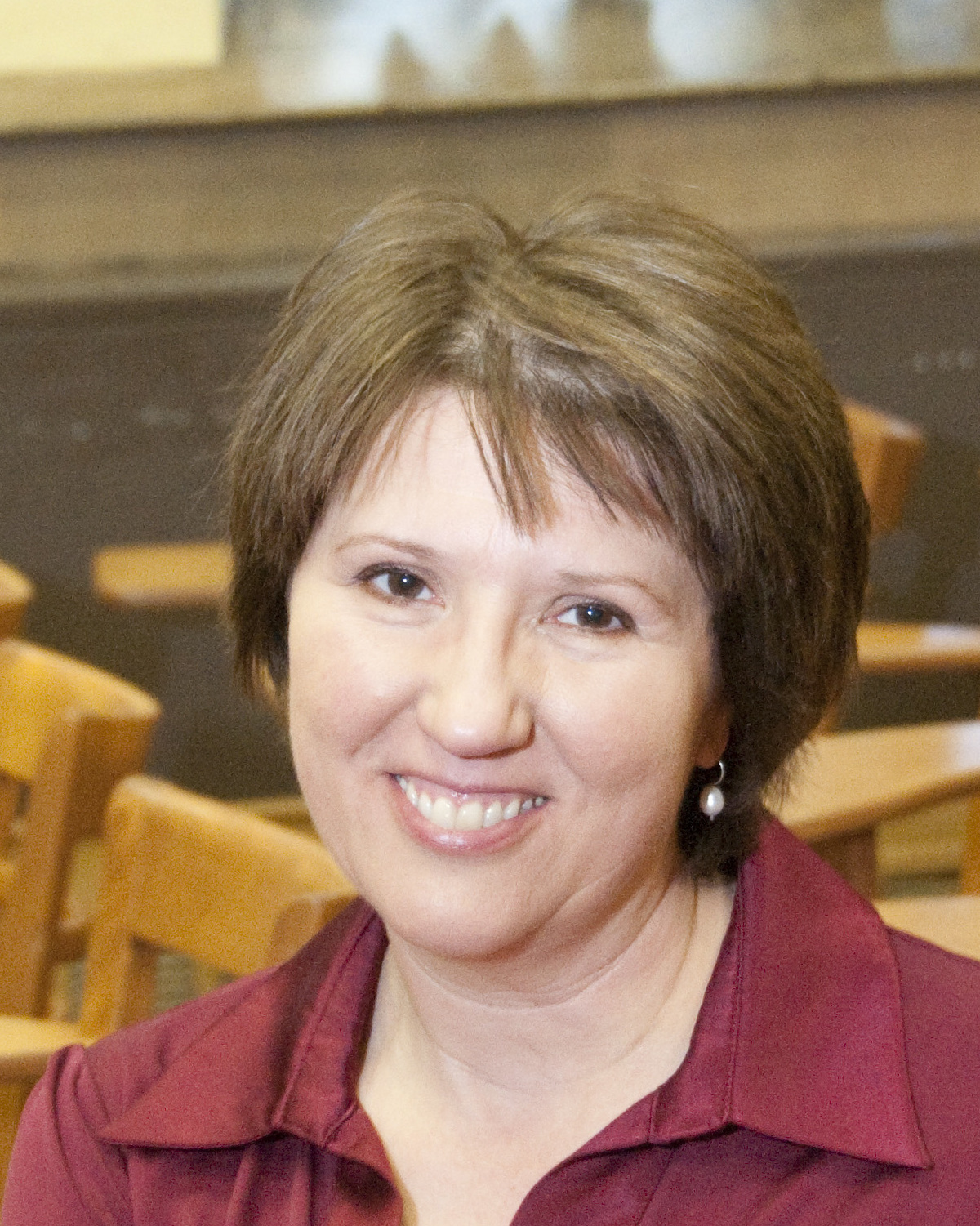
Portrait of Johanna Schneller at a 2011 WSFF Master Class

Johanna Schneller is an American-born Canadian film journalist and television personality, who hosted the film talk show The Filmmakers on CBC Television.

A freelance celebrity interviewer for such publications as Vanity Fair, GQ, Chatelaine and Toronto Life, she is also the film columnist for The Globe and Mail, and hosted TVOntario's weekly Saturday Night at the Movies for two seasons. She has also been a regular television columnist for the Toronto Star and the StarMetro chain. Schneller has lived in Toronto since 1994 with her husband, Canadian journalist Ian Brown, and their two children, Hayley and Walker.

Schneller was appointed president of the Toronto Film Critics Association in 2021. Schneller resigned from this position in March 2026, after her decision to remove two sentences expressing support for Palestine from a pre-recorded acceptance speech by actress and filmmaker Elle-Máijá Tailfeathers at the Toronto Film Critics Association Awards 2025 award ceremony. Tailfeathers, who was awarded outstanding supporting performance in a Canadian film for her role in Sweet Angel Baby, returned her award after her speech was cut short, and nearly half of the Toronto Film Critics Association's members resigned.
