= Rinaldo Walcott =

Canadian academic and writer (born 1965)

- Born: 1965 (age 60–61)

Academic background
- Education: York University (BA); University of Toronto (MA, PhD)
- Thesis: Performing the Postmodern: Black Atlantic Rap and Identity in North America (1995)

Academic work
- Discipline: Cultural studies
- Sub-discipline: Black studies; Diaspora studies; Gender studies; Queer studies
- Institutions: University of Buffalo; University of Toronto; York University
- Website: arts-sciences.buffalo.edu/africana-and-american-studies/faculty/faculty-directory/walcott-rinaldo.html

Rinaldo Wayne Walcott (born 1965) is a Canadian academic and writer.

== Work ==
Walcott published Black Like Who? in 1997, coming out of research related to his PhD studies which focused on, in Walcott's own words, "questions of popular culture and exploring how rap music in the early 1990s was emerging as an important social and political force across North America". The collection of essays in Black Like Who? expand this inquiry into areas such as poetry, literature, diasporic studies, film criticism and other discussions central to issues surrounding Black space, place, and landscape in Canada.

Walcott is Professor and Chair of Africana and American Studies at the State University of New York (SUNY) at Buffalo. He holds the Carl V. Granger Chair in Africana and American Studies. Previously, he was an associate professor at the Ontario Institute for Studies in Education and the director of the Women and Gender Studies Institute at the University of Toronto. He was also affiliated with the Cinema Studies Institute at the University of Toronto. Walcott was formerly an assistant professor at York University. From 2002 to 2007, he was the Canada Research Chair of Social Justice and Cultural Studies.

Walcott's work focuses on Black studies, Canadian studies, cultural studies, queer theory, gender studies, and diaspora studies.

He was prominently profiled as a key builder of LGBTQ Black Canadian culture in the 2019 documentary film Our Dance of Revolution.

== Life ==
He wrote in 2021 "I was born in the Caribbean Barbados and have lived most of my life in Canada, specifically Toronto."

He is out as queer.

== Selected publications ==
- 1997, Black Like Who?: Writing Black Canada (Toronto: Insomniac Press).
- 2000, Rude: Contemporary Black Canadian Cultural Criticism [editor] (Toronto: Insomniac Press).
- 2003, Black Like Who?: Writing Black Canada (Toronto: Insomniac Press). [Second Revised Edition]
- 2016, Queer Returns: Essays On Multiculturalism, Diaspora and Black Studies (Toronto: Insomniac Press).
- 2019, BlackLife: Post-BLM and the Struggle for Freedom with Idil Abdillahi (Winnipeg: ARP Books).
- 2021, On Property (Windsor, Ontario: Biblioasis).
- 2021, The Long Emancipation: Moving toward Black Freedom (Durham, NC: Duke University Press)
