= Samra Habib =

Canadian photographer, writer, and activist

- Born: 15 September 1981 [Pakistan]
- Occupations: writer, photographer, activist

Samra Habib is a Pakistani Canadian photographer, writer and activist. They are most noted for Just Me and Allah, a photography project they launched in 2014 to document the lives of LGBTQ Muslims, and We Have Always Been Here, a memoir of their experience as a queer-identified Muslim published in 2019 by Penguin Random House Canada.

Born in Pakistan to Ahmadi Muslim parents, Habib emigrated to Canada with their family in 1991 to escape religious persecution. They grew up primarily in Toronto and were forced into an arranged marriage as a teenager before coming out as queer. Habib has also published articles bringing awareness to international social issues like women's rights, the experiences of queer Muslims, and childcare.

== Just Me and Allah: A Queer Muslim Photo Project (2014) ==
Habib's photography project, Just Me and Allah, is focused on queer and Muslim iconography in order to spread the hidden culture of queer Muslims. Habib themselves explains the motivation for the photography project saying "I wanted to show everyone the creative and brilliant LGBTQ Muslims I identified with the most and would hang out with at art shows, queer dance parties, and Jumu'ah prayers. So I picked up my camera and decided to photograph what I was witnessing.".

== We Have Always Been Here: A Queer Muslim Memoir (2019) ==
We Have Always Been Here was published on June 4, 2019, and was the winner of the 2020 edition of Canada Reads, in which it was defended by actress Amanda Brugel. It was also longlisted for the RBC Taylor Prize, and won a Lambda Literary Award for Lesbian Memoir or Biography at the 32nd Lambda Literary Awards. The memoir has been received as a "...touching story of growing up, finding a home, and discovering oneself against the backdrop of cultural and familial expectations." by the LGBTQ+ newspaper, Seattle Gay News, on April 1, 2022.

Its title was taken from a quote included in their memoir, We Have Always Been Here. Zainab, a transgender Muslim woman said, "We have always been here, it's just that the world wasn't ready for us".
