= Maya Bankovic =

Canadian cinematographer (born 1984)

- Born: December 15, 1984 (age 41)
- Occupation: Cinematographer
- Notable work: Akilla's Escape; Ordinary Angels; Workin' Moms; Blue Heron

Maya Bankovic (born December 15, 1984) is a Canadian cinematographer. She is most noted for her work on the 2024 film Ordinary Angels, the 2020 film Akilla's Escape, and the 2025 film Blue Heron. For Akilla's Escape, she won the Canadian Screen Award for Best Cinematography at the 9th Canadian Screen Awards in 2021.

She has received several prior CSA nominations for her work in television, receiving three nods for Best Photography in a Comedy Program or Series for Workin' Moms and two nods for Best Photography in a Documentary Program or Series for her work on In the Making. She won the award in the latter category at the 8th Canadian Screen Awards in 2020.

Her other credits have included the films A Touch of Grey, My Prairie Home, Tru Love, Below Her Mouth, The Rainbow Kid, Wexford Plaza, What Is Democracy?, Easy Land, The Prison in Twelve Landscapes, and I Was Lorena Bobbitt, for which she was nominated in the Best Photography, Drama category at the 2021 Canadian Screen Awards and by the Canadian Society of Cinematographers. Her other television work can be seen in the first season of the series Mayor of Kingstown. She is also a regular contributing director of photography on various series in the Star Trek franchise.
