= Rae Spoon =

Canadian singer-songwriter

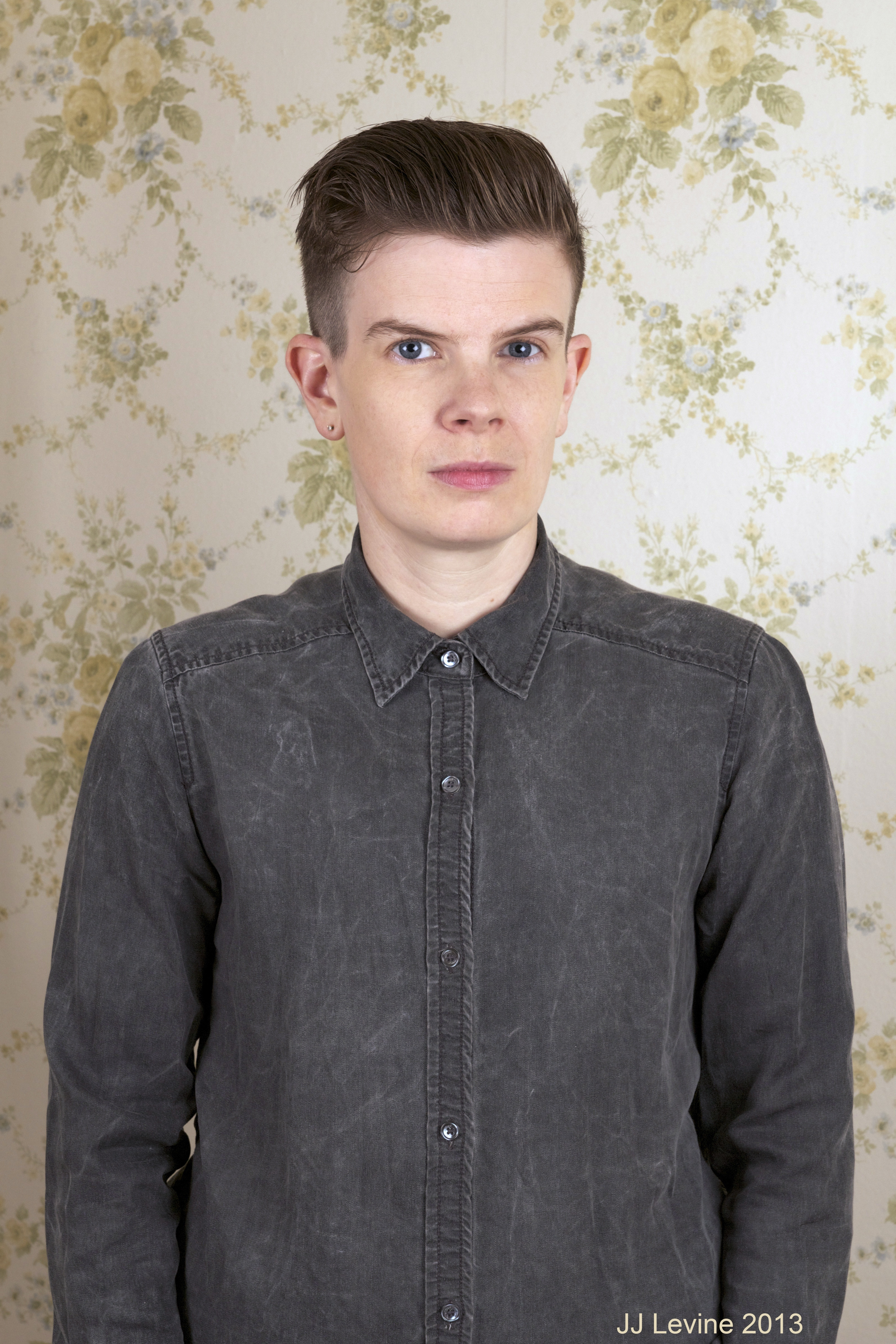
- Rae Spoon in November 2013
- Born: Calgary, Alberta
- Occupations: Singer-songwriter, short story writer
- Writing career
- Period: 1990s–present
- Notable works: First Grass Spring Fire, superioryouareinferior, My Prairie Home
- Website: www.raespoon.ca

Rae Spoon is a Canadian musician, composer, producer, performer, and writer from Calgary, Alberta. Their musical style has varied from country to electronic-influenced indie rock and folk punk.

== Personal life ==
Spoon grew up as a transgender person in Calgary, Alberta. They were raised in a working-class Evangelical Christian Pentecostal household by a paranoid-schizophrenic father. Spoon has lived in Montreal and now lives in Victoria, British Columbia.

In 2003, Spoon said they identified as a trans man. In 2012, during an interview with fellow advocate for the gender-neutral pronoun and cartoonist, Elisha Lim, Spoon noted a preference for the pronoun "they", and has identified as non-binary since then. They explained to Now Magazine, "after years of fighting to be called 'he,' the idea of coming out again made me tired. But now I feel kind of rejuvenated, ready to fight on some more. I think the 'they' pronoun is a pretty cool thing. It's letting a lot of people not have to identify as a man or a woman. Whatever it means to them."

During the 2020 COVID-19 pandemic, which forced them to cancel a series of tours, Spoon was diagnosed with cervical cancer. They said they did not know what the prognosis was at that point. They underwent chemotherapy, radiotherapy, and surgery, and at one point were suffering so much that they considered seeking medical assistance in dying; however, by October 2020, they were declared cancer-free.

== Career ==
=== Early music ===
How do you become a transgender country singer? For some, it's easier to be transgender from the start, and then work towards becoming a singer. For others it is better to play music first, and then come out as transgender. About ten years ago, I managed to do both in the space of a few months.

— Rae Spoon

Spoon started performing before they started recording. They decided they wanted to become a songwriter while performing at the age of seventeen. They emerged as a country and roots singer. Their early music features country imagery to the sound of acoustic string instruments such as banjo, guitar and mandolin. Their early albums include Throw Some Dirt on Me (2003) and White Hearse Comes Rolling (2006).

Spoon has performed with such artists as Annabelle Chvostek, Ember Swift, Kinnie Starr, Melissa Ferrick, The Be Good Tanyas, Bitch & Animal, Natalie Merchant and Earl Scruggs. They have performed at festivals including North Country Fair, South Country Fair, Under the Volcano Festival, and the Vancouver, Regina, Ottawa, Calgary, Edmonton, Brandon Folk, Music & Art Festival and Winnipeg folk festivals.

Spoon's breakthrough album, 2008's Superioryouareinferior, was recorded in Calgary and introduced some electronic music elements into Spoon's style. Superioryouareinferior includes themes previously used by Spoon like Canadian history and culture such as the commentary on colonialism in their song "Come On Forest Fire Burn The Disco Down". Superioryouareinferior was a longlisted nominee for the 2009 Polaris Music Prize.

Spoon has composed music for several films including the National Film Board film Deadman (2009) by Chelsea McMullan. Along with Dan Mangan and others, they contributed to Gavin Gardiner's score for the feature film The Valley Below.

While touring Europe Spoon met Alexandre Decoupigny in Berlin. Decoupigny and Spoon collaborated in the album Worauf Wartest Du? Decoupigny taught Spoon how to create music with a computer which inspired the musician to further experiment with electronic music. The experimentation with electronic music influenced their subsequent albums and culminated in I Can't Keep All Our Secrets.

=== First Spring Grass Fire and My Prairie Home ===
Spoon published First Spring Grass Fire, a book of short stories about growing up in Alberta. Arsenal Pulp Press released the book in the fall of 2012. The book was a nominee for the 2013 Lambda Literary Awards in the Transgender Fiction category, and Spoon was awarded an Honour of Distinction from the Dayne Ogilvie Prize for LGBT writers in 2014.

Spoon has stated that First Spring Grass Fire was written to help them prepare for the production of a National Film Board of Canada documentary about their life and music, My Prairie Home, directed by Chelsea McMullan. The film was released in the fall of 2013. My Prairie Home, the album of music that Spoon composed for the film, was a longlisted nominee for the 2014 Polaris Music Prize.

=== Gender Failure ===
In 2012, Spoon and Ivan Coyote collaborated on Gender Failure, a touring multimedia show in which both artists performed music and spoken word pieces about their failed attempts at fitting into the gender binary. Spoon and Coyote wrote a book based on the show, published by Arsenal Pulp in 2014. Both thought it was important to share their stories in the same book, with Coyote explaining that this can erode the mistaken idea that there is one standard trans experience. Gender Failure was nominated for the ALA's Over the Rainbow Project List in 2015.

=== Recent work ===
Spoon began the music label Coax Records "out of a love for indie music and as an answer to under representation for many groups in the music industry." The album "Armour" was released on Coax in 2016.

In 2017, Spoon published a manual in the How To series, entitled How to (Hide) Be(hind) Your Songs.

bodiesofwater, recorded with respectful child, Laurie-Anne Torres and Terri Upton and released on September 7, 2018, was co-produced with Torres at the Noise Floor Recording Studio on Gabriola Island.

Spoon's young adult novel, Green Glass Ghosts, a queer coming-of-age story set in Vancouver, British Columbia and illustrated by Gem Hall, was published by Arsenal Pulp Press in 2021.

Not Dead Yet (2023) explores Spoon's experience as a nonbinary person undergoing treatment for cervical cancer. They were awarded Best Composer for their score for the documentary film QUINN (2023) by the Toronto Women Film Festival.

Spoon created the music for the children's stage musical The Adventures of Young Turtle, written by S. E. Grummett, together with Ruaridh MacDonald.

In January 2026, Spoon announced a new album, Assigned Country Singer at Birth, set to be released on April 10, 2026, via Coax Records.

== Discography ==
- Honking at Minivans (2001)
- Throw Some Dirt on Me (2003)
- Your Trailer Door (2005)
- White Hearse Comes Rolling (2006)
- Trucker's Memorial (2006, with Rodney Decroo)
- superioryouareinferior (2008)
- Worauf wartest du? (2009, with Alexandre Decoupigny)
- Love Is a Hunter (2010)
- I Can't Keep All of Our Secrets (2012)
- My Prairie Home (2013)
- Armour (2016)
- Jump With Your Eyes Closed (2016)
- They with Plastik (2016)
- My Side of the Mountain with Clyde Petersen (2016)
- bodiesofwater (2018)
- Rae Spoon With Jesus and His Judgemental Father (2019)
- Mental Health (2019)
- Not Dead Yet (2023)
- Assigned Country Singer at Birth (2026)

== Bibliography ==
- First Spring Grass Fire (2012)
- Gender Failure with Ivan Coyote (2014)
- How to (Hide) Be(hind) Your Songs (2017)
- Green Glass Ghosts (2021)
