= Chelsea McMullan =

Canadian documentary filmmaker

- Born: British Columbia, Canada
- Occupations: Documentary filmmaker, writer, and producer
- Known for: My Prairie Home, World Famous Gopher Hole Museum, Ever Deadly

Chelsea McMullan is a Canadian documentary and fiction filmmaker, writer, and producer. Their films have screened at Sundance, TIFF, and the BFI London Film Festival, among other international festivals.

McMullan is best known for their 2013 film My Prairie Home, a film about transgender musician Rae Spoon.

McMullan is non-binary, and uses they/them pronouns.

== Early life ==
McMullan was born in 1984, grew up in Langley, British Columbia, and began creating short movies at the age of seven. McMullan, an avid basketball player, received a basketball scholarship to play at Brookswood Secondary School and was scouted to play at the university level in Canada, but eventually decided to pursue an interest in film.

== Career ==
Chelsea McMullan studied film in the Department of Film (now Cinema and Media Arts) at York University in Toronto; graduating with a BFA (Specialized Honours) in 2006, and receiving their MFA in 2010.

McMullan's early film credits include the documentary films Derailments (Deragliamenti) and The Way Must Be Tried, and the short films Plume and Bath Time.

=== Derailments (Deragliamenti) ===
McMullan created the short film Derailments (Deragliamenti) during their residency at Fabrica, which took place in Italy at the Benetton artistic institute. The film depicts the cartoonist Milo Manara's experience re-imagining the lost Federico Fellini film Il Viaggio di Mastorna detto Fernet through his drawings. McMullan through their Fabrica connections was able to sit down with the 66-year-old Milo Manara for an interview. With the help from a translator McMullan was able to create the 11-minute short film, which was then featured in Vogue Italia. The film was nominated for the 2012 Genie Award for best short documentary.

=== My Prairie Home ===
The documentary-musical follows the transgender musician Rae Spoon, whom McMullans first met when they wanted to secure rights to one of Spoon's songs as background music for Deadman. The film was produced by the NFB, along with the Governor General's Performing Arts Awards Foundation.

The film competed as the only Canadian feature in the World Cinema Documentary program at the 2014 Sundance Film Festival It won the grand jury award for best documentary at the Milan International Lesbian and Gay Film Festival, earned a special mention at the Krakow Film Festival and was nominated for the Canadian Screen Award for Best Feature Length Documentary at the 2nd Canadian Screen Awards.

McMullan has worked on several projects with the National Film Board of Canada. In addition to My Prairie Home, their prior films Mise en Scène and Deadman were also made in collaboration with the NFB.

=== Michael Shannon Michael Shannon John & World Famous Gopher Hole Museum ===
In 2015 McMullan released the documentary Mystery film, Michael Shannon Michael Shannon John

McMullan's 2015 film World Famous Gopher Hole Museum was nominated for the Canadian Screen Award for Best Short Documentary at the 4th Canadian Screen Awards.

=== Ever Deadly ===
In 2022, McMullan and Inuk throat singer-songwriter-avant-garde performer Tanya Tagaq collaborated on the film Ever Deadly. Filmed in Nunavut the film showcases Tanya Tagaq life, both her on-stage performances and her personal life with Tagaq highlighting Inuit and Canadian history. Tagaq highlights the human rights crisis of the missing and murdered indigenous women, discussing the death of an Inuk girl named Loretta Saunders.

=== Crystal Pite: Angels' Atlas ===
The film Crystal Pite: Angels' Atlas profiling a dance work by ballet choreographer Crystal Pite, was also released in 2022. The film won the VIFF audience showcase award that year.

=== Swan Song ===
In 2023, McMullan released Swan Song, a documentary film profiling Karen Kain as she prepares to retire from her career in dance. That same year Swan Song, won the Rogers Best Canadian Film Award for Best Canadian Documentary. Along with the award McMullan received a cash prize of $50,000. The awards were held at The OMNI King Edward Hotel in Toronto. McMullan attended the gala with the film's producer Sean O'Neill.

Their latest work is a short film titled Healer which premiered at the 2025 Toronto International Film Festival.

McMullan's forthcoming project is a narrative feature film, Swan Killer.

== Filmography ==
Films
Year	Title
2004	Bath Time
2006	Plume
2009	Deadman
2011	The Way Must Be Tried
2011	Derailments
2012	Mise En scène
2013	My Prairie Home
2015	World Famous Gopher Hole Museum
2015	Notes On The Gaze
2015	Michael Shannon Michael Shannon John
2015	Getting There: Isabel Marant
2016	What Is #Perfection?
2022	Ever Deadly
2022	Crystal Pite:Angels' Atlas
2023	Swan Song
2025	Healer

TV series
Year	Title	Episode(s)
2019	B.A. Johnston's Ham Jam	"Subs Part 1" "Subs Part 2" "Steel" "Arcades" "Waterfalls" "Slater"
2018-2019	In the Making	"Crystal Pite" "Shelley Niro" "Curtis Talwst Santiago"
2021	This Is Pop	"The Boyz II Men Effect" "The Brill Building in 4 songs"
2023	Swan Song	"Queen Behaviour" "Captured Women" "Razor's Edge" "Opening Night"
