= Danis Goulet =

Canadian First Nations filmmaker (born 1977)

- Born: 1977 (age 48–49); La Ronge, Saskatchewan, Canada
- Occupations: Director and screenwriter
- Notable work: Night Raiders
- Father: Keith Goulet

Danis Goulet (born 1977) is a Canadian First Nations (Cree-Métis) filmmaker and screenwriter, whose debut feature film, Night Raiders, premiered in 2021.

== Early life ==
Goulet is originally from La Ronge, Saskatchewan. Her non-Indigenous mother worked in the education department of First Nations University. Her Nehinuw (Cree) father, Keith, was a Member of the Legislative Assembly (MLA), and is a fluent Nehinuwehin (Cree) speaker who grew up living a trapping, hunting, fishing and gathering lifestyle in the Cree community of Cumberland House.

After graduating high school, Goulet backpacked abroad. She returned to Regina in 1998.

== Career ==
Goulet's first experience in the film industry was in 1998. She was assistant to the casting director for a CBC miniseries about the life of Chief Big Bear that was filming in Regina, a job she got when her mother was asked for help finding extras for the film. She worked in the film industry in Saskatchewan and Alberta for the next two years.

Goulet moved to Toronto in the early 2000s to study at the Canadian Film Centre. After being asked to cast a "Pocahontas type" for an American television pilot, convincing her that Indigenous people needed more creative control over their own stories, Goulet began to realize the importance of Indigenous people taking key creative roles in film and changing narratives about Indigenous people. She attended a filmmaking workshop in New York, which led to her creating her first short film. She has since directed a number of films, including Spin (2004), Divided by Zero (2006), Wapawekka (2010), Barefoot (2012), Wakening (2013), and Night Raiders (2021).

In 2013, Goulet co-authored a report for Telefilm Canada about the lack of Indigenous feature film production in the country. She served for a number of years as artistic director of the imagineNATIVE Film and Media Arts Festival. She was also a consulting producer on the 2020 television series Trickster, but resigned from the show after the emergence of allegations that series creator Michelle Latimer had misrepresented her Indigenous identity.

Goulet began writing Night Raiders in 2013 after her science-fiction short Wakening inspired her to experiment more with the genre. She shot the film in 2019 in Ontario. Post-production was completed in New Zealand. Night Raiders had the largest production budget of any Indigenous-led Canadian film. The record was previously held by Jeff Barnaby's Blood Quantum. Goulet stated that the film was inspired in large part by Indigenous resistance movements.

Night Raiders, directed by Goulet, was produced by New Zealand film director Taika Waititi. It premiered at the 71st Berlin International Film Festival in March 2021, though Goulet was unable to attend the premiere. Night Raiders was one of the first 13 films announced for the 2021 Toronto International Film Festival. She was also announced as the 2021 recipient of TIFF's Emerging Talent Award. The film was nominated for 11 awards at the 2022 Canadian Screen Awards, tied with Scarborough for the most nominations for one film that year. Goulet was a Canadian Screen Award nominee for Best Director and Best Original Screenplay at the 10th Canadian Screen Awards in 2022, winning Best Original Screenplay. The film was also a nominee for both Best Picture and the John Dunning Best First Feature Award.

In its year-end review of Canadian film and television in 2021, the trade magazine Playback named Goulet the Director of the Year. Goulet directed the fourth episode of the second season of Reservation Dogs.

In the same year Goulet was announced as the director of Ivy, an upcoming Netflix thriller film slated to star Brazilian actress Alice Braga.

She directed episodes seven and eight of the first season of North of North.

== Personal life ==
Goulet is married to Tony Elliott. She has a son and a daughter.

== Awards ==
Year	Award	Category	Work	Result	Notes	Ref(s)
2021	DGC Discovery Awards	n/a	Night Raiders	Won		
2021	Vancouver Film Critics Circle	Best Director of a Canadian Film	Night Raiders	Won		
2021	Vancouver Film Critics Circle	Best Screenplay for a Canadian Film	Night Raiders	Nominated		
2021	Toronto International Film Festival	TIFF Emerging Talent Award	Night Raiders	Won		
2021	Toronto Film Critics Association Awards	Rogers Best Canadian Film Award	Night Raiders	Nominated		
2022	Canadian Screen Awards	Best Picture	Night Raiders	Nominated	for Tara Woodbury, Paul Barkin, Ainsley Gardiner, Georgina Conder, Danis Goulet	
2022	Canadian Screen Awards	Best Director	Night Raiders	Nominated		
2022	Canadian Screen Awards	Best Original Screenplay	Night Raiders	Won		
2022	Canadian Screen Awards	John Dunning Best First Feature Award	Night Raiders	Nominated		
