= Vancouver Film Critics Circle Awards 2021 =

Annual Canadian film awards ceremony

The 22nd Vancouver Film Critics Circle Awards were presented on March 7, 2022, to honour the films selected by the Vancouver Film Critics Circle as the best of 2021. Although usually presented in December of the same year for which the awards are presented, these awards were delayed to the winter of 2022, due to the COVID-19 pandemic in Canada and the associated complications in film production and distribution.

Nominations were announced on February 20.

== Winners and nominees ==
=== International ===
Category	Winners and nominees	Films	Ref.
Best Film	Jane Campion	The Power of the Dog	
Best Film	Kenneth Branagh	Belfast	
Best Film	Sian Heder	CODA	
Best Actor	Andrew Garfield	Tick, Tick... Boom!	
Best Actor	Bradley Cooper	Nightmare Alley	
Best Actor	Denzel Washington	The Tragedy of Macbeth	
Best Actress	Olivia Colman	The Lost Daughter	
Best Actress	Jessica Chastain	The Eyes of Tammy Faye	
Best Actress	Renate Reinsve	The Worst Person in the World	
Best Supporting Actor	Troy Kotsur	CODA	
Best Supporting Actor	Bradley Cooper	Licorice Pizza	
Best Supporting Actor	Jesse Plemons	The Power of the Dog	
Best Supporting Actor	Kodi Smit-McPhee	The Power of the Dog	
Best Supporting Actress	Ann Dowd	Mass	
Best Supporting Actress	Jessie Buckley	The Lost Daughter	
Best Supporting Actress	Kirsten Dunst	The Power of the Dog	
Best Director	Denis Villeneuve	Dune	
Best Director	Kenneth Branagh	Belfast	
Best Director	Jane Campion	The Power of the Dog	
Best Screenplay	Adam McKay, David Sirota	Don't Look Up	
Best Screenplay	Kenneth Branagh	Belfast	
Best Screenplay	Maggie Gyllenhaal	The Lost Daughter	
Best Documentary	Jonas Poher Rasmussen	Flee	
Best Documentary	Edgar Wright	The Sparks Brothers	
Best Documentary	Questlove	Summer of Soul	
Best Foreign Language Film	Joachim Trier	The Worst Person in the World	
Best Foreign Language Film	Jonas Poher Rasmussen	Flee	
Best Foreign Language Film	Anders Thomas Jensen	Riders of Justice	

=== Canadian ===
Category	Winners and nominees	Films	Ref.
Best Film	Michael McGowan	All My Puny Sorrows	
Best Film	Danis Goulet	Night Raiders	
Best Film	Shasha Nakhai, Rich Williamson	Scarborough	
Best Actor	Daniel Doheny	Drinkwater	
Best Actor	Pavle Čemerikić	The White Fortress (Tabija)	
Best Actor	Jorge Antonio Guerrero	Drunken Birds (Les Oiseaux ivres)	
Best Actress	Alison Pill	All My Puny Sorrows	
Best Actress	Piercey Dalton	Be Still	
Best Actress	Elle-Máijá Tailfeathers	Night Raiders	
Best Supporting Actor	Joshua Odjick	Wildhood	
Best Supporting Actor	Eric McCormack	Drinkwater	
Best Supporting Actor	Alex Tarrant	Night Raiders	
Best Supporting Actress	Sarah Gadon	All My Puny Sorrows	
Best Supporting Actress	Cherish Violet Blood	Scarborough	
Best Supporting Actress	Brooklyn Hart	Night Raiders	
Best Supporting Actress	Amanda Plummer	Night Raiders	
Best Supporting Actress	Ellie Posadas	Scarborough	
Best Director	Danis Goulet	Night Raiders	
Best Director	Michael McGowan	All My Puny Sorrows	
Best Director	Shasha Nakhai, Rich Williamson	Scarborough	
Best Screenplay	Michael McGowan	All My Puny Sorrows	
Best Screenplay	Igor Drljaca	The White Fortress (Tabija)	
Best Screenplay	Danis Goulet	Night Raiders	
Best Screenplay	Catherine Hernandez	Scarborough	
Best Documentary	Elle-Máijá Tailfeathers	Kímmapiiyipitssini: The Meaning of Empathy	
Best Documentary	Tyson Sadler	The Last Tourist	
Best Documentary	Arthur Jones	The Six	
Best British Columbia Film	Trevor Mack	Portraits from a Fire	
Best British Columbia Film	Elizabeth Lazebnik	Be Still	
Best British Columbia Film	Steve J. Adams, Sean Horlor	Someone Like Me	
One to Watch	Trevor Mack	Portraits from a Fire	
One to Watch	Pavle Čemerikić	The White Fortress (Tabija)	
One to Watch	Elizabeth Lazebnik	Be Still	
