= Scarborough (novel) =

2017 Canadian novel

First edition (publ. Arsenal Pulp Press)

Scarborough is the debut novel by Canadian writer Catherine Hernandez, published in 2017. Set in the Toronto district of Scarborough, the novel centres on the coming-of-age of three young children living in the low-income Galloway Road neighbourhood — Bing, a boy struggling with his sexual identity; Laura, a girl who longs for stability as she is continually being shuffled back and forth between her mother's and her father's separate homes; and Sylvie, a girl whose family is living in a homeless shelter — as well as Hina, a community literacy worker dedicated to serving as a supportive oasis of guidance for underprivileged children in her community.

== Awards ==
The novel was a shortlisted finalist for the 2017 Toronto Book Awards, the 2018 Trillium Book Award for English Prose, and the 2018 Edmund White Award.

The novel was subsequently selected for the 2022 edition of Canada Reads, where it was defended by Malia Baker.

== Film adaptation ==
The novel was adapted by Shasha Nakhai and Rich Williamson into the theatrical film Scarborough, which premiered at the 2021 Toronto International Film Festival.

Hernandez wrote the screenplay, and won the Canadian Screen Award for Best Adapted Screenplay at the 10th Canadian Screen Awards in 2022. The film also won the award for Best Picture, Nakhai and Williamson won Best Director, and Liam Diaz won Best Actor for his portrayal of Bing.
