= Thomas Congdon =

American book publisher

Thomas Boss Congdon Jr.
- Born: March 17, 1931
- Died: December 23, 2008 (aged 77)
- Occupations: Editor and publisher
- Years active: 1956-1994

Thomas Boss Congdon Jr. (March 17, 1931 – December 23, 2008) was an American book editor. He worked on Russell Baker's memoir Growing Up, Peter Benchley's bestselling novel Jaws, and David Halberstam's 1986 work The Reckoning, as well as the infamous Michelle Remembers, an unreliable account of child abuse that contributed to the Satanic panic. He ultimately establishing his own publishing house.

== Early life, family and education ==
Congdon was born on March 17, 1931, in New London, Connecticut. He had a brother and sister.

He attended Yale College but dropped out during his sophomore year to work on a gold mine in Fairbanks, Alaska. He did return to Yale, however, graduating in 1953. Having completed the Naval Reserve Officers Training Corps at Yale, upon graduation he was commissioned an ensign in the United States Navy Reserves. While in the Navy, he served on the battleships USS Iowa (BB-61) and USS Wisconsin (BB-64). He subsequently attended Columbia University, where he studied journalism.

== Career ==
Congdon became an editor at The Saturday Evening Post and worked there for 12 years. In 1968, he took his first position in book publishing at Harper & Row, and was hired by Doubleday in 1971.

At Doubleday, Congdon had read a number of articles written by Peter Benchley and invited Benchley to lunch to discuss some ideas for books. Benchley wanted to write a non-fiction book about pirates, but Congdon wasn't interested. Congdon asked if he had any ideas for fiction, and Benchley respond with his idea of a novel about a great white shark terrorizing a beach resort. Congdon offered Benchley an advance of $1,000, leading to the novelist submitting the first 100 pages. After extensive rewriting based on Congdon's guidance, Jaws was published in 1974 and stayed on the bestseller list for some 44 weeks.

In April 1974, Congdon was named as editor-in-chief of adult trade books at E. P. Dutton.

He worked with author A. Scott Berg, who was writing a book about Maxwell Perkins. Congdon reviewed Berg's original manuscripts, which had been written in the varying styles of several notable authors, and finally circled a paragraph that he felt captured what he was looking for, saying "You know who this sounds like? Nobody. Write the whole book like this. That's your voice." The published book, Maxwell Perkins: Editor of Genius, won the 1980 National Book Award.

Russell Baker, who had been a columnist for The New York Times worked with Congdon on his best-selling memoir Growing Up, which Baker said would never have been written without Congdon's assistance. Baker said that "After a lot of wine, I’d start talking about my uncles; I had a lot of uncles. And Tom said, 'This really ought to be a book.'" Baker wrote a draft, which Congdon rejected as "a piece of reporting", insisting that Baker rewrite the stories and the characters as they were when they were young. Baker recounted that "I threw the whole thing away and started over. A lot of the success of that book is due to him."

In 1979, Congdon left E. P. Dutton to partner up with French publisher Jean-Claude Lattès. During that period, he published Michelle Remembers. Written by psychiatrist Lawrence Pazder, the book is widely considered as an unreliable story of ritual abuse story that contributed to the satanic panic of the 1980s. Congdon & Lattès (later known as Congdon & Weed) went bankrupt in 1985. Congdon edited books for other publishers, editing David Halberstam's The Reckoning published in 1986 by William Morrow and Company.

In 1994, Congdon's non-fiction book Having Babies was published by Simon & Schuster, described by Kirkus Reviews as "A look at pregnancy and childbirth as they are experienced by patients of an obstetrical practice in a wealthy New Jersey town."

== Personal life and demise ==
Congdon was married for fifty years. He and his wife Constance had two daughters and three granddaughters.

He died at age 77 on December 23, 2008, at his home in Nantucket, Massachusetts, due to congestive heart failure and Parkinson's disease.
