= Sean Horlor =

Canadian film director and poet (born 1981)

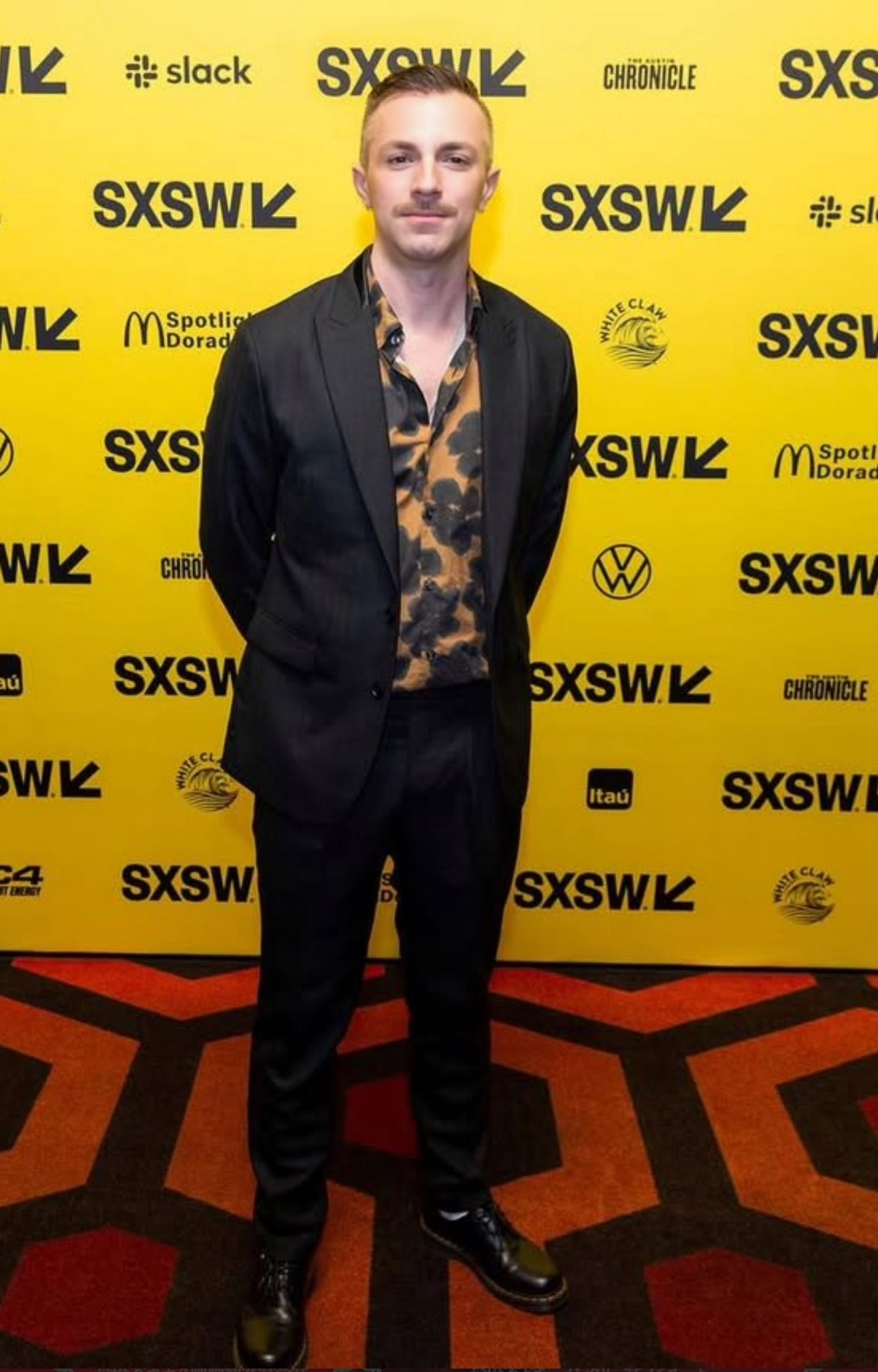
- Horlor at the SXSW Film Festival, Austin, Texas, in 2023
- Born: January 11, 1981 (age 45); Edmonton, Alberta, Canada
- Education: University of Victoria
- Occupations: Filmmaker; Author
- Years active: 2007–present
- Website: seanhorlor.com

Sean Horlor (born January 11, 1981) is a Canadian film director, film producer, poet, actor, television host, and author. His notable works include the documentaries Satan Wants You and Someone Like Me, the reality TV series Don't Quit Your Gay Job, and the book Made Beautiful by Use. Across mediums, Horlor's work explores "the constellation of factors behind excessive, unfounded cultural anxieties" and "the real damage people can do when stories get out of control."

== Early life and education ==
Born in Edmonton, Alberta, Horlor grew up in Victoria, British Columbia.

As a child in Victoria during the 1980s, Horlor experienced the wave of public hysteria sparked by Michelle Remembers (1980), a bestselling memoir that claimed to expose a satanic cult operating in the city. The book and its authors, psychiatrist Lawrence Pazder and his patient Michelle Smith, lived a short distance from Horlor's family, and their story dominated local media and conversation. Rumours of satanic activity were so widespread that police officers guarded hospital maternity wards and children were photographed for safety programs. Horlor later recalled the atmosphere of fear that pervaded his childhood, describing it as "a time where every shadow seemed to hold a lurking danger."

Decades later, these memories would resurface as the inspiration for his feature documentary Satan Wants You (2023), which investigates the real-world origins and global spread of the Satanic Panic.

Horlor has an undergraduate degree in fine arts from the University of Victoria. His focus was in creative writing, where he studied with authors Lorna Crozier, Patrick Lane, Bill Gaston, and Aislinn Hunter. Horlor has often credited poet Patrick Lane as a formative influence on his artistic development.

In a 2024 interview with the Directors Guild of Canada for Pride Month, he reflected on early advice he received about visibility and identity as an artist:

"I remember being told in university by a mentor figure that I could either be a gay artist or an artist who happens to be gay—and that I would have to choose because it would be the lens through which my work and career would forever be viewed. To be honest, it made my blood boil at the time. But in a way it was also good advice because what I chose then was to be visible: first as a queer author, then as a reality TV host, and now as a film and commercial director."

== Career ==
=== Writing ===
Sean Horlor began his career as a poet, publishing widely in Canadian literary journals while still a teenager. His early chapbook Our Mission, Our Moment (2003) was published by Vancouver poet Matt Rader through Rader's Mosquito Press imprint, with cover art by illustrator James Kingsley. The collection reimagined speeches by George W. Bush as poetic transpositions of the original texts. After a residency at the Banff Centre's Writing Studio in 2004, Horlor's poem "In Praise of Beauty" won This Magazine's 2006 Great Canadian Literary Hunt, and "St. Brendan and the Isle of Sheep" was named an Editor's Choice in Arc Poetry Magazine's Poem of the Year contest.

==== Made Beautiful by Use ====
Horlor's debut poetry collection, Made Beautiful by Use, was published by Signature Editions in 2007 and edited by poet John Barton. The book was longlisted for the 2008 ReLit Awards and praised by critics as "a striking and, yes, beautiful set of musings on belief, sex, and power." Monday Magazine called Horlor "devastatingly smart and sharp," writing that the book "mixes politics with poetics" and "strikes literary oil." The review described the collection as "a snapshot of misplaced faith and the evangelical need to believe," noting Horlor's fascination with saints, hagiographies, and "the story of St. Brendan, virtues, and George W. Bush, the saint."

Written in part at a former nunnery, Made Beautiful by Use juxtaposes the sacred and the secular, reframing political speech as devotional text. Horlor described his "transpositions" of George W. Bush's speeches as a way to expose the mythic language of power and belief. Geist magazine highlighted his formal precision and sonic quality, observing that "such lines, coupled with small, powerful statements—'desire is lonely work'—and a strict sense of rhythm, give Horlor's work momentum." The reviewer added that "even when the subject matter turns dark, Horlor makes the darkness delicate, showing a sadness that is almost peaceful."

The collection's exploration of faith, language, and the construction of truth foreshadowed themes that would later appear in Horlor's documentary work, including the role of belief and storytelling in shaping collective fear and moral certainty.

==== Other writing ====
Horlor's work also appeared in Seminal: The Anthology of Canada's Gay Male Poets (Arsenal Pulp Press, 2007), a landmark collection edited by Billeh Nickerson and John Barton.

Following the release of Made Beautiful by Use, a front-page feature in Xtra!—Canada's national LGBTQ+ newspaper—led to a regular column by Horlor where he wrote about sexuality, celebrity, art, and popular culture. He interviewed artists including Robyn, Margaret Cho, and Boy George. In 2008, Xtra! and Horlor launched Vancouver's first gay blog, Up Your Alley.

Beyond poetry and LGBTQ+ writing, Horlor has contributed essays and opinion pieces to The Globe and Mail, The Vancouver Sun, and the Canadian Broadcasting Corporation. His later non-fiction, including the Substack series Ghost From The Past, continues his exploration of memory, identity, and personal narrative.

=== Television and early film work ===
==== Don't Quit Your Gay Job ====
In 2009, Horlor co-created and co-hosted Don't Quit Your Gay Job, an original Canadian reality-comedy series for OUTtv. Conceived in the wake of the 2008 financial crisis, the show playfully explored cultural anxieties around work, identity, and masculinity by following Horlor and friend Rob Easton as they competed to master a new profession each week—from stripper to bus driver to police officer.

Writing for The Georgia Straight, critic Craig Takeuchi described the series as "a Vancouver-based reality competition that turns everyday labour into comic theatre," noting that Horlor and Easton's friendly rivalry often gave way to "moments of genuine panic, humility, and self-discovery." [ref Takeuchi] Horlor told the paper the show resonated with viewers because "people were losing jobs everywhere and asking, 'How hard is it to do something new?'"

Gay Calgary & Edmonton Magazine compared the series to a "Canadian version of The Simple Life with politer, better-looking hosts," praising its mix of humour and sincerity and its significance as one of the first reality shows fronted by two openly gay men on Canadian television. The publication noted that while Season 1 focused on queer-coded occupations such as drag performance and modelling, Season 2 broadened its scope to mainstream jobs—including work with the Vancouver Police Department—and was subsequently broadcast not only on OUTtv but internationally through Europe's OUTtv network and the U.S. here! Network.

In a 2009 interview with OUTtv, Horlor recalled that the show's concept grew out of his freelance writing for Xtra! and his blog Up Your Alley, Vancouver's first gay blog. He described the opportunity to co-create the show as "selfish in the best way"—a chance to try the jobs he'd always daydreamed about—and emphasized the show's intention to portray "positive, visible, funny gay role models" for audiences who had rarely seen themselves on television.

Don't Quit Your Gay Job ran for two seasons and became one of OUTtv's most-watched early programs, earning multiple Leo Award nominations and developing a cult following for its combination of humour, competition, and commentary on contemporary queer identity.

==== Early film work ====
In 2011, became the co-founder and co-owner with Steve J. Adams of Nootka St. Film Company. Adams and Horlor directed a number of short films together, including Just the Tip (2012), Only One (2016), A Small Part of Me (2016), Angela (2016), Hunting Giants (2017), Brunch Queen (2018), The Day Don Died (2018) and Dear Reader (2021).

=== Feature documentaries ===
Horlor and Adams premiered their debut feature documentary Someone Like Me at the 2021 Hot Docs Canadian International Documentary Festival, where it won a Rogers Audience Award and finished as a Top 5 Audience Favourite for the festival. Produced by the National Film Board of Canada, the film follows eleven strangers from Vancouver's LGBTQ community over fifteen months after they unite to help a queer youth escape life-threatening violence in Uganda.

It was later a finalist for Best British Columbia Film at the Vancouver Film Critics Circle Awards 2021, and a nominee for the DGC Allan King Award for Best Documentary Film at the 2021 Directors Guild of Canada awards.

Horlor and Adams' 2023 documentary Satan Wants You looks into the Canadian origins of North America's moral Satanic panic over alleged satanic cults and ritual abuse in the 1980s and early 1990s, particularly the discredited 1980 bestseller Michelle Remembers.

== Bibliography ==
- Our Mission, Our Moment (Mosquito Press, 2003)
- Made Beautiful by Use (Signature Editions, 2007)

== Filmography ==
=== Feature films ===
| Year | Title | Director | Producer | Writer |
|---|---|---|---|---|
| 2021 | Someone Like Me | Yes | No | Yes |
| 2023 | Satan Wants You | Yes | Yes | Yes |

=== Short films ===
| Year | Title | Director | Producer | Writer |
|---|---|---|---|---|
| 2012 | Just The Tip | Yes | Yes | Yes |
| 2016 | The Only One | Yes | Yes | Yes |
| 2016 | A Small Part Of Me | Yes | Yes | Yes |
| 2016 | Angela | Yes | Yes | Yes |
| 2017 | Hunting Giants | Yes | Yes | Yes |
| 2018 | Brunch Queen | Yes | Yes | Yes |
| 2018 | The Day Don Died | Yes | Yes | Yes |

=== Television ===
| Year | Title | Director | Producer | Writer | Host |
|---|---|---|---|---|---|
| 2009 | Don't Quit Your Gay Job | No | Yes | No | Yes |
| 2012 | Hot Pink Shorts: The Making Of | No | No | No | Yes |
| 2021 | Dear Reader | Yes | Yes | Yes | No |
