= Catherine Hernandez =

Canadian writer

Catherine Hernandez is a Canadian writer whose debut novel Scarborough was a shortlisted finalist for the 2017 Toronto Book Awards and the 2018 Edmund White Award.

She has also written the plays The Femme Playlist, Singkil, Eating with Lola, Kilt Pins and Future Folk, and the children's book M for Mustache: A Pride ABC. She was the artistic director of the Sulong and b_current theatre companies in Toronto.

Hernandez is queer and of mixed Filipino, Chinese, Spanish, and Indian descent.

Her second novel, Crosshairs, was published in 2020.

Scarborough was adapted by Shasha Nakhai and Rich Williamson into the film Scarborough, which premiered at the 2021 Toronto International Film Festival. Hernandez won Best Adapted Screenplay at the 10th Canadian Screen Awards. The novel was subsequently selected for the 2022 edition of Canada Reads, where it was defended by Malia Baker.

Hernandez's 2024 novel Behind You made the longlist for the International Dublin Literary Award in 2025.
