= Frame 394 =

- Directed by: Rich Williamson
- Produced by: Shasha Nakhai; Ed Barreveld
- Starring: Daniel Voshart
- Cinematography: Rich Williamson
- Edited by: Rich Williamson
- Music by: Rob Teehan
- Production company: Compy Films
- Distributed by: Canadian Broadcasting Corporation
- Release date: May 3, 2016 (Hot Docs)
- Running time: 30 minutes
- Country: Canada
- Language: English

Frame 394 is a Canadian documentary film, directed by Rich Williamson and released in 2016.

== Summary ==
The film centres on Daniel Voshart, a Canadian cinematographer and image stabilization specialist who reviewed the video of the shooting of Walter Scott, and claimed to have discovered evidence in frame 394 of the video "that challenged the accepted narrative of what transpired between Slager and Scott". The frame appears to show Scott's hands on Slager's taser at the time the officer reached for his gun. If true, this would create justification for use of force. The film discusses the moral conflict caused by the discovery. Voshart's original intent was to find evidence that could be used to convict, not acquit the officer. In the end, he decided he had an obligation to make his findings available to both sides at trial, and was called as a witness for Slager's defense, despite his personal views on Slager's actions.

== Accolades ==
The film premiered at the 2016 Hot Docs Canadian International Documentary Festival.

The film was named to the Toronto International Film Festival's annual year-end Canada's Top Ten list for 2016, and was a Canadian Screen Award nominee for Best Short Documentary Film at the 5th Canadian Screen Awards. It was also named to the initial shortlist for the Academy Award for Best Documentary (Short Subject), but missed out at the 89th Academy Awards.
