= Michelle Remembers =

Discredited book about recovered memory psychotherapy

- First edition
- Authors: Lawrence Pazder; Michelle Smith
- Language: English
- Publisher: St. Martin's Press
- Publication date: November 1, 1980
- Publication place: Canada
- Media type: Print
- ISBN: 978-0-671-69433-3
- LC Class: BF1548 .S65 1980

Michelle Remembers is a 1980 book co-written by Canadian psychiatrist Lawrence Pazder and his psychiatric patient (and eventual wife) Michelle Smith. A best-seller, Michelle Remembers relied on the discredited practice of recovered-memory therapy to make sweeping, lurid claims about Satanic ritual abuse involving Smith, which contributed to the rise of the Satanic panic in the 1980s. While the book presents its claims as fact, and was extensively marketed on that basis at the time, no evidence was provided; all investigations into the book failed to corroborate any of its claims, with investigators describing its content as being primarily based on elements of pop culture and fiction that were popular at the time when it was written.

== Background ==
Pazder was inspired to write the book after seeing the 1976 film adaptation of Sybil about a woman with multiple personality disorder (now called dissociative identity disorder). He pointed out to his then-wife he had a patient "just like" Sybil, and Michelle Remembers chronicles Pazder's therapy during the late 1970s with his long-time patient Smith. In 1973, Pazder first started treating Smith at his private psychiatric practice in Victoria, British Columbia. In 1976, when Pazder was treating Smith for depression (related to her having had a miscarriage) and multiple personality disorder, Smith confided she felt that she had something important to tell him, but could not remember what it was. Soon thereafter, Pazder and Smith had a session where Smith purportedly screamed for 25 minutes non-stop and eventually started speaking in the voice of a five-year-old. According to Pazder, during the next 14 months he spent more than 600 hours using hypnosis to help Smith recover seeming memories of Satanic ritual abuse that occurred when she was five years old in 1954 and 1955 at the hands of her mother and others, all of whom Smith said were members of a "satanic cult" in Victoria.

=== Summary ===
The book chronicles therapy sessions between Pazder and Smith and alleged recovered memories of satanic rituals she claims she was forced to attend. Pazder stated that Smith was abused by the "Church of Satan," purportedly a worldwide organization predating the Christian church. The first alleged ritual attended by Smith occurred in 1954 when she was five years old, with the final one an 81-day ritual in 1955, that supposedly summoned Satan himself and involved the intervention of Jesus, the Virgin Mary, and Michael the Archangel, who removed the scars received by Smith throughout the year of abuse and blocked memories of the events "until the time was right". The book claims that during the rites, Smith was allegedly tortured, locked in cages, sexually assaulted, forced to participate in various rituals, witnessed several human sacrifices, and was rubbed with the blood and body parts of various sacrificed infants and adults.

After Smith had seemingly recovered her memories, she and Pazder consulted with various church authorities, eventually traveling to the Vatican.

== Publication history ==
Michelle Remembers was first publicized with articles in People magazine and the National Enquirer. During 1980, Pazder and Smith toured the United States to promote the book. Ultimately a publishing success, the book earned Pazder and Smith a $100,000 hard-cover advance, $242,000 for paperback rights, royalties, and a potential movie deal.

In 1989, almost 10 years after the publication of Michelle Remembers, Oprah Winfrey featured Smith as a guest on her show alongside Laurel Rose Willson, author of the equally fictitious Satanic ritual abuse survival memoir Satan's Underground, which was published using the pseudonym Lauren Stratford. Both women's experiences were presented by Winfrey as incontrovertible fact, and not once did she question the authenticity of any claim in either book.

== Investigation and debunking ==
Pazder was a credentialed psychiatrist and fellow of the Royal College of Physicians and Surgeons of Canada, and the book states that its source materials (therapy tapes) were scrutinized. However, the accuracy of the allegations in Michelle Remembers was questioned soon after the book was published. After the book's publication, Pazder withdrew his assertion that it was the Church of Satan that had abused Smith when Anton LaVey (who founded the church years after the alleged events of Michelle Remembers) threatened to sue for libel.

In an October 27, 1980 article in the magazine Maclean's, Paul Grescoe interviewed Smith's father, Jack Proby, who denied the allegations against Smith's mother, Virginia (who died in 1964), and claimed he could refute all the allegations in the book. Grescoe also noted that the book failed to make any mention of Smith's two sisters, Charyl (younger) and Tertia (older), or that Pazder and Smith (both Catholics) had divorced their spouses and married each other. The book also fails to mention any police investigations or any attempt Pazder made to involve the police in verifying any of the book's accusations.

However, in a September 30, 1990 article in London England's Sunday Mail, "Michelle Remembers: The Debunking of a Myth / Why the original “ritual abuse” victim may have suffered only from her childhood fantasies," Proby confirmed that a tragic car accident did indeed happen even though it went unreported: "What I do recall was us once coming across a fatal crash in our car. We saw two cars smashed together, and a woman lying in the road bleeding to death. Her intestines were hanging out, and it was a horrible sight. Michelle started to scream, and we could not stop her for ages."

The authors of a 1995 book found no newspaper record of the car crash that the book describes in the time frame described despite the fact that the local newspaper reported on all vehicle accidents at the time. Former neighbors, teachers and friends were interviewed and yearbooks from Smith's elementary school were reviewed and found no indication of Smith being absent from school or missing for lengthy periods of time, including the alleged 81-day non-stop ceremony. Ultimately the book's authors were unable to find anyone who knew Smith during the 1950s who could corroborate any of the details in her allegations.

A 2002 article by Kerr Cuhulain explored what Cuhulain considered the unlikeliness of Smith's allegations. Among other things, Cuhulain noted that it seemed unlikely that a sophisticated cult that had secretly existed for generations could be outwitted by a five-year-old; that the cult could hold rituals in the Ross Bay Cemetery unnoticed given that Smith claimed she was screaming and given that the Ross Bay Cemetery is surrounded on three sides by residential neighborhoods; that an 81-day non-stop ceremony involving hundreds of participants and a massive round room could have gone on in Victoria unnoticed; and that none of Smith's tormentors (other than her mother) have ever been identified, especially given that some of them had cut off one of their middle fingers at the Black Mass. He also notes that during the alleged 81-day ritual, Michelle was confirmed to be attending school, with no remarkable absences and no apparent signs that she was being abused. Like other authors, Cuhulain also noted that many of Smith's so-called recovered memories appear to have represented elements of popular culture at the time (e.g., the 1973 film The Exorcist, and the 1971 novel the film is based on) and Pazder's own religious beliefs and experiences from when he was living and working in Africa during the early 1960s. He noted it is odd that Pazder did not report to police any of the sexual abuse that Michelle allegedly had endured. Finally, Cuhulain hypothesized that Smith's motivation for making the allegations may have come from her desire to spend time with Pazder; though both were initially married to other people, they divorced their spouses and married each other after the publication of the book.

James R. Lewis, in The Oxford Handbook of New Religious Movements, wrote that Michelle Remembers "must be treated with great skepticism, not least because literally all the charges involved seem drawn from accounts of West African secret societies from the 1950s, imported to Canada." Nichol Spanos has stated that in addition to the lack of corroboration of Smith's alleged memories, "skepticism appears warranted by the fact that some of these 'memories' involve Michelle's encounters with supernatural beings". Spanos also mentions that Smith's father and unmentioned two siblings deny the allegations made by Smith, as well as Pazder's time in West Africa during a time when there was widespread concern about secret, blood-drinking, cannibalistic cults.

Despite the lack of evidence and criticism concerning the allegations made in Michelle Remembers, there are still people who believe that Smith's claims of abuse are true, and are evidence of a worldwide intergenerational satanic conspiracy to abuse and sacrifice human beings. The book allegedly inspired imitative accusations throughout the world, against members of the Church of Satan, other occultists, and others who seemed to have no association with the occult.

=== Witchcraft in City ===
The appendix to Michelle Remembers contains the reprint of the article "'Witchcraft in City' Claim" by Paul Jeune, as the article was referenced by Smith in the book concerning the alleged black magic practiced in Victoria. An evangelist named Len Olsen claimed on television evangelist David Mainse's talk show 100 Huntley Street that he and his wife were nearly sacrificed in a satanic ritual by Mark Fedoruk, also known as Lion Serpent Sun. Sun sued for defamation, and in court it was ascertained that Olsen had been delusional, apparently due to drug use and guilt; Sun was awarded $10,000 and an appeal was denied. The lawsuit and result were not reported in the book, only the original false allegations by Olsen.

== Legacy ==
The Grescoe article did not garner much attention and the allegations in Michelle Remembers were still considered by many during the early 1980s to be true. As a result, Pazder was considered to be an expert in the topic of Satanic ritual abuse. With the sudden emergence of Satanic ritual abuse cases during the 1980s (likely due in part to the publication of Michelle Remembers), Pazder's expertise was requested. In 1984, Pazder acted as a consultant in the McMartin preschool trial which featured allegations of Satanic ritual abuse. Pazder appeared on the May 16, 1985 broadcast of the popular television series 20/20, in a segment that further accelerated the spread of the panic. As part of the Cult Crime Impact Network, Pazder conducted Satanic ritual abuse seminars for police agencies during the 1980s. By 1987, Pazder reported that he was spending a third of his time consulting on Satanic ritual abuse cases. Legal prosecutors used the book as a guide when preparing cases against alleged Satanists. Prior to the start of the Kern County child abuse cases, several local social workers attended a training seminar that listed Satanic ritual abuse as a major element of child sexual abuse and used Michelle Remembers as training material.

A 2023 Skeptical Inquirer article covering Michelle Remembers states that it has had long lasting negative repercussions, including the Hampstead Hoax, Pizzagate, and the widespread belief in QAnon. It concludes that this demonstrates "the persistence of conspiracy theories over time and reminds us that no matter how much critical thinking and careful investigation might cast reasonable doubt on the belief that Satanists are dangerous child abusers, people who truly believe will continue try to warn and influence new believers."

=== Documentary ===
The 2023 documentary Satan Wants You from directors Sean Horlor and Steve J. Adams investigates the story behind the book and other Canadian origins of North America's moral panic over alleged satanic cults and ritual abuse in the 1980s.

== See also ==
- Laurel Rose Willson
- Misery literature
- Fake memoir
- Repressed memories
- Mike Warnke
- Witch hunt
