= Someone Like Me (film) =

2021 Canadian documentary film

- Film poster
- Directed by: Steve J. Adams; Sean Horlor
- Written by: Steve J. Adams; Sean Horlor
- Produced by: Teri Snelgrove; Shirley Vercruysse
- Cinematography: Blake Davey; Farhad Ghaderi
- Edited by: Graham Kew
- Music by: Edo Van Breemen; Johannes Winkler
- Production company: National Film Board of Canada
- Release date: April 29, 2021
- Running time: 80 minutes
- Country: Canada
- Languages: English; Luganda; Runyankole; Swahili

Someone Like Me is a 2021 Canadian documentary film, directed by Steve J. Adams and Sean Horlor. The film centres on Drake, a gay man from Uganda who moves to Vancouver, British Columbia as a refugee, and the group of Canadians who have agreed to sponsor him through Rainbow Refugee; it documents his arrival in Vancouver and his adaptation to Canadian life, including friction among his sponsors when all he wants to do is celebrate his new freedom by partying, and the emergence of the COVID-19 pandemic as a complicating factor.

The film premiered at the 2021 Hot Docs Canadian International Documentary Festival, where it was named one of five winners of the Rogers Audience Award. It was subsequently screened at the DOXA Documentary Film Festival.

The film was a finalist for Best British Columbia Film at the Vancouver Film Critics Circle Awards 2021, and a nominee for the DGC Allan King Award for Best Documentary Film at the 2021 Directors Guild of Canada awards.
