= Ellie Posadas =

Canadian actor

Ellie Posadas is a Canadian actor from Scarborough, Ontario. She is most noted for her role as Edna in the 2021 film Scarborough, for which she was a Vancouver Film Critics Circle nominee for Best Supporting Actress in a Canadian Film at the Vancouver Film Critics Circle Awards 2021.

Posadas is a member of the Tita Collective, a theatre group for Filipino Canadian women. She had a supporting role in the 2016 film Wexford Plaza, and has appeared in an episode of the sketch comedy series TallBoyz.

She identifies as queer.
