= Vancouver Film Critics Circle Award for Best Supporting Actress in a Canadian Film =

Canadian film award

The Vancouver Film Critics Circle Award for Best Supporting Actress in a Canadian Film is an annual award given by the Vancouver Film Critics Circle.

== Winners ==
=== 2000s ===
Year	Actress	Film	Role	Reference
2002	Meredith McGeachie	Punch	Julie	
2002	Clare Coulter	Saint Monica	Mary	
2002	Molly Parker	Max	Nina Rothman	
2003	Rebecca Harker	Moving Malcolm	Jolea Maxwell	
2003	Kristin Adams	Falling Angels	Sandy Field	
2003	Deborah Kara Unger	Emile	Nadia/Nadia's Mother	
2004	Rebecca Jenkins	Wilby Wonderful	Sandra Anderson	
2004	Ingrid Kavelaars	Intern Academy	Mira Towers	
2004	Susana Salazar	A Silent Love	Fernanda	
2005	Danielle Proulx	C.R.A.Z.Y.	Laurianne Beaulieu	
2006	Nadia Litz	Monkey Warfare	Susan	
2006	Erin Karpluk	Love and Other Dilemmas and Almost Heaven	Lucy Ladro/Catherine	
2006	Kelly Rowan	Mount Pleasant	Anne Burrows	
2007	Sonja Bennett	Young People Fucking	Mia	
2007	Christine Horne	The Stone Angel	Young Hagar	
2007	Ann Savage	My Winnipeg	Mother	
2008	Suzanne Clément	It's Not Me, I Swear! (C’est pas moi, je le jure!)	Madeleine Doré	
2008	Jayne Eastwood	Real Time	Andy's Grandmother	
2008	Maya Ritter	Finn's Girl	Zelly	
2009	Gabrielle Rose	Excited	Claire	
2009	Lisa Houle	Pontypool	Sydney Briar	
2009	Miranda Richardson	The Young Victoria	Duchess of Kent	

=== 2010s ===
Year	Actress	Film	Role	Reference
2010	Delphine Chanéac	Splice	Dren	
2010	Mélissa Désormeaux-Poulin	Incendies	Jeanne Marwan	
2010	Minnie Driver	Barney's Version	The Second Wife	
2011	Hélène Florent	Café de Flore	Carole	
2011	Jill Hennessy	Small Town Murder Songs	Rita	
2011	Hallie Switzer	I Am a Good Person/I Am a Bad Person	Sara	
2012	Sarah Gadon	Cosmopolis	Elise Packer	
2012	Samantha Morton	Cosmopolis	Vija Kinsky	
2012	Alison Pill	Goon	Eva	
2013	Lise Roy	Tom at the Farm (Tom à la ferme)	Agathe Longchamp	
2013	Romane Bohringer	Vic and Flo Saw a Bear	Florence Richemont	
2013	Gabrielle Rose	The Dick Knost Show	Kelly	
2014	Suzanne Clément	Mommy	Kyla	
2014	Sarah Allen	The Husband	Alyssa Andreas	
2014	Sarah Gadon	Enemy	Helen Claire	
2015	Tara Pratt	No Men Beyond This Point	Terra Granger	
2015	Joan Allen	Room	Nancy Newsome	
2015	Suzanne Clément	My Internship in Canada (Guibord s'en va-t-en guerre)	Suzanne	
2016	Molly Parker	Weirdos	Laura	
2016	Hannah Gross	Unless	Norah Winters	
2016	Julia Sarah Stone	The Unseen	Eva	
2017	Morgan Taylor Campbell	Gregoire	Misha	
2017	Grace Glowicki	Cardinals	Zoe Walker	
2017	Yaité Ruiz	All You Can Eat Buddha	Esmeralda	
2018	Kayla Lorette	When the Storm Fades	Clare	
2018	Gloria Demassi	Roads in February (Les routes en février)	Magda	
2018	Gabrielle Rose	Kingsway	Marion Horvat	
2019	Amber Anderson	White Lie	Jennifer Ellis	
2019	Chelah Horsdal	Ash	Gail	
2019	Catherine St-Laurent	The Twentieth Century	Ruby Elliott	

=== 2020s ===
Year	Actress	Film	Role	Ref.
2020	Rainbow Dickerson	Beans	Lily	
2020	Tina Lameman	Monkey Beach	Ma-Ma-Oo	
2020	Jennifer Jason Leigh	Possessor	Girder	
2021	Sarah Gadon	All My Puny Sorrows	Elf Von Riessen	
2021	Cherish Violet Blood	Scarborough	Marie	
2021	Brooklyn Hart	Night Raiders	Waseese	
2021	Amanda Plummer	Night Raiders	Roberta	
2021	Ellie Posadas	Scarborough	Edna	
2022	Judith Ivey	Women Talking	Agata	
2022	Marsha Stephanie Blake	Brother	Ruth	
2022	Alexandra Roberts	Until Branches Bend	Laney	
2022	Camille Sullivan	Exile	Sara Evans	
2023	Nyha Huang Breitkreuz	Seagrass	Stephanie	
2023	Wendy Crewson	Close to You	Sam's mother	
2023	Mia Goth	Infinity Pool	Gabi Bauer	
2023	Sabrina Jalees	I Used to Be Funny	Paige	
2023	Rebecca Liddiard	Seven Veils	Clea	
2023	Sophie Lorain	Testament	Suzanne Francœur	
2024	Sandra Oh	Can I Get a Witness?	Ellie	
2024	Alison Pill	Young Werther	Charlotte	
2024	Aubrey Plaza	My Old Ass	Older Elliott LaBrant	
2025	Alex Rice	Meadowlarks	Marianne	
2025	Juliette Gariépy	Mile End Kicks	Madeleine	
2025	Michelle Thrush	Meadowlarks	Gwen	
