= The Sandbox (film) =

2026 Canadian documentary film

- Directed by: Kenya-Jade Pinto
- Written by: Kenya-Jade Pinto; Rich Williamson
- Produced by: Kenya-Jade Pinto; Shasha Nakhai
- Cinematography: Luc Forsyth
- Edited by: Jordan Kawai
- Music by: Robbie Teehan
- Production company: Compy Films
- Distributed by: EyeSteelFilm
- Release date: March 17, 2026 (CPH:DOX)
- Running time: 90 minutes
- Country: Canada
- Language: English

The Sandbox is a Canadian documentary film, directed by Kenya-Jade Pinto and released in 2026. The film profiles the increasing use of technology to monitor and surveil migrants, in particular the troubling use of migrant groups as a testing ground for artificial intelligence.

The film was Pinto's debut as a filmmaker, following work as a human rights lawyer and documentary researcher. It was produced by Pinto and Shasha Nakhai for Compy Films, with executive producers including Rich Williamson, Bob Moore and Jennifer Baichwal.

The film premiered at CPH:DOX on March 17, 2026, followed by its North American premiere at the Hot Docs Canadian International Documentary Festival.
