= Cherish Violet Blood =

Kainai actress and storyteller from Canada

Cherish Violet Blood is a Kainai actress and storyteller from Canada. She is most noted for her performance as Marie in the 2021 film Scarborough, for which she won the Canadian Screen Award for Best Supporting Actress at the 10th Canadian Screen Awards in 2022.

Prior to her film debut in Scarborough, she was known for her leading role as Lila in a touring stage production of Tara Beagan's play Deer Woman. For Scarborough, she also received a Vancouver Film Critics Circle nomination for Best Supporting Actress in a Canadian Film at the Vancouver Film Critics Circle Awards 2021.

She has also appeared in the film Seeds.
