= Cynara (2023 film) =

2023 Canadian documentary film

- Directed by: Sherien Barsoum
- Written by: Sherien Barsoum
- Produced by: Sherien Barsoum; Bryn Hughes; Michelle Shephard
- Starring: Cindy Ali; James Lockyer
- Cinematography: Christian Bielz
- Edited by: Rich Williamson
- Music by: Ben Fox
- Production company: Frequent Flyer Films
- Release date: April 30, 2023 (Hot Docs)
- Running time: 88 minutes
- Country: Canada
- Language: English

Cynara is a Canadian documentary film, directed by Sherien Barsoum and released in 2023. The film centres on the disputed case of Cindy Ali, a Trinidadian Canadian woman from the Scarborough district of Toronto who was convicted in 2016 of murdering her 16-year-old daughter Cynara.

== Cast ==
- Cindy Ali
- Richard Cole as Geno Toth
- Daniel Coo as Christopher Hicks
- Tina Hardwell as District Attorney

== Background ==
On February 19, 2011, Ali called 9-1-1 to report that two men had broken into her home to demand a package, later leaving after determining that they were in the wrong home; however, during the incident, Cynara, who suffered from cerebral palsy, went into breathing distress. When first responders arrived, firefighter Semahj Bujokas doubted the home invasion story on the grounds that there were no obvious signs of break and entry; he was able to relieve Cynara's distress, but after being taken to Toronto's Hospital for Sick Children she died the next day, and Ali was charged with murder and convicted in 2016.

An appeal was launched by James Lockyer in 2020 on the grounds of significant irregularities in the case, including Bujokas' insistence that the lack of footprints in Ali's living room from snow being tracked in on the intruders' shoes showed that she was lying about the break-in, even though security camera footage from other locations in the neighbourhood clearly showed that there was no snow on the ground at the time of the incident; the trial essentially ignoring the testimony of neighbours that two men fitting the description Ali gave of the intruders were witnessed in the neighbourhood around the same time, and the existence of several prior police calls to another house in the neighbourhood whose residents' mail was frequently delivered to the Ali's house in error due to address confusion; and the judge's instruction to the jury essentially directing them to find her guilty without considering any other alternative explanations.

Ali's conviction was overturned in 2021 by the Ontario Court of Appeal, who ordered a new trial that began in October 2023. During the first week of the retrial, Lockyer additionally presented new evidence that Bujokas had sent numerous text messages directly to Barsoum about the film, suggesting that he had taken on inappropriate personal investment in the case.

On January 19, 2024, after the film's release, Cindy Ali was acquitted of all charges at her retrial.

== Distribution ==
The film premiered at the 2023 Hot Docs Canadian International Documentary Festival.

It had its broadcast premiere on Documentary on October 22, concurrently with the first week of Ali's retrial, and aired on CBC Television on February 18, 2024.

== Critical response ==
Thom Ernst wrote that "Barsoum’s film takes the audience on a disturbing, emotional journey and, through the indelible strength of a loving family in crisis, a story that is ultimately inspirational. Cynara is a film full of courage, drama, hope, and despair. Cynara innately exposes the dysfunctions in the judicial system while pulling back the curtain on institutional racism and, by doing so, reveals not just the importance but the necessity of cinema."

Writing for Point of View, Courtney Small stated that "In documenting the love and resilience of the family, Cynara disassembles the narrative of the Crown’s initial case and questions those who shaped it. While there are some lingering mysteries, in particular the authorship of the letter, the film makes it clear that an injustice took place in the initial verdict. Cindy’s experience serves as a reminder of the imbalance of power in Canada’s justice system when it decides whose words are to be considered gospel and whose are to be dismissed, especially when dealing with racialized and immigrant communities. Barsoum’s film serves as an effective warning of the dangers of such an imbalance."

== Awards ==
The film screened in the Canadian Documentary Competition at the 2023 Calgary International Film Festival.

Composer Ben Fox received a nomination for Best Original Score for a Documentary Feature Film at the 2023 Canadian Screen Music Awards.

Rich Williamson received a Canadian Screen Award nomination for Best Editing in a Documentary at the 12th Canadian Screen Awards in 2024.
