= Growing Up (memoir) =

1982 memoir by Russell Baker

- First edition
- Author: Russell Baker
- Language: English
- Genre: Memoir
- Publisher: Congdon & Weed
- Publication date: 1982
- Publication place: United States
- Pages: 278 pp.
- Awards: Pulitzer Prize for Biography or Autobiography
- ISBN: 0-86553-054-8
- OCLC: 8628636
- LC Class: PS3552.A4343 Z466 1982

Growing Up is a 1982 memoir by author and journalist Russell Baker. It chronicles Baker's youth in Virginia, and Baltimore, and his mother's strength of character during the Great Depression. It won the 1983 Pulitzer Prize for Biography or Autobiography.
