= Satan Wants You =

2023 Canadian documentary film about the Satanic panic

- Promotional release poster
- Directed by: Steve J. Adams; Sean Horlor
- Written by: Steve J. Adams; Sean Horlor
- Produced by: Michael Grand; Melissa James
- Cinematography: Blake Davey
- Edited by: Graham Kew
- Music by: Mark Dolmont
- Production company: Nootka St. Film Company
- Distributed by: Game Theory Films
- Release date: March 11, 2023 (SXSW)
- Running time: 80 minutes
- Country: Canada

Satan Wants You is a 2023 Canadian documentary film directed by Steve J. Adams and Sean Horlor. The film profiles the Satanic panic of the early 1980s, focusing on the discredited book Michelle Remembers.

== Premise ==
SXSW describes the film as telling "the untold story of how the Satanic Panic of the 1980s was ignited by Michelle Remembers, a lurid memoir by psychiatrist Larry Pazder and his patient Michelle Smith ... the bestselling book relied on recovered-memory therapy to uncover Michelle’s childhood abduction by baby-stealing Satanists. Amplified by law enforcement and America’s Daytime TV boom, satanic rumors spread through panic-stricken communities across the world, leaving a wave of destruction and wrongful convictions in their wake. This film digs deep into the roots of moral panics and cult conspiracies, showing how these events still affect and distort our reality today."

The film also reveals parallels to contemporary conspiracy theories such as QAnon, Pizzagate and LGBT grooming.

== Release and reception ==
Satan Wants You premiered at the South by Southwest (SXSW) film festival in March 2023, and had its Canadian premiere at the 2023 Hot Docs Canadian International Documentary Festival, before going into commercial release in August.

The Globe and Mail reported that "while the doc is jammed with talking heads and archival footage, Satan Wants You lacks a sense of historical and political context in which to place the delusions. Ultimately, this is a destructive cycle that has roots in everything from the Salem Witch Trials to the Affair of the Poisons in 1600s France. By the time the film starts to connect the dots between Michelle Remembers and our current age of Alex Jones and Donald Trump disinformation, the punches land softer than they should. There is a great, big, awful picture that needs to be painted here, but this doc is too preoccupied by the devil in the details of one specific, already overanalyzed case."

Collider gave the film a B− rating and stated that it "isn't just a story about moral panic but also what can happen when people become influenced by lies presented as truth." One complaint was that "the documentary wasn't given enough time to dive deep into these details. It might have worked stronger as a docuseries, but as is, it is still an impressive telling of a disturbing time in American history." The review also said that although the influence of the Catholic church in this affair is touched upon, "the institution is not held for as much blame as it should be." On that subject, Skeptical Inquirer reported that the film includes "never-before-heard recorded phone calls" revealing that the "Catholic Church was eager to finance the book’s publication and promotional tour, believing that it would inspire people to go back to church."

AIPT reported that the film took time to finds its footing, and concludes that it "is not the in depth look at the Satanic Panic some audiences may be expecting. It looks at what started it all and the damage it caused. Lives and reputations were ruined as people worried about the millions(!) of kids that were kidnapped in order to be sacrificed to the Dark Lord. It is also a cautionary tale about the ease in which mass hysteria can be caused."

Filmcarnage.com wrote that the film "gets so much right that others have gotten so wrong. Approaching such a contentious topic with an open mind, it holds back the judgement and instead explores what it means to be vulnerable, attention-hungry or manipulative. It has just enough darkness and a horror edge to its style to build a superb, gripping atmosphere. Ultimately, it asks a poignant question about the deep, reverberating damage that can be done with fearmongering, as well as a timely reminder of how much easier it is to accomplish in a social media obsessed world."

== Awards ==
The film was screened at the 2023 Fantasia Film Festival, where it was named winner of the DGC Audience Award for Best Canadian Film.

Mark Dolmont received a nomination for Best Original Score for a Documentary Feature Film at the 2023 Canadian Screen Music Awards.
