= Reunion (2020 film) =

2020 horror film

- Film poster
- Directed by: Jake Mahaffy
- Written by: Jake Mahaffy
- Produced by: Georgina Conder; Ainsley Gardiner; Nadia Maxwell; Mike S. Ryan
- Starring: Julia Ormond; Emma Draper; John Bach; Cohen Holloway; Nancy Brunning
- Cinematography: Adam Luxton
- Edited by: Jonathan Woodford-Robinson
- Music by: Steven Lord; Tim Oxton
- Distributed by: 387 Distribution
- Release dates: October 2020 (Nighstream); 5 February 2021 (New Zealand)
- Country: New Zealand
- Language: English

Reunion is a 2020 New Zealand horror film written and directed by Jake Mahaffy and stars Julia Ormond, Emma Draper, John Bach, Cohen Holloway and Nancy Brunning.

== Plot ==
Ellie returns to her family home, heavily pregnant and with a bruised eye, hoping for a quiet atmosphere to complete her book. That hope is brutually dashed as she finds her estranged mother (Ivy) and ailing father (Jack) waiting for her. Ellie’s book centers on magic during the medieval ages and its relationship to the development of science, a theme Ivy detests and claims is related to Ellie's mental instability.

As days pass in the house, it becomes clear that Ellie is being visited by the ghost (real or metaphorical) of her adopted sister, Cara. Cara was murdered in the house and for years Ellie has carried the guilt for this crime, impacting her mental health. This guilt is amplified as she spends time with her mother, who tells everyone within listening distance including Ellie herself, that Ellie is erratic, unwell, prone to seeing and hearing things that didn’t happen.

As time goes on, Ellie begins to piece together what actually happened in the house. After Ivy finds out about Jack’s affair, and the subsequent adoption of Cara, she tells her adolescent daughter that it is a betrayal of both of them. Cara, the perfect child in Jack’s eyes and the victim of his experiments, is targeted as an object of their abuse. Ellie deliberately breaks a priceless family vase and Cara is beaten for it. Cara is locked away in a bedroom to piece it together, but Ellie holds the missing piece and refuses to give it back.

Cara chases Ellie to the top of the stairs and Ivy intervenes. Ivy pushes Cara off the stairwell to her death, then immediately turns to Ellie and blames her for the death. When confronted for her lie, Ivy claims she was protecting Ellie and tells her that they need to be a family now. Ivy is relieved but Ellie continues to dream of her adopted sister and see her throughout the house.

As she follows the visions she discovers more altered memories. Images of her father, hands bloody in his study, her mother looking on coldly with a basin her hands. Jack lifts a still-beating human heart and places it in the vase that Ellie would one day break. Images of her mother chopping a baby with an ax and putting the individual parts in moving boxes.

When Ellie awakens, she sees her mother outside still burning multiple items. A cardboard box filled with occult items, the tape Ellie was hearing during her research for her book. The red dress Cara wore on the day of her death. And the vase that Ellie had been searching for all this time. Ellie bangs against the window, shouting that the vase shouldn't be burned, that it is for Cara. Her mother shouts that Ellie is making a scene - a continuation of the constant gaslighting that began with Cara's death.

Ellie runs outside and pushes the burning container over taking out the pieces of the vase out with her bare hands and finding the skeleton of a baby. Ellie stumbles back into the house. Her mother locks her in a room, as she experiences pain in her abdomen, claiming that Ellie has lost control of herself. And as she flailing about, Ellie bumps into a wall her father was peeling at, and it opens into a laboratory. Multiple babies in jars, vials, instruments are scattered about. Ivy tells her, she didn’t want Ellie to see this and they didn’t think Ellie would be able to conceive. She talks about doctors who can cut the baby out, saying she will raise it as her own, that she never had her own.

Ellie desperately tries to escape Ivy, and Cara hands her the shard of glass from the vase. Ellie stabs Ivy with it. As she holds the glass to her mother’s neck, she sees herself in the tube suggesting she and/or Cara may have been the result of experimentation. She drops the glass and locks her parents in the room. She leaves.

== Cast ==
The cast include:

- Julia Ormond as Ivy
- Emma Draper as Ellie
- John Bach as Jack
- Cohen Holloway as Gus
- Nancy Brunning as Kathy

== Release ==
The film premiered at the virtual 2020 Nightstream Film Festival in October 2020. It also was part of the Montclair Film Festival, the Telluride Horror Show, and the Indie Memphis Film Festival. Dark Sky Films released Reunion theatrically in select locations and on VOD (simultaneous release) on 5 February 2021.
