= Take Light =

- Directed by: Shasha Nakhai
- Produced by: Ed Barreveld
- Cinematography: Rich Williamson
- Edited by: Rich Williamson
- Music by: Rob Teehan
- Production company: Storyline Entertainment
- Distributed by: Documentary Channel; Gravitas Ventures
- Release date: April 8, 2018 (Cleveland)
- Running time: 78 minutes
- Country: Canada
- Language: English

Take Light is a Canadian documentary film, directed by Shasha Nakhai and released in 2018. The film profiles the energy crisis in Nigeria, where approximately half of the country's entire population lives without consistent and reliable access to the electrical power grid.

The film had its world premiere at the 2018 Cleveland International Film Festival, and its Canadian premiere at the 2018 Hot Docs Canadian International Documentary Festival. It was distributed in Canada by the Canadian Broadcasting Corporation's Documentary Channel, and internationally by Gravitas Ventures.

In 2019, Rich Williamson received a Canadian Screen Award nomination for Best Editing in Documentary at the 7th Canadian Screen Awards.
