= Night Raiders (2021 film) =

2021 science fiction film

- Theatrical release poster
- Directed by: Danis Goulet
- Written by: Danis Goulet
- Produced by: Paul Barkin; Tara Woodbury; Georgina Conder; Chelsea Winstanley; Ainsley Gardiner
- Starring: Elle-Máijá Tailfeathers; Brooklyn Letexier-Hart; Alex Tarrant; Amanda Plummer; Violet Nelson
- Cinematography: Daniel Grant
- Edited by: Jorge Weisz
- Music by: Moniker
- Production companies: Alcina Pictures; Eagle Vision; Miss Concepion Films; Uno Bravo
- Distributed by: Elevation Pictures (Canada); Rialto Distribution (New Zealand); XYZ Films (International Sales)
- Release date: March 2021 (Berlinale)
- Running time: 101 minutes
- Countries: Canada; New Zealand
- Language: English

Night Raiders is a 2021 Canadian-New Zealand science fiction dystopian film written and directed by Danis Goulet. Set in a dystopian version of North America in the year 2044, the film centres on Niska (Elle-Máijá Tailfeathers), a Cree woman who joins a resistance movement against the oppressive military government in order to save her daughter. The film stars Elle-Máijá Tailfeathers, Brooklyn Letexier-Hart, Alex Tarrant, Amanda Plummer and Violet Nelson. Taika Waititi serves as an executive producer.

The film had its worldwide premiere at the 71st Berlin International Film Festival in March 2021.

== Plot ==
In a dystopian North America in 2044, war and environmental degradation have led to the almost complete abandonment of cities and to the establishment of a totalitarian military dictatorship called the "Regime".

Niska and her eleven year old daughter Waseese live in the woods. While hunting for food, Waseese's leg is seriously injured after stepping on a trap. That night they are forced to abandon their improvised bus home after a drone discovers their dwelling. They travel by canoe to a war-torn city, where Niska is emphatic that Waseese keep her face hidden from anyone. They have a close call when a boy Waseese meets is discovered by Regime soldiers and forcibly taken away because he is under eighteen. After evading more drones and soldiers, they find shelter with Niska's old friend Roberta, who says that it would take weeks to get medicine for her leg, and suggests she give Waseese up to the soldiers like she did with her son. Although Niska would never see Waseese again, she at least will get medical care and have a comfortable life working for the Regime.

With Waseese's condition deteriorating, Niska makes the painful decision to surrender her daughter. Waseese is sent to a military academy.

Ten months later, Waseese and other children endure brutal training and indoctrination at the military academy. Niska is living in a city apartment, where a man she knows named Randy says he has obtained a way for both of them to become official citizens of the Regime, with all its benefits. While sneaking outside the Academy, Niska is captured by a group of Cree, who have been conducting secret night-time raids to rescue their kidnapped children from the academy. The female Cree leader Ida tells Niska about a prophecy of a stranger coming from the north to lead them to a place called Bigstone. Ida believes that Niska is that stranger who would lead their children to safety. A military operative of Maori descent named Leo who is helping the Cree, asks her what is more important, helping all the Cree children or rescuing her own daughter. Niska rebuffs the tribe.

Following an escape attempt, Waseese is talent-spotted by a recruiter who intends to send her to the elite Emerson Academy. Niska returns to the city, where there is an epidemic possibly caused by the food packets the drones drop. The Regime has ordered a mandatory evacuation of the population. Niska meets up with Randy and Roberta and they are forced onto an evacuation bus. Following a struggle, Niska and Leo manage to escape Regime forces but Roberta is killed by her son, who has been brainwashed into a soldier. Niska convinces Ida and Leo to help rescue her daughter in return for leading the tribe's children to safety in the north.

With the help of the hacker Charlier, Niska and Leo infiltrate Waseese's academy and free Waseese and several children. The next day Regime forces lay siege to the Cree camp with soldiers and drones. However, Waseese communes with the drones and gains their alliance, and the soldiers flee. One soldier however shoots at Waseese, and Niska shields her and is shot instead. Waseese is identified as the actual prophesied Cree guardian.

== Cast ==
- Elle-Máijá Tailfeathers as Niska
- Brooklyn Letexier-Hart as Waseese
- Alex Tarrant as Leo
- Amanda Plummer as Roberta
- Violet Nelson as Somonis
- Gail Maurice as Ida

== Production ==
The film, a coproduction of companies from Canada and New Zealand, is executive produced by Taika Waititi. Goulet has described the film as inspired in part by Alfonso Cuarón's 2006 film Children of Men, as well as by the military response to the Dakota Access Pipeline protests on the Standing Rock Sioux Reservation in 2016; in addition, the film functions in part as an allegory for the Indian residential school system.

The film was shot in the Toronto area in 2019. It was originally slated for commercial release in 2020, but was postponed to 2021 following production delays caused by the COVID-19 pandemic.

== Release ==
On February 10, 2021, Berlinale announced that the film would have its worldwide premiere at the 71st Berlin International Film Festival in the Panorama section, in March 2021. It had its Canadian premiere at the 2021 Toronto International Film Festival, and screened as the opening film of the 2021 ImagineNATIVE Film and Media Arts Festival.

It premiered commercially in October 2021, with the widest opening of any film by an indigenous director in Canadian film history. It was later released on TVOD platform in 2022.

== Reception ==
The film was mostly well-received by critics, who praised its cast and storytelling. However, the film was also criticized for its reliance on tropes of YA fiction. On the review aggregator website Rotten Tomatoes, the film has an 82% approval rating, based on 51 reviews, with an average rating of 7/10. The website's consensus reads, "Night Raiders strikes grim parallels between its dystopian setting and the present, offering a disturbing reminder that the horrors of the past are often very much still with us."

The film was named to TIFF's annual year-end Canada's Top Ten list for 2021.

== Awards ==
| Award | Date of ceremony | Category | Recipient(s) | Result | Ref(s) |
|---|---|---|---|---|---|
| Directors Guild of Canada | 2021 | DGC Discovery Award | Danis Goulet | Won | |
| Directors Guild of Canada | 2022 | Best Direction in a Feature Film | Danis Goulet | Nominated | |
| Directors Guild of Canada | 2022 | Best Picture Editing in a Feature Film | Jorge Weisz | Nominated | |
| Directors Guild of Canada | 2022 | Best Production Design in a Feature Film | Zazu Myers | Nominated | |
| Canadian Screen Awards | 2022 | Best Picture | Tara Woodbury, Paul Barkin, Ainsley Gardiner, Georgina Conder, Danis Goulet | Nominated | |
| Canadian Screen Awards | 2022 | Best Director | Danis Goulet | Nominated | |
| Canadian Screen Awards | 2022 | Best Actress | Elle-Máijá Tailfeathers | Won | |
| Canadian Screen Awards | 2022 | Best Supporting Actress | Gail Maurice | Nominated | |
| Canadian Screen Awards | 2022 | Best Original Screenplay | Danis Goulet | Won | |
| Canadian Screen Awards | 2022 | Best Casting in a Film | René Haynes | Nominated | |
| Canadian Screen Awards | 2022 | Best Costume Design | Kendra Terpenning | Won | |
| Canadian Screen Awards | 2022 | Best Makeup | Traci Loader | Won | |
| Canadian Screen Awards | 2022 | Best Sound Mixing | Lou Solakofski, Graham Rogers, Stephen Marian, Alexis Feodoroff, Tim Chaproniere | Won | |
| Canadian Screen Awards | 2022 | Best Visual Effects | Martin Tori, Darwin Go, John Mariella, Frank Reuter | Won | |
| Canadian Screen Awards | 2022 | John Dunning Best First Feature | Danis Goulet | Nominated | |
| Toronto Film Critics Association | 2021 | Rogers Best Canadian Film Award | Danis Goulet | Nominated | |
| Festival du nouveau cinéma | 2021 | National Competition, Grand Prize | Danis Goulet | Won | |
| Vancouver Film Critics Circle | 2021 | Best Canadian Film | Night Raiders | Nominated | |
| Vancouver Film Critics Circle | 2021 | Best Actress in a Canadian Film | Elle-Máijá Tailfeathers | Nominated | |
| Vancouver Film Critics Circle | 2021 | Best Supporting Actor in a Canadian Film | Alex Tarrant | Nominated | |
| Vancouver Film Critics Circle | 2021 | Best Supporting Actress in a Canadian Film | Brooklyn Hart | Nominated | |
| Vancouver Film Critics Circle | 2021 | Best Supporting Actress in a Canadian Film | Amanda Plummer | Nominated | |
| Vancouver Film Critics Circle | 2021 | Best Director of a Canadian Film | Danis Goulet | Won | |
| Vancouver Film Critics Circle | 2021 | Best Screenplay for a Canadian Film | Danis Goulet | Nominated | |
