= Steve J. Adams =

Canadian film director

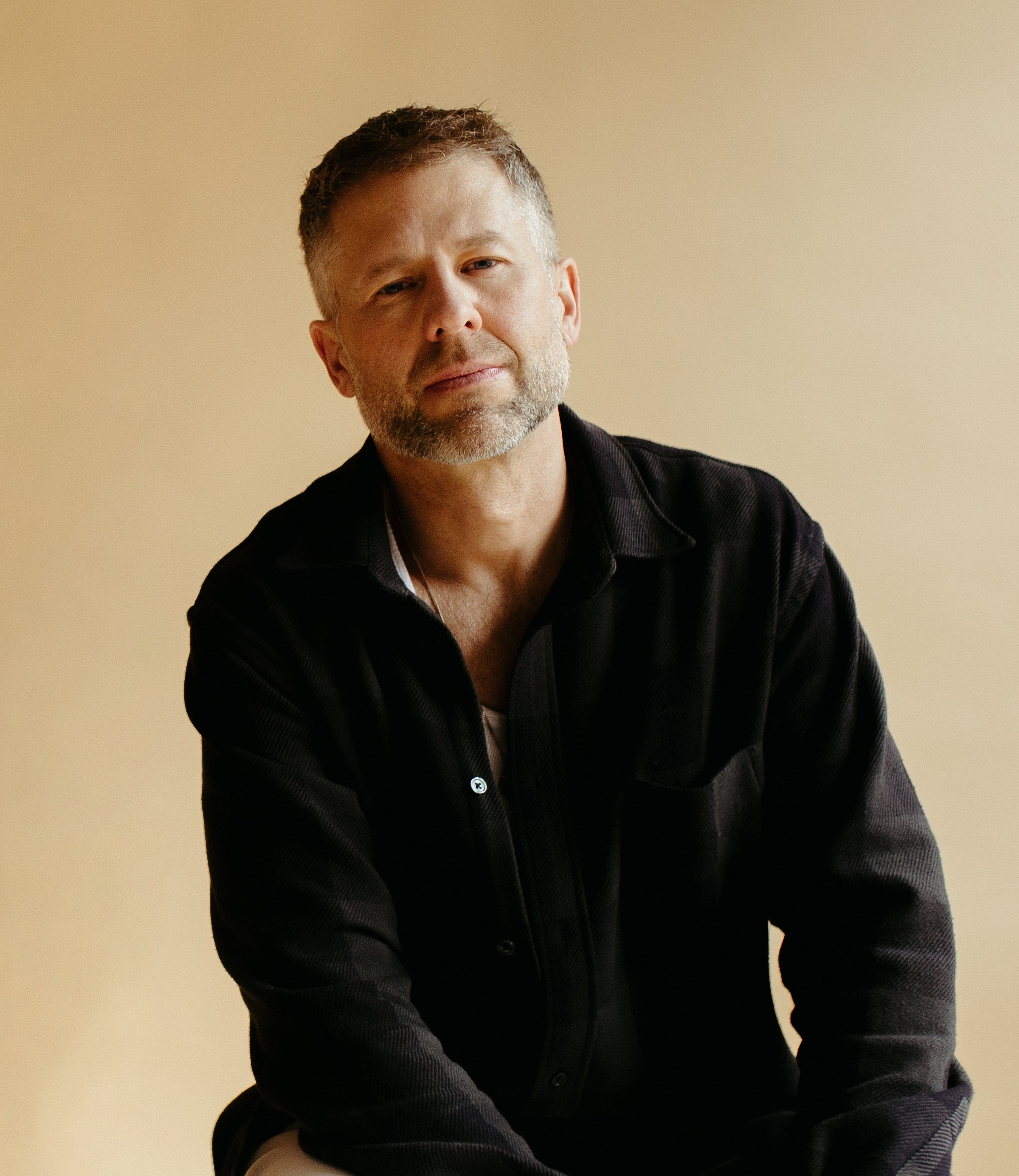
- Steve J. Adams, Canadian film director
- Occupation: Film director

Steve J. Adams is a Canadian film director, producer, and screenwriter. He is best known for co-directing documentary films with collaborator Sean Horlor under their production company Nootka Street, including Someone Like Me (2021) and Satan Wants You (2023). His work often focuses on community, identity, and cultural stories with a documentary lens.

== Career ==
=== Short films ===
Before directing feature-length documentaries, Adams worked on a number of short films and documentary projects. His credits include Just the Tip (2012), Only One (2016), A Small Part of Me (2016), Angela (2016), Hunting Giants (2017), Brunch Queen (2018), The Day Don Died (2018) and the short documentary series Dear Reader (2021).

=== Feature documentaries ===
==== Someone Like Me (2021) ====
Adams co-directed Someone Like Me with Sean Horlor. The documentary premiered at the 2021 Hot Docs Canadian International Documentary Festival, where it received a Rogers Audience Award.

The film follows Drake, a gay refugee from Uganda, and a group of Canadian volunteers who sponsor his resettlement in Vancouver, British Columbia.

The film was later named a finalist for Best British Columbia Film at the Vancouver Film Critics Circle Awards 2021, and a nominee for the DGC Allan King Award for Best Documentary Film at the 2021 Directors Guild of Canada awards. As of 2023, Adams and Horlor are no longer in a romantic relationship but continue to work together professionally.

==== Satan Wants You (2023) ====
In 2023, Adams co-directed Satan Wants You, a documentary examining the origins and cultural impact of the Satanic Panic of the 1980s and 1990s, including the influence of the book Michelle Remembers.

The film premiered at the South by Southwest Film Festival in March 2023.

== Filmography ==
=== Feature films ===
- Someone Like Me (2021) - co-director
- Satan Wants You (2023) - co-director

=== Short films and series ===
- Just the Tip (2012)
- Only One (2016)
- A Small Part of Me (2016)
- Angela (2016)
- Hunting Giants (2017)
- Brunch Queen (2018)
- The Day Don Died (2018)
- Dear Reader (2021) (series)

== Awards ==
- Rogers Audience Award (Hot Docs Canadian International Documentary Festival) for Someone Like Me (2021)
