= Georgina Conder =

New Zealand film producer

Georgina Allison Conder is a New Zealand film and TV producer. She is most noted as a producer of the 2021 film Night Raiders, which was a Canadian Screen Award nominee for Best Picture at the 10th Canadian Screen Awards in 2022.

Her other credits as a producer have included the films Free in Deed, The Breaker Upperers, Reunion and Cousins. In 2023 she produced the popular release Red, White & Brass. In 2024, she and Philippa Campbell co-produced the comedy drama film The Moon Is Upside Down.
