= Paul Barkin =

Canadian film producer

Paul Barkin is a Canadian film producer. He is most noted as a producer of the 2021 film Night Raiders, which was a Canadian Screen Award nominee for Best Picture at the 10th Canadian Screen Awards in 2022.

His other credits have included the films Apartment Hunting, Kardia, Amreeka, The Con Artist, The Colony, Stockholm and Firecrackers.

An alumnus of the Canadian Film Centre, he is the president of Alcina Pictures.
