= Liam Diaz =

Canadian actor

Liam Diaz is a Canadian actor from Toronto, Ontario. He is most noted for his performance as Bing in the 2021 film Scarborough, for which he won the Canadian Screen Award for Best Actor at the 10th Canadian Screen Awards in 2022.
