= Tara Woodbury =

Canadian film and television producer

Tara Woodbury is a Canadian film and television producer. She is most noted as a producer of the 2021 film Night Raiders, which was a Canadian Screen Award nominee for Best Picture at the 10th Canadian Screen Awards in 2022.

Formerly vice-president of development for Sphere Media, where she was an executive producer of the drama series Transplant, she joined Netflix in 2021 as manager of Canadian series development and now acts as director of content for Netflix Canada. In early 2022, she was also announced as part of the advisory committee for the new Blue Mountain Film Festival.

She is a native of Winnipeg, Manitoba, and a graduate of the University of Winnipeg.
