= Russell Baker =

American writer and satirist (1925–2019)

- Baker in 1972
- Born: Russell Wayne Baker; August 14, 1925; Loudoun County, Virginia, U.S.
- Died: January 21, 2019 (aged 93); Leesburg, Virginia, U.S.
- Education: Baltimore City College, Johns Hopkins University (Baltimore)
- Occupations: Journalist, writer, narrator
- Notable work: Growing Up (1982)
- Awards: Pulitzer Prize (1979, 1983)

Russell Wayne Baker (August 14, 1925 – January 21, 2019) was an American journalist, narrator, writer of Pulitzer Prize-winning satirical commentary and self-critical prose, and author of the Pulitzer Prize-winning autobiography Growing Up (1982). He was a columnist for The New York Times for 36 years, and hosted eleven seasons of the PBS show Masterpiece Theatre. The Forbes Media Guide Five Hundred, 1994 stated: "Baker, thanks to his singular gift of treating serious, even tragic events and trends with gentle humor, has become an American institution."

== Early life and education ==
Born in Loudoun County, Virginia, Baker was the son of Benjamin Rex Baker and Lucy Elizabeth (née Robinson). His father died of complications of diabetes, and his destitute mother moved with some of her children to her brother's house in New Jersey. At the age of eleven, as a self-professed "bump on a log", Baker decided to become a writer because he figured, "what writers did couldn't even be classified as work".

He graduated from Baltimore City College in 1943, a magnet secondary school with selective admissions and a specialized curriculum focusing on the humanities, social studies, liberal arts and classical studies. City College is the third oldest public high school in the US, founded in 1839. The school had a major influence on Baker. He wrote about his experiences at the nicknamed "Castle on the Hill" in his 1982 memoir Growing Up.

Baker earned a scholarship at nearby Johns Hopkins University, studying for a year before leaving to join the United States Navy as a pilot during World War II. He left the service in 1945 before seeing combat due to the war's ending, and returned to Hopkins for two more years, where he graduated in 1947 with a degree in English.

== Career ==
=== Journalism ===
Shortly after graduating from Johns Hopkins in 1947, Baker took a job on the night police beat at The Evening Sun, a paper oriented towards working-class readers with the largest circulation in town. In his first memoir, he describes learning his way around and working his way up experiencing the journalism trade among many legendary old-timers. He soon improved enough to be sent overseas to Britain as The Sun's London correspondent in 1952.

=== Columnist ===
Baker began writing for The New York Times in 1954 as a Washington correspondent. For the next eight years he covered the White House, United States Congress, and the United States Department of State. Beginning in 1962, he wrote the nationally syndicated "Observer" column, which he would continue for 36 years. Initially oriented toward politics, it grew to encompass a broader range of subjects and was known for its humor. During his long career as an essayist, journalist, and biographer, he was a regular contributor to national periodicals such as The New York Times Magazine, Sports Illustrated, The Saturday Evening Post, and McCalls. He was elected a fellow of the American Academy of Arts and Sciences in 1993.

=== Writer ===
Baker wrote or edited seventeen books. His first Pulitzer Prize was awarded to him for distinguished commentary for his "Observer" columns (1979) and the second one was for his autobiography, Growing Up (1982); he is one of only six people to have been awarded a Pulitzer Prize for both Arts & Letters (for his autobiography) and Journalism (for his column). He wrote a sequel to his autobiography in 1989, called The Good Times. His other works include An American in Washington (1961), No Cause for Panic (1964), Poor Russell's Almanac (1972), Looking Back: Heroes, Rascals, and Other Icons of the American Imagination (2002), and various anthologies of his columns. He edited the anthologies The Norton Book of Light Verse (1986) and Russell Baker's Book of American Humor (1993).

Baker wrote the libretto for the 1979 musical play Home Again, Home Again, starring Ronny Cox, with music by Cy Coleman, lyrics by Barbara Fried, choreography by Onna White, and direction by Gene Saks. After an unsuccessful tryout at the American Shakespeare Theatre in Stratford, Connecticut, the show closed in Toronto and never made it to Broadway. "That was a great experience," Baker said in a 1994 interview with the Hartford Courant. "Truly dreadful, but fun. I was sorry [the show] folded because I was having such a good time. But once is enough."

=== Television host and narrator ===
Baker replaced Alistair Cooke as the regular host and commentator of the PBS long-running drama television series Masterpiece Theatre, beginning with season 22 (1992–93) and continuing for over a decade through season 33 (2003–04). "That's talking-head stuff," he said. "Television is harder than I thought it was. I can't bear to look at myself. I fancied that I was an exceedingly charming, witty and handsome young man, and here's this fidgeting old fellow whose hair is parted on the wrong side."

In 1995, he narrated the Ric Burns documentary The Way West about American western expansion for The American Experience, a long-running documentary series then in its ninth season on PBS.

== Personal life ==
In 1950, Baker married Miriam Nash, who died four years before him in 2015. The couple had four children, Allen, Kasia, Michael, and Phyllis.

Baker died at his longtime home in Leesburg, Virginia, on January 21, 2019, after complications following a fall. He was 93.

== Legacy ==
In the preface to Conscientious Objections, media theorist Neil Postman described Baker as "like some fourth century citizen of Rome who is amused and intrigued by the Empire's collapse but who still cares enough to mock the stupidities that are hastening its end. He is, in my opinion, a precious national resource, and as long as he does not get his own television show, America will remain stronger than Russia." (1991, xii)

== Awards and honors ==
- 1978 – George Polk Award for Commentary
- 1979 – Pulitzer Prize Winner in Commentary
- 1983 – Pulitzer Prize Winner in Biography
- 1993 – Golden Plate Award of the American Academy of Achievement
- 1998 – George Polk Award for Career Achievements
- Baltimore City College Hall of Fame

Preceded by Alistair Cooke	Host of Masterpiece Theatre; 1993–2004	Succeeded by Gillian Anderson
