= Scarborough (2021 film) =

2021 Canadian film

- Theatrical release poster
- Directed by: Shasha Nakhai; Rich Williamson
- Screenplay by: Catherine Hernandez
- Based on: Scarborough by Catherine Hernandez
- Produced by: Shasha Nakhai
- Starring: Liam Diaz; Mekiya Essence Fox; Anna Claire Beitel; Aliya Kanani; Ellie Posadas; Cherish Violet Blood
- Cinematography: Rich Williamson
- Edited by: Rich Williamson
- Music by: Robbie Teehan
- Production company: Compy Films
- Distributed by: LevelFILM
- Release date: September 10, 2021 (TIFF)
- Running time: 136 minutes
- Country: Canada
- Language: English

Scarborough is a 2021 Canadian drama film, directed by Shasha Nakhai and Rich Williamson. An adaptation of Catherine Hernandez's 2017 novel Scarborough, the film centres on the coming of age of Bing (Liam Diaz), Sylvie (Mekiya Essence Fox) and Laura (Anna Claire Beitel), three young children in a low-income neighbourhood in the Scarborough district of Toronto, as they learn the value of community, passion and resilience over the course of a school year through an after-school program led by childhood educator Ms. Hina (Aliya Kanani).

The cast also includes Ellie Posadas as Bing's mother Edna, who has recently left her abusive husband but is doing her best to give Bing a stable and loving home environment; Cherish Violet Blood as Marie, Sylvie's mother whose husband's disability has reduced their family to living in a motel, and who is struggling to get the medical system to diagnose her son Johnny (Felix Jedi Ingram Isaac) when he begins to show signs of autism; and Kristen MacCulloch and Conor Casey as Laura's parents Jessica and Cory, a drug addict and a former skinhead who are both ill-equipped to care for a young child and regularly ship her back and forth between their homes with little regard for her own needs.

== Production ==
The film was shot primarily in the Galloway Road neighbourhood of Scarborough.

Hernandez indicated that she had received numerous offers from filmmakers to adapt her novel, but felt that many of the proposals were too slick and polished and not in keeping with the character of the community, so instead she approached Nakhai and Williamson due to their background as documentary filmmakers.

In advance of the film's premiere, a cast reading of the screenplay was staged as part of the 2020 Toronto Reel Asian International Film Festival. The film premiered on September 10, 2021 at the 2021 Toronto International Film Festival.

== Critical response ==
Radheyan Simonpillai of Now wrote that "The film can be hard to watch at times, but its focus is largely on the small joys and a thriving sense of community despite the circumstances. The most memorable moments are the helping hands, the little wins or the kids at play, whether in a Dollarama or a nail salon. That pretty much encapsulates the Scarborough spirit."

For the National Post, Chris Knight wrote that "You’re going to need a store of sympathy before sitting down to Scarborough’s two and a quarter hours. Sure, it’s easy to feel for the kids. But the parents are just as deserving of our understanding...Not that Scarborough is a sad film, though it does have moments of tragedy and even heartbreak. But the overwhelming mood is one of resilience – the ways people find to make ends meet and even have a little fun on the side, with whatever is at hand. (There’s a schmaltzy ending that the film totally earns.)"

Barry Hertz of The Globe and Mail wrote that "each child goes through tremendously traumatic episodes – including one third-act incident that nearly shattered my spirit – but it is all in the service of telling stories that will awaken you to the lives of others outside your own socioeconomic bubble. This isn’t poverty porn or fly-by-night exploitation – absolutely everything onscreen feels earned, honest, lived-in. And, somehow, crowd-pleasing, too. For a movie centring on abuse, discrimination and societal isolation, Scarborough will leave you with the urge to rise up and applaud. Crucial to this cinematic alchemy is the work of the film’s young cast: Diaz, Fox and Beitel never feel less than real children caught in untenable situations. Charming and compelling, each performer arrives like a star already past the point of “up-and-coming.” As much as anything else in Scarborough, the three actors are proof that the future – of the neighbourhood, of Canadian film – is bright as you can imagine."

Emma Badame of That Shelf had special praise for the performances of the trio of young children at the centre of the story, writing that "Beitel communicates so much with just a look, breaking your heart with her fragility over and over. Fox captures Sylvie’s openness to the world around her with ease. It’s not hard to understand how this one little girl has befriended so many different members of her neighbourhood, regardless of their background or age. Then there’s Diaz, who channels Bing’s intelligence and insecurity so well that his Canadian Screen Awards Best Actor nomination seemed almost a foregone conclusion. The film closes on a moment of personal triumph for Bing that requires the young actor to sing and dance and not only does he nail it, but he lands the layered emotions of the moment too. An impressive act to pull off for any veteran of the screen, never mind one new to the profession."

== Reception ==
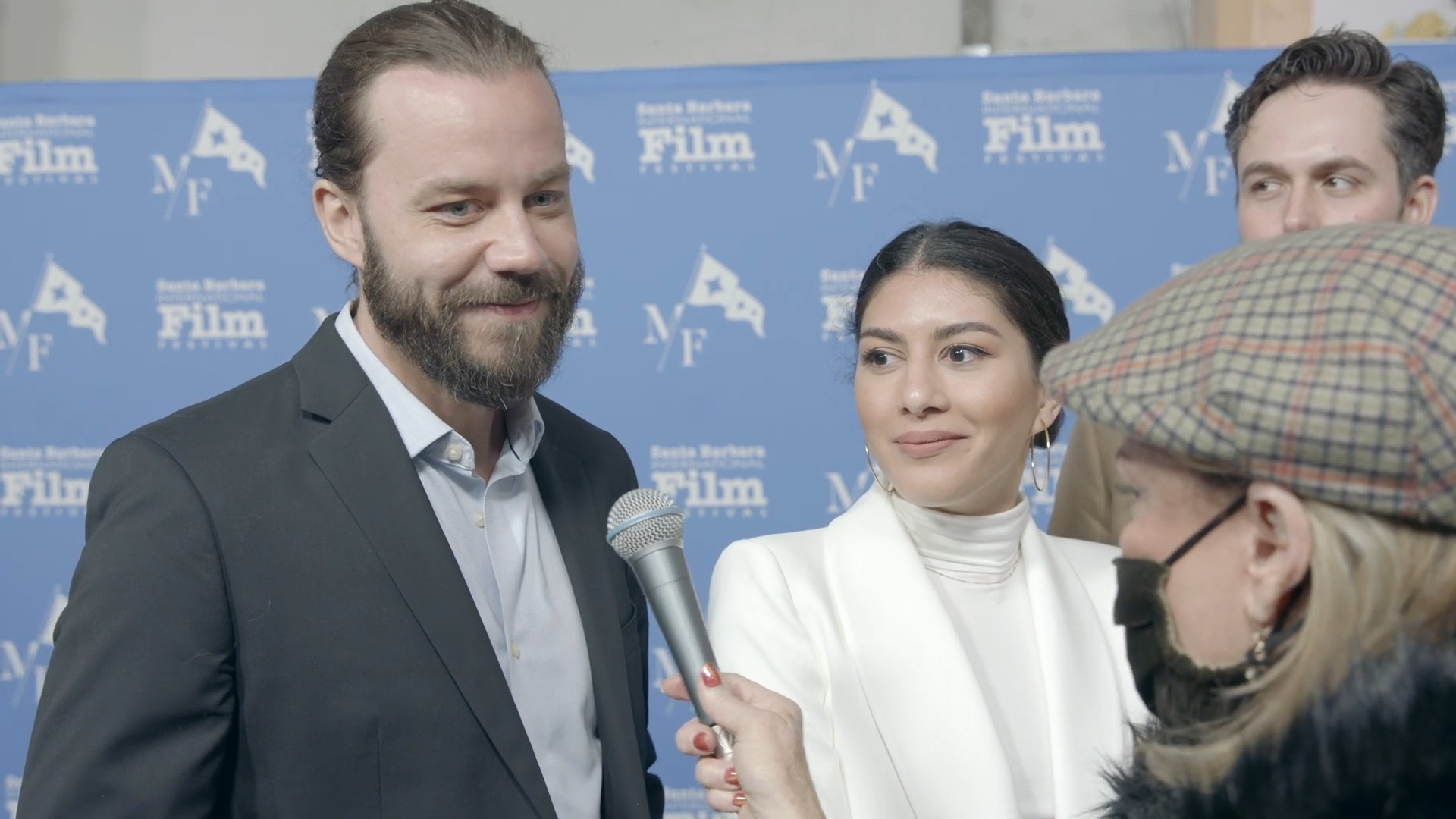
Williamson and Nakhai at the Santa Barbara International Film Festival

The film was named to TIFF's annual year-end Canada's Top Ten list for 2021.

| Award | Date of ceremony | Category | Recipient(s) | Result | Ref(s) |
|---|---|---|---|---|---|
| Toronto International Film Festival | 2021 | People's Choice | Scarborough | Runner-up | |
| Toronto International Film Festival | 2021 | Best Canadian Film | Scarborough | Honored | |
| Toronto International Film Festival | 2021 | Changemaker Award | Shasha Nakhai, Rich Williamson | Won | |
| Canadian Screen Awards | 2022 | Best Motion Picture | Shasha Nakhai | Won | |
| Canadian Screen Awards | 2022 | Best Director | Shasha Nakai, Rich Williamson | Won | |
| Canadian Screen Awards | 2022 | Best Actor | Liam Diaz | Won | |
| Canadian Screen Awards | 2022 | Best Actress | Aliya Kanani | Nominated | |
| Canadian Screen Awards | 2022 | Best Supporting Actress | Cherish Violet Blood | Won | |
| Canadian Screen Awards | 2022 | Best Adapted Screenplay | Catherine Hernandez | Won | |
| Canadian Screen Awards | 2022 | Best Casting in a Film | Shasha Nakhai, Rich Williamson | Won | |
| Canadian Screen Awards | 2022 | Best Cinematography | Rich Williamson | Nominated | |
| Canadian Screen Awards | 2022 | Best Sound Editing | Krystin Hunter, Paul Germann, Stefana Fratila | Won | |
| Canadian Screen Awards | 2022 | Best Sound Mixing | Eric Taylor, Miles Roberts, Matt Chan | Nominated | |
| Canadian Screen Awards | 2022 | John Dunning Best First Feature | Shasha Nakhai, Rich Williamson | Won | |
| Toronto Film Critics Association | 2021 | Rogers Best Canadian Film Award | Shasha Nakhai, Rich Williamson | Nominated | |
| Vancouver Film Critics Circle | 2021 | Best Canadian Film | Shasha Nakhai, Rich Williamson | Nominated | |
| Vancouver Film Critics Circle | 2021 | Best Supporting Actress in a Canadian Film | Cherish Violet Blood | Nominated | |
| Vancouver Film Critics Circle | 2021 | Best Supporting Actress in a Canadian Film | Ellie Posadas | Nominated | |
| Vancouver Film Critics Circle | 2021 | Best Director of a Canadian Film | Shasha Nakhai, Rich Williamson | Nominated | |
| Vancouver Film Critics Circle | 2021 | Best Screenplay for a Canadian Film | Catherine Hernandez | Nominated | |
