= Lawrence Pazder =

Canadian psychiatrist and author (1936–2004)

- Born: April 30, 1936; Edmonton, Alberta, Canada
- Died: March 5, 2004 (aged 67); Victoria, British Columbia, Canada
- Occupation: Psychiatrist
- Known for: Participation in the satanic ritual abuse moral panic; co-author of the discredited book Michelle Remembers

Lawrence Pazder (April 30, 1936 – March 5, 2004) was a Canadian psychiatrist and author. Pazder wrote the discredited biography Michelle Remembers, published in 1980, with his patient (and eventual wife) Michelle Smith, which claimed to detail satanic ritual abuse.

== Background ==
Pazder was born in Edmonton, Alberta, on April 30, 1936, and completed his medical training in 1961. He practiced medicine in Nigeria from 1962 to 1964. Pazder returned to Canada in 1964 and completed his psychiatric training at McGill University in 1965.

Pazder was a devout Catholic. He founded the Anawim Companions Society in Victoria to provide a temporary home for street people that would allow them to reintegrate into society.

Pazder and his first wife Marylyn had four children together and were married for many years, until he developed a relationship with his patient Michelle Smith. Court documents filed in the divorce proceedings indicated that between March 1977 and June 1979 Pazder disappeared with Smith (co-author of Michelle Remembers) for lengthy periods of time. In 1979, Pazder was divorced by his first wife and later married Smith.

During his professional career, Pazder worked in Victoria, British Columbia until his death.

Pazder died in his home on March 4, 2004. No autopsy was carried out to confirm his cause of death, which Michelle described as a heart attack in the obituary.

== Michelle Remembers and satanic ritual abuse ==
In 1973, Pazder first started treating a woman named Michelle Smith in his private psychiatric practice in Victoria. In 1976, when Pazder was treating Smith for depression (related to her having had a miscarriage), Smith confided she felt that she had something important to tell him, but could not remember what it was. Soon thereafter, Pazder and Smith had a session where Smith allegedly screamed for 25 minutes non-stop and eventually started speaking in the voice of a five-year-old. The book claims that Smith used self hypnosis to recover memories of alleged satanic ritual abuse, that would have occurred during 1954 and 1955 when Smith was five years old, at the hands of her mother and others, whom Smith alleges were members of a Satanic cult in Victoria. As Pazder believed he was on the verge of uncovering a vast satanic conspiracy, he eventually would spend many hours at a time treating Smith during a 14-month period. So convinced of the problem of satanic ritual abuse, Pazder and Smith travelled to the Vatican in 1978 to alert the Catholic church about the previously unknown dangers to children posed by Satanic cults worldwide. Pazder and Smith co-authored Michelle Remembers about the chronicles of the therapy sessions and purported recovered memories, using scientifically discredited methods. Michelle Remembers was the first published survivor account of alleged satanic ritual abuse and was a publishing success, earning Pazder and Smith a $100,000 hard-cover advance and $242,000 for paperback rights.

After the publication of Michelle Remembers, Pazder was considered to be an expert for the topic of satanic ritual abuse. With the sudden development of satanic ritual abuse cases during the 1980s (likely due to the publication of Michelle Remembers), Pazder's supposed expertise was requested. In 1984, Pazder acted as a consultant in the McMartin preschool trial. Pazder also appeared on the first major news report on Satanism (broadcast on May 16, 1985), by ABC's television series 20/20. In the report titled "The Devil Worshippers", Pazder discussed the clues that he felt indicated satanic practices. Pazder also participated in the first national seminar at which law enforcement were introduced to the satanic ritual abuse of children (in Fort Collins, Colorado, on September 9–12, 1986). Subsequently, Pazder was part of the CCIN (Cult Crime Impact Network) and lectured to police agencies about satanic ritual abuse during the late 1980s along with other speakers such as Mike Warnke. By 1987, Pazder reported that he was spending a third of his time consulting on satanic ritual abuse cases.

Pazder coined the term 'ritual abuse' to describe the type of abuse that Smith alleged. At a professional conference in Richmond, Virginia in 1987, Pazder defined ritual abuse of children as "repeated physical, emotional, mental, and spiritual assaults combined with a systematic use of symbols and secret ceremonies designed to turn a child against itself, family, society and God". Pazder alleged that "the sexual assault in these cases has ritualistic meaning and is not driven by sexual gratification." Pazder claimed that "The pure group of 'orthodox satanists' is never seen or identified in public, yet it is this group of satanists who plant the seeds and encourage all the more visible satanic groups".

Further investigations into the allegations made in Michelle Remembers found no evidence to support them and satanic ritual abuse is considered to be a moral panic.

== See also ==
- Misery literature
- Laurel Rose Willson
- Bennett Braun
