= Shasha Nakhai =

Filipino-Iranian Canadian film director

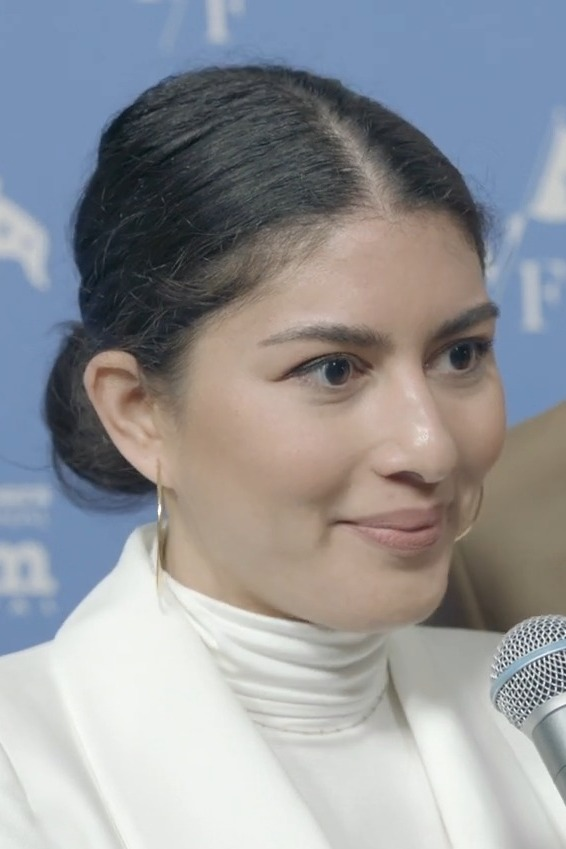
- Occupations: film director, producer
- Years active: 2010s-present
- Known for: Take Light, Scarborough

Shasha Nakhai is a Filipino-Iranian Canadian film director, most noted as co-director with Rich Williamson of the 2021 film Scarborough. The film won the Canadian Screen Award for Best Picture, and Nakhai and Williamson won the award for Best Director, at the 10th Canadian Screen Awards in 2022.

A partner with Williamson in the production firm Compy Films, she first became known for her 2018 documentary film Take Light, which was a CSA nominee for Best Short Documentary at the 5th Canadian Screen Awards in 2017. She was also a producer of Williamson's short documentary film Frame 394, which was a CSA nominee for Best Short Documentary at the 5th Canadian Screen Awards in 2017.

Scarborough, codirected by Nakhai and Williamson as their debut narrative feature film, premiered at the 2021 Toronto International Film Festival. It was named the winner of the Changemaker Award, was first runner-up for the People's Choice Award, and received an honorable mention from the jury for the Best Canadian Film award. It was nominated for the Toronto Film Critics Association's Rogers Best Canadian Film Award.

Her other films have included The Sugar Bowl (2011), Paruparo (2013), 18 Roses (2016), The Hole in Reservoir Hill (2018) and Thirty Eight Minutes (2020).

In 2026 she was a producer of Kenya-Jade Pinto's documentary film The Sandbox.
