= Rich Williamson (filmmaker) =

Canadian film director, cinematographer and editor

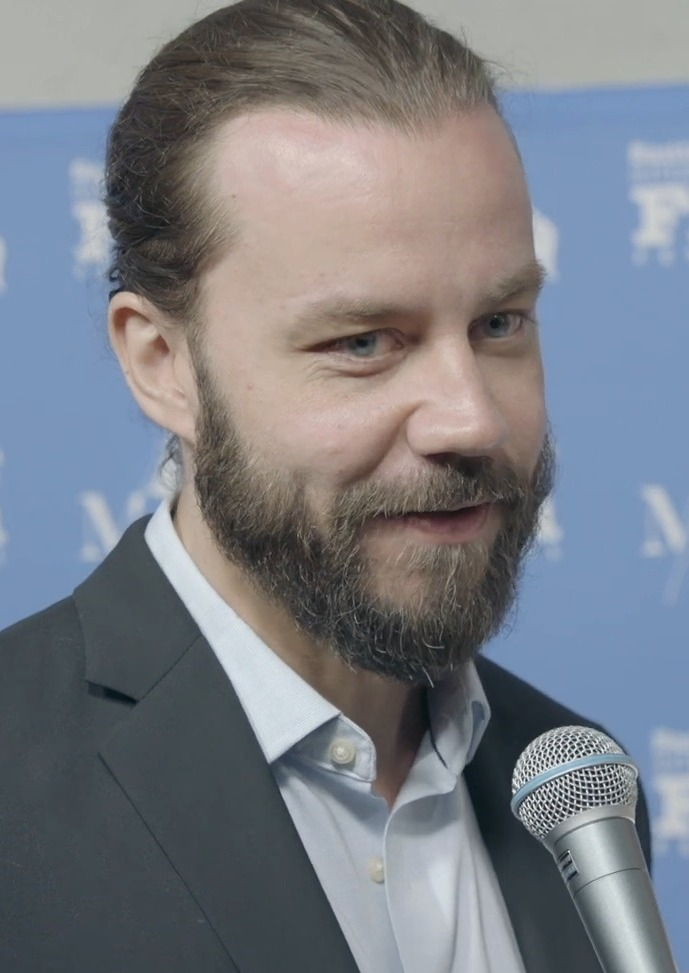
- Occupations: film director, producer, cinematographer, editor
- Years active: 2010s-present
- Known for: Frame 394, Scarborough

Rich Williamson is a Canadian film director, cinematographer and editor, most noted as codirector with Shasha Nakhai of the 2021 film Scarborough. The film won the Canadian Screen Award for Best Picture, and Nakhai and Williamson won the award for Best Director, at the 10th Canadian Screen Awards in 2022.

A partner with Nakhai in the production firm Compy Films, he first became known for his 2016 short documentary film Frame 394, which was a CSA nominee for Best Short Documentary at the 5th Canadian Screen Awards in 2017.

He was also a CSA nominee for Best Editing in a Documentary at the 7th Canadian Screen Awards in 2019 for his work on Nakhai's documentary film Take Light, and at the 12th Canadian Screen Awards in 2024 for Cynara.

Scarborough, codirected by Nakhai and Williamson as their debut narrative feature film, premiered at the 2021 Toronto International Film Festival. It was named the winner of the Changemaker Award, was first runner-up for the People's Choice Award, and received an honorable mention from the jury for the Best Canadian Film award. It was nominated for the Toronto Film Critics Association's Rogers Best Canadian Film Award.

His other films have included Prom Day (2009), The Sugar Bowl (2011), Joe (2012), Freelance (2014), The Unsinkable Captain John (2014), The Hole in Reservoir Hill (2018) and Thirty Eight Minutes (2020).

In 2026 he was an executive producer of Kenya-Jade Pinto's documentary film The Sandbox.
