= Morgan Doctor =

American–Canadian musician

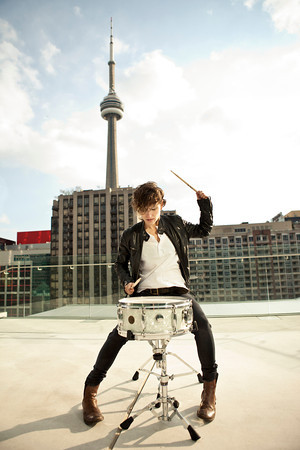
- photo by Connie Tsang

Background information
- Born: Los Angeles, United States
- Origin: Los Angeles, United States
- Occupations: Musician, composer
- Instruments: Drums, percussion
- Label: Aporia Records
- Website: morgandoctor.com

Morgan Doctor (date of birth unknown) is an American–Canadian musician who is a solo artist, and film composer living in Toronto, Ontario, and Los Angeles.

== Biography ==
Morgan Doctor moved to Toronto from Los Angeles in 1999 and has since moved back to LA and has played over a thousand dates all over the US, Canada and Europe with such artists as Andy Kim, The Cliks, Chantal Kreviazuk, Raine Maida, Sandra Bernhard, Ron Sexsmith, Feist, Fefe Dobson, Tamara Williamson and Kevin Drew. Some artists Morgan has been billed alongside on tour throughout the U.S. and Canada include Cyndi Lauper, B-52's, Tegan and Sara, The Cult, The New York Dolls, Indigo Girls, the Gossip, Dresden Dolls, Debbie Harry, and Stars. She has also appeared on MTV Cribs Canada, The Late Show with David Letterman, The Late Late show with Craig Ferguson, in Modern Drummer magazine and is a regular contributor to Tom Tom Magazine.

In 2022, Morgan scored LAST FLIGHT HOME which was short listed for an Oscar. Her most recent movie THE NEW AMERICANS premiered at 2023 SXSW film festival.

With over fifteen years of recording and performing experience, Morgan Doctor is a kit player who has developed a diverse repertoire of drumming and percussion skills. In addition to drum kit, she is classically trained on the tablas and plays an array of percussion including such obscure instruments as the Swiss made Hang. Morgan's session drumming has turned up on TV and film soundtracks including the CBC Metro Morning, The L Word, and Grey's Anatomy.

Morgan performed at and won MTV LOGO's "Artist on the Brink" Award for 2008 with The Cliks. She received a Dora nomination for her sound design for Between Us Goddess in 2005 and earned a Juno and Dora nomination with her work with the Toronto Tabla Ensemble where she fused her East Indian, Jazz and pop styles on the kit. In 2005, she went on to earn a second Dora nomination for original sound design for theater. Much of Morgan's playing style has been influenced by her studies with renowned jazz drumming instructor Jim Blackley. Her most recent work includes playing on Chantal Kreviazuk's single "Into Me" Warner Music. She has appeared on David Letterman, Craig Ferguson and in Modern Drummer magazine.

== Solo albums ==
In 2006, Morgan signed with Aporia Records and has released three solo albums with them. Her solo work can be heard on TV shows such as WordTravels (OLN/National Geographic Channel), and radio shows such as DNTO, Hear and Now and The Signal (theme song). Upon the immediate release of her 2009 album Other Life, she made #1 on the Toronto Star's Anti-Hit List. Her latest album, Major Over Minor, came out March 19, 2013, on Aporia Records.

== Endorsements ==
Morgan is endorsed by Vic Firth, Yamaha Drums, Evans Drum Heads d'addario and Zildjian.

== Discography ==
- Is This Home (Aporia Records, 2006)
- Other Life (Aporia Records, 2009)
- Major Over Minor (Aporia Records, 2013)

== Album appearances ==
- Chantal Kreviazuk "Into Me" (Warner Music, 2015)
- The Cliks Snakehouse (Tommy Boy/ Warner Bros. Records, 2006)
- The Cliks Dirty King (Tommy Boy/ Warner Bros. Records, 2009)
- Melissa Laveaux Camphor and Copper (No Format Records, 2008)
- Lily Frost Cine-Magique (Aporia Records, 2006)
- David Newman Leap of Grace (Pranamaya Music, 2005)
- David Newman Into The Bliss (Nettwerk, 2006)
- Gabrielle Roth Bardo (Raven Recordings, 2001)
- Gabrielle Roth Still Chillin' (Raven Recordings, 2005)
- Tamara Williamson The Arms of Ed (Aporia Records/Ocean Music, 2000)
- Tamara Williamson Racing Horses (Aporia Records/Ocean Music, 2002)
- Tamara Williamson The Boat (Ocean Music Records, 2005)
- Toronto Tabla Ensemble Fire Dance (Tihai Records, 1999)
- Toronto Tabla Ensemble Weaving (Naxos World, 2001)
- Toronto Tabla Ensemble Alankar (Tihai Records, 2008)
- Chinchilla Little King EP (Revelation Records, 1998)
- Chinchilla 101 Italian Hits (Revelation Records, 1998)

== See also ==
- Andy Kim
- The Cliks
- list of female drummers
