= List of female drummers =

This is a list of notable female drummers.

== A ==
- Valerie Agnew (7 Year Bitch)
- Annette A. Aguilar (StringBeans)
- Carla Azar (Autolux)

== B ==
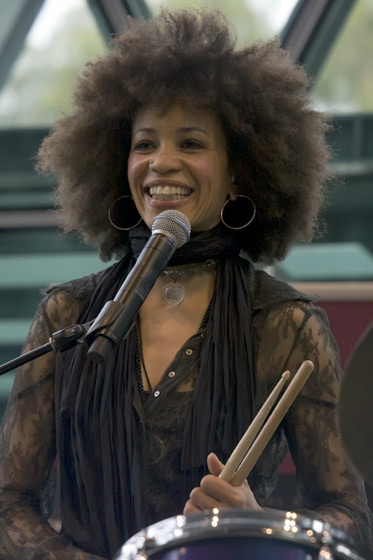
Cindy Blackman

- Lori Barbero (Babes in Toyland)
- Christina Billotte (Bratmobile)
- Cindy Blackman (Santana, Lenny Kravitz, Jack Bruce, Pharoah Sanders, Ron Carter)
- Hannah Blilie (Gossip, Shoplifting)
- Rachel Blumberg (The Decemberists, M.Ward, Bright Eyes, Mirah, Jolie Holland, Califone, Death Vessel)
- Elaine Bradley (Neon Trees)
- Nandi Bushell

== C ==
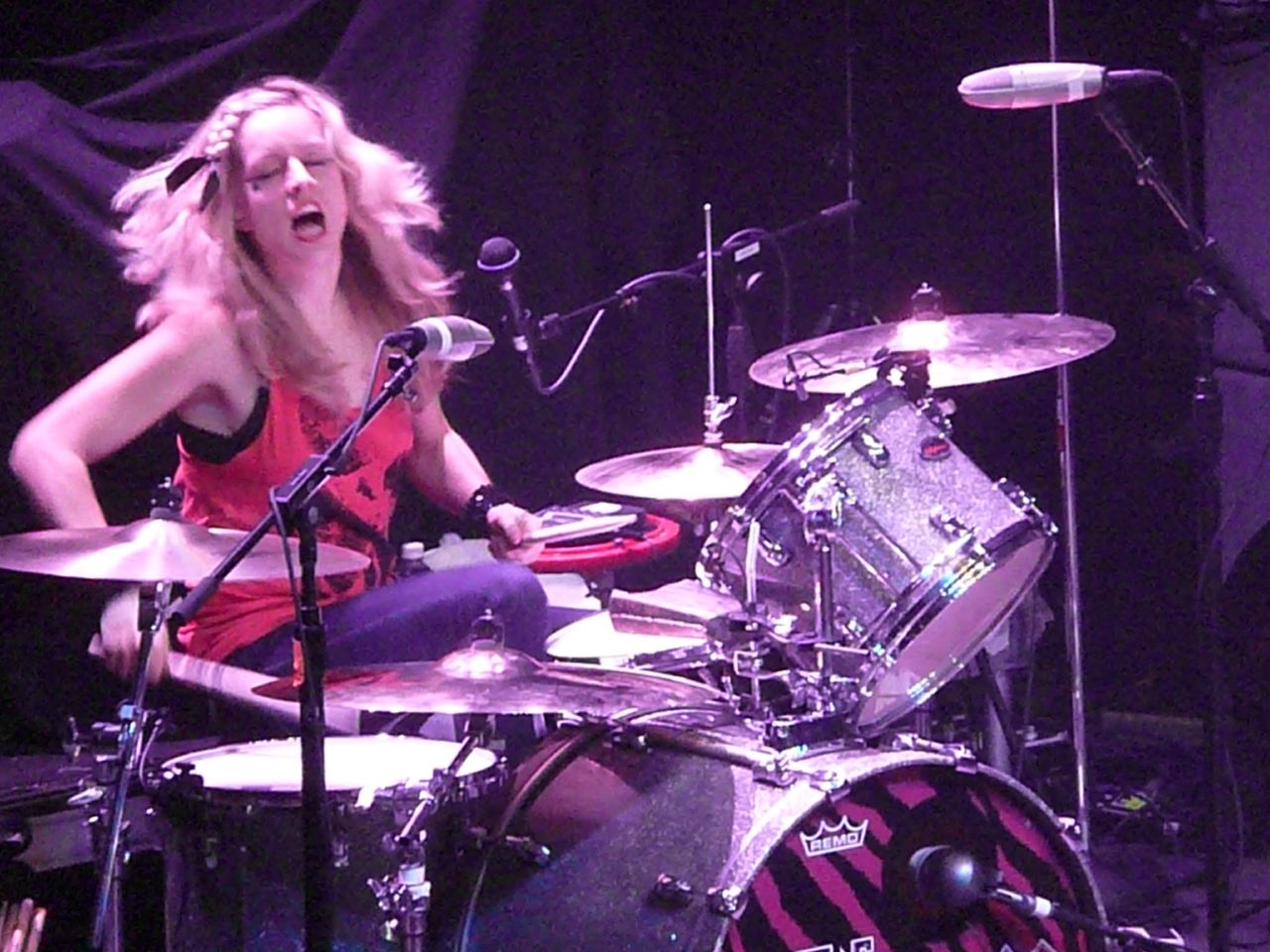
Torry Castellano

- Rachel Carns (The Need)
- Karen Carpenter (The Carpenters)
- Terri Lyne Carrington (Dizzy Gillespie, Stan Getz, Herbie Hancock)
- Neko Case (Maow)
- Torry Castellano (The Donnas)
- Régine Chassagne (Arcade Fire)
- Gemma Clarke (The Suffrajets, Babyshambles)
- Meytal Cohen
- Caroline Corr (The Corrs)

== D ==
- Adrienne Davies (Earth)
- Jessica Dobson
- Morgan Doctor (The Cliks, Andy Kim)

== E ==
- Sheila Escovedo (Sheila E.)
- Jan Errico (The Vejtables, The Mojo Men)

== F ==
- Amy Farina (The Evens)
- Florrie (Xenomania)
- Kathy Foster (All Girl Summer Fun Band)
- Temim Fruchter (The Shondes)

== G ==
- Evelyn Glennie
- Claudia Gonson (The Magnetic Fields)

== H ==
- Bobbye Hall (Bob Dylan, Janis Joplin, Marvin Gaye, Stevie Wonder, Carole King, Bill Withers, Pink Floyd, Tom Waits, Dolly Parton)
- Kathleen Hanna
- Kree Harrison
- Elaine Hoffman Watts
- Brie Howard-Darling (Fanny)
- Georgia Hubley (Yo La Tengo)

== I ==
- Susie Ibarra

== J ==
- G. B. Jones (Fifth Column)
- Sarah Jones (Hot Chip, NYPC, Harry Styles)

== K ==
- Senri Kawaguchi

== L ==
- Honey Lantree of the Honeycombs, ("Have I the Right?") - one of the first female rock drummers

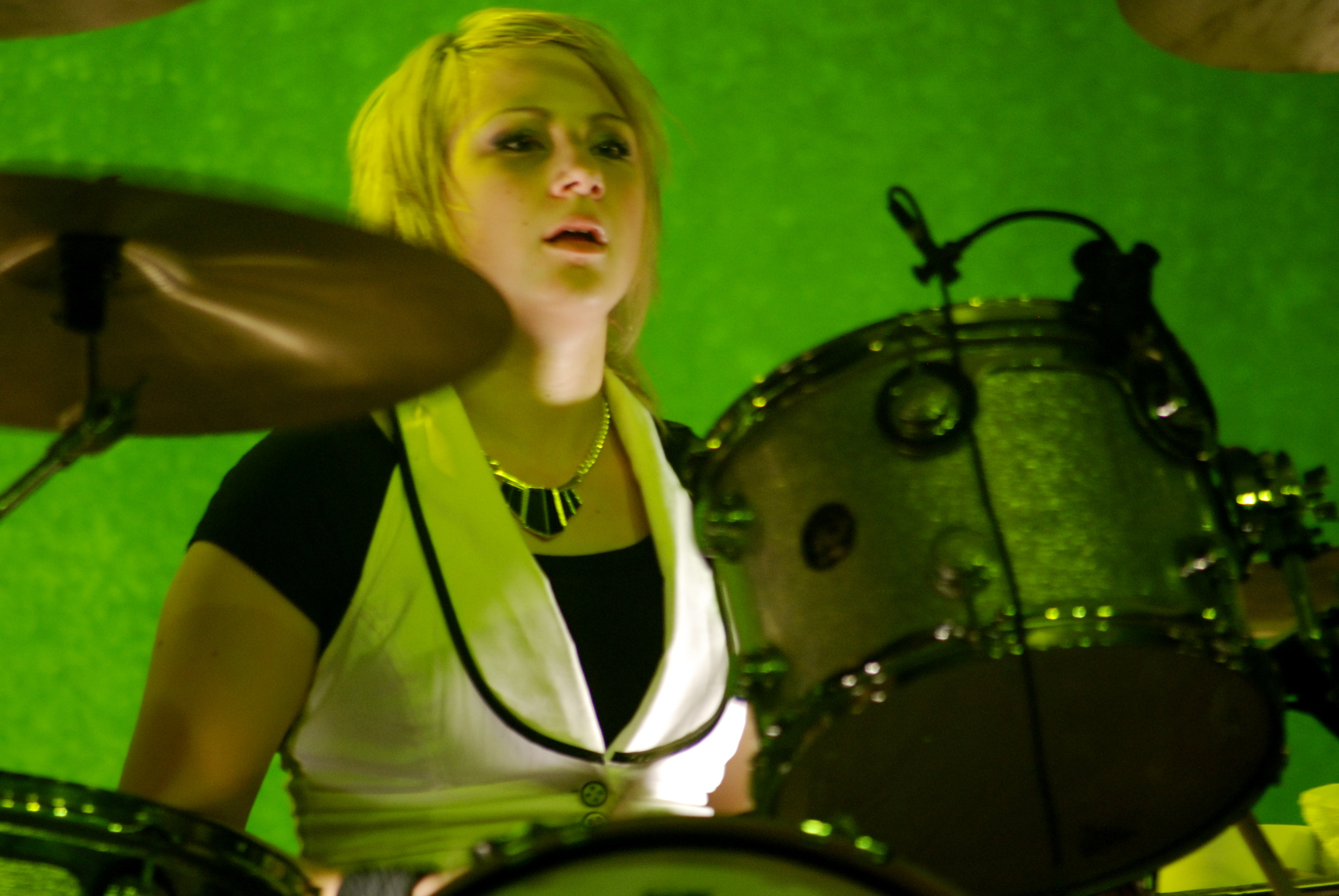
Jen Ledger

- Gladys de la Lastra - Panamanian national icon
- Jen Ledger (Skillet)
- Athena Lee (KrunK)
- Heather Lewis
- Jody Linscott (The Who, David Gilmour, Elton John)
- Sara Lund (Unwound)

== M ==
- Madonna (The Breakfast Club)
- Samantha Maloney (Hole, Mötley Crüe, Eagles of Death Metal)
- Akiko Matsuura (The Big Pink)
- Marilyn Mazur
- Linda McDonald (The Iron Maidens)
- Gayelynn McKinney
- Rose Melberg
- June Miles-Kingston (Everything But The Girl)
- Allison Miller
- Stanton Miranda
- Clare Moore (The Moodists)
- Ikue Mori (DNA)
- Lindy Morrison (The Go-Betweens)
- Stella Mozgawa (Warpaint, Courtney Barnett)

== N ==
- Molly Neuman (Bratmobile, The Frumpies, The PeeChees)
- Anika Nilles (Jeff Beck, Rush (band))

== O ==
- Cherisse Osei (Simple Minds, Paloma Faith)

== P ==
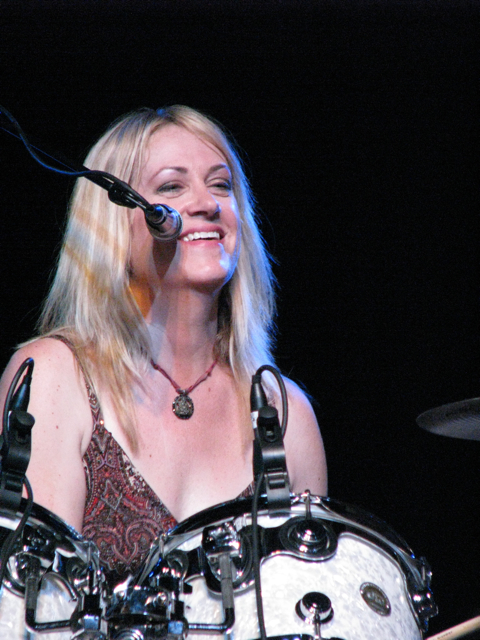
Debbi Peterson

- Palmolive (The Slits, The Raincoats, The Flowers of Romance)
- Mia Park
- Juanita Parra
- Lucy Patané
- Roxy Petrucci (Vixen)
- Demetra Plakas (L7)
- Paula P-Orridge (Psychic TV)
- Yoshimi P-We (Boredoms)

== Q ==
- Suzette Quintanilla (Selena y Los Dinos)

== R ==
- Frankie Rose (Dum Dum Girls, Vivian Girls)
- Dawn Richardson (4 Non Blondes, Bad Radio)

== S ==
- Kate Schellenbach (Beastie Boys, Luscious Jackson)
- Patty Schemel (Hole)
- Kim Schifino (Matt and Kim)
- Gina Schock (The Go-Go's)
- LaFrae Sci
- Dalia Shusterman (Hopewell, Bulletproof Stockings)
- Hilarie Sidney (The Apples in Stereo)
- Viola Smith
- Shannyn Sossamon (Warpaint)
- Scarlett Stevens (San Cisco)

== T ==
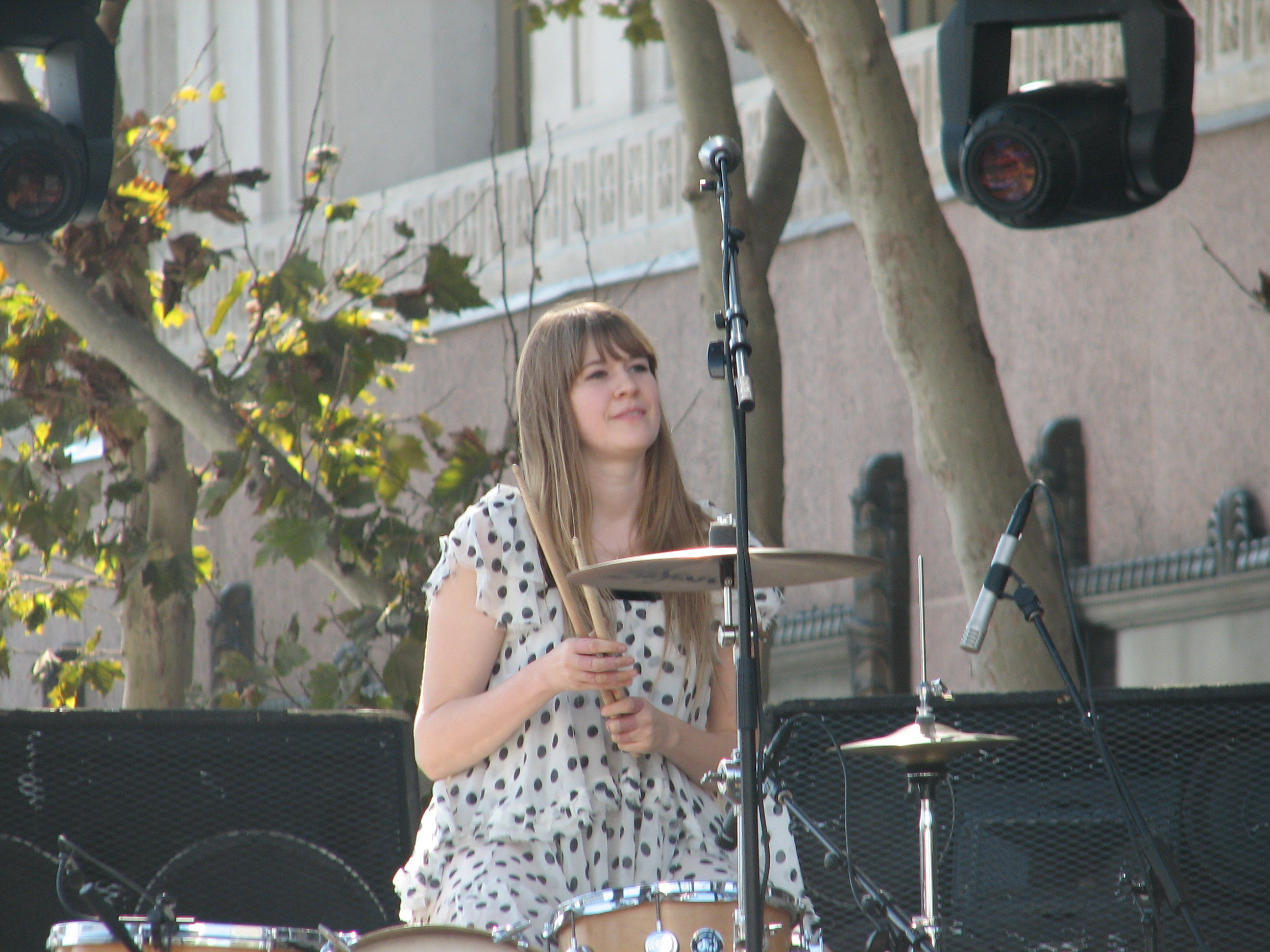
Tennessee Thomas

- Audrey Tait (Franz Ferdinand)
- Teresa Taylor (Butthole Surfers)
- Tennessee Thomas (The Like, NAF)
- Kimberly Thompson
- Lynn Truell (The Dicks, Sister Double Happiness, Imperial Teen)
- Maureen Tucker (The Velvet Underground)

== U ==
- Ruth Underwood (Frank Zappa)

== V ==
- Tobi Vail (Bikini Kill)
- Paulina Villarreal (The Warning)
- Sandra Vu (Dum Dum Girls)

== W ==
- Alicia Warrington (Chris Rene)
- Janet Weiss (Sleater-Kinney, Quasi, Wild Flag)
- Hannah Welton (3rdeyegirl)
- Sandy West (The Runaways)
- Meg White (The White Stripes)
- Kathi Wilcox (Bikini Kill)

== Y ==
- Akane Yonezawa (Ave Mujica)
- Melissa York (Born Against, Team Dresch)

== See also ==
- List of drummers
