= Richie Shazam =

American model

Richie Shazam Khan, known artistically as Richie Shazam, is an American model, photographer, and writer.

== Career ==
=== Modelling ===
Shazam made her runaway debut for Vivienne Westwood. She has walked at New York Fashion Week and London Fashion Week, and has modelled for Gypsy Sport, Andreas Kronthaler, MISBHV, Fleur du Mal, and Rachel Comey.

She signed with IMG Models in March 2021.

=== Photography ===
Shazam has shot for Interview and Thom Browne and has had her photography featured in Vogue.

In July 2020, she collaborated with the Copenhagen-based fashion label Ganni to sell two of her photographs, Black Trans Lives Matter, NYC 2020 and Self Portrait, NYC 2019. All proceeds went to the Marsha P. Johnson Institute and For the Gworls. She has also sold portraits to support COVID relief efforts in India and NYC.

=== Television ===
Shazam co-hosted Fuse docu-series Shine True alongside Lucas Silveira.

== Personal life ==
Shazam was born to Guyanese immigrants and raised in Queens, New York. He attended middle school and high school in Manhattan and Brooklyn, and was often bullied by his peers. His mother died when he was in high school. Shazam majored in international relations at Trinity College and studied in South Africa and Argentina before going on to work at a number of galleries and museums.

He is non-binary and feminine-presenting. In 2021, he began a relationship with Ben Draghi.
