= Tom Tom Magazine =

Drum magazine

- Spring 2011 cover of Tom Tom
- Editor-in-chief: Mindy Abovitz
- Categories: Music, drumming
- Frequency: Quarterly
- Founder: Mindy Abovitz
- Founded: 2009
- First issue: November 2009; 16 years ago
- Final issue Number: January 2019; 7 years ago 36
- Based in: New York City
- Website: tomtommag.com
- OCLC: 701318561

Tom Tom Magazine was a quarterly print magazine and website based out of New York City. It was founded in 2009 by Mindy Abovitz who served as editor-in-chief; its last issue was published in 2019. It was the only magazine in the world dedicated to female drummers. According to the magazine's website, "Tom Tom's purpose is to raise awareness about girl and women percussionists from all over the world, to inspire females of all ages to drum, and to strengthen and build the otherwise fragmented community of female musicians." Tom Tom Magazine is distributed in the United States, as well as in Europe, Australia, South America and Japan and has many international subscribers and readers.

== History ==
Tom Tom Magazine was established by Mindy Abovitz around December 2008/January 2009. initially as a way to collate articles about female drummers, after searching on Google and finding either poor or offensive results. She started a Blogspot page, where she interviewed herself. The blog's popularity grew, and in November 2009, Tom Tom was first published as a quarterly glossy magazine.

== Features ==
Tom Tom Magazine included many features including news, reviews, fashion and art. It also covers many topics such as technique for drummers, reviews of bands with female drummers, and reviews of equipment. Other segments of Tom Tom included “One Drummer One Question” in which female drummers respondedto one particular question, and “Throwback” which featured bands with female drummers from the past.

Many notable female drummers have been featured in Tom Tom Magazine. These drummers include Stella Mozgawa (Warpaint), Kim Schifino (Matt and Kim), Erica Garcia, Morgan Doctor, Bianca Sparta (Erase Errata), MNDR, Tune-Yards, Boom Boom Satellites, Terri Lyne Carrington, Patty Schemel, Carla Azar, Dawn Richardson and Paulina Villarreal (from The Warning). 'Cover' Drummers featured on the cover of Tom Tom Magazine include Cindy Blackman, Susie Ibarra, Kim Thompson (Beyoncé), Sheila E., Palmolive, Janet Weiss, Suphala, Evelyn Glennie, Yoshimi and Sara Lund (Unwound).

== Events ==
In addition to being a print magazine, a website, and a social media community, Tom Tom Magazine throws events that celebrate female drummers, beat makers, musicians and DJ. Tom Tom has also set up panels and events at universities and colleges. These panels promote and discuss feminism, and women's representation in the media. Tom Tom has held events in

- Brooklyn, NY
- Manhattan, NY
- Portland, OR
- Austin, TX
- Miami, FL
- Los Angeles, CA
- Palm Springs, CA
- Barcelona, Spain
- London, UK

Tom Tom Magazine has also hosted panels at schools such as Carnegie Mellon University, Smith College, UCSD, New School, Guilford College and Cal Arts. Tom Tom's panels have included prominent figures and celebrities including Yuka Honda, Kim Gordon of Sonic Youth, Shirley Braha, creator of the television show New York Noise, Marisa Meltzer author of "How Sassy Changed My Life", and Emily Rems of Bust Magazine.

Among the artists that have performed at Tom Tom events are Kim Thompson, Vivian Girls, Mi-Gu, Tune-Yards, Emily Wells, The Suzan, and MNDR.

== Contributors and staff ==
Mindy Abovitz (Publisher/Creator/Editor-in-Chief)

Marisa Kurk (Head Designer)

Rebecca DeRosa (Reviews Editor)

Melody Berger (Managing Editor)

Photographers Bex Wade, Bek Andersen, Stefano Galli, Jee Young Sim, Jennifer Leigh Aschoff, Erin Nicole Brown, Rebecca Smeyne, Piper Fergueson, Aaron Wojack, Andrew Strasser, Meg Wachter, Ports Bishop, Jay Oligny, Dan Watkins, Holly Andres.

Tom Tom TV Anthony Lozano, Anthony Buhay, Karl Lind

Regional Correspondents Lisa Schonberg, Valentine Freeman (Northwest Correspondent), Liv Marsico, Nicole Turley (LA Correspondents), Laura Fares, Megane Quashie (London Correspondents), Kiran Gandhi (DC Correspondent), Emi Karaya (Japan Correspondent), Rachel Thorne (Australia Correspondent), Sam Low & Sal Harrington (Bristol Team)

Writers/Contributors Evelyn Glennie, Allie Alvarado, Temim Fruchter, sts, Rachel Bloomberg, Farah Joan Fard, Dawn Richardson, Leslie Henkel, Adam Katzman, Sara Magenheimer, Caryn Havlik, Melanie Glover, Morgan Doctor, Alex Carulo, Bianca Russelburg, Adee Roberson, Michael Lowe, Fiona Campbell, Courtney Gillette, Stephanie Barker (Tech Editor), Anika Sabin (Review Editors), Fred Armisen, Brian Chase

Past Contributors include: Jessica Moon (Design Team), Harlo Holmes (Webmistress/Coder), Katyann Gonzalez (Web Editor), Candice Ralph (Head Designer), Angela Cheng, Tiny Favorite, Alex Carulo, Sean Desiree (Events), Cathy Hsiao, Teri Duerr (Copy Editors) Hannah Cristina, Linnea Lamon, Lindsay Birk, Stephanie Monohan, Katie Dvorsky, Jami Forshee (Interns)
