= Snakehouse =

Studio album by The Cliks
- Released: April 24, 2007
- Genre: Alternative rock
- Length: 39:48
- Label: Warner Music Canada; Tommy Boy Records United States
- Producer: Moe Berg

The Cliks chronology
The Cliks (2004)	Snakehouse (2007)	Dirty King (2009)

Singles from Snakehouse
- 1. "Oh Yeah" Released: 2007; 2. "Complicated" Released: January 30, 2007; 3. "Eyes In the Back of My Head" Released: 2007

Professional ratings
Review scores
Source	Rating
AllMusic	3.5/5 stars

Snakehouse is the first album by the Canadian rock band The Cliks, released in 2007.

== Critical reception ==
Exclaim! wrote that the group "wield a power behind their songwriting that is conveyed through barebones sincerity and skilfully delivered sonic explosions that hammer out fierce arrangements and defiant melodies." The Chicago Tribune called the album a "collection of guitar-driven stomach-churners ... amplified by [Silveira's] fiery vocals and a sense that he's not willing to stay silent anymore." The Cleveland Scene described it as "Joan Jett-size riffs dished out with a side of power-pop stomp."

== Track listing ==
All songs by Lucas Silveira, except "Cry Me a River" by Tim Mosley, Scott Storch and Justin Timberlake.

1. "Complicated" - 4:35
2. "Cry Me a River" - 4:31
3. "Misery" - 3:42
4. "Eyes In the Back of My Head" - 3:19
5. "Soul Back Driver" - 3:33
6. "Start Leading Me On" - 3:12
7. "Whenever" - 3:48
8. "Oh Yeah" - 4:34
9. "Nobody Else Will" - 4:49
10. "Back In Style" - 3:40
