= Bernal, Argentina =

City in Buenos Aires Province, Argentina

Bernal
- City
- Ciudad de Bernal
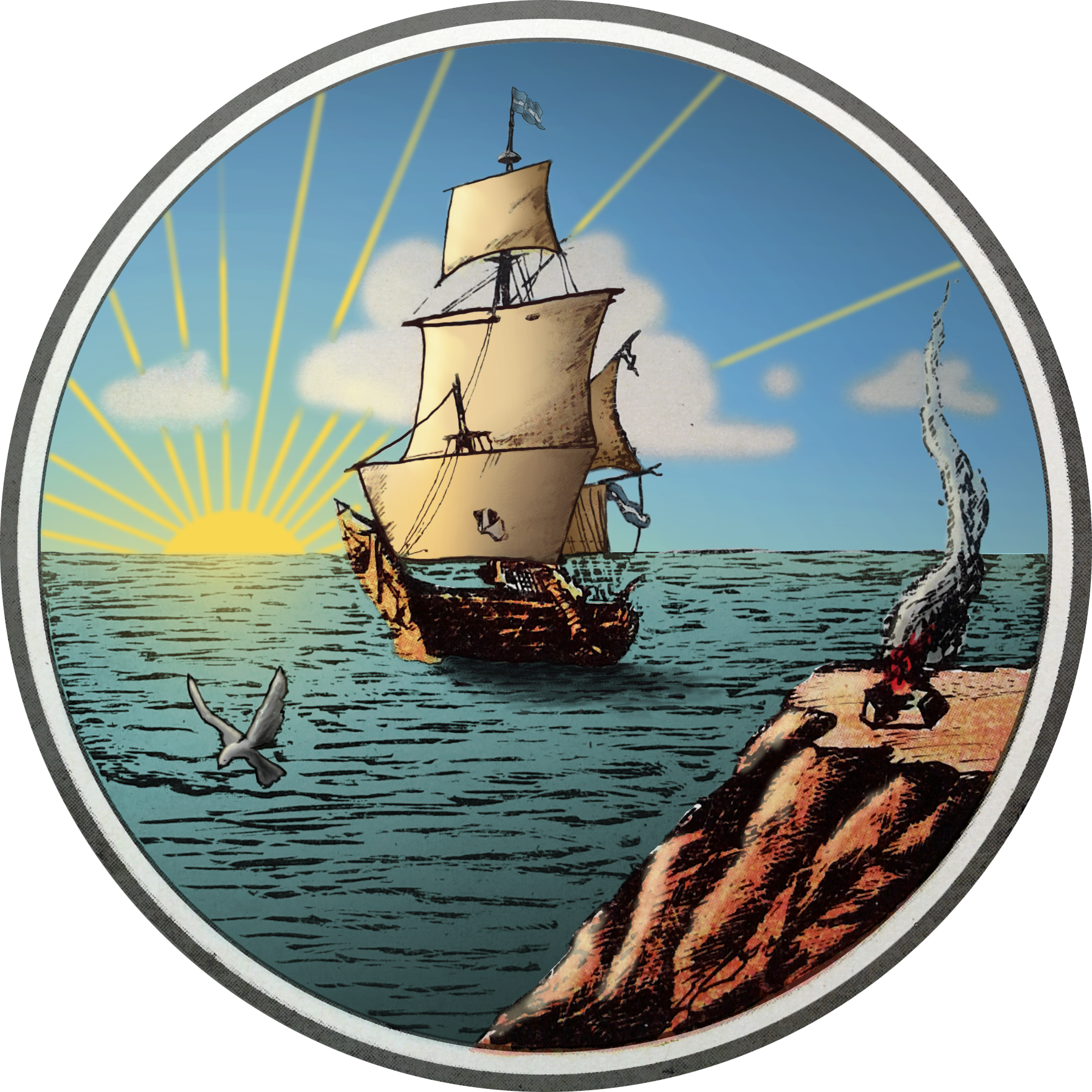
- Seal

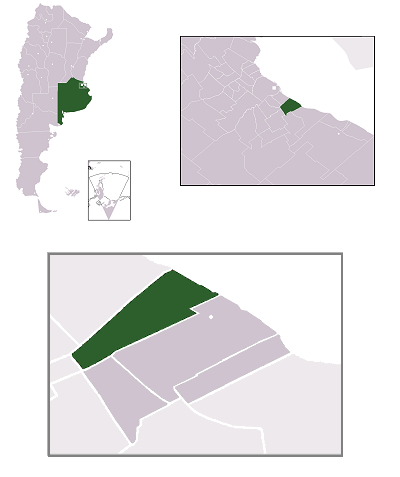
- Location in Quilmes

- Location in Greater Buenos Aires
- Coordinates: 34°42′00″S 58°17′00″W
- Country: Argentina
- Province: Buenos Aires Province
- Partido: Quilmes
- Founded: 1850
- Declared city: 1970
- Founder: Pedro Bernal

Government
  - Mayor: Mayra Mendoza (Union for the Homeland)

Area
  - Total: 23.62 km^{2} (9.12 sq mi)
- Elevation: 16 m (52 ft)

Population (2001)
  - Total: 130,790
  - Density: 5,537.26/km^{2} (14,341.4/sq mi)
- Time zone: UTC-3 (P)
  - Summer (DST): UTC-2 (O)
- Código Postal (CP): B1876
- Website: www.quilmes.gov.ar

Bernal is a city located in the northeast of Quilmes in the province of Buenos Aires, approximately 10 miles south of the city of Buenos Aires. It is the second largest and most populated city in the Partido of Quilmes. Bernal borders Avellaneda Partido and Lanús Partido to the north-west, the city of Quilmes to the south-east, Almirante Brown Partido and Lomas de Zamora Partido to the south-west the Río de la Plata to the north-east.

Bernal consists of the neighborhoods of Barrio Parque, Villa Cramer, Villa Alcira, and Bernal Centre, among others. The Railway General Roca divides the city in two.

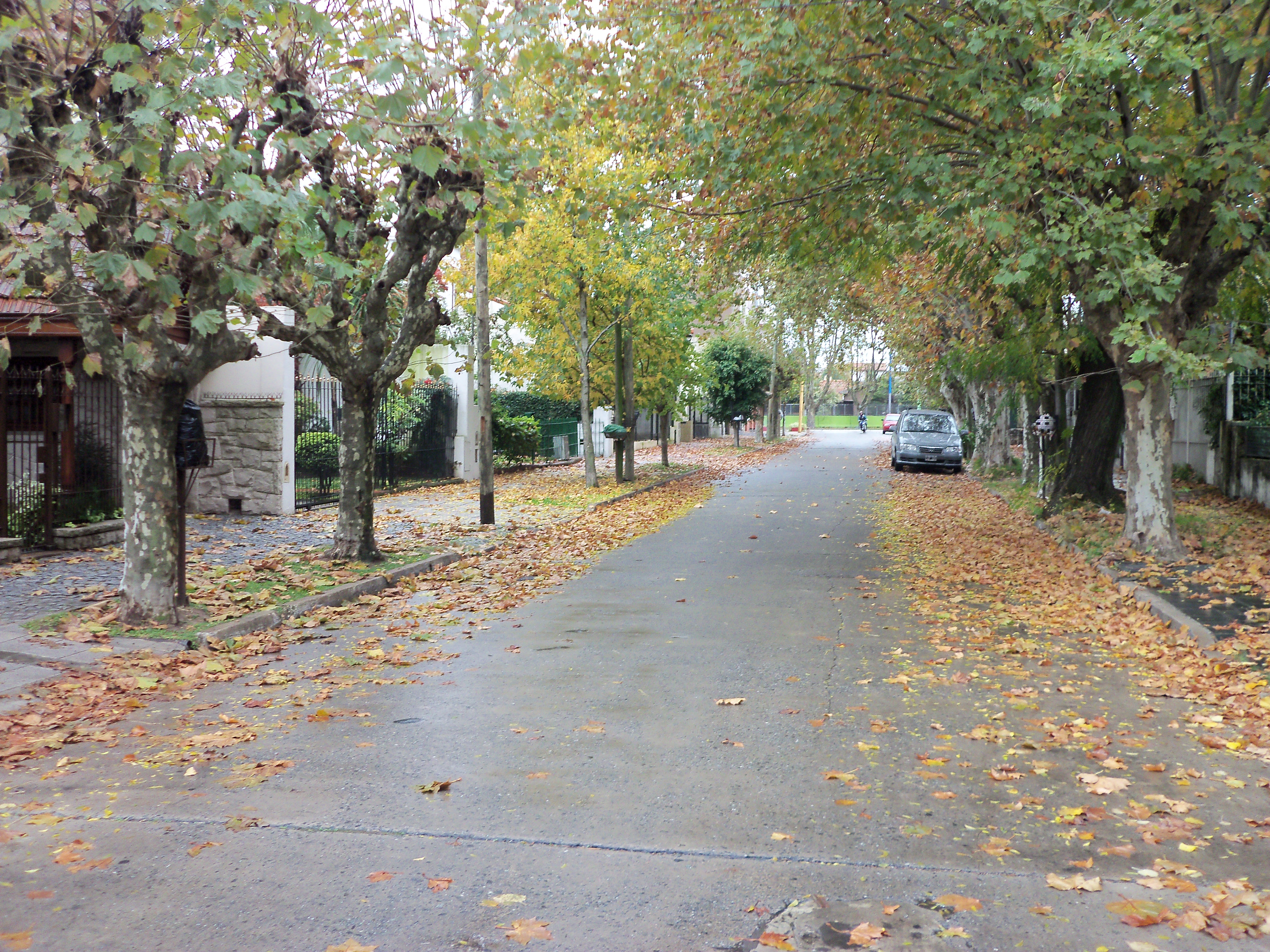
Zeballos Street, Bernal, Buenos Aires Province

== History ==
The Bernals were an old family from the days of colonial Buenos Aires. In the mid-19th century, a descendant of the family, Don Pedro Bernal, established a farm in the Partido of Quilmes, and built a house on that site. In 1850, he divided the land up into smaller farms which were then settled by other prominent families, such as the Molina Salas, Ayersa, Tasso, and Bagley. 1850 is deemed as the official foundation year of the City of Bernal.

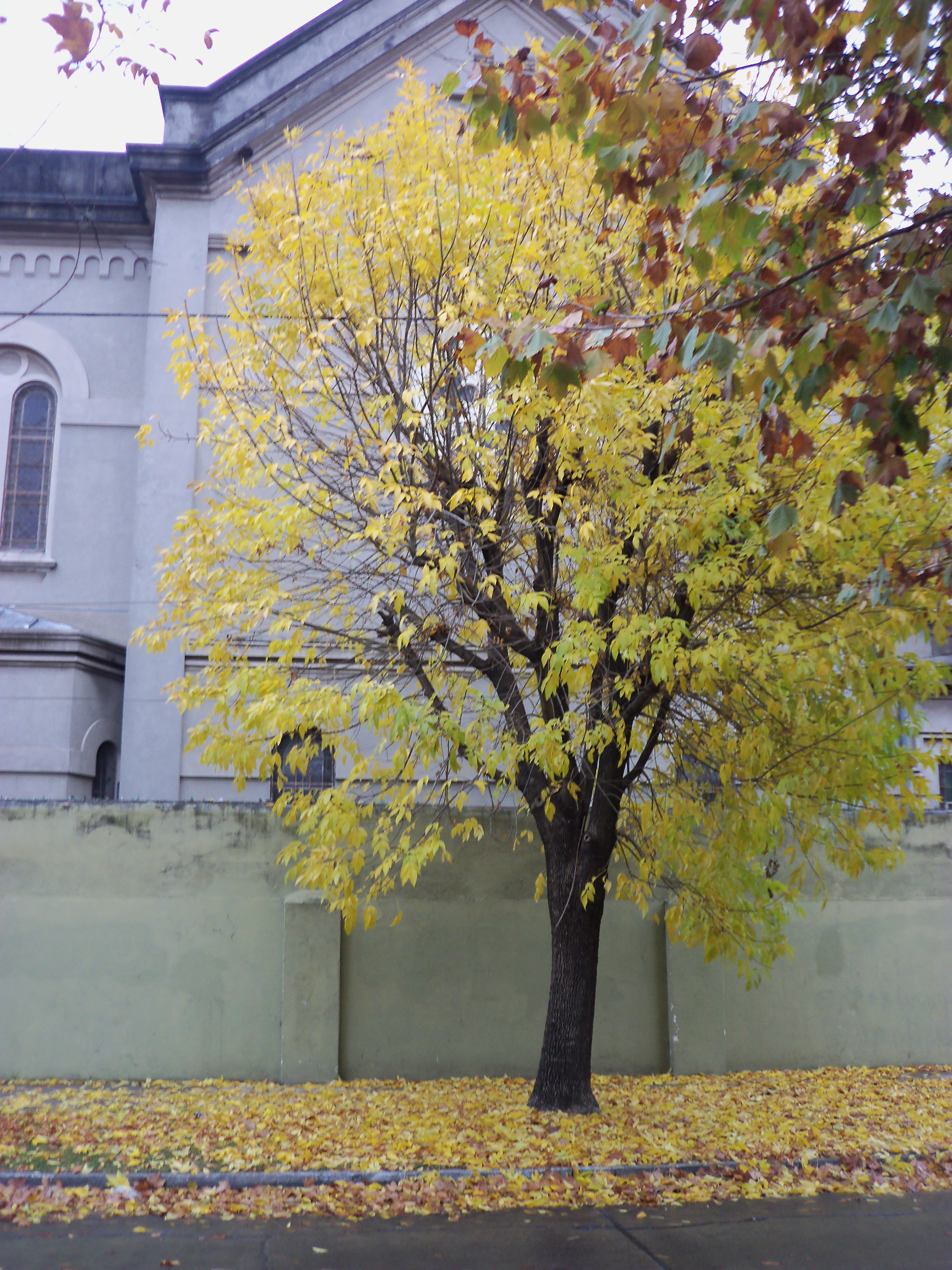
Maria Auxiliadora Church in autumn, Bernal, Buenos Aires Province

== Population ==
In 2001, Bernal had with 109,790 inhabitants (INDEC, 2001) the second largest population in the Partido of Quilmes, roughly 25% of the total partido population : 76,499 in West Bernal, 33,415 in East Bernal. These numbers imply a population growth of 15% compared with the figures of the 1991 INDEC Census which had shown a population of 111,361 inhabitants.

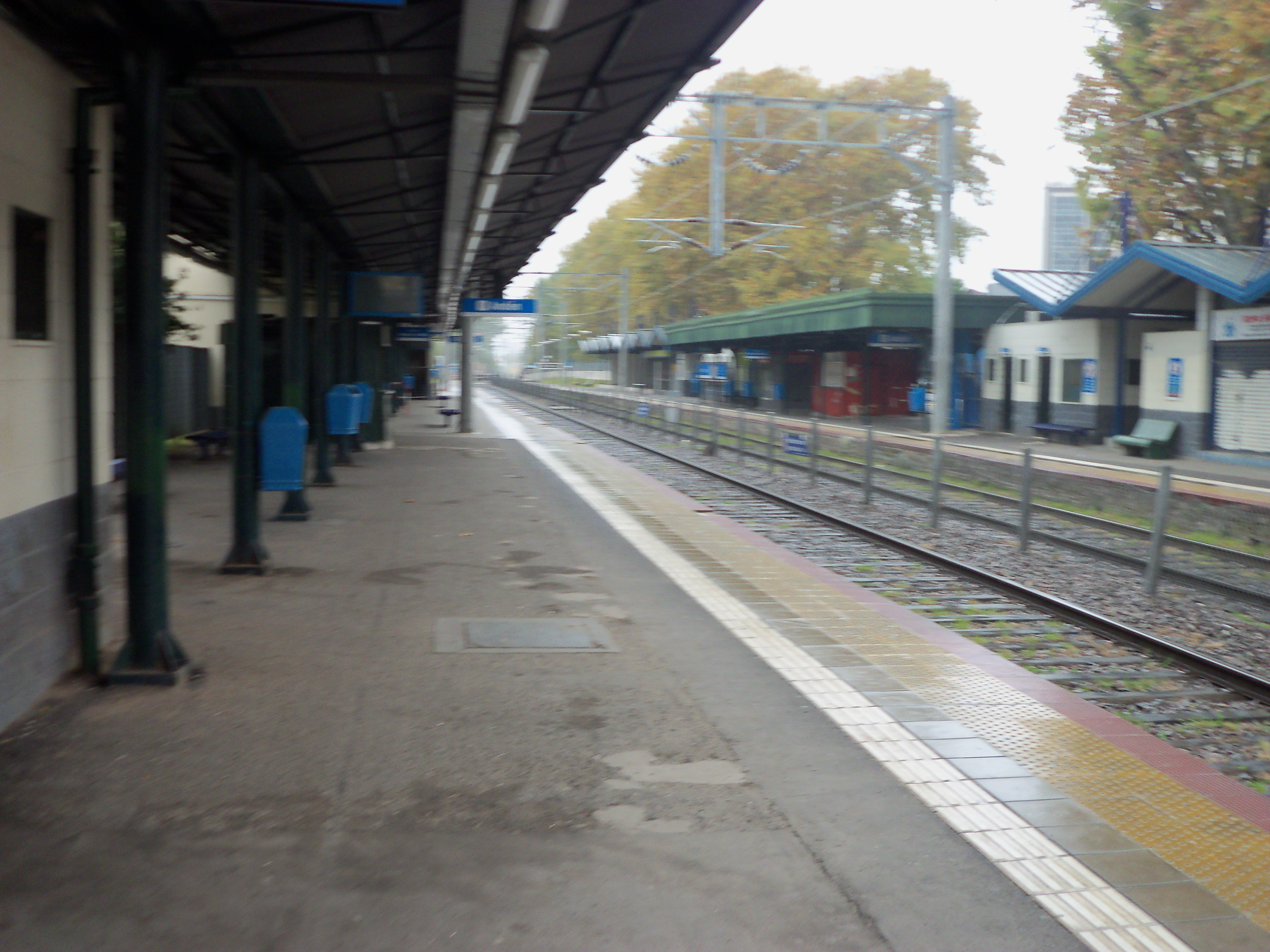
Bernal railway station

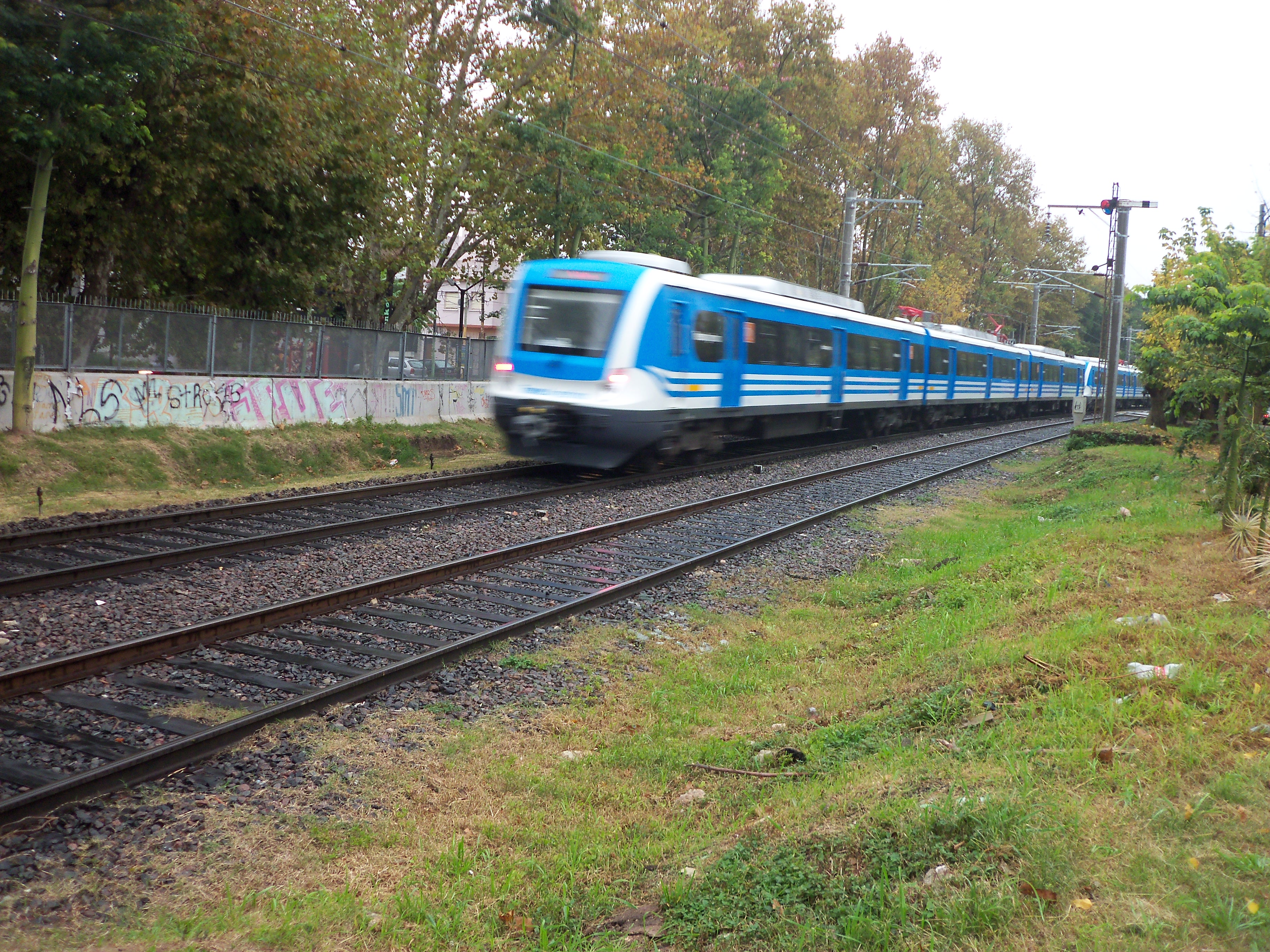
Train near Bernal station in Roca Line

== Notable people ==
- Sergio Aladio, Argentine union leader
- Diego Milito, Argentine footballer
- Lucy Patané, Argentine musician
