= Sergio Aladio =

Argentine activist

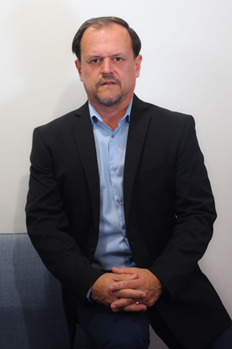
Aladio in 2023

Sergio Aladio is an Argentine union leader and activist. He is the current general secretary of the Santa Fe Truckers Union.

== Early life ==
Born in Bernal, Argentina, a suburb of Buenos Aires, Aladio relocated to Santa Fe at the age of 14 and began working in the trucking industry at 17 as an assistant to truck drivers, a role colloquially referred to as an "owl."

== Career ==
Aladio's career progressed from an entry-level position to union delegate, and eventually, he became a member of the Santa Fe Truckers Union during Marcelo Dainotto's leadership.

In April 2014, the National Federation of Truck Drivers initiated a legal battle against the Santa Fe Truckers Union. The conflict reached a significant point in 2020 when Chamber I of the National Chamber of Labor Appeals ruled in favor of an intervention against the Santa Fe Union, despite an appeal. However, following an extraordinary appeal by Aladio, the Supreme Court of Argentina overturned the decision in February 2024, effectively ending the Santa Fe Union's affiliation with the National Federation after nearly a decade of litigation.

In 2016, despite opposition from factions within the union, Aladio was elected as its head. He subsequently led the union to disaffiliate from the national federation, asserting its autonomy. This decision came amidst a broader context of political and labor disputes, including attempts by Hugo Moyano to establish a rival union in Santa Fe in 2019.

In 2020, Aladio was re-elected as the leader of the Santa Fe Truckers Union.

Aladio is known for initiating a proposal to amend Agreement 40/89, which governs automotive freight transportation, with the introduction of a severance fund specifically for Santa Fe truck drivers. The fund would be sustained by a 3 percent monthly contribution from employers, intended to accumulate interest and assist in financing severance payments.
