= Shine True =

Canadian-American reality television series

- Directed by: Michelle Mama
- Presented by: Lucas Silveira; Richie Shazam
- Countries of origin: Canada; United States
- Original language: English
- No. of seasons: 1
- No. of episodes: 9

Production
- Producer: Michelle Mama

Original release
- Network: OutTV (Canada); Fuse (United States)
- Release: March 22, 2021

Shine True is a documentary series which premiered on March 22, 2021 on OutTV in Canada, and Fuse in the United States. Originally announced in 2019 with the working title Clothes Minded, the series celebrates the trans and gender non-conforming community by helping them overcome dysphoria and anxiety. It also helps getting them to a place where they can freely and finally reveal the way they feel.

The series is co-hosted by musician, activist and life coach Lucas Silveira, and model, artist and photographer Richie Shazam.

The series is a coproduction of OutTV, Fuse Media and Vice Media.

== Cast ==
- Azul (they/them)
- Fran (they/them)
- Kain (they/he/she)
- Juan (they/them/he/him)
- Juan (they/them/he/him)
- LaDon (he/him/she/her)
- Prism (they/them)
- Ronnie (they/them)
- T (he/him/they/them)
