= Dirty King =

Studio album by The Cliks
- Released: June 23, 2009
- Genre: Alternative rock
- Label: Warner Music Canada; Tommy Boy Records United States
- Producer: Sylvia Massy

The Cliks chronology
| Snakehouse (2007) | Dirty King (2009) |

Professional ratings
Review scores
| Source | Rating |
|---|---|
| AllMusic | 3.5/5 stars |
| Dallas Voice | B+ |

Dirty King is an album by the Canadian rock band The Cliks. It was released on June 23, 2009, on Warner Music Canada and Tommy Boy Records.

== Production ==
The album was produced by Sylvia Massy.

== Critical reception ==
The Dallas Voice wrote that the album "comes off a bit over polished but the quality of songs here surpasses any critique of overproduction." Blurt called the album "killer guitar riffs, throbbing drums, and punk coolness all anchored by singer Lucas Silviera’s wickedly primal vocals." The Advocate wrote that the album "switches from snarling swagger and foot-stomping rock to beautifully harmonized ballads seamlessly, refusing to be typecast as one genre or another."

== Track listing ==
All songs written by Lucas Silveira, except for where noted.

1. "Haunted" - 4:35
2. "Dirty King" - 3:43
3. "Not Your Boy" - 4:38
4. "Red and Blue" - 4:10
5. "Henry" (Silveira, Jen Benton, Morgan Doctor) - 3:55
6. "Emily" - 2:59
7. "Career Suicide" (Silveira, Benton, Doctor) - 3:19
8. "Love Gun" - 4:05
9. "We Are the Wolverines" - 4:07
10. "Falling Overboard" - 4:08
11. "Animal Farm" - 5:28

== Personnel ==
- Lucas Silveira: vocals, guitar
- Jen Benton: bass guitar
- Morgan Doctor: drums, percussion
