= Michelle Mama =

Canadian-Parsi writer, producer, director, and filmmaker

Michelle Mama is a Canadian writer, director, producer, and LGBTQIA+ advocate known for her work in film and television. She directed the episode Fluid: Beyond the Binary for CBC's The Nature of Things and co-founded GAY AGENDA, a Toronto-based production company focused on LGBTQIA+ stories. Mama has been nominated five times for Canadian Screen Awards, including for her work on Lost Car Rescue and Shine True, and won one for Canada’s Drag Race. She has won several industry awards for her documentary and reality television productions.

Mama directed Fluid: Life Beyond the Binary (hosted by Mae Martin), a 2024 episode of CBC’s The Nature of Things that examines gender and sexual fluidity in humans and the natural world.

== Background ==
Michelle Mama was born and raised in Canada in Parsi-Zoroastrian Family. Her parents immigrated from Karachi, Pakistan, and her family traces its roots to both India and Pakistan. She identifies as queer, and is a vocal advocate for LGBTQIA+ rights and representation in the media.

== Career ==
=== Writer and director ===
Mama has worked for over two decades in various roles across the entertainment industry. As a writer, she contributed to Baroness Von Sketch Show (Season 5, IFC/CBC), a series known for its sharp humour and social commentary. She also directed the award-winning documentary 21 Days to Nawroz, a film out the struggles of women in Kurdistan in the north of war-torn Iraq

Mama also produced Your Beautiful Cul de Sac Home, a feature comedy, starring Valerie Buhagiar, Ennis Esmer, Charles Officer, and Matt Gordon.

In 2023, Mama directed Fluid: Beyond the Binary, an episode of The Nature of Things featuring non-binary comedian Mae Martin. The episode explores the complexity of gender identity, with an emphasis on queer representation in media.

In addition, she worked on the 2023 series Lost Car Rescue, earning a Canadian Screen Award nomination for Best Direction in a Factual Program.

Being tapped by the National Film Board of Canada (NFB) to direct two short films honouring laureates of the Governor General’s Performing Arts Awards for 2024.

=== Producer and showrunner ===
Mama's production credits include In The Making, a CBC Arts documentary series featuring sixteen films profiling groundbreaking Canadian artists which was nominated for several awards at the 2019 Canadian Screen Awards and Summer Qamp (executive producer),a documentary that follows LGBTQIA+ youth attending Camp fYrefly in rural Alberta for a week of queer joy and discovery. She is also the showrunner, series producer, and director for the Shine True documentary series, which received recognition for its focus on LGBTQIA+ fashion and beauty.

She served as executive producer of Canada’s Drag Race (Season 3) and Canada’s Drag Race: Canada vs. The World (Season 1).

=== Advocacy and cultural impact ===
Her work often highlights issues of identity, belonging, and culture, with a special focus on the intersection of queer narratives. This includes directing the documentary Antidiva: The Carole Pope Confessions, which delves into the life of Canadian rock icon Carole Pope.

Mama is an outspoken advocate for increased LGBTQIA+ and BIPOC representation in Canadian film and television. She has commented on the structural barriers faced by queer creators, noting:

“From the beginning of producing I’ve always believed … if it’s queer content, and you have queer people in the room, it’s better.”

She has also observed that decision-makers in Canadian broadcasting can be risk-averse, limiting authentic queer representation on screen.

Mama emphasizes the importance of preserving generational memory in queer storytelling, stating:

“We focus too much on youth and beauty in the queer community … we also lost two generations of very wonderful … men to the AIDS crisis.”

She was named in Toronto Life’s Most Influential People list for 2024.

=== Entrepreneurship and GAY AGENDA ===
In 2023, she founded GAY AGENDA, a queer-owned production company based in Toronto, focused on telling stories by, for, and about queer communities. GAY AGENDA was nominated as Top Emerging Indie by realscreen magazine.

GAY AGENDA, has multiple documentary and scripted projects in development, including an untitled documentary about queer elders for TVO and the factual series Your Grandma Loves Me, featuring comedian Brandon Ash-Mohammed.

Through Gay Agenda, Mama continues to expand her work across multiple formats, including factual, scripted, and animated projects. She also directs short films for the National Film Board of Canada, such as the 2024 Governor General’s Performing Arts Awards tributes, and is developing additional large-scale documentary features. Her current work increasingly highlights intergenerational and community-based themes, as seen in Queer Elders.,

== Views and Opinions ==
She has spoken about the importance of involving LGBTQIA+ and gender-diverse individuals in all stages of production, arguing that inclusion behind the camera leads to more truthful and resonant work. She has said that “if it’s queer content, and you have queer people in the room, it’s better,” reflecting her belief that representation must extend beyond the screen to the production process.

Mama has also critiqued the Canadian television industry’s tendency toward risk aversion, suggesting that commissioning and funding bodies often hesitate to support unconventional or unapologetically queer narratives. She advocates for greater institutional support for creators whose lived experiences reflect the stories being told.

== Awards and nominations ==
Year	Award/Festival	Category	Nominated work	Result
2007	Anchorage International Film Festival	Best Feature	Your Beautiful Cul de Sac Home	Nominated
2007	Cinéfest Sudbury	Best Canadian Film	Your Beautiful Cul de Sac Home	Nominated
2009	World Fest Houston - Platinum Remi	Best Documentary	21 Days to Nawroz Producer	Won
2009	Baghdad International Film Festival	Best International Documentary	21 Days to Nawroz Producer	Won
2009	Mexico International Film Festival - Silver Palm	Best Documentary	21 Days to Nawroz Producer	Won
2009	CINE International, Los Angeles - Golden Eagle	Best Documentary	21 Days to Nawroz Producer	Won
2009	Accolade Competition, Los Angeles	Best in Show, Documentary	21 Days to Nawroz Producer	Won
2019	Golden Sheaf Awards	Best Documentary Series	In the Making Showrunner, Series Producer, Director	Nominated
2019	Canadian Screen Awards	Best Original Music	In the Making Showrunner, Series Producer, Director	Nominated
2019	Canadian Screen Awards	Best Photography	In the Making Showrunner, Series Producer, Director	Nominated
2019	Canadian Screen Awards	Best Direction, Documentary Series	In the Making Showrunner, Series Producer, Director	Nominated
2020	Canadian Screen Awards	Best Direction, Documentary Series	In the Making Showrunner, Series Producer, Director	Nominated
2022	MIPCOM Diversity TV Excellence Award	Best LGBTQIA+ Unscripted	Shine True Showrunner, Series Producer, Director	Won
2022	Imagen Awards	Best Variety/Reality Show	Shine True Showrunner, Series Producer, Director	Won
2022	Critic's Choice Awards	Best Lifestyle: Fashion/Beauty	Shine True Showrunner, Series Producer, Director	Nominated
2022	Canadian Screen Awards	Best Direction, Factual	Shine True Showrunner, Series Producer, Director	Nominated
2023	Canadian Screen Awards	Best Direction, Factual	Lost Car Rescue Series Director	Nominated
2023	Canadian Screen Awards	Best Reality/Competition Program/ Series	Canada's Drag Race Executive Producer	Nominated
2023	Calgary International Film Festival DGC Canadian Doc Feature Award		Summer Qamp Executive Producer	Special Jury Mention
2023	People's Choice Award - TIFF '23 Audience Award		Summer Qamp Executive Producer	First Runner-Up
