= The Cliks =

Canadian rock band

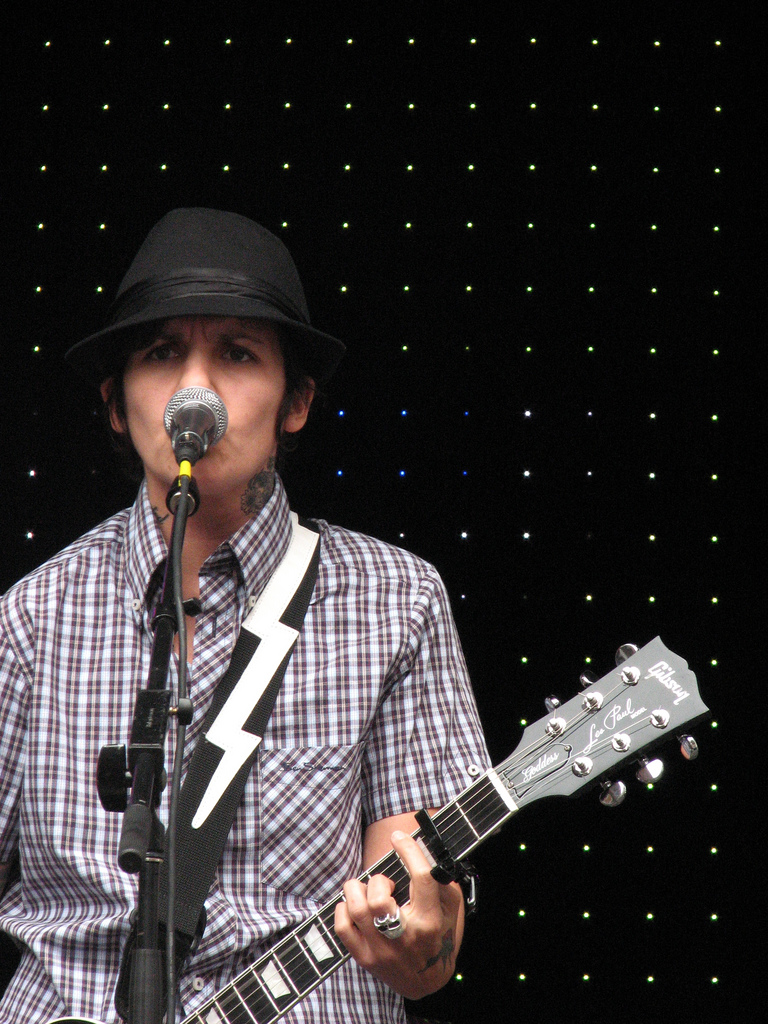
- Lucas Silveira of The Cliks at the June 2008 Pittsburgh Pridefest.

Background information
- Origin: Toronto, Ontario
- Genres: Rock, alternative rock, pop rock, indie rock, indie pop
- Instrument: Guitar/Bass/Vocals/Drums
- Years active: 2004–present
- Labels: Tommy Boy (US); Warner (Canada)
- Members: Lucas Silveira (vocals/guitar) rotating members/none permanent
- Past members: Jen Benton (bass); Morgan Doctor (drums); Jordan B. Wright; Ezri Kaysen; Heidi Chan; Nina Martinez (guitar)
- Website: http://www.thecliks.com/

The Cliks are a Canadian rock band consisting of Lucas Silveira (vocalist/guitarist), with rotating members. The Cliks' major label debut album, Snakehouse was released on April 24, 2007 by Warner Music in Canada and by Tommy Boy Records in the United States.

== History ==
In an In The Life interview, Silveira shared that the band's name derived from two ideas; using The like iconic bands The Beatles and The Rolling Stones and Cliks as a portmanteau of the slang terms clit and dicks. A different Cliks lineup, consisting of Silveira, bassist Ezri Kaysen and drummer Heidi Chan, released an eponymous debut album in 2004. In Toronto's NOW, reviewer Sarah Liss described the band's music as "what might happen if Chrissie Hynde and the Murmurs' Leisha Hailey fell in love, got Bowie to help out with insemination and gave birth to an indie rock love child."

However, the original lineup broke up in 2005. This precipitated a difficult period for lead singer and guitarist Lucas Silveira:

I was in a six-and-a-half year relationship that came to a really, really messy end. After the breakup, both of my band members quit. It was hard to take, because I was falling back on the music to take me to a place where I could keep myself going. My father had a stroke. My grandmother died. A friend of mine got rediagnosed with cancer after being cancer-free for four months. It was just one thing after another. I also started coming to terms with a lot of identity issues, being transgender and all this stuff. I had a huge breakdown and decided I was either going to get through it or I wasn't.

The first album predated Silveira's gender transition. Silveira later worked with Morgan Doctor and Jordan B. Wright to record Snakehouse. Wright left the band shortly after the album was completed and was replaced by Jen Benton on bass. Martinez was added as the second guitarist.

The breakthrough lineup of the band were all out members of the LGBT community. Silveira is a trans man, Benton and Martinez and Doctor identify as queer.

The Cliks have been compared to the likes of David Bowie and the White Stripes with the release of their first album, Snakehouse. Native to Toronto, they are the first band with a transgender leader to be signed with a major record label. The "emotional and guitar-driven" album features the single "Oh Yeah" and a cover of Justin Timberlake's "Cry Me a River".

On October 21, 2008, The Cliks announced on their MySpace blog that Nina Martinez was no longer in the group. No explanation as to why was given or that they planned on replacing her at the time being. All that was said was that they are concentrating mainly on the new album and that all is going "extremely well at the studio."

Their third LP, Dirty King, was released June 23, 2009 and the title track became a moderate hit on Canadian rock radio. The album's moderate success led the band to an opening gig for the New York Dolls on their Spring '09 North American Tour and slots on the Toronto and New Jersey Pride Festivals.

On September 1, 2009, in a message posted on The Cliks' official MySpace page, Silveria said that Morgan Doctor and Jen Benton had decided to leave the band to pursue their own ambitions. Silveira states:

"...to be blunt, the road beat us up and knocked us out. When we all woke up, we each saw a different road ahead. These things happen, it's that simple."

Although no specific information was given on why the rhythm section had decided to abandon the band, one bit of Silveria's post does hint at conflict between the band members.

Fans and bloggers have speculated the breakup to be quite acrimonious as Silveria's personal Facebook page no longer includes Doctor, Benton or Martinez as "friends."

On November 8, 2009, in a message posted on The Cliks' official MySpace page, Silveria announced that Brian Viglione and Tobi Parks (formerly of St. Louis band The Star Death) had joined the band.

That soon ended when Lucas Silveira decided to take a hiatus to begin testosterone hormone therapy which would affect his singing voice.

After successfully transitioning, Silveira later released a solo EP of cover songs and two original tracks titled "Mockingbird" 2010 (Indie) with producer Hill Kourkoutis.

The Cliks now consist of Lucas Silveira and rotating members that in the past have included primarily Hill Kourkoutis on bass (Hill and The Sky Heroes), Patrick McKeegan (AKA Patrick Von Ghostwolf) (Die Mannequin). Other musicians who have joined The Cliks also include on bass Carmen Elle (Army Girl), Jungle Tshongo (Birds of Misfortune) and on drums Jesse Labovitz (Ride The Tiger).

== Cultural impact ==
The Cliks were the first band with an open trans man as a leader signed by a major record label, Tommy Boy Entertainment. Rosie Lopez, head of A&R of Tommy Boy says that "It’s the music, not Silveira's gender that will draw in the most dedicated listeners."

Silveira understands the link the media has made with his transgender identity and the band's music, stating that he knows he is a pioneer and eventually the novelty of his gender identity will wear off. He has said that he wants to be seen first and foremost as a musician rather than an identity spokesman:

As a human being I feel a responsibility to myself to be who I am. I can't take on this, "You are the poster child for trans men or trans people" thing because people in the trans world are totally different. To me, it's just about acceptance, about things that are different, and being able to normalize that. If I can be out in the world and have people treat me like everybody else, that would be cool.

Currently, The Cliks' major exposure has been with media outlets related to the LGBTQ community, including MTV's gay-oriented Logo Network, The L Word soundtrack, and touring in 2008 with Cyndi Lauper's True Colors Tour as well as appearances at numerous Pride festivals. However, Lopez has also explained that the label is careful not to market them solely as a "transgender band":

No one is going to run out and buy this album because of that. That's the reaction audience. If we try to make this a marketing angle then that is all it is ever going to be.

== True Colors ==
During the summer of 2007, The Cliks were a part of the multi-artist True Colors Tour, which traveled through 15 cities in the United States and Canada. The tour, sponsored by the Logo channel, began on June 8, 2007. Hosted by comedian Margaret Cho and headlined by Cyndi Lauper, the tour also included Debbie Harry, The Gossip, Rufus Wainwright, The Dresden Dolls, The MisShapes, Erasure and other special guests. Profits from the tour benefited the Human Rights Campaign.

The Cliks appeared again as part of True Colors Tour 2008, along with Cyndi Lauper, The B-52's, Tegan and Sara, and other special guests.

== Discography ==
Albums

- The Cliks (2004)
- Snakehouse (2007)
- Dirty King (2009)
- Black Tie Elevator (2013)

Singles

- "Oh Yeah" (2007)
- "Eyes In the Back of My Head" (2007)
- "Complicated" (2007)
- "My Heroes (SUV)" (2008)
- "Dirty King" (2009)

== See also ==
- Music of Canada
- Canadian rock
- List of bands from Canada
- List of Canadian musicians
- Category:Canadian musical groups
