= Lucy Patané =

Argentine rock musician (b. 1985)

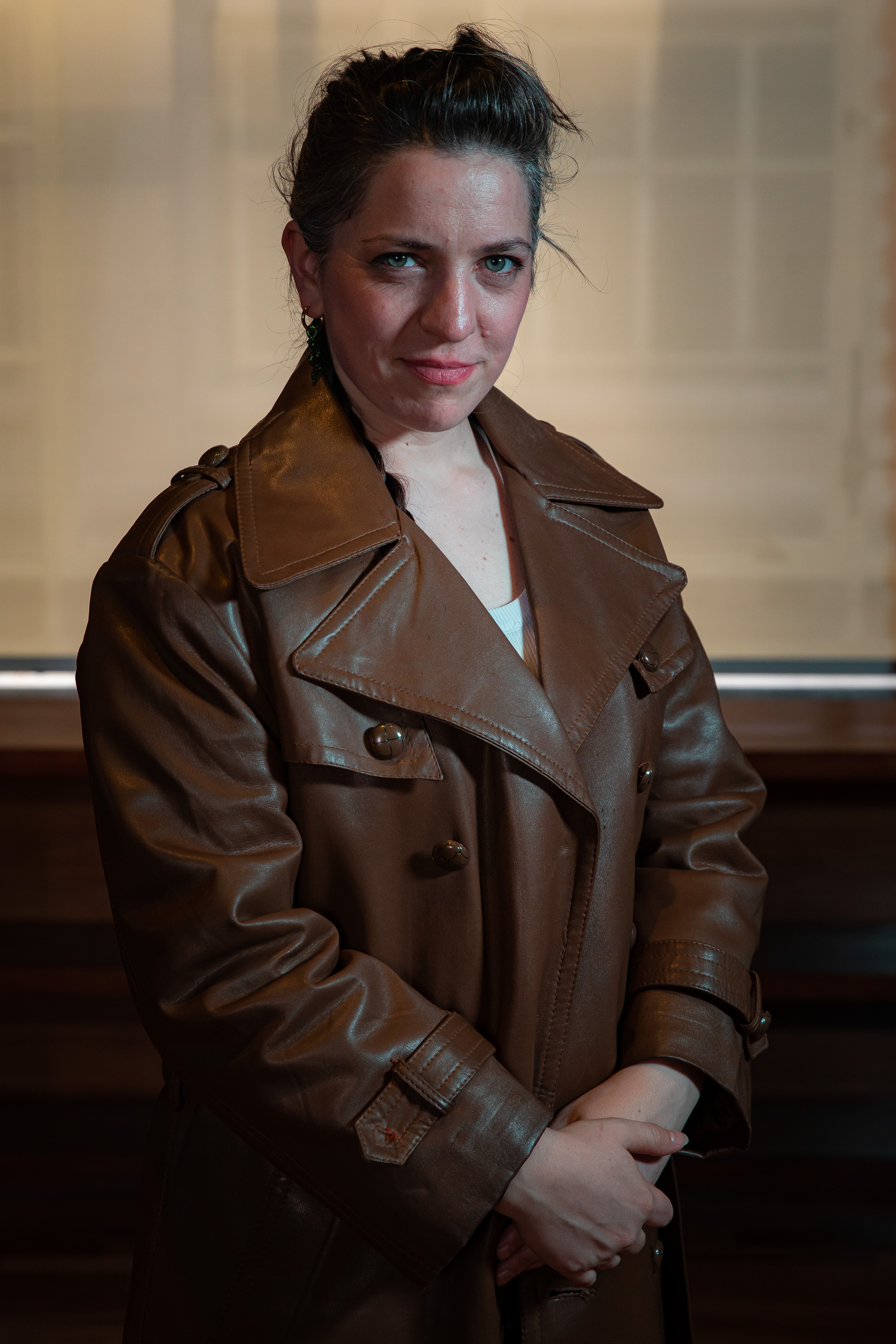

Background information
- Born: 12 June 1985 (age 40); Bernal, Argentina
- Genres: punk, rock
- Instruments: bass, drums and guitar
- Works: LUCY PATANÉ (2019), Lesbiandrama (2023), Hija de Ruta (2024)
- Formerly of: Panda Tweak, La Cosa Mostra, LasTaradas, El Tronador, Lesbiandrama
- Website: https://lucypatane.bandcamp.com/

Lucy Patané (born 12 June 1985) is an Argentine multi-instrumentalist musician, composer and producer. She has performed with bands including La Cosa Mostra, LasTaradas, El Tronador and Lesbiandrama and has also released solo albums. Her first solo album LUCY PATANÉ (2019) won Album of the Year at Premios Gardel.

== Biography ==
=== Career ===
Patané is a multi-instrumentalist musician, composer and producer. She began playing drums at age 5, bass at age 9 and the guitar at age 13. She studied at the Escuela de Música Popular de Avellaneda (EMPA) [es] then at the Escuela Tecson in Buenos Aires, where she completed part of a recording engineering degree.

Patané began her career in the hardcore-punk band Panda Tweak, playing with the band for 7 years from 2003. She has also performed in bands including La Cosa Mostra, LasTaradas and El Tronador.

Patané co-wrote and performed on the EP Lesbiandrama with Paula Maffía [es] in 2023. They lived together in La Boca.

=== Solo career ===
In 2018, Patané was invited to the Zona LAMM Laboratório de Artes Musicais para Mulheres (Laboratory of Musical Arts for Women) for a residency in Belo Horizonte, Brazil.

In 2019, Patané released her self-produced first solo album LUCY PATANÉ, which won Album of the Year at Premios Gardel.

In 2022, Patané toured for the first time in Europe, playing in Spain, France, Iceland and Portugal.

In 2024, Patané released her second solo album Hija de Ruta, which she coproduced with Juanito el Cantor and Tomi Campione.

In 2025, she received the Konex Award for her outstanding work as an artistic producer in the past ten years.

== Business ==
In 2012, Patané was a co-founder of Mercurio Disquería, a shop located in Buenos Aires which exclusively offers independent Argentine albums.
