= Lucas Silveira =

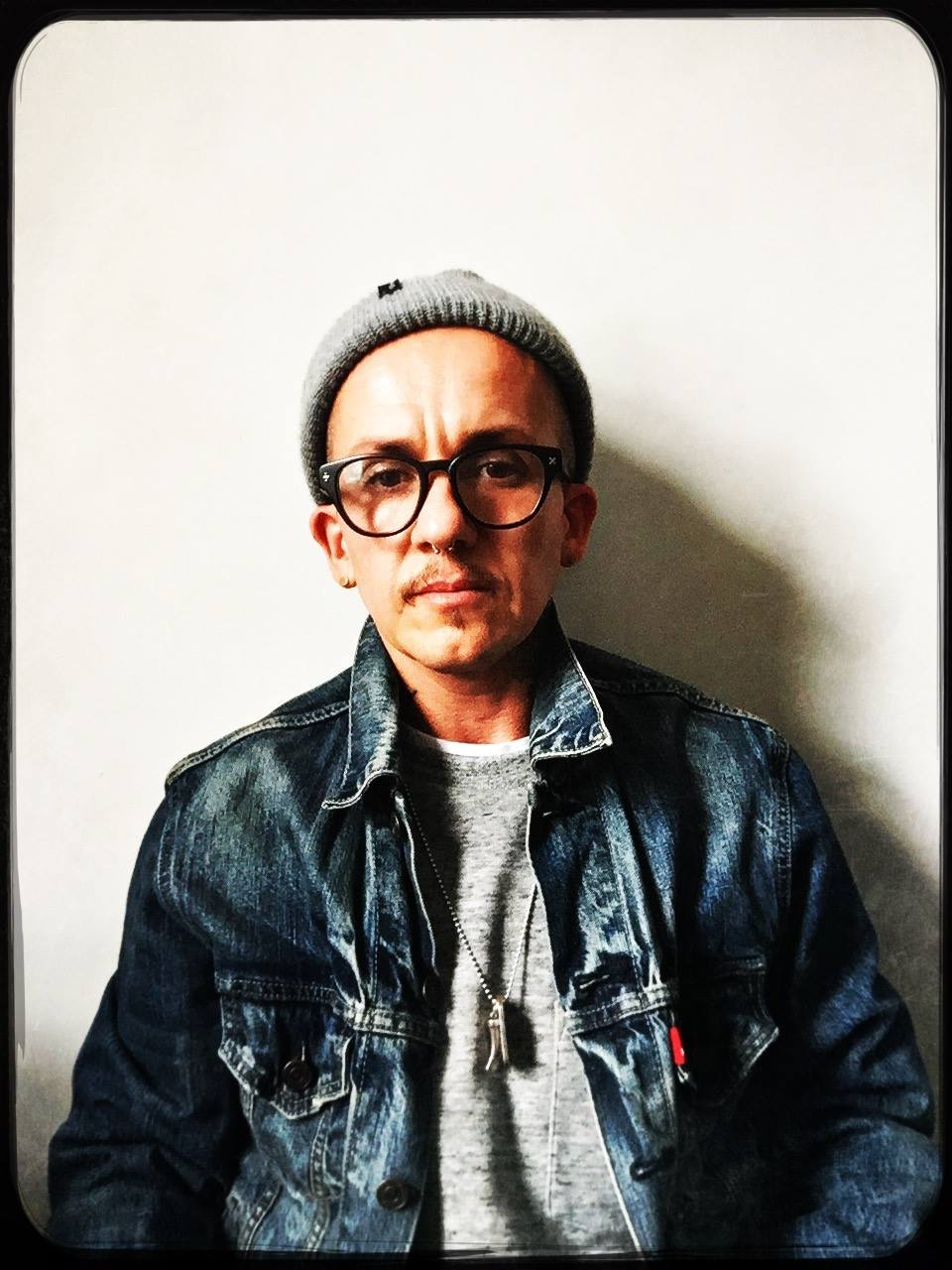
- Silveira in 2017

Background information
- Born: Toronto, Ontario, Canada
- Genres: Rock, folk
- Occupation: Singer-Songwriter
- Instruments: Vocals; Acoustic guitar
- Years active: 2007–present
- Labels: Warner Music Canada; Silver Label; Tommy Boy Entertainment
- Website: thecliks.com

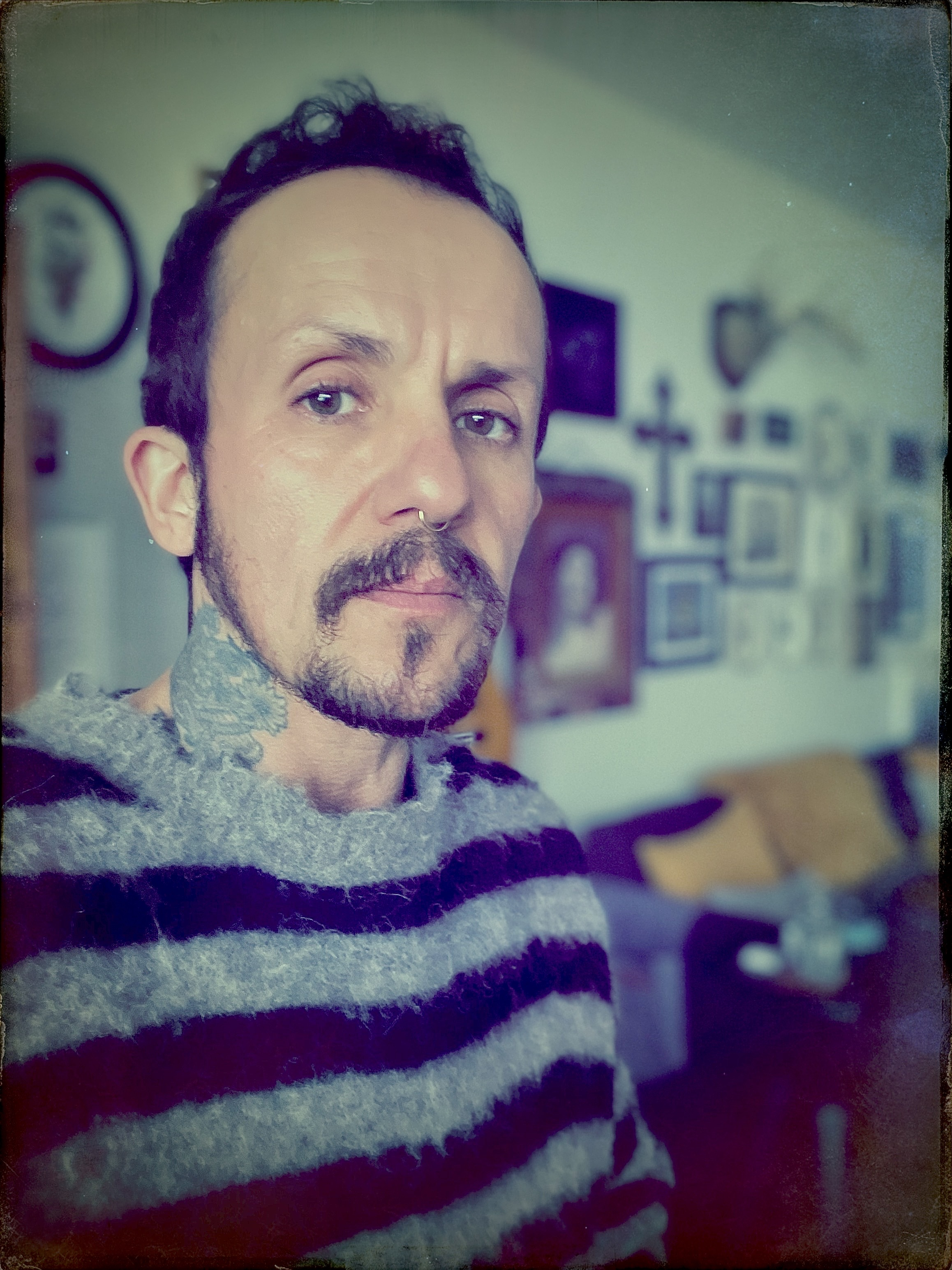
Silveira in 2023

Lucas Silveira is a Canadian vocalist, guitarist, and songwriter from Toronto, Ontario. He has composed and performed folk music and rock music, and formed and played in the band The Cliks. Silveira is credited as the first openly transgender man to have signed with a major record label. He also writes about LGBTQ issues.

== Biography ==
Silveira was born in Toronto, Canada in 1973. He has also lived in the Azores for 6 years in his youth and speaks fluent Portuguese. He is Portuguese-Canadian.

As a child, he knew that he was a boy. He cites his first memory of realizing his body did not align with his gender identity was at the age of four. Growing up, he identified as a female and as a lesbian. In 2004, he came out to himself, family, and friends as a transgender man.

He began hormone therapy in 2010.

== Career ==
Silveira started performing at the age of 18. He recorded two solo albums under his former name and before transitioning to male. Both were independently recorded and released. The first album is titled Perhaps and the second is titled Radio Friendly.

Silveira founded The Cliks in 2004 alongside Ezri Kaysen and Heidi Chan. While the lineup changed over the years, The Cliks have released four albums and with one of their songs appearing on the L Word Soundtrack and toured with Cyndi Lauper on the True Colours Tour. On their fourth album, Black Tie Elevator (2013) Silveira worked with fellow Canadian singer The Weeknd and collaborator Hill Kourkoutis. On TV Silveira appeared on MTV's Logo TV, The Late Late Show, Jimmy Kimmel Live and in the documentary film Riot Acts.

Silveira was the first openly transgender man signed to a major label record deal in 2006, at the age of 33. Before coming out as transgender, Silveira composed and performed folk music. After coming out, however, he shifted his focus to rock music. Describing his shift from folk to rock music, Silveira says, "When I finally came out as being trans, I found myself freer to explore that darker, more hard-core side, and my songwriting started getting heavier and heavier."

In 2007, The Toronto Star suggested that Silveira was about to become "the first transgendered pop heartthrob ever to register on mainstream radar”. He was also voted as the "sexiest Canadian man" in Chart Attack's 15th Annual Readers' Poll making him the first trans man to win the award.

Starting in September 2009 and ending in April 2016, Silveira began releasing popular cover songs on YouTube. Starting with Wham!'s song "Freedom" and also covered artists like Robyn, Kanye West, Lady Gaga and Justin Timberlake. When asked why he started this project, he explained that he did it for the sake of "doing a cover every like couple of weeks”. When his hormone replacement therapy began in 2010, viewers both began asking for recordings of the covers as well as asking questions about his changing voice. Silveira has not only been described as a role model for other transgender singers, but his covers on YouTube “enabled listening practices that reimagine engagement with contemporary musical archives and the temporality of trans experience.” However, upon reflecting on this early success with a major label, he was shocked that "the band quickly hit a glass ceiling" where the "main focus wasn’t on my music. It was very much on my gender identity."

In 2021, Silveira was announced as one of the hosts of the transgender-themed fashion makeover series Shine True for OutTV and Fuse. That same year, Silveira also released the solo album "The Goddamn Flowers."

== Activism ==
In 2011, he appeared with Ian Harvie and Selene Luna, in Buck Angel's documentary Sexing the Transman, investigating the sexuality of transgender men and the change in their sexual behavior after they transitioned.

Silveira has written and published articles around LGBT identity, specifically transgender identity. In May 2013, Silveira published an article with HuffPost Music Canada titled "I'm Trans, I Get Bullied, and I'm Fighting Back", where he wrote about the bullying that he endures as a transgender man and how he has fought back. In July 2015, Silveira published another article in HuffPost Living Canada titled "Why We Need to Talk About Caitlyn Jenner." He expresses support for Jenner and transgender individuals around the world, while arguing that Jenner's story is one of privilege that many do not have. He ends the article by congratulating Jenner as well as transgender man Aydian Dowling, but emphasizes trying "not to fall into the same pattern that others have before us and be mindful that there are so many amazing diverse people in our community who all need a voice to tell their stories."

In 2016, Silveira wrote two pieces for SamaritanMag. His October 2016 article titled "Filmmaker Captures Reactions of His Family and Friends in Coming Out Doc", Silveira interviews Alden Peter on his documentary Coming Out. In the article, Silveria asks Peter about his desire to come out, vulnerability, and hopes for future projects. In November 2016, Silveira published another article titled "Q&A: Film Director Adam Garnet Jones Explores Unique First Nations Theme." He interviews Adam Garnet Jones on his LGBT drama Fire Song, two-spirit identity, and homophobia within First Nations communities. Additionally, he has been interviewed by the CBC on Bill C-16 which introduced a Canadian law that added gender expression and gender identity as protected grounds to the Canadian Human Rights Act.

In April 2017, Silveira published a piece on SamaritanMag titled "Q&A: the Cliks' Lucas Silveira interviews Fellow Transgender Rock Singer Laura Jane Grace". In the article, he interviews Grace on her experience publicly coming out, transitioning, and Grace's book, Tranny: Confessions Of Punk Rock’s Most Infamous Anarchist Sell Out, and band, Against Me!.
