= List of Canadian films of 2024 =

This is a list of Canadian films slated for release in 2024:

Title	Director	Cast	Notes	Ref
1+1+1 Life, Love, Chaos (1+1+1 ou La vie, l’amour, le chaos)	Yanie Dupont-Hébert	Noémie Yelle, Victor Andrés Trelles Turgeon, Irlande Côté		
1995	Ricardo Trogi	Jean-Carl Boucher, Shadi Janho, Myriam Gaboury, Mickaël Gouin, Olivier Aubin	The fourth in Trogi's series of semi-autobiographical films about his own life, centred on his participation in La Course destination monde.	
7 Beats per Minute	Yuqi Kang			
8 Times	Adam Mbowe			
8th Street Menace	Gavin Baird, Jacob Farrell			
40 Acres	R.T. Thorne	Danielle Deadwyler, Kataem O'Connor, Jaeda LeBlanc, Michael Greyeyes		
73 Seconds	Stacy Gardner			
Ababooned (Ababouiné)	André Forcier	Éric Bruneau, Rémi Brideau, Rémy Girard, Maïla Valentir, Gaston Lepage, Lilou Roy-Lanouette, Martin Dubreuil, Pascale Montpetit, Mylène Mackay		
Aberdeen	Ryan Cooper, Eva Thomas	Gail Maurice, Billy Merasty, Jennifer Podemski, Ryan Rajendra Black		
Adrianne and the Castle	Shannon Walsh			
After Sunday	Omolola Ajao			
After the Odyssey (Au lendemain de l'odyssée)	Helen Doyle			
After the Silence (Après le silence)	Matilde-Luna Perotti			
Alazar	Beza Hailu Lemma			
Alberta Number One	Alexander Carson	Liz Peterson, Bebe Buckskin, Kris Demeanor, Benjamin Carson, Randall Okita, Shannon Steele, Ingrid Vargas		
All Stirred Up! (Tous toqués!)	Manon Briand	Édouard Baer, Julie Le Breton, Sylvain Marcel		
All the Lost Ones	Mackenzie Donaldson	Jasmine Mathews, Douglas Smith, Steven Ogg, Devon Sawa, Alexander Elliot, Vinessa Antoine, Sheila McCarthy, Lochlyn Munro		
Allen Sunshine	Harley Chamandy	Vincent Leclerc, Miles Phoenix Foley, Liam Quiring Nkindi, Catherine Souffront, Joseph Whitebird		
Among Mountains and Streams (Parmi les montagnes et les ruisseaux)	Jean-François Lesage	Ma Jian, Meng Huang		
Angela's Shadow	Jules Arita Koostachin	Sera-Lys McArthur, Matthew Kevin Anderson, Renae Morrisseau, Asivak Koostachin		
Anotc ota ickwaparin akosiin	Catherine Boivin			
Any Other Way: The Jackie Shane Story	Michael Mabbott, Lucah Rosenberg-Lee	Jackie Shane		
The Apprentice	Ali Abbasi	Sebastian Stan, Jeremy Strong, Maria Bakalova, Martin Donovan, Mark Rendall, Joe Pingue		
Arcadian	Benjamin Brewer	Nicolas Cage, Jaeden Martell, Maxwell Jenkins, Sadie Soverall, Joe Dixon		
Archeology of Light (Archéologie de la lumière)	Sylvain L’Espérance			
Archipelago of Earthen Bones — To Bunya	Malena Szlam			
Are You Scared to Be Yourself Because You Think That You Might Fail?	Bec Pecaut	Lío Mehiel, Sadie Scott, Phyllis Ellis, Francesca Dill		
Ari's Theme	Nathan Drillot, Jeff Lee Petry			
Arthur Erickson: Beauty Between the Lines	Danny Berish, Ryan Mah	Arthur Erickson		
At All Kosts (Koutkékout)	Joseph Hillel			
At the End of Nothing at All (Au boute du rien pantoute)	Jérôme Sabourin	Marcel Sabourin		
Atomic Reaction	Michèle Hozer			
Balance	Luiza Cocora			
Bam Bam: The Sister Nancy Story	Alison Duke	Sister Nancy		
The Battle of Saint-Léonard (La Bataille de Saint-Léonard)	Félix Rose			
Beaupré the Giant (Géant Beaupré)	Alain Fournier	Marcel Sabourin, Fanny Mallette		
Beethoven's Nine	Larry Weinstein			
Before They Joined Us	Arshile Khanjian Egoyan			
Being at Home (Habiter la maison)	Renée Beaulieu	François Papineau, Antoine DesRochers, Emie Thériault, Rose-Marie Perreault, Nathalie Cavezzali, France Castel, Danny Gilmore		
The Best	Ian Bawa			
Between Pictures: The Lens of Tamio Wakayama	Cindy Mochizuki			
Bibi's Dog Is Dead	Shervin Kermani	Bryn McAuley, Mishka Thébaud		
Billy	Lawrence Côté-Collins	Billy Poulin		
The Bird in My Backyard	Ryan Wilkes	Eric Pittman		
The Birds Who Fear Death	Sanjay Patel			
The Birdman of Cooper Island	Kevin McMahon, Michael McMahon	George Divoky		
Bloody Mess	Megan Wennberg			
Blue Rodeo: Lost Together	Dale Heslip	Blue Rodeo		
Blue Sky Jo (La Petite et le vieux)	Patrice Sauvé	Juliette Bharucha, Gildor Roy, Vincent-Guillaume Otis, Marilyn Castonguay		
Bonjour Tristesse	Durga Chew-Bose	Chloë Sevigny, Lily McInerny, Claes Bang		
Born to Be Wild: The Story of Steppenwolf	Oliver Schwehm			
Boxcutter	Reza Dahya	Ashton James, Zoe Lewis, Clairmont the Second		
Bulletproof: A Lesbian’s Guide to Surviving the Plot	Regan Latimer			
Can I Get a Witness?	Ann Marie Fleming	Sandra Oh, Joel Oulette, Keira Jang		
Cart Girls	Katelyn McCulloch			
Carved from Stone	Tyler Burr			
Cat's Cry (Mačji krik)	Sanja Živković	Jasmin Geljo		
The Chef and the Daruma	Mads K. Baekkevold	Hidekazu Tojo		
Cherub	Devin Shears	Benjamin Turnbull		
A Christmas Storm (Le Cyclone de Noël)	Alain Chicoine	Christine Beaulieu, Véronique Cloutier, Patrick Hivon, Catherine Souffront, Danielle Proulx, Luc Senay, Émi Chicoine		
Circo	Lamia Chraibi			
Code 8: Part II	Jeff Chan	Robbie Amell, Stephen Amell, Sirena Gulamgaus, Altair Vincent, Alex Mallari Jr., Moe Jeudy-Lamour, Aaron Abrams, Jean Yoon, Sarena Parmar, Darrin Maharaj, Kari Matchett		
Cold Meat	Sébastien Drouin	Allen Leech, Nina Bergman		
Cold Road	Kelvin Redvers	Roseanne Supernault		
Curl Power	Josephine Anderson			
Dada	Aaron Poole	James Gilbert, Ciara Alexys		
Darkest Miriam	Naomi Jaye	Britt Lower, Tom Mercier, Sook-Yin Lee, Jean Yoon		
Days Before the Death of Nicky (Jours avant la mort de Nicky)	Denis Côté	Erin Margurite Carter		
Deaner '89	Sam McGlynn	Paul Spence, Will Sasso, Kevin McDonald, Mary Walsh, Stephen McHattie		
Delta Dawn	Asia Youngman			
Detours Ahead	Esther Cheung			
Die Alone	Lowell Dean	Carrie-Anne Moss, Douglas Smith, Frank Grillo		
Disco's Revenge	Omar Majeed, Peter Mishara			
Dissolution (Se fondre)	Simon Lavoie	Jean-François Casabonne, Fayolle Jean, Louise Laprade, Pascale Bussières, Sébastien Ricard		
Do I Know You from Somewhere?	Arianna Martinez	Caroline Bell, Ian Ottis Goff, Mallory Amirault		
Don't Fuck with Ghosts	Stuart Stone, Adam Rodness			
Drive Back Home	Michael Clowater	Charlie Creed-Miles, Alan Cumming, Clare Coulter		
EarthWorm	Phillip Barker			
Emboiter leurs pas	Manuel Orhy Pirón			
Entropic Memory (Mémoire entropique)	Nicolas Brault			
Every Other Weekend	Mick Robertson, Margaret Rose			
Extras	Marc-Antoine Lemire	Isabelle Giroux, Sophie Faucher		
Eye Piece	Kate Solar			
Fairy Creek	Jen Muranetz			
Fantas	Halima Elkhatabi	Tania Doumbe Fines, Juan Mateo Barrera Gonzales, Bourriquet, Adam Hilali, Ryan Hilali		
La femme cachée	Bachir Bensaddek	Antoine Bertrand, Nailia Harzoune, Athéna Henry		
Fight Another Day	James Mark	Eric Johnson, Martin Kove, Christina Ochoa, Jim Belushi, Paul Braunstein, Matt Willig, Melanie Leishman, Elina Miyake Jackson, Ennis Esmer		
Fire Tower	Tova Krentzman			
Foyers	Zachary Ayotte	Aude Mathieu, William Coallier, Laurie Babin		
Freedom	Scott Jones			
Frankie Freako	Steven Kostanski	Conor Sweeney, Matthew Kennedy, Kristy Wordsworth, Adam Brooks		
French Girl	James A. Woods, Nicolas Wright	Zach Braff, Evelyne Brochu, Luc Picard, Vanessa Hudgins, Antoine Olivier Pilon		
A French Youth (Une jeunesse française)	Jérémie Battaglia			
Gaslit	Anna MacLean			
Gender Reveal	Mo Matton	Ayo Tsalithaba, Kě Xīn Li, Lyraël (Alex) Dauphin		
Ghosts of the Sea (Les Enfants du large)	Virginia Tangvald			
Goddess of Slide	Alfonso Maiorana	Ellen McIlwaine		
The Great Salish Heist	Darrell Dennis	Graham Greene, Ashley Callingbull, Taylor Kinequon, Craig Lauzon, Andrea Menard		
Hatch	Alireza Kazemipour, Panta Mosleh	Ali Eldurssi, Aixa Kay		
The Heirloom	Ben Petrie	Ben Petrie, Grace Glowicki		
Hello Stranger	Amélie Hardy	Cooper Josephine		
Himalia	Clara Milo, Juliette Lossky			
His Father's Son	Meelad Moaphi			
The Hobby	Simon Ennis			
Hola Frida!	André Kadi, Karine Vézina	Emma Rodriguez, Olivia Ruiz, Manuel Tadros	Canada-France coproduction	
Home Free	Avi Federgreen	Natalie Brown, Michelle Nolden, Tara Spencer-Nairn, Art Hindle		
Hotel Silence (Hôtel Silence)	Léa Pool	Sébastien Ricard, Lorena Handschin, Jules Poirier, Irène Jacob, Louise Turcot, Paul Ahmarani		
Humane	Caitlin Cronenberg	Jay Baruchel, Emily Hampshire, Peter Gallagher, Enrico Colantoni, Sebastian Chacon		
Hunt for the Oldest DNA	Niobe Thompson			
Hunting Daze (Jour de chasse)	Annick Blanc	Alexandre Landry, Bruno Marcil, Nahéma Ricci, Marc Beaupré		
Hunting Matthew Nichols	Markian Tarasiuk			
I Never Promised You a Jasmine Garden	Teyama Alkamli	Tara Hakim, Sandy El-Bitar		
I Shall Not Hate	Tal Barda	Izzeldin Abuelaish		
Ibuka, Justice	Justice Rutikara			
In a Violent Nature	Chris Nash			
Incandescence	Velcrow Ripper, Nova Ami			
Inedia	Liz Cairns	Amy Forsyth, Susanne Wuest		
Inkwo for When the Starving Return (Inkwo à la défense des vivants)	Amanda Strong			
Intercepted	Oksana Karpovych			
The Invisibles	Andrew Currie			
It's All Gonna Break	Stephen Chung	Broken Social Scene		
It's Not Funny Anymore: Vice to Proud Boys	Sébastien Trahan	Thomas Morton, Gavin McInnes		
Jude and the Jinn	Rolla Tahir			
Julian and the Wind	Connor Jessup			
Karuara, People of the River	Miguel Araoz Cartagena, Stephanie Boyd			
Kidnapping Inc.	Bruno Mourral	Jasmuel Andri, Rolaphton Mercure, Patrick Joseph, Ashley Laraque, Gessica Généus	Canada, France, Haiti coproduction	
Kryptic	Kourtney Roy			
Lakeview	Tara Thorne	Lesley Smith, Hilary Adams, Nicole Steeves		
Larry (They/Them) (Larry (iel))	Catherine Legault	Laurence Philomène		
The Last Meal (Le Dernier repas)	Maryse Legagneur	Gilbert Laumord, Marie-Evelyne Lessard, Mireille Métellus		
Last We Left Off	Connor Illsley, Jon Riera, Grayson Moore, Aidan Shipley			
Lázaro at Night (Lázaro de noche)	Nicolás Pereda	Lázaro G. Rodríguez, Luisa Pardo, Francisco Barreiro, Teresita Sánchez, Gabriel Nuncio, Clarissa Malheiros	Canadian-Mexican coproduction	
The Legacy of Cloudy Falls	Nick Butler	Grace Glowicki, Andrew Moodie, Susan Berger, Amanda Martinez		
The Light Before the Sun	Michael Greyeyes	Jamie Thomas King, Rick Roberts, Tony Nappo, Jennifer Podemski, Karen Leblanc		
Like a Spiral (Comme une spirale)	Lamia Chraibi			
The Little Ancestor (Le Petit ancêtre)	Alexa Tremblay-Francœur			
The Little Shopping Trolley (Le petit panier à roulettes)	Laurence Ly	Laura Luu, Chloé Djandji, Sandrine Bisson		
Living Together (Cohabiter)	Halima Elkhatabi			
Long Ride Home	Sean Cisterna	Caio Castro		
Longing	Savi Gabizon	Richard Gere, Diane Kruger, Suzanne Clément, Marnie McPhail, Stuart Hughes		
Look at Me	Taylor Olson	Taylor Olson, Koumbie		
Louis Riel, or Heaven Touches the Earth (Louis Riel ou Le ciel touche la terre)	Matias Meyer	Matias Meyer, Marc Antoun, Nicolas Lebrun, Julien Francoeur, Gaetano Frangella, Alina Meyer		
Lovely	Serville Poblete			
Lucky Star	Gillian McKercher	Terry Chen, Olivia Cheng, Andrew Phung		
Lucky Strikes	Darcy Waite			
Lucy Grizzli Sophie	Anne Émond	Catherine-Anne Toupin, Guillaume Cyr, Lise Roy		
Made in Ethiopia	Xinyan Yu, Max Duncan			
The Madman	Akram Adouani			
Malartic	Nicolas Paquet			
Mama (Inay)	Thea Loo			
The Man I Left Behind	Matthieu Rytz, Hubert Hayaud, Larry Towell			
Matt and Mara	Kazik Radwanski	Deragh Campbell, Matt Johnson		
Maybe Elephants (Kanskje det var elefanter)	Torill Kove			
Me, Michael & I	Nicolas Tremblay, Régis Coussot			
Measures for a Funeral	Sofia Bohdanowicz	Deragh Campbell		
Men of War	Jen Gatien, Billy Corben			
Mercenaire	Pier-Philippe Chevigny			
Mickey's Mouse Trap	Jamie Bailey	Simon Phillips, Nick Biskupek, Sophie McIntosh		
Miss Boots (Mlle Bottine)	Yan Lanouette Turgeon	Antoine Bertrand, Marguerite Laurence	Remake of Bach and Broccoli (Bach et Bottine)	
Mongrels	Jerome Yoo			
Monica's News	Pamela Gallant			
Monkey Man	Dev Patel	Dev Patel, Pitobash, Sikandar Kher, Sobhita Dhulipala		
Morningside	Ron Dias			
A Mother Apart	Laurie Townshend	Staceyann Chin		
The Mother and the Bear	Johnny Ma			
Mother Father Sister Brother Frank	Caden Douglas	Mindy Cohn, Enrico Colantoni, Melanie Leishman, Chad Connell, Sharron Matthews, Juan Chioran		
Mother Mother	K'naan Warsame	Maan Youssouf Ahmed, Elmi Rashid Elmi, Hassan Najib, Ubah Egal		
The Movie Man	Matt Finlin			
Moving Water	Kaia Singh			
My Dad's Tapes	Kurtis Watson			
My Old Ass	Megan Park	Maisy Stella, Aubrey Plaza		
nanekawâsis	Conor McNally	George Littlechild		
NiiMisSak: Sisters in Film	Jules Koostachin			
Negative Capability	Jesse Zigelstein	Jonas Chernick		
Neon Dreaming (Rêver en néon)	Marie-Claire Marcotte			
Night of the Zoopocalypse	Rodrigo Perez-Castro, Ricardo Curtis			
Night Watches Us	Stefan Verna			
Ninan Auassat: We, the Children (Ninan Auassat: Nous, les enfants)	Kim O'Bomsawin			
Nobody Wants to Talk About Jacob Appelbaum	Jamie Kastner	Jacob Appelbaum		
Nola	Aisha Evelyna, Natalie Novak Remplakowski			
Okurimono	Laurence Lévesque			
On a Sunday at Eleven	Alicia K. Harris	Zoë Peak, Amia Ogieva, Samaya Hodge, Jasmine Best, Malea Yarde		
One Day This Kid	Alexander Farah			
The Order	Justin Kurzel			
Out Come the Wolves	Adam MacDonald	Missy Peregrym, Joris Jarsky, Damon Runyan		
Out for Ice Cream (Crème à glace)	Rachel Samson			
The Painting (Le Tableau)	Michèle Lemieux			
Paying for It	Sook-Yin Lee	Dan Beirne, Emily Lê, Andrea Werhun		
Pearls	Mike Simms			
Pédalo	Stéphane E. Roy	Marc Fournier, Catherine Proulx-Lemay, Camille Felton		
perfectly a strangeness	Alison McAlpine			
Phoenixes (Phénix)	Jonathan Beaulieu-Cyr	Maxime Genois, Aksel Leblanc, Evelyne Brochu, Alexandre Landry		
Plastic People: The Hidden Crisis of Microplastics	Ben Addelman, Ziya Tong			
Please, After You	Rob Michaels			
Preface to a History	Devan Scott, Willa Harlow Ross			
Really Happy Someday	J Stevens	Breton Lalama, Khadijah Roberts-Abdullah, Xavier Lopez, Ali Garrison, Katharine King So		
Red Fever	Neil Diamond, Catherine Bainbridge			
Resident Orca	Sarah Sharkey Pearce, Simon Schneider			
Rituals Under a Scarlet Sky (Rituels sous un ciel écarlate)	Dominique Chila, Samer Najari			
Rumours	Guy Maddin, Evan Johnson, Galen Johnson	Cate Blanchett, Alicia Vikander, Charles Dance, Roy Dupuis, Denis Ménochet		
Russians at War	Anastasia Trofimova			
Scared Shitless	Vivieno Caldinelli	Steven Ogg, Daniel Doheny, Julian Richings, Mark McKinney		
Scratches of Life: The Art of Pierre Hébert (Graver l'homme: arrêt sur Pierre Hébert)	Loïc Darses	Pierre Hébert		
Seeds	Kaniehtiio Horn	Kaniehtiio Horn, Graham Greene, Meegwun Fairbrother, Peter Keleghan		
Seeing Through the Darkness (Les yeux ne font pas le regard)	Simon Plouffe			
Seguridad	Tamara Segura			
Self Driver	Michael Pierro	Nathanael Chadwick, Catt Filippov, Lauren Welchner, Reece Presley		
Send Kelp!	Blake McWilliam	Frances Ward		
Serve the Country	Fabián Velasco, Miloš Mitrović			
Sharp Corner	Jason Buxton	Ben Foster, Cobie Smulders		
Shepherds (Berger)	Sophie Deraspe	Félix-Antoine Duval, Solène Rigot, Younes Boucif, Bruno Raffaelli, Véronique Ruggia	Adaptation of the novel D'où viens-tu berger? by Mathyas Lefebure	
Shook	Amar Wala	Saamer Usmani, Bernard White, Amy Forsyth, Pamela Mala Sinha		
The Shrouds	David Cronenberg	Vincent Cassel, Diane Kruger, Guy Pearce, Sandrine Holt		
The Silent Planet	Jeffrey St. Jules	Elias Koteas, Briana Middleton		
Simon and Marianne (Simon et Marianne)	Pier-Luc Latulippe, Martin Fournier	Simon Roy, Marianne Marquis-Gravel		
Simply Johanne (Johanne, tout simplement)	Nadine Valcin	Johanne Harrelle		
Singing Back the Buffalo	Tasha Hubbard			
Sisters and Neighbors! (Nos belles-sœurs)	René Richard Cyr	Geneviève Schmidt, Guylaine Tremblay, Anne-Élisabeth Bossé, Ariane Moffatt, Debbie Lynch-White, Véronic DiCaire, Véronique Le Flaguais	Adaptation of Michel Tremblay's play Les Belles-sœurs	
Skeet	Nik Sexton	Sean Dalton, Lawrence Barry, Jay Abdo		
(S)kids	Leslie Solis, Louis Solis			
Slay	Jem Garrard	Trinity the Tuck, Heidi N Closet, Crystal Methyd, Cara Melle		
The Snip	Alain Delannoy			
So Surreal: Behind the Masks	Neil Diamond, Joanne Robertson			
Society of Clothes (Les gens dans l'armoire)	Dahee Jeong			
The Soldier's Lagoon	Pablo Álvarez-Mesa			
Solemates	James Rathbone, Mike Feswick			
Someone's Trying to Get In	Colin Nixon	Ralph Prosper		
Sons	Justin Simms			
Soul's Road	Joel Stewart	Dallas Smith, Allan Hawco, Charlie Gillespie		
Sous le soleil exactement	Noa Blanche Beschorner			
The Spoils	Jamie Kastner			
The Stand	Christopher Auchter			
Stealing Vows	Bobby Singh Brown			
A Stone's Throw	Razan AlSalah			
Sugar Rot	Becca Kozak			
Sugarcane	Julian Brave NoiseCat, Emily Kassie			
Sunburnt Unicorn	Nick Johnson	Kathleen Barr, Tabitha St. Germain, Brian Drummond, Laara Sadiq, Diana Kaarina		
Sway	Charlie Hamilton, Zachary Ramelan	Emmanuel Kabongo, Mishael Morgan, Lovell Adams-Gray, Brittany Raymond		
Sweet Angel Baby	Melanie Oates	Michaela Kurimsky, Elle-Máijá Tailfeathers, Peter Mooney		
Tea Creek	Ryan Dickie			
Tenderness	Helen Lee			
The Thawing of Ice (La fonte des glaces)	François Péloquin	Christine Beaulieu, Lothaire Bluteau, Marc Béland, Jean-Luc Kanapé		
There, There	Heather Young	Marlene Jewell, Katie Mattatall		
These Wild Cats (Des chats sauvages)	Steve Patry			
Things Behind the Sun	Giran Findlay Liu			
This Too Shall Pass	Rob Grant			
A Thousand Cuts	Jake Horowitz	Jonas Chernick, Storm Steenson, David Hewlett, Julian Richings, Varun Saranga, Tommie-Amber Pirie		
To the Moon	Kevin Hartford	Jacob Sampson, Phoebe Rex, Amy Groening		
An Unfinished Journey	Aeyliya Husain, Amie Williams	Homaira Ayubi, Zefnoon Safai, Nargis Nehan, Nilofar Moradi		
Universal Language (Une langue universelle)	Matthew Rankin	Rojina Esmaeili, Saba Vahedyousefi, Pirouz Nemati, Mani Soleymanlou, Danielle Fichaud		
Unusually Normal	Colette Johnson-Vosberg			
Up the River with Acid	Harald Hutter			
Us, Our Pets and the War	Anton Ptushkin			
Vampire Zombies... from Space!	Michael Stasko			
Vile & Miserable (Vil et Misérable)	Jean-François Leblanc	Fabien Cloutier, Pier-Luc Funk, Anne-Élisabeth Bossé, Alexis Martin, Éric Robidoux, Chantal Fontaine		
Village Keeper	Karen Chapman	Oluniké Adeliyi, Maxine Simpson, Zahra Bentham, Micah Mensah-Jatoe		
Waiting for Casimir (En attendant Casimir)	Christian Mathieu Fournier			
Wake Up	François Simard, Anouk Whissell, Yoann-Karl Whissell			
We Forgot to Break Up	Karen Knox	Lane Webber, Daniel Gravelle, June Laporte, Jordan Dawson, Hallea Jones		
welima’q	shalan joudry			
What Comes Next	Alex Caulfield	Alison Thornton, Mena Suvari, Aaron Ashmore, Maya Chariandy, Stephen Lobo		
What Good Canadians Do	Stephanie Joline			
Where My Branches Stem	Teresa Kuo			
Who by Fire (Comme le feu)	Philippe Lesage	Noah Parker, Aurélia Arandi-Longpré, Antoine Marchand-Gagnon, Arieh Worthalter, Paul Ahmarani		
Who Do I Belong To (Mé el Aïn)	Meryam Joobeur	Salha Nasraoui, Mohamed Grayaâ, Malek Mechergui		
Who Loves the Sun	Arshia Shakiba			
Wild Flowers (Les Fleurs sauvages)	Rodolphe Saint-Gelais, Thierry Sirois			
Wilfred Buck	Lisa Jackson	Wilfred Buck		
Winter Spring Summer or Fall	Tiffany Paulsen	Jenna Ortega, Percy Hynes White, Marisol Nichols, Adam Rodriguez, Jacqueline Emerson		
The Wolf (Le Loup)	Theodore Ushev			
Words Left Unspoken	Josiane Blanc	Joze Piranian		
Yintah	Jennifer Wickham, Brenda Michell, Michael Toledano			
You Are Not Alone (Vous n'êtes pas seul)	Marie-Hélène Viens, Philippe Lupien	Pier-Luc Funk, Marianne Fortier, François Papineau, Sandrine Bisson, Blaise Tardif, Micheline Lanctôt		
Young Werther	José Lourenço			
Your Higher Self (Le Plein potentiel)	Annie St-Pierre			
Your Tomorrow	Ali Weinstein			

[top]

== See also ==
- 2024 in Canadian television
- 2024 in film
