= 2024 Vancouver International Film Festival =

2024 Canadian film festival

- Opening film: Ari's Theme by Nathan Drillot and Jeff Lee Petry
- Closing film: Emilia Pérez by Jacques Audiard
- Location: Vancouver, British Columbia, Canada
- Founded: 1958
- Festival date: September 26 - October 6, 2024
- Website: VIFF

Vancouver International Film Festival
- 44th 42nd

The 2024 Vancouver International Film Festival, the 43rd event in the history of the Vancouver International Film Festival, was held from September 26 to October 6, 2024. The first five films in the program were announced on August 8, 2024, with the full program released on August 28.

The festival opened with the documentary film Ari's Theme, and closed with the film Emilia Pérez. Overall, the festival screened 150 feature films and 81 shorts.

== Awards ==
Juried award winners were announced on October 3, 2024, with audience award winners announced on October 17.

Award	Film	Filmmaker
Audience Award, Galas & Special Presentations	I'm Still Here (Ainda Estou Aqui)	Walter Salles
Audience Award, Showcase	No Other Land	Yuval Abraham, Basel Adra, Hamdan Ballal, Rachel Szor
Audience Award, Panorama	Angela's Shadow	Jules Arita Koostachin
Audience Award, Vanguard	Red Path (Les Enfants rouges)	Lotfi Achour
Audience Award, Northern Lights	The Stand	Christopher Auchter
Audience Award, Insights	The Chef and the Daruma	Mads K. Baekkevold
Audience Award, Spectrum	Grand Theft Hamlet	Pinny Grylls, Sam Crane
Audience Award, Portraits	Luther: Never Too Much	Dawn Porter
Audience Award, Altered States	40 Acres	R. T. Thorne
Best Canadian Film	Universal Language	Matthew Rankin
Best Canadian Documentary	Ninan Auassat: We, the Children	Kim O'Bomsawin
Best Canadian Documentary, Honorable Mention	Mama (Inay)	Thea Loo
Best Short Film	Strawberry Shortcake	Deborah Devyn Chuang
Best Short Film, Honorable Mention	Judas Icarus Twists His Wrist	Kerr Holden
Emerging Canadian Director	Mongrels	Jerome Yoo
Emerging Canadian Director, Honorable Mention	Cat's Cry (Mačji krik)	Sanja Živković
Best BC Film	Mama (Inay)	Thea Loo
Best BC Film, Honorable Mention	The Stand	Christopher Auchter
Vanguard Award	78 Days (78 dana)	Emilija Gašić
Vanguard Award, Honorable Mention	Hanami	Denise Fernandes

== Films ==
=== Galas and special presentations ===
English title	Original title	Director(s)	Production country
All We Imagine as Light		Payal Kapadia	France, India, Netherlands, Luxembourg
Anora		Sean Baker	United States
Ari's Theme		Nathan Drillot, Jeff Lee Petry	Canada
Bird		Andrea Arnold	United Kingdom
Can I Get a Witness?		Ann Marie Fleming	Canada
Conclave		Edward Berger	United States, United Kingdom
Emilia Pérez		Jacques Audiard	France
The End		Joshua Oppenheimer	Denmark, United Kingdom
The Girl with the Needle	Pigen med nålen	Magnus von Horn	Denmark, Poland, Sweden
I'm Still Here	Ainda Estou Aqui	Walter Salles	Brazil, France
My Favourite Cake	Keyk-e mahboob-e man	Maryam Moqadam, Behtash Sanaeeha	Iran, France, Sweden, Germany
Nightbitch		Marielle Heller	United States
The Piano Lesson		Malcolm Washington	United States
Rumours		Guy Maddin, Evan Johnson, Galen Johnson	Canada, Germany
The Seed of the Sacred Fig		Mohammad Rasoulof	Iran, France, Germany
The Tragically Hip: No Dress Rehearsal		Mike Downie	Canada

=== Showcase ===
English title	Original title	Director(s)	Production country
Black Dog	狗阵	Guan Hu	China
Blue Sun Palace		Constance Tsang	United States
Caught by the Tides	风流一代	Jia Zhangke	China
Dahomey		Mati Diop	France, Senegal, Benin
A Different Man		Aaron Schimberg	United States
Dying	Sterben	Matthias Glasner	Germany
Flow	Straume	Gints Zilbalodis	Latvia, France, Belgium
Gloria!		Margherita Vicario	Italy, Switzerland
Grand Tour		Miguel Gomes	Portugal, Italy, France, Germany, Japan, China
Happyend		Neo Sora	Japan, United States
Matt and Mara		Kazik Radwanski	Canada
No Other Land		Yuval Abraham, Basel Adra, Hamdan Ballal, Rachel Szor	Palestine, Norway
Paying for It		Sook-Yin Lee	Canada
Secret Mall Apartment		Jeremy Workman	United States
Sharp Corner		Jason Buxton	Canada, Ireland
Shepherds	Berger	Sophie Deraspe	Canada
Soundtrack to a Coup d'Etat		Johan Grimonprez	Belgium, France, Netherlands
A Traveler's Needs	Yeohaengjaui pilyo	Hong Sang-soo	South Korea
Universal Language	Une langue universelle	Matthew Rankin	Canada

=== Panorama ===
English title	Original title	Director(s)	Production country
Angela's Shadow		Jules Arita Koostachin	Canada
Armand		Halfdan Ullmann Tøndel	Norway, Netherlands, Germany, Sweden
Black Tea		Abderrahmane Sissako	France, Mauritania, Luxembourg, Taiwan, Ivory Coast
Brief History of a Family	家庭简史	Lin Jianjie	China, France, Denmark, Qatar
Carnival Is Over	Os Enforcados	Fernando Coimbra	Brazil, Portugal
Christmas Eve in Miller's Point		Tyler Taormina	United States
Eephus		Carson Lund	France, United States
Fly Me to the Moon		Greg Berlanti	United States
Ghost Trail	Les Fantômes	Jonathan Millet	France, Germany, Belgium
Hakki		Hikmet Kerem Özcan	Turkey
Holy Cow	Vingt dieux!	Louise Courvoisier	France
House of the Seasons	Jangson	Oh Jung-min	South Korea
Julie Keeps Quiet		Leonardo van Dijl	Belgium, Sweden
Living in Two Worlds	Bokuga Ikiteru, Futatsu no Sekai	Mipo O	Japan
Love Lies	我談的那場戀愛	Ho Miu Ki	Hong Kong
Marco, the Invented Truth	Marco, la verdad inventada	Aitor Arregi, Jon Garaño	Spain
Measures for a Funeral		Sofia Bohdanowicz	Canada
Misericordia	Miséricorde	Alain Guiraudie	France, Spain, Portugal
Most People Die on Sundays	Los domingos mueren más personas	Iair Said	Argentina, Italy, Spain
The Mother and the Bear		Johnny Ma	Canada, Chile
My Late Summer	Nakon ljeta	Danis Tanović	Croatia, Bosnia and Herzegovina, Romania, Slovenia, Serbia
The New Year That Never Came	Anul Nou care n-a fost	Bogdan Mureşanu	Romania
On Becoming a Guinea Fowl		Rungano Nyoni	Zambia, United Kingdom, Ireland
Pierce	Cì xīn qiè gŭ	Nelicia Low	Singapore, Taiwan, Poland
Reinas		Klaudia Reynicke	Switzerland, Peru
Rosinante		Baran Gündüzalp	Turkey
Samia		Yasemin Şamdereli	Italy, Germany, Belgium
Sex		Dag Johan Haugerud	Norway
Sleeping with a Tiger	Mit einem Tiger schlafen	Anja Salomonowitz	Austria
Solids by the Seashore	ทะเลของฉัน มีคลื่นเล็กน้อยถึงปานกลาง	Patiparn Boontarig	Thailand
Souleymane's Story	L'histoire de Souleymane	Boris Lojkine	France
The Sparrow in the Chimney	Der Spatz im Kamin	Ramon Zürcher	Switzerland
Super Happy Forever		Kohei Igarashi	Japan, France
To a Land Unknown		Mahdi Fleifel	United Kingdom, France, Germany, Netherlands, Greece, Qatar, Saudi Arabia, Palestine
Under the Volcano	Pod wulkanem	Damian Kocur	Poland
When We Lost to the Germans	Toen we van de Duitsers verloren	Guido van Driel	Netherlands
Who by Fire	Comme le feu	Philippe Lesage	Canada

=== Vanguard ===
English title	Original title	Director(s)	Production country
78 Days	78 dana	Emilija Gašić	Serbia
Familiar Touch		Sarah Friedland	United States
Hanami		Denise Fernandes	Switzerland, Portugal, Cape Verde
I Saw Three Black Lights	Yo vi tres luces negras	Santiago Lozano Álvarez	Colombia, Mexico, France, Germany
Me, Maryam, the Children and 26 Others	Man, Maryam, Bacheha va 26 Nafare Digar	Farshad Hashemi	Iran, Germany
Red Path	Les Enfants rouges	Lotfi Achour	Tunisia, France, Belgium, Poland
Shambhala		Min Bahadur Bham	Nepal, France, Norway, Turkey, Hong Kong, Taiwan, United States. Qatar
Toxic	Akiplėša	Saulė Bliuvaitė	Lithuania

=== Northern Lights ===
English title	Original title	Director(s)	Production country
7 Beats per Minute		Yuqi Kang	Canada
Bonjour Tristesse		Durga Chew-Bose	Canada, Germany
Cat's Cry	Mačji krik	Sanja Živković	Canada, Serbia, Croatia
Cherub		Devin Shears	Canada
The Heirloom		Ben Petrie	Canada
Inedia		Liz Cairns	Canada
Living Together	Cohabiter	Halima Elkhatabi	Canada
Lucky Star		Gillian McKercher	Canada
Mama	Inay	Thea Loo	Canada
Mongrels		Jerome Yoo	Canada
Preface to a History		Devan Scott, Willa Harlow Ross	Canada
Seeds		Kaniehtiio Horn	Canada
Shook		Amar Wala	Canada
The Stand		Christopher Auchter	Canada
There, There		Heather Young	Canada
Village Keeper		Karen Chapman	Canada

=== Insights ===
English title	Original title	Director(s)	Production country
At Averroès & Rosa Parks	Averroès & Rosa Parks	Nicolas Philibert	France
Balomania		Sissel Dargis Morell	Denmark, Spain
Blink		Edmund Stenson, Daniel Roher	United States, Canada
The Chef and the Daruma		Mads K. Baekkevold	Canada
Curl Power		Josephine Anderson	Canada
Democracy Noir		Connie Field	United States, Denmark
Fish War		Jeff Ostenson, Charles Atkinson, Skylar Wagner	United States
Living with Wolves	Vivre avec les loups	Jean-Michel Bertrand	France
Ninan Auassat: We, the Children	Ninan Auassat: Nous, les enfants	Kim O'Bomsawin	Canada
Searching for Amani		Nicole Gormley, Debra Aroko	United States, Kenya
The Thinking Game		Greg Kohs	United States
Unlikely Allies		Anthony Pedone	United States

=== Spectrum ===
English title	Original title	Director(s)	Production country
Apple Cider Vinegar		Sofie Benoot	Belgium, Netherlands
Grand Theft Hamlet		Pinny Grylls, Sam Crane	United Kingdom
The In Between		Robie Flores	United States
It's Not Me	C'est pas moi	Leos Carax	France
Listen to the Voices	Kouté Vwa	Maxime Jean-Baptiste	Guyana, Belgium, France
Pepe		Nelson Carlo de los Santos Arias	Dominican Republic, Germany, France, Namibia
Real		Adele Tulli	Italy, France
Realm of Satan		Scott Cummings	United States
smiles and kisses you		Bryan Carberry	United States
The Universe in a Grain of Sand		Mark A. Levinson	United States

=== Portraits ===
English title	Original title	Director(s)	Production country
Disco's Revenge		Omar Majeed, Peter Mishara	Canada
Draw Me Egypt: Doaa El-Adl, a Stroke of Freedom		Nada Riyadh	Belgium, France, Luxembourg
Googoosh: Made of Fire		Niloufar Taghizadeh	Germany
John Singer Sargent: Fashion and Swagger		David Bickerstaff	United Kingdom
Luther: Never Too Much		Dawn Porter	United States
Modernism, Inc.		Jason Cohn	United States
Pol Pot Dancing		Enrique Sánchez Lansch	Germany, Norway
So Surreal: Behind the Masks		Neil Diamond, Joanne Robertson	Canada
A Stranger Quest		Andrea Gatopoulos	Italy, United States, Canada
A Sudden Glimpse to Deeper Things		Mark Cousins	United Kingdom
Uncropped		D.W. Young	United States
Viva Niki: The Spirit of Niki de Saint Phalle	タロット・ガーデンへの道	Michiko Matsumoto	Japan

=== Leading Lights ===
Guest curator: Zarrar Kahn.

English title	Original title	Director(s)	Production country
The Big City	Mahanagar	Satyajit Ray	India
Hyenas	Hyènes	Djibril Diop Mambéty	Senegal
Investigation of a Citizen Above Suspicion	Indagine su un cittadino al di sopra di ogni sospetto	Elio Petri	Italy
Marlina the Murderer in Four Acts	Marlina Si Pembunuh dalam Empat Babak	Mouly Surya	Indonesia

=== Focus: Once, There Is a City ===
Guest curators: Kika Memeh, Ogheneofegor Obuwoma.

English title	Original title	Director(s)	Production country
Coconut Head Generation		Alain Kassanda	France, Nigeria
Eyimofe		Arie Esiri, Chuko Esiri	Nigeria
Félicité		Alain Gomis	Senegal
Ouaga Girls		Theresa Traore Dahlberg	Sweden, Burkina Faso, France, Qatar
Rafiki		Wanuri Kahiu	Kenya
Tooth for Tooth	Dent pour dent	Ottis Ba	Senegal, Belgium, France, Rwanda

=== Altered States ===
English title	Original title	Director(s)	Production country
40 Acres		R. T. Thorne	Canada
Dream Team		Lev Kalman, Whitney Horn	United States
Else		Thibault Emin	France, Belgium
Fréwaka		Aislinn Clarke	Ireland
Presence		Steven Soderbergh	United States
Párvulos	Párvulos: Hijos Del Apocalipsis	Isaac Ezban	Mexico
Rita		Jayro Bustamante	Guatemala
Rock Bottom		María Trénor	Spain, Poland
She Loved Blossoms More		Yannis Veslemes	Greece, France
Timestalker		Alice Lowe	United Kingdom

=== Short Forum ===
English title	Original title	Director(s)	Province
Almost the Dust	Casi el polvo	Léa Soler	Mexico
Beeps		Kirk Johnson	United States
The Boys and the Donkey	少年与驴	Tsering Yangjyab	China
Bright White Light		Henna Välkky, Eesu Lehtola	Finland
Candle	Chandelle	Jérémi Roy	Canada
Chuff Chuff Chuff	轟隆轟隆轟隆	Chao Koi Wang	Taiwan
Colors Under the Streetlights		Yoshimi Joya	Japan
Creatures of Light	Criaturas de la Luz	Sylvie Weber	Mexico
Culture Shock		Barry Bilinsky	Canada
Dadá	Dependências	Luisa Arraes	Brazil
Dark Matter		Leo Berkeley	Australia
Darker		Matazi Weathers	United States
The Death of James		Sam Chou	Canada
Dokra Keu Bojhey Na		Sneha Das, Monjima Mullick	India
Delta Dawn		Asia Youngman	Canada
Discoteque		Masashi Yamamoto	United States
The Egg	Dzun	Vahan Grigoryan	Armenia
The Everlasting Pea		Su Rynard	Canada
Explosions Near the Museum	Vybukhy bilia muzeiu	Roman Khimei, Yarema Malashchuk	Ukraine
Fishmonger		Neil Ferron	United States
Gate 3 to 14	مدخل ٣ إلى ١٤	Karen Abou Jaoudeh	Lebanon
Grizzly Bear Country		Mave Ky	Canada
Get Thee on the Dance Floor	님과 함께 디스코	Hyun Hahn	South Korea
Hatch		Alireza Kazemipour, Panta Mosleh	Canada
If the Sun Drowned Into an Ocean of Clouds	Et si le soleil plongeait dans l’océan des nues	Wissam Charaf	France, Lebanon
Inkwo for When the Starving Return	Inkwo à la défense des vivants	Amanda Strong	Canada
Jane's in the Freezer		Caleb Joye	United States
Judas Icarus Twists His Wrist		Kerr Holden	Canada
Judy's Garden		Evie Metz	United States
Julian and the Wind		Connor Jessup	Canada
Like a Spiral	Comme une spirale	Lamia Chraibi	Canada
Losing Your Home	Juste un toit	Emmanuel Rioux	Canada
Magic Candies	Amedama	Daisuke Nishio	Japan
Mermaids	Sirènes	Sarah Malléon	Martinique
Minus Plus Multiply		Chu-Chieh Lee	United Kingdom
Morî		Yakup Tekintangaç	Turkey
The Moving Garden	O Jardim Em Movimento	Inês Lima	Portugal
My Dog Is Dead	私の犬が死んだ	Tasuku Matsunaga, Takehiro Senda	Japan
The Mysterious Adventures of Claude Conseil	Les Mystérieuses Aventures de Claude Conseil	Marie-Lola Terver, Paul Jousselin	France
Nemo 1		Albéric Aurtenèche	Canada
Nietzschean Suicide	Khokoushten ba Shewazi Nietzsche	Payam Kurdistani	Iran
On Plains of Larger River & Woodlands		Miguel de Jesus	Australia, Portugal
One Day This Kid		Alexander Farah	Canada
Organza's Revenge		Walter Scott	Canada
The Painting	Le Tableau	Michèle Lemieux	Canada
Palestine Islands		Nour Ben Salem, Julien Menanteau	France, Jordan
Pena's Special Handling	Penan Erikoiskuljetus	Anssi Kasitonni	Finland
Retracing Their Steps	Emboîter leurs pas	Manuel Orhy Piron	Canada
The Return	Enchukunoto	Laissa Malih	Kenya
Salem on the Road	Salem sur la route	Étienne Galloy	Canada
Save My Soul		Kam Fai Leung	Hong Kong
Sauna Day	Sannapäiv	Anna Hints	Estonia
Shadow		Kamell Allaway	United States
Shoes and Hooves	Cipők és paták	Viktória Traub	Hungary
Soap Box	Boîte à savon	Jimmy G. Pettigrew	Canada
Strawberry Shortcake	草莓蛋糕	Deborah Devyn Chuang	Taiwan
Stuffed		Louise Labrousse	France
The Sweater		Maziyar Khatam	Canada
Tayal Forest Club	男孩奇幻夜	Laha Mebow	Taiwan
Three Birds	Tri ticice	Zarja Menart	Slovenia, Croatia
Time Space Love		Marie-Louise Gariépy	Canada
Time to Dilate	확장기	Kim Nayoung	South Korea
Uncommon Ground		Faith Sparrow-Crawford	Canada
We Deserve an Empire	Merecemos Un Imperio	Mauricio Maldonado	Colombia
When the Wind Rises	Xia Feng Chu	Hung Chen	Taiwan
The Widow's Son Turns Storyteller	Hasratein Basrat	Shiker Pal	India
You Can't Get What You Want But You Can Get Me		Samira Elagoz, Z Walsh	Netherlands, Finland
Zanatany, When Soulless Shrouds Whisper	Zanatany, L’empreinte des linceuls esseulés	Hachimiya Ahamada	Belgium, France, Qatar
Zoe		Rémi St-Michel	Canada

=== Modes ===
English title	Original title	Director(s)	Production country
The Cavalry		Alina Orlov	Canada, Israel, United States
The Diary of a Sky		Lawrence Abu Hamdan	Lebanon
Dreams Like Paper Boats		Samuel Suffren	Haiti
Flowers		José Cardoso	Ecuador, South Africa
Freak		Claire Barnett	United States
Grandmamauntsistercat		Zuza Banasinska	Poland
Man Number Four		Miranda Pennell	United Kingdom
Razeh-del		Maryam Tafakory	Iran, United Kingdom, Italy
She Stays		Marinthia Gutiérrez	Mexico
We Were No Desert		Agustina Comedi, Chiachio & Giannone	Argentina
