= WaaPaKe =

2023 Canadian documentary film

- Directed by: Jules Arita Koostachin
- Written by: Jules Arita Koostachin
- Produced by: Teri Snelgrove
- Cinematography: Michael Bourquin
- Edited by: Jessica Dymond
- Music by: Justin Delorme
- Production company: National Film Board of Canada
- Release date: October 1, 2023 (VIFF)
- Running time: 80 minutes
- Country: Canada
- Language: English

WaaPaKe ("Tomorrow") is a Canadian documentary film, directed by Jules Arita Koostachin and released in 2023. The film explores the intergenerational impacts that the Canadian Indian residential school system has continued to have on generations of indigenous people who were not themselves students in the system, but have still been deeply scarred by it because of its effects on their parents and grandparents.

The film is based in part on Koostachin's own family story, featuring testimony by Koostachin herself, her mother Rita and her son Asivak, about the lingering effects of the residential school system on their family life, and is dedicated to the memory of her brother Steven; however, it also includes interviews with other people who have been impacted by the legacy of residential schools, including other children of survivors and social workers who work with them to confront and heal trauma.

The film premiered in the Insights program at the 2023 Vancouver International Film Festival.

== Awards ==
It was a nominee for the Allan King Award for Best Documentary Film at the 2023 Directors Guild of Canada awards, and won the award for Best British Columbia Film at VIFF.
