= Inay =

Inay may refer to:

- the Tagalog-language word for mother,
- Inay, a 1993 Philippine film,
- Inay, a 2017 Philippine film directed by Jose Javier Reyes,
- Mama (also known as Inay), a 2024 Canadian film,
- Mike Inay, a Filipino martial artist.
