= Live-in caregiver =

Person providing care in a home setting

A professional live-in caregiver provides personal care and assistance to individuals, including those suffering from chronic illness, Alzheimer's disease, and dementia, within the home setting. Typical duties of a live-in caregiver include meal planning and preparation, assistance with grooming, dressing and toileting, medication management, laundry and light housekeeping, and transportation/escorts to doctor's appointments or social engagements. Professional live-in caregivers are often provided by an outside agency, which may also coordinate their services with the client's preferred in-home health agency and other medical providers.

== Caregiving in the home ==
A recent survey suggested that nearly 90% of Americans over the age of 65 would prefer to remain at home as they age. As the population of the United States grows older, the demand for home health aides and professional live-in caregivers is expected to rise more than 40% by 2026. Informal caregivers include any unpaid individual, such as a spouse, neighbor, or adult child, who provides personal assistance to an elderly, ill, or disabled person in the home. Formal caregivers, including professional live-in caregivers, are paid for their services. These individuals may have received certification as nurses aides, home health assistants, or personal care assistants; however, in many states, live-in caregivers are not required to have any specialized training or education.

== Services ==
Basic Principles of Caregiving: Like all forms of caregiving, professional live-in care is provided with respect for the dignity of the individual in need of care. Communication with the client, as well as their primary physician, other health care providers, and family members, is key to ensuring that the individual receiving care is able to participate, to the greatest extent possible, in decisions about their health and other matters affecting their daily life.

Depending on the level of service being provided, a professional live-in caregiver may assist the client with personal hygiene, laundry, and light housekeeping. The live-caregiver can also help coordinate the client's personal agenda, including scheduling, transportation, and escorts to medical appointments and social engagements.

Client Monitoring: Because of the one-on-one nature of live-in care, the professional caregiver is in the best position to monitor the client for changes in breathing and inform their doctor of any potential warning signs.

Live-in caregivers may monitor the client's body temperature, blood pressure, and blood glucose, as recommended by their physician. They will also remain alert for changes in the client's mental status, including signs of depression or dementia.

Social and Companion Care: Professional live-in caregivers can also provide social and companion care for elderly people who live alone.

In doing so, they seek to improve their client's quality of life by facilitating opportunities for social interaction, and helping them to maintain friendships, continue hobbies, and engage in physical exercise as recommended by their healthcare provider.

Assistance with Meal Planning and Preparation: Live-in caregivers can ensure their clients maintain a healthy diet by assisting with meal planning and preparation, monitoring body weight, and arranging for pleasant mealtimes. In some situations, professional live-in caregivers will even provide assisted feeding to those who have difficulty swallowing or otherwise eating on their own due to certain medical conditions, such as a recent stroke or Parkinson's disease.

Medication Management: Elderly people and those coping with chronic illness often have complicated medication regimens, with many taking multiple prescription and over-the-counter drugs. Each medication will require a specific dose; some may need to be taken at certain times of the day or night, with or without food; and others may induce drowsiness or other side effects.

A live-in caregiver can ensure medications are taken correctly, refilled as needed, and monitor the client for signs of adverse reactions. It is important that the client's healthcare provider educate caregivers about their medication needs to optimize long-term management at home.

Ensuring a Safe Home: It is the responsibility of live-in caregivers to ensure their client is safe at home. This includes inspecting the floor for trip and fall hazards and eliminating or mitigating any that do exist. The caregiver will also see that the thermostat is set to a comfortable and healthy temperature, and make sure that the bathroom is outfitted with fixtures and knobs the client can use, as well as grab bars and other aids that will ensure the client's safety. The live-in caregiver should also periodically check all smoke and carbon monoxide detectors in the home, so they remain in good working order.

== Training and screening ==
Throughout the United States, any home health agency that accepts Medicare must employ certified home health aides who've undergone a minimum 75 hours of training, including 16 hours of on-the-job instruction. Individual states may also impose additional screening and training requirements on live-in care agencies that accept Medicare. Private live-in care agencies that do not accept Medicare are not subject to any federal or state screening requirements. However, reputable agencies will implement their own screening programs, including requirements for criminal background checks and personality assessments.

== Live-in care vs assisted living ==
Assisted living facilities provide personal care assistance to people who need some daily help, but don't require the level of skilled care found in nursing homes. These settings may serve as few as 25 residents, while others can house in excess of 120 people. Many assisted living facilities also offer varying levels of care, including dementia and Alzheimer's care.

Residents of assisted living are usually provided with an apartment or private room, and share common areas, such as dining rooms and rec rooms. While assisted living arrangements vary by state, most facilities offer meals, medication management, personal care assistance, and opportunities for social interaction. Some may even provide transportation to doctor's appointments and opportunities for shopping and other off-site excursions.

Living-in caregivers can provide all of the services found in assisted living, but in the client's own home, eliminating the need for a potentially traumatizing move. Live-In care also allows for constant one-one-one interaction between client and caregiver, as the patient is the only individual receiving care. By comparison, the average assisted living staff provides only about 2 hours and 19 minutes of total direct care and 14 minutes of licensed nursing care per resident per day.

Live-in caregivers can provide other benefits like in-home cooked meals, medication monitoring, transportation, social interaction, and other valuable benefits.

Assisted living can also be fairly expensive. Depending on the state, base rates, which cover at least two meals per day, housekeeping, some personal care assistance, and either a one-bedroom apartment or private room with private bath, averaged nearly $3,500 per month. Among all long-term care options, assisted living has seen the greatest cost increases, rising an average of 6.7% between 2017 and 2018.

== Live-in caregivers vs family caregivers ==
It's estimated that 4.2 million Americans have provided unpaid care to an adult age 50 or older in the last 12 months. The value of services provided by informal caregivers has steadily increased over the last decade, with an estimated economic value of $470 billion in 2013, up from $450 billion in 2009 and $375 billion in 2007. Family caregivers spend an average of 24.4 hours per week providing care, while nearly 1 in 4 caregivers spends 41 hours or more per week providing care.

Caregiving can present significant financial burdens for families. For example, more than 60% of family caregivers recently reported that they had cut back on work hours, taken a leave of absence, or made other career changes because of their responsibilities. Half were late to work or had to leave early, and 1 in 5 reported that caregiving had resulted in financial strain. Family caregivers are also more likely to have depression and anxiety, use psychoactive medications, have worse self-reported physical health, experience compromised immune function, and die prematurely.

The extreme stress experienced by many family caregivers is also considered one of the leading risk factors for elder abuse.

In addition to daily care, professional live-in caregivers can be engaged for a few hours a day, or for several days a week, so family members may work part-time, run errands, attend to their own personal needs, or simply relax. Live-in care can also be arranged whenever family caregivers take a vacation or otherwise need to be away from home overnight.

== Benefits of live-in care ==
Professional live-in caregivers allow their clients to avoid moving to a nursing home, assisted living, or other long-term care facility. This benefits the client by:

- Freeing them from strict schedules and regimens imposed by many long-term care facilities.
- Allowing the client to retain as much independence as possible.
- Ensuring family and friends may visit whenever they like.
- Enabling the client to find comfort in familiar surroundings and happy memories.
- Ensuring they can retain cherished possessions, pets, or hobbies.
- Allowing the client to continue personal habits and favorite routines.
- Providing a healthier environment, with less risk of exposure to contagious illnesses that are often present in a clinical setting.

In general, elderly people who are able to remain at home exhibit improved levels of cognition, better daily functioning, decreased levels of depression, and lower rates of incontinence compared to nursing home patients.

== By country ==
=== Canada ===
The Live-In Caregiver Program (LCP, French: Programme des aides familiaux résidants) was an immigration program offered and administered by the government of Canada and was the primary means by which foreign caregivers could come to Canada as eldercare, special needs, and childcare providers. The program ended on November 30, 2014, and a regular work permit has been needed since then.
