= Nina Kiri =

Serbian-Canadian actress

- Kiri in 2026
- Born: Nina Kiridžija; September 3, 1992 (age 34); Belgrade, Serbia, FR Yugoslavia
- Occupation: Actress
- Years active: 2011–present

Nina Kiridžija (Serbian Cyrillic: Нина Кириџиjа), known as Nina Kiri (Serbian Cyrillic: Нина Кири), is a Serbian-Canadian actress, best known for playing Alma in the Hulu series The Handmaid's Tale (2017–2025).

== Early life ==
Kiri was born as Nina Kiridžija in Belgrade, Serbia in what was then the Federal Republic of Yugoslavia, during the Yugoslav Wars. Her family moved to Vancouver, Canada, where she first started performing in school theatre, then professionally on stage starting in 2007.

== Career ==
Kiri's first screen role was a short appearance in the 2011 Disney Channel television movie Geek Charming. In 2016, Kiri teamed up with fellow Serbian-Canadian Sanja Živković, who directed Kiri in the short film Cleo. Kiri had starring roles in a trio of horror films: Let Her Out (2016), The Haunted House on Kirby Road (2016) and The Heretics (2017). Kiri's performance in The Heretics earned her the Festival Prize for Best Actress at the Buffalo Dreams Fantastic Film Festival.

Kiri gained prominence in 2017 playing the handmaid Alma in the television series The Handmaid's Tale. First introduced in the series’ opening episode as Ofrobert, she's a character who assists June in connecting with the resistance. Alma is killed by a train during an escape attempt from Gilead, but she's later seen in flashbacks throughout seasons 5 and 6. Following this, she starred as Evy in the psychological horror film Undertone (2025), an A24 production that screened at the 2026 Sundance Film Festival.

== Filmography ==
=== Film ===
Year	Title	Role	Notes	Ref.
2016	Let Her Out	Molly		
2016	The Haunted House on Kirby Road	Jordan		
2016	Super Detention	Andrasta		
2017	The Heretics	Gloria		
2019	Easy Land	Nina		
2020	Love in Harmony Valley	Tracey		
2023	Fingernails	Liane		
2023	Escalation	Det. Michelle Tasbar		
2025	Out Standing	Sandra Perron		
2025	Undertone	Evy		
2026	Sanctuary	Sky		

=== Television ===
Year	Title	Role	Notes	Ref.
2017-2025	The Handmaid's Tale	Alma / Ofrobert	Recurring role (seasons 1-4), 26 episodes; Guest (season 5-6), 2 episodes	
2025	Devil in Disguise: John Wayne Gacy	Mary Amirante		

== Awards and nominations ==
Year	Award	Category	Work	Result	Ref.
2017	Buffalo Dreams Fantastic Film Festival	Best Actress	The Heretics	Won	
2018	New Jersey WebFest / NYC Web Fest	Outstanding Achievement in Writing	Blood (shared)	Nominated	
2019	Screen Actors Guild Awards	Outstanding Performance by an Ensemble in a Drama Series	The Handmaid’s Tale	Nominated	
2020	Screen Actors Guild Awards	Outstanding Performance by an Ensemble in a Drama Series	The Handmaid’s Tale	Nominated	
2026	Canadian Screen Awards	Best Lead Performance in a Drama Film	Out Standing	Nominated	
2026	ACTRA Toronto Awards	Outstanding Performance, Female	Out Standing	Won	
