= Women migrant workers from developing countries =

Women migrant workers from developing countries engage in paid employment in countries where they are not citizens. While women have traditionally been considered companions to their husbands in the migratory process, most adult migrant women today are employed in their own right. In 2017, of the 168 million migrant workers, over 68 million were women. The increase in proportion of women migrant workers since the early twentieth century is often referred to as the "feminization of migration".

Most women migrant workers come from developing countries to high-income countries, with significant impacts on both their countries of origin and destination countries. Women migrant workers send upwards of $300 billion in remittances to their countries of origin each year, often using this money to pay for their families’ basic health, housing and education needs. On a macroeconomic level, remittances from emigrant workers can account for up to 25% of national gross domestic product, and help these developing countries cope with trade deficits and external debts. However, women migrant workers have to leave their countries of origin to provide financially, and are often separated from their own families. This has led to an uneven distribution of reproductive labor globally: in destination countries, immigrant women help address the care worker shortage, and enable more local women to enter the workforce. On the other hand, in countries of origin, the emigration of large numbers of women forces other members of the community to shoulder greater domestic work burdens.

Women migrant workers typically pursue gendered professions such as domestic work and disproportionately work in private homes. As a result, they are comparatively “hidden” from society and are more vulnerable to exploitation and abuse. A variety of governmental policies, moreover, have also increased the vulnerability of these women migrant workers to abuse. For example, in the Arab states, migrant domestic workers depend on their employers for legal status, causing the workers to tolerate a significant amount of abuse for fear of deportation. Several countries also prohibit women migrant workers from having sex or becoming pregnant.

== Statistics ==
Of the 271 million international migrants today, 130 million – or nearly half – are women. The share of women migrants increased from 46.7% in 1960 to 48.4% in 2010, but has declined slightly over the past two decades, from 49.1% in 2000 to 47.9% in 2019. Amongst migrant workers, men also outnumber their women counterparts. According to the International Labor Organization, only 68.1 million – or 41.6% – of the 164 million migrant workers in 2017 were women.

Although migration between developing countries is generally more substantial than migration from developing to high-income countries, the World Bank estimates that there are almost 73 million migrants from developing countries living in high-income OECD countries. Women outnumber men amongst immigrants in developed countries, accounting for 50.9% of all immigrants in developed countries. However, in developing countries, women only account for 45.7% of all immigrants, compared to 54.3% for men.

== Women migrant workers by region ==
=== Arab states ===
5.3% of all women migrant workers reside in the Arab states. Even though 40.8% of all workers in the Arab states are migrant workers, only 20% of these migrant workers are women. Cultural and legal institutions in the region, such as the Kafala system and a lack of labor laws, have caused large proportions of these women migrant workers to be exploited and abused.

The labor laws in most Gulf states do not cover women migrant domestic workers. As a result, these women migrant workers face harsh working conditions and are vulnerable to abuse. An International Labor Organization study of four Arab countries (Bahrain, Kuwait, Lebanon and the United Arab Emirates) found that women migrant domestic workers worked an average of 101 to 108 hours per week. Many of the women interviewed also complained of sleep deprivation as they were “on-call” all day and night. The majority of women migrant domestic workers in Kuwait were subject to physical, sexual or verbal abuse. Women migrant workers in Lebanon also reported being locked in their employers’ homes and having their food intake restricted.

Many Arab states also use the Kafala system, where each woman migrant worker has to be sponsored by a resident. Women migrant workers pay large amounts of money to agencies that help them find sponsors, which is deducted from theirs first salaries. As a result, they receive no income for their first three months’ work and depend entirely on their employers for their basic needs. In addition, as a woman migrant worker's legal status is tied to her employer's sponsorship, she often tolerates significant amounts of abuse for fear of deportation.

=== Europe and North America ===
Women international migrants outnumber male migrants in both Europe and North America. 39.8% and 25.8% of women migrant workers reside in Europe and North America respectively, compared to only 26.3% and 21.1% of male migrants. The total number of immigrants has also continually increased in both regions due to an increased demand for care work amongst dual income families. For example, Beneria, a feminist economist, argues that the demand for care work in Europe in the 1990s and 2000s brought young Latinas to countries like Spain, in order to provide care work for the aging population.

=== China ===
The number of rural migrant workers in China increased eightfold from 20 to 30 million in the mid-1980s to upwards of 160 million in 2012. Of these 160 million workers, 33-50% are women. Gaetano, an American cultural anthropologist, argues that rural women's motivations to migrate are numerous and complex. Some women are driven by the allure of modern cities, and others by filial responsibility. Studies show that poor Chinese workers are more likely to migrate, and that migration increases per capita household income by 8.5 to 13.1%. Rural migrants remit a large proportion of their incomes to their families.

In order to find employment in China's bigger cities, such as Shanghai, rural migrant women rely on guanxi, social networks that enable them to connect with family or other villagers who have already left for the city. Rural migrant women pursue a wide variety of jobs, from domestic to factory work, owning their own businesses to working as hostesses in China's popular karaoke bars.

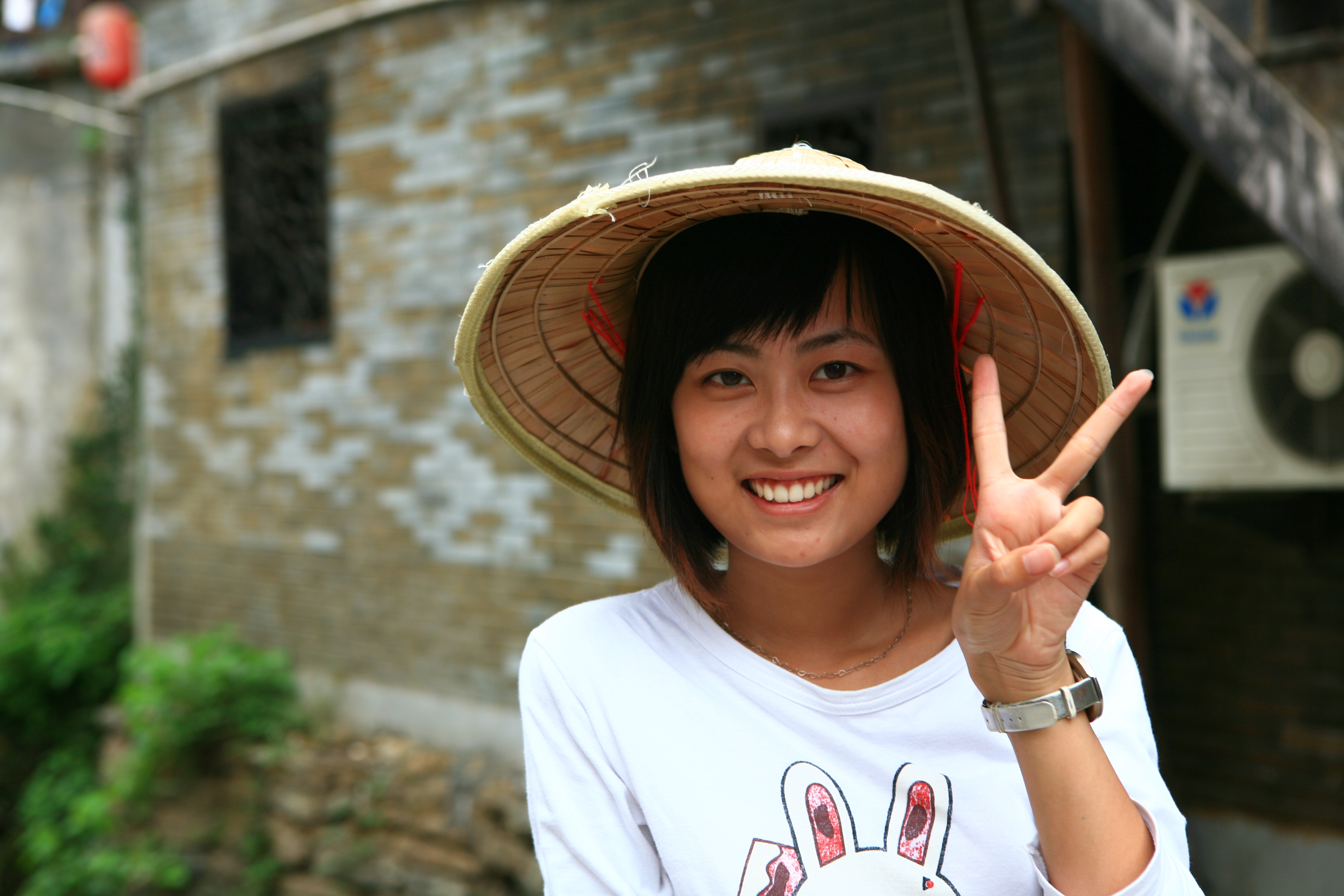
A woman from one of China's rural areas

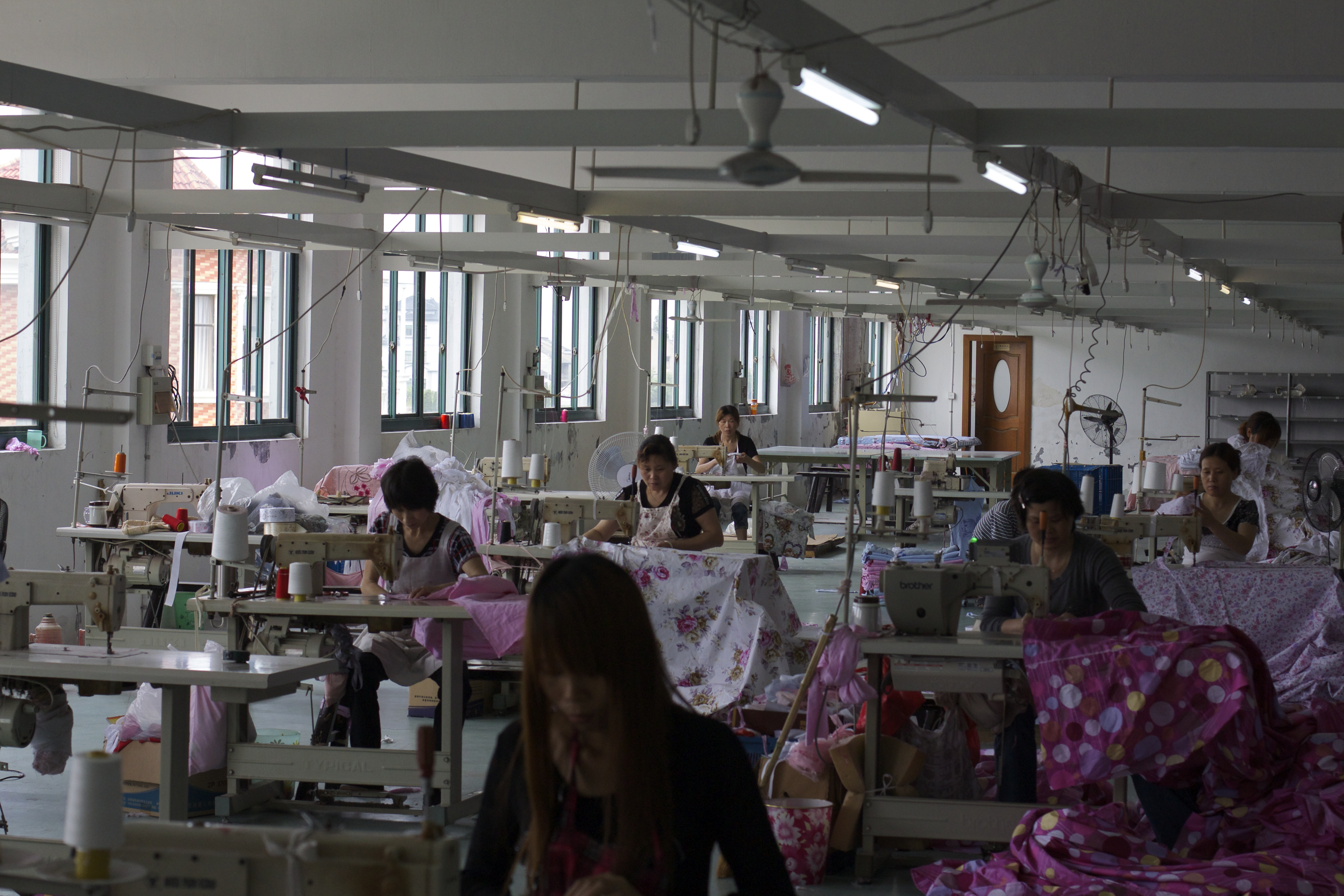
Women working in a silk factory in China

Many young Chinese women from rural areas are sent to work at factories in China's cities, where they face poor working conditions, strict regulations, low wages, and non-payments of their salaries. As Chinese laws mandate that factories must provide their women migrant workers with food and shelter, these women workers become entirely dependent on their employers for their basic needs. Employers are able to control almost every aspect of their workers’ lives, and can therefore force their employees to work late or penalize them for poor performance. In addition, Ngai, a sociologist, argues that the dormitory system is stressful for these migrant women as it removes them from their families. While this system has provided China with cheap labor to compete globally in manufacturing, it has come at the expense of isolation, maltreatment, long work hours and low wages for the women migrant workers who work in these factories. The documentary China Blue provides insight into the treatment of these young Chinese women and the conditions under which they live.

=== Southeast Asia ===
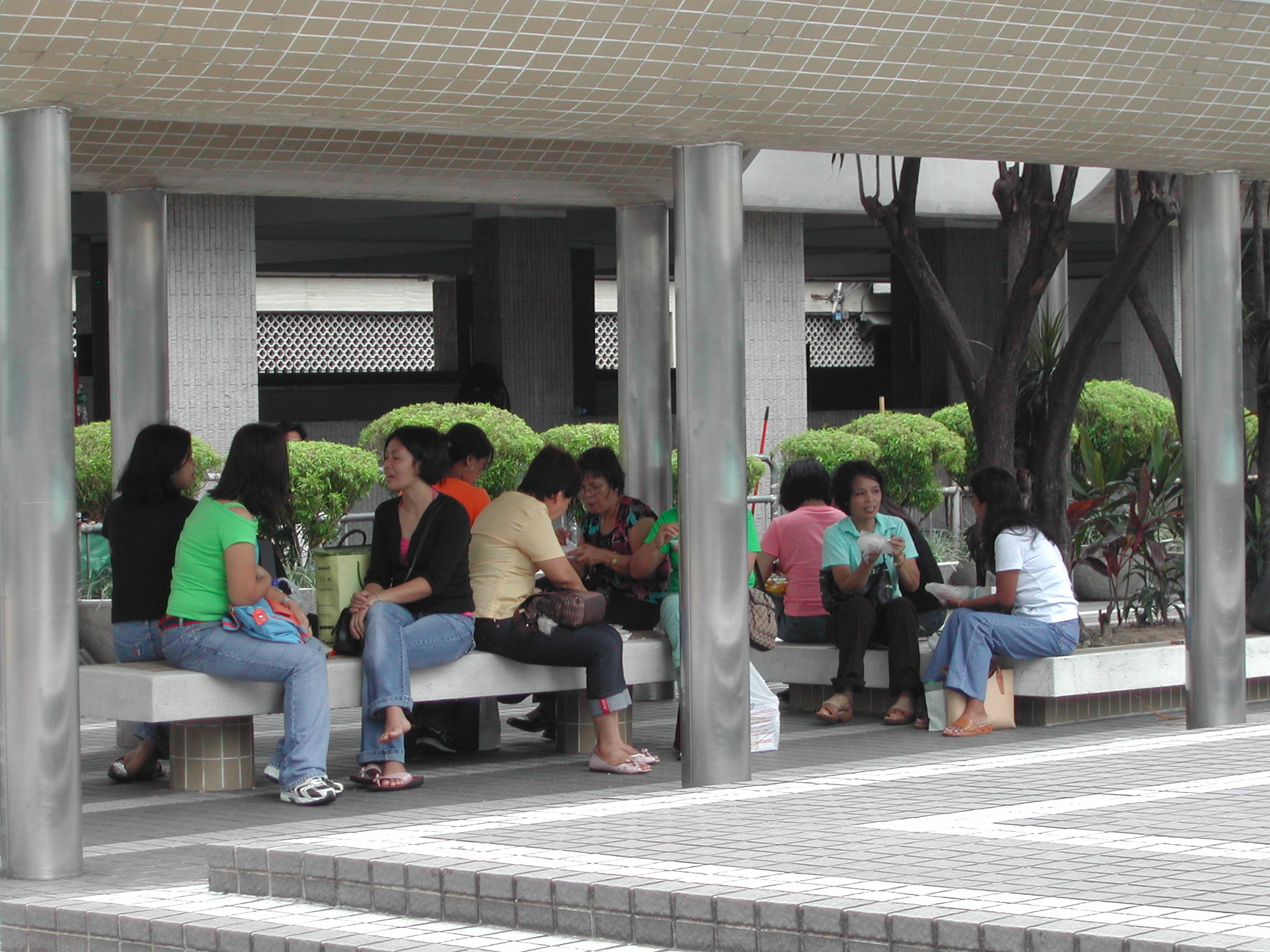
Filipina migrant workers in Hong Kong

Women migrant workers play an important role in economic development in Southeast Asia. For decades, countries in the region have either sent or received large numbers of women migrant workers. Demand for contract labor in the Arab states as well as other Southeast and East Asian countries has led to significant emigration amongst women workers in the Philippines, Indonesia, Sri Lanka and Thailand. By the 1990s, the Philippines had become the world's largest source of government-sponsored emigrant workers. Upwards of 700,000 migrant workers were emigrating from the Philippines each year, most of whom were women. Today, Filipino migrant workers send over $24 billion in remittances annually, which accounts for 8-10% of the Philippines’ GDP.

Large numbers of Southeast Asian emigrant women pursue domestic and care work, a phenomenon that scholars refer to as "the global nanny chain" or "the international division of reproductive labor". In fact, in Southeast Asian countries such as the Philippines, over 60% of emigrant workers are women, and over two-thirds of these women pursue domestic work. Similarly, in Indonesia, 70% of all emigrant workers leaving Indonesia for Saudi Arabia, Singapore, Malaysia, Hong Kong, and South Korea are women seeking domestic and care work.

Some Southeast Asian governments have actively promoted the emigration of women workers, both to reduce unemployment and increase remittances. In Indonesia, for example, the Department of Manpower set up a Center for Overseas Employment, along with training programs for potential emigrant women domestic workers to improve their domestic service skills.

Meanwhile, labor shortages have caused other Southeast Asian countries, such as Singapore and Malaysia, to turn to immigrant workers as a cheap source of labor. In Singapore, the increase in women migrant domestic workers parallels an increase in the workforce participation rate of Singaporean women. Between the 1980s and 1990s, the women workforce participation rates amongst women in Singapore increased by 70%. Similarly, the number of women migrant domestic workers also increased significantly, and by 1999, Singapore had over 100,000 immigrant women domestic workers in a small city-state with just under 4 million residents.

Millions of Burmese women migrate to Thailand each year, where they work almost exclusively in agriculture and manufacturing. The Thai manufacturing and agricultural sectors are dependent on Burmese migrants – more than half of whom are women – due to the migrants' low pay and long working hours. As these Burmese migrant workers are typically undocumented, they receive limited protection under Thai law. In fact, they often face aggression from the Thai government and police force.

=== Latin America and the Caribbean ===
As of 2019, women made up 49.9% – or nearly half – of all international migrants in Latin America and the Caribbean. In addition, the proportion of women migrant workers has increased between 2000 and 2019.

=== Africa ===
There has been an increase in women migrants working within Africa. Due to the high rates of poverty and unemployment in the continent, many women have had to seek employment or even become the main providers for their families. Women workers often migrate within the region to work in the agricultural and mining sectors, as well as to North America and Europe, where there is a high demand for care workers.

== Types of employment ==
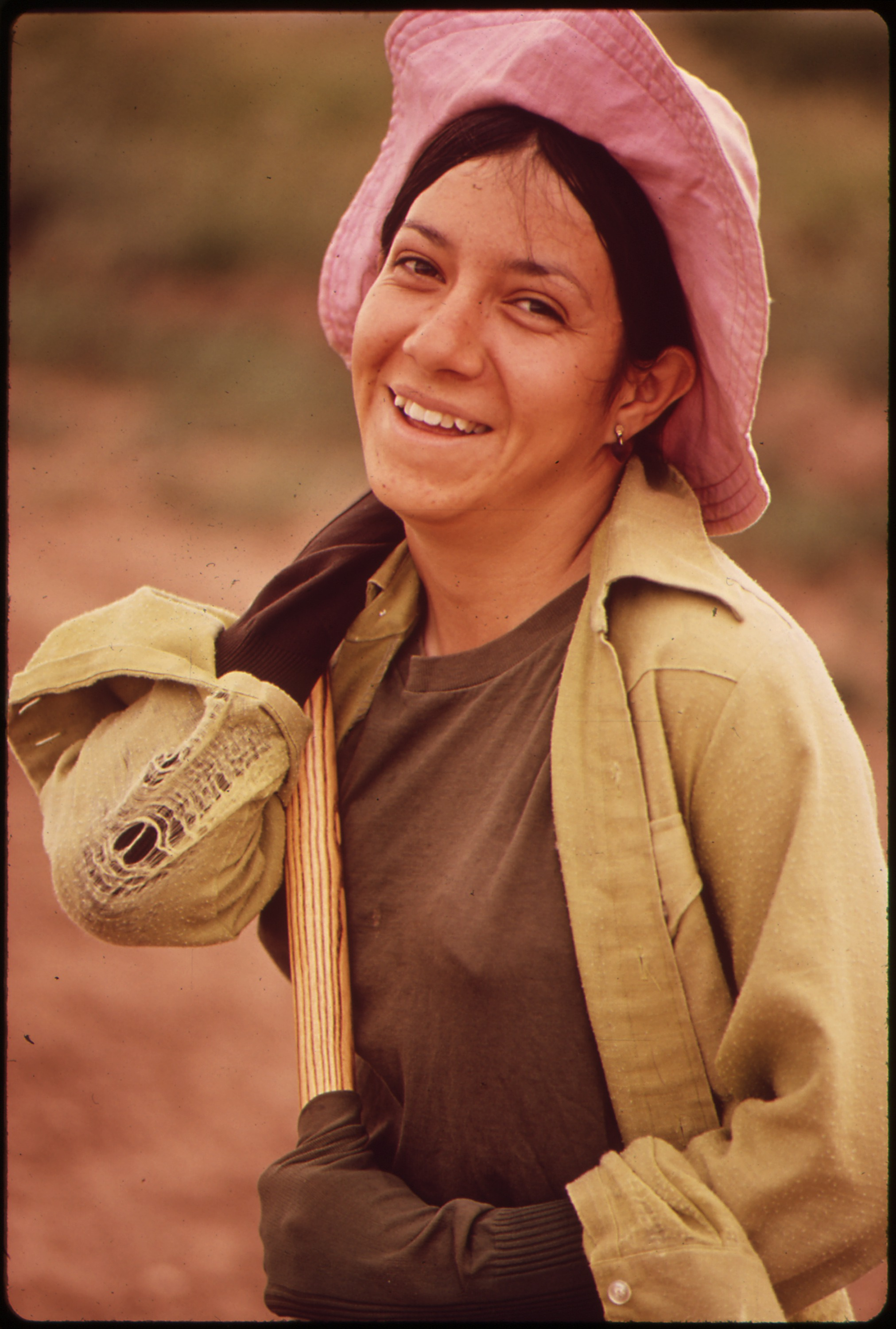
Young migrant woman worker weeding sugar beets at Fort Collins, United States in 1972

Women migrant workers tend to be concentrated in a narrow range of highly gendered professions, including both unregulated industries such as agriculture, domestic and care work, and the sex industry, as well as highly skilled professions such as nursing.

=== Domestic and care work ===
Domestic and care work is a highly gendered profession that is dominated by women. In Europe, both the aging population and welfare cuts have led to an increasing demand for migrant domestic workers. In other countries like Singapore, increased women workforce participation rates have driven the demand for migrant domestic workers. As a result of this demand, domestic and care work is now the most common profession pursued by women migrant workers.

Paid domestic and care work by migrant women is often undervalued the same way unpaid reproductive labor has always been. Some countries also use the concept of “family membership” to justify denying migrant domestic workers the same protections other migrant workers enjoy. For example, when deciding whether a Romanian migrant domestic worker should be given overtime pay, the Israeli courts asked, “would a mother demand overtime for attending to her children at night?” Similarly, in the UK, laws governing work hour limits, rights to breaks, and night work limits specifically exclude domestic workers.

In addition, migrant domestic workers are often forced to live-in with their employers, where they are “invisible” to the public and especially vulnerable to abuse. Widespread sexual, psychological and physical abuse has been reported amongst migrant domestic workers in a range of countries, including Hong Kong, many of the Arab states, and Italy.

However, migrant domestic worker laws have been changing in some countries. For example, domestic workers who immigrated to Canada via the Live-in Caregiver program prior to 2014 were required to live with their employers, but the new Home Child Care Provider Pilot no longer has such a requirement.

Women migrant domestic workers are rarely able to immigrate with their families. As a result, a phenomenon called "mothering" happens where they often "transplant" their love for their own children onto the children they care for, forming close bonds with their charges. For example, in Canada, there have not been sufficient family reunification efforts for migrant women. This results in a strain in familial relationships as "the very women who are good enough to raise white Canadian children cannot raise their own children, who are not allowed entry with them."

== Impacts on countries of origin ==
=== Economic impacts ===
Studies conducted in the Philippines, Sri Lanka and Malaysia have shown that migrant women seek employment abroad primarily to help pay for their families’ basic expenses and healthcare needs. As of 2015, migrant workers remitted over $601 billion to their countries of origin. Developing countries received over $441 billion of that total, three time as much as the developmental assistance and almost as much as the foreign direct investment they received. In developing countries like Nepal, foreign remittances account for almost 25% of GDP. In addition, many migrant workers send remittances through informal channels, so the actual total is even higher.

While studies in Mexico and the Philippines have shown that men remit more and a larger proportion of their incomes than do women, other studies in Bangkok, Laos and rural Philippines have found that women remit a larger proportion of their income. Data from the World Bank suggests that even though women migrant workers typically earn less than their male counterparts, their contributions account for half of the $601 billion in formal remittances sent in 2015.

Remittances from women migrant workers are more likely to be used for “health, education, family and community development”, while men's remittances tend to be used for investments. In developing countries such as Nepal, the majority of remittances made by women migrant workers go towards poverty reduction at the household level. A study of Nepalese women migrant workers showed that 45% of used their remittances exclusively to provide basic needs such as food and healthcare, and schooling for their children. On a macroeconomic level, remittances can also help countries of origin cope with trade deficits, reduce pressure on local currency, and reduce external debt.

However, other studies have questioned the existence of a “migration-development” nexus for women migrant workers. While remittances have spurred development in some countries, in other communities, they have adversely affected growth.

=== Impacts of maternal migration ===
The emigration of women migrant workers has led to an unequal international division of reproductive labor. As women migrant workers leave their countries of origin to pursue domestic work in other countries, they often leave behind a deficit in domestic labor in their countries of origin that female relatives or less privileged local women will have to take on.

The emigration of mothers in particular can profoundly impact the social and emotional well-being of their children. A study of children in Sri Lanka with mothers working abroad showed that these children suffered from mental health conditions at higher rates than the control group. Despite migrant mothers’ efforts to remain in touch with their children, their interactions are often irregular and “fall short of meaningful exchange”. As a result, these children often grow up without getting to know their parents. The children's educations are also affected by the lack of supervision and parental support.

=== Impacts on gender roles ===
Some women migrate in order to escape oppressive gender norms, leaving their home and obtaining increased economic independence and freedom. This can strengthen a woman's position in the family by improving her relative bargaining position. Women workers have greater leverage in the household because they have control over a degree of economic assets.

Liu, a sociologist who studies gender, sexuality, family and work in China, argues that social roles follow migrant workers in their new environments. There is a strong connection between a woman's role in her rural life to her new life in an urban city or foreign country. Women accept the treatment they receive because it is normalized by their traditional and domestic roles, e.g. their roles at home as homemaker and houseworker.

On the other hand, Beneria, a Spanish-American economist, contends that gender roles evolve as women from Latin America leave their families and move to pursue domestic care work in Western Europe. She concedes that most migrant workers work in highly gendered professions such as domestic and care work, where their traditional gender roles are reinforced. However, she also argues that a woman's choice to leave and provide remittances for her family initiates a reversal in gender roles within her family.

The emigration of women also forces men who are left at home to adapt to changing gender norms. For example, it has become more common for women from Sri Lanka to immigrate to the Middle East to pursue domestic work. This emigration forces men who remain in the villages of Sri Lanka to adopt new gender norms that may be contrary to traditional gender ideals. Some of these men cope by drinking alcohol, which is seen as a masculine activity. Other men find work of their own, both in, and outside of, their communities. Even though these men often earn less than their migrant wives, they do not fully renounce their traditional roles as the breadwinners of their families, and are thus able to maintain some of their masculinity. The few men who choose to shoulder the domestic burden that women typically do are often looked down upon for being "too feminine". As they are no longer the breadwinners of their families, they are considered by some in their community to no longer be "men".

== Impacts on destination countries ==
Globalization facilitates the transfer of reproductive labor from privileged women in high-income countries to women migrant domestic workers from developing countries. This delegation of household work enables more women from developed countries to pursue their careers in the same way men do. In Singapore, the large influx of foreign maids between 1980 and 1994 paralleled a 70% increase in the workforce participation rate of married Singapore women. Hui argues that this increase would not have been possible without the immigration of women domestic workers.

In many developed countries, such as the United States, aging populations have led to a greater demand for long-term care workers. As a result, these developed countries are increasingly turning to women migrant workers to meet their elder care needs. In the United States, 75% of in-home eldercare providers in Los Angeles and 95% of care home operators in Hawaii are Filipina migrant workers. Browne et al. argue that the United States’ reliance on women migrant workers in the long-term care sector has legitimized the low pay of workers in this industry and devalued the eldercare profession as a whole.

== Impacts on women migrant workers ==
=== Exploitation and abuse ===
Women migrant workers are primarily employed in informal sectors, and are often either not covered or only partially covered by the labor legislation, social security, and welfare provisions of their host countries. Exploitation of women migrant workers is less identifiable than that of male migrant workers because the exploitation of women often occurs in situations with weak labor inspection services. Women migrant domestic workers in particular are often isolated, and can become dependent upon their employers. Examples of maltreatment include: not getting paid, restricted movement, removal of personal identity documents, long shifts, working for a whole week without days-off, sexual exploitation, and poor living conditions with inadequate food, water, and accommodation. There have also reportedly been cases of employers confiscating personal belongings (i.e. passports, mobile devices) and locking cupboards and fridges to prevent migrant domestic workers from taking eating breaks

In addition, Cheng argues that migrant women workers are isolated even within their own social circles. As a result, they often have poor support systems, which further increases their dependence on their employers' households and places them in a vulnerable position.

=== Reproductive health ===
Some Gulf states, such as the United Arab Emirates and Kuwait, forbid women migrant workers from engaging in sexual activities. If these women become pregnant during their time in the Gulf, they are imprisoned for a year for the crime of zina. They have to give birth in prison and are forcibly separated from their children when deported.

== International responses ==
The International Labour Organization (ILO) has provided a list of ameliorative measures that should be implemented by governments and organizations in donor, transit, and destination countries in order to improve the experiences of female and male migrant workers alike. Some of these measures include the following:

- Implementation of ILO Conventions on Migrant Workers, Nos. 97 and 143; ILO Convention No. 111 on Non-discrimination and Equality; ILO Conventions Nos. 19, 118, 157 and 165 on Social Security.
- Guarantee of health care access to migrant workers and accompanying family members.
- Protection of migrant worker rights to join trade unions and other migrant associations.
- Enforcement of guidelines for ethical recruitment and supervision of private recruitment.
- Acknowledgement of migrant worker qualifications obtained in home countries.
- Provision of migrant workers with pre-departure information, training on social and labor conditions in destination countries, life insurance, pension plans, medical insurance, and basic language training.

UNIFEM (now UN Women) is a branch of the United Nations dedicated to the support and defense of women workers. As the advent of migrant work has become more prevalent among women, UNIFEM has had to help keep their rights protected. This includes establishing a human rights standard, timely payment, rest days, medical care, and housing investigation. UNIFEM has promoted several laws similar to the law on the Protection of Migrant Women in Indonesia. Their goal is to make a universal code of ethics and treatment for all those engaging in migration for work or other reasons.

Authors Tonya Basok and Nicola Piper discuss the global governance of international migration efforts undertaken by the non-governmental organizations trying to protect the rights of Latin Americans and those from the Caribbean, moving to Europe. They argue that although the management of trafficking the women to and from their country of origin has improved, the management of labor rights abroad is difficult due to the lack of rights promotions as opposed to management efforts.

== See also ==
- Inequality within immigrant families in the United States
- Internal migration
- International migration
- Karayuki-san
- Migrant sex work
- Migrant worker
- Nanny
- Reproductive labor
- Rural flight
- Rural society in China
