= Walter Scott (artist) =

Comic book artist

Walter Scott (born 1985) is a Canadian interdisciplinary artist, He is best known for the Wendy series of graphic novels, published by Drawn & Quarterly.

== Background ==
Scott is from Kahnawá:ke in Quebec. He attended the University of Guelph, where he graduated with a Master of Fine Arts.

== Wendy Comics ==
Scott initially created the character Wendy as a doodle on a barmat, satirising the types of characters in the Canadian art scene. After initially being released as a zine, the first book in the series, Wendy, was published in 2014. In a review for The Walrus, Chris Hampton noted that "Though Wendy’s escapades are fiction, Scott’s economical and expressionistic black-and-white cartoons may be one of the most faithful representations of a young artist attempting to climb the Canadian art world, with its hobnobbery, esoteric granting systems, imperative side hustles, and—most Canadian of all—the dream of success abroad. Wendy is a bit of a mess, but that’s at least partly because the art world she’s trying to crack into is pretty messed up too."

The sequel Wendy's Revenge was published in 2016. This includes a section set in Yokohama which was originally published as a zine in Japanese in Japan; in the book this is presented with the English language text on a separate page on the right. The Comics Journal said in a review that "in addition to his operatically expressive drawings, Scott’s satire still manages to provoke genuine sympathy and pathos for his characters, as they strive to find their footing in a difficult profession at a notoriously confusing time of life."

The third book in the series, Wendy, Master of Art was published in 2020. The New Yorker ran a feature on its release, noting that "Scott’s fairly tight concentration on the foibles of art school puts this book in league with other texts that have come before it, like Dan Clowes’s “Art School Confidential, or Rachel B. Glaser’s novel, Paulina and Fran.

In 2024 he published The Wendy Award.

== Filmmaking ==
In 2023, he was named one of the inaugural recipients of the Jeff Barnaby Grant from the imagineNATIVE Film and Media Arts Festival, to fund a film project.

Organza's Revenge, his debut short film as a director, premiered at the 2024 Vancouver International Film Festival. It was subsequently screened at the 2025 Inside Out Film and Video Festival, where Scott won the award for Emerging Canadian Artist.
