= Quiet Killing =

2018 Canadian film by Kim O'Bomsawin

- French: Ce silence qui tue
- Directed by: Kim O'Bomsawin
- Produced by: Michèle Rouleau
- Starring: Lorelei Williams; Angel Gates; Tantoo Cardinal
- Cinematography: Stéphanie Weber-Biron
- Music by: Alain Auger; Moe Clark
- Production company: Wabanok
- Release date: 2018 (RVQC)
- Running time: 76 minutes
- Country: Canada
- Language: French

Quiet Killing (French: Ce silence qui tue) is a Canadian documentary film, directed by Kim O'Bomsawin and released in 2018. An examination of the issue of missing and murdered Indigenous women, the film explores the reasons why indigenous women are uniquely vulnerable to violence by juxtaposing the stories of some missing or murdered women with the personal testimonies of women who are doing activism on the issue and women who have personally survived incidents of violence.

The film's original French version premiered theatrically at the Rendez-vous Québec Cinéma in 2018, and the film was broadcast as an episode of APTN's television documentary series Perspectives APTN in both English and French versions.

The film won the Donald Brittain Award for Best Social or Political Documentary Program at the 7th Canadian Screen Awards.
