= Broken Angel (2022 film) =

2022 Canadian drama film

- Cree: MaaShwaKan MaNiTo
- Directed by: Jules Arita Koostachin
- Written by: Jules Arita Koostachin
- Produced by: Patti Poskitt; Jules Arita Koostachin; Anne Wheeler
- Starring: Sera-Lys McArthur; Brooklyn Letexier-Hart; Asivak Koostachin
- Cinematography: Sarah Thomas Moffat
- Edited by: Lara Mazur
- Music by: Wayne Lavallee
- Production company: Aashenii Productions
- Release date: October 20, 2022 (imagineNATIVE)
- Running time: 89 minutes
- Country: Canada
- Languages: English; Cree

Broken Angel (Cree: MaaShwaKan MaNiTo) is a Canadian drama film, directed by Jules Arita Koostachin and released in 2022. The film stars Sera-Lys McArthur as Angel, an indigenous woman who undertakes a journey of spiritual and emotional recovery after taking her daughter Tanis (Brooklyn Letexier-Hart) and fleeing an abusive relationship with her husband Earl (Carlo Marks) to return to her home community.

The cast also includes Jessie Anthony, Isla Grant, Asivak Koostachin, Blu Mankuma and Quanah Style.

The script was inspired in part by women that Jules Arita Koostachin had met and worked with in her prior career in social services. It features dialogue in both English and Cree, and entered production in November 2021 in British Columbia.

The film had its theatrical premiere at the 2022 imagineNATIVE Film and Media Arts Festival, and screened in the Borsos Competition at the 2022 Whistler Film Festival.

The film was longlisted for the Jean-Marc Vallée DGC Discovery Award at the 2022 Directors Guild of Canada awards.
