= B.C. roll =

Sushi containing barbecued salmon and cucumber

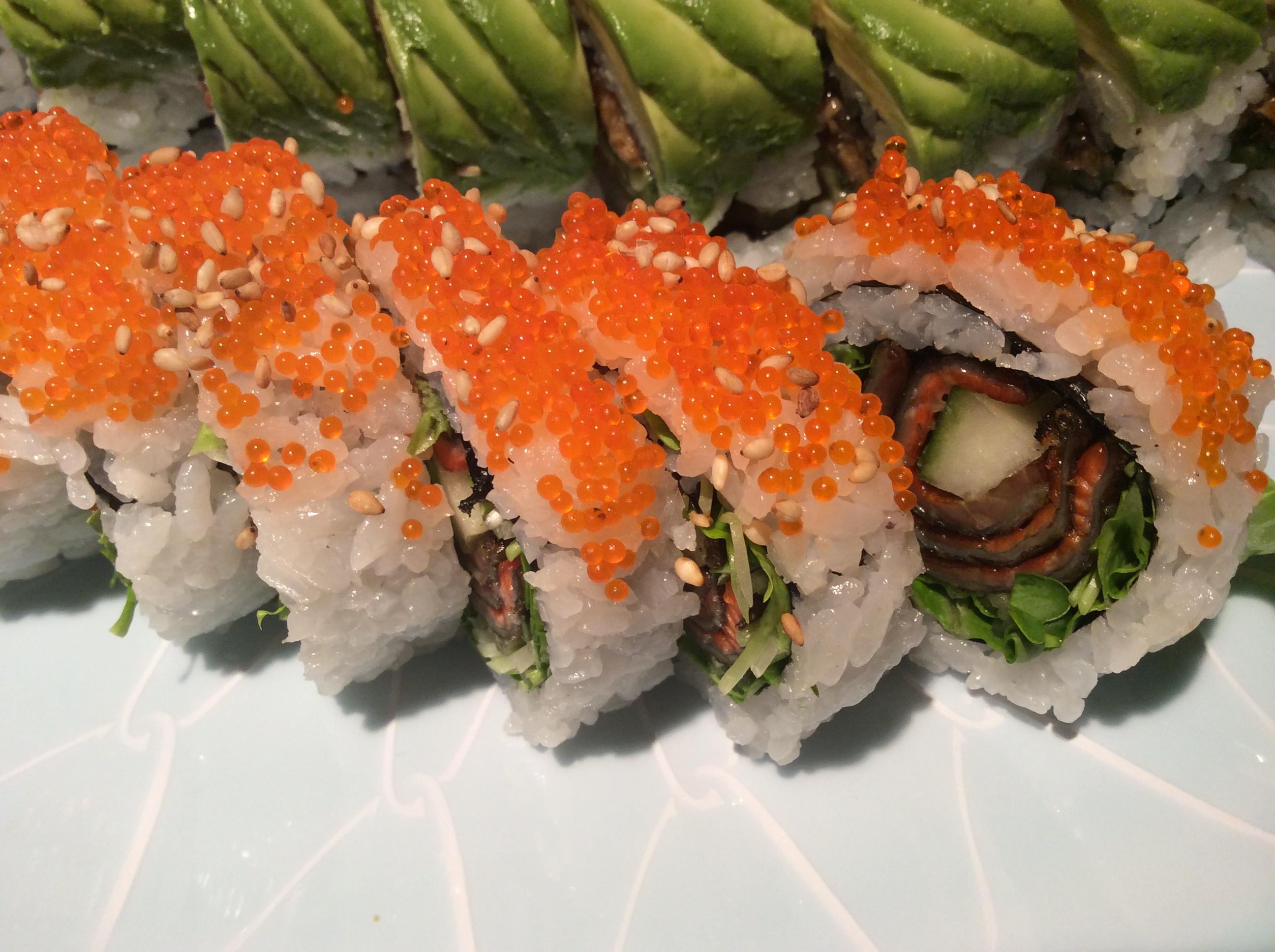
B.C. roll

The B.C. roll is a kind of sushi containing barbecued salmon and cucumber. It is prepared as an uramaki roll, a style of sushi in which the rice is on the outside. Often the roll contains barbecued salmon skin coated in a sweet sauce. There are many variations of this roll including barbecued salmon skin with mayo.

The name comes from the fact that British Columbia (B.C.) is famous for wild Pacific salmon. Many sushi restaurants in British Columbia serve the B.C. roll as a part of their menu. The Vancouver-based Japanese chef Hidekazu Tojo created the B.C. roll in 1974 when he used salmon skin in place of the traditional anago (salt-water eel), which was difficult to obtain in the West Coast.

== See also ==
- Canadian cuisine
- List of Canadian inventions and discoveries
