= Easy Land =

2019 Canadian drama film

- Film poster
- Directed by: Sanja Živković
- Written by: Sanja Živković
- Produced by: Julie Strifler
- Starring: Mirjana Joković; Nina Kiri
- Cinematography: Maya Bankovic
- Edited by: Chris Mutton
- Music by: Casey Manierka-Quaile
- Production companies: Endgame Films; Wildling Pictures
- Distributed by: Mongrel Media
- Release date: September 6, 2019 (TIFF)
- Running time: 90 minutes
- Country: Canada
- Language: English

Easy Land is a 2019 Canadian drama film, written and directed by Sanja Živković. The film stars Mirjana Joković and Nina Kiri as Jasna and Nina, a mother (a trained Architect) and daughter from Serbia who are struggling to adapt to their new lives after emigrating to Canada as refugees.

The film's cast also includes Daniel Kash, Richard Clarkin, Sarah Deakins, Arlene Duncan and Sugith Varughese.

The film premiered at the 2019 Toronto International Film Festival.

== Critical response ==
Alisha Mughal of Exclaim! rated the film 7 out of 10, writing that "it's a complex film that explores not just the difficulties refugees and immigrants experience as they try to convince their new country that they are capable enough, but also a fraught mother-daughter relationship, something we're not used to seeing on film. Jasna and Nina do love each other, but they also fight viciously, with the younger Nina oftentimes taking the role of mother, and Jasna the foolhardy teen. The film is also an excellent exploration of mental illness, poverty, and hope."
