= Chubby Cree =

Cree hand drum group

Chubby Cree is a Cree hand drum ensemble whose main members are Noah Green and his grandmother Carol Powder. They are based in Edmonton, Alberta.

== Origins ==
Powder and Green are members of the Samson Cree Nation. Powder was raised as a native Cree speaker and was first taught to sing by her grandfather. Powder reports that she first heard Green sing at the age of eight months, when he mimicked a tune she was singing to him as she put him to bed. She bought him his first drum when he was one year old, and he first performed in a group at the age of two.

In September 2024, Powder, her husband, and their 10 grandchildren found themselves homeless after being evicted because their landlord planned to sell the house they were renting, and they faced anti-Indigenous discrimination in finding a new home. They found a new home later that year with the help of an outpouring of community support, including from the charity Jordan's Principle, MLA Janis Irwin, and the bookstore Audreys Books.

== Musical career ==
The group is named after a nickname given to Powder's younger brother Rick, who had died in 2016. The ensemble Chubby Cree was originally mostly women, comprising Powder, Green, and four of Powder's daughters; Powder has been a strong opponent of protocols that keep women from playing the drum at powwows. Powder and Green are the main members now, although they are sometimes still joined by Powder's daughter Robin or others. Powder and Green both sing and drum, and Green has been particularly acclaimed for his powerful voice.

Chubby Cree's first major performance as a duo was outside the Alberta Legislature Building before Greta Thunberg took the stage at the October 2019 Strike for Climate Action. Green was nine years old at the time. They have since played at numerous other events, including the commemoration of the National Day for Truth and Reconciliation in Surrey, British Columbia in 2022 and memorials for homeless people who died in Edmonton. Powder and Green play many traditional songs but also write their own, and in 2022 released their first single, "Rock Your World".

In 2023, the group was the subject of Jules Koostachin's documentary Chubby Cree: PiMahCiHoWin (The Journey), which was released through Telus Originals. In 2024, their story was the subject of a picture book, The Heartbeat Drum by Deirdre Havrelock.
