= Ari's Theme =

2024 Canadian documentary film

- Directed by: Nathan Drillot; Jeff Lee Petry
- Written by: Nathan Drillot; Jeff Lee Petry; Ari Kinarthy
- Produced by: Nathan Drillot; Jeff Lee Petry
- Starring: Ari Kinarthy
- Cinematography: Nathan Drillot; Jeff Lee Petry; Kaayla Whachell
- Edited by: Graham Fortin; Benjamin Schuetze
- Music by: Ari Kinarthy
- Production company: Salazar Film
- Release date: April 30, 2024 (Hot Docs)
- Running time: 99 minutes
- Country: Canada
- Language: English

Ari's Theme is a 2024 Canadian documentary film, directed by Nathan Drillot and Jeff Lee Petry. The film profiles Ari Kinarthy, a Canadian composer suffering from type-2 spinal muscular atrophy, as he endeavours to create an epic musical composition that will serve as his artistic legacy.

The film premiered at the 2024 Hot Docs Canadian International Documentary Festival. It was subsequently screened as the opening film of the 2024 Vancouver International Film Festival, in a special event with members of the Vancouver Symphony Orchestra performing the film's score live in the theatre.
