= Kim O'Bomsawin =

Canadian Abenaki writer, filmmaker and activist

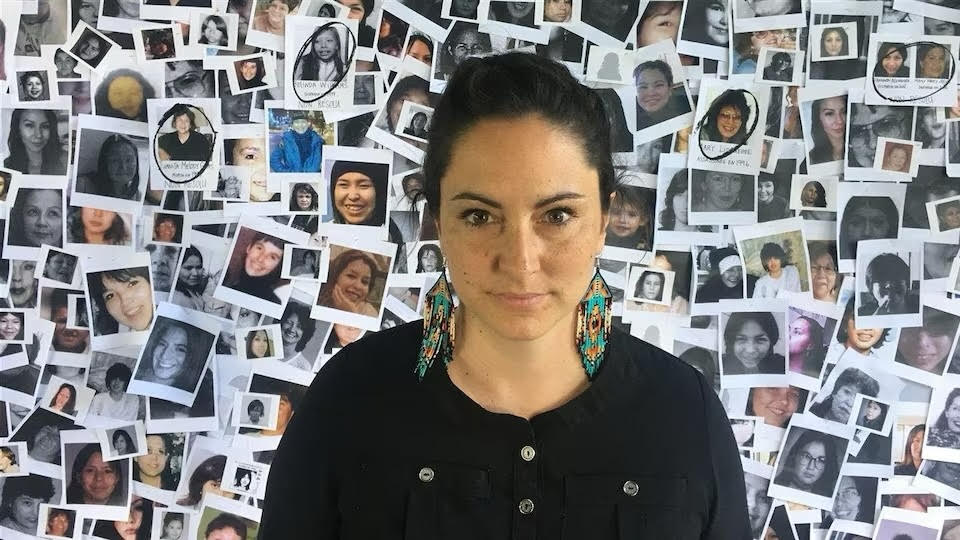
Kim O'Bomsawin in 2018

Kim O’Bomsawin is a writer, film director, and a human rights activist specifically for Indigenous women in Canada and the U.S. O'Bomsawin is of Abenaki origin, which is a First Nation in Quebec, Canada. She is considered a leading indigenous filmmaker.

== Biography ==
She graduated with a master's degree in sociology and later pursued a career in documentary filmmaking. O'Bomsawin has co-written on the docu-series Skindigenous and has written and directed La ligne rouge in 2014, Kirano in 2015, Quiet Killing (Ce silence qui tue) in 2017, Du Teweikan à l’électro in 2017 and Call Me Human (Je m'appelle humain) in 2020.

== Film career ==
Skindigenous aired in Canada in 2018. The docu-series conveys that tattoos are an ancient art and not relegated to one continent or one set group of people. The producers travel around the world to seek out and learn how ancient tribal heritage is carried into today as part of a tattoo culture. Each episode covers a particular part of the world and the people practicing this unique art.

The Red Line is Kim O'Bomsawin's first film. The film explores hockey as a practice in Quebec's aboriginal communities. The documentary has a specific focus on Amy-Léa, Mikisew and Frédérik, who like many young Canadians give everything to hockey. The title pertains to the internal conflict these players face while making heart-wrenching choices between cultural practices and the sport. The film also sheds light on how sports prevent delinquency which persist in low-income First Nation communities.

Kirano is a web documentary that follows the story of 10 aboriginal personalities, most notably rapper Samian, politician Alexis Wawanoloath and snowboard athlete Caroline Calvé. All 10 of the featured people are asked to answer: How to define yourself as indigenous in 2015. O'Bomsawin creatively divides this film into 10 video clips that are available online.

Quiet Killing is O'Bomsawin's most notable film, for its firsthand accounts of the many missing and murdered indigenous women in Canada. Through this film, O'Bomsawin humanizes a social injustice that is largely unaddressed.

Most recently, O'Bomsawin created a project called From Teweikan to Electro, which celebrates the value of unifying through the sound of vibrations. In the film project she features singer-songwriters Pakesso Mukash (Cri / Abenaki), Shauit (Innu) and Moe Clark (Métis) whom obatina foothold in the fold elector and reggae music communities and strive to create connections between generations, the living and the dead, territories, conquered and rebellious. O'Bomsawin commits this project to tracing the history of First Nation music.

In 2023 she created the documentary series Telling Our Story.

Her documentary film Ninan Auassat: We, the Children (Ninan Auassat: Nous, les enfants) premiered at the 2024 Vancouver International Film Festival, where it won the award for Best Canadian Documentary.

She collaborated with poet Joséphine Bacon, who had been the subject of Call Me Human, as co-directors of the documentary film Nitassinan, which is slated to premiere at the First Peoples' Festival (Présence Autochtone) in 2026.

== Political activism ==
Besides her consistent dedication to amplifying the voices of First Nation people in her documentary films, Kim O'Bomsawin extends her activism to ensure that indigenous people are represented and respected in the world of art. She spoke on the importance of representation in her critique of playwright Robert Lepage's Kanata. The play aimed to cover the history of the relationship between white and Indigenous people in Canada, but it was cancelled in July 2017 after more than 30 members of the Canadian Indigenous community, including Kim O'Bomsawin, wrote an open letter to Montreal's Le Devoir newspaper denouncing Lepage for not including indigenous performers in the show. In an interview she says, "I thought, 'Maybe with the experience I have, I can talk some sense into (Lepage), to make him see what it represents on a human scale — the pain of people.' Is it really necessary (to exclude indigenous actors), in the name of art? Sure you have the right, but is it really necessary?"

Recently O'Bomsawin commented on the blackface scandal of Canadian Prime Minister Justin Trudeau, stating how it was shocking to see the Canadian leader in blackface.
