= The Stand (2024 film) =

2024 Canadian documentary film

- Official film poster
- Directed by: Christopher Auchter
- Written by: Christopher Auchter
- Produced by: Shirley Vercruysse
- Starring: Delores Churchill
- Edited by: Sarah Hedar
- Music by: Genevieve Vincent
- Animation by: Christopher Auchter
- Production company: National Film Board of Canada
- Release date: October 3, 2024 (VIFF)
- Running time: 95 minutes
- Country: Canada
- Languages: English; Haida

The Stand is a Canadian documentary film, directed by Christopher Auchter and released in 2024. Combining archival footage with animation, the film profiles the 1985 blockade of Lyell Island by the Haida Nation to protect the island's old-growth forests from logging operations.

== Distribution ==
The film premiered at the 2024 Vancouver International Film Festival, where it received an honourable mention from the Best British Columbia Film award jury, and was awarded the Northern Lights audience award.

It was selected for the 2025 Big Sky Documentary Film Festival, where it had its US premiere on February 17, 2025.

== Awards ==
The film received a nomination for the DGC Allan King Award for Best Documentary Film at the 2025 Directors Guild of Canada awards.

Genevieve Vincent received a Canadian Screen Award nomination for Best Original Music in a Documentary at the 14th Canadian Screen Awards in 2026.
