= Lucky Star (2024 film) =

2024 Canadian drama film directed by Gillian McKercher

- Directed by: Gillian McKercher
- Written by: Gillian McKercher
- Produced by: Guillaume Carlier; Matt Drake; Amanda Verhagen; Nicola Waugh
- Starring: Terry Chen; Olivia Cheng
- Cinematography: Charles Hamilton
- Edited by: Xi Feng
- Music by: Meredith Bates; Rebecca Bruton
- Production companies: Kino Sum Films; Notable Content
- Distributed by: Game Theory Films
- Release date: September 28, 2024 (CIFF)
- Running time: 85 minutes
- Country: Canada
- Language: English

Lucky Star is a Canadian drama film, written and directed by Gillian McKercher and released in 2024. The film stars Terry Chen as Lucky, a Chinese Canadian dad raising his family in suburban Calgary, Alberta, who gets drawn into gambling as he attempts to recover money he lost after being scammed.

The cast also includes Olivia Cheng, Conni Miu, Austyn Van de Kamp, John Dylan Louie, Andrew Phung, CJ Collard, Summer Ly, Isra Abdelrahim, Mary Armstrong, Carlo Cuizon, Dustin Nelson and Sharon Umeh.

== Production ==
According to McKercher, the film was inspired in part by an unconfirmed family legend that her great-grandfather had been a wealthy landlord who owned an entire block of his city's Chinatown, but gambled it away in a card game.

She began writing the film in 2019 and completed the script while studying at the Canadian Film Centre, although it ultimately entered production through her own Kino Sum film studio rather than as her CFC student project.

== Release ==
The film premiered as the closing film of the 2024 Calgary International Film Festival, and was subsequently screened at the 2024 Vancouver International Film Festival. It had originally also been announced for the 2024 Cinéfest Sudbury International Film Festival, but was subsequently withdrawn from that festival by its distributor so that the screening in Calgary, McKercher's hometown, would be the world premiere.
