= Jerome Yoo =

Canadian actor and filmmaker

Jerome Yoo is a Canadian actor and film director from Vancouver, British Columbia. He is most noted for his 2024 feature debut film Mongrels, for which he won the Horizon Award for Emerging Canadian Director at the 2024 Vancouver International Film Festival, and received Vancouver Film Critics Circle award nominations for Best British Columbia Director and One to Watch at the Vancouver Film Critics Circle Awards 2024. In 2025, Yoo received two Canadian Screen Awards nominations for Mongrels, including the John Dunning Best First Feature Film Award and Best Original Screenplay.

Born in Seoul, South Korea, he emigrated to Canada with his family in childhood. He spent the majority of his childhood growing up in Coquitlam, British Columbia. He developed an interest in film while studying at the University of British Columbia. He had various acting roles, and directed a number of short films, prior to making his debut feature film Mongrels. His most noted short film, Idols Never Die (2019), was co-written with actress Andrea Bang.
