= Sera-Lys McArthur =

Canadian actress

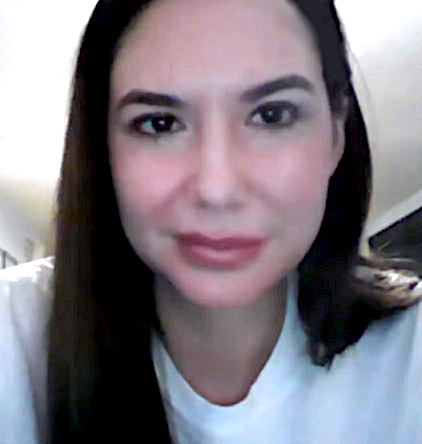
- McArthur in 2021
- Born: 1986 (age 39–40); Regina, Saskatchewan, Canada
- Citizenship: Pheasant Rump Nakota First Nation, Canada
- Education: East 15 Acting School
- Occupation: Actress
- Years active: 1999 – present

Sera-Lys McArthur is a Canadian actress whose roles include Hailey Martin in CBC's Arctic Air, Amanda in Hard Rock Medical, and Kodie Chartrand in season 3 of The CW's legal drama television series Burden of Truth. McArthur is proud of her indigenous Assiniboine heritage and hopes to act as role model for aspiring actors of all diverse ethnicities. As for video games, in the 21st expansion to be added into Tom Clancy's Rainbow Six Siege, she plays the role of Mina "Thunderbird" Sky—a Canadian operator of Nakota ancestry.

== Early life ==
McArthur was born and brought up in Regina, Saskatchewan, Her father was Nakota/Assiniboine Pheasant Rump Nakota First Nation and her mother was a German-Canadian actress.

McArthur started her training at high school age, singing, acting, dancing attending musical theatre and TV and film workshops. At the age of 18, McArthur moved to the United States to study post-secondary music theatre training at the American Musical and Dramatic Academy in New York City. Following this she moved to British Columbia to study method, Studio and Meisner technique acting classes, also general arts at Capilano University in Vancouver. She furthered her acting education in England at from East 15 Acting School at the University of Essex in Loughton, Essex, to become a classically trained actor, graduating with a Master of Arts degree in acting with distinction. McArthur moved back to New York City and Toronto and likened the travelling of her acting career to "following the buffalo," as was the nomadic way of her Nakota/Assiniboine ancestors.

== Career ==
McArthur's debut screen appearance was at age 13 while working for a children's modelling agency in the 1999 CBC TV movie/miniseries Revenge of the Land as the daughter of fellow native American and Outlander actress Carmen Moore. McArthur played the role of Azrael in The Lost Angel in 2004. Between 2012 and 2014, McArthur played Hailey Martin for 8 episodes of CBC's Arctic Air. The same year, while filming Skye & Chang in 2014, McArthur performed many stunts herself, having previously completed three months of taekwondo and martial-arts training. McArthur was purported to be proud that her work on Arctic Air and Skye & Chang both heralded diversity, and highlighted McArthur herself as a television role model for Native American youth, as fellow indigenous actress Tantoo Cardinal is to her. McArthur was a lead actor in the TV-movie Skye & Chang which won the award for best short live feature at the American Indian Film Festival in San Francisco. McArthur was nominated for best lead actress for films with strong aboriginal characters, for both Skye & Chang and The Wolf of Waubamik Woods at the American Indian Film Festival.

Between 2015 and 2018, McArthur played Amanda for 13 episodes of Hard Rock Medical, also in 2018 she plays female lead in Amazon Prime's indie heist film Robbery, followed with a single appearance in 2019 in the Starz television series Outlander as the Mohawk healer Johiehon. In 2020, McArthur stars as Kodie Chartrand, who is of Ojibwe heritage, for 7 episodes of season 3 of The CW's legal drama television series Burden of Truth.

McArthur had main acting roles in two short films chosen to be shown at the 2020 Indianer Inuit: North American Film Festival in Stuttgart, Germany. McArthur played Sasha in Magic Madeleines and Amanda in Blood Lineage both were due to be shown in February 2020. McArthur starred in the film in Monkey Beach which was a selection for the Winnipeg Aboriginal Film Festival (WAFF) in December 2020.

At the 2021 Blood in the Snow Canadian Film Festival in Toronto, McArthur won two Bloodie Awards: Best Lead Acting Performance in a Feature for her work in Don't Say Its Name, and Best Lead Acting Performance in a Short Film for her work in the short film Kweskosiw (she whistles).

She won the award for Best Actress at the 2022 American Indian Film Festival, for her performance in the film Broken Angel.

== Filmography ==
=== Film ===
Year	Title	Role
2004	The Lost Angel	Azreal
2008	Free to Go (Short)	Laura
2010	Hard Core Logo 2	Jules
2011	Nootka Rose (Short)	Chinook
2013	The Wolf of Waubamik Woods (Short)	Amber-Lynn Murphy
2014	The RODE We Choose (Short)	Sera-Lys
2017	Blood Lineage (Short)	Amanda
2017	Pharmalarm (Short)	Karen
2018	We	Catori
2018	Magic Madeleines (Short)	Sasha
2018	Robbery	Winona
2018	Alterscape	Kimberly
2019	The River You Step In	Ailene
2020	To Serve or Protect (Short)	Detective Emily Romero
2020	Naval Gazing (Short)	Therapist
2020	Monkey Beach	Tabitha
2020	The Corruption of Divine Providence	Dr. McArthur
2021	Kwêskosîw: She Whistles (Short)	Stephanie
2021	Don't Say Its Name	Stacey Cole
2021	Heaven and Earth; A Ritual (Short)	May
2022	Broken Angel (MaaShwaKan MaNiTo)	Angel
2023	Café Daughter	Katherine Wong
2024	Angela's Shadow	Angela
2026	In the Heart of the South	Leena Aarluk

=== Television ===
Year	Title	Role	Notes
1999	Revenge of the Land	Mary	TV movie
2001	Incredible Story Studios	Witch	Children's TV
2008	Aliens in America	Cyra	1 episode - Community Theater
2008	The Englishman's Boy	Young Assiniboine Girl	Part One and Part Two
2014	Skye & Chang	Skye	TV movie
2012–2014	Arctic Air	Hailey Martin	8 episodes
2015–2018	Hard Rock Medical	Amanda	13 episodes
2019	Outlander	Johiehon	Season 4 - 1 episode - Providence
2019	Friends from College	Helena	1 episode - Out All Night
2020	Burden of Truth	Kodie Chartrand	7 episodes
2019-2020	Running with Violet	Martha	3 episodes - Call Me Clara - Role Play - Sleepy Town
2020	Meet Me for Coffee	Guest - Sera-Lys McArthur	1 episode
2021	Diggstown	Ronnie Maloney	2 episodes - Ivy Maloney and Nina Francis
2021	Pretty Hard Cases	Sgt. Gabrielle Beauchamp	10 episodes

== Awards and nominations ==
Year	Award	Category	Nominated work	Result	Ref.
2013	American Indian Film Festival	Best lead actress for films with strong aboriginal characters	Skye & Chang and The Wolf of Waubamik Woods	Nominated	
2020	American Indian Film Festival	Best Supporting Actress	Monkey Beach	Nominated	
2020	FFTG Awards	Best Supporting Actress	We	Won	
2021	Leo Awards	Best Supporting Performance by a Female in a Motion Picture	Monkey Beach	Nominated	
2021	Blood in the Snow Awards	Best Lead Acting Performance in a Feature Film	Don't Say Its Name	Won	
2021	Blood in the Snow Awards	Best Lead Acting Performance in a Short Film	Kwêskosîw: She Whistles	Won	
2022	Sunny Side Up Film Festival	Best Actress in a Western - Short	Heaven and Earth; A Ritual	Nominated	
2022	American Indian Film Festival	Best Actress	Broken Angel	Won	
2023	American Indian Film Festival	Best Supporting Actress	Café Daughter	Nominated	
2023	Red Nation Film Festival	Actress in a Supporting Role - Feature Film	Café Daughter	Nominated	
