= Angela's Shadow =

2024 Canadian drama film by Jules Arita Koostachin

- Film poster
- Directed by: Jules Arita Koostachin
- Written by: Jules Arita Koostachin; Steve Neufeld
- Produced by: Jules Arita Koostachin
- Starring: Sera-Lys McArthur; Matthew Kevin Anderson; Renae Morrisseau
- Cinematography: Mike Bourquin
- Edited by: Lara Mazur
- Music by: Justin Delorme
- Production company: Visjuelles Production
- Distributed by: Motion 58
- Release date: October 2, 2024 (VIFF)
- Running time: 93 minutes
- Country: Canada
- Language: English

Angela's Shadow is a 2024 Canadian drama film, directed by Jules Arita Koostachin. Set in the 1930s, the film stars Sera-Lys McArthur as Angela, a pregnant woman who travels with her husband Henry (Matthew Kevin Anderson) to a remote Cree community to visit her former childhood nanny Mary (Renae Morriseau); after being threatened by a shadowy figure, she learns the truth about her own previously unknown Cree heritage, and begins to deal with the impact of Henry's racist response to the prospect that his child will not be racially "pure".

The cast also includes Asivak Koostachin, Mahiigan Koostachin, David Lyle, Angie Nolan, Dustin McGladrey, Sierra Rose McRae, Stephen J.F. Walker, Justine Warrington, Rita Okimawinininew, Tapwewin Koostachin-Chakasim, Brooklyn Letexier-Hart, Erik Sikkerbol, Olivia Lucas and Rosie Johnnie-Mills in supporting roles.

The film premiered at the 2024 Vancouver International Film Festival, where it won the Audience Award for the Panorama program.
