= Mongrels (2024 film) =

2024 Canadian drama film directed by Jerome Yoo

- Film Poster
- Directed by: Jerome Yoo
- Written by: Jerome Yoo
- Produced by: Nach Dudsdeemaytha; Tesh Guttikonda
- Starring: Jae-Hyun Kim; Da-Nu Nam; Sein Jin
- Cinematography: Jaryl Lim
- Edited by: Lawrence Le Lam
- Music by: Jude Shih; Tae-Young Yu
- Production company: Musubi Arts
- Distributed by: Game Theory Films
- Release date: September 28, 2024 (VIFF)
- Running time: 106 minutes
- Country: Canada
- Languages: English; Korean

Mongrels is a 2024 Canadian drama film, written and directed by Jerome Yoo in his feature directorial debut. The film stars Jae-Hyun Kim as Sonny, a Korean widower who emigrates to Canada with his children Hajoon (Da-Nu Nam) and Hana (Sein Jin) after his wife's death; moving to a small town in the Canadian Prairies where he takes a job helping local farmers to cull the wild dogs that are plaguing their livelihoods, he finds that his status as a newcomer to Canadian society means he can relate more easily to the dogs than to his fellow townspeople.

The cast also includes Candyce Weir, Morgan Derera, Jedd Sharp, Sangbum Kang, Cassidy Karin, James Corwin Bryant, Katelyn Vanier, Joliana Francisco, Alan Ramon Ward, Megs Calleja, Duke Murrdodge, Chris Byron, Vivian Davidson-Castro, Ryan Haneman, Karen Hyeyeon Choi, Natasha Bruce and Charlotte Ray in supporting roles.

The film premiered at the 2024 Vancouver International Film Festival, where Yoo won the Horizon Award for Emerging Canadian Director. It later received the FIPRESCI Prize and a Special Jury Prize for its cast at the 2024 Tallinn Black Nights Film Festival.

== Production ==
The film received production funding from Telefilm Canada's Talent to Watch program for emerging filmmakers in 2020, and was subsequently supported by Game Theory Films's new distribution initiative for BIPOC filmmakers in 2021.

Jae-Hyun Kim, a former Korean actor who had retired from the business and was living off the grid in a distant suburb of Seoul, was found and cast only after Yoo travelled to Seoul to search for actors, and was set up on a video call with Kim through a mutual acquaintance.

== Release ==
The film premiered at the 2024 Vancouver International Film Festival, where Yoo won the Emerging Canadian Director award.

The film was the winner of the FIPRESCI prize at the 2024 Tallinn Black Nights Film Festival.
