= Hidekazu Tojo =

Japanese-Canadian chef

- Born: February 8, 1950 (age 76); Kagoshima, Japan
- Education: Apprenticed at Ohnoya in Osaka, Japan
- Occupation: Chef
- Culinary career
- Cooking style: Japanese cuisine
- Current restaurant: Tojo's Restaurant
- Website: https://tojos.com/

Hidekazu Tojo (東條英員, Tōjō Hidekazu) (born February 8, 1950, in Kagoshima, Japan) is a Japanese-born chef based in Vancouver, British Columbia, Canada. He is often credited with inventing the California roll and the B.C. roll.

== Career ==
Tojo first learned to cook at home, due in part to the fact his mother was vegetarian and Tojo and his siblings wanted meat.

In 1968, Tojo moved to Osaka to become a chef where he apprenticed at Ohnoya, a ryōtei restaurant. In 1971, he became a chef at an Osaka sushi restaurant. Shortly afterwards, in August 1971, Tojo moved to Vancouver, a city with only four Japanese restaurants at the time. Tojo first found work at Maneki, at the invitation of its owner, who was Tojo's sponsor to Canada. Tojo was then a chef at various restaurants until opening his eponymous restaurant, Tojo's, in October 1988. After 18 years at the same location, in 2007 Tojo moved his restaurant to a new custom-designed setting a few blocks east of its original location. Tojo normally works at the restaurant six days a week, but for an annual trip to Japan, in part to stay current with food trends in his home country.

Tojo is often credited with inventing the California roll and the B.C. roll. According to Tojo, when he started in Vancouver, Canadian tastes were not used to traditional sushi, with its raw fish and seaweed wrapper. As a result, Tojo chose to use non-traditional ingredients and to roll the sushi inside-out. Originally called "Tojo-maki", Tojo later changed the name to California roll because of its popularity with visitors from Los Angeles. Tojo's is also known for its omakase, a Japanese term meaning "I'll leave it to you", in which patrons leave the selection of the menu to the chef.

In addition to many newspaper and magazine reviews, Tojo has appeared on numerous television programs, including Martha Stewart Living, Anthony Bourdain: No Reservations, Anna & Kristina's Grocery Bag, Bizarre Foods America, Glutton for Punishment, 1,000 Places to See Before You Die, Simply Ming, and The Today Show. In 2016, the Japanese Ministry of Agriculture, Forestry and Fisheries appointed Tojo as a goodwill ambassador of Japanese cuisine, one of only 13 chefs to share this honour outside Japan.

In 2024 he was the subject of The Chef and the Daruma, a documentary film by Mads K. Baekkevold.

== Awards and honours ==
- Vancouver Magazine - Best Japanese Award (each year since 1988)
- Vancouver Magazine - Lifetime Achievement Award 2009
- British Columbia Restaurants Hall of Fame – 2006
- Zagat - Extraordinary Award 2007 and 2008
- DiRoNA - Achievement of Distinction in Dining 2012
- The Wall Street Journal - One of the Top 10 Sushi Chefs in the World

== See also ==
- List of Canadian inventions and discoveries
