= Ninan Auassat: We, the Children =

2024 Canadian documentary film

- French: Ninan Auassat: Nous, les enfants
- Directed by: Kim O'Bomsawin
- Written by: Kim O'Bomsawin
- Produced by: Mélanie Brière; Nathalie Cloutier; Colette Loumède
- Cinematography: Hugo Gendron
- Edited by: Alexandre Lachance
- Music by: Wyler Wolf
- Production company: National Film Board of Canada
- Release date: October 4, 2024 (VIFF)
- Running time: 93 minutes
- Country: Canada
- Languages: French; English; Innu-aimun; Atikamekw

Ninan Auassat: We, the Children (French: Ninan Auassat: Nous, les enfants) is a Canadian documentary film, directed by Kim O'Bomsawin and released in 2024. The film profiles three groups of First Nations youth from the Atikamekw, Eeyou Cree and Innu nations, sharing their perspectives on their lives by allowing them to speak entirely for themselves.

The film premiered at the 2024 Vancouver International Film Festival, where it won the award for Best Canadian Documentary. It was also screened as the closing film of the 2024 Montreal International Documentary Festival, where it was the winner of the Magnus Isacsson Award.
