= Cat's Cry =

2024 Canadian/Serbian/Croatian drama film directed by Sanja Živković

- Film poster
- Serbian: Mačji krik
- Directed by: Sanja Živković
- Written by: Goran Paskaljević; Đorđe Sibinović
- Produced by: Vladimir Paskaljević; Petar Paskaljević; Munire Armstrong; Irena Škorić
- Starring: Jasmin Geljo
- Cinematography: Milica Drakulić
- Edited by: Radojka Vrabac
- Music by: Dalibor Grubačević
- Production companies: Nova Films; YN Films; Artizana Film
- Release date: October 1, 2024 (VIFF)
- Running time: 94 minutes
- Countries: Serbia; Canada; Croatia
- Language: Serbian

Cat's Cry (Serbian: Mačji krik) is a drama film, directed by Sanja Živković and released in 2024. A coproduction of companies from Serbia, Canada and Croatia, the film stars Jasmin Geljo as Stamen, a man living in a small town in Serbia who must fight for custody of his granddaughter when she is rejected by her mother after being diagnosed with cri du chat syndrome.

The cast also includes Andrijana Đorđević, Sanja Mikitišin, Marija Škaričić, Denis Murić, Sergej Trifunović and Srđan Miletić.

The screenplay was written by influential Serbian filmmaker Goran Paskaljević and collaborator Đorđe Sibinović, with Živković stepping in as director after Paskaljević died before the film entered production. It was shot in fall 2023, in and around the Serbian city of Požarevac.

== Release ==
The film premiered at the 2024 Vancouver International Film Festival, where Živković received an honorable mention for the Emerging Canadian Director award. It was also screened in Open Air Premiere Programme at the 31st Sarajevo Film Festival in August 2025.

== Awards ==
Geljo received a Canadian Screen Award nomination for Best Lead Performance in a Drama Film at the 14th Canadian Screen Awards in 2026.
