= Jules Koostachin =

Cree writer and filmmaker

- Born: Moose Factory
- Alma mater: Toronto Metropolitan University; University of British Columbia; Concordia University
- Occupation: Writer and filmmaker
- Works: NiiSoTeWak: Two Bodies, One Heart, Unearthing Secrets, Gathering Truths
- Children: 4, including Asivak
- Website: juleskoostachin.com

Jules Arita Koostachin is a Cree writer and filmmaker from Canada, most noted for her 2022 film Broken Angel (MaaShwaKan MaNiTo).

== Background ==
A member of the Attawapiskat First Nation, she was born in Moose Factory, Ontario, and grew up in Moosonee, and worked in social services before turning to filmmaking in the early 2010s. She directed a number of short films, both narrative dramas and documentaries, before making Broken Angel as her feature debut.

== Career ==
Broken Angel won the award for Best Film at the 2022 American Indian Film Festival, and was longlisted for the 2022 Jean-Marc Vallée DGC Discovery Award.

Her documentary film WaaPaKe premiered at the 2023 Vancouver International Film Festival, and has been shortlisted for the 2023 DGC Allan King Award for Best Documentary Film. In 2023, she also released the documentary Chubby Cree: PiMahCiHoWin (The Journey) about the Cree hand drum group Chubby Cree.

Angela's Shadow, her second narrative feature film, premiered at the 2024 Vancouver International Film Festival, where it won the Audience Award for the Panorama program.

She has also previously been announced as working on a screenplay adaptation of Richard Wagamese's novel Ragged Company.

As a writer she published the poetry collection Unearthing Secrets, Gathering Truths in 2018, and received a nomination in the English poetry category at the 2019 Indigenous Voices Awards.

She has also had selected roles as an actress, including as Talia Spears in Bones of Crows and as the voice of Layla Mabray in the television series Molly of Denali.

== Personal life ==
Her son, Asivak Koostachin, is an actor. Her twin sons, Pawaken and Tapwewin Koostachin-Chakasim, have had acting roles, notably in their mother's short film MisTik.

She and her family are currently based in Vancouver, British Columbia, where she studied at the University of British Columbia.
