= Cherub (film) =

2024 Canadian comedy-drama film directed by Devin Shears

- Directed by: Devin Shears
- Written by: Devin Shears
- Produced by: Mithila Majithia; Devin Shears
- Starring: Benjamin Turnbull
- Cinematography: Nick Tiringer
- Edited by: Devin Shears
- Music by: Anastasia Westcott
- Production company: York University
- Release date: October 3, 2024 (VIFF)
- Running time: 74 minutes
- Country: Canada
- Language: English

Cherub is a Canadian comedy-drama film, written and directed by Devin Shears and released in 2024. Told almost entirely without dialogue except for two brief lines, the film stars Benjamin Turnbull as Harvey, a shy, lonely and overweight man from Toronto who discovers an opportunity to build new confidence in himself and his body when he learns about the chub subculture in the LGBTQ community, and decides, despite being heterosexual, to submit a photograph of himself to a gay chub magazine's "Cherub of the Month" contest.

The film was made, for a budget of just $10,000, as Shears's master's thesis in the film studies program at York University.

The film premiered at the 2024 Vancouver International Film Festival, and was screened in the National Competition at the 2024 Festival du nouveau cinéma.
