= The Chef and the Daruma =

2024 Canadian documentary film

- Directed by: Mads K. Baekkevold
- Written by: Natalie Murao
- Produced by: Luis Guerra
- Starring: Hidekazu Tojo; Gabriel Prevost-Takahashi
- Cinematography: Kaayla Whachell
- Edited by: Anna Chiyeko Shannon
- Music by: Masahiro Takahashi
- Production company: Wallop Film
- Release date: September 30, 2024 (VIFF)
- Running time: 90 minutes
- Country: Canada
- Languages: English; Japanese

The Chef and the Daruma is a Canadian documentary film, directed by Mads K. Baekkevold and released in 2024. The film is a portrait of Hidekazu Tojo, a Japanese immigrant to Canada who became a prominent chef on the Vancouver restaurant scene and has been credited by some sources as the inventor of California roll, It blends both contemporary documentary footage and dramatic reenactments of scenes from Tojo's early life, with young Tojo performed by actor Gabriel Prevost-Takahashi.

The film premiered at the 2024 Vancouver International Film Festival, where it was the winner of the Audience Award for the Insights program.

The film proved so popular that VIFF had to add two additional screenings during the festival, and seven post-festival screenings at the VIFF Centre through the rest of October. Tojo also introduced a special "The Chef and the Daruma" menu at his restaurant in conjunction with the film.
