= Theresa Traore Dahlberg =

Swedish film director and screenwriter

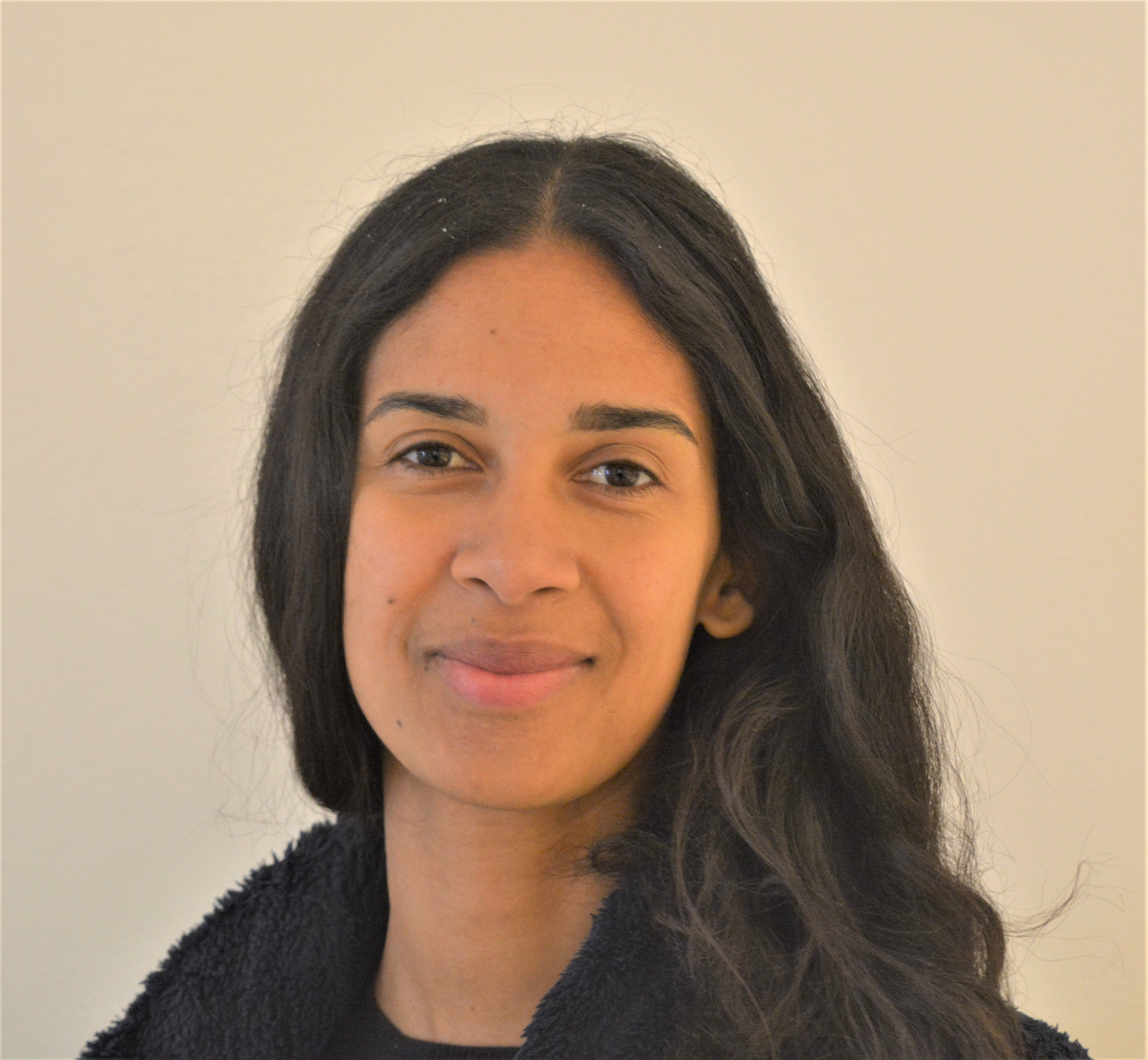
- Dahlberg in 2019
- Born: November 1, 1983 (age 43); Värnamo
- Occupations: Film director, screenwriter
- Years active: 2006-present

Theresa Traore Dahlberg (born 1 November 1983) is a Swedish film director and screenwriter.

== Biography ==
Dahlberg is the daughter of Burkinabé musician Richard Seydou Traore and grew up between Burkina Faso and Öland in Sweden. Her parents worked for the United Nations in development missions in Burkina Faso, and she has three brothers. After graduating from high school, Dahlberg moved to New York and worked a number of jobs, including sales assistant in a candy store, amusement park employee, real estate agent, and photographer's assistant. In 2007, she enrolled at The New School in New York. Dahlberg earned her bachelor's degree from the Stockholm Academy of Dramatic Arts, and her Masters in Fine arts from the Royal Academy of Arts. Her master's project was called "Copper and Cotton".

Dahlberg directed her first short film, Procrastination, in 2006. She created the 30-minute documentary short On Hold in 2009. Afterwards, Dahlberg worked for the Swedish television programs and directed fictional works. In 2011, she directed the short documentary Taxi Sisters, on the topic of female taxi drivers in Senegal. In 2017, Dahlberg directed the feature-length documentary Ouaga Girls. The film examines young women in Burkina Faso who have chosen to take up the typically-male profession of being a car mechanic. It shows their lives in and out of school, and explains the reasons they took the mechanical route - some had teenage pregnancies, while others lost their parents. Ouaga Girls was awarded the CREDIF prize at the Carthage Film Days. Dahlberg directed The Ambassador's Wife in 2018, and it was featured at the Toronto Film Festival. The film received the Tempo Documentary Short Award, and Dahlberg received the Beckers Art Award in 2019.

In addition to filmmaking, Dahlberg is also a sculptor. She participates in so-called solidarity projects with the Tensta Konsthall art gallery in Stockholm.

== Filmography ==
- 2011: Taxi Sister
- 2017: Ouaga Girls
- 2018: The Ambassador´s Wife
- 2021: Microcement
