= So Surreal: Behind the Masks =

- Film poster
- Directed by: Neil Diamond; Joanne Robertson
- Written by: Neil Diamond; Joanne Robertson
- Produced by: Daniel Morin
- Cinematography: Glauco Bermudez; Yoan Cart
- Edited by: Rebecca Lessard
- Music by: Anaïs Larocque
- Production company: Rezolution Pictures
- Distributed by: Serial Maven Studios; Documentary
- Release date: September 5, 2024 (TIFF)
- Running time: 88 minutes
- Country: Canada
- Language: English

So Surreal: Behind the Masks is a 2024 Canadian documentary film, directed by Neil Diamond and Joanne Robertson. The film is an exploration of the influence of traditional indigenous masks on artistic surrealism.

The film premiered at the 2024 Toronto International Film Festival.
