= Live-In Caregiver Program =

The Live-In Caregiver Program (LCP, French: Programme des aides familiaux résidants) was an immigration program offered and administered by the government of Canada and was the primary means by which foreign caregivers could come to Canada as eldercare, special needs, and childcare providers. The program ended on November 30, 2014, and a regular work permit has been needed since then.

While such services were offered by Canadian citizens or foreign immigrants with permanent residence (PR) status, government provisions for a room and board deduction as well as a basic rate of pay that frequently total provincial minimum wage standard allowed for the program to be more affordable for many families. Caregivers who came to Canada through the program are eligible to apply for PR status after working a minimum of two years within four years of their arrival (plus 3 months). For many who would not otherwise qualify for PR status under any other category, this was one of the motivations for participation.

Standard qualifications were regulated federally, though conditions of employment were determined at a provincial level. Requirements included a minimum of 6 months of training or 1 year of compatible employment within the last 3 years—though various exceptions and additional stipulations do apply. Such regulations and complicating bureaucratic procedures are the driving force behind the creation of Live-In Caregiver (or Nanny) placement agencies, who act as a mediator between families, caregivers, and the government—providing support for documentation and advice on the program.

In 2014, the Government of Canada conducted a Gender-based Analysis Plus (GBA+) report on the Live-in Caregiver program. This analysis led the government to identify issues in the program relating to the requirement that caregivers needed to maintain residency at the same address where they were employed. The 2020 Annual Report to Parliament by the Minister of Immigration, Refugees and Citizenship indicates that employees were subject to exploitation, abuse and isolation from their families as a result of this residency requirement.

The Live-in Caregiver program stopped accepting applications in 2014 due to a significant processing backlog of 27,000 applications. The government subsequently launched two pilot programs: Caring for Children Class and Caring for People with High Medical Needs. These programs ended the accommodation requirement, a major critique of the previous program. Following additional consultations, the government relaunched these programs in 2019, under the titles of Home Child Care Provider Pilot and the Home Support Worker Pilot. These pilots will run for five years. The relaunch of these programs brought a few important changes from the previous pilots launched in 2014. Firstly, they aim to provide a clearer pathway from temporary resident status to permanent resident status. Additionally, these new programs provide open-work permits for spouses and study permits for dependent children, allowing families to move together. Lastly, the caregiving work permits are now occupation-specific rather than employer-specific, allowing employees to quickly transition to a different employer if necessary.

== Criticism ==
=== Contractual violations ===
A 2008 study by the Filipino Women's Organization PINAY Quebec and the McGill University School of Social Work found that only 22.1% of employers always respected the contract, and that 25% signed no contract at all. Further contractual violations included: 34% of participants reporting denial of fair pay for unpaid childcare wages; 43% reporting having provided unpaid overtime; and 30% reporting having made purchases for the job with personal finances. Participants also reported that they did not receive pay increases in adherence with minimum wage increases, and 75% reported not being paid on time.

=== Labour violations ===
Critics have highlighted that the requirement that caregivers live with their employers leaves more opportunities for misconduct, as caregivers are constantly accessible and able to work long hours without a break. Additionally, caregivers are often not afforded privacy within their employers homes, often being denied independent living spaces. This lack of privacy leads to isolation from the broader community and isolation from the caregiver's family. Due to the lack of regulatory oversight, violations by employers often have gone without recourse. Additionally, caregivers often lack the English language skills or legal knowledge to articulate and report these violations. Research shows that many caregivers also avoid reporting abuse due to fears that losing their job would jeopardize their ability to qualify for permanent residency, creating a structural dependency that heightens workers' vulnerability to exploitation by their employers.

=== Educational criticisms ===
Another issue has been the deskilling of caregivers, who are required to have a grade 12 education (or acceptable equivalent) and domestic service training. Often, these workers have a university education or training as registered nurses, making them overqualified for the jobs they are performing. Furthermore, caregiver responsibilities under the program often do not encourage the development of additional skills that could provide upward mobility within the national workforce. As such, the labour potential of caregivers is largely under-utilized.

=== Racial and gender-based inequities ===
Scholars have criticized the program for perpetuating a racist devaluation of the women who immigrate to Canada to work in the caregiving industry. According to this argument, migrant women come to participate in the workforce under the pretence of economic opportunity, but are not granted citizenship rights until they have been working for at least two years. Scholars have characterized the program as exploitative based on its recruitment of migrant women to perform difficult jobs, while not putting adequate oversight and accountability measures in place. Other critics argue that the program furthers existing racial stereotypes against Filipina women as being nurturing and loving, yet simultaneously "uncivilized" and lesser than.

Critics contended that as a means of boosting immigration to Canada, the program failed to attract caregivers from a diverse pool of countries. For example, the Philippine nanny is often improperly stereotyped as the program's main market for applicants. While there may be a large and functional industry in the Philippines to produce qualified applicants, individuals from nearly every nation can qualify. Some caregiver placement agencies are substantially broader through their international advertising and the use of immigration legal services.

=== Impact on families ===
Mama (Inay), a 2024 documentary film by Thea Loo, explores the impact of women's participation in the program on their children who were left behind in the Philippines.
