= Sanja Živković =

Serbian-Canadian film director

Sanja Živković is a Serbian-Canadian film director, whose debut feature film Easy Land was released in 2019.

Born in Serbia, she moved to Vancouver, British Columbia, with her family during the Yugoslav Wars. She studied film at Simon Fraser University, and has stated that her experience as an immigrant, living as an outsider in an unfamiliar new society, has informed her creative perspective.

She made several short films, including How I Almost Became a Canadian (2009), Our Little Secret (2011), Maria's Episode (2014) and Cleo (2016), prior to Easy Land, which premiered at the 2019 Toronto International Film Festival.

Her second feature film, Cat's Cry, went into production in 2023. It premiered at the 2024 Vancouver International Film Festival, where Živković received an honorable mention for the Emerging Canadian Director award.
