= Curl Power =

2024 Canadian documentary film

- Directed by: Josephine Anderson
- Written by: Josephine Anderson
- Produced by: Mike Johnston
- Cinematography: Claire Sanford; Ben Cox
- Edited by: Alex Bohs
- Music by: Jesse Zubot; Josh Zubot; Danica Bansie
- Production companies: Secret Bench Films; Studio 104 Entertainment
- Distributed by: Sherry Media Group
- Release date: April 28, 2024 (Hot Docs)
- Running time: 85 minutes
- Country: Canada
- Language: English

Curl Power is a Canadian documentary film, directed by Josephine Anderson and released in 2024. The film profiles the 4KGirl$, a group of teenage girls from Maple Ridge, British Columbia, who are training as a curling team with the goal of competing in the Canadian Junior Curling Championships.

The film premiered at the 2024 Hot Docs Canadian International Documentary Festival.
