= Gillian McKercher =

Canadian film director

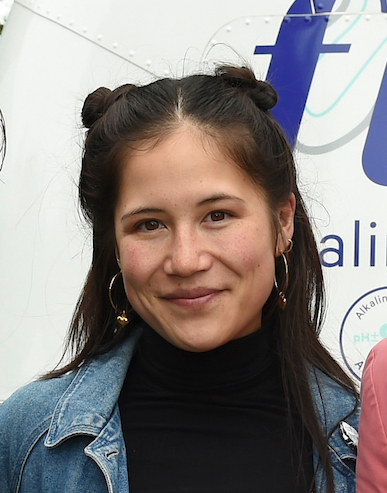

Gillian McKercher is a Canadian film director and producer, whose debut feature film Circle of Steel was released in 2018.

== Career ==
McKercher produced and directed Circle of Steel, which is a dark comedy about the safety culture of the oil and gas industry. The film was shot in Alberta, Canada, and was one of six productions to receive a government grant. Circle of Steel premiered at the Calgary International Film Festival in September 2018.

Her second feature film, Lucky Star, premiered as the closing film of the 2024 Calgary International Film Festival. It had originally also been announced for the 2024 Cinéfest Sudbury International Film Festival, but was subsequently withdrawn from that festival by its distributor so that the screening in Calgary, McKercher's hometown, would be the world premiere.

A graduate of the Director's Lab at the Canadian Film Centre, she was co-founder with Guillaume Carlier and Nicola Waugh of Kino Sum Productions.

Her third feature film, A Dickens of a Christmas, is slated to premiere at the 2025 Calgary International Film Festival.

Another film, Scar Tissue, is in development.
