= Asivak Koostachin =

Canadian actor (born 1994)

Asivak Koostachin (born June 25, 1994) is a Cree-Inuk actor from Canada, most noted for his performances in the films Red Snow and Run Woman Run.

== Career ==
The son of filmmaker Jules Arita Koostachin, he had his first major acting role in the APTN drama series AskiBoyz. In 2018, he had a stage role in Theatre for Living's collective play šxʷʔa'ət (home).

Red Snow, his first leading role in a feature film, was released in 2019. He received a Leo Award nomination for Best Lead Performance by a Male in a Motion Picture, and a nomination for Best Actor at the 2019 American Indian Film Festival.

In 2021, Koostachin appeared in Run Woman Run as the ghost of Tom Longboat. He received a second nomination for Best Actor at the 2021 American Indian Film Festival, and won the Remi Award for Best Actor at the 2021 WorldFest-Houston International Film Festival. He won the award for Best Supporting Actor at the 2021 American Indian Film Festival for his performance in Portraits from a Fire.

Koostachin has also appeared in the films Montana Story, Broken Angel, Angela's Shadow, and Ancestral Beasts, and has had supporting or guest roles in the television series Letterkenny, Cardinal, Hudson & Rex, and Molly of Denali.

He was a main cast member on the HBO Max series Duster.
