= Mama (2024 film) =

2024 Canadian documentary film

- Tagalog: Inay
- Directed by: Thea Loo
- Produced by: Thea Loo; Natalie Murao
- Cinematography: Jeremiah Reyes; Christian Yves Jones
- Edited by: Anna Chiyeko Shannon
- Music by: Moses Caliboso; Jeremiah Reyes
- Production companies: No More Productions; Silent Tower
- Distributed by: Knowledge Network
- Release date: August 4, 2024 (AAIFF)
- Running time: 56 minutes
- Country: Canada
- Languages: English; Kapampangan

Mama (Tagalog: Inay) is a 2024 Canadian documentary film, directed by Thea Loo. The film profiles the phenomenon of Filipina women who came to Canada under the Live-In Caregiver Program to support their families, focusing in particular on its impact on their children who were left behind in the Philippines.

It centres principally on the stories of Jeremiah Reyes, Loo's husband and one of the film's cinematographers, and Shirley Lagman, whose mothers were both participants in the program and were thus separated from their children for many years.

The film premiered at the 2024 Asian American International Film Festival, and had its Canadian premiere at the 2024 Vancouver International Film Festival. It is slated for television broadcast on Knowledge Network in 2025.

== Awards ==
At VIFF, the film won the award for Best British Columbia Film, and received an honorable mention from the Best Canadian Documentary award jury.
