= Vancouver Film Critics Circle Awards 2024 =

Canadian film awards presented in 2025

25th VFCC Awards

February 18, 2025

Best International Picture:
Anora

Best Canadian Picture:
My Old Ass

The 25th Vancouver Film Critics Circle Awards were presented on February 18, 2025, to honour the films selected by the Vancouver Film Critics Circle as the best of 2024.

The nominations were announced on January 20, 2025; the organization limited their number of nominees per category to three. For the international categories, Anora led the nominees with five, followed by The Brutalist, A Complete Unknown and A Real Pain with three nominations each. In the Canadian focused categories, Can I Get a Witness? led with eight nominations, followed by My Old Ass with seven.

Anora and A Real Pain won the most international awards with two each; the former won Best Picture. Can I Get a Witness? won the most Canadian awards with five, though My Old Ass won Best Picture.

== Winners and nominees ==
=== International ===
Best Picture	Best Director
Anora; The Brutalist; A Real Pain	Denis Villeneuve – Dune: Part Two; Sean Baker – Anora; RaMell Ross – Nickel Boys
Best Male Actor	Best Female Actor
Timothée Chalamet – A Complete Unknown as Bob Dylan; Adrien Brody – The Brutalist as László Tóth; Colman Domingo – Sing Sing as John "Divine G" Whitfield	Mikey Madison – Anora as Anora "Ani" Mikheeva; Demi Moore – The Substance as Elisabeth Sparkle; Saoirse Ronan – The Outrun as Rona
Best Supporting Male Actor	Best Supporting Female Actor
Kieran Culkin – A Real Pain as Benji Kaplan; Yura Borisov – Anora as Igor; Edward Norton – A Complete Unknown as Pete Seeger	Margaret Qualley – The Substance as Sue; Monica Barbaro – A Complete Unknown as Joan Baez; Zoe Saldaña – Emilia Pérez as Rita Mora Castro
Best Screenplay	Best Documentary
Jesse Eisenberg – A Real Pain; Sean Baker – Anora; Brady Corbet and Mona Fastvold – The Brutalist	No Other Land – Basel Adra, Hamdan Ballal, Yuval Abraham, and Rachel Szor; Super/Man: The Christopher Reeve Story – Ian Bonhôte and Peter Ettedgui; Will & Harper – Josh Greenbaum
Best International Film in Non-English Language
Flow – Gints Zilbalodis; All We Imagine as Light – Payal Kapadia; Emilia Pérez – Jacques Audiard

=== Canadian ===
Best Picture	Best Director
My Old Ass; 40 Acres; Can I Get a Witness?; Rumours	Ann Marie Fleming – Can I Get a Witness?; Megan Park – My Old Ass; R. T. Thorne – 40 Acres
Best Male Actor	Best Female Actor
Matt Johnson – Matt and Mara as Matt; Roy Dupuis – Rumours as Maxime Laplace; Jae-Hyun Kim – Mongrels as Sonny	Maisy Stella – My Old Ass as Elliott LaBrant; Deragh Campbell – Matt and Mara as Mara; Amy Forsyth – Inedia as Cora; Keira Jang – Can I Get a Witness? as Kiah
Best Supporting Male Actor	Best Supporting Female Actor
Patrick J. Adams – Young Werther as Albert; Kataem O'Connor – 40 Acres as Emanuel Freeman; Percy Hynes White – My Old Ass as Chad	Sandra Oh – Can I Get a Witness? as Ellie; Alison Pill – Young Werther as Charlotte; Aubrey Plaza – My Old Ass as older Elliott LaBrant
Best Screenplay	Best Canadian Documentary
Megan Park – My Old Ass; Ann Marie Fleming – Can I Get a Witness?; Matthew Rankin – Universal Language	Sugarcane – Julian Brave NoiseCat and Emily Kassie; Any Other Way: The Jackie Shane Story – Michael Mabbott and Lucah Rosenberg-Lee; Ari's Theme – Nathan Drillot and Jeff Lee Petry; Blue Rodeo: Lost Together – Dale Heslip; The Movie Man – Matt Finlin
Best BC Film	Best BC Director
Can I Get a Witness?; Ari's Theme; The Chef and the Daruma	Ann Marie Fleming – Can I Get a Witness?; Liz Cairns – Inedia; Jerome Yoo – Mongrels
One to Watch
Keira Jang – Can I Get a Witness?; Megan Park – My Old Ass; Jerome Yoo – Mongrels
