= Vancouver Film Critics Circle Awards 2025 =

Canadian film awards presented in 2026

26th VFCC Awards

February 23, 2026

Best International Picture:
One Battle After Another

Best Canadian Picture:
Nirvanna the Band the Show the Movie

The 26th Vancouver Film Critics Circle Awards were presented on February 23, 2026, to honour the films selected by the Vancouver Film Critics Circle as the best of 2025.

The nominations were announced on January 20, 2026. For the international categories, One Battle After Another led the nominees with seven, followed by Hamnet and Sentimental Value with four each. For the Canadian focused categories, Mile End Kicks led with seven nominations, followed by Nirvanna the Band the Show the Movie with five.

== Winners and nominees ==
=== International ===
Best Picture	Best Director
One Battle After Another; Hamnet; Marty Supreme	Ryan Coogler – Sinners; Paul Thomas Anderson – One Battle After Another; Chloé Zhao – Hamnet
Best Male Actor	Best Female Actor
Timothée Chalamet – Marty Supreme as Marty Mauser; Leonardo DiCaprio – One Battle After Another as Bob Ferguson; Joel Edgerton – Train Dreams as Robert Grainier	Jessie Buckley – Hamnet as Agnes Shakespeare; Rose Byrne – If I Had Legs I'd Kick You as Linda; Renate Reinsve – Sentimental Value as Nora Borg
Best Supporting Male Actor	Best Supporting Female Actor
Sean Penn – One Battle After Another as Col. Steven J. Lockjaw; Benicio del Toro – One Battle After Another as Sensei Sergio St. Carlos; Stellan Skarsgård – Sentimental Value as Gustav Borg	Amy Madigan – Weapons as Gladys; Elle Fanning – Sentimental Value as Rachel Kemp; Teyana Taylor – One Battle After Another as Perfidia Beverly Hills
Best Screenplay	Best Documentary
Ryan Coogler – Sinners; Paul Thomas Anderson – One Battle After Another; Chloé Zhao and Maggie O'Farrell – Hamnet	The Perfect Neighbor; Come See Me in the Good Light; Cover-Up
Best International Film in Non-English Language
It Was Just an Accident; The Secret Agent; Sentimental Value

=== Canadian ===
Best Picture	Best Director
Nirvanna the Band the Show the Movie; Mile End Kicks; Wrong Husband (Uiksaringitara)	Matt Johnson – Nirvanna the Band the Show the Movie; Zacharias Kunuk – Wrong Husband (Uiksaringitara); Chandler Levack – Mile End Kicks
Best Male Actor	Best Female Actor
Matt Johnson – Nirvanna the Band the Show the Movie as Matt; Michael Greyeyes – Meadowlarks; Leo Woodall – Tuner as Niki White	Tatiana Maslany – Keeper as Liz; Barbie Ferreira – Mile End Kicks as Grace Pine; Iringó Réti – Blue Heron as Mother
Best Supporting Male Actor	Best Supporting Female Actor
Devon Bostick – Mile End Kicks; Jay McCarrol – Nirvanna the Band the Show the Movie as Jay; Stanley Simons – Mile End Kicks	Alex Rice – Meadowlarks; Juliette Gariépy – Mile End Kicks; Michelle Thrush – Meadowlarks
Best Screenplay	Best Canadian Documentary
Daniel Roher and Robert Ramsey – Tuner; Matt Johnson and Jay McCarrol – Nirvanna the Band the Show the Movie; Chandler Levack – Mile End Kicks	Modern Whore; Forward; Lunatic: The Luna Vachon Story
Best BC Film	Best BC Director
Foreigner; Blue Heron; Forward	Nic Collar – Forward; Tasha Hubbard – Meadowlarks; Sophy Romvari – Blue Heron; Ava Maria Safai – Foreigner
One to Watch
Sophy Romvari – Blue Heron; Nicole Bazuin – Modern Whore; Jay Drakulic, Mallory Drumm, and Alex Lee Williams – Dream Eater
