= 39th Santa Barbara International Film Festival =

2024 edition of SBIFF

- Official poster
- Opening film: Madu by Matthew Ogens and Joel Kachi Benson
- Closing film: Chosen Family by Heather Graham
- Location: Santa Barbara, California, United States
- Founded: 1986
- Awards: Kirk Douglas Award: Ryan Gosling; Maltin Modern Master Award: Robert Downey Jr.
- Hosted by: Santa Barbara International Film Festival (organization)
- No. of films: 183
- Festival date: Opening: 7 February 2024; Closing: 17 February 2024
- Website: SBIFF

Santa Barbara International Film Festival
- 2025 2023

The 39th Santa Barbara International Film Festival, is the 2024 edition of the Santa Barbara International Film Festival, which took place from February 7 to February 17, 2024, at Santa Barbara, California, United States.

In November and December, honorary awards were announced which are: Outstanding Performer of the Year Award for Bradley Cooper; Kirk Douglas Award For Excellence In Film for Ryan Gosling and Virtuosos Award for Lily Gladstone, Da'Vine Joy Randolph, Greta Lee, Charles Melton, Danielle Brooks, Colman Domingo, America Ferrera, and Andrew Scott.

The festival opened with the documentary Madu by Matthew Ogens and Joel Kachi Benson, story of a 12-year-old Nigerian boy Anthony Madu who moves to England to study ballet at a prestigious dance school. This year the festival inaugurated a new award 'Arlington Award', named for the historic venue where all the fest’s annual tributes timed to Oscar season take place. The award honors "an artist who is greatly admired and who has demonstrated an incomparable commitment to film and its craft". Annette Bening is the first recipient of the award.

The festival closed on February 17, with Chosen Family by Heather Graham, story of a yoga teacher Ann who is trying to find inner peace despite having problems in life. In total the festival showcased 45 world premieres and 77 US premieres altogether from 48 countries, with approximately 100 thousand attendees during the week slatted with screenings of over 200+ films. The winners were announced at a ceremony in Santa Barbara.

== Official selection ==
=== Opening and closing films ===
English title	Original title	Director(s)	Production countrie(s)
Opening film
Madu		Matthew Ogens and Joel Kachi Benson	United States, Nigeria, United Kingdom
Closing film
Chosen Family		Heather Graham	United States

=== World Premiere Feature Films ===
English title	Original title	Director(s)	Production countrie(s)
76 Days		Joe Wein	United States
Alien Contact		Rick Rosenthal	United States
Art and Life: The Story of Jim Phillips		John Edward Makens	United States
Books & Drinks		Geoffrey Cowper	Dominican Republic
Chosen Family		Heather Graham	United States
Dandelions		Basil Mironer	United States
Diving into the Darkness		Nays Baghai	Australia
Electra		Hala Matar	Bahrain
The Fight for Black Lives		Micere Keels	United States
Giants Rising		Lisa Landers	United States
God & Country		Dan Partland	United States
Lili		Sylwia Rosak	Poland
The Long Game		Jace Anderson	United States
Madu		Matthew Ogens and Joel Kachi Benson	United States, Nigeria, United Kingdom
The Movie Man		Matt Finlin	Canada
Okie		Kate Cobb	United States
Running for the Mountains		Babette Hogan, Julie Eisenberg	United States
Send Kelp!		Blake McWilliam	Canada
Veselka		Michael Fiore	United States

=== US Premiere Feature Films ===
English title	Original title	Director(s)	Production countrie(s)
Achilles		Farhad Delaram	Iran, France, Germany
Andragogy	Budi Pekerti	Wregas Bhanuteja	Indonesia
Atikamekw Suns	Soleils Atikamekw	Chloé Leriche	Canada
The Ballad of a Hustler		Heitor Dhalia	United States, Brazil
Before It Ends	Når befrielsen kommer	Anders Walter	Denmark
Birthday Girl		Michael Noer	Denmark
The Blue Star	La estrella azul	Javier Macipe	Spain, Argentina
Cinema Laika		Veljko Vidak	France, Finland
Cold	Kuldi	Erlingur Thoroddsen	Iceland
Cold Sigh		Nahid Azizi Sedigh	Iran
Coup!		Austin Stark, Joseph Schuman	United States
Crush: Message in a Bottle		Maya Gallus	Canada
Dance First		James Marsh	United Kingdom
Days of Happiness	Les jours heureux	Chloé Robichaud	Canada
Dear Jassi		Tarsem Singh	India, Canada, United States
Disconnect Me		Alex Lykos	Australia
Edge of Everything		Sophia Sabella, Pablo Feldman	United States
El paraiso		Enrico Maria Artale	Italy
Estonia		Måns Månsson, Juuso Syrjä	Finland, Sweden, Belgium, Estonia
Excursion	Ekskurzija	Una Gunjak	Bosnia and Herzegovina, Croatia, Serbia, France, Norway, Qatar
French Girl		James A. Woods, Nicolas Wright	Canada
Good Savage		Santiago Mohar Volkow	Mexico
Green Night		Han Shuai	Hong Kong
Hoard		Luna Carmoon	United Kingdom
Homecoming	Máhccan	Suvi West, Anssi Kömi	Finland, Norway
I'm Just Here for the Riot		Asia Youngman, Kathleen Jayme	Canada
The King Tide		Christian Sparkes	Canada
The Last Daughter		Brenda Matthews, Nathaniel Schmidt	Australia
The Last Movie		Olaug Spissøy Kyvik	Norway
Let Me Go	Laissez-moi	Maxime Rappaz	Switzerland
Medium		Christina Ioakeimidi	Greece
Mimang	미망	Kim Tae-yang	South Korea
The Movie Teller	La contadora de películas	Lone Scherfig	Spain, France, Chile
Mr. Freeman		Mads Matthiesen	Denmark
Much Ado About Dying		Simon Chambers	Ireland
On Earth as in Heaven	Sur la terre comme au ciel	Nathalie Saint-Pierre	Canada
On the Edge	État limite	Nicolas Peduzzi	France
The Other Son	El otro hijo	Juan Sebastián Quebrada	Colombia, France, Argentina
Over the Cracks	Sous le tapis	Camille Japy	France
Photophobia		Ivan Ostrochovský, Pavel Pekarčík	Slovakia, Czech Republic, Ukraine
Point of Change		Rebecca Coley	United Kingdom, United States, Australia and Indonesia
Prison in the Andes	Penal Cordillera	Felipe Carmona	Chile, Brazil
Queen of Bones		Robert Budreau	United States, Canada
A Ravaging Wind		Paula Hernández	Argentina, Uruguay
The Reeds		Cemil Ağacıkoğlu	Turkey
Rickerl		Adrian Goiginger	Austria, Germany
The Rooster		Mark Leonard Winter	Australia
Seagrass		Meredith Hama-Brown	Canada
Snow Leopard	雪豹	Pema Tseden	China
Suze		Linsey Stewart, Dane Clark	Canada
That They May Face the Rising Sun		Pat Collins	Ireland
The Tundra Within Me	Eallogierdu	Sara Margrethe Oskal	Norway
Unmoored		Caroline Ingvarsson	United Kingdom
Until the Music Is Over	Até que a Música Pare	Cristiane Oliveira	Brazil, Italy
Uproar		Paul Middleditch, Hamish Bennett	New Zealand
The Vourdalak		Adrien Beau	France

=== Non Premiere Feature Films ===
English title	Original title	Director(s)	Production countrie(s)
Abroad	어브로드	Giovanni Fumu	South Korea, United States
All You Hear is Noise		Ned Castle, Matt Day	United States
Another Happy Day		Nora Fiffer	United States
Ashima		Kenji Tsukamoto	United States
Blaga's Lessons	Уроците на Блага	Stephan Komandarev	Bulgaria
Brothers	Bratři	Tomáš Mašín	Czech Republic, Germany, Slovakia
Bye Bye Tiberias		Lina Soualem	France, Palestine, Belgium, Qatar
City of Wind	Sèr sèr salhi	Lkhagvadulam Purev-Ochir	Mongolia, Portugal, Netherlands, Germany, Qatar, France
The Contestant		Clair Titley	United Kingdom
Copa 71		Rachel Ramsay, James Erskine	United Kingdom
The Cowboy and the Queen		Andrea Nevins	United States
Eat Bitter		Pascale Appora-Gnekindy, Ningyi Sun	Central African Republic, China
Ezra		Tony Goldwyn	United States
First Time Female Director		Chelsea Peretti	United States
First We Bombed New Mexico		Lois Lipman	United States
Fresh Kills		Jennifer Esposito	United States
A Happy Day		Hisham Zaman	Norway
I’ll Be Right There		Brendan Walsh	United States
In the Rearview		Maciek Hamela	Poland, France, Ukraine
Joika		James Napier Robertson	New Zealand, Poland
La Extorsión		Martino Zaidelis	Argentina, USA
Limbo		Ivan Sen	Australia
A Look Through His Lens		Matthew Berkowitz, Gregory Hoblit	United States, France, Ireland, United Kingdom
Lucha: A Wrestling Tale		Marco Ricci	United States
Mourning in Lod		Hilla Medalia	United States
One Life		James Hawes	United Kingdom
Pet Shop Days		Olmo Schnabel	United States, Italy, United Kingdom, Mexico
Seven Blessings		Ayelet Menahemi	Israel
Shari & Lamb Chop		Lisa D’Apolito	United States
Show Her the Money		Ky Dickens	United States
Sira		Apolline Traoré	Burkina Faso, Senegal, France, Germany
Solitude	Einvera	Ninna Pálmadóttir	Iceland, Slovakia, France
Sorry/Not Sorry		Caroline Suh, Cara Mones	United States
The Taste of Things		Trần Anh Hùng	France
Thank You Very Much		Alex Braverman	United States
TransMexico		Claudia Sanchez	United States
We Are Guardians		Edivan Guajajara, Chelsea Greene, Rob Grobman	United States, Brazil
We Grown Now		Minhal Baig	United States
Wicked Little Letters		Thea Sharrock	United Kingdom
Without Air		Katalin Moldovai	Hungary

=== 2024 SBIFF Short Films ===
English title	Original title	Director(s)	Production countrie(s)
72		Marissa Chibás	United States
841		Rachel Burnett	United States
The ABCs of Book Banning		Sheila Nevins	United States
Above & Within		Patrick Hall	United States
Alarms	Apnées	Nicolas Panay	France
And Now I Lay Me Down		Rani DeMuth	United States
Area Boy		Iggy London	United Kingdom
The Ballad of Tita and the Machines		Miguel Angel Caballero	United States
Basri & Salma in a Never-Ending Comedy	Basri & Salma dalam Komedi yang Terus Berputar	Khozy Rizal	Indonesia, United States
A Bird Called Memory	Pássaro Memória	Leonardo Martinelli	Brazil, United Kingdom
The Birthday Party	Il compleanno di Enrico	Francesco Sossai	Germany, France, Italy
A Body Called Life		Spencer MacDonald	United States
Boo		Genevieve Aniello	United States
Breaking Silence		Amy Bench, Annie Silverstein	United States
The Breakthrough		Daniel Sinclair	United States
Dammi		Yann Mounir Demange	France, United Kingdom
Dog Apartment	Koerkorter	Priit Tender	Estonia
Don’t Cry, Gabriel	Pleure pas Gabriel	Mathilde Chavanne	France
Jane Austen's Period Drama		Julia Aks, Steve Pinder	United States

== Awards ==
Sources

- Audience Choice Award: TransMexico by Claudia Sanchez
- Panavision Spirit Award for Independent Cinema: Edge of Everything by Sophia Sabella and Pablo Feldman
- Jeffrey C. Barbakow Award – Best International Feature Film: Andragogy by Wregas Bhanuteja
- Best Documentary Award: Diving Into the Darkness by Nays Baghai
- Nueva Vision Award for Spain/Latin America Cinema: The Blue Star (La estrella azul) by Javier Macipe
- Best Nordic Film Award: Before It Ends (Når Befrielsen Kommer) by Anders Walter
- Social Justice Award for Documentary Film: The Last Daughter by Brenda Matthews and Nathaniel Schmidt
- The ASC Award for Cinematography: The Movie Teller by Lone Scherfig
- ADL Stand Up Award: The Last Daughter by Brenda Matthews and Nathaniel Schmidt
- Best Documentary Short Film Award: A Man’s Man by Myles Desenberg
- Bruce Corwin Award – Best Live-Action Short Film Area Boy by Iggy London
- Bruce Corwin Award – Best Animated Short Film On the 8th Day (Au 8ème Jour) by Agathe Sénéchal, Alicia Massez, Elise Debruyne, Flavie Carin and Théo Duhautois
- Kirk Douglas Award For Excellence In Film: Ryan Gosling
- Maltin Modern Master Award: Robert Downey Jr.
- Montecito Award: Jeffrey Wright
- Outstanding Performer(s) of the Year Award: Bradley Cooper for Maestro
- The American Riviera Award: Mark Ruffalo
- Cinema Vanguard Award: Paul Giamatti
- Arlington Award: Annette Bening
- Outstanding Directors of the Year:
  - Martin Scorsese, Killers of the Flower Moon
  - Justine Triet, Anatomy of a Fall
- Virtuosos Award:
  - Danielle Brooks – The Color Purple
  - Colman Domingo – Rustin and The Color Purple
  - America Ferrera – Barbie
  - Lily Gladstone – Killers of the Flower Moon
  - Greta Lee – Past Lives
  - Charles Melton – May December
  - Da'Vine Joy Randolph – The Holdovers
  - Andrew Scott – All of Us Strangers
- Variety Artisans Award:
  - Billie Eilish and Finneas O'Connell – Songwriter – Barbie
  - Stephane Ceretti – VFX – Guardians of the Galaxy Vol. 3
  - Ludwig Göransson – Composer – Oppenheimer
  - Sarah Greenwood and Katie Spencer – Production Designer – Barbie
  - Kazu Hiro – Hairstyling/Makeup – Maestro
  - Jennifer Lame – Editor – Oppenheimer
  - Rodrigo Prieto – Cinematography – Killers of the Flower Moon
  - Michael Semanick – Re-recording Mixer – Spider-Man: Across the Spider-Verse
  - Holly Waddington – Costume Designer – Poor Things
