= 29th Fantasia International Film Festival =

2025 edition of film festival

- Official poster
- Opening film: Eddington, by Ari Aster
- Closing film: Fixed, by Genndy Tartakovsky
- Location: Montreal, Quebec, Canada
- Founded: 1996
- Hosted by: Festival Fantasia Inc
- Artistic director: Mitch Davis
- Festival date: Opening: 16 July 2025; Closing: 3 August 2025
- Language: International
- Website: Fantasia 2025

Fantasia International Film Festival
- 30th 28th

The 29th Fantasia International Film Festival opened on July 16 in Montreal, Quebec, Canada, with American neo-Western black comedy film Eddington, by Ari Aster. The Canadian Trailblazer Award was presented to Hungarian-born Canadian filmmaker George Mihalka, the director of the 1981 slasher film My Bloody Valentine, and Sheila McCarthy, Canadian actress and singer during festival.

Pascal Plante, a Canadian film director and screenwriter served as jury president for Compétition Cheval Noir. The seven of the competition’s eight categories awards were announced on July 26, with the jury awarding Mother of Flies, a horror–fantasy film by John Adams, Zelda Adams, and Toby Posner, with the Cheval Noir Award for Best Film, marking the first time a United States production has received this award.

The festival closed on August 3, 2025 with dog sex adult comedy Fixed, by Russian-American animator, producer–director, Genndy Tartakovsky, who was also honored with 'Cheval Noir Career Achievement Award' along with Danny Elfman, American film composer, and musician. In the Audience Awards announced on August 5, 2025, Best International Feature Gold was awarded to 2025 French film Flush, a thriller comedy by Grégory Morin.

== Juries ==
=== Compétition Cheval Noir ===
- Pascal Plante, Canadian film director and screenwriter – Jury President
- Ethan Eng, Canadian filmmaker
- Alison Foreman, Journalist, features writer at IndieWire
- Payton McCarty-Simas, freelance writer, artist, and editor based in New York City
- George Schmalz, Vice President, Theatrical Distribution and New Business Development at Kino Lorber

=== New Flesh Competition for Best First Feature ===
- Chris Nash, writer, director, and prosthetics effects artist from Sault Ste. Marie, Ontario – Jury President
- Jim Brunzell, director of festivals, Dark Star Pictures
- Louise Buckler, head of marketing Arrow Films
- Deirdre Crimmins, film critic and programmer
- Anelle Deghani, The Coven sales agent
- Jean-François Leblanc, filmmaker

=== International Short Film Competition ===
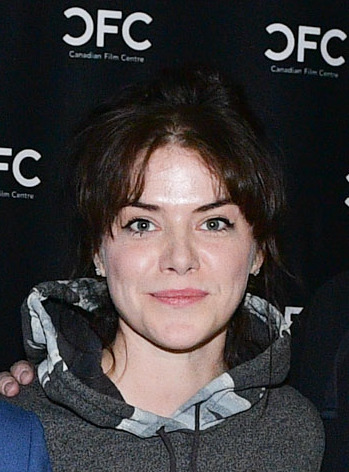
Kaniehtiio Horn, Jury President for the short film competition

- Kaniehtiio Horn, Canadian actress and filmmaker – Jury President
- Rémi Fréchette, Director, Screenwriter, Editor
- Evan O’Brien, Junior Executive, NEON
- Carol Nguyen, Vietnamese Canadian filmmaker
- Wylie Rush, Director, Screenwriter

=== Satoshi Kon Award for Excellence in Animation ===
- Rachel Samson, an animation filmmaker and programmer from Quebec City – Jury President
- Sam Chou Animation Director and Showrunner
- Chimwemwe Miller, Voice Actor

=== Director's Guild of Canada Award for Best Feature Director ===
- Elza Kephart, Canadian filmmaker, from Montreal, Quebe – Jury President
- Cam Maitland, Film and Content Specialist, Hollywood Suite
- Alanna Thain, Professor of Cinema and Cultural Studies, McGill University
- Joe Lipsett, Freelance Film and Television Critic
- Olivia Norquay, Film Programmer, Dave Barber Cinematheque

=== Poulain Noir ===
- Ginette Petit, Producer – Jury President
- Bryan Perro, Québec author of the children's fantasy fiction series Amos Daragon
- Luc Chamberland, Director, Screenwriter and Teacher
- Alex Parkinson, Associate Director and Feature Animation VFX Supervisor at Cinesite

=== Jury AQCC – Camera Lucida ===
- Miguel de Plante, film critic, editor, director
- Louis-Paul Rioux, Mediafilm Senior Collaborator
- Elijah Baron, Film Critic, AQCC Vice-President

=== L'écran Fantastique Jury ===
- Yves Rivard, French-Canadian film critic

=== Jury of the Fantastic Weekends of Quebec Cinema ===
- JP Bergeron, Actor, Director
- Isabelle Giroux, Actress
- Hélène Théberge, Director of the Abitibi-Témiscamingue International Film Festival

== Films ==
=== Opening Film ===
The opening film Eddington is a 2025 American action comedy film by Ari Aster. It depicts the political and social turmoil in the fictional city of Eddington, New Mexico, caused by the COVID-19 pandemic.

English title	Original title	Director(s)	Production country
Eddington		Ari Aster	United States

=== Closing Film ===
The closing film Fixed is a 2025 American adult animated romantic comedy film by Genndy Tartakovsky. It follows a dog who learns that he is going to be neutered in the morning.

English title	Original title	Director(s)	Production country
Fixed		Genndy Tartakovsky	United States

=== Compétition Cheval Noir ===
Highlighted title and double-dagger (‡) indicates Cheval Noir Competition winner.

English title	Original title	Director(s)	Production country
Blank Canvas: My So-Called Artist Life		Kazuaki Seki	Japan
The Book of Sijjin and Illiyyin		Hadrah Daeng Ratu	Indonesia
Cielo		Alberto Sciamma	United Kingdom, Bolivia
I Fell in Love with a Z-Grade Director in Brooklyn	ブルックリンでZ級監督と恋に落ちた私	Kenichi Ugana	Japan
The Forbidden City		Gabriele Mainetti	Italy
I Live Here Now		Julie Pacino	United States
Mother of Flies‡		John Adams, Zelda Adams and Toby Poser	United States
New Group		Yuta Shimotsu	Japan
Stinker		Yerden Telemissov	Kazakhstan
Terrestrial		Steve Pink	United States
The Verdict		Lee Chang-hee, Yusron Fuadi	South Korea, Indonesia
The Well		Hubert Davis	Canada
The Woman		Hwang Wook	South Korea

=== New Flesh Competition ===
Highlighted title and double-dagger (‡) indicates New Flesh Competition winner.

English title	Original title	Director(s)	Production country
Find Your Friends		Izabel Pakzad	United States
Flush		Grégory Morin	France
Foreigner		Ava Maria Safai	Canada
Fucktoys		Annapurna Sriram	United States
Haunted Mountains: The Yellow Taboo		Tsai Chia Ying	Taiwan
Hellcat		Brock Bodell	United States
It Ends‡		Alex Ullom	United States
The Last Woman on Earth	지구 최후의 여자	Yeum Moon-kyoung and Lee Jong-min	South Korea
Nesting	Peau à peau	Chloé Cinq-Mars	Canada
Noise	노이즈	Kim Soo-jin	South Korea
The School Duel		Todd Wiseman Jr.	United States
Undertone		Ian Tuason	Canada
The Wailing	El llanto	Pedro Martín-Calero	Spain, Argentina, France
Ya Boy Kongming! The Movie	派對咖孔明	Shū Honma	Japan

=== International Short Film 2025 Competition ===
English title	Original title	Director(s)	Production country
Barlebas		Malu Janssen	Belgium, Netherlands
Bear		Rebecca Parker	Australia
Chaehwa		Hong Seung-gi	South Korea
The Collector		Scott Leberecht	United States
Confession		Mai Nakanishi	Japan
Ever After		Helen Hideko	Austria
Floor		Jo Ba-reun	South Korea
Hotel Acropole		Sarah Lasry	France
How to Open the Door		Park Ji-wan and Joan Hui Ji-yey	South Korea
Kill Tradition		Juliana Reza	Malaysia
Last Call		Winnie Cheung	United States
Let’s Settle This!		Jack Woon	New Zealand
Love Machine		Jon Clark	United States
Magai-Gami		Norihiro Niwatsukino	Japan
Mom, Stay Dead		Lee Na-hee	South Korea
Proxy		Artem Skiy	Japan
The Rebirth		Connie Shi	United States
Shrimp Fried Rice		Dylan Pun	Canada
S!cko		Philip Wan	Hong Kong
Sonic Beat		Shunta Seki	Japan
Sounds of Glass		Morgan Abele	Canada
Strip Mall		Andrew Appelle	Canada
Le Tour De Canada		John Hollands	Canada
Where Roots Go		Heo Ga-young	South Korea
Weird to Be Human		Jan Grabowski	Poland, France

=== Selection 2025 ===
English title	Original title	Director(s)	Production country
$Positions		Brandon Daley	United States
The 1%		Tal S. Shamir	United States
Blazing Fists	Blue Fight 〜蒼き若者たちのブレイキングダウン〜	Takashi Miike	Japan
Burning	Ot	Radik Eshimov	Kyrgyzstan
Dollhouse		Shinobu Yaguchi	Japan
Dui Shaw		Nuhash Humayun	Bangladesh
En Suspens		Émilie Sigouin	Canada
Find Your Friends		Izabel Pakzad	United States
Flush		Grégory Morin	France
Fragment		Kim Sung-yoon	South Korea
Fucktoys		Annapurna Sriram	United States
Garo: Taiga		Keita Amemiya	Japan
Good Boy		Ben Leonberg	United States
Good Game		Dickson Leung Kwok-Fai	Hong Kong
Hellcat		Brock Bodell	United States
Hi-Five	하이파이브	Kang Hyeong-cheol	South Korea
Hold the Fort		William Bagley	United States
Haunted Mountains: The Yellow Taboo		Tsai Chia Ying	Taiwan
Holy Night: Demon Hunters	거룩한 밤: 데몬 헌터스	Lim Dae-hee	South Korea
Honeko Akabane’s Bodyguards		Jun Ishikawa	Japan
It Ends		Alex Ullom	United States
Kazakh Scary Tales		Adilkhan Yerzhanov	Kazakhstan
The Last Woman on Earth	지구 최후의 여자	Yeum Moon-kyoung and Lee Jong-min	South Korea
LifeHack		Ronan Corrigan	United Kingdom, Cyprus
Lurker		Alex Russell	United States, Italy
Noise	노이즈	Kim Soo-jin	South Korea
OBEX		Albert Birney	United States
Omniscient Reader: The Prophet	전지적 독자 시점	Kim Byung-woo	South Korea
Queens of the Dead		Tina Romero	Mexico
Redux Redux		Kevin and Matthew McManus	United States
Rewrite		Daigo Matsui	Japan
Reflection in a Dead Diamond	Reflet dans un diamant mort	Hélène Cattet and Bruno Forzani	Belgium, Luxembourg, Italy, France
The School Duel		Todd Wiseman Jr.	United States
Stuntman		Herbert Leung Koon-Shun, Albert Leung Koon-Yiu	Hong Kong
Sham		Takashi Miike	Japan
Straight Outta Space		Michael Middelkoop	Netherlands
Taroman: Expo Explosion		Ryo Fujii	Japan
Together		Michael Shanks	Australia, United States
Touch Me		Addison Heinmann	Canada
Transcending Dimensions	次元を超える, Jigen o koeru	Toshiaki Toyoda	Japan
The Virgin of the Quarry Lake	La virgen de la tosquera	Laura Casabe	Argentina
The Wailing	El llanto	Pedro Martín-Calero	Spain, Argentina, France
Ya Boy Kongming! The Movie	派對咖孔明	Shū Honma	Japan

=== Animation Plus ===
==== Feature films ====
English title	Original title	Director(s)	Production country
All You Need is Kill		Kenichiro Akimoto	Japan
Angel's Egg	天使のたまご	Mamoru Oshii	Japan
ChaO		Yasuhiro Aoki	Japan
Dog of God		Raitis Abele, Lauris Abele	United States, Latva
Fixed		Genndy Tartakovsky	United States
The Girl Who Stole Time		Yu Ao and Zhou Tienan	China
I Am Frankelda	Soy Frankelda	Arturo and Roy Ambriz	Mexico
Juliet & the King		Ashkan Rahgozar	Iran
Maya, Give Me a Title	Maya, donne-moi un titre	Michel Gondry	France
Mononoke the Movie: The Ashes of Rage	劇場版「モノノ怪 第二章 火鼠	Kenji Nakamura	Japan
The Nightmare Before Christmas		Henry Selick	United States
Night of the Living Cat	ニャイト・オブ・ザ・リビングキャット	Takashi Miike	Japan
Tamala 2030: A Punk Cat in Dark		t.o.L	Japan
Thelma’s Perfect Birthday	Thelma du pays des glaces	Reinis Kalnaellis	Latvia

=== Documentaries From The Edge ===
English title	Original title	Director(s)	Production country
Inner-Walls	Au pied du mur	Alexandra Elkin	Canada
Japanese Avant-Garde Pioneers		Amélie Ravalec	Japan, United Kingdom, France
Occupy Cannes		Lily-Hayes	United States

=== Fantasia Underground ===
English title	Original title	Director(s)	Production country
Anything That Moves		Alex Phillips	United States
Contact Lens		Lu Ruiqi	China
Every Heavy Thing		Mickey Reece	United States
A Grand Mockery		Adam C. Briggs and Sam Dixon	Australia
Sugar Rot		Becca Kozak	Canada

=== The Fantastic Weekends of Quebec Cinema ===
This section highlights the talent of Quebec filmmakers, shown across their feature films.

English title	Original title	Director(s)	Production country
16mm		Francis Bordeleau	Canada
A Dios		Christine Rodriguez	Canada
Anna Kiri		Francis Bordeleau	Canada
A-Okay		Marie-Anne Décarie	Canada
Barbie Boomer		Marc Joly-Corcoran	Canada
Cardboard City	Ville Jacques-Carton	André Forcier, Jean-Marc E. Roy	Canada
Death Does Not Exist	La mort n'existe pas	Félix Dufour-Laperrière	Canada, France
En Suspens		Émilie Sigouin	Canada
Nesting	Peau à peau	Chloé Cinq-Mars	Canada
Old Guys in Bed		Jean-Pierre Bergeron	Canada

=== Fantasia Retro ===
English title	Original title	Director(s)	Production country
Angel's Egg		Mamoru Oshii	Japan
The Battle Wizard (1977)	天龍八部	Pao Hsueh-Li	Hong Kong
Bullet in the Head (1990)	喋血街頭	John Woo	China
A Chinese Ghost Story III (1991)	倩女幽魂III：道道道	Ching Siu-Tung	Hong Kong
The Devil's Bride (1975)		Arunas Zebriunas	Lithuania
Funky Forest: The First Contact (2005)	ナイスの森	Katsuhito Ishii, Shunichiro Miki, Hajime Ishimine	Japan
The House with Laughing Windows (1976)	La casa dalle finestre che ridono	Pupi Avati	Italy
Looking for an Angel (1999)	天使を探して	Akihiro Suzuki	Japan
Mixed Blood (1984)		Paul Morrissey	United States
Night of the Juggler (1980)		Robert Butler	United States
The Nightmare Before Christmas (1993)		Henry Selick	United States
Noroi: The Curse (2005)	ノロイ	Koji Shiraishi	Japan

=== Sepentrion Shadows ===
==== Feature films ====
English title	Original title	Director(s)	Production country
The Bearded Girl		Jody Wilson	United States
Buffet Infinity		Simon Glassman	Canada
Foreigner		Ava Maria Safai	Canada
Influencers		Kurtis David Harder	Canada
Lucid		Deanna Milligan and Ramsey Fendall	Canada
Sweetness		Emma Higgins	Canada
Undertone		Ian Tuason	Canada
The Well		Hubert Davis	Canada

=== Genre Du Pays ===
English title	Original title	Director(s)	Production country
Beans (2020)		Tracey Deer	Canada
Brrr... Version québécoise de The Uncanny (1977)		Denis Héroux	Canada, United Kingdom
The Last Tunnel (2004)	Le Dernier tunnel	Érik Canuel	Canada
Hostile Takeover (1988)		George Mihalka	Canada
Limoilou: Le film (2014)		Edgar Fritz	Canada
Pick-up Summer (1980)		George Mihalka	United States

=== My First Fantasia ===
English title	Original title	Director(s)	Production country
Juliet & the King		Ashkan Rahgozar	Iran
Maya, Give Me a Title	Maya, donne-moi un titre	Michel Gondry	France
Les Schtroumpfs (French version)		Chris Miller	United States, Belgium, Italy
Smurfs		Chris Miller	United States, Belgium
Thelma’s Perfect Birthday	Thelma du pays des glaces	Reinis Kalnaellis	Latvia

== Awards ==
The festival announced its juried awards, with Mother of Flies, by John Adams, Zelda Adams, and Toby Poser—collectively known as the Adams Family—receiving the Cheval Noir Award for Best Film. It also received The Sandro Forte Award for Best Motion Picture Score.

=== Cheval Noir competition ===
- Best Film: Mother of Flies by John Adams, Zelda Adams and Toby Poser
- Special Jury Mention (Best Film): New Group by Yuta Shimotsu
- Best Director: Hadrah Daeng Ratu for The Book of Sijjin And Illiyyin
- Best Screenplay: Connor Diedrich and Samuel Johnson for Terrestrial, by Steve Pink
- Best Cinematography: Alex Metcalfe for Cielo by Alberto Sciamma
- The Sandro Forte Award for Best Motion Picture Score: H6LLB6ND6R for Mother of Flies
- Outstanding Performance Award: Ui Mihara for I Fell in Love with a Z-Grade Director in Brooklyn by Kenichi Ugana

=== New Flesh competition ===
- Best First Feature — It Ends — Alexander Ullom
- Special Jury Mentions:
  - Fucktoys — Annapurna Sriram
  - Hellcat — Brock Bodell

=== International Short Film Competition ===
- Best Film: Barlebas by Malu Janssen
- Best Director: Jo Ba-reun for Floor
- Best Screenplay: Dylan Pun, for Shrimp Fried Rice by Dylan Pun)
- Best Cinematography: Barlebas by Sam Du Pon
- The Sandro Forte Award for Best Motion Picture Score: Proxy Christopher Lund
- Outstanding Performance Award: Ruby Zoom for The Collector and Agnieszka Rajda for Weird to Be Human
- Special Jury Mentions:
  - Weird to Be Human by Jan Grabowski
  - The Rebirth by Connie Shi

=== Satoshi Kon Award for Achievement in Animation ===
- Best Animated Feature: The Girl who Stole Time by Yu Ao and Zhou Tienan
- Special Jury Mention (Best Animated Feature): I Am Frankelda by Arturo and Roy Ambriz
- Best Animated Short, Gold: My Organs Lying on the Ground by Shinobu Soejima
- Best Animated Short, Silver: Éiru by Giovanna Ferrari
- Best Animated Short, Bronze: Off-Time by Nata Metlukh

=== Northern Excellence for Best Canadian Filmmaker ===
- Best Director (Feature Film): Chloé Cinq-Mars for Nesting (Peau à peau)
- Special Jury Mention: Simon Glassman for Buffet Infinity

=== Quebec Association of Film Critics, AQCC Award ===
- Best Film: The Virgin of the Quarry Lake by Laura Casabe
- Special Jury Mention: Burning by Radik Eshimov

=== Mon Poulain Noir Competition ===
- Best Film, Gold: The Sound of Raindrops by Max Banse, Julie Blanc, Alvaro Deolio, Elena Forlini, Estelle Jourdan, Gabriel Riera, and Lila Trouvé
- Best Film, Silver: Soap Box (Boîte À Savon) by Jimmy Pettigrew)
- Best Film, Bronze: Christopher & the Bug by Vanessa Lynn Esteves
- Special Jury Mentions: The Little One and the Giant by Isabela Costa and A Small Garden by the Window by Lee Jong-hoon

=== Les Fantastiques Week-Ends Du Cinéma Québécois Competition ===
- MELS Award for Best Short Film:
  - 1st Place: Mad Dog (Molosse) by Marc-Antoine Lemire
  - 2nd Place: Butter Knife by Théophile Mur
  - 3rd Place: Itty Bitty Betty by Laura Buchanan
  - Special Mention: Girasol by Dominic Couturier and Pierre Inglebert
- AQPM Award for Best Emerging Production in a Short Film: Iconic by April Daneau
  - Special Mention: Don’t Judge a Unicorn by Its Horn by Ellie Charette
- ARRQ Award for Best Direction in a Short Film: Guillaume Boivin and Steve Villeneuve, for The Screaming
  - Special Mention: Théophile Mur, for Butter Knife
- EVS Award for Best Emerging Direction in a Short Film: Andrew Cyr-Marcoux, for L’écho Perdu
- Royal Photo Award for Best Cinematography in a Short Film:
  - 1st place to Liane Paré for Dumpster Duchess by Raphë, Liana Paré
  - 2nd to Pierre Inglebert, for Girasol by Dominic Couturier and Pierre Inglebert)
  - 3rd to Martin Reisch, for Island of Forgetfulness by Erin Ross
  - Special Mention to Guillaume Langlois and Raphaël Ouellet, for Greluche by Daphnée Côté-Hallé
- Fantasia Award for Best Performance in a Short Film to Stéfanelle Auger, for Envolée by Renaud Ouimet
  - Special Mention to Marguerite Bouchard, for L’explosion, et puis le calme by William Tétreault and Maximilian Isaacs, for Here Comes Kermit Williams by Ryan Terk
- Canadian Cinema Editors (CCE) Award for Best Editing in a Short Film to John-Daniel Arauz, for Kitty the Viper by John-Daniel Arauz
  - Special Mention to Marc-Olivier Huard, for Interurbain by Marc-Olivier Huard
- Spira Award for Best Regional Short Film to Frères D’armes by François Lalonde
  - Special Mention to Rien Que Du Vent by PH Debiès
- Bam Music Award for Best Sound in a Short Film to Loud by Adam Azimov
- Toon Boom Award for Best 2D Short Film to Grain by Ilana Zackon
- Dragonframe Award for Best Stop Motion Short Film to Songes et étrangetés au jardin by Kimm D. and Caroline Hayeur
  - Special Mention to Exit the Red Room | A David Lynch Tribute by Corey Nikolaus
- Coup de Coeur SLA Location Award for a Short Film to A Better Day by Scott Cowan

=== Audience Awards ===
Audience awards were announced on August 5, 2025.

==== Best International Feature ====
- Gold: Flush, by Grégory Morin, France
- Silver: Fucktoys, by Annapurna Sriram, United States
- Bronze:
  - Terrestrial, by Steve Pink, United States
  - The Forbidden City, by Gabriele Mainetti, Italy

==== Best Asian Feature ====
- Gold: Burning by Radik Eshimov, Kyrgyzstan
- Silver: Hi-Five by Kang Hyeong-cheol, South Korea
- Bronze: I Fell in Love with a Z-Grade Director in Brooklyn by Kenichi Ugana, Japan

==== Best Animated Feature ====
- Gold: Death Does Not Exist by Félix Dufour-Laperrière, Canada
- Silver: I Am Frankelda by Arturo and Roy Ambriz, Mexico
- Bronze: Mononoke the Movie: The Ashes of Rage by Kenji Nakamura and Kiyotaka Suzuki, Japan

==== Best International Short ====
- Gold: Let’s Settle This! by Jack Woon, New Zealand
- Silver:
  - Steak Dinner by Nathan Ginter, United States
  - Skin by Urvashi Pathania, United States
- Bronze:
  - Check Please! by Shane Chung, United States
  - The Nightwalker by Mark Reyes, United States

==== Best Asian Short ====
- Gold: Floor by Jo Ba-reun, South Korea
- Silver: The Last Ride by Yashoda Parthasarthy and Vijesh Rajan, India
- Bronze: Red Spider Lilies: The Ascension by Koji Shiraishi, Japan

==== Best Animated Short ====
- Gold: LOCA! by Ion Miyamoto and Yuta Uchiya, Japan
- Silver: Mamiko’S Poop by Yasuteru Ohno, Japan
- Bronze:
  - Beyond the Trail by Vab.png, Japan
  - Maybe Blue by Zhou Qian, China

==== Best Canadian Feature ====
- Gold: The Undertone by Ian Tuason, Canada
- Silver: Foreigner by Ava Maria Safai, Canada
- Bronze: Buffet Infinity by Simon Glassman, Canada

==== Best Canadian Short ====
- Gold: The Sphinx by Jesse Padveen, Canada
- Silver: Shrimp Fried Rice by Dylan Pun, Canada
- Bronze: Heirlooms by Dan Abramovici, Canada

==== Best Quebec Feature ====
- Gold: Messy Legends by Kelly Kay Hurcomb and James Watts, Canada
- Silver: Inner Walls (Au pied du mur) by Alexandra Elkin, Canada
- Bronze: Anna Kiri by Francis Bordeleau, Canada

==== Best Quebec Short ====
- Gold: Duchess 17 by Daly Sonesaksith, Canada
- Silver: Steal My Life by Annie Wren, Canada
- Bronze: The Punk of Natashquan (Le Punk de Natashquan) by Nicolas Lachapelle, Canada

==== L’Écran Fantastiques Award ====
- I Am Frankelda by Arturo and Roy Ambriz, Mexico

=== Special Prizes ===
Sources:

- Canadian Trailblazer Award:
  - George Mihalka
  - Sheila McCarthy

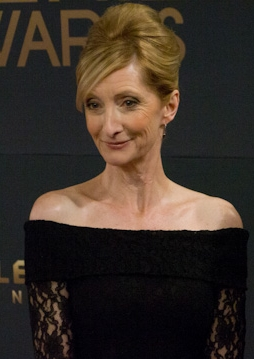
Sheila McCarthy, co-recipient of the Canadian Trailblazer Award

- Cheval Noir Lifetime Achievement Award:
  - Danny Elfman

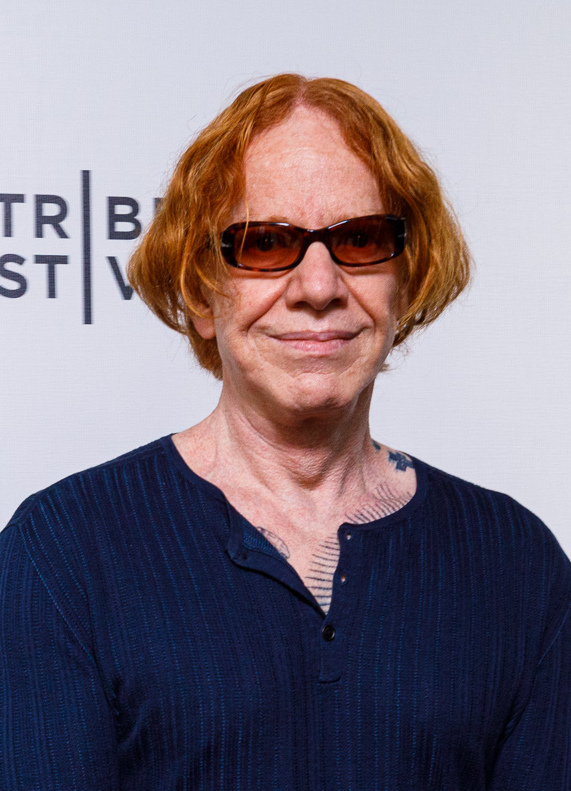
Danny Elfman, co-recipient of the Cheval Noir Lifetime Achievement Award

  - Genndy Tartakovsky

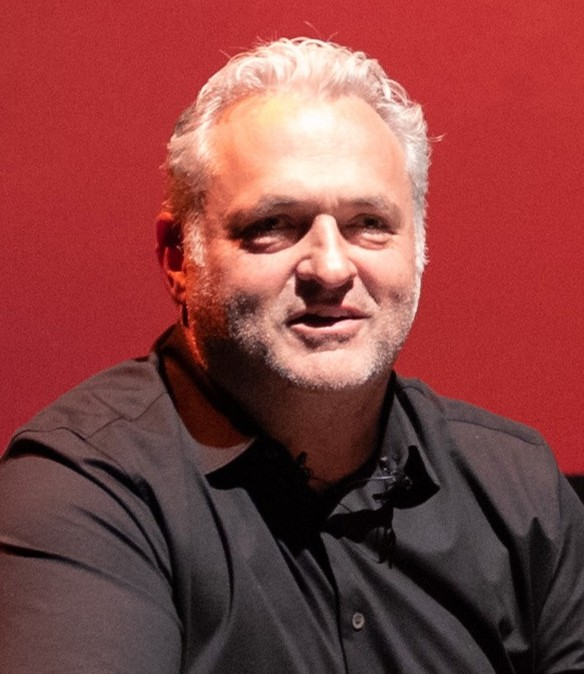
Genndy Tartakovsky, co-recipient of the Cheval Noir Lifetime Achievement Award

- Indie Maverick Award: Lloyd Kaufman

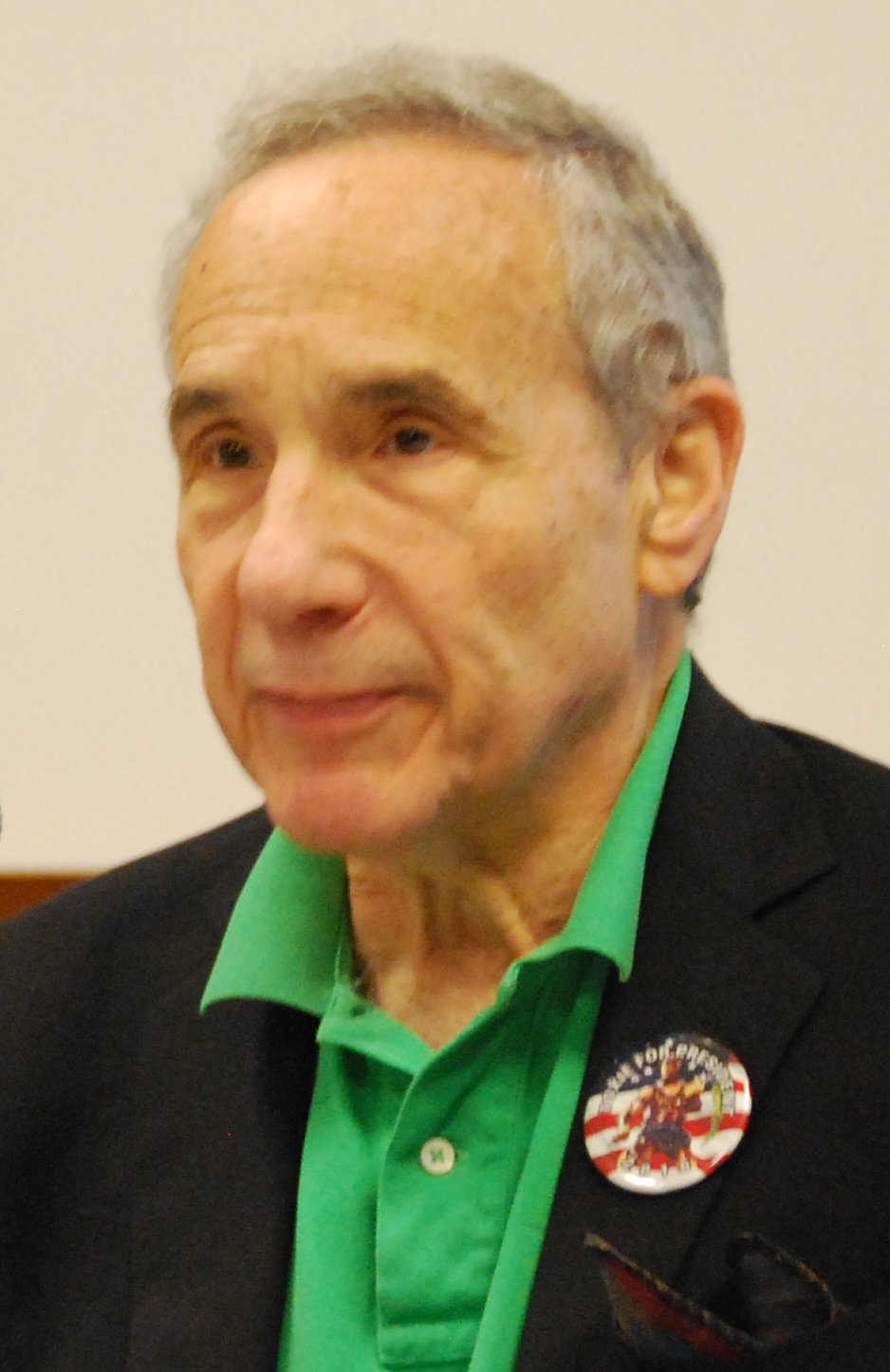
Lloyd Kaufman, recipient of the Indie Maverick Award

- Denis-Héroux Award: Anne-Marie Gélinas

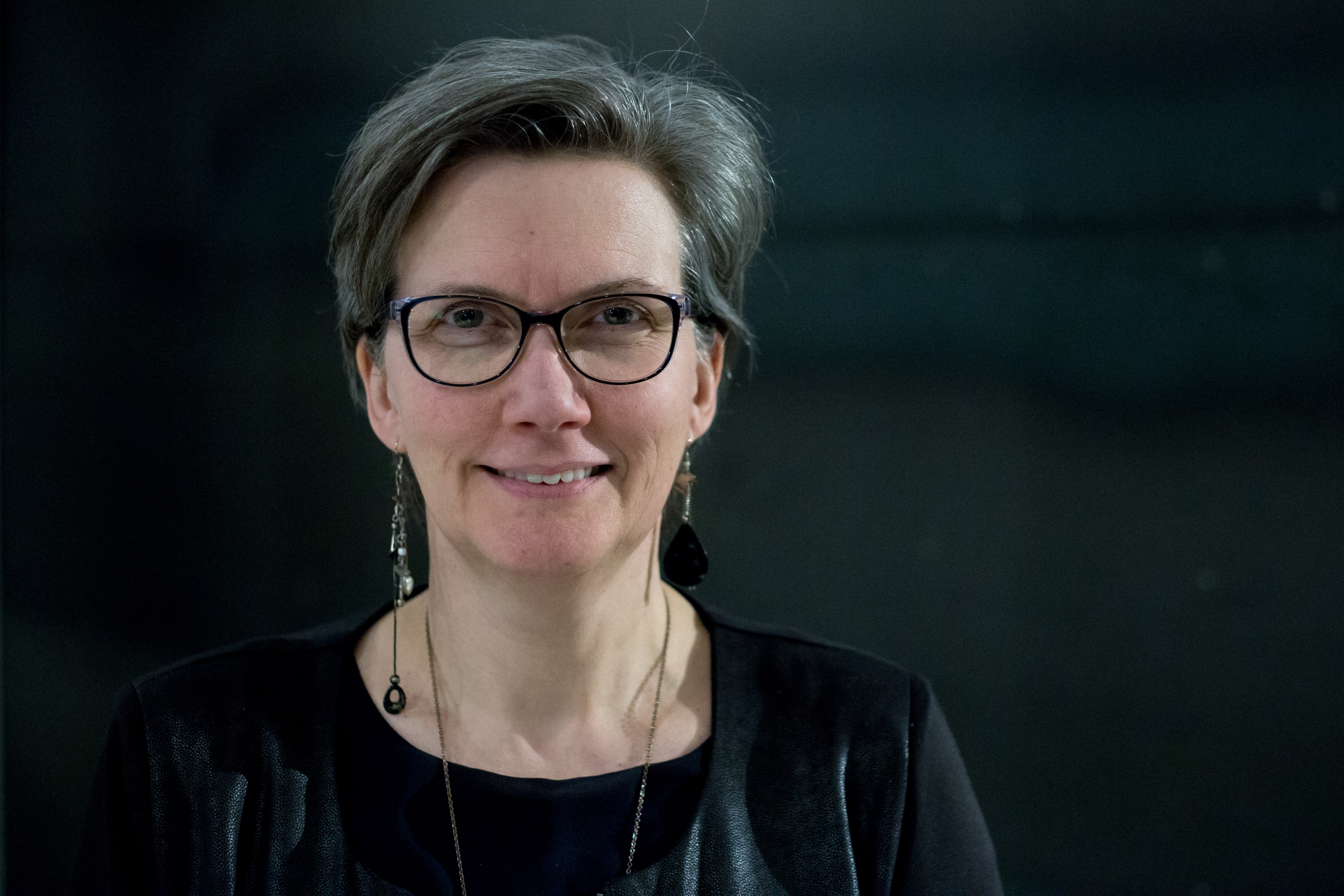
Anne-Marie Gélinas, recipient of the Denis-Héroux Award
