= Vancouver Film Critics Circle Awards 2023 =

Annual Canadian film awards ceremony

24th VFCC Awards

February 12, 2024

Best International Picture:
Anatomy of a Fall

Best Canadian Picture:
BlackBerry

The 24th Vancouver Film Critics Circle Awards were presented on February 12, 2024, to honour the films selected by the Vancouver Film Critics Circle as the best of 2023.

The nominations were announced on January 22, 2024, with Oppenheimer leading the international film nominations with six, followed by Anatomy of a Fall with four. BlackBerry and Seagrass received the most Canadian film nominations with six each.

== Winners and nominees ==
=== International ===
| Category | Winners and nominees | Films | Ref. |
|---|---|---|---|
| Best Picture | Justine Triet | Anatomy of a Fall | |
| Best Picture | Jonathan Glazer | The Zone of Interest | |
| Best Picture | Christopher Nolan | Oppenheimer | |
| Best Director | Christopher Nolan | Oppenheimer | |
| Best Director | Jonathan Glazer | The Zone of Interest | |
| Best Director | Martin Scorsese | Killers of the Flower Moon | |
| Best Male Actor | Paul Giamatti | The Holdovers | |
| Best Male Actor | Bradley Cooper | Maestro | |
| Best Male Actor | Cillian Murphy | Oppenheimer | |
| Best Female Actor | Sandra Hüller | Anatomy of a Fall | |
| Best Female Actor | Annette Bening | Nyad | |
| Best Female Actor | Emma Stone | Poor Things | |
| Best Supporting Male Actor | Robert Downey Jr. | Oppenheimer | |
| Best Supporting Male Actor | Willem Dafoe | Poor Things | |
| Best Supporting Male Actor | Robert De Niro | Killers of the Flower Moon | |
| Best Supporting Female Actor | Da'Vine Joy Randolph | The Holdovers | |
| Best Supporting Female Actor | Emily Blunt | Oppenheimer | |
| Best Supporting Female Actor | Jodie Foster | Nyad | |
| Best Screenplay | Greta Gerwig and Noah Baumbach | Barbie | |
| Best Screenplay | Christopher Nolan | Oppenheimer | |
| Best Screenplay | Justine Triet and Arthur Harari | Anatomy of a Fall | |
| Best Documentary | Nisha Pahuja | To Kill a Tiger | |
| Best Documentary | Davis Guggenheim | Still: A Michael J. Fox Movie | |
| Best Documentary | Matthew Heineman | American Symphony | |
| Best International Film in a Non-English Language | Jonathan Glazer | The Zone of Interest | |
| Best International Film in a Non-English Language | J. A. Bayona | Society of the Snow | |
| Best International Film in a Non-English Language | Justine Triet | Anatomy of a Fall | |

=== Canadian ===
| Category | Winners and nominees | Films | Ref. |
|---|---|---|---|
| Best Picture | Matt Johnson | BlackBerry | |
| Best Picture | Ariane Louis-Seize | Humanist Vampire Seeking Consenting Suicidal Person (Vampire humaniste cherche suicidaire consentant) | |
| Best Picture | Nisha Pahuja | To Kill a Tiger | |
| Best British Columbia Film | Meredith Hama-Brown | Seagrass | |
| Best British Columbia Film | Kathleen Jayme and Asia Youngman | I'm Just Here for the Riot | |
| Best British Columbia Film | Jules Arita Koostachin | WaaPaKe | |
| Best British Columbia Film | Sherren Lee | Float | |
| Best Director | Matt Johnson | BlackBerry | |
| Best Director | Atom Egoyan | Seven Veils | |
| Best Director | Nisha Pahuja | To Kill a Tiger | |
| Best British Columbia Director | Meredith Hama-Brown | Seagrass | |
| Best British Columbia Director | Laura Adkin | Re: Uniting | |
| Best British Columbia Director | Tyler Funk | Anything for Fame | |
| Best British Columbia Director | Sherren Lee | Float | |
| Best Male Actor | Jay Baruchel | BlackBerry | |
| Best Male Actor | Cody Lightning | Hey, Viktor! | |
| Best Male Actor | Théodore Pellerin | Solo | |
| Best Female Actor | Sara Montpetit | Humanist Vampire Seeking Consenting Suicidal Person (Vampire humaniste cherche suicidaire consentant) | |
| Best Female Actor | Rachel Sennott | I Used to Be Funny | |
| Best Female Actor | Amanda Seyfried | Seven Veils | |
| Best Supporting Male Actor | Glenn Howerton | BlackBerry | |
| Best Supporting Male Actor | Jonas Chernick | The Burning Season | |
| Best Supporting Male Actor | Matt Johnson | BlackBerry | |
| Best Supporting Male Actor | Chris Pang | Seagrass | |
| Best Supporting Female Actor | Nyha Huang Breitkreuz | Seagrass | |
| Best Supporting Female Actor | Wendy Crewson | Close to You | |
| Best Supporting Female Actor | Mia Goth | Infinity Pool | |
| Best Supporting Female Actor | Sabrina Jalees | I Used to Be Funny | |
| Best Supporting Female Actor | Rebecca Liddiard | Seven Veils | |
| Best Supporting Female Actor | Sophie Lorain | Testament | |
| Best Screenplay | Matt Johnson and Matthew Miller | BlackBerry | |
| Best Screenplay | Meredith Hama-Brown | Seagrass | |
| Best Screenplay | Julia Lederer | With Love and a Major Organ | |
| Best Documentary | Steve J. Adams and Sean Horlor | Satan Wants You | |
| Best Documentary | Robert McCallum | Mr. Dressup: The Magic of Make-Believe | |
| Best Documentary | Nisha Pahuja | To Kill a Tiger | |
| One to Watch | Ariane Louis-Seize | Humanist Vampire Seeking Consenting Suicidal Person (Vampire humaniste cherche suicidaire consentant) | |
| One to Watch | Meredith Hama-Brown | Seagrass | |
| One to Watch | Jenny Lee-Gilmore | Overtime | |
| One to Watch | Ally Pankiw | I Used to Be Funny | |
