= Matt Finlin =

Canadian documentary filmmaker

- Born: Cambridge, Ontario, Canada
- Occupation: Filmmaker
- Notable work: The Movie Man

Matt Finlin is a Canadian documentary filmmaker, who is partners with Karen Barzilay in the Door Knocker Media film studio. He is most noted for his 2024 film The Movie Man and his 2025 film Matter of Time.

== Early life and education ==
Born and raised in Cambridge, Ontario, he earned an Honours degree in psychology from the University of Guelph, followed by a Bachelor of Education from the University of Ottawa. After graduating, he worked as an English as a Second Language teacher in Taiwan, where he directed The Glass Box, a short film exploring Taiwan's betel nut trade. He later moved to New York City, where he released Below New York (2011), a documentary capturing the lives and performances of the city's subway buskers, in 2011.

== Career ==
Finlin founded Door Knocker Media in 2014 with producing partner Karen Barzilay. With the company, he worked as a director and producer of television specials and sponsored films for charitable organizations, including We Day specials, and a posthumous tribute special to actor Leslie Jordan.

The Movie Man, his feature documentary debut, premiered in February 2024 at the 39th Santa Barbara International Film Festival, and had its Canadian premiere at the Kingston Canadian Film Festival. The film received a Vancouver Film Critics Circle award nomination for Best Canadian Documentary at the Vancouver Film Critics Circle Awards 2024. Pete Hammond of Deadline dubbed the film "a Canadian Cinema Paradiso."

In 2025, Finlin released Matter of Time at the Tribeca Festival. The film profiles Eddie Vedder's series of fundraising concerts to raise money for research into a cure for epidermolysis bullosa.

== Matter of Time release and reception ==
Matter of Time had its world premiere at the Tribeca Festival in June 2025, where it screened as part of the festival's documentary lineup.

== Awards ==
The film received recognition on the international film festival circuit, including:

- Best Feature Music Documentary – Nashville Film Festival (2025)
- Artistic Director's Award – San Diego International Film Festival (2025)
