= Foreigner (2025 film) =

- Directed by: Ava Maria Safai
- Written by: Ava Maria Safai
- Produced by: Ava Maria Safai
- Starring: Rose Dehgan; Chloë MacLeod; Maryam Sadeghi; Ashkan Nejati; Talisa Mae Stewart; Victoria Wardell
- Cinematography: Saarthak Taneja
- Edited by: Ava Maria Safai
- Music by: Finka Wood
- Production companies: Saffron Blonde Productions; The Harlequin Theatre Society; Naltobel Productions
- Release date: July 31, 2025 (Fantasia)
- Running time: 82 minutes
- Country: Canada
- Languages: English; Persian

Foreigner is a 2025 Canadian horror-drama film written and directed by Ava Maria Safai in her feature-length film debut.

Described as Mean Girls meets The Exorcist in its blend of comedy, body horror and social commentary, the film stars Rose Dehgan as Yasamin Karimi, a teenage Iranian immigrant in 2004 who tries to fit in with the popular crowd by dyeing her hair blonde, only to unleash a demon tied to her cultural identity.

== Plot ==
In 2005, Yasamin Karimi, a 15-year-old Iranian girl, has just immigrated to a small town in British Columbia. Eager to belong, she follows the lead of the school’s queen bee Rachel Stanford, changing her hair, her voice, and her behaviour in an effort to become the perfect Canadian teen. But each step she takes away from her roots awakens something ancient and sinister.

The film explores assimilation, cultural erasure, intergenerational trauma, and belonging, using horror as a metaphor for the psychological effects of denying one's roots. The supernatural force functions as a personification of internalized shame and lost identity, rooted in Yasamin’s Iranian heritage.

== Cast ==
- Rose Dehgan as Yasamin Karimi
- Chloë MacLeod as Rachel Stanford
- Maryam Sadeghi as Zoreh Karimi
- Ashkan Nejati as Ali Karimi
- Talisa Mae Stewart as Kristen
- Victoria Wardell as Emily
- Cassie Collis as Sarah
- Matthew Graham as Dan
- Laurel Bailey as Mrs. Feinstein
- Erin McInnis as Martha
- Jim Maher as Rod
- Spencer Werenka as Marty Covack

== Production ==
Foreigner was produced by Saffron Blonde Productions in partnership with The Harlequin Theatre Society and Naltobel Productions, with support from Telefilm Canada’s Talent to Watch program.

The film was shot in Vancouver, British Columbia in August 2024.

== Release ==
The film premiered on July 31, 2025, at the 29th Fantasia International Film Festival, where it won the Silver Audience award for Best Canadian Film. It later had its international premiere at the Cineplex Odeon Luxe in London for FrightFest.

The film has been acquired for commercial distribution by Raven Banner Entertainment.

== Reception ==
Andrew Mack of Screen Anarchy wrote that "the level and intensity of the horror elements in this film are admittedly mild in comparison to the genre’s contemporaries, but it is perfect for its target audience, the generation following in Ava Maria Safai’s footsteps. In a way, Safai has taken it upon herself to be one of their guides, to share their experiences as a first-generation Iranian-Canadian, hopefully keep the ones after her clear of trouble, corporally and spiritually."

For The Hollywood News, Kat Hughes wrote that "as well as capturing teen ‘friendships’, Ava Maria Safai nails the 2004 time period, populating the screen with plenty of familiar trinkets and experiences from that era, without knocking the audience over the head with it. This allows even those who didn’t live through the early noughties to connect to the story without lots of quirkily placed references to distract them."

A.J. Friar of Elements of Madness wrote that "ultimately, Foreigner is a fresh, fearless, and highly rewatchable film. It’s a prime example of how horror can be used to tell deeply personal and culturally specific stories while still being entertaining, stylish, and fun. Ava Maria Safai is clearly a filmmaker to watch, and this film marks an exciting new entry into the canon of “bubblegum horror” with brains and heart. It’s another must-see selection from this year’s Fantasia lineup and one that’s sure to resonate with anyone who’s ever struggled to find where they belong."

== Accolades ==
Award	Date of ceremony	Category	Recipient	Result	Ref.
Fantasia International Film Festival	August 7, 2025	Silver Audience Award	Foreigner	Won	
Director's Guild of Canada	2025	Jean-Marc Vallée DGC Discovery Award	Foreigner	Shortlisted	
Vancouver Film Critics Circle	2025	Best British Columbia Film	Foreigner	Won	
Vancouver Film Critics Circle	2025	Best British Columbia Director	Ava Maria Safai	Nominated	
