= Can I Get a Witness? =

2024 film by Ann Marie Fleming

- Theatrical release poster
- Directed by: Ann Marie Fleming
- Written by: Ann Marie Fleming
- Produced by: Ann Marie Fleming; Raymond Massey; Ruth Vincent
- Starring: Keira Jang; Joel Oulette; Sandra Oh
- Cinematography: C. Kim Miles
- Edited by: Justin Li
- Music by: Brent Belke
- Production companies: Crescent Entertainment; Sleepy Dog Films; CIGAW Productions
- Distributed by: Mongrel Media
- Release dates: September 6, 2024 (TIFF); March 14, 2025 (Canada)
- Running time: 111 minutes
- Country: Canada
- Language: English

Can I Get a Witness? is a 2024 Canadian science fiction film directed by Ann Marie Fleming.

The film premiered at the Toronto International Film Festival on September 6, 2024 and was released in Canada on March 14, 2025.

== Premise ==
Blending live action and animation, the film is set in a postapocalyptic world in which travel and technology are virtually banned, and people who reach the age of 50 have to submit to death to control the size of the population, while young people are tasked with artistically documenting their final moments.

== Cast ==
- Keira Jang as Kiah
- Joel Oulette as Daniel
- Sandra Oh as Ellie
- Ben Immanuel as Peter

== Production ==
The majority of shooting took place in Powell River, British Columbia.

Production on the film was first announced in 2022. According to Fleming, the film was inspired by themes of eco-anxiety and ecological grief. Fleming originally intended for the film to be a satire inspired by the work of Jonathan Swift, but by release it had become what she called "a gentle comedy".

== Release ==
Can I Get a Witness? had its world premiere at the Toronto International Film Festival on September 6, 2024. It was commercially released in Canada by Mongrel Media on March 14, 2025.

The film was named to TIFF's annual Canada's Top Ten list for 2024.

== Critical response ==
Courtney Small of Exclaim! rated the film 5 out of 10, writing that "Similar to the witnesses, Fleming keeps the audience in the dark regarding the politics and overall logistics of the world. Can I Get a Witness? displays little interest in delving into any of the meaty topics it raises. For all its talk of equality, we never get the sense that the society Fleming constructs actually is an equitable one. Even Ellie's emotional plea for her daughter to continue the important work of witnessing feels at odds with itself since she uses illegal items as a tool for teaching about the past, banned by the same system she wants Kiah to uphold."

For Original Cin, Chris Knight rated it A, calling it a thought-provoking film that he was still processing after seeing it both in its original screening at TIFF and in its March 2025 commercial release.

== Awards ==
Award	Date of ceremony	Category	Recipient(s)	Result	Ref(s)
Vancouver Film Critics Circle	2024	Best Canadian Film	Ann Marie Fleming	Nominated	
Vancouver Film Critics Circle	2024	Best Director of a Canadian Film	Ann Marie Fleming	Won	
Vancouver Film Critics Circle	2024	Best Actress in a Canadian Film	Keira Jang	Nominated	
Vancouver Film Critics Circle	2024	Best Supporting Actress in a Canadian Film	Sandra Oh	Won	
Vancouver Film Critics Circle	2024	Best Screenplay for a Canadian Film	Ann Marie Fleming	Nominated	
Vancouver Film Critics Circle	2024	Best British Columbia Film	Ann Marie Fleming	Won	
Vancouver Film Critics Circle	2024	Best British Columbia Director	Ann Marie Fleming	Won	
Vancouver Film Critics Circle	2024	One to Watch	Keira Jang	Won	
Leo Awards	2025	Best Motion Picture	Ann Marie Fleming, Ruth Vincent, Raymond Massey, Haydn Wazelle, Sandra Oh	Won	
Leo Awards	2025	Best Lead Performance in a Motion Picture	Keira Jang	Won	
Leo Awards	2025	Best Direction in a Motion Picture	Ann Marie Fleming	Won	
Leo Awards	2025	Best Screenwriting in a Motion Picture	Ann Marie Fleming	Won	
Leo Awards	2025	Best Cinematography in a Motion Picture	C. Kim Miles	Won	
Leo Awards	2025	Best Editing in a Motion Picture	Justin Li	Nominated	
Leo Awards	2025	Best Musical Score in a Motion Picture	Brent Belke	Won	
Leo Awards	2025	Best Production Design in a Motion Picture	Cheryl Marion	Nominated	
Leo Awards	2025	Best Costume Design in a Motion Picture	Angela Bright, Julie Edgeley	Nominated	
Leo Awards	2025	Best Casting in a Motion Picture	Tina Marie McCulloch	Won	
Leo Awards	2025	Best Sound in a Feature Length Drama	Kelly Cole, Karla Melendez, Daniel Cardona, Gregorio Gomez, Rylan Kerbes, Paradox Delilah, Chris Baker, Kevin Belen	Nominated	
