= Tyler Funk =

Canadian filmmaker

Tyler Funk (born February 14, 1988) is a Canadian filmmaker. He is most noted for his 2023 documentary film Anything for Fame, for which he received a Vancouver Film Critics Circle nomination for Best British Columbia Director at the Vancouver Film Critics Circle Awards 2023.

The younger brother of filmmaker Kevan Funk, he was born in Vancouver, British Columbia, but grew up principally in Banff, Alberta. He subsequently moved back to Vancouver to study filmmaking at Langara College and the University of British Columbia. He directed a number of short films and television episodes in the 2010s, first becoming well known for his White Ninja series of short animated films on Vine.

Anything for Fame, a film about the extremes that people will go to achieve viral fame on the internet, was released by the National Film Board of Canada in 2023.

He is a partner with Sebastian Mercado in the Vancouver-based independent film studio North of Now.
