= Cecily Rhett =

American film director

- Occupation: Film editor

Cecily Rhett is a film editor and in 2007 directed a short film, Forward. She edited the 1999 film But I'm a Cheerleader, the 2001 film Stranger Inside and several episodes of the television series Biography.

== Biography ==
Rhett received a B.A. in Russian Language and Literature from Columbia University and a master's degree in Film Production from the University of Southern California.

== Filmography ==
=== Film editor ===
- 1994: Fuzzy Logic
- 1995: Alchemy
- 1998: Beyond Titanic
- 1999: Between Heaven and Hell: Hollywood Looks at the Bible
- 1999: But I'm a Cheerleader
- 1997–2000: Biography (TV)
- 2001: Stranger Inside
- 2007: Forward
- 2016: Polaris

=== Director ===
- 2007: Forward
