= Keira Jang =

Canadian actress

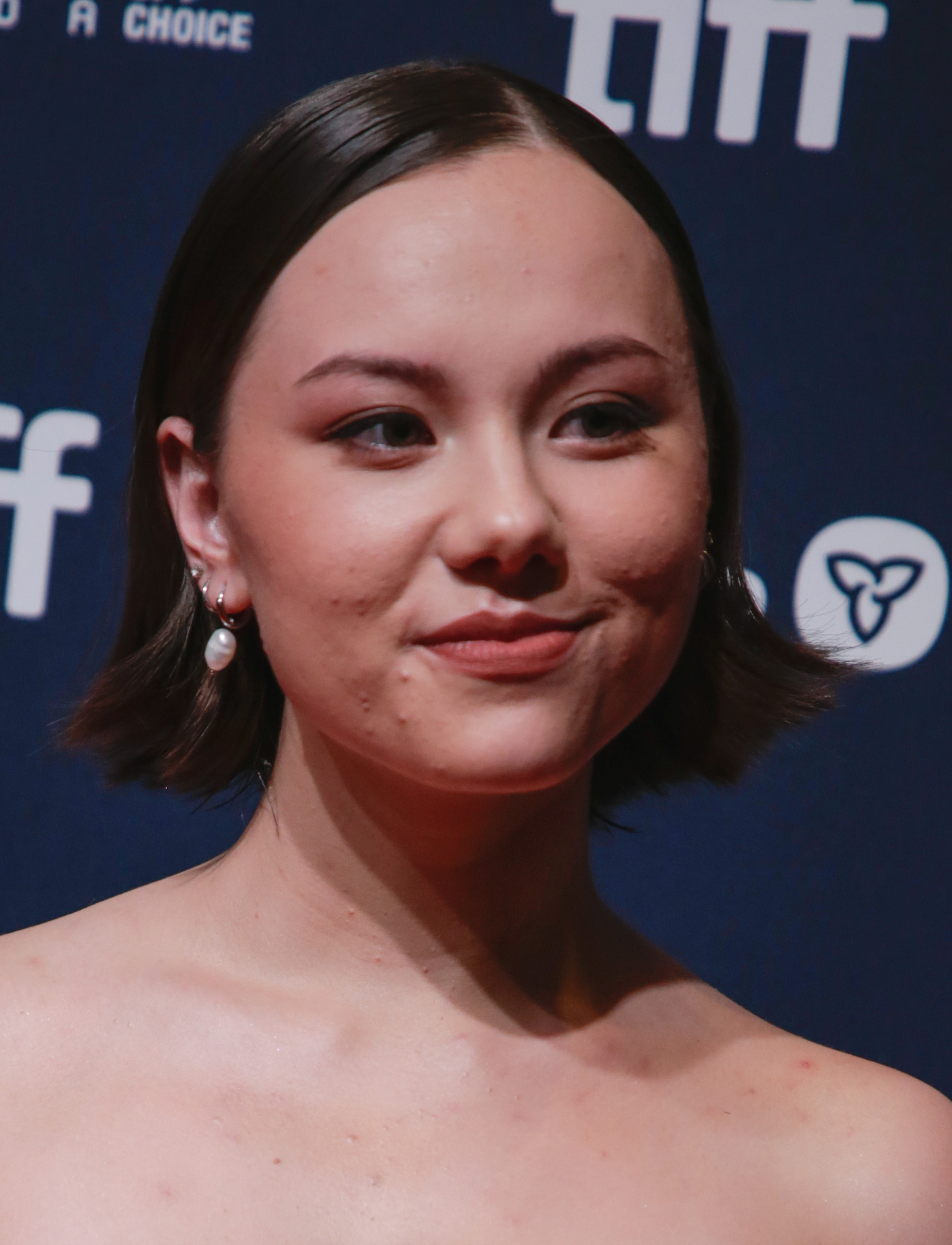
- Jang at the 2024 Toronto International Film Festival.
- Education: Capilano University
- Occupation: Actress
- Known for: Can I Get a Witness? (2024)
- Awards: One to Watch Award (2024)

Keira Jang is a Canadian actress from Vancouver, British Columbia. She is most noted for her performance as Kiah in the 2024 film Can I Get a Witness?, for which she won the Vancouver Film Critics Circle's One to Watch Award at the Vancouver Film Critics Circle Awards 2024.

An alumna of Capilano University, she previously had small guest appearances in the television series The Killing and Batwoman, acted in short films, and performed in stage roles in Vancouver. Can I Get a Witness? was her first role in a feature film. In addition to winning One to Watch, she was also nominated for Best Actress in a Canadian Film.
