= Seagrass (film) =

2023 Canadian drama film

- Film poster
- Directed by: Meredith Hama-Brown
- Written by: Meredith Hama-Brown
- Produced by: Sara Blake; Tyler Hagan
- Starring: Ally Maki; Luke Roberts
- Cinematography: Norm Li
- Edited by: Shun Ando; Kane Stewart
- Music by: Oscar Vargas
- Production companies: Ceroma Films; Experimental Forest Films
- Distributed by: Game Theory Films
- Release date: September 8, 2023 (TIFF)
- Running time: 115 minutes
- Country: Canada
- Language: English

Seagrass is a 2023 Canadian drama film, written and directed by Meredith Hama-Brown. Hama-Brown's full-length feature debut, the film stars Ally Maki as Judith, a woman who is at a family retreat with her husband Steve (Luke Roberts) and their children following the death of her mother, where she and Steve are coping with tensions in their marriage arising from their status as an interracial couple.

The cast also includes Nyha Huang Breitkreuz, Chris Pang, Sarah Gadon, Hannah Bos, Remy Marthaller, Benjamin Goas, Danielle Klaudt, Miles Phoenix Foley, Gabriel Carter, Kate Gajdosik, Sawyer Proulx, Milania Kerr, Kane Stewart, and Ava Kelders.

== Distribution ==
The film premiered in the Discovery program at the 2023 Toronto International Film Festival, and also screened at the 2023 Cinéfest Sudbury International Film Festival, the 2023 Vancouver International Film Festival, and the 2023 Atlantic International Film Festival.

== Reception ==
Seagrass has received positive reviews from film critics. On the review aggregator website Rotten Tomatoes, 91% of 22 critics' reviews are positive, with an average rating of 7.7/10. Metacritic, which uses a weighted average, assigned the film a score of 84 out of 100, based on 6 critics, indicating "universal acclaim".

Emma Badame of That Shelf wrote that "Hama-Brown’s camera lingers on the gorgeous scenery that surrounds this family in turmoil, and the relentless pounding of the waves against the beaches and cliff faces adds a sense of tension and urgency that belies the tranquility of the rest of their surroundings. As the film finally reaches its climax, and the powder-keg of Judith’s emotion finally explodes, it’s devastating in its simplicity but also in its relatability. It’s clear that in fictionalizing this version of her own experiences and racial identity, the writer-director has struck on something potent and even slightly beautiful about family and parenthood, and the damage done by repeated, generational mistakes."

For Exclaim!, Rachel Ho wrote that "along with cinematographer Norm Li, Hama-Brown offsets the natural beauty of BC's Gabriola Island with an eerie sensibility that makes Seagrass feel like a horror film ripe with Dutch angles. The grain of the 35 mm film used adds to the '90s setting and produces an unrefined atmosphere akin to a home video, as if we've stumbled upon these private moments."

The film was named to TIFF's annual Canada's Top Ten list for 2023.

== Awards ==
Award	Date of ceremony	Category	Recipient(s)	Result	Ref(s)
Canadian Screen Awards	2024	Best Costume Design	Athena Theny	Nominated	
Canadian Screen Awards	2024	Best Hair	Isabelle Paganine	Nominated	
Cinéfest Sudbury International Film Festival	2023	Outstanding Canadian Feature Film	Meredith Hama-Brown	Won	
Directors Guild of Canada	2023	Jean-Marc Vallée DGC Discovery Award	Meredith Hama-Brown	Longlisted	
Festival du nouveau cinéma	2023	Prix de la diffusion Québécor	Meredith Hama-Brown	Won	
Toronto International Film Festival	2023	FIPRESCI Prize	Meredith Hama-Brown	Won	
Vancouver Film Critics Circle	2023	Best British Columbia Film	Meredith Hama-Brown	Won	
Vancouver Film Critics Circle	2023	Best British Columbia Director	Meredith Hama-Brown	Won	
Vancouver Film Critics Circle	2023	Best Supporting Actress in a Canadian Film	Nyha Huang Breitkreuz	Won	
Vancouver Film Critics Circle	2023	Best Supporting Actor in a Canadian Film	Chris Pang	Nominated	
Vancouver Film Critics Circle	2023	Best Screenplay for a Canadian Film	Meredith Hama-Brown	Nominated	
Vancouver Film Critics Circle	2023	One to Watch	Meredith Hama-Brown	Nominated	
