= Forward (film) =

- Directed by: Nic Collar
- Screenplay by: Nic Collar; Tanner March
- Produced by: Ryan Scott; Olli Dickerson; Tanner March
- Starring: Clayton March; Tanner March
- Cinematography: Cody Preston; Viktor Wallmark; Nate Laverty; Rob Anthill; Nic Collar
- Edited by: Nic Collar
- Music by: Paul Michael Thomas
- Release date: December 3, 2025 (Whistler)
- Running time: 66 minutes
- Country: Canada
- Language: English

Forward is a Canadian documentary film, directed by Nic Collar and released in 2025. The film profiles Clayton March, an adaptive athlete with cerebral palsy who, with the help of his brother Tanner, has recreationally taken up both surfing and skiing.

Other figures appearing in the film include Alex Cairns, Mac Marcoux, Victoria Feige and Kai Colless.

The film premiered in the Mountain Culture program at the 2025 Whistler Film Festival.

== Awards ==
Award	Date of ceremony	Category	Recipient(s)	Result	Ref.
Vancouver Film Critics Circle	February 23, 2026	Best Canadian Documentary	Forward	Nominated	
Vancouver Film Critics Circle	February 23, 2026	Best British Columbia Film	Forward	Nominated	
Vancouver Film Critics Circle	February 23, 2026	Best British Columbia Director	Nic Collar	Won	
