= Lucid (2025 film) =

- Directed by: Ramsey Fendall; Deanna Milligan
- Written by: Ramsey Fendall; Deanna Milligan
- Produced by: Ramsey Fendall; Deanna Milligan; Emanuel Foucault
- Starring: Caitlin Taylor; Vivian Vanderpuss
- Cinematography: Ramsey Fendall
- Edited by: Ramsey Fendall; Deanna Milligan
- Music by: Marta Jaciubek-McKeever
- Production company: Sub-Lunar Films
- Distributed by: Filmoption International; Dark Star Pictures
- Release date: July 21, 2025 (Fantasia)
- Running time: 108 minutes
- Country: Canada
- Language: English

Lucid is a Canadian horror film, directed by Ramsey Fendall and Deanna Milligan and released in 2025. The film stars Caitlin Taylor as Mia Sunshine Jones, an art student on the verge of being expelled from school. Desperate to find the creative inspiration that will improve her art, she turns to a magical elixir that triggers lucid dreaming, only to unleash manifestations of her own inner demons, including a hairy monster (Vivian Vanderpuss) representing her painful repressed memories of her mother.

== Production ==
The full-length directorial debut for both Fendall and Milligan, a married couple, it is an expansion of their 2021 short film of the same title.

After struggling to secure studio support for the feature film version, they were encouraged to find ways to make and fund it themselves as an independent film. They shot the film in their home community of Oak Bay, British Columbia, although the temporary apartment set they built in their garage was erroneously reported to the authorities by a neighbour as an illegal AirBNB.

== Distribution ==
The film premiered in 2025 at the 29th Fantasia International Film Festival, and was subsequently screened in the New Visions competition at the 58th Sitges Film Festival.

It has been acquired for theatrical distribution by Filmoption International in Canada and Dark Star Pictures in the United States, with commercial release scheduled for May 2026.
