= Vasilios Filippakis =

Canadian actor

- Born: August 8, 1991 (age 35); Canada
- Occupation: Actor
- Years active: 2019–present

Vasilios Filippakis (born August 8, 1991) is a Canadian actor, best known for his supporting role as Julian Katsaros in the television series Ride.

Born in Windsor, Ontario, and raised in the suburban town of Tecumseh, he first became known for the 2019 web series Fak Yaass, which was based partially on his own experiences coming out as gay to his Greek Canadian family.

He has also appeared in the television series Hudson & Rex, the film Inedia, and the web series Settle Down.
