= The Drone =

- Directed by: Jordan Rubin
- Written by: Al Kaplan; Jon Kaplan; Jordan Rubin
- Produced by: Jordan Rubin; Adam Sidman
- Starring: Alex Essoe; John Brotherton; Anita Briem; Rex Linn; Neil Sandilands; Simon Rex
- Cinematography: Jonathan Hall
- Edited by: Jake York
- Music by: Al Kaplan; Jon Kaplan
- Production companies: Bazelevs Company; Hall²
- Distributed by: Lionsgate Films
- Release date: 28 January 2019 (Slamdance Film Festival)
- Running time: 82 minutes
- Country: United States
- Language: English

The Drone is a 2019 American comedy horror film directed by Jordan Rubin, starring Alex Essoe, John Brotherton, Anita Briem, Rex Linn, Neil Sandilands and Simon Rex.

== Cast ==
- Alex Essoe as Rachel Howard
- John Brotherton as Chris Howard
- Anita Briem as Corrine Coldwell
- Rex Linn as Dominic Baker
- Neil Sandilands as The Violater
- Simon Rex as Jeffries
- Gonzalo Menendez as Detective Ramirez
- Sam Adegoke as Detective Allen
- Christopher Matthew Cook as Richie
- Edgar Blackmon as Filip
- Dominique Jane as Mary
- Chris D'Elia as DJ Riggs (voice)
- John Mayer as DJ Murtaugh (voice)
- A.J. LoCascio as Additional Voice
- Jenn Brown as News Anchor

== Release ==
The film premiered at the Slamdance Film Festival on 28 January 2019.

== Reception ==
David Gelmini of Dread Central rated the film 4.5 stars out of 5 and called it "one of the best possessed object horror films to be released in recent years."

Chuck Foster of Film Threat gave the film a score of 7/10 and called it "silly entertainment with some fun kills."

Anton Bitel of SciFiNow wrote: "If the premise of The Drone is ludicrous, it knows it – and has great fun with showing the incredulous responses of its characters whenever anyone tries to describe precisely that premise."

Film critic Kim Newman called the film "cheerfully ridiculous" and wrote that it "seesaws between being a film you laugh with to being a film you laugh at, but at least you're laughing."
