= Chosen Family (film) =

- Theatrical release poster
- Directed by: Heather Graham
- Written by: Heather Graham
- Produced by: Chad A. Verdi; Michelle Verdi; Chad Verdi Jr.; Andre Relis; Chris Collins; Michael Nickels; Paul Luba; Anthony Gudas
- Starring: Heather Graham; John Brotherton; Andrea Savage; Michael Gross; Julie Halston; Thomas Lennon; Julia Stiles
- Cinematography: Steven Fierberg
- Production company: Verdi Productions
- Distributed by: Brainstorm Media
- Release dates: February 17, 2024 (Santa Barbara); October 11, 2024
- Running time: 88 minutes
- Country: United States
- Language: English

Chosen Family is a 2024 American comedy-drama film, written and directed by Heather Graham. It stars Graham, John Brotherton, Andrea Savage, Michael Gross, Julie Halston, Thomas Lennon and Julia Stiles.

It had its world premiere at the 2024 Santa Barbara International Film Festival on February 17, and was released on October 11, 2024, by Brainstorm Media.

== Cast ==
- Heather Graham as Ann
- John Brotherton as Steve
- Andrea Savage as Roz
- Michael Gross as Alfred
- Julie Halston as Dorothy
- Thomas Lennon as Max
- Julia Stiles as Clio
- Odessa Rae as Frances
- Ella Grace Helton as Lily
- Mark Famiglietti as Todd
- Sriram Emani as John

== Production ==
In May 2023, it was announced Heather Graham would direct, write, and star in the film, with Julia Stiles, Thomas Lennon, Michael Gross, Andrea Savage, John Brotherton, and Odessa Rae also joining the cast.

Principal photography concluded by June 2023, in Rhode Island.

== Release ==
It had its world premiere at the 39th Santa Barbara International Film Festival on February 17, 2024. In August 2024, Brainstorm Media acquired distribution rights to the film, setting it for an October 11, 2024, release.
