= The Last Daughter =

Australian documentary movie

- Directed by: Brenda Matthews; Nathaniel Schmidt
- Produced by: Simon Williams; Brendon Skinner
- Edited by: David Scarborough
- Production company: Gravity Films
- Release date: 30 August 2022 (Australia)
- Running time: 90 min

The Last Daughter is a 2022 Australian feature documentary film, directed by Brenda Matthews and Nathaniel Schmidt, and produced by Simon Williams and Brendon Skinner. It premiered on 30 October 2022 at the Adelaide Film Festival, followed by theatrical release in Australia on 15 June 2023. The film focuses on Brenda Matthews, an Aboriginal Australian woman who was removed from her family as a child and placed with a white family, under government policies prevalent at the time.

== Synopsis ==
The film explores the experiences of Brenda Matthews, an Aboriginal Australian woman who was one of many Aboriginal and "half-caste" children who were forcibly removed from their families by the government authorities in the twentieth century, and placed in foster care with White families or in institutions. The displaced children later became to be known as the Stolen Generations.

Matthews grew up in a loving White family, but was suddenly removed again and returned to her Aboriginal family, losing all contact with her foster family. Decades later, she goes searching for the foster family with whom she has lost all contact.

== Cast ==
The film features interviews and accounts from:

- Brenda Matthews
- Mark Matthews
- Brenda Simon (Nan)
- Mac Ockers
- Connie Ockers

== Production ==
The Last Daughter was directed by Brenda Matthews and Nathaniel Schmidt, and produced by Simon Williams and Brendon Skinner of Gravity Films. It was executive produced by Kyle Slabb, Michael Tear, Taryn Brumfitt. It was edited by David Scarborough.

Principal photography began on early 2022 and took place through to July 2022. It was filmed in locations in Queensland, New South Wales, and South Australia.

The run time of the film is 90 minutes.

== Release ==
The film made its debut on 30 October 2022 at the Adelaide Film Festival where it also received the Audience Award for Best Documentary. It was released in Australian cinemas on 15 June 2023.

Its United States premiere took place at the Santa Barbara International Film Festival on 13 February 2024, where it won two awards.

== Reception ==
The Last Daughter was met with positive reviews from critics. Luke Buckmaster of The Guardian wrote "The Last Daughter gracefully shows how old wounds can be healed and how distant memories can come back into colour and focus". Dov Kornitz of FilmInk praised the involvement of Matthews in the creative decision-making process of the production, saying "Schmidt's filmmaking talent and the sheer power in Matthews' life story create an affecting experience that is hard to forget".

== Awards and nominations ==
- 2022: Winner, Audience Award for Best Documentary at the Adelaide Film Festival
- 2023: Winner, Best Australian Film at the Gold Coast Film Festival
- 2023: Nominated, Best Direction in a Debut Feature Film (Brenda Matthews and Nathaniel Schmidt), ADG Awards
- 2023: Winner, Melodie Award for Best Editing in Trailers and Promos (Veina Yang), Australian Screen Editors Awards
- 2023: Nominated, Audio Network Award for Best Editing in Documentary Feature (David Scarborough), Australian Screen Editors Award
- 2024: Winner, Social Justice Award for Documentary Film, at the 39th Santa Barbara International Film Festival
- 2024: Winner, ADL Stand Up Award, at the 39th Santa Barbara International Film Festival
- 2024: Nominated, AACTA Award for Best Feature Documentary
