= The Movie Man (film) =

- Film poster
- Directed by: Matt Finlin
- Produced by: Karen Barzilay
- Cinematography: Matt Finlin
- Edited by: James Yates
- Music by: Kevin Drew
- Production company: Door Knocker Media
- Distributed by: Mongrel Media
- Release date: February 12, 2024 (SBIFF)
- Running time: 88 minutes
- Country: Canada
- Language: English

The Movie Man is a 2024 Canadian documentary film directed by Matt Finlin. It is about a small independent movie theatre named Highlands Cinemas, which is located in the village of Kinmount in the region of Kawartha Lakes, Ontario. Its eccentric owner, Keith Stata, tries to keep it in business. One of the film's executive producers is Ed Robertson of the band Barenaked Ladies, who's a long-time patron of the theatre.

The film was released on February 12, 2024, at the 39th Santa Barbara International Film Festival, followed by its Canadian premiere at the Kingston Canadian Film Festival on February 28.

== Reception ==
In a positive review, Sarah Bea of Exclaim! wrote, "The Movie Man is a solid independent documentary that, despite some faults, remains a charming slice of Kawartha life."

Barry Hertz of The Globe and Mail wrote, "[W]ith his charming and humble new documentary The Movie Man, Canadian director Matt Finlin delivers an ode to the theatrical experience that is genuine without slipping into easy sentimentality. While the sometimes thin, sometimes jumbled film won't turn around an industry in very real peril, it should embolden already hardcore cinephiles to keep fighting the good fight."

=== Accolades ===
The film was nominated for Best Canadian Documentary at the Vancouver Film Critics Circle Awards 2024.
