= John Brotherton =

American actor born (born 1980)

- Born: August 21, 1980 (age 46); Ellensburg, Washington, US
- Education: Oregon State University
- Occupation: Actor
- Years active: 2005–present
- Spouse: Alison Raimondi (m. 2008)
- Children: 2

John Brotherton (born August 21, 1980) is an American actor. He is most known for playing Matt Harmon on Netflix's Fuller House, and had roles in films such as Furious 7 (2015) and The Conjuring. He portrayed Jared Banks on the ABC soap opera One Life to Live.

== Early life ==
Brotherton was born in Ellensburg, Washington, and lived shortly in Seattle before moving with his family to Portland, Oregon, when he was 6 years old and attended elementary school in Portland. The family later moved to the Portland suburb of Beaverton, where Brotherton attended Whitford Junior High School and Beaverton High School, graduating from the latter in 1998. Brotherton attended Oregon State University in Corvallis, Oregon, and was a member of Kappa Sigma fraternity. He began acting at the age of 10.

== Career ==
In 2025, Brotherton played Brad Hamilton in The Conjuring: Last Rites and in 2024 he played lead character Steve in Chosen Family. From 2016 to 2020, he played Matt Harmon, DJ's love interest, on the Netflix series Fuller House, a sequel series to the ABC sitcom Full House. Prior to that Brotherton starred in films such as The Conjuring, Furious 7, and many others. He is also known for playing Jared Banks on the ABC soap opera One Life to Live from August 10, 2007, until November 13, 2009, before reappearing as a vision on February 9, 2010.

== Personal life ==
Brotherton married his longtime girlfriend Alison on June 7, 2008. They have two daughters.

== Filmography ==
=== Film ===
Year	Title	Role	Notes
2005	Pervert!	Frat boy	
2006	Analog Days	Butler	
2007	Smith and Mike on a Tuesday	Smith	Short film
2009	Surprise, Surprise	Colin Alexandre	
2010	Taken by Force	Billy Crew	
2010	Gone	Mike MacGregor	
2011	Sawdust City	Franko	
2012	True Love	Jack Reilly	
2012	Pearblossom Hwy	Jeff Lawler	
2013	The Conjuring	Brad Hamilton	
2014	Guardians of the Galaxy	Nova Starblaster Pilot	
2015	Furious 7	Sheppard Brian O'Conner	Portrayed Brian O'Conner for some scenes as a stand-in for Paul Walker
2016	Precious Cargo	Nicholas	
2019	The Drone	Chris	
2024	The Undertaker's Wife	Jack Davis	
2024	Chosen Family	Steve	
2025	The Conjuring: Last Rites	Brad Hamilton	

=== Television ===
Year	Title	Role	Notes
2006	The Game	Chuck	Episode: "Gifted"
2007–2010	One Life to Live	Jared Banks	Role held: August 10, 2007 – February 9, 2010
2010	Romantically Challenged	Leo	Episode: "Rebecca's One Night Stand"
2010	Drop Dead Diva	Will Casey	Episode: "Will & Grayson"
2011	Friends with Benefits	Dr. Matt	Episode: "The Benefit of the Mute Button"
2011	Free Agents	Andrew	Episode: "What I Did for Work"
2011	Dexter	Joe Walker	Episode: "Those Kinds of Things"
2011	CSI: Crime Scene Investigation	Kevin Fetzer	Episode: "Crime After Crime"
2012	Fairly Legal	Agent Hughes	Episode: "Start Me Up"
2012	Jane by Design	Dakota	2 episodes: "The Online Date", "The Backup Dress"
2012	Help for the Holidays	Dave Gabriel	Television film
2013	Family Tools	Kevin Kirkpatrick	Episode: "Jack Steps Up"
2013	Work It	Dave Bowden	Episode: "Masquerade Balls"
2014	Gortimer Gibbon's Life on Normal Street	Duke Whitmore	Episode: "Gortimer and the Leaky Dreamcatcher"
2014	Partners	Jake Garrett	Episode: "The Curious Case of Benjamin Butt-Ugly"
2014	Stalker	Scott Mason	Episode: "A Cry for Help"
2015	2 Broke Girls	Agent Drake	Episode: "And the Cupcake Captives"
2016	Timeless	Gene Kranz	Episode: "Space Race"
2016	Girlfriends of Christmas Past	Anderson Whitmire	Television film
2016–2020	Fuller House	Matt Harmon	Recurring role (season 1); main role (seasons 2–5)
2018	Modern Family	Clay	Episode: "Royal Visit"
2019	Family Reunion	Police Officer	Episode: "Remember When Our Boys Became Men?"
2021	American Horror Stories	Steven	Episode: "Game Over"
2021	The Christmas Contest	Ben	Television film
2022	Lights, Camera, Christmas!	Brad	Television film
2023	Christmas on Cherry Lane	John Hamilton	Television film
2024	Dead Boy Detectives	Seth Von Hoverkraft	Episode: "The Case of the Hungry Snake"
2024	9-1-1	Tim Nash	2 episodes "Step Nine", "Ashes, Ashes"
2024	Following Yonder Star	Tom	Hallmark Movie
