= Barbie Boomer =

- Directed by: Marc Joly-Corcoran
- Screenplay by: Marc Joly-Corcoran
- Produced by: Marc Joly-Corcoran
- Starring: Sylvie Longpré; Lydia Bouchard
- Edited by: Marc Joly-Corcoran
- Music by: Patrick Krouchian
- Production company: Paraffilm
- Release date: July 30, 2025 (Fantasia)
- Running time: 78 minutes
- Country: Canada
- Language: French

Barbie Boomer is a Canadian documentary film, directed by Marc Joly-Corcoran and released in 2025. The film centres on the human cultural phenomenon of collecting through the story of his mother's cousin Sylvie Longpré, a woman who has been a lifelong collector of Barbie dolls and merchandise, as she approaches Lydia Bouchard of the Musée de la civilisation with a plan to donate some of her collection to the institution due to her advancing age.

The film premiered on July 30, 2025, at the 29th Fantasia International Film Festival.

== Critical response ==
Jason Gorber of Point of View wrote that "Joly-Corcoran’s camera slyly slides between the intimate portrait of its subject, glamorous macro shots of these massive collections, carefully staged interview sequences, and more journalistically distanced moments. One particularly effective sequence sees the camera swing to show a large, hearse-like SUV drive up and park in a driveway, captured at a respectful distance. Several figures emerge, their austere black outfits exuding a sense of solemnity. Mirroring undertakers, they bring out boxes and wrappings, there to relocate a set of plastic bodies replete with their personal effects. Each moulded individual is given a toe tag to mark their identity, with acid-free paper taking the space of a funereal shroud. It’s a macabre, mildly comical moment that amplifies the almost religious treatment these playthings are granted as they morph from a personal pile to a museum-sanctified collection."
