= Ava Maria Safai =

Canadian filmmaker, musician, and creative entrepreneur

- Born: Vancouver, British Columbia, Canada
- Occupations: Director; writer; producer; editor; musician; actress
- Years active: 2016-present
- Notable work: Foreigner

Ava Maria Safai is an Iranian-Canadian director, writer, producer, editor, musician, and actress, whose debut feature film Foreigner was released in 2025.

== Career ==
Safai began her creative career as a musician and theatre performer in Vancouver, before turning to filmmaking. In 2020, she founded The Harlequin Theatre Society, through which she developed shorts, features, and experimental projects.

Her early work included music videos and short films created as incubators for young and emerging artists.

In 2025 she completed her first feature, Foreigner, written in a single day as a personal diary piece and later produced with support from Telefilm’s Talent to Watch program. The film follows Yasamin Karimi, a teenage Iranian immigrant in early 2000s Canada who unleashes a demon after dyeing her hair blonde to fit in with the mainstream.

The film premiered in 2025 at the 29th Fantasia International Film Festival, where it was the winner of the Silver Audience Award for Canadian feature films. The film was subsequently shortlisted for the Directors Guild of Canada's Jean-Marc Vallée DGC Discovery Award.

At the Vancouver Film Critics Circle Awards 2025, Foreigner won the award for Best British Columbia Film, and Safai was nominated for Best British Columbia Director.

== Style and themes ==
Safai’s films combine playful aesthetics (particularly Y2K culture) and nostalgia with psychological horror and social commentary. Her work often centres on identity, assimilation, and the cost of belonging, using horror as a metaphorical lens. She describes her style as “bubblegum horror”: candy-coated visuals concealing darker undercurrents.

== Filmography ==
Year	Title	Director	Writer	Producer	Editor	Notes
2023	ZIP	Yes	Yes	Yes	Yes	Short film
2025	Foreigner	Yes	Yes	Yes	Yes	Feature film
