= Buffet Infinity =

- Film poster
- Directed by: Simon Glassman
- Screenplay by: Simon Glassman
- Produced by: Michael Peterson; Simon Glassman
- Starring: Kevin Singh; Claire Theobald; Donovan Workun; Allison Bench
- Production company: Peterson Polaris
- Release date: July 28, 2025 (Fantasia)
- Running time: 100 minutes
- Country: Canada
- Language: English

Buffet Infinity is a 2025 Canadian satirical analog horror comedy film directed by Simon Glassman in his feature film debut. A satire of consumerism inspired by Second City Television and told entirely through mock television commercials, the film centres on the fictional Westridge County in Alberta, where two restaurants are fighting each other for dominance, spawning cults, sinkholes, and other apocalyptic events.

The cast includes Kevin Singh, Claire Theobald and Donovan Workun. Glassman began working on the film in 2020 as a short YouTube sketch before expanding the concept, shooting and reshooting hundreds of scenes for the film, though not all of them were actually used.

The film premiered at the 29th Fantasia International Film Festival in July 2025, where Glassman received a special jury mention from the Best Canadian Director Award jury. The film was also awarded Best Editing at the 2025 Brooklyn Horror Film Festival.

Glassman additionally shot several promotional videos for the festival program, featuring characters from the film to highlight both Buffet Infinity and other films.

== Plot ==
A local restaurant begins facing opposition from the new and mysterious Buffet Infinity restaurant. While offering incredible prices, questions begin to arise about the buffet when townspeople begin going missing and the restaurant expands and shows up in unexpected places. Through commercials and news segments that present as found footage, it becomes clear that Buffet Infinity may be more than just a restaurant. While a local author and philosopher tries to warn those who can still fight back, a personal injury lawyer works to stay on the right side of the entity, and Ahmed's Pawn Shop just tries to stay in business.

== Cast ==
- Kevin Singh as Mosley Rosin
- Ahmed Ahmed
- Brandon Vanderwall as Brandon
- Jules Balluffi
- Ben Bauce
- Allison Bench as Jennifer Joy Avery
- Noah Brooder
- Darek Burdziuk
- Kelly Calwill
- Kheriyae Christian
- Chad Curtis
- Demi Dupri
- Aaron Guimond
- Suzanne Hube
- Adriaan Kriel
- Patrick Lynn
- Isabella MacLean
- Heather Morgan
- Rylan Nilsson
- Nathan Boyer

== Release ==
=== Critical reception ===
On the review aggregator website Rotten Tomatoes, 100% of 15 critics' reviews are positive.
