= Send Kelp! =

2024 Canadian documentary film

- Directed by: Blake McWilliam
- Written by: Blake McWilliam
- Produced by: Blake McWilliam
- Starring: Frances Ward
- Cinematography: Aaron Munson
- Edited by: Krystal Moss
- Music by: Jonathan Kawchuk
- Production company: Back Road Productions
- Release date: February 2024 (SBIFF)
- Running time: 86 minutes
- Country: Canada
- Language: English

Send Kelp! is a Canadian documentary film, directed by Blake McWilliam and released in 2024. The film centres on Frances Ward, a woman who decided to deal with her fears about the world's environmental future by launching a kelp farm on Vancouver Island to contribute to replenishing the Pacific Ocean ecosystem.

The film premiered at the 39th Santa Barbara International Film Festival.

== Awards ==
Jonathan Krawchuk received a Canadian Screen Music Award nomination for Best Original Score for a Documentary Feature Film in 2024.
