= Vancouver Film Critics Circle Award for Best British Columbia Director =

Canadian film award

The Vancouver Film Critics Circle presents an award for Best British Columbia Director as part of its annual critics awards program, honouring the best director of a film made within the Canadian province of British Columbia within the previous year.

== Winners and nominees ==
Year	Director	Film	Ref.
2022	Anthony Shim	Riceboy Sleeps	
2022	Teresa Alfield	Doug and the Slugs and Me	
2022	Sophie Jarvis	Until Branches Bend	
2023	Meredith Hama-Brown	Seagrass	
2023	Laura Adkin	Re: Uniting	
2023	Tyler Funk	Anything for Fame	
2023	Sherren Lee	Float	
2024	Ann Marie Fleming	Can I Get a Witness?	
2024	Liz Cairns	Inedia	
2024	Jerome Yoo	Mongrels	
2025	Nic Collar	Forward	
2025	Tasha Hubbard	Meadowlarks	
2025	Sophy Romvari	Blue Heron	
2025	Ava Maria Safai	Foreigner	
