= Daughters of Chibok =

Nigerian short film

- Film poster
- Directed by: Joel Kachi Benson
- Music by: Cobhams Asuquo
- Production company: VR360 Stories
- Release date: September 2019 (Venice)
- Running time: 11 minutes
- Country: Nigeria
- Languages: Hausa, English

Daughters of Chibok is an 11-minute Nigerian short film. The virtual reality documentary tells the story of Yana Galang, whose daughter, Rifkatu, was among the 276 girls kidnapped by Boko Haram in April 2014 from their school dormitory in Chibok, northeast Nigeria. The film was made to commemorate the fifth anniversary of the Chibok schoolgirls kidnapping.

== Awards ==
The documentary won "The Best VR Story" at the 2019 Venice Film Festival.
