= Fak Yaass =

Television miniseries

- Genre: Comedy drama
- Created by: Vasilios Filippakis
- Written by: Anthony Filangeri
- Directed by: Matthew McLaughlin
- Starring: Vasilios Filippakis; Leanne Noelle Smith; Nicholas Combitsis; Helen Hayden; Stephanie Herrera; Shadrack Jackman
- Country of origin: Canada
- Original language: English
- No. of seasons: 1
- No. of episodes: 2

Production
- Executive producer: Les Tomlin
- Producers: Vasilios Filippakis; Matthew McLaughlin; Leanne Noelle Smith
- Running time: 22 minutes
- Production company: Bulldog productions

Original release
- Network: OutTV
- Release: June 17 – June 24, 2019

Fak Yaass is a Canadian television miniseries, which premiered in 2019 on OutTV. The series stars Vasilios Filippakis as Nico Nicolakis, a young gay man living in Toronto who is summoned home to Tecumseh by his Greek Canadian family to help take care of his ailing grandfather.

The cast also includes Nicholas Combitsis, Helen Hayden, Stephanie Herrera, Shadrack Jackman, Steve Kaklamanos, Leanne Noelle Smith, Liz Taylor and Charlie David. The series was directed by Matthew McLaughlin for Bulldog Productions.

The series title is a pun referencing both "fak yaas", an expression of approval common in contemporary LGBTQ culture, and fakes, a traditional Greek lentil soup.

The series premiered on June 17, 2019, on OutTV as a two-part miniseries, and is also distributed as a ten-part web series on the channel's streaming platform OutTVGo.
