= Nesting (2025 film) =

- French: Peau à peau
- Directed by: Chloé Cinq-Mars
- Screenplay by: Chloé Cinq-Mars
- Produced by: Nicolas Comeau; Jean-Marc Fröhle
- Starring: Rose-Marie Perreault; Simon Landry-Désy; Saladin Dellers
- Cinematography: Léna Mill-Reuillard
- Edited by: Elric Robichon
- Music by: Nicolas Rabaeus
- Production companies: 1976 Productions; Point Prod
- Release date: July 22, 2025 (Fantasia)
- Running time: 91 minutes
- Country: Canada
- Language: French

Nesting (French: Peau à peau, lit. "Skin to Skin") is a Canadian thriller film, directed by Chloé Cinq-Mars and released in 2025. The film stars Rose-Marie Perreault as Pénélope, a new mother who witnesses a violent robbery that triggers memories of the long-ago death of her younger sister Charlotte (Marie Bélanger), driving her into a deep post-partum depression.

The cast also includes Simon Landry-Désy as her husband Gaspard, and Saladin Dellers as Edward, a former boyfriend of Pénélope's who wants to rekindle their relationship despite Pénélope's marriage.

The film was shot in summer 2023, under the working title Oublier Charlotte. It was partially inspired by Cinq-Mars's own experience of post-partum depression following the birth of her first child.

The film premiered at the 29th Fantasia International Film Festival in July 2025, where Cinq-Mars won the award for Best Canadian Director.
