= Joel Kachi Benson =

Nigerian documentary filmmaker

- Education: Central Film School, Aptech
- Occupation: Filmmaker

Joel Kachi Benson is a Nigerian documentary filmmaker and virtual reality content creator. In 2019, he produced Daughters of Chibok, a virtual reality film on the Chibok schoolgirls kidnapping. He is the Creative Director of virtual reality film studios VR360 Stories in Lagos, Nigeria.

== Background and career ==
Benson is from Aba, Abia state. He attended Pampers Private School Lagos, College of the Immaculate Conception, Enugu and Umuagbai Secondary School, Aba. He has a diploma certificate in software engineering and a certificate in Information Systems Management from Aptech. He also has a Certificate in Filmmaking Central Film School, London.

In 2018, Benson produced In Bakassi, the first VR documentary by a Nigerian filmmaker. The film tells the story of an orphaned boy living with PTSD in one of the largest camps for Internally Displaced Persons in Maiduguri, Borno State. In Bakassi premiered at the Cairo Film Festival in November 2018, and also screened at the Berlin Film Festival and Hot Docs Canadian International Documentary Festival. In 2019, Benson produced Daughters of Chibok, which premiered at the Venice International Film Festival, and won the Venice Lion for Best Immersive Story (Linear), making Benson the first African filmmaker to win the Venice Lion in this category.

== Awards ==
At the 2019 Venice International Film Festival, his film Daughters of Chibok, won "The Best VR Story" award becoming the first African to win the award.

In December 2019, Kachi Benson was named among the New African magazine's Top 100 Most Influential Africans. In February 2020, Daughters of Chibok, was listed on the Forbes Top 50 XR Experiences of 2019.

== Filmography ==
Year	Title
2013	Olu Amoda: A Metallic Journey
2014	JD Okhai Ojeikere: Master Photographer
2018	In Bakassi
2019	Daughters of Chibok
