= Vancouver Film Critics Circle One to Watch Award =

Canadian film award

The Vancouver Film Critics Circle One to Watch Award is a Canadian film award, presented as part of the Vancouver Film Critics Circle's annual awards program to honour breakthrough work by emerging filmmakers and performers in the Canadian film industry.

First presented in 2014 as Best First Canadian Film and awarded exclusively to first-time directors, the award was renamed to "One to Watch" in 2017, with its focus expanded at that time to permit the award to honour breakout performances and non-debut works.

The winner of the award receives a $500 prize from Telefilm Canada.

== Winners and nominees ==
=== 2010s ===
Year	Honoree	Film	Ref.
2014	Andrew Huculiak	Violent	
2014	Kyle Thomas	The Valley Below	
2014	Ana Valine	Sitting on the Edge of Marlene	
2015	Andrew Cividino	Sleeping Giant	
2015	Lindsay MacKay	Wet Bum	
2015	Kurt Walker	Hit 2 Pass	
2016	Ashley McKenzie	Werewolf	
2016	Sofia Bohdanowicz	Never Eat Alone	
2016	Kevan Funk	Hello Destroyer	
2017	Cody Bown	Gregoire	
2017	Winston DeGiobbi	Mass for Shut-Ins	
2017	Seth A. Smith	The Crescent	
2018	Katherine Jerkovic	Roads in February (Les routes en février)	
2018	Drew Lint	M/M	
2018	Jasmin Mozaffari	Firecrackers	
2018	Akash Sherman	Clara	
2019	Matthew Rankin	The Twentieth Century	
2019	Elle-Máijá Tailfeathers	The Body Remembers When the World Broke Open	
2019	Heather Young	Murmur	

=== 2020s ===
Year	Honoree	Film	Ref.
2020	Titus Heckel	Chained	
2020	Kiawenti:io Tarbell	Beans	
2020	Jessie Anthony	Brother, I Cry	
2021	Trevor Mack	Portraits from a Fire	
2021	Pavle Čemerikić	The White Fortress (Tabija)	
2021	Elizabeth Lazebnik	Be Still	
2022	Anthony Shim	Riceboy Sleeps	
2022	Grace Glowicki	Until Branches Bend	
2022	Dohyun Noel Hwang	Riceboy Sleeps	
2022	Sophie Jarvis	Until Branches Bend	
2023	Ariane Louis-Seize	Humanist Vampire Seeking Consenting Suicidal Person (Vampire humaniste cherche suicidaire consentant)	
2023	Meredith Hama-Brown	Seagrass	
2023	Jenny Lee-Gilmore	Overtime	
2023	Ally Pankiw	I Used to Be Funny	
2024	Keira Jang	Can I Get a Witness?	
2024	Megan Park	My Old Ass	
2024	Jerome Yoo	Mongrels	
2025	Sophy Romvari	Blue Heron	
2025	Nicole Bazuin	Modern Whore	
2025	Alex Lee Williams, Mallory Drumm, Jay Drakulic	Dream Eater	
