= Amélie Ravalec =

French filmmaker

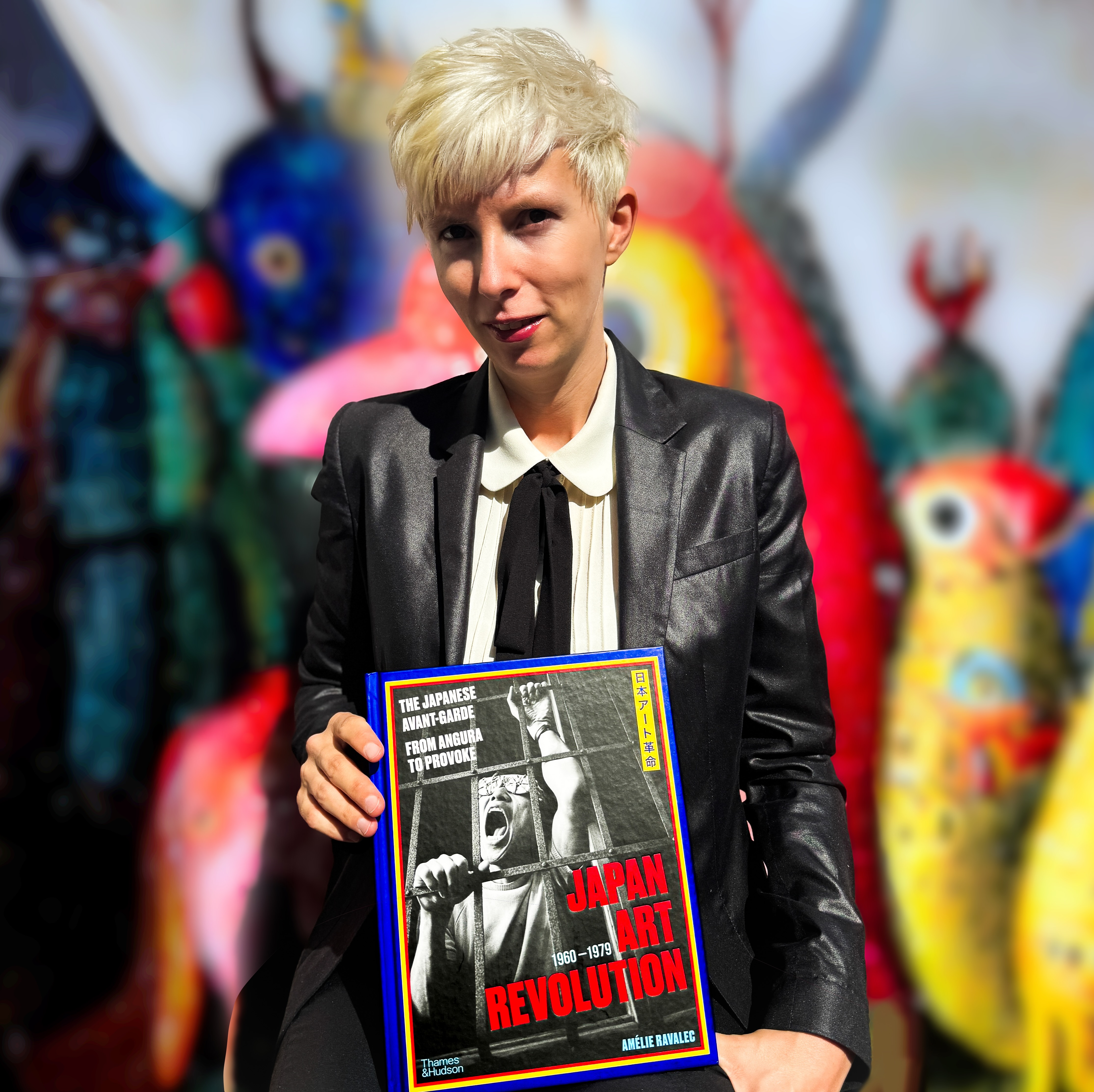
- Born: Paris, France
- Occupations: Filmmaker, photographer, editor, colourist
- Years active: 2012–present
- Known for: Japanese Avant-Garde Pioneers (2025), Art & Mind (2019), Industrial Soundtrack for the Urban Decay (2015), Paris/Berlin: 20 Years of Underground Techno (2012)

Amélie Ravalec is a French filmmaker, photographer, editor and colourist based in London. She is known for her documentaries on avant-garde, underground and experimental art and music, including Japanese Avant-Garde Pioneers (2025), Art & Mind (2019), Industrial Soundtrack for the Urban Decay (2015) and Paris/Berlin: 20 Years of Underground Techno (2012). Her films have been screened internationally at institutions including the British Film Institute, the Smithsonian Institution, EYE Film Institute and Musée Guimet, and have been broadcast on ARTE, Sky Arts and ORF Austria.

Ravalec is the author and book designer of Japan Art Revolution: The Japanese Avant-Garde from Angura to Provoke, published in 2025 by Thames & Hudson and launched at The Photographers' Gallery in London.

She is co-founder of Circle Time Studio, a creative production company working across film, new technologies and immersive exhibitions, and founder of Lone Gentlemen Publishing, an independent imprint producing limited-edition art and photography books and prints. She also works internationally as a senior freelance colourist in advertising, film and television.

Ravalec began her career in electronic music culture, co-founding the record label and events platform Fondation Sonore in 2011 with Gregorio Sicurezza, She is also a DJ, and has released mixes for platforms including The Quietus, The Brvtalist and the XLR8R podcast.

== Films ==
=== Paris/Berlin: 20 Years of Underground Techno (2012) ===
Paris/Berlin: 20 Years of Underground Techno is Ravalec's debut feature documentary. The film traces the rise of underground techno culture in Paris and Berlin from the early 1990s onwards, featuring interviews with DJs, producers, and artists including Laurent Garnier, Regis, Adam X, Ancient Methods, Function, Lucy and Terence Fixmer.

==== Reception ====
Writing in Fact Magazine, Joe Muggs described the film as offering a view of "what has made [underground techno] so resilient and consistently relevant over all these years." Trax Magazine also covered the film on its French release.

=== Industrial Soundtrack for the Urban Decay (2015) ===
Industrial Soundtrack for the Urban Decay is a documentary co-directed by Amélie Ravalec and Travis Collins. The film examines the origins and development of industrial music in the late 1970s and 1980s, featuring interviews with Throbbing Gristle, Cabaret Voltaire, Graeme Revell of SPK, Boyd Rice of NON, Test Dept, Clock DVA, V. Vale of Re/Search, Z'EV, The Klinik, Click Click, Sordide Sentimental, Hula, Orphx and In the Nursery.

==== Screenings ====
The world premiere took place at the British Film Institute on 8 May 2015, followed by a Q&A with the directors alongside Chris Carter and Cosey Fanni Tutti, with a DJ set by Test Dept.

==== Reception ====
In Film Comment, Nicolas Rapold described the film as "the first documentary to trace the origins of industrial music," praising its "impressive roster of interview subjects." The Guardian characterised it as a "whistlestop tour of the genre's genesis." Pitchfork and The Wire also covered the film on release.

=== Art & Mind (2019) ===
Art & Mind is a feature documentary exploring the relationship between art, mental illness and visionary creativity, tracing depictions of madness from the Renaissance through Symbolism, Surrealism, Art Brut and contemporary outsider art. The film features discussion of artists including Hieronymus Bosch, Van Gogh, Salvador Dalí, William Blake, Edvard Munch, Adolf Wölfli and Bryan Charnley, drawing on over 350 artworks from public collections including Tate Britain, Musée d'Art Moderne de Paris, the Prinzhorn Collection, the Wellcome Collection and the Bethlem Museum of the Mind.

==== Screenings ====
The world premiere took place on 27 April 2019 at the ICA in London, co-presented with the Freud Museum. The film was broadcast on Sky Arts in the United Kingdom and ORF in Austria.

==== Reception ====
Raw Vision described the film as "an unparalleled chronicle, a journey into haunting, haunted places." The French psychology review Le Cercle Psy also published a response to the film.

=== Japanese Avant-Garde Pioneers (2025) ===
Japanese Avant-Garde Pioneers is a feature documentary produced by Circle Time Studio, co-produced by Whatsopp Inc. and Maaserhit Honda. The film examines the explosion of radical creativity in Japan during the 1960s and 1970s across experimental photography, underground theatre, Butoh dance, graphic design and performance art. It draws on interviews and archival material featuring figures including Moriyama Daidō, Araki Nobuyoshi, Hosoe Eikoh, Ishiuchi Miyako, Tanaami Keiichi, Yokoo Tadanori, Terayama Shūji, Hijikata Tatsumi and Ōno Kazuo.

==== Screenings ====
The film premiered in 2025 and screened at festivals and cultural institutions including Visions du Réel (Nyon), Japan Cuts Festival (New York), the Smithsonian Institution (Washington), L'Étrange Festival (Paris), Fantasia Festival (Montreal), M+ (Hong Kong), Musée Guimet (Paris), De Balie (Amsterdam), Rich Mix (London), Arnolfini (Bristol) and the Hollywood Theatre (Portland).

==== Reception ====
Dazed described the film as "not an art documentary in the traditional sense, but something more visceral and disorienting." Nikkei Asia wrote that the film opens "a portal into a phantasmagorical world that is grotesque, erotic, dangerous... yet also comical, exciting and unforgettable." Engelsberg Ideas called it "a remarkable film, capturing the spirit of Japan's avant-garde through its protagonists and their vivid, sometimes mind-bending work." At Fantasia Festival the film was described as "a carefully contextualized art-history lesson and a mesmerizing visual journey." Additional coverage appeared in Eastern Kicks, Cinema Daily US, Japan Society and AnOther Magazine. Asian Movie Pulse included the film in its list of the 15 best Asian documentaries of 2025, describing it as "not just a must-see for art enthusiasts but also for anyone interested in the expressive and sociopolitical power of art."

=== Solstice / Sumarsólstöður (2025) ===
Sumarsólstöður is the pilot episode of the Solstice series, a speculative fiction project under development by Circle Time Studio. The narrative follows Miho, a Japanese art researcher whose recurring dreams connect her to a force called the Architecture, drawing together artists across the world into a cosmic struggle. The film blurs the boundary between dreams and reality, and engages themes of environmental crisis, collective consciousness and mythology.

==== Awards and Festivals ====
Since its release in 2025, Sumarsólstöður has been selected for international film festivals across Europe, Asia and the Americas, including the Santa Monica Film Festival (USA), Tokyo International Short Film Festival (Japan), Brooklyn SciFi Film Festival (USA) and Butohpolis (Poland). The pilot won awards including Best Series Pilot at the New York Metropolitan Screenwriting Competition & Film Awards (USA), Best Sci-Fi at the London Global Film Awards (UK) and Swedish International Film Festival (Sweden), and Best Director at the Fantasy Sci-Fi Festival (Canada).

==== Reception ====
La Spirale described the film as "a cinematic vision... a journey as interstellar as 2001's hallucinations, as mystical as The Matrix."

=== Labyrinth of the Unseen World (2025) ===
Labyrinth of the Unseen World is a hybrid dance-theatre and film work created in collaboration with Butoh dancer and performance artist Paul Michael Henry. The piece combines live Butoh dance with film, music, sound design, video art, poetry and vocal narrative. The project was supported by Creative Scotland and had its world premiere at Butohpolis in 2025.

Fjord Review described it as "a hallucinatory, disturbing, yet beautiful dreamscape that fuses visual poetry with dance performance." Creatrix Mag called it "a haunting meditation on fractured truth and blurred identities."

=== Short films ===
Ravalec has directed several experimental short films in collaboration with international Butoh dancers.

The Amorphous Man-Statue (2024), created with Italian performer Donato Simone, follows a figure who awakens after a thousand years in a garden of monsters.

IKIRYŌ 生霊 (2024), featuring Japanese dancer Shota Inoue, depicts a mythical being emerging from the core of the earth on an Icelandic glacier.

BUTŌ: The Recurring Torments of the Pugilist (2022) features dancers Max Cookward and Paul Scott-Bullen alongside boxer Andrew Downer, exploring the physicality of the human body through dance and combat.

== Book ==
=== Japan Art Revolution (2025) ===
Japan Art Revolution: The Japanese Avant-Garde from Angura to Provoke is a monograph on post-war Japanese art authored and designed by Ravalec, published by Thames & Hudson in 2025. The book covers radical artistic movements that emerged in 1960s and 1970s Japan, spanning photography, performance, graphic design and alternative culture, and includes over 600 images and profiles of artists including Moriyama Daido, Araki Nobuyoshi, Hosoe Eikoh, Yokoo Tadanori and Terayama Shūji.

The book was launched at The Photographers' Gallery in London.

Publishers Weekly described it as "an energetic, eye-popping peek into the history of the Asian avant-garde." Japan Nakama called it "the first sweeping, English-language overview of this cross-pollinating scene... accessible and properly encyclopedic." Creative Boom also covered its publication.

The book was selected as a winner of the AIGA 50 Books | 50 Covers 2025, one of the longest-running and most prestigious book design awards in the United States, with the winning entries entering the permanent collection at Columbia University's Rare Book & Manuscript Library.

== Photography ==
=== Invocations of Flesh ===
Alongside her film and publishing work, Ravalec maintains a photographic practice centred on the body, ritual and transformation. Her series Invocations of Flesh comprises hand-painted photographs made in close collaboration with Butoh dancers and performers, exploring states of tension, trance and physical intensity. Subjects for the series include Ichihara Akihito of Sankai Juku and dancer and performance artist Paul Michael Henry.

In 2025, Ravalec was selected as one of 20 artists for the IPFA Award, run by the International Photography Festivals Association. Selected from an international open call reviewed by curators and festival directors from 20 countries, the award places each selected artist in a solo exhibition at an international photography festival. The series Invocations of Flesh was presented as her first solo exhibition as a photographer under this programme.

== Publishing ==
In 2018, Ravalec founded Lone Gentlemen Publishing, an independent imprint producing limited-edition art and photography books and prints, distributed internationally via Antenne Books.

Selected titles include:

- Japan Visions (2018)
- Wraiths of New York City (2020)
- A Compendium of Marvels (2020)
- Beneath the Autumn Leaves (2021)
- BUTŌ: The Recurring Torments of the Pugilist (2022)
- Fragments of the Human Condition (2023)
- Posthuman Codex (2023)
- The Amorphous Man-Statue (2024)
