= Meredith Hama-Brown =

Canadian actress and filmmaker

Meredith Hama-Brown is a Canadian actress and filmmaker from Vancouver, British Columbia. She is known for her full-length feature film debut, Seagrass, which premiered in the Discovery program at the 2023 Toronto International Film Festival, winning the FIPRESCI Prize.

== Career ==
Hama-Brown first attracted attention for her short film titled Broken Bunny, which won the Sea to Sky Award at the 2018 Vancouver International Film Festival.

Her music video for Alaskan Tapes's song "And, We Disappear" was nominated for the Prism Prize in 2020.

In 2022, her performance as Maddie in the film Be Still, for which she won the Leo Award for Best Supporting Performance by a Female in a Motion Picture.

Her full-length feature film debut, Seagrass, premiered in the Discovery program at the 2023 Toronto International Film Festival, winning the FIPRESCI Prize. The film, starring Ally Maki, Luke Roberts, Chris Pang, Sarah Gadon, and Nyha Huang Breitkreuz, among others, also screened at the 2023 Cinéfest Sudbury International Film Festival, the 2023 Vancouver International Film Festival, and the 2023 Atlantic International Film Festival, winning Outstanding Canadian Feature Film at Cinéfest. For her work on Seagrass, she also won several Vancouver Film Critics Awards including Best British Columbia Film, Best British Columbia Director, and Best Supporting Actress in a Canadian Film.
