= Vancouver Film Critics Circle Award for Best Foreign Language Film =

Canadian film award

The winners of the Vancouver Film Critics Circle Award for Best Foreign Language Film are listed below:

== Winners and nominees ==
=== 2000s ===
Year	Winners and nominees	Original title	Country	Director(s)	Ref
2002	Talk to Her	Hable con ella	Spain	Pedro Almodóvar	
2002	And Your Mother Too	Y Tu Mamá También	Mexico	Alfonso Cuarón	
2002	Mostly Martha	Bella Martha	Germany	Sandra Nettelbeck	
2003	City of God	Cidade de Deus	Brazil	Fernando Meirelles	
2003	L'Auberge Espagnole	L'Auberge Espagnole	France/Spain	Cédric Klapisch	
2003	The Triplets of Belleville	Les Triplettes de Belleville	France/Canada	Sylvain Chomet	
2004	A Very Long Engagement	Un long dimanche de fiançailles	France	Jean-Pierre Jeunet	
2004	Maria Full of Grace	María, llena eres de gracia	Colombia	Joshua Marston	
2004	The Motorcycle Diaries	Diarios de motocicleta	Argentina	Walter Salles	
2005	Paradise Now	الجنّة الآن	Palestine	Hany Abu-Assad	
2005	Downfall	Der Untergang	Germany	Oliver Hirschbiegel	
2005	Kung Fu Hustle	功夫	Hong Kong	Stephen Chow	
2006	Volver		Spain	Pedro Almodóvar	
2006	The Child	L'Enfant	Belgium	Jean-Pierre and Luc Dardenne	
2006	Letters from Iwo Jima	硫黄島からの手紙	United States/Japan	Clint Eastwood	
2007	4 Months, 3 Weeks and 2 Days	4 luni, 3 săptămâni și 2 zile	Romania	Cristian Mungiu	
2007	The Diving Bell and the Butterfly	Le Scaphandre et le papillon	France	Julian Schnabel	
2007	Persepolis	Persepolis	France	Marjane Satrapi, Vincent Paronnaud	
2008	The Edge of Heaven	Auf der anderen Seite	Germany	Fatih Akin	
2008	Let the Right One In	Låt den rätte komma in	Sweden	Tomas Alfredson	
2008	Tell No One	Ne le dis à personne	France	Guillaume Canet	
2009	Summer Hours	L'Heure d'été	France	Olivier Assayas	
2009	Broken Embraces	Los abrazos rotos	Spain	Pedro Almodóvar	
2009	The Headless Woman	La mujer sin cabeza / La mujer rubia	Argentina	Lucrecia Martel	

=== 2010s ===
Year	Winner and nominees	Original title	Country	Director(s)	Ref
2010	Carlos		France	Olivier Assayas	
2010	Mother	마더	South Korea	Bong Joon-ho	
2010	A Prophet	Un prophète	France	Jacques Audiard	
2010	The Secret in Their Eyes	El secreto de sus ojos	Argentina	Juan José Campanella	
2011	A Separation	جدایی نادر از سیمین	Iran	Asghar Farhadi	
2011	Poetry	시	South Korea	Lee Chang-dong	
2011	The Kid with a Bike	Le Gamin au vélo	Belgium	Jean-Pierre Dardenne and Luc Dardenne	
2012	Holy Motors		France	Leos Carax	
2012	Amour		France/Austria	Michael Haneke	
2012	The Intouchables	Intouchables	France	Éric Toledano and Olivier Nakache	
2013	The Hunt	Jagten	Denmark	Thomas Vinterberg	
2013	Blancanieves		Spain	Pablo Berger	
2013	Blue is the Warmest Colour	La Vie d'Adèle – Chapitres 1 & 2	France	Abdellatif Kechiche	
2014	Force Majeure	Turist	Sweden	Ruben Östlund	
2014	Ida		Poland	Paweł Pawlikowski	
2014	We Are the Best!	Vi är bäst!	Sweden	Lukas Moodysson	
2015	The Assassin	刺客聶隱娘	Taiwan	Hou Hsiao-hsien	
2015	Goodnight Mommy	Ich seh, Ich seh	Austria	Veronika Franz and Severin Fiala	
2015	Son of Saul	Saul fia	Hungary	László Nemes	
2016	Toni Erdmann		Germany	Maren Ade	
2016	Elle		France	Paul Verhoeven	
2016	The Handmaiden	아가씨	South Korea	Chan-wook Park	
2017	BPM (Beats per Minute)	120 battements par minute	France	Robin Campillo	
2017	A Fantastic Woman	Una mujer fantástica	Chile	Sebastián Lelio	
2017	The Square		Sweden	Ruben Östlund	
2018	Roma		Mexico	Alfonso Cuarón	
2018	Burning	버닝	South Korea	Lee Chang-dong	
2018	Shoplifters	万引き家族	Japan	Hirokazu Kore-eda	
2019	Parasite	기생충	South Korea	Bong Joon-ho	
2019	The Farewell	別告訴她	United States	Lulu Wang	
2019	Pain and Glory	Dolor y gloria	Spain	Pedro Almodóvar	

=== 2020s ===
Year	Winner and nominees	Original title	Country	Director(s)	Ref
2020	Minari	미나리	United States	Lee Isaac Chung	
2020	Another Round	Druk	Denmark	Thomas Vinterberg	
2020	Dear Comrades!	Dorogie tovarishchi!	Russia	Andrei Konchalovsky	
2021	The Worst Person in the World	Verdens verste menneske	Norway	Joachim Trier	
2021	Flee	Flugt	Denmark	Jonas Poher Rasmussen	
2021	Riders of Justice	Retfærdighedens Ryttere	Denmark	Anders Thomas Jensen	
2022	All Quiet on the Western Front	Im Westen nichts Neues	Germany	Edward Berger	
2022	Holy Spider	Ankabut-e moqaddas	Germany, Denmark, France, Sweden	Ali Abbasi	
2022	RRR		India	S. S. Rajamouli	
2023	The Zone of Interest		United States, United Kingdom, Poland	Jonathan Glazer	
2023	Anatomy of a Fall	Anatomie d'une chute	France	Justine Triet	
2023	Society of the Snow	La sociedad de la nieve	Spain, United States	J. A. Bayona	
2024	Flow	Straume	Latvia, France, Belgium	Gints Zilbalodis	
2024	All We Imagine as Light		France, India, Luxembourg, Netherlands, Italy	Payal Kapadia	
2024	Emilia Pérez		France	Jacques Audiard	
