= Liz Cairns =

Canadian film director

Liz Cairns is a Canadian film director and production designer from Vancouver, British Columbia. She is most noted as a production designer on the 2017 film Never Steady, Never Still, for which she and Sophie Jarvis received a Canadian Screen Award nomination for Best Art Direction/Production Design at the 6th Canadian Screen Awards in 2018, and for her 2021 short film The Horses, which won the award for Best British Columbia Short Film at the 2021 Vancouver International Film Festival.

Her debut feature film, Inedia, entered production in 2022, and premiered at the 2024 Vancouver International Film Festival. The film was longlisted for the 2024 Jean-Marc Vallée DGC Discovery Award.

== Filmography ==
- Sad Bear - 2010, with Joe LoBianco
- Withering Heights - 2014
- My Favourite Season - 2015
- His Name Is Willy - 2017
- The Horses - 2021
- Inedia - 2024
