= Inedia (film) =

- Directed by: Liz Cairns
- Screenplay by: Liz Cairns
- Produced by: Tyler Hagan; Jennifer Chiu
- Starring: Amy Forsyth; Susanne Wuest
- Cinematography: Jeremy Cox
- Edited by: Lisa Pham
- Music by: Jesse Zubot; Josh Zubot
- Production company: Experimental Forest Films
- Distributed by: Vortex Media
- Release date: September 27, 2024 (VIFF)
- Running time: 109 minutes
- Country: Canada
- Language: English

Inedia is a Canadian drama film, directed by Liz Cairns and released in 2024. The film stars Amy Forsyth as Cora, a woman who begins developing new food allergies and intolerances, and joins a radical community of people who profess the philosophy of inedia, or the belief that people can survive without food, and require only exposure to light to thrive.

The cast also includes Rachel Drance, Susanne Wuest, Eric Gustafsson, Eric Sebastian, Hilda Martin, Jane McGregor, Bahareh Yaraghi, Vasilios Filippakis, Chelsea Brown, Lynnette Kissoon, Nova Brown, Rochelle Allison and Sara Rabey in supporting roles.

The film premiered at the 2024 Vancouver International Film Festival.

The film was longlisted for the 2024 Jean-Marc Vallée DGC Discovery Award.
