= Vancouver Film Critics Circle Award for Best Screenplay =

Canadian film award

The Vancouver Film Critics Circle Award for Best Screenplay is an annual award given by the Vancouver Film Critics Circle.

== Winners and nominees ==
=== 2000s ===
Year	Winners	Film	Ref
2009	Jason Reitman and Sheldon Turner	Up in the Air	
2009	Mark Boal	The Hurt Locker	
2009	Quentin Tarantino	Inglourious Basterds	

=== 2010s ===
Year	Winners	Film	Ref
2010	Aaron Sorkin	The Social Network	
2010	Joel Coen and Ethan Coen	True Grit	
2010	Christopher Nolan	Inception	
2011	Michel Hazanavicius	The Artist	
2011	Woody Allen	Midnight in Paris	
2011	Alexander Payne, Nat Faxon, and Jim Rash	The Descendants	
2011	Aaron Sorkin and Steven Zaillian	Moneyball	
2012	Mark Boal	Zero Dark Thirty	
2012	Tony Kushner	Lincoln	
2012	Quentin Tarantino	Django Unchained	
2013	Joel Coen and Ethan Coen	Inside Llewyn Davis	
2013	Spike Jonze	Her	
2013	John Ridley	12 Years a Slave	
2014	Wes Anderson	The Grand Budapest Hotel	
2014	Alejandro G. Iñárritu, Nicolás Giacobone, Alexander Dinelaris Jr., and Armando Bo	Birdman or (The Unexpected Virtue of Ignorance)	
2014	Richard Linklater	Boyhood	
2015	Charlie Kaufman	Anomalisa	
2015	Emma Donoghue	Room	
2015	Tom McCarthy and Josh Singer	Spotlight	
2016	Kenneth Lonergan	Manchester by the Sea	
2016	Barry Jenkins	Moonlight	
2016	Taylor Sheridan	Hell or High Water	
2017	Jordan Peele	Get Out	
2017	Greta Gerwig	Lady Bird	
2017	Martin McDonagh	Three Billboards Outside Ebbing, Missouri	
2018	Paul Schrader	First Reformed	
2018	Bo Burnham	Eighth Grade	
2018	Deborah Davis and Tony McNamara	The Favourite	
2019	Noah Baumbach	Marriage Story	
2019	Bong Joon-ho and Han Jin-won	Parasite	
2019	Quentin Tarantino	Once Upon a Time in Hollywood	

=== 2020s ===
Year	Winners	Film	Ref
2020	Aaron Sorkin	The Trial of the Chicago 7	
2020	Emerald Fennell	Promising Young Woman	
2020	Jack Fincher	Mank	
2021	Adam McKay and David Sirota	Don't Look Up	
2021	Kenneth Branagh	Belfast	
2021	Maggie Gyllenhaal	The Lost Daughter	
2022	Martin McDonagh	The Banshees of Inisherin	
2022	Todd Field	Tár	
2022	Daniel Kwan and Daniel Scheinert	Everything Everywhere All at Once	
2023	Greta Gerwig, Noah Baumbach	Barbie	
2023	Christopher Nolan	Oppenheimer	
2023	Justine Triet, Arthur Harari	Anatomy of a Fall	
2024	Jesse Eisenberg	A Real Pain	
2024	Sean Baker	Anora	
2024	Brady Corbet, Mona Fastvold	The Brutalist	
