= Vancouver Film Critics Circle Award for Best Film =

Canadian film award

The winners of the Vancouver Film Critics Circle Award for Best Film are listed below:

== Winners and nominees ==
=== 2000s ===
Year	Winners and nominees	Director(s)	Ref
2000	Traffic	Steven Soderbergh	
2000	Crouching Tiger, Hidden Dragon	Ang Lee	
2000	You Can Count on Me	Kenneth Lonergan	
2000	Not of this World (Fuori dal mundo)	Giuseppe Piccioni	
2001	Memento	Christopher Nolan	
2001	Amélie (Le fabuleux destin d'Amélie Poulain)	Jean-Pierre Jeunet	
2001	Ghost World	Terry Zwigoff	
2001	Moulin Rouge!	Baz Luhrmann	
2001	Mulholland Drive	David Lynch	
2002	The Hours	Stephen Daldry	
2002	Far from Heaven	Todd Haynes	
2002	Gangs Of New York	Martin Scorsese	
2003	Lost in Translation	Sofia Coppola	
2003	The Lord of the Rings: The Return of the King	Peter Jackson	
2003	Mystic River	Clint Eastwood	
2004	Sideways	Alexander Payne	
2004	The Aviator	Martin Scorsese	
2004	Million Dollar Baby	Clint Eastwood	
2005	Brokeback Mountain	Ang Lee	
2005	Capote	Bennett Miller	
2005	Good Night, and Good Luck.	George Clooney	
2006	Children of Men	Alfonso Cuarón	
2006	The Departed	Martin Scorsese	
2006	Little Children	Todd Field	
2007	No Country for Old Men	Joel and Ethan Coen	
2007	Juno	Jason Reitman	
2007	There Will Be Blood	Paul Thomas Anderson	
2008	Milk	Gus Van Sant	
2008	Slumdog Millionaire	Danny Boyle	
2008	WALL-E	Andrew Stanton	
2009	Up in the Air	Jason Reitman	
2009	The Hurt Locker	Kathryn Bigelow	
2009	A Serious Man	Joel and Ethan Coen	

=== 2010s ===
Year	Winner and nominees	Director(s)	Ref
2010	The Social Network	David Fincher	
2010	Black Swan	Darren Aronofsky	
2010	True Grit	Joel Coen and Ethan Coen	
2011	The Artist	Michel Hazanavicius	
2011	The Descendants	Alexander Payne	
2011	The Tree of Life	Terrence Malick	
2012	Zero Dark Thirty	Kathryn Bigelow	
2012	The Master	Paul Thomas Anderson	
2012	Lincoln	Steven Spielberg	
2013	12 Years a Slave	Steve McQueen	
2013	Gravity	Alfonso Cuarón	
2013	Inside Llewyn Davis	Joel Coen and Ethan Coen	
2014	Boyhood	Richard Linklater	
2014	Birdman or (The Unexpected Virtue of Ignorance)	Alejandro González Iñárritu	
2014	Whiplash	Damien Chazelle	
2015	Spotlight	Tom McCarthy	
2015	Mad Max: Fury Road	George Miller	
2015	The Revenant	Alejandro G. Iñárritu	
2016	Manchester by the Sea	Kenneth Lonergan	
2016	La La Land	Damien Chazelle	
2016	Moonlight	Barry Jenkins	
2017	Lady Bird	Greta Gerwig	
2017	Dunkirk	Christopher Nolan	
2017	Phantom Thread	Paul Thomas Anderson	
2018	Roma	Alfonso Cuaron	
2018	The Favourite	Yorgos Lanthimos	
2018	First Reformed	Paul Schrader	
2019	Parasite	Bong Joon-ho	
2019	Marriage Story	Noah Baumbach	
2019	The Irishman	Martin Scorsese	

=== 2020s ===
Year	Winner and nominees	Director(s)	Ref
2020	Nomadland	Chloé Zhao	
2020	Promising Young Woman	Emerald Fennell	
2020	Mank	David Fincher	
2021	The Power of the Dog	Jane Campion	
2021	Belfast	Kenneth Branagh	
2021	CODA	Sian Heder	
2022	Everything Everywhere All at Once	Daniel Kwan and Daniel Sceinert	
2022	The Banshees of Inisherin	Martin McDonagh	
2022	Tár	Todd Field	
2023	Anatomy of a Fall	Justine Triet	
2023	Oppenheimer	Christopher Nolan	
2023	The Zone of Interest	Jonathan Glazer	
2024	Anora	Sean Baker	
2024	The Brutalist	Brady Corbet	
2024	A Real Pain	Jesse Eisenberg	
