= Vancouver Film Critics Circle =

Annual Canadian film awards

Vancouver Film Critics Circle Awards
- Current: Vancouver Film Critics Circle Awards 2024
- Awarded for: Best Canadian and international films of the year
- Country: Canada
- Presented by: Vancouver Film Critics Circle
- First award: 2000
- Website: Official website

The Vancouver Film Critics Circle (VFCC) was founded in 2000 by David Spaner and Ian Caddell, in order to help promote Canadian films and the British Columbia film and television industry. Its membership includes print, radio, on-line, and television critics, either based in Vancouver or with Vancouver outlets. The current Chair of the VFCC is Jorge Ignacio Castillo, editor in chief of the web platform The Canadian Crew.

== VFCC notable milestones ==
The VFCC celebrated its 13th anniversary of giving awards to the year’s best films on January 7, 2013, at the Railway Club. The event is the only among Canadian critics’ groups that presents a full slate of international awards and a full slate of Canadian awards. The VFCC also presents a Best of British Columbia Award and the Ian Caddell Achievement Award that goes to an individual or group that has made a significant contribution to the local film and television industry.

== Award categories ==
International

- Best Film
- Best Director
- Best Screenplay
- Best Actor
- Best Actress
- Best Supporting Actor
- Best Supporting Actress
- Best Documentary
- Best Foreign Language Film

Canadian

- Best Canadian Film
- Best Canadian Documentary
- Best British Columbia Director
- Best British Columbia Film
- Best Director of a Canadian Film
- Best Screenplay for a Canadian Film
- Best Actor in a Canadian Film
- Best Actress in a Canadian Film
- Best Supporting Actor in a Canadian Film
- Best Supporting Actress in a Canadian Film
- One to Watch
