= 2019 Toronto International Film Festival =

44th edition of Canadian film festival

- Festival poster
- Opening film: Once Were Brothers: Robbie Robertson and The Band by Daniel Roher
- Closing film: Radioactive by Marjane Satrapi
- Location: Toronto, Ontario, Canada
- Founded: 1976
- Awards: Jojo Rabbit (People's Choice Award)
- Festival date: 5–15 September 2019
- Website: tiff.net/tiff

TIFF chronology
- 2020 2018

The 44th annual Toronto International Film Festival was held from 5 to 15 September 2019. The opening gala was the documentary film Once Were Brothers: Robbie Robertson and The Band, directed by Daniel Roher, and the festival closed with a screening of the biographical film Radioactive, directed by Marjane Satrapi.

== Awards ==
In addition to its regular film awards, whose winners were announced at the conclusion of the festival, the festival also announced the inaugural TIFF Tribute Awards, a special program to honour distinguished lifetime achievement in film. Tribute Awards were presented to Meryl Streep and Joaquin Phoenix for acting, Taika Waititi for directing, cinematographer Roger Deakins for artisan film craft, Mati Diop for emerging talent, Participant Media for impact media, and David Foster for special contributions to film.

The first award recipients were announced on 12 September, with the major awards announced at the close of the festival on 15 September. In light of the fact that international filmmakers are rarely still in Toronto to accept their awards in person by the end of the festival, the organizers opted to cancel the traditional awards ceremony, and instead announced the award winners through TIFF's social media.

Nicolas Cage was awarded with the Creative Coalition's Spotlight Initiative Award for his role in Color Out of Space.

Award	Film	Director
People's Choice Award	Jojo Rabbit	Taika Waititi
People's Choice Award, First Runner Up	Marriage Story	Noah Baumbach
People's Choice Award, Second Runner Up	Parasite	Bong Joon-ho
People's Choice Award: Documentary	The Cave	Feras Fayyad
People's Choice Award: Documentary, First Runner Up	I Am Not Alone	Garin Hovannisian
People's Choice Award: Documentary, Second Runner Up	Dads	Bryce Dallas Howard
People's Choice Award: Midnight Madness	The Platform	Galder Gaztelu-Urrutia
People's Choice Award: Midnight Madness, First Runner Up	The Vast of Night	Andrew Patterson
People's Choice Award: Midnight Madness, Second Runner Up	Blood Quantum	Jeff Barnaby
Platform Prize	Martin Eden	Pietro Marcello
Platform Prize, Honorable Mention	Anne at 13,000 Ft.	Kazik Radwanski
Platform Prize, Honorable Mention	Proxima	Alice Winocour
Best Canadian Feature Film	Antigone	Sophie Deraspe
Best Canadian Feature Film, Honourable Mention	The Body Remembers When the World Broke Open	Elle-Máijá Tailfeathers, Kathleen Hepburn
Best Canadian Short Film	Delphine	Chloé Robichaud
Best Canadian Short Film, Honourable Mention	The Physics of Sorrow	Theodore Ushev
Best Canadian First Feature Film	The Twentieth Century	Matthew Rankin
FIPRESCI Discovery Prize	Murmur	Heather Young
FIPRESCI Special Presentations	How to Build a Girl	Coky Giedroyc
Best International Short Film	All Cats Are Grey in the Dark	Lasse Linder
Best International Short Film, Honourable Mention	The Nap	Federico Luis Tachella
NETPAC Award for World or International Asian Film Premiere	1982	Oualid Mouaness

== Programme ==
The selection for the 2019 festival:

=== Gala presentations ===
English title	Original title	Director(s)	Production country
Abominable		Jill Culton	United States, China
The Aeronauts		Tom Harper	United Kingdom, United States
American Woman		Semi Chellas	Canada, United States
A Beautiful Day in the Neighborhood		Marielle Heller	United States
Blackbird		Roger Michell	United States
The Burnt Orange Heresy		Giuseppe Capotondi	United States, Italy
Clemency		Chinonye Chukwu	United States
Ford v Ferrari		James Mangold	United States
The Goldfinch		John Crowley	United States
Harriet		Kasi Lemmons	United States
Honey Boy		Alma Har'el	United States
Hustlers		Lorene Scafaria	United States
Joker		Todd Phillips	United States
Just Mercy		Destin Daniel Cretton	United States
Once Were Brothers: Robbie Robertson and The Band		Daniel Roher	Canada
Radioactive		Marjane Satrapi	United Kingdom
The Sky Is Pink		Shonali Bose	India
The Song of Names		François Girard	Canada, Germany, Hungary, United Kingdom
True History of the Kelly Gang		Justin Kurzel	United Kingdom, Australia
Western Stars		Thom Zimny and Bruce Springsteen	United States

=== Special events ===
English title	Original title	Director(s)	Production country
David Foster: Off the Record		Barry Avrich	Canada
One Day in the Life of Noah Piugattuk		Zacharias Kunuk	Canada

=== Special presentations ===
English title	Original title	Director(s)	Production country
American Son		Kenny Leon	United States
Bad Education		Cory Finley	United States
La Belle Époque		Nicolas Bedos	France
Coming Home Again		Wayne Wang	United States, South Korea
Deerskin	Le Daim	Quentin Dupieux	France
Dirt Music		Gregor Jordan	Australia, United Kingdom
Disappearance at Clifton Hill		Albert Shin	Canada
Dolemite Is My Name		Craig Brewer	United States
The Domain	A Herdade	Tiago Guedes	Portugal, France
The Elder One	Moothon	Geetu Mohandas	India
Ema		Pablo Larraín	Chile
Endings, Beginnings		Drake Doremus	South Korea, United States
Frankie		Ira Sachs	United States, France
The Friend		Gabriela Cowperthwaite	United States
Greed		Michael Winterbottom	United Kingdom, United States
Guest of Honour		Atom Egoyan	Canada
Guns Akimbo		Jason Lei Howden	New Zealand, United Kingdom, Germany
Heroic Losers	La odisea de los giles	Sebastián Borensztein	Argentina
Hope Gap		William Nicholson	United Kingdom
How to Build a Girl		Coky Giedroyc	United Kingdom, United States
Human Capital		Marc Meyers	United States, Italy
I Am Woman		Unjoo Moon	Australia
Jojo Rabbit		Taika Waititi	United States, New Zealand, Czech Republic
Judy		Rupert Goold	United Kingdom, United States, France
Jungleland		Max Winkler	United States
Knives Out		Rian Johnson	United States
The Last Vermeer		Dan Friedkin	United States
The Laundromat		Steven Soderbergh	United States
The Lighthouse		Robert Eggers	Canada, United States
Lucy in the Sky		Noah Hawley	United States
Marriage Story		Noah Baumbach	United States, United Kingdom
Military Wives		Peter Cattaneo	United Kingdom
Mosul		Matthew Michael Carnahan	United States
Motherless Brooklyn		Edward Norton	United States
No.7 Cherry Lane	繼園臺七號	Yonfan	Hong Kong, China
Ordinary Love		Lisa Barros D'Sa and Glenn Leyburn	United Kingdom, Ireland
The Other Lamb		Małgorzata Szumowska	United States, Ireland, Belgium
Pain and Glory	Dolor y gloria	Pedro Almodóvar	Spain
The Painted Bird	Nabarvené ptáče	Václav Marhoul	Czech Republic, Slovakia, Ukraine
Parasite	기생충	Bong Joon-ho	South Korea
Pelican Blood	Pelikanblut	Katrin Gebbe	Germany, Bulgaria
The Personal History of David Copperfield		Armando Iannucci	United Kingdom, United States
Portrait of a Lady on Fire	Portrait de la jeune fille en feu	Céline Sciamma	France
The Report		Scott Z. Burns	United States
Saturday Fiction	兰心大剧院	Lou Ye	China
Seberg		Benedict Andrews	United States, United Kingdom
Sibyl		Justine Triet	France, Belgium
Synchronic		Aaron Moorehead and Justin Benson	United States
The Truth	La Vérité	Hirokazu Kore-eda	France, Japan
The Two Popes		Fernando Meirelles	United Kingdom, United States, Italy
Uncut Gems		Joshua and Benjamin Safdie	United States
Wasp Network		Olivier Assayas	France, Brazil, Spain, Belgium
Waves		Trey Edward Shults	United States
Weathering with You	天気の子	Makoto Shinkai	Japan
While at War	Mientras dure la guerra	Alejandro Amenábar	Spain, Argentina

=== Contemporary World Cinema ===
English title	Original title	Director(s)	Production country
37 Seconds		Hikari	Japan
Adam		Maryam Touzani	Morocco
And the Birds Rained Down	Il pleuvait des oiseaux	Louise Archambault	Canada
Antigone		Sophie Deraspe	Canada
Arab Blues	Un divan à Tunis	Manele Labidi Labbé	France, Tunisia
Atlantics	Atlantique	Mati Diop	Belgium, France, Senegal
Atlantis	Атлантида	Valentyn Vasyanovych	Ukraine
Bacurau		Kleber Mendonça Filho and Juliano Dornelles	Brazil, France
Balloon	气球	Pema Tseden	China
The Barefoot Emperor		Jessica Woodworth and Peter Brosens	Belgium
Beanpole	Дылда	Kantemir Balagov	Russia
Beneath the Blue Suburban Skies		Edward Burns	United States
Blow the Man Down		Danielle Krudy and Bridget Savage Cole	United States
The Body Remembers When the World Broke Open	Malkʼwalaʼmida uḵwineʼ leʼołeʼ yax̱idixa̱nʼs ʼnalax̱	Elle-Máijá Tailfeathers and Kathleen Hepburn	Canada
Bombay Rose		Gitanjali Rao	India
Castle in the Ground		Joey Klein	Canada
Chicuarotes		Gael García Bernal	Mexico
The Climb		Michael Angelo Covino	United States
Corpus Christi	Boże Ciało	Jan Komasa	Poland, France
The County	Héraðið	Grímur Hákonarson	Iceland
Dogs Don't Wear Pants	Koirat eivät käytä housuja	J-P Valkeapää	Finland
The Father	Бащата	Petar Valchanov and Kristina Grozeva	Bulgaria, Greece
Flatland		Jenna Bass	South Africa, Luxembourg, Germany
A Girl Missing	よこがお	Koji Fukada	Japan, France
Hala		Minhal Baig	United States
Henry Glassie: Field Work		Pat Collins	Ireland
Incitement	ימים נוראים	Yaron Zilberman	Israel
Instinct		Halina Reijn	Netherlands
The Invisible Life of Eurídice Gusmão	A Vida Invisível de Eurídice Gusmão	Karim Aïnouz	Brazil, Germany
Jallikattu		Lijo Jose Pellissery	India
Knuckle City		Jahmil X. T. Qubeka	South Africa
La Llorona		Jayro Bustamante	Guatemala
The Last Porno Show		Kire Paputts	Canada
The Long Walk	ບໍ່ມີວັນຈາກ	Mattie Do	Laos
Made in Bangladesh	শিমু	Rubaiyat Hossain	Bangladesh, France, Denmark, Portugal
Mariam		Sharipa Urazbayeva	Kazakhstan, Germany
Maria's Paradise	Marian paratiisi	Zaida Bergroth	Finland
Les Misérables		Ladj Ly	France
Nobadi		Karl Markovics	Austria
Our Lady of the Nile	Notre-Dame du Nil	Atiq Rahimi	France, Belgium, Rwanda, Monaco
The Perfect Candidate	المرشحة المثالية	Haifaa al-Mansour	Saudi Arabia
Red Fields		Keren Yedaya	Israel
Resin	Harpiks	Daniel Borgman	Denmark
So Long, My Son	地久天长	Wang Xiaoshuai	China
South Terminal	Terminal Sud	Rabah Ameur-Zaïmeche	France
Spider	Araña	Andrés Wood	Chile
A Sun	陽光普照	Chung Mong-hong	Taiwan
Synonyms	Synonymes	Nadav Lapid	France, Israel, Germany
Tammy's Always Dying		Amy Jo Johnson	Canada
Three Summers	Três Verões	Sandra Kogut	Brazil
Verdict		Raymund Ribay Gutierrez	Philippines
White Lie		Yonah Lewis and Calvin Thomas	Canada
A White, White Day	Hvítur, Hvítur Dagur	Hlynur Pálmason	Iceland
The Wild Goose Lake	南方车站的聚会	Diao Yinan	China
You Will Die at Twenty	ستموت في العشرين	Amjad Abu Alala	Sudan, France, Egypt, Germany, Norway, Qatar

=== Masters ===
English title	Original title	Director(s)	Production country
About Endlessness	Om det oändliga	Roy Andersson	Sweden
Devil Between the Legs	El Diablo entre las Piernas	Arturo Ripstein	Mexico
A Hidden Life		Terrence Malick	United States, Germany
I Was at Home, But	Ich war zuhause, aber	Angela Schanelec	Germany
It Must Be Heaven	إن شئت كما في السماء	Elia Suleiman	France, Canada, Palestine, Turkey
Jordan River Anderson, the Messenger		Alanis Obomsawin	Canada
Sorry We Missed You		Ken Loach	United Kingdom, France, Belgium
The Traitor	Il traditore	Marco Bellocchio	Italy, France, Brazil, Germany
To the Ends of the Earth	旅のおわり世界のはじまり	Kiyoshi Kurosawa	Japan, Uzbekistan, Qatar
The Whistlers	La Gomera	Corneliu Porumboiu	Romania, France, Germany
Zombi Child		Bertrand Bonello	France

=== Documentaries ===
English title	Original title	Director(s)	Production country
And We Go Green		Fisher Stevens and Malcolm Venville	United States
The Australian Dream		Daniel Gordon	Australia, United Kingdom
Bikram: Yogi, Guru, Predator		Eva Orner	United States
The Capote Tapes		Ebs Burnough	United States, United Kingdom
The Cave		Feras Fayyad	Syria, Denmark
Citizen K		Alex Gibney	United States
Collective	Colectiv	Alexander Nanau	Romania
Coppers		Alan Zweig	Canada
The Cordillera of Dreams	La cordillère des songes	Patricio Guzmán	Chile, France
Cunningham		Alla Kovgan	Germany, France, United Kingdom, United States
Dads		Bryce Dallas Howard	United States
Desert One		Barbara Kopple	United States
I Am Not Alone		Garin Hovannisian	Armenia, United States
Ibrahim: A Fate to Define		Lina Al Abed	Lebanon, Palestine, Denmark, Qatar
The Kingmaker		Lauren Greenfield	United States
Letter to the Editor		Alan Berliner	United States
Love Child		Eva Mulvad	Denmark
My English Cousin		Karim Sayad	Switzerland, Qatar, Algeria
Paris Stalingrad		Hind Meddeb	France
Ready for War		Andrew Renzi	United States
Red Penguins		Gabe Polsky	United States, Russia
Sing Me a Song		Thomas Balmès	France, Germany, Switzerland
There's Something in the Water		Elliot Page and Ian Daniel	Canada
This Is Not a Movie		Yung Chang	Canada
Women Make Film: A New Road Movie Through Cinema		Mark Cousins	United Kingdom

=== Discovery ===
English title	Original title	Director(s)	Production country
1982		Oualid Mouaness	United States, Lebanon, Norway, Qatar
Africa		Oren Gerner	Israel
The Antenna	Bina	Orçun Behram	Turkey
The Audition	Das Vorspiel	Ina Weisse	Germany, France
August	Agosto	Armando Capó	Cuba, Costa Rica, France
Black Conflux		Nicole Dorsey	Canada
Bring Me Home	나를 찾아줘	Kim Seung-woo	South Korea
A Bump Along the Way		Shelly Love	United Kingdom
Calm with Horses		Nick Rowland	United Kingdom, Ireland
Certified Mail	Bi Elm El Wossul	Hisham Saqr	Egypt
Comets		Tamar Shavgulidze	Georgia
Disco		Jorunn Myklebust Syversen	Norway
Easy Land		Sanja Živković	Canada
Entwined		Minos Nikolakakis	Greece
The Giant		David Raboy	United States
The Good Intentions	Las Buenas Intenciones	Ana García Blaya	Argentina
Hearts and Bones		Ben Lawrence	Australia
Hope	Håp	Maria Sødahl	Norway, Sweden
Kuessipan		Myriam Verreault	Canada
Lina from Lima	Lina de Lima	María Paz González	Chile, Argentina, Peru
The Lost Okoroshi		Abba Makama	Nigeria
Love Me Tender		Klaudia Reynicke	Switzerland
Murmur		Heather Young	Canada
My Life as a Comedian	En komikers uppväxt	Rojda Sekersöz	Sweden, Belgium
Noura's Dream		Hinde Boujemaa	Tunisia, Belgium, France, Qatar
The Obituary of Tunde Johnson		Ali LeRoi	United States
Pompei		Anna Falguères and John Shank	Belgium, Canada, France
Raf		Harry Cepka	Canada
The Rest of Us		Aisling Chin-Yee	Canada
Sea Fever		Neasa Hardiman	Ireland, Sweden, Belgium, United Kingdom
Simple Women		Chiara Malta	Italy, Romania
Sole		Carlo Sironi	Italy, Poland
Son-Mother	Pesar-Madar	Mahnaz Mohammadi	Iran, Czech Republic
Stories from the Chestnut Woods	Zgodbe iz kostanjevih gozdov	Gregor Božič	Slovenia, Italy
Sweetness in the Belly		Zeresenay Berhane Mehari	Canada, Ireland
Two of Us	Deux	Filippo Meneghetti	France, Luxembourg, Belgium
Zana		Antoneta Kastrati	Kosovo, Albania

=== Short Cuts ===
English title	Original title	Director(s)	Production country
All Cats Are Grey in the Dark	Nachts sind alle Katzen grau	Lasse Linder	Switzerland
All Inclusive		Teemu Nikki	Finland
And Then the Bear	L'Heure de l'ours	Agnès Patron	France
Ani		Josephine Stewart-Te Whiu	New Zealand
Anna		Dekel Berenson	Ukraine, Israel, United Kingdom
Are You Hungry?	Onko sulla nälkä?	Teemu Niukkanen	Finland
Austral Fever	Fiebre Austral	Thomas Woodroffe	Chile
BARAKAT		Manon Nammour	Lebanon
Bare Trees in the Mist		Rajan Kathet	Nepal
Butterflies	Parparim	Yona Rozenkier	Israel, France
Daddio		Casey Wilson	United States
Darling		Saim Sadiq	Pakistan
Daughter	Dcera	Daria Kashcheeva	Czech Republic
Delphine		Chloé Robichaud	Canada
The Depths	Les Profondeurs	Ariane Louis-Seize	Canada
Exam	Emtehan	Sonia K. Hadad	Iran
Flesh	Carne	Camila Kater	Brazil, Spain
Flood		Joseph Amenta	Canada
A Fool God		Hiwot Admasu Getaneh	France
God's Nightmares		Daniel Cockburn	Canada
Hello Ahma	gui	Siyou Tan	Singapore
Highway to Heaven		Sandra Ignagni	Canada
Hot Flash		Thea Hollatz	Canada
Human Nature		Sverre Fredriksen	Netherlands
I Am in the World as Free and Slender as a Deer on a Plain		Sofia Banzhaf	Canada
I'll End Up in Jail	Je finirai en prison	Alexandre Dostie	Canada
It's Nothing		Anna Maguire	Canada, United Kingdom
Jarvik		Émilie Mannering	Canada
Life Support		Renuka Jeyapalan	Canada
Locals Only		Brent Harris	South Africa
Lucia en el limbo		Valentina Maurel	Belgium, France, Costa Rica
Measure		Karen Chapman	Canada
The Nap	La Siesta	Federico Luis Tachella	Argentina
Nimic		Yorgos Lanthimos	Germany, United Kingdom, United States
No Crying at the Dinner Table		Carol Nguyen	Canada
Now Is the Time		Christopher Auchter	Canada
Oracle		Aaron Poole	Canada
The Physics of Sorrow	Physique de la tristesse	Theodore Ushev	Canada
Please Speak Continuously and Describe Your Experiences as They Come to You		Brandon Cronenberg	Canada
The Raft		Sylvain Cruiziat	Germany
Rebel		Pier-Philippe Chevigny	Canada
Reminiscences of the Green Revolution		Dean Colin Marcial	Philippines
Route-3		Thanasis Neofotistos	Greece, Bosnia and Herzegovina
Sadla		Zamo Mkhwanazi	South Africa
She Runs	Nan Fang Shao Nv	Qiu Yang	China, France
Something to Remember	Något att minnas	Niki Lindroth von Bahr	Sweden
Thirsty		Nicole Delaney	United States
This Ink Runs Deep		Asia Youngman	Canada
Toomas Beneath the Valley of the Wild Wolves	Toomas teispool metsikute huntide orgu	Chintis Lundgren	Croatia, Estonia, France
The Trap	Fakh	Nada Riyadh	Egypt, Germany
Volcano		Karen Moore	Canada
Watermelon Juice	Suc de síndria	Irene Moray	Spain
Who Talks	Ingen Lyssnar	Elin Övergaard	Sweden
Why Slugs Have No Legs		Aline Höchli	Switzerland
Yandere		William Laboury	France

=== Midnight Madness ===
English title	Original title	Director(s)	Production country
Blood Quantum		Jeff Barnaby	Canada
Color Out of Space		Richard Stanley	United States
Crazy World	Ani Mulalu	Isaac Nabwana	Uganda
First Love	初恋	Takashi Miike	Japan
Gundala		Joko Anwar	Indonesia
The Platform	El Hoyo	Galder Gaztelu-Urrutia	Spain
Saint Maud		Rose Glass	United Kingdom
The Twentieth Century		Matthew Rankin	Canada
The Vast of Night		Andrew Patterson	United States
The Vigil		Keith Thomas	United States

=== Platform ===
English title	Original title	Director(s)	Production country
Anne at 13,000 Ft.		Kazik Radwanski	Canada
Martin Eden		Pietro Marcello	Italy, France
The Moneychanger	Así habló el cambista	Federico Veiroj	Uruguay
My Zoe		Julie Delpy	United Kingdom, France, Germany
Proxima		Alice Winocour	France
Rocks		Sarah Gavron	United Kingdom
The Sleepwalkers	Los sonámbulos	Paula Hernández	Argentina
Sound of Metal		Darius Marder	United States
Wet Season	热带雨	Anthony Chen	Singapore
Workforce	Mano de obra	David Zonana	Mexico

=== Primetime ===
English title	Original title	Director(s)	Production country
Black Bitch		Rachel Perkins	Australia
Briarpatch		Andy Greenwald	United States
Limetown		Zack Akers and Skip Bronkie	United States
Mrs. Fletcher		Tom Perrotta	United States
Savages	Les Sauvages	Rebecca Zlotowski	France
The Sleepers	Bez vedomí	Ivan Zachariáš and Ondřej Gabriel	Czech Republic

=== Cinemathèque ===
English title	Original title	Director(s)	Production country
A Dry White Season		Euzhan Palcy	United States, France
The Last of Sheila		Herbert Ross	United States
The Last Waltz		Martin Scorsese	United States
Pickpocket		Robert Bresson	France
No		Pablo Larraín	Chile, France, United States

=== Wavelengths ===
English title	Original title	Director(s)	Production country
143 Sahara Street		Hassen Ferhani	Algeria
2minutes40seconds		Han Ok-hee	
2008		Blake Williams	Canada
Amusement Ride		Tomonari Nishikawa	
Austrian Pavilion		Philipp Fleischmann	
Billy		Zachary Epcar	
The Bite		Pedro Nemes Marques	
Black Sun		Maureen Fazendeiro	
Book of Hours		Annie MacDonell	Canada
Circumplector		Gaston Solnicki	
Cézanne		Luke Fowler	
Endless Night	Longa noite	Eloy Enciso	Spain
The Fever	A Febre	Maya Da-Rin	Brazil, France, Germany
Un Film Dramatique		Éric Baudelaire	France
Fire Will Come		Oliver Laxe	Spain, France, Luxembourg
Heavy Metal Detox		Josef Dabernig	
Heimat is a Space in Time	Heimat ist ein Raum aus Zeit	Thomas Heise	Germany, Austria
Hrvoji, Look at You from the Tower		Ryan Ferko	Canada
Krabi, 2562		Anocha Suwichakornpong and Ben Rivers	Thailand, United Kingdom
Liberté		Albert Serra	France, Germany, Portugal, Spain
My Skin, Luminous		Gabino Rodríguez and Nicolás Pereda	Canada, Mexico
Remembrance: A Portrait Study		Edward Owens	
SaF05		Charlotte Prodger	
Second Generation		Miryam Charles	Canada
Seven Years in May		Affonso Uchôa	Brazil
Slow Volumes		Mike Gibisser	
State Funeral	Государственные похороны	Sergei Loznitsa	Netherlands, Lithuania
Sun Rave		Roy Samaha	
This Action Lies		James N. Kienitz Wilkins	
Those That, At a Distance, Resemble Another		Jessica Sarah Rinland	
A Topography of Memory		Burak Çevik	Turkey, Canada
Transcript		Erica Sheu	
(tourism studies)		Joshua Gen Solondz	
Vever (for Barbara)		Deborah Stratman	
Vitalina Varela		Pedro Costa	Portugal
We Still Have to Close Our Eyes		John Torres	
Who's Afraid of Ideology? Part 2		Marwa Arsanios	

== Canada's Top Ten ==
TIFF's annual Canada's Top Ten list, its national critics and festival programmers poll of the ten best feature and short films of the year, was released on 11 December 2019.

=== Feature films ===
- And the Birds Rained Down (Il pleuvait des oiseaux) – Louise Archambault
- Anne at 13,000 Ft. – Kazik Radwanski
- Antigone – Sophie Deraspe
- Black Conflux – Nicole Dorsey
- The Body Remembers When the World Broke Open – Elle-Máijá Tailfeathers and Kathleen Hepburn
- Matthias & Maxime – Xavier Dolan
- Murmur – Heather Young
- One Day in the Life of Noah Piugattuk – Zacharias Kunuk
- The Twentieth Century – Matthew Rankin
- White Lie – Calvin Thomas and Yonah Lewis

=== Short films ===
- Acadiana – Guillaume Fournier, Samuel Matteau and Yannick Nolin
- Cityscape – Michael Snow
- Delphine – Chloé Robichaud
- Docking – Trevor Anderson
- I Am in the World as Free and Slender as a Deer on a Plain – Sofia Banzhaf
- Jarvik – Émilie Mannering
- No Crying at the Dinner Table – Carol Nguyen
- The Physics of Sorrow – Theodore Ushev
- Please Speak Continuously and Describe Your Experiences as They Come to You – Brandon Cronenberg
- Throat Singing in Kangirsuk (Katatjatuuk Kangirsumi) – Eva Kaukai and Manon Chamberland
