= 2019 Vancouver International Film Festival =

Vancouver International Film Festival
- Opening film: Guest of Honour by Atom Egoyan
- Closing film: La Belle Époque by Nicolas Bedos
- Location: Vancouver, British Columbia, Canada
- Festival date: September 26 - October 11, 2019

The 38th Vancouver International Film Festival (VIFF) took place from September 26 to October 11, 2019. The opening film was Atom Egoyan's Guest of Honour, and the closing film was Nicolas Bedos's La Belle Époque.

== Awards ==
The festival award winners were announced on October 15.

Award	Film	Director
People's Choice	Parasite	Bong Joon-ho
Most Popular Canadian Feature	Red Snow	Marie Clements
Most Popular Canadian Documentary	Haida Modern	Charles Wilkinson
Most Popular International Documentary	Coup 53	Taghi Amirani
Best Canadian Film	One Day in the Life of Noah Piugattuk	Zacharias Kunuk
Best Canadian Film, Honorable Mention	Blood Quantum	Jeff Barnaby
Best Canadian Documentary	Jordan River Anderson, the Messenger	Alanis Obomsawin
Best Canadian Documentary, Honorable Mention	My Dads, My Moms and Me	Julia Ivanova
Best Canadian Short Film	At the Bottom of the Sea	Caroline So Jung Lee
Best Canadian Short Film, Honorable Mention	The Physics of Sorrow	Theodore Ushev
Emerging Canadian Director	Murmur	Heather Young
Emerging Canadian Director, Honorable Mention	Kuessipan	Myriam Verreault
Most Promising Canadian Director of a Short Film	Acadiana	Guillaume Fournier, Samuel Matteau, Yannick Nolin
Most Promising Canadian Director of a Short Film, Honorable Mention	Labour/Leisure	Jessica Johnson, Ryan Ermacora
Best BC Film	The Body Remembers When the World Broke Open	Elle-Máijá Tailfeathers, Kathleen Hepburn
Sea to Sky Award	The World Is Bright	Ying Wang
BC Emerging Filmmaker	The Body Remembers When the World Broke Open	Elle-Máijá Tailfeathers
VIFF Impact Award	Resistance Fighters	Michael Wech
Rob Stewart Eco Warrior Award	The Pollinators	Peter Nelson

== Films ==
=== Galas ===
- Guest of Honour — Atom Egoyan (Opening)
- La Belle Époque — Nicolas Bedos (Closing)

=== Special Presentations ===
- Ford v Ferrari — James Mangold
- Harriet — Kasi Lemmons
- A Hidden Life — Terrence Malick
- Jojo Rabbit — Taika Waititi
- Just Mercy — Destin Daniel Cretton
- The Laundromat — Steven Soderbergh
- The Lighthouse — Robert Eggers
- Marriage Story — Noah Baumbach
- Motherless Brooklyn — Edward Norton
- Mr. Jones — Agnieszka Holland
- No.7 Cherry Lane — Yonfan
- Pain and Glory — Pedro Almodóvar
- The Painted Bird — Václav Marhoul
- Parasite — Bong Joon-ho
- Portrait of a Lady on Fire — Céline Sciamma
- The Song of Names — François Girard
- Sorry We Missed You — Ken Loach
- The Two Popes — Fernando Meirelles
- Young Ahmed — Jean-Pierre and Luc Dardenne

=== Contemporary World Cinema ===
- Adam — Maryam Touzani
- And Then We Danced — Levan Akin
- Babysplitters — Sam Friedlander
- Bacurau — Kleber Mendonça Filho
- Beanpole — Kantemir Balagov
- Burning Cane — Phillip Youmans
- Castle of Dreams — Reza Mirkarimi
- Chained — Yaron Shani
- Checkered Ninja — Anders Matthesen
- Cherry Blossoms and Demons — Doris Dörrie
- The Day After I'm Gone — Nimrod Eldar
- Divine Love — Gabriel Mascaro
- A Dog and His Man — Siddharth Tripathy
- Dogs Don't Wear Pants — J-P Valkeapää
- Fourteen — Dan Sallitt
- Frankie — Ira Sachs
- I Was at Home, But — Angela Schanelec
- The Invisible Life of Eurídice Gusmão — Karim Aïnouz
- It Must Be Heaven — Elia Suleiman
- Joel — Carlos Sorín
- Koko-di Koko-da — Johannes Nyholm
- Lara — Jan-Ole Gerster
- The Last to See Them — Sara Summa
- Little Joe — Jessica Hausner
- Noah Land — Cenk Ertürk
- Once in Trubchevsk — Larisa Sadilova
- Out of Tune — Frederikke Aspöck
- Port Authority — Danielle Lessovitz
- Queen of Hearts — May el-Toukhy
- The Realm — Rodrigo Sorogoyen
- Retrospekt — Esther Rots
- Scarborough — Barnaby Southcombe
- Sometimes Always Never — Carl Hunter
- Song Without a Name — Melina León
- Spider — Andrés Wood
- Staff Only — Neus Ballús
- Stitches — Miroslav Terzić
- Synonyms — Nadav Lapid
- Tehran: City of Love — Ali Jaberansari
- Temblores — Jayro Bustamante
- Those Who Remained — Barnabás Tóth
- Vai — Nicole Whippy, Becs Arahanga, Amberley Jo Aumua, Matasila Freshwater, Dianna Fuemana, Mīria George, 'Ofa-ki Guttenbeil-Likiliki, Marina Alofagia McCartney
- A Voluntary Year — Ulrich Köhler, Henner Winkler
- The Whistlers — Corneliu Porumboiu
- A White, White Day (Hvítur, Hvítur Dagur) — Hlynur Pálmason
- Yuli — Icíar Bollaín

=== Spotlight on France ===
- Amanda — Mikhaël Hers
- By the Grace of God — François Ozon
- Deerskin — Quentin Dupieux
- I Lost My Body — Jérémy Clapin
- Joan of Arc — Bruno Dumont
- Les Misérables — Ladj Ly
- Oh Mercy! — Arnaud Desplechin
- The Specials — Éric Toledano and Olivier Nakache
- Who You Think I Am — Safy Nebbou

=== Focus on Italy ===
- Amare amaro — Julien Paolini
- Dafne — Federico Bondi
- The Disappearance of My Mother — Beniamino Barrese
- Dolce Fine Giornata — Jacek Borcuch
- Marghe and Her Mother — Mohsen Makhmalbaf
- Santiago, Italia — Nanni Moretti
- Sole — Carlo Sironi

=== Vanguard ===
- Bait — Mark Jenkin
- Belonging — Burak Çevik
- I, Wretched Man — Bastian Wilplinger
- Miel-Emile — Peter van Houten
- My Window — Rodrigo John
- Off Season — Henning Beckhoff
- One Man Dies a Million Times — Jessica Oreck
- Ridge — John Skoog
- Subject to Review — Theo Anthony
- Vitalina Varela — Pedro Costa

=== Sea to Sky ===
- Ash — Andrew Huculiak
- The Body Remembers When the World Broke Open — Elle-Máijá Tailfeathers, Kathleen Hepburn
- Daughter — Anthony Shim
- Haida Modern — Charles Wilkinson
- My Dads, My Moms and Me — Julia Ivanova
- Raf — Harry Cepka
- Red Snow — Marie Clements
- Water Over Glass — Kellen Jackson, Zoe Kirk-Gushawaty, Amanda Thomson, Jimi Pantalon
- The World Is Bright — Ying Wang

=== True North ===
- The Acrobat (L'Acrobate) — Rodrigue Jean
- American Woman — Semi Chellas
- And the Birds Rained Down (Il pleuvait des oiseaux) — Louise Archambault
- Assholes: A Theory — John Walker
- A Brother's Love (La femme de mon frère) — Monia Chokri
- Castle in the Ground — Joey Klein
- Clifton Hill — Albert Shin
- Conviction — Ariella Pahlke, Teresa MacInnes, Nance Ackerman
- Cranks — Ryan McKenna
- Easy Land — Sanja Živković
- Jordan River Anderson, the Messenger — Alanis Obomsawin
- Kuessipan — Myriam Verreault
- L.A. Tea Time — Sophie Bédard Marcotte
- One Day in the Life of Noah Piugattuk — Zacharias Kunuk
- Rustic Oracle — Sonia Boileau
- Symphony in Aquamarine — Dan Popa
- Three Feathers — Carla Ulrich
- To Live to Sing — Johnny Ma
- When We Walk — Jason DaSilva
- White Lie — Yonah Lewis, Calvin Thomas

=== Future//Present ===
- Anne at 13,000 Ft. — Kazik Radwanski
- Danny — Aaron Zeghers, Lewis Bennett
- Killer Queen — Ramin Fahrenheit
- MS Slavic 7 — Sofia Bohdanowicz
- Murmur — Heather Young
- Tapeworm — Fabián Velasco, Miloš Mitrovič
- Tito — Grace Glowicki
- The Twentieth Century — Matthew Rankin

=== Impact ===
- 63 Up — Michael Apted
- Buddha in Africa — Nicole Schafer
- Coup 53 — Taghi Amirani
- The Euphoria of Being — Reka Szabo
- Gateways to New York — Martin Witz
- The Great Green Wall — Jared P. Scott
- Human Nature — Adam Bolt
- The Men's Room — Petter Sommer, Jo Vemund Svendsen
- Midnight Family — Luke Lorentzen
- My Father and Me — Nick Broomfield
- The Pollinators — Peter Nelson
- The Rabbi Goes West — Amy Geller, Gerald Peary
- Reason — Anand Patwardhan
- Resistance Fighters — Michael Wech
- Scheme Birds — Ellen Fiske, Ellinor Hallin
- Sea of Shadows — Richard Ladkani
- A Seat at the Table — David Nash, Simon Mark-Brown
- Stieg Larsson: The Man Who Played With Fire — Henrik Georgsson
- Talking About Trees — Suhaib Gasmelbari
- Trust Machine: The Story of Blockchain — Alex Winter
- We Are Not Princesses — Bridgette Auger, Itab Azzam
- The Whale and the Raven — Miriam Leuze
- Wildland — Alex Jablonski, Kahlil Hudson

=== Gateway ===
- Another Child — Kim Yoon-seok
- Balloon — Pema Tseden
- Birthday — Lee Jong-un
- Boluomi — Lau Kek-Huat, Vera Chen
- The Cave — Tom Waller
- Children of the Sea — Ayumu Watanabe
- Dwelling in the Fuchun Mountains — Gu Xiaogang
- Every Day a Good Day — Tatsushi Ōmori
- Hard-Core — Nobuhiro Yamashita
- Krabi, 2562 — Ben Rivers, Anocha Suwichakornpong
- Lost Course — Jill Li
- Lunana: A Yak in the Classroom — Pawo Choyning Dorji
- Melancholic — Seiji Tanaka
- No Longer Human — Mika Ninagawa
- Present. Perfect. — Shengze Zhu
- Samsara — Moon Jeong-yun
- The Shadow Play — Lou Ye
- Spring Tide — Yang Lina
- Still Human — Oliver Siu Kuen Chan
- Vanishing Days — Zhu Xin
- Wet Season — Anthony Chen
- White Snake — Amp Wong, Zhao Ji
- The Wild Goose Lake — Diao Yinan
- Wild Sparrow — Shih Li

=== M/A/D ===
- Architecture of Infinity — Christoph Schaub
- Beyond the Visible: Hilma af Klint — Halyna Dyrschka
- Cunningham — Alla Kovgan
- Devil's Pie: D'Angelo — Carine Bulsma
- Edo Avant-Garde — Linda Hoaglund
- Eliades Ochoa: From Cuba to the World — Cynthia Biestek
- Escher: Journey Into Infinity — Robin Lutz
- It Was All So Wonderful: The Everyday Magic of Mary Pratt — Kenneth J. Harvey
- Leonardo: The Works — Phil Grabsky
- Martha: A Picture Story — Selina Miles
- Neutra: Survival Through Design — Pi Letofsky
- Nomad: In the Footsteps of Bruce Chatwin — Werner Herzog
- Other Music — Puloma Basu, Rob Hatch-Miller
- Our Time Machine — Yang Sun, S. Leo Chiang
- Stuffed — Erin Derham
- System K — Renaud Barret
- Ursula Von Rydingsvard: Into Her Own — Daniel Traub
- Varda by Agnès — Agnès Varda
- What She Said: The Art of Pauline Kael — Rob Garver
- Years of Construction — Heinz Emigholz

=== ALT ===
- Blood Quantum — Jeff Barnaby
- Boyz in the Wood — Ninian Doff
- Come to Daddy — Ant Timpson
- The Death of Dick Long — Daniel Scheinert
- Extra Ordinary — Mike Ahern, Enda Loughman
- Greener Grass — Jocelyn DeBoer, Dawn Luebbe
- In the Tall Grass — Vincenzo Natali
- Judy and Punch — Mirrah Foulkes
- Knives and Skin — Jennifer Reeder
- The Lodge — Veronika Franz and Severin Fiala
- Paradise Hills — Alice Waddington

=== Canadian Shorts ===
- At the Bottom of the Sea — Caroline So Jung Lee
- The Beach Raiders — Tyson Breuer
- Bumblebee — Adam Beck
- Canaan — Wang Weibin
- Chubby — Madeleine Sims-Fewer, Dusty Mancinelli
- The Cut (La Coupure) — Chloé Cinq-Mars
- Days of Rage — Eli Jean Tahchi
- Deady Freddy — Alicia Eisen
- Delphine — Chloé Robichaud
- Finding Uranus — Ivan Li
- Flood — Joseph Amenta
- Ghoulish Galactic Grievances — Josh Owen
- Grandma's House — Sophy Romvari
- Hand Job — Kara Hornland
- Heart Bomb (Une bombe au cœur) — Rémi St-Michel
- Highway to Heaven: A Mosaic in One Mile — Sandra Ignagni
- I Am in the World as Free and Slender as a Deer on a Plain — Sofia Banzhaf
- I'll End Up in Jail (Je finirai en prison) — Alexandre Dostie
- In Which Life Continues Without Time — Sheridan Tamayo-Henderson
- Jarvik — Émilie Mannering
- Labour/Leisure — Jessica Johnson, Ryan Ermacora
- Main Squeeze — Brendan Prost
- My Heart Is Walking Around Outside of My Body — Matthew Taylor Blais
- No Crying at the Dinner Table — Carol Nguyen
- Now Is the Time — Christopher Auchter
- The Physics of Sorrow — Theodore Ushev
- Pick — Alicia K. Harris
- Pinch — Diego Maclean
- Pools — Seth Fluker
- The Procession (Le Cortège) — Pascal Blanchet, Rodolphe Saint-Gelais
- Shadow Trap — Damian Gillis, Michael Bourquin
- Solastalgia — Millefiore Clarkes
- The Spirit Keepers of Makuta'ay — Yen-Chao Lin
- Standard of Care — James Rathbone
- This Ink Runs Deep — Asia Youngman
- Unkept — Michael P. Vidler
- Venusian — Cameron Mackenzie, Suzanne Friesen
- A Winter Morning — Manny Mahal

=== International Shorts ===
- Amparo's Offerings — Leonel Chee
- Call Connect — Indianna Bell, Josiah Allen
- A Disappearance — Laura Spini, Laurence Brook
- Disrepute — Stephane Mounkassa, Stefan Sundin
- Diversion — Mathieu Mégemont
- Family Hour — Maria Ponomarova
- First Disco — Helen O'Reilly
- Flush — Sheridan O'Donnell
- Forgiveness — Marcello Cotugno
- Grandpa — Clifford Miu
- I Signed the Petition — Mahdi Fleifel
- In the Shadow of the Guacari — Greg Mendez
- The Interview — Ivan Sosnin
- Itohime — Nao Izumi
- Kill the Boy — Juan Pablo Villavicencio Borges
- Lee Ann Womack's "Hollywood" — Chris Ullens
- The Legend — Manon Eyriey
- Liminaali & Communitas — Laura Rantanen
- Long-Legged Nuria — Frank Vera Jimenez
- Masmelos — Duvan Duque
- Mortis — Xindi Lou
- My Generation — Ludovic Houplain
- Nurtured — Ben Pearce
- O Holy Ghost — Mark Bradshaw
- Pearl — Yuchao Feng
- Romantica.com — Shay Fellner
- The Sea — Cameron Richards
- Song Sparrow — Farzaneh Omidvarnia
- Taboo — Olivia Altavilla
- Tangle — Malihe Ghloamzadeh
- Tender — Anthony Lucido
- Tolerance — Shaunoh
- Vaca — Marta Bayarri
- Way Back Home — Diego Freitas

=== Reel Youth ===
- 2:00 — Maxence Pupillo
- AMO — Hana Huang
- Better Off — Jules Brown
- Body Love — Grace Larey
- Bottle — Yegor Bondarenko
- Eyedentity — Yoo Jung Hong
- Falling Deeper — Ryan Chow
- Freedom of Breath — Yasin Farrokhi
- Frozen in Place — Sasha Argirov
- G.P.S. Girl Positioning System — Devin Johnson
- Home Sweet Home — Sarah Andrews
- Human Box — Tsai Chia-Jen
- Jericho — Sarah Andrews
- Marlene Heavyshields (Glowing in the Dark Woman) — Jubei Quesnelle, Jayna Creighton-Fox
- Qirqqut — Kadence Kikoak
- Sekani Dekelth — Jacoby Macdonald
- Super Grandma — Isabella Spadone
- To You — Amanda Blake, Maira Gimenes, Jin Lee, Emma Watson
- Tracks — Alicia Holownia, Caitlin Mungall, Jessica Lau, Joud Shawwa, Paige Ingram, Sophie McLean
- u really hurt me — Callahan Bracken
- Wamin (The Apple) — Katherine Nequado

=== Shorts screened with features ===
- Acadiana — Guillaume Fournier, Samuel Matteau and Yannick Nolin
- Elvis: Strung Out — Mark Oliver
- Forest on Fire — Reed Harkness
- Happytime Social Club — David Rodden Shortt
- Here and There (Aquí y allá) — Lina Rodriguez
- I'm Not Next — Tristin Greyeyes
- Lily — Adrienne Gruben
- Memoirs — Aaron Zeghers
- Names for Snow — Rebecca Thomassie
- Preface to a History — Devan Scott, Will Ross
- Question Period — Ann Marie Fleming
- Sofia — Nikolay Michaylov
- Throat Singing in Kangirsuk — Eva Kaukai, Manon Chamberland
- Turns — Mariano Sosa
- When the Children Left — Charlene Moore
- Wildfire — Bretten Hannam

=== Modes ===
- Amusement Ride — Tomonari Nishikawa
- Cavalcade — Johann Lurf
- L'Étoile de mer (The Starfish) — Maya Schweizer
- Hard On — Joanna Rytel
- Interbeing — Martina Hoogland Ivanow
- Kasiterit — Riar Rizaldi
- New Acid — Basim Magdy
- Stay Awake, Be Ready — Pham Thien An
- The Stroker - Pilvi Takala
- Swatted — Ismaël Joffroy Chandoutis
- Swinguerra — Barbara Wagner, Benjamin De Burca
- Umbra — Florian Fischer, Johannes Krell
