= The Curve (film series) =

Canadian short film series in 2020

The Curve is a Canadian short film series, released in 2020 by the National Film Board of Canada as a response to the COVID-19 pandemic.

Based around the concept of documenting a strange and unique period in history, the project commissioned various filmmakers to make short films which were distributed by the NFB on a dedicated streaming platform. The only rules were that the film had to be about life during the pandemic, and that the filmmakers had to follow whatever health guidelines and restrictions were in place where they lived; otherwise, they were given carte blanche to make their film in any format they wanted.

The most successful films in the project were Andrea Dorfman's How to Be At Home, which accrued over 55,000 views within just a few weeks of its debut and was named to the Toronto International Film Festival's year-end Canada's Top Ten list for short films, and Eli Jean Tahchi's Sometimes I Wish I Was on a Desert Island (Y’a des fois où j’aimerais me trouver sur une île déserte), which was a Prix Iris nominee for Best Short Documentary at the 24th Quebec Cinema Awards.

== Films ==
- 60 Day Cycle — Darcy Wittenburg, Colin Jones, Darren McCullough
- 2000MM — Georges Hannan
- Appleton Avenue — Bruno Moynié
- As Night Descends — Nadine Gomez
- Back to School — Olivia Coombs
- Cities — Lillian Chan
- Come to Your Senses — Alicia Eisen, Sophie Jarvis
- Contact: Requiem for a Word — Olivier Asselin
- COVID-19: The Future of Food — Jérémie Battaglia
- Economics — Philip Eddolls
- Governance — Ho Che Anderson
- Have You Eaten — Lina Li
- How to Be At Home — Andrea Dorfman
- I Am Gay — Ajahnis Charley
- In the Garden on the Farm — Kristin Catherwood
- Jia — Weiye Su
- Jules' Impossible Summer — Marie-Julie Dallaire
- June Night — Mike Maryniuk
- K'i Tah Amongst the Birch — Melaw Nakehk'o
- Love in Quarantine — Millefiore Clarkes
- Nbisiing — Cole Forrest
- Pandemic at the End of the World — Allan Code
- Road's End Chronicles — Nicolas Paquet
- Sol — Valérie Bah, Tatiana Zinga Botao
- Sometimes I Wish I Was on a Desert Island (Y’a des fois où j’aimerais me trouver sur une île déserte) — Eli Jean Tahchi
- Thursday — Galen Johnson
- Very Present — Conor McNally
- The Vigil — Christine Chevarie-Lessard
- Worldviews — Malcolm Sutherland
- Yesterday, Today, Tomorrow — Laura Cortes, Alexandra Hook, Mel Eshaghbeigi, Jam3

== See also ==
- Greetings from Isolation
