= Zug Island (film) =

- Directed by: Nicolas Lachapelle
- Written by: Nicolas Lachapelle; Tiago McNicoll Castro Lopes
- Produced by: Guillaume Collin; Nicolas Lachapelle
- Starring: Tiago McNicoll Castro Lopes
- Cinematography: Nicolas Lachapelle
- Edited by: Jérémie Carvalho
- Music by: Mourad Bennacer
- Production company: PRIM Centre d'artistes
- Distributed by: Les Films du 3 mars
- Release date: November 20, 2022 (RIDM)
- Running time: 22 minutes
- Country: Canada
- Languages: English; French

Zug Island is a Canadian short documentary film, directed by Nicolas Lachapelle and released in 2022. The film centres on an investigation by Tiago McNicoll Castro Lopes of the mysterious "Windsor Hum" that plagued residents of the Detroit-Windsor region for many years, and depicts the larger industrial devastation in and around the hum's presumed source on Zug Island.

The film premiered at the 2022 Montreal International Documentary Festival.

== Awards ==
Award	Date of ceremony	Category	Recipient(s)	Result	Ref(s)
DOXA Documentary Film Festival	2023	Short Documentary Award	Nicolas Lachapelle	Honored	
Prix Iris	December 10, 2023	Best Short Documentary	Nicolas Lachapelle, Guillaume Collin	Nominated	
Canadian Screen Awards	May 2024	Best Short Documentary	Nicolas Lachapelle	Nominated	
