= Belle River (film) =

2022 Canadian documentary film

- Directed by: Guillaume Fournier; Samuel Matteau; Yannick Nolin
- Written by: Guillaume Fournier; Samuel Matteau; Yannick Nolin
- Produced by: Guillaume Fournier; Samuel Matteau; Yannick Nolin
- Cinematography: Yannick Nolin
- Edited by: Guillaume Fournier; Samuel Matteau; Yannick Nolin
- Production company: Projet Kinomada
- Distributed by: SPIRA
- Release date: January 2022 (SNCF)
- Running time: 11 minutes
- Country: Canada
- Language: French

Belle River is a 2022 Canadian short documentary film directed by Guillaume Fournier, Samuel Matteau and Yannick Nolin. The third film in a trilogy about Cajun culture in Louisiana following the films Let the Good Times Roll (Laissez les bon temps rouler) in 2017 and Acadiana in 2019, the film profiles the residents of Pierre Part as they cope with the threat of their community being flooded by the possible but ultimately averted opening of the Morganza Spillway during the Mississippi River floods of 2019.

The film premiered at the 2022 Clermont-Ferrand International Short Film Festival. It had its North American premiere at SXSW, and was later screened at the Hot Docs Canadian International Documentary Festival and the DOXA Documentary Film Festival.

The film was named to the Toronto International Film Festival's annual year-end Canada's Top Ten list for 2022. It was a Prix Iris nominee for Best Short Documentary at the 25th Quebec Cinema Awards in 2023.
