= The Hum =

Low-frequency noise not audible to all people

The Hum is a persistent and invasive low-frequency humming, rumbling, or droning noise audible to many, but not all, people in an area. Hums have been reported in many countries, including Australia, Canada, the United Kingdom, and the United States. They are sometimes named according to the locality where the problem has been particularly publicized, such as the "Taos Hum" in New Mexico and the "Windsor Hum" in Ontario.

The Hum does not appear to be a single phenomenon. Different causes have been attributed, including local mechanical sources, often from industrial plants, as well as manifestations of tinnitus or other biological auditory effects.

== Description ==
A 1973 report cites a university study of fifty cases of people complaining about a "low throbbing background noise" that others were unable to hear. The sound, always peaking between 30 and 40 Hz (hertz), was found to only be heard during cool weather with a light breeze, and often early in the morning. These noises were often confined to a 10-kilometre (6 mi) wide area. For some who are capable of hearing it, The Hum can be a disturbing phenomenon, which has been linked to at least three suicides in the United Kingdom.

=== The Taos Hum ===
A study into the Taos Hum in the early 1990s in Taos, New Mexico indicated that at least two percent could hear it, each hearer at a different frequency between 32 and 80 Hz, modulated from 0.5 to 2 Hz. Similar results have been found in an earlier British study. It seems possible for hearers to move away from it, with one hearer of the Taos Hum reporting its range was 30 miles (48 km). There are approximately equal percentages of male and female hearers. Age does appear to be a factor, with middle-aged people more likely to hear it.

=== Auckland Hum ===
In 2006, Tom Moir, then of Massey University in Auckland, New Zealand, made several recordings that appeared to be the Auckland Hum. His previous research using simulated sounds had indicated that the hum was around 56 hertz.

=== Windsor Hum ===
In late 2011, residents of Windsor, Ontario, began reporting a low droning vibration, sometimes loud enough to be irritating (one evening in 2012 saw 22,000 reports to officials). It was estimated that the sound was emanating from Zug Island, a heavily industrialized section of River Rouge on the north bank of the Detroit River (which separates Windsor and Detroit). Canadian officials requested US assistance in determining the source, but local authorities were stymied by official refusals to allow access to the island. A steel mill operated by U.S. Steel was the possible cause, but officials stated that no new equipment had been installed or activated around the time that the noise became noticeable. When the blast furnaces were deactivated in April 2020, the noise went away as well.

=== Other ===
In 2021, hums were reported in Frankfurt and Darmstadt, in Germany. A year later, multiple sources for the hum were identified in Darmstadt: two faulty air conditioner units, a faulty heat pump, and three structural noise protection measures on energy generation plants.

In 2022, hums were reported in St. Louis County, Missouri and surrounding areas.

In 2023, a hum was reported in Omagh in Northern Ireland.

In November 2025, citizens of Whitehorse, Yukon, Canada reported a low mechanical humming which one resident described as "repetitive and random". Yukon Energy, who were using diesel generators due to lower than usual hydropower during that season, issued a statement saying that it was "unlikely" that the sound of their generators could reach distant neighborhoods.

== Possible explanations ==
=== High-pressure gas pipelines ===
Industrial-facilities mechanical engineer Steve Kohlhase spent $30,000 on legal fees and equipment related to his independent investigation of the low-frequency hum. Garret Harkawiks' 2019 documentary film Doom Vibrations focused on Kohlhase's ten year journey to figure out what was causing the noise, and his theory behind it. In all reported cases Kohlhase studied, he said that the locations were along high-pressure gas pipelines, or at least in close proximity to them.

=== Background sounds ===
In 2009, the head of audiology at Addenbrooke's Hospital in Cambridge, David Baguley, said he believed people's problems with the hum were based on the physical world about one-third of the time, and stemmed from people focusing too keenly on innocuous background sounds the other two-thirds of the time. Baguley said for example the noise can be attributed to environmental causes, such as industrial machinery at a nearby factory or an industrial fan. But he also found that the majority of cases remain unexplained. Baguley said, "I think most people view the hum as a fringe belief because it's so subjective — people say they hear something that most people can't hear. But when you look at the vast number of people who say they hear it, it's obvious that there's something going on." Baguley also theorizes that people's hearing has become overly sensitive.

=== Mechanical devices ===
Although some form of mechanical source is an obvious candidate, given the common description of the hum as sounding like a diesel engine, the majority of reported hums have not been traced to a specific mechanical source.

In the case of Kokomo, Indiana, a city with heavy industry, the origin of the hum was thought to have been traced to two sources. The first was a 36 Hz tone from a cooling tower at the local DaimlerChrysler casting plant and the second was a 10 Hz tone from an air compressor intake at the Haynes International plant. After those devices were corrected, however, reports of the hum persisted.

Three hums have been linked to mechanical sources. The West Seattle Hum was traced to a vacuum pump used by CalPortland to offload cargo from ships. After CalPortland replaced the silencers on the machine, reports of the hum ceased. Likewise, the Wellington Hum is thought to have been due to the diesel generator on a visiting ship. A 35 Hz hum in Windsor, Ontario, is thought to have originated from a steelworks on the industrial zone of Zug Island near Detroit, with reports of the noise ceasing after the U.S. Steel plant there ceased operations in April 2020.

One hum in Myrtle Beach, South Carolina, was suspected of originating at a Santee Cooper substation almost two miles away from the home of a couple who first reported it. The substation is home to the state's largest transformer. One local couple sued the power company for the disruption the hum was causing them. The hum was louder inside their house than out, in part, they believed, because their house vibrated in resonance to the 60 Hz hum. In the lawsuit they claimed that the volume of the hum was measured at up to 64.1 dB in the couple's home.

Some researchers speculate that the very low frequency radio waves or extremely low frequency radio waves of the military TACAMO system, used by aircraft to communicate with submarines, might be the source for the hum. David Deming observes that the difficulty of locating a source of the hum could be attributed to its broadcast from moving aircraft in this fashion, although he notes that there have never been any reports of the Hum around the U.S. Navy's stationary broadcast stations at Cutler, Maine, and Jim Creek, Washington.

Deming considers it significant that the Hum "avoids publicity", often subsiding in response to an increase in local press coverage, and speculates that this may be a sign that the source is anthropogenic in nature.

=== Tinnitus ===
A suggested diagnosis of tinnitus, a self-reported disturbance of the auditory system, is used by some physicians in response to complaints about the Hum. Tinnitus is generated internally by the auditory and nervous systems, with no external stimulus.

While the Hum is hypothesized by some to be a form of low-frequency tinnitus, such as the venous hum, some report it not to be internal, being worse inside their homes than outside. However, others insist that it is equally bad indoors and outdoors. Some people notice the Hum only at home, while others hear it everywhere they go. Some sufferers report that it is made worse by soundproofing (e.g., double glazing), which serves only to decrease other environmental noise, thus making the Hum more apparent.

A study of 28 individuals with the condition by German and Norwegian researchers, reports that few can actually hear well in the range that the hum is supposedly in, indicating it may be low-frequency tinnitus.

=== Spontaneous otoacoustic emissions ===
Human ears generate their own noises, called spontaneous otoacoustic emissions (SOAE). Various studies have shown that 38 to 60 percent of adults with normal hearing have them, although the majority are unaware of these sounds. The people who do hear these sounds typically hear a faint hissing (cicada-like sound), buzzing or ringing, especially if they are otherwise in complete silence. Hence, researchers who looked at the Taos Hum considered otoacoustic emissions as a possibility.

=== Jet stream ===
Philip Dickinson suggested at an Institute of Biology conference in 1973 that the 30- to 40-Hz hum could be a result of the jet stream shearing against slower-moving air and possibly being amplified by power line posts, some of which were shown to vibrate, or by rooms which had a corresponding resonant frequency. Geoff Leventhall of the Chelsea College Acoustics Group dismissed this suggestion as "absolute nonsense".

=== Animals ===
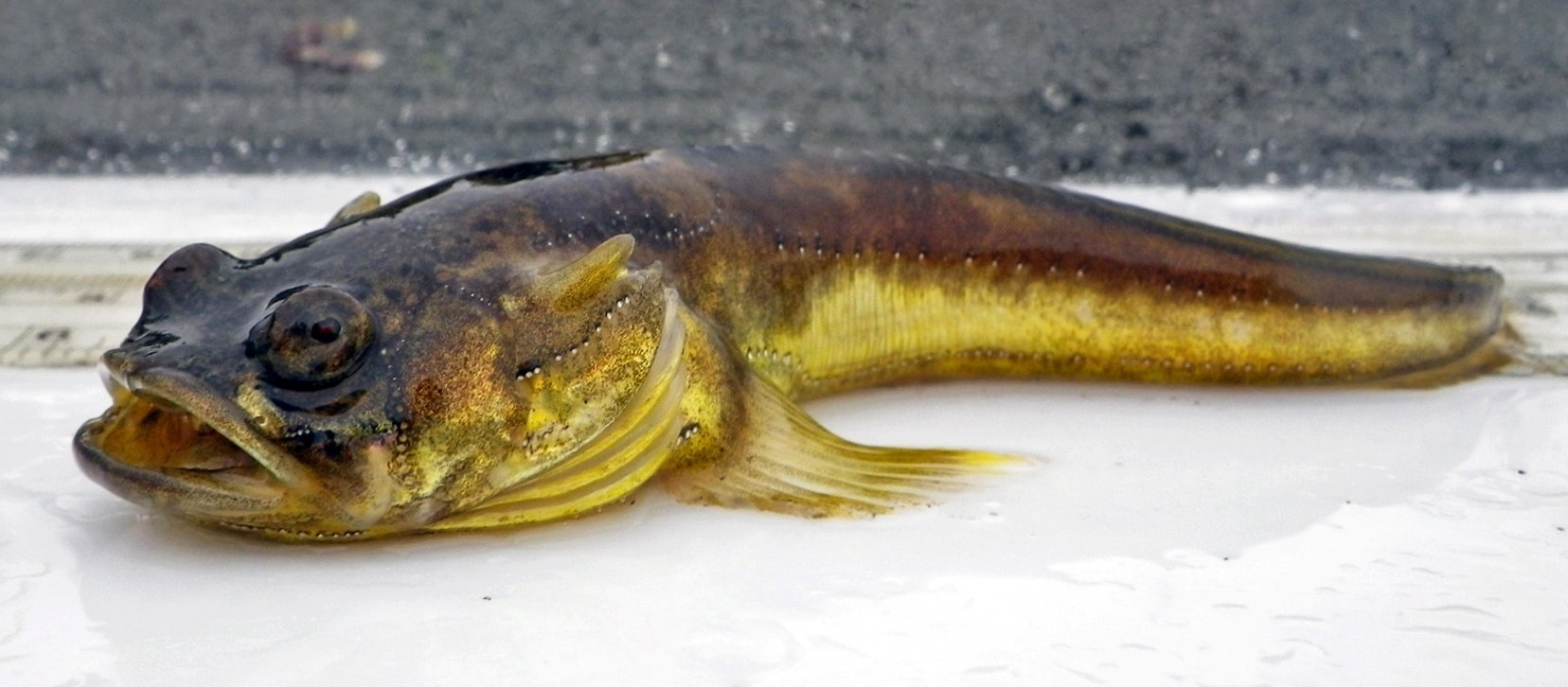
The midshipman fish was considered as a possible cause of the West Seattle Hum.

One of the many possible causes of the West Seattle Hum considered was that it was related to the midshipman fish, also known as the toadfish. A hum previously reported in Sausalito, California, was traced to the mating call of male midshipman fish. However, in that case the hum was resonating through houseboat hulls and affecting the people living on those boats. In the West Seattle case, the University of Washington researcher determined that it would be impossible for any resonating hum, transmitted via tanker or boat hulls, to be transmitted very far inland, certainly not far enough to account for the reports.

The Scottish Association for Marine Science hypothesised that the nocturnal humming sound heard in Hythe, Hampshire, could be produced by a similar "sonic" fish. The council believed this to be unlikely, since such fish are not commonly found in inshore waters of the UK. As of February 2014, although the source had still not been located, the Hythe hum had been recorded.

== Treatment ==
At an acoustics laboratory at the University of Salford, David Baguley's research focused on using psychology and relaxation techniques to minimise distress due to the hum, which can lead to a quieting or even removal of the noise.

Geoff Leventhall, a noise and vibration expert, has suggested cognitive behavioral therapy (CBT) may be effective in helping those affected: "It's a question of whether you tense up to the noise or are relaxed about it. The CBT was shown to work, by helping people to take a different attitude to it."

== In popular culture ==
The Taos Hum has been featured on the TV show Unsolved Mysteries, and in LiveScience's "Top Ten Unexplained Phenomena", where it took tenth place. BBC Radio 4 featured an investigation of the Hum phenomena in their Punt PI fact-based comedy programme. In October 2022, the Norwegian state broadcaster NRK covered the Hum in its Oppdatert podcast.

In a 1998 episode of The X-Files titled "Drive", Agent Mulder speculates that extremely low frequency (ELF) radio waves "may be behind the so-called Taos Hum".

In a 2018 episode (Season 13 episode 21) of the police procedural series Criminal Minds, the main antagonist of the episode was made to commit violent acts as a result of mania caused by the Taos Hum. The story editors described the episode as having "an X-Files feel".

Jordan Tannahill's 2021 novel The Listeners tells the story of a group of people tormented by a continuous humming noise that seemingly only they can hear. It was the inspiration for an opera of the same name that debuted in 2022. The book was adapted into a BBC series of the same name by the BBC in 2024.

In a 2022 episode of the animated series American Dad! titled "Echoes", Avery Bullock (voiced by Patrick Stewart) muses about a mysterious background hum that several characters report hearing through the episode.

The Windsor Hum is the subject of the song "The Hum" by Canadian musician Dan Griffin, and the short documentary film Zug Island by Nicolas Lachapelle.

The Windsor Hum is also the subject of a song by Detroit band Protomartyr and appears on their 2017 album Relatives in Descent.

The Hum is thematized in metalcore band Converge's 2026 album Hum of Hurt, imagined as a physical manifestation of human suffering. Vocalist and lyricist Jacob Bannon suggests, "What if the Hum is the culmination of all the pain in the world creating an audible hum across the universe? Something noticeable to others operating on a similar frequency."

In Stephen King's 2019 novel The Institute (and its MGM+ television series adaptation), a low-frequency humming is often heard in the eponymous facility where the kidnapped psychic children are held and experimented on.

== See also ==
- Exploding head syndrome
- Infrasound
- Mains hum, a low-frequency hum that is part of the normal functioning of electrical equipment
- List of unexplained sounds
- Skyquake
- Havana syndrome
- Auroral noise
- The Listeners (TV Series)
