= Dads (film) =

2019 American documentary film

- Official release poster
- Directed by: Bryce Dallas Howard
- Produced by: Ron Howard; Brian Grazer; Michael Rosenberg; Justin Wilkes; Walter Matteson; Bryce Dallas Howard
- Cinematography: André Lascaris
- Edited by: Andrew Morreale
- Music by: Sami Jano
- Production companies: Imagine Documentaries; Nine Muses Entertainment; Dove Men + Care; Unilever Entertainment
- Distributed by: Apple TV+
- Release dates: September 6, 2019 (TIFF); June 19, 2020 (United States)
- Running time: 81 minutes
- Country: United States
- Language: English

Dads is an American documentary film directed by Bryce Dallas Howard in her feature film directorial debut. The film follows a portrait of contemporary fatherhood. It features celebrity fathers including Ron Howard, Jimmy Fallon, Judd Apatow, Jimmy Kimmel, Will Smith, Hasan Minhaj, Ken Jeong and Kenan Thompson, and everyday men around the world.

It had its world premiere at the Toronto International Film Festival on September 6, 2019. It was released on June 19, 2020, by Apple TV+.

== Synopsis ==
A portrait of contemporary fatherhood, the film blends the reflections of Howard's own father, film director Ron Howard, other Hollywood celebrity fathers and everyday men from around the world on what being a father means to them.

== Cast ==
- Judd Apatow
- Jimmy Fallon
- Neil Patrick Harris
- Ron Howard
- Ken Jeong
- Jimmy Kimmel
- Hasan Minhaj
- Conan O'Brien
- Patton Oswalt
- Will Smith
- Kenan Thompson
- Rance Howard
- Reed Howard
- Glen Henry
- Robert Selby
- Thiago Queiroz
- Shuichi Sakuma
- Rob Scheer
- Reece Scheer

== Production ==
In October 2018, it was announced Bryce Dallas Howard would direct the film, with Imagine Entertainment producing.

== Release ==
The film premiered at the 2019 Toronto International Film Festival, where it was named second runner-up for the People's Choice Award for Documentaries. Prior to, Apple TV+ acquired distribution rights to the film. It was released on June 19, 2020.

== Critical response ==
The review aggregator Rotten Tomatoes reported that 94% of critics gave the film positive reviews based on 35 reviews, with an average rating of 7.1/10. The site's critics consensus reads, "As solidly dependable as the fathers it depicts, Dads pays affectionate—and affecting—tribute to some of the many ways parents can make a difference." At Metacritic, the film has a weighted average score of 59 out of 100 based on 5 critics, indicating "mixed or average" reviews.

Tomris Laffly of Variety wrote: "It’s mostly a vanilla documentary with no real destination, but one with plenty of cuteness to go around."
