= DOXA Short Documentary Award =

Annual Canadian film award

The DOXA Short Documentary Award is an annual Canadian film award, presented to honour the best short documentary film screened at that year's DOXA Documentary Film Festival. The award frequently, but not always, presents an honorable mention in addition to the overall winner.

Unlike feature documentaries, for which DOXA presents the separate Colin Low Award for Canadian documentaries and Feature Documentary Award for international documentaries, a single award is presented for short documentaries inclusive of both Canadian and international films.

== Winners ==
Year	Film	Filmmaker(s)	Ref
2013	18 kg	Kacper Czubak	
2014	Homo Ciris	Jana Mináriková	
2014	The Governance of Love	Adela Kaczmarek	
2015	Island and Flight	Dan Popa	
2015	I Thought I Told You to Shut Up!!	Charlie Tyrell	
2016	50 Feet from Syria	Skye Fitzgerald	
2016	La Laguna	Aaron Schock	
2017	Vers la tendresse	Alice Diop	
2017	Fixed!	Cat Mills	
2018	Crisanto Street	Paloma Martinez	
2018	Nuuca	Michelle Latimer	
2019	Time Is Out of Joint	Victory Arroyo	
2019	Haven	Colin Askey	
2020	Umbilical	Danski Tang	
2020	Huntsville Station	Jamie Meltzer, Chris Filippone	
2021	Ain't No Time for Women (Y'a pas d'heure pour les femmes)	Sarra El Abed	
2022	Galb’Echaouf	Abdessamad El Montassir	
2022	Spirit Emulsion	Siku Allooloo	
2023	Tiny	Ritchie Hemphill, Ryan Haché	
2023	Zug Island	Nicolas Lachapelle	
2024	Wouldn't Make It Any Other Way	Hao Zhou	
2024	A Short Film About a Chair	Ibrahim Handal	
2025	Correct Me If I'm Wrong	Hao Zhou	
2025	From Paris to Pyongyang	Helen Lee	
2026	Intersecting Memory	Shayma' Awawdeh	
2026	Tuktuit (Caribou)	Lindsay McIntyre	
