= Tapeworm (disambiguation) =

A tapeworm is a member of a class of parasitic worms.

Tapeworm may also refer to:

- Tapeworm infection, caused by the above worms
- Computer worms, originally called tapeworms
- Tapeworm (band), an American band, a defunct Nine Inch Nails side project
- Tapeworm (film), a 2019 Canadian feature film, directed by Milos Mitrovic and Fabian Velasco
- Tapeworm (game), a 2021 tabletop card game, designed by Edmund McMillen
- Tapeworm (comics), a DC Comics character
