= After the Silence =

2024 Canadian documentary film

- French: Après le silence
- Spanish: Después del silencio
- Directed by: Matilde-Luna Perotti
- Written by: Matilde-Luna Perotti
- Cinematography: Bleue Pronovost-Peyssier; Pauline Bouhelel
- Edited by: Matilde-Luna Perotti
- Music by: Kris Vango
- Production company: L'École des métiers du cinéma et de la vidéo
- Distributed by: Spira
- Release date: November 21, 2024 (RIDM)
- Running time: 14 minutes
- Country: Canada
- Language: Spanish

After the Silence (French: Après le silence, Spanish: Después del silencio) is a Canadian short documentary film, directed by Matilde-Luna Perotti and released in 2024. The film centres on her efforts to confront her family and break the silence about the sexual abuse she suffered at the hands of her uncle when she was growing up.

The film premiered in November 2024 at the Montreal International Documentary Festival.

== Awards ==
Award	Date of ceremony	Category	Recipient(s)	Result	Ref.
Dok Leipzig	2025	Golden Dove for Best Short Film	Matilde-Luna Perotti	Won	
Prix Iris	December 2025	Best Short Documentary	Matilde-Luna Perotti	Nominated	
