= Perfect (2016 film) =

2016 film by Jérémie Battaglia

- French: Parfaites
- Directed by: Jérémie Battaglia
- Written by: Jérémie Battaglia
- Produced by: Sylvie Van Brabant
- Cinematography: Jérémie Battaglia
- Edited by: Alexandre Lachance
- Music by: Vincent Letellier
- Production company: Production du Rapide Blanc
- Release date: July 29, 2016
- Running time: 77 minutes
- Country: Canada

Perfect (French: Parfaites) is a Canadian documentary film, directed by Jérémie Battaglia and released in 2016. The film profiles Canada's synchronized swimming team as the prepare for the 2016 Summer Olympics in Rio de Janeiro.

The film had selected theatrical screenings in July 2016 before being broadcast on television, both in French as an episode of the Ici Radio-Canada Télé documentary series 1001 vies and in English as an episode of the CBC Television documentary series Firsthand.

The film received two Prix Iris nominations at the 19th Quebec Cinema Awards in 2017, for Best Documentary Film and Best Cinematography in a Documentary (Battaglia).
