= 1915 (film) =

2015 film by Garin Hovannisian and Alec Mouhibian

- Theatrical release poster
- Directed by: Garin Hovannisian; Alec Mouhibian
- Written by: Garin Hovannisian; Alec Mouhibian
- Produced by: Garin Hovannisian; Alec Mouhibian; Terry Leonard
- Starring: Simon Abkarian; Angela Sarafyan; Nikolai Kinski; Debra Christofferson; Jim Piddock; Sam Page
- Cinematography: Leigh Lisbão Underwood
- Edited by: Paul Forte; Dan Dobi
- Music by: Serj Tankian
- Production companies: Bloodvine Media; Strongman
- Distributed by: Bloodvine Media
- Release date: April 17, 2015
- Running time: 82 minutes
- Country: United States
- Language: English
- Box office: $111,682

1915 is a 2015 American psychological thriller film written and directed by Garin Hovannisian and Alec Mouhibian. The film stars Simon Abkarian, Angela Sarafyan, Nikolai Kinski, Debra Christofferson, Jim Piddock, and Samuel Page. It follows a mysterious director staging a play to bring the ghosts of a forgotten tragedy back to life on the 100th anniversary of the Armenian genocide.

The film was released in theaters on April 17, 2015, and through video on demand on April 22, 2015.

== Plot ==
Exactly 100 years after the Armenian genocide committed within the Ottoman Empire, a director (Simon Abkarian) is staging a play at the historic Los Angeles Theatre to honor the victims of the massacre. The play stars his enigmatic wife (Angela Sarafyan) as an Armenian woman in 1915 who must make a tragic and controversial decision that will change the course of history. This will not be an ordinary performance. As protesters surround the theater before showtime, and a series of strange accidents spread panic among its actors (Sam Page, Nikolai Kinski) and producer (Jim Piddock), it appears that Simon's mission is far more dangerous than we think—and the ghosts of the past are everywhere.

== Cast ==
- Simon Abkarian as Simon
- Angela Sarafyan as Angela
- Samuel Page as James
- Jim Piddock as Jeffrey
- Nikolai Kinski as Tony
- Debra Christofferson as Lillian
- Sunny Suljic as Gabriel
- Courtney Halverson as Lucky
- Myles Cranford as Ray
- Linc Hand as Police Officer
- Mercy Malick as Radio Announcer
- Robert Hallak as Armenian Protest Leader
- David Imani as Turkish Protest Leader
- Lory Tatoulian as Armenian Protester

== Themes ==
The film explores many themes, especially that of denial—referring not only to the 100-year denial of the Armenian Genocide by the Republic of Turkey, but also the many forms of individual denial among the characters in the story.

Critic Martin Tsai, in his Los Angeles Times review, identified 1915 as contemplating "personal tragedy versus collective grief, artistic license versus historical responsibility, revisionist history versus corrective narrative, forgetting versus moving on," and praised the film as "one creative way to do justice to such a monumental topic."

In an interview, co-writer/director Alec Mouhibian said, "How can the past have such power over us in the present, and what are the secret ways in which we deal with it? The target of 1915 is you, the viewer, whoever you are, whatever your background. Everyone who steps into the mystery will experience it in one's own way. We hope you come out of it with a richer connection to your past -- a new way of feeling history."

== Production ==
1915 is the first feature film by Garin Hovannisian and Alec Mouhibian. Hovannisian is the author of Family of Shadows and has written for the Los Angeles Times, The New York Times, and other publications. Mouhibian is a writer and comedian whose work has appeared in Slate, The Weekly Standard, and a variety of other publications. He has also been a Media Fellow of the Hoover Institution at Stanford University.

Hovannisian and Mouhibian have been collaborating on film and literary projects for more than ten years.

The film was produced by Bloodvine Media, in conjunction with Strongman and mTuckman Media.

=== Location ===
Filming took place almost entirely on location at the historic Los Angeles Theatre, in downtown LA. Long believed to be haunted, the theater is its own character in the story, and the deleted scenes include references to one of its founders, Charlie Chaplin.

=== Music ===
The original score of the film was composed by System of a Down's lead singer, Serj Tankian. It is his first film score.

== Release ==
The theatrical release of 1915 in the United States took place on April 17, 2015, with the film's premiere taking place on April 13 at the Egyptian Theatre in conjunction with the American Cinematheque. It released widely in Russia on April 23, 2015, and in Armenia on April 25, 2015. Its first international preview was at the Maxim Gorky Theatre in Berlin, Germany on April 5, 2015. It released in Australia in June, 2015.

On May 26, 2016, the film was released in the UK. On June 4 it was released in France.

In 2015 it was featured selection in the Golden Apricot International Film Festival, Romanian International Film Festival, and Lake Van International Film Festival in Turkey, where it won the Special Jury Prize. It was also awarded "Best Film" by the World Entertainment Armenian Awards.

== Reception ==
On the review aggregator website Rotten Tomatoes, 40% of 10 critics' reviews are positive.

== See also ==
- 1915 in film
