= A French Youth =

2024 documentary film

- French: Une jeunesse française
- Directed by: Jérémie Battaglia
- Written by: Jérémie Battaglia
- Produced by: Amélie Lambert Bouchard; Elodie Pollet; Valérie Dupin; Cyrille Perez; Gilles Perez
- Cinematography: Jérémie Battaglia
- Edited by: Andrea Henriquez
- Music by: Armand Glowinski
- Production companies: 13 Prods; Les Films Extérieur Jour; Les Productions du Lagon
- Distributed by: Les Films du 3 mars
- Release date: May 1, 2024 (Hot Docs)
- Running time: 84 minutes
- Countries: Canada; France
- Language: French

A French Youth (French: Une jeunesse française) is a Canadian-French documentary film, directed by Jérémie Battaglia and released in 2024. The film profiles a small group of young immigrant men in the Provence region of France who have taken up the popular local sport of camargue.

The film premiered at the 2024 Hot Docs Canadian International Documentary Festival.

It was longlisted for the 2024 Jean-Marc Vallée DGC Discovery Award.
