= Garin Hovannisian =

Armenian writer and filmmaker (born 1986)

Garin K. Hovannisian
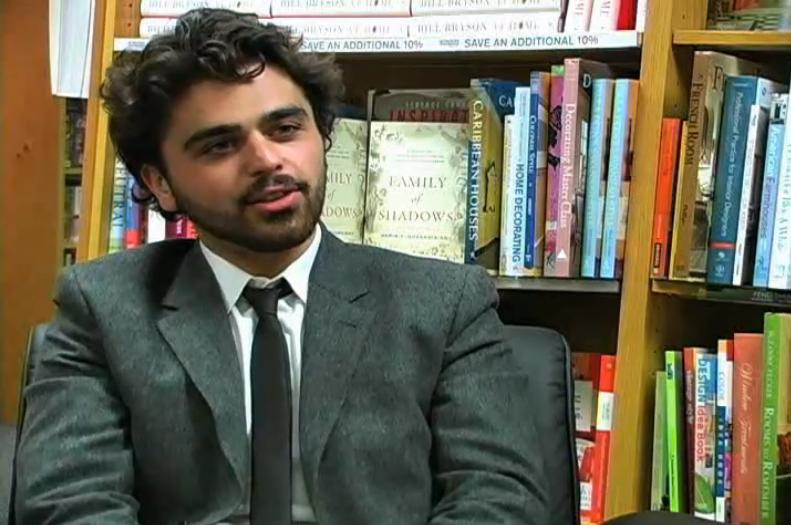
- Born: 1986 (age 39–40); Los Angeles, California
- Education: University of California, Los Angeles; Columbia University Graduate School of Journalism
- Occupations: Filmmaker; Founding Director, Creative Armenia
- Organization(s): Creative Armenia; Avalanche Entertainment
- Spouse: Larisa Hovannisian
- Parent(s): Raffi Hovannisian; Armine K. Hovannisian
- Awards: Fulbright Fellowship in Creative Writing; Lynton Award for Book Writing; Audience Award at AFI Fest; Audience Award at DOC NYC

Garin K. Hovannisian (born 1986) is an Armenian American writer, filmmaker, and producer. He is the director of the award-winning films 1915 (2015), I Am Not Alone (2019), and Truth to Power (2020), and the author of the book Family of Shadows: A century of murder, memory, and the Armenian American dream. He is also the founder of the arts foundation Creative Armenia.

== Early life and education ==
Born in Los Angeles, California, he is the son of politician Raffi K. Richard Hovannisian and founder of Orran benevolent non-governmental organization Armine K. Hovannisian. Garin Hovannisian is a graduate of the University of California at Los Angeles and Columbia University Graduate School of Journalism. He is a recipient of the Fulbright Fellowship in Creative Writing and the Lynton Award for Book Writing.

== Career ==
Garin Hovannisian is the author of the book Family of Shadows: A century of murder, memory, and the Armenian American dream, which traces the 100-year arc of his family story, from his great-grandfather's flight to America after surviving the Armenian genocide to his father Raffi Hovannisian's repatriation and subsequent climb to political prominence. The book won the Lynton Award for Book Writing.

His writing on Armenian issues, including the Armenian genocide and Armenia's struggle for democracy, has appeared in the Los Angeles Times, The New York Times, and The Atlantic.

In 2015, together with Alec Mouhibian, he founded the production company Avalanche Entertainment. Hovannisian and Mouhibian co-wrote, directed, and produced the film 1915 (2015), a psychological mystery set on the 100th anniversary of the Armenian Genocide. Critic Martin Tsai, in his Los Angeles Times review, identified 1915 as contemplating "personal tragedy versus collective grief, artistic license versus historical responsibility, revisionist history versus corrective narrative, forgetting versus moving on," and praised the film as a “creative way to do justice to such a monumental topic."1915 was released theatrically in the U.S. on April 17, 2015, and was the #2 box-office performing debut film on its opening weekend. It released widely in Russia on April 23 and Armenia on April 25. In December, 2015, it screened in Turkey as part of the Lake Van International Film Festival, where it won the Special Jury Prize. It was also awarded "Best Film" by the World Entertainment Armenian Awards.

He produced and directed I Am Not Alone (2019), a documentary on the 2018 Armenian velvet revolution. The film premiered at the 2019 Toronto International Film Festival, where it was first runner-up for the People's Choice Award for Documentaries. It has gone on to win the audience award at AFI Fest, Doc NYC, Omaha Film Festival, and Boulder International Film Festival, as well as jury awards for best feature at Big Sky Documentary Film Festival and Boulder International Film Festival.

In 2017, Hovannisian founded Creative Armenia, a global arts foundation that discovers, develops, and promotes innovative filmmakers, writers, musicians, and artists across all fields. Hovannisian serves as its founding director.

== Filmography ==
=== Director ===
- 1915 (Feature film, 2015)
- The Moment (TV miniseries, 2017)
- I Am Not Alone (Documentary, 2019)
- Truth to Power (Documentary, 2020)

=== Producer ===
- 1915 (Feature film, 2015)
- The Moment (TV miniseries, 2017)
- Children of War (Short film, 2017)
- I Am Not Alone (Documentary, 2019)
- Truth to Power (Documentary, 2020)

=== Writer ===
- 1915 (Feature film, 2015)
- The Moment (TV miniseries, 2017)
- I Am Not Alone (Documentary, 2019)
- Truth to Power (Documentary, 2020)
