= Axel Robin =

Canadian filmmaker

Axel Robin is a Canadian filmmaker. They are most noted for their 2025 short documentary film My Memory-Walls (Mes murs-mémoires), which was the winner of the award for Best Short Film at the 2026 Prix collégial du cinéma québécois.

Originally from Saint-Hubert, Quebec, they were educated at Cégep Édouard-Montpetit and Concordia University, and currently live and work in Montreal.

My Memory-Walls was also a Prix Iris nominee for Best Short Documentary at the 27th Quebec Cinema Awards in 2025, and a Canadian Screen Award nominee for Best Short Documentary at the 14th Canadian Screen Awards in 2026.

== Filmography ==
- After the Drinks (Après l'apéro) - 2019
- Undark - 2021
- Épisolaire - 2021
- Beyond the Off-Screen (Au-delà du hors-champ) - 2023
- My Memory-Walls (Mes murs-mémoires) - 2025
