= The Brother =

2019 Canadian short documentary film

- French: Le frère
- Directed by: Jérémie Battaglia
- Written by: Jérémie Battaglia
- Produced by: Amélie Lambert Bouchard
- Starring: Johan Fehd Karouani
- Cinematography: Jérémie Battaglia
- Edited by: Andrea Henriquez
- Music by: Anaïs Larocque
- Production companies: Les Films Extérieur Jour and PBS for POV
- Distributed by: Les Films du 3 mars
- Release date: 2020
- Running time: 28 minutes
- Country: Canada
- Language: French

The Brother (French: Le Frère) is a Canadian short documentary film, directed by Jérémie Battaglia and released in 2020. Blending live action with animation, the film tells a story of familial sacrifice and the bonds of brotherhood.

== Synopsis ==
Living with muscular dystrophy, a genetic disease that is causing him to lose the use of his body, Kaïs is awoken every morning by a different member of his family. While his body is paralyzed, at night he dreams that he is the hero of his favorite manga, along with his brothers, Fehd the bodybuilder and Zaid the ninja.

== Awards ==
The film won the first ever Prix Iris for Best Short Documentary at the 23rd Quebec Cinema Awards in 2021, and was a Canadian Screen Award nominee for Best Short Documentary at the 10th Canadian Screen Awards in 2022.
