= Red Snow (2019 film) =

2019 Canadian drama film

- Film poster
- Directed by: Marie Clements
- Written by: Marie Clements
- Produced by: Marie Clements; Lael McCall; Michelle Morris; Jonathan Tammuz
- Starring: Asivak Koostachin; Samuel Marty; Tarun Keram; Tantoo Cardinal; Mozhdah Jamalzadah
- Cinematography: Robert Aschmann; Roger Vernon
- Edited by: Jamie Alain; Rafi Spivak; Darryl Whetung
- Music by: Wayne Lavallee
- Production companies: Lily Pictures; MCMedia; Principia Productions; Zhoh Daatsik Pictures
- Release date: October 3, 2019 (VIFF)
- Running time: 100 minutes
- Country: Canada
- Languages: English; Gwich'in; Inuvialuktun; Pashto

Red Snow (Gwichʼin: Zhoh Daatsik, Inuvialuktun: Kaviqhak Apun, Pashto: سره واوره) is a 2019 Canadian war drama film, written and directed by Marie Clements. The film stars Asivak Koostachin as Dylan Nadazeau, a Gwich'in soldier serving in the Canadian Army during the War in Afghanistan, who is captured by the Taliban.

The film's cast also includes Tantoo Cardinal, Samuel Marty, Michelle Thrush, Tarun Keram, Mozhdah Jamalzadah, Steven Cree Molison and Leela Gilday. The film was shot in 2018 in various locations in the Northwest Territories and British Columbia, including Yellowknife, Dettah, Kamloops, Whistler and Cache Creek. It includes dialogue in Gwich'in, Inuvialuktun, Pashto and English.

The film premiered at the 2019 Vancouver International Film Festival, where it won the Audience Award for Most Popular Canadian Film. It subsequently won the award for Best Canadian Feature at the Edmonton International Film Festival.
