= Outside Center =

2023 Canadian short documentary film

- Directed by: Eli Jean Tahchi
- Written by: Eli Jean Tahchi
- Produced by: Béatrice Moukhaiber
- Starring: Desmond Grant
- Cinematography: Rita Hajjar
- Edited by: Eli Jean Tahchi
- Music by: Youssef Nassar; Stéphanie Hamelin Tomala
- Production company: Institut national de l'image et du son
- Distributed by: Travelling Distribution
- Release date: September 29, 2023 (VIFF)
- Running time: 20 minutes
- Countries: Canada; Germany
- Languages: English; German

Outside Center is a Canadian-German short documentary film, directed by Eli Jean Tahchi and released in 2023. The film centres on Desmond Grant, a Jamaican immigrant to Germany who is finding community and learning to embrace his identity as a gay man after joining a gay amateur rugby team.

Made as a student project for Tahchi's studies at the Institut national de l'image et du son, it became the first student film in the school's history to be picked up for commercial distribution.

The film premiered at the 2023 Vancouver International Film Festival.

The film received a special mention from the Best Student Documentary Short jury at the 2024 Palm Springs International Film Festival, and was a Prix Iris nominee for Best Short Documentary at the 26th Quebec Cinema Awards.
