= The Punk of Natashquan =

2025 Canadian documentary film

- French: Le Punk de Natashquan
- Directed by: Nicolas Lachapelle
- Written by: Nicolas Lachapelle
- Produced by: Élodie Pollet
- Starring: Ghislain Viger
- Cinematography: Étienne Roussy
- Edited by: Emmanuelle Lane
- Production company: Les Films Extérieur Jour
- Distributed by: Les Films du 3 mars
- Release date: March 19, 2025 (Regard)
- Running time: 20 minutes
- Country: Canada
- Language: French

The Punk of Natashquan (French: Le Punk de Natashquan) is a Canadian short documentary film, directed by Nicolas Lachapelle and released in 2025. The film retraces the story of Ghislain Viger, a man who moved to the small Quebec fishing village of Natashquan in 1981, and became a community fixture and icon until disappearing in 1986, with the still-unsolved mystery about his whereabouts continuing to impact the community to this day.

The film premiered at the Regard short film festival on March 19, 2025.

== Awards ==
Award	Date of ceremony	Category	Recipient(s)	Result	Ref.
Abitibi-Témiscamingue International Film Festival	2025	Prix Télé-Québec	Nicolas Lachapelle	Won	
Prix Iris	December 2025	Best Short Documentary	Nicolas Lachapelle, Élodie Pollet	Nominated	
Prix collégial du cinéma québécois	2026	Best Short Film	Nicolas Lachapelle	Nominated	
