= Sometimes I Wish I Was on a Desert Island =

2021 Canadian short documentary film

- French: Y’a des fois où j’aimerais me trouver sur une île déserte
- Directed by: Eli Jean Tahchi
- Written by: Eli Jean Tahchi
- Produced by: Pierre-Mathieu Fortin
- Edited by: Eli Jean Tahchi
- Music by: Stéphanie Hamelin Tomala
- Production company: National Film Board of Canada
- Release date: December 10, 2020
- Running time: 10 minutes
- Country: Canada
- Languages: English; French; Arabic

Sometimes I Wish I Was on a Desert Island (French: Y’a des fois où j’aimerais me trouver sur une île déserte) is a Canadian short documentary film, directed by Eli Jean Tahchi and released in 2020. Part of The Curve, a National Film Board of Canada series of short films on people's experiences during the COVID-19 pandemic in Canada, the film highlights the unique experiences of gay-identified Muslim men, a group who were already experiencing marginalization and ostracism even before COVID-related lockdowns, using a blend of animation and blurred or cropped footage to protect the identities of the speakers.

The film was a Prix Iris nominee for Best Short Documentary at the 24th Quebec Cinema Awards.
