= My Memory-Walls =

2025 Canadian documentary film

- French: Mes murs-mémoire
- Directed by: Axel Robin
- Written by: Axel Robin
- Starring: Rose Lévesque
- Cinematography: Léa Barsalou
- Edited by: Félix Bouffard-Dumas
- Music by: Louis-Joseph Cliche
- Distributed by: Welcome Aboard
- Release date: February 2025 (SBIFF)
- Running time: 12 minutes
- Country: Canada
- Language: French

My Memory-Walls (French: Mes murs-mémoire) is a Canadian short documentary film, directed by Axel Robin and released in 2025. The film is a portrait of Rose Lévesque, an elderly artist who has turned her house into a museum by painting murals of scenes from her life on every available wall.

The film premiered in February 2025 at the 40th Santa Barbara International Film Festival, and had its Canadian premiere in March at the Regard short film festival.

== Awards ==
Award	Date of ceremony	Category	Recipient(s)	Result	Ref.
Festival international du cinéma francophone en Acadie	November 2025	Best Canadian Short Film	Axel Robin	Honored	
Prix Iris	December 2025	Best Short Documentary	Axel Robin	Nominated	
Prix collégial du cinéma québécois	2026	Best Short Film	Axel Robin	Won	
Canadian Screen Awards	2026	Best Short Documentary	Axel Robin	Nominated	
