= I Am Not Alone =

2019 documentary film

- Film poster
- Directed by: Garin Hovannisian
- Written by: Garin Hovannisian
- Produced by: Eric Esrailian; Garin Hovannisian; Tatevik Manoukyan; Alec Mouhibian
- Starring: Nikol Pashinyan
- Cinematography: Vahe Terteryan
- Edited by: Barry Poltermann
- Music by: Serj Tankian
- Production companies: Avalanche Entertainment; Serjical Strike Entertainment
- Release date: September 7, 2019 (TIFF)
- Running time: 95 minutes
- Countries: Armenia; United States
- Languages: Armenian; English

I Am Not Alone is an Armenian-American documentary film, directed by Garin Hovannisian and released in 2019. The film profiles Armenian politician Nikol Pashinyan and his role in the 2018 Armenian revolution.

Music for the film was composed by Serj Tankian, who also participated as an executive producer.

The film premiered at the 2019 Toronto International Film Festival, where it was named first runner-up for the People's Choice Award for Documentaries.
