= All Cats Are Grey in the Dark =

2019 Swiss film

- German: Nachts sind alle Katzen grau
- Directed by: Lasse Linder
- Written by: Lasse Linder
- Produced by: Edith Flückiger
- Cinematography: Robin Angst
- Edited by: Michèle Flury
- Music by: Dominik Blumer; Roman Lerch; Thomi Christ
- Production company: Lucerne University of Applied Sciences and Arts
- Distributed by: Some Shorts
- Release date: 8 August 2019 (Locarno)
- Running time: 18 minutes
- Country: Switzerland

All Cats Are Grey in the Dark (German: Nachts sind alle Katzen grau) is a Swiss short documentary film, directed by Lasse Linder and released in 2019. The film centres on Christian, a lonely single man from Bregenz, Austria, who has decided to have his pet cat inseminated to help fulfill his own desire to become a parent.

The film was made as Linder's thesis project in the film studies program at Lucerne University of Applied Sciences and Arts.

The film premiered at the 72nd Locarno Film Festival. It was subsequently screened at the 2019 Toronto International Film Festival, where it won the award for Best International Short Film.

The film won the award for Best Short Film at the 33rd European Film Awards.
