= Zug Island =

Man-made island in Michigan, US

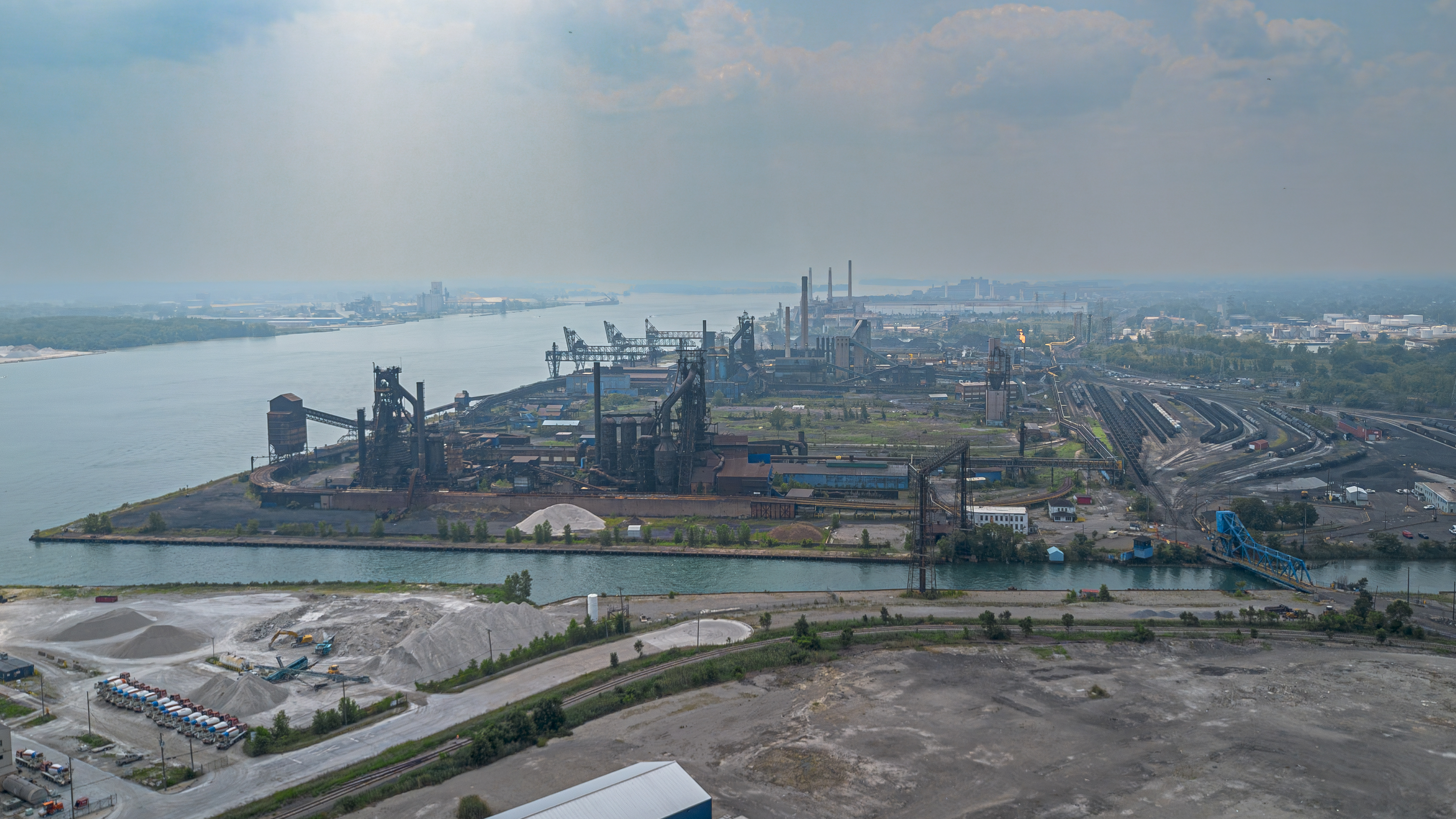
- Aerial image of an island in 2026

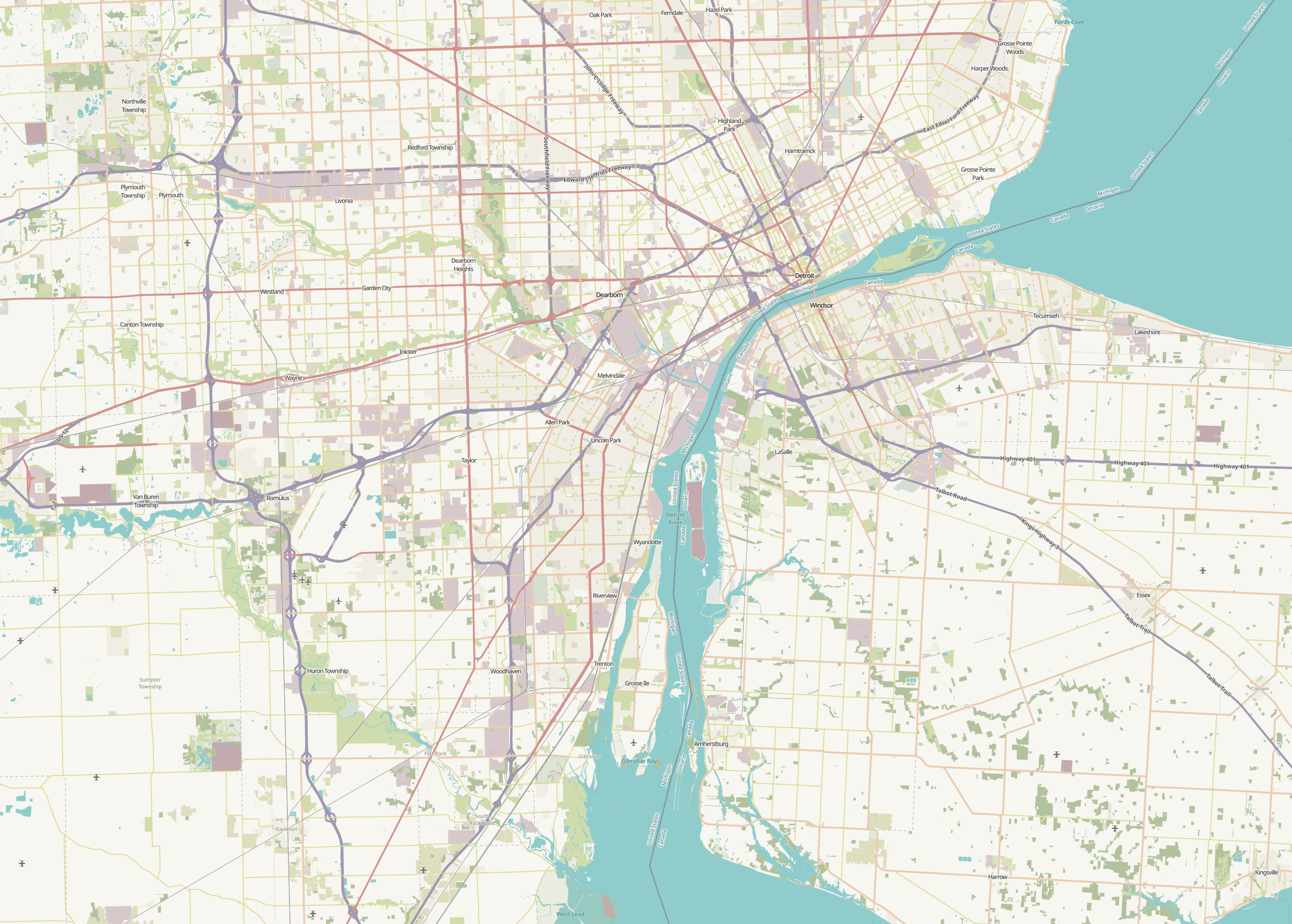
- Location within Wayne County, Michigan Location within Michigan Location within the United States

Geography
- Location: Detroit River, River Rouge, Michigan, U.S.
- Coordinates: 42°16′58″N 83°06′41″W
- Area: 0.93 sq mi (2.4 km^{2})
- Highest elevation: 571 ft (174 m)

Administration
- United States
- State: Michigan
- County: Wayne
- City: River Rouge

Demographics
- Population: 0 (permanent)

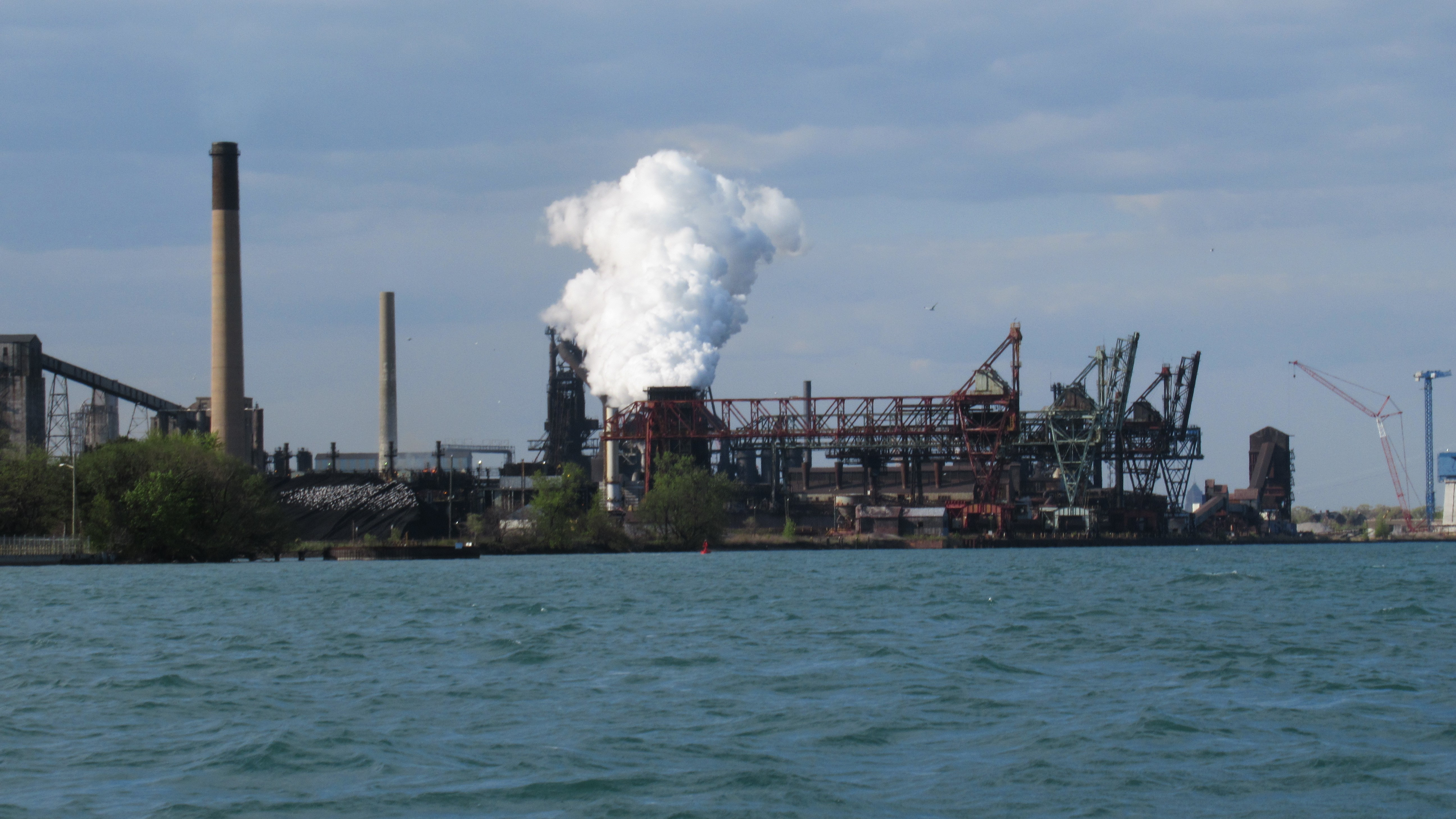
Zug Island, viewed from the Detroit River in May 2021

Zug Island /ˈzʊɡ/ is a heavily industrialized island within the city of River Rouge at the southern city limits of Detroit, Michigan. It is located at the confluence of River Rouge at the Detroit River. Zug Island is not a natural island in the river; it was formed when a shipping canal was dug along the southwestern side of the island, allowing ships to bypass several hundred yards of twisting waterway near the mouth of the River Rouge.

== History ==
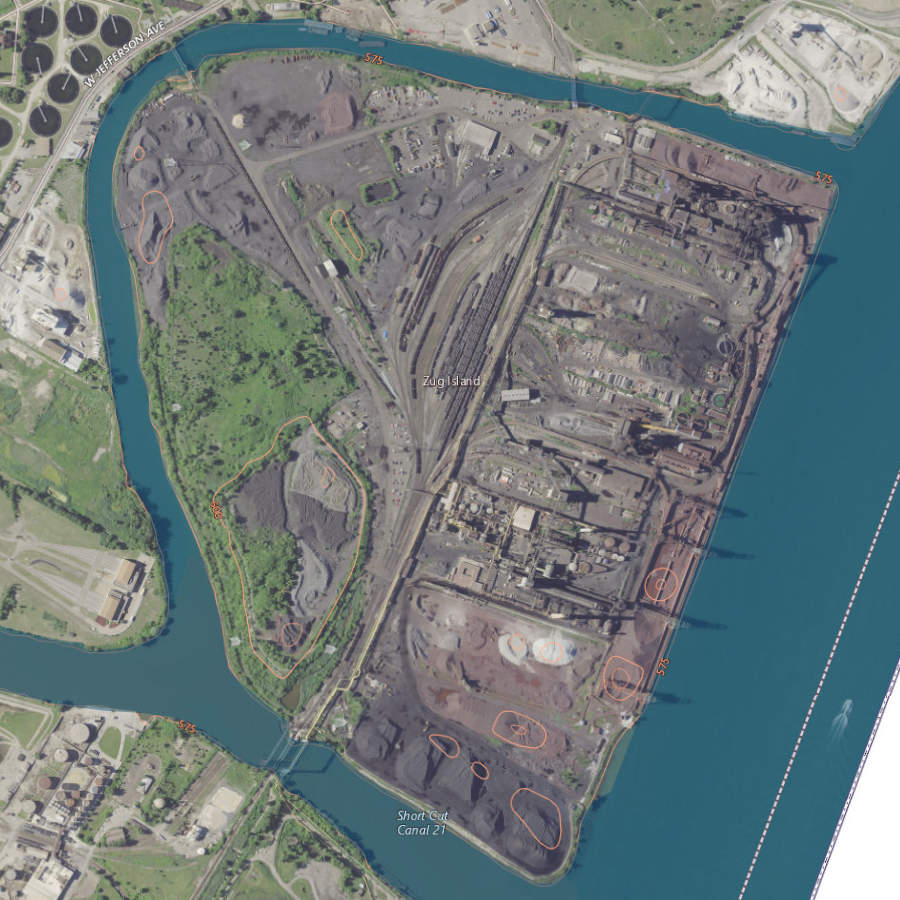
USGS aerial imagery of Zug Island

Originally a marsh-filled peninsula at the mouth of the River Rouge, the territory now known as Zug Island served as an uninhabited Native American burial ground for thousands of years. Upon European arrival, the land was incorporated into Ecorse Township, making up the very northeast corner of the township. The beginning of interest in developing the land came when Samuel Zug, one of the founders of the Republican Party and a staunch abolitionist, came to Detroit from Cumberland County, Pennsylvania, in 1836 to make his fortune in the furniture industry with the money he earned as a bookkeeper. Shortly after, Marcus Stevenson, a Detroit financier, went into business with him.

The Stevenson & Zug Furniture Company flourished until 1859 when Zug, by then a rich man, dissolved the partnership. He decided to invest in real estate to provide security for his wife, Anna. Envisioning a luxurious estate on the Detroit River, Zug bought 325 acres (1.32 km^{2}) of marshy land below Fort Wayne from the town of Delray in 1876. But the dampness was too much for the Zugs, and after 10 years they abandoned their home.

In 1888, Zug allowed the River Rouge Improvement Company to cut a small canal through the south section of his property to more directly connect the Rouge River to the Detroit River. This Short Cut Canal, as it came to be known, was enlarged in the early 1920s by Henry Ford to allow large ships to more easily navigate to the Ford River Rouge Complex. In 1891, Zug sold his island for $300,000 ($10.8 million in 2025) to industries that wanted it as a dumping ground.

Zug became interested in politics and served as Wayne County Auditor under Gov. John J. Bagley. He died in 1896 at age 80.

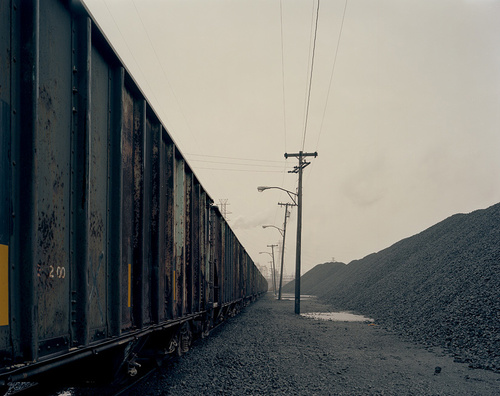
Coke train, Zug Island, 2009.

== Steel mill ==
The Detroit Iron & Steel Co. brought ironmaking to Zug Island (and modern iron smelting to the state of Michigan, which theretofore had only charcoal furnaces), with the construction of a blast furnace in 1902. In 1904 the works was purchased by the M.A. Hanna Company of Cleveland, Ohio, which built a second blast furnace in 1909. At this time the island's two furnaces were reportedly the largest of their kind in the world, producing pig iron for foundry companies. The plant expanded and became part of the Great Lakes Steel Corporation in 1931, becoming a key component of a fully integrated steel mill and a division of the larger National Steel Corporation. A third blast furnace was added in early 1938 while the existing furnaces were rebuilt and enlarged.

When National Steel became insolvent in 2003, most steel facilities and the rest of what is now called the Great Lakes Works, were purchased by United States Steel, which currently operates the mill. The ironmaking facilities include 3 blast furnaces ("A", "B" and "D") and raw materials storage areas (the rest of the mill's facilities, primarily steelmaking and processing, are located at the main plant a few miles south in Ecorse. Ships supply large ore docks along the north ("1 Dock") and east ("3 Dock") shores and large coal/coke/ore storage fields along the south and west ("B Area") shores. Number 5 Coke Battery, once an integral part of the mill, is independently owned and operated by EES Coke LLC, a DTE Energy company. Delray Connecting Railroad, a subsidiary of Transtar, LLC, operates some rail facilities on the island. A "2-way" vehicle/rail bridge is the main access to the island. Secondary vehicle and rail bridges (the "Swing Bridge") at the southwestern corner of the island also allow mainland access.

Iron produced at Zug Island is transported in bottle cars via rail to steelmaking at the main plant while DTE's coke is shipped via rail to supply consumers, chiefly ISG/Mittal, in the merchant metallurgical market. During the industry's peak, thousands of workers were employed on the island with a large percentage of the downriver community supported by the local steel producer. Recently a few hundred people worked on the island with the hourly workers at U.S. Steel represented by United Steelworkers Local 1299.

U.S. Steel announced in December 2019 that it would idle most of its operations in the area, including all of its operations on Zug Island. Primary steelmaking activities shut down in April 2020, and the hot strip mill shut down in June 2020; however in January 2021 the Detroit Free Press reported that there remained 500 employees working at the plant, and that "a few operations [were] ongoing — as long as demand will support them".

== Wildlife ==
Despite the heavily developed industrial landscape, areas along the south and west shores have been left undeveloped to provide habitat for wildlife. Foxes and once-endangered peregrine falcons, which frequent large outdoor structures such as the gantry cranes at the ore docks, thrive on the island and offshore. At the bottom of the Detroit River is a man-made bed of coal cinders which serves as a rare spawning site for lake sturgeon, a threatened species.

== Environmental impact ==
One of the most pressing problems in the neighborhoods surrounding Zug Island is poor air quality. According to an article in the January 20, 2010, edition of the Detroit Free Press, the neighborhoods around the area compose six of the ten most polluted zip codes in Michigan. In the article, residents cite air quality samples containing lead and high levels of methyl ethyl ketone, large numbers of cancer and asthma cases, and foul smells with "sparkly" dust that can only be removed with toilet cleaner.

=== Noise and vibration ===
In 2011, the Zug Island area was identified by Canadian scientists and Ontario's Ministry of Natural Resources as the source of mysterious rumblings and vibrations, known as "The Hum", that plagued hundreds of area residents with cyclical vibrations, reportedly being felt in the ground up to 50 miles (80 km) away. The city of River Rouge reported that it could not afford to spend any more money on investigating the hum, claiming the City Council had already spent over $1 million to help Windsor and Ontario find the source of the noise, and that the hum likely comes from the steel mill facilities on the island.

In 2013, a Canadian scientist used sound-level meters and a portable "pentangular array" of cameras and microphones to try to accurately identify the source of the sound, in order to know whom exactly to ask to fix it. Although contemporaneous news reports claim the study confirmed that Zug Island was the source of the hum, the report's findings state "the most probable source of the Hum points well to the South of Zug Island. The bulk of our observations from both stations do not support the hypothesis that the source of the Hum emanates from Zug Island."

Reports of the Hum ceased after the US Steel plant on Zug Island ceased operations in April 2020.

== In popular culture ==
The island is mostly off-limits to the public. Cameras are prohibited on the premises, so pictures of the island's interior are rare. Due to its location and relative security, many urban legends exist regarding the island. One popular legend claims that the island is home to a correctional facility or prison, but no such facility exists on the island. Another popular claim is that parts of the movie RoboCop were filmed there. Although Zug Island is mentioned by name in the movie, the steel mill shots in RoboCop were actually filmed at the Wheeling-Pittsburgh Steel Corp.'s Monessen Works in Pennsylvania.

The SS Edmund Fitzgerald of Great Lakes shipwreck fame was laden with taconite destined for Zug Island on her fateful voyage in 1975.

In 2011, Detroit based author Gregory Fournier published his novel, Zug Island: A Detroit Riot Novel.

Zug Izland, a Detroit-based rock band in association with Insane Clown Posse, named themselves after the island and self describe their sound as "Juggalo Rock". ICP themselves have made references to Zug Island in their songs "The Shaggy Show", "In the Haughhh!" "Cotton Candy & Popsicles" and "Toxic Love". This is likely due to its proximity to the Delray/River Rouge area, where the members spent some of their youth. In fact, part of the island can be seen in the background of the cover photo for Insane Clown Posse (at the time, Inner City Posse)'s EP, Dog Beats.

== See also ==
- Michigan, geography of
