= Jérémie Battaglia =

French director and cinematographer

- Born: May 17, 1983 (age 42); Aix-en-Provence, France
- Occupation(s): Director, writer, cinematographer
- Years active: 2004–present

Jérémie Battaglia is a French Canadian director and cinematographer. He is best known for his documentary films Casseroles, Perfect (Parfaites) and The Brother (Le frère).

== Career ==
Battaglia was first recognized for the musical documentary Casseroles, about the 2012 Quebec student protests.

In 2016, he directed the feature documentary Perfect (Parfaites), about the Canada's synchronized swimming team as they prepare for the 2016 Summer Olympics. In 2021, he directed the documentary short The Brother (Le frère), about a young boy living with muscular dystrophy.

His feature film The Sum of Our Dreams premiered at the FIFA festival in March 2022.

A French Youth (Une jeunesse française) premiered at the 2024 Hot Docs Canadian International Documentary Festival, and was longlisted for the 2024 Jean-Marc Vallée DGC Discovery Award.

== Filmography ==
Year	Title	Contribution	Note
2012	Casseroles	Cinematographer	Musical documentary
2013	Anna et Otto	Cinematographer	Feature film
2016	Perfect (Parfaites)	Director, writer and cinematographer	Documentary
2018	A Wall Within	Cinematographer	Documentary
2018	Art Is My Country	Cinematographer	Documentary
2019	HAK_MTL	Cinematographer	Documentary
2020	Pivot	Director and cinematographer	Documentary
2021	Post humains	Director	Documentary
2021	La goutte de trop	Director and cinematographer	Documentary
2021	The Brother (Le frère)	Director, writer and cinematographer	Documentary short
2022	The Sum of Our Dreams	Director	Feature film
2024	A French Youth (Une jeunesse française)	Director	Feature film
2024	Adonis	Director	Television documentary

== Awards and nominations ==
Year	Award	Category	Work	Result	Ref.
2017	Prix Iris	Best Cinematography in a Documentary	Perfect (Parfaites)	Nominated	
2017	Prix Iris	Best Short Documentary	Perfect (Parfaites)	Nominated	
2021	Prix Iris	Best Short Documentary	The Brother (Le frère)	Won	
2022	Canadian Screen Awards	Best Short Documentary	The Brother (Le frère)	Nominated	
