= Rob Scheer =

Robert “Rob” Scheer is an American public figure and the founder of Comfort Cases, a nonprofit organization that works in the United States and United Kingdom to eliminate the use of trash bags for youth in foster care by providing luggage and essential items. Scheer founded the organization due to his personal experience while in foster care. Scheer has been featured in public coverage connected to foster care advocacy and awareness, including a TEDx talk about his work through Comfort Cases.

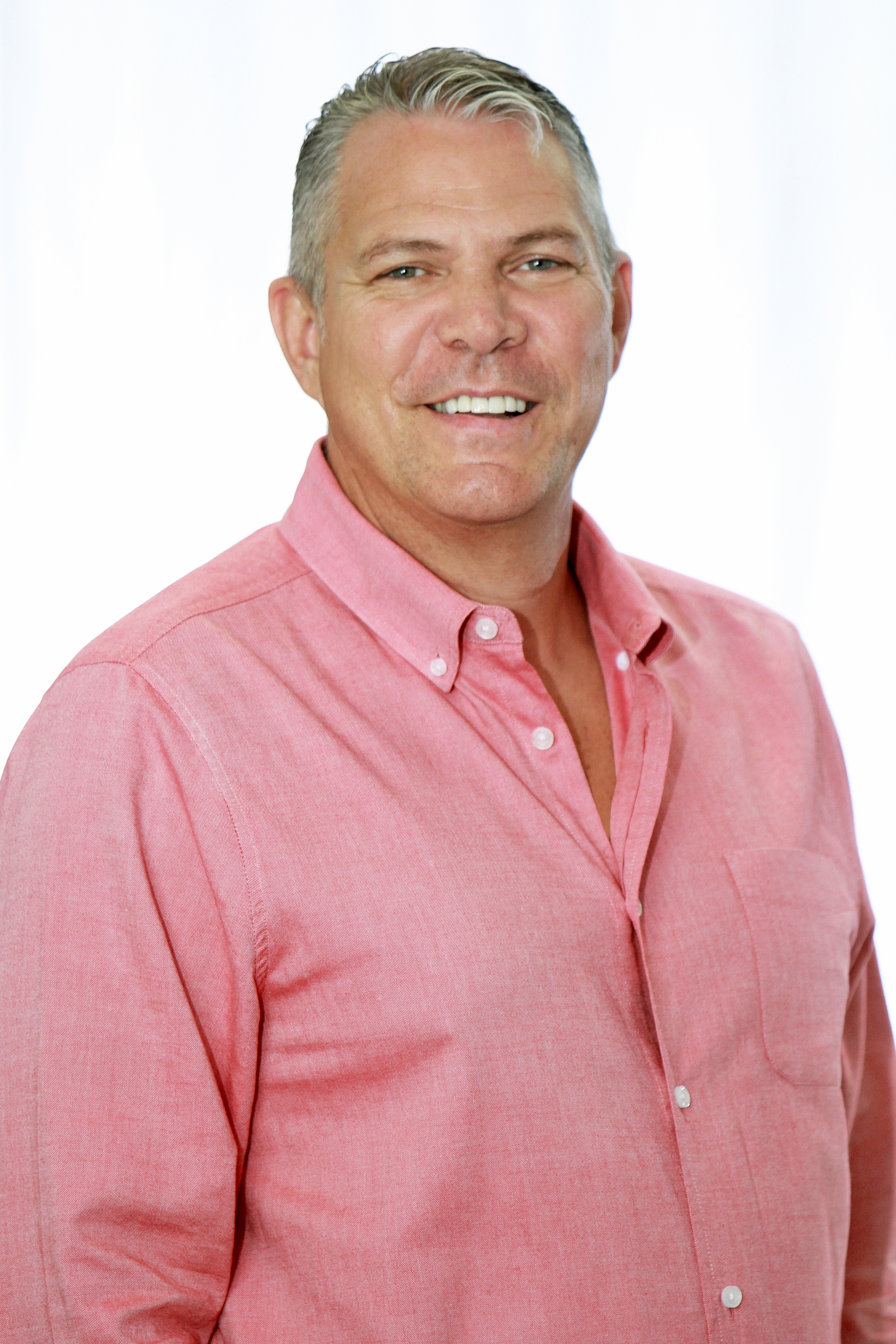
Photographed by Elizabeth Chomas in 2018

== Personal life ==
Scheer has said he grew up in foster care and experienced homelessness as a teenager after aging out. Scheer lives in Maryland with his husband, Reece, and five adopted children.

== Career ==
Scheer has been publicly connected to state-level efforts addressing the use of trash bags for foster youth, including testifying around a Maryland bill that would require the state to provide luggage for children in foster care. He is the author of the memoir A Forever Family: Fostering Change One Child at a Time, which recounts his experiences in foster care and as an adoptive parent.

In 2019, The National Council For Adoption recognized Scheer with the Warren and Mary Alice Babineaux Award. In 2022, Lynn University honored Scheer at commencement and documented him receiving an honorary degree. In June 2025, the Savannah Bananas honored the founders of Comfort Cases during their Washington, D.C. appearance. Scheer has also appeared in a television show and documentary – he is featured in Season 1, Episode 5 (“Foster Families”) of Somewhat Familiar with Pedro Andrade on HBO Max, which describes Pedro meeting “Robert” in Maryland who helps other children after experiencing foster care himself, and was interviewed in the Bryce Dallas Howard film “Dads”. Scheer was also featured on CBS News, The Ellen DeGeneres Show, and The Today Show to discuss the work of Comfort Cases.

== Bibliography ==
A Forever Family: Fostering Change One Child at a Time (2019)
