= Prix Iris for Best Short Documentary =

Annual Canadian film award

The Prix Iris for Best Short Documentary (French: Prix Iris de la meilleur court métrage documentaire) is an annual award, presented by Québec Cinéma as part of its Prix Iris program, to honour the best short documentary films made in the Cinema of Quebec. The award was presented for the first time at the 23rd Quebec Cinema Awards in 2021.

Producers Kat Baulu, Ariel Nasr and director Jérémie Battaglia, who all have won in this category, also received nominations in the Best Documentary category.

== 2020s ==
| Year | Film | Filmmaker(s) | Ref |
|---|---|---|---|
2021; 23rd Quebec Cinema Awards
| 2021; 23rd Quebec Cinema Awards | The Brother (Le frère) | Jérémie Battaglia, Amélie Lambert Bouchard | |
| 2021; 23rd Quebec Cinema Awards | Homeport (Port d'attache) | Laurence Lévesque, Élise Bois | |
| 2021; 23rd Quebec Cinema Awards | Life of a Dog | Danae Elon, Rosana Matecki, Paul Cadieux | |
| 2021; 23rd Quebec Cinema Awards | Mutts (Clebs) | Halima Ouardiri | |
| 2021; 23rd Quebec Cinema Awards | Nitrate | Yousra Benziane | |
2022; 24th Quebec Cinema Awards
| 2022; 24th Quebec Cinema Awards | Perfecting the Art of Longing | Kitra Cahana, Kat Baulu, Ariel Nasr | |
| 2022; 24th Quebec Cinema Awards | Babushka | Kristina Wagenbauer, Line Sander Egede | |
| 2022; 24th Quebec Cinema Awards | Sometimes I Wish I Was on a Desert Island (Y’a des fois où j’aimerais me trouver sur une île déserte) | Eli Jean Tahchi, Pierre-Mathieu Fortin | |
| 2022; 24th Quebec Cinema Awards | The Truss Arch | Sonya Stefan | |
| 2022; 24th Quebec Cinema Awards | Under the Sleeping Mountain (Sous la montagne endormie) | Charles Duquet, Mérédith Gonzalez-Bayard | |
2023; 25th Quebec Cinema Awards
| 2023; 25th Quebec Cinema Awards | About Memory and Loss (Notes sur la mémoire et l'oubli) | Amélie Hardy, Isabelle Grignon-Francke | |
| 2023; 25th Quebec Cinema Awards | Belle River | Guillaume Fournier, Samuel Matteau, Yannick Nolin, Jean-Pierre Vézina | |
| 2023; 25th Quebec Cinema Awards | Fire-Jo-Ball | Audrey Nantel-Gagnon, Nathalie Cloutier | |
| 2023; 25th Quebec Cinema Awards | Oasis | Justine Martin, Louis-Emmanuel Gagné-Brochu | |
| 2023; 25th Quebec Cinema Awards | Zug Island | Guillaume Collin, Nicolas Lachapelle | |
2024; 26th Quebec Cinema Awards
| 2024; 26th Quebec Cinema Awards | Vibrations from Gaza | Rehab Nazzal | |
| 2024; 26th Quebec Cinema Awards | Afterwards (Après-coups) | Romane Garant Chartrand, Nathalie Cloutier | |
| 2024; 26th Quebec Cinema Awards | Outside Center | Eli Jean Tahchi, Béatrice Moukhaiber | |
| 2024; 26th Quebec Cinema Awards | Perséides | Laurence Lévesque, Line Sander Egede | |
| 2024; 26th Quebec Cinema Awards | The Sparkle (L'Artifice) | Isabelle Grignon-Francke, Patrick Francke-Sirois | |
2025; 27th Quebec Cinema Awards
| 2025; 27th Quebec Cinema Awards | Who Loves the Sun | Arshia Shakiba, Zaynê Akyol | |
| 2025; 27th Quebec Cinema Awards | After the Silence (Après le silence) | Matilde-Luna Perotti | |
| 2025; 27th Quebec Cinema Awards | Like a Spiral (Comme une spirale) | Lamia Chraibi, Patricia Bergeron, Ghassan Fayad | |
| 2025; 27th Quebec Cinema Awards | The Punk of Natashquan (Le Punk de Natashquan) | Nicolas Lachapelle, Élodie Pollet | |
| 2025; 27th Quebec Cinema Awards | My Memory-Walls (Mes murs-mémoire) | Axel Robin | |

== See also ==
- Canadian Screen Award for Best Short Documentary
