= Eli Jean Tahchi =

Lebanese Canadian filmmaker

Eli Jean Tahchi is a Lebanese Canadian filmmaker based in Montreal, Quebec. He is most noted as a two-time Prix Iris nominee for Best Short Documentary, receiving nods at the 24th Quebec Cinema Awards in 2022 for Sometimes I Wish I Was on a Desert Island (Y’a des fois où j’aimerais me trouver sur une île déserte), and at the 26th Quebec Cinema Awards in 2024 for Outside Center.

== Biography ==
A graduate of the Lebanese Academy of Fine Arts, he moved to Canada in 2011 to study film at the Université de Montréal and the Institut national de l'image et du son. He later stated that moving to Quebec helped to establish his identity as an "Arab-Quebecer-LGBTQ-citizen-of-the-world artist".

Sometimes I Wish I Was on a Desert Island, about the social isolation of LGBTQ Muslims, was made as part of The Curve, a National Film Board of Canada series of short films on people's experiences during the COVID-19 pandemic in Canada. Outside Centre, about a Jamaican immigrant finding community with a gay rugby team after immigrating to Germany, was made as a student film in his studies at INIS, but became the first INIS student film ever to be acquired for commercial distribution.

In 2024 he created La Dernière communion, a comedy-drama web series about three Roman Catholic priests rebuilding their lives after retiring from the priesthood. The series premiered theatrically in October at the Abitibi-Témiscamingue International Film Festival, where it was the winner of the Prix Fonds Bell, before premiering on the website of Télé-Québec in December.

In October 2026, he served on the jury for the Queer Louve award at the 2026 Festival du nouveau cinéma, alongside writer Gabrielle Boulianne-Tremblay and drag queen Sami Landri.

== Filmography ==
- Geometry - 2014
- She Is Lars - 2014
- The Migrant Woman (La Femme migrante) - 2015
- By the Wind (Au gré du vent) - 2016
- The Migrant Mixtape (La Cassette Migrante) - 2017
- Days of Rage (Jours de rage) - 2019
- Fissure - 2019
- Sometimes I Wish I Was on a Desert Island (Y’a des fois où j’aimerais me trouver sur une île déserte) - 2020
- Neighbors in My Backyard (Des voisins dans ma cour) - 2021
- Outside Center - 2023
- La Dernière communion - 2024
- 0004ngel - 2025
