= Yannick Nolin =

Canadian film director and cinematographer

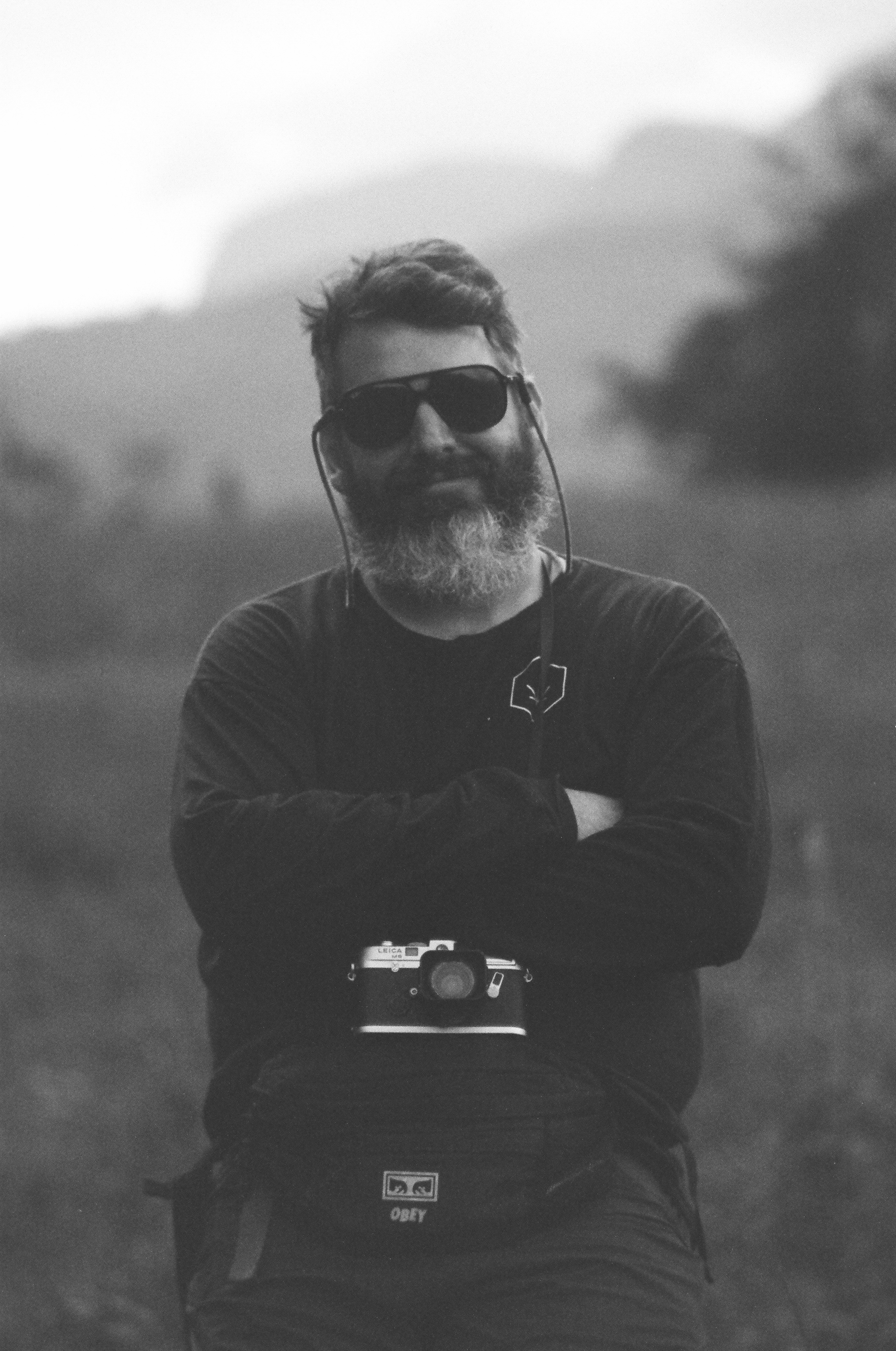
- Yannick Nolin in 2023
- Born: Quebec, Canada
- Occupations: Film director, cinematographer
- Years active: 2017–present
- Notable work: Laissez les bon temps rouler, Acadiana, Belle River
- Website: IMDb

Yannick Nolin is a Canadian film director and cinematographer from Quebec. He is most noted as co-director with Guillaume Fournier and Samuel Matteau of a trilogy of short documentary films about Cajun life and culture in Louisiana.

The first film in the series, Laissez les bon temps rouler, premiered in 2017.

The second film in the series, Acadiana, premiered at the 2019 Slamdance Film Festival. At the 2019 Vancouver International Film Festival, the directors won the award for Most Promising Director of a Canadian Short Film. It was subsequently named to the Toronto International Film Festival's annual year-end Canada's Top Ten list for short films in 2019, and received a Canadian Screen Award nomination for Best Short Documentary at the 8th Canadian Screen Awards in 2020.

The third film, Belle River, premiered at the 2022 Clermont-Ferrand International Short Film Festival. It was named to Canada's Top Ten list for short films in 2022, and was a Prix Iris nominee for Best Short Documentary at the 25th Quebec Cinema Awards in 2023.
