= Acadiana (film) =

2019 Canadian film

- Film poster
- Directed by: Guillaume Fournier; Samuel Matteau; Yannick Nolin
- Written by: Guillaume Fournier
- Produced by: Jean-Pierre Vézina
- Cinematography: Yannick Nolin
- Edited by: Samuel Matteau
- Music by: Mathieu Cantin; Samuel Matteau; Mathieu Robineau
- Production company: Projet Kinomada
- Distributed by: Spira
- Release date: January 26, 2019 (Slamdance)
- Running time: 10 minutes
- Country: Canada
- Language: English

Acadiana is a 2019 Canadian short documentary film directed by Guillaume Fournier, Samuel Matteau and Yannick Nolin. The film explores the changing face of Cajun culture in the United States, and its roots in the Acadian culture of Canada, through a profile of the Crawfish Festival in Breaux Bridge, Louisiana. The film was the second part of a trilogy by the directors about Cajun culture, following Let the Good Times Roll (Laissez les bon temps rouler) in 2017 and preceding Belle River in 2022.

The film premiered at the 2019 Slamdance Film Festival.

At the 2019 Vancouver International Film Festival, the directors won the award for Most Promising Director of a Canadian Short Film. In December 2019, the film was named to the Toronto International Film Festival's annual year-end Canada's Top Ten list for short films.

The film received a Canadian Screen Award nomination for Best Short Documentary at the 8th Canadian Screen Awards in 2020.
