= Tapeworm (film) =

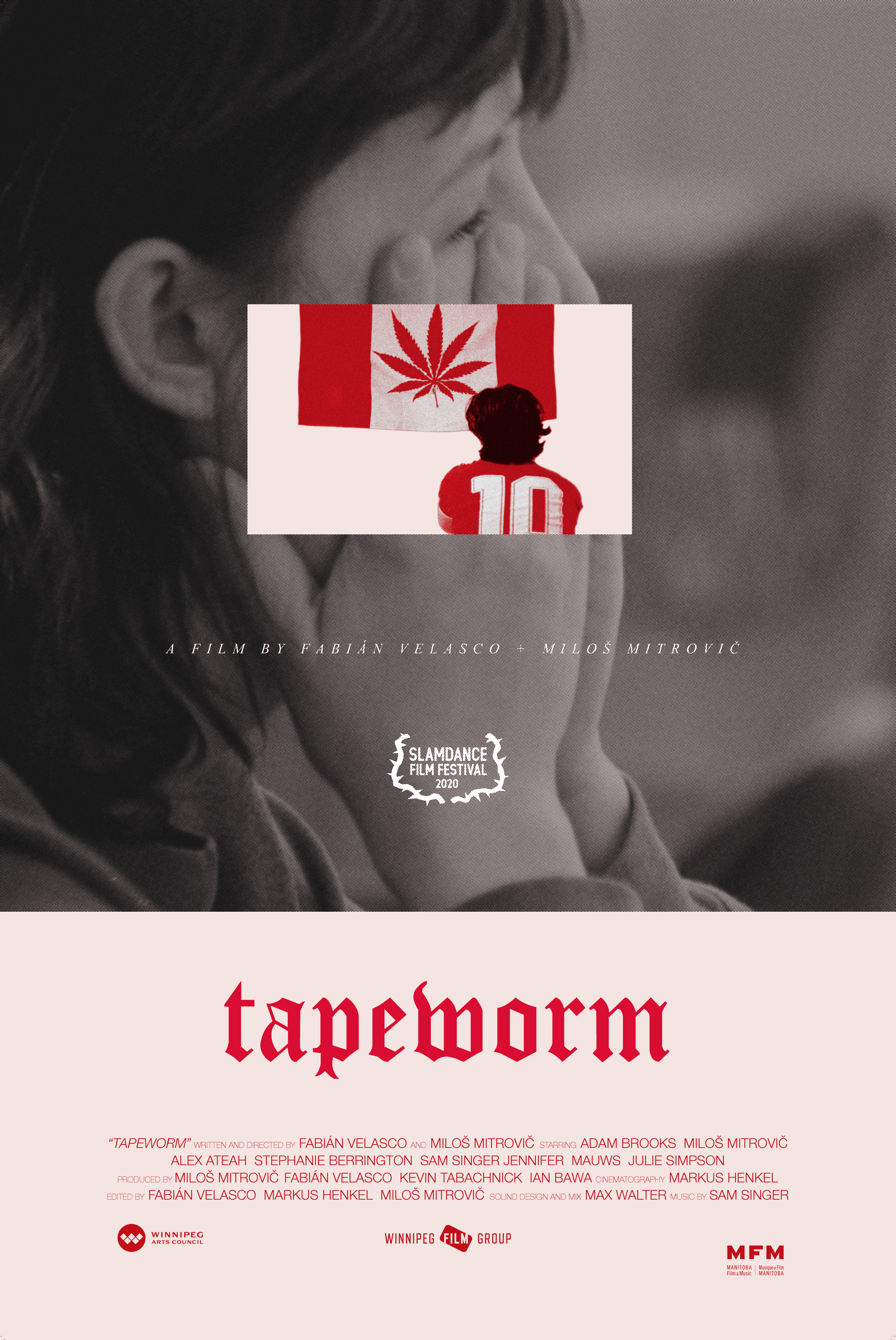
- Film Poster
- Directed by: Fabian Velasco; Milos Mitrovic
- Screenplay by: Milos Mitrovic; Fabian Velasco
- Produced by: Milos Mitrovic; Adam Brooks; Stephanie Berrington; Fabian Velasco; Kevin Tabachnick; Ian Bawa
- Cinematography: Markus Henkle
- Edited by: Markus Henkle; Fabian Velasco; Milos Mitrovic
- Release date: September 2019 (VIFF)
- Running time: 77 minutes
- Country: Canada
- Language: English

Tapeworm is a 2019 dark comedy directed by Milos Mitrovic and Fabian Velasco. It had its world premiere in the Future//Present section of the 2019 Vancouver International Film Festival.

Described as an "anti-comedy", Tapeworm explores the loosely interconnected, mundane and miserable lives of a hypochondriac, a failed stand up comedian, two stoners and a loner living in Winnipeg, Manitoba. Each of the characters are notable mostly for how bleak and joyless their existence has become. The film went on to have its European premiere at the Tallinn Black Nights Film Festival and its US premiere at Slamdance Film Festival.

== Cast ==
- Adam Brooks
- Alex Ateah
- Stephanie Berrington
- Sam Singer
- Milos Mitrovic
- Jennifer Mauws
- Julie Simpson

== Production ==
Tapeworm was shot on 16mm film on a shoe string budget. Using mostly non-professional actors, Mitrovic and Velasco took a very improvisational approach to the film, finding inspiration from real life experiences living in Winnipeg. Speaking to Variety magazine, Mitrovic and Velasco explained "We shot the film on Super 16, which gave it a great texture with lots of grain. We really wanted to make a film that showed how bleak it can be to live in Canada. We’ve been making movies for 10 years, and we put so much of our passion for cinema into this project, so it’s very special”

Tapeworm was filmed entirely in Winnipeg, Manitoba, Canada.

== Reception ==
Tapeworm received generally mixed reviews, Nick Rocco Scalie of Film threat wrote "It's as jarring, in its own way, as the gross-out in the opening scene - and, maybe, it suggests that the best way to view Tapeworm is not as provocation, but rather, as something like a passion play." Rob Dean of Daily Grindhouse gave it a favourable review writing, "TAPEWORM isn’t so weird that it’s a bonkers hidden gem, and it’s not so dark or cruel that it’s for the joyless gluttons of misery, either." Mallory Moore of Elements of Madness gave it a 4 out of 5 star rating writing "While it may not be the most original work, Tapeworm is more than redeemed by its technical precision and authentic performances." While Ian Thomas Malone wrote a less favourable review writing "the problem with Tapeworm isn't that it's a joyless experience. The film doesn't make you feel anything at all".
