= Jarvik (film) =

2019 film

- Film poster
- Directed by: Émilie Mannering
- Written by: Caroline Becker
- Produced by: Johannie Deschambault
- Starring: Léïa Scott; Maxime Roberge; Maëlla Gougeon-Larouche; Monia Chokri
- Cinematography: Étienne Roussy
- Edited by: Myriam Magassouba
- Release date: September 5, 2019 (TIFF)
- Running time: 19 minutes
- Country: Canada
- Language: French

Jarvik is a Canadian short drama film, directed by Émilie Mannering and released in 2019. The film centres on a young girl (Léïa Scott) whose desire for freedom conflicts with the medical limitations experienced by her brother (Maxime Roberge), who has an artificial heart. The film's cast also includes Maëlla Gougeon-Larouche and Monia Chokri.

The film premiered at the 2019 Toronto International Film Festival. It was subsequently screened at the Festival du nouveau cinéma, where it won the award for Most Popular Short Film. In December 2019, the film was named to TIFF's annual year-end Canada's Top Ten list for short films.
