= The Day After I'm Gone =

The Day After I'm Gone (Hebrew: היום שאחרי לכתי) is a 2019 Israeli drama film, a low-budget debut of the director and screenwriter Nimrod Eldar (נמרוד אלדר).

== Synopsys ==
Yoram, a middle-aged man, a veterinary at the Ramat Gan Safari, had lost his wife, and is recovering from this, but he retreated into himself and fails to communicate with his teenage daughter Roni. After she attempts to commit suicide, he takes her on a several day vacation to visit the relatives of the family's mother, and this restores the links between the two. The title of the film refers to the dialog discussing what would have happened if Roni died.

== Production ==
In 2015 the film received an award from Sam Spiegel Film and Television School's First Feature Fund while the film was in development. The award citation says "For unconventional and stylish writing, dense and powerful, intimate and direct, of a journey of a single father and his daughter towards each other, two lost Israeli characters, who undergo a fascinating process of self- and mutual discovery". The film was also supported by the Israel Film Fund.

It was bought for distribution in the United States by HBO.

== Reception ==
Critics note that the film is promising in the beginning, but it lacks a proper resolution. In particular, Yael Shove comments that Yoram seems to remain the same, stiff, grumpy person and notes that the character of Roni is underdeveloped.

The film was screened at a number of festivals and nominated for a number of awards. Of these, it received a special jury diploma at Molodist film festival Kyiv, Ukraine and Young Film Critics Award at Transatlantyk Festival, Lodz, Poland.
