= DOXA Documentary Film Festival =

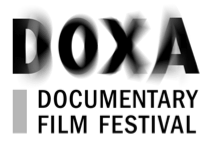
- Location: 750 Hamilton Street; Unit 110; Vancouver, British Columbia; V6B 2R5
- Founded: 2000
- Founded by: The Documentary Media Society (incorporated in 1998)
- Festival date: Annually in May
- Language: International
- Website: https://www.doxafestival.ca/

The DOXA Documentary Film Festival is a documentary film festival based in Vancouver, British Columbia, Canada. It is held annually for 10 days in May, and is presented by The Documentary Media Society, a non-profit organization.

The festival was staged for the first time in 2000. Originally intended as a once-only event, by the time of its launch the organizers had decided to organize a permanent biennial festival; following the second festival in 2002, it became an annual event thereafter.

== Awards ==
DOXA award winners are given on the basis of three major criteria: "success and innovation in the realization of the project’s concept; originality and relevance of subject matter and approach; and overall artistic and technical proficiency." Jury members are filmmakers, film critics, and industry professionals.

- DOXA Feature Documentary Award
- Colin Low Award for Canadian Documentary
- Nigel Moore Award for Youth Programming
- DOXA Short Documentary Award
