= Throat Singing in Kangirsuk =

2019 film

- Inuktitut: Katatjatuuk Kangirsumi
- Directed by: Eva Kaukai; Manon Chamberland
- Written by: Eva Kaukai; Manon Chamberland
- Produced by: Manon Barbeau
- Starring: Eva Kaukai; Manon Chamberland
- Cinematography: Saviluk Thomassie; Emilie Baillargeon; Clark Ferguson
- Edited by: Emilie Baillargeon
- Music by: Eva Kaukai; Manon Chamberland
- Production company: Wapikoni Mobile
- Release date: January 24, 2019 (Sundance)
- Running time: 3 minutes
- Country: Canada
- Language: Inuktitut

Throat Singing in Kangirsuk (Inuktitut: Katatjatuuk Kangirsumi) is a Canadian short documentary film, directed by Eva Kaukai and Manon Chamberland and released in 2019. The film depicts Kaukai and Chamberland, two Inuit teenagers from Kangirsuk, Quebec, performing Inuit throat singing over scenes of the changing seasonal landscape in the community.

The film premiered at the 2019 Sundance Film Festival. Following the screening, the duo performed a live demonstration of throat singing, their first time ever performing music outside their own community.

== Reception ==
Writing for Film Threat, Lorry Kikta praised the film as "a breathtaking visual tour that somehow shows us the entire spirit of the people in only a little over three minutes. It’s very effective and impressive, considering that the creative forces behind it are teenagers."

In December 2019, the film was named to the Toronto International Film Festival's annual year-end Canada's Top Ten list for short films.
