= Nicolas Lachapelle =

Canadian documentary filmmaker

Nicolas Lachapelle is a Canadian documentary filmmaker from Quebec. He is most noted for his 2022 short documentary film Zug Island, which was a Prix Iris nominee for Best Short Documentary at the 25th Quebec Cinema Awards in 2023, and a Canadian Screen Award nominee for Best Short Documentary at the 12th Canadian Screen Awards in 2024.

His prior films have included Lights Above Water (Lumières sur l'eau) and What Remains When We're Gone (Le Monde après nous). In 2023 he released Retour à Normétal, a sound documentary about the Quebec mining town of Normétal. In 2024, he published La Chasse Interdite, a book and sound documentary following a hunting expedition in the Innu community of Pakua Shipi on the Basse-Côte-Nord. The project takes the form of an art book, a photo report and a sound documentary.

In 2025 he released The Punk of Natashquan (Le Punk de Natashquan), which was a Prix Iris nominee for Best Short Documentary at the 27th Quebec Cinema Awards.
