= Job, Joris & Marieke =

Animation Studio

Job, Joris & Marieke is a Dutch animation studio founded by Job Roggeveen (1979), Joris Oprins (1980) and Marieke Blaauw (1979).

== History ==
They met during their studies at the Design Academy Eindhoven. Joris and Job graduated in 2003 and Marieke in 2002. From 2004 to 2005 Joris and Marieke worked as animators on the stop motion series Miffy at the animation studio Pedri in Ankeveen. In 2007 they founded their studio in Utrecht. They work on commissioned work, music videos and animated short films.

The music for all their films is being composed by Job who is also a musician. In 2010, Job started the music project Happy Camper for which he won an Edison Award. Job, Joris & Marieke worked on the artwork and the music videos for both of the studio albums Happy Camper released.

In 2011, Job, Joris & Marieke created the music video for the song Ik Neem Je Mee by Dutch rapper Gers Pardoel. Over 19 million people watched the music video on YouTube.

In 2012, Dutch broadcaster KRO aired the children series The Tumblies. Job, Joris & Marieke worked on the concept, the character design and the music.

In 2013, they released their animated short film MUTE. MUTE won, among others, the Grand Prix and the audience award at the Holland Animatie Film Festival in 2013.

As part of Ultrakort, Job, Joris & Marieke created the animated short film A Single Life in 2014. The film was screened in front of the Dutch box office hit Gooische Vrouwen 2 in all Pathé cinemas. In 2015, the film was nominated for an Academy Awards for Best Animated Short Film, and for the Cartoon d'Or. Also the film won over 15 international awards.

In 2014, the City of Utrecht commissioned Job, Joris & Marieke to make the short film/music video Bon Voyage! This film was to promote the start of the Tour de France in Utrecht in 2015. The title song Bon Voyage! was composed by Dutch singer songwriter Blaudzun

In 2015, they made the animated short film (Otto) as part of NTR KORT!. The film had its international premiere at the Toronto International Film Festival. (Otto) was chosen to be the official Dutch entry for the Academy® Award Best Animated Short Film 2016. ALCINE kids premiere at the Alcalá de Henares Film Festival in 2016.

In 2016, studio Job, Joris & Marieke released their short film Kop Op (Heads Together), in co-production with Viking Film and Dutch broadcaster VPRO, which won the Grand Prix Short at the New York International Children's Film Festival. They also released their first children's book Wie Doet Dat Toch? together with publisher Kluitman.

In 2018, they released the children's book De Happy Camper, Manfreds Kampeer & Survivalgids, also together with publisher Kluitman. And they released their animated short film A Double Life, which was nominated for a Gouden Kalf at the Netherlands Film Festival in 2018.

In 2019, their short film Kop Op (Heads Together) won the International Emmy Kids Award in the category: Animation.

In 2022, they made children series SWOP (Kop Op) together with Viking Film and the Dutch broadcaster VPRO. The main characters were voiced by the actors Nasrdin Dchar, Paulien Cornelisse and Steye van Dam. SWOP has 12 episodes of each ten minutes. SWOP was nominated for a Cinekid Award in the category Best Dutch Fiction Series. On 26 February 2022, they opened their exposition A Triple Life in the Kunsthal Rotterdam. At this exposition they showed a collection of their work and a video map installation called Nobody especially made for this exposition.

In 2024 their satirical short climate-film Quota (Quotum) premiered at Toronto International Filmfestival (TIFF), where it received an honorable mention from the Best International Short Film jury.

Animated Short Films

- 2003: Wad
- 2003: How Snjezhi Tjelovek Found His Ancestors
- 2005: Niet te Geloven
- 2006: Moi
- 2008: It's not funny, it's art!
- 2013: MUTE
- 2014: A Single Life
- 2015: (Otto)
- 2016: Kop Op (Heads Together)
- 2018: A Double Life
- 2022: Nobody
- 2024: Quota (Quotum)

== Music videos ==
- 2010: Happy Camper - Born With A Bothered Mind
- 2011: Gers Pardoel - Ik Neem Je Mee
- 2013: Fit - Duurt Te Lang
- 2014: Happy Camper - The Daily Drumbeat
- 2014: RICO & A.R.T. - Naaktslak
- 2014: RICO & A.R.T. - Zombie
- 2014: RICO & A.R.T. - Opa
- 2014: Blaudzun - Bon Voyage!
- 2015: Fedde Le Grand - Robotic
- 2019: Kinderen Voor Kinderen - Reis Mee!

== Books ==
- 2016: Wie Doet Dat Toch? (Who Did That?)
- 2018: De Happy Camper, Manfreds Kampeer & Survivalgids
