= 2024 Festival du nouveau cinéma =

Film festival in Montreal, Canada

- Opening film: Universal Language (Une langue universelle) by Matthew Rankin
- Closing film: Misericordia (Miséricorde) by Alain Guiraudie
- Location: Montreal, Quebec, Canada
- Founded: 1971
- Festival date: October 9-20, 2024
- Website: nouveaucinema.ca/en

Festival du nouveau cinéma
- 2025 2023

The 2024 edition of the Festival du nouveau cinéma, the 53rd edition in the event's history, took place from October 9 to 20, 2024 in Montreal, Quebec, Canada.

The festival's opening film was Universal Language (Une langue universelle) by Matthew Rankin, and it closed with Misericordia (Miséricorde) by Alain Guiraudie.

Overall, the festival screened over 200 feature and short films.

== Awards ==
The winners of the short film awards were announced on October 16, with the winners of feature film awards announced on October 20 at the festival's conclusion.

Award	Film	Filmmaker
National Competition, Grand Prize	Measures for a Funeral	Sofia Bohdanowicz
National Competition, Prix de la diffusion Québécor	Lázaro at Night (Lázaro de noche)	Nicolás Pereda
National Competition, Prix de la diffusion Québécor Honorable Mention	There, There	Heather Young
International Competition, Grand Prize	Toxic (Akiplėša)	Saulė Bliuvaitė
International Competition, Daniel Langlois Innovation Award	I'm Not Everything I Want to Be (Jeste nejsem, kým chci být)	Klára Tasovská
International Competition, Best Performance	Simon of the Mountain (Simon de la montaña)	Lorenzo Ferre
New Alchemists Prize	The Hyperboreans (Los hiperbóreos)	Cristobal León, Joaquín Cociña
New Alchemists Prize, Honorable Mention	Barrunto	Emilia Beatriz
Prix Temps 0	Life's a Bitch (Chiennes de vies)	Xavier Seron
Prix Temps 0, Honorable Mention	We Are Aliens (みーんな、宇宙人)	Kenichi Ugana
Audience Award, Temps 0	The Gesuidouz (ザ·ゲスイドウズ)	Kenichi Ugana
FIPRESCI International Critics' Award	Cu Li Never Cries (Cu Li Không Bao Gio Khóc)	Phạm Ngọc Lân
Prix Fierté Montréal	I'm Not Everything I Want to Be (Jeste nejsem, kým chci být)	Klára Tasovská
Audience Award, Panorama International	Flow (Straume)	Gints Zilbalodis
TV5 Audience Award	Ghosts of the Sea (Les Enfants du large)	Virginia Tangvald
National Competition, Short Film	perfectly a strangeness	Alison McAlpine
National Competition, Short Film Honorable Mention	Sleep Talking	Ethan Godel
National Competition, Short Film Public Prize	Gender Reveal	Mo Matton
International Competition, Short Film	Vox Humana	Don Josephus Raphael Eblahan
International Competition, Short Film Honorable Mention	The Colloquy of Dogs (Le Colloque des chiens)	Norman Nedellec
New Alchemists, Animated Short Film	Sans voix	Samuel Patthey
New Alchemists, National Dada Prize	Samaa	Ehsan Gharib
New Alchemists, International Dada Prize	Grandmamauntsistercat	Zuza Banasińska
RPCÉ Grand Prize	Pan & Syrinx	a. laurel lawrence
RPCÉ Grand Prize Honorable Mention	Voies de passage	Geneviève Tremblay, Milla Cummings
RPCÉ Coup de coeur Vidéographe	L'Eau coule sans demander pardon	Marie-Frédérique Lemieux
RPCÉ Coup de coeur Vidéographe Honorable Mention	Hogar	Olly Norambuena

== Official selections ==
=== International Competition ===
English title	Original title	Director(s)	Production country
Cu Li Never Cries	Cu Li Không Bao Gio Khóc	Phạm Ngọc Lân	Vietnam, Singapore, France, Philippines, Norway
Formosa Beach	Praia Formosa	Julia De Simone	Brazil, Portugal
I'm Not Everything I Want to Be	Jeste nejsem, kým chci být	Klára Tasovská	Czech Republic, Slovakia, Austria
On Becoming a Guinea Fowl		Rungano Nyoni	Zambia, United Kingdom, Ireland
Pepe		Nelson Carlo de los Santos Arias	Dominican Republic, Germany, France, Namibia
Simon of the Mountain	Simon de la montaña	Federico Luis	Argentina, Chile, Uruguay
Toxic	Akiplėša	Saulė Bliuvaitė	Lithuania
Viet and Nam	Trong lòng đất	Minh Quý Trương	Philippines, Singapore, France, Netherlands, Italy, Germany, Vietnam
Who Do I Belong To	Mé el Aïn	Meryam Joobeur	Tunisia, France, Canada, Norway, Qatar, Saudi Arabia

=== National Competition ===
English title	Original title	Director(s)	Production country
Alberta Number One		Alexander Carson	Canada
Cherub		Devin Shears	Canada
Ghosts of the Sea	Les Enfants du large	Virginia Tangvald	Canada, France
Inedia		Liz Cairns	Canada
Lázaro at Night	Lázaro de noche	Nicolás Pereda	Canada, Mexico
Matt and Mara		Kazik Radwanski	Canada
Measures for a Funeral		Sofia Bohdanowicz	Canada
There, There		Heather Young	Canada
You Are Not Alone	Vous n'êtes pas seuls	Marie-Hélène Viens, Philippe Lupien	Canada

=== International Panorama ===
English title	Original title	Director(s)	Production country
All the Long Nights	Yoake no subete	Shô Miyake	Japan
bluish		Lilith Kraxner, Milena Czernovsky	Austria
Disco's Revenge		Omar Majeed, Peter Mishara	Canada
Favoriten		Ruth Beckermann	Austria
Flow	Straume	Gints Zilbalodis	Latvia, France, Belgium
A History of Love and War	Una historia de amor y guerra	Santiago Mohar Volkow	Mexico
I Saw Three Black Lights	Yo vi tres luces negras	Santiago Lozano Álvarez	Colombia, Mexico, France, Germany
Kalak		Isabella Eklöf	Denmark, Netherlands, Sweden, Finland, Greenland
Kyuka: Before Summer's End		Kostis Charamountanis	Greece, North Macedonia
Most People Die on Sundays	Los domingos mueren más personas	Iair Said	Argentina, Italy, Spain
Patient No. 1	Пациент №1	Rezo Gigineishvili	Georgia
Realm of Satan		Scott Cummings	United States
Shambhala		Min Bahadur Bham	Nepal, France, Norway, Turkey, Hong Kong, Taiwan, United States, Qatar
Skin in Spring	La Piel en primavera	Yennifer Uribe Alzate	Colombia, Chile
Tendaberry		Haley Elizabeth Anderson	United States
To a Land Unknown		Mahdi Fleifel	United Kingdom, France, Germany, Netherlands, Greece, Qatar, Saudi Arabia, Palestine

=== The New Alchemists (Les Nouveaux alchimistes) ===
English title	Original title	Director(s)	Production country
Barrunto		Emilia Beatriz	United Kingdom, Puerto Rico
Bogancloch		Ben Rivers	United Kingdom, Germany, Iceland
Do You Want to See Part Two?		cricri sora ren	Germany, Russia, China
Eat the Night		Caroline Poggi, Jonathan Vinel	France
The Human Hibernation		Anna Cornudella Castro	Spain
The Hyperboreans	Los hiperbóreos	Cristobal León, Joaquín Cociña	Chile
Reas		Lola Arias	Argentina, Germany, Switzerland
Space Down		Dominic Gagnon	Canada
Tale of Shepherds	Historia de pastores	Jaime Puertas Castillo	Spain
Through the Graves the Wind Is Blowing		Travis Wilkerson	United States

=== The Essentials (Les Incontournables) ===
English title	Original title	Director(s)	Production country
Afternoons of Solitude	Tardes de soledad	Albert Serra	Spain, France, Portugal
All We Imagine as Light		Payal Kapadia	France, India, Netherlands, Luxembourg
Anora		Sean Baker	United States
The Apprentice		Ali Abbasi	Canada, Denmark, Ireland, United States
Bird		Andrea Arnold	United Kingdom
By the Stream	수유천	Hong Sang-soo	South Korea
Caught by the Tides	风流一代	Jia Zhangke	China
Dragon Dilatation		Bertrand Mandico	France
Emilia Pérez		Jacques Audiard	France
Ernest Cole: Lost and Found		Raoul Peck	France
A Family	Une famille	Christine Angot	France
The Girl with the Needle	Pigen med nålen	Magnus von Horn	Denmark, Poland, Sweden
Grand Tour		Miguel Gomes	Portugal, Italy, France, Germany, Japan, China
The Invasion	L'Invasion	Sergei Loznitsa	Netherlands, France, United States
Motel Destino		Karim Aïnouz	Brazil, France, Germany
Oh, Canada		Paul Schrader	
Rumours		Guy Maddin, Evan Johnson, Galen Johnson	Canada, Germany
The Seed of the Sacred Fig		Mohammad Rasoulof	Iran, France, Germany
A Traveler's Needs	여행자의 필요	Hong Sang-soo	South Korea
The Visitor		Bruce LaBruce	United Kingdom

=== Temps 0 ===
English title	Original title	Director(s)	Production country
Animal	Animale	Emma Benestan	Belgium, France, Saudi Arabia
Being Blanche Houellebecq	Dans la peau de Blanche Houellebecq	Guillaume Nicloux	France
The Box Man	箱男	Gakuryū Ishii	Japan
Comme dans un vrai film		Zoé Rivemale	France
The Crazy Family	Gyaku-funsha Kazoku	Gakuryū Ishii	Japan
Else		Thibault Emin	France, Belgium
The Gesuidouz	ザ·ゲスイドウズ	Kenichi Ugana	Japan
Life's a Bitch	Chiennes de vies	Xavier Seron	Belgium
One-Way Ticket to the Other Side		Douglas Buck, Jen Gatien, Edgar Pêra, Buddy Giovinazzo, Martina Schöne-Radunski, David Gregory, Truman Kewley, Patrycja Planik, Guillaume Campanacci, Katsuki Kuroyanagi, Jerome Vandewattyne	Belgium, Germany
Peaches Goes Bananas		Marie Losier	France
Peau de cochon		Philippe Katerine	France
Plastic Guns	Les pistolets en plastique	Jean-Christophe Meurisse	France
The Real Superstar		Cédric Dupire	France
Sam & Lola	Sam et Lola	Mahaut Adam	France
Schirkoa: In Lies We Trust		Ishan Shukla	India, France, Germany
School of the Holy Beast	Seijū gakuen	Norifumi Suzuki	Japan
The Second Act	Le deuxième acte	Quentin Dupieux	France
Striptease intégral		Jean Libon, Clémentine Bisiaux, Régine Dubois, Stéphanie De Smedt, Mathilde Blanc, Yves Hinant	France, Belgium
We Are Aliens	みーんな、宇宙人。	Kenichi Ugana	Japan

=== Special Presentations ===
English title	Original title	Director(s)	Production country
Days of Happiness	Les jours heureux	Chloé Robichaud	Canada
Jaws		Steven Spielberg	United States
Jaws 2		Jeannot Szwarc	United States
Jaws 3		Joe Alves	United States
Jaws: The Revenge		Joseph Sargent	United States
Tampopo	タンポポ	Juzo Itami	Japan
Vibrant	Vivant	Yann Arthus-Bertrand	France
When Adam Changes	Adam change lentement	Joël Vaudreuil	Canada

=== History of Cinema (Histoire(s) du cinéma) ===
English title	Original title	Director(s)	Production country
Bona		Lino Brocka	Philippines
Eight Postcards from Utopia	Opt ilustrate din lumea ideală	Radu Jude	Romania
Eldorado		Charles Binamé	Canada
Holy Motors		Leos Carax	France
It's Not Me	C'est pas moi	Leos Carax	France
Orders	Les Ordres	Michel Brault	Canada
Paris, Texas		Wim Wenders	Germany, France
Sleep #2		Radu Jude	Romania

=== International Competition for Short Films ===
English title	Original title	Director(s)	Production country
102 Narra		Rafael Manuel, Tatjana Fanny	Netherlands
Across the Waters		Viv Li	France
At That Very Moment	En el mismísimo momento	Rita Pauls, Federico Luis	Argentina, Germany
Bad for a Moment	Mau por um momento	Daniel Soares	Portugal
The Colloquy of Dogs	Le Colloque des chiens	Norman Nedellec	France
Days Before the Death of Nicky	Jours avant la mort de Nicky	Denis Côté	Canada
The Distance Between Us	Qu'importe la distance	Léo Fontaine	France
Fragments of Summer		Youmin Kang, Soomin Kang	South Korea
Leela		Tanmay Chowdhary	India
looking she said I forget		Naomi Pacifique	Netherlands, Switzerland
The Man Who Could Not Remain Silent	Čovjek koji nije mogao šutjeti	Nebojša Slijepčević	Croatia, France, Bulgaria, Slovenia
Masterpiece Mommy		Dorothy Sing Zhang	United Kingdom, China
The Moon Also Rises		Wang Yuyan	France
The Moving Garden	O Jardim em Movimento	Inês Lima	Portugal
My Senses Are All I Have to Offer	As minhas sensações são tudo o que tenho para oferecer	Isadora Neves Marques	Portugal
The Nature of Dogs		Pom Bunsermvicha	Thailand, United States, Singapore, Hong Kong
Panadrilo		Marcela Heilbron	Panama
Le reste n'a pas d'importance		Romain Dumont	France
A Son and a Father	1 Hijo & 1 padre	Andrés Ramírez Pulido	Colombia, France
That's How I Love You	Tako Te Volim	Mário Macedo	Croatia, Portugal
Vox Humana		Don Josephus Raphael Eblahan	Philippines, Singapore, United States

=== National Competition for Short Films ===
English title	Original title	Director(s)	Country
Before They Joined Us		Arshile Khanjian Egoyan	Canada
A Day Apart on the Seventeenth		Noel Pendawas	Canada
Fantas		Halima Elkhatabi	Canada
Gender Reveal		Mo Matton	Canada
Himalia		Juliette Lossky, Clara Milo	Canada
His Smell		Kalil Haddad	Canada
Julian and the Wind		Connor Jessup	Canada
The Lame Shall Sing		Kit Baronas	Canada
Mercenaire		Pier-Philippe Chevigny	Canada
A Night of Cambodian Opera	Nuit d'opéra cambodgien	Xu-Ming Lor	Canada
On a Sunday at Eleven		Alicia K. Harris	Canada
One Day This Kid		Alexander Farah	Canada
perfectly a strangeness		Alison McAlpine	Canada
Place d'Armes		Drew Lint	Canada
The Sculptor: Birth of the Patavision		Joshua Banman	Canada
Serve the Country		Fabian Velasco, Milos Mitrovic	Canada
Sleep Talking		Ethan Godel	Canada
Two of Hearts		Mashie Alam	Canada
Uncle from Yugoslavia	L'Oncle de Yugoslavie	Jérémy Gagnon	Canada
Whispering in the Leaves		Luvleen Hunjan	Canada
Who Loves the Sun		Arshia Shakiba	Canada

=== Special Presentations Short Films ===
Short films from Wapikoni Mobile, a film training organization for emerging indigenous filmmakers in Quebec, in celebration of the organization's 20th anniversary.

English title	Original title	Director(s)	Country
Among the Forest		Oqim Nicholas	Canada
Batailles		Karen Pinette Fontaine	Canada
Démo Wapikoni		Louis Fontaine	Canada
I Created Memories	Je crée des souvenirs	Sammy Gadbois	Canada
Innu-assit		Jonathan Grégoire	Canada
Inuktitut Dialects in the 21st Century		Ulivia Uviluk	Canada
It's Me, Landon	C'est moi, Landon	Landon Moise	Canada
Life on the Move		Jack Belhumeur	Canada
Neka		Nemnemiss McKenzie	Canada
Nin Kamashitshet		André-Charles Ishpatao	Canada
We Are Not Speaking the Same Language		Danika St-Laurent	Canada

=== The New Alchemists, Short Films ===
English title	Original title	Director(s)	Production country
A Black Screen Too		Rhayne Vermette	Canada
Adrift Potentials	Potenciais à deriva	Leonardo Pirondi	Brazil, United States
Dérailler		Marielle Dalpé	Canada
Dreams About Putin		Nastia Korkia, Vlad Fishez	Belgium
Dull Spots of Greenish Colours		Sasha Svirsky	Germany
The Eggregores' Theory		Andrea Gatopoulos	Italy
The Exploding Girl	La Fille qui explose	Caroline Poggi, Jonathan Vinel	France
for here I am sitting in a tin can far above the world		Gala Hernández López	France
Fort Garry Lions Pool		Ryan Steel	Canada
Go Between		Chris Kennedy	Canada
Grandmamauntsistercat		Zuza Banasińska	Netherlands, Poland
The Great Thaw		Michaela Grill, Karl Lemieux	Canada, Austria
Look on the Bright Side		Wang Yuyan	France, Italy
The Masked Monster	괴인의 정체	Syeyoung Park	South Korea
Le Mirage des mains ultra réalistes		Guillaume Vallée	Canada
Nemo 1		Albéric Aurtenèche	Canada
The Oasis I Deserve		Inès Sieulle	France
Positive Transparencies		Marianne Thodas	Canada
Renaissance Printanière à la source du Pêcher		Emma Roufs	Canada
Revolving Rounds		Johann Lurf, Christina Jauernik	Austria
Rituals Under a Scarlet Sky	Rituels sous un ciel écarlate	Samer Najari, Dominique Chila	Canada
Samaa		Ehsan Gharib	Canada
Sans voix		Samuel Patthey	Switzerland
Someplace in Your Mouth		Beatrice Gibson, Nick Gordon	Italy, United Kingdom
The Sunset Special 2		Nicolas Gebbe	Germany
Transit		Sebastian Freudenschuss	Austria
Volcelest		Éric Briche	France
Wind		Mike Hoolboom	Canada
The Wolf	Le Loup	Theodore Ushev	Canada

=== RPCÉ Student Short Film Competition ===
English title	Original title	Director(s)	Province/Country
À la dure		Daniel Cyr	Quebec
After Blue		Dag Davidge	British Columbia
Amanite tueuse d'Éclipse		Hugo Lamarre, Laurence Patenaude, Jérémy Burelle	Quebec
Antipersonnelle		Léonie Savard	Quebec
Aquaphobe		Élio Matias, Maëlle Sallée	Quebec
Au bord des limbes		Maxime Mompérousse	Quebec
Au-delà du regard		Arianna Bardesono	Quebec
Broken Reflections		Jason Swallow	Quebec
Donne-moi du love		Noah Zinck, Elizabeth Daigneault, Fabrice Leclerc	Quebec
L'Eau coule sans demander pardon		Marie-Frédérique Lemieux	Quebec
Écrire, vivre, déneiger		Laetitia Clareton	Quebec
Face cachée		Nicolas Lecavalier	Quebec
Un goût amer		Daniel Cyr	Quebec
Le Gun		Louis Mercier	Quebec
He's Not That Special		Nickiesha Flemmings	Quebec
Hogar		Olly Norambuena	Quebec
Iris		Bianca Delmar, Alyana Jandumon, Gladys Lou	Ontario
Juste des robots		Maxime Mompérousse	Quebec
Marée noire		Anthony Bouchard, Mélodie Poulin	Quebec
Marie et moi		Diane Premi	Quebec
Mes larmes sont vides		Philippe Scrive	Quebec
Mirage		Jules Brulay	Quebec
Mise à nu		Chloé Dauchez	Quebec
Monsieur de Garie		Laura Marroquin-Éthier	Quebec
Mother and Son	Con dại cái mang	Thu Uyen Dao	Vietnam
Our Time Together		Emiliano Aguayo	Alberta
Pan & Syrinx		a. laurel lawrence	Nova Scotia
Parenthèse		Ludivine Smeets	Quebec
Retrace	Một cõi đi về	Thi Ha Trang Tran	Vietnam
Terrarium		Miguel Morin	Quebec
Three Seasons	三季	Yuhan Yang	British Columbia
Tourterelle triste		Zachary Roberge	Quebec
Turn the Other Cheek You Little Shit		Tristan Ramos	British Columbia
Vérité augmentée		Édouard Lamarre	Quebec
Voies de passage		Geneviève Tremblay, Milla Cummings	Quebec
Wooden Fish Guitar	Đàn Cá Gỗ	Dat Nguyen	Vietnam
Les Yeux la couleur de la mer		Yann Reynolds	Quebec

=== P'tits loups ===
Short film program of animation for children.

English title	Original title	Director(s)	Production country
Ana Morphose		João Rodrigues	Portugal
Bébert et l'omnibus		Yves Robert	France
Beurk!		Loïc Espuche	France
Carotte		Mathieu Labaye, Simon Médard	Belgium
Los Carpinchos		Alfredo Soderguit	France, Chile, Uruguay
Clawlolo (Gramophone)		Aleksey Alekseev	Cyprus
Criss Cross		Nina Rybárová, Tomáš Rybár	Slovakia, Czech Republic
Gilbert		Arturo Lacal, Alex Salu, Jordi Jiménez	Spain
Gina Kamentsky's Pinocchio in 70MM		Gina Kamentsky	United States
Le Grand party annuel des créatures de la lune		Francis Desharnais	Canada
Jardin le lutin		Zahya Tétreault Bélanger	Canada
Nube		Diego Alonso Sánchez de la Barquera Estrada, Christian Arredondo Narvaez	France, Hungary, Mexico
Out for Ice Cream	Crème à glace	Rachel Samson	Canada
The Swineherd		Magnus Igland Møller, Peter Smith	Denmark
Tête en l'air		Rémi Durin	France, Belgium
Weeds		Pola Kazak	Czech Republic

=== Estival ===
The festival's separate summer program of free public screenings of older films.

English title	Original title	Director(s)	Production country
The Animal Kingdom	Le règne animal	Thomas Cailley	France
Dune: Part Two		Denis Villeneuve	United States
Fallen Leaves	Kuolleet lehdet	Aki Kaurismäki	Finland, Germany
Humanist Vampire Seeking Consenting Suicidal Person	Vampire humaniste cherche suicidaire consentant	Ariane Louis-Seize	Canada
