= Marieke Blaauw =

Dutch animator (born 1979)

Marieke Blaauw (born 1979, in Hilversum) is a Dutch animator.

== Life ==
Blaauw was born in 1979 in Hilversum. She studied at the Design Academy Eindhoven in the Netherlands. She graduated in 2002. In 2005 she worked as an animator on the stop motion children series Miffy at studio Pedri in Ankeveen. In 2007 she co-founded animation studio Job, Joris & Marieke together with Job Roggeveen and Joris Oprins. Job, Joris & Marieke works on commissioned work, music videos and short animated films.

In 2013 they released their animated short film MUTE. MUTE won, among others, the Grand Prix and the audience award at the Holland Animatie Film Festival in 2013.

In 2014 the City of Utrecht commissioned Job, Joris & Marieke to make the short film/music video Bon Voyage! This film was to promote the start of the Tour de France in Utrecht in 2015. The title song Bon Voyage! was composed by Dutch singer songwriter Blaudzun

In 2015 their short animation film A Single Life was nominated for the Academy Award for best animated short film. The film was also nominated for the Cartoon d’Or and has won 15 international prizes.

In 2015 they made the short animation film (Otto). (Otto) is the official Dutch entry for the Academy Award for best animated short film. The film had its international premiere at the 2015 Toronto International Film Festival.

Their 2024 film Quota (Quotum) premiered at the 2024 Toronto International Film Festival, where it received an honorable mention for the Best International Short Film award.
