= 2024 Toronto International Film Festival =

49th edition of Canadian film festival

- Festival poster
- Opening film: Nutcrackers by David Gordon Green
- Closing film: The Deb by Rebel Wilson
- Location: Toronto, Ontario, Canada
- Founded: 1976
- Awards: The Life of Chuck (People's Choice Award)
- Festival date: September 5–15, 2024
- Website: tiff.net

Toronto International Film Festival
- 2025 2023

The 49th annual Toronto International Film Festival was held from September 5–15, 2024.

The festival opened with David Gordon Green's film Nutcrackers, and closed with Rebel Wilson's directorial debut film The Deb.

== Key programming announcements ==
The first programming announcements were released on June 18, 2024. A second batch of films was announced on July 9, and the opening and closing galas were announced on July 16. Full program announcements began on July 22, with the gala and special presentations lineups announced that day and several other programs announced over the course of that week. The full festival schedule, including numerous late additions, was announced on August 13. In addition to new and current films, the schedule included anniversary special event screenings of Damien Chazelle's Whiplash and Mina Shum's Double Happiness.

Nutcrackers marked the first time that an acquisitions title not already attached to a commercial distributor opened the festival since Creation launched the 2009 edition. Barry Hertz of The Globe and Mail linked this choice to the festival's announcement earlier in the year that it plans to launch a full film market in 2026, suggesting that it signaled an effort by the festival to play an active role in helping the film to secure a distribution deal and thus demonstrate the business case for the market project.

The choice of The Deb as closing film was effectively leaked a few days earlier than the official announcement, when Wilson posted a video to her Instagram account to accuse the film's producers of having tried to block the film's premiere at TIFF.

== Awards ==
=== Tribute Awards ===
The TIFF Tribute Awards recipients included David Cronenberg as recipient of the Norman Jewison Award, and Amy Adams as a recipient of the performer award. Actor Jharrel Jerome was also honoured in the performance category, and actress Zhao Tao received a special tribute award.

Cate Blanchett was the recipient of the Share Her Journey Groundbreaker Award for women who have made a positive difference in the film industry. Angelina Jolie was the recipient of the Jeff Skoll Award in Impact Media.

Mike Leigh received the Director Award, Camille Dalmais and Clément Ducol received the Variety Artisan Award, and Durga Chew-Bose received the Emerging Talent Award.

=== Regular awards ===
Awards for films, including the People's Choice Award, were announced at the conclusion of the festival. The awards program included a return of the Best Canadian Discovery Award, previously presented by the festival as "Best Canadian First Feature" until being discontinued after the 2019 Toronto International Film Festival.

| Award | Film | Director |
|---|---|---|
| People's Choice Award | The Life of Chuck | Mike Flanagan |
| People's Choice Award, First Runner Up | Emilia Pérez | Jacques Audiard |
| People's Choice Award, Second Runner Up | Anora | Sean Baker |
| People's Choice Award: Documentaries | The Tragically Hip: No Dress Rehearsal | Mike Downie |
| Documentary, First Runner Up | Will & Harper | Josh Greenbaum |
| Documentary, Second Runner Up | Your Tomorrow | Ali Weinstein |
| People's Choice Award: Midnight Madness | The Substance | Coralie Fargeat |
| Midnight Madness, First Runner Up | Dead Talents Society (鬼才之道) | John Hsu |
| Midnight Madness, Second Runner Up | Friendship | Andrew DeYoung |
| Platform Prize | They Will Be Dust (Polvo serán) | Carlos Marqués-Marcet |
| Platform Prize, Honorable Mention | Daughter's Daughter (女兒的女兒) | Sylvia Chang (performance) |
| Best Canadian Feature Film | Shepherds (Berger) | Sophie Deraspe |
| Best Canadian Discovery | Universal Language (Une langue universelle) | Matthew Rankin |
| Best Canadian Discovery, Honorable Mention | You Are Not Alone (Vous n'êtes pas seuls) | Marie-Hélène Viens, Philippe Lupien |
| Best Canadian Short Film | Are You Scared to Be Yourself Because You Think That You Might Fail? | Bec Pecaut |
| Best International Short Film | Deck 5B (Däck 5B) | Malin Ingrid Johansson |
| Best International Short Film, Honorable Mention | Quota (Quotum) | Job Roggeveen, Joris Oprins, Marieke Blaauw |
| FIPRESCI Award | Mother Mother | K'naan Warsame |
| NETPAC Award | The Last of the Sea Women | Sue Kim |

=== Award juries ===
- Platform: Atom Egoyan, Hur Jin-ho, Jane Schoenbrun
- Best Canadian Feature Film and Best Canadian Discovery: Estrella Araiza, Chelsea McMullan, Randall Okita
- Short Cuts: Luis De Filippis, Micah Kernan, Shane Smith
- NETPAC: Hannah Fisher, Vilsoni Hereniko, Kerri Sakamoto
- FIPRESCI: Li Cheuk-to, Pierre-Simon Gutman, Azadeh Jafari, Saffron Maeve, Wilfred Okiche

== Events ==
In Conversation with... events were held featuring Cate Blanchett, Zoe Saldaña, Steven Soderbergh, and Hyun Bin and Lee Dong-wook.

== Programme ==
=== Galas ===
The following films were selected to the Gala Presentations section:

| English title | Original title | Director(s) | Production country |
|---|---|---|---|
| Andrea Bocelli: Because I Believe | | Cosima Spender | United Kingdom |
| Better Man | | Michael Gracey | Australia |
| The Deb | | Rebel Wilson | Australia |
| Don't Let's Go to the Dogs Tonight | | Embeth Davidtz | South Africa |
| Eden | | Ron Howard | United States |
| Elton John: Never Too Late | | R.J. Cutler, David Furnish | United States, United Kingdom |
| The Friend | | Scott McGehee, David Siegel | United States |
| Harbin | 하얼빈 | Woo Min-ho | South Korea |
| Meet the Barbarians | Les barbares | Julie Delpy | France |
| Megalopolis | | Francis Ford Coppola | United States |
| Nutcrackers | | David Gordon Green | United States |
| Oh, Canada | | Paul Schrader | United States |
| The Penguin Lessons | | Peter Cattaneo | Spain, United Kingdom |
| The Return | | Uberto Pasolini | Italy, United Kingdom |
| Road Diary: Bruce Springsteen and The E Street Band | | Thom Zimny | United States |
| The Shrouds | | David Cronenberg | Canada, France |
| Superboys of Malegaon | | Reema Kagti | India |
| Takin' Care of Business | | Tyler Measom | Canada, United States |
| Unstoppable | | William Goldenberg | United States |
| Will & Harper | | Josh Greenbaum | United States |
| The Wild Robot | | Chris Sanders | United States |
| William Tell | | Nick Hamm | Italy, United Kingdom |

=== Special Presentations ===
The following films were selected to the Special Presentations section:

| English title | Original title | Director(s) | Production country |
|---|---|---|---|
| 40 Acres | | R. T. Thorne | Canada |
| All of You | | William Bridges | United States |
| All We Imagine as Light | | Payal Kapadia | France, India, Netherlands, Luxembourg |
| Anora | | Sean Baker | United States |
| The Assessment | | Fleur Fortuné | United Kingdom, Germany, United States |
| Babygirl | | Halina Reijn | United States |
| Bird | | Andrea Arnold | United Kingdom |
| Bring Them Down | | Christopher Andrews | Ireland, Belgium |
| The Brutalist | | Brady Corbet | United States, United Kingdom, Hungary |
| Can I Get a Witness? | | Ann Marie Fleming | Canada |
| Carnival Is Over | Os Enforcados | Fernando Coimbra | Brazil, Portugal |
| Caught by the Tides | 风流一代 | Jia Zhangke | China |
| Conclave | | Edward Berger | United States, United Kingdom |
| The Cut | | Sean Ellis | United Kingdom |
| Dahomey | | Mati Diop | France, Senegal, Benin |
| Emilia Pérez | | Jacques Audiard | France |
| The End | | Joshua Oppenheimer | Denmark, United Kingdom |
| The Fire Inside | | Rachel Morrison | United States |
| The Girl with the Needle | Pigen med nålen | Magnus von Horn | Denmark, Poland, Sweden |
| Hard Truths | | Mike Leigh | United Kingdom, Spain |
| Harvest | | Athina Rachel Tsangari | United Kingdom |
| Heretic | | Scott Beck and Bryan Woods | United States |
| Hold Your Breath | | Karrie Crouse, Will Joines | United States |
| I'm Still Here | Ainda Estou Aqui | Walter Salles | Brazil, France |
| I, the Executioner | 베테랑2 | Ryoo Seung-wan | South Korea |
| K-Pops! | | Anderson .Paak | United States |
| The Last Showgirl | | Gia Coppola | United States |
| The Life of Chuck | | Mike Flanagan | United States |
| Love in the Big City | 대도시의 사랑법 | E.oni | South Korea |
| The Luckiest Man in America | | Samir Oliveros | United States |
| Millers in Marriage | | Edward Burns | United States |
| Misericordia | Miséricorde | Alain Guiraudie | France, Spain, Portugal |
| Nightbitch | | Marielle Heller | United States |
| On Becoming a Guinea Fowl | | Rungano Nyoni | Zambia, United Kingdom, Ireland |
| On Swift Horses | | Daniel Minahan | United States |
| The Order | | Justin Kurzel | Canada, United States |
| Paul Anka: His Way | | John Maggio | United States |
| The Piano Lesson | | Malcolm Washington | United States |
| Piece by Piece | | Morgan Neville | United States |
| Queer | | Luca Guadagnino | Italy, United States |
| Quisling: The Final Days | Quislings siste dager | Erik Poppe | Norway |
| Relay | | David Mackenzie | United States |
| Rez Ball | | Sydney Freeland | United States |
| Riff Raff | | Dito Montiel | United States |
| The Room Next Door | | Pedro Almodóvar | Spain |
| Rumours | | Guy Maddin, Evan Johnson, Galen Johnson | Canada, Germany |
| The Salt Path | | Marianne Elliott | United Kingdom |
| Saturday Night | | Jason Reitman | United States |
| Sharp Corner | | Jason Buxton | Canada, Ireland |
| Shell | | Max Minghella | United States |
| Shepherds | Berger | Sophie Deraspe | Canada |
| Sketch | | Seth Worley | United States |
| Vermiglio | | Maura Delpero | Italy, France, Belgium |
| We Live in Time | | John Crowley | France, United Kingdom |
| Went Up the Hill | | Samuel Van Grinsven | New Zealand, Australia |
| Without Blood | | Angelina Jolie | United States, Italy |
| Young Werther | | José Lourenço | Canada |

=== Special Events ===
| English title | Original title | Director(s) | Production country |
|---|---|---|---|
| Double Happiness | | Mina Shum | Canada |
| Dune | | Denis Villeneuve | United States |
| Dune: Part Two | | Denis Villeneuve | United States |
| Whiplash | | Damien Chazelle | United States |

=== Centrepiece ===
The Centrepiece program was announced on August 6.

| English title | Original title | Director(s) | Production country |
|---|---|---|---|
| Addition | | Marcelle Lunam | Australia |
| Anywhere Anytime | | Milad Tangshir | Italy |
| April | | Dea Kulumbegashvili | Italy, France, Georgia |
| Beloved Tropic | Querido trópico | Ana Endara | Panama, Colombia |
| Bliss | Hemda | Shemi Zarhin | Israel |
| Bound in Heaven | 捆绑上天堂 | Huo Xin | China |
| By the Stream | Suyucheon | Hong Sang-soo | South Korea |
| Cloud | クラウド | Kiyoshi Kurosawa | Japan |
| Crocodile Tears | Air Mata Buaya | Tumpal Tampubolon | Indonesia, France, Singapore, Germany |
| Don't Cry, Butterfly | Mưa trên cánh bướm | Dương Diệu Linh | Vietnam, Singapore, Philippines, Indonesia |
| Edge of Night | | Türker Süer | Germany |
| The Exiles | Los Tortuga | Belén Funes | Spain, Chile |
| Fanatical: The Catfishing of Tegan and Sara | | Erin Lee Carr | United States |
| Flow | Straume | Gints Zilbalodis | Latvia, France, Belgium |
| Front Row | | Merzak Allouache | Algeria, Saudi Arabia, France |
| Happyend | | Neo Sora | Japan, United States |
| Happy Holidays | | Scandar Copti | Palestine, Germany, France, Italy, Qatar |
| Jane Austen Wrecked My Life | Jane Austen a gâché ma vie | Laura Piani | France |
| Julie Keeps Quiet | | Leonardo van Dijl | Belgium, Sweden |
| Ka Whawhai Tonu - Struggle Without End | | Michael Jonathan | New Zealand |
| Kill the Jockey | El jockey | Luis Ortega | Argentina, Mexico, Spain, Denmark, United States |
| The Legend of the Vagabond Queen of Lagos | | Agbajowo Collective: James Tayler, Ogungbamila Temitope, Okechukwu Samuel, Mathew Cerf, Tina Edukpo, Bisola Akinmuyiwa, A.S. Elijah | Nigeria, Germany, South Africa, United States |
| Little Jaffna | | Lawrence Valin | France |
| Matt and Mara | | Kazik Radwanski | Canada |
| Measures for a Funeral | | Sofia Bohdanowicz | Canada |
| A Missing Part | Une part manquante | Guillaume Senez | Belgium, France |
| The Mother and the Bear | | Johnny Ma | Canada, Chile |
| The Mountain | | Rachel House | New Zealand |
| My Sunshine | Boku No Osihama | Hiroshi Okuyama | Japan, France |
| Pimpinero: Blood and Oil | | Andrés Baiz | Colombia |
| Presence | | Steven Soderbergh | United States |
| Santosh | | Sandhya Suri | United Kingdom |
| The Seed of the Sacred Fig | | Mohammad Rasoulof | Iran, France, Germany |
| Seven Days | | Ali Samadi Ahadi | Germany |
| Souleymane's Story | L'histoire de Souleymane | Boris Lojkine | France |
| Sunshine | | Antoinette Jadaone | Philippines |
| The Swedish Torpedo | Den svenska torpeden | Frida Kempff | Sweden |
| Sweet Angel Baby | | Melanie Oates | Canada |
| To a Land Unknown | | Mahdi Fleifel | United Kingdom, France, Germany, Netherlands, Greece, Qatar, Saudi Arabia, Palestine |
| Under the Volcano | Pod wulkanem | Damian Kocur | Poland |
| An Unfinished Film | 一部未完成的电影 | Lou Ye | Singapore, Germany |
| Universal Language | Une langue universelle | Matthew Rankin | Canada |
| The Village Next to Paradise | | Mo Harawe | France, Austria, Germany, Somalia |
| When the Light Breaks | Ljósbrot | Rúnar Rúnarsson | Iceland, Netherlands, Croatia, France |

=== TIFF Docs ===
Documentaries were announced on August 7. One late addition, Alexis Bloom's The Bibi Files, was added to the program just a few days before the festival opened.

The film Russians at War was pulled from the festival following protests accusing it of being Russian propaganda whitewashing the Russian invasion of Ukraine, a characterization which the film's producers and TIFF organizers denied. According to CEO Cameron Bailey, "In emails and phone calls, TIFF staff received hundreds of instances of verbal abuse. Our staff also received threats of violence, including threats of sexual violence." TIFF subsequently proceeded with a screening on September 17, outside of the festival dates.

| English title | Original title | Director(s) | Production country |
|---|---|---|---|
| The Bibi Files | | Alexis Bloom | United States |
| Blue Road: The Edna O'Brien Story | | Sinéad O’Shea | Ireland, United Kingdom |
| Ernest Cole: Lost and Found | | Raoul Peck | France |
| The Freedom of Fierro | La Libertad de Fierro | Santiago Esteinou | Mexico, Canada, Greece |
| From Ground Zero | | Wissam Moussa, Nidal Damo, Ahmed Hassouna, Alaa Ayoub, Karim Satoum, Bashar Al Babisi, Khamis Masharawi, Nida’A Abu Hasna, Tamer Nijim, Ahmed Al Danaf, Rima Mahmoud, Muhammad Al Sharif, Basil El Maqousi, Mustafa Al Nabih, Rabab Khamis, Mustafa Kulab, Alaa Damo, Hana Eleiwa, Mahdi Kreirah, Aws Al Banna, Islam Al Zeriei, Etimad Washah | Palestine, France, Qatar, Jordan |
| The Last of the Sea Women | | Sue Kim | United States |
| The Last Republican | | Steve Pink | United States |
| Living Together | Cohabiter | Halima Elkhatabi | Canada |
| Men of War | | Jen Gatien, Billy Corben | United States, Canada |
| Mistress Dispeller | | Elizabeth Lo | China, United States |
| No Other Land | | Yuval Abraham, Basel Adra, Hamdan Ballal, Rachel Szor | Palestine, Norway |
| Patrice: The Movie | | Ted Passon | United States |
| A Sisters' Tale | | Leila Amini | Switzerland, France, Iran |
| So Surreal: Behind the Masks | | Neil Diamond, Joanne Robertson | Canada |
| Space Cowboy | | Marah Strauch, Bryce Leavitt | United States |
| Sudan, Remember Us | Soudan, souviens-toi | Hind Meddeb | France, Tunisia, Qatar |
| Tata | | Lina Vdovîi, Radu Ciorniciuc | Romania, Germany, Netherlands |
| Temporary Shelter | Tímabundið Skjól | Anastasiia Bortuali | Iceland |
| Vice Is Broke | | Eddie Huang | United States |
| Wishing on a Star | | Peter Kerekes | Italy, Slovakia, Czech Republic, Austria, Croatia |
| Your Tomorrow | | Ali Weinstein | Canada |

=== Discovery ===
The Discovery program lineup was announced on July 24.

| English title | Original title | Director(s) | Production country |
|---|---|---|---|
| Aberdeen | | Ryan Cooper, Eva Thomas | Canada |
| Bonjour Tristesse | | Durga Chew-Bose | Canada, Germany |
| Boong | | Lakshmipriya Devi | India |
| The Courageous | Les Courageux | Jasmin Gordon | Switzerland |
| Diciannove | | Giovanni Tortorici | Italy |
| Do I Know You from Somewhere? | | Arianna Martinez | Canada |
| Freedom Way | | Afolabi Olalekan | Nigeria |
| Gülizar | | Belkıs Bayrak | Turkey, Kosovo |
| Horizonte | | César Augusto Acevedo | Colombia, France, Luxembourg, Chile, Germany |
| Ink Wash | | Sarra Tsorakidis | Romania, Greece, Denmark |
| Linda | | Mariana Wainstein | Argentina, Spain |
| Meat | | Dimitris Nakos | Greece |
| Mother Mother | | K'naan Warsame | Canada, Kenya, Somalia, United Kingdom, United States |
| My Fathers' Daughter | Biru Unjárga | Egil Pedersen | Norway, Sweden, Finland |
| On Falling | | Laura Carreira | United Kingdom, Portugal |
| The Paradise of Thorns | Wiman Nam | Boss Kuno | Thailand |
| The Party's Over | Fin de fiesta | Elena Manrique | Spain |
| The Quiet Ones | De Lydløse | Frederik Louis Hviid | Denmark |
| Really Happy Someday | | J Stevens | Canada |
| Saba | | Maksud Hossain | Bangladesh |
| Sad Jokes | | Fabian Stumm | Germany |
| Seeds | | Kaniehtiio Horn | Canada |
| Shook | | Amar Wala | Canada |
| U Are the Universe | | Pavlo Ostrikov | Ukraine, Belgium |
| Village Keeper | | Karen Chapman | Canada |
| You Are Not Alone | Vous n'êtes pas seuls | Marie-Hélène Viens, Philippe Lupien | Canada |

=== Platform ===
The Platform Prize program lineup was announced on July 23. The jury comprised filmmakers Atom Egoyan, Hur Jin-ho and Jane Schoenbrun.

| English title | Original title | Director(s) | Production country |
|---|---|---|---|
| Daniela Forever | | Nacho Vigalondo | Spain, Belgium |
| Daughter's Daughter | 女兒的女兒 | Huang Xi | Taiwan |
| Mr. K | | Tallulah H. Schwab | Netherlands, Belgium, Norway |
| Paying for It | | Sook-Yin Lee | Canada |
| Pedro Páramo | | Rodrigo Prieto | Mexico |
| They Will Be Dust | Polvo serán | Carlos Marqués-Marcet | Spain, Italy, Switzerland |
| Triumph | | Petar Valchanov, Kristina Grozeva | Bulgaria, Greece |
| Viktor | | Olivier Sarbil | Ukraine, United States |
| Winter in Sokcho | Hiver à Sokcho | Koya Kamura | France |
| The Wolves Always Come at Night | | Gabrielle Brady | Australia, Mongolia, Germany |

=== Midnight Madness ===
The Midnight Madness program lineup was announced on July 25.

| English title | Original title | Director(s) | Production country |
|---|---|---|---|
| Dead Mail | | Joe DeBoer, Kyle McConaghy | United States |
| Dead Talents Society | 鬼才之道 | John Hsu | Taiwan |
| Else | | Thibault Emin | France, Belgium |
| Escape from the 21st Century | 从21世纪安全撤离 | Yang Li | China |
| Friendship | | Andrew DeYoung | United States |
| The Gesuidouz | ザ·ゲスイドウズ | Kenichi Ugana | Japan |
| Ick | | Joseph Kahn | United States |
| It Doesn't Get Any Better Than This | | Rachel Kempf, Nick Toti | United States |
| The Shadow Strays | | Timo Tjahjanto | Indonesia |
| The Substance | | Coralie Fargeat | United Kingdom, United States, France |

=== Primetime ===
Primetime selections were announced on August 9.

The public premiere of The Tragically Hip: No Dress Rehearsal was followed by a public singalong of the Tragically Hip songs "Ahead by a Century", "Bobcaygeon" and "Grace, Too", led by Choir! Choir! Choir!, as part of the Festival Street activities.

| English title | Original title | Director(s) | Production country |
|---|---|---|---|
| Disclaimer | | Alfonso Cuarón | United Kingdom |
| Faithless | | Tomas Alfredson, Sara Johnsen | Sweden |
| Families like Ours | Familier som vores | Thomas Vinterberg | Denmark, France, Sweden, Czech Republic, Belgium, Norway, Germany |
| The Knowing | | Courtney Montour, Tanya Talaga | Canada |
| The Listeners | | Janicza Bravo, Jordan Tannahill | United Kingdom |
| M. Son of the Century | M. Il figlio del secolo | Joe Wright | Italy, France |
| Thou Shalt Not Steal | | Dylan River | Australia |
| The Tragically Hip: No Dress Rehearsal | | Mike Downie | Canada |

=== Short Cuts ===
Short Cuts selections were announced on August 9.

| English title | Original title | Director(s) | Production country |
|---|---|---|---|
| After Sunday | | Omolola Ajao | Canada |
| Aïda Neither | Aïda non plus | Elisa Gilmour | France |
| Alazar | | Beza Hailu Lemma | Ethiopia, France, Canada |
| Amarela | | André Hayato Saito | Brazil |
| Anotc ota ickwaparin akosiin | | Catherine Boivin | Canada |
| Are You Scared to Be Yourself Because You Think That You Might Fail? | | Bec Pecaut | Canada |
| Before They Joined Us | | Arshile Khanjian Egoyan | Canada |
| The Beguiling ishkwaazhe | | Shane McSauby | United States |
| The Best | | Ian Bawa | Canada |
| The Cost of Hugging | | Louis Bhose | United Kingdom |
| Deck 5B | Däck 5B | Malin Ingrid Johansson | Sweden |
| Don't F*ck With Ba | | Sally Tran | United States |
| Every Other Weekend | | Mick Robertson, Margaret Rose | Canada |
| Fantas | | Halima Elkhatabi | Canada |
| Fuck Me | | Anette Sidor | Sweden, Norway |
| Gender Reveal | | Mo Matton | Canada |
| Inkwo for When the Starving Return | Inkwo à la défense des vivants | Amanda Strong | Canada |
| Julian and the Wind | | Connor Jessup | Canada |
| Loser Baby | | Dakota Johnson | United States |
| The Man Who Could Not Remain Silent | Čovjek koji nije mogao šutjeti | Nebojša Slijepčević | Croatia, France, Bulgaria, Slovenia |
| Marion | | Joe Weiland, Finn Constantine | France, United Kingdom |
| Masterpiece Mommy | | Dorothy Sing Zhang | United Kingdom, China |
| Maybe Elephants | Kanskje det var elefanter | Torill Kove | Norway, Canada |
| Mercenaire | | Pier-Philippe Chevigny | Canada |
| Never Have I Ever | | Joyce A. Nashawati | France |
| O | | Rúnar Rúnarsson | Iceland, Sweden |
| On a Sunday at Eleven | | Alicia K. Harris | Canada |
| On the Way | Rrugës | Samir Karahoda | Kosovo |
| One Day This Kid | | Alexander Farah | Canada |
| Out for Ice Cream | Crème à glace | Rachel Samson | Canada |
| Percebes | | Alexandra Ramires, Laura Gonçalves | Portugal, France |
| perfectly a strangeness | | Alison McAlpine | Canada |
| Quota | Quotum | Job Roggeveen, Joris Oprins, Marieke Blaauw | Netherlands |
| Sauna Day | Sannapäiv | Anna Hints, Tushar Prakash | Estonia |
| Serve the Country | | Fabián Velasco, Miloš Mitrović | Canada |
| Silent Panorama | | Nicolas Piret | Belgium |
| Solemates | | James Rathbone, Mike Feswick | Canada |
| A Son & a Father | 1 Hijo & 1 Padre | Andrés Ramírez Pulido | France, Colombia |
| Stomach Bug | | Matty Crawford | United Kingdom |
| The Sunset Special 2 | | Nicolas Gebbe | Germany |
| Tenderness | | Helen Lee | Canada, South Korea |
| La Voix des Sirènes | | Gianluigi Toccafondo | France, Italy |
| Vox Humana | | Don Josephus Raphael Eblahan | Philippines, United States, Singapore |
| welima’q | | shalan joudry | Canada |
| Who Loves the Sun | | Arshia Shakiba | Canada |
| The Wolf | Le Loup | Theodore Ushev | Canada |
| Wrecked a Bunch of Cars, Had a Good Time | | James P. Gannon, Matt Ferrin | United States |
| The Yellow | | Maika Monroe, Simone Faoro | United States |

=== Wavelengths ===
Wavelengths selections were announced on August 8.

| English title | Original title | Director(s) | Production country |
|---|---|---|---|
| Adrift Potentials | Potenciais à deriva | Leonardo Pirondi | Brazil, United States |
| Archipelago of Earthen Bones: To Bunya | | Malena Szlam | Canada, Australia, Chile |
| The Ballad of Suzanne Césaire | | Madeleine Hunt-Ehrlich | United States |
| Being John Smith | | John Smith | United Kingdom |
| A Black Screen Too | | Rhayne Vermette | Canada |
| Collective Monologue | Monólogo colectivo | Jessica Sarah Rinland | Argentina, United Kingdom |
| The Damned | | Roberto Minervini | Italy, United States, Belgium |
| The Diary of a Sky | | Lawrence Abu Hamdan | Lebanon |
| Drama 1882 | | Wael Shawky | Egypt |
| exergue - on documenta 14 | | Dimitris Athiridis | Greece |
| Exposé du film annonce du film “Scénario” | | Jean-Luc Godard | France, Japan |
| Go Between | | Chris Kennedy | Canada, Australia |
| Grand Tour | | Miguel Gomes | Portugal, Italy, France, Germany, Japan, China |
| Lázaro at Night | Lázaro de noche | Nicolás Pereda | Canada, Mexico |
| Notes of a Crocodile | | Daphne Xu | Cambodia, China, Canada |
| October Noon | Octubre al mediodía | Francisco Rodríguez Teare | Chile, France |
| Pepe | | Nelson Carlo de los Santos Arias | Dominican Republic, Germany, France, Namibia |
| Perfumed with Mint | Moattar binanaa | Muhammed Hamdy | Egypt, France, Tunisia, Qatar |
| Revolving Rounds | | Johann Lurf, Christina Jauernik | Austria |
| Scénarios | | Jean-Luc Godard | France, Japan |
| The Sojourn | 暫棲 | Tiffany Sia | United States |
| Someplace in Your Mouth | | Beatrice Gibson, Nick Gordon | Italy |
| Viet and Nam | Trong lòng đất | Minh Quý Trương | Philippines, Singapore, France, Netherlands, Italy, Germany, Vietnam |
| Youth (Hard Times) | Qing Chun (Ku) | Wang Bing | France, Luxembourg, Netherlands |
| Youth (Homecoming) | Qing Chun (Gui) | Wang Bing | France, Luxembourg, Netherlands |

=== TIFF Classics ===
Classics selections were announced on August 8.

| English title | Original title | Director(s) | Production country |
|---|---|---|---|
| Awaara | | Raj Kapoor | India |
| Bona | | Lino Brocka | Philippines |
| Essene | | Frederick Wiseman | United States |
| Masala | | Srinivas Krishna | Canada |
| The Sweet Hereafter | | Atom Egoyan | Canada |
| Time of Maturity | Reifezeit | Sohrab Shahid-Saless | Germany |

=== Festival Street ===
Free outdoor screenings of classic films with thematic or production connections to films in the main festival program at David Pecaut Square.

| English title | Original title | Director(s) | Production country |
|---|---|---|---|
| Arrival | | Denis Villeneuve | United States |
| Dodgeball: A True Underdog Story | | Rawson Marshall Thurber | United States |
| Drumline | | Charles Stone III | United States |
| Footloose | | Herbert Ross | United States |
| Gattaca | | Andrew Niccol | United States |
| Ghost | | Jerry Zucker | United States |
| Ghostbusters | | Ivan Reitman | United States |
| The Karate Kid | | John G. Avildsen | United States |
| The Outsiders | | Francis Ford Coppola | United States |
| Pitch Perfect | | Jason Moore | United States |

== Film market ==
With the launch of a full film market having been announced for 2026, the 2024 festival included a larger selection than previous years of films that were screened for film buyers and all industry professionals at the festival, but not open to the general public. This included a mixture of films that had yet to be released at all, and films that had already been released in other countries but had not yet secured distribution in North America.

=== Industry Selects ===
| English title | Original title | Director(s) | Production country |
|---|---|---|---|
| 100 Litres of Gold | | Teemu Nikki | Finland |
| Code 3 | | Christopher Leone | United States |
| Locked | | David Yarovesky | United States |
| London Calling | | Allan Ungar | United States |
| Monsieur Aznavour | | Mehdi Idir | France |
| Noise | | Kim Soo-jin | South Korea |
| Rich Flu | | Galder Gaztelu-Urrutia | Spain |
| Skeet | | Nik Sexton | Canada |
| Transamazonia | | Pia Marais | France, Switzerland, Germany, Taiwan, Brazil |
| Yuppie | | Sergio Navarretta | Canada |

=== Market Screenings ===
| English title | Original title | Director(s) | Production country |
|---|---|---|---|
| The 47 | El 47 | Marcel Barrena | Spain |
| Africa, Cradle of Humankind and Modern Civilizations | L'Afrique, berceau de l'humanité et des civilisations modernes | Bénita Jacques | Canada |
| The American Backyard | L'orto americano | Pupi Avati | Italy |
| Americano | | Deny Gallagher | United States |
| And Their Children After Them | Leurs enfants après eux | Ludovic Boukherma, Zoran Boukherma | France |
| Average Joe | | Harold Cronk | United States |
| Battlefield | Campo di battaglia | Gianni Amelio | Italy |
| Compound Eyes of Tropical | | Fish Wang | Taiwan |
| Disciples in the Moonlight | | Brett Varvel | United States |
| Diva Futura | | Giulia Steigerwalt | Italy |
| Dullsville and the Doodleverse | | Ingi Erlingsson, Burnt Toast | Canada, United Kingdom, United States |
| Embrace Again | 穿過寒冬擁抱你 | Xue Xiaolu | China |
| Endless Journey | San da dui | Mo Dai | China |
| Feeling Better | Nonostante | Valerio Mastandrea | Italy |
| Forty-Seven Days with Jesus | | David M. Gutel, Emilio Palame | United States |
| Four Mothers | | Darren Thornton | Ireland |
| Ghost of the Dark Path | | Fish Wang | Taiwan |
| God's Not Dead: In God We Trust | | Vance Null | United States |
| Hitpig! | | Cinzia Angelini, David Feiss | Canada, United Kingdom |
| I Am No Queen | | Minu Basi | Canada |
| ICONS by Women in Cloud | | Dillion Leavitt | United States |
| Inexternal | | Kim Wai Yuen | Hong Kong |
| Inquiry of Shadows | | Rayah Ali | Canada, Belgium, United Kingdom, United States |
| Juna | | Jiban Century | Nepal |
| Last Breath | | Costa-Gavras | France |
| The Last Romantics | Azken erromantikoak | David Pérez Sañudo | Spain |
| Like Family | | Leah Walker | Canada |
| Love Never Ends | | Yan Han | China |
| Love, Courage and the Battle of Bushy Run | | Dave Alan Johnson, Larry A. McLean | United States |
| Marco, the Invented Truth | Marco, la verdad inventada | Jon Garaño and Aitor Arregi | Spain |
| Matador | | Giampaolo Manfreda | Spain |
| Memoir of a Snail | | Adam Elliot | Australia |
| Mother Mara | | Mirjana Karanović | Switzerland, Serbia, Luxembourg, Bosnia and Herzegovina, Montenegro, Slovenia |
| Old Fox | lǎo hú li | Hsiao Ya-chuan | Taiwan |
| Once in a Blue Moon | | Andy Lo | Hong Kong |
| The Otherside of History | | Onyeka Nwelue | Canada, Nigeria, United States |
| Peg O' My Heart | | Nick Cheung | Hong Kong |
| Post Truth | | Chengpeng Dong | China |
| The Price of Money: A Largo Winch Adventure | | Olivier Masset-Depasse | France |
| Ravens | | Mark Gill | Japan, France |
| Rita | | Paz Vega | Spain |
| The Rule of Jenny Pen | | James Ashcroft | New Zealand |
| The Ruse | | Stevan Mena | United States |
| The Saint of Varet | | Munnawar Bhagat | India |
| Sicilian Letters | Iddu | Antonio Piazza, Fabio Grassadonia | France, Italy |
| Skeleton Coast | | Robert O. Peters | Namibia |
| Sorry Mom | | Nabin Bogati | Nepal |
| Tara and Akash: Love Beyond Realms | | Srinivas Abrol | India |
| Taste the Revolution | | Daniel Klein | United States |
| Three Friends | Trois amies | Emmanuel Mouret | France |
| Transmitzvah | | Daniel Burman | Argentina |
| Trust | Confidenza | Daniele Luchetti | Italy |
| The Unwavering Brotherhood | | Terry Ng | Hong Kong |
| Viva La Vida | | Yan Han | China |
| The Wailing | El llanto | Pedro Martín-Calero | Spain, France, Argentina |
| When Fall Is Coming | Quand vient l'automne | François Ozon | France |
| When the Monsters Come Out | | James Amuta | Nigeria, Trinidad and Tobago |

== Canada's Top Ten ==
The festival's annual Canada's Top Ten list, selecting the ten best Canadian feature and short films of the year, was announced on January 8, 2025.

=== Feature films ===
- 40 Acres — R. T. Thorne
- Any Other Way: The Jackie Shane Story — Michael Mabbott, Lucah Rosenberg-Lee
- Can I Get a Witness? — Ann Marie Fleming
- Matt and Mara — Kazik Radwanski
- Paying for It — Sook-Yin Lee
- Rumours — Guy Maddin, Evan Johnson, Galen Johnson
- Seeds — Kaniehtiio Horn
- Shepherds (Bergers) — Sophie Deraspe
- The Shrouds — David Cronenberg
- Universal Language — Matthew Rankin

=== Short films ===
- Are You Scared to Be Yourself Because You Think That You Might Fail? — Bec Pecaut
- EarthWorm — Phillip Barker
- Inkwo for When the Starving Return — Amanda Strong
- Julian and the Wind — Connor Jessup
- Maybe Elephants — Torill Kove
- Mercenaire — Pier-Philippe Chevigny
- On a Sunday at Eleven — Alicia K. Harris
- One Day This Kid — Alexander Farah
- perfectly a strangeness — Alison McAlpine
- Who Loves the Sun — Arshia Shakiba
