= (Otto) =

- Film poster
- Directed by: Job Roggeveen; Joris Oprins; Marieke Blaauw
- Written by: Job Roggeveen; Joris Oprins; Marieke Blaauw
- Produced by: Job Roggeveen; Joris Oprins; Marieke Blaauw
- Release date: September 2015
- Running time: 10 minutes
- Country: Netherlands
- Language: No dialogue

(Otto) is a 2015 Dutch animated short film directed by Job Roggeveen, Joris Oprins and Marieke Blaauw, from the Dutch animation studio Job, Joris & Marieke. The film had its international premiere at the Toronto International Film Festival. (Otto) was chosen to be the official Dutch entry for the Academy Award Best Animated Short Film 2016. Job, Joris & Marieke's previous film A Single Life was nominated Academy Award for Best Animated Short Film at the 87th Academy Awards.

== Plot ==
A woman who can't have children steals the imaginary friend of a little girl and keeps this a secret from her husband. While the woman enjoys life with her imaginary child the gap between her and her husband grows bigger. When the little girl comes to claim back her imaginary friend, it's the power of imagination that brings everyone together.
