= Blaudzun (surname) =

Blaudzun is a Danish surname. Notable people with the surname include:

- Blaudzun, stage name of the Dutch singer-songwriter Johannes Sigmond (born 1974)
- Michael Blaudzun (born 1973), Danish cyclist
- Verner Blaudzun (born 1946), Danish cyclist, father of Michael
