= Peter Tangvald =

Norwegian sailor and adventurer (1924–1991)

- Per Tangvald
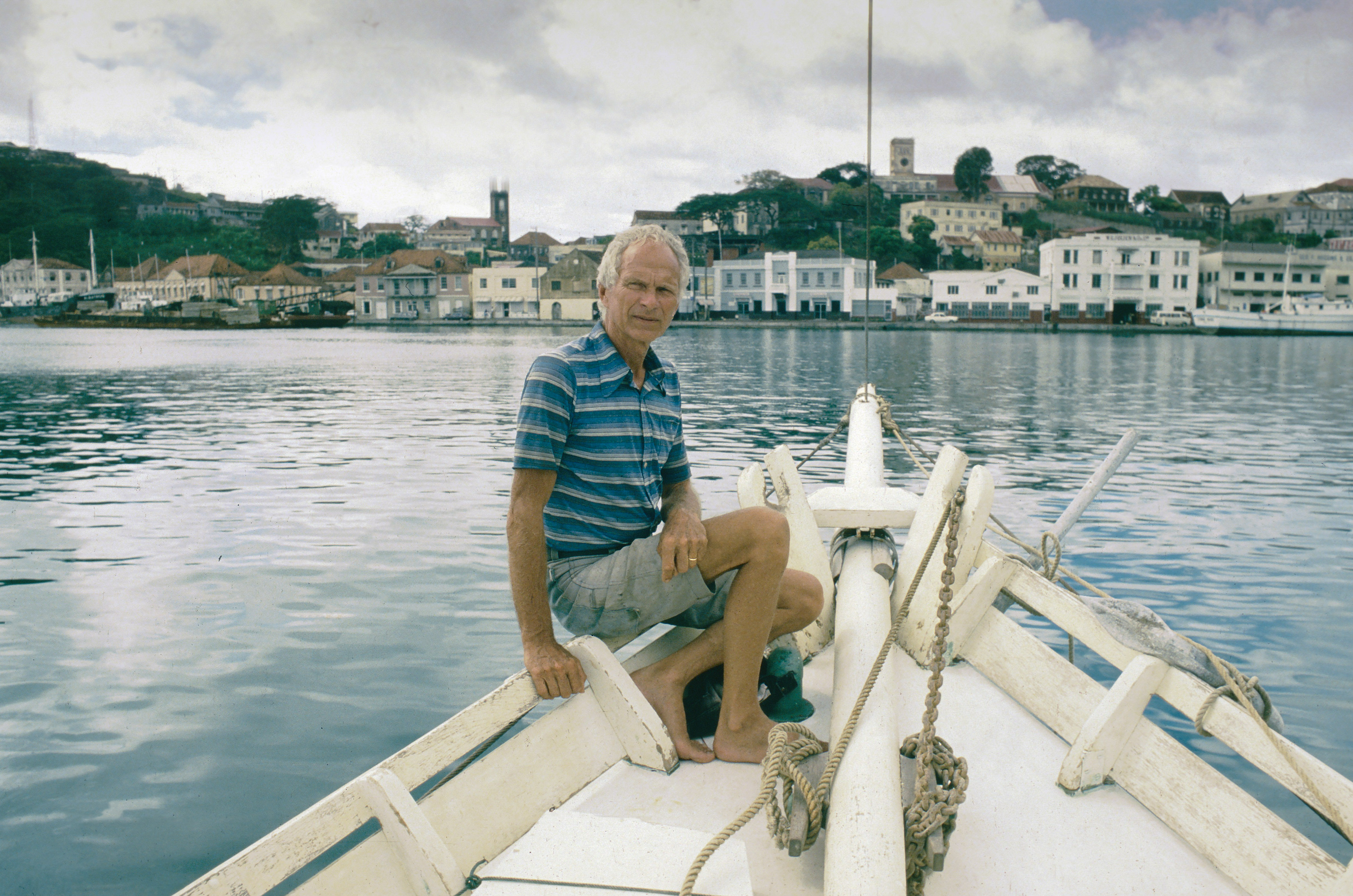
- in Grenada 1985
- Born: 27 September 1924; Oslo, Norway
- Died: 22 June 1991 (aged 66); Bonaire
- Cause of death: Shipwreck
- Occupations: Sailor, author

Peter Tangvald (born Per Tangvald, 27 September 1924, died 22 June 1991) was a Norwegian sailor and adventurer. Known as an early bluewater cruising pioneer and for his 1966 book Sea Gypsy, he became notorious after two of his seven wives died while sailing with him. The first, Lydia Balta, was shot by boarding pirates in the Sulu Sea on February 20, 1979. The second, Ann Ho Sau Chew, was lost overboard during a transatlantic passage on January 26, 1985. Peter himself was killed, along with his daughter Carmen, when his engineless 50-foot yacht, L'Artemis de Pytheas, was wrecked in Bonaire in June 1991. His son Thomas survived the wreck, but presumably suffered a similar fate when he disappeared at sea off the coast of Brazil aboard his own 34-foot yacht, Oasis, years later, in 2014.

In 2024, Peter's daughter Virginia Tangvald, who was just five years old when her father died, released Ghosts of the Sea (Les Enfants du large), a multimedia book and documentary film project about coming to terms with the loss of her father and brother. The book was published in September, while the film, a Canadian-French coproduction, premiered at the 2024 Festival du nouveau cinéma in October.

Peter Tangvald learned how to sail in Norway at age 14 and first took up bluewater ocean sailing in 1957, after emigrating from Norway to the United States. Aboard his first bluewater boat, a 45-foot teak yawl named Windflower that he purchased in England, he raced solo against another singlehanded sailor, Edward Allcard, from the Canary Islands to Antigua in November and December 1957. This technically was the first singlehanded transatlantic sailing race in history (Tangvald won by two days), though the 1960 OSTAR (won by Sir Francis Chichester) is more commonly cited as such.

Tangvald sailed Windflower to California and sold her there. He subsequently purchased another sailboat in England, a 32-foot cutter named Dorothea, which he sailed around the world, from 1961 to 1964, with his fourth wife, Simonne Orgias. This experience is described in Tangvald's first book, Sea Gypsy. During his circumnavigation, while in Tahiti, Tangvald worked as an extra, for $7 a day, on the film Mutiny on the Bounty (1962) and appeared in a very small speaking role opposite Marlon Brando in the mutiny scene.

Dorothea was lost at sea and sank southwest of Barbados on March 12, 1967, while Tangvald was sailing her singlehanded from South America to Florida. Tangvald abandoned the boat and survived by sailing a 7-foot plywood dinghy 55 miles to the island of Canouan, using a scrap of awning and an oar as a sailing rig. He designed and built his next and last boat, L'Artemis de Pytheas, in Cayenne, French Guiana, launching her in December 1973. He roamed the world aboard this boat until his death in 1991.

== Bibliography ==
- Sea Gypsy. Kimber. 1966. ISBN 0718303202.
- At Any Cost: Love, Life & Death at Sea : An Autobiography. Cruising Guide Publications. 1991. ISBN 0944428096.
