= Ali Weinstein =

Canadian documentary filmmaker

Ali Weinstein is a Canadian documentary filmmaker, most noted for her 2024 film Your Tomorrow, which documents the last year Ontario Place was open to the public before closing in 2024 for redevelopment.

The daughter of filmmaker Larry Weinstein, she premiered her feature documentary debut Mermaids at the Hot Docs Canadian International Documentary Festival in 2017, before collaborating with her father on the 2019 film The Impossible Swim for the television documentary series Engraved on a Nation.

In 2020 she directed #BLESSED, an episode of CBC Docs POV, and was the producer of Lulu Wei's documentary film There's No Place Like This Place, Anyplace about the closure and redevelopment of Toronto landmark Honest Ed's and neighbouring Mirvish Village.

Your Tomorrow premiered at the 2024 Toronto International Film Festival, where it was named second runner-up for the People's Choice Award for Documentaries.
