= Leigha Hancock =

American stunt actress

- Born: Leigha Kayleen Hancock
- Occupation: Stunt actress
- Years active: 2009–present
- Spouse: Bryan Moriarty (m. 2012)

Leigha Kayleen Hancock Moriarty is an American stunt actress best known for her role as the District 7 female tribute in The Hunger Games.

== Career ==
Hancock stands at 4 feet 11 inches (1.50 m) and has a background in gymnastics. Between 2009 and 2010 she had also appeared in Make It or Break It. Hancock co-starred in the 2013 film Admission. She has other experience as a gymnast, graduating from North Carolina State University. She married her husband, Bryan, on September 26, 2012.

== Filmography ==
| Year | Title | Role | Notes |
|---|---|---|---|
| 2009–2010 | Make It or Break It | Stunts: stunt double · dobles · stunt double: stunt double · stunt performer | 14 episodes |
| 2011 | Blue Bloods | Stunt actor · stunt double · stunt performer (Uncredited, episode, Uncredited) | 3 episodes |
| 2012 | The Hunger Games | Dobles | District 7 female |
| 2012 | The World Is Watching: Making the Hunger Games | Herself | Video special |
| 2013 | Deception | Dobles | Episode: "One, Two, Three... One, Two, Three" |
| 2013 | Delivery Man | Carly / Stunt performer | |
| 2013 | Admission | Yulia Karasov | |
| 2014–2022 | The Blacklist | Stunt performer | 3 episodes |
| 2015 | Louder Than Bombs | Stunt performer | |
| 2017 | The Voice of Silence | Dobles | |
| 2024 | Sketch | Evil Amber | |
