= Seth Worley =

American film director and writer (born 1984)

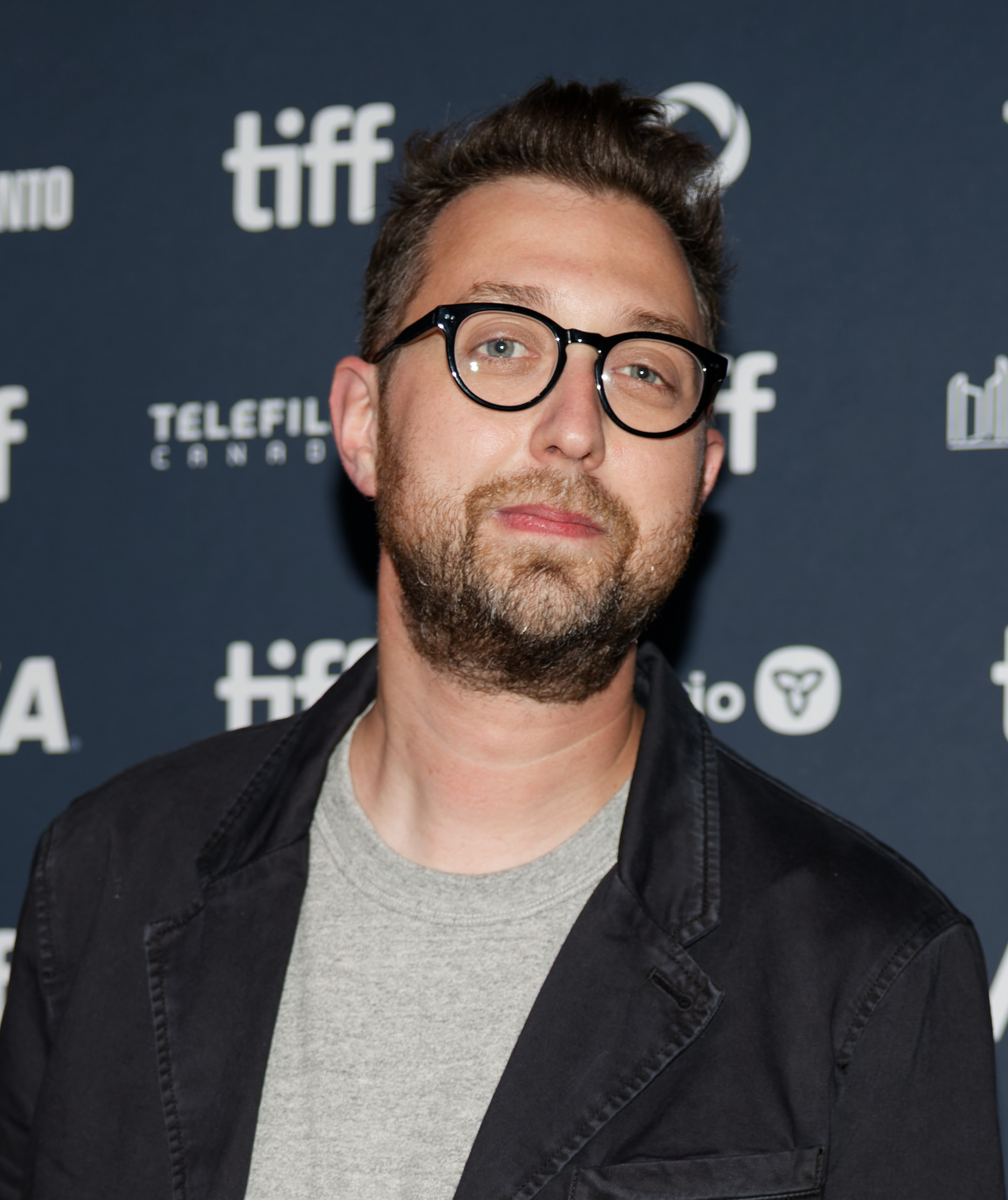
- Worley at the 2024 Toronto International Film Festival
- Born: Seth Byron Worley; April 26, 1984 (age 42); Tennessee, U.S.
- Years active: 1997–present

Seth Byron Worley (born April 26, 1984) is an American film director, writer, and entrepreneur who has created short films, commercials, explainer videos, and directed the film Sketch. Since 2012, he has served as senior content creator at Red Giant, creating short films and tutorials to market the software company's tools for visual effects and motion design. He also co-founded the company Plot Devices in 2017 which creates products for filmmaking.

In 2001 he, Karla Worley, Steven V. Taylor, Peter Kipley and Michael W. Smith won a Dove Award for Youth/Children's Musical of the Year for Friends 4ever.

In June 2011, Red Giant Software released a short directed and co-written by Seth, entitled Plot Device. The short was created to highlight features of Red Giant's Magic Bullet Suite of video tools.

His short films include: Plot Device (2011), Tempo (2012), Form 17 (2012), Spy Vs Guy (2013), Real Gone (2015), Old/New, Go Bag (2016), and The Time Closet (2006), which he adapted into a feature film. In 2013, he directed Space Fender Bender, a TV commercial for Star Trek Into Darkness and Esurance.

His film Sketch premiered at the 2024 Toronto International Film Festival. In April 2025, Angel Studios acquired the distribution rights for the movie, and set it for release in the United States on August 6, 2025.

He lives in Nashville, Tennessee with his wife and three children.

== See also ==
- Cinema of the United States
