= Mother Mother (2024 film) =

- Directed by: K'naan Warsame
- Written by: K'naan Warsame
- Produced by: Alex Kurtzman; Jenny Lumet; Andrea Calderwood
- Starring: Maan Youssouf Ahmed; Elmi Rashid Elmi; Hassan Najib; Ubah Egal
- Cinematography: César Charlone
- Edited by: Sabine Hoffman; Geraud Brisson
- Music by: Isobel Waller-Bridge
- Production companies: Secret Hideout; Potboiler Productions; 25 Stories
- Release date: September 6, 2024 (TIFF)
- Running time: 107 minutes
- Countries: Canada; Kenya; Somalia; United Kingdom; United States
- Languages: Somali; English

Mother Mother is a 2024 drama film written and directed by K'naan Warsame, in his directorial debut after being previously best known as a hip hop musician. The film stars Maan Youssouf Ahmed as Qalifo, a widowed mother in Somalia who must go to extraordinary lengths to restore the peace after her son, Asad (Elmi Rashid Elmi), is drawn into a violent confrontation with American tourist Liban (Hassan Najib).

== Plot ==
On a lonely farm in rural Somalia, the widowed Qalifo (Maan Youssouf Ahmed) and her college-age son Asad (Elmi Rashid Elmi) raise camels. Asad lives in the shadow of his late father's violent reputation and bristles at Qalifo's strict parenting, escaping to a nearby village whenever he can. And when Asad learns his girlfriend has been seeing another boy, the American visitor Liban (Hassan Najib), a confrontation is inevitable.

== Cast ==
- Maan Youssouf Ahmed as Qalifo
- Hassan Najib as Liban
- Elmi Rashid Elmi as Asad
- Ubah Egal as Kadro

== Production and release ==
The film was partially based on a real incident from Warsame's own life in Somalia prior to his family escaping to Canada as refugees. The lead character is named in memory of his aunt, who died of cancer just as production began on the film.

A co-production of companies from Kenya, Somalia, Canada, the United Kingdom and the United States, the film premiered in the Discovery program at the 2024 Toronto International Film Festival.

== Critical response ==
Beandra July of IndieWire graded the film a B+, writing that "by the end of 'Mother Mother' it dawned on me that this is precisely the kind of movie I come to TIFF for, a real voice that disabuses me of my assumptions, and my cynicism from the pain of watching so many movies that erase and belittle the Qalifas of the world. A movie that sends me back out into the light of day wondering."

At TIFF, the film won the FIPRESCI Prize.
