= Imago (2016 film) =

2016 short film

- Directed by: Raymund Ribay Gutierrez
- Written by: Raymund Ribay Gutierrez
- Starring: Ruby Ruiz; Upeng Fernandez; Louie Tan; Inna Tuason
- Cinematography: Joshua Reyles
- Edited by: Diego Marx Dobles
- Music by: Gian Gianan
- Production company: Center Stage Productions
- Release date: May 21, 2016 (Cannes)
- Running time: 15 minutes
- Country: Philippines
- Language: Tagalog

Imago is a Philippine short drama film, directed by Raymund Ribay Gutierrez and released in 2016. The film stars Ruby Ruiz as Inday, a woman balancing her job at a funeral home with being as single mother to a child with Down syndrome.

The film premiered in May 2016 at the 2016 Cannes Film Festival, in the short films competition program. In September it was screened at the 2016 Toronto International Film Festival, where it was named the winner of the award for Best International Short Film.
