= Fantas =

2024 Canadian short film

- Promotional poster
- Directed by: Halima Elkhatabi
- Written by: Halima Elkhatabi
- Produced by: Halima Elkhatabi
- Starring: Tania Doumbe Fines; Juan Mateo Barrera Gonzales; Bourriquet; Adam Hilali; Ryan Hilali
- Cinematography: Ménad Kesraoui
- Edited by: Xi Feng
- Music by: Pierre-Philippe «Pilou» Côté
- Production company: Les Films de l’Autre
- Distributed by: SPIRA
- Release dates: 6 September 2024 (TIFF); 19 February 2025 (Berlinale)
- Running time: 12 minutes
- Country: Canada
- Language: French

Fantas is a 2024 Canadian French-language short film directed by Halima Elkhatabi. The film follows Tania, who decides to take her horse Fantas to the city and introduce it to some friends in the working-class neighbourhood where she and her family live.

The film had its world premiere in Short Cuts at the 2024 Toronto International Film Festival as part of Short Cuts 2024 Programme 1, on September 6, 2024.

The film was selected in the Generation 14plus section at the 75th Berlin International Film Festival, where it will have its International premiere on 19 February 2025.

== Synopsis ==
Tania sets out to introduce her horse, Fantas, to her friends in her working-class neighborhood. By sharing her passion, she hopes to bridge two parts of her life that have always remained separate. As these worlds collide, an unexpected urban tale unfolds—one tinged with a hint of the surreal.

== Cast ==
- Tania Doumbe Fines
- Juan Mateo Barrera Gonzales
- Bourriquet
- Adam Hilali
- Rayan Hilali

== Production ==
Halima Elkhatabi written, produced and directed the short films with backing from the Canadian Film Cooperative SPIRA, which is dedicated to fostering the creation and production of independent films and ensuring their distribution within Canada and internationally.

== Release ==
Fantas had its world premiere in Short Cuts at the 2024 Toronto International Film Festival as part of Short Cuts 2024 Programme 1, on September 6, 2024.

It had its International premiere on 19 February 2025, as part of the 75th Berlin International Film Festival, in Generation 14plus.

It competed for the best Canadian short film in the National Competition for Short Films at the 2024 Festival du nouveau cinéma on October 10, 2024 and had its Quebec Premiere.

It will be screened in the Festivals in the Spotlight Film program at the Zagreb Film Festival on 12 November 2025.

== Accolades ==
Award	Date	Category	Recipient	Result	Ref.
Festival du nouveau cinéma	10 October 2024	Best Canadian Short Film	Halima Elkhatabi	Nominated	
Berlin International Film Festival	23 February 2025	Grand Prize for Best Film	Halima Elkhatabi	Nominated	
Canadian Screen Awards	1 June 2025	Best Live Action Short Drama	Halima Elkhatabi	Nominated	
Quebec Cinema Awards	December 7, 2025	Prix Iris for Best Live Action Short Film	Fantas	Nominated	
