= Virginia Tangvald =

Canadian writer and film director

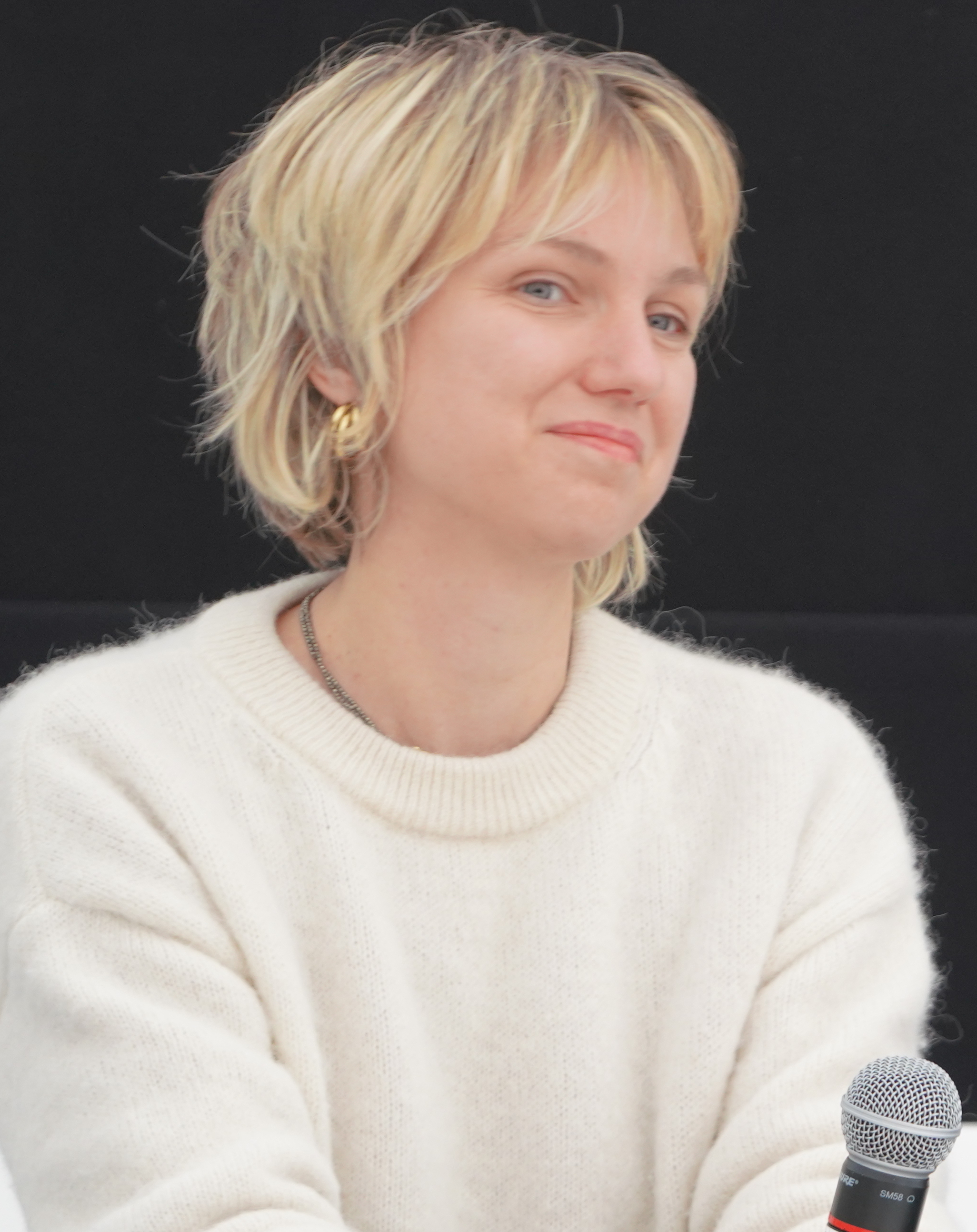
Tangvald at the Book on the Square in 2024

Virginia Tangvald is a Canadian film director from Quebec. She is most noted for her 2024 book and film project Ghosts of the Sea (Les Enfants du large).

The daughter of Norwegian mariner Peter Tangvald, she grew up in Canada with her québécoise mother after her parents' separation. She directed a number of short films, and a music video for Dear Criminals, in the 2010s prior to working on Ghosts of the Sea, whose initial outline won the Pitch Premières Œuvres prize at the 2020 Festival du nouveau cinéma.

Ghosts of the Sea centred on her search for more information about her father's death at sea in 1991, as well as the similar death of her older brother Thomas in 2014. The film premiered at the 2024 Festival du nouveau cinéma, where it won the TV5 Audience Award. It went into commercial release in 2025, as well as returning to the 2025 Festival du nouveau cinéma for a special screening featuring accommodations for viewers with hearing impairments.
