= Out for Ice Cream =

- French: Crème à glace
- Directed by: Rachel Samson
- Written by: Rachel Samson
- Produced by: Raquel Sancinetti; Félix Dufour-Laperrière
- Edited by: Rachel Samson; Xi Feng
- Music by: Samuel Gougoux
- Animation by: Rachel Samson; Louis Bodart; Rui Ting Ji; Camille Verreault
- Production company: Embuscade Films
- Distributed by: La Distributrice de films
- Release date: September 9, 2024 (TIFF)
- Running time: 9 minutes
- Country: Canada
- Language: French

Out for Ice Cream (French: Crème à glace) is a Canadian animated short film, directed by Rachel Samson and released in 2024. A reflection on the changing nature of friendship in childhood, he film centres on two young girls who, according to Samson, have been friends by circumstance more than any real connection, and who are sharing ice cream during the summer between graduating from elementary school and starting high school, where their friendship is destined to change and fade away.

The film premiered in the Short Cuts program at the 2024 Toronto International Film Festival, and was later screened at the Ottawa International Animation Festival, the 2024 Festival du nouveau cinéma and Animafest Zagreb.

The film received a Prix Iris nomination for Best Animated Short Film at the 27th Quebec Cinema Awards in 2025.
