= Sketch (2024 film) =

2024 American comedy fantasy film

- Theatrical release poster
- Directed by: Seth Worley
- Written by: Seth Worley
- Produced by: Steve Taylor; Tony Hale; Dusty Brown; Shun Lee Fong
- Starring: Tony Hale; D'Arcy Carden; Bianca Belle; Kue Lawrence; Kalon Cox
- Cinematography: Megan Stacey
- Edited by: Seth Worley
- Music by: Cody Fry
- Production company: Morphan Time
- Distributed by: Angel Studios; Wonder Project
- Release dates: September 7, 2024 (TIFF); August 6, 2025 (United States)
- Running time: 93 minutes
- Country: United States
- Language: English
- Budget: $3 million
- Box office: $10.8 million

Sketch is a 2024 American fantasy comedy film written and directed by Seth Worley. The film stars Tony Hale and D'Arcy Carden. The film was released to theatres on August 6, 2025, and received positive reviews from critics.

== Plot ==
Taylor Wyatt is a widowed father who hopes to sell his house with the help of his real estate agent sister Liz. His son Jack is an adventurous gamer and his daughter Amber is an aspiring artist who frequently draws in her sketchbook. Amber's violent, monstrous sketches cause trouble at school, but the school therapist recommends that she continue drawing as a means to channel her anger. One day, Jack trips while out in the woods outside his house and breaks his phone and injures his hand. He accidentally drops his phone into a nearby pond, but after retrieving it he notices that the phone is magically repaired and the scrapes on his hand have vanished. Jack secretly continues testing the pond's powers with more items, capturing his sister's attention. She follows Jack into the woods where her sketchbook — containing various genocidal monsters — accidentally falls into the pond.

The next day, the family notices strange yellow spots resembling bird droppings on their window, which Jack fears is an indicator that Amber's monsters have become alive as a result of their depictions making contact with the pond. He tries to explain the pond's power to his father but Taylor dismisses him. Amber's monsters proceed to haunt the town, exhibiting powers consistent with Amber's attribution of them in her sketchbook, including arachnid eyeballs named "eyeders" which canonically steal people's belongings.

One of Amber's monsters that she modelled after herself breaks into an office supplies shop to steal markers and sketchbooks. Meanwhile, during their ride to school, another monster lands on the school bus and takes the schoolchildren hostage. Under Amber's direction, they play soothing jazz music on an iPod to lull the monster, but as the next track plays, featuring a violent metal song, the monster is immediately awakened and begins chasing the children as they flee the bus.

Jack, Amber and fellow classmate Bowman reunite in the woods, where the siblings explain that they must make use of the pond to animate weapons and allied creatures that they could use to defeat the monsters. The three return to the siblings' home, now heavily damaged and almost completely looted by eyeders, where they begin sketching. After fighting off a wave of eyeders, the three make their way to the pond. Jack secretly brings along his mother's ashes, hoping to revitalize her too.

At the pond, they spot Amber's self-modelled monster sketching and animating more monsters using the office supplies it stole. Bowman attempts to kill it but is immediately overwhelmed. The siblings save him after they manage to animate their weapons and allied creatures in time, which begin battling the remaining monsters in town. Amber and Jack reunite with their father and Liz; Taylor implores Jack not to throw his mother's ashes in the pond, but Jack reveals that ashes had already been lost because of a hole in the wooden urn. They return to their home where they resume their ordinary lives.

== Cast ==
- Tony Hale as Taylor Wyatt
- D'Arcy Carden as Liz Wyatt
- Bianca Belle as Amber Wyatt
- Kue Lawrence as Jack Wyatt
- Kalon Cox as Bowman Lynch
- Jaxen Kenner as Demarcus Davidson
- Genesis Rose Brown as Carson Quinn
- Randa Newman as Miss Thompson
- Allie McCulloch as Ally Wyatt
- Nadia Benavides as Dr. Land
- Dajanae Cole as Maggie
- Josh Inocalla as Rick
- Tamiko Robinson Steele as Potential Buyer
- Mitch Miller as Potential Buyer 2
- Arielle Prepetit as Newlywed Wife
- Jesse Santoyo as Cop
- Leigha Hancock as Evil Amber

== Production ==
Worley's full-length directorial debut, the film is an expansion of his earlier proof-of-concept short film Darker Colors. Hale described the film as a cross between Jurassic Park and Inside Out.

== Release ==
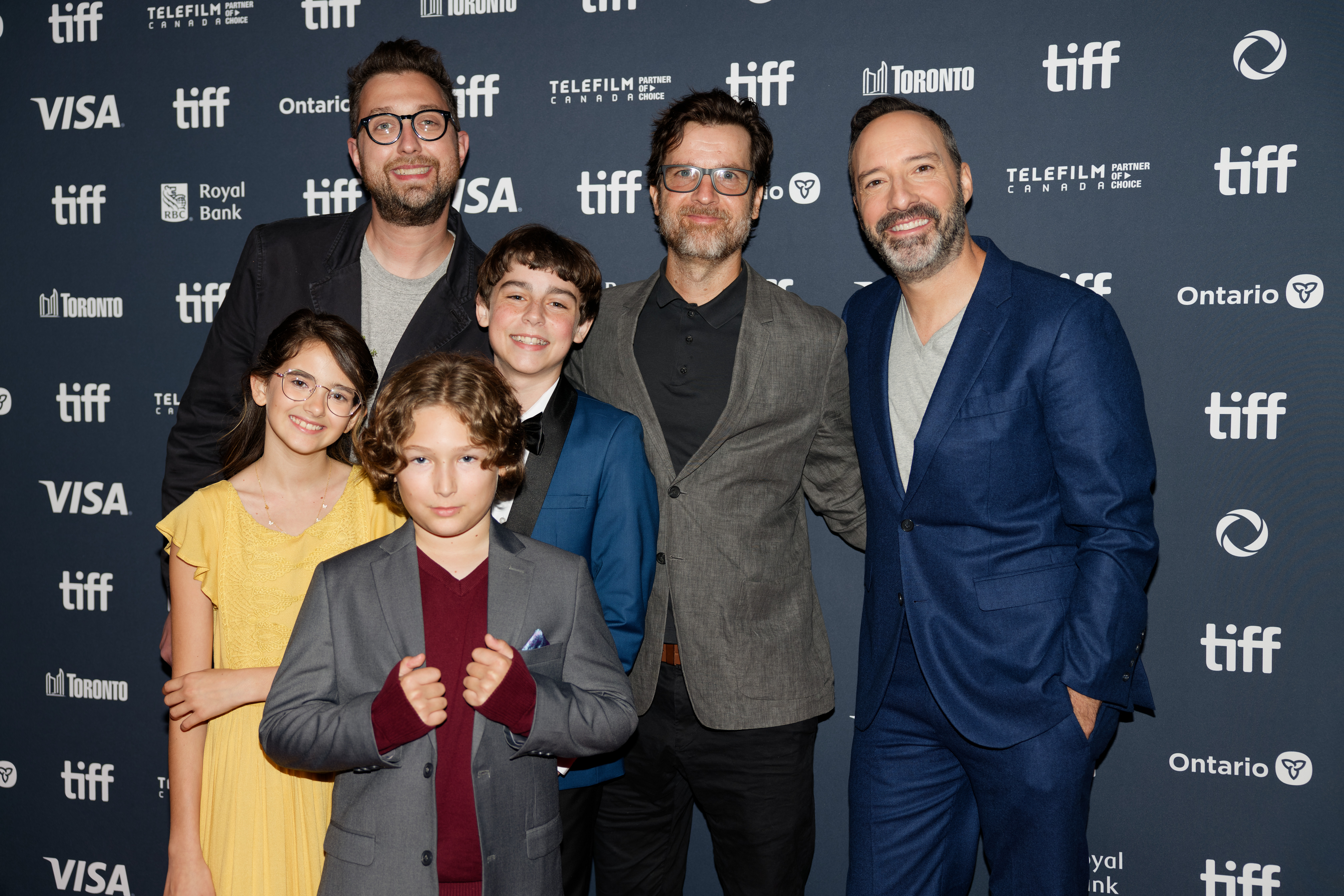
Cast and crew of Sketch at the 2024 Toronto International Film Festival

The film premiered in the Special Presentations program at the 2024 Toronto International Film Festival. The film was released in the United States on August 6, 2025.

== Reception ==
=== Critical response ===
On the review aggregator website Rotten Tomatoes, 95% of 79 critics' reviews are positive, with an average rating of 7.7/10. The website's consensus reads: "Sketch is an imaginative directorial debut that fuses dazzling visual creativity with heartfelt emotion to craft a vibrant celebration of art's transformative power and its role in healing grief." Metacritic, which uses a weighted average, assigned the film a score of 78 out of 100, based on 13 critics, indicating "generally favorable" reviews. Audiences polled by CinemaScore gave the film an average grade of "A-" on an A+ to F scale.

Victor Stiff of That Shelf positively reviewed the film, writing that "Belle, Lawrence, and Cox each get their moments to shine as the film's leads. Belle and Lawrence adeptly handle the film's weightier scenes, believably conveying all of Amber and Jack's emotional complexities."

Matthew Escosia of Film Geek Guy likens the movie to Steven Spielberg's earlier works, as it "never loses sight of these painful woes and realizations that come along with being a child filled with large emotions. The familial touches merges ambitious set pieces with tender scenes.

Jeremy K. Gover of the Untitled Film Project wrote that "Belle is a revelation and carries this movie with great authority. Her ability to balance grief with comedy while finding room to convey childhood innocence is remarkable, a rare find in child actors this young."

Nick Schager of The Daily Beast called the film "Spielberg-esque" and praised its pre-teen cast, writing, "Belle is both sullen and antagonistic as Amber, albeit not to an off-putting or monotonous degree; her solid performance positions the girl’s fury as an outgrowth of her crushing heartache. Lawrence, meanwhile, casts Jack as a smart and brave boy who’s desperate to mend himself and his loved ones, even to a reckless degree. Together, they’re two sides of a despondent coin, and yet the film never wallows in pain, finding constant ways to keep things spry and silly."

In a four-star review for RogerEbert.com, Marya E. Gates called it "a beautiful ode to that power, in its many forms, and a reminder that it’s never too late to work on your pain, not to let it overpower you, and to let the light inside you shine."

=== Box office ===
Sketch grossed $8.2 million in the United States and Canada, and $2.6 million in other territories, for a worldwide total of $10.8 million.
