= Quota (2024 film) =

2024 animated short film

- Dutch: Quotum
- Directed by: Job Roggeveen; Joris Oprins; Marieke Blaauw
- Production company: Job, Joris & Marieke
- Release date: 10 September 2024 (TIFF)
- Running time: 3 minutes
- Country: Netherlands
- Language: English

Quota (Dutch: Quotum) is a Dutch animated short film, directed by Job Roggeveen, Joris Oprins and Marieke Blaauw. The film depicts a world in which everybody must directly confront the impact of their actions on the environment, by carrying an app on their phones that tracks the carbon footprint of everything they do.

The film premiered at the 2024 Toronto International Film Festival, where it received an honorable mention for the Best International Short Film award.
