= Nina (2015 film) =

2015 Canadian short film

- Film poster
- Directed by: Halima Elkhatabi
- Written by: Halima Elkhatabi
- Produced by: Patricia Bergeron
- Starring: Elizabeth Tremblay-Gagnon
- Cinematography: Nicolas Canniccioni
- Edited by: Elisabeth Olga Tremblay
- Production company: Leitmotiv Productions
- Distributed by: Les Films du 3 mars
- Release date: September 13, 2015 (TIFF)
- Running time: 15 minutes
- Country: Canada
- Language: French

Nina is a Canadian short drama film, directed by Halima Elkhatabi and released in 2015. The film stars Elizabeth Tremblay-Gagnon as Nina, a teenage single mother in Montreal who is exhausted by the constant demands of caring for her baby, and goes out with her friends to briefly escape.

The film was screened at Not Short on Talent, Telefilm Canada's annual showcase of Canadian short films in the non-competitive industry market at the 2015 Cannes Film Festival, and had its public premiere at the 2015 Toronto International Film Festival.

In December 2015, the film was named to TIFF's annual year-end Canada's Top Ten list for short films.
