= Your Tomorrow =

2024 documentary film

- Film poster
- Directed by: Ali Weinstein
- Written by: Ali Weinstein
- Produced by: Geoff Morrison; Ali Weinstein
- Starring: Norm Di Pasquale; Steve Mann; Sherman Lam
- Cinematography: Andrew Moir; Jesse McCracken; Daniel Froidevaux
- Edited by: Caitlin Durlak
- Music by: Joseph Shabason
- Production companies: Naiad Productions; Big Cedar Films
- Distributed by: Blue Ice Docs
- Release date: September 12, 2024 (TIFF)
- Running time: 94 minutes
- Country: Canada
- Language: English

Your Tomorrow is a 2024 Canadian documentary film, directed by Ali Weinstein.

== Premise ==
The film profiles Ontario Place, the Toronto waterfront park and entertainment venue currently embroiled in a major controversy around proposals to redevelop it into a private for-profit spa and waterpark.

== Release ==
The film premiered at the 2024 Toronto International Film Festival. It has been acquired by Blue Ice Docs for commercial theatrical distribution, with a television broadcast on TVOntario scheduled in 2025.

At TIFF, the film was named second runner-up for the Toronto International Film Festival People's Choice Award: Documentaries.

The film was named as a finalist for the Rogers Best Canadian Documentary Award at the Toronto Film Critics Association Awards 2024.
