= Ghosts of the Sea =

2024 Canadian-French documentary film by Virginia Tangvald

- Film poster
- French: Les Enfants du large
- Directed by: Virginia Tangvald
- Written by: Virginia Tangvald
- Produced by: Nathalie Cloutier; Isabelle Couture; Élaine Hébert
- Cinematography: Glauco Bermudez; Étienne Roussy
- Edited by: Marie-Pier Dupuis; Elric Robichon
- Music by: Rémi Boubal
- Production company: National Film Board of Canada
- Release date: October 14, 2024 (FNC)
- Running time: 98 minutes
- Countries: Canada; France
- Languages: English; French

Ghosts of the Sea (French: Les Enfants du large) is a Canadian-French multimedia book and documentary film project by Virginia Tangvald, released in 2024. The book and the film both centre on her search for more information and understanding about her father, Norwegian adventurer Peter Tangvald, and her brother, Thomas Tangvald, who both died in separate shipwreck incidents in 1991 and 2014.

The book was published in September, while the film premiered in the National Competition at the 2024 Festival du nouveau cinéma.

== Critical response ==
Reviewing the film when it screened at the 2025 Hot Docs Canadian International Documentary Festival, Courtney Small of Point of View magazine wrote that "Sailing on the dark waters of the past, Ghosts of the Sea builds a poetic blueprint for how the male ego can tangle itself to the anchor of tragedy. Through archival footage of Thomas and Peter, and incorporating interviews with friends, navigation experts, family, and her own inner thoughts, Tangvald presents a vivid portrait of a family that has endured an unimaginable amount of grief. As her camera repeatedly lingers on the ocean, forcing the audience to contemplate both the vastness of nature and the shortsightedness of man, one cannot help but ponder what Thomas’ life might have been like had Peter not been an all-consuming destructive force."

== Awards ==
At FNC, the film won the TV5 Audience Award. Tangvald's initial proposal for the film was previously the winner of the Pitch Premières Œuvres prize at the 2020 Festival du nouveau cinéma.

Glauco Bermudez and Étienne Roussy won the Prix Iris for Best Cinematography in a Documentary at the 27th Quebec Cinema Awards in 2025.

The film was a finalist for the Rogers Best Canadian Documentary award at the Toronto Film Critics Association Awards 2025.
