= Jo Jo in the Stars =

- Directed by: Marc Craste
- Written by: Marc Craste
- Produced by: Sue Goffe
- Starring: Oliver Miceli; Andrew Stirk
- Edited by: William Eagar
- Music by: Die Knödel (Harlem in Brünn, 1993); Samuel Barber (Andante of Violin Concerto op. 14, 1939); Toru Yamanaka (from Dumb Type, More Wings for Wheelers, 1998); Urchin (Texas Yellow, 2001)
- Production company: Studio AKA
- Release date: 22 November 2003
- Running time: 12 minutes
- Country: United Kingdom
- Language: English

Jo Jo in the Stars is a twelve-minute film that won the 2004 BAFTA Award for Best Animated Short Film. Created and directed by Marc Craste, it was indirectly inspired by "The Carny", a song by Nick Cave and the Bad Seeds.

== Plot ==
Madame Pica is the cold-hearted mistress of a circus of "monsters and misfits", attended each night by thousands of curious spectators. Hero is among them every night, but he is there only to see Jo Jo, the winged trapeze artist. One night after the show, he steals the keys of the cell where Jo Jo is imprisoned, freeing her. The two escape and start to dance a romantic waltz in the stars. But soon the two lovers are discovered and as a last desperate act, hand-in-hand, they jump from the highest window in the tower. Jo Jo attempts to fly the two of them to safety, but Hero loses his grip and falls to the ground. Jo Jo is blown onto a window sill and re-captured by Madame Pica. A single feather from JoJo's wing floats to the ground, landing on Hero's apparently lifeless body.

Ten years pass, and Madame Pica is in search of some new attraction to draw in the crowds. She discovers that Hero is still alive but horribly disfigured, and takes him on as the new star of the show. He is taken to the cell next to JoJo's, and the reunited lovers embrace through the bars.

== Production ==
Marc Craste's original aim was to make a short film based on "The Carny", a song by Nick Cave and the Bad Seeds. He began work on a storyboard, intending it to be a "straight visual interpretation of the text", featuring live action sequences combined with 3D animation. He received encouragement from Nick Cave, but was ultimately unable to secure funding for the project.

In the following years, Craste made three one-minute films for Studio AKA, starring Madame Pica in a circus setting. Studio AKA then asked Craste to make "a longer film using the same characters, but without any murders". JoJo in the Stars was the result.

Craste's influences include David Lynch's Eraserhead (1977) and Wim Wenders's Wings of Desire (1987). The Nick Cave song "The Carny" is featured in the film 'Wings of Desire'.

=== Personnel ===
- Marc Craste - Director, Writer
- Sue Goffe - Producer, Executive producer
- Oliver Miceli – voice
- Andrew Stirk – voice
- Mike Cachuela - Storyboard Artist (uncredited)
- Dominic Griffiths - Animator
- Boris Kossmehl - Animator
- Fabienne Rivory - Animator
- William Eagar - Editor
- Melissa Lake – foley artist
- Ben Meechan – sound editor
- Barnaby Smith – foley editor
- Michele Woods – sound mixer
- Hilary Wyatt – supervising sound editor
- Ren Pesci - Production Assistant
- Lindsay Fraine - Production Assistant

== Awards ==
Jo Jo in the Stars has won the following awards:

Year	Award	Category – Recipient(s)
2004	Clermont-Ferrand Short Film Festival	Prix du Meilleur Film d'Animation
2004	Bradford Animation Festival	Grand Prix
2004	British Academy of Film and Television Arts (BAFTA) Film Awards	Best Animation Short
2004	Aspen Shortsfest	Special Jury Recognition
2004	Copenhagen 3D Awards	Digital Hero Award for the Best Short Film
2004	Seoul International Cartoon and Animation Festival (SICAF)	Animasia Grand Prize for Short Film
2004	Bristol International Short Film Festival (BriefEncounters)	Best of British
2005	Paris Les Lutins du Court-Métrage	Press Lutin
2005	Cartoon d'or	Cartoon d'or
2007	IFCT Awards	Most Innovative Animation

The film has been screened at more than 80 festivals to date, including: Melbourne International Film Festival Short Film Competition, Sydney Film Festival, Anima Mundi, Cinémathèque québécoise, Prend ça court! (Montreal), Zagreb Film Festival, Tampere Film Festival, Annecy International Animated Film Festival (CICA), Festival Némo (Paris), Tübingen International Short Film Festival (Tübingen), Wiesbaden International Weekend of Animation (Wiesbaden), Holland Animation Film Festival, Holland Youth Film Festival, 10110 (India), Darklight Festival (Ireland), Cartoombria (Perugia), Castelli Animati (Genzano di Roma), Kraków Film Festival, IndieLisboa (Vila do Conde), Donostia Kultura (San Sebastián), Sitges Film Festival, SWAMP (Switzerland), British Animation Awards (BAA), Edinburgh International Film Festival (EIFF), Glastonbury Festival, onedotzero, Raindance Film Festival (London), Rêl Institiwt (Real Institute; Wales), Soho Shorts Film Festival, SAND, Independent Film Festival of Boston, Los Angeles Film Festival, Tallgrass Film Festival, and The World According to Shorts in 2004.

Adelaide Film Festival, Anima, Hong Kong InDPanda International Short Film Festival, Tehran International Animation Festival (Tehran), Skopje Film Festival, Norwegian Film Institute, Future Shorts (South Africa), Fantoche Film Festival (Switzerland), Draken Film Festival (Sweden), Stockholm International Film Festival, Golden Horse Film Festival, Turkey British Council (tour of Turkey), Animated Encounters (United Kingdom), Animex (University of Teesside), Cambridge Film Festival, Cinemagic, Commonwealth Film Fest (Manchester), Hertfordshire International Film Festival (HIFF), London Institute's Arts Festival, Northern Film Network (UK), Norwich Film Festival, Antelope Valley Independent Film Festival, Brooklyn In Film Fest, Milwaukee International Film Festival, Portland International Film Festival, REDCAT, Red Stick International Animation Festival (Louisiana) in 2005.

Singapore RestFest, Bucharest Festival, Short bl Movifest (Russia), Kyiv IFF Molodist Festival, Animacor (Spain), Flip Animation Festival (UK), and Milwaukee International Film Festival in 2006. Ankara Uluslararasi Film Festivali (International Film Festival), Taiwan International Animation Festival, and CineGuernsey (Guernsey) in 2007. Berlin International Film Festival, Lucca Animation, Brussels Short Film Festival, Rooftop Films, Fresh Film Festival in 2008.
