= A Single Body =

2014 short film

- French: Un seul corps
- Directed by: Sotiris Dounoukos
- Written by: Sotiris Dounoukos
- Produced by: Lucie Duchêne; Julien Gittinger; Alexandre Perrier
- Starring: Mexianu Medenou; Doudou Masta; Garba Tounkara
- Cinematography: Léonidas Arvanitis
- Edited by: Angelos Angelidis
- Music by: Antonio Gambale
- Production companies: Kidam; Magnetic Films
- Release date: August 10, 2014 (MIFF)
- Running time: 20 minutes
- Countries: Australia; France; Greece
- Language: French

A Single Body (French: Un seul corps) is a short drama film, directed by Sotiris Dounoukos and released in 2014. The film centres on David (Mexianu Medenou) and Wani (Doudou Masta), two workers in a slaughterhouse whose dreams of opening their own butcher shop are threatened by the arrival of new coworker Patate (Garba Tounkara).

The film premiered in August 2014 at the Melbourne International Film Festival. In September it was screened at the 2014 Toronto International Film Festival, where it was named the winner of the award for Best International Short Film. In 2015 it was screened at the Sydney Film Festival, where it was the winner of the Dendy Live Action Short Award.
