= Living Together (2024 film) =

2024 documentary film

- French: Cohabiter
- Directed by: Halima Elkhatabi
- Written by: Halima Elkhatabi
- Produced by: Nathalie Cloutier
- Cinematography: Josué Bertolino
- Edited by: Yousra Benziane
- Production company: National Film Board of Canada
- Release date: September 10, 2024 (TIFF)
- Running time: 75 minutes
- Country: Canada
- Language: French

Living Together (French: Cohabiter) is a Canadian documentary film, directed by Halima Elkhatabi and released in 2024. The film profiles several people in Montreal who are interviewing and getting to know potential roommates.

The film premiered at the 2024 Toronto International Film Festival. It is slated to open commercially in Montreal on September 13.
