= Deck 5B =

2024 short film

- Film poster
- Swedish: Däck 5B
- Directed by: Malin Ingrid Johansson
- Written by: Malin Ingrid Johansson
- Produced by: Andrea Gyllenskiöld; Adam Holmström; Joel Rostmark
- Starring: Alma Pöysti; Krister Kern; Enar Malbert
- Cinematography: Stellan Runge
- Edited by: Andreas Nilsson
- Music by: Håkan Eriksson
- Production company: Pine
- Release date: 5 September 2024 (TIFF)
- Running time: 15 minutes
- Country: Sweden
- Language: Swedish

Deck 5B (Swedish: Däck 5B) is a Swedish short drama film, directed by Malin Ingrid Johansson and released in 2024. The film stars Alma Pöysti as Mia, a mother torn between the needs of her son and her own personal ambitions.

The cast also includes Krister Kern and Enar Malbert.

The film premiered at the 2024 Toronto International Film Festival, where it was named the winner of the Best International Short Film award.
