= Toronto International Film Festival Best Canadian Discovery Award =

Annual film award

The Toronto International Film Festival Best Canadian Discovery Award is an annual film award, presented by the Toronto International Film Festival to a film judged to be the best Canadian first or second feature film by an emerging Canadian director.

The award was previously presented from 1997 to 2019 as Best Canadian First Feature, and was discontinued after the 2019 Toronto International Film Festival. It was revived in 2024 under its current name. Concurrently with the award's reintroduction, TIFF announced that the Best Canadian Film will now be restricted to filmmakers who are releasing their third or later films, with first and second films eligible for the Discovery award. With the award's opening to second films, Matthew Rankin became the first, and so far only, director ever to win the award twice.

As with all of TIFF's juried awards, the jury has the discretion to grant one or more honorable mentions in addition to the main award winner.

== Winners ==
† denotes a film which also won the Best First Feature award at the Genie Awards or the Canadian Screen Awards.

=== Best Canadian First Feature (1997-2019) ===
Year	Film	Director	Reference
1997
1997	Cube	Vincenzo Natali	
1998
1998	Last Night †	Don McKellar	
1999
1999	Just Watch Me: Trudeau and the '70s Generation	Catherine Annau	
1999	Full Blast	Rodrigue Jean	
2000
2000	The Left-Hand Side of the Fridge (La Moitié gauche du frigo) †	Philippe Falardeau	
2000	Red Deer	Anthony Couture	
2001
2001	Inertia	Sean Garrity	
2002
2002	Marion Bridge	Wiebke von Carolsfeld	
2003
2003	Love, Sex and Eating the Bones	Sudz Sutherland	
2004
2004	White Skin (La Peau blanche) †	Daniel Roby	
2005
2005	The Life and Hard Times of Guy Terrifico	Michael Mabbott	
2006
2006	On the Trail of Igor Rizzi (Sur la trace d'Igor Rizzi)	Noël Mitrani	
2007
2007	Continental, a Film Without Guns (Continental, un film sans fusil)	Stéphane Lafleur	
2008
2008	Before Tomorrow (Le Jour avant le lendemain)	Marie-Hélène Cousineau, Madeline Ivalu	
2008	Borderline	Lyne Charlebois	
2009
2009	The Wild Hunt	Alexandre Franchi	
2010
2010	The High Cost of Living	Deborah Chow	
2011
2011	Citizen Gangster	Nathan Morlando	
2011	Nuit #1 †	Anne Émond	
2012
2012	Antiviral	Brandon Cronenberg	
2012	Blackbird	Jason Buxton	
2013
2013	Asphalt Watches	Shayne Ehman, Seth Scriver	
2014
2014	Bang Bang Baby †	Jeffrey St. Jules	
2015
2015	Sleeping Giant	Andrew Cividino	
2016
2016	Old Stone †	Johnny Ma	
2017
2017	Luk'Luk'I	Wayne Wapeemukwa	
2018
2018	Roads in February (Les routes en février)	Katherine Jerkovic	
2019
2019	The Twentieth Century	Matthew Rankin	

=== Best Canadian Discovery (2024-present) ===
Year	Film	Director	Reference
2024	Universal Language (Une langue universelle)	Matthew Rankin	
2024	You Are Not Alone (Vous n'êtes pas seuls)	Marie-Hélène Viens, Philippe Lupien	
2025	Blue Heron	Sophy Romvari	
2025	100 Sunset	Kunsang Kyirong	
2026	Smudge the Blades	Cody Lightning	
2026	The Black Box Is Orange	Yuula Benivolski	

== See also ==
- John Dunning Best First Feature Award
- Prix Iris for Best First Film
