= Galen Johnson =

American philosopher

Philosophical work
- Era: 20th-century philosophy
- Region: Western Philosophy
- School: Continental philosophy,
- Main interests: aesthetics, phenomenology, ontology,

Galen A. Johnson (born 1948) is an American philosopher who is professor emeritus of philosophy at the University of Rhode Island and the General Secretary of the International Merleau-Ponty Circle.

== Education and background ==
Johnson received his Ph.D. in Philosophy from Boston University in 1977. He has been teaching at the University of Rhode Island since 1976. His research interests include phenomenology, aesthetics, American philosophy, and recent French philosophy. He is the author of numerous articles in contemporary continental philosophy and has held fellowships from the National Endowment for the Humanities, the American Council for Learned Societies, and the American Philosophical Society. He has published four books that deal with aesthetics. Johnson convened over the URI Center for the Humanities from 1994 to 1996, and was Director of the center from 2007 to 2013.

== Publications ==
- 1989: Earth and Sky, History and Philosophy ISBN 0820405582
- 1990: Ontology and Alterity in Merleau-Ponty ISBN 0810108739
- 1993: The Merleau-Ponty Aesthetics Reader ISBN 0810110741
- 2010: The Retrieval of the Beautiful ISBN 0810125668

== Awards ==
- 1996: URI Teaching Excellence Award
- URI Center for the Humanities Subvention grant, for his book The Retrieval of the Beautiful: Thinking Through Merleau-Ponty’s Aesthetics.
- 2009: URI Center for the Humanities Visiting Scholar grant, for the visit of Professor Duane Davis of the University of North Carolina-Asheville.
- 2014: URI Center for the Humanities Faculty Subvention grant, for his forthcoming book Merleau-Ponty’s Poets and Poetics.
