= Philippe Lupien =

Philippe Lupien (born June 19, 1986) is a Canadian filmmaker and screenwriter from Montreal, Quebec, who works primarily in partnership with his spouse Marie-Hélène Viens. They are most noted for their 2024 film You Are Not Alone (Vous n'êtes pas seuls).

The film premiered in the Discovery program at the 2024 Toronto International Film Festival, where it received an honorable mention for the Best Canadian Discovery Award, and was subsequently shortlisted for the 2024 Jean-Marc Vallée DGC Discovery Award.

High school friends before becoming a couple, they collaborated on a number of short films prior to You Are Not Alone. He has also directed short and television films on his own separately from Viens.

== Filmography ==
- Mr. Simard's Halloween (L'Halloween de Monsieur Simard) - 2009
- Le diable en personne - 2011, with Vincent Éthier
- Bernard the Great (Bernard le grand) - 2013, with Marie-Hélène Viens
- Amen - 2016, with Marie-Hélène Viens
- We Are the Freak Show (Nous sommes le freak show) - 2017, with Marie-Hélène Viens
- One of a Kind Love - 2021
- You Are Not Alone (Vous n'êtes pas seuls) - 2024, with Marie-Hélène Viens
