= You Are Not Alone (2024 film) =

- Film Poster (English)
- French: Vous n'êtes pas seuls
- Directed by: Marie-Hélène Viens; Philippe Lupien
- Screenplay by: Marie-Hélène Viens; Philippe Lupien
- Produced by: Fanny-Laure Malo
- Starring: Pier-Luc Funk; Marianne Fortier; François Papineau
- Cinematography: Ariel Méthot
- Edited by: Amélie Labrèche
- Music by: Pierre-Philippe Côté
- Production company: La Boîte à Fanny
- Distributed by: Maison 4:3
- Release date: September 11, 2024 (TIFF)
- Running time: 105 minutes
- Country: Canada
- Language: French

You Are Not Alone (French: Vous n'êtes pas seuls) is a Canadian romantic comedy science fiction film, directed by Marie-Hélène Viens and Philippe Lupien and released in 2024. The film stars Pier-Luc Funk as Léo, an aimless young man in Montreal who meets and falls in love with Rita (Marianne Fortier), a musician, while being unknowingly targeted by an alien (François Papineau) who is preying on the city's young slackers.

The cast also includes Sandrine Bisson, Blaise Tardif, Micheline Lanctôt and Florence Blain Mbaye.

The film premiered in the Discovery program at the 2024 Toronto International Film Festival.

The film was shortlisted for the 2024 Jean-Marc Vallée DGC Discovery Award. At TIFF, it received an honorable mention for the Best Canadian Discovery Award.

== Critical response ==
The film has generally positive reviews.

Joe Lipsett wrote on QueerHorrorMovies.com: "What’s so commendable about You Are Not Alone is how Lupien and Viens don’t overplay their hand. The unconventional elements of the aliens (the fridge, John’s ability to stun and compel victims) are the only true “supernatural” elements in an otherwise grounded film. And You Are Not Alone is all the better for it. There’s an emotional honesty in Rita and Léo’s relationship that is achingly believable and the strange alien story beats work to complement and augment the audience’s investment in the film’s central relationship."

On Elements of Madness, Justin Waldman awarded the film 3/5, and said: "Philippe Lupien and Marie-Hélène Viens craft a romance that is blended with science fiction that unfortunately doesn’t lean into either category too heavily. While the exploration of both genres is touched upon, further fleshing them out would cast a wider net of appeal, but thankfully the brilliance distilled upon the film from the two leads brings the genre mashup to par and creates a world for the audience to get lost in, even if the payoff is slightly underwhelming."
