= Toronto International Film Festival Award for Best International Short Film =

Annual Canadian film award

The Toronto International Film Festival Award for Best International Short Film is an annual film award, presented by the Toronto International Film Festival to a film judged to be the best short film by an international filmmaker at the festival. The award was presented for the first time in 2014.

== Winners ==
Year	Film	Director	Ref
2014	A Single Body	Sotiris Dounoukos	
2015	Maman(s)	Maïmouna Doucouré	
2016	Imago	Raymund Ribay Gutierrez	
2017	The Burden (Min börda)	Niki Lindroth von Bahr	
2017	A Gentle Night	Qiu Yang	
2018	The Field	Sandhya Suri	
2018	Fuck You	Anette Sidor	
2018	This Magnificent Cake! (Ce magnifique gâteau !)	Emma de Swaef, Marc James Roels	
2019	All Cats Are Grey in the Dark (Nachts sind alle Katzen grau)	Lasse Linder	
2019	The Nap	Federico Luis Tachella	
2020	Dustin	Naïla Guiguet	
2021	Displaced (Pa Vend)	Samir Karahoda	
2021	Trumpets in the Sky	Rakan Mayasi	
2022	Snow in September (9-р Сарын Цас)	Lkhagvadulam Purev-Ochir	
2022	Airhostess-737	Thanasis Neofotistos	
2023	Electra	Daria Kashcheeva	
2024	Deck 5B (Däck 5B)	Malin Ingrid Johansson	
2024	Quota (Quotum)	Job Roggeveen, Joris Oprins, Marieke Blaauw	
2025	Talk Me	Joecar Hanna	
2025	Agapito	Arvin Belarmino, Kyla Danelle Romero	
2026	MAMMALIA	Elia Kalogianni	
2026	The Spectacular Death of Prisca	Kaelo Iyizoba	
