= A Single Life (2014 film) =

2014 film

- Film poster
- Directed by: Marieke Blaauw; Joris Oprins; Job Roggeveen
- Written by: Job Joris Mareike
- Produced by: Job Joris Mareike
- Release date: September 2014
- Running time: 3 minutes
- Country: Netherlands
- Language: English

A Single Life is a 2014 Dutch animated short film directed by Marieke Blaauw, Joris Oprins and Job Roggeveen, from Dutch animation studio Job, Joris & Marieke. It was nominated for the Academy Award for Best Animated Short Film at the 87th Academy Awards.

== Plot ==
The film is about a young woman, Pia, who receives a mysterious 45 rpm record and discovers that she can travel through time to different stages of her life when different parts of the record are played. The film does not feature any spoken dialogue though it does incorporate the titular song "A Single Life" by Happy Camper featuring Pien Feith.

According to Oprins, the film took three months to make and was originally inspired by an incident where a record skipped while being played. The duration of the film was limited because the film was originally intended to be screened at movie theaters prior to the showing of feature-length films.

== Cast ==
- Pien Feith as (voice)
