= Marie-Hélène Viens =

Canadian filmmaker

Marie-Hélène Viens is a Canadian filmmaker and screenwriter from Repentigny, Quebec, who works in partnership with her spouse Philippe Lupien. They are most noted for their 2024 film You Are Not Alone (Vous n'êtes pas seuls).

The film premiered in the Discovery program at the 2024 Toronto International Film Festival, where it received an honorable mention for the Best Canadian Discovery Award, and was subsequently shortlisted for the 2024 Jean-Marc Vallée DGC Discovery Award.

High school friends before becoming a couple, they collaborated on a number of short films prior to You Are Not Alone.

== Filmography ==
- Bernard the Great (Bernard le grand) - 2013
- Amen - 2016
- We Are the Freak Show (Nous sommes le freak show) - 2017
- You Are Not Alone (Vous n'êtes pas seuls) - 2024
