= Halima Elkhatabi =

Canadian filmmaker

Halima Elkhatabi is a Canadian filmmaker from Montreal, Quebec, most noted for her 2024 documentary film Living Together (Cohabiter),

A graduate of the Institut national de l'image et du son, her short films have included Nina, which was named to the Toronto International Film Festival's annual Canada's Top Ten list in 2015, and Fantas.

== Filmography ==
- Demain peut-être - 2009
- La Barricade - 2009
- La Tête contre le mur - 2010
- À St-Henri le 26 août - 2011
- Crée-moi, crée-moi pas - 2013, writer
- Nina - 2015
- Dounia and the Princess of Aleppo (Dounia et la princesse d'Alep) - 2022, cowriter
- Living Together (Cohabiter) - 2024
- Fantas - 2024
