= Cartoon d'or =

European award for animated short films

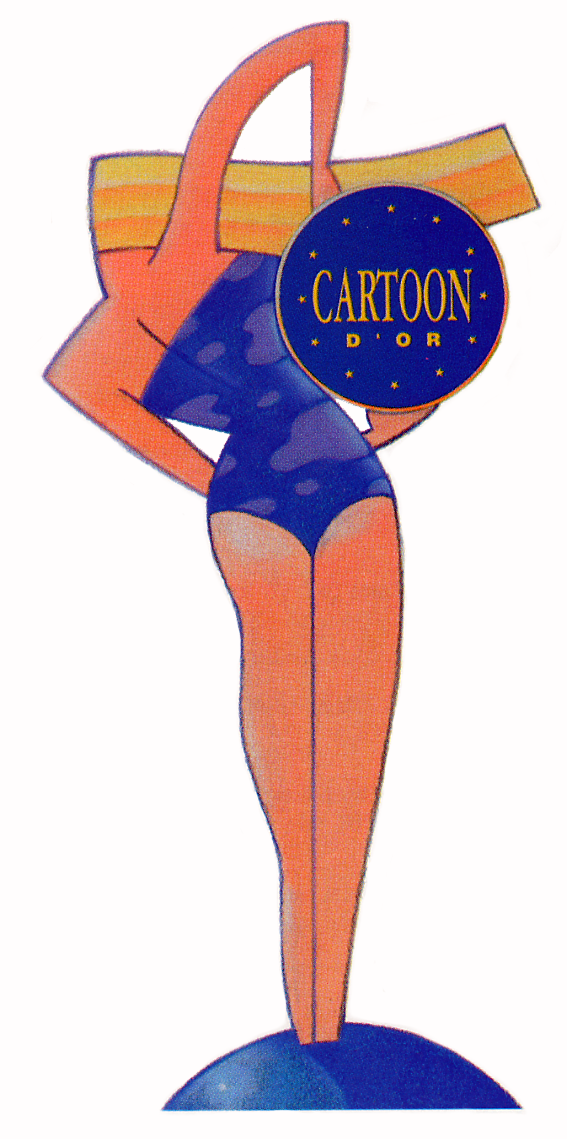
LogoCartoondOr

The Cartoon d'Or was a European award for animated short films.

== History ==
It was rewarded every year to the best European short film from Cartoon's partner festivals until it was suppressed in favor of the Emile Awards. Amongst this short list, a jury selects 5 films that will be screened during the Cartoon Forum (in order to promote 5 filmmakers each year) and one film will receive the Cartoon d'Or.

Created in 1991, the Cartoon d'Or used to be the only completely European animation prize until the final award was given to Gabriel Harel for Yùl and the Snake in 2016. The competition aimed to "promote the talents of European animation."

== Background ==
The Cartoon d'Or was created in order to nourish the European animation industry by work from creative filmmakers. European television series lacked of creativity to compete with programming on offer from the United States and Japan.

Moreover, although major financial support was being given to develop European animation, no special place was made for it at major European festivals and awards (Cannes Film Festival, Berlin, Venice, the European Felix etc.).

== The award ceremony ==
The award ceremony takes place during the Cartoon Forum which gathers all the players in the economic structure of European animation (700 professionals including 250 potential investors, 350 producers, 60 journalists and 40 public funding bodies). Consequently, the Cartoon Forum can act as a pipeline between short film makers and the industry. Indeed, the finalists are often approached by producers to work on series or feature films. Some finalists and prize-winners have themselves gone on to make series or feature films.

== List of winners ==
| Year | Title | Winner | Nationality | Length |
|---|---|---|---|---|
| 1991 | Creature Comforts | Nick Park | UK | 5' |
| 1992 | Manipulation | Daniel Greaves | UK | 6'20" |
| 1993 | The Village | Mark Baker | UK | 14' |
| 1994 | The Wrong Trousers | Nick Park | UK | 29' |
| | Os salteadores (special mention) | Abi Feijo | PT | 15' |
| 1995 | The Monk and the Fish | Michaël Dudok de Wit | FR | 6'20 |
| 1996 | Quest | Tyron Montgomery | DE | 12' |
| 1997 | The Old Lady and the Pigeons | Sylvain Chomet | FR | 23' |
| 1998 | L'enfant au grelot | Jacques-Rémy Girerd | FR | 26' |
| 1999 | Migrations | Constantin Chamski | FR | 4' |
| 2000 | A suspeita (The Suspect) | José Miguel Ribeiro | PT | 25' |
| 2001 | Father and Daughter | Michael Dudok de Wit | NL / BE / UK | 8'10" |
| 2002 | Home Road Movies | Robert Bradbrook | UK | 12'18" |
| 2003 | Sans queue, ni tête | Sandra Desmazières | FR | 6'35" |
| 2004 | Fast Film | Virgil Widrich | AUT / DE / LUX | 14' |
| 2005 | Jojo in the Stars | Marc Craste | UK | 12' |
| 2006 | Dreams and Desires - Family Ties | Joanna Quinn | UK | 9'50" |
| 2007 | The Pearce Sisters | Luis Cook | UK | 9'27" |
| 2008 | A Mouse's Tale | Benjamin Renner | FR | 4'10" |
| 2009 | Please Say Something | David OReilly | DE / IR | 10' |
| 2010 | Crocodile | Kaspar Jancis | EE | 17' |
| 2011 | Der Kleine und das Biest | Uwe Heidschötter, Johannes Weiland | DE | 6' |
| 2012 | Oh Willy... | Emma De Swaef, Marc James Roels | BE / FR / NL | 16:50 |
| 2013 | Head Over Heels | Tim Reckart & Fodhla Cronin O'Reilly | UK | 10'18" |
| 2014 | The Christmas Log (La bûche de Noël) | Stéphane Aubier & Vincent Patar | BE | 26' |
| 2015 | The Bigger Picture | Daisy Jacobs | UK | 7'30 |
| 2016 | Yùl and the Snake | Gabriel Harel | FR | 13'11" |

== See also ==
- Academy Award for Best Animated Short Film
- List of animation awards
