= Blaudzun =

Dutch singer-songwriter

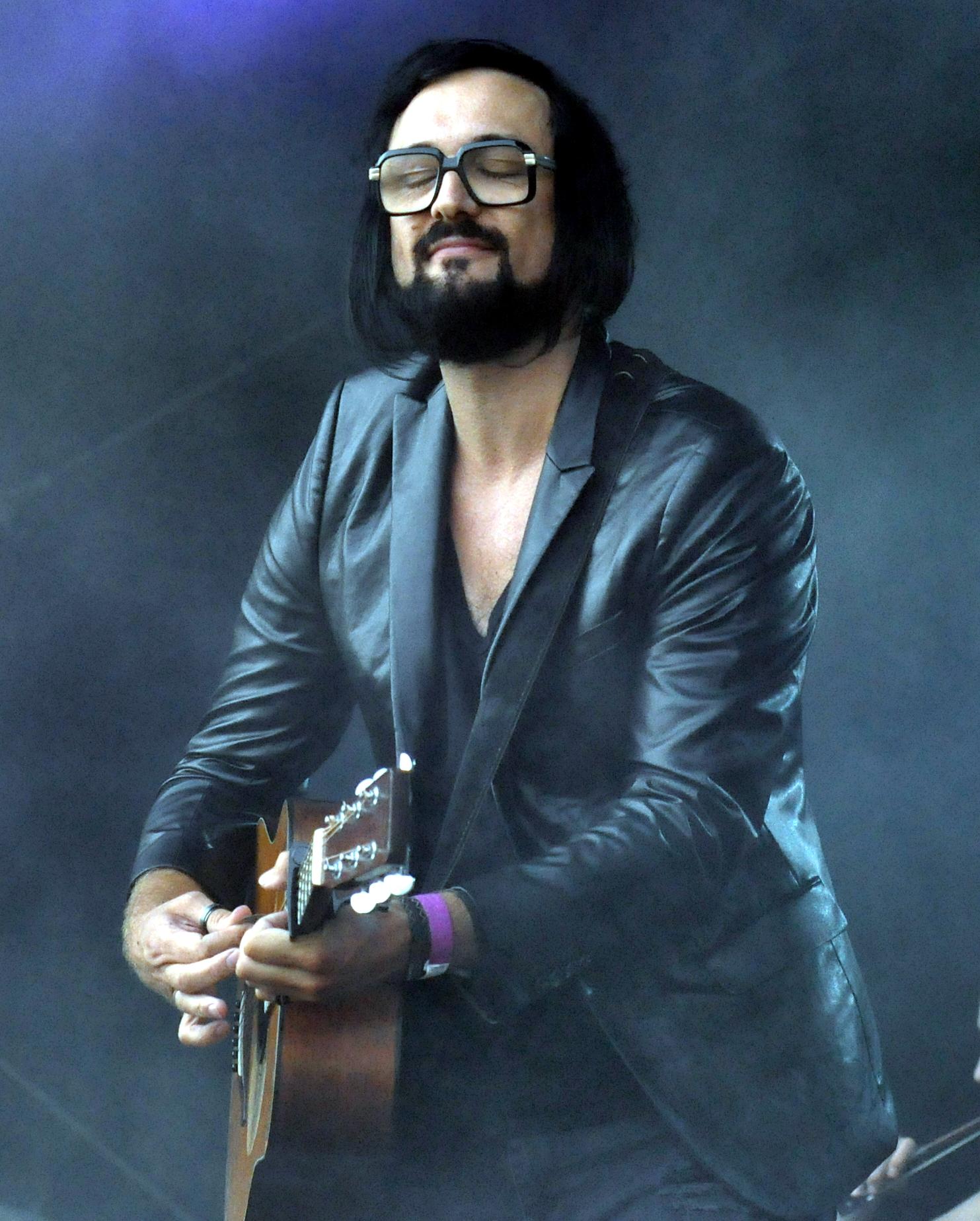
Blaudzun, 2014

Blaudzun is the stage name of the Dutch singer-songwriter Johannes Sigmond (Arnhem, Netherlands, 26 October 1974) who played for years in various bands and projects before pursuing a solo career in 2006.

== Career ==
Named Blaudzun, named after a relatively unknown Danish cyclist from the 70s, in 2007 he worked on a special collection of songs, originally intended to be a soundtrack for a midnight car drive. The first six songs came together as the self-released EP "Loveliesbleeding". He headed south to Barcelona to complete his self-titled debut that was released April 2008 on V2 Records Benelux. Blaudzun toured the Benelux countries in 2008 including Metropolis Festival and supported Norwegian singer Ane Brun and Mark Eitzel's American Music Club.

In September 2009 he finished recording Seadrift Soundmachine (V2 Benelux) during sessions with The City of Prague Orchestra, known for its film scores (Das Leben Der Anderen, and David Lynch' Lost Highway). Blaudzun again wrote most of the songs in his beloved Barcelona and recorded in different studios in the Netherlands and Prague. His second LP Seadrift Soundmachine was released on 12 February 2010. Blaudzun made big impressions that year at the big summer festivals in Holland, including into The Great Wide Open and Lowlands. He ended the year with a sold out club tour.

Blaudzun broke through in the Benelux and beyond with his third album Heavy Flowers (2012) which was released in The Netherlands, Belgium, Scandinavia and the US (Krian Music Group). This was followed by sold out club tours in both the Netherlands and Belgium, festivals in both Europe and the USA including Eurosonic/Noorderslag 2012, Dranouter, The Great Escape, Sziget, SXSW and Lowlands and winning awards such as the Dutch Public Broadcasting Award for Best Album of the Year 2012, an Edison for Best Male Artist at the Dutch Edison Awards and an award for Best Alternative Act at 3FM (Dutch national radio). The single "Flame on My Head" became an instant classic on Studio Brussel and hit both their Hotlist and the Afrekening Charts.

The album Promises of No Man's Land was released by V2 Benelux (Benelux & World) and Glitterhouse Records (Germany, Swiss, Austria) on 7 March 2014. The album entered the Dutch Album top 100 at No. 1 and entered the charts at No. 6 in Belgium. Promises of No Man's Land was also the title of the first single from the album and was the closing anthem of the daily Olympic program 'NOS Studio Sportwinter' in Sochi. The video was made by Kimmo Films and directed by Mirka Duijn & Nina Spiering. In April 2014 Blaudzun once again received an award for Best Alternative Act at 3FM. During the summer of 2014 he toured Europe with his band playing on festivals like Lowlands, Pukkelpop in Belgium, Hurricane & Southside in Germany and Bråvalla in Sweden. In the spring of 2015 his new single Powder Blue, the official title song for Dutch movie Ventoux, was released. Previously Blaudzun also composed the official anthem Bon Voyage! for the 2015 edition of the Tour de France that started in his hometown Utrech.

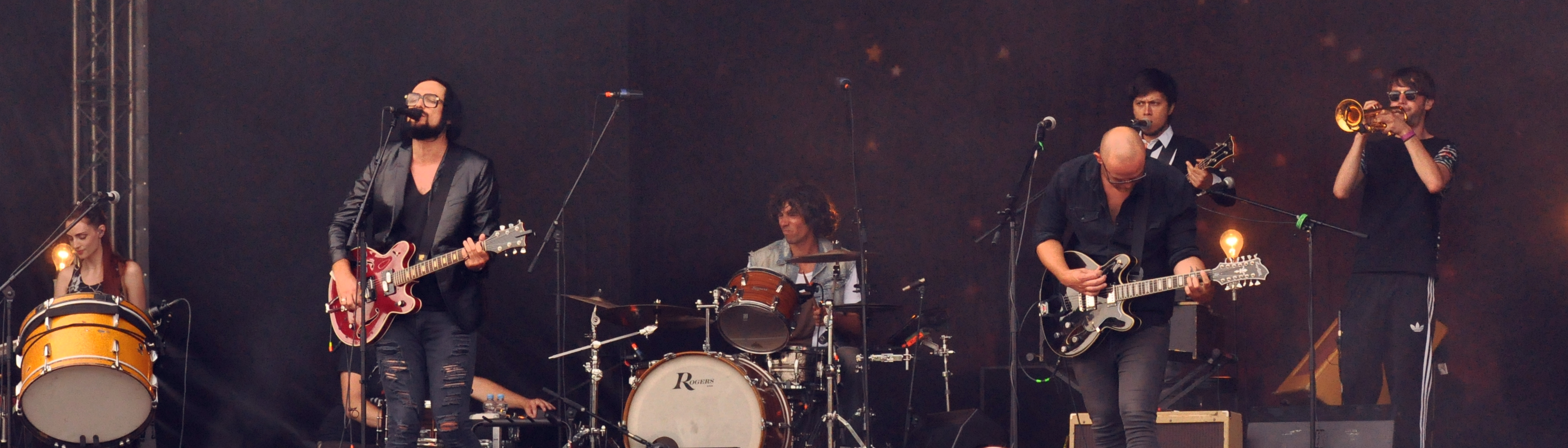
Blaudzun performing with his band, 2014

== Awards ==
- 3voor12 Award – Heavy Flowers – Best Album of the Year 2012
- Edison Award 2013 – Best Male Artist
- 3FM Award 2013 – Best Alternative Act
- 3FM Award 2014 – Best Alternative Act

== Discography ==
=== Albums ===
- Blaudzun (April 2008)
- Seadrift Soundmachine (12 February 2010)
- Heavy Flowers (9 January 2012 – European release; 29 January 2013 – US release)
- Promises of No Man's Land (7 March 2014)
- Jupiter, Pt. I (7 October 2016)
- Jupiter, Pt. II (3 March 2017)
- _UP_ (6 April 2018)
- Musik Ungeklärter Herkunft (Original Soundtrack) (13 December 2019)
- Lonely City Exit Wounds (21 January 2022)
- Latter Days (18 October 2024)
