= The Illusionist (soundtrack) =

The Illusionist: Music from the Motion Picture

Soundtrack album by various artists
- Released: 14 December 2010
- Recorded: 2010
- Length: 42:13
- Label: Milan
- Producer: Emmanuel Chamboredon; Jean-Christophe Chamboredon; Terry Davies; Stefan Karrer

Sylvain Chomet chronology
The Triplets of Belleville (2004)	The Illusionist: Music from the Motion Picture (2010)	Attila Marcel (2013)

The Illusionist: Music from the Motion Picture is the official soundtrack to the 2010 animated film The Illusionist. The album was released through Milan Records on 14 December 2010. The songs on the album were either orchestrated by the film's director, Sylvain Chomet, or performed by Malcolm Ross under the fictional band name The Britoons, with Leo Condie and Ian Stoddart. It was generally well received, with particular praise for the songs' storytelling and its "effortless" sound.

== Background and development ==
Bob Last, a co-producer of the film, introduced Chomet to Malcolm Ross, a Scottish musician who was previously a part of the band Josef K.

== Composition ==
The soundtrackIn "Chanson Illusionist", voice impersonations of Juliette Gréco, Les Frères Jacques, Georges Brassens, Barbara, Yves Montand, Édith Piaf, Jacques Brel, and Serge Gainsbourg are performed by an ensemble of voice actors.

== Critical reception ==
Professional ratings
Review scores
Source	Rating
AllMusic	3.5/5 stars

The soundtrack received generally positive reviews from music critics. William Ruhlmann from AllMusic claimed that the record was functional and "serve[d] the small-scale, melancholy treatment of the story" well. Tampa Bay Times' Steve Persall described the album as a "small marvel of music hall tunes" and congratulated Chomet for allowing the dialogue to be freely interpreted. According to Michael Phillips of the Chicago Tribune, the ending result is effortless and acclaimed the track "Chanson Illusionist" for being a "gentle waltz".

== Track listing ==
No.	Title	Writer(s)	Performer(s)	Length
1.	"Chanson Illusionist"	Sylvain Chomet	Chomet; Didier Gustin; Jil Aigrot; Frédéric Lebon	4:05
2.	"Paris London"	Chomet	Chomet	0:56
3.	"Military Opera"	Chomet	Chomet	0:25
4.	"Molly Jean"	Malcolm Ross	The Britoons	2:36
5.	"Love of Another Man"	Ross	The Britoons	1:57
6.	"My Girl Blue"	Ross	The Britoons	3:06
7.	"London Iona"	Chomet	Chomet	1:55
8.	"Iona Oban"	Chomet	Chomet	2:08
9.	"Oban Edinburgh"	Chomet	Chomet	0:52
10.	"Blue Dress"	Chomet	Chomet	0:33
11.	"Jenners"	Chomet	Chomet	1:52
12.	"Fakir"	Chomet	Chomet	3:06
13.	"The Clown"	Chomet	Chomet	3:09
14.	"City Lights"	Chomet	Chomet	3:45
15.	"North Sea"	Chomet	Chomet	3:22
16.	"Arthur's Seat"	Chomet	Chomet	1:07
17.	"Illusionist Finale"	Chomet	Chomet	7:19
Total length:				42:13

== Release history ==
Date	Format(s)	Label(s)	Ref.
14 December 2010	CD; digital download	Milan	
