= Chanson Illusionist =

Song by Sylvain Chomet

from the album The Illusionist: Music from the Motion Picture
- Released: 14 December 2010
- Recorded: 2010
- Genre: Waltz
- Length: 4:05
- Label: Warner Bros.; Milan
- Songwriter(s): Sylvain Chomet
- Producer(s): Terry Davies

"Chanson Illusionist" is a song recorded by French animator and musician Sylvain Chomet for the official soundtrack to the 2010 animated film, The Illusionist. It was distributed digitally on 14 December 2010 through Warner Bros. Records and Milan Records, along with the rest of the parent album. Chomet wrote the piece while Terry Davies conducted and arranged its production.

== Background and composition ==
"Chanson Illusionist" was written by Chomet while its orchestral production was handled by Terry Davies, who also conducted it. Acting as the composter, Chomet selected Isobel Griffiths and Lucy Whalley to handle the conduction of the accompanying orchestra while Sonia Slany led it, accompanied by a piano arrangement created by Gwilyn Simcock. In the recording, voice impersonations of Juliette Gréco, Les Frères Jacques, Georges Brassens, Barbara, Yves Montand, Édith Piaf, Jacques Brel, and Serge Gainsbourg are performed by an ensemble cast of voice actors. French impersonators Didier Gustin, Jil Aigrot, and Frédéric Lebon fulfilled the task over Chomet's original composition, with several of them each impersonating several of the aforementioned singers.

Lasting four minutes and five seconds, Michael Phillips of the Chicago Tribune, described the composition as a "gentle waltz".

== Critical reception ==
William Ruhlmann, of AllMusic and CD Universe, thanked Chomet for the French and Scottish musical influence apparent in the production. Specifically, Ruhlmann found it to be apparent and claimed that "the French aspect comes up right away". "Chanson Illusionist" was included on the official list of 41 contenders for the Academy Award for Best Original Song in 2010, but it ultimately did not receive a nomination.
