= Arvin Belarmino =

Filipino director (born 1987)

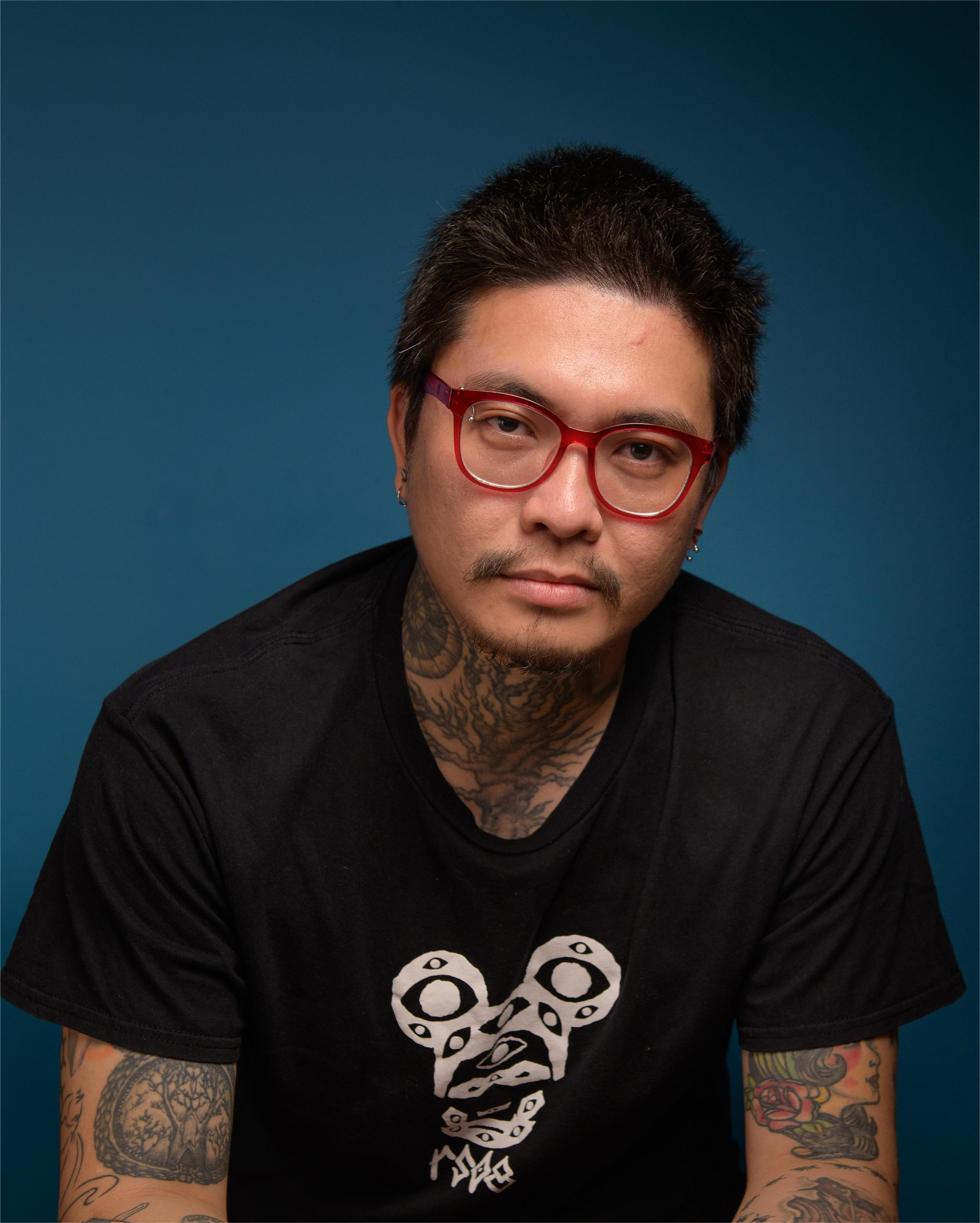
- Born: 1987 (age 38–39); Manila, Philippines
- Occupation: Director
- Years active: 2016–present
- Known for: Radikals, Ali, Ria, Agapito, Hinakdal
- Awards: Gawad Urian Award, Kaohsiung Film Festival, Toronto International Film Festival, El Gouna Film Festival

Arvin Alindogan Belarmino (born 1987) is a Filipino filmmaker. His debut feature project Ria was selected for the 2022 Festival de Cannes Cinéfondation La Résidence where it received the CNC Pitch Award. His short film Radikals (2024) was selected for La Semaine de la Critique (Critic's Week) competition at the 77th Cannes Film Festival and in the following year, the short drama Agapito premiered in the Short Film Palme d'Or competition at the 2025 Cannes Film Festival while the film Ali, written by him, got a special mention award during the latter.

== Career ==
Belarmino began his filmmaking career with short films including Nakaw (2016) and The Death of Pablo (2016).

He directed the experimental shorts Hinakdal in 2023 and Radikals in 2024.

In 2025, he co-directed with Kyla Danelle Romero the short drama Agapito, which premiered in the Short Film Palme d'Or competition at the 2025 Cannes Film Festival. In the same year, the film received an honorable mention in the 2025 Toronto International Film Festival for the Best International Short Film award.

In the same year, Variety announced Belarmino began production on his debut feature film, Ria, a punk drama set in Manila. The film follows Ria, an orphaned Filipina punk musician raised in a punk commune called Tarima. She attempts to protect the community from demolition and corruption while working as a housekeeper at the Oriental Hotel to help pay for the medical care of Olga, the commune's diabetic matriarch. Belarmino co-wrote the screenplay with Kyla Danelle Romero, with whom he had previously collaborated on Radikals and Agapito.

In June 2026, Belarmino was invited by Academy of Motion Picture Arts and Sciences, organizer of the annual Academy Awards, as a member of its Short Films Branch, becoming one of 529 artists and executives worldwide selected for the Academy's 2026 membership class.

In August 2026, Belarmino's debut feature film, Ria, was announced to premiere in the Vision–Asia section of the 31st Busan International Film Festival in October 2026. The film won the festival's Heart of Eurasia Award, announced on October 14 as part of the Busan Vision Awards.

== Early life ==
Belarmino was born in Masbate but spent most of his years in Manila. He developed an interest in films at the age of eight after his father began taking him to video stores.

== Education ==
Belarmino took up information technology in De La Salle University – Dasmariñas at Dasmariñas, Cavite.

== Filmography ==
Year	Title	Director	Writer	Notes
2016	Nakaw	Yes	Yes	Short; Co-directed by Noel Escondo
2016	The Death of Pablo	Yes	Yes	Short
2018	The Gathering	Yes	Yes	Short
2018	Shackles	Yes	Yes	Short
2020	Life's Pedal	Yes	Yes	Short
2023	Condemned	Yes	Yes	Short
2024	Radikals	Yes	Yes	Short
2024	Silig	Yes	Yes	Short; Co-directed with Rithy Lomorpich
2025	Agapito	Yes	Yes	Short; Co-directed with Kyla Danelle Romero
2025	Ali	No	Yes	Short
2026	Ria	Yes	Yes	Feature directorial debut

== Festival participation ==
Belarmino has participated in these film programs:

- Festival de Cannes: Cinéfondation residency (2022), short film selection (2025)
- Talents Tokyo
- Locarno Filmmakers Academy
- Produire Au Sud Nantes
- La Fabrique Cinéma
- Berlinale Talents
- Quinzaine des Cinéastes Factory Programme (2024)

== Collaborators ==
- Noel Escondo – Co-director of Nakaw
- Kyla Danelle Romero – Co-director of Agapito
- Kristine De Leon – Producer of Agapito
- John Angelo Diamos – Composer for Agapito
- Adnan Al Rajeev – Director Ali

== Recent work ==
Belarmino's short film Agapito premiered at the 2025 Cannes Film Festival. He participated in the 2024 Quinzaine des Cinéastes Factory Programme.
