= 2025 Cannes Film Festival =

- Official double poster designed by Hartland Villa featuring Anouk Aimée and Jean-Louis Trintignant embracing in A Man and a Woman (1966)
- Opening film: Leave One Day
- Location: Cannes, France
- Founded: 1946
- Awards: Palme d'Or: It Was Just an Accident
- Hosted by: Laurent Lafitte
- Artistic director: Thierry Frémaux
- No. of films: 22 (In Competition)
- Festival date: 13–24 May 2025
- Website: festival-cannes.com/en

Cannes Film Festival
- 2026 2024

The 78th annual Cannes Film Festival took place from 13 to 24 May 2025. French actress Juliette Binoche served as jury president for the main competition. Iranian filmmaker Jafar Panahi won the Palme d'Or, the festival's top prize, for the thriller film It Was Just an Accident.

Hartland Villa designed the official double poster for the festival featuring actress Anouk Aimée and actor Jean-Louis Trintignant in the movie A Man and a Woman (1966) by Claude Lelouch, winner of the Palme d'Or at the 19th Cannes Film Festival. French actor Laurent Lafitte served as host for the opening and closing ceremonies.

During the festival, two Honorary Palme d'Ors were awarded: the first was awarded to Robert De Niro during the festival's opening ceremony, and the second was awarded on short notice to Denzel Washington before the world premiere of Highest 2 Lowest.

One day after the announcement of the ACID official selection, Palestinian photojournalist Fatima Hassouna, one of the main subjects of the documentary film Put Your Soul on Your Hand and Walk by Sepideh Farsi, was killed along with ten members of her family in an Israeli airstrike on their home in Gaza City on 16 April 2025. The festival released an official statement expressing condolences and criticising the ongoing war and violence in Gaza. On the festival's opening day, more than 350 directors, actors and producers including, Jonathan Glazer, Nuri Bilge Ceylan, Víctor Erice, Hafsia Herzi, Aki Kaurismäki, Nadav Lapid, Kleber Mendonça Filho, Pedro Almodóvar, David Cronenberg and Ruben Östlund signed a letter condemning the killing of Hassouna and denounced the ongoing genocide in Gaza, stating: "We cannot remain silent while genocide is taking place in Gaza".

On the festival's final day, 24 May 2025, a power outage caused by arson disrupted the morning screenings sessions.

The festival opened with the French comedy film Leave One Day by Amélie Bonnin.

== Juries ==
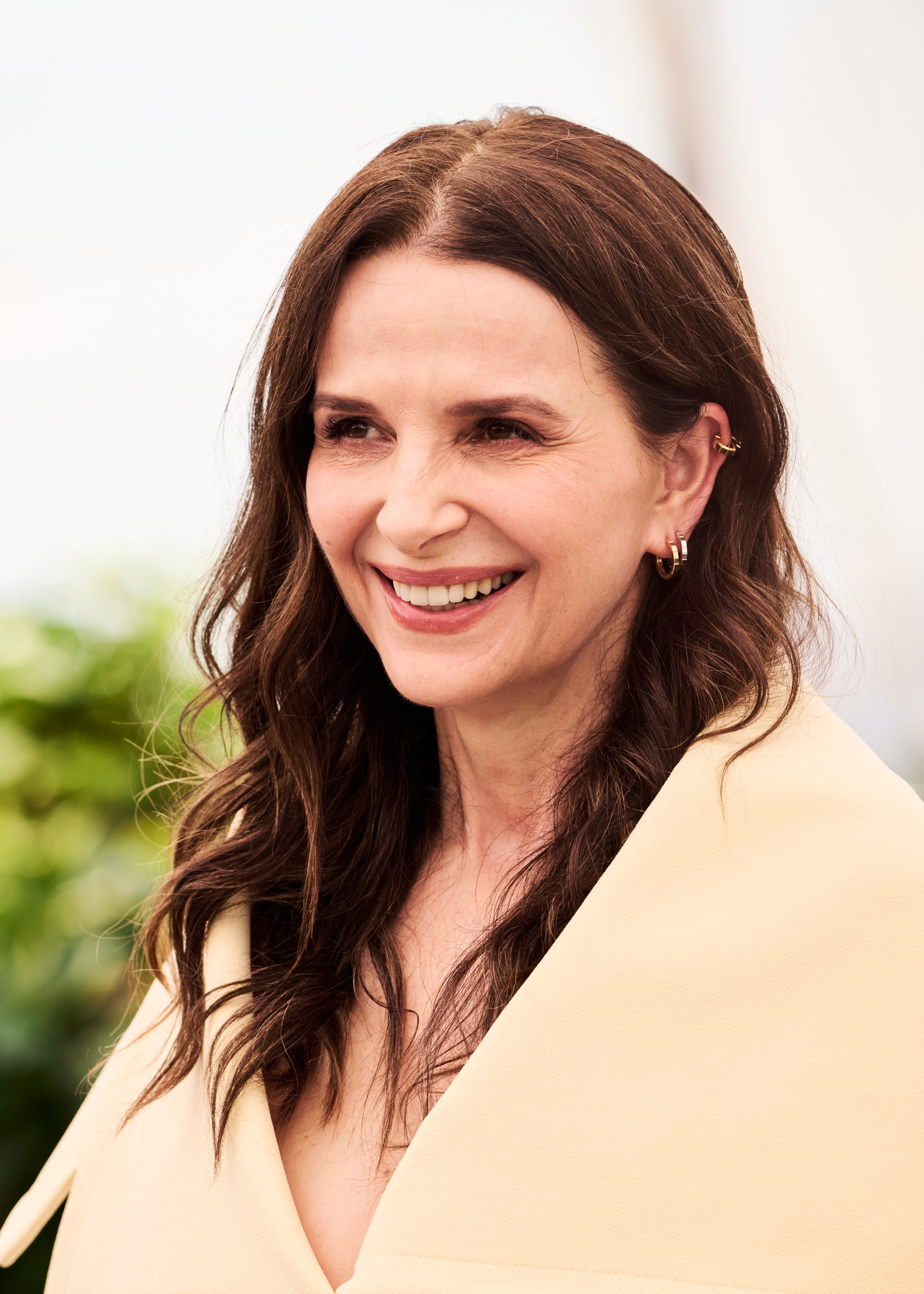
Juliette Binoche, Main Competition jury president

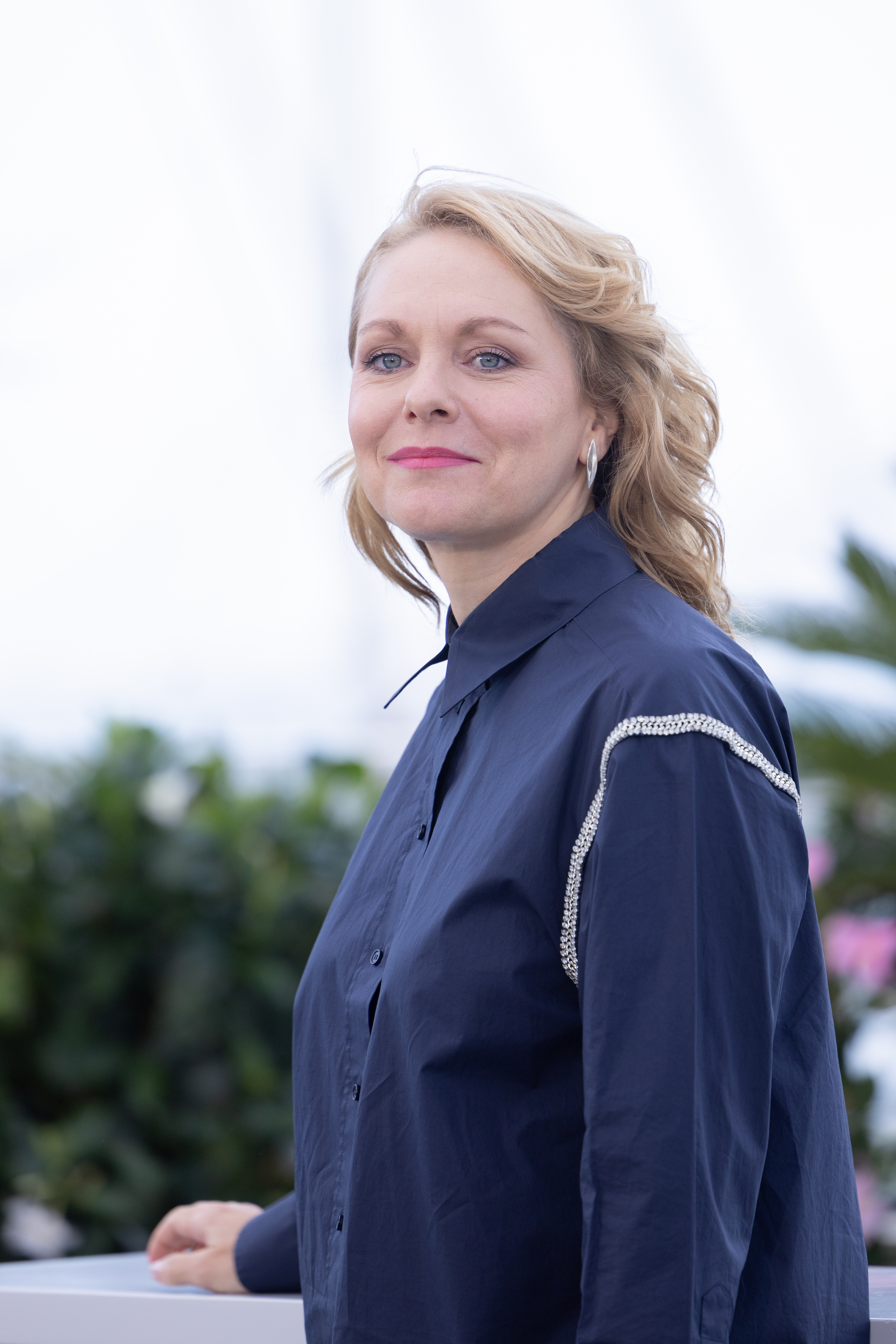
Maren Ade, Cinéfondation and Short Films Competition jury president

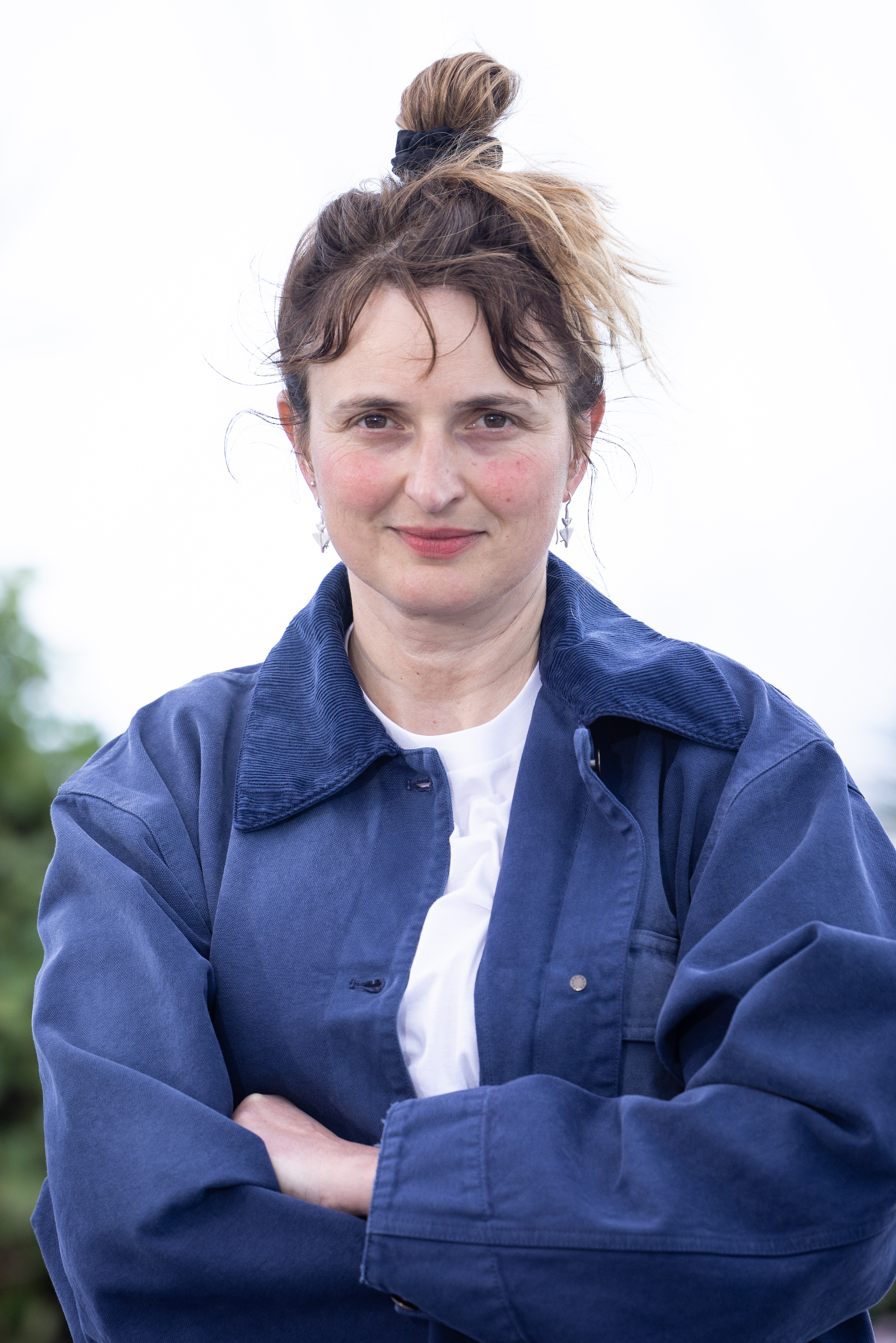
Alice Rohrwacher, Caméra d'Or jury president

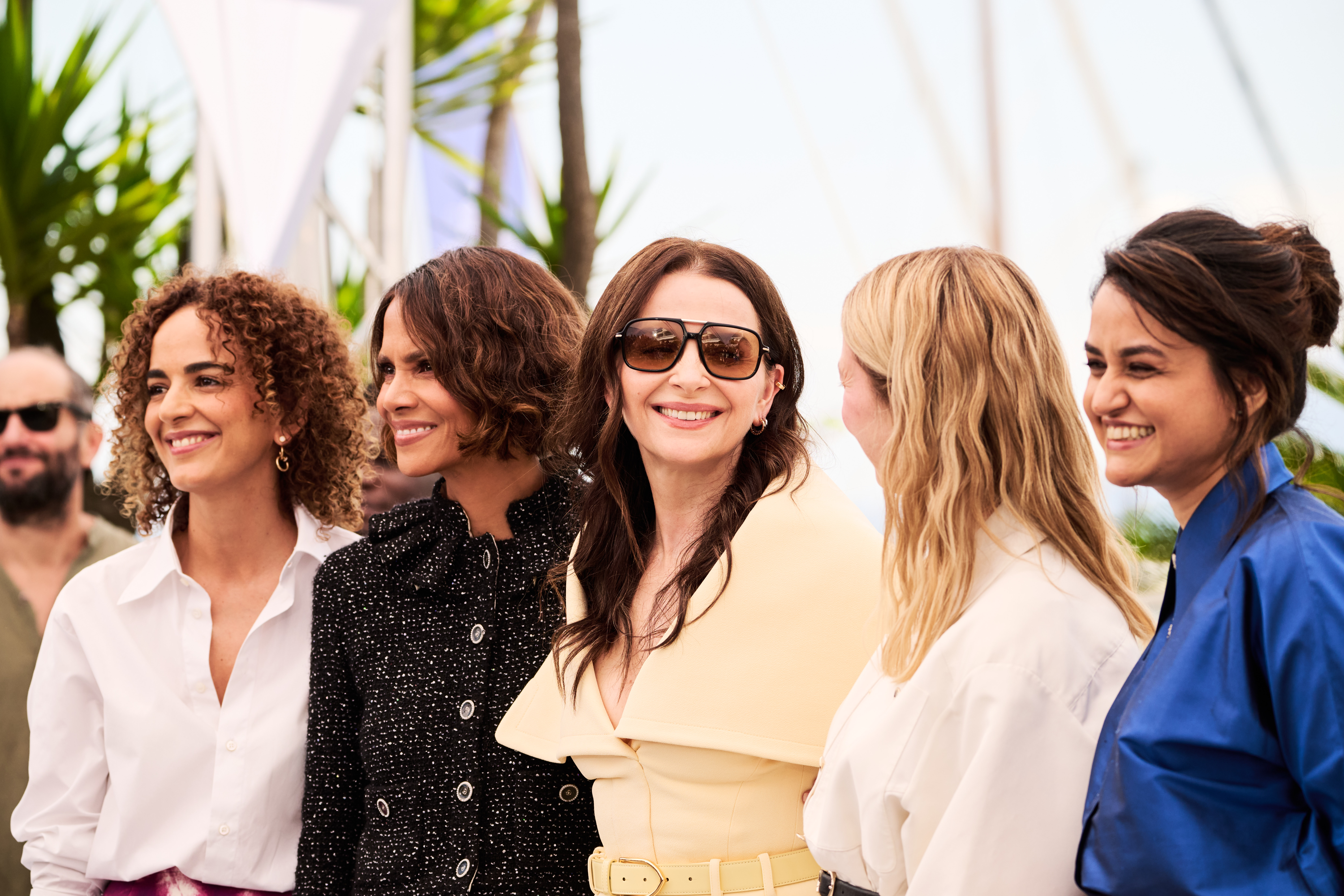
Main Competition jury members

=== Main Competition ===
- Juliette Binoche, French actress – Jury President
- Halle Berry, American actress and filmmaker
- Dieudo Hamadi, Congolese filmmaker and producer
- Hong Sang-soo, South Korean filmmaker
- Payal Kapadia, Indian filmmaker
- Carlos Reygadas, Mexican filmmaker
- Alba Rohrwacher, Italian actress
- Leïla Slimani, Moroccan writer
- Jeremy Strong, American actor

=== Un Certain Regard ===
- Molly Manning Walker, British filmmaker and cinematographer — Jury President
- Nahuel Pérez Biscayart, Argentine actor
- Louise Courvoisier, French filmmaker
- Vanja Kaluđerčić, Croatian film programmer and Festival Director of the International Film Festival Rotterdam
- Roberto Minervini, Italian filmmaker, producer and screenwriter

=== Cinéfondation and Short Films Competition ===
- Maren Ade, German filmmaker and producer — Jury President
- José Maria Prado Garcia, Spanish producer and former director of Filmoteca Española
- Reinaldo Marcus Green, American filmmaker and producer
- Camélia Jordana, French actress, singer and songwriter
- Nebojša Slijepčević, Croatian filmmaker

=== Caméra d'Or ===
- Alice Rohrwacher, Italian filmmaker – Jury President
- Rachid Hami, Algerian-French filmmaker and actor
- Frédéric Mercier, French film critic
- Géraldine Nakache, French filmmaker and actress
- Tommaso Vergallo, CEO Noir Luimere

=== Immersive Competition ===
- Luc Jacquet, French filmmaker – Jury President
- Laurie Anderson, American artist and musician
- Tania de Montaigne, French writer
- Martha Fiennes, British filmmaker and producer
- Tetsuya Mizuguchi, Japanese video game creator

=== L'Œil d'Or ===
- Julie Gayet, French actress and producer – Jury President
- Carmen Castillo, Chilean filmmaker
- Frédéric Maire, Swiss director of the Cinémathèque suisse
- Juliette Favreul Renaud, French producer
- Marc Zinga, Congolese-Belgian actor

=== Critics' Week ===
- Rodrigo Sorogoyen, Spanish filmmaker – Jury President
- Yulia Evina Bhara, Indonesian producer
- Jihane Bougrine, Moroccan journalist
- Josée Deshaies, French-Canadian cinematographer
- Daniel Kaluuya, British actor and filmmaker

=== Queer Palm ===
- Christophe Honoré, French filmmaker – Jury President
- Marcelo Caetano, Brazilian filmmaker
- Faridah Gbadamosi, American film programmer
- Léonie Pernet, French composer and singer
- Timé Zoppé, French journalist

== Official Selection ==
=== In Competition ===
The following films were selected to compete for the Palme d'Or:

| English Title | Original Title | Director(s) | Production Country |
|---|---|---|---|
| Alpha (QP) | | Julia Ducournau | France, Belgium |
| Case 137 | Dossier 137 | Dominik Moll | France |
| Die My Love | | Lynne Ramsay | United States |
| Eagles of the Republic | | Tarik Saleh | Sweden, France, Denmark, Finland |
| Eddington | | Ari Aster | United States |
| Fuori | | Mario Martone | Italy, France |
| The History of Sound (QP) | | Oliver Hermanus | United Kingdom, United States |
| It Was Just an Accident | یک تصادف ساده | Jafar Panahi | Iran, France, Luxembourg |
| The Little Sister (QP) | La Petite Dernière | Hafsia Herzi | France, Germany |
| The Mastermind | | Kelly Reichardt | United States, United Kingdom |
| Nouvelle Vague | | Richard Linklater | France |
| The Phoenician Scheme | | Wes Anderson | United States, Germany |
| Renoir | ルノワール | Chie Hayakawa | Japan, Australia, France, Singapore, Philippines, Indonesia |
| Resurrection | 狂野时代 | Bi Gan | China, France |
| Romería | | Carla Simón | Spain, Belgium, Germany |
| The Secret Agent | O Agente Secreto | Kleber Mendonça Filho | Brazil, France, Germany, Netherlands |
| Sentimental Value | Affeksjonsverdi | Joachim Trier | Norway, France, Germany, Denmark, Sweden, United Kingdom |
| Sirāt | | Oliver Laxe | Spain, France |
| Sound of Falling | In die Sonne schauen | Mascha Schilinski | Germany |
| Two Prosecutors | Два прокурора | Sergei Loznitsa | Latvia, France, Germany, Netherlands, Romania, Lithuania |
| Woman and Child | زن و بچه | Saeed Roustayi | Iran, France, Germany |
| Young Mothers | Jeunes mères | Jean-Pierre and Luc Dardenne | Belgium, France |

(QP) indicates film in competition for the Queer Palm.

=== Un Certain Regard ===
The following films were selected to compete in the Un Certain Regard section:

| English Title | Original Title | Director(s) | Production Country |
|---|---|---|---|
| Aisha Can't Fly Away (CdO) | عائشة لم تعد قادرة على الطيران | Morad Mostafa | Egypt, Sudan, Tunisia, Saudi Arabia, Qatar |
| Caravan (CdO) | Karavan | Zuzana Kirchnerová | Czech Republic, Slovakia, Italy |
| The Chronology of Water (CdO) | | Kristen Stewart | France, Latvia, United Kingdom, United States |
| Eleanor the Great (CdO) | | Scarlett Johansson | United States |
| The Great Arch | L’inconnu de la Grande Arche | Stéphane Demoustier | France |
| Heads or Tails? | Testa o croce? | Matteo Zoppis and Alessio Rigo de Righi | Italy, United States |
| Homebound | | Neeraj Ghaywan | India |
| I Only Rest in the Storm (QP) | O Riso e a Faca | Pedro Pinho | Portugal, Brazil, France, Romania |
| The Last One for the Road | Le città di pianura | Francesco Sossai | Italy |
| Love Me Tender (QP) | | Anna Cazenave Cambet | France |
| Meteors | Météors | Hubert Charuel | France |
| My Father's Shadow (CdO) | | Akinola Davies Jr. | United Kingdom, Ireland, Nigeria |
| The Mysterious Gaze of the Flamingo (CdO, QP) | La misteriosa mirada del flamenco | Diego Céspedes | Chile, France, Germany, Spain, Belgium |
| Once Upon a Time in Gaza | | Tarzan and Arab Nasser | Palestine, France, Portugal |
| A Pale View of Hills | 遠い山なみの光 | Kei Ishikawa | Japan, United Kingdom, Poland |
| Pillion (CdO) (QP) | | Harry Lighton | United Kingdom, Ireland |
| The Plague (CdO) | | Charlie Polinger | Romania, United States |
| Promised Sky (opening film) | Promis le ciel | Erige Sehiri | Tunisia, France, Netherlands, Qatar |
| A Poet | Un Poeta | Simón Mesa Soto | Colombia, Germany, Sweden |
| Urchin (CdO) | | Harris Dickinson | United Kingdom |

(CdO) indicates film eligible for the Caméra d'Or as a feature directorial debut.
(QP) indicates film in competition for the Queer Palm.

=== Out of Competition ===
The following films were selected to be screened out of competition:

| English Title | Original Title | Director(s) | Production Country |
|---|---|---|---|
| 13 Days, 13 Nights | 13 Jours, 13 Nuits | Martin Bourboulon | Belgium, France |
| Colours of Time | La Venue de l'avenir | Cédric Klapisch | France |
| Highest 2 Lowest | | Spike Lee | United States, Japan |
| Leave One Day (opening film) (CdO) | Partir un jour | Amélie Bonnin | France |
| Mission: Impossible – The Final Reckoning | | Christopher McQuarrie | United States |
| A Private Life | Vie privée | Rebecca Zlotowski | France |
| The Richest Woman in the World (QP) | La femme la plus riche du monde | Thierry Klifa | France, Belgium |
Midnight Screenings
| Exit 8 | 8番出口 | Genki Kawamura | Japan |
| Honey Don't! | | Ethan Coen | United States, United Kingdom |
| No One Will Know | Le Roi Soleil | Vincent Maël Cardona | France |
| The Residence | Dalloway | Yann Gozlan | France, Belgium |
| Sons of the Neon Night | 風林火山 | Juno Mak | Hong Kong |

(CdO) indicates film eligible for the Caméra d'Or as a feature directorial debut.
(QP) indicates film in competition for the Queer Palm.

=== Cannes Premiere ===
The following films were selected to be screened in the Cannes Premiere section:

| English Title | Original Title | Director(s) | Production Country |
|---|---|---|---|
| Amrum | | Fatih Akin | Germany |
| Connemara | | Alex Lutz | France |
| The Disappearance of Josef Mengele | Das Verschwinden des Josef Mengele | Kirill Serebrennikov | Germany, France, United Kingdom, Spain |
| Love on Trial | 恋愛裁判 | Koji Fukada | Japan, France |
| The Love That Remains | Ástin Sem Eftir Er | Hlynur Pálmason | Iceland, Denmark, France, Finland, Sweden |
| Magellan | Magalhães | Lav Diaz | Portugal, Spain, Philippines, France |
| Orwell: 2+2=5 (ŒdO) | | Raoul Peck | France, United States |
| Splitsville | | Michael Angelo Covino | United States |
| Summer Beats | Ma frère | Lise Akoka and Romane Gueret | France |
| The Wave (QP) | La ola | Sebastián Lelio | Chile, United States |

(ŒdO) indicates film eligible for the L'Œil d'or as documentary.
(QP) indicates film in competition for the Queer Palm.

=== Special Screenings ===
The following films were selected to be screened in the Special Screenings section:

| English Title | Original Title | Director(s) | Production Country |
|---|---|---|---|
| Arco (CdO) | | Ugo Bienvenu | France |
| Bono: Stories of Surrender (ŒdO) | | Andrew Dominik | Australia, United States |
| Little Amélie or the Character of Rain (CdO) | Amélie et la Métaphysique des Tubes | Maïlys Vallade and Liane-Cho Han | France |
| A Magnificent Life | Marcel et Monsieur Pagnol | Sylvain Chomet | France, Canada, Belgium, Luxembourg, United States |
| Mama (CdO) | | Or Sinai | Israel, Poland, Italy |
| The Six Billion Dollar Man (ŒdO) | | Eugene Jarecki | United States, Germany, France |
| Tell Her That I Love Her | Dites-lui que je l'aime | Romane Bohringer | France |
| The Wonderers (CdO) | Qui Brille au Combat | Joséphine Japy | France |
Tribute to Pierre Richard
| The Man Who Saw The Bear | L’Homme qui a vu l’Ours qui a vu l’Homme | Pierre Richard | France |

(CdO) indicates film eligible for the Caméra d'Or as a feature directorial debut.
(ŒdO) indicates film eligible for the L'Œil d'or as documentary.

=== Short Films Competition ===
Selected from 4,781 films, 9 are fiction short films and 2 animated short films. The following short films were selected to compete for the Short Film Palme d'Or:

| English Title | Original Title | Director(s) | Production Country |
|---|---|---|---|
| Agapito | | Arvin Belarmino and Kyla Danelle Romero | Philippines |
| Ali | | Adnan Al Rajeev | Bangladesh, Philippines |
| Arguments in Favor of Love | | Gabriel Abrantes | Portugal |
| Dammen | | Grégoire Graesslin | France |
| Fille de l’Eau | | Sandra Desmazières | France |
| I'm Glad You're Dead Now | | Tawfeek Barhom | Palestine, France, Greece |
| Hypersensitive | Hypersensible | Martine Froissard | Canada |
| Lili | 女孩 | Zhaoguang Luo and Shuhan Liao | China |
| The Loneliness of Lizards | A Solidão dos Lagartos | Inês Nunes | Portugal, Spain |
| The Spectacle | | Bálint Kenyeres | Hungary, France |
| Vultures | Aasvoëls | Dian Weys | South Africa, France |

=== Cinéfondation ===
The Cinéfondation (or La Cinéf) section focuses on films made by students at film schools. The Cannes Film Festival allocates a €15,000 grant for the winner of the First Prize, €11,250 for the winner of the Second Prize and €7,500 for the winner of the Third Prize. 13 live-action and 3 animated films from 2,700 submitted by film schools all over the world were selected:

| English Title | Original Title | Director(s) | School |
|---|---|---|---|
| 12 Moments Before the Flag-Raising Ceremony | 升旗手 | Qu Zhizheng | Beijing Film Academy, China |
| A Doll Made Up of Clay | | Kokob Gebrehaweria Tesfay | Satyajit Ray Film and Television Institute, India |
| Bimo | | Oumnia Hanader | CinéFabrique, France |
| The Bird from Within | O Pássaro de Dentro | Laura Anahory | Escola das Artes - UCP, Portugal |
| Ether | | Vida Skerk | NFTS, United Kingdom |
| First Summer | 첫여름 | Heo Gayoung | KAFA, South Korea |
| The Land of Slumber | Le Continent Somnambule | Jules Vésigot-Wahl | La Fémis, France |
| The Lightning Rod | Matalapaine | Helmi Donner | Aalto University, Finland |
| Maybe in March | Maske i Marts | Mikkel Bjørn Kehlert | Super16, Denmark |
| Milk and Cookies | Fursecuri si Lapte | Andrei Tache-Codreanu | UNATC “I. L. Caragiale”, Romania |
| My Grandmother is a Skydiver | | Polina Piddubna | Filmuniversität Babelsberg Konrad Wolf, Germany |
| Ginger Boy (Separated) | ジンジャーボーイ | Miki Tanaka | ENBU Seminar, Japan |
| The Sorceress Echo | Per Bruixa i Merzinera | Marc Camardons | ESCAC, Spain |
| Talk Me (QP) | | Joecar Hanna | NYU, United States |
| Three | Tres | Juan Ignacio Ceballos | UCINE, Argentina |
| Winter in March | | Natalia Mirzoyan | Estonian Academy of Arts, Estonia |

=== Cannes Classics ===
A restored 4K version of Charlie Chaplin's classic silent comedy The Gold Rush (1925) opened the Cannes Classics section, celebrating the 100 years of its release, while a restored 4K version of Stanley Kubrick classic epic Barry Lyndon (1975) closed the section on May 23. The following films were selected to be screened:

| English Title | Original Title | Director(s) | Production Country |
Restored Prints
| Amores perros (2000) | | Alejandro González Iñárritu | Mexico |
| The Arch (1968) | 董夫人 | T’ang Shushuen | Hong Kong |
| Barry Lyndon (1975) (closing film) | | Stanley Kubrick | United Kingdom, United States |
| Beyond Oblivion (1955) | Más allá del olvido | Hugo del Carril | Argentina |
| La Course en tête (1974) | | Joël Santoni | France, Belgium |
| Days and Nights in the Forest (1970) | Araṇyēra Dinarātri | Satyajit Ray | India |
| Dogma (1999) | | Kevin Smith | United States |
| Floating Clouds (1955) | 浮雲 | Mikio Naruse | Japan |
| Gehenu Lamai (1978) | ගැහැණු ළමයි | Sumitra Peries | Sri Lanka |
| The Gold Rush (1925) (opening film) | | Charlie Chaplin | United States |
| Hard Boiled (1992) | 辣手神探 | John Woo | Hong Kong |
| Magirama (1956) | | Abel Gance and Nelly Kaplan | France |
| Merlusse (1935) | | Marcel Pagnol | France |
| One Flew Over the Cuckoo's Nest (1975) | | Miloš Forman | United States |
| La Paga (1962) | | Ciro Durán | Colombia, Venezuela |
| Saeed Effendi (1955) | سعيد أفندي | Kameran Hosni | Iraq |
| Stars (1959) | Sterne | Konrad Wolf | East Germany, Bulgaria |
| Sunshine (1999) | | István Szabó | Germany, Hungary, Austria, Canada |
| Yi Yi (2000) | 一一 | Edward Yang | Taiwan, Japan |
World Cinema Project
| Chronicle of the Years of Fire (1975) | وقائع سنين الجمر | Mohammed Lakhdar-Hamina | Algeria |
Tributes
| Comanche Territory (1950) | | George Sherman | United States |
| The One I Loved | Moi qui t’aimais | Diane Kurys | France |
| Red Canyon (1949) | | George Sherman | United States |
Documentaries about Cinema
| Being Bo Widerberg (CdO, ŒdO) | I huvudet på Bo | Jon Asp and Mattias Nohrborg | Sweden |
| I Love Peru (CdO, ŒdO) | | Raphaël Quenard and Hugo David | France |
| My Mom Jayne (ŒdO) | | Mariska Hargitay | United States |
| Slauson Rec (ŒdO) | | Leo Lewis O'Neil | United States |
| To Vigo I Go (ŒdO) | Para Vigo me Voy! | Lírio Ferreira and Karen Harley | Brazil |
| Watch What You Say (ŒdO) | Dis pas de bêtises! | Vincent Glenn | France |
| Welcome to Lynchland (ŒdO) | David Lynch, une énigme à Hollywood | Stéphane Ghez | France |

(CdO) indicates film eligible for the Caméra d'Or as a feature directorial debut.
(ŒdO) indicates film eligible for the L'Œil d'or as documentary.

=== Cinéma de la Plage ===
The Cinéma de la Plage section line-up includes classics films, commemorations and world premieres of new productions at the Cannes' Plage Macé. The following films were selected to be screened:

| English Title | Original Title | Director(s) | Production Country |
|---|---|---|---|
| Ange | | Tony Gatlif | France |
| Bardot | | Alain Berliner | France, Belgium |
| A Hidden Life (2019) | | Terrence Malick | United States, Germany, Austria |
| The Legend of the Palme d’Or Continues | La Légende de la Palme d'Or... Continue | Alexis Veller | France |
Restored Prints
| Angel's Egg (1985) | 天使のたまご | Mamoru Oshii | Japan |
| Any Number Can Win (1963) | Mélodie en sous-sol | Henri Verneuil | France, Italy |
| Darling (1965) | | John Schlesinger | United Kingdom |
| Duel in the Sun (1946) | | King Vidor | United States |
| Hard Boiled (1992) | 辣手神探 | John Woo | Hong Kong |
| Naked Autumn (1961) | Les Mauvais Coups | François Leterrier | France |
| Red Wood Pigeon (1989) | Palombella Rossa | Nanni Moretti | Italy |
| Sunset Boulevard (1950) | | Billy Wilder | United States |

=== Immersive Competition ===
For the second year Immersive Competition, nine immersive works were selected for the competition, while seven productions will be featured as out of the competition. All the works at the exhibition will explore the evolution of the medium and drawing parallels between virtual reality, virtual production, cinema and collective storytelling. The following films were selected to be screened:

| English title | Original title | Director(s) | Production country |
In Competition
| Beyond the Vivid Unknown | | John Fitzgerald and Godfrey Reggio | United States |
| The Exploring Girl VR | | Caroline Poggi and Jonathan Vinel | France, Greece |
| Fillos do Vento: A Rapa | | Brais Revalderia and María Fernanda Ordóñez Morla | Spain, United States |
| From Dust | | Michel van der Aa | Netherlands |
| In the Current of Being | | Cameron Kostopoulos | United States, France |
| Lacuna | | Maartje Wegdam and Nienke Huitenga-Broeren | Netherlands |
| Lili | | Navid Khonsari | United States, United Kingdom, France |
| Taxi | | Yamil Rodriguez, Michael Arcos and Stephen Henderson | United Kingdom |
| La Maison de poupée | | Caroline Poggi and Jonathan Vinel | Luxembourg, Canada |
Out of Competition
| Chez moi | | Victoria Yakubova and Frédéric Le Louët | France |
| Trailblazer | | Eloise Singer | United Kingdom |
Focus
| Battlefield | | François Vautier | France, Luxembourg, Belgium |
| Ceci est mon cœur | | Nicolas Blies and Stéphane Hueber-Blies | Luxembourg, France, Canada |
| Floating with Spirits | | Juanita Onzaga | Belgium, Luxembourg, Netherlands |
| Ito Meikyu | | Boris Labbé | France, Luxembourg |
| Oto's Planet | | Gwenael François | Luxembourg, Canada, France |

== Parallel sections ==
=== Critics' Week (Semaine de la critique) ===
The Critics' Week is a parallel selection dedicated to first and second films. Laura Wandel's second feature film Adam's Interest opened the section on 14 May, while Momoko Seto's Dandelion's Odyssey closed the section. The following films were selected to be screened in competition:

| English Title | Original Title | Director(s) | Production Country |
In Competition
| A Useful Ghost (CdO, QP) | ผีใช้ได้ค่ะ | Ratchapoom Boonbunchachoke | Thailand, France, Singapore, Germany |
| Imago (ŒdO) | | Déni Oumar Pitsaev | France, Belgium |
| Kika | | Alexe Poukine | Belgium, France |
| Left-Handed Girl | 左撇子女孩 | Shih-Ching Tsou | Taiwan, France, United States, United Kingdom |
| Nino (CdO) | | Pauline Loquès | France |
| Reedland (CdO) | Rietland | Sven Bresser | Netherlands, Belgium |
| Sleepless City (CdO) | Ciudad sin sueño | Guillermo Galoe | Spain, France |
Special Screenings
| Adam's Interest (opening film) | L'intérêt d'Adam | Laura Wandel | Belgium, France |
| Baise-en-ville | | Martin Jauvat | France |
| Dandelion's Odyssey (closing film) (CdO) | Planètes | Momoko Seto | France, Belgium |
| Love Letters (CdO) (QP) | Des preuves d’amour | Alice Douard | France |
Short Films Competition
| Alișveriș | | Vasile Todinca | Romania |
| Bleat! (QP) | கத்து! | Ananth Subramaniam | Malaysia, Philippines, France |
| Critical Condition | КРИТИЧНЕ СТАНОВИЩЕ | Mila Zhluktenko | Germany |
| Erogenesis (QP) | | Xandra Popescu | Germany |
| Free Drum Kit | Donne Batterie | Carmen Leroi | France |
| Glasses | 안경 | Yumi Joung | South Korea |
| God is Shy | Dieu est timide | Jocelyn Charles | France |
| The Mine | L'mina | Randa Maroufi | Morocco, France, Italy, Qatar |
| Samba Infinito | | Leonardo Martinelli | Brazil, France |
| Wonderwall | | Róisín Burns | United Kingdom, France |
Special Screenings - Short Films
| Eraserhead in a Knitted Shopping Bag | Eraserhead dans un Filet à Provisions | Lili Koss | France, Bulgaria |
| No Skate! | | Guil Sela | France |
| To the Woods | Une Fugue | Agnès Patron | France |

(CdO) indicates film eligible for the Caméra d'Or as a feature directorial debut.
(ŒdO) indicates film eligible for the L'Œil d'or as documentary.
(QP) indicates film in competition for the Queer Palm.

=== Directors' Fortnight (Quinzaine des cinéastes) ===
For the second year, in partnership with Fondation Chantal Akerman, the Audience Award was given by popular vote, alongside €7,500 to the director of the winning feature. The following films were selected to be screened in the Directors' Fortnight (Quinzaine des cinéastes) section:

| English Title | Original Title | Director(s) | Production Country |
Feature films
| Brand New Landscape (CdO) | 見はらし世代 | Yuiga Danzuka | Japan, France |
| Dangerous Animals | | Sean Byrne | Australia |
| Death Does Not Exist | La mort n'existe pas | Félix Dufour-Laperrière | Canada, France |
| Enzo (opening film) (QP) | | Robin Campillo | France, Italy, Belgium |
| The Girl in the Snow (CdO) | L'Engloutie | Louise Hémon | France |
| Girl on Edge (CdO) | 花漾少女杀人事件 | Jinghao Zhou | China |
| The Girls We Want (CdO) | Les filles désir | Prïncia Car | France |
| Her Will Be Done (QP) | Que ma volonté soit faite | Julia Kowalski | France, Poland |
| Kokuho | 国宝 | Lee Sang-il | Japan |
| Lucky Lu (CdO) | | Lloyd Lee Choi | United States, Canada |
| Militantropos (ŒdO) | Мілітантропос | Yelizaveta Smith, Alina Gorlova and Simon Mozgovyi | Ukraine, France, Austria |
| Miroirs No. 3 | | Christian Petzold | Germany |
| The Party's Over! | Classe moyenne | Antony Cordier | France, Belgium |
| Peak Everything | Amour Apocalypse | Anne Émond | Canada |
| The President's Cake (CdO) | مملكة القصب | Hasan Hadi | Iraq, Qatar, United States |
| Sorry, Baby (closing film, CdO, QP) | | Eva Victor | United States |
| Untamable | Indomptables | Thomas Ngijol | Cameroon, France |
| Wild Foxes (CdO) | La danse des renards | Valéry Carnoy | France, Belgium |
| Yes | כן! | Nadav Lapid | Israel, France, Germany, Cyprus, United Kingdom |
Short Films
| +10k | | Gala Hernández López | France, Spain |
| Before the Sea Forgets (QP) | | Ngọc Duy Lê | Singapore |
| Blue Heart | Cœur bleu | Samuel Suffren | Haiti, France |
| The Body | | Louris van de Geer | Australia |
| Bread Will Walk | Le pain se lève | Alex Boya | Canada |
| Death of the Fish | La mort du poisson | Eva Lusbaronian | France |
| Karmash | کرمش | Aleem Bukhari | Pakistan |
| Loynes | | Dorian Jespers | Belgium, France, North Macedonia, United Kingdom |
| Nervous Energy | 兩個女導演 | Eve Liu | United States |
| When the Geese Flew | | Arthur Gay | New Zealand |

(CdO) indicates film eligible for the Caméra d'Or as a feature directorial debut.
(ŒdO) indicates film eligible for the L'Œil d'or as documentary.
(QP) indicates film in competition for the Queer Palm.

=== ACID ===
The following films were selected to be screened in the ACID (Association for the Distribution of Independent Cinema) section, consisting of six fiction features and 3 documentaries:

| English Title | Original Title | Director(s) | Production Country |
|---|---|---|---|
| L'aventura | | Sophie Letourneur | France |
| The Black Snake | La Couleuvre Noire | Aurélien Vernhes-Lermusiaux | France, Colombia, Brazil |
| Drifting Laurent (QP) | Laurent dans le Vent | Anton Balekdjian, Léo Couture and Mattéo Eustachon | France |
| Drunken Noodles (QP) | | Lucio Castro | United States, Argentina |
| Entroncamento | | Pedro Cabeleira | Portugal, France |
| A Light That Never Goes Out (CdO) | Jossain on valo joka ei sammu | Lauri-Matti Parppei | Finland, Norway |
| Life After Siham (ŒdO) | La Vie Après Siham | Namir Abdel Messeeh | France, Egypt |
| Obscure Night - "Ain't i a Child?" (ŒdO) | Nuit Obscure - «Ain't i a Child?» | Sylvain George | France, Switzerland, Portugal |
| Put Your Soul on Your Hand and Walk (ŒdO) | لماء ضع على يدك وامشي | Sepideh Farsi | France, Palestine, Iran |

(CdO) indicates film eligible for the Caméra d'Or as a feature directorial debut.
(ŒdO) indicates film eligible for the L'Œil d'or as documentary.
(QP) indicates film in competition for the Queer Palm.

=== Three films for Ukraine ===
On 13 May, the day of the festival's opening ceremony, the Cannes Mayor's Office in participation with France Télévisions and Brut media, promoted the screening of three documentaries about the War in Ukraine, addressing the ongoing violence in the country:

| English Title | Original Title | Director(s) | Production Country |
|---|---|---|---|
| 2000 Meters to Andriivka | 2000 метрів до Андріївки | Mstyslav Chernov | Ukraine, United States |
| Our War | Notre guerre | Bernard-Henri Lévy and Marc Roussel | France, Ukraine |
| Zelensky | | Yves Jeuland, Lisa Vapné and Ariane Chemin | France |

== Parallel programs ==
=== Cannes Écrans Juniors ===
Cannes Écrans Juniors is a selection of eight international feature films of particular interest to young audiences from age 13. The films compete for the Prix Cannes Écrans Juniors and Prix de Bourgogne. Below are the films featured in this selection:

| English Title | Original Title | Director(s) | Production Country |
|---|---|---|---|
| Alemania | | Maria Zanetti | Argentina, Spain |
| Christy | | Brendan Canty | Ireland |
| DJ Ahmet | Диџеј Ахмет | Georgi M. Unkovski | North Macedonia, Czech Republic, Serbia, Croatia |
| A Normal Family | 보통의 가족 | Hur Jin-ho | South Korea |
| Miss Boots | Mlle Bottine | Yan Lanouette Turgeon | Canada |
| Ollie | | Antoine Besse | France |
| Pierce | 刺心切骨 | Nelicia Low | Singapore, Taiwan, Poland |
| Tarika | Стадото | Milko Lazarov | Bulgaria, Germany, Luxembourg |

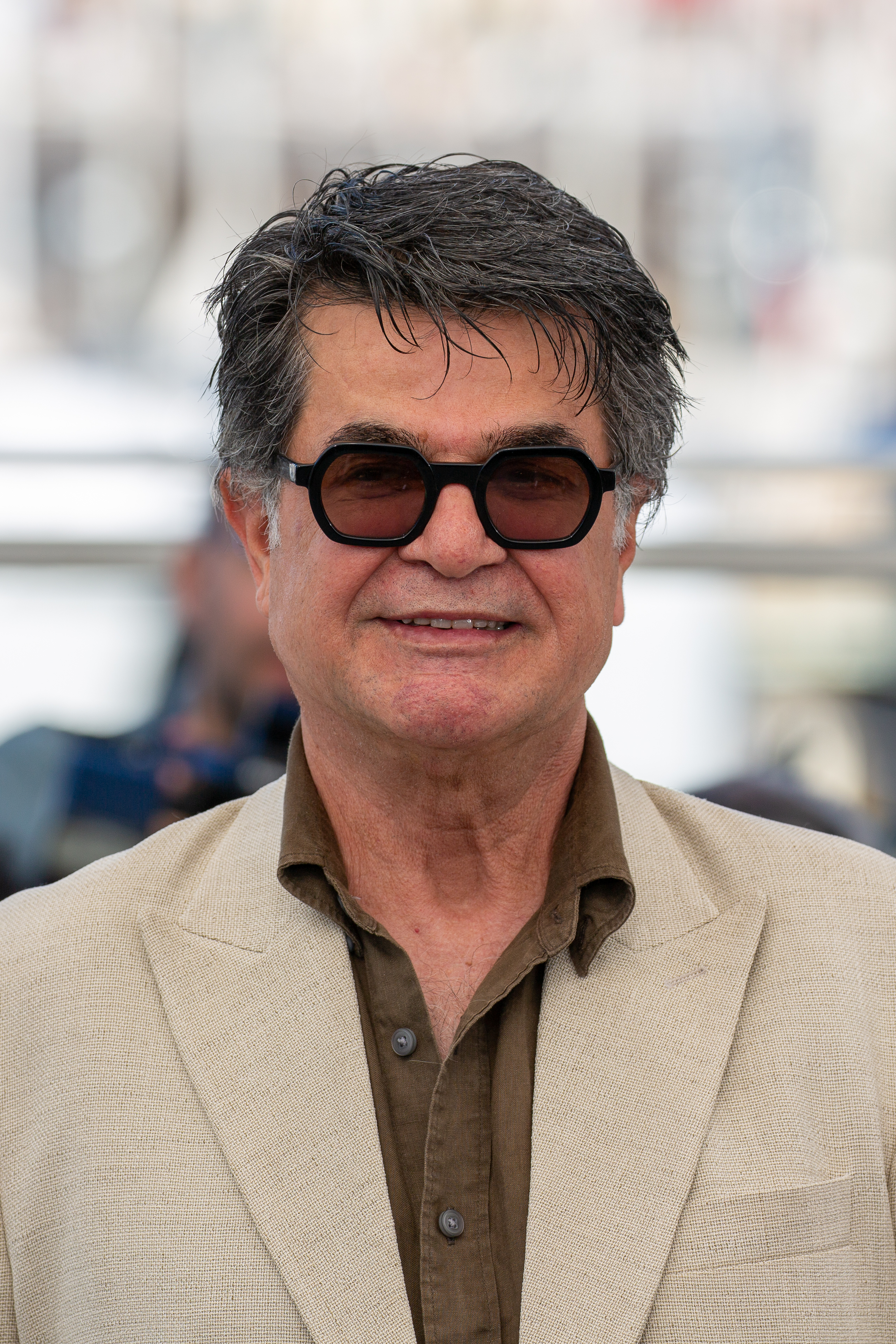
Jafar Panahi, Palme d'Or winner

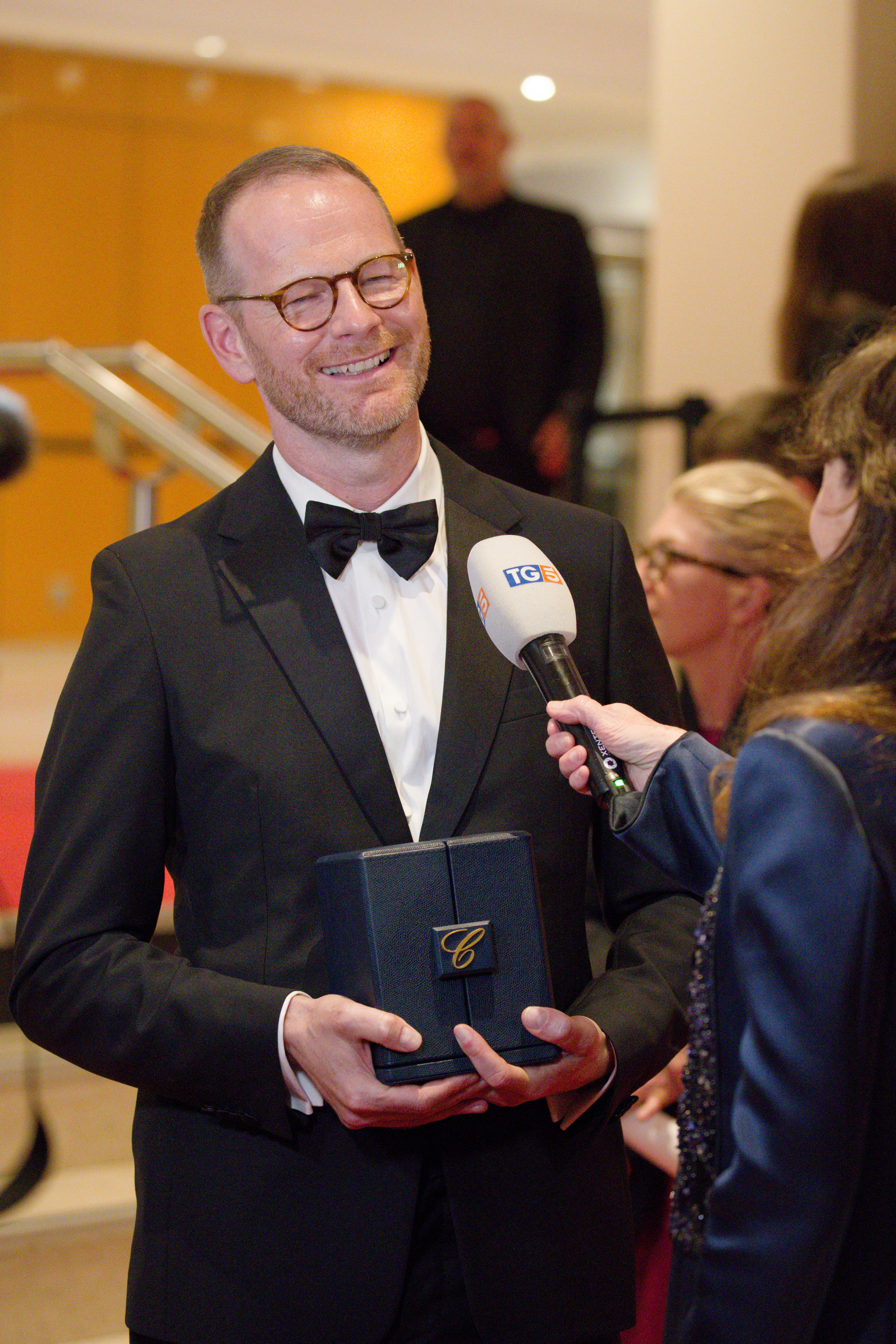
Joachim Trier, Grand Prix winner

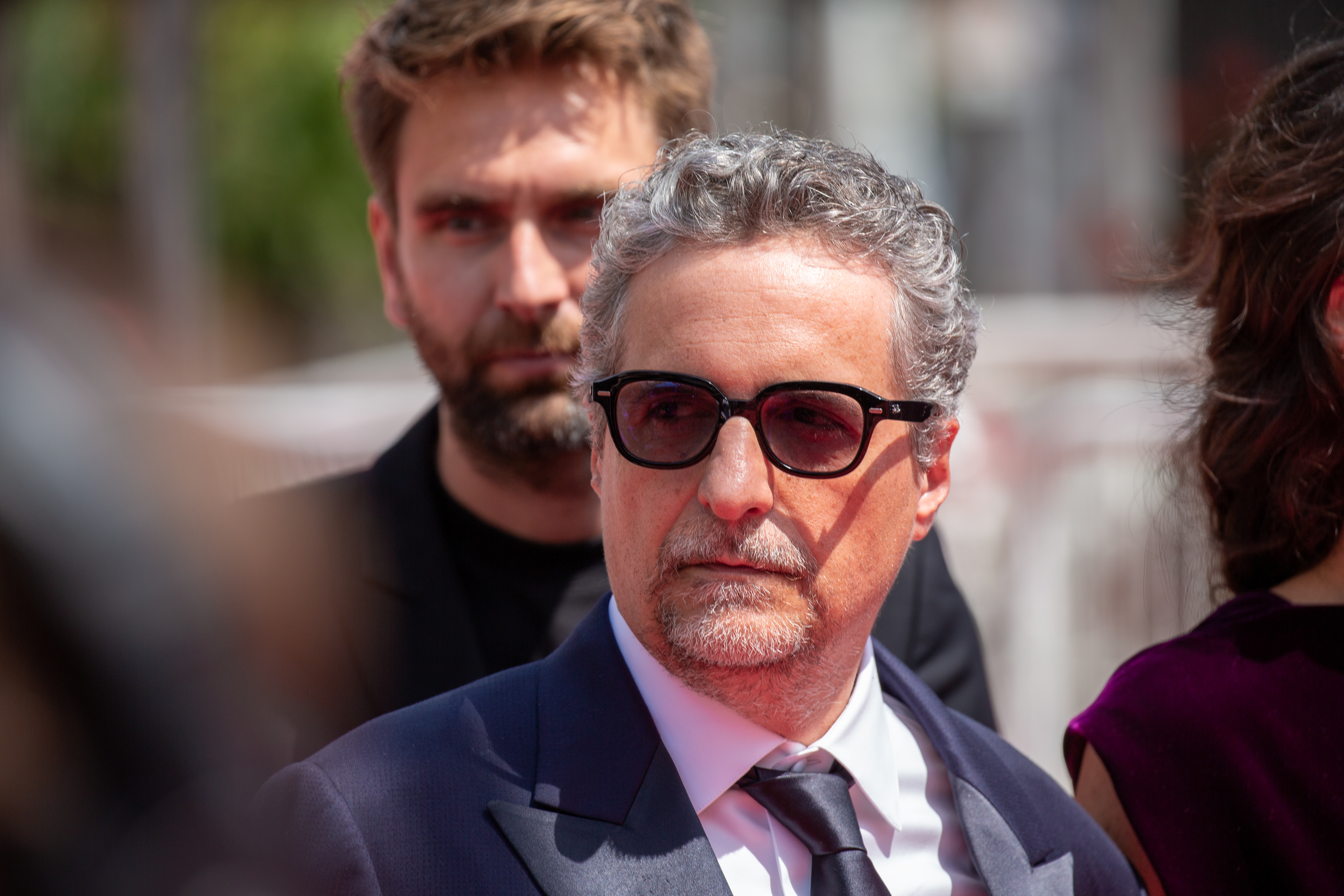
Kleber Mendonça Filho, Best Director winner

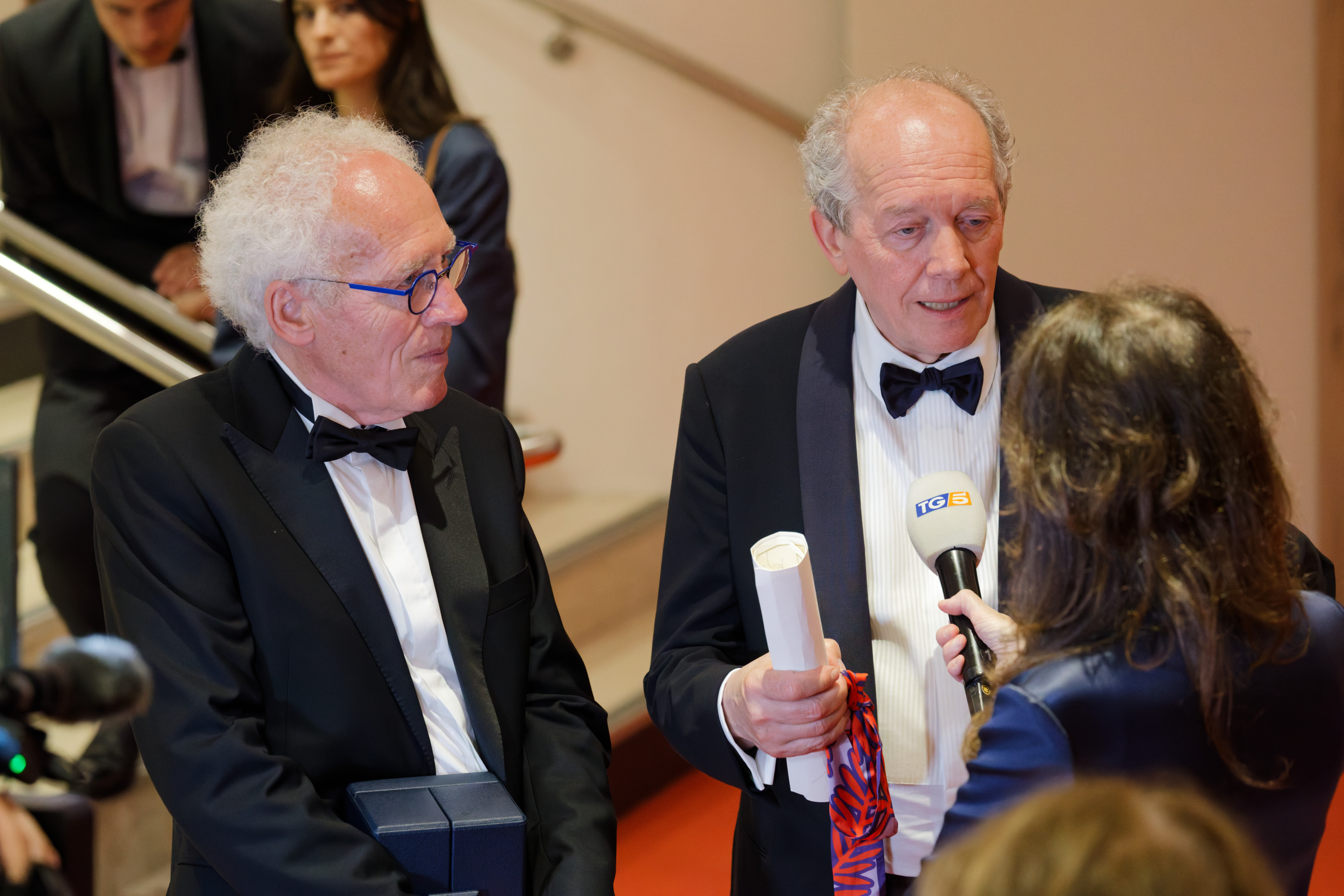
Dardenne Brothers, Best Screenplay winners

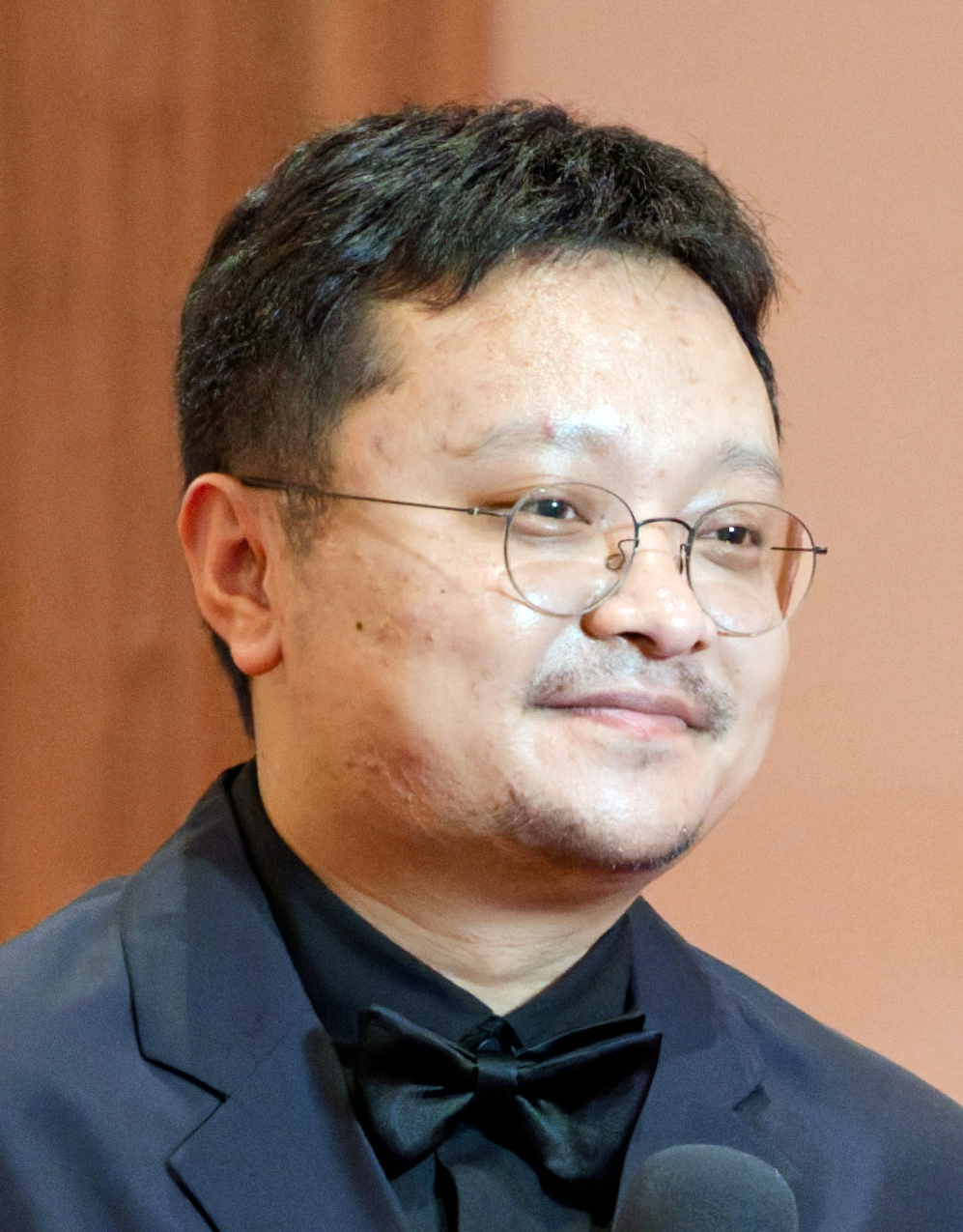
Bi Gan, Prix Spécial winner

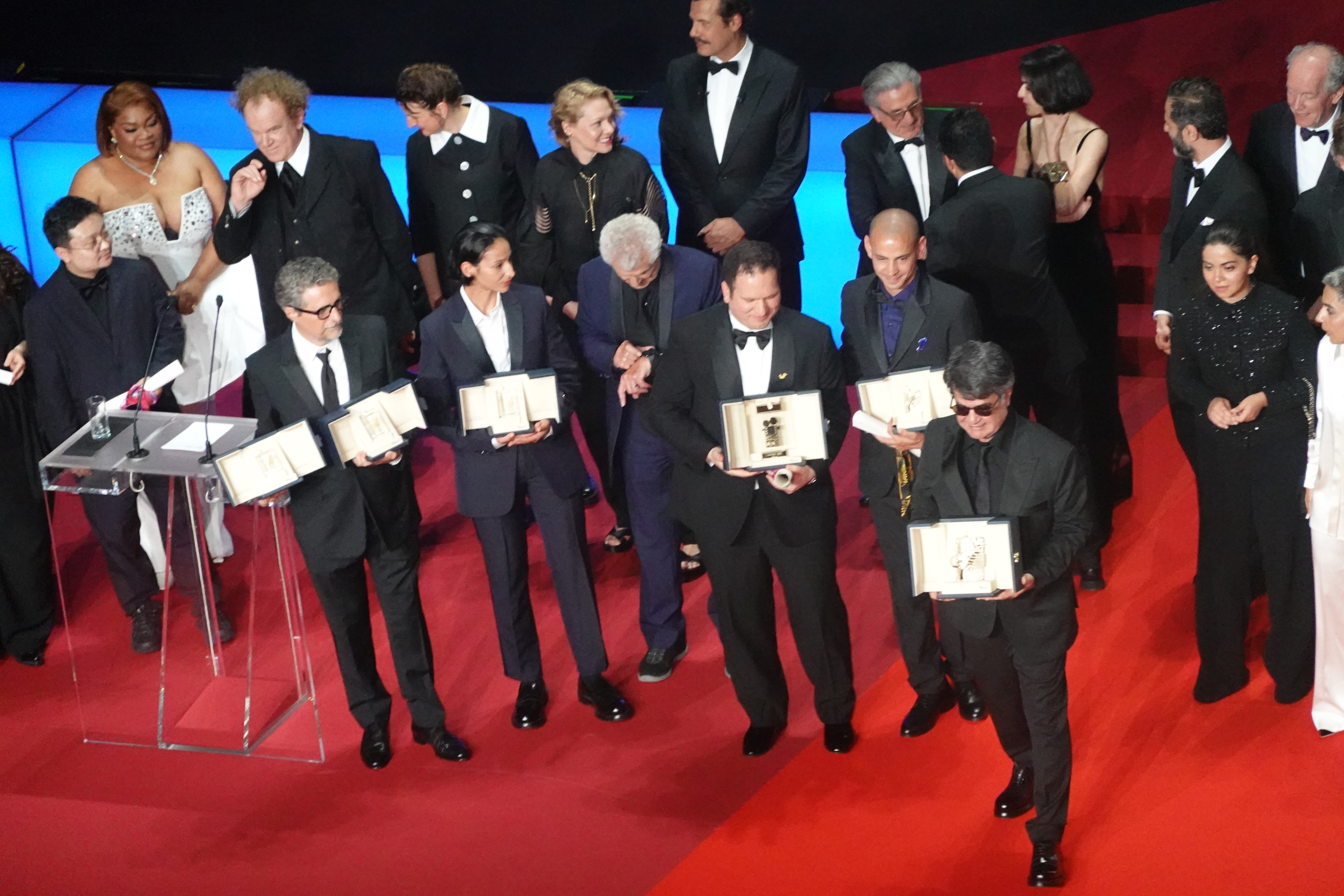
2025 winners reunite after the ceremony

== Official Awards ==
With the exception of German-produced Sound of Falling, all main competition awards corresponded to French produced or co-produced pictures.

=== In Competition ===
- Palme d'Or: It Was Just an Accident by Jafar Panahi
- Grand Prix: Sentimental Value by Joachim Trier
- Jury Prize:
  - Sirāt by Oliver Laxe
  - Sound of Falling by Mascha Schilinski
- Best Director: Kleber Mendonça Filho for The Secret Agent
- Best Actress: Nadia Melliti for The Little Sister
- Best Actor: Wagner Moura for The Secret Agent
- Best Screenplay: Jean-Pierre and Luc Dardenne for Young Mothers
- Prix Spécial: Resurrection by Bi Gan

=== Un Certain Regard ===
- Un Certain Regard Prize: The Mysterious Gaze of the Flamingo by Diego Céspedes
- Jury Prize: A Poet by Simón Mesa Soto
- Best Director: Tarzan and Arab Nasser for Once Upon a Time in Gaza
- Best Actor: Frank Dillane for Urchin
- Best Actress: Cleo Diára for I Only Rest in the Storm
- Best Screenplay: Harry Lighton for Pillion

=== Honorary Palme d'Or ===
- Robert De Niro
- Denzel Washington

=== Caméra d'Or ===
- Caméra d'Or: The President's Cake by Hasan Hadi
  - Special Mention: My Father's Shadow by Akinola Davies Jr.

=== Short Films Competition ===
- Short Film Palme d'Or: I'm Glad You're Dead Now by Tawfeek Barhom
  - Special Mention: Ali by Adnan Al Rajeev

=== Cinéfondation ===
- First Prize: First Summer by Heo Gayoung (KAFA, South Korea)
- Second Prize: 12 Moments Before the Flag-Raising Ceremony by Qu Zhizheng (Beijing Film Academy, China)
- Third Prize:
  - Ginger Boy (Separated) by Miki Tanaka (ENBU Seminar, Japan)
  - Winter in March by Natalia Mirzoyan (Estonian Academy of Arts, Estonia)

=== Immersive Competition ===
- From Dust by Michel van der Aa

== Independent Awards ==
=== FIPRESCI Prize ===
- In Competition: The Secret Agent by Kleber Mendonça Filho
- Un Certain Regard: Urchin by Harris Dickinson
- Parallel section (first features): Dandelion's Odyssey by Momoko Seto

=== Prize of the Ecumenical Jury ===
- Prix du Jury Œcuménique: Young Mothers by Jean-Pierre and Luc Dardenne

=== Critics' Week ===
- Grand Prize: A Useful Ghost by Ratchapoom Boonbunchachoke
- French Touch Prize of the Jury: Imago by Déni Oumar Pitsaev
- Louis Roederer Foundation Rising Star Award: Théodore Pellerin for Nino
- Leitz Cine Discovery Prize for Short Film: L'mina by Randa Maroufi
- Gan Foundation Award for Distribution: Left-Handed Girl by Shih-Ching Tsou
- SACD Award: Guillermo Galoe and Víctor Alonso-Berbel for Sleepless City
- Canal+ Award for Short Film: Erogenesis by Xandra Popescu

=== Directors' Fortnight ===
- Audience Award: The President's Cake by Hasan Hadi
- Europa Cinemas Label Award for Best European Film: Wild Foxes by Valéry Carnoy
- SACD Prize for Best French Film: Wild Foxes by Valéry Carnoy
- Carrosse d’Or: Todd Haynes

=== L'Œil d'or ===
- Golden Eye: Imago by Déni Oumar Pitsaev
- Special Jury Prize: The Six Billion Dollar Man by Eugene Jarecki

=== Queer Palm ===
- Best Film: The Little Sister by Hafsia Herzi
- Best Short Film: Bleat! by Ananth Subramaniam

=== Cannes Soundtrack Award ===
- Cannes Soundtrack Award: Kangding Ray for Sirāt

=== Prix François Chalais ===
- François Chalais Prize: Two Prosecutors by Sergei Loznitsa

=== Prix de la Citoyenneté ===
- Citizenship Prize: It Was Just an Accident by Jafar Panahi

=== Prix des Cinémas Art et Essai ===
- AFCAE Art House Cinema Award: The Secret Agent by Kleber Mendonça Filho
- Special Mention: Sirāt by Oliver Laxe

=== Palm Dog ===
- Palm Dog Award: Panda for The Love That Remains
- Grand Jury Prize: Pipa and Lupita for Sirāt
- Mutt Moment: Hippo for Pillion

=== Trophée Chopard ===
- Male Revelation of the Year: Finn Bennett
- Female Revelation of the Year: Marie Colomb
