= Django Films =

French film company

Django Films was a film studio run by the Oscar nominated French animator Sylvain Chomet. The studio, named after the jazz guitarist Django Reinhardt, is based in Edinburgh, Chomet's adopted home. It produced The Illusionist, based upon a previously unproduced script by Jacques Tati, as well as "The Triplets of Belleville (Les Triplettes de Belleville)" (80 min – 2003) and "La Vielle Dame et Les Pigeons" (23 min - 1998). The Django Films studio was set up solely to make this film, and was dismantled in 2010.
