= Diggs (The Simpsons) =

- The Simpsons episode
- Episode no.: Season 25; Episode 12
- Directed by: Mike Frank Polcino
- Written by: Dan Greaney; Allen Glazier
- Production code: SABF08
- Original air date: March 9, 2014

Guest appearance
- Daniel Radcliffe as Diggs

Episode features
- Chalkboard gag: Instead of writing lines as punishment, Bart draws an NCAA-style playoff bracket featuring characters from the series, with Homer and Jasper in the finals.
- Couch gag: As the Simpsons rush to the couch, the lights go off. Marge leaves to fix the fuse, and when the lights go up, the characters are drawn Triplets of Belleville-style and everything has a French aesthetic to it. Bart plays with a do-it-yourself foie gras kit, Lisa plays an accordion, Marge cries out, "Maggie? Où est Maggie?" and Homer gets up and eats a snail off the TV, oblivious that Maggie is stuck between his butt cheeks. Directed by Sylvain Chomet.

Episode chronology
← Previous "Specs and the City"	Next → "The Man Who Grew Too Much"
- The Simpsons season 25

"Diggs" is the twelfth episode of the twenty-fifth season of the American animated television series The Simpsons and the 542nd episode of the series. It premiered on the Fox network in the United States on March 9, 2014. The episode was written by Dan Greaney and Allen Glazier and directed by Mike Frank Polcino.

In the episode, Bart makes friends with a transfer student named Diggs, an expert in falconry who saves Bart from the wrath of the Springfield Elementary bullies – and who intends to take to the sky himself, which makes Bart worry about Diggs' sanity. Daniel Radcliffe guest starred as Diggs. The episode received mixed reviews.

== Plot ==
When a visiting and newly converted Christian minister from Indonesia pleads with Springfield churchgoers for a donation to help sick children, Bart sympathizes with a boy his own age. Bart has a difficult time asking his parents for a donation, but Homer eventually relents, lending Bart $20. However, Homer almost instantly starts to pester Bart for repayment. Feeling the pressure of Homer's badgering, Bart confides in Milhouse at the playground before a costumed devil makes Bart an offer: if he eats anything for the money, he will be able to get the $20. Bart asks his classmates to help him out of his bind, offering to eat anything except money.

Soon enough, Bart receives offers to eat used chewing gum, orthodontic wax, cinnamon, St. John's wort, and a preserved frog prepared for dissection, even though Lisa warns her brother to not consume the animal. After eating the frog Bart ends up in the hospital. Bart pays his father back the $20 (which Homer had forgotten about), but the hospital bill is $4,000. The next day Bart's friends and schoolmates, including Milhouse, shun him for eating the frog. Just when the school bullies are about to attack Bart, a new transfer student named Diggs saves the day with his falcon, Freedom. He reveals to Bart the hidden Falconry Club headquarters behind the school. As Bart spends more and more time with Diggs, he learns about falconry and conducts some mischief around town by teaching Freedom to snatch Springfielders' belongings.

One day, Diggs dives from a high tree branch, resulting in his injury and emergency hospitalization. Bart questions what prompted his new friend to act as he did. Diggs explains he wanted to fly, alarming Bart with his idea that maybe all people can fly and don't know this because they don't try it anymore. Bart is told to leave the room by an uncharacteristically sober and blunt-sounding Dr. Hibbert and an unidentified doctor and overhears that Diggs will transfer over to a mental hospital. Homer and Marge recognize that this is not good news, and Marge clues in Bart that this means Diggs has serious problems and that the mental hospital is "not a place we should ever bring a little boy to". Homer suggests that Bart merely resume his friendship with Milhouse. Lisa is very sympathetic to Bart and he is appreciative of the comfort.

Bart goes back to school and leaves the bullies stunned and silent when he responds to their taunting by angrily saying how bad it is that his friend is mentally ill. When Bart enters the falconry club, Diggs is there climbing through a window, claiming to have gotten a day pass to participate in a falconry contest. At the contest, Diggs unveils to Bart a plan to free all the falcons. Bart helps Diggs enact the plan, and the falcons fly away in a flock. Diggs thanks Bart for his friendship and rides his bike back to the mental hospital, noting he's unlikely to get any freedom for a long time but glad they had the time together they did. Immediately afterwards, Milhouse arrives to apologize to Bart for avoiding him earlier and the two reconcile.

== Production ==
The couch gag was directed by animator Sylvain Chomet. Creator Matt Groening personally invited Chomet to create a couch gag. Production of the couch gag was done at th1ng in London. The drawing was done on paper by hand before being photographed. Color was then added digitally. The final composite and effects were done on computer. To reconcile Chomet's style with the round eyes of the Simpsons, Chomet made all the characters wear glasses.

In June 2013, Entertainment Weekly reported that Daniel Radcliffe would guest star as Diggs. Executive producer Al Jean described the character as a mix of Holden Caulfield, Finny from A Separate Peace, and the children in Lord of the Flies. Radcliffe previously appeared as a different character in the twenty-second season episode "Treehouse of Horror XXI."

== Cultural references ==
"Come Saturday Morning" by The Sandpipers is heard while Diggs and Bart perform falconry.

Principal Skinner is shown to be able to speak Esperanto.

== Reception ==
Dennis Perkins of The A.V. Club gave the episode a C+, saying "It’s just that it’s Bart, and Bart doesn’t fit these sorts of stories as well as, say, Lisa does—his character’s just not built for 'affecting,' at least not any more. There’s no connection made between his initial generosity toward the kid in the church story and his willingness to remain loyal to his new friend. And so 'Diggs' fades in the memory. You know, just as Diggs himself will once Bart breaks out the slingshot again next week.".

Gonzo Green of Bubbleblabber gave the episode a 7.5 out of 10. He stated that the episode was forgettable but with some unexpected laughs.

Animation historian Jerry Beck praised the couch gag directed by French animator Sylvain Chomet as "sublime".

The episode received a 1.2 rating and was watched by a total of 2.69 million people. It was the third most watched show on Animation Domination.
