= Neomis Animation =

Neomis Animation is an animation studio that focus on the development of animated content for film and television. It is located in Paris and was founded in January 2004 right after the closing of the Disney Feature Animation Studio in Paris, by 22 of the former Disney artists. They’re a spin-off of the Disney Paris group that worked on Tarzan and Lilo & Stitch.

== Feature films they´ve recently worked on include ==
- Asterix and the Vikings (Additional Animation Services)
- Curious George (additional animation)
- The Illusionist (Character design, character animation and clean up studio)
- Titeuf (executive producer of animation and lead studio)
