= Vultures (short film) =

- Directed by: Dian Weys
- Written by: Dian Weys
- Produced by: Le Roux Fourie; Émilie Dubois; Anaïs Bertrand
- Starring: Edwin van der Walt; Jill Levenberg; Albert Pretorius; Oscar Petersen
- Cinematography: Pierre de Villiers
- Release date: May 2025 (Cannes)
- Countries: France; South Africa

Vultures is a 2025 French-South African short film written and directed by Dian Weys. Set in the aftermath of a car accident, the film explores the work of tow-truck drivers and the behaviour of people responding to violence and those in need of help.

The film had its world premiere at the shorts film competition of the 78th Cannes Film Festival, where it competed for the Short Film Palme d'Or and won the Unifrance Short Film Grand Prix.

It won the Best Short Film Grand Prize at the 2026 HollyShorts Film Festival, taking the festival’s top honor and an Oscar-qualifying award.

== Plot ==
Vultures follows a struggling tow-truck driver who arrives at a car accident scene and competes to secure the wrecked vehicle, but events soon spiral out of his control.

== Cast ==
- Edwin van der Walt as Paul
- Jill Levenberg as Gayle
- Albert Pretorius as Anton
- Oscar Petersen as Duncan
- Ndoni Khanyile as Palesa
- David Isaacs as Stuart
- Gershwin Mias
- Dean Balie
- Frank Opperman

== Production ==
Vultures was written and directed by Dian Weys, who developed the screenplay over six years, producing approximately 25 drafts. French producers Émilie Dubois and Anaïs Bertrand secured funding from France's National Centre for Cinema and the Moving Image and ARTE France after the project's local funding applications were unsuccessful. The film marked the first international co-production for South African producer Le Roux Fourie, who collaborated with Dubois and Bertrand.

In an interview, Weys said the film was inspired by his experiences following two car accidents, during which tow-truck drivers arrived and competed for his business. He was also interested in examining the circumstances surrounding road accidents and the responsibilities of those involved in their aftermath. He researched the subject through interviews and ride-alongs with tow-truck drivers, drawing on their accounts of both the commercial pressures of the job and their role in assisting accident victims.

Weys had previously worked with several members of the crew, including cinematographer Pierre de Villiers and production designer Bathoni Robinson. The four lead roles were written specifically for Edwin van der Walt, Jill Levenberg, Albert Pretorius and Oscar Petersen, who had been involved in the project for more than five years before filming began.

== Release ==
Vultures was selected for the Short Film Competition at the 2025 Cannes Film Festival, where it was nominated for the Short Film Palme d'Or and won the Unifrance Short Film Grand Prix. The film subsequently won the Jury Prizes for Best Film and Best Cinematography at the 2025 Bucharest Short Film Festival, as well as the Jury Award for Best Short Film at the 2025 Philadelphia Film Festival. Its festival run continued into 2026, with a screening at the Clermont-Ferrand International Short Film Festival.

In April 2026, it was announced as part of the 2026 Tribeca Festival's shorts lineup, where it screened in the Shorts: Helpline programme. At the 2026 HollyShorts Film Festival, Vultures won the Grand Jury Prize for Best Short Film and the Best International award. The Grand Jury Prize qualified the film for Academy Award consideration and included a $60,000 Panavision camera package. The film also previously screened at the Red Sea International Film Festival in Saudi Arabia and the Zagreb Film Festival in Croatia.
