= Agapito (film) =

- Film poster
- Directed by: Arvin Belarmino; Kyla Danelle Romero
- Written by: Arvin Belarmino; Kyla Danelle Romero
- Screenplay by: Arvin Belarmino; Kyla Danelle Romero
- Produced by: Jon Galvez; Carlos Ortiz; Mick Quito
- Starring: Nour Hooshmand; Joel Garcia; Jeremy Mayores; Andre Miguel; Anton Nolasco; Veronica Reyes; Christina Simon
- Cinematography: Geia de Vera
- Edited by: John Rogers
- Music by: Gelo Diamos
- Production companies: 901 Studios; Astral 88
- Release date: May 2025 (Cannes)
- Running time: 15 minutes
- Country: Philippines
- Language: Tagalog

Agapito is a 2025 Filipino short drama film written and directed by Arvin Belarmino and Kyla Danelle Romero. The film stars Nour Hooshmand as part of a group of workers who manually set pin at an old duckpin bowling alley.

It had its world premiere at the Short Film Palme d'Or competition of the Cannes Film Festival on 23 May 2025. It was subsequently screened at the Toronto International Film Festival on 24 September 2025, where it received an honorable mention for the Best International Short Film award.

== Plot ==
It's about a group of pin settlers who works at the duckpin bowling.

== Cast ==
- Nour Hooshmand as Mira
- Andre Miguel as Junior
- Anton Nolasco as Tonton
- Jeremy Mayores as Buboy
- Veronica Reyes as Lisel
- Joel Garcia as Adeng
- Bullet Dumas as Karlo

== Release ==
Agapito premiered at the Cannes Film Festival on 13 May 2025, where it competed for the Short Film Palme d'Or, before making its North American premiere at the Toronto International Film Festival on 4 September 2025, winning an honorable mention for the Best International Short Film award. The short film was then screened in the Philippines at the QCinema International Film Festival. It also featured at the Bangkok International Film Festival, Kaohsiung Film Festival, and El Gouna Film Festival in October 2025, Clermont-Ferrand International Short Film Festival in France in January 2026, and Brussels Short Film Festival in Belgium in April 2026.

== Accolades ==
Award	Date of ceremony	Category	Recipient(s)	Result	Ref.
Bogotá Short Film Festival	8 December 2025	Best International Short Film Award	Agapito	Won	
Cannes Film Festival	24 May 2025	Short Film Palme d'Or	Agapito	Nominated	
Clermont-Ferrand International Short Film Festival	7 February 2026	Grand Prix	Agapito	Nominated	
Dieciminuti Film Festival	23 May 2026	Best Cinematography	Geia De Vera	Won	
Drunken Film Fest	9 October 2026	Best World Narrative Award	Agapito	Won	
El Gouna Film Festival	24 October 2025	Golden Star for Best Short Film	Agapito	Won	
In The Palace International Short Film Festival	28 June 2026	Best Fiction	Agapito	Won	
Landshut Short Film Festival	16 March 2026	International Dräxlmaier Short Film Award	Agapito	Won	
Los Angeles Asian Pacific Film Festival	3 May 2026	Golden Reel, Best Narrative Short Award	Agapito	Won	
Palm Springs International ShortFest	29 June 2026	Best International Short	Agapito	Won	
Palm Springs International ShortFest	29 June 2026	Desert Views Local Jury Award	Agapito	Won	
Toronto International Film Festival	14 September 2025	Honorable Mention (Short Cuts Award)	Agapito	Won	
