= Jacques Muller (animator) =

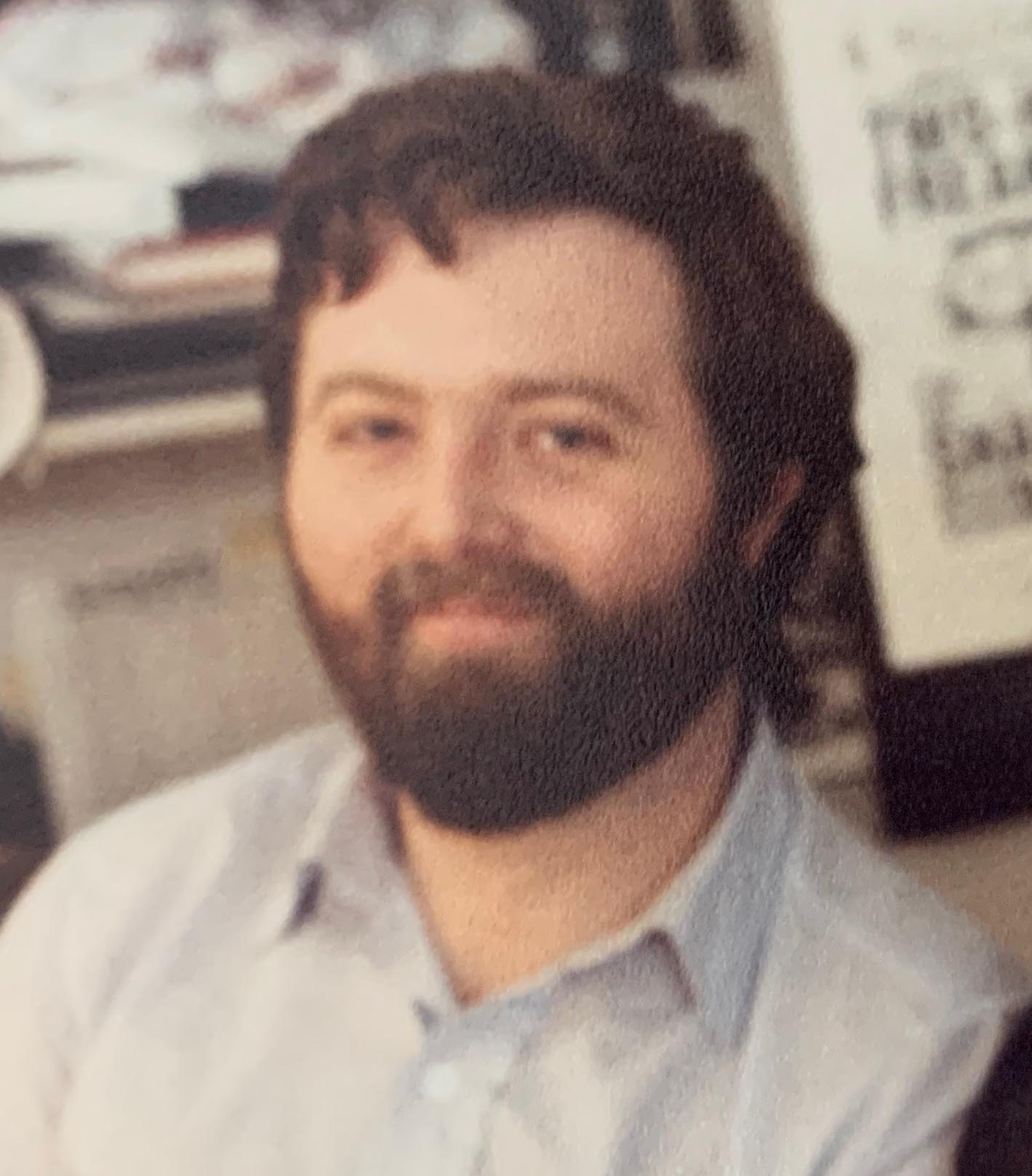
- Jacques Muller in 1985
- Born: August 13, 1956; Cognac, France
- Died: November 4, 2018 (aged 62)
- Occupations: Animator, author

Jacques Muller (August 13, 1956 – November 4, 2018) was a French animator who worked on many animated films during the Second Golden Age of Animation including Who Framed Roger Rabbit, The Illusionist, Star Wars: Episode I – The Phantom Menace, Space Jam and The Emperor's New Groove. Muller was born in France but spent much of his career working in the United Kingdom and the United States, working for studios such as Disney, Warner Bros., Amblin and ILM. He died in November 2018 following heart complications.

== Early life ==
Jacques Muller was born on August 13, 1956, in Saint-Aignan, Loir-et-Cher, France.

== Career ==
Muller began his animation career in France and Australia, moving to London in September 1987 to work on Who Framed Roger Rabbit, which was crewing up in Camden Town in North London. He began work as assistant animator to Phil Nibbelink, under animation director Richard Williams, described by Muller as "extremely picky...and rightly so" about the standard of animation done at the studio. Later, frustrated with his assistant status, Muller completed a lengthy animation test, and was promoted to animator by Williams: "Jacques, pick up your things and follow me: you are an animator".

In January 1989 Muller joined the Walt Disney Studio in Glendale, California, working in a former warehouse building on Airway, the former site of the Glendale Airport. Muller began work on the Roger Rabbit short film Tummy Trouble, as the studio prepared for work on Beauty and the Beast.

Later, Muller worked on The Rescuers Down Under, where he also lent his voice to the character of Francois the Cockroach. However, Muller was unhappy at the working conditions at the Disney Airway Building in Glendale, which lacked natural light. As a result, he left the Disney Studio to return to France, starting a new contract as character art manager for Disney in Paris, a move which he described as "the biggest mistake of my professional life".

=== Memoirs ===
Muller was the author of the book 40 Years of Animated Cartoons, published by Partridge Publishing in Singapore, on 19 April 2018.

== Health problems ==
Muller first began suffering from heart problems in December 2001, when he found himself hospitalised in Jarnac, France, following "a weird sensation...a rail across my chest".

Muller died in hospital in France following heart complications on 4 November 2018.
