= Ali (2025 short film) =

2025 film by Adnan Al Rajeev

- Official poster
- Directed by: Adnan Al Rajeev
- Written by: Arvin Belarmino, Kyla Danelle Romero
- Screenplay by: Arvin Belarmino; Kayla Danelle Romero
- Produced by: Tanvir Hossain; Kristine De Leon
- Starring: Al Amin; Indrani Soma
- Cinematography: Qamrul Hassan Khasru
- Edited by: Taiful Shadeen
- Production companies: Katalog Films; Narra Studios; Barebones Inc.; Getafixxi
- Release date: 22 May 2025 (Cannes)
- Running time: 15 minutes
- Countries: Bangladesh; Philippines
- Language: Bengali

Ali is a 2025 Bangladeshi-Philippine short film directed by Adnan Al Rajeev, starring Al Amin as Ali and Indrani Soma as his mother. The short film had its world premiere in the Short Film Competition of the 78th Cannes Film Festival on 22 May 2025, where it received a Special Mention, marking the first Bangladeshi entry in the short film competition's history.

== Plot ==
In a conservative coastal town where women are forbidden from singing, a teenage boy named Ali defies tradition by entering a singing competition. He hopes to win a chance to move to the city, but his participation harbors a deeper, more sinister secret.

== Cast ==
- Al Amin as Ali
- Indrani Soma as Ali's mother

== Production ==
Ali is a co-production between Bangladesh and the Philippines. The film was written by Arvin Belarmino and Kyla Danelle Romero, and produced by Tanvir Hossain and Kristine De Leon under KATALOG FILMS, with additional support from NARRA POST-PRODUCTION STUDIOS, BAREBONES INC, and GETAFIXXI. Post-production, including sound and grading, was handled in the Philippines due to limited facilities in Bangladesh.

Filming took place in various locations across Sylhet in December 2024. The shooting was completed over five consecutive days.

== Release ==
The film had its world premiere at the 78th Cannes Film Festival on 22 May 2025, as part of the Short Film Competition. It was the first Bangladeshi film to be selected for this category and received two screenings on the same day.

== Reception ==
At the 2025 Cannes Film Festival, Ali received a Special Mention in the Short Film Palme d’Or category, recognizing its storytelling and direction. This marked a historic achievement for Bangladeshi cinema. Director Adnan Al Rajeev commented on the competition, stating, "As expected, the nominated short films at Cannes are incredibly powerful in terms of storytelling, direction, and presentation."
