= Ria (film) =

2026 drama film by Arvin Belarmino

- Directed by: Arvin Belarmino
- Written by: Arvin Belarmino; Kyla Danelle Romero
- Produced by: Kristine de Leon; Alemberg Ang; Pavel Feldman; Wesley Yap; Jefferson Moneo
- Starring: Nour Hooshmand
- Cinematography: Geia De Vera
- Edited by: Renard Torres
- Music by: Kid Moxie
- Production companies: WAF Studios; Daluyong Studios; Nathan Studios; Human Films; Fidalgo Films; Prowler Pictures
- Release date: October 10, 2026 (Busan)
- Running time: 95 minutes
- Countries: Philippines; Netherlands; Norway; Saudi Arabia; Japan
- Language: Tagalog

Ria is a 2026 drama film directed by Arvin Belarmino in his directorial debut from a screenplay he co-wrote with Kyla Danelle Romero. The film stars Nour Hooshmand in the titular role, with Sylvia Sanchez, Iana Bernardez, Veronica Reyes, Anastasia Bartolome, in supporting roles. It is an international co-production of Philippines, Netherlands, Norway, Saudi Arabia, and Japan.

The film had its world premiere at the 31st Busan International Film Festival on October 10, 2026, where it won the Heart of Eurasia Award.

== Premise ==
Ria, a punk musician, embarks on a mission to protect her community from demolition and corruption while caring for its matriarch.

== Cast ==
- Nour Hooshmand as Ria
- Sylvia Sanchez as Olga
- Iana Bernardez
- Cedrick Juan
- Veronica Reyes
- Anastasia Bartolome

== Production ==
In February 2022, Belarmino participated at the Cinéfondation La Residence to develop the screenplay of the film. In May 2023, the project was presented at the La Fabrique Cinéma, held by the Institut Français. In May 2024, the project received $30,000 production grant from the Purin Pictures. Belarmino participated at the 2024 Cannes Critics' Week's Next Step program which supports directors to develop their first feature films. In October 2024, it participated at the Tokyo Gap-Financing Market, held during the Tokyo International Film Festival. In June 2025, the project received 500,000 Norwegian krone from the Sørfond.

Principal photography began in September 2025.

== Release ==
Ria had its world premiere at the Vision section of the 31st Busan International Film Festival on October 10, 2026. The film won the Heart of Eurasia Award at the festival. In October 2026, it was reported that Lights On had acquired the film's international sales rights.
