= A Magnificent Life =

- Theatrical release poster
- French: Marcel et Monsieur Pagnol
- Directed by: Sylvain Chomet
- Written by: Sylvain Chomet
- Produced by: Eric Goossens; Ashargin Poiré; Valérie Puech; Aton Soumache
- Starring: Laurent Lafitte; Géraldine Pailhas
- Cinematography: Elric Lefeuvre
- Music by: Stefano Bollani
- Production companies: What The Prod; Mediawan; Bidibul Productions; Walking The Dog
- Distributed by: Wild Bunch (France); Sony Pictures Classics (United States)
- Release dates: May 17, 2025 (Cannes); October 15, 2025 (France); March 27, 2026 (United States)
- Running time: 91 minutes
- Countries: France; Belgium; United States; Luxembourg
- Languages: French; English
- Box office: $1 million

A Magnificent Life (French: Marcel et Monsieur Pagnol, lit. 'Marcel and Mr. Pagnol') is a 2025 adult animated biographical drama film written and directed by Sylvain Chomet. The film had its world premiere at the Special Screenings section of the 2025 Cannes Film Festival on 17 May 2025, and was theatrically released in France by Wild Bunch on 15 October 2025.

== Summary ==
It follows the life of 60-year-old Marcel Pagnol, an acclaimed playwright, novelist and filmmaker, who is visited by a vision of his childhood self.

== Cast ==
- Laurent Lafitte as Marcel Pagnol
- Géraldine Pailhas as Augustine Pagnol

== Production ==
In June 2021, the film was announced at the Annecy International Animation Film Festival, with Sylvain Chomet directing the film, and Aton Soumache and Ashargin Poiré serving as producers.

== Release ==
In May 2022, Sony Pictures Classics acquired distribution rights to the film for North and Latin America, the Middle East, Israel, Scandinavia, India, Italy, airlines and ships. In May 2024, Picturehouse Entertainment acquired U.K. and Ireland distribution rights. The film was released in France on 15 October 2025, by Wild Bunch. The film was released in the United States on 27 March 2026. The film had its world premiere at Special Screenings section of the 2025 Cannes Film Festival on 17 May 2025. It also screened as a part of the official competition at the 2025 Annecy International Animation Film Festival.

== Reception ==
On the review aggregator website Rotten Tomatoes, 60% of 55 critic reviews are positive.

Brian Tallerico of RogerEbert.com wrote, "...the film might feel slight compared to both the work of its subject and the other works by its director. But Chomet’s eye for hand-drawn animation remains a gift, and this film is deeper than it first appears."

=== Accolades ===
Award / Film Festival	Date of ceremony	Category	Recipient(s)	Result	Ref.
Annecy International Animation Film Festival	14 June 2025	Best Feature Film	A Magnificent Life	Nominated	
New York Film Critics Online	December 15, 2025	Best Animation	A Magnificent Life	Nominated	
Lumière Awards	18 January 2026	Best Animated Film	A Magnificent Life	Nominated	
Annie Awards	February 21, 2026	Best Feature - Independent	A Magnificent Life	Nominated	
Seville European Film Festival	7–15 November 2025	Giraldillo de Oro – Best Film	A Magnificent Life	Nominated	
