= Adnan Al Rajeev =

Bangladeshi director, producer and scriptwriter

- আদনান আল রাজীব
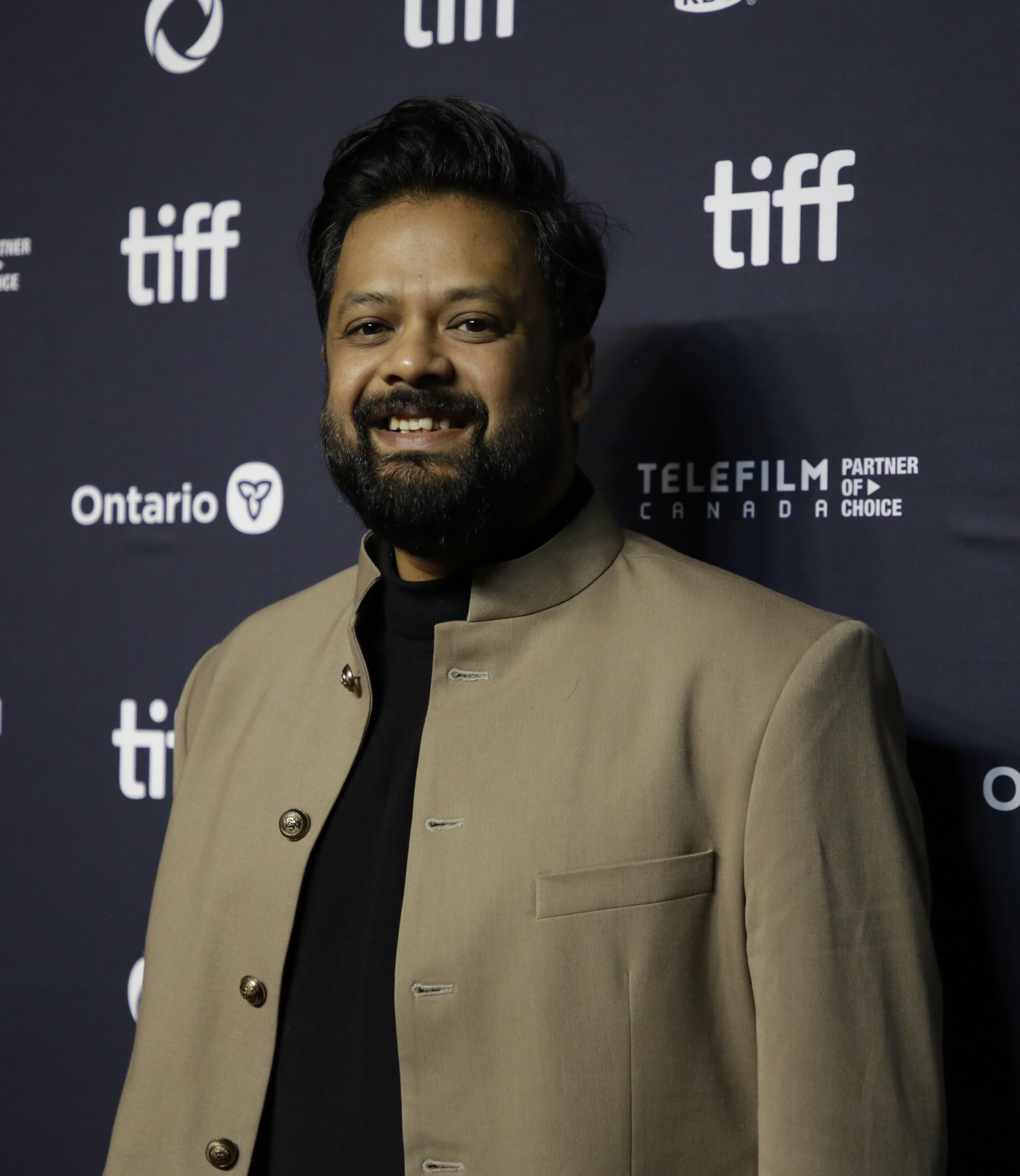
- Rajeev in 2025 at TIFF.
- Born: 11 May 1987 (age 39); Tangail, Bangladesh
- Occupations: Filmmaker, producer, and script writer
- Years active: 2004–present
- Spouse: Mehazabien Chowdhury (m. 2025)

Adnan Al Rajeev (11 May 1987) is a Bangladeshi filmmaker, producer and scriptwriter known for his contributions to television, advertising and cinema. He began his career in 2004 and has since been a known in the Bangladeshi entertainment industry. He has served as a creative director and co-director for various productions, including the 2024 season of Coke Studio Bangla.

== Early life and education ==
Born in Tangail, Bangladesh, Rajeev started his journey in the visual medium at the age of 17. He began as an assistant director at Chabial, a production house founded by filmmaker Mostofa Sarwar Farooki.

== Career ==
=== Television and Advertising ===
After five years as an assistant director, Rajeev made his directorial debut with the television film Ucchotoro Podartho Biggan in 2008. He went on to direct several TV dramas, including All Time Dourer Upor (2013), Middle Class Sentiment (2014), and Bikal Belar Pakhi (2017). In addition to television, he has directed numerous television commercials and founded Runout Films.

=== Web and Film Projects ===
Rajeev expanded into web content with the 2021 release of YouTumor on the OTT platform Chorki. He has produced numerous web films and series for platforms like Chorki and Hoichoi Bangladesh, including titles such as Mohanagar 2, Khachar Vetor Ochin Pakhi, and Nikhoj.

=== International recognition ===
In 2024, Rajeev co-produced the short film Radikals, which was officially selected for the 63rd Semaine de la Critique at the 77th Cannes Film Festival. He also produced the feature film Dear Maloti, which was selected for the Cairo Film Festival. He is the first Bangladeshi film director to have a short film officially selected for the Short Film Competition at the Cannes Film Festival in the Palme d'Or short film category. The film is titled Ali.

== Filmography ==
=== Feature film ===
Key
†	Denotes films that have not yet been released

Year	Title	Credit as	Notes	Ref.
2024	Priyo Maloti	Producer		
2025	Ali	Director	Short film; Special Mention in the Short Film category at the 78th Cannes Film Festival	
2026	Opolok †	Director	Directorial debut film; filming	

=== Television ===
- Uccho toro podharto biggan (2009)
- Lucky Thirteen (2009)
- Parshoborti Prem Nibedon (2009)
- @18 All-time Dourer Upor (2013)
- Middle Class Sentiment (2014)
- Bikal Belar Pakhi (2017)
- YouTumor (2021)

== Personal life ==
On February 14, 2025, Adnan Al Rajeev married actress Mehazabien Chowdhury. The couple had been in a relationship for around 13 years, before tying the knot.

== Accolades ==
Year	Award	Category	Film	Result	Ref
2025	Meril Prothom Alo Awards-Critics	Best Film	Priyo Maloti	Won	
2025	Cannes Film Festival-Special Mention	Short Film	Ali	Won	
2025	Toronto International Film Festival	Short Film	Ali	Nominated	
2025	Kyiv International Short Film Festival	Short Film	Ali	Won	
