= Ariane Chemin =

French journalist and writer

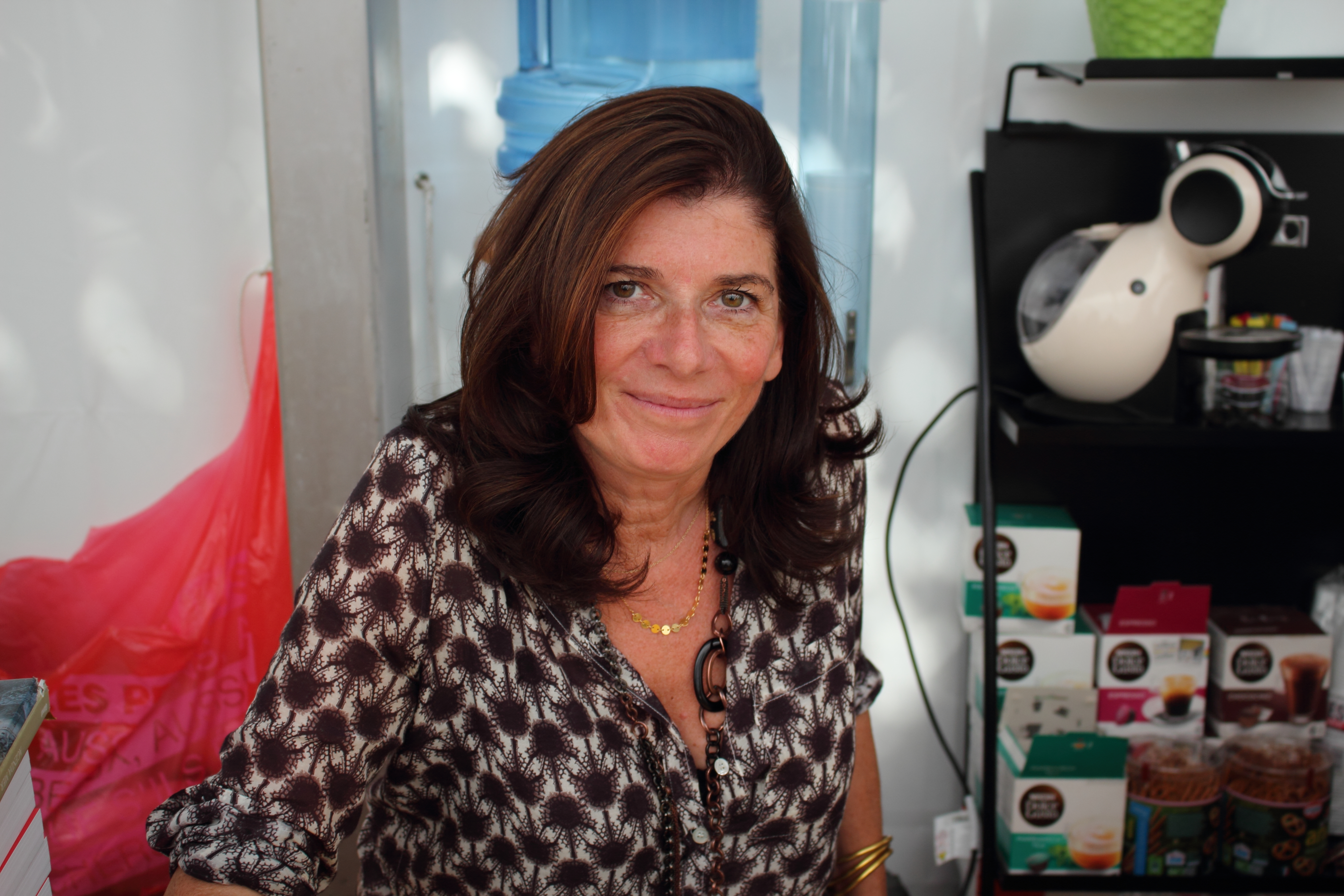
- Le Livre sur la Place 2016
- Born: 7 May 1962 (age 64); France
- Education: Sciences Po
- Occupations: Journalist essayist
- Employer: Le Monde

Ariane Chemin (French pronunciation: [aʁjan ʃəmɛ̃]), born in 1962, is a French journalist and writer.

== Biography ==
Ariane Chemin graduated in humanities and is an alumna of Sciences Po.

In 2011, Ariane Chemin joined Le Monde, where she had been covering such topics as politics and society problems before she became a senior reporter.

Michel Houellebecq sued Le Monde for one of Chemin's articles but lost and had to pay 4000 euros to the newspaper.

In 2015, she received the Marie Claire prize.
