= Attila Marcel =

2013 French comedy film by Sylvain Chomet

- Film poster
- Directed by: Sylvain Chomet
- Written by: Sylvain Chomet
- Produced by: Chris Bolzli; Claudie Ossard
- Starring: Guillaume Gouix; Anne Le Ny; Bernadette Lafont; Hélène Vincent
- Cinematography: Antoine Roch
- Edited by: Simon Jacquet
- Production company: Eurowide Film Production
- Distributed by: Pathé
- Release dates: 6 September 2013 (TIFF); 30 October 2013 (France)
- Running time: 106 minutes
- Country: France
- Language: French
- Budget: $6.7 million
- Box office: $1.2 million

Attila Marcel is a 2013 French comedy film written and directed by Sylvain Chomet.

== Plot ==
Paul, a young virtuoso pianist and a fan of chouquettes, lives with his two aristocratic aunts, Annie and Anna, who run a dance class of which he is the official pianist. He has been mute since the age of two, when he saw his parents, Anita and Marcel, die in front of him.

One day, he brings a record to Mr. Coelho, the blind piano tuner who dropped it down the stairs, and finds it in the home of Mrs Proust, a neighbour who grows vegetables at home and plays the ukulele. In secret from his aunts, he undertakes therapy with Mrs Proust which consists of strange herbal teas whose taste is masked by madeleines and which make him relive, in flashes of memory, the events which led to the tragedy.

In turn, Paul learns to manage his relationships with music and with Michelle, a young Chinese cellist and adopted daughter of a friend of his aunts.

== Cast ==
- Guillaume Gouix as Paul and Attila Marcel
- Anne Le Ny as Madame Proust
- Bernadette Lafont as Aunt Annie
  - Elsa Davoine as Young Aunt Annie
- Hélène Vincent as Aunt Anna
  - Laetitia Poulalion as Young Aunt Anna
- Jean-Claude Dreyfus as M. Kruzinsky
- Luis Rego as M. Coelho

== Production ==
The film was produced through Eurowide Film Production. The budget was 6.7 million euros. Filming took place in the Paris area from mid-July 2012 and lasted 46 days.

== Release ==
The film premiered in the Special Presentation section at the 2013 Toronto International Film Festival. It was released in France by Pathé Distribution on 30 October 2013. It had 43,645 admissions in France.

== Reception ==
Attila Marcel has been met with mixed critical response from the French press, with Le Parisien rating it 5/5 but Cahiers du cinéma rating it 1/5. Collating press reviews French online film site Allocine reports an average press critic score of 3.2/5 within France. Rotten Tomatoes has an aggregated score of 79% based on 11 positive and negative critic reviews.

Boyd van Hoeij of The Hollywood Reporter wrote: "Both tonally and esthetically, the film's clearly a new twig on the family tree that started somewhere before Jacques Tati and branched out to include works from such noted French-language filmmakers as Jacques Demy, Jaco Van Dormael, Jean-Pierre Jeunet and Michel Gondry. With its eye-popping production and costume design; its heavily vintage-leaning musical arrangements (co-composed by Chomet); characters breaking out into song and its constant oscillation between wondrous joy and heartfelt melancholy, Marcel fits right in and should be able to drum up significant interest on home turf." Hoeij continued: "Carlos Conti's production design feels whimsical but organic and is completely in synch with Olivier Beriot's costume design. ... The score and songs (most of them explicitly composed for the film) also evoke times past."
