= The Illusionist (2010 film) =

2010 animated film by Sylvain Chomet

- Theatrical release poster
- French: L'Illusionniste
- Directed by: Sylvain Chomet
- Written by: Sylvain Chomet (Note: The original script was written by Jacques Tati)
- Produced by: Sally Chomet; Bob Last
- Starring: Jean-Claude Donda; Eilidh Rankin
- Edited by: Sylvain Chomet
- Music by: Sylvain Chomet
- Production companies: Pathé; Django Films; Allied Filmmakers
- Distributed by: Pathé Distribution (France); Warner Bros. Entertainment UK (United Kingdom)
- Release dates: 16 June 2010 (France); 20 August 2010 (United Kingdom)
- Running time: 79 minutes
- Countries: France; United Kingdom
- Languages: French; English; Gaelic
- Budget: $17 million
- Box office: $6 million

The Illusionist (French: L'Illusionniste) is a 2010 French-British animated comedy-drama film written and directed by Sylvain Chomet and based on an unproduced script written by French filmmaker and mime Jacques Tati in 1956. Set in the late 1950s, the story follows an aging stage illusionist whose act is overshadowed by the rising popularity of rock and roll, prompting him to visit an isolated Scottish community where he bonds with a young woman who is convinced he is a real magician.

Controversy surrounds Tati's motivation for the script, which was written as a personal letter to his estranged eldest daughter, Helga Marie-Jeanne Schiel, in collaboration with his long-term writing partner Henri Marquet, between writing for the films Mon Oncle and Play Time. Chomet relocated the film, originally intended by Tati to be set in Czechoslovakia, to Scotland in the late 1950s. According to the director, "It's not a romance, it's more the relationship between a dad and a daughter." Sony's US press kit declares that the "script for The Illusionist was originally written by French comedy genius and cinema legend Jacques Tati as a love letter from a father to his daughter, but never produced". The film received acclaim from critics, and was nominated for both Academy Award for Best Animated Feature and Annie Award for Best Animated Feature, losing to Pixar's Toy Story 3 & DreamWorks' How to Train Your Dragon, respectively.

== Plot ==
In 1959 Paris, an out-of-work illusionist packs his belongings, including an ill-tempered rabbit, and moves to London. Unable to compete with modern entertainment such as rock and roll, he plies his trade at smaller gatherings in bars, cafés, and parties. He accepts the invitation of a drunken party patron to visit a remote Scottish island, where he entertains the locals. Staying in a room above the pub, he meets a girl, Alice, who is captivated by his illusions and kindness, including a gift of red shoes.

Alice believes the downtrodden performer possesses genuine magical powers, and follows him to Edinburgh, where he performs at a modest theatre. They share a room in a run-down guest house favoured by other fading performers. The illusionist sleeps on a couch, and the girl keeps busy by cleaning and cooking food that she shares with the neighbours. The girl's affections even tame the rabbit, but the illusionist's increasingly meagre wages, spent on gifts for Alice, lead him to pawn his magic kit and secretly take on demeaning jobs.

Alice attracts the affection of a handsome young man. After the illusionist sees them walking together, he leaves her with money and a note stating "Magicians do not exist". He also releases the rabbit on Arthur's Seat, where it soon meets other rabbits. As Alice moves in with her boyfriend, the illusionist departs on a train hauled by a locomotive bearing the number 4472. On the train, he performs one last simple magic trick for a child.

== Production ==
According to the 2006 reading of the script at the London Film School introduced by Chomet, "The great French comic Jacques Tati wrote the script of The Illusionist and intended to make it as a live action film with his daughter". Catalogued in the Centre National de la Cinématographie archives under the impersonal moniker "Film Tati Nº 4", the script was passed to Chomet by the caretakers of Tati's oeuvre, Jérôme Deschamps and Macha Makeïeff after Chomet's previous film The Triplets of Belleville was premiered at the 2003 Cannes Film Festival. Chomet has said that Tati's youngest daughter, Sophie Tatischeff, had suggested an animated film when Chomet was seeking permission to use a clip from Tati's 1949 film Jour de fête as she did not want an actor to play her father. Sophie Tatischeff died on 27 October 2001, almost two years before the 11 June 2003 French release of The Triplets of Belleville.

=== Animation ===
The film was made at Chomet's Edinburgh film studio, Django Films, by an international group of animators directed by Paul Dutton, including Sydney Padua, Greg Manwaring and Jacques Muller. It was estimated to cost around £10 million and was funded by Pathé Pictures, but in a February 2010 press conference, Chomet said that it had ended up costing only $17 million (£8.5 million in early 2008). The Herald says 180 creatives were involved, 80 of whom had previously worked on The Triplets of Belleville. In The Scotsman, Chomet cites 300 people and 80 animators. The film was primarily animated in Scottish Studios in Edinburgh (Django Films) and Dundee (ink.digital), with further animation done in Paris and London. The animation scenes set in Paris were executed at Neomis Animation studio, where the animation department was directed by Antoine Antin and the clean-up department by Grégory Lecocq. Around 5% of the work (mainly inbetweening and clean-up) was completed in South Korea.

== Motives for the script ==
Controversy has dogged The Illusionist, with it being reported that "Tati was inspired to write the story in an attempt to reconcile with his eldest daughter, Helga Marie-Jeanne Schiel, whom he had abandoned when she was a baby. And although she's still alive today and may in fact be his only direct living relative, she is nowhere mentioned in the dedications, which has seriously annoyed some".

In January 2010, The Guardian published the article "Jacques Tati's lost film reveals family's pain" stating, "In 2000, the screenplay was handed over to Chomet by Tati's daughter, Sophie Tatischeff, two years before her death. Now, however, the family of Tati's illegitimate and estranged eldest child, Helga Marie-Jeanne Schiel, who lives in the north-east of England, are calling for the French director to give her credit as the true inspiration for the film. The script of L'illusionniste, they say, was Tati's response to the shame of having abandoned his first child [Schiel] and it remains the only public recognition of her existence. They accuse Chomet of attempting to airbrush out their painful family legacy again."

On 26 May 2010, renowned film critic Roger Ebert of the Chicago Sun-Times published a lengthy letter from Jacques Tati's middle grandson, Richard McDonald, that pinpointed historical events in the private life of Jacques Tati that the family believe were his remorseful, melancholy inspiration to write, yet never make, L'Illusionniste.

Chomet has a different opinion about the film's origins, although acknowledging: "I never got to meet Sophie, or even speak to her about the script." Chomet said, "I think Tati wrote the script for Sophie Tatischeff. I think he felt guilty that he spent too long away from his daughter when he was working."

In a June 2010 interview for The National, Chomet gave his personal reasons for his attraction to the script: "I have two young children, a four-year-old and a two-year-old. But I also have a daughter who is 17 whom I don't live with because I separated from her mother. She was 12 when I started the project and you can feel things changing." This appears to mirror the regret of a broken paternal relationship that Tati had with his own daughter Helga Marie-Jeanne Schiel. Of the story, Chomet commented that he "fully understood why [Tati] had not brought [The Illusionist] to the screen. It was too close to him, and spoke of things he knew only too well, preferring to hide behind the figure of Monsieur Hulot".

Having corresponded with Tati's grandson, former Tati colleague and Chicago Reader film reviewer Jonathan Rosenbaum published an article entitled "Why I can't write about The Illusionist" in which he wrote, "Even after acknowledging that Chomet does have a poetic flair for composing in long shot that's somewhat Tatiesque, I remain skeptical about the sentimental watering-down of his art that Chomet is clearly involved with, which invariably gives short shrift to the more radical aspects of his vision". With McDonald being quoted saying, "My grandmother and all his stage acquaintances during the 1930s/40s always maintained that [Tati] was a great colleague as a friend and artist; he unfortunately just made a massive mistake that because of the time and circumstances he was never able to correctly address. I am sure his remorse hung heavy within him and it is for this reason that I believe Chomet's adaptation of l'Illusionniste does a great discredit to the artist that was Tati."

== Release ==
The first footage from the film was shown at the 2008 Cannes Film Festival. The film premiered at the Berlinale festival in February 2010. The film opened the 2010 Edinburgh International Film Festival on 16 June.

Pathé Distribution managed distribution for France and the UK, and distribution deals were secured for Lithuania (ACME Film), Japan (Klockworx), Italy (Cinema 11), Greece (Nutopia), the United States (Sony Pictures Classics), Benelux (Paradiso), Russia and the Middle East (Phars Film). The first official trailer for the film was in Russian and was released on 13 March 2010. The film was released in France on 16 May 2010.

The Illusionist was then released on DVD by Pathé through 20th Century Fox Home Entertainment in 2011. As of 2021, Warner Bros. Home Entertainment UK is currently re-printing under licence from Pathé. It was also then released on Japanese home media by Walt Disney Studios Japan through the Ghibli Museum Library.

== Reception ==
=== Box office ===
The film opened in 84 French cinemas. According to Box Office Mojo, the film released in France on 16 June 2010 entered the box office chart at #8, with a revenue of €485,030 ($600,099) in the first weekend.

The Illusionist opened in the United Kingdom in 42 cinemas (August 2010). It entered the UK box office at #15, with revenue of £161,900 one place behind Disney's Tinker Bell and the Great Fairy Rescue, the chart dominated by Sylvester Stallone's The Expendables which grossed £3,910,596 in revenue in its first weekend of release.

=== Critical response ===
As of October 2021, the film holds a 90% approval rating on Rotten Tomatoes, based on 134 reviews with an average rating of 8/10. Its critical consensus states: "An engrossing love letter to fans of adult animation, The Illusionist offers a fine antidote to garish mainstream fare." It also has a score of 82 out of 100 on Metacritic, based on 31 critics, indicating "universal acclaim".

In Télérama, Cécile Mury gave the film a rating of four stars out of five. Mury compared it to the director's previous feature film: "This Illusionist is as tender and contemplative as the Triplets were farcical and uneasy. But we find the oblique look, the talent that is particular of Sylvain Chomet. ... This world of yesterday fleets between realism and poetry." Christophe Carrière of L'Express was not fully convinced by Chomet's directing, finding the story clever, but "blunted when Chomet lets himself be submerged by Tati's melancholy, delivering more of a homage to a master than a personal adaption. Nevertheless, it is otherwise a beautiful work, with impeccable graphics and provides some stunning sequences (based on carnivorous rabbit stew ...). One would have liked a little bit more, that's all."

Jonathan Meville of The Scotsman wrote: "Edinburgh's skyline has never looked so good, and if the city didn't exist it would be hard to believe somewhere so beautiful was real: if locals aren't inspired to take a walk up North Bridge or down Victoria Street after this, they never will be." Whilst also in The Scotsman Alistair Harkness commented that "Once you strip away the overwhelming wow factor of the film's design, the absence of strong characterisation ensures the end result is bleaker and less affecting than was probably intended".

Tati's biographer, David Bellos, reviewing The Illusionist in Senses of Cinema was highly critical of Chomet's adaptation stating "the film is a disaster". "The great disappointment for me and I think for all viewers is that what Chomet does with the material is… well, nothing. The story he tells is no more than the sketchily sentimental plotline of L'Illusionniste. It's really very sad. All that artistry, all that effort, and all that money… for this".

Reviewing The Illusionist in The New Yorker, Richard Brody commented "Sylvain Chomet (The Triplets of Belleville) has directed an animated adaptation of Jacques Tati's 1956 screenplay, with none of Tati's visual wit or wild invention". "Chomet reduces Tati's vast and bilious comic vision to cloying sentimentality. The result is a cliché-riddled nostalgia trip".

Roger Ebert in his review wrote, "However much it conceals the real-life events that inspired it, it lives and breathes on its own, and as an extension of the mysterious whimsy of Tati". Calling it the "magically melancholy final act of Jacques Tati's career", he gave it four stars out of four.

=== Accolades ===
The film won the 2010 European Film Awards and was nominated at the 68th Golden Globe Awards for Best Animated Feature Film. On 25 February 2011, The Illusionist won the first César Award for Best Animated Feature.

It was nominated for Best Animated Feature Film in the 83rd Academy Awards, but lost to Toy Story 3; and an Annie Award for Best Animated Feature, losing to How to Train Your Dragon.

== See also ==
- Lists of animated films
- Magic: A Fantastic Comedy
