= Les Frères Jacques =

French vocal group

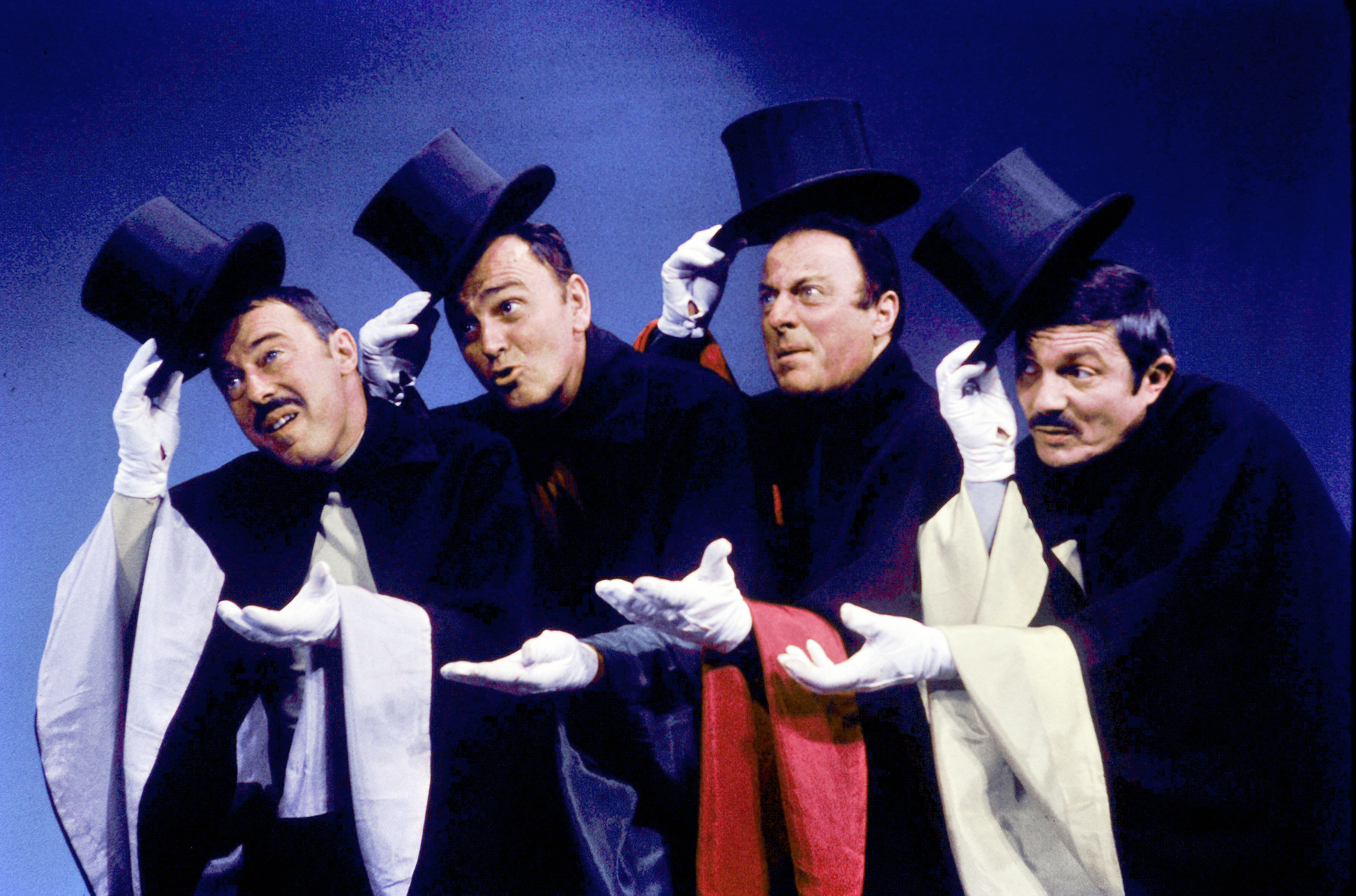
Les Frères Jacques in 1968.

Les Frères Jacques were a French vocal quartet active from 1946 to 1982, comprising André Bellec, Georges Bellec, François Soubeyran, and Paul Tourenne.

== Albums ==
- Mythologie, Arion 1979
- ’’Jacques Prevert’’, RyM Musique 1958
