= Sylvain Chomet =

French comic writer, animator, film director (born 1963)

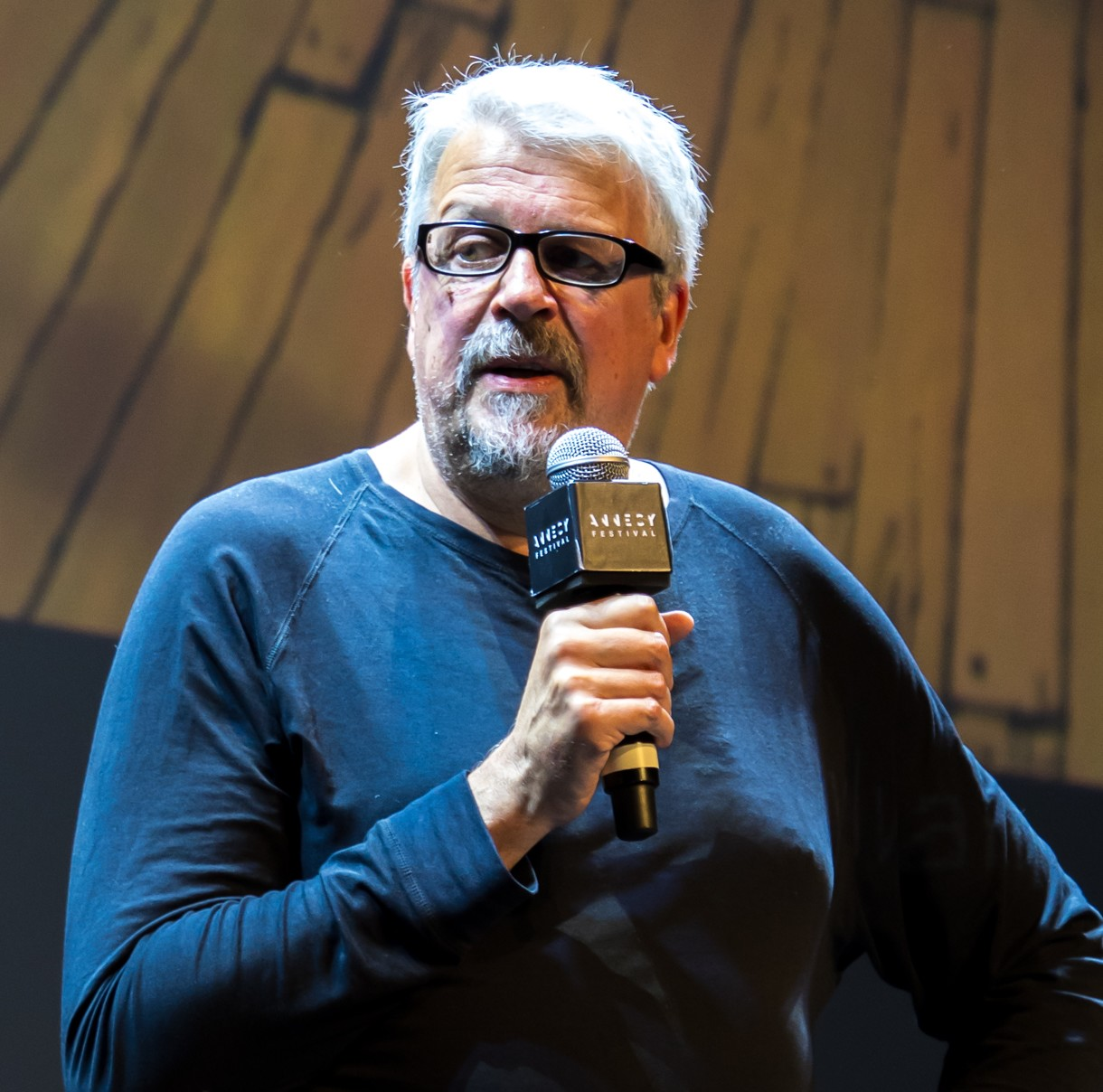
- Chomet in 2025
- Born: 10 November 1963 (age 63); Maisons-Laffitte, France
- Occupations: Comic writer; animator; film director
- Notable work: The Triplets of Belleville; The Illusionist
- Spouse: Sally Chomet

Sylvain Chomet (French: [silvɛ̃ ʃɔmɛ]; born 10 November 1963) is a French comic writer, animator and film director.

== Early career ==
Born in Maisons-Laffitte, Seine-et-Oise (now Yvelines), near Paris, he studied art at high school until he graduated in 1982. Chomet moved to London in 1988 to work as an animator at the Richard Purdum studio. In September of that year, he established a freelance practice, working on commercials for clients such as Principality, Renault, Swinton and Swissair.

In addition to his animation career, Chomet has created many print comics, starting in 1986 with Secrets of the Dragonfly. In 1992 Chomet wrote the script for a science fiction comic called The Bridge in Mud. 1993 saw Chomet writing the story for Léon-la-Came, which was drawn by Nicolas de Crécy for À Suivre magazine. This was published in 1995 and won the René Goscinny Prize in 1996. In 1997, Chomet published Ugly, Poor, and Sick, again with de Crécy. This won them the Alph-Art Best Comic Prize at the Angoulême Comics Festival.

== Film career ==
In 1991, Chomet started work on his first animated film, The Old Lady and the Pigeons, with backgrounds designed by Nicolas de Crécy. The short film won him a BAFTA, the Grand Prize at the 1997 Annecy International Animated Film Festival, the Cartoon d'or prize, as well as the Audience Prize and Jury Prize at the Angers Premiers Plans Festival. It also received a nomination for an Academy Award for Best Animated Short Film.

Chomet's first feature-length animated film, The Triplets of Belleville was also nominated for two Oscars in 2003 (Best Animated Feature and Best Song), and introduced Chomet's name to a much wider audience. Upon the film's release, de Crécy accused Chomet of plagiarizing his work, citing it as the reason for the dissolution of their collaboration. The visual style of The Triplets of Belleville closely resembles the earlier work of de Crécy's 1994 graphic novel Le Bibendum Céleste.

In 2004, Chomet founded Django Films, an animation studio based in Edinburgh, Scotland. The studio was set up with the ambition of establishing itself in both animation and live-action filmmaking, but has since been dismantled due to several production difficulties, first losing funding for what was to be the studio's first animated feature, Barbacoa, to have been directed by Chomet. Another major setback was the studio's failure to secure funding for The Clan, an animated sitcom for BBC.

In 2006, he directed a segment for the collaborative film Paris, je t'aime; he was assigned the 7th arrondissement of Paris segment "Tour Eiffel". It was Chomet's first work in live action.

After many delays, Chomet directed The Illusionist, which premiered at the 60th Berlin International Film Festival in February 2010. The film was based on an unproduced script that Jacques Tati had written in 1956 as a personal letter to his estranged eldest daughter and stars an animated version of Tati himself. It was originally conceived by Tati as a journey of love and discovery that takes two characters across Western Europe to Prague. Chomet says that "Tati wanted to move from purely visual comedy and try an emotionally deeper story" and states that "It's not a romance, it's more the relationship between a dad and a daughter". The film cost an estimated $17 million to make, and was funded by Pathé Pictures.

Filming on Chomet's live action romantic musical-comedy Attila Marcel took place in Paris from mid-July 2012 and lasted 46 days. It premiered in the Special Presentation section at the 2013 Toronto International Film Festival, and was released theatrically in France by Pathé in October that year.

In 2014, a couch gag directed and composed by Chomet aired for The Simpsons episode "Diggs". It depicts the family running to the couch until the lights go off. Marge leaves to fix the fuse, and when the lights go up, the characters are drawn Triplets of Belleville-style and everything has a French aesthetic to it. Bart plays with a do-it-yourself foie gras kit, Lisa plays an accordion, Marge cries out, "Maggie? Où est Maggie?" and Homer gets up and eats a snail off the TV, oblivious that Maggie is stuck between his butt cheeks.

In 2015, Chomet directed and co-wrote the animated music video "Carmen" for Belgian musician Stromae.

In 2016, Chomet directed the short film Merci Monsieur Imada. Later that year, Chomet produced the illustrations for Caleb's Cab, a children's book written by his wife, Sally.

In June 2021, it was announced that Chomet would direct a Marcel Pagnol biopic, A Magnificent Life.

=== Unrealized and upcoming projects ===
In 2004, Chomet announced plans to direct Barbacoa, a film about a group of escaped zoo animals set during the 1871 Paris Commune produced by Django Films. Originally stated to be released in late 2005, the film was canceled because of lack of funding. Another production, an unnamed 3D project in collaboration with Miramax division Dimension Films, was also announced.

In 2006, Django Films was reported to be producing The Clan, an animated sitcom pilot for BBC to be directed by Chomet. The show, described as "manic" and "surreal", was to have focused on the lives of the dysfunctional inhabitants of a fictional Scottish island, and was labeled "a Scottish Simpsons".

In the mid-2000s, Chomet was hired to direct The Tale of Despereaux. The film's production was marred by disagreements and malpractice, or accusations thereof, between the French, British and North American staff involved. Chomet came up against creative and ethical differences with the producers and was eventually fired from the project and thrown out of the studio space allocated to the film. The film was ultimately directed by Sam Fell and Rob Stevenhagen.

In 2012, Chomet was in the early stages of working on a prequel to The Triplets of Belleville entitled Swing Poppa Swing to focus on the early lives of the elderly singing triplets from the first film.

In 2014, Chomet announced plans to direct The Thousand Miles, a mix of live-action and animation based on various works of Federico Fellini, including his "unpublished drawings and writings", with a screenplay by Tommaso Rossellini and Demian Gregory. Work was later developed to include producer credit from Emanuele Filiberto of Savoy. On January 5, 2016, Variety reported that Chomet was moving forward with the film after a lengthy development process, and was expected for a 2017 release. Since then, there has been no news.

In March 2018, it was reported that Chomet would direct an animated adaptation of Hwang Sok-yong's novel Familiar Things. Chomet was inspired to adapt the novel after becoming interested in Korean culture particularly after seeing the films of Park Chan-wook.

== Filmography ==
Year	Original French Title	English Title	Director	Writer	Composer	Other	Notes
1997	La vieille dame et les pigeons	The Old Lady and the Pigeons	Yes	Yes	No	Yes (Note: Also animation director, animator and storyboard artist)	Short film
2003	Les Triplettes de Belleville	The Triplets of Belleville	Yes	Yes	No	Yes (Note: Also animation director, animator and character designer)	
2006	Paris, je t'aime	Paris, I Love You	Partial	Partial	No	No	Segment: "Tour Eiffel"
2010	L'Illusionniste	The Illusionist	Yes	Yes	Yes	Yes (Note: Also editor and character designer)	
2013	Attila Marcel	—N/a	Yes	Yes	No	No	
2014	—N/a	The Simpsons	Partial	No	Partial	No	Couch gag for episode "Diggs"
2016	Merci Monsieur Imada	Thank You Mister Imada	Yes	Yes	Yes	No	Short film
2024	—N/a	Joker: Folie à Deux	Partial	No	No	No	Opening sequence
2025	Marcel et Monsieur Pagnol	A Magnificent Life	Yes	Yes	No	No	
