= WIFF Prize in Canadian Film =

The WIFF Prize in Canadian Film is an annual film award, presented by the Windsor International Film Festival to a film selected by its jury as the best film among the ten films screening in its annual competition for Canadian films.

The award was introduced in 2019, initially offering a prize of $10,000 to the winner.

Due to the COVID-19 pandemic, the award was not presented in 2020 or 2021 due to the cancellation of the regular festival. Although in both years the festival staged special drive-in editions in lieu of the regular festival, it did not present awards. When the festival and award returned in 2022, the prize was increased to $25,000, becoming one of the largest monetary prizes in the Canadian film industry.

The award is open to both narrative and documentary films.

== Winners and nominees ==
| Year | Film | Director | Ref |
|---|---|---|---|
| 2019 | Kuessipan | Myriam Verreault | |
| 2019 | And the Birds Rained Down (Il pleuvait des oiseaux) | Louise Archambault | |
| 2019 | Antigone | Sophie Deraspe | |
| 2019 | Castle in the Ground | Joey Klein | |
| 2019 | Easy Land | Sanja Živković | |
| 2019 | Gordon Lightfoot: If You Could Read My Mind | Martha Kehoe, Joan Tosoni | |
| 2019 | Jordan River Anderson, the Messenger | Alanis Obomsawin | |
| 2019 | Matthias & Maxime | Xavier Dolan | |
| 2019 | Prey | Matt Gallagher | |
| 2019 | Willie | Laurence Mathieu-Léger | |
| 2020 | Award not presented due to the COVID-19 pandemic in Canada. | | |
| 2021 | Award not presented due to the COVID-19 pandemic in Canada. | | |
| 2022 | Riceboy Sleeps | Anthony Shim | |
| 2022 | Brother | Clement Virgo | |
| 2022 | Eternal Spring | Jason Loftus | |
| 2022 | Falcon Lake | Charlotte Le Bon | |
| 2022 | I Like Movies | Chandler Levack | |
| 2022 | Norbourg | Maxime Giroux | |
| 2022 | North of Normal | Carly Stone | |
| 2022 | Something You Said Last Night | Luis De Filippis | |
| 2022 | The Swearing Jar | Lindsay MacKay | |
| 2022 | To Kill a Tiger | Nisha Pahuja | |
| 2023 | Humanist Vampire Seeking Consenting Suicidal Person (Vampire humaniste cherche suicidaire consentant) | Ariane Louis-Seize | |
| 2023 | BlackBerry | Matt Johnson | |
| 2023 | The Dishwasher (Le Plongeur) | Francis Leclerc | |
| 2023 | Frontiers (Frontières) | Guy Édoin | |
| 2023 | Irena's Vow | Louise Archambault | |
| 2023 | My Mother's Men (Les hommes de ma mère) | Anik Jean | |
| 2023 | The Nature of Love (Simple comme Sylvain) | Monia Chokri | |
| 2023 | One Summer (Le temps d'un été) | Louise Archambault | |
| 2023 | Seven Veils | Atom Egoyan | |
| 2023 | Solo | Sophie Dupuis | |
| 2024 | Who Do I Belong To | Meryam Joobeur | |
| 2024 | Any Other Way: The Jackie Shane Story | Michael Mabbott, Lucah Rosenberg-Lee | |
| 2024 | Hunting Daze (Jour de chassse) | Annick Blanc | |
| 2024 | Lucy Grizzli Sophie | Anne Émond | |
| 2024 | On Earth as in Heaven (Sur la terre comme au ciel) | Nathalie Saint-Pierre | |
| 2024 | Paying for It | Sook-Yin Lee | |
| 2024 | Really Happy Someday | J Stevens | |
| 2024 | Russians at War | Anastasia Trofimova | |
| 2024 | Sharp Corner | Jason Buxton | |
| 2024 | Universal Language (Une langue universelle) | Matthew Rankin | |
| 2025 | Montreal, My Beautiful (Montréal, ma belle) | Xiaodan He | |
| 2025 | Compulsive Liar 2 (Menteuse) | Émile Gaudreault | |
| 2025 | The Cost of Heaven (Gagne ton ciel) | Mathieu Denis | |
| 2025 | In Cold Light | Maxime Giroux | |
| 2025 | Lovely Day (Mille secrets mille dangers) | Philippe Falardeau | |
| 2025 | Peak Everything (Amour Apocalypse) | Anne Émond | |
| 2025 | The Pitch | Michèle Hozer | |
| 2025 | Shamed | Matt Gallagher | |
| 2025 | Two Women (Deux femmes en or) | Chloé Robichaud | |
| 2025 | Where Souls Go (Où vont les âmes) | Brigitte Poupart | |
| 2026 | Ladies and Gentlemen, Brian Mulroney | Matthew Rankin | |
| 2026 | Ba's Book | Ashley Duong | |
| 2026 | Haunted (Hantée) | Rafaël Ouellet | |
| 2026 | Julián | Louise Bagnall | |
| 2026 | Nekai Walks | Rico King | |
| 2026 | Neverman | Rodrigo Barriuso | |
| 2026 | Nina Roza | Geneviève Dulude-De Celles | |
| 2026 | Pauline (Pauline Julien: femme pays) | Anaïs Barbeau-Lavalette | |
| 2026 | Run Terry Run | Sean Menard | |
| 2026 | You Will Be Free (Ma fille tu seras libre) | Bachir Bensaddek | |

== Juries ==
| Year | Jury |
|---|---|
| 2019 | Karen Bruce, Isabelle Corriveau, Joshua Riehl |
| 2022 | Magali Simard, Jason Gorber, Sally Lee, Joanna Miles, Glenn Sumi |
| 2023 | Steve Gravestock, Kerri Craddock, Maxime Giroux, Peter Howell, Tiffany Hsiung |
| 2024 | Don McKellar, Aisling Chin-Yee, Joey Klein, Andrew Murphy, Srimati Sen |
| 2025 | Charles Tremblay, Paul Barkin, Manon Dumais, Tanya Mason, Chelsea McMullan |
| 2026 | Rachel Ho, Chris Knight, Michael Mabbott, Barbara Ulrich, Danish Vahidy |
