= Shamed (film) =

2025 Canadian documentary film

- Directed by: Matt Gallagher
- Produced by: Cornelia Principe
- Starring: Jason Nassr
- Cinematography: Sasha Appler
- Edited by: Nick Hector
- Production company: Border City Pictures
- Distributed by: TVOntario
- Release date: April 28, 2025 (Hot Docs)
- Running time: 90 minutes
- Country: Canada
- Language: English

Shamed is a Canadian documentary film, directed by Matt Gallagher and released in 2025. The film centres on Jason Nassr, a man from Windsor, Ontario, who set up his own internet vigilante operation to expose purported child predators in the 2010s. Uploading videos to his "Creeper Hunter TV" channel on YouTube of himself using catfishing techniques to entrap men by posing as an underage girl, his tactics led to many of the "exposed" men facing violent harassment, with several of them committing suicide, and ultimately led to Nassr being convicted on charges of extortion, harassment and child pornography.

The film blends both Nassr's own perspective on his actions, and that of several families who have been irrevocably impacted by his "exposure" of a family member.

== Production ==
Gallagher called the film "the most difficult documentary I have ever made", owing both to the challenges of getting people to participate and the need to balance the moral complexities of the situation. He also noted that "the story's not so much about Jason. It's about the collateral damage that happens when a man like Jason is allowed to operate."

== Distribution ==
The film premiered at the 2025 Hot Docs Canadian International Documentary Festival, and was screened at several other Canadian film festivals before being broadcast by TVOntario, both on television and on its streaming service, in January 2026.

Although he had originally agreed to participate in the film, once it was clear that the film did not unequivocally present Nassr as a hero he began using various tactics to prevent its distribution. This included crashing the 2025 Forest City Film Festival in an attempt to disrupt their screening, for which he faced criminal charges; sending cease-and-desist letters to the Windsor International Film Festival to prevent its screening there, and to TVO to prevent its 2026 broadcast; and releasing a new series of YouTube videos criticizing Gallagher and Principe for purported, but unsubstantiated, inaccuracies and misrepresentations in the film.

None of the threatened organizations cancelled their screenings, and none has faced any further legal action as of September 2026.

== Critical response ==
For Point of View, Pat Mullen called the film "a prescient parable of what it means to be tried and crucified in the court of public opinion when any person with a platform wields the power of judge, jury, and executioner with one click."

== Awards ==
Award	Date of ceremony	Category	Nominee(s)	Result	Ref.
Directors Guild of Canada	2025	Best Picture Editing, Documentary	Nick Hector	Nominated	
Windsor International Film Festival	2025	WIFF Prize in Canadian Film	Matt Gallagher	Nominated	
