= Ba's Book =

2026 Canadian documentary film

- Directed by: Ashley Duong
- Written by: Ashley Duong; Steven Sych
- Produced by: Ina Fichman; Ashley Duong
- Cinematography: Mrinal Desai
- Edited by: Anouk Deschênes; Ashley Duong
- Music by: Peter Venne
- Production company: Intuitive Pictures
- Release date: September 15, 2026 (TIFF)
- Running time: 93 minutes
- Country: Canada
- Languages: English; Vietnamese

Ba's Book is a Canadian documentary film, directed by Ashley Duong and released in 2026. The film is a portrait of her Vietnamese Canadian family, as they stage a theatrical adaptation of her father Anh Duong's published memoir Dear Da-Lê: A Father's Memoir of the Vietnam War and the Iranian Revolution in Vietnam.

The film premiered in the TIFF Docs program at the 2026 Toronto International Film Festival. It was also screened in the Grierson Awards documentary competition at the 2026 BFI London Film Festival, at the Windsor International Film Festival in competition for the $25,000 WIFF Prize in Canadian Film, and as the closing film of the 2026 Montreal International Documentary Festival.
