= Adrianne and the Castle =

2024 Canadian documentary film

- Film poster
- Directed by: Shannon Walsh
- Written by: Shannon Walsh; Laurel Sprengelmeyer
- Produced by: Ina Fichman
- Starring: Alan St. George
- Cinematography: Pablo Alvarez-Mesa
- Edited by: Sophie Farkas Bolla
- Music by: Richard Reed Parry
- Production company: Intuitive Pictures
- Release date: March 9, 2024 (SXSW)
- Running time: 86 minutes
- Country: Canada
- Language: English

Adrianne and the Castle is a 2024 Canadian documentary film, directed by Shannon Walsh.

== Premise ==
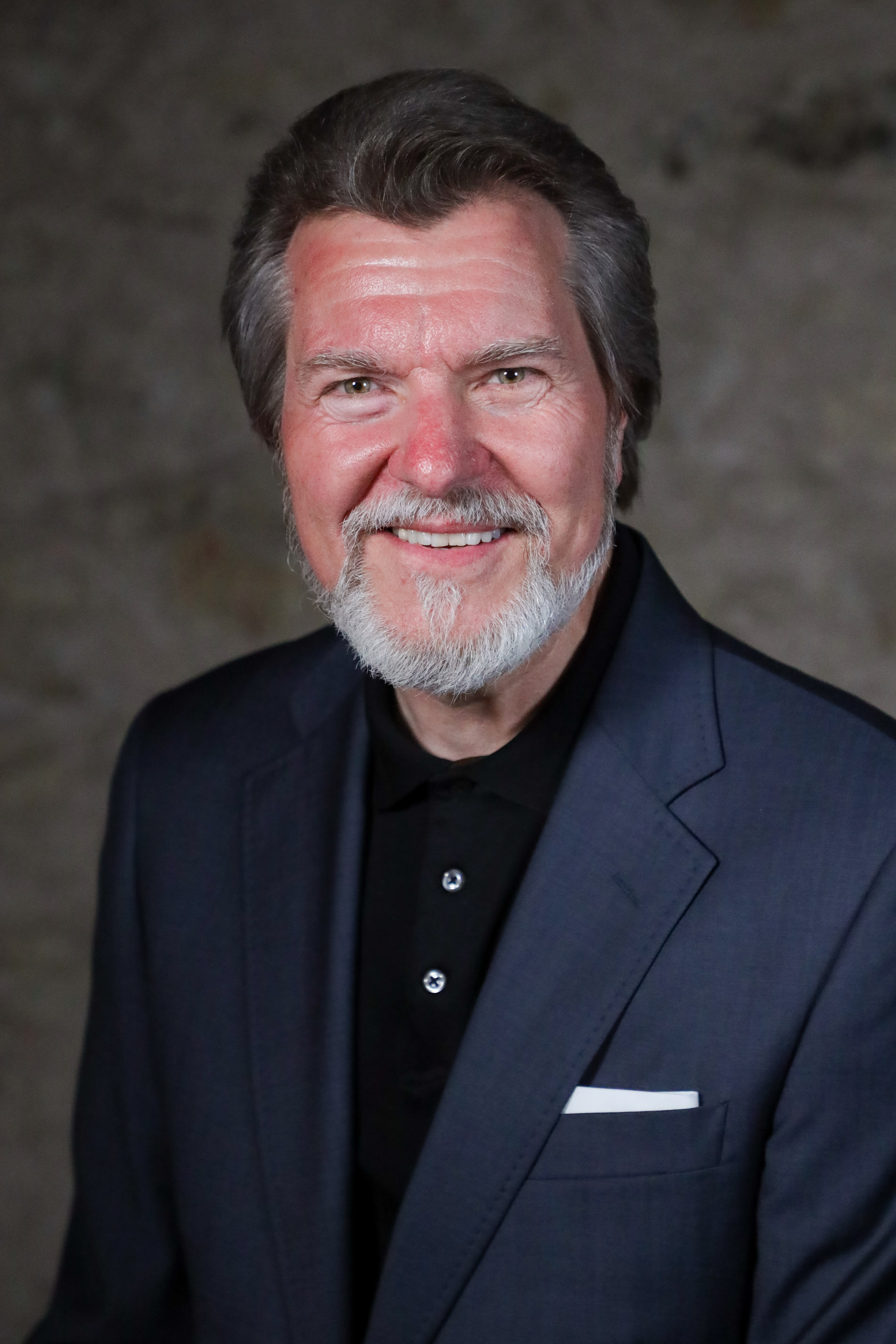
Alan St. George at SXSW 2024

The film profiles Alan St. George, a man who maintains his home in rural Illinois as a shrine to his late wife Adrianne, including musical re-enactments of scenes from their earlier lives together performed by actors Nathan McDonald and SLee.

== Release ==
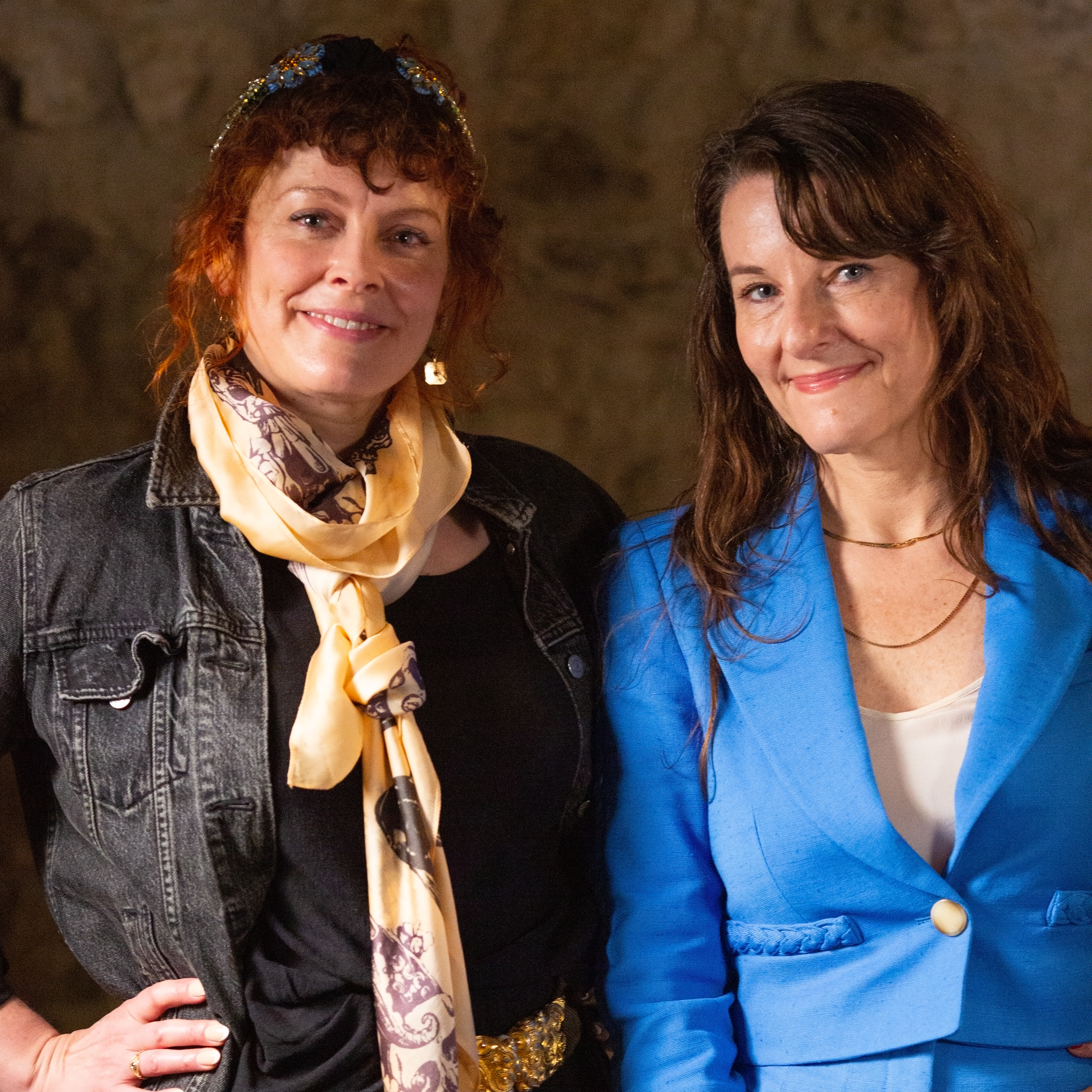
Laurel Sprengelmeyer and Shannon Walsh at SXSW 2024

The film premiered at the 2024 SXSW festival, and had its Canadian premiere at the 2024 Hot Docs Canadian International Documentary Festival. It also screened as the opening film of the 2024 DOXA Documentary Film Festival, prior to playing at the 28th Fantasia International Film Festival on July 20, 2024.

== Critical reception ==
Adrianne & the Castle received generally positive reviews, with critics praising its emotional depth and visual storytelling. On the review aggregator website Rotten Tomatoes, 67% of 12 critics' reviews are positive.

On RogerEbert.com, Clint Worthington wrote: "For all its wistful magic, Adrianne & the Castle is a film about grief and what happens when you lose the very thing that defined your life up to that point.

Grading the film A− on IndieWire, Lauren Wissot wrote: "Personally, I saw Adrianne & The Castle as a queer hetero love story between a female drag queen and her submissive partner, even if that very 21st century assessment feels totally out of sync with the couple’s turn-of-the-20th-century aristocratic lifestyle. And yet the ambiguity of Walsh’s film is also the greatest strength of the intoxicating story it tells in such intimate and specific detail, a story whose moral is to throw such mundane thinking aside and embrace the higher truth that love conquers all — doubt and death alike."
