= Ina Fichman =

Canadian film producer

- Born: Montreal, Quebec, Canada
- Occupation: Producer
- Years active: 2002–present

Ina Fichman is a Canadian film producer and president of Intuitive Pictures, based in Montreal. She is best known for the 2022 film Fire of Love.

She won the Gemini Award for Best History Documentary Program for Undying Love in 2003. She has been nominated for the 34th Producers Guild of America Awards, British Academy Film Awards, Emmy, Critics Choice Awards and Canadian Screen Awards. Fichman was the recipient of the Don Haig Award at the Hot Docs Canadian International Documentary Festival in 2018.

She is on the DOC Canada board of directors chair, a board member of the International Documentary Association and a member of The Academy of Motion Picture Arts and Sciences.

She was a producer for the film Fire of Love which was nominated in 2023 for an Oscar at the 95th Academy Awards for Best Documentary Feature.

== Filmography ==
- The Last Trip - 1994
- Undying Love - 2002
- S&M: Short and Male - 2008
- Malls R Us - 2009
- Mabul (The Flood) - 2010
- Inheritance - 2012
- Boredom - 2012
- Shekinah Rising - 2013
- 100% T-Shirt - 2014
- Monsoon - 2014
- The Wanted 18 - 2014
- Vita Activa: The Spirit of Hannah Arendt - 2015
- Judging Japan - 2016
- The Oslo Diaries - 2018
- Gift - 2018
- Laila at the Bridge - 2018
- Inside Lehman Brothers - 2018
- Don't Worry, the Doors Will Open - 2019
- Stray - 2020
- Once Upon a Sea - 2021
- The Gig Is Up - 2021
- Fanny: The Right to Rock - 2021
- Blue Box - 2021
- Gabor - 2021
- Fire of Love - 2022
- 7 Beats per Minute - 2024
- Adrianne and the Castle - 2024

== Awards and nominations ==
| Year | Category | Organization | Film | Result |
|---|---|---|---|---|
| 1995 | Donald Brittain Award | Gemini Awards | The Last Trip | Nominated |
| 2002 | Best History Documentary Program | Gemini Awards | Undying Love | Won |
| 2005 | Best Children's or Youth Non-Fiction Program or Series (producer) | Gemini Awards | My Brand New Life | Nominated |
| 2005 | Multiculture Award (producer) | Gémeaux Awards | My Brand New Life | Won |
| 2011 | Best Children's Feature Film | Asian Pacific Screen Awards | The Flood (Mabul) | Nominated |
| 2018 | Dalia Sigan Award, Best Script | Jerusalem Film Festival | The Oslo Diaries | Won |
| 2019 | Outstanding Historical Documentary | Emmy Awards | The Oslo Diaries | Nominated |
| 2021 | Old Oak Audience Choice Award | Forest City Film Festival | The Gig Is Up | Won |
| 2023 | Best Documentary | British Academy Film Awards | Fire of Love | Nominated |
| 2023 | Best Documentary Film | Chicago Indie Critics Award | Fire of Love | Won |
| 2023 | Outstanding Nonfiction Feature | Cinema Eye Honors | Fire of Love | Nominated |
| 2023 | Documentary Feature | 95th Academy Awards | Fire of Love | Nominated |
| 2023 | Documentary | Peabody Awards | Fire of Love | Won |
