= Pauline (2026 film) =

2026 Canadian drama film

- French: Pauline Julien: femme pays
- Directed by: Anaïs Barbeau-Lavalette
- Written by: Anaïs Barbeau-Lavalette; Véronique Côté
- Produced by: Étienne Hansez
- Starring: Suzanne Clément; Patrice Dubois
- Cinematography: Jonathan Decoste
- Edited by: Stéphane Lafleur
- Music by: Guido Del Fabbro; Émile Proulx-Cloutier
- Production company: Bravo Charlie
- Distributed by: Axia Films
- Release date: September 21, 2026 (Monument-National)
- Running time: 87 minutes
- Country: Canada
- Language: French

Pauline (French: Pauline Julien: femme pays) is a Canadian biographical drama film, directed by Anaïs Barbeau-Lavalette and released in 2026. The film is a portrait of Pauline Julien, a singer and Quebec sovereignty activist who was a significant figure in the musical and political history of Quebec.

The film stars Suzanne Clément as Julien and Patrice Dubois as her husband, poet Gérald Godin, as well as Violette Chauveau, Véronique Côté, Mario Dallaire, Éléonore Delvaux-Beaudoin, Alexa-Jeanne Dubé, Kathleen Fortin and Steve Gagnon in supporting roles.

== Production ==
Production of the film was first announced in 2023.

The film was shot in fall 2025 in Montreal and the Eastern Townships.

== Distribution ==
The film premiered on September 21, 2026, at the Monument-National theatre in Montreal, prior to opening commercially on September 25.

The film was screened at the Windsor International Film Festival, in competition for the $25,000 WIFF Prize in Canadian Film.
