= Nekai Walks =

2026 Canadian documentary film

- Directed by: Rico King
- Written by: Rico King; Allen Booth
- Produced by: David Mcilvride; David Paperny
- Starring: Nekai Foster; Devon Jones
- Cinematography: Ricardo Diaz
- Edited by: Eugene Weis
- Music by: Tyson Kuyeti
- Production company: Black King Entertainment
- Release date: April 24, 2026 (Hot Docs)
- Running time: 90 minutes
- Country: Canada
- Language: English

Nekai Walks is a Canadian documentary film, directed by Rico King and released in 2026. An exploration of gun violence in Canada, the film profiles Nekai Foster, a young Black Canadian man who was shot in the head as an innocent bystander in a drive-by shooting in the Jane and Finch district of Toronto, profiling both his recovery from his injuries and his emergence as a public anti-gun activist in the years following the incident, as well as Devon Jones, a community organizer who runs a neighbourhood program in Jane and Finch to keep youth from falling into gang-related crime.

In an essay for the Cutaways feature on CBC Arts, King wrote about the impact of meeting Foster and documenting his story.

The film premiered at the 2026 Hot Docs Canadian International Documentary Festival, where it was the winner of the Rogers Audience Award. It will also screen at the Windsor International Film Festival, in competition for the $25,000 WIFF Prize in Canadian Film.
