= Russians at War =

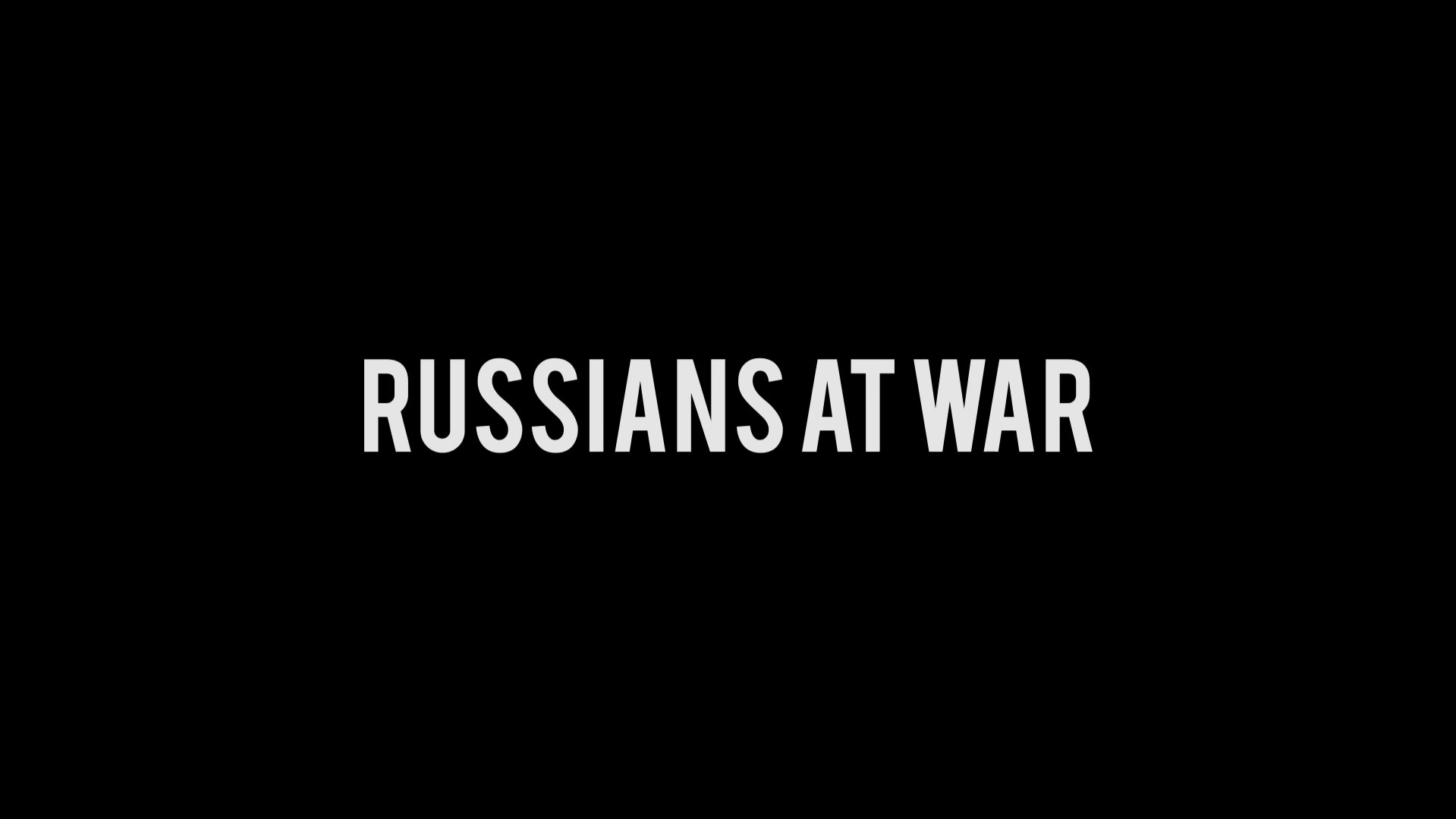
- Title card
- Directed by: Anastasia Trofimova
- Written by: Roland Schlimme
- Produced by: Cornelia Principe; Sally Blake; Philippe Levasseur
- Cinematography: Anastasia Trofimova
- Edited by: Roland Schlimme
- Music by: Amin Bouhafa
- Release date: September 5, 2024 (Venice)
- Countries: Canada; France
- Language: Russian

Russians at War is a 2024 documentary film, directed by Anastasia Trofimova. It records the Russian invasion of Ukraine during the Russo-Ukrainian War from the perspective of the invading Russian soldiers.

The documentary had its industry premiere on September 4, 2024, and for the public premiere on September 5, 2024 at the 81st Venice International Film Festival. The North American premiere for the film industry was on September 10, 2024 at the 2024 Toronto International Film Festival. The film was criticized as Russian propaganda by the Ukrainian government and various Ukrainian organizations, while the Toronto festival organizers defended the film as being "anti-war". The North American public premiere was planned for September 12. However, the premiere was postponed to September 17, with TIFF citing "significant threats" as reasons for the postponement. Toronto police were reported to be "not aware of any active threats".

== Synopsis ==
Shot in a fly-on-the-wall cinéma vérité style, Russians at War follows documentarian Anastasia Trofimova as she spends months following Russian soldiers from their homes to the frontlines of occupied Ukraine, with many of her subjects revealing feelings of confusion and disillusionment with their government.

Trofimova embedded herself with a Russian battalion, as it makes its way across eastern Ukraine, getting a rare glimpse of an often ramshackle army in a regular state of disarray.

Trofimova takes the audience from 180 km behind the front lines where ranks are "replenished" to the trenches of the front line where the men die. The soldiers depicted are often volunteers who say they went to the front for various personal reasons: vague patriotism, avenging fallen friends, protecting loved ones, preventing their children from going to war in the future, or, more commonly, for money. Soldiers are shown drinking heavily, and sometimes note the pointlessness "of it all". One notes that they only return dead.

== Production ==
Trofimova, Canadian producer Cornelia Principe and co-producer Sally Blake noted that the production of this film started as an anti-war project to reflect the perspective of Russian citizens and soldiers regarding their country's war in Ukraine. In an unexpected turn of events, Trofimova managed to follow a Russian soldier, whom she had met in a Moscow subway, on his way to the frontline. Taking advantage of a lax approach of local commanders, she eventually embedded herself with a Russian battalion, as it made its way across the Donetsk or Luhansk regions of Ukraine. The battalion suffered 600 casualties out of 900-people-strong battalion by the time Trofimova arrived, and their morale was low. With very limited internet access and telephone contacts, Trofimova, Principe and Blake had to improvise to secure the obtained footage.

Editing and post-production was conducted in Canada and France, with editor Roland Schlimme involved in shaping the film. French musician Amin Bouhafa produced the music for this film. According to The Kyiv Independent, the film received $340,000 (CAD) in funding from the Canada Media Fund.

Deadline Hollywood's Melanie Goodfellow described the film depicting "botched military sorties; hiding, petrified in dug outs; shrapnel-shredded dead comrades being slung into trucks in body bags, and commanders in shell shock as they relive the day’s horrors. Any initial patriotic fervor dissipates, with the handful of subjects who survive to the end of the film questioning why they are there and expressing their lack of desire to fight, but suggesting they have no choice but to follow orders."

== Release ==
At the beginning of October 2024, after several festival premieres were cancelled, film producers were "considering minor adjustments prior to the pending global release of Russians at War, including a factual, contextual card in the opening titles". Film producer Anastasia Trofimova said that "many of those denouncing the film have not even seen it".

=== Venice International Film Festival ===
The world premiere of “Russians at War” took place at the 81st Venice International Film Festival on September 5, 2024. The film received a five-minute standing ovation from the audience.

The Artistic Director of the Venice Film Festival Alberto Barbera defended the film from Ukrainian critics, noting that the film is "very far from being an act of propaganda" and that "it is an anti-war film, with a very sensible and touching human approach, as well as great artistic craftsmanship."

=== Toronto International Film Festival ===
The film had its North American premiere on September 17, 2024 at the 49th Toronto International Film Festival, immediately following the Venice Film Festival. The screening was surrounded by a noticeable social and political controversy. On September 10, 2024, the Ukrainian community held a protest outside the Scotiabank Theatre Toronto, where TIFF was holding the film's press screening. As some sources noted, none of the participants of this protest saw the film as it was only screened in closed venues in Venice, Italy a few days prior.

TIFF denied the request of the Ukrainian-Canadian community to exclude the film from the program and defended its decision in a statement released on September 11, noting that "in no way should this film be considered Russian propaganda" and that "as a cultural institution, we stand for the right of artists and cultural workers to express fair political comment freely and oppose censorship. Because filmmakers, like all artists, work in dynamic engagement with their societies, we believe that our role as curators and presenters of the film must stand for an unequivocal defense of artistic expression and a commitment to provide safe, open spaces to engage, critique and reflect on artists' work."

According to the TIFF organizers who talked to The Hollywood Reporter, "a number of former TIFF staffers had received numerous worrying inquiries requesting schematic floor plan diagrams of the Scotiabank Theatre, and precise details of its security arrangements for the entrance and exit of high-profile talent to and from the venue." TIFF CEO Cameron Bailey described that "in emails and phone calls, TIFF staff received hundreds of instances of verbal abuse. Our staff also received threats of violence, including threats of sexual violence. We were horrified, and our staff members were understandably frightened. We also learned of plans to disrupt or stop the screenings. Because last week’s screenings were scheduled at a 14-screen multiplex on some of the festival’s busiest days, we determined that it would be safer not to go ahead with those plans." In an unprecedented move for TIFF, on September 12 the festival announced that it was pausing the North American public premiere for the film citing "significant threats to festival operations and public safety". The pause resulted in the cancellation of three public screenings planned from September 13 to 15.

On September 15, TIFF announced that it had arranged the film's North-American premiere at two screenings on September 17, 2024 at the TIFF-owned Bell Lightbox Cultural Centre located in Downtown Toronto. During the screenings, there was a visibly enhanced presence of police and security personnel preventing any major interference from Ukrainian-Canadian protesters.

In his open speech before the screening on February 17, 2024, Cameron Bailey reiterated that Trofimova's film went through a "rigorous selection process and was invited based on its artistic merits and on its relevance to the horrific, ongoing war prompted by Russia’s illegal invasion of Ukraine." He added that "TIFF screened a number of docs from Ukrainian filmmakers at the 2022, 2023 and 2024 festivals, offering firsthand insights into said horrors. We are deeply sympathetic to the pain felt by Ukrainian Canadians at the violence and destruction caused by Russia’s invasion, but verbal abuse and threats of violence, in response to the screening of a film, cross a dangerous line. We’re presenting Russians at Wars to stand against that abuse, against those threats, and for the importance of media and curatorial independence."

Anita Lee, TIFF's Chief Programming Officer wrote that "Trofimova assembles a spellbinding tale of sacrifice and disillusionment in which soldiers resemble pawns in a nefarious game. Russians at War reminds us of the human cost on both sides. As Trofimova so eloquently puts it, 'the fog of war is so thick that you can't see the human stories it's made of.'"

=== Lunenburg Documentary Festival ===
The Lunenburg Documentary Festival in Lunenburg, Nova Scotia saw protests against the screening of the film with calls from the Ukrainian Canadian Congress to cancel its screening. In response to this protest, the festival issued a statement noting that "the film Russians at War was selected to provide further insight into a tragic conflict which is still ongoing. While not a comprehensive study of the invasion, it does provide a window to observe the devastating impact of distant political decisions on the lives of less powerful individuals."

Russians at War was screened at this festival on September 20, 2024.

=== Athens International Film Festival ===
The Greek premiere of this film was scheduled at the 30th International Documentary Film Competition of Athens Premiere Nights, Greece, taking place October 2 to 24, 2024.

=== Zurich Film Festival ===
The film was scheduled for four screenings at the Zurich Film Festival October 3 to 13, 2024. The organizers of this festival acknowledged receiving "protest letters" from the Ukrainian government. France 24 reported that the organizers released the following statement: “We can understand that the film evokes strong emotions in Ukrainians, but we will maintain its projection, because we consider that 'Russians at War' is an anti-war film". Keyston-ATS news agency also cited the director of ZFF Christian Jungen saying: "It was understandable that Ukrainians are unhappy", but insisted that "films should incite discussion". Jungen added that he considered the documentary an "anti-war film".

Ukraine's Ambassador to Switzerland Iryna Venediktova arranged a meeting with the ZFF Artistic Director Christian Jungen on September 24, 2024 and, as stated in her X post, "urged @zurichfilmfest to ban the screening of 'Russians at War' to avoid being weaponised by Russian propaganda."

On September 26, 2024, ZFF issued a statement that even though the film "will remain in the Documentary Film Competition of the ZFF", the festival cancelled the public screening of the film "due to safety reasons", adding that "the safety of its audience, guests, partners as well as the staff is the top priority."

In her interview with Die Weltwoche, Trofimova described the unprecedented threats to the festival organizers. The Swiss outlet Neue Zürcher Zeitung comments that "This leaves a bad taste in the mouth. The question arises as to how drastically official bodies have interfered. It is an unprecedented incident: one cannot remember a Swiss cultural institution ever being forced to take a similar step by foreign actors – especially by actors from a friendly state."

=== Windsor International Film Festival ===
The film was shown at the Windsor International Film Festival, which ran from October 24 to November 3, 2024. Executive director Vincent Georgie stated that "the film is there to create discussion and debates" and added that there would be additional security measures during the showings of the film.

=== Leuven Docville Film Festival ===
The film was scheduled to be screened at the Docville Festival in Leuven, but was called off following involvement by the Ukrainian Embassy. The embassy had urged various Belgian authorities, festival organizers, and the Catholic University of Leuven to stop the film's screening.

== Reception ==
=== Anti-war content ===
Deutsche Welle and others noted that the film is controversial. The producers say the film is anti-war. Critics criticize it for empathizing with invading Russian soldiers without judgment and for not informing the viewer on the Russian war crimes. On the other side, "Trofimova's film is considered one of the few documentary video evidence from the Russian side of the front."

The Hollywood Reporter noted, "running the gamut from left-wing to -right, the country’s three national newspapers — the Toronto Star, The Globe and Mail and the National Post — all published pieces praising the film (which this writer has seen) as a powerful anti-war polemic that portrays Russia’s infantry as inept and unmotivated, feeling betrayed and confused about why they are actually fighting".

- The Toronto Star's film critic Corey Atad gave the film 4 stars out of 4, noting that "Trofimova does challenge her subjects, prodding them with questions about their views, purpose and actions in the war", adding that "despite baseless accusations of Trofimova being a Russian state-backed operative, her matter-of-fact and mostly non-editorialized approach to capturing the drudgery and horror of the war experience is, for anyone convinced of Russia’s wrongdoing, understandably frustrating to watch", concluding that "charges of the film being Russian propaganda fall flat on their face. In fact, perhaps the most important audience for the film is the one least likely to see it: the Russian people."
- American film critic Jason Gorber of RogerEbert.com: "Not dissimilar to Erich Maria Remarque’s novel about German soldiers in the Great War, Trofimova’s film gives a welcome perspective at the level of the individual soldier".
- France's TV5Monde: "The film is deeply pacifist".
- Marsha Lederman from The Globe and Mail: "It shows, unvarnished, the horrors of the war, including some of the most horrific footage you will ever see on a big screen. This documentary in no way glorifies Russia or its army or its war effort. This film in no way demonizes Ukraine or its people".
- Canada's Point of View Magazine critic Pat Mullen encouraged people to "see the film before reviewing it", adding that "Russians at War affords remarkable access to tell a human story," going back to "that personal element of All Quiet on the Western Front — perhaps the greatest of anti-war works — and observes an awakening as some soldiers, and the families who grieve them, ask questions that are absent from the barracks in the early sees."
- Canadian journalist Justin Ling wrote that "to fully understand “Russians at War,” you must appreciate that it is neither documentary nor propaganda: It is Kino-Pravda, ‘film truth,’ a style pioneered by Russian filmmaker Dziga Vertov. Kino-Pravda sought to replace art and romanticism in cinema with scenes of real people living out the noble mundaneness of life." He further stated that the film "purports to break through the propaganda of Moscow’s brutal war, but instead it wallows in it", and "after watching the film and speaking to Trofimova, I’m here to tell you that the truth lies in between: It is not propaganda, but it is informed by it. It is anti-war, but not pro-peace."

=== Footage rarity ===
Most reviews acknowledged the professionalism and surprisingly rare access to the daily routines of soldiers fighting on the Russian side during the Ukrainian-Russian war:

- Jason Gorber of RogerEbert.com: "Anastasia Trofimova, provides a unique glimpse into the lives of the soldiers on what for them is the Western Front."
- Germany's DW News: "Trofimova's film is considered one of the few documentary video evidence from the Russian side of the front."
- Canada's The Globe and Mail: "Anastasia Trofimova’s film is no-holds-barred reproach of war in general… It is extraordinary".
- Canada's Toronto Star: "without casting aspersions on Trofimova’s personal beliefs about the war’s causes, the film is wholly uninterested in having that political-historical debate. Rather, what it offers is unfiltered insight into present conditions and contradictions. Importantly, Trofimova does challenge her subjects, prodding them with questions about their views, purpose and actions in the war".
- Germany's Frankfurter Allgemeine Zeitung: "Russians at War can clearly be read as an anti-war film. Trofimova shows that the Russians who are being used up in Ukraine are there primarily for financial reasons, that they have to continue fighting without pay after they have served their contracts. She shows how the propaganda has an impact, but also how cynicism and alcohol shape everything. And she shows that the Soviet Union still has an enormous influence. A young medic says that her worldview is shaped by the old films from that time, which she sees as "uncynical". She does not say the implication that she is serving in a cynical war, but it can be read in Russians at War. Trofimova is present in her film above all with her questions from off-screen. These are the simple questions that arise from a humanistic perspective."
- Canada's In The Seats: "the art of this film “is vital to … our understanding of the human condition on many different levels".
- Italy's Sentieriselvaggi: "Russians at War is one of the most interesting and fascinating films of the entire 2024 Film Festival", "one of the most interesting and courageous films of this edition".
- Zinaida Pronchenko from Radio Free Europe/Radio Liberty: "Regardless of the motives and conditions of filming, this is a unique material, the very 'trench truth' that is usually not visible behind the 'fog of war'." Pronchenko described the feelings from the film as fear and despair.
- Germany's ARD: "The film is an important contemporary document… Trofimova gave us a perspective that we rarely see".
- Film critics "Pravila Jisni" Egor Moskvitin, responding to the questions of the ‘Business FM’ channel considered the film "talented", praising "the trust of her characters to the film-maker" and "polarity of opinions of the characters in this film; they don’t offer one specific point of view on the events, not simplifying the documentary perspective of this film. The film had a positive reception (in Venice) because the producer managed to maintain the most important balance between publicism, giving her own view of the events and responsibility for her characters."

=== Trofimova's conduct ===
Many critics praised Trofimova’s bravery, calling the film "courageous".

The Globe and Mail evaluated the film as “a brave and exceptional documentary: “A talented filmmaker, without an official posting or even a press pass, followed Russian fighters, almost all the way to the front so that we could know about it. And be outraged. Not at the film; at the war.

TVO in their statement from September 6, 2024 praised the film pointing out that "it is unauthorized by Russian officials and was made at great personal risk to the filmmaker, who was under constant threat of arrest and incarceration for trying to tell an unofficial story." TVO called "Russians at War" "a documentary made in the tradition of independent war correspondence".

Trofimova agreed that the project was very risky for the soldiers and for herself personally, and she did not believe at every stage of this project that it was possible. She felt that an anti-war film like this was worth the risks and could be her contribution to ending the Russian-Ukrainian war.

== Controversy and political pressure ==
=== Protests ===
Ukrainian director Olha Zhurba noted that though she hasn't seen the film at the time of her statements expressed on September 4, 2024, she raised concerns about the film’s empathy towards Russian soldiers. Ukrainian producer Darya Bassel criticized the decision of the Venice Film Festival to screen Russians at War because the film "presents a very distorted picture of reality" and that Trofimova's documentary is "spreading false narratives". Bassel pointed out that the film pictures as Russian invasion started in 2022, while Russia invaded Ukraine in 2014; Trofimova claims that Russia wasn't at war for many years, while Russia participated in wars in Chechnya, Syria, Transnistria, Abkhazia and Georgia; people shown in film repeat Russian propaganda narratives about "Ukrainians are nazis" and "civil war in Ukraine". Bassel reminds that "you will feel pity for the people depicted as dying in the film", but "it is also important to remember that these individuals joined the army that invaded an independent country, many of them willingly, as we learn from the film." Bassel concludes that the film is "prime example of Russian propaganda".

Following these events, the film sparked backlash from some regional experts, Canadian politicians and members of the Ukrainian-Canadian community, who characterized it as "Russian propaganda". Trofimova admitted to entering Russian-occupied Ukrainian territories without Ukraine's permission while making the film, while embedded with Russian soldiers invading the country. Critics, including historian Ian Garner, noted that Trofimova's claim that she did not have official permission to film the soldiers "hardly stands up to scrutiny in a country where independent journalism simply does not exist" and that Trofimova absolved the soldiers of moral responsibility for war crimes such as rape, looting, and murder by presenting them as "blind kittens", and "helpless to intervene". Garner termed this an "alarming reiteration of the 'just following orders' narratives" that surrounded the Holocaust. Russian director Vitaly Mansky said that "it is quite obvious that the author is on the side of their heroes" and called the film's screening in Venice "a mistake by the festival." Mansky himself attempted to send a cameraman to film on the Russian side during the invasion, but his cameraman was promptly arrested.

Trofimova has been accused of whitewashing Russian war crimes. Ukraine's consul-general in Toronto, Oleh Nikolenko, urged the Toronto International Film Festival to not screen the documentary and criticized the Canadian government for helping to fund the documentary. Ukrainian MP Yevheniia Kravchuk stated that the film is a "striking example of how Russia, thanks to its soft power, is trying to promote its narratives about a ‘more comprehensive understanding of the war’. And unfortunately, they are doing this quite successfully."

Ukraine's consul-general in Toronto Oleh Nikolenko urged TIFF CEO Cameron Bailey to remove the film from the festival schedule and criticized the Canadian government for helping to fund the documentary.

Some members of the Ukrainian-Canadian community called for protests against its screening at TIFF, requesting removal the film from the program. Many journalists who talked to protesters noted that the majority of them "haven’t seen the film but screamed propaganda" even when it was eventually screened in Toronto. The Washington Post cited Ukrainian protesters saying that they bought tickets to each of the two screenings "not because they intended to go, but to prevent others from seeing it." Protesters admitted to not seeing it, saying "the trailer was enough", "I don’t want to listen to any stories, any explanations, any justifications from Russians", and "They are war criminals". Some Ukrainian protesters started watching the film, but didn’t finish watching. As German Frankfurter Allgemeine Zeitung pointed out, "most of the demonstrators had only seen the trailer, but suspected Russian propaganda. They would probably not take back the accusation even if they had seen the whole film.". "As is always the case," wrote the National Post, "the people who managed to get this film cancelled almost certainly haven’t seen it" . Point of View magazine wrote: "Protesters, who by all accounts hadn’t seen the film given the inaccuracies of their characterizations of it, decried the doc as Russian propaganda and picketed the first press and industry screening, which preceded the public events by several days. Which is a shame, since it’s a strong (if flawed) film and one example that showed how 2024 marked an exceptionally notable year for TIFF Docs."

Deputy Prime Minister of Canada Chrystia Freeland made a denouncing statement about Russians at War while speaking to reporters in Nanaimo, British Columbia on September 10, 2024. Following a request by the CBC, on September 16, 2024 she issued the statement saying: "I have seen the film", adding that "it's not right for Canadian public money to be supporting the screening and production of a film like this."

Canadian MP James Bezan submitted a petition to the Canadian Senate, stating that the film "paints a nice picture of how Russians are fighting in Ukraine" and requested an investigation of how Canadian Funds "were used to pay for this Russian misinformation complain and represent Russian interests here in Canada" as well as asking "to cease all the footage that was captured".

The Ukrainian Ministry of Culture and Strategic Communications included director Trofimova in its list of people posing a threat to the national security of Ukraine (Order No. 652 from September 17, 2024). Trofimova’s name, her email and other contact information including her address were also added to the Myrotvorets "hit list of Ukrainian enemies".

=== TVO withdrawal ===
Following protests from the Ukrainian community, one of the film's funders, TVO, withdrew support from the film, adding that "TVO will be reviewing the process by which this project was funded and our brand leveraged." In response, the Documentary Organization of Canada issued a statement in which it is "profoundly alarmed by TVOntario’s Board of Directors’ recent unilateral decision to withdraw support for the documentary "Russians at War", adding that it "raises serious concerns about political interference, and must be confronted in order to preserve the integrity of our media institutions."

Several media outlets considered this decision as made under political pressure from Chrystia Freeland since "ironically, TVO’s decision to pull the film came mere hours after an industry panel at TIFF where filmmakers praised TVO for its support for filmmakers eager to take risks and engage audiences with challenging and topical films.". The TVO board’s decision to pull the film from the schedule backtracks on a statement made by the TVO Education Group just four days earlier on September 6, 2024: "Russians at War is at its core an anti-war film. This film shows the increasing disillusionment of Russian soldiers as their experience at the front doesn’t jibe with the media lies their families are being told at home. The film was produced by an Academy Award nominee with the support of cultural agencies in France and Canada because it is a documentary made in the tradition of independent war correspondence. We encourage people to see the documentary for themselves when it is available."

Media outlets, such as The Globe and Mail, National Post, The Washington Post, Toronto Star and Point of View immediately reacted to the statement of the Deputy PM and the TVO decision, seeing it as censorship.

Citing Deputy Prime Minister Freeland's concerns about Canadian public funds used to finance the film, the National Post responded: "No, what’s inappropriate is recipients of public money cancelling projects under pressure from politicians and special-interest groups. The most important point is that government and government-funded entities — Ontario’s public broadcaster, the Ukrainian Canadian Congress (UCC), TIFF, Deputy Prime Minister Chrystia Freeland and other MPs — successfully conspired to keep people from seeing the film and judging for themselves.".

Point of View magazine wrote: "Deputy Prime Minister Chrystia Freeland, who also hadn’t seen the film, bought into the misinformation campaign of the uninformed protesters and denounced both the doc and the festival for allegedly white-washing Russia’s crimes (which it doesn’t). As she legitimatized the mob and gave the controversy traction, Freeland essentially threw public funding for political art under the bus—an affront to this lefty film critic who believes that everyone should watch a film before reviewing it, although I can appreciate the pain that Ukrainian-Canadians may feel over the film’s premise."

Jane Jankovic, the former executive producer of documentaries at TVO following her retirement, also issued a statement on the TVO board decision. "I commissioned this film for TVO when I was executive producer of documentaries. I was surprised the board of directors at TVO decided it will not broadcast the film," she said. "This action is worrisome for the documentary industry. What has happened to Russians at War is a form of censorship. It creates a chill among documentary funders that will prevent important and controversial stories from being told. That is not our tradition in Canada. Documentaries are meant to create conversations, not shut them down."

The editors of Canadian magazine Point of View stated: "TVO’s decision to withdraw support comes at a moment of seismic change for the documentary community. Talking points at festivals and industry panels have noted distributors’ and broadcasters’ risk aversion and growing reluctance to support overtly political documentaries as music docs and celebrity biographies inundate streamers and broadcast windows. The result could have serious implications for filmmakers eager to depict challenging and provocative stories."

Marsha Lederman from The Globe and Mail noted that censoring art is never a good idea: "Keeping this film under wraps is denying the public of more than the experience of seeing an excellent movie. It is restricting access to a vital message: an unforgiving indictment of war", "it is a cowardly move to work to suppress his courageous film. And it is a mistake… Propaganda? Please. Triumph of the Will this is not. This is eye-opening and gutting. The only "propaganda" this documentary serves up is an anti-war message that should be delivered as far and wide as possible."

Andrew Phillips from Toronto Star called the "TVO’s position in this mess is particularly egregious" translating the TVO’s board of directors September 10, 2024 statement as "We got pressured and we caved". Phillips’ opinion was that "for politicians and organizations like TVO to go along in this case with what amounts to a demand for censorship is shameful."

When Chris Selley from the National Post argued that this film shouldn’t be cancelled under pressure from politicians and special-interest groups, he was accused of enabling fascism by a member of the King’s Privy Council, former Conservative immigration minister Chris Alexander, who admitted to not seeing the film. Selly also pointed out that another politician, Canadian Liberal MP Yvan Baker celebrated on social media by saying: "We did it!" after TIFF paused the film’s North American premiere. Instead of restraining protestors from reported threats of violence, Baker wrote to them: "Thank you to all who worked to make this happen." Selly commented on this: "Censorship is bad. If you need a citation, I would suggest the Charter of Rights and Freedoms. But the principle predates that document by centuries".

The production team submitted an official legal request to the TVO demanding this network to reinstate the support for the film. As The Globe and Mail reports, in a letter dated September 19, 2024 and addressed to TVO board and management, lawyer Danny Webber wrote that the network’s decision to pull support for the film "represents a clear violation of the filmmaker’s rights, not only under the broadcast agreement but also in terms of the broader principles of fairness, editorial independence, and respect for artistic integrity."
