= Yevheniia Kravchuk =

Ukrainian politician

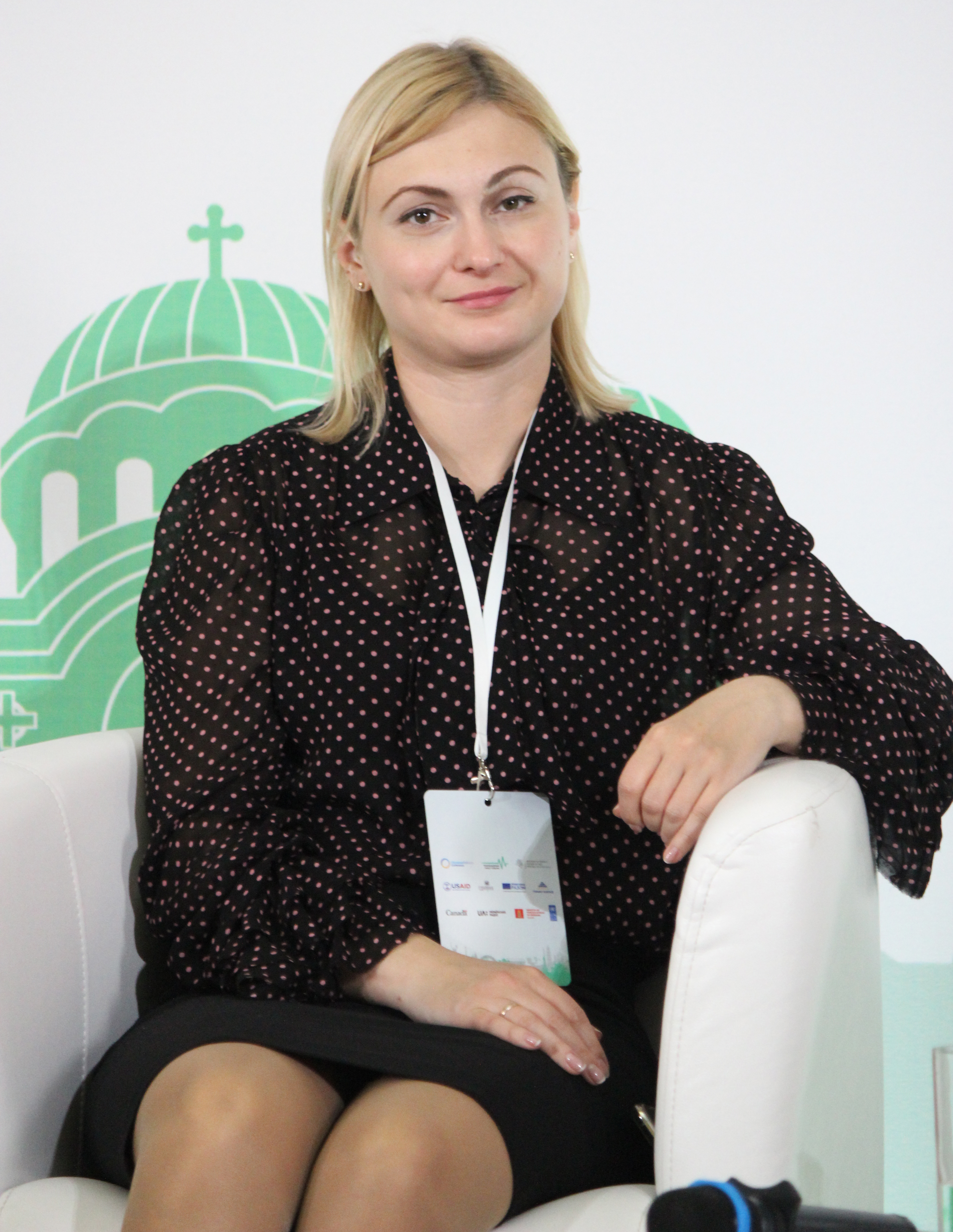
- Kravchuk in 2020
- Born: December 23, 1985 (age 40); Ternopil
- Education: Taras Shevchenko National University of Kyiv
- Occupation: politician
- Known for: deputy of the Verkhovna Rada
- Political party: Servant of the People

Yevheniia Mykhailivna Kravchuk aka Yevgeniya Kravchuk and Evgenia Kravchuk (born December 23, 1985) is a Ukrainian politician. She is a deputy of the Verkhovna Rada (Ukrainian parliament).

== Life ==
Kravchuk was born to a family involved in medicine in Ternopil in 1985. She is a graduate in journalism from the Taras Shevchenko National University of Kyiv.

She is a member of the ruling Servant of the People political party and she was an elected deputy of the Verkhovna Rada (Ukrainian parliament) in 2019. She became the Deputy Chairman of the Verkhovna Rada Committee on Humanitarian and Information Policy.

She is a member of the Parliamentary Assembly of the Council of Europe’s (PACE) Culture Committee where she has argued that Russia's erasure of Ukrainian identity constitutes a "genocide policy". At a PACE meeting in June 2024 the committee supported a report made by Kravchuk which condemned as a war-crime the "Russification of children, the rewriting of history textbooks... and destroying cultural heritage".

In 2024 she was appointed to the supervisory board of the Ukrainian Institute.

In 2024 Anastasia Trofimova's film Russians at War was released. It looks at the Ukrainian war from a Russian perspective and it is accused on ignoring war crimes. Kravchuk said the film is a "striking example of how Russia, thanks to its soft power, is trying to promote its narratives about a ‘more comprehensive understanding of the war’. And unfortunately, they are doing this quite successfully."

Ukraine decided to join the International Criminal Court in 2024 to expedite charges against Russian invaders of Ukraine. Kravchuk was quoted for noting that a clause in the agreement would controversially protect Ukrainians from similar charges for seven years, due to Article 124 of the Rome Statute.
