= Willie (film) =

2019 Canadian documentary film

- Directed by: Laurence Mathieu-Léger
- Produced by: Laurence Mathieu-Léger; Bryant McBride
- Starring: Willie O'Ree; Gary Bettman; Wayne Gretzky
- Cinematography: Laurence Mathieu-Léger
- Edited by: Rosella Tursi
- Music by: Justin Melland
- Production company: Don Kee Productions
- Release date: April 29, 2019 (Hot Docs)
- Running time: 89 minutes
- Country: Canada
- Language: English

Willie is a Canadian documentary film, directed by Laurence Mathieu-Léger and released in 2019. The film is a portrait of Willie O'Ree, the first Black hockey player ever to play in the National Hockey League, amid the context of the campaign to get him inducted into the Hockey Hall of Fame, which was still in progress at the time of filming before resulting in his induction in fall 2018.

== Distribution ==
The film premiered at the 2019 Hot Docs Canadian International Documentary Festival, and was later screened at the Windsor International Film Festival in competition for the WIFF Prize in Canadian Film.

It was subsequently acquired by ESPN, which broadcast it in the United States on February 17, 2020, as well as streaming it as a Black History Month special on its online platforms.

== Critical response ==
For Point of View, Jason Anderson wrote that "Thanks to its bounty of insights about race as well as hockey, and the suspense generated by the question of whether O’Ree will get the call from the Hall (no spoilers here, though news coverage last November may have tipped you off), Willie becomes both a celebration of a life well-lived and a timely reminder of the continuing challenges for athletes of colour."

Jared Mobarak of The Film Stage wrote that "That he remains humble with a smile only endears him further to hopefully be placed on equal footing as Jackie Robinson rather than relegated one step below as “the Jackie Robinson of hockey.” Mathieu-Leger's film is straightforward enough to provide the details as to why he’s always been the latter, but personal enough to warrant the former. Rather than get lost in someone else's shadow, O’Ree should be known as the one casting it for countless hockey players and fans alike. Willie proves a feel-good story as a result with a healthy dose of historical documentation to collect his legacy in a single place."
