= Forest City Film Festival =

Film festival in London, Ontario, Canada

- Location: London, Ontario, Canada
- Founded: 2016; 10 years ago
- Most recent: 2025 Forest City Film Festival
- Website: https://fcff.ca/

The Forest City Film Festival (often abbreviated as FCFF) is a film festival located in London, Ontario, Canada. Founded in 2016, the Forest City Film Festival centres on exhibiting the work of filmmakers from Southwestern Ontario in juried competition for features, shorts, documentaries, short animations and other categories, although it also screens a selection of other Canadian and International films out of competition.

The event is typically held in October each year, principally at the London Public Library's Wolf Performance Hall.

== History ==
=== 2016 ===
The Forest City Film Festival was founded in 2016 by Dorothy Downs. The first festival was a collection of twenty-five films, screened over three days in November to an audience of 1200.

=== 2017 ===
In 2017, the festival added an animation category and an out-of-competition International Screening, totaling 48 films. The festival’s duration was expanded from three days to five in October, with 1800 audience members in attendance.

=== 2018 ===
In 2018, FCFF added a special Flashback Friday screening, a celebration of older films with a connection to the region. The Breakfast Club was screened, followed by a Q&A with special guest and London-native John Kapelos, who played Carl, the janitor in the film. The festival also held their first pitch competition for short films. FCFF 2018 offered 48 films once again, met by a 33% increase in attendees, totaling 2400 audience members in attendance that year.

=== 2019 ===
In 2019, the Forest City Youth Film Festival was introduced, offering a separate competition for high school student filmmakers in Southwestern Ontario. This year, the number of films increased to 64 films which were screened over a five day period. Attendance increased from 2400 to 3200.

=== 2020 ===
In 2020, the COVID-19 pandemic forced the Forest City Film Festival to offer their festival digitally. For an eight day period, 75 films were available for online on-demand viewing from anywhere in Canada, resulting in 4000 audience members in attendance. Additionally, a new Music Video category was added to the competition.

=== 2021 ===
In 2021, the film festival took on a hybrid model, returning to in-person screenings in downtown London while also continuing to offer nationwide online viewing. FCFF 2021 offered 92 films, viewed by 6100 in-person attendees and 4500 virtual views. 2021 also saw the festival’s Industry Sessions take on the name Ontario Screen Creators Conference, alongside expanding their offerings to a full weekend of events dedicated to education and networking for film industry professionals. Additionally, the pitch competition was rebranded to Project Pitch, a national competition to pitch a feature film for the opportunity to win a prize package with a value $60,000 in products, services, and cash grants. The Forest City Youth Film Festival also grew dramatically, screening 29 short films across seven categories.

=== 2022 ===
The 2022 edition ran from October 15 to 23, screening 70 films in competition. The festival included Indigenous films in two programs, as well as a new category, Best of the World Fests showcasing 14 films from around the world that had premiered and won awards at international festivals such as Cannes, Sundance, Berlinale, and TIFF.

=== 2023 ===
The 2023 Forest City Film Festival marked the organisation's eighth year and represented a significant rebound following the COVID-19 pandemic. Held over nine days, the festival presented 74 films across 38 in-person programs at venues throughout downtown London. The festival opened with its first TD-sponsored Opening Night event, featuring the documentary Mr Dressup: The Magic of Make-Believe, directed by London filmmaker Robert McCallum and written by Jordan Christopher Morris. The screening was followed by a discussion with members of the film's creative team, Jordan Morris, Ernie Coombs’ manager Don Jones, and cast member Jim Parker, celebrating the legacy of Canadian children's television icon Ernie Coombs.

The festival showcased 17 world premieres, including four feature films, as well as four Canadian premieres. Other notable programming included 15 films in the Best of the World Fests series, four French-language programs, two Indigenous film programs curated by Oneida filmmaker Judith Schuyler, and an expanded Youth Day featuring student films and industry events. The Experimental Night at Museum London attracted an exceptional turnout and introduced the inaugural Old Oak Experimental Film Fan Favourite Award and the Old Oak Best of the World Fests Fan Favourite Award.

The accompanying Ontario Screen Creators Conference (OSCC) hosted 15 industry events and welcomed 38 film and television professionals from organisations including Telefilm Canada, CBC, Ontario Creates, the Canada Media Fund, and the Writers Guild of Canada. The conference also featured what was described as Canada's largest film pitch competition, Project Pitch, awarding $120,000 in funding across short film, feature film, and web series categories.

Audience engagement increased substantially from the previous year, with total festival attendance reaching 6,774 people, a 30 per cent increase from 2022. The festival generated an estimated $194,700 in spending at local businesses and continued to attract visitors from outside the region. Executive Director Dorothy Downs described 2023 as a milestone year that marked the festival's full return to pre-pandemic levels of audience participation and community engagement.

=== 2024 ===
The 2024 Forest City Film Festival took place over nine days and featured 94 films presented through 51 programs across four venues in downtown London. The festival introduced the TD Celebration of Film and Music as its opening event, combining music videos, live performances, and film to celebrate London's designation as Canada's only UNESCO City of Music. The festival also launched its inaugural Lifetime Achievement in Entertainment Award, honouring Canadian actor Victor Garber. The celebration included screenings of several of Garber's films and virtual appearances from industry colleagues, including Martin Short, Andrea Martin, Nathan Lane, Jennifer Garner, J.J. Abrams, Eugene Levy, Rob Marshall, and Paul Shaffer.

The festival featured 10 world premieres, four Indigenous films, and an expanded Ontario Screen Creators Conference (OSCC), which welcomed more than 40 industry professionals from organisations including Telefilm Canada, CBC, the Canada Media Fund, and Ontario Creates. The Project Pitch awarded over $73,000 in funding and prizes to emerging filmmakers. Festival attendance reached 8,137 people, representing a 22 percent increase over 2023, while total audience engagement exceeded 22,000 participants through festival and year-round programming.

=== 2025 ===
The 2025 Forest City Film Festival marked the organisation's 10th anniversary and expanded to ten days of programming. The festival presented 112 films, including 20 world premieres across four venues. A total of 129 filmmakers participated in screenings, Q&A sessions, and networking events throughout the festival.

The TD Celebration of Film and Music returned as the opening-night event, featuring 16 diverse music videos and heartfelt performances by three Southwestern Ontario musicians: Amanda Keeles, Ron Leary and Burn Unders, and the announcement of a cultural exchange initiative with Croatia, supported by the London Music Office. The Best of the World Fests program recorded its strongest attendance to date, with 17 critically acclaimed, international and Canadian films gracing the screens, including sold-out screenings for Sentimental Value, No Other Choice, and Nirvanna The Band The Show The Movie.

The festival's second Lifetime Achievement in Entertainment Award was presented to London-born, television writer and producer David Shore, creator of House M.D. and The Good Doctor. The celebration included appearances by actors Hugh Laurie, who flew in to surprise David Shore on stage, and Freddie Highmore, who virtually participated in screenings and audience discussions related to Shore's work. The Forest City Youth Festival, held on Tuesday, showcased 24 student films and attracted a lively audience, culminating in the high-energy and inspiring Awards Show and Red Carpet Soiree. Experimental Night at Museum London hosted a packed house with 8 artistic films screened and a full 9-person Q&A.

The Ontario Screen Creators Conference (OSCC) continued to expand, held at RBC Place downtown London, welcoming more than 50 industry experts and awarding over $83,000 through pitch competitions for short, documentary, and feature film projects. Festival attendance reached 10,118 people, a 25 per cent increase over 2024, while total audience engagement exceeded 26,000 participants. The festival also generated more than $1 million in visitor and event spending.

=== Upcoming Festival ===
The 11th annual Forest City Film Festival is scheduled to take place from October 15–25, 2026. The festival will expand to 11 days of programming and continue its focus on showcasing Southwestern Ontario filmmakers while presenting Canadian and international cinema to audiences in London, Ontario.

== Film Categories ==
The Forest City Film Festival offers the following categories of competition for submitted films:

- Narrative Feature, a feature-length film that tells a fictional or fictionalized story, event or narrative.
- Short Narrative, a film under 25 minutes that tells a fictional or fictionalized story, event or narrative.
- Feature Documentary, a feature-length non-fictional film.
- Short Documentary, a non-fictional film under 40 minutes.
- Short Animation, an animated film under 25 minutes.
- Music Video, a film of any length integrating a song or musical album.
- Screenplay, a screenplay between 75 and 120 pages.

In 2021, an Experimental category was also available.

== Southwestern Ontario Connection ==
In order to be eligible for the Forest City Film Festival competition, there must be a substantial connection to Southwestern Ontario. This connection may be:

- At least one member of the key artistic team must be from or resided in Southwestern Ontario for a portion of their life.
- The film is about a person, location, or event in Southwestern Ontario.
- The film was produced, in part or in full, in Southwestern Ontario.

== Awards ==
The Forest City Film Festival designates one film from each competition category as the best of the year. The film is selected by a viewing committee made up of filmmakers and community members. Each award winner receives a trophy and a cash prize. The exception to this is the Old Oak Audience Choice Award. This award is not selected by a committee, instead selected by audience rankings.

=== 2016 ===
Award	Title	Director	Ref
Best Narrative Feature	Liminality	Darryl Callcott	
Best Short Narrative	My Brother Charlie	Evan Hamza	
Best Feature Documentary	Missing Mom	Robert McCallum, Jordan Christopher Morris	
Best Short Documentary	Revealing Marie Saint Pierre	Janice Zolf	
Old Oak Audience Choice Award	Revealing Marie Saint Pierre	Janice Zolf	

=== 2017 ===
Award	Title	Director	Ref
Best Narrative Feature	Go Fish	Brett Heard, Kate Drummond	
Best Short Narrative	Martin's Hagge	Penny Eizenga	
Best Feature Documentary	Sea of Life	Julia Barnes	
Best Short Documentary	Babe, I Hate to Go	Andrew Moir	
Best Animation	It Happened During Recess	Cherry Zong, Jani Balakumar, Devin Emery, Olivia Zhao, Patt Jewanarom, Jade Armstrong, Michelle Oh, Yi Peng, Yiwei Zhou, Cong Nie, Andy Zhou, Angela Liao	
Best Screenplay	Lost Slaves of Sand Island	Lisa Hagan	
Old Oak Audience Choice Award	Clearing the Way	Paul Culliton	

=== 2018 ===
Award	Title	Director	Ref
Best Narrative Feature	Firecrackers	Jasmin Mozaffari	
Best Short Narrative	Little Black Dress	Mackenzie Donaldson	
Best Feature Documentary	What Walaa Wants	Christy Garland	
Best Short Documentary	Nests of Gold	Alan Poon	
Best Animation	Gamble	Chayadol Lomtong	
Best Screenplay	The Infected		
Old Oak Audience Choice Award	The Drawer Boy	Arturo Pérez Torres, Aviva Armour-Ostroff	

=== 2019 ===
Award	Title	Director	Ref
Best Narrative Feature	Open for Submissions	Bryan Skinner, Ana de Lara	
Best Short Narrative	Christmas Green	Allan Magee, Melanie McCaig, Ali Mashayekhi, Neil Huber, Clara Altimas	
Best Feature Documentary	Prey	Matt Gallagher	
Best Short Documentary	Take Me to Prom	Andrew Moir	
Best Animation	"Little Star"	iskwē	
Best Screenplay	My Canadian Son	Theodore Bezair	
Old Oak Audience Choice Award	Prey	Matt Gallagher	

=== 2020 ===
Award	Title	Director	Ref
Best Narrative Feature	The Cuban	Sergio Navarretta	
Best Short Narrative	Break Up for the Modern Girl	Sydney Herauf	
Best Feature Documentary	The Walrus and the Whistleblower	Nathalie Bibeau	
Best Short Documentary	Hollie's Dress	Annie Sakkab	
Best Animation	Scribblings	Tori Richards	
Best Screenplay	Sluts	Mary Cross	
Best Music Video	"Gerry" — WHOOP-Szo	Travis Welowsky	
Old Oak Audience Choice Award	Into the Light	Janice Zolf	
Pitch Competition	My Regularly Scheduled Chemo Appointment	Tyson Breuer	

=== 2021 ===
Award	Title	Director	Ref
Best Narrative Feature	Marlene	Wendy Hill-Tout	
Best Short Narrative	Paris, Ontario	Arnaud Weissenburger	
Best Feature Documentary	Dead Man's Switch: A Crypto Mystery	Sheona McDonald	
Best Short Documentary	Stitched Glass	Ian Daffern, Omar Majeed	
Best Animation	The Lost Seahorse	Benjamin Fieschi-Rose	
Best Screenplay	Both Sides Now	Tyler Dowey	
Best Music Video	"Eso Que Tu Haces" — Lido Pimienta	Lido Pimienta	
Old Oak Audience Choice Award	The Gig Is Up	Shannon Walsh	
Project Pitch	Audit	Geordie Sabbagh	

=== 2022 ===
Award	Title	Director	Ref
Best Narrative Feature	Ashgrove	Jeremy LaLonde	
Best Short Narrative	Tenth Generation	Matthew Downs	
Best Feature Documentary	The Long Rider	Sean Cisterna	
Best Short Documentary	Cod Story	Noa Roginski	
Best Animation	The Star Mill	Daniel Blake	
Best Screenplay	Chameleon	Pat Brown	
Best Music Video	"Hurt So Bad" — Bella Rosa	Paula Vergara	
Old Oak Audience Choice Award	Burden	Ethan Hickey	
Pitch Competition	Cry Wolf	Faran Moradi	

=== 2023 ===
Award	Title	Director	Ref
Best Narrative Feature	The Boy in the Woods	Rebecca Snow	
Best Short Narrative	Adore	Beth Warrian	
Best Feature Documentary	July Talk: Love Lives Here	Brittany Farhat	
Best Short Documentary	Uproot	Queena Liu	
Best Animation	Afterimage	All Ears Productions	
Best Screenplay	Legs	Jen Romnes	
Audience Choice Award, Narrative	The Boy in the Woods	Rebecca Snow	
Old Oak Audience Choice Award, Documentary	Mr. Dressup: The Magic of Make-Believe	Robert McCallum	
Old Oak Audience Choice Award, Experimental	Zoon-Manitou	Trevor Blumas	
Pitch Competition, Narrative	Turn It Up	Jesse Thomas Cook	
Pitch Competition, Short	Lake’niha’ (My Father)	Judith Schuyler	
Pitch Competition, Web Series	18 to 35	Rahul Chaturvedi	

=== 2024 ===
Award	Title	Director	Ref
Best Narrative Feature	All the Lost Ones	Mackenzie Donaldson	
Best Short Narrative	Desync	Minerva Marie Navasca	
Best Feature Documentary	Curl Power	Josephine Anderson	
Best Short Documentary	Bad at This	Jessie Posthumus	
Best Animation	Detours Ahead	Esther Cheung	
Best Performance	Matt and Mara	Deragh Campbell	
Best Music Video	OMBIIGIZI, "Connecting"	OMBIIGIZI	
Music Video Technical Merit	Donovan Woods, "How Good"	Brittany Farhat	
Best Technical Narrative Feature	A Thousand Cuts	Jake Horowitz	
Best Technical Documentary Feature	999: The Forgotten Girls	Heather Dune Macadam, Beatriz Calleja	
Impact Award	Atrocity	Nigel Stuckey	
Old Oak Fan Favourite Award	The Count of Monte Cristo	Matthieu Delaporte, Alexandre de La Patellière	
Screenwriting Competition	Slowly Fleeting	Darryl Callcott	
Pitch Competition, Feature Film	Broken Bones	Rebeka Herron	
Pitch Competition, Short Film	Writ Or	Natalie Davey, Rebecca Davey	

=== 2025 ===
Award	Title	Director	Ref
Best Narrative Feature	Racewalkers	Kevin Claydon, Phil Moniz	
Best Short Narrative	The Understudy	Peter Pasyk	
Best Feature Documentary	The Art of Adventure	Alison Reid	
Best Short Documentary	Jason MacLean: Boomerang Smile	Jane Brill	
Best Screenplay	Whitechapel Revisited	Ryan M. Andrews	
Best Performance	Gentle Barbarians	Amir Bageria	
Best Music Video	Aysanabee, "Gone Baby Gone"	Brittany Farhat	
Technical Merit	Nika and Madison	Eva Thomas	
Technical Merit	What We Carry	Jessie Anthony	
Impact Award	Interpreting Erik	Donald D'Haene	
Old Oak Fan Favourite Award, Feature Film	Nika and Madison	Eva Thomas	
Old Oak Fan Favourite Award, Short Film	Wrestling with Life	Alexa Bogdanis	
Pitch Competition, Feature Film	Hi, My Name's Mike!	Danny Dunlop	
Pitch Competition, Documentary	100 Days to Showtime	Kristina Esposito	
Pitch Competition, Short Films	Petrichor	Erin Brandenburg	

== Special Screenings and Events ==
Each year since 2017, the Forest City Film Festival has offered special screenings and events within the duration of the festival.

=== Lerners Opening Night ===
Lerners Opening Night is the official launch of the festival, though it is not always the first day of screenings. The film is typically out of competition. Traditionally, the screening is preceded by a gala event at a local restaurant.

Previous Lerners Opening Night films include:

- Trigger Point (screened at FCFF 2021)

=== Flashback Friday ===
Flashback Friday, traditionally held on a Friday evening during the festival, presents a screening of an older film with a connection to the region of Southwestern Ontario. A member of the cast or crew typically attends for a post-screen question and answer session.

Previous Flashback Friday films include:

- The Breakfast Club (screened at FCFF 2018)

=== Music Video Night ===
Music Video Night is an event screening all of the selected films in the Music Video category. Additional to the screening, there are live performances by featured musical artists.

=== Indigenous Film Programs ===
The Forest City Film Festival works with Indigenous filmmakers within the region to curate programs of Indigenous films.

Previous Indigenous films screened include:

- Beans (screened at FCFF 2021)

These curated films are not a part of the film festival competition, though films by Indigenous filmmakers that are submitted and selected are in contention.

=== School-friendly Screenings ===
Each year, the Forest City Film Festival invites classes from across Southwestern Ontario to attend weekday matinee screenings. A Teacher's Guide is developed and distributed to ensure the screened films are age-appropriate.

=== Forest City Youth Film Festival ===
The Forest City Youth Film Festival (often abbreviated as FCYFF) is a separate filmmaking competition under the umbrella of the Forest City Film Festival. Entrants to the FCYFF must be high school students in Southwestern Ontario. The competition is judged by a jury of industry professionals. Selected films are screened at a special event during the Forest City Film Festival.

Historically, the categories of competition are:

- Animation
- Narrative
- Documentary
- Pitch
- Experimental
- Music Video
- Promotional Video

Live online seminars are offered year-round to member school boards. These seminars give high schoolers and aspiring filmmakers the opportunity to learn more about the various aspects of filmmaking from industry experts, student filmmakers, and post-secondary educators, with an additional focus on career opportunities.

=== Ontario Screen Creators Conference ===
Previously known as FCFF Industry Sessions, the Ontario Screen Creators Conference (often abbreviated as OSCC) is a three-day conference that takes place on one weekend of the Forest City Film Festival. The conference invites filmmakers and industry professionals of all experience levels to learn and connect at seminars, panels, networking parties, and other events held both in London, Ontario and online. Previous sessions have included:

- Behind the Scenes with Colm Feore, a longform interview with Canadian stage and screen actor Colm Feore.
- Documentary Design, a panel of documentarians discussing the process of defining visual design in documentary films.
- Authentic Voices Through a Diverse Lens, a panel of LGBTQIA+ and BIPOC filmmakers discussing representation in film.
- Forest City Feature Film Pitch, an annual pitch competition for emerging filmmakers to present unproduced screenplays; the winner of the competition receives $60,000 in grants and in-kind services from various organizations and companies. The festival previously offered a smaller-scale pitch competition for local emerging filmmakers working on their first short films; it was expanded to feature films in 2021, and was open to filmmakers from anywhere in Canada as long as they agreed to shoot and produce at least 50 per cent of their film in and around London. The winner of the first feature pitch competition was Geordie Sabbagh for his film Audit; the 2022 competition was won by Faran Moradi for Cry Wolf.
