= Dispatches from a Field Hospital =

Canadian documentary film

- Genre: Documentary
- Written by: Matt Gallagher; Nick Hector
- Directed by: Matt Gallagher
- Music by: Ohad Benchetrit; Justin Small
- Country of origin: Canada
- Original language: English

Production
- Producers: Matt Gallagher; Cornelia Principe
- Cinematography: Matt Gallagher
- Editor: Robert Swartz
- Running time: 82 minutes
- Production company: Border City Pictures

Original release
- Network: TVOntario
- Release: March 16, 2021

Dispatches from a Field Hospital is a Canadian documentary television film, directed by Matt Gallagher and released in 2021. The film centres on the launch of a field hospital on the grounds of St. Clair College in Windsor during the early days of the COVID-19 pandemic in Canada, and the extraordinary steps that people would undertake to remain in contact with their loved ones in the facility despite lockdown restrictions.

The film premiered March 16, 2021 on TVOntario. It also later received an outdoor theatrical screening at Windsor's Riverfront Festival Plaza in August, as part of the Windsor International Film Festival's Under the Stars screening series.

The film was a Canadian Screen Award nominee for the Donald Brittain Award for best social or political documentary at the 10th Canadian Screen Awards in 2022.
