= Shannon Walsh =

Canadian filmmaker

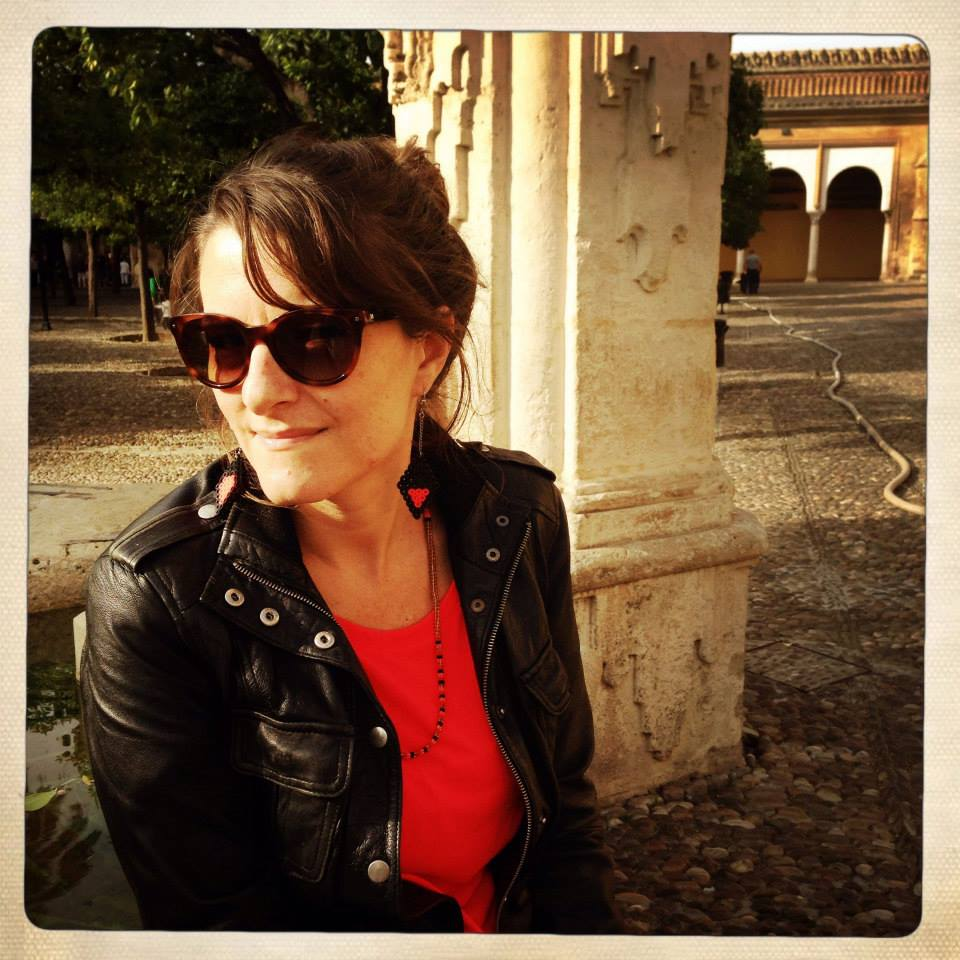
- Born: London, Ontario, Canada
- Education: McGill University (PhD); Concordia University (MA, BFA)
- Occupations: Film director, Associate Professor
- Years active: 2008–present
- Awards: Guggenheim Fellowship; Governor General's Award in Visual and Media Arts; Elected, Royal Society of Canada College of New Scholars, Artists and Scientists

Shannon Walsh is a Canadian filmmaker, writer and scholar. She has directed multiple feature documentaries, including Adrianne & the Castle, The Gig Is Up, À St-Henri, le 26 août, and Illusions of Control featuring theorist Lauren Berlant. She has also directed short fiction and music videos for the Montreal-based artist Little Scream.

Walsh, who was born in London, Ontario, is also an academic, and teaches film production at the University of British Columbia in the Department of Theatre and Film. She is the author of The Documentary Filmmaker's Intuition: Creating Ethical and Impactful Non-fiction Films. She is also the co-editor of the books Ties that Bind: Race and the Politics of Friendship in South Africa, and In My Life: Stories from activists in South Africa 2002-2022.

She was awarded a Guggenheim Fellowship in 2020 and awarded a Governor General's Award in Visual and Media Arts in 2023. In 2025, Walsh was elected to the College of New Scholars, Artists and Scientists of the Royal Society of Canada.

Walsh has also worked extensively in community-based and participatory media, often in South Africa, particularly with women and young people. Her research and practice have focused on participatory filmmaking, gender, social justice and activist research, using methods including participatory video, photovoice and creative writing. She is a co-director of TRANSFORM, an international research partnership focused on youth-led approaches to social change and gender transformation.

== Filmography ==
=== Feature Films ===
- 2009: H2Oil (feature documentary)
- 2011: A St-Henri le 26 Aout (feature documentary)
- 2013: Jeppe on a Friday (feature documentary) made with Arya Lalloo
- 2019: Illusions of Control (feature documentary)
- 2021: The Gig Is Up (feature documentary)
- 2024: Adrianne & the Castle (feature documentary)

=== Selected Short Films ===
- 2002: Revisit (experimental fiction) directed with Rawi Hage
- 2003: Sayeh (medium-length documentary) directed with Kaveh Nabatian and Nicolas Rutigliano
- 2003: Fire & Hope (documentary)
- 2006: Inkani (documentary) with Heinrich Bohmke
- 2014: Under the Umbrella (documentary)
- 2018: Disappearance: Hong Kong Stories (360 VR documentary)
- 2019: Matsutake Hunters (documentary)
- 2022: This Phantom Pain, Letter #1 (experimental short)

== Bibliography ==
=== Books ===
- The Documentary Filmmaker's Intuition: Creating Ethical and Impactful Non-fiction Films (Routledge, 2024)

=== Edited Books ===
- Ties That Bind: Race and the Politics of Friendship in South Africa with Jon Soske (Wits University Press/New York University Press, 2016)
- In My Life: Stories from Young Activists in South Africa 2002-2022 with Claudia Mitchell and Mandla Oliphant (Jacana Media, 2022)

== Awards and Honours ==
- 2020 — Guggenheim Fellowship
- 2023 — Governor General's Award in Visual and Media Arts
- 2025 — MacDowell Fellowship
- 2025 — Elected to the College of New Scholars, Artists and Scientists, Royal Society of Canada
- 2026 — Selected for the Toronto International Film Festival Writers' Lab
- 2026 — CHANEL Women Creators' Network Grant

=== Selected Film Awards ===
Walsh's work has been recognized at major documentary festivals and industry bodies. Illusions of Control (2019) was nominated for Best Canadian Documentary at Hot Docs and won an Honourable Mention for the same category at Calgary International. The Gig Is Up (2021) premiered at IDFA, where it was selected as Best of the Fests, and received nominations for the F:ACT Award at CPH:DOX and for Best Canadian Documentary at Hot Docs, along with a Canadian Screen Award nomination for editing; it won the Audience Choice Award at Forest City.

Adrianne & the Castle premiered at SXSW in 2024, with its Canadian premiere at Hot Docs and a screening as the opening film of DOXA, prior to playing at the 28th Fantasia International Film Festival. It went on to an Academy Award-qualifying limited theatrical run, and was nominated for Best Canadian Documentary at both Hot Docs and Calgary International, the Colin Low Award for Best Director at DOXA, the Golden Athena for Best Documentary at Athens International Film Festival, and the Allan King Award for Excellence in Documentary from the Directors Guild of Canada. It received a Leo Award nomination for Best Screenwriting in a Feature Length Documentary and a Canadian Screen Award nomination for Best Original Music (composer Richard Reed Parry) in 2025. Her earlier feature H2Oil (2009) won an Honorable Mention EcoCamera Award at RIDM and the Grand Prize at the Festival de films pour l'environnement in 2010.
