= Avner Shahaf =

Israeli cinematographer (born 1987)

- אבנר שחף
- Born: September 25, 1972; Tel Aviv, Israel
- Citizenship: Israel
- Occupation: Cinematographer

Avner Shahaf (Hebrew: אבנר שחף; born September 25, 1972) is an Israeli cinematographer and a member of the Academy of Motion Picture Arts and Sciences (AMPAS).

== Biography ==
Shahaf was born in Tel Aviv and grew up in Ramat Hasharon, the middle child among three siblings. He studied at the Maine Media Art School in the United States.

In 2011, he filmed the video art "Hilarious" for the artist Roee Rosen and the short film "Out," which won at the Venice Film Festival, also directed by Roee Rosen.

In 2012, he filmed the movie The Gatekeepers directed by Dror Moreh. The film won numerous awards and was nominated for an American Academy Award in the documentary category.

In 2015, he filmed the movie Censored Voices directed by Mor Loushy. The film won the Israeli Academy Award and was later nominated for the Jury Prize at the Sundance Festival.

In 2016, he filmed the movie Zero Days directed by Alex Gibney, the short documentary "Don’t Call Me Cute" directed by Julie Shles, and the movie "Sacred," which was selected for screening at "Doc NYC" and "IDFA 2016".

In 2017, he filmed the movie Muhi: Generally Temporary and the movie "Salah: This is the Land of Israel" (סאלח, פה זה ישראל) which won the directing and research award at the Docaviv Festival.

In 2018, he filmed the movie "The Oslo Diaries," which was nominated for an Emmy Award, the movie "Avenging Evil," the movie "Army of Lovers in the Holy Land," and the movie "Personal Questions."

In 2019, he filmed the short series "Transkids," the movie "To Catch Joshua," and the series "The Devil Next Door" directed by Yossi Bloch and Daniel Sivan, which was broadcast on Netflix.

In 2020, he filmed the movie "Olmert: The Man Who Wanted Too Much," the movie "Kings of Capitol Hill," and the movie "Murder in the North Cinema."

In 2021, he filmed the short series "Enemies" (אויבים), and the movies: "Blue Box" "Dirty Tricks," "Nelson’s Last War," "The Reason Why," "The Last Chapter of A.B. Yehoshua," and "Schoolyard#" which received an honorable mention at the Jerusalem Film Festival.

In 2023, he participated in the documentary project "Without a State, There Are Citizens" broadcast on Kan 11, and filmed three short films for it: "End of the Party," "Naama’s Command Center," and "Open Spaces".

In 2024, he filmed the movie “The Bibi Files”. The filmed gained significant attention due to Prime minister Benjamin Netanyahu’s attempts to stop its release. The film was included in the Academy Awards shortlist in 2025.
