= Danae Elon =

Israeli filmmaker

- דנאי אילון
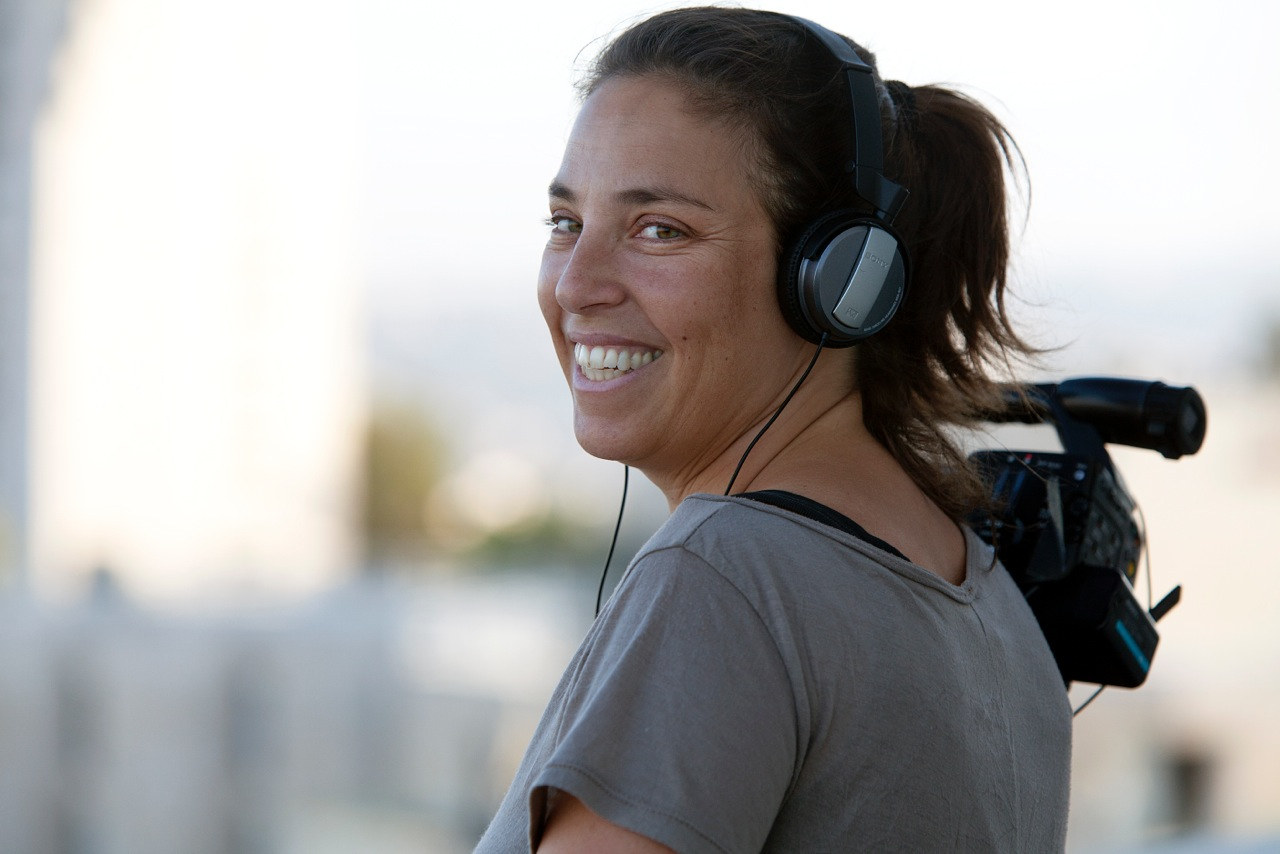
- Born: Danae Elon; December 23, 1970 (age 55); Jerusalem, Israel
- Occupations: Director, cinematographer, producer
- Spouse: Philip Touitou

Danae Elon (Hebrew: דנאי אילון; born December 23, 1970) is a documentary filmmaker and cinematographer from Jerusalem. She is based in Montreal, Quebec.

== Biography ==
Danae Elon was born in Jerusalem. She is the daughter of journalist and author Amos Elon, and Beth Elon. Danae Elon graduated from New York University in 1995.

== Film career ==
In 2009 she received the Guggenheim fellowship in the category of film. Her work has often centered around Jerusalem and the Palestinian struggle. Wild Mint, which she directed and produced, and Cut, which she photographed and co-produced, were the first films in which she attempted to reconcile state ideology and reality.

In 2001 Elon produced her first critically acclaimed film, Another Road Home, which received a grant from the Sundance Institute Documentary Program in 2003. The film premiered at the 2004 Tribeca Film Festival and was showcased in over 20 international film festivals, including IDFA, Los Angeles Film Festival, Jerusalem Film Festival, Hot Docs, Encounters South Africa and Gothenburg. Another Road Home was theatrically released in 2005 and was shown in 15 US cities. It was broadcast on the Sundance channel, BBC, Finnish, Belgian, New Zealand, Swedish, and on both Al Jazeera and Israeli television. It was cited as one of the most important films about the subject.

Her second feature documentary, Partly Private, was about male circumcision. An Israeli-Canadian co-production, it was screened on ARTE France, TV Ontario, Canal Vie, TV2 Denmark, and Channel 8 Israel.

Three other critically acclaimed and award winning documentary films by Elon are P.S. Jerusalem, The Patriarch's Room and A Sister's Song.

== Academic career ==
Elon was a lecturer at the Sapir Academic College and head of the Israeli documentary program at Cinema South International Film Festival. She is currently an adjunct lecturer at Queens University at Kingston.

== Awards and recognition ==
Her first documentary film, Never Again Forever, was released in 1996. It showcased in over 25 international film festivals and received a Golden Spire award from the San Francisco International Film Festival as well as an achievement award from the Chicago International Film Festival.

Partly Private premiered in the 2009 Tribeca film festival and won the Best New York Documentary award.

Elon won two awards for Another Road Home: a bronze medal from the Warsaw International Film Festival, and best documentary from Tursak Film Festival in Istanbul.

The Patriarch's Room won Best research and Music award at the Docaviv film festival as well as Best documentary at the Toronto Jewish Film Festival and Best Documentary at the Beyond Borders Film Festival in Greece. For A Sister's Song she received the AIDC Award for innovation in documentary filmmaking as well as an Iris Award for cinematography.

== Filmography ==
Year	Title	Credited as	Festivals and awards	Ref.
1996	Never Again, Forever	Director, producer	International Documentary Film Festival Amsterdam Hamptons International Film Festival New York Jewish Film Festival São Paulo International Film Festival San Francisco International Film Festival – Golden Spire Award Chicago International Film Festival – Achievement Award	
1998	Wild Mint	Director, producer	Jerusalem International Film Festival Lisbon International Film Festival	
2000	Cut	Producer, cinematographer	International Documentary Film Festival Amsterdam Jerusalem International Film Festival – Special Award for Cinematography Dok Leipzig	
2005	Another Road Home	Director, producer, writer, additional cinematographer	Hot Docs Tribeca Film Festival Los Angeles Film Festival Jerusalem International Film Festival Tursak International Film Festival – 1st Prize and Jury Prize Göteborg Film Festival Encounters South African International Documentary Festival Jewish Motifs International Film Festival – Bronze Medal	
2009	Partly Private	Director, writer	Tribeca Film Festival – Best New York Documentary Jewish Motifs International Film Festival – Best Representation of Israeli and Jewish contemporary Culture	
2015	P.S. Jerusalem	Director, producer, cinematographer	Toronto International Film Festival Berlin International Film Festival Doc NYC Rencontres internationales du documentaire de Montréal – Student Choice Award Haifa International Film Festival The Cinema South International Film Festival London Human Rights Watch Film Festival Geneva Human Rights Watch Film Festival Melbourne International Film Festival Zurich Human Rights Watch Film Festival Visioni Fuori Raccordo Film Festival Biografilm Festival Giffoni Film Festival	
2016	The Patriarch's Room	Director, producer, writer	Doc Aviv – Best Research Award & Special Mention of the European Critique Circle New York Jewish Film Festival	
2018	A Sister's Song	Director, producer	Doc Aviv – AIDC Award for Innovative Filmmaking	
2025	Rule of Stone			
2025	Bedrock	Producer		
