= Bedrock (2025 film) =

2025 Canadian documentary film

- Directed by: Kinga Michalska
- Written by: Kinga Michalska
- Produced by: Paul Cadieux; Ashley Duong; Danae Elon
- Cinematography: Hanna Linkowska
- Edited by: Omar Elhamy; Paul Chotel
- Music by: Radwan Moumneh
- Production company: Fimoption
- Release date: February 18, 2025 (Berlin)
- Running time: 102 minutes
- Country: Canada
- Languages: English; Polish

Bedrock is a Canadian documentary film, directed by Kinga Michalska and released in 2025. The film profiles various communities in Poland which are located on or near sites associated with the Holocaust.

== Production ==
According to Michalska, the film was inspired by a family trip to a Polish amusement park just outside of Oświęcim, and thus close to the site of the Auschwitz concentration camp; although Michalska reacted negatively to the idea once they learned of the location, and demanded that the family cancel the trip, their mother explained that many sites in the country had Holocaust-related histories, including the venue in Muranów where Michalska had recently attended a party, and that people still live in Oświęcim today.

Michalska also noted that the film had been planned as a Canadian-Polish coproduction, but had to proceed as a Canadian production alone due to the political situation in Poland at the time.

== Distribution ==
The film premiered in the Panorama Dokumente program at the 75th Berlin International Film Festival, and had its Canadian premiere at the DOXA Documentary Film Festival.

== Awards ==
The film was longlisted for the 2025 Jean-Marc Vallée DGC Discovery Award.
