= P.S. Jerusalem =

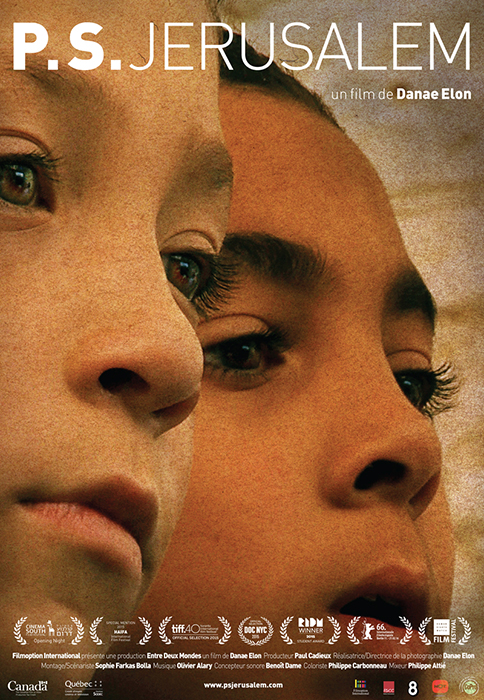
- Theatrical Release Poster
- Directed by: Danae Elon
- Written by: Sophie Farkas Bolla; Danae Elon
- Produced by: Paul Cadieux
- Starring: Philip Touitou; Tristan Touitou Elon; Andrei Touitou Elon; Amos Touitou Elon; Luai Musa Hatib
- Cinematography: Danae Elon
- Edited by: Sophie Farkas Bolla
- Music by: Olivier Alary
- Distributed by: Filmoption International
- Release date: 2015
- Running time: 87 minutes
- Countries: Israel; Canada
- Languages: English, Hebrew, Arabic

P.S. Jerusalem is a 2015 documentary film directed by Israeli filmmaker and cinematographer, Danae Elon. The film is a first person documentary journey about the director's return to Jerusalem, the city of her youth.

== Festivals and awards ==
Festival	Category	Award	Ref.
Toronto International Film Festival	TIFF Docs		
Berlin International Film Festival	Forum		
DOC NYC			
Rencontres internationales du documentaire de Montréal		Student Choice Award	
Haifa International Film Festival			
Cinema South International Film Festival			
London Human Rights Watch Film Festival			
Festival du Film et Forum International sur les Droits Humains			
Melbourne International Film Festival			
Zurich Human Rights Film Festival			
Visioni Fuori Raccordo Film Festival			
Biografilm Festival			
Giffoni Film Festival			
