= Detours Ahead =

2024 Canadian short film directed by Esther Cheung

- Directed by: Esther Cheung
- Written by: Esther Cheung
- Produced by: Esther Cheung
- Animation by: Esther Cheung
- Release date: 2024
- Running time: 8 minutes
- Country: Canada

Detours Ahead is a Canadian animated short film, written and directed by Esther Cheung and released in 2024. The film depicts a woman retracing a childhood road trip, processing her grief as she deals with the various obstacles that get in her way.

In an interview when the film was screened at the Philadelphia Asian American Film Festival, Cheung described the film as having been inspired by two cross-Canada road trips she took, driving from Vancouver to Toronto on her own and then driving back to Vancouver with her father later the same summer, and noting the significant differences in how she was perceived and treated by other people when she was alone compared to when her father, an immigrant from Hong Kong who still has a significant accent, was with her.

== Awards ==
The film won the award for Best Animation at the 2024 Forest City Film Festival.

The film received a Canadian Screen Award nomination for Best Animated Short at the 13th Canadian Screen Awards in 2025.
