= A Thousand Colours =

- French: Recomposée
- Directed by: Nadia Louis-Desmarchais
- Written by: Nadia Louis-Desmarchais
- Produced by: Paola Arrigada-Nunez
- Cinematography: Sarah Salem
- Edited by: Sophie Farkas Bolla
- Music by: Brian D'Oliveira
- Distributed by: Noble Arts
- Release date: November 13, 2025 (Doc NYC)
- Running time: 88 minutes
- Country: Canada
- Language: French

A Thousand Colours (French: Recomposée) is a Canadian documentary film, directed by Nadia Louis-Desmarchais and released in 2025. The film is a reflection on her complex identity as a biracial woman of mixed white and Haitian descent, who was placed for adoption and raised in a white family who gave her a loving upbringing but did not always know how to deal with the uniquely Black aspects of who she was.

The film premiered at Doc NYC in November 2025, followed by its Canadian premiere at the 2025 Montreal International Documentary Festival.

== Awards ==
Award	Date of ceremony	Category	Recipient	Result	Ref.
Montreal International Documentary Festival	2025	People's Choice	Nadia Louis-Desmarchais	Won	
Montreal International Documentary Festival	2025	Magnus Isacsson Award	Nadia Louis-Desmarchais	Honored	
Montreal International Documentary Festival	2025	Student Jury Award	Nadia Louis-Desmarchais	Won	
Directors Guild of Canada	2026	Jean-Marc Vallée DGC Discovery Award	Nadia Louis-Desmarchais	Longlisted	
Reelworld Film Festival	2026	Outstanding Feature Film Director	Nadia Louis-Desmarchais	Won	
