= Sophie Farkas Bolla =

Canadian film editor

Sophie Farkas Bolla is a Canadian film editor. She is most noted for her work on the films P.S. Jerusalem, for which she was a Prix Iris nominee for Best Editing in a Documentary at the 18th Quebec Cinema Awards in 2018, and The Gig Is Up, for which she was a Canadian Screen Award nominee for Best Editing in a Documentary at the 10th Canadian Screen Awards in 2022.

Her other editing credits have included the films Antoine, Angry Inuk, Roads in February (Les Routes en février), Beans, A Thousand Colours (Recomposée) and So Long Pluto (Au revoir Pluton).

She has also directed the short films Les chroniques de l'autre (2009), Istvan et la truite à fourrure (2013) and When Monsters Were Real (2016). In 2023, she released her debut feature film Adventures in the Land of Asha (Jules au pays d'Asha).
