= Cornelia Principe =

Cornelia Principe is a Canadian documentary film and television producer, who was co-founder with Matt Gallagher of Border City Pictures.

== Filmography ==
- Urban Elder - 1997
- Women on Top - 2006-07
- Diamond Road - 2007
- Air India 182 - 2008
- Grinders - 2011
- The World Before Her - 2012
- The Motherload - 2014
- How to Prepare for Prison - 2016
- Surviving Bokator - 2018
- Prey - 2019
- #Blessed - 2020
- Dispatches from a Field Hospital - 2021
- To Kill a Tiger - 2022
- Russians at War - 2024
- Shamed - 2025

== Awards ==
Award	Date of ceremony	Category	Work	Result	Ref.
Academy Awards	2024	Best Documentary Feature Film	To Kill a Tiger with Nisha Pahuja, David Oppenheim	Nominated	
Canadian Screen Awards	2013	Best Feature Length Documentary	The World Before Her with Ed Barreveld, Nisha Pahuja	Nominated	
Canadian Screen Awards	2020	Best Feature Length Documentary	Prey with Matt Gallagher	Nominated	
Canadian Screen Awards	2022	Donald Brittain Award	Dispatches from a Field Hospital with Matt Gallagher	Nominated	
Canadian Screen Awards	2023	Best Feature Length Documentary	To Kill a Tiger with Nisha Pahuja, David Oppenheim, Anita Lee, Atul Gawande	Won	
Hot Docs Canadian International Documentary Festival	2025	Don Haig Award		Won	
