= Ashley Duong =

Ashley Da-Lê Duong is a Canadian documentary filmmaker, originally from Calgary, Alberta, and currently based in Montreal, Quebec.

A graduate of the environmental studies program at McGill University, Duong began her film career shooting footage of Canada's national parks for Parks Canada.

Her debut documentary feature, A Time to Swim, was a profile of Mutang Urud, a Malaysian activist now living in Canada as a refugee. The film premiered in 2017 at the Los Angeles Asian Pacific Film Festival, where it won a Special Jury Prize, and later won the award for Best First Feature at the Toronto Reel Asian International Film Festival.

She subsequently worked principally in television for a number of years, including episodes of Exhibitionists, Canada's a Drag and Inside Felix & Paul Studios, and was a producer of Kinga Michalska's 2025 film Bedrock.

In 2024 her father, Anh Duong, published Dear Da-Lê: A Father's Memoir of the Vietnam War and the Iranian Revolution, a memoir of the difficult youth experiences, both growing up in Vietnam during the Vietnam War and then witnessing the breakout of the Iranian Revolution while attending university in Iran, which he had often struggled to share openly with his children. Ashley's Vietnamese name, Da-Lê, is the name of the village where Anh was raised.

Following the book's publication, Ashley began working on Ba's Book, a documentary film about her family travelling back to Vietnam to stage a theatrical adaptation of the book. The film premiered at the 2026 Toronto International Film Festival.
