= Anastasia Trofimova =

Russian-Canadian documentary filmmaker (born 1987)

- Анастасия Трофимова
- Born: 17 February 1987 (age 39); Moscow, Russian SFSR, Soviet Union
- Education: University of Toronto (B.A.); University of Amsterdam (M.A.)
- Occupations: Film director; producer; cinematographer

Anastasia Trofimova (Russian: Анастасия Трофимова, born February 17, 1987) is a Russian-Canadian documentary director, producer and cinematographer, most known for her work in Ukraine, Iraq, Syria and the Democratic Republic of Congo, with films like Russians at War, Her War: Women vs. ISIS, Victims of ISIS, The Road to Raqqa, Congo, My Precious and others.

== Early life ==
Anastasia Trofimova was born in Moscow, Soviet Union and immigrated to Canada at the age of 10. She has stated that her interest in Russia and her international experience influenced her work as a filmmaker across different cultures. She had moved to Russia in 2014.

== Education ==
Trofimova earned her Bachelor's degree in Communication, Culture and Information Technology from the University of Toronto and her Master's degree in International Relations from the University of Amsterdam. She speaks fluent English, Russian and intermediate Arabic and French.

== Career ==
Trofimova’s documentary work uses a fly-on-the-wall, cinema verité style inspired by Dziga Vertov’s Kino-Pravda. She had made several films in conflict zones, covering Iraq, Syria, the Democratic Republic of Congo, Russia, Ukraine. Trofimova’s work was noted for her bravery and close access to the people featured in her films.

Trofimova says she avoids turning her films into “war pornography”, rather focusing on internal paradoxes of people caught up in war. Of filming unscripted films in volatile environments she said, “you can assume filming’s going well if the crew is surprised by another turn of events. That means the viewer will be too.”

== Films ==
=== Russians at War ===
In 2024, Trofimova directed and filmed the Canadian-French documentary Russians at War, which focuses on the perspectives of Russian soldiers whom she had clandestinely followed for 7 months on the front lines.

Russians at War has been said to ignite “one of the biggest controversies ever in Canadian film”. It had been praised for being a “powerful anti-war film” and the documentary equivalent to “All Quiet on the Western Front”, a “remarkably courageous feat of documentary filmmaking”, noting the unprecedented access into the perspectives of Russian soldiers.

Ukrainian government officials and some pro-Ukraine groups criticized the documentary as "Russian propaganda". Ukrainian consul-general Oleh Nikolenko accused Trofimova of whitewashing Russian war crimes; he later stated that he had not seen the film. Many other critics of Russians at War have also not watched the film as protests and calls for cancellation began before its scheduled screenings. Opposition to Russians at War has been associated with the Ukrainian government's #nostageforrussia campaign, which advocates against the international inclusion of Russian cultural works and figures.

The film had its world premiere at the Venice Film Festival on September 5, 2024, followed by its North American premiere at the Toronto International Film Festival on September 10, 2024. According to The Hollywood Reporter, festival staff and organizers received more than 2,800 messages containing threats of violence and sexual assault directed at the festival staff and organizers. The Modern Times Review also reported that plans to disrupt screenings became known and maps of the surrounding streets and building plans were shared among the protesters, with plans to target Trofimova as she entered the theater.

Trofimova had also received a number of death threats, with TIFF consequently arranging a security detail to escort her during the premiere, to which she responded by saying, “It was shocking. You go to the war against all odds, going deeper than others because you care that much to see it for yourself, only to be attacked by people who have never been close to war.”

Following similar intimidation campaigns from the Ukrainian embassy and groups, the Zurich Film Festival, Athens International Film Festival and Docville Film Festival were forced to cancel screenings due to safety concerns.

Russians at War stirred a debate about “humanization” in cinema. Some applauded Trofimova’s empathetic approach, including Canada’s three leading newspapers, noting the absence of “dehumanization” of her characters, as well as her unprecedented access. Others, including a number of Ukrainian publications, voiced concerns about the ethics of “humanizing” Russian soldiers during the ongoing Russo-Ukrainian war, with Ukrainian producer Anna Palenchuk stating that “you cannot be so tolerant to Russians and their feelings”. Trofimova had responded to the debate by saying, “is there a list of people who we can and can’t humanize? There were people throughout history with similar lists, and those weren’t humanity’s proudest moments”.

The Ukrainian Embassy in the Netherlands and several Ukrainian publications criticized Trofimova for entering Russian-occupied Ukrainian territories without authorization from the Ukrainian government. Film critic Dieter Wieczorek disputed this criticism, arguing that expecting a filmmaker to obtain Ukrainian permission to enter territory under Russian occupation would be “nonsense”.

Following the release of the film, the Ukrainian Ministry of Culture and Strategic Communications included Trofimova in its list of individuals considered a threat to Ukraine's national security, citing what it described as her “unacceptable neutrality”. Trofimova was also added to the Myrotvorets database, known as "a hit list of enemies of Ukraine", widely criticized by human rights activists and international bodies for its intimidation campaign against journalists and public figures. Actions taken against Trofimova and Russians at War have been criticized by members of the film community, who characterized them as attempts to intimidate filmmakers addressing controversial subjects.

Russians at War has been described as the only feature-length documentary filmed from the Russian side of the front during the Russo-Ukrainian war. Trofimova has stated that, despite the risks involved in its production, she viewed making an anti-war film as her contribution to ending the Russian-Ukrainian war.

=== Her War: Women vs. ISIS ===
In 2015, Trofimova embedded with a group of recruits to the Kurdish Women’s Protection Units (YPJ) in Eastern Syria. Her War: Women vs. ISIS follows recruits Chichek, Binefsh, Amara, Golan and their commander, Tolheldan, exploring “a revolution within a revolution” and Kurdish women’s new roles in the war against the Islamic State.

Trofimova’s crew was reportedly the first international film crew granted permission to live at a YPJ base for the duration of training. The base was approximately 3 km from the front line with the Islamic State. Two weeks after the training was complete, IS broke the front line and occupied the base.

The film won the “Silver Screen Award” at the US International Film and Video Festival in 2016. Her War: Women vs. ISIS has also been included among notable works of Kurdish cinema.

=== Victims of ISIS ===
In 2015, Trofimova directed and filmed Victims of ISIS, a documentary focusing on the stories of the Yazidi community in Iraq, many of whom were victims of human trafficking, sold in slave markets by Islamic State. The documentary follows several Yazidi women who escaped captivity and Abu Shuja, a former smuggler who used his network to rescue Yazidi captives held by IS. After successfully freeing more than 500 people, Abu Shuja himself became a target of the group, which placed a $500,000 bounty on his head.

Victims of ISIS has also been included among notable works of Kurdish cinema.

=== Congo, My Precious ===
In 2016, Trofimova directed and filmed Congo, My Precious, a documentary profiling Bernard Kalume Buleri – a Congolese musician, fixer, and UN worker. Born in the year of the Democratic Republic of the Congo’s independence, Buleri’s life reflects the enduring turmoil shaped by the country’s so-called “resource curse.” Filming took place in the jungle around Bukavu, South Kivu Province.

=== The Road to Raqqa ===
In 2017, Trofimova directed and filmed The Road to Raqqa, a documentary set during the Battle of Raqqa (2017). The film follows the final advance to the besieged city from three vantage points on the road leading into Raqqa: the Kurdish Women’s Protection Units (YPJ) base, a frontline field hospital, and a base for foreign volunteers.

During filming, the crew came under attack twice from Islamic State drones and was also exposed to sniper fire.

The Road to Raqqa has also been included among notable works of Kurdish cinema.

=== Mosul Between War and Peace ===
In 2018, Trofimova directed and filmed Mosul Between War and Peace, a documentary about post-conflict life in Mosul, Iraq, following the city's liberation from Islamic State. The film examines themes of vengeance and reconciliation through Iraqi SWAT units searching for suspected IS militants, Civil Defense teams recovering bodies from the Old City, and families formerly associated with the Islamic State, including those who continue to express allegiance to the caliphate.

=== Iraqi Safe House ===
In 2018, Trofimova directed and filmed Iraqi Safe House, a documentary profiling Iraq’s first private orphanage, about its children and director, Hicham al-Dhahabi. Filming took place in Baghdad, at the Iraqi Safe House for Creativity.

Iraqi Safe House was a Finalist for Best Streaming Documentary at the New York Festivals World’s Best TV & Films Festival.

=== Sons of the Graveyard ===
In 2019, Trofimova directed and filmed Sons of the Graveyard, a documentary following hereditary undertakers in Wadi al-Salam, the world’s largest graveyard, located in Iraq. The film centers on the undertakers’ personal stories while tracing Iraq’s “history in coffins,” shaped by successive wars, with the undertakers often serving as sources of insight more reliable than official statistics.

=== Rivers of Discord: Iraq’s Water Crisis ===
In 2019, Trofimova directed and filmed Rivers of Discord: Iraq’s Water Crisis, a documentary examining the worsening ecological conditions in southern Iraq. Conceived as a warning about the consequences of failing to share water resources, the film follows two leading scientists from Nature Iraq: Azzam Alwash and Jassim al-Asadi, as they search for solutions.

=== Enslaved ===
In 2020, Trofimova directed and filmed Enslaved, embedding with “The Alternative”, a Russian NGO battling modern slavery.

=== International Productions ===
Trofimova is a recognized Canadian producer and researcher, having been awarded the Canada Screen Award for Best Editorial Research for her work on “Tales from the Organ Trade”. She was nominated the Canada Screen Award for Best Visual Research for her work on “Ice-Breaker: the ’72 Summit Series”.

She had also worked as a contributor and cinematographer for the Moscow bureaus of The New York Times, The Washington Post, The Globe and Mail and the Canadian Broadcasting Corporation.

Trofimova had worked as a Middle East correspondent for RT Documentary, with most of her films focusing on the Islamic State.

== Filmography ==
Overview of Anastasia Trofimova films
Year	Title	Director	Writer	Producer	Notes
2015	Victims of ISIS	Yes	Yes	No	Feature documentary on the Yazidis captured by ISIS and Abu Shuja, a former smuggler, who is using his network to steal them back.
2015	Her War: Women Vs. ISIS	Yes	Yes	No	Feature documentary following new recruits in the Kurdish Women's Protection Units (YPJ) who are fighting ISIS in Syria.
2017	Congo, My Precious	Yes	Yes	No	Feature documentary film illustrating how nature's bounty, instead of being a blessing, becomes a deadly curse.
2017	The Road to Raqqa	Yes	Yes	No	Documentary featuring stories from the three last stops on the road to the besieged ISIS capital of Raqqa: the Women's Protection Units (YPJ) compound, the medical point and the foreign volunteers base.
2018	Iraqi Safe House	Yes	Yes	No	Feature documentary dealing with Iraq's orphan crisis and the trials of Hicham al-Dhahabi, a Baghdad man who founded the "Iraqi Safe House for Creativity", Iraq's first private orphanage.
2018	Champions of the Spirit	Yes	Yes	No	Short documentary profiling the surviving members of the first Soviet Olympic Team (1952), which included Siege of Leningrad survivors, concentration camp prisoners and frontline soldiers.
2018	Mosul Between War and Peace	Yes	Yes	No	Short documentary examining attempts at coexistence and peace-building between people who fought ISIS and those who supported them in Mosul, Iraq.
2019	Rivers of Discord: Iraq's Water Crisis	Yes	Yes	No	Short documentary about the possible solutions to Iraq's lack of clean water.
2019	Sons of the Graveyard	Yes	Yes	No	Short documentary about the hereditary undertakers of Wadi Al-Salam in Najaf, Iraq, the world's largest cemetery.
2020	Enslaved	Yes	Yes	No	Short documentary about "Alternative", the only NGO in Russia rescuing people from modern slavery.
2024	Russians at War	Yes	Yes	Yes	Feature documentary film, with unprecedented access, following a Russian Army battalion in Ukraine.

== Awards ==
- Nominee, New Directors Competition (Russians at War), São Paulo International Film Festival
- Nominee, Best Documentary (Russians at War), Athens International Film Festival
- Nominee, Golden Eye Award (Russians at War), Zurich Film Festival
- Nominee, WIFF Prize in Canadian Film (Russians at War), Windsor International Film Festival
- Winner, Main Award (Russians at War), Signos da Noite
- Winner, Main Award (Russians at War), Zeichen der Nacht
- Nominee, "Best Visual Research" (Ice-Breaker: '72 Summit Series), Canada Screen Awards
- Winner, “Silver Screen Award” (Her War: Women vs. ISIS), US International Film and Video Festival
- Winner, "Best Editorial Research" (Tales from the Organ Trade), Canada Screen Awards
