= The Gig Is Up =

2021 Canadian film directed by Shannon Walsh

- Film poster
- Directed by: Shannon Walsh
- Written by: Shannon Walsh; Julien Goetz; Harold Crooks
- Produced by: Ina Fichman; Luc Martin-Gousset
- Cinematography: Étienne Roussy
- Edited by: Sophie Farkas Bolla
- Music by: David Chalmin
- Production companies: Les Films du Balibari; Intuitive Pictures; Les Films du Point du Jour
- Distributed by: Dogwoof Pictures
- Release date: April 23, 2021 (CPH:DOX)
- Running time: 88 minutes
- Country: Canada
- Language: English

The Gig Is Up is a 2021 Canadian documentary film, directed by Shannon Walsh. The film explores the impact of the contemporary gig economy on society.

The film premiered on April 23, 2021, at the Copenhagen International Documentary Film Festival, and had its Canadian premiere at the Hot Docs Canadian International Documentary Festival on April 29.

Sophie Farkas Bolla received a Canadian Screen Award nomination for Best Editing in a Documentary at the 10th Canadian Screen Awards in 2022.

== Reception ==
=== Critical response ===
The Gig is Up received positive reviews from film critics. On Rotten Tomatoes, it has a 100% approval rating based on reviews from 11 critics.
