= The Oslo Diaries =

2018 Israeli-Canadian documentary film

- Directed by: Mor Loushy; Daniel Sivan
- Cinematography: Alex Margineanu; Avner Shahaf
- Release date: January 2018
- Running time: 97 minutes
- Countries: Israel; Canada

The Oslo Diaries is a 2018 Israeli-Canadian documentary directed by Mor Loushy and Daniel Sivan about Middle Eastern peace talks at the Oslo Accords in the 1990s between Israel and Palestine. The film premiered at the 2018 Sundance Film Festival, and had its broadcast debut on HBO September 13, 2018.

It featured Shimon Peres in one of his last interviews before his death.

== Accolades ==
Nominated-Grand Jury Prize, Sundance 2018

Nominated-Outstanding Historical Documentary, 40th News and Documentary Emmy Awards
