= Kino-Pravda =

Series of newsreels that captured early Soviet-era daily life

Kino-Pravda No.23 (1925)

Kino-Pravda (Russian: Кино-Правда, lit. 'Film Truth') was a series of 23 newsreels by Dziga Vertov, Elizaveta Svilova, and Mikhail Kaufman launched in June 1922. Vertov referred to the twenty-three issues of Kino-Pravda as the first work by him where his future cinematic methods can be observed.

== Overview ==
Working mainly during the 1920s, Vertov promoted the concept of "kino-pravda", or "film-truth", through his newsreel series. His driving vision was to capture fragments of actuality which, when organized together, showed a deeper truth which could not be seen with the naked eye. In the Kino-Pravda series, Vertov focused on everyday experiences, eschewing bourgeois concerns and filming marketplaces, bars, and schools instead, sometimes with a hidden camera, without asking permission first.

The episodes of Kino-Pravda usually did not include reenactments or stagings (one exception is the segment about the trial of the Socialist Revolutionaries: the scenes of the selling of the newspapers on the streets and the people reading the papers in the trolley were both staged for the camera). The cinematography is simple, functional, and unelaborated. Twenty-three issues of the series were produced over a period of three years; each issue lasted about twenty minutes and usually covered three topics. The stories were typically descriptive, not narrative, and included vignettes and exposés, showing for instance the renovation of a trolley system, the organization of farmers into communes, and the trial of Socialist Revolutionaries; one story shows starvation in the nascent Marxist state. Propagandistic tendencies are also present, but with more subtlety, in the episode featuring the construction of an airport: one shot shows the former Czar's tanks helping prepare a foundation, with an intertitle reading "Tanks on the labor front".

Vertov intended an active relationship with his audience in the series — in the final segment he includes contact information — but by the fourteenth episode the series had become so experimental that some critics dismissed Vertov's efforts as "insane".

The term "kino pravda", though it translates from Russian as "film truth", is not to be confused with the cinéma vérité movement in documentary film, which also translates as "film truth". Cinéma vérité was similarly marked by the intention of capturing reality "warts and all", but became popular in France in the 1960s.
