= Windsor International Film Festival =

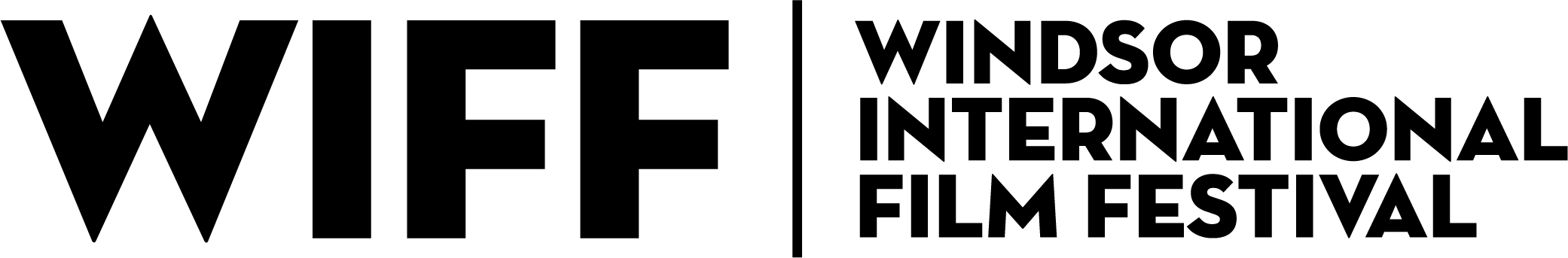

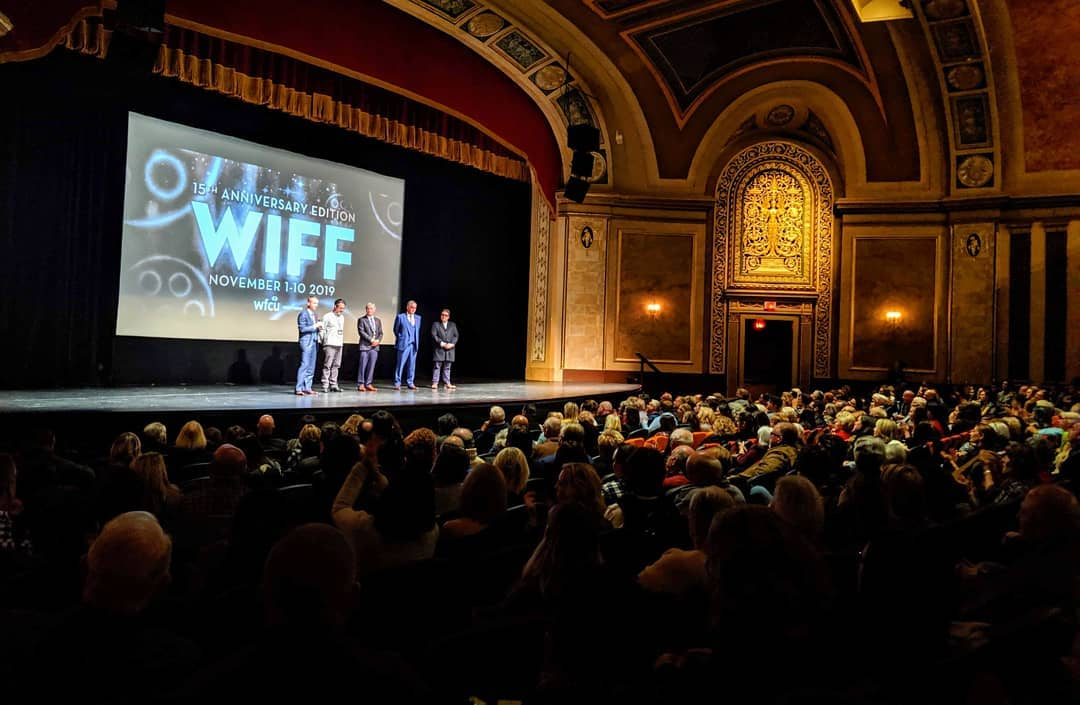
- An audience at the 2019 Windsor International Film Festival fills The Capitol's Pentastar theatre.
- Location: Windsor, Ontario, Canada
- Founded: 2005
- Language: International
- Website: windsorfilmfestival.com

The Windsor International Film Festival (WIFF) is a cultural, charitable organization whose mission is to recognize and celebrate the art of cinema by showcasing Canadian and International films and filmmakers. When the festival first took place, it had 1,000 people in attendance and screened 20 films over the course of 2 days.

Marking its growth, in 2009 the festival screened 25 films and sold 1,500 tickets. In 2011 it was attended by 8,000 people. By the time of the 9th festival in 2013, the festival screened 65 films over a 6-day period, with an attendance by 14,000 people under the guidance of executive director Vincent Georgie, who replaced the retiring Peter Coady. In 2016, the festival sold over 20,000 tickets, and was the 2nd-largest volunteer-run film festival in Canada.

WIFF 2017 saw ticket sales increase to 22,000, while in 2018, they went up by 10 percent. That same year, 143 films were screened in three different venues: the Capitol Theatre; St. Clair College's Chrysler Theatre, and the Windsor Armouries. The increase in attendance prompted organizers to extend the festival from 7 days to 10 days the following year. 2019 was another record-breaking year with over 42,000 in attendance for WIFF's 15th anniversary. The creation of WIFF Alley as well a partnership with Netflix was established.

Due to the COVID-19 pandemic, WIFF was cancelled in both 2020 and 2021, and WIFF Under the Stars was created in 2020 as an alternative.

== History ==
The Windsor International Film Festival was created in July 2005 by late businessman Mark Boscariol and Dennis Perlin (then head of Enterprise Windsor). Boscariol had already been working on and off with the idea of hosting a film festival similar to the Toronto International Film Festival (TIFF). Boscariol and Perlin quickly assembled a team to help put it in motion, one that consisted of marketing expert Debi Croucher as executive director (a role that now belongs to Vincent Georgie); Kim Spirou for publicity; Lou Tortola of eLiquid Communications; Gordon Orr, CEO of Tourism Windsor Essex Peele Island, and filmmakers Otto Buj and Nick Shields as programmers. Buj helped to secure a partnership with Film Circuit, TIFF's film distribution arm.

The Windsor International Film Festival debuted in November 2005, just five months after Boscariol and Perlin's collaboration. Its first screening was Deepa Mehta's "Water". The film was back for the festival's 10th year celebration. WIFF is now so popular that it requires three venues to accommodate the number of attendees that keep growing each year.

=== Goals and Values ===
WIFF is a not-for-profit organization with the intent to celebrate the art of cinema by showcasing Canadian and international film and filmmakers through unique programming, education, and exhibition. WIFF also aims to strengthen and enrich the community while promoting the creative economy.

=== Notable Guest Appearances ===
Philippe Falardeau, director of Monsieur Lazhar, in 2011.

Luke Kirby, star of Take This Waltz, also starring Michelle Williams, Seth Rogen, and Sarah Silverman, and directed by Sarah Polley, in 2011.

Louise Archambault, director of opening night film Gabrielle, in 2013.

Katie Boland and Jennifer Jonas, star and producer, respectively, of Gerontophilia in 2014.

Maxime Giroux, director of Felix and Meira, in 2014.

Filmmaker Norman Jewison, the first recipient of WIFF's Lifetime Achievement Award, in 2014.

Cornelia Principe, producer of the documentary The World Before Her in 2014.

Actress Lois Smith, the second recipient of WIFF's Lifetime Achievement Award, in 2017.

Steve Young, subject of the documentary Bathtubs Over Broadway, in 2018.

Actress Shohreh Aghdashloo, first recipient of WIFF's Spotlight Award, in 2019.

Sturla Gunnarsson director of Final Offer in 2019.

Matt Gallagher, director of Prey and Dispatches from a Field Hospital, in 2019 and 2021, respectively.

Joey Klein, director of Castle in the Ground, in 2019.

Joshua Riehl, director of the documentary The Russian Five, in 2019.

Martha Rehoe and Joan Tosoni, directors of the documentary Gordon Lightfoot: If You Could Read My Mind, 2019.

=== WIFF 365 ===
WIFF 365 began in January 2018 in response to the record-breaking ticket sales of 2017s festival. Film screenings took place once a month at the Capitol Theatre; the first two shown was "Loving Vincent" and "Breathe." The event became so popular that it expanded to a weekly summer series in partnership with Downtown Windsor Business Improvement Association. Additional screenings were added for Canada Day and Pride Weekend. Vincent Georgie, WIFF's Executive Director and Chief Programmer explained that WIFF 365 was created because "Our audience has told us for a number of years that they love WIFF and they love the films and they want to see them more often. More and more people have experienced WIFF and fallen in love with the movies and made it an event. When you're having that much fun for a week in November, you start thinking about how can I have some of this fun year round?"

WIFF Alley, supported by two major sponsors – CUPE 82K and Ward 3 Councillor Rino Bortolin – occupied a space between the Capitol and Chrysler Theatres (combining Chatham and University Avenue) consisting of murals created by commissioned artists and strung-up lights, where film lovers could connect and socialize. WIFF Village, sponsored by the Tourism Essex Pelee Island, occurred during the second weekend of the festival, closing University Avenue between Pelisster and Victoria to erect a tent as another space for socializing.

=== WIFF Under the Stars ===
WIFF Under the Stars was created in 2020 after the COVID-19 pandemic necessitated the cancellation of November's festival that year. The drive-in event, which accommodated up to 80 cars, took place in the summer at the city's downtown waterfront where family friendly and classic matinees and double feature evenings were screened on a LED screen over two and a half weeks. The event had the support of community partners such as Mayor Drew Dilkens.

== Awards ==
WIFF's first major prize, the Lifetime Achievement Award, was presented to filmmaker Norm Jewison in 2014. In 2017, it was presented to actress Lois Smith.

The LiUNA! 625 People's Choice Award went to the movie Trumbo, starring Bryan Cranston, in 2015, its inaugural year; Maudie, starring Ethan Hawke, in 2016, Loving Vincent, an animated film about the life of Dutch painter Vincent Van Gogh, in 2017; The Russian Five, based on the true story about the Detroit Red Wings, in 2018, and Prey in 2019.

In 2019, the very first WIFF Prize in Canadian Film was awarded to Myriam Verreault, director of Kuessipan. Verreault donated her $10,000 prize to an Indigenous scholarship on Indigenous People's Day.

The first recipient of the Spotlight Award in 2019 was actress Shohreh Aghdashloo.

The Mark Boscariol 48-Hour Flick Fest is a juried competition for filmmakers of all levels with $1350 in prizes and the screenings includes award presentations for eight awards categories include Cinematography, Directing, Editing, and Best Film. Launched in 2019, it was named in honour of WIFF co-founder Mark Boscariol, who died in 2018.

== Program Sections ==
The Windsor International Film Festival has been partnered with Hot Docs since 2014. Hot Docs has been North America’s largest documentary film festival, featuring 200 films from Canada and around the world. Every year since its partnership with Hot Docs, WIFF has selected a slate of documentaries to add to their annual lineup.

Midnight Madness is an interactive experience that encourages the audience to respond to films by yelling and throwing things at the screen. The films selected are deliberately provocative, such as Tommy Wiseau’s “The Room.”

Spotlight on Architecture began in 2013, with the Windsor Region Society of Architects (WRSA) joining forces with WIFF to promote four films that bring attention to issues surrounding communities and public spaces, the built environment, the creative process, and the role of architecture and design in the modern world.

Le Francophone Films is presented by Radio-Canada. The Windsor International Film Festival showcases multiple francophone films every year, covering several genres.

In August 2018, WIFF partnered with Pride Fest announcing WIFF 365 Presents: Pride Weekend, which is set aside to feature LGTBQ2+-themed films to celebrate.

Women of WIFF a festival component supported by the Windsor Office of the President, showcases a film from their Official Selection every year. It was created to ensure that women's voices are heard, experiences shared, and viewpoints discussed through film. Tickets to a screening and private reception featuring special guests can be purchased for $100.

WIFF Local is an initiative wherein local filmmakers can submit short or feature films for programming consideration. Each submission is judged by a panel of WIFF programmers.
