= Prey (2019 Canadian film) =

- Film poster
- Directed by: Matt Gallagher
- Produced by: Matt Gallagher; Cornelia Principe
- Cinematography: Matt Gallagher
- Edited by: Nick Hector
- Music by: Ohad Benchetrit; Justin Small
- Production company: Border City Pictures
- Release date: April 26, 2019 (Hot Docs)
- Running time: 88 minutes
- Country: Canada
- Language: English

Prey is a 2019 Canadian documentary film, directed by Matt Gallagher. An examination of sexual abuse in the Catholic Church, the film centres on Rod McLeod, a man who is suing the church for restitution after having been abused in childhood by priest William Hodgson "Hod" Marshall, and includes testimonial interviews from some of Marshall's other victims.

The film premiered on April 26, 2019 at the Hot Docs Canadian International Documentary Festival. It won the festival's Rogers Audience Award for Best Canadian Documentary and the Directors Guild of Canada Jury Prize.

The film received two Canadian Screen Award nominations at the 8th Canadian Screen Awards in 2020, for Best Feature Length Documentary and Best Editing in a Documentary.

== Plot summary ==
Fifty-five years after his abuse by Father William "Hod" Hodgson Marshall, Rod MacLeod decides to bring a civil suit against the Basilian Fathers of Toronto, a Roman Catholic religious order, to expose the way they continually shielded the sexual offender priest, ignoring complaints and repeatedly reassigning him to different parishes that were unaware of his history. MacLeod states, "In some ways I think of the Church as the main perpetrator…they enabled the physical perpetrator to hide, to move, to do again over, and over again". He questions why the Church fights against the victims and not against the abusers.

Documents provided by the Church revealed that Marshall became a novice in 1942 and he was still acting until at least 1996 (54 years). None of the papers in Marshall's personnel file indicated that he was an abuser of children or had been in medical treatment. The personnel file did state, "His great interest in boys makes him neglect his theological studies."

Plaintiff’s Attorney Rob Talach prepares for the civil suit by staging a mock trial to determine how a volunteer jury would respond to their arguments. The mock jury predicts an award of $2,250,000.

The plaintiff's key evidence includes a video of the civil deposition of Father Marshall on December 19, 2012, admitting to pleading guilty to the sexual abuse of 17 victims—mostly boys at schools where the priest worked—and to having been convicted in June 2011 of that sexual abuse and other crimes. Sentenced to a 2-year prison term, Marshall was released on parole after 16 months. In his deposition, Marshall admits to having confessed to four spiritual directors over the time he offended, but that none of the advisors had suggested he needed outside assistance or counseling. He expresses no feeling of guilt or remorse, though he admits to knowing his actions were a criminal offense, a violation of the Ten Commandments, and a violation of his vow of chastity. Originally a co-defendant in the civil suit, Marshall died before the case came to trial.

Father David Katulski introduces himself as "the public face of the Basilian Fathers" and states that he "walked with Marshall through his whole journey", from first meeting with him as Vicar general until the day Marshall died, because "we don’t abandon our brother when things get tough; we journey with them through their own death and resurrection hopefully.”

At the time of the documentary, Talach, proud of being dubbed "the priest hunter," has filed 395 civil suits against the Church. He states that about 2% of such cases go to trial; most end in settlement, due to shame and apprehension on the victim's side and the Church wishing to avoid further scandal.

After 4 years of failed negotiations, all attempts at settlement through mediation are unsuccessful and the civil case proceeds to trial to assess the damage and determine compensation for MacLeod. Despite being offered $615,000 to avoid a trial, MacLeod declines the offer, risking substantial debt if his civil suit is unsuccessful.

In the plaintiff's opening statement, Talach argues that the defendants are on trial for the conduct of Father Marshall and as well as their own conduct. Comparing Marshall to a toxic barrel of waste that the Church kept moving from location to location, he asserts that every time there was a complaint, the reaction was to just move the barrel to another community, and not tell that other community that it was a leaky barrel. In their opening statement the defense admits the sexual abuse but denies that MacLeod suffers a life-long trauma that would impact financial earnings, thus asserting that MacLeod is undeserving of punitive damages.

MacLeod is the first witness, testifying over 2 days that he had been abused between 1963 and 1967 when he was a student at St. Charles College high school in Sudbury, starting in grade 9, with MacLeod intimated by the priest's status. MacLeod was a victim of about 50 acts of oral sex and fondling by Marshall. For 55 years he had buried the experience, and now he is determined to "speak it out" to finally start to heal the wounds.

When asked, Katulski comments "Did I believe all of Rod’s testimony? To the best as any human person can without knowing everything and having been there themselves, he was credible, yes." One week into the trial, the Church offers $1,000,000 to settle the case, but MacLeod is determined to continue the litigation.

Other victims of Father Marshall testify. Jerry Boyle, who settled his own case out of court for $385,000, testifies that Marshall assaulted him in an empty classroom and that during the abuse, "a priest opened the door, walked in, turned around and said ‘excuse me’ and walked out again. He could see exactly what Marshall was doing." On another occasion, "He was assaulting me in his bedroom when another priest walked in―had somebody with him―and said ‘oh, this room is busy.’" When the attorney for the Basilians asks, "Is it possible that they didn’t see you?," Boyle replies, "Only if they had their eyes closed." At confession at Sacred Heart Church, he told the confessor that a priest was "touching impure parts of my body." The confessor told him it was his fault and to stop doing what he was doing.

Ted Holland, who settled his case out of court for $28,000, testifies that when Marshall first abused him, the priest "whispered in my ear…if I tell anybody I would be going to Hell." Holland told his parents what happened, and his father, who could barely speak English, reported to the school authorities that his son said that Father Marshall "touched him" in an inappropriate way. The administrator priest said that he talked to Ted's teachers and determined that he was "a good student" but prone to "exaggerate" with a "very vivid imagination."

Patrick McMahon, who settled his case out of court for $405,000, testifies that Marshall was like part of his family, which was honored to have the priest stay at their house. Marshall abused Patrick in his own home, in his own bed, in the room next to his parents’. McMahon resents that the Church continues to not hold to account "those who knew"―the bishops, cardinals, fellow priests―and that no one is defrocked and expelled for committing abuse.

Journalist Mary Ormsby, who followed the cases against the Church, explains why there is not more of a flood of cases against the Church. The church keeps it "under wraps," routinely settling cases out of court with nondisclosure agreements.

Father Katulski rationalizes, "the language of ‘coverup’ ... speaks of some kind of intentionality on the part of individuals who are deceased...who I’ve respected and knew as good men and good priests. I believe in my heart of hearts...that they were doing what they felt was the best practice of the day."

Talach states, "...in 1992 when they find out he’s abused upwards of 50 boys or more" they don't tell the police, they don't tell CAS, they don't even reach out to try to find the victims. "They just close the book on it...In 1996 nobody can say 'We didn’t know' and 'it was a moral failing' and 'we didn’t know better'...The most educated international worldly group of folks, a sub-unit of the Roman Catholic Church, is basically using the defense of 'duh, we didn’t know better.'”

According to Talach, the Church's defense expert, Dr. Jeff McMaster, did an interview and psychological evaluation of MacLeod to find any other reason why he had difficulty in life. Testifying that it would be highly unusual for someone to be that badly affected through the balance of his life, McMaster opined in his report on MacLeod that the sexual abuse may have "enhanced his self-esteem." When challenged, McMaster admits that his expertise is in assessing the abusers, not in assessing victims of sexual abuse. Talach asserts that McMaster's testimony had previously provided an opinion that kept a babysitter who created pornography with children and with bestiality from being classified a designated long-term offender.

On April 26, 2018, the jury verdict awards McLeod $2,570,181, the largest award of damages against the Church in Canada at the time. Initially, Father Katulski says that the Church would take responsibility, pay, and rectify matters. However, the Church appeals the verdict less than a month later. On advice of his attorney, Father Katulski refuses to say why the Church decided to appeal.

The case and documentary extended over 10 years. "It was always a game of cat and mouse," MacLeod says "I was the mouse." "When it came right down to it, they reacted in a way in which any profit-making organization would. Never will you see the change come from inside the Church...My whole purpose of going to trial was not money. My whole purpose was to get the story out into the public as much as I possibly could. Not just for myself but for all the others who had been sexually abused just as I had. That to me was the best thing that could have happened out of this trial."

== Epilogue ==
On April 30, 2020, the Supreme Court of Canada handed down a decision against the appeal of the $2.5 million judgment against the Basilian Fathers of Toronto for sexual abuse inflicted by Rev. William "Hod" Hodgson Marshall, upholding the jury's verdict and award.

“'I hope this final victory will give hope to other sexual abuse victims to come forward and seek justice through the courts,' said abuse survivor Rod MacLeod, who sued the Basilians for the abuse he suffered at the hands of Marshall. 'It is possible to achieve justice in Canada.'"
