= Matt Gallagher (filmmaker) =

Canadian filmmaker

- Born: Windsor, Ontario, Canada
- Education: University of Windsor
- Known for: Documentaries
- Notable work: Prey
- Spouse: Cornelia Principe
- Awards: Rogers Audience Award (2019)

Matt Gallagher is a Canadian film director, producer and cinematographer from Windsor, Ontario, who was cofounder with Cornelia Principe of Border City Pictures.

== Career ==
Gallagher has directed documentaries for History Television, CBC, BBC, The History Channel the Food Network and W Network.

In 2000, he won two Golden Sheaf Awards, Best of Festival and Best Short Subject, at the Yorkton Film Festival for the film Cass.

In 2006 he was nominated for a Gemini Award for Best History Documentary Program for the CBC documentary Vimy: Carved in Stone. In 2013 Gallagher's documentary Grinders was nominated for the Canadian Screen Award Best Direction in a Documentary Program or Series.

In 2019, Gallagher won the $50,000 Rogers Audience Award for Best Canadian Documentary for Prey at the Hot Docs Canadian International Documentary Festival and the DGC Special Jury Prize - Canadian Feature Documentary. In 2019, he also won Directors Guild of Canada's award for Best Picture Editing - Documentary and the Allan King Award for Excellence in Documentary for Prey.

In 2020 Prey was nominated for Best Feature Length Documentary and Best Editing in a Feature Documentary at the 8th Canadian Screen Awards. His 2021 television documentary Dispatches from a Field Hospital was a nominee for the Donald Brittain Award at the 10th Canadian Screen Awards in 2022.

== Filmography ==
- Cass, 1999
- Vimy: Carved in Stone, 2006
- Vimy Ridge: From Heaven to Hell, 2007
- The Rise and Fall of the Grumpy Burger, 2008
- You Gotta Have a Gimmick, 2009
- Grinders, 2011
- In Her Footsteps: The Story of Kateri Tekakwitha, 2012
- How to Prepare for Prison, 2016
- Prey, 2019
- Dispatches from a Field Hospital, 2021
- Shamed, 2025
