= List of Canadian films of 2025 =

This is a list of Canadian films released in 2025:

Title	Director	Cast	Notes	Ref
0004NGEL	Eli Jean Tahchi			
20 Crickets	Zha Babaieva			
100 Sunset	Kunsang Kyirong			
After the Ashes (Oraison)	Laetitia Demessence	Diana Leon, Francis Ducharme, Louise Bédard, Martin Dubreuil		
Agatha's Almanac	Amalie Atkins	Agatha Bock		
Aisha's Story	Elizabeth Vibert, Chen Wang			
Akashi	Mayumi Yoshida	Mayumi Yoshida, Hana Kino, Ryo Tajima, Kunio Murai		
Aki	Darlene Naponse			
Ambush (Kameen)	Yassmina Karajah			
Amir My Little Prince (Amir mon petit prince)	Julien Cadieux			
Anna Kiri	Francis Bordeleau	Catherine Brunet, Anne-Marie Cadieux, Rosalie Bonenfant, Maxime de Cotret, Benoît McGinnis, Caroline Néron		
Another Light on the Road: Robert Frank and June Leaf's Canadian Home	Katherine Whalen, John Parlante			
Any Other World	Ben Pickles	Bruce Greenwood		
The Art of Adventure	Alison Reid			
At the Place of Ghosts (Sk+te’kmujue’katik)	Bretten Hannam	Forrest Goodluck, Blake Alec Miranda, Glen Gould, Brandon Oakes		
Aversion	Thom Fitzgerald			
Ballistic	Chad Faust			
Barbaracadabra	Barbara Ulrich, Renaud Lessard			
Barbie Boomer	Marc Joly-Corcoran			
Bassima's Womb (Le ventre de Bassima)	Babek Aliassa	Maxine Denis, Nico Lagarde, Antoine Yared, Martine Francke, Isabelle Cyr, Marie Tifo		
The Bearded Girl	Jody Wilson			
Bedrock	Kinga Michalska			
Best Boy	Jesse Noah Klein	Caroline Dhavernas, Aaron Abrams, Marc Bendavid, Lise Roy		
Betrayal	Lena Macdonald			
Bif Naked	Pollyanna Hardwicke-Brown, Jennifer Abbott	Bif Naked		
Blood Lines	Gail Maurice	Dana Solomon, Derica Lafrance, Gail Maurice, Tamara Podemski		
Blue Heron	Sophy Romvari	Eylul Guven, Amy Zimmer, Ádám Tompa, Iringó Réti		
Blueberry Grunt	Sherry White	Joel Thomas Hynes, Liisa Repo-Martell		
BOA	Alexandre Dostie			
Bots	Rich Williamson			
Bread Will Walk	Alex Boya	Jay Baruchel		
A Breed Apart	Adam Belanger, David Lafontaine	Joshua Close, Isaac Highams, Krista Bridges, Stuart Hughes		
Brief Somebodies	Andy Reid	Aldrin Bundoc, Matt O'Connor, Noor Kaur Dhandha		
The Bruce Peninsula	Matthew Poitras			
Buffet Infinity	Simon Glassman	Kevin Singh, Claire Theobald, Donovan Workun		
Cactus Pears (Sabar Bonda)	Rohan Parashuram Kanawade	Bhushaan Manoj, Suraaj Suman, Jayshri Jagtap	India-Canada-UK coproduction	
Calorie	Eisha Marjara	Ellora Patnaik, Anupam Kher, Ashley Ganger, Shanaya Dhillon-Birmhan, Dolly Ahluwalia		
Can You Feel It Now?	Isak Vaillancourt			
Cardboard City (Ville Jacques-Carton)	Jean-Marc E. Roy, André Forcier	Pierre Curzi, Michèle Deslauriers, Gaston Lepage, Sandrine Bisson, France Castel, Charlotte Aubin		
Casas Muertas	Rosana Matecki			
Chiennes de faïence	Marie-Hélène Panisset	Sonia Quirion, Megan Saunders, Charles Papasoff, Jeremyah Mogni, Skye Dorval, Nabila Ben Youssef		
The Chinatown Diner	Lawrence Le Lam	Aileen Wu, Curtis Lum, Andrea Bang, Olivia Cheng, Tzi Ma		
Clan of the Painted Lady	Jennifer Chiu			
Clear Sky	Shawn Clearsky Davis, Michael Del Monte			
Compulsive Liar 2 (Menteuse)	Émile Gaudreault	Anne-Élisabeth Bossé, Antoine Bertrand, Catherine Chabot, Luc Senay, Véronique Le Flaguais, Didier Lucien, Rémy Girard, Pierrette Robitaille, Martin Drainville		
Conceiving Clara	Tarique Qayumi			
Copper (Cobre)	Nicolás Pereda			
The Cost of Heaven (Gagne ton ciel)	Mathieu Denis	Samir Guesmi		
Crise d'ado	Marc-André Lavoie	Iani Bédard, Rose Choinière, Antonin Bouffard, Vanel Lavoie, Sonia Vachon, Réal Bossé, Emmanuel Bilodeau, Maxime Morin		
Crocodile Eyes	Ingrid Veninger			
Cutting Through Rocks	Sara Khaki, Mohammad Reza Eyni		Multinational coproduction	
Dancing on the Elephant	Julia Neill, Jacob Z. Smith	Mary Walsh, Sheila McCarthy, Amanda Brugel		
Dangerous Animals	Sean Byrne	Hassie Harrison, Josh Heuston, Rob Carlton, Ella Newton, Liam Greinke, Jai Courtney	American-Australian-Canadian coproduction	
Dead Lover	Grace Glowicki	Grace Glowicki, Ben Petrie		
Death Does Not Exist (La Mort n'existe pas)	Félix Dufour-Laperrière			
Deathstalker	Steven Kostanski			
Degrassi: Whatever It Takes	Lisa Rideout			
Deleau: Cinema Unchained (Deleau : Le cinéma en liberté)	Michel La Veaux			
Demons	Kelly Fyffe-Marshall			
Designed by Preeti	Gayatri Bajpai	Rashami Rustagi, Ranjita Chakravarty, Anna Khaja, Sangeeta Agrawal, Jay Charan, Frank Lawson		
A Dickens of a Christmas	Gillian McKercher	Ashley Newbrough, Kaya Coleman, Chad Rook		
Dinner with Friends	Sasha Leigh Henry	Tattiawna Jones, Izaak Smith, Andrew Bushell, Alex Spencer, Tymika Tafari, Rakhee Morzaria, Michael Ayres, Leighton Alexander Williams		
Dish Pit	Anna Hopkins			
Do Us Part	Clare Preuss	Michelle Thrush, Andy Curtis, Imajyn Cardinal, Linda Kee, Katherine Rawlinson, Garret Smith, Joel David Taylor, Telly James		
Dolly Baby: Rhythm and Flesh	Bouchera Tahraoui			
Doom Boogie	George Assimakopoulos			
The Draft	Jephté Bastien	Iman Ayorinde, Hasani Freeman, Denya Normil, Darragh Mondoux, David La Haye		
Dream Eater	Alex Lee Williams, Mallory Drumm, Jay Drakulic	Alex Lee Williams, Mallory Drumm		
A Dying Tree (La Peau de l'autre)	Vincent René-Lortie	Charles-Alexis Desgagnés		
Elsewhere at Night (Ailleurs la nuit)	Marianne Métivier	Camille Rutherford, Garance Marillier, Victor Andrés Trelles Turgeon, Émile Schneider, Amaryllis Tremblay		
Endless Cookie	Seth Scriver, Peter Scriver			
Everest Dark	Jereme Watt			
Fan	Philippe Berthelet			
Fanon	Jean-Claude Barny	Alexandre Bouyer, Déborah François, Stanislas Merhar, Mehdi Senoussi	International coproduction	
Fanny	Yan England	Milya Corbeil Gauvreau, Adélaïde Schoofs, Léokim Beaumier-Lépine, Éric Bruneau, Magalie Lépine-Blondeau, Claude Legault, Hubert Proulx, Marilyse Bourke, Tanya Brideau		
Feed	Nancy Urich			
Felt	Blake Williams			
Finch & Midland	Timothy Yeung	Anthony Wong, Patrick Tam, Harriet Yeung, Theresa Lee, Nina Paw		
The Flayed, Part 2 (Les Écorchés, partie 2)	Luca Jalbert			
Follies (Folichonneries)	Eric K. Boulianne	Eric K. Boulianne, Catherine Chabot, Florence Blain Mbaye, Étienne Galloy, Agathe Ledoux		
Forbidden Music	Barbara Hager			
Foreigner	Ava Maria Safai	Rose Dehgan, Chloë Macleod		
Forward	Nic Collar	Clayton March, Tanner March		
Friends First (Les Copains d'abord)	Thomas Laliberté, Marilou Muller			
Fruit Is Ripe	Yuqi Kang			
The Furies (Les Furies)	Mélanie Charbonneau	Gabrielle Côté, Anne-Élisabeth Bossé, France Castel, Juliette Gosselin, Aurélia Arandi-Longpré, Debbie Lynch-White, Nathalie Doummar, Sandrine Bisson		
The Future (L'Avenir)	Emmanuel Schwartz			
The Gardener and the Dictator	Hui Wang			
The Girl Who Cried Pearls (La jeune fille qui pleurait des perles)	Chris Lavis, Maciek Szczerbowski			
The Gnawer of Rocks (Mangittatuarjuk)	Louise Flaherty			
Gold Bars: Who the Fuck Is Uncle Ludwig?	Billie Mintz	Glenn Feldman		
Hair of the Bear	Alexandre Trudeau, James McLellan	Malia Baker, Roy Dupuis, Robert Naylor, Jonathan Lawrence, Catherine Bérubé		
Halfway Haunted	Samuel Rudykoff	Hannan Younis, Kristian Bruun, Sugar Lyn Beard		
The Hands of the World (Les mains du monde)	Julien Cadieux			
Hangashore	Justin Oakey	Hera Hilmar, James Frecheville, Stephen Oates		
Hank est en ville	Feber E. Coyote			
Have You Heard Judi Singh?	Baljit Sangra			
Healer	Chelsea McMullan			
L'Héritier des secrets	Mohamed Nadif	Younes Bouab, Nadia Kounda, Mounia Zahzam, Nisrin Erradi, Mehdi Bahmad	International coproduction	
Hemela	Pirouz Nemati			
Honey Bunch	Madeleine Sims-Fewer, Dusty Mancinelli			
The Human Under the Bed	Euan O'Leary			
I Am Pleased	Vanessa Magic	Millie Davis, Chris Locke, Emma Hunter, Rodrigo Fernandez-Stoll		
I Fear Blue Skies	Salar Pashtoonyar			
I Lost Sight of the Landscape (J’ai perdu de vue le paysage)	Sophie Bédard Marcotte			
In Cold Light	Maxime Giroux	Maika Monroe, Allan Hawco, Troy Kotsur, Helen Hunt, Patrick Sabongui		
In Good Hands	Naomi Okabe			
In the Room	Brishkay Ahmed	Mozhdah Jamalzadah, Vida Samadzai, Nelofer Pazira		
Inner-Walls (Au pied du mur)	Alexandra Elkin			
Invisibles	Junna Chif	Nadia Essadiqi, Catherine Bérubé, Stéphane Crête, Floyd Lapierre-Poupart		
It Comes in Waves	Fitch Jean	Adrian Walters, Nendia Lewars, Oluniké Adeliyi		
Ivan	Damian Fannon			
James Bay 1975: The Shock of Two Nations (Baie James 1975 : le choc des Nations)	Mélanie Lameboy, Myriam Berthelet, Mathieu Fournier			
Jazz Infernal	Will Niava			
Karupy	Kalainithan Kalaichelvan	Sumathy Balaram		
Kindergarten (Jardin d'enfants)	Jean-François Caissy			
King Arthur's Night	John Bolton	Niall McNeil, Marcus Youssef, Veda Hille		
King's Court	Serville Poblete			
Klee	Gavin Baird			
Levers	Rhayne Vermette	Val Vint, Andrina Turenne, Will George		
Lhasa	Sophie Leblond	Lhasa de Sela		
Lilith Fair: Building a Mystery	Ally Pankiw			
Little Lorraine	Andy Hines	Stephen Amell, J Balvin, Sean Astin		
Little Victories (Les petites victoires)	Rafaël Beauchamp	Jean-Philippe Lehoux, Millie-Jeanne Drouin		
Lloyd Wong, Unfinished	Lesley Loksi Chan			
Love, Harold	Alan Zweig			
Lovely Day (Mille secrets mille dangers)	Philippe Falardeau	Neil Elias, Hassan Mahbouba, Rose-Marie Perreault, Paul Ahmarani		
Loya	Sibel Guvenc			
Lucid	Ramsey Fendall, Deanna Milligan	Caitlin Taylor, Vivian Vanderpuss		
Lunatic: The Luna Vachon Story	Kate Kroll	Luna Vachon		
Mad Dog (Molosse)	Marc-Antoine Lemire			
Made for U	Nathanael Draper			
Magnetosphere	Nicola Rose			
Mare's Nest	Ben Rivers			
Marriaginalia	Hannah Cheesman			
Masterpiece	Evan Bard			
Maurice	Serge Giguère			
Maya & Samar	Anita Doron			
La Mayordomía	Martin Edralin			
Meadowlarks	Tasha Hubbard	Michael Greyeyes, Carmen Moore, Alex Rice, Michelle Thrush		
The Mechanics of Borders (La mécanique des frontières)	Hubert Caron-Guay	Dylan Walsh, Sophie Fekete, Ben Peters, Robert Montcalm		
Messy Legends	Kelly Kay Hurcomb, James Watts			
Michelle Ross: Unknown Icon	Alison Duke	Michelle Ross		
Middle Life	Pavan Moondi	Leah Fay Goldstein, Peter Dreimanis, Luke Lalonde, Norah Sadava, Colin Burgess		
Mile End Kicks	Chandler Levack	Barbie Ferreira, Devon Bostick, Stanley Simons, Juliette Gariépy, Jay Baruchel		
Modern Whore	Nicole Bazuin	Andrea Werhun		
Montreal, My Beautiful (Montréal, ma belle)	Xiaodan He	Joan Chen, Charlotte Aubin		
Morgenkreis	Basma al-Sharif			
Mortician	Abdolreza Kahani	Nima Sadr, Rahim Bahrami, Golazin Ardestani		
The Music Box	Jay Dahl			
My Friend the Green Horse	Alanis Obomsawin			
My Memory-Walls (Mes murs-mémoires)	Axel Robin	Rose Lévesque		
My Son Came Back to Disappear (Mon fils ne revint que sept jours)	Yan Giroux	Marie-France Marcotte, Francis Lahaye		
My Stepmother Is a Witch (Ma belle-mère est une sorcière)	Joëlle Desjardins Paquette	Juliette Aubé, Marilyn Castonguay, Pierre-Yves Cardinal, Marc-André Leclair		
Nechako: It Will Be a Big River Again	Lyana Patrick			
The Nest	Chase Joynt, Julietta Singh			
Nesting (Peau à peau)	Chloé Cinq-Mars	Rose-Marie Perreault		
Ni-Naadamaadiz: Red Power Rising	Shane Belcourt			
Niimi	Dana Solomon			
Nika and Madison	Eva Thomas	Ellyn Jade, Star Slade, Amanda Brugel, Gail Maurice, Jennifer Podemski, Shawn Doyle		
Nirvanna the Band the Show the Movie	Matt Johnson	Matt Johnson, Jay McCarrol		
Nobel and the Kid	James Anthony Usas			
Northbound	William Scoular	Bruce Dern		
Old Guys in Bed	Jean-Pierre Bergeron	Paul James Saunders, Duff MacDonald, Joan Hart, Vlasta Vrana		
Old Tomorrow	Kane Stewart			
Once Upon My Mother (Ma mère, Dieu et Sylvie Vartan)	Ken Scott	Jonathan Cohen, Leïla Bekhti, Sylvie Vartan	Canada-France coproduction	
Out Standing	Mélanie Charbonneau	Nina Kiri, Vincent Leclerc, Antoine Pilon		
The Painted Life of E.J. Hughes	Jenn Strom			
Parade: Queer Acts of Love and Resistance	Noam Gonick			
Paul	Denis Côté			
Paulie	Aaron Martini			
Peak Everything (Amour Apocalypse)	Anne Émond	Patrick Hivon, Piper Perabo		
Pédalo	Stéphane E. Roy	Marc Fournier, Stéphane E. Roy, Catherine Proulx-Lemay, Camille Felton, Marilyn Bastien		
La Pensée-Machine	Olivier D. Asselin			
Petite Rose	Geneviève Dulude-De Celles	Sofia Stanina, Ekaterina Stanina, Christian Bégin, Galin Stoev		
Pidikwe (Rumble)	Caroline Monnet	Joséphine Bacon		
Pink Light	Harrison Browne			
The Pitch	Michèle Hozer			
A Place Where I Belong	Rheanna Toy			
Platanero	Juan Frank Hernandez	Irdens Exantus, Stanley Exantus		
The Players	Sarah Galea-Davis	Stefani Kimber, Eric Johnson, Jess Salgueiro, Joe Cobden, Ennis Esmer		
Pool Sharks	Austin Lindsay			
Poster Boy	India Opzoomer			
Pride & Prayer	Panta Mosleh			
Pulse of the Continent	Eric González	Jonathan Morris, Adam Meeks, Krys Bialorucki, James Clements, Keith Creel, Oscar del Cueto Cuevas		
The Punk of Natashquan (Le Punk de Natashquan)	Nicolas Lachapelle	Ghislain Viger		
Racewalkers	Kevin Claydon, Phil Moniz	Kevin Claydon, Phil Moniz, Robbie Amell, Greg Bryk, Jess Salgueiro		
Ramón Who Speaks to Ghosts	Shervin Kermani			
Replacer	Randall Okita			
Révolté	Noël Mitrani	Camile Foley, Elliott Mitrani, Mélanie Elliott, Émilie Massé, Natacha Mitrani, Veronika Leclerc Strickland, Pierre-Luc Brillant		
Ripe (chín)	Solara Thanh Bình Đặng			
Rising Through the Fray	Courtney Montour			
R.L. Stine's Pumpkinhead	Jem Garrard	Bean Reid, Adeline Lo, Kevin McNulty, Bob Frazer, Matty Finochio, Seth Isaac Johnson, Kendra Anderson		
Run Terry Run	Sean Menard	Terry Fox		
S.A.D.	Vanessa Sandre			
Saints and Warriors	Patrick Shannon			
Sea Star	Tyler McKenzie Evans	John Phillips		
Serenity	Frank Tremblay			
Shifting Baselines	Julien Élie			
Shamed	Matt Gallagher			
Shrimp Fried Rice	Dylan Pun			
Siksikakowan: The Blackfoot Man	Sinakson Trevor Solway			
Silver Screamers	Sean Cisterna			
Singhs in the Ring	Akash Sherman	Gama Singh, Raj Singh, Bret Hart, Chelsea Green, Yuvraj Singh Dhesi, Lance Storm		
#skoden	Damien Eagle Bear			
A Snowman's Dream	Gus Belford, Steve Belford			
A Soft Touch	Heather Young			
Solitudes	Ryan McKenna			
Son of Sara	Houston Bone	Chloe Van Landschoot, Tymika Tafari, Garrett Hnatiuk		
Sosuke the Duck	Bekky O'Neil			
Sounds of Glass	Morgan Abele			
Space Cadet	Eric San			
Spare My Bones, Coyote!	Jonah Malak			
Starwalker	Corey Payette	Dillan Chiblow, Jeffrey Michael Follis, Stewart Adam McKensy, Jason Sakaki, Jennifer Lines		
Steal Away	Clement Virgo	Angourie Rice, Mallori Johnson, Lauren Lee Smith, Idrissa Sanogo Bamba		
Stereo Girls	Caroline Deruas Peano		Canada-France coproduction	
Still Alive in Kingston	Jay Middaugh			
Still Single	Jamal Burger, Jukan Tateisi	Masaki Saito		
The Stolen Child	Sebastian McKinnon			
Sweet Summer Pow Wow	Darrell Dennis	Joshua Odjick, Tatyana Rose Baptiste, Graham Greene		
Sweetness	Emma Higgins	Kate Hallett, Herman Tømmeraas, Justin Chatwin, Steven Ogg, Amanda Brugel		
Thanks to the Hard Work of the Elephants	Bryce Hodgson	Hunter Dillon, Kevin Nguyen, Tony Nappo, Elizabeth Saunders, Ryan McDonald		
The Boy Who Vanished	Christie Will Wolf	Tegan Moss, Aiden Howard, Jesse Moss, Matthew Kevin Anderson, Gord Pankhurst, Kingston Goodjohn		
There Are No Words	Min Sook Lee			
They Are Sacred (Ils sont sacrés)	Kim O'Bomsawin			
The Things You Kill	Alireza Khatami	Ekin Koç, Erkan Kolçak Köstendil, Hazar Ergüçlü, Ercan Kesal	Turkey, France, Poland, Canada coproduction	
A Thousand Colours (Recomposée)	Nadia Louis-Desmarchais			
Tie Man	Rémi Fréchette			
Le Tour de Canada	John Hollands			
The Track	Ryan Sidhoo			
Tracy & Martina: Goin' Out West	Brendan Langelle Lyle	Justine Williamson, Greg Vardy		
The Train (Le Train)	Marie Brassard	Thalie Rhainds, Electra Codina Morelli, Larissa Corriveau, Lenni-Kim		
Treasure of the Rice Terraces	Kent Donguines	Whang-od		
A Tribe Called Love	Mohamed Ahmed	Dalmar Abuzeid, Feaven Abera, Omar Abdi		
True North	Michèle Stephenson			
Tuktuit: Caribou	Lindsay Aksarniq McIntyre			
Turn It Up!	Samuel Scott			
Two Cuckolds Go Swimming	Winston DeGiobbi	Deragh Campbell, Stephen Melanson		
Two Women (Deux femmes en or)	Chloé Robichaud	Karine Gonthier-Hyndman, Laurence Leboeuf, Félix Moati, Mani Soleymanlou, Sophie Nélisse, Juliette Gariépy	Remake of 1970s film Two Women in Gold	
Uh... I'm Sorry, Please Forgive Me (Désolé, pardon, je m’excuse)	Estévan Morin			
The Undertone	Ian Tuason	Nina Kiri, Kris Holden-Ried, Michèle Duquet, Keana Lyn Bastidas		
Unlabelled	Colette Johnson-Vosberg			
#Vanlife	Trevor Cameron	Michelle Thrush, Justin Derickson, Dakota Ray Hebert, Tahmoh Penikett, Joel Montgrand		
Veins (Nervures)	Raymond St-Jean	Marie-Thérèse Fortin, Romane Denis, Richard Fréchette, Sylvain Marcel		
Vermillion	Amy Trefry	Lyndie Greenwood, Amy Trefry, Katarina Bakolias		
A View from Home	Mingzhe Zhou			
Violence	Connor Marsden	Rohan Campbell, Maddie Hasson, Greg Bryk, Sarah Grey		
Waiting for the Storms (Le Temps)	François Delisle			
We Will Not Be Silenced	Catherine Hébert, Elric Robichon			
We'll Find Happiness (On sera heureux)	Léa Pool	Mehdi Meskar, Alexandre Landry, Aron Archer, Céline Bonnier, Sascha Ley, Jérôme Varanfrain, Joël Delsaut		
Welcome	Jevon Boreland	Emmanuel Kabongo, Shailene Garnett, Brianna Goldie		
A Welcome Distraction	Brian Daniel Johnson			
The Well	Hubert Davis	Shailyn Pierre-Dixon, Joanne Boland, Arnold Pinnock, Sheila McCarthy		
What We Dreamed of Then	Taylor Olson	Hugh Thompson, Parveen Kaur		
What We Leave Behind (Ce qu'on laisse derrière)	Alexandra Myotte, Jean-Sébastien Hamel			
Where Souls Go (Où vont les âmes?)	Brigitte Poupart	Sara Montpetit, Micheline Lanctôt, Monia Chokri, Julianne Côté		
While the Green Grass Grows: A Diary in Seven Parts	Peter Mettler			
Who Killed the Montreal Expos? (Qui a tué les Expos de Montréal?)	Jean-François Poisson			
Wrong Husband (Uiksaringitara)	Zacharias Kunuk	Theresia Kappianaq, Haiden Angutimarik, Leah Panimera, Mark Taqqaugaq, Emma Quassa		
Year of the Dragon	Giran Findlay Liu	Fiona Fu		
Youngblood	Hubert Davis	Ashton James, Blair Underwood, Oluniké Adeliyi, Henri Richer-Picard		
Yunan	Ameer Fakher Eldin	Georges Khabbaz, Sibel Kekilli, Ali Suliman, Hanna Schygulla, Tom Wlaschiha	Multinational coproduction	

== See also ==
- 2025 in Canadian television
- 2025 in film
- List of Canadian films of 2024
