= 2025 Atlantic International Film Festival =

Canadian film festival

- Opening film: At the Place of Ghosts (Sk+te’kmujue’katik) by Bretten Hannam
- Closing film: Kiss of the Spider Woman by Bill Condon
- Location: Halifax, Nova Scotia, Canada
- Founded: 1980
- Festival date: September 10–17, 2025
- Website: atlanticfilmfestival.ca

Atlantic International Film Festival
- 2026 2024

The 2025 edition of the Atlantic International Film Festival, the 45th edition in the event's history, took place from September 10 to 17, 2025 in Halifax, Nova Scotia, Canada.

The first films in the program were announced on July 25, with the full program announced on August 13.

The festival opened with Bretten Hannam's film At the Place of Ghosts (Sk+te’kmujue’katik) and closed with Bill Condon's Kiss of the Spider Woman, with Andy Hines's Little Lorraine serving as the centrepiece Atlantic Gala.

== Awards ==
Award winners were announced on September 14.

Award	Film	Recipient
Gordon Parsons Award for Best Atlantic Canadian Feature	At the Place of Ghosts (Sk+te’kmujue’katik)	Bretten Hannam
Best Atlantic Canadian Director	Blueberry Grunt	Sherry White
Joan Orenstein & David Renton Award for Outstanding Performance in Acting	Little Lorraine	Stephen McHattie
Joan Orenstein & David Renton Award for Outstanding Performance in Acting	Dancing on the Elephant	Mary Walsh
Best Atlantic Short Film	Feed	Nancy Urich
Best Atlantic Short Film, Honorable Mention	Mourning Rituals	Annaka Gale
Best Atlantic Short Documentary	The Muse	Wanda Nolan
Best Atlantic Short Documentary, Honorable Mention	Imprint	Duncan Major
Michael Weir Award for Best Atlantic Screenwriting	Little Lorraine	Andy Hines, Adam Baldwin
Best Atlantic Cinematographer	At the Place of Ghosts (Sk+te’kmujue’katik)	Guy Godfree
Best Atlantic Editor	Dancing on the Elephant	Angela Baker
Best Atlantic Original Score	At the Place of Ghosts (Sk+te’kmujue’katik)	Jeremy Dutcher

== Official selections ==
=== Gala Presentations ===
English title	Original title	Director(s)	Production country
At the Place of Ghosts	Sk+te’kmujue’katik	Bretten Hannam	Canada
Kiss of the Spider Woman		Bill Condon	United States
Little Lorraine		Andy Hines	Canada

=== Reel East Coast Shorts ===
English title	Original title	Director(s)	Province
Louis		Akshay Shirke	Canada
The Muse		Wanda Nolan	Canada
A Place to Wait and Watch		Vaida Nairn	Canada
A Soft Touch		Heather Young	Canada
talking to humans about the end of the world		Millefiore Clarkes	Canada
Wolverine and Little Thunder: An Eel Hunting Adventure		Alan Syliboy	Canada

=== World Cinema ===
English title	Original title	Director(s)	Production country
The Blue Trail	O Último Azul	Gabriel Mascaro	Brazil, Mexico, Chile, Netherlands
Blueberry Grunt		Sherry White	Canada
Dancing on the Elephant		Julia Neill, Jacob Z. Smith	Canada
Dreams (Sex Love)	Drømmer	Dag Johan Haugerud	Norway
Hangashore		Justin Oakey	Canada
The History of Sound		Oliver Hermanus	United Kingdom, United States
It Was Just an Accident	یک تصادف ساده	Jafar Panahi	Iran, France, Luxembourg
The Love That Remains	Ástin Sem Eftir Er	Hlynur Pálmason	Iceland, Denmark, Sweden, France
Lovely Day	Mille secrets mille dangers	Philippe Falardeau	Canada
The Mastermind		Kelly Reichardt	United States
Mile End Kicks		Chandler Levack	Canada
My Son Came Back to Disappear	Mon fils ne revint que sept jours	Yan Giroux	Canada
Nirvanna the Band the Show the Movie		Matt Johnson	Canada
Nouvelle Vague		Richard Linklater	France
Peak Everything	Amour Apocalypse	Anne Émond	Canada
A Poet	Un poeta	Simón Mesa Soto	Colombia
A Private Life	Vie Privée	Rebecca Zlotowski	France
Raptures	Rörelser	Jon Blåhed	Sweden, Finland
Sentimental Value	Affeksjonsverdi	Joachim Trier	Norway, France, Denmark, Germany, Sweden, United Kingdom
Sound of Falling	In Die Sonne Schauen	Mascha Schilinski	Germany
Steal Away		Clement Virgo	Canada, Belgium
The Things You Kill		Alireza Khatami	Turkey, Poland, France, Canada
What We Dreamed of Then		Taylor Olson	Canada
Wrong Husband	Uiksaringitara	Zacharias Kunuk	Canada

=== Narrative New Waves ===
English title	Original title	Director(s)	Production country
Blue Heron		Sophy Romvari	Canada
DJ Ahmet		Georgi M. Unkovski	North Macedonia, Czech Republic, Serbia, Croatia
Follies	Folichonneries	Eric K. Boulianne	Canada
For Worse		Amy Landecker	United States
Lucky Lu		Lloyd Lee Choi	Canada, United States
Mad Bills to Pay (or Destiny, dile que no soy malo)		Joel Alfonso Vargas	United States
My Father's Shadow		Akinola Davies Jr.	United Kingdom, Ireland, Nigeria
Pinch		Uttera Singh	India
Sleepless City	Ciudad sin sueño	Guillermo Galoe	Spain, France
A Useful Ghost	ผีใช้ได้ค่ะ	Ratchapoom Boonbunchachoke	Thailand, France, Singapore, Germany
Vermilion		Amy Trefry	Canada

=== Late Night Visions ===
English title	Original title	Director(s)	Production country
Honey Bunch		Madeleine Sims-Fewer, Dusty Mancinelli	Canada
If I Had Legs I'd Kick You		Mary Bronstein	United States
Portal to Hell		Woody Bess	United States

=== In Focus ===
English title	Original title	Director(s)	Production country
Anne of Green Gables		Kevin Sullivan	Canada
Closet Monster		Stephen Dunn	Canada
Parsley Days		Andrea Dorfman	Canada
Shadow Men	Nos hommes dans l'ouest	Renée Blanchar	Canada

=== Documentaries ===
English title	Original title	Director(s)	Production country
Agatha's Almanac		Amalie Atkins	Canada
Another Light on the Road: Robert Frank and June Leaf's Canadian Home		Katherine Whalen, John Parlante	Canada, United States
The Dating Game		Violet Du Feng	United States, United Kingdom, Norway
The Eyes of Ghana		Ben Proudfoot	United States
Folktales		Heidi Ewing, Rachel Grady	United States, Norway
Ghosts of the Sea	Les enfants du large	Virginia Tangvald	Canada, France
John Candy: I Like Me		Colin Hanks	United States
Life After		Reid Davenport	United States
Lilith Fair: Building a Mystery		Ally Pankiw	Canada
Niñxs		Kani Lapuerta	Mexico, Germany
The Pitch		Michèle Hozer	Canada
Shari & Lamb Chop		Lisa D'Apolito	United States
Videoheaven		Alex Ross Perry	United States
Yanuni		Richard Ladkani	Germany, Brazil, Canada, United States, Australia

=== Shorts ===
English title	Original title	Director(s)	Production country
And, Scene		Brianna Russell	Canada
Anita Louise and the Wild Women		Arena Alamino	Canada
Astro		Tim Ewalts	Netherlands
A Bear Remembers		Linden Zhang, Hannah Knight	United Kingdom
Beneath Which Rivers Flow		Ali Yahya	Iraq
Bread Will Walk		Alex Boya	Canada
Brenda and Baxter		Leah Johnston	Canada
Debaters		Alex Heller	United States
Dike Bar		Amy Siegel	Canada
Disco Fever		Kevin Hartford	Canada
Dish Pit		Anna Hopkins	Canada
Eel		Wayne Burns	Canada
Elvira		Sarah Segal-Lazar	Canada
Feed		Nancy Urich	Canada
(for once I dreamed of you)		Kate Solar	Canada
Hypersensitive	Hypersensible	Martine Frossard	Canada
Imprint		Duncan Major	Canada
The Loon	Le Huard	Paula Bourgie	Canada
La Mayordomía		Martin Edralin	Canada
More Than Happy		Wei Keong Tan	Singapore
Mourning Rituals		Annaka Gale	Canada
No Matter the Weather	Beau temps, mauvais temps	Florence Lafond	Canada
Oh Yeah!		Nick Canfield	United States, United Kingdom, Switzerland
Oliver		Andrew Strickland	Canada
An Ongoing List of Things Found in the Library Book Drop, Usually Being Used as Bookmarks		Kayla Abuda Galang	United States
Orbits	Orbites	Sarah Seené	Canada
Ordinary Life	Futsu no seikatsu	Yoriko Mizushiri	France, Japan
Paradaïz		Matea Radic	Canada
Pidikwe (Rumble)		Caroline Monnet	Canada
Power		Jordan Canning	Canada
Promise in the Ground		Ally Bowes, Ariel Mackenzie, Linus Mulherin	Canada
Ramón Who Speaks to Ghosts		Shervin Kermani	Canada
RAT+CAMMIE=FOREVER		Marissa Sean Cruz	Canada
Retirement Plan		John Kelly	Ireland
Scars We Love	Les Belles cicatrices	Raphaël Jouzeau	France
She Raised Me		Ben Lewis	Canada
The Spin Disturber	L'Empêcheuse de tourner en rond	Hélène Lebon	Canada
Susana		Amandine Thomas, Gerardo Coello Escalante	Mexico, United States
Sweetie		Taylor Olson	Canada
Le Tour du Canada		John Hollands	Canada
Year of the Dragon		Giran Findlay Liu	Canada
Zari		Shruti Parekh	United States, India
