= Little Lorraine =

Community in Nova Scotia, Canada

Coordinates: 45.957°N 59.867°W

Location of Little Lorraine in Nova Scotia

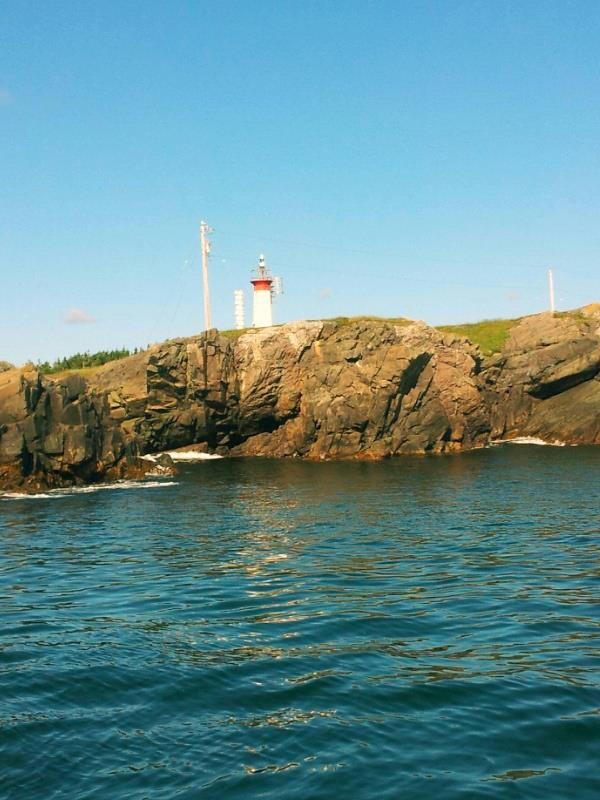
Little Lorraine lighthouse

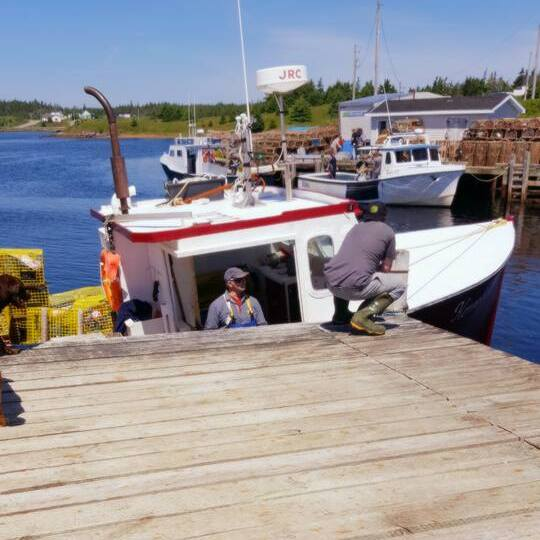
wharf in Little Lorraine beach

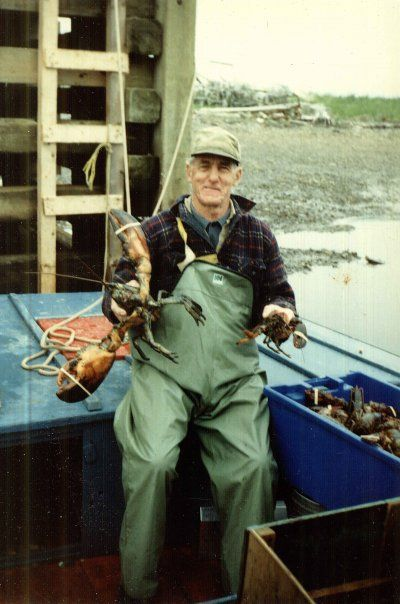
Lobster fisherman at Little Lorraine wharf

Little Lorraine is a small community located on the east coast of Cape Breton, Nova Scotia, Canada.

It is known to have had several different names in the past such as Little Loran, Lorembec, Cap-de-Lorembec, Petit Laurenbec and between 1750-51 Petit Lorembec was in use. In a 1756 census, there were 22 families living in Little Lorraine – all in the fishery business. It was founded in 1714 and has a population of approximately 62 people. It is 8.9 km from the small community of Louisbourg.

The small village is known for its rough seas and heavy fog. The Irish immigrant sailing ship Astraea ran aground at night May 8, 1834, in Lorraine Head.

Commanded and owned by Captain William Ridley, on a voyage from Limerick, Ireland to Quebec it quickly broke up, killing 251 people. The shores were scattered with nude corpses. Some were buried in an unmarked unknown mass burial near the wreck site. There were only three survivors — a surgeon, a carpenter and a seaman. The ship was British in nationality, built in 1812. There lies a plaque on the ocean floor in memory of the people who died aboard the ship. A monument stands in place on Little Lorraine road on a grassy hill between two brooks.

Settlement began in the early 1700s by French Acadians, fishermen from France (Brittany and Normandy). In 1734, nineteen heads of households, thirteen of whom were from The Gulf of St. Malo, France. In 1752 there were men and families who also came from Bayeux, France. They were all in the fishing industry. There was an Acadian family who settled in Little Lorraine at around 1733, the Yvons. The British came to Little Lorraine and deported him and his family in 1758, three years after the expulsion of the Acadians from Acadie/Nova Scotia by the British. In 1745, twenty Englishmen were surrounded in Little Lorraine by 40–50 Indians accompanied by three Frenchmen. Most were shot down, some surrendered to live another day, some were tortured. They came and forced them out, they were deported on ships, and their houses were burned down. In the early to mid-1800s Irish immigrants came to settle in Little Lorraine.

The village is mostly Roman Catholic. Ste-Claire Catholic Church was built in 1726 in Little Lorraine. The church is no longer standing as it has burnt down. Original records of the church are located in the Archives Nationales (National Archives Overseas) located in Aix-en-Provence, France.

It is home to the popular walking trails Gooseberry Cove and Wild Cove.

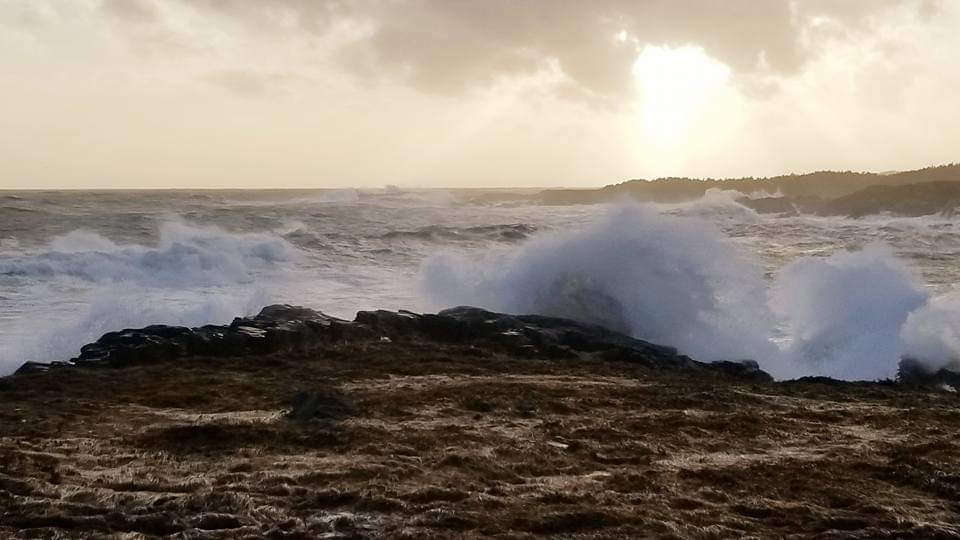
Gooseberry Cove

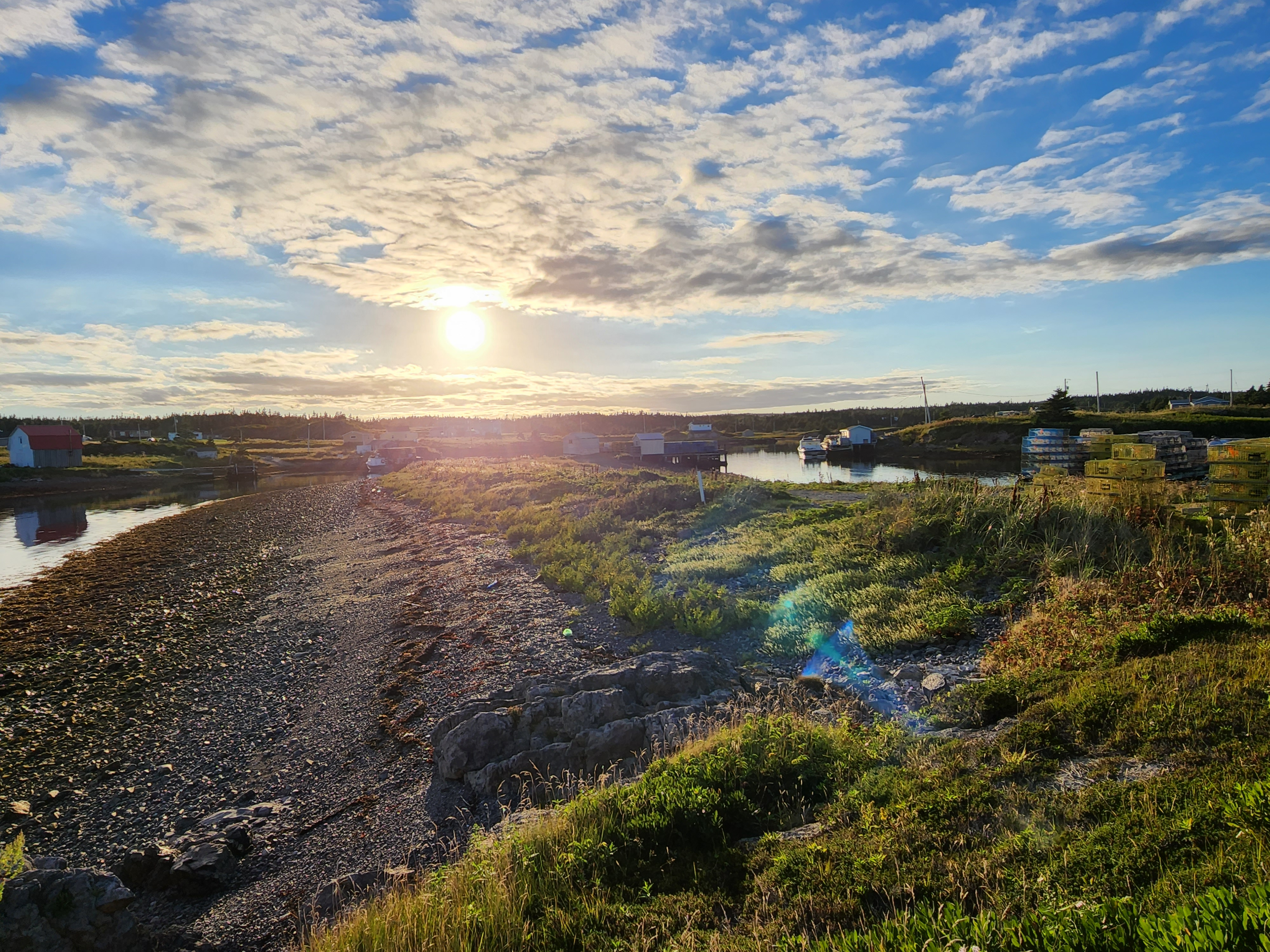
Little Lorraine fishing village beach

== In popular culture ==
The town was impacted by the involvement of several of its residents in a cocaine smuggling ring in the 1980s and early 1990s. This was the subject of "Lighthouse in Little Lorraine", a 2022 single by Nova Scotia singer-songwriter Adam Baldwin, and Little Lorraine, a 2025 film by director Andy Hines.

== Images ==
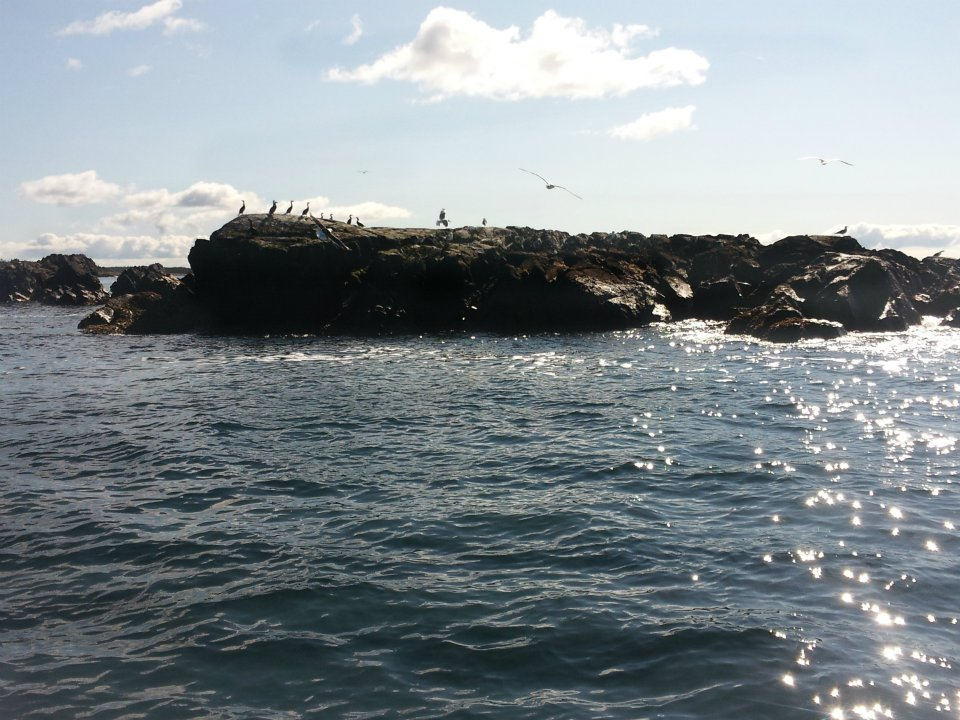
Little Lorraine harbour, Gull Rock

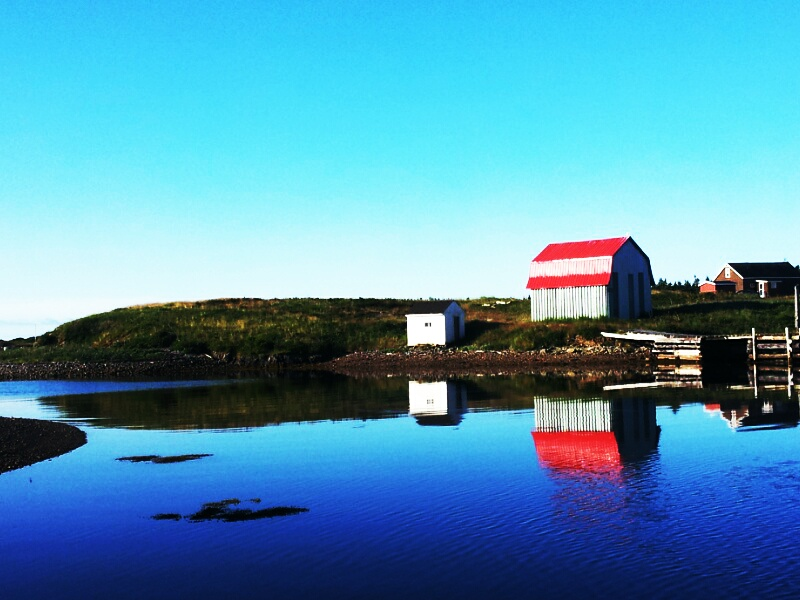
Little Lorraine harbour

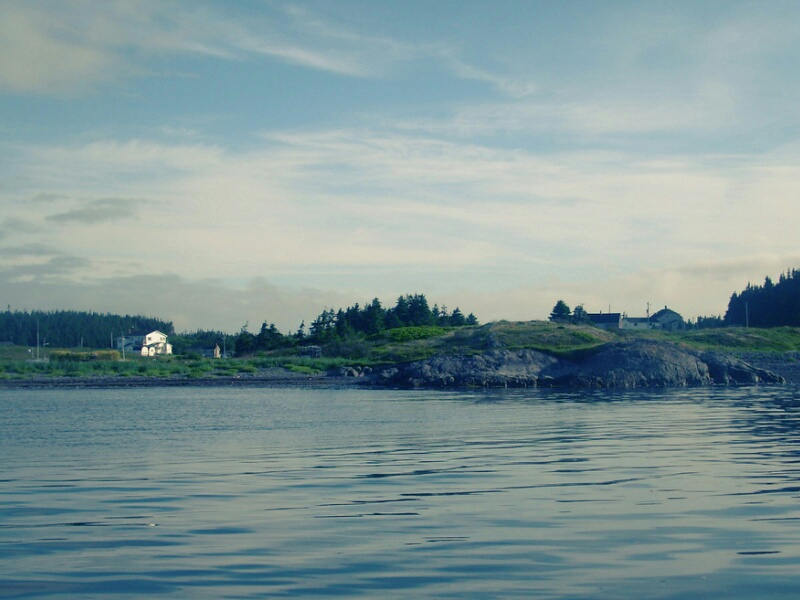
Entering Little Lorraine harbour

== See also ==
- List of communities in the Cape Breton Regional Municipality - Populations
