= Guy Godfree =

Canadian cinematographer

- Born: Pugwash, Nova Scotia
- Occupation: Cinematographer

Guy Godfree is a Canadian cinematographer. He is most noted for his work on the films Maudie, for which he won the 2017 Canadian Society of Cinematographers award for feature film cinematography, and At the Place of Ghosts (Sk+te’kmujue’katik), for which he won the Best Atlantic Cinematography award at the 2025 Atlantic International Film Festival.

Originally from Pugwash, Nova Scotia, he is a graduate of the American Film Institute Conservatory.

His other credits have included Wet Bum, Frost, Natasha, Suck It Up, Giant Little Ones, The Parting Glass, Buffaloed, Plus One, Let Him Go, Wildhood and Sharp Corner.
