= Sugar Coated =

- Film poster
- Directed by: Michèle Hozer
- Written by: Roxana Spicer
- Produced by: Janice Dawe
- Edited by: Michèle Hozer
- Music by: Russell Walker
- Production company: The Cutting Factory
- Distributed by: TVOntario
- Release date: April 25, 2015 (Hot Docs)
- Running time: 91 minutes
- Country: Canada
- Language: English

Sugar Coated is a Canadian documentary film, directed by Michèle Hozer and released in 2015. The film explores the impact on human health of the heavy use of sugar in the contemporary diet.

The film premiered at the Hot Docs Canadian International Documentary Festival in 2015, and was screened at the DOXA Documentary Film Festival before screening on TVOntario and at selected other documentary film festivals.

The film won the Donald Brittain Award for Best Social/Political Documentary Program at the 4th Canadian Screen Awards in 2016.
