= Bibi's Dog Is Dead =

2024 Canadian short film directed by Shervin Kermani

- Directed by: Shervin Kermani
- Written by: Shervin Kermani; Bryn McAuley
- Produced by: Shervin Kermani; Bryn McAuley; Angela Silcock
- Starring: Bryn McAuley; Mishka Thébaud
- Cinematography: Shervin Kermani
- Edited by: Shervin Kermani
- Music by: Shervin Kermani
- Release date: March 18, 2024 (CFF)
- Running time: 12 minutes
- Country: Canada
- Language: English

Bibi's Dog Is Dead is a Canadian short comedy film, written and directed by Shervin Kermani and released in 2024. It stars Bryn McAuley as Bibi, a woman struggling with whether or not to call her ex-boyfriend Adam (Mishka Thébaud) after her dog dies.

The film premiered at the 2024 Canadian Film Festival, and had its international premiere at the Palm Springs International Festival of Short Films.

The film received a Canadian Screen Award nomination for Best Live Action Short Drama, and McAuley won the award for Best Performance in a Live Action Short Drama, at the 13th Canadian Screen Awards in 2025.
