= Steve Lund =

Canadian actor (born 1989)

- Born: January 9, 1989 (age 37); Halifax, Nova Scotia, Canada
- Occupation: Actor
- Years active: 2011–present

Steve Lund (born January 9, 1989) is a Canadian actor, best known for playing the roles of Nick Sorrentino in Bitten (2014–2016) and Jake in Schitt's Creek (2016–2020).

Before acting, he played in the Quebec Major Junior Hockey League, for the P.E.I. Rocket (now the Charlottetown Islanders) and the Halifax Mooseheads, before being forced to end his hockey career in 2008 after a series of concussions. Within months of leaving that career, he began taking acting classes in Vancouver and found a new one.

He has appeared in several Hallmark Channel films, television shows such as Haven, Reign and a leading role in the reboot of Street Legal.

== Filmography ==
=== Film ===
Year	Title	Role	Notes
2017	Clusterf*ck	Paul	
2019	The Banana Splits Movie	Mitch	
2021	Wildhood	Dale	
2021	Single All the Way	Tim	
2023	Who's Yer Father?	Glenn Misener	
2025	Little Lorraine	Jake	

=== Television ===
Year	Title	Role	Notes
2011	Yukonic!	Stewart	Main role (season 1)
2011	Alphas	David Burton	Episode: "Never Let Me Go"
2011	Being Erica	Alan	Episode: "Being Mama"
2011	Lost Girl	Rockstar	Episode: "It's Better to Burn Out Than Fae Away"
2011	Blue Mountain State	Ty Wilson	2 episodes
2012	Nikita	Marine Guard	Episode: "Homecoming"
2012	Suits	Attractive Guy	Episode: "Meet the New Boss"
2012, 2015	Haven	Colorado Kid/James Cogan	5 episodes
2013	Hemlock Grove	Bartender	2 episodes
2013	Beauty and the Beast	Dr. Kirk Iverson	Episode: "Playing with Fire
2013	Defiance	Ziggy	Episode: "The Serpent's Egg"
2014	Best Christmas Party Ever	Nick Forbes	Television film
2014–2016	Bitten	Nick Sorrentino	Main role
2015	Christmas Incorporated	William Young	Television film
2016	Crossfire	Jimmy Cooper	Television film
2016–2020	Schitt's Creek	Jake	5 episodes
2017	Reign	Lord Luc Narcisse	8 episodes
2017	Good Witch	Kevin	Episode: "Without Magic for a Spell"
2017	The Art of Us	Tom Becker	Television film
2017	The Christmas Cottage	Ean Callaghan	Television film
2017–2018	Frankie Drake Mysteries	Ernest Hemingway	3 episodes
2018	Secret Millionaire	Sean Payton	Television film
2018	Private Eyes	Miles Mallone	Episode: "Brew the Right Thing"
2019	Street Legal	Adam Darling	Main role
2019	Escaping the NXIVM Cult: A Mother's Fight to Save Her Daughter	Casper Van Dien	Television film
2020	Unlocking Christmas	Kevin Matthews	Television film
2021	Baby, It's Cold Inside	Ben	Hallmark Movie
2021	Love Upstream	Rob Wilson	Hallmark Movie
2021	Debbie Macomber's A Mrs. Miracle Christmas	Will McCullough	Hallmark Movie
2021	Faith Heist	Baxter	Television film
2022	Six Degrees of Santa	Jason Sparks	Television film
2022	Christmas Bedtime Stories	Pierce	Television film
2022	Hudson and Rex	Jack Hudson	Episode: "Punch Drunk Love"
2023–2024	Roll With It	Juan	Television series
2024	Everybody's Meg	Josh	Television series
2024	Mistletoe Murders	Marcus Donovan	2 episodes
2025	Hearts Around The Table: Jenna's First Love	Andrew	Hallmark Movie
