= Genius Within: The Inner Life of Glenn Gould =

- Directed by: Peter Raymont; Michèle Hozer
- Produced by: Peter Raymont; Michèle Hozer
- Starring: Cornelia Foss; Glenn Gould
- Cinematography: Walter Corbett
- Edited by: Michèle Hozer
- Production company: White Pine Pictures
- Distributed by: Lorber Films
- Release date: September 13, 2009 (TIFF)
- Running time: 108 minutes
- Country: Canada
- Language: English

Genius Within: The Inner Life of Glenn Gould is a Canadian documentary film, directed by Peter Raymont and Michèle Hozer and released in 2009. The film is a portrait of Canadian classical pianist Glenn Gould, centred in part on his romantic relationship with artist Cornelia Foss.

== Distribution ==
The film premiered at the 2009 Toronto International Film Festival, and was screened at the 2009 Vancouver International Film Festival, before going into commercial release in December 2009.

In 2010 the film was broadcast on Bravo in Canada as a standalone documentary special, and on PBS in the United States as an episode of American Masters.

== Reception ==
On review aggregator website Rotten Tomatoes, the film holds an approval rating of 85 per cent based on 39 reviews. At Metacritic, the film has a weighted average score of 72 out of 100, based on 9 critics, indicating "generally favorable reviews".

Liam Lacey of The Globe and Mail wrote that "though the film serves as a competent introduction to Gould, it is unlikely to reveal much to anyone familiar with his reputation. There's little insight into what exactly distinguished him from other pianists: his technical clarity, his habit of altering tempo, his concept of "ecstasy." In short, everything that made him exceptional is barely touched on. At best, the film offers Gould as a charismatic figure - attractive, humorous, well-spoken and iconoclastic - and the highlights are archival footage of him as a young trailblazer, arriving at Columbia Records in New York, where he soon became a sensation."

Michael O'Sullivan of The Washington Post wrote that "Gould remains something of a riddle wrapped in an enigma. But it's the questions that hang in the air, and not the biographical details that the film lays out, that make it so hard to take your eyes -- and your ears -- off him".

A.O. Scott of The New York Times said that "A tour de force of archival research and dogged interviewing, and the portrait it presents is remarkably complete".

== Awards ==
Award	Date of ceremony	Category	Recipient	Result	Ref.
Canadian Cinema Editors	2011	Best Editing in a Feature Documentary	Michèle Hozer	Nominated	
Cinema Audio Society Awards	2010	Outstanding Achievement in Sound Mixing for Television Non Fiction, Variety or Music – Series or Specials	Bruce Cameron, Ian Rodness	Nominated	
Directors Guild of Canada	2010	DGC Allan King Award for Best Documentary Film	Peter Raymont, Michèle Hozer	Nominated	
Gemini Awards	2010	Best Biography Documentary Program	Peter Raymont	Won	
International Documentary Association	2010	Best Music Documentary	Peter Raymont, Michèle Hozer	Nominated	

The film also made the initial Academy Award shortlist for Best Documentary Feature Film prior to the 84th Academy Awards in 2011, but was not one of the final nominees.
