= Loaded Gun (album) =

Studio album by Gloryhound
- Released: 23 June 2014
- Recorded: November–December 2013 at The Farm Studios Vancouver, British Columbia, Canada
- Genre: Hard rock
- Length: 42:00
- Label: eOne
- Producer: Garth Richardson

Loaded Gun is the debut album from Canadian rock band Gloryhound. It was released in June 2014. The album was recorded in 2013 at The Farm Studios in Vancouver, British Columbia and was produced and recorded by Garth Richardson and mixed by Bob Ezrin.

== Track listing ==
No.	Title	Length
1.	"One in a Million"	3:01
2.	"Loaded Gun"	4:12
3.	"I Need Ya"	3:04
4.	"I Can Change"	3:19
5.	"Let You Down Again"	3:35
6.	"Camera Kids"	4:08
7.	"Suzie Is a Man"	3:52
8.	"Set It on Fire"	3:59
9.	"Strong One"	4:23
10.	"Sarah Ann"	4:25
11.	"In the End"	3:45
Total length:		42:43

== Personnel ==
- Evan Meisner – vocals, rhythm guitar, piano
- David Casey – lead guitar, vocals
- Shaun Hanlon – drums, percussion
- Jeremy MacPherson – bass guitar
- Garth Richardson – production,
- Bob Ezrin – audio mixing at Anarchy Studios Nashville, Tennessee
- Ben Kaplan – Recording and digital editing, keyboards
- Josh Guillaume – Assistant recorder, mixing engineer
- Griffin Bargholz – Assistant recorder
- Flavio Cirillo – Drum tech
- Jarod Snowdon – Mixing engineer
- Justin Cortelyou – Mixing engineer
- Brock McFarlane – Mastering at CPS Mastering
- Alex MacAskill – Artwork and layout
- Dirty Harry – Photography
- Leigh Righton – Photography
- Nathan Quinn – A&R

== Singles ==
Year	Song	Chart Peak	Album
2014	"Loaded Gun"	#25 Can Active	Loaded Gun
