= Frost (2012 film) =

2012 Canadian short film

- Film poster
- Directed by: Jeremy Ball
- Written by: Jeremy Ball
- Produced by: Lauren Grant
- Starring: Emily Piggford; Oscar Hsu; Lara Daans
- Cinematography: Guy Godfree
- Edited by: Richard Mandin
- Music by: Andrew Lockington
- Production company: Canadian Film Centre
- Release date: September 11, 2012 (TIFF)
- Running time: 13 minutes
- Country: Canada
- Language: English

Frost is a Canadian short drama film, directed by Jeremy Ball and released in 2012. The film stars Emily Piggford as Naya, a young Inuk girl in the Canadian Arctic who makes a perilous discovery while hunting.

Made while Ball was a student at the Canadian Film Centre, the film was shot entirely on a soundstage, with chroma key editing and special effects processing used to create the landscape. The film premiered at the 2012 Toronto International Film Festival.

The film was a Canadian Screen Award nominee for Best Live Action Short Drama at the 1st Canadian Screen Awards.
