= Hole (film) =

- Film poster
- Directed by: Martin Edralin
- Written by: Martin Edralin
- Produced by: Martin Edralin; Laura Perlmutter; Andrew Nicholas McCann Smith
- Starring: Ken Harrower; Sebastian Deery; April Lee
- Cinematography: Daniel Grant
- Edited by: Bryan Atkinson
- Production companies: Circus Zero; First Love Films
- Release date: August 14, 2014 (Locarno)
- Running time: 15 minutes
- Country: Canada
- Language: English

Hole is a Canadian short drama film, directed by Martin Edralin and released in 2014.

The film stars Ken Harrower as Billy, a gay man with arthrogryposis multiplex congenita who is struggling to find physical and sexual intimacy. and Sebastian Deery as Craig, his love interest and support worker.

== Accolades ==
The film won the Canadian Screen Award for Best Live Action Short Drama at the 3rd Canadian Screen Awards, and the award for Best Canadian Short Film at the 205 Inside Out Film and Video Festival.
