= Gloryhound =

Canadian musical group

- Origin: Fall River, Nova Scotia, Canada
- Genres: hard rock
- Years active: 2006–present
- Labels: eOne
- Members: Evan Meisner; David Casey; Shaun Hanlon; Jeremy MacPherson
- Past members: Adam Baldwin
- Website: www.gloryhoundband.com

Gloryhound is a Canadian rock band based out of Halifax, Nova Scotia. The band is from Fall River, Nova Scotia. Gloryhound were signed by Entertainment One Canada in 2012. Their album, Loaded Gun, produced by Garth Richardson (Rage Against the Machine) and mixed by Bob Ezrin (Pink Floyd) was released in 2014.

== History ==
=== Gloryhound and the Skyhawks (2006–2007) ===
Gloryhound was founded in 2006 by high school friends Evan Meisner, David Casey, Shaun Hanlon, Jeremy MacPherson, and Adam Baldwin as an alternative country band named Gloryhound and the Skyhawks. Described as "a poor man's El Torpedo", the group enjoyed local success opening for the likes of Dutch Mason, Matt Minglewood, and Matt Mays. After releasing an eponymous album in 2007, Gloryhound and the Skyhawks decided to regroup as a hard rock act under a new name.

=== Name change and Leave it Alone (2008–March 2010) ===
In 2008, the band condensed its name to Gloryhound, and began writing hard rock songs. Eschewing harmonicas and plaid shirts for guitarmonies and leather jackets, the name change also coincided with the amicable departure of Adam Baldwin. The result of these writing sessions would be Leave it Alone, the first album recorded under the name Gloryhound. Produced by Rob Crowell (Deer Tick) and recorded at the Sonic Temple in Halifax, Nova Scotia, Leave it Alone was released independently in December 2009. Subsequent touring throughout 2010 saw the group showcase at conferences such as Canadian Music Week, Junofest in St. John's, Newfoundland and Labrador, and NXNE for the first time. Gloryhound was accompanied to these conferences by friend and advisor Gordon Lapp. Following Gloryhound's Junofest performance, the band signed a booking deal with The Agency Group in March 2010 and formally brought Lapp on as band manager.

=== Electric Dusk (April 2010–September 2012) ===
In the summer of 2010, Gloryhound temporarily relocated to Toronto, Ontario, to begin working on new material. The result was Electric Dusk. Recorded over two days at Chemical Sound Studios and produced by Laurence Currie, Electric Dusk was released independently as a seven song EP in December 2010. The title track, "Electric Dusk", was released as a single to Canadian Rock Radio by Spincount in September 2011. The song would peak at No. 14 on the Canadian Active Rock charts the following March. During extensive touring, the band opened for Sam Roberts Band, Drive By Truckers, and as direct support for Thin Lizzy at the Sound Academy in Toronto on March 30, 2011. The album was nominated for Group Recording of the Year and Rock Recording of the Year at the 2011 Nova Scotia Music Awards. Electric Dusk was nominated for Rock Recording of the year at the 2012 East Coast Music Awards in Moncton, New Brunswick, an award which was won by fellow Nova Scotian act (The Trews).

=== Smoke on the Nation Tour (2012) ===
In January 2012, Gloryhound was announced as direct support for Deep Purple on the Atlantic Canadian leg of Deep Purple's "Smoke on the Nation Tour". The tour included performances at Mile One Centre, Halifax Metro Centre and two nights at Casino New Brunswick. Gloryhound's sets received robust critical reception, prompting one reviewer at Mile One Centre to declare that "Gloryhound were the priests in a temple for old gods."

=== Here and Now Tour support at Magnetic Hill (2012) ===
On 24 April 2012, Gloryhound announced via Facebook that the band would be returning to Moncton for a performance at the Magnetic Hill Concert Site on July 7, 2012. The all-day concert was the only Maritime date on Nickelback's Here and Now Tour 2012–2013, and included performances by Three Days Grace, I Mother Earth, Arkells, and My Darkest Days.

=== eOne label and distribution deal ===
On May 28, 2012, eOne Music Canada announced the signing of Gloryhound to their independent label. As part of the deal, the Electric Dusk EP was remixed and released nationwide on August 21, 2012. The summer EP release was supported by a follow-up single, "TKO Tokyo".

=== Loaded Gun (2013–present) ===
In September 2013, Gloryhound began preproduction for their debut full-length record. Producer Gggarth Richardson, songwriter Josh Guillame, and the band convened in Greenfield, Queens County, to develop songs. After ten days, a field of over thirty compositions and ideas was narrowed down to sixteen potential tracks for the upcoming record. The band continued to flesh out song structures for two months before travelling to Vancouver, British Columbia, in November to begin recording. Tracking was done from November to December at The Farm Studios in Vancouver. The upcoming record, titled Loaded Gun, was released on June 23, 2014. On December 21, 2016, the band announced the departure of original drummer Shaun Hanlon.

== Band members ==
- Evan Meisner – Lead Vocals, Guitar (2006–present)
- David Casey – Lead Guitar, Vocals (2006–present)
- Shaun Hanlon – Drums, Percussion (2006–present)
- Jeremy MacPherson – Bass guitar (2006–present)

== Discography ==
=== Albums ===
- Leave it Alone (2009) self-release
- Electric Dusk (2010) self-release
- Electric Dusk (2012) eOne Music Canada

=== Singles ===
Year	Song	Chart peak		Album
Year	Song	CAN Act	BDS Can Rock	Album
2011	"Electric Dusk"	14	25	Electric Dusk
2012	"TKO Tokyo"	–	37	Electric Dusk
2013	"Let You Down Again"	20	27	--
