= Adam Baldwin (singer) =

Canadian musician

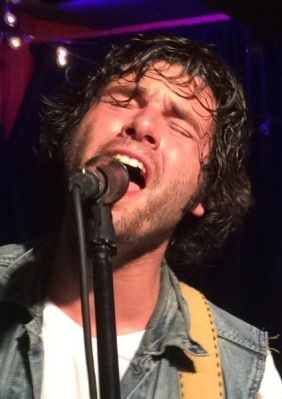
- Adam Baldwin performing with the Carletones featuring Matt Mays, at the Carleton, 2015

Background information
- Born: July 30, 1986 (age 40); Fall River, Nova Scotia, Canada
- Origin: Dartmouth, Nova Scotia, Canada
- Genre: Dartmouth Rock
- Occupation: Singer-songwriter
- Instruments: Vocals, guitar, keyboards
- Years active: 2000s–present
- Label: Sonic Records
- Formerly of: Matt Mays & El Torpedo, The Carletones, Gloryhound and the Skyhawks
- Website: AdamBaldwin.ca

Adam Baldwin (born July 30, 1986) is a Canadian indie rock singer-songwriter based in Dartmouth, Nova Scotia. In addition to his solo work, Baldwin is currently supporting fellow Atlantic Canadian singer Alan Doyle.

== Early life ==
Adam Baldwin was born July 30, 1986, in Halifax, Nova Scotia.

== Career ==
Baldwin's musical career began in 2005 with fellow school-mates, Evan Meisner, David Casey, Shaun Hanlon, and Jeremy MacPherson when they formed the alternative country band Gloryhound and the Skyhawks. Named after a grade 10 science project, Gloryhound and the Skyhawks released a debut, self-titled album in 2008 while performing weekly and opening for local bands such as Dutch Mason, Matt Mays and El Torpedo, and The Trews. It was at this point that Gloryhound's sound began to transition from the traditional Maritimes blues/roots sound with an influence of Neil Young, The Band and Tom Petty into a genre of fast-paced heavy rock.

In 2008, Baldwin left Gloryhound and the Skyhawks and joined Matt Mays & El Torpedo as a keyboardist and vocalist. The album Terminal Romance was released that year, the band toured with Kid Rock and was nominated for 5 East Coast Music Awards including Songwriter of the Year and Group Recording of the Year. In 2009, the band Matt Mays & El Torpedo disbanded. Mays, Baldwin, and Jay Smith were joined by four new members including drummer Damien Moynihan, keyboard player Matt Scott, guitar player Matt Hammond, and former The Guthries member Serge Samson on bass. In 2012, this new band named Matt Mays released Coyote and toured across Canada promoting the new album. Coyote won a Juno Award in 2014 for Rock Album of the Year.

In 2013, Baldwin released an award-winning self-titled solo debut EP. His work was recognized by Music Nova Scotia and he was awarded the titles of Male Artist of the Year and Musician of the Year during the Nova Scotia Music Week in 2014. He released his first full-length album No Telling When (Precisely Nineteen Eighty-Five) in 2016 and in 2019, he released No Rest for the Wicked. Both of these albums won Rock Recording of the Year at the Nova Scotia Music Awards in 2016 and 2019 respectively.

In January 2020, Baldwin was invited to perform for a francophone music variety show, Mix Sonore, hosted by Martha Wainwright. This meeting between Baldwin and Wainwright turned out to be one that would influence Baldwin to continue to make his music.

In March 2020, Baldwin launched his Cross-Country Chin Up concert series via YouTube. This provided Baldwin with an opportunity to perform to a virtual audience and raise funds for many organizations including the Mental Health Foundation of Nova Scotia, Red Cross Stronger Together Nova Scotia Fund, RCMP Fallen Officer Fund, and the Black Cultural Society for Nova Scotia. Two digital EPs: Chin Up Sessions, featuring his own material and Songs for the Parlour, featuring covers, were produced as a result of these sessions.

September 2022 saw the release of Concertos and Serenades. A song from the album, "Lighthouse in Little Lorraine", centred on the true story of a cocaine smuggling ring that embroiled the small fishing village of Little Lorraine, Nova Scotia, in the 1980s. The song's music video was directed by Andy Hines, with whom Baldwin subsequently collaborated on the screenplay for a feature film telling of the story. The film, Little Lorraine, premiered at the 2025 Toronto International Film Festival, followed by a screening at the 2025 Atlantic International Film Festival, where Hines and Baldwin won the Michael Weir award for best screenwriting.

== Discography ==
=== Gloryhound and the Skyhawks ===
- Gloryhound and the Skyhawks (2008)

=== Matt Mays and El Torpedo ===
- Matt Mays + El Torpedo (2005)
- Terminal Romance (2008)

=== Matt Mays ===
- Coyote (2012)

=== Solo ===
| Title | Details |
|---|---|
| Adam Baldwin – EP | Release date: October 15, 2013; Label: Sonic Records; Formats: CD, Digital |
| No Telling When (Precisely Nineteen Eighty-Five) | Release date: June 24, 2016; Label: Sonic Records; Formats: CD, Vinyl, Digital |
| No Rest for the Wicked – EP | Release date: March 29, 2019; Label: Sonic Records; Formats: CD, Vinyl, Digital |
| Chin up Sessions | Release date: My 22, 2020; Format: Digital |
| Songs for the Parlour | Release date: April 9, 2021; Format: Digital |
| Concertos and Serenades | Release date: September 23, 2022; Formats: CD, Vinyl, Digital |

== Singles ==
- "Love You with My Eyes Closed" (2013)
- "Daylight" (2016)
- "Rehtaeh" (2016)
- "Salvation" (2019)

== Awards and achievements ==
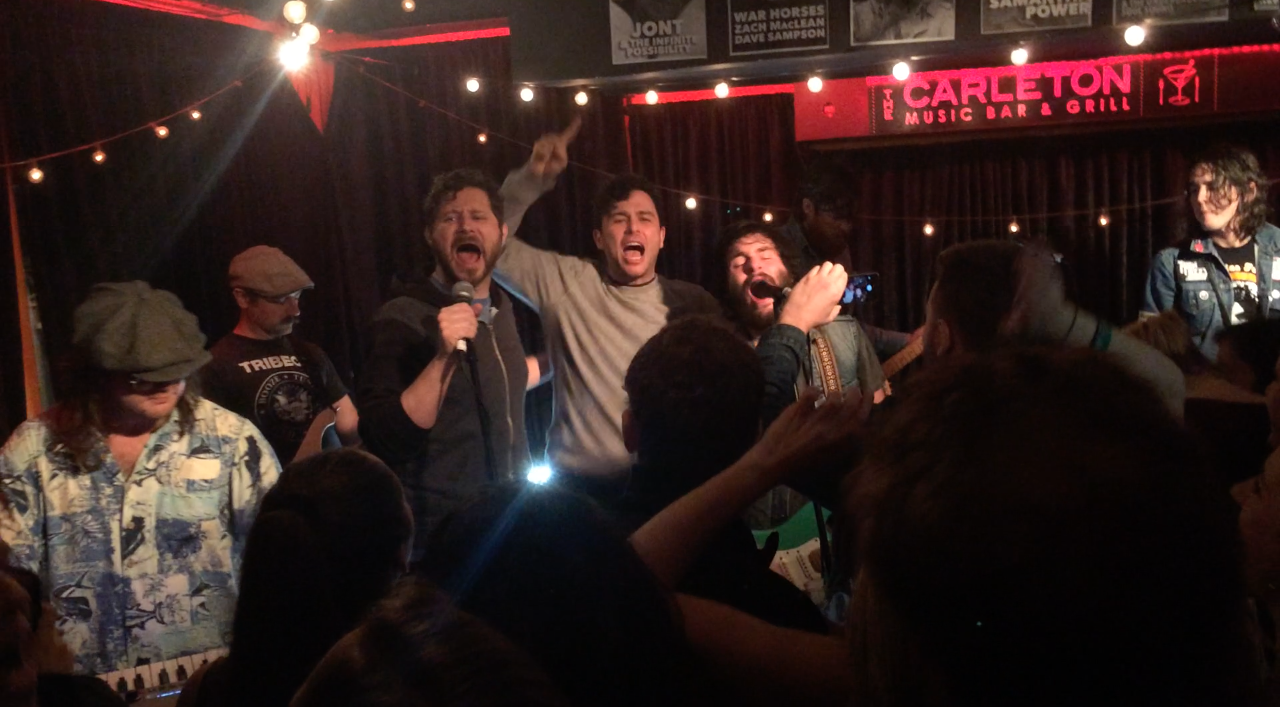
Adam Baldwin, alongside Max Kerman and Dan Mangan performing 'Dancing in the Dark,' live at The Carleton, January 23, 2016

- East Coast Music Awards
  - 2017 – Rock Recording of the Year – No Telling When (Precisely Nineteen Eighty-Five) (nomination)
  - 2017 – Fan's Choice Entertainer of the Year (nomination)
  - 2017 – Fan's Choice Video of the Year – Daylight (nomination)
  - 2020 – Rock Recording of the Year – No Rest for the Wicked (nomination)
  - 2023 – Solo Recording of the Year – Concertos & Serenades (nomination)
  - 2023 – Song of the Year – Lighthouse in Little Lorraine (win)
- Music Nova Scotia Awards
  - 2014 – Male Artist Recording of the Year – Adam Baldwin (win)
  - 2014 – Musician of the Year (win)
  - 2016 – Rock Recording of the Year – No Telling When (Precisely Nineteen Eighty-Five) (win)
  - 2019 – Rock Recording of the Year – No Rest for the Wicked (win)
  - 2023 – SOCAN Songwriter of the Year (win)
