= Electric Dusk =

EP by Gloryhound
- Released: 21 August 2012
- Recorded: July 2010 at Chemical Sound And Sunnyside Studios, Toronto, Ontario, Canada
- Genre: Hard rock
- Length: 25:13
- Label: eOne
- Producer: Laurence Currie

Electric Dusk is the debut EP by Canadian rock band Gloryhound. The album was initially recorded by the band and issued as a self-release in 2010. The EP was later remixed, remastered and rereleased across Canada after Gloryhound was signed to eOne Music Canada.

== Track listing ==
1. "TKO Tokyo" – 3:30
2. "Electric Dusk" – 3:21
3. "Cruel Little Tease" – 3:49
4. "Yes You Are" – 3:56
5. "Fever Stricken Night" – 3:54
6. "Hung Up" – 3:44
7. "Keep A Light On You" – 2:59

== Personnel ==
- Evan Meisner – vocals, rhythm guitar, piano
- David Casey – lead guitar, vocals
- Shaun Hanlon – drums, percussion
- Jeremy MacPherson – bass guitar
- Laurence Currie – production, mixing
- Dean Marino – assistant engineer
- Jay Sadlowski – assistant engineer
- Noah Mintz (at Sterling Sound) – mastering
- Nathan Quinn – A&R

== Singles ==
| Year | Song | Chart peak | | Album |
| Year | Song | CAN Act | BDS Can Rock | Album |
|---|---|---|---|---|
| 2011 | "Electric Dusk" | 14 | 25 | Electric Dusk |
| 2012 | "TKO Tokyo" | – | 37 | Electric Dusk |

== Awards and nominations ==
| Year | Presenter | Award | Result |
|---|---|---|---|
| 2013 | Canadian Radio Music Awards | Rock single of the year "Electric Dusk" | Nominated |
| 2012 | East Coast Music Awards | Video of the Year "Electric Dusk" | Nominated |
| 2012 | Nova Scotia Music Awards | Group Recording of the Year | Nominated |
| 2012 | Nova Scotia Music Awards | Video of the Year "Electric Dusk" | Nominated |

== Song placement ==
=== Film and television ===
- "TKO Tokyo" featured in Less Than Kind season 4 on HBO Canada
- "Electric Dusk featured in the film Love Me (2013)
- "Keep a Light on You" featured in Global TV Rookie Blue season 4
- "Cruel Little Tease" opened Charlie Zone dir. by Michael Melski (2011)

=== Sports ===
- "Electric Dusk" featured on Plays of the Week on NHL network (2011)
- TKO Tokyo" featured on CFL plays of the week (2012)
