= Emma (2016 film) =

- Directed by: Martin Edralin
- Written by: Martin Edralin
- Produced by: Martin Edralin; Lauren Corber
- Starring: Hailey Kittle; Mandy May Cheetham; Justin LeRoy; Goldbloom Micomonaco; Madeleine Sims-Fewer
- Cinematography: Daniel Grant
- Edited by: Bryan Atkinson
- Music by: Ben Fox
- Production company: LoCo Motion Pictures
- Release date: September 2016 (TIFF)
- Running time: 13 minutes
- Country: Canada
- Language: English

Emma is a Canadian short drama film, directed by Martin Edralin and released in 2016. The film stars Hailey Kittle as Emma, a young girl coping with alopecia, who must learn how not to let herself be dragged down by what other people think.

The cast also includes Mandy May Cheetham, Justin LeRoy, Goldbloom Micomonaco and Madeleine Sims-Fewer.

The film premiered at the 2016 Toronto International Film Festival, and was later screened at the 2016 Vancouver International Film Festival.

It was subsequently named to TIFF's annual year-end Canada's Top Ten list for 2016.
