= Wildhood =

2021 Canadian coming-of-age film

- Film poster
- Directed by: Bretten Hannam
- Written by: Bretten Hannam
- Produced by: Julie Baldassi; Damon D'Oliveira; Gharrett Patrick Paon
- Starring: Phillip Lewitski; Joshua Odjick
- Cinematography: Guy Godfree
- Edited by: Shaun Rykiss
- Music by: Neil Haverty
- Production companies: Rebel Road Films; Younger Daughter Films
- Distributed by: Films Boutique
- Release date: September 10, 2021 (TIFF)
- Running time: 100 minutes
- Country: Canada
- Languages: English; Mi'kmaq

Wildhood is a 2021 Canadian coming-of-age romantic drama film, written and directed by Bretten Hannam.

An expansion of Hannam's earlier short film Wildfire, which was the winner of the award for Best Short Film at the Screen Nova Scotia awards in 2020, the film stars Phillip Lewitski as Lincoln, a young man in his late teens who was raised disconnected from his maternal Mi'kmaq heritage by his abusive white father Arvin (Joel Thomas Hynes). Following the discovery that his mother Sarah, whom he had long been told was dead, is in fact still alive, he takes his younger half-brother Travis (Avery Winters-Anthony) on a journey to find her. En route, they meet the openly two-spirit Pasmay (Joshua Odjick), who becomes both a guide to Lincoln in reconnecting with his indigenous roots and a love interest.

The cast also includes Michael Greyeyes, Savonna Spracklin, Jordan Poole, Samuel Davison and Steve Lund.

== Plot ==
Lincoln "Link" (Lewitski) is a teenager in his late teens who lives with his abusive single father and younger brother Travis (Winters-Anthony) in a run-down trailer park in Canada. After a particularly brutal beating, and upon learning that his mother, whom he had long believed to be dead, is still alive, Link impulsively runs away with Travis to go find her.

At a store buying supplies, Link meets Pasmay (Odjick), a Mi'kmaq powwow dancer, who expresses an interest in Link, but Link rudely ignores him. When he tries to pay for his groceries, the store clerk accuses him of stealing. Link angrily storms out with his brother; he is followed by Pasmay who announces himself as a fellow Mi'kmaq and defends the two from the clerk's racist behaviour. Link becomes defensive, and a short scuffle ensues, but the three quickly board Pasmay's car when the store clerk threatens to call the police. Initially only accepting Pasmay's help to leave the store and drive away from his father in a car chase, Link eventually agrees to hitchhike further in Pasmay's car when he claims he has food. Later that evening Pasmay expresses sympathy towards Link's circumstances and insists he will help the two brothers find their birth mother; Pasmay also teaches Travis some of his indigenous language.

Over time the three boys form a close but slightly rocky relationship with one another. Link, Pasmay and Travis visit a rehab centre that Link's mom apparently lived at for some time, but the owner reveals she was kicked out and refuses to provide any personal information to Link, which incenses him. He storms out upset and frustrated, but is happy when Pasmay reveals he stole the rehab centre's file on Link's mom, which provides an address for her. When they visit the home, they find it completely abandoned and derelict; Link finds old photos of his mom and cries while wearing one of her old dresses. Pasmay teaches the boys about indigenous language and culture. Early one morning he teaches Link his powwow dance routine, but Link walks away embarrassed when Travis ridicules him.

After Pasmay's car breaks down and they get caught in heavy rain, they accept a ride from "Smokey" (Michael Greyeyes), who claims he will help Link find his mom if Link helps him in return with a small errand as part of his cake-making business. The group go to an exotic nightclub named "Tiger Lily" where Link's mom previously worked. There he meets a drag queen who provides him with information on the tribe that Link's mom belongs to. Smokey offers to help the boys further, but Link politely declines. Still, he accepts Smokey's offer of cash and thanks him in his native language. Travis storms away, upset at Link's constant demands of him and hints that he knows that he and Pasmay are attracted to each other, which Link unconvincingly denies. Link eventually wins him over with the promise of a hotel room and hot food. The next evening, when Travis has fallen asleep, Pasmay invites Link to go swim with him in a nearby waterfall. There the two kiss and have sex for the first time. The next morning Pasmay asks him if Link feels okay about the experience. Link admits that he liked it but he'd never had sex "like that" before.

When Pasmay suggests that Link give up on searching for his mom, as he thinks she clearly doesn't want to meet him, Link roughly pushes him and calls him a "cocksucker". Pasmay walks away, upset. The two eventually reconcile and reaffirm their love for one another. Link finds the tribe that his mom belongs to. She apologises for abandoning him; when Link asks if she wants to be his mom, she tearfully says yes. She also subtly suggests that she knows Link and Pasmay are now a couple and tells Link that Pasmay is waiting for him. The two boys hug, and Travis, standing nearby, also joins the embrace. The film ends with the three boys joyfully dancing to Pasmay's powwow routine on the beach.

== Cast ==
- Phillip Lewitski as Link
- Joshua Odjick as Pasmay
- Avery Winters-Anthony as Travis
- Joel Thomas Hynes as Arvin
- Michael Greyeyes as Smokey
- Steve Lund as Dale
- Mary-Colin Chisholm as Alice
- Savonna Spracklin as Sarah
- Desna Michael Thomas as Desna
- John R. Sylliboy as Mother Mary
- Becky Julian as Elsapet
- Callum Dunphy as Ross
- Ursula Calder as Amy
- Samuel Davison as Ryan
- Jordan Poole as Skater

== Production and distribution ==
The film's screenplay won Telefilm Canada's Pitch This! competition at the 2018 Toronto International Film Festival, and was funded by Telefilm Canada in 2019. The film entered production in 2020 in the Windsor, Nova Scotia area.

The film premiered at the 2021 Toronto International Film Festival on September 10, 2021. It was subsequently screened at the 2021 Cinéfest Sudbury International Film Festival, the 2021 Atlantic Film Festival, and the 2021 Vancouver International Film Festival. It has been acquired for commercial distribution by Films Boutique.

== Critical response ==
On the review aggregator website Rotten Tomatoes, the film has a 100% approval rating, based on 35 reviews, with an average rating of 7.5/10. The website's consensus reads, "A coming-of-age story with several refreshing twists, Wildhood sends its protagonist on a bittersweet, beautifully filmed journey."

Lovia Gyarkye of The Hollywood Reporter reviewed the film favourably, writing that "The trio’s dynamic is entertaining, and they crack jokes with the same fierceness with which they argue. But it’s the evolving romance between Link and Pasmay that’s the most fun to witness. Maybe I’m a sucker for romance, but watching Link and Pasmay steal glances and exchange knowing smirks begins to feel more thrilling than the journey itself. Lewitski, who stars in Hulu's Utopia Falls, and Odjick have a subtle and exciting chemistry that makes rooting for their budding love easy. The progress of that love is measured by the proximity of their bodies, which, as they get closer to finding Sarah, feel bound by an almost spiritual force."

For The Coast, Morgan Mullin wrote that "the movie is at its strongest when it turns away from the family that abandoned its leads and leans into their frisson-filled connection instead (even if their most intimate moment borrows a touch too heavily from Moonlight). Traipsing the countryside together and awash in that magic-hour light, the two youth learn to be themselves while Pasmay teaches Link powwow dancing."

== Awards ==
Award	Date of ceremony	Category	Recipient(s)	Result	Ref(s)
Cinéfest Sudbury International Film Festival	2021	Cinema Indigenized Outstanding Talent	Bretten Hannam	Won	
FIN Atlantic Film Festival	2021	Best Feature	Wildhood	Won	
FIN Atlantic Film Festival	2021	Best Director	Bretten Hannam	Won	
FIN Atlantic Film Festival	2021	Best Screenwriter	Bretten Hannam	Won	
FIN Atlantic Film Festival	2021	Best Actor	Avery Winters-Anthony	Won	
Directors Guild of Canada	2021	DGC Discovery Award	Bretten Hannam	Nominated	
Canadian Screen Awards	2022	Best Picture	Gharrett Patrick Paon, Julie Baldassi, Bretten Hannam	Nominated	
Canadian Screen Awards	2022	Best Director	Bretten Hannam	Nominated	
Canadian Screen Awards	2022	Best Actor	Phillip Lewitski	Nominated	
Canadian Screen Awards	2022	Best Supporting Actor	Joshua Odjick	Won	
Canadian Screen Awards	2022	Best Original Screenplay	Bretten Hannam	Nominated	
Canadian Screen Awards	2022	Best Casting in a Film	Stephanie Gorin	Nominated	
Vancouver Film Critics Circle	March 7, 2022	Best Supporting Actor in a Canadian Film	Joshua Odjick	Won	
Screen Nova Scotia	2022	Best Feature Film	Wildhood	Nominated	
Screen Nova Scotia	2022	ACTRA Award for Outstanding Performance	Mary-Colin Chisholm	Nominated	
Screen Nova Scotia	2022	ACTRA Award for Outstanding Performance	Desna Michael Thomas	Nominated	
Screen Nova Scotia	2022	ACTRA Award for Outstanding Performance	Avery Winters Anthony	Won	
Kingston Canadian Film Festival	2022	People's Choice Award	Wildhood	Won	
