= North Mountain (film) =

- Directed by: Bretten Hannam
- Written by: Bretten Hannam
- Produced by: Bretten Hannam; Kevin Kincaid
- Starring: Justin Rain; Glen Gould; Meredith MacNeill
- Cinematography: Tarek Abouamin
- Edited by: Christopher Cooper
- Music by: Lukas Pearse; Mike Ritchie
- Production company: Mazeking Pictures
- Release date: September 23, 2015 (AFF)
- Running time: 78 minutes
- Country: Canada
- Language: English

North Mountain is a 2015 Canadian action thriller film. Written and directed by Bretten Hannam and billed as a "cross between Brokeback Mountain and Rambo".

== Plot ==
Wolf, a young Mi'kmaq hunter encounters Crane, a wanted fugitive, in the forest. The two men fall in love and begin a relationship, which is tested when the gangsters looking for Crane arrive.

== Cast ==
- Justin Rain as Crane
- Glen Gould as Wolf
- Meredith MacNeill as Mona
- Gharrett Patrick Paon as Kirby
- Glenn Lefchak as Dodge
- Johnny Terris as Buddy
- Gary Levert as Sylas
- Scott Baker as Lewis
- Daniel Fanaberia as Pierce
- Zach Tovey as Foster
- Katherine Sorbey as Nan
- John Allen MacLean as Hudson

== Release ==
Shot near Kejimkujik National Park in January 2015, the film premiered on September 23, 2015 at the Atlantic Film Festival in Halifax, Nova Scotia, Canada. It screened at various LGBT film festivals, including Toronto's Inside Out Film and Video Festival and the Vancouver Queer Film Festival, in 2016, and received a limited commercial run in 2018 at Toronto's Carlton Theatre.

== Reception ==
In his review of the film, Andrew Parker of TheGATE wrote, “While it’s decidedly rough around the edges, the unique Canadian thriller North Mountain certainly earns points for originality and the desire to tell what could have been a standard B-movie potboiler from a fresh perspective.”

== See also ==
- List of lesbian, gay, bisexual or transgender-related films of 2015
- List of LGBTQ-related films
