= The Mango Bride =

2013 novel by Marivi Soliven

- First edition
- Author: Marivi Soliven
- Language: English
- Publisher: New American Library
- Publication date: April 28, 2013
- Publication place: United States

The Mango Bride is a 2013 novel written by United States-based Filipino author Marivi Soliven. Soliven wrote the first draft of the novel as part of the National Novel Writing Month. In its manuscript form, initially titled In the Service of Secrets, the novel won the 2011 Carlos Palanca Memorial Award for Literature.

== Synopsis ==
The novel follows two Filipino women who move to the United States. Socialite Amparo Guerrero is banished from Manila after disgracing her wealthy family. Meanwhile, impoverished Beverly Obejas travels as a mail-order bride in hopes of a better life. They both settle in Oakland, California, where their lives soon intersect.

== Adaptation ==
In February 2022, it was reported that Filipino actress Sharon Cuneta would star and executive produce a film adaptation, with Martin Edralin directing and Rae Red adapting the novel as a screenplay.
