= Bretten Hannam =

Canadian screenwriter and film director

Bretten Hannam is a Canadian screenwriter and film director.

A Two-Spirit, non-binary Mi'kmaq person, Hannam was born and raised in Nova Scotia. Educated at the Nova Scotia College of Art and Design and Dalhousie University, they made a number of short films in their early career; the most noted of these, Deep End, premiered at the Atlantic Film Festival in 2011 and was included in the short film compilation Boys on Film 9: Youth in Trouble.

Their 2015 feature film, North Mountain, premiered at the Atlantic Film Festival in 2015 before going into limited commercial release in 2018.

In 2018, they participated in Now and Then, an exhibition of works by LGBTQ artists in conjunction with the Canadian Lesbian and Gay Archives. Their contribution was the short film Elmiteskuatl, an interrogation of the complex relationship between First Nations peoples and colonialist conceptions of archives and museums.

Their most recent short film, Wildfire, was produced with the assistance of the Whistler Film Festival's Aboriginal Filmmaker Fellowship, and premiered at BFI Flare in 2019. A feature film expansion of Wildfire, titled Wildhood, was funded by Telefilm Canada in June 2019, and premiered at the 2021 Toronto International Film Festival. The film received six Canadian Screen Award nominations at the 10th Canadian Screen Awards in 2022, including nods for Hannam in both Best Director and Best Original Screenplay.

In 2020, Hannam received a grant from the Inside Out Film and Video Festival's Re:Focus Emergency Relief Fund for the completion of a short documentary film titled Walqwin, about two-spirit culture in the Wabanaki Confederacy.

Hannam was named the winner of the $10,000 Toronto Film Critics Association's Jay Scott Prize for emerging filmmakers in February 2022.

Hannam's film At the Place of Ghosts (Sk+te’kmujue’katik) premiered in the Platform Prize program at the 2025 Toronto International Film Festival. It was subsequently screened at the 2025 Atlantic International Film Festival, where it won the Gordon Parsons Award for Best Atlantic Canadian Feature.

== Filmography ==
- New Skin - 2008
- Puppy - 2010
- Deep End - 2011
- North Mountain - 2015
- Elmiteskuatl - 2018
- Wildfire - 2019
- Wildhood - 2021
- At the Place of Ghosts (Sk+te’kmujue’katik) - 2025
