= Joséphine Bacon =

Innu poet (born 1947)

Joséphine Bacon OC
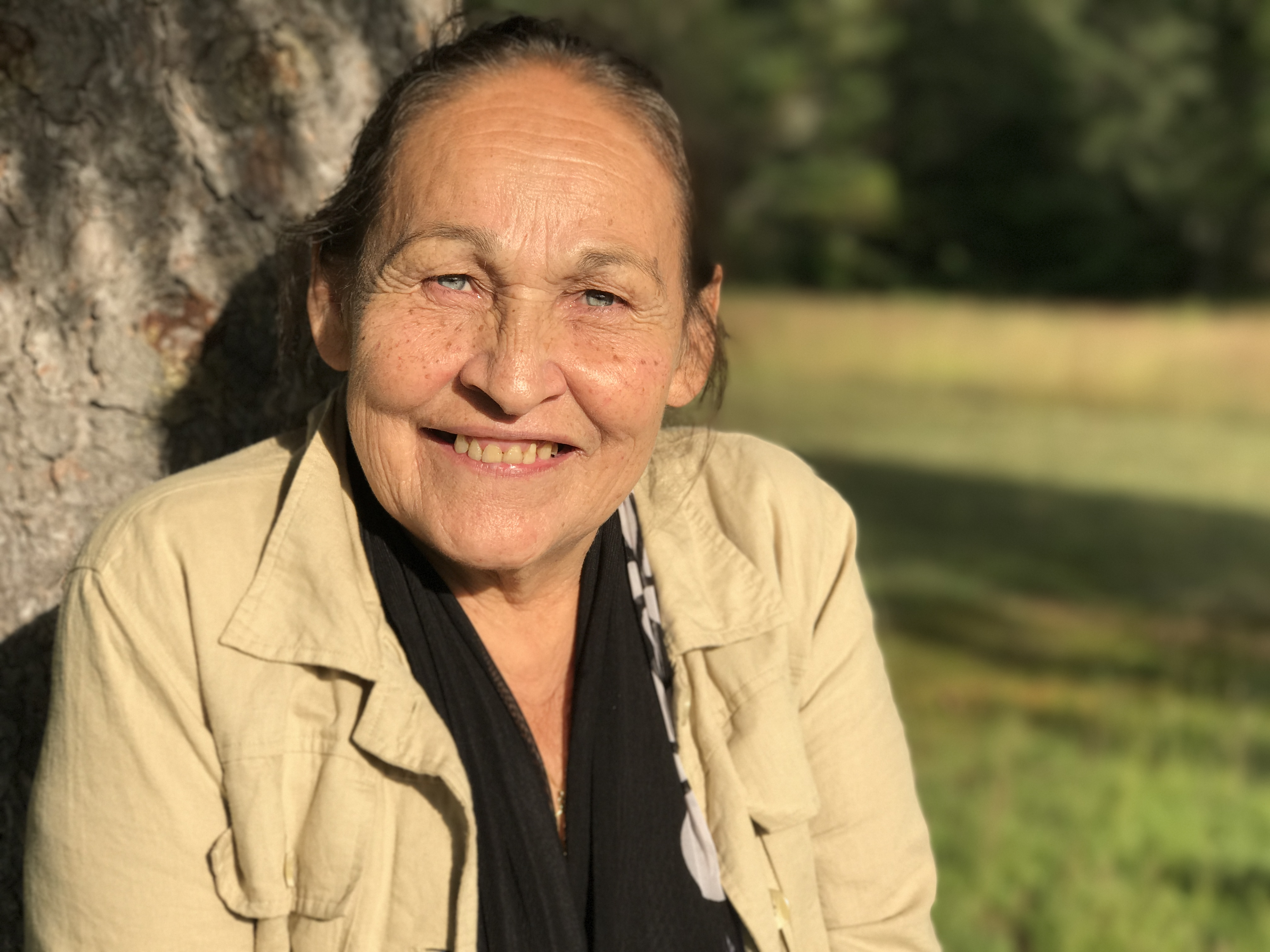
- Joséphine Bacon at the festival Manitou 2017, Mont-Tremblant, QC
- Born: 23 April 1947 (age 79); Pessamit
- Occupations: poet, documentary film maker, lyricist, translator, teacher
- Writing career
- Language: Innu-aimun, French

Joséphine Bacon OC (born April 23, 1947), is an Innu poet from Pessamit in Quebec. She publishes in French and Innu-aimun. She has also worked as a translator, community researcher, documentary filmmaker, curator and as a songwriter for Chloé Sainte-Marie and Alexandre Belliard. She has also curated an exhibit at the Grande Bibliothèque in Montreal, Quebec and teaches at Kiuna Institution in Odanak.

== Life and career ==
Bacon was born in the Innu community of Pessamit in 1947 and spent the first five years of her life out on the land with her family before entering boarding school in Maliotenam. In the 1960s she moved to Quebec City where she worked as a secretary, later attending secretarial school in Ottawa run by the Office of Aboriginal Affairs. She moved to Montreal in 1968 and later became a translator and transcriber for anthropologists interviewing important Innu elders and knowledge keepers in Labrador and Quebec.

She is the subject of Kim O'Bomsawin's 2020 documentary film Call Me Human (Je m'appelle humain). She subsequently collaborated with O'Bomsawin as co-directors of the documentary film Nitassinan, which is slated to premiere at the First Peoples' Festival (Présence Autochtone) in 2026.

She was appointed as an Officer of the Order of Canada in 2023. She currently resides in Montreal.

== Works ==
- Désobéissons ! Eka pashishtetau !. Tinqueux : Éditions du Centre de créations pour l'enfance, 2019
- Uiesh |Quelque part. Montréal, Mémoire d’encrier, 2018
- A tea in the tundra = Nipishapui nete mushuat. translated by Donald Winkler. Bookland Press, 2017
- Guetter l'aurore : littératures et résistances, 1944-2014. Genouilleux: Passe du Vent, 2014
- Akin Kadipendag Trickster. Montreal: Possible Editions, 2014
- Mingan my village : poems by Innu schoolchildren. translated by Solange Messier. Fifth House Publishers, 2014
- Un thé dans la toundra = Nipishapui nete mushuat. Mémoire d'encrier, 2013
- Mingan, mon village : poèmes d'écoliers innus. co-authored with Rogé, Laure Morali, Rita Mestokosho. Éditions de la Bagnole,2012
- Nous sommes tous des sauvages. co-authored with José Acquelin. Mémoire d'encrier, 2011
- Bâtons à message| Message Sticks | Thissinuashitakana. Montreal: Mémoire d'encrier, 2010
- La créature des neiges = Kunapeu. Bibliothèque et Archives nationales du Québec, 2008

== Filmography ==
Bacon has directed one documentary, and has worked as a translator and narrator in documentaries by film maker Arthur Lamothe and Gilles Carle, including:

- Tshishe Mishtikuashisht - Le petit grand européen : Johan Beetz (1997)
- Ameshkuatan - Les sorties du castor (1978)

Her first documentary film, about a meeting between Innu elders and clan mothers from Kahnawake, has been lost.

In 2025, she appeared in Caroline Monnet's short film Pidikwe (Rumble), which premiered at the 75th Berlin International Film Festival.

== Awards and distinctions ==
=== Literary awards ===
- 2010: Readers' Prize at the Montreal Poetry Market for the poem "Dessine-moi l’arbre".
- 2017: Ostana International Prize for writing in a mother tongue.
- 2019: Prix des libraires du Québec, in the Quebec poetry category, for Uiesh / Quelque part.
- 2019: Indigenous Voices Award, in the published works in French category, for Uiesh / Quelque part.

=== Honours ===
- 2016: Honorary doctorate in anthropology from Université Laval.
- 2018: Companion of the Ordre des arts et des lettres du Québec.
- 2018: Officer of the Ordre de Montréal.

=== Award nominations ===
- 2014: Finalist for the Governor General's Award for French-language poetry for Un thé dans la toundra / Nipishapui nete mushuat.
- 2014: Finalist for the Grand Prix du livre de Montréal for Un thé dans la toundra / Nipishapui nete mushuat.
