= What We Dreamed of Then =

2025 film by Taylor Olson

- Theatrical release poster
- Directed by: Taylor Olson
- Written by: Taylor Olson
- Produced by: Stephen Foster; Britt Kerr; Sandy Hunter
- Starring: Taylor Olson
- Cinematography: Kevin A. Fraser
- Edited by: Shawn Beckwith
- Music by: Zachary Greer
- Production companies: Brass Door Productions; Cazador; Hemmings Films
- Distributed by: Vortex Media; Crave
- Release date: September 12, 2025 (AIFF)
- Running time: 104 minutes
- Country: Canada
- Language: English

What We Dreamed of Then is a 2025 Canadian drama film written and directed by Taylor Olson. The film stars Olson as Gideon, a swim coach experiencing "unseen homelessness" and living in a van, while keeping his homelessness a secret. The cast also includes Christie Burke, Parveen Kaur, Hugh Thompson, Eugene Sampang, Martha Irving, Koumbie, Breton Lalama and Katelyn McCulloch.

The film's budget of CA$1.3 million is funded by the governments of New Brunswick and Nova Scotia, along with Screen Nova Scotia and Telefilm Canada. The film went into production in Saint John, New Brunswick, in 2024, with the working title Unseen. Described as the "largest English-spoken film to be shot in New Brunswick in more than a decade," filming in Saint John took place in May 2024.

The film premiered at the 2025 Atlantic International Film Festival, and was also screened in the Features Canada program at the 2025 Cinéfest Sudbury International Film Festival.

The film won the award for Best Dramatic Feature at the 2026 Cinequest Film & Creativity Festival.
