= Ramón Who Speaks to Ghosts =

2025 Canadian short film directed by Shervin Kermani

- Directed by: Shervin Kermani
- Written by: Shervin Kermani; Karla Reyes
- Produced by: Shervin Kermani; Karla Reyes
- Starring: Pedro Moisés Herrera Concepción
- Cinematography: Karla Reyes
- Edited by: Shervin Kermani
- Production company: La Selva Ecosistema Creatiu
- Release date: September 4, 2025 (TIFF)
- Running time: 8 minutes
- Countries: Canada; Spain
- Language: Spanish

Ramón Who Speaks to Ghosts is a short docufiction film, directed by Shervin Kermani and released in 2025. The film stars Pedro Moisés Herrera Concepción as Ramón, a man living on La Palma in the Canary Islands who is attempting to communicate with the dead following the 2021 Cumbre Vieja volcanic eruption.

The film premiered at the 2025 Toronto International Film Festival. Its followup screenings included the 2025 Atlantic International Film Festival, and the 2025 Vancouver International Film Festival.

== Reception ==
The film was named to the Toronto International Film Festival's annual year-end Canada's Top Ten list for 2025.

== Awards ==
At the 2025 Whistler Film Festival, it was the winner of the Best Canadian ShortWork award. At the 2025 Tallinn Black Nights Film Festival, it received a special jury mention in the live-action shorts competition.
