= At the Place of Ghosts =

2025 film by Bretten Hannam

- Theatrical release poster
- Mi'kmaq: Skɨte'kmujue'katik
- Directed by: Bretten Hannam
- Written by: Bretten Hannam
- Produced by: Diana Elbaum; Mitchel Fleming; Martin Katz; Jason Levangie; Marc Tetrault
- Starring: Blake Alec Miranda; Forrest Goodluck; Brandon Oakes; Glen Gould
- Cinematography: Guy Godfree
- Edited by: Shaun Rykiss; Anne-Laure Guégan
- Music by: Jeremy Dutcher; Devon Bate
- Production companies: Shut Up & Colour Pictures; Prospero Pictures; Mazewalker Film; Beluga Tree
- Distributed by: VVS Films
- Release dates: 6 September 2025 (TIFF); 8 May 2026 (Canada)
- Running time: 89 minutes
- Countries: Canada; Belgium
- Languages: English; Mi'kmaq; French

At the Place of Ghosts (Mi'kmaq: Skɨte'kmujue'katik, frequently spelled in English-language sources as Sk+te'kmujue'katik) is a 2025 supernatural thriller film written and directed by Bretten Hannam. The film stars Forrest Goodluck and Blake Alec Miranda as Mise'l and Antle, two Mi'kmaq brothers who have become estranged in adulthood due to childhood trauma, who become haunted by a malevolent spirit and must reunite and journey into Mi'kmaq: Skɨte'kmujue'katik, the Place of Ghosts, to face their demons and heal.

The cast also includes Glen Gould as their father, and Skylar Cope and Atuen MacIsaac as the boys in childhood, as well as Brandon Oakes, Alexander Nunez, David Rossetti, Jason Daley, Tanchay Redvers, Pamela Matthews, Nancy Kenny, David Mortimer and Ainsley Cope in supporting roles. An international co-production between Canada and Belgium, the film was shot in and around Halifax, Nova Scotia during summer 2024.

The film premiered in the Platform Prize program at the 2025 Toronto International Film Festival on 6 September 2025. It was subsequently screened on 10 September as the opening film of the 2025 Atlantic International Film Festival. The film was released theatrically in Canada on 8 May 2026.

== Reception ==
=== Critical response ===
On the review aggregator website Rotten Tomatoes, 100% of 10 critics' reviews are positive.

=== Accolades ===
At AIFF, the film won the Gordon Parsons Award for Best Atlantic Canadian Feature. Guy Godfree also won the Best Atlantic Cinematographer award, and Jeremy Dutcher won the award for Best Atlantic Score.

It screened in the Borsos Competition program at the 2025 Whistler Film Festival.

The film was named to the Toronto International Film Festival's annual year-end Canada's Top Ten list for 2025.

It won the award for Best Feature Film at the 2026 Screen Nova Scotia awards, and Skyler Cope won the award for Groundbreaking Performance for his performance as the younger Mise'l.

Charlotte Gavaris and Chris Bridges won the Canadian Screen Award for Best Makeup at the 14th Canadian Screen Awards in 2026, and Toni Warren was nominated for Best Hairstyling.

Hannam won the DGC Award for Best Direction in a Feature Film at the Directors Guild of Canada awards in 2026.
