= La Mayordomía =

- Directed by: Martin Edralin
- Written by: Martin Edralin
- Produced by: Martin Edralin
- Cinematography: Daniel Grant; Alejandro Coronado
- Edited by: Martin Edralin; Brendan Mills
- Music by: Edgardo Moreno
- Production company: Circus Zero
- Release date: April 28, 2025 (Hot Docs)
- Running time: 23 minutes
- Country: Canada
- Language: Spanish

La Mayordomía is a Canadian short documentary film, directed by Martin Edralin and released in 2025. The film documents a Mexican ritual in which families are entrusted with the care of various figurines of Jesus Christ for a year.

The film premiered at the 2025 Hot Docs Canadian International Documentary Festival, where it won the Audience Award for Short Films.

The film was named to the Toronto International Film Festival's annual year-end Canada's Top Ten list for 2025, and received a Canadian Screen Award nomination for Best Short Documentary at the 14th Canadian Screen Awards in 2026.
