= Dancing on the Elephant =

2025 Canadian comedy-drama film

- Film poster
- Directed by: Julia Neill; Jacob Z. Smith
- Written by: Lisa Hagen
- Produced by: Tanya Preyde; Walter Forsyth
- Starring: Sheila McCarthy; Mary Walsh; Amanda Brugel
- Cinematography: Kevin A. Fraser
- Edited by: Angela Baker
- Music by: Mo Kenney
- Production company: Gorgeous Mistake Productions
- Release date: September 13, 2025 (AIFF)
- Running time: 94 minutes
- Country: Canada
- Language: English

Dancing on the Elephant is a Canadian comedy-drama film, directed by Julia Neill and Jacob Z. Smith and released in 2025. Adapted from the stage play by Lisa Hagen, the film stars Sheila McCarthy as Nora, a woman involuntarily placed in a retirement home by her family, who meets fellow retiree Edna (Mary Walsh) and sets out to reclaim control of her life by embarking on an adventure with her new friend.

The cast also includes Amanda Brugel as Barbara, a nurse at the retirement home, as well as Reid Price, Jordan Poole, Bob Mann, Laura Jones, Micha Cromwell, Sara Campbell, Kevin Kincaid, Lee J. Campbell, Murlane Carew, Shane Harbinson, Jeff Schwager, Alvena Poole, Sandi Rankaduwa and Patrick Cadegan in supporting roles.

== Production ==
The film was shot in Halifax, Nova Scotia, in spring 2024.

== Distribution ==
The film premiered at the 2025 Atlantic International Film Festival. and has also screened at Cinfest Sudbury, Edmonton International Film Festival, and St. John's International Women's Film Festival.

== Awards ==
At AIFF, Walsh won the Joan Orenstein and David Renton Award for best performance, and Angela Baker won the award for Best Atlantic Editor.
