= Daniel Grant (cinematographer) =

Canadian cinematographer

Daniel Grant is a Canadian cinematographer. He is most noted for his work on the documentary film The Messenger, for which he was a Canadian Screen Award nominee for Best Cinematography in a Documentary at the 4th Canadian Screen Awards in 2016, and the feature film Octavio Is Dead!, for which he was a Canadian Screen Award nominee for Best Cinematography at the 7th Canadian Screen Awards in 2019.

His other credits have included the films Hole, Emma, The Real Inglorious Bastards, The Husband, What We Have (Ce qu'on a), Into the Forest, ARQ, Tammy's Always Dying, The Rest of Us, Night Raiders and All My Puny Sorrows.
