= The Pitch (film) =

- Directed by: Michèle Hozer
- Screenplay by: Michèle Hozer; Bryn Hughes
- Produced by: Michèle Hozer
- Starring: Diana Matheson
- Cinematography: John Minh Tran
- Edited by: Michèle Hozer
- Production company: The Cutting Factory
- Distributed by: TVOntario
- Release date: September 15, 2025 (AIFF)
- Running time: 98 minutes
- Country: Canada
- Language: English

The Pitch is a 2025 Canadian documentary film, directed by Michèle Hozer. The film profiles Canadian Olympic soccer player Diana Matheson, and her successful post-retirement efforts to launch the Northern Super League for women's soccer.

The film premiered at the 2025 Atlantic International Film Festival. It then undertook selected commercial screenings in various Canadian cities, prior to being broadcast by TVOntario in November.
