= Michèle Hozer =

Michèle Hozer is a Canadian film director and editor, known for her work in documentary film.

Born and raised in Montreal, Quebec, she studied film at Concordia University, and began her career as an editor for the National Film Board of Canada. Professionally, she has been based in Toronto, Ontario.

She made her debut as a director with the 2009 film Genius Within: The Inner Life of Glenn Gould, which she co-directed with Peter Raymont. The film premiered at the 2009 Toronto International Film Festival. Hozer and Raymont then collaborated on West Wind: The Vision of Tom Thomson in 2011. She founded The Cutting Factory, her own editing studio which has also since been her production shingle as a documentarian.

She made her solo directorial debut with Sugar Coated, which premiered at the Hot Docs Canadian International Documentary Festival in 2015. Her subsequent films as a director have included The Barber of Augusta, SponsorLand and Atomic Reaction.

Her film The Pitch is slated to premiere at the 2025 Atlantic International Film Festival.

== Filmography ==
=== Director ===
- Genius Within: The Inner Life of Glenn Gould - 2009
- West Wind: The Vision of Tom Thomson - 2011
- Sugar Coated - 2015
- The Barber of Augusta - 2016
- SponsorLand - 2017
- Atomic Reaction - 2024
- The Pitch - 2025

=== Editor ===
- 15th Anniversary - 1989
- Our National Parliament: The Inside Story - 1990
- Making Steel - 1992
- Talking Translation: Sheila Fischman, Roch Carrier - 1993
- Economix - 1995-96, short film series
- Beauty Begins Inside: The P Syndrome - 1995
- Can't Stop Now - 1999
- Building for Disasters - 2000
- Naked in New York - 2000
- The Nature of Things: "Race for the Future II" - 2000
- Diet Wars - 2001
- The Undefended Border - 2002
- Arctic Dreamer: The Lonely Quest of Vilhjalmur Stefansson - 2003
- Shake Hands with the Devil: The Journey of Roméo Dallaire - 2004
- Soferet: A Special Scribe - 2006
- China Rises: "Party Games" - 2006
- A Promise to the Dead: The Exile Journey of Ariel Dorfman - 2007
- Last Call at the Gladstone Hotel - 2007
- Triumph: Dr. James Orbinski's Humanitarian Dilemma - 2008
- Tar Sands: The Selling of Alberta - 2008
- That's My Time - 2008
- Genius Within: The Inner Life of Glenn Gould - 2009
- The Team - 2010
- West Wind: The Vision of Tom Thomson - 2011
- Fight Like Soldiers, Die Like Children - 2012
- The Lost Highway - 2014
- Sugar Coated - 2015
- The Barber of Augusta - 2016
- SponsorLand - 2017
- The Reckoning: Hollywood's Worst Kept Secret - 2018
- Inviolable: The Fight for Human Rights - 2018

== Awards ==
Award	Date of ceremony	Category	Work	Result	Ref.
Gemini Awards	2000	Best Picture Editing in an Information Program or Series	The Nature of Things: "Race for the Future II"	Won	
Gemini Awards	2005	Best Picture Editing in a Documentary Program or Series	Shake Hands with the Devil: The Journey of Roméo Dallaire	Won	
Canadian Screen Awards	2016	Donald Brittain Award	Sugar Coated	Won	
Canadian Cinema Editors	2011	Best Editing in a Feature Documentary	Genius Within: The Inner Life of Glenn Gould	Nominated	
Canadian Cinema Editors	2012	Best Editing in a Feature Documentary	West Wind: The Vision of Tom Thomson	Won	
Canadian Cinema Editors	2013	Best Editing in a Feature Documentary	Fight Like Soldiers, Die Like Children	Nominated	
Canadian Cinema Editors	2016	Best Editing in a Feature Documentary	Sugar Coated	Nominated	
Canadian Cinema Editors	2019	Best Editing in a Short-Form Documentary	Inviolable: The Fight for Human Rights	Nominated	
International Documentary Association	2010	Best Music Documentary	Genius Within: The Inner Life of Glenn Gould	Nominated	
News and Documentary Emmy Awards	2011	Outstanding Individual Achievement in a Craft: Editing	A Promise to the Dead: The Exile Journey of Ariel Dorfman	Nominated	
