= The Dating Game (film) =

2025 documentary

- Directed by: Violet Du Feng
- Produced by: Joanna Natasegara; James Costa; Mette Cheng Munthe-Kaas
- Cinematography: Wei Gao
- Edited by: John Farbrother
- Music by: Chad Cannon
- Distributed by: Violet Films (United Kingdom)
- Release date: January 23, 2025 (Sundance)
- Running time: 90 minutes
- Countries: United States; United Kingdom; Norway

The Dating Game is a 2025 documentary directed and produced by Violet Du Feng. The film follows a week-long dating camp in China where three bachelors learn how to find love.

== Production ==
The film was produced by Fish+Bear Pictures and Violet Films; the production was also associated with Bird Street Productions, Ten Thousand Images, and Chicken & Egg Pictures.

== Release and distribution ==
It debuted at the Sundance Film Festival on January 23, 2025 in the World Documentary category. The film is currently seeking distribution.

== Synopsis ==
The film follows three Chinese men—Zhou, Li, and Wu—as they attend a seven-day dating camp in Chongqing to learn how to find love from two dating coaches—Hao and Wen—who are married to each other.

== Critical reception ==
On the review aggregator website Rotten Tomatoes, 60% of 15 critics' reviews are positive, with an average rating of 5.2/10. Metacritic, which uses a weighted average, assigned the film a score of 65 out of 100, based on 6 critics, indicating "generally favorable" reviews.

JoySauce said that the film "walks a fine tonal line with care and precision, and shows empathy towards a group of men who might not otherwise find it from their own kin" but questioned whether it really challenged "the root causes of the problems it suggests."

IndieWire gave the film a B− rating, lauding the relationship shown between Hao and Wen but otherwise finding the film unfocused with its asymmetric development of its subjects and its tackling of questions too big for it to answer.

Vulture critiqued the film's second half, noting its lack of focus due to "cursory tangents to expand its scope to larger China" as well as its resignation to Hao's "shallow" ideas around dating; the reviewer also pointed out a loose series of facts and observations about Chinese dating culture writ large that felt lacking in cohesion.
