= Little Lorraine (film) =

2025 Canadian crime drama film

- Theatrical release poster
- Directed by: Andy Hines
- Written by: Adam Baldwin; Andy Hines
- Produced by: Tim Doiron; James van der Woerd; Michael Volpe
- Starring: Stephen Amell; Sean Astin; J Balvin
- Cinematography: Jeff Powers
- Edited by: Anna Hauger; Yoni Reiss
- Production companies: Wango Films; Topsail Entertainment
- Distributed by: Photon Films
- Release date: September 5, 2025 (TIFF)
- Running time: 116 minutes
- Country: Canada
- Language: English

Little Lorraine is a 2025 Canadian crime drama film, directed by Andy Hines. Hines's debut feature following a career directing music videos, the film centres on the story of the small town of Little Lorraine, Nova Scotia, a small seaside fishing village which became embroiled in an international cocaine smuggling ring in the 1980s.

The song changed the location from Louisburg to the nearby town Little Lorraine, and the drugs being smuggled from hashish to cocaine for rhyming purposes.

The film stars Stephen Amell, Sean Astin and J Balvin in his acting debut, as well as Matt Walsh, Rhys Darby, Stephen McHattie, Steve Lund, Sugar Lyn Beard, Hugh Thompson, Mike Dopud, Kaelen Ohm, Joshua Close, Auden Thornton, Manuel Rodriguez-Saenz, Mark A. Owen, Dax Ravina, Luis Javier and David Mortimer in supporting roles.

== Production ==
Singer-songwriter Adam Baldwin previously wrote about the story in his 2022 single "Lighthouse in Little Lorraine". Hines directed that song's video, and subsequently used it as his proof of concept to shop the film version around to film studios.

The film was shot in Nova Scotia and Ontario in summer 2024.

== Distribution ==
The film premiered in the Discovery program at the Toronto International Film Festival on September 5, 2025. It was also screened as the Atlantic Gala at the 2025 Atlantic International Film Festival.

== Reception ==
=== Critical response ===
On the review aggregator website Rotten Tomatoes, 100% of 12 critics' reviews are positive.

For That Shelf, Courtney Small wrote that "despite the rocky road to its climax, Hines constructs a thrilling crime drama that is elevated by McHattie’s sensational turn. As the manipulative Huey, a man who attempts to keep everyone under his corrupt thumb, McHattie delivers a riveting and menacing performance. His turn is nicely accentuated by Amell’s strong work as the everyman who finds himself inadvertently stepping into a narcotic quicksand. Bringing resonating layers to a role that could have easily been one-note in a lesser actor’s hands, Amell gives the film its resonating core."

=== Awards ===
At AIFF, McHattie won the Joan Orenstein and David Renton award for Best Performance, and Hines and Baldwin won the award for Best Atlantic Screenplay.

The film was longlisted for the 2025 Jean-Marc Vallée DGC Discovery Award.

It also screened in the Borsos Competition program at the 2025 Whistler Film Festival.
