= Amanda Brugel =

Canadian actress (born 1978)

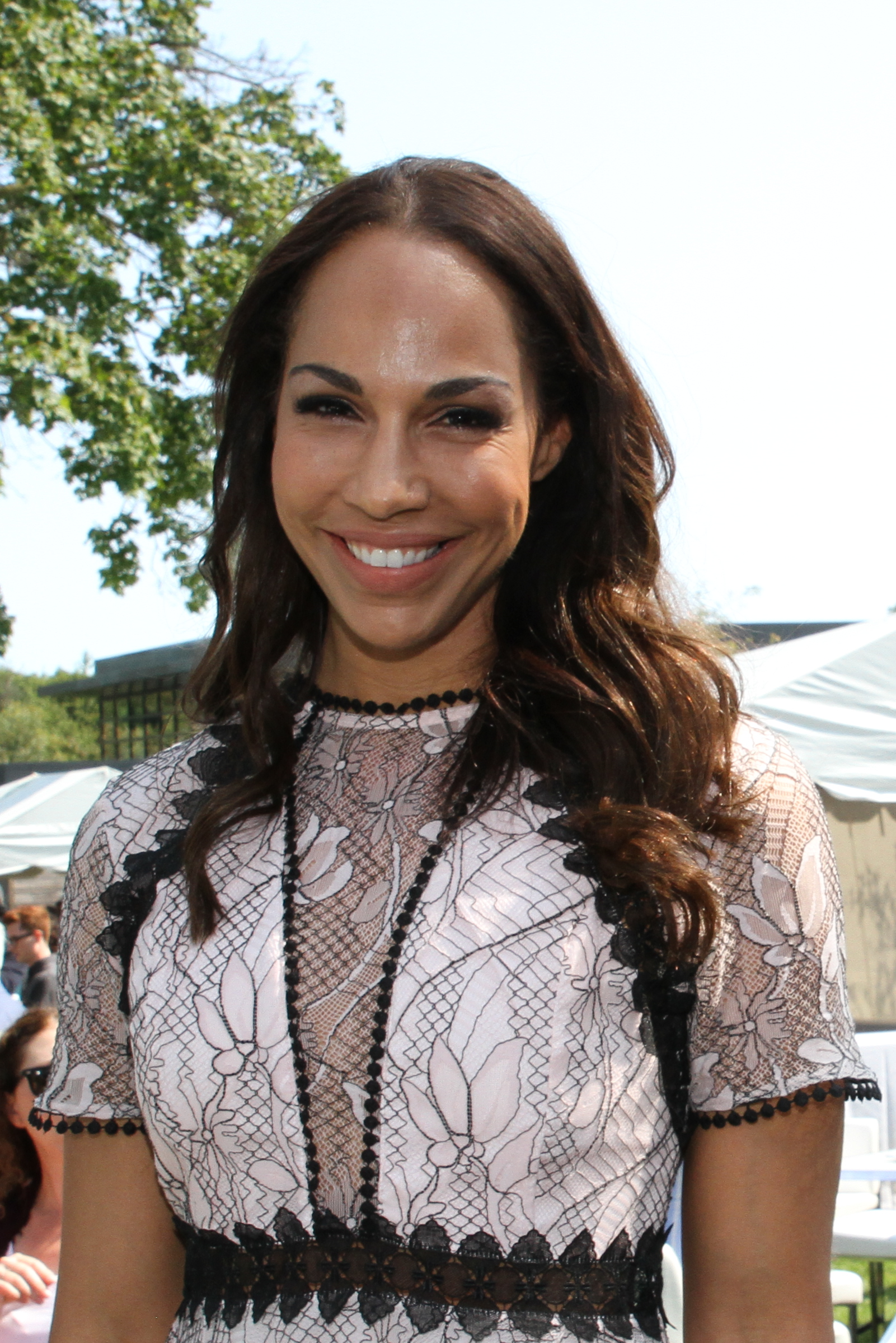
- Brugel in 2017
- Born: March 24, 1978 (age 48); Pointe-Claire, Quebec, Canada
- Education: York University
- Occupation: Actress
- Years active: 1999–present
- Partner: Aidan Shipley
- Children: 2

Amanda Brugel (born March 24, 1978) is a Canadian actress. Born and raised in Pointe-Claire (a suburb of Montreal), Quebec, she made her acting debut in the drama film Vendetta (1999). This was followed by roles in the comedy film A Diva's Christmas Carol (2000), the slasher horror film Jason X (2001), the comedy film Sex After Kids (2013), for which she won an ACTRA Award for Best Female Performance, the satirical drama film Maps to the Stars (2014), the independent drama film Room (2015), the superhero film Suicide Squad (2016), the drama film Kodachrome (2017), and the action thriller film Becky (2020).

Brugel starred as Lynnie Jordan in the Showcase soap opera Paradise Falls (2008), Michelle Krasnoff in the Citytv comedy series Seed (2013–2014), Marci Coates in the Space science fiction series Orphan Black (2015), Nina Gomez in the CBC comedy series Kim's Convenience (2016–2021), and Rita Blue in the Hulu dystopian drama series The Handmaid's Tale (2017–2025). In 2021, Brugel joined the judging panel of the second season of the reality competition series Canada's Drag Race.

Throughout her career, Brugel has received several accolades, including two Canadian Screen Awards for her work in Kim's Convenience and Canada's Drag Race, and an ACTRA Award win and Canadian Comedy Award nomination for her performance in Sex After Kids.

== Early life ==
Brugel was born in Pointe-Claire, Quebec, Canada. Her mother is English, and immigrated to Canada, while her biological father, whom she never met, is African-American. Her mother later married a man of South Asian (or Southeast Asian) and of Jewish descent. He adopted Brugel, and she has stated that she considers him her father.

She started out as a dancer but quit when she grew to be taller than her partners. She entered the renowned Theatre Program at York University with a Fine Arts talent scholarship and graduated with a Bachelor of Fine Arts degree in 2000.

== Career ==
In 1999, Brugel made her acting debut in the HBO drama film Vendetta, alongside Christopher Walken. In 2000, she had a role in A Diva's Christmas Carol, a Christmas television film starring Vanessa Williams, Rozonda Thomas, and Kathy Griffin. She made her feature film debut as Geko in the slasher horror film Jason X (2001) and starred in the horror television film Kaw (2007).

Brugel appeared in guest or recurring roles in several television series, including Soul Food (2001), Wild Card (2004), Kojak (2005), Kevin Hill (2005), The Newsroom (2005), Paradise Falls (2008), MVP (2008), Saving Hope (2012), Flashpoint (2012), Nikita (2013), and Covert Affairs (2013).

In 2013, she earned critical praise for her starring role as Vanessa in the comedy film Sex After Kids. For her performance, she received an ACTRA Award for Outstanding Female Performance, and a nomination for a Canadian Comedy Award. From 2013 to 2014, she starred as Michelle Krasnoff in the Citytv comedy series Seed.

In 2014, Brugel appeared in David Cronenberg's satirical drama film Maps to the Stars, alongside Julianne Moore, and the crime thriller film The Calling, alongside Susan Sarandon. In 2015, she portrayed Marci Coates in several episodes of the Space science fiction series Orphan Black. That same year, she appeared as Officer Parker in the independent drama film Room, which earned a nomination for the Academy Award for Best Picture and won the Canadian Screen Award for Best Motion Picture.

In 2016, she appeared in the superhero film Suicide Squad. That same year, she began a recurring role as Pastor Nina Gomez in the CBC comedy series Kim's Convenience, for which she received the Canadian Screen Award for Best Guest Performance, Comedy. In 2017, she appeared in the Netflix drama film Kodachrome.

Brugel had recurring roles as Sita Petronelli in the USA Network drama series Eyewitness (2016) and as Sonia in the CBC comedy series Workin' Moms (2018), for which she was nominated for the Canadian Screen Award for Best Supporting Actress, Comedy.

Since 2017, Brugel has starred as a housekeeper named Rita, in the Hulu dystopian drama series The Handmaid's Tale, based on Margaret Atwood's acclaimed novel of the same name. As a part of the cast, she has received three nominations for the Screen Actors Guild Award for Outstanding Performance by an Ensemble in a Drama Series.

From 2019 to 2020, Brugel had a recurring role as Faith Hanlon in the USA Network teen drama series Dare Me. In 2020, she appeared as Eugenia in multiple episodes of the TNT post-apocalyptic drama series Snowpiercer, which is an adaptation of the film of the same name. Also that year, Brugel starred as Kayla in the action thriller film Becky.

In 2020, Brugel appeared as a panelist on Canada Reads, advocating for Samra Habib's memoir We Have Always Been Here. She successfully defended the memoir and won the competition.

On June 29, 2021, it was announced that Brugel, along with Brad Goreski, would join the judging panel of Canada's Drag Race for its sophomore season after season one judges Jeffrey Bowyer-Chapman and Stacey McKenzie announced their departures in March and June 2021 respectively. Alongside Goreski and main judge Brooke Lynn Hytes, Brugel served as a rotating judge with Traci Melchor. The group of judges won a Canadian Screen Award for their work on the second season. Before the third season, Brugel was removed from the panel, with no replacement given.

== Personal life ==
Brugel has two children from her previous marriage to Marcel Lewis.

In 2013, Brugel founded Brugs Army, a non-profit organization that focuses on improving the lives of women and children.

== Filmography ==
=== Film ===
Year	Title	Role	Notes
1999	Vendetta	Red Lantern Lady	TV movie
2000	A Diva's Christmas Carol	Olivia	TV movie
2001	Jason X	Private Geko Chavez	
2002	10,000 Black Men Named George	Waitress	TV movie
2002	Jack & Ella	Elizabeth	
2003	This Time Around	Abby	TV movie
2003	Beautiful Girl	Connie	TV movie
2004	Category 6: Day of Destruction	Leslie Singer	TV movie
2004	A Question	-	Short
2005	Devil's Perch	Secretary	TV movie
2007	Kaw	Emma	
2007	What If God Were the Sun?	Lupe	TV movie
2009	The Death of Alice Blue	Amanda	
2013	Sex After Kids	Vanessa	
2013	Treading Water	Nurse	
2014	Maps to the Stars	Star! Channel Interviewer	
2014	The Calling	Officer Vongarner	
2015	Room	Officer Parker	
2015	Charming Christmas	Nadine	TV movie
2016	Love's Complicated	Kate	TV movie
2016	Suicide Squad	National Security Council	
2016	Sadie's Last Days on Earth	Detention Teacher	
2017	Sometimes the Good Kill	Faith	TV movie
2017	Kodachrome	Doctor	
2018	Emmy	Emmy	Short
2019	Marie Celeste	Marie Celeste	Short
2020	Becky	Kayla	
2020	Flashback	Evelyn	
2020	Sugar Daddy	Nancy	
2021	Like a House on Fire	Audrey	
2021	He Murdered Sleep	Lady Macbeth	Short
2022	Ashgrove	Jennifer	
2023	Infinity Pool	Jennifer	
2025	Sweetness	Marnie	
2025	Nika and Madison		
2025	Dancing on the Elephant	Barbara	

=== Television ===
Year	Title	Role	Notes
2001	Soul Food	Trixie	Episode: "Everything Is Unfolding Perfectly"
2001	Leap Years	Tamara	Episode: "#1.4"
2001	Tracker	Uniformed Officer	Episode: "The Beast"
2002	The 5th Quadrant	Cassandra Morgan	Episode: "Wild Animal King/Divining Miss M"
2004	Wild Card	Evelyn	Episode: "Queen Bea"
2004	Doc	Sheree	Episode: "Wedding Bell Blues"
2005	Kevin Hill	Leanne Wheeden	Episode: "Man's Best Friend"
2005	The Newsroom	Nurse	Episode: "Latent Homosexual Tendencies"
2005	Kojak	Theresa	Episode: "All That Glitters"
2006	This Is Wonderland	Lucy Jamieson	Episode: "#3.9"
2006	G-Spot	Maureen	Episode: "Payne Killer"
2006	Naked Josh	Toula	Episode: "Planned Parenthood"
2008	MVP	Megan Chandler	Main cast
2008	Paradise Falls	Lynnie Jordan	Recurring cast: season 3
2009	Da Kink in My Hair	Elize	Episode: "Looks Can Be Revealing"
2010	Life Unjarred	Kim	Episode: "Episode #1.4" & "#1.8"
2011	InSecurity	Amanda	Episode: "The Spy, the Friend and Her Lover"
2012	The Firm	District Attorney Sonia Swain	Recurring cast
2012	Saving Hope	Lisa Rundel	Episode: "Contact"
2012	Flashpoint	Trish	Episode: "Keep the Peace: Part 1"
2013	The Ron James Show	Linda Lanning	Episode: "CCON Evolution" & "Truth, Lies and Spin"
2013	Warehouse 13	Amy	Episode: "The Big Snag"
2013	Nikita	Janet Malcolm	Episode: "Til Death Do Us Part"
2013	Covert Affairs	Olivia	Recurring cast: season 4
2013–2014	Seed	Michelle Krasnoff	Main cast
2015	Orphan Black	Marci Coates	Recurring cast: season 3
2015	Dark Matter	Keeley	Episode: "Pilot - Part 1 & 2"
2016	Eyewitness	Sita Petronelli	Recurring cast
2016	You Got Trumped: The First 100 Days	Kelly	Recurring cast
2016–2021	Kim's Convenience	Pastor Nina Gomez	Recurring cast
2017–2025	The Handmaid's Tale	Rita Blue	Recurring cast: season 1, main cast: seasons 2–6
2018	Workin' Moms	Sonia	Recurring cast: season 2
2019–2020	Dare Me	Faith Hanlon	Recurring cast
2020–2021	Snowpiercer	Eugenia	Recurring cast: seasons 1–2
2020–2021	Canada's Drag Race	Herself / Judge	Guest: season 1, main cast: season 2
2021–2022	Pretty Hard Cases	Detective Karina Duff	Recurring cast
2022	Sort Of	Gaia	3 episodes
2024	Law & Order Toronto: Criminal Intent	Lee Sloane	season 1 episode 3 "The Real Eve"
2024	Parish	Sister Anne	Recurring cast
2024–present	Dark Matter	Blaire Caplan	Recurring role (season 1); main role (season 2)
2025	Murderbot	Rita / GrayCris Blue	Season 1 episodes 7–9
2026	The Testaments	Rita Blue	Episode 7: "Commitment"

== Awards and nominations ==
Year	Association	Category	Work	Result	Ref.
2014	ACTRA Award	Outstanding Performance – Female	Sex After Kids	Won	
2014	Canadian Comedy Award	Best Performance by a Female – Film	Sex After Kids	Nominated	
2018	Screen Actors Guild Award	Outstanding Performance by an Ensemble in a Drama Series	The Handmaid's Tale	Nominated	
2019	Screen Actors Guild Award	Outstanding Performance by an Ensemble in a Drama Series	The Handmaid's Tale	Nominated	
2019	Canadian Screen Award	Best Supporting Actress, Comedy	Workin' Moms	Nominated	
2020	Screen Actors Guild Award	Outstanding Performance by an Ensemble in a Drama Series	The Handmaid's Tale	Nominated	
2020	Canadian Screen Award	Best Guest Performance, Comedy	Kim's Convenience	Won	
2022	Screen Actors Guild Award	Outstanding Performance by an Ensemble in a Drama Series	The Handmaid's Tale	Nominated	
2022	Canadian Screen Award	Best Guest Performance, Comedy	Pretty Hard Cases	Nominated	
2022	Canadian Screen Award	Best Host or Presenter, Factual or Reality/Competition (Shared with Brooke Lynn Hytes, Traci Melchor, and Brad Goreski)	Canada's Drag Race	Won	
2022	Canadian Screen Award	Best Host in a Web Program or Series (Shared with Steven McCarthy)	2021 CAFTCAD Awards	Nominated	
