= Agatha's Almanac =

- Directed by: Amalie Atkins
- Screenplay by: Amalie Atkins
- Produced by: Amalie Atkins
- Starring: Agatha Bock
- Cinematography: Rhayne Vermette
- Edited by: Amalie Atkins
- Production company: Minema Cinema
- Distributed by: Films We Like
- Release date: March 23, 2025 (CPH:DOX)
- Running time: 87 minutes
- Country: Canada
- Language: English

Agatha's Almanac is a Canadian documentary film, directed by Amalie Atkins and released in 2025. The film is a portrait of her aunt Agatha Bock, a 90-year-old woman who still lives a fiercely independent life revolving around her passion for gardening.

The film premiered in March 2025 at CPH:DOX 2025. It had its Canadian premiere at the 2025 Hot Docs Canadian International Documentary Festival, where it won the juried award for Best Canadian Feature Documentary.

The film was longlisted for the 2025 Jean-Marc Vallée DGC Discovery Award, and was named to the Toronto International Film Festival's annual year-end Canada's Top Ten list for 2025.
