= Martin Edralin =

Canadian film director

- Occupations: Film director; 3rd Canadian Screen Awards
- Awards: Canadian Screen Award for Best Live Action Short Drama

Martin Edralin is a Canadian film director. His first short film, Hole, won the Canadian Screen Award for Best Live Action Short Drama at the 3rd Canadian Screen Awards in 2015, the Grand Prix at the 2015 Clermont-Ferrand International Short Film Festival in 2015, and a jury award at the 2014 Locarno Festival.

His second short film, Emma, was named to the Toronto International Film Festival's year-end Canada's Top Ten list in 2016, and won First Prize at the 2017 Rhode Island International Film Festival.

He was announced to be directing an adaptation of The Mango Bride in February 2022.

His feature film debut, Islands, premiered at the 2021 SXSW and was awarded Special Jury Recognition for Breakthrough Performance. Islands was nominated for the John Dunning Best First Feature Award at the 10th Canadian Screen Awards in 2022.

His short documentary film La Mayordomía premiered at the 2025 Hot Docs Canadian International Documentary Festival, where it won the Audience Award for Short Films.
