= Andy Hines (director) =

Canadian filmmaker

Andrew Hines is a Canadian filmmaker from Nova Scotia, whose feature film debut Little Lorraine premiered in 2025.

Hines, the son of photographer Sherman Hines, began his career as a music video director, creating videos for artists such as Tory Lanez, Logic, Big Sean, Classified, Alicia Keys, Keith Urban, Jason Derulo, J Balvin, Lizzo, Coldplay, Matthew Good and Anderson .Paak.

His video for Big Sean's "One Man Can Change the World" was the winner of the MTV Music Video Award for Best Video with a Social Message at the 2015 MTV Video Music Awards. His video for Logic's "1-800-273-8255" was a Grammy Award nominee for Best Music Video at the 60th Annual Grammy Awards in 2018 , and his video for Classified's "Powerless" received a Juno Award nomination for Video of the Year at the Juno Awards of 2019, as well as being shortlisted for the 2019 Prism Prize.

In 2022 he directed the video for Adam Baldwin's single "Lighthouse in Little Lorraine", which he subsequently used as proof of concept to secure studio interest in a feature film treatment of the true story that inspired the song. Little Lorraine premiered in the Discovery program at the 2025 Toronto International Film Festival. It was subsequently screened at the 2025 Atlantic International Film Festival, where Hines and Baldwin won the Michael Weir Award for best screenwriting.

Hines said he hoped to use a similar music video adaptation approach to secure financing for other film ideas.
