= Pidikwe =

Pidikwe (Rumble)
- Theatrical release poster
- Directed by: Caroline Monnet
- Written by: Caroline Monnet
- Produced by: Caroline Monnet
- Starring: Joséphine Bacon; Émilie Monnet
- Cinematography: Nicolas Canniccioni
- Edited by: Marc Boucrot
- Music by: Alessandro Cortini
- Production companies: Chantier Monnet; Coop Vidéo de Montréal
- Distributed by: La Distributice de films
- Release date: February 18, 2025 (Berlin)
- Running time: 10 minutes
- Country: Canada

Pidikwe (Rumble) is a 2025 Canadian short documentary film directed by Caroline Monnet. The film depicts a multigenerational group of Indigenous Canadian women, celebrating their heritage in a performance mixing modern and traditional indigenous dance.

The women performing in the film include Joséphine Bacon, Catherine Boivin, Catherine Dagenais-Savard, Émilie Monnet, Aïcha Bastien N'Diaye and Caroline Monnet.

The film premiered at the 75th Berlin International Film Festival.

The film was named to the Toronto International Film Festival's annual year-end Canada's Top Ten list for 2025, and was shortlisted for the Prix collégial du cinéma québécois in the Best Short Film category in 2026.
