= Shervin Kermani =

Shervin Kermani is a Canadian film director and screenwriter based in Toronto, Ontario, most noted for his short films Bibi's Dog Is Dead and Ramón Who Speaks to Ghosts.

Bibi's Dog Is Dead was a Canadian Screen Award nominee for Best Live Action Short Drama at the 13th Canadian Screen Awards in 2025. Ramón Who Speaks to Ghosts won the Best Canadian ShortWork award at the 2025 Whistler Film Festival, and was named to the Toronto International Film Festival's annual year-end Canada's Top Ten list for 2025.

He is a graduate of the image arts program at Toronto Metropolitan University.

== Filmography ==
- Sofia - 2010
- For Drapell - 2013
- Eros - 2018
- Bibi's Dog Is Dead - 2024
- Ramón Who Speaks to Ghosts - 2025
