= Alex Boya =

Alex Boya is a Bulgarian-born Canadian animator based in Montreal, Quebec. He is most noted for his 2025 short film Bread Will Walk, which was a Canadian Screen Award nominee for Best Animated Short at the 14th Canadian Screen Awards in 2026.

== Filmography ==
- Tiles (Carreau) - 2012
- Focus - 2014
- Turbine - 2018
- Bread Will Walk - 2025
