= Amalie Atkins =

Canadian artist

Amelie Atkins
- Born: 1975 (age 50–51); Saskatoon, Saskatchewan
- Education: Alberta College of Art and Design
- Known for: film
- Website: http://amalieatkins.ca/

Amalie Atkins is a Canadian artist making use of film, fabric-based sculpture and performance. She currently resides in Saskatoon, Saskatchewan.

Her most recent artworks have been short silent films set to music. Atkins's films are either shown alone or within an installation.

== Early life and education ==
Atkins grew up in rural Manitoba, from where she still draws inspiration, citing the landscape of her youth as a significant influence. Fiber art was Atkins' area of study when she undertook her undergraduate degree at the Alberta College of Art and Design, where she graduated with distinction in 2001.

== Career ==
Her work has been exhibited across Canada and the USA. A dreamlike or fairy-tale character is often attributed to Atkins's work. Repeated motifs include loose teeth, the colour red, fields of snow, and bicycles. Women on journeys are equally a recurring theme in her work, as are vast landscapes inspired by her experience of the Canadian prairies.

Atkins' early short films were shot on Super 8 while the most recent Three Minute Miracle was shot on 16 mm film. Using film as a support and textiles contributes to the many textural references in Atkins's work. The work Three Minute Miracle was largely inspired by different fibre-focused projects she had previously undertaken. Atkins's participated in "Oh Canada" at the Massachusetts Museum of Contemporary Art (MASS MoCA) which showcased over 60 artists, showing her film "Three Minute Miracle". The aim of the exhibition was to create a dialogue about contemporary art made in Canada.

In 2003 she founded the Bike Ballet Club: a cycling trio. She is the co-founder and an active member of the Optronic Eye Film Club.

In 2013 she was nominated for the Sobey Award.

In 2025 she directed the documentary film Agatha's Almanac, aboout her elderly aunt Agatha Bock. The film won the juried award for Best Canadian Feature Documentary at the 2025 Hot Docs Canadian International Documentary Festival.

== Exhibitions ==
- Oh, Canada, MASS MoCA
- Dreamland: Textiles and the Canadian Landscape, Textile Museum of Canada
- They Made a Day Be a Day Here, Art Gallery of Grande Prairie
- where the hour floats, Art Gallery at the Evergreen Cultural Centre, Coquitlam, BC
- The Diamond Eye Assembly, Remai Modern, Saskatoon, SK

== Festivals ==
- Kunsthaus Tacheles, Berlin
- SoHo20 Chelsea Gallery, New York

== Awards ==
- Locale Art Award for Western Canada, 2011
- Long-listed for the Sobey Art Award, 2012 and 2013
