= Bread Will Walk =

2025 Canadian animated short film

- Directed by: Alex Boya
- Written by: Alex Boya
- Produced by: Jelena Popović
- Starring: Jay Baruchel
- Music by: Martin Floyd Cesar
- Production company: National Film Board of Canada
- Release date: May 2025 (Cannes)
- Running time: 11 minutes
- Country: Canada
- Language: English

Bread Will Walk is a Canadian short animated film, directed by Alex Boya and released in 2025. The film is a satire about climate change in which a corporation tries to solve hunger by selling loaves of "miracle" bread that turn people who eat it into zombie loaves of bread, who are in turn under threat of being eaten themselves.

All speaking characters in the film are voiced by Jay Baruchel.

The film premiered at the 2025 Cannes Film Festival.

The film received a Canadian Screen Award nomination for Best Animated Short at the 14th Canadian Screen Awards in 2026.

The short film is available to watch on the National Film Board of Canada's official website and YouTube channel.
