= 2025 Toronto International Film Festival =

50th edition of Canadian film festival

- Opening film: John Candy: I Like Me by Colin Hanks
- Closing film: Peak Everything (Amour Apocalypse) by Anne Émond
- Location: Toronto, Ontario, Canada
- Founded: 1976
- Awards: Hamnet (People's Choice Award)
- Festival date: September 4–14, 2025
- Website: tiff.net/tiff

Toronto International Film Festival
- 2026 2024

The 50th annual Toronto International Film Festival was held from September 4 to 14, 2025. To mark the festival's 50th anniversary, the festival programmed a special series, The TIFF Story in 50 Films, to screen through June, July and August 2025 at the TIFF Lightbox.

The first programming announcement was that Colin Hanks' documentary film John Candy: I Like Me, about the actor John Candy, would open the festival. The full program was released on August 12.

The festival attracted controversy regarding its final programming decisions, specifically with respect to the inclusion, exclusion, and subsequent re-inclusion of the Israeli documentary The Road Between Us: The Ultimate Rescue, which depicts rescue efforts during the October 7 attacks in southern Israel.

Hamnet was the winner of the festival's People's Choice Award.

== Preparations ==
Preparations for the 2025 festival included the renewal of the festival's sponsorship deal with Rogers Communications, for three years through 2027. The sponsorship deal included a television special to air on Citytv.

Organizers also discussed the possibility of moving the festival a week later than its current early September placement, in response to industry feedback that the tight scheduling of the Venice, Telluride and Toronto film festivals presents a logistical challenge for filmmakers and industry professionals in travelling to all three festivals; however, moving the festival would have had a ripple effect on other Canadian film festivals, such as Cinéfest Sudbury, the Atlantic International Film Festival and the Calgary International Film Festival, which are scheduled overlapping with or very soon after TIFF, and would create some of the same logistical challenges. They ultimately decided to retain the existing schedule.

== Awards ==
=== Tribute Awards ===
The first Tribute Award recipients were announced on July 31, including Guillermo del Toro as recipient of the director award, Hikari as recipient of the emerging talent award, Jodie Foster as recipient of the Share Her Journey groundbreaker award, and Lee Byung-hun as recipient of a special tribute award. Brendan Fraser served as honorary chair of the event.

The remainder of the Tribute Award recipients were announced on August 21, including Catherine O'Hara as recipient of the Norman Jewison Award, Nina Hoss and Channing Tatum as recipients of the Performer Award, Kazu Hiro as winner of the Variety Artisan Award, Idris Elba as recipient of the Jeff Skoll Award in Impact Media, and filmmakers Zacharias Kunuk and Jafar Panahi as recipients of Special Tribute Awards.

=== Regular awards ===
The festival's regular awards for films, including the People's Choice Award, were announced at the conclusion of the festival.

At Cannes, the festival announced plans to introduce a new International People's Choice award, to be presented to the most popular film from outside North America along the same model as the existing People's Choice Award. A new juried award was also introduced for Best Animated Short Film, separately from the existing awards for Canadian and international short films.

| Award | Film | Director |
|---|---|---|
| People's Choice Award | Hamnet | Chloé Zhao |
| People's Choice Award, First Runner Up | Frankenstein | Guillermo del Toro |
| People's Choice Award, Second Runner Up | Wake Up Dead Man | Rian Johnson |
| International People's Choice Award | No Other Choice | Park Chan-wook |
| International People's Choice Award, First Runner Up | Sentimental Value | Joachim Trier |
| International People's Choice Award, Second Runner Up | Homebound | Neeraj Ghaywan |
| People's Choice Award: Documentaries | The Road Between Us: The Ultimate Rescue | Barry Avrich |
| Documentary, First Runner Up | EPiC: Elvis Presley in Concert | Baz Luhrmann |
| Documentary, Second Runner Up | You Had To Be There: How the Toronto Godspell Ignited the Comedy Revolution, Spread Love & Overalls, and Created a Community That Changed the World (In a Canadian Kind of Way) | Nick Davis |
| People's Choice Award: Midnight Madness | Nirvanna the Band the Show the Movie | Matt Johnson |
| Midnight Madness, First Runner Up | Obsession | Curry Barker |
| Midnight Madness, Second Runner Up | The Furious | Kenji Tanigaki |
| Platform Prize | To the Victory! | Valentyn Vasyanovych |
| Platform Prize, Honorable Mention | Hen (Kota) | György Pálfi |
| Best Canadian Feature Film | Wrong Husband (Uiksaringitara) | Zacharias Kunuk |
| Best Canadian Feature Film, Honorable Mention | There Are No Words | Min Sook Lee |
| Best Canadian Discovery | Blue Heron | Sophy Romvari |
| Best Canadian Discovery, Honorable Mention | 100 Sunset | Kunsang Kyirong |
| Best Animated Short Film | To the Woods (Une fugue) | Agnès Patron |
| Best Canadian Short Film | The Girl Who Cried Pearls (La jeune fille qui pleurait des perles) | Chris Lavis, Maciek Szczerbowski |
| Best Canadian Short Film, Honorable Mention | A Soft Touch | Heather Young |
| Best International Short Film | Talk Me | Joecar Hanna |
| Best International Short Film, Honorable Mention | Agapito | Arvin Belarmino, Kyla Danelle Romero |
| Vimeo Staff Pick | I Fear Blue Skies | Salar Pashtoonyar |
| FIPRESCI Award | Forastera | Lucía Aleñar Iglesias |
| NETPAC Award | In Search of the Sky (Vimukt) | Jitank Singh Gurjar |

== Program ==
=== Gala Presentations ===
Some gala presentations were announced on July 16. A more complete Gala lineup was announced on July 21, with one additional gala added on August 12.

| English title | Original title | Director(s) | Production country |
|---|---|---|---|
| Adulthood | | Alex Winter | United States |
| The Choral | | Nicholas Hytner | United Kingdom |
| Driver's Ed | | Bobby Farrelly | United States |
| Eleanor the Great | | Scarlett Johansson | United States |
| Eternity | | David Freyne | United States |
| Fuze | | David Mackenzie | United Kingdom |
| Glenrothan | | Brian Cox | United Kingdom |
| Good Fortune | | Aziz Ansari | United States |
| Hamnet | | Chloé Zhao | United Kingdom, United States |
| Homebound | | Neeraj Ghaywan | India |
| John Candy: I Like Me | | Colin Hanks | United States |
| Lilith Fair: Building a Mystery | | Ally Pankiw | Canada |
| No Other Choice | 어쩔수가없다 | Park Chan-wook | South Korea |
| Nuremberg | | James Vanderbilt | United States |
| Palestine 36 | | Annemarie Jacir | Palestine, United Kingdom, France, Denmark, Qatar, Saudi Arabia, Jordan |
| Peak Everything | Amour Apocalypse | Anne Émond | Canada |
| A Private Life | Vie Privée | Rebecca Zlotowski | France |
| Roofman | | Derek Cianfrance | United States |
| She's Got No Name | 酱园弄·悬案 | Peter Chan | China, Hong Kong |
| Sholay (1975) | | Ramesh Sippy | India |
| Swiped | | Rachel Lee Goldenberg | United States |
| Two Pianos | Deux Pianos | Arnaud Desplechin | France |

=== Special Presentations ===
The first five titles in the Special Presentations program were announced on June 26, 2025. Several more titles were announced on July 16, with a more complete lineup announced on July 21. Five further titles were announced on August 12.

| English title | Original title | Director(s) | Production country |
|---|---|---|---|
| & Sons | | Pablo Trapero | United Kingdom, Canada |
| Bad Apples | | Jonatan Etzler | United Kingdom, United States |
| Ballad of a Small Player | | Edward Berger | United Kingdom |
| California Schemin' | | James McAvoy | United Kingdom |
| Calle Malaga | | Maryam Touzani | Morocco, France, Spain, Germany, Belgium |
| The Captive | El cautivo | Alejandro Amenábar | Spain, Italy |
| Charlie Harper | | Tom Dean, Mac Eldridge | United States |
| Christy | | David Michôd | United States |
| Couture | | Alice Winocour | United States, France |
| The Christophers | | Steven Soderbergh | United States |
| Dead Man's Wire | | Gus Van Sant | United States |
| Degrassi: Whatever It Takes | | Lisa Rideout | Canada |
| Dog 51 | Chien 51 | Cédric Jimenez | France |
| Easy's Waltz | | Nic Pizzolatto | United States |
| EPiC: Elvis Presley in Concert | | Baz Luhrmann | Australia, United States |
| Eternal Return | | Yaniv Raz | United Kingdom, United States |
| The Fence | | Claire Denis | France |
| Frankenstein | | Guillermo del Toro | United States |
| Franz | | Agnieszka Holland | Czech Republic, Poland, Germany, France, Turkey |
| Good News | 굿뉴스 | Byun Sung-hyun | South Korea |
| Hedda | | Nia DaCosta | United States |
| If I Had Legs I'd Kick You | | Mary Bronstein | United States |
| It Was Just an Accident | یک تصادف ساده | Jafar Panahi | Iran, France, Luxembourg |
| It Would Be Night in Caracas | La Hija de la Española | Mariana Rondón, Marité Ugás | Mexico |
| Kokuho | 国宝 | Lee Sang-il | Japan |
| Ky Nam Inn | Quán Kỳ Nam | Leon Le | Vietnam |
| The Lost Bus | | Paul Greengrass | United States |
| Lovely Day | Mille secrets mille dangers | Philippe Falardeau | Canada |
| Meadowlarks | | Tasha Hubbard | Canada |
| Mile End Kicks | | Chandler Levack | Canada |
| Monkey in a Cage | Bandar | Anurag Kashyap | India |
| Nouvelle Vague | | Richard Linklater | France |
| A Pale View of Hills | | Kei Ishikawa | United Kingdom, Japan, Poland |
| A Poet | Un poeta | Simón Mesa Soto | Colombia |
| Poetic License | | Maude Apatow | United States |
| Primavera | | Damiano Michieletto | Italy, France |
| Project Y | 프로젝트 Y | Lee Hwan | South Korea |
| Rental Family | | Hikari | United States |
| Rose of Nevada | | Mark Jenkin | United Kingdom |
| Sacrifice | | Romain Gavras | United Kingdom, Greece |
| Scarlet | 果てしなきスカーレット | Mamoru Hosoda | Japan |
| The Secret Agent | O Agente Secreto | Kleber Mendonça Filho | Brazil, France, Netherlands, Germany |
| Sentimental Value | Affeksjonsverdi | Joachim Trier | Norway, France, Denmark, Germany, Sweden, United Kingdom |
| Silent Friend | Stille Freundin | Ildikó Enyedi | Germany, France, Hungary |
| Sirāt | | Oliver Laxe | France, Spain |
| The Smashing Machine | | Benny Safdie | United States |
| Sound of Falling | In Die Sonne Schauen | Mascha Schilinski | Germany |
| Steal Away | | Clement Virgo | Canada, Belgium |
| The Testament of Ann Lee | | Mona Fastvold | United Kingdom |
| Three Goodbyes | Tre Ciotole | Isabel Coixet | Italy, Spain |
| Train Dreams | | Clint Bentley | United States |
| Tuner | | Daniel Roher | United States |
| The Ugly | 얼굴 | Yeon Sang-ho | South Korea |
| The Voice of Hind Rajab | | Kaouther Ben Hania | Tunisia, France |
| Wake Up Dead Man | | Rian Johnson | United States |
| The Wizard of the Kremlin | Le Mage du Kremlin | Olivier Assayas | France |
| Wrong Husband | Uiksaringitara | Zacharias Kunuk | Canada |
| You Had To Be There: How the Toronto Godspell Ignited the Comedy Revolution, Spread Love & Overalls, and Created a Community That Changed the World (In a Canadian Kind of Way) | | Nick Davis | United States |

=== Centrepiece ===
Titles in Centrepiece were announced on August 5.

| English title | Original title | Director(s) | Production country |
|---|---|---|---|
| Arco | | Ugo Bienvenu | France |
| Barrio Triste | | Stillz | Colombia, United States |
| Blood Lines | | Gail Maurice | Canada |
| Blue Heron | | Sophy Romvari | Canada, Hungary |
| Blue Moon | | Richard Linklater | United States, Ireland |
| The Blue Trail | O Último Azul | Gabriel Mascaro | Brazil, Mexico, Chile, Netherlands |
| Carolina Caroline | | Adam Carter Rehmeier | United States |
| The Condor Daughter | La Hija Cóndor | Álvaro Olmos Torrico | Bolivia, Peru, Uruguay |
| The Cost of Heaven | Gagne ton ciel | Mathieu Denis | Canada |
| Dandelion's Odyssey | Planètes | Momoko Seto | France, Belgium |
| Diya | | Achille Ronaimou | Chad, France, Germany, Côte d’Ivoire |
| Duse | | Pietro Marcello | France, Italy |
| Eagles of the Republic | | Tarik Saleh | Sweden, France, Denmark, Finland, Germany |
| Erupcja | | Pete Ohs | United States, Poland |
| Exit 8 | 8番出口 | Genki Kawamura | Japan |
| Follies | Folichonneries | Eric K. Boulianne | Canada |
| The Fox King | | Woo Ming Jin | Malaysia, Indonesia |
| Girl | 女孩 | Shu Qi | Taiwan |
| Good Boy | | Jan Komasa | Poland, United Kingdom |
| Hamlet | | Aneil Karia | United Kingdom |
| Honey Bunch | | Madeleine Sims-Fewer, Dusty Mancinelli | Canada |
| I Swear | | Kirk Jones | Scotland |
| In Search of the Sky | Vimukt | Jitank Singh Gurjar | India |
| Irkalla: Gilgamesh's Dream | | Mohamed Jabarah Al-Daradji | Iraq, United Arab Emirates, France, United Kingdom, Qatar, Saudi Arabia |
| The Last One for the Road | Le città di pianura | Francesco Sossai | Italy, Germany |
| The Last Viking | Den Sidste Viking | Anders Thomas Jensen | Denmark, Sweden |
| Left-Handed Girl | 左撇子女孩 | Shih-Ching Tsou | Taiwan, France, United States, United Kingdom |
| Little Amélie or the Character of Rain | Amélie et la métaphysique des tubes | Maïlys Vallade and Liane-Cho Han | France |
| The Little Sister | La Petite Dernière | Hafsia Herzi | France, Germany |
| The Love That Remains | Ástin Sem Eftir Er | Hlynur Pálmason | Iceland, Denmark, Sweden, France |
| Lucky Lu | 幸福之路 | Lloyd Lee Choi | Canada, United States |
| Mama | | Or Sinai | Israel, Poland, Italy |
| Memory of Princess Mumbi | | Damien Hauser | Kenya, Switzerland, Saudi Arabia |
| Milk Teeth | | Mihai Mincan | Romania, France, Denmark, Greece, Bulgaria |
| Miroirs No. 3 | | Christian Petzold | Germany |
| Motor City | | Potsy Ponciroli | United States |
| My Father's Shadow | | Akinola Davies Jr. | United Kingdom, Nigeria |
| The Mysterious Gaze of the Flamingo | La misteriosa mirada del flamenco | Diego Céspedes | Chile, France |
| Nimrods (premiered as New Years Rev) | | Lee Kirk | United States |
| Nomad Shadow | | Eimi Imanishi | United States, Spain, France |
| Olmo | | Fernando Eimbcke | United States, Mexico |
| Orphan | Árva | László Nemes | Hungary, France, Germany, United Kingdom |
| Palimpsest: the Story of a Name | 隱蹟之書：重寫自我 | Mary Stephen | France, Hong Kong, Taiwan |
| The President's Cake | مملكة القصب | Hasan Hadi | Iraq, Qatar, United States |
| Renoir | ルノワール | Chie Hayakawa | Japan, France, Singapore, Philippines, Indonesia, Qatar |
| Saipan | | Lisa Barros D'Sa, Glenn Leyburn | Ireland, United Kingdom |
| Space Cadet | | Kid Koala | Canada |
| The Sun Rises on Us All | 日掛中天 | Cai Shangjun | China |
| Two Prosecutors | Два прокурора | Sergei Loznitsa | France, Germany, Netherlands, Latvia, Romania, Lithuania |
| Under the Same Sun | Bajo el mismo sol | Ulises Porra | Dominican Republic, Spain |
| Unidentified | | Haifaa al-Mansour | Saudi Arabia |
| A Useful Ghost | ผีใช้ได้ค่ะ | Ratchapoom Boonbunchachoke | Thailand, France, Singapore, Germany |
| Wasteman | | Cal McMau | United Kingdom |
| Whitetail | | Nanouk Leopold | Netherlands, Belgium, Ireland |
| Youngblood | | Hubert Davis | Canada |

=== TIFF Docs ===
Documentaries were announced on August 6.

On August 13, it was revealed that one additional documentary, Barry Avrich's The Road Between Us: The Ultimate Rescue, had been planned for the festival but was excluded from the lineup announcement as the producers had not provided adequate proof that they had the proper legal clearances for all footage used in the film. The film was readded to the festival lineup on August 14, after the festival and the film's producers reached an agreement about the outstanding concerns.

| English title | Original title | Director(s) | Production country |
|---|---|---|---|
| Aki | | Darlene Naponse | Canada |
| The Balloonists | | John Dower | United States, United Kingdom, Austria |
| Below the Clouds | Sotto le nuvole | Gianfranco Rosi | Italy |
| Canceled: The Paula Deen Story | | Billy Corben | United States |
| Cover-Up | | Laura Poitras and Mark Obenhaus | United States |
| The Eyes of Ghana | | Ben Proudfoot | United States |
| Flana | فلانة | Zahraa Ghandour | Iraq, France, Qatar |
| Landmarks | Nuestra tierra | Lucrecia Martel | Argentina, United States, Mexico, France, Denmark, Netherlands |
| A Life Illuminated | | Tasha Van Zandt | United States |
| Love+War | | E. Chai Vasarhelyi and Jimmy Chin | United States |
| Modern Whore | | Nicole Bazuin | Canada |
| Ni-Naadamaadiz: Red Power Rising | | Shane Belcourt | Canada |
| Nuns vs. The Vatican | | Lorena Luciano | United States |
| Orwell: 2+2=5 | | Raoul Peck | United States, France |
| Powwow People | | Sky Hopinka | United States |
| Put Your Soul on Your Hand and Walk | لماء ضع على يدك وامشي | Sepideh Farsi | France, Palestine, Iran |
| The Road Between Us: The Ultimate Rescue | | Barry Avrich | Canada |
| A Simple Soldier | Простий солдат | Juan Camilo Cruz and Artem Ryzhykov | Ukraine |
| Still Single | | Jamal Burger and Jukan Tateisi | Canada |
| The Tale of Silyan | Силјан | Tamara Kotevska | North Macedonia |
| There Are No Words | | Min Sook Lee | Canada |
| True North | | Michèle Stephenson | Canada, United States |
| While the Green Grass Grows: A Diary in Seven Parts | | Peter Mettler | Canada, Switzerland |
| Whistle | | Christopher Nelius | Australia |

=== Discovery ===
Discovery titles were announced on July 23.

| English title | Original title | Director(s) | Production country |
|---|---|---|---|
| 100 Sunset | | Kunsang Kyirong | Canada |
| Amoeba | 核 | Siyou Tan | Singapore, Netherlands, France, Spain, South Korea |
| As We Breathe | Aldığımız Nefes | Şeyhmus Altun | Turkey, Denmark |
| Babystar | | Joscha Bongard | Germany |
| Bayaan | | Bikas Mishra | India |
| Dinner with Friends | | Sasha Leigh Henry | Canada |
| Egghead Republic | | Pella Kågerman, Hugo Lilja | Sweden |
| Forastera | | Lucía Aleñar Iglesias | Spain, Italy, Sweden |
| Ghost School | | Seemab Gul | Pakistan |
| Julian | | Cato Kusters | Belgium, Netherlands |
| Laundry | | Zamo Mkhwanazi | Switzerland, South Africa |
| Little Lorraine | | Andy Hines | Canada |
| Maddie's Secret | | John Early | United States |
| The Man in My Basement | | Nadia Latif | United Kingdom, United States |
| Mārama | | Taratoa Stappard | New Zealand |
| Nika and Madison | | Eva Thomas | Canada |
| November | Noviembre | Tomás Corredor | Colombia, Mexico, Brazil, Norway |
| Oca | | Karla Badillo | Mexico, Argentina |
| Our Father | Oče naš | Goran Stanković | Serbia, Italy, Croatia, North Macedonia, Montenegro, Bosnia and Herzegovina |
| Out Standing | Seule au front | Mélanie Charbonneau | Canada |
| Retreat | | Ted Evans | United Kingdom |
| Sink | | Zain Duraie | Jordan, Saudi Arabia, Qatar, France |
| The Son and the Sea | | Stroma Cairns | United Kingdom |

=== Platform ===
The Platform Prize lineup and jury were announced on July 22. The jury consisted of filmmakers Carlos Marqués-Marcet and Chloé Robichaud, and actress Marianne Jean-Baptiste.

| English title | Original title | Director(s) | Production country |
|---|---|---|---|
| At the Place of Ghosts | Sk+te’kmujue’katik | Bretten Hannam | Canada, Belgium |
| Between Dreams and Hope | میان رویا و امید | Farnoosh Samadi | Iran |
| Bouchra | | Orian Barki, Meriem Bennani | Italy, Morocco, United States |
| The Currents | Las corrientes | Milagros Mumenthaler | Switzerland, Argentina |
| Hen | Kota | György Pálfi | Germany, Greece, Hungary |
| Nino | | Pauline Loquès | France |
| Steve | | Tim Mielants | Ireland, United Kingdom |
| To the Victory! | За Перемогу! | Valentyn Vasyanovych | Ukraine, Lithuania |
| Winter of the Crow | | Kasia Adamik | Poland, Luxembourg, United Kingdom |
| The World of Love | 세계의 주인 | Yoon Ga-eun | South Korea |

=== Midnight Madness ===
The Midnight Madness slate was announced on July 24.

| English title | Original title | Director(s) | Production country |
|---|---|---|---|
| Dead Lover | | Grace Glowicki | Canada |
| Dust Bunny | | Bryan Fuller | United States |
| Fuck My Son! | | Todd Rohal | United States |
| The Furious | 火遮眼 | Kenji Tanigaki | Hong Kong |
| Junk World | | Takahide Hori | Japan |
| Karmadonna | Karmadona | Aleksandar Radivojević | Serbia |
| The Napa Boys | | Nick Corirossi | United States |
| Nirvanna the Band the Show the Movie | | Matt Johnson | Canada |
| Normal | | Ben Wheatley | United States, Canada |
| Obsession | | Curry Barker | United States |

=== Primetime ===
Primetime titles were announced on August 7.

| English title | Original title | Director(s) | Production country |
|---|---|---|---|
| Black Rabbit | | Zach Baylin, Kate Susman | United States |
| Gandhi | | Sameer Nair, Hansal Mehta | India |
| The Lowdown | | Sterlin Harjo | United States |
| Origin: The Story of the Basketball Africa League | | Richard Brown, Tebogo Malope | Rwanda, United Kingdom, United States |
| Portobello | | Marco Bellocchio | Italy, France |
| Reunion | | William Mager, Luke Snellin | United Kingdom |
| Rise of the Raven | Hunyadi | Balázs Lengyel, Robert Dornhelm | Hungary, Austria, Germany |
| A Sámi Wedding | | Åse Kathrin Vuolab, Pål Jackman | Norway |
| The Savage | | Houman Seyyedi | Iran |
| Wayward | | Mae Martin, Ryan Scott | Canada |

=== Short Cuts ===
Short Cuts titles were announced on August 7. The jury for the short film awards consisted of cinematographer Ashley Iris Gill, actor Connor Jessup, and Annecy International Animation Film Festival director Marcel Jean.

| English title | Original title | Director(s) | Production country |
|---|---|---|---|
| Agapito | | Arvin Belarmino, Kyla Danelle Romero | Philippines |
| Ali | | Adnan Al Rajeev | Bangladesh, Philippines |
| All the Empty Rooms | | Joshua Seftel | United States |
| Ambush | Kameen | Yassmina Karajah | Canada, Jordan |
| Arguments in Favour of Love | | Gabriel Abrantes | Portugal |
| Asparagus Bear | Medo u šparogama | Ivan Grgur | Croatia |
| Bots | | Rich Williamson | Canada |
| The Contestant | | Patrick Xavier Bresnan | United States |
| The Death of the Fish | La Mort du poisson | Eva Lusbaronian | France |
| Demons | | Kelly Fyffe-Marshall | Canada |
| Dish Pit | | Anna Hopkins | Canada |
| Disc | | Blake Winston Rice | United States |
| Divers | | Geordie Wood | United States |
| Dust to Dreams | | Idris Elba | Nigeria |
| Earworm | Öronmask | Patrik Eklund | Sweden |
| Fiction Contract | | Carolyn Lazard | United States |
| The Girl Who Cried Pearls | La jeune fille qui pleurait des perles | Chris Lavis, Maciek Szczerbowski | Canada |
| Healer | | Chelsea McMullan | Canada |
| I Fear Blue Skies | | Salar Pashtoonyar | Canada |
| I'm Glad You're Dead Now | | Tawfeek Barhom | France, Greece, Palestine |
| Jazz Infernal | | Will Niava | Canada |
| Karupy | | Kalainithan Kalaichelvan | Canada |
| Klee | | Gavin Baird | Canada |
| Marriaginalia | | Hannah Cheesman | Canada |
| More Than Happy | | Wei Keong Tan | Singapore |
| Niimi | | Dana Solomon | Canada |
| The Non-Actor | | Eliza Barry Callahan | United States |
| Not Scared Just Sad | مش خايفة ، حزينة بسّ | Isabelle Mecattaf | Lebanon, Bulgaria |
| Once in a Body | Una vez en un cuerpo | María Cristina Pérez González | Colombia, United States |
| Permanent Guest | مستقل مہمان | Sana Zahra Jafri | Pakistan |
| Pink Light | | Harrison Browne | Canada |
| Poster Boy | | India Opzoomer | Canada |
| Praying Mantis | 螳螂 | Joe Hsieh | Taiwan, Hong Kong |
| Quietness | Quietud | Gonçalo Almeida | Spain |
| Ramón Who Speaks to Ghosts | | Shervin Kermani | Canada |
| ripe | chín | Solara Thanh Bình Đặng | Canada, Vietnam |
| Sea Star | | Tyler McKenzie Evans | Canada |
| A Small Fiction of My Mother in Beijing | | Dorothy Sing Zhang | China |
| A Soft Touch | | Heather Young | Canada |
| A South-Facing Window | Урагшаа харсан цонх | Lkhagvadulam Purev-Ochir | France, Mongolia |
| Talk Me | | Joecar Hanna | Spain, United States |
| Thanks to Meet You! | | Richard Hunter | United Kingdom |
| To the Woods | Une fugue | Agnès Patron | France |
| UM | | Nieto | France |
| The Veil | O Véu | Gabriel Motta | Brazil |
| Water Girl | Fille de l'eau | Sandra Desmaizières | France, Netherlands, Portugal |
| What We Leave Behind | Ce qu'on laisse derrière | Alexandra Myotte, Jean-Sébastien Hamel | Canada |
| Year of the Dragon | | Giran Findlay Liu | Canada |

=== Wavelengths ===
Wavelengths titles were announced on August 8.

| English title | Original title | Director(s) | Production country |
|---|---|---|---|
| 09/05/1982 | | Jorge Caballero, Camilo Restrepo | Spain, Mexico |
| Aftertide | | Kaiwen Ren | United States |
| BLKNWS: Terms & Conditions | | Kahlil Joseph | United States |
| Conditio Humana | | Friedl vom Gröller | Austria |
| Cairo Streets | | Abdellah Taïa | France |
| Conference | | Björn Kämmerer | Austria |
| Copper | Cobre | Nicolás Pereda | Canada, Mexico |
| Daria's Night Flowers | گل‌های شب ِدریا | Maryam Tafakory | France, Iran, United Kingdom |
| Disappeared | | Sohrab Hura | India, Nepal |
| Dry Leaf | ხმელი ფოთოლი | Alexandre Koberidze | Germany, Georgia |
| Felt | | Blake Williams | Canada |
| From My Cloud | 구름으로부터 | Minjung Kim | South Korea |
| I Saw the Face of God in the Jet Wash | | Mark Jenkin | United Kingdom |
| In Transit | En traversée | Vadim Kostrov | France |
| It's So Beautiful Here | | Basma al-Sharif | Palestine |
| Land of Barbar | بلاد البربر | Fredj Moussa | Tunisia |
| Levers | | Rhayne Vermette | Canada |
| Magellan | Magalhães | Lav Diaz | Portugal, Spain, Philippines, Taiwan |
| Map of Traces | 記憶座標 | Chan Hau Chun | Hong Kong |
| Mare's Nest | | Ben Rivers | France, United Kingdom, Canada |
| Morgenkreis | | Basma al-Sharif | Canada, United Arab Emirates |
| Rojo Žalia Blau | | Viktoria Schmid | Austria |
| The Seasons | As Estações | Maureen Fazendeiro | Portugal, France, Spain, Austria |
| Slightest Pretense | わずかな見せかけ | Eri Saito | Japan |
| Ten Mornings, Ten Evenings and One Horizon | | Tomonari Nishikawa | Japan |
| With Hasan in Gaza | مع حسن في غزّة | Kamal Aljafari | Palestine, Germany, Switzerland, France, Qatar |

=== TIFF Classics ===
Classics titles were announced on August 8.

| English title | Original title | Director(s) | Production country |
|---|---|---|---|
| Aniki-Bóbó | | Manoel de Oliveira | Portugal |
| The Arch | 董夫人 | Tang Shu Shuen | Hong Kong |
| Bashu, the Little Stranger | باشو غریبه کوچک | Bahram Beyzai | Iran |
| Days and Nights in the Forest | Araṇyēra Dinarātri | Satyajit Ray | India |
| Jaws | | Steven Spielberg | United States |
| Nadja | | Michael Almereyda | United States |

=== Festival Street ===
Free public outdoor screenings of classic films with production or cast connections to films in the official program, at David Pecaut Square.

| English title | Original title | Director(s) | Production country |
|---|---|---|---|
| Before Sunrise | | Richard Linklater | United States, Austria |
| Best in Show | | Christopher Guest | United States |
| Bill and Ted's Excellent Adventure | | Stephen Herek | United States |
| The Goonies | | Richard Donner | United States |
| High Fidelity | | Stephen Frears | United Kingdom, United States |
| Lady Bird | | Greta Gerwig | United States |
| Marie Antoinette | | Sofia Coppola | United States |
| Moonstruck | | Norman Jewison | United States |
| Sound of Metal | | Darius Marder | United States |
| Uncle Buck | | John Hughes | United States |

== Film market ==
As in recent years, the festival also included market screenings for film industry, not open to the general public. This was in preparation for the official launch of a full film market at the 2026 Toronto International Film Festival.

=== Industry Selects ===
| English title | Original title | Director(s) | Production country |
|---|---|---|---|
| Dolph: Unbreakable | | Andrew Holmes | Canada, United States, Sweden |
| Falling | | Colin Krisel, James Krisel | United Kingdom, United States |
| Find Your Friends | | Izabel Pakzad | United States |
| Hana Korea | | Frederik Solberg | Denmark, South Korea |
| Holy Days | | Nathalie Boltt | Canada, New Zealand |
| Killing Castro | | Eif Rivera | United States |
| On the End | | Ari Selinger | United States |
| Stitches | | Shirley Frimpong-Manso | Nigeria |
| Straight Circle | | Oscar Hudson | United States, United Kingdom, South Africa |
| A Survivor's Tale | | Micha Wald | Belgium, France |

=== Market Screenings ===
| English title | Original title | Director(s) | Production country |
|---|---|---|---|
| The Bad Boy and Me 2 | | Justin Wu | United States |
| Bam Bam | | Tolulope Itegboje | Nigeria |
| Between Borders | | Mark Freiburger | United States |
| Broken English | | Jane Pollard, Iain Forsyth | United Kingdom |
| Butterfly on a Wheel | | Trevor Morris | Canada |
| Closure | | Will Wernick | United States |
| Dolly | | Rod Blackhurst | United States |
| The Eagle Obsession | | Jeffrey Morris | United States |
| Elisa | Elisa — Io la volevo uccidere | Leonardo Di Costanzo | Italy, Switzerland |
| Fanon | | Jean-Claude Barny | France, Luxembourg, Canada |
| Gara's Return | | Gisberg Bermudez | United States |
| Gill | 아가미 | Ahn Jae-huun | South Korea |
| The Great Warning | | Juan Carlos Salas Tamez | Mexico |
| Guac: A Portrait of Love, Joy and Tragedy | | Mike Bickerton | United States |
| The Holy Boy | | Paolo Strippoli | Italy, Slovenia |
| Ish | | Imran Paretta | United Kingdom |
| Jacked | | John Fucile | Canada, United States |
| Jersey Boy | | Jaskaran Singh | Canada, United States |
| The Last Supper | | Mauro Borelli | United States |
| Late Fame | | Kent Jones | United States |
| The Lightning Code | | Kali Bailey | United States |
| Little Angels | | Dean Cain | United States |
| Mother's Love | | Omotola Jalade Ekeinde | Nigeria |
| Phoenix Fury | | Ifeoma Nkiruka Chukwuogo | Nigeria |
| Ralph's Perfekt Christmas | | Mary McLaren, Matthew Bellamy | United States |
| Son of Sara: Volume 1 | | Houston Bone | Canada |
| The Road to Sydney | | Benito Bautista | Canada, United States |
| The Theft of the Caravaggio | | Joshua Cassar Gaspar | United Kingdom, Malta |
| The Yeti | | William Pisciotta, Gene Gallerano | United States |

== The TIFF Story in 50 Films ==
To mark the festival's 50th anniversary, the festival programmed a special series, The TIFF Story in 50 Films, to screen through June, July and August 2025 at the TIFF Lightbox. The program highlighted 50 past Canadian and international films that have played a significant role in the festival's story, such as by helping to define the festival's vision or its status as a global platform and tastemaker.

| English title | Original title | Director(s) | Production country |
|---|---|---|---|
| After Life | ワンダフルライフ | Hirokazu Kore-eda | Japan |
| Antonia's Line | | Marleen Gorris | Netherlands |
| Away from Her | | Sarah Polley | Canada |
| The Big Chill | | Lawrence Kasdan | United States |
| Boogie Nights | | Paul Thomas Anderson | United States |
| The Boy and the Heron | 君たちはどう生きるか | Hayao Miyazaki | Japan |
| Braindead | | Peter Jackson | New Zealand |
| A Brighter Summer Day | 牯嶺街少年殺人事件 | Edward Yang | Taiwan |
| Brothers | Brødre | Susanne Bier | Denmark |
| Cave of Forgotten Dreams | | Werner Herzog | Canada, France, Germany, United Kingdom, United States |
| Dead Ringers | | David Cronenberg | Canada, United States |
| Drugstore Cowboy | | Gus Van Sant | United States |
| Eve's Bayou | | Kasi Lemmons | United States |
| The Fabelmans | | Steven Spielberg | United States |
| Harlan County, USA | | Barbara Kopple | United States |
| Highway 61 | | Bruce McDonald | Canada |
| I Am Not Your Negro | | Raoul Peck | United States |
| In the Cut | | Jane Campion | United Kingdom, United States |
| Jallikattu | | Lijo Jose Pellissery | India |
| Jennifer's Body | | Karyn Kusama | United States |
| Kanehsatake: 270 Years of Resistance | | Alanis Obomsawin | Canada |
| The Killer | 喋血雙雄 | John Woo | Hong Kong |
| Lady Macbeth | | William Oldroyd | United Kingdom |
| Leaving Las Vegas | | Mike Figgis | United States |
| Let Each One Go Where He May | | Ben Russell | United States |
| Love in the Time of Hysteria | Sólo con tu pareja | Alfonso Cuarón | Mexico |
| Maelström | | Denis Villeneuve | Canada |
| Maqbool | | Vishal Bhardwaj | India |
| Matador | | Pedro Almodóvar | Spain |
| Memories of Murder | 살인의 추억 | Bong Joon Ho | South Korea |
| My Beautiful Laundrette | | Stephen Frears | United Kingdom |
| My Winnipeg | | Guy Maddin | Canada |
| Near Dark | | Kathryn Bigelow | United States |
| Next of Kin | | Atom Egoyan | Canada |
| Phoenix | | Christian Petzold | Germany |
| The Princess Bride | | Rob Reiner | United States |
| The Raid: Redemption | | Gareth Evans | Indonesia |
| Revenge | | Coralie Fargeat | France |
| Rhymes for Young Ghouls | | Jeff Barnaby | Canada |
| Roger & Me | | Michael Moore | United States |
| Saint Maud | | Rose Glass | United Kingdom |
| The Secret in Their Eyes | El secreto de sus ojos | Juan José Campanella | Argentina, Spain |
| Sexy Beast | | Jonathan Glazer | United Kingdom, Spain |
| The Shawshank Redemption | | Frank Darabont | United States |
| Slumdog Millionaire | | Danny Boyle | United Kingdom |
| A Soldier's Story | | Norman Jewison | United States |
| Thank You for Smoking | | Jason Reitman | United States |
| Viva Riva! | | Djo Tunda Wa Munga | Democratic Republic of the Congo |
| Water | Jal | Deepa Mehta | Canada, United States, India |
| Whale Rider | | Niki Caro | New Zealand, Germany |

== Controversy ==
On August 13, 2025 (a month before the festival), organizers of the festival withdrew the invitation to screen the Israeli documentary The Road Between Us: The Ultimate Rescue, which depicts rescue efforts by retired Major General Noam Tibon during the October 7 attacks in southern Israel. The cancellation cited a copyright claim, stating that the filmmakers did not obtain permission to use video footage recorded by Hamas during the attacks and concerns over possible disruptions as the reason for the decision. Critics noted that Hamas is designated as a terrorist organization by the Government of Canada, and argued that the decision effectively required Israeli filmmakers to seek approval from a group officially recognized as such in order to depict these events. Festival organizers defended their decision noting that they need to protect the festival from any potential copyright issues, and they impose this requirement on all films exhibited at the festival to either show copyright clearances or provide an indemnity to protect the festival from legal liability in the event that a copyright lawsuit is launched over the film's screening.

On August 14, 2025, following public criticism and discussions with the filmmakers, the organizers reversed their decision and reinstated the documentary in the festival's lineup.

== Canada's Top Ten ==
The festival's annual Canada's Top Ten list, selecting the ten best Canadian feature and short films of the year, was announced on January 6, 2026.

=== Feature films ===
- Agatha's Almanac — Amalie Atkins
- At the Place of Ghosts (Sk+te'kmujue'katik) — Bretten Hannam
- Blue Heron — Sophy Romvari
- Follies (Folichonneries) — Eric K. Boulianne
- Mile End Kicks — Chandler Levack
- Nirvanna the Band the Show the Movie — Matt Johnson
- Space Cadet — Kid Koala
- The Things You Kill — Alireza Khatami
- Tuner — Daniel Roher
- Wrong Husband (Uiksaringtara) — Zacharias Kunuk

=== Short films ===
- Ambush (Kameen) — Yassmina Karajah
- The Girl Who Cried Pearls — Chris Lavis, Maciek Szczerbowski
- Jazz Infernal — Will Niava
- Lloyd Wong, Unfinished — Lesley Loksi Chan
- Klee — Gavin Baird
- La Mayordomía — Martin Edralin
- Pidikwe (Rumble) — Caroline Monnet
- Ramon Who Speaks to Ghosts — Shervin Kermani
- Ripe (chín) — Solara Thanh Bình Đặng
- A Soft Touch — Heather Young
