= Ann Freedman =

American art dealer

- Born: Ann Louise Fertig c. 1949
- Education: Washington University in St. Louis (BFA)
- Occupations: Art dealer; gallery owner
- Years active: 1977 - present
- Known for: Knoedler Gallery director

Ann Freedman (née Fertig, born c. 1949) is an American art dealer and gallery owner. She was previously director of the now-defunct Knoedler Gallery in New York City; she resigned in 2009 after 31 years working for the gallery during a large-scale forgery scandal.

Referred to as a "leading New York gallerist" by the New York Times, she was prominently featured in the Netflix documentary Made You Look: A True Story About Fake Art by documentary filmmaker Barry Avrich. In 2011, Freedman opened her own gallery called FreedmanArt on Manhattan's Upper East Side, amid numerous lawsuits regarding her central role in the Knoedler forgery case. The first show, titled "Embracing Circles: 1959–1960", featured work by Jules Olitski.

== Biography ==
Ann Louise Fertig was born circa 1949 to Hilda and Felix C. Fertig, a real-estate executive from Scarsdale, New York. She attended Green Acres Elementary School, and later graduated from Scarsdale High School. She attended university at Washington University in St. Louis as a painting major, earning a BFA in 1971.

She first got a job at the gallery of André Emmerich working as a receptionist, before starting at Knoedler as a salesperson in 1977. Freedman eventually became director and was referred to by author Anthony M. Amore as "the famous face of Knoedler".

When many works Freedman had acquired for the gallery turned out to be forgeries, Freedman was removed from her post and eventually resigned in 2009. In 2011, an entanglement with a forgery business was revealed in the press, but Freedman, denied knowledge of any forgeries. A lawsuit against Freedman filed by Italian businessman Domenico De Sole and his wife Eleanore for selling them a fake Rothko for $8.3 million was settled in 2016. In 2017, Freedman settled the tenth and last of the lawsuits of the Knoedler affair. Her defense remained that, she was unaware that the paintings - bought through her friend from an untraced source - were forged.

Freedman participated in the documentary Made You Look about the experience in 2020, directed by Barry Avrich.

She represents American painter Frank Stella.

== Personal life ==
Freedman became engaged to Robert Lawrence Freedman, son of Herbert J. Freedman, in 1972. Their engagement was announced by The New York Times in October of that year. They married December 24, 1972.

Freedman's mother Hilda died in November 1997. Her father Felix died on April 21, 2002.

== Filmography ==
Film
Year	Title	Film type	Role
2020	Made You Look: A True Story About Fake Art	Documentary	Self
2019	Driven to Abstraction	Documentary	Self
