= Our Father (disambiguation) =

"Our Father" is the opening phrase of the Lord's Prayer.

Our Father may also refer to:

== Film and television ==
- Our Father (1953 film), a Mexican drama film
- Our Father (1993 film), a Finnish drama film
- Abouna (film), a 2002 Chadian film with the English-language title Our Father
- Our Father (2015 film), a British short film
- Our Father (2016 film), an Israeli drama film
- Our Father (2021 film), an American dark comedy film
- Our Father (2022 film), an American Netflix documentary film about notorious fertility doctor Donald Cline
- Our Father (2025 film), a drama film
- "Our Father" (Heroes), a 2008 episode of the TV series Heroes
- "Our Father" (Dexter), a 2008 episode of the TV series Dexter

== Other ==
- Our Father (cantata), a 1901 setting of the Lord’s Prayer to music
- "Our Father", a song by Pharrell from his debut studio album In My Mind

== See also ==
- Our Fathers (disambiguation)
- Padre nuestro (disambiguation)
- God the Father
