= Cameron Bailey =

Canadian film critic and film festival programmer

- Bailey in 2026
- Born: London, England
- Education: University of Western Ontario
- Occupations: Film critic, festival programmer

Cameron Bailey is a Canadian film critic and festival programmer, who is the CEO of the Toronto International Film Festival (TIFF).

In August 2025, during his tenure as CEO, TIFF made the contentious decision to rescind its invitation to screen the documentary The Road Between Us: The Ultimate Rescue, citing legal clearance requirements for footage, including material filmed by Hamas during the October 7 attacks. However, the film was later re-invited to the festival.

== Early life and education ==
Born in London, England, to parents from Barbados, Cameron Bailey spent his early childhood in Saint James, Barbados, before moving to Canada with his family at the age of eight.

He attended the University of Western Ontario.

== Career ==
Bailey worked as a film reviewer for Now, Canada AM, CBC Radio One, Take One and other publications before joining the Toronto International Film Festival as a programmer.

He co-wrote the screenplay for the 1997 film The Planet of Junior Brown with Clement Virgo, and wrote and directed the short film Hotel Saudade.

In 2012, Bailey was named artistic director of the Toronto International Film Festival.

He participated in the 2015 edition of Canada Reads, where he advocated for Kim Thúy's novel Ru. Ru ultimately won the competition.

In 2018, Bailey was promoted to the newly-created position of co-head of the Toronto International Film Festival. In November 2021 , following the resignation of co-head Joana Vicente, Bailey was named the festival's chief executive director.

== Recognition and awards ==
In 2024, he was the recipient of a Black Academy Legacy Award.

== Controversy ==
In August 2025, TIFF withdrew its invitation for Barry Avrich's documentary The Road Between Us: The Ultimate Rescue, which chronicles Israeli Major General Noam Tibon's efforts during the October 7 attacks to save his son Amir and family who were in their safe room on Kibbutz Nahal Oz during the attacks.

TIFF stated that the filmmakers had not met its "general requirements for inclusion," specifically legal clearance of all footage, including sensitive material recorded and livestreamed by Hamas, which the festival said posed legal and security risks. In response, filmmakers accused TIFF of censorship; some critics characterized the decision as politically motivated. Bailey said it was "unequivocally false" that the film was being censored. The film was re-invited to the festival as an official selection.

The film won the TIFF People's Choice Award for Documentary.

== Selected publications ==
- Bailey, Cameron (Winter 1990). "A Cinema of Duty: The Films of Jennifer Hodge de Silva". CineAction (23): 4–12.
  - Reprinted in Armatage, Kay; Banning, Kass; Longfellow, Brenda; Marchessault, Janine, eds. (1999). Gendering the Nation: Canadian Women's Cinema. Toronto: University of Toronto. pp. 94–108.
