= Emilia Conde =

Puerto Rican singer (c. 1930/1–1998)

- Born: September 2, 1930 or 1931; Yauco, Puerto Rico
- Died: February 28, 1998 (aged 66 or 67) Palm Beach, Florida
- Genres: Latin, Classical, Pop, Bolero, Rock

Emilia Conde (née Rodriguez, September 2, 1930 or 1931 – February 28, 1998) was a Puerto Rican singer, pianist, guitarist, and composer.

== Biography ==
Conde was born in Yauco, Puerto Rico to parents Juan Rodriguez and Marina Pacheco. Her father died when she was very young, and she was raised by her great-aunt, Leonor Damiani-Dionisi.

At a young age, she studied piano with Rosita Escalona de Nin, and performed her first piano recital at age nine. Her musicianship earned her a Puerto Rican government scholarship to attend the Eastman School of Music in Rochester, New York. As a student, she studied classical piano, harmony, theory and voice, and was awarded a Bachelor of Music with Distinction in 1953.

Conde pursued a singing career as a protégé of Pablo Casals, and was further encouraged by musicians such as José Iturbi and Alexander Schneider, who recognized her talent. She further developed her singing voice, taught by Maria Ester Robles, Dolf Swing, and Carlo Menotti, who remained her voice coach throughout her life. In Madrid, she studied guitar, and would often perform her own guitar accompaniments in her songs.

As a concert pianist, Conde played at The Town Hall and Carnegie Hall in New York City. She performed as a soloist with numerous symphony orchestras throughout the United States, and toured throughout Europe and Latin America.

Conde became a popular nightclub act in cities such as Madrid, Mexico City, San Juan, Aruba, Curaçao, Trinidad, Lisbon, London, and Toronto. Her appearances in the United States included an eleven-week engagement at Bimbo's 365 Club in San Francisco, and performances at the Act IV venue in Detroit.

Following a twenty-week run headline in the Folies Bergère at the Tropicana in Las Vegas, Conde was elevated to the club's Fountain room, where she became the star of her own one-woman show.

In 1964 she recorded with Peter Rafael Bloch in New York. This was the first program of Puerto Rican songs to be broadcast over NDR in Germany. She later released two LP records, performing Latin and popular songs.

She was the composer of many songs, including the scores and lyrics for two children's musicals written by Toni Mulett: The Magical Forest (also performed in Spanish as El Conejito Azul), and Toys Without Children. In 1987, she starred at the Museum of the City of New York in a production of Emilia, a musical about her life and career, featuring her own music, along with dialogues by Peter Raphael Bloch, and musical collaboration with Marco Rizo.

After a head injury in 1988, Conde began to experience memory loss and impaired coordination. However, she was determined to maintain her career, and continued teaching and performing until 1992. In 1994, the Museum of the City of New York held a tribute concert in which eight singers performed Conde's music in celebration of her life and career. Conde died in Palm Beach, Florida on February 28, 1998.

== Honors ==
1970

- Received the Ramón Power Medal from the Institute of Puerto Rican Culture in San Juan, Puerto Rico.
- Selected as Hija Predilecta (Favorite Daughter) of her hometown Yauco.

1971

- Received the John F. Kennedy Library for Minorities Award.
- Made an Honorary Member of the Association for Puerto Rican-Hispanic Culture.
- Won Best Popular Singer Award from the Institute of Puerto Rico in New York.

1986

- Awarded the Silver Medal of the Société académique Arts-Sciences-Lettres of Paris, France.

== Discography ==
My Latin Mood

- Released: 1967
- Format: LP
- Label: ABC Records

In a Pop Mood / In a Latin Mood (with Joe Loco and his orchestra)

- Released: 1970
- Format: LP
- Label: Audio Fidelity
