= You Had to Be There (film) =

You Had To Be There: How the Toronto Godspell Ignited the Comedy Revolution, Spread Love & Overalls, and Created a Community That Changed the World (In a Canadian Kind of Way)
- Directed by: Nick Davis
- Screenplay by: Nick Davis; Jane Mendelsohn
- Produced by: Nick Davis; Bonnie Comley; Stewart F. Lane; Tom Powers; Sue Turley
- Cinematography: Phil Cooper; Wolfgang Held
- Edited by: Doug Abel
- Music by: Timo Elliston; Brian Jones
- Animation by: Ace & Son Moving Picture Co., LLC
- Production companies: Open Door; Series of Dreams; XRM Media
- Distributed by: Greenwich Entertainment
- Release dates: September 6, 2025 (TIFF); September 18, 2026 (United States)
- Running time: 98 minutes
- Country: United States
- Language: English
- Box office: $195,575

You Had To Be There: How the Toronto Godspell Ignited the Comedy Revolution, Spread Love & Overalls, and Created a Community That Changed the World (In a Canadian Kind of Way) is a 2025 American documentary film, directed by Nick Davis.

The documentary film centers on a 1972 production of the stage musical Godspell at the Royal Alexandra Theatre in Toronto, Ontario, from which many of its cast members would soon go on to have a transformative impact on both Canadian and American comedy through their involvement in projects such as The Second City and Saturday Night Live.

Cast members in the production included Martin Short, Eugene Levy, Dave Thomas, Gilda Radner, Victor Garber, Andrea Martin and Jayne Eastwood, with Paul Shaffer serving as musical director.

At 2025 Toronto International Film Festival, the film was second runner-up to The Road Between Us: The Ultimate Rescue for the People's Choice Award, Documentary.

== Production ==
Due to the fact that no film footage of the original production survives, the film makes use of animated segments to depict the original production synced to a tape of one performance by cast member Martin Short, while relying mainly on contemporary interviews with the surviving cast members and other figures who have worked with or been influenced by them, as well as archival footage of Gilda Radner and John Candy.

Production on the film was first announced in 2024, with Judd Apatow signing on as executive producer.

== Distribution ==
The film premiered in the Special Presentations lineup at the 2025 Toronto International Film Festival, screened at the Royal Alexandra. In April 2026, Greenwich Entertainment acquired the distribution rights for a September 2026 release.

== Critical response ==
On the review aggregator website Rotten Tomatoes, 94% of 35 critics' reviews are positive, with an average rating of 7.8/10.

Variety said it was "an exuberant and essential doc," with Owen Gleiberman writing "the niftiness of Davis's film is that it's about Godspell and it's about something that's bigger than Godspell." Of the challenges of making a film about a production with no footage, Gleiberman comments that Davis "makes ingenious ways to fill the void... witty animated sequences... makes canny use of [Martin] Short's cassette tape..... It's not anything you can prove. Yet there's passionate testimony from the likes of Mike Meyers and Lin-Manuel Miranda, who hails the show as the "'27 Yankees of comedy." 'You Had to Be There' shows you that something was in the air up there, and that it spread like the world's happiest virus.”

Matthew Carey of Deadline Hollywood wrote that [the film] is "a delightful romp down memory lane that takes surprising twists and turns.... 'You Had to Be There' abounds in hilarious anecdotes, like the story of Levy, who eventually took on the lead role of Jesus after Garber went to make the movie version of Godspell....Knowing that Jesus first takes the stage clad only in boxer shorts, the show's producers asked the impressively hirsute actor if he wouldn't mind waxing to remove some of that carpeting from his chest. Levy declined, so they clapped a tank top on him fearing the sight of his naked torso would frighten children in the audience...."'You Had to Be There" leverages wonderful animation to make up for the absence of original Godspell footage; it's rendered in perfectly fitting '70s style. At the end of the film the surviving cast gets together for a reunion, with Shaffer back on the piano and Garber, Martin, Short, Levy et al jumping right back into Godspell tunes... a funny and moving ride."

For That Shelf, Rachel West wrote that "You Had To Be There makes an excellent companion piece to TIFF's opening night film, John Candy: I Like Me directed by Colin Hanks. The iconic Canadian comedian was in the orbit of the Godspell cast and is shown here in archival footage expressing his disdain for not having been part of the cast. Warm and genuine, You Had To Be There is a highly entertaining look at comedy and Canadiana. Davis' documentary makes it clear: you really did have to be there – but thanks to this film, now we all kind of are."

For Mashable, Kristy Puchko writes that "documentarian Nick Davis aims to bring us back to this pivotal time and place with the preposterously and perfectly titled [film].... 'You Had to Be There' is so stuffed with interviews with comedy icons, remarkable anecdotes, and cheeky revelations that it's manna from heaven for comedy nerds.... Of course, looking back not only on this production but on 50-some years in show business, not all the stories are funny. Props to Davis, who gives voice to one player in particular, actress/singer Avril Chown. She uses this platform to finally share her story, which includes a harrowing tale of abuse that came after Godspell's cast had taken their final bow. Before she recounts her heartbreaking experience, she asks simply, 'How much blood do you want to give for something you love?'"

== Awards ==
At 2025 Toronto International Film Festival, the film was second runner-up to The Road Between Us: The Ultimate Rescue for the People's Choice Award, Documentary.
