= Hot Docs at Home =

Canadian television programming block

- Genre: Documentary films
- Country of origin: Canada

Original release
- Network: CBC Television
- Release: April 16 – May 28, 2020

Hot Docs at Home is a Canadian television programming block, which premiered April 16, 2020 on CBC Television. Introduced as a special series during the COVID-19 pandemic in Canada, the series aired several feature documentary films that had been scheduled to premiere at the 2020 Hot Docs Canadian International Documentary Festival before its postponement. The films aired on CBC Television at 8 p.m. EST on Thursdays and on the CBC's Documentary Channel later the same evening, and were made available for streaming on the CBC Gem platform.

During the same period, the Documentary Channel also aired a number of older documentary films which were screened at past editions of the Hot Docs festival.

Several of the films broadcast on the series received Canadian Screen Award nominations in television documentary categories at the 9th Canadian Screen Awards in 2021, with 9/11 Kids winning the Donald Brittain Award for best social or political documentary.

== Schedule ==
Films broadcast on the series were:

- April 16: Made You Look: A True Story About Fake Art - Barry Avrich
- April 23: 9/11 Kids - Elizabeth St. Philip
- April 30: Finding Sally - Tamara Mariam Dawit
- May 7: Meat the Future - Liz Marshall
- May 14: They Call Me Dr. Miami - Jean-Simon Chartier
- May 21: Influence - Richard Poplak and Diana Neille
- May 28: The Walrus and the Whistleblower - Nathalie Bibeau
