= Noam Tibon =

Israeli military officer

- Official portrait, 2009

Faction represented in the Knesset
- 2026–: Together

Personal details
- Born: 4 March 1962 (age 64) Tzora, Israel
- Party: Yesh Atid (since 2025)
- Spouse: Gali Mir-Tibon
- Children: 2, including Amir
- Education: University of Haifa; Harvard University

Military service
- Allegiance: Israel
- Branch/service: Israel Defense Forces
- Rank: Aluf (Major General)
- Commands: 202nd Paratroopers Battalion; Deputy commander, Paratroopers Brigade; Etzion Regional Brigade; Judea Regional Brigade; Nahal Brigade; Head of Human Resources Division, GOC Army Headquarters; Chief Infantry and Paratroopers Officer; Judea and Samaria Division; IDF Command and Staff College; 479th Corps
- Battles/wars: 1982 Lebanon War; Second Intifada; 2006 Lebanon War; Gaza War (2008–2009); 2012 Gaza War; 2014 Gaza War

Noam Moshe Tibon (born 4 March 1962) is an Israeli retired major general (Aluf) of the Israel Defense Forces (IDF) and politician. His final position in active military service was commander of the 479th Corps. He was elected to the Knesset in 2026 as an MK for Together.

== Early life and education ==
Tibon was born and raised in Tzora, a kibbutz in the Mateh Yehuda Regional Council, and has a brother and a sister. His parents were among the founders of the kibbutz and married in 1952. His mother, Aliza Tibon, was the daughter of Erna Kraft (née Helle), a sister of educator Toni Halle, and the German-Israeli writer Werner Kraft. His father, Yoav Tibon (Pfefferman), served as head of the Gizo Regional Council and later as deputy head of the Mateh Yehuda Regional Council. His paternal grandparents were Emanuel Pfefferman, one of the founders of the National Library of Israel, and Yolan Edlitz-Pfefferman, a lecturer in organic chemistry at the Hebrew University of Jerusalem and one of its first female chemistry lecturers.

Tibon attended the regional school at Givat Brenner and completed a year of volunteer service in Arad through the HaNoar HaOved VeHaLomed youth movement.

== Military career ==
Graffiti depicting Tibon in Tel Aviv, inspired by the comic-book superhero the Flash, following his rescue efforts on 7 October 2023.

Tibon enlisted in the IDF in November 1981 and served in Sayeret Matkal. After completing basic training with the Paratroopers Brigade, he underwent combat and squad-leader training. He fought in the 1982 Lebanon War, during which Sayeret Matkal participated in infantry operations. He subsequently became a team commander and was discharged after several years of service.

In 1987, following the appointment of Moshe Ya'alon as commander of Sayeret Matkal, Tibon returned to active military service as a team commander. He was scheduled to attend officer training, but this was cancelled because of his participation in a special operation. Following the operation, he received an officer's commission without attending the regular course. He remained with Sayeret Matkal until 1989, eventually commanding a specialized element of the unit.

In 1989, Tibon transferred to the Paratroopers Brigade, serving as deputy commander of its 890th Battalion under Gadi Shamni. He temporarily assumed command after Shamni was injured in a road accident. In 1993, he was appointed commander of the 202nd Paratroopers Battalion, leading it during the South Lebanon conflict (1985–2000). In 1995, he became an instructor at the IDF Command and Staff College, but was recalled to command the battalion following the injury of Hagai Mordechai in Lebanon. He next served as deputy commander of the Paratroopers Brigade.

=== Colonel ===
After graduating with distinction from the Marine Corps Command and Staff College at Quantico, Virginia, Tibon was promoted to colonel in 1997 and appointed commander of the Etzion Regional Brigade.

In 1999, he became commander of the Judea Regional Brigade, responsible for the Hebron area, and served until 2001. During this appointment he publicly criticized the Hebron Agreement, drawing a reprimand from Benny Gantz, then commander of the Judea and Samaria Division.

During the Second Intifada, Tibon was among field commanders who advocated operations against Palestinian militant groups in dense urban areas and refugee camps, despite the tactical difficulties and reservations of more senior officers. Other commanders associated with this approach included Yair Golan, Moshe Tamir, Aviv Kochavi and Gal Hirsch.

From July 2002 to August 2004, he commanded the Nahal Brigade.

=== Brigadier general ===
Following his promotion to brigadier general, Tibon was head of the Human Resources Division at the GOC Army Headquarters from 2004 to 2006. From 2006 to 2007, he served as Chief Infantry and Paratroopers Officer.

In July 2007, he was appointed commander of the Judea and Samaria Division, remaining in that post until October 2009. His tenure was characterized by a relatively low level of violence compared with earlier periods of the Second Intifada. During this period, one attack originating in the West Bank was carried out inside the Green Line, and 11 Israeli soldiers and civilians were killed in attacks attributed to Palestinian militants. Coordination between the IDF and the Palestinian Authority's security forces improved, and numerous Israeli military checkpoints were removed.

He was also involved in the issue of evacuating unauthorized Israeli outposts in the West Bank. Right-wing activists held regular demonstrations outside his Tel Aviv home. The protests were not universally supported among settlement leaders: Pinchas Wallerstein, then director-general of the Yesha Council, said that the settlement movement should be grateful to Tibon for his contribution to Israel's security.

From 2009 to 2011, Tibon commanded the IDF Command and Staff College.

=== Major general ===
On 19 January 2012, Tibon was promoted to major general (aluf) and appointed commander of the IDF's 479th Corps.

During the 2014 Gaza War, IDF Chief of Staff Benny Gantz appointed Tibon to oversee military investigations into sensitive incidents involving harm to civilians in Gaza. Tibon retired in 2015.

== Civilian activities ==
Tibon addressing a demonstration calling for an end to the war in Gaza at Habima Square, Tel Aviv, 24 July 2025.

In February 2016, Tibon was appointed volunteer chairman of Tel Aviv Global & Tourism, an organization affiliated with the Tel Aviv-Yafo Municipality. From August 2015 to August 2024, he served as an independent director on the board of Villar International Ltd. He served as CEO of Tracense Systems until December 2020.

Ahead of the April 2019 Israeli legislative election, Tibon expressed support for the Israeli Labor Party and its leader, Avi Gabbay.

In 2022, he headed a panel of experts investigating a friendly-fire incident in which two commanders of the Egoz Unit were killed.

=== Rescue operations during the 7 October attacks ===
During the 7 October attacks in 2023, Hamas-led militants infiltrated Nahal Oz, where Tibon's son, journalist Amir Tibon, lived with his family, and killed residents in the Nahal Oz massacre. Tibon traveled from Tel Aviv with his wife, Gali Mir-Tibon, to rescue their son and his family. He encountered retired major general Israel Ziv, and they joined a force from the Maglan unit.

They helped rescue residents, including Tibon's relatives. Tibon also assisted survivors of the Re'im music festival massacre and wounded soldiers.

His rescue efforts were the subject of the documentary film The Road Between Us: The Ultimate Rescue, directed by Canadian filmmaker Barry Avrich. In September 2025, the film won the People's Choice Documentary Award at the Toronto International Film Festival.

Following the attacks, Tibon led the "Generals' Project", which assigned retired IDF major generals to southern Israeli communities to provide military expertise, coordinate assistance and expedite responses to local needs.

=== Public activism during the Israel–Hamas war ===
Following the attacks, Tibon criticized the limited IDF deployment around Gaza at the time of the assault, arguing that units which should have been stationed on the border had instead been deployed in the West Bank.

He called for a state commission of inquiry into the failures surrounding 7 October, saying this was necessary to prevent future disasters and provide answers to those affected. He warned that delays could impair the investigation. Tibon called for the resignation of senior officials responsible for security on 7 October, including Prime Minister Benjamin Netanyahu.

Tibon accused Netanyahu of attempting to obstruct an investigation and conceal information. He also criticized Netanyahu's dismissal of Defense Minister Yoav Gallant and what Tibon described as demands for personal loyalty from Ronen Bar, then head of the Shin Bet. Tibon argued that the government was weakening Israel's security institutions.

Tibon became involved in protests advocating more equal participation in military service during the war. Following remarks by Sephardi Chief Rabbi Yitzhak Yosef about ultra-Orthodox conscription, Tibon convened a press conference for the "Combatants for Equal Service Forum", which he established with Brothers and Sisters in Arms.

In June 2024, he received the Knight of Quality Government Award from the Movement for Quality Government in Israel.

Tibon founded the "Defensive Shield for Israel" forum, which participated in protests against the 2023 Israeli judicial reform and supported more equal military service. The forum includes more than 170 former senior security officials, including former chiefs of staff, police commissioners, Mossad and Shin Bet directors, major generals and other retired senior officers. Tibon said it was created because he believed Israel's national security was at risk.

On 18 November 2025, Tibon joined the Yesh Atid party. He was subsequently placed sixth on the Together electoral list headed by Naftali Bennett for the 26th Knesset. He was elected to the Knesset.

== Personal life ==
Tibon holds a bachelor's degree in history from the University of Haifa and a master's degree in public administration from Harvard University, where he studied through the Wexner Foundation program. He also graduated from the IDF company commanders' course and the IDF Command and Staff College.

He lives in northern Tel Aviv with his wife, author and educator Gali Mir-Tibon, whose work focuses on education and Holocaust research. They have two sons: journalist Amir Tibon and physician Uri Tibon.
