= A Soft Touch =

A Soft Touch may refer to:

- A Soft Touch (film), a Canadian short drama film directed by Heather Young
- "A Soft Touch" (Doctors), a 2004 television episode
