= Marchessault =

Marchessault (/ˈmɑːrʃəˌsoʊ/) is a surname. Notable people with the surname include:

- Janine Marchessault, Canadian academic
- Jonathan Marchessault (born 1990), Canadian ice hockey player
- Jovette Marchessault (1938–2012), Canadian writer and artist
