= Made You Look =

Made You Look may refer to:

- "Made You Look" (Nas song), 2002
- "Made You Look" (Euphoria), a 2019 television episode
- "Made You Look" (Meghan Trainor song), 2022
- Made You Look: A True Story About Fake Art, a 2020 documentary
- "Made You Look" (Shrinking), a 2024 television episode
