= Filthy Gorgeous =

Filthy Gorgeous may refer to:

- "Filthy/Gorgeous", a song by Scissor Sisters
- Filthy Gorgeous: The Bob Guccione Story, a 2013 film
