= Padre nuestro =

Padre nuestro (Spanish for "Our Father") may refer to

- The Lord's Prayer, as commonly referred to in Spanish
- Padre nuestro (2007 film), a 2007 American–Argentine film
- Our Father (1953 film), a 1953 Mexican film
- Padre nuestro (1985 film), a 1985 Spanish film
- Padre nuestro (2005 film), a 2005 Chilean film
- "Padre Nuestro," a song by E Nomine

== See also ==
- Our Father (disambiguation)
