= Talk Me =

- Directed by: Joecar Hanna
- Screenplay by: Joecar Hanna
- Produced by: Spike Lee
- Starring: Joecar Hanna; Melanie Smith; Albert Carbó; Carlos Gorbe
- Cinematography: Sam Motamedi
- Edited by: Joecar Hanna
- Production company: New York University
- Release date: May 2025 (Cannes)
- Running time: 20 minutes
- Countries: Spain; United States
- Languages: Spanish; Catalan; Valencian; Cantonese; Fang

Talk Me is an American-Spanish short drama film, directed by Joecar Hanna and released in 2025. Set in a world where intimate conversation has been outlawed, the film stars Hanna as Pedro, a man stuck in an unfulfilling marriage to his husband, who discovers the emotional intimacy of singing when he meets and becomes fascinated by Kira (Melanie Smith), a free-spirited woman.

Hanna described the film as being partly a metaphor for his cultural displacement as a person of mixed Spanish, African and Asian heritage who often feels like both an insider and an outsider to multiple cultures. He deliberately set the film in a "reversed" world in which sexual intimacy is permitted but sharing feelings through conversation is taboo.

The film premiered in the Cinéfondation program of student films at the 2025 Cannes Film Festival. It was subsequently screened at the 2025 Toronto International Film Festival, where it was named the winner of the award for Best International Short Film.
