= Meat the Future =

- Directed by: Liz Marshall
- Written by: Liz Marshall
- Produced by: Liz Marshall
- Cinematography: John Price
- Edited by: Caroline Christie; Roland Schlimme
- Music by: Igor Correia
- Production company: LizMars Productions
- Release date: May 7, 2020 (Hot Docs)
- Running time: 88 minutes
- Country: Canada
- Language: English

Meat the Future is a 2020 Canadian documentary film, directed by Liz Marshall. The film profiles various scientists who are working on the development of cultured meat.

The film premiered as part of the 2020 Hot Docs Canadian International Documentary Festival. Due to the COVID-19 pandemic in Canada, it was not screened theatrically, but premiered as part of the festival's online streaming component and aired on CBC Television on May 7 as part of the network's special Hot Docs at Home series of films from the festival.

The film received two Canadian Screen Award nominations at the 9th Canadian Screen Awards in 2021, for the Donald Brittain Award for best social or political documentary program and Best Sound in a Non-Fiction Program or Series (Matt Chan, Graham Rogers, Elma Bello, Michelle Irving and Chris Miller).
