= Filthy Gorgeous: The Bob Guccione Story =

- Directed by: Barry Avrich
- Produced by: Mike Reid; Rick Schwartz; Jeremy Frommer
- Cinematography: Ken Ng
- Edited by: George Roulston
- Music by: Jim McGrath
- Distributed by: Melbar Entertainment Group; Filthy Gorgeous Media
- Release date: 9 September 2013 (TIFF)
- Running time: 96 minutes
- Country: Canada
- Language: English

Filthy Gorgeous: The Bob Guccione Story is a 2013 Canadian biographical documentary film which is a biography of Penthouse magazine founder Bob Guccione. The film is directed by Barry Avrich.

== Synopsis ==
The documentary describes Guccione's life from his schooling and early career through the development of his publishing empire (Penthouse, Omni, Spin). Interview subjects include former Penthouse editor Lynn Barber and Guccione's sons.

== Interviewees ==
- Patrice Adcroft - former editor of Omni magazine
- Audrey Arnold
- Peter Bloch - writer
- Joe Brooks - writer
- Len Carney
- Divina Celeste - 1982 February Pet of the Month
- Richard Crouse - writer
- Dana DeArmond - adult film actress
- Alan M. Dershowitz - lawyer and confidante to Guccione
- Al Goldstein - publisher, Screw magazine
- Leslie Jay Gould - writer
- Bob Guccione Jr. - eldest son of Guccione and founder of music magazine Spin
- Nick Guccione - youngest son of Guccione
- Anthony Haden-Guest - writer
- Xaviera Hollander - writer and Penthouse columnist
- Jane Homlish - Guccione's personal assistant for over 30 years
- Victoria Johnson - model, actress, 1977 Penthouse Pet of the Year and former lover of Guccione
- Victor Kovner - attorney
- George Lois - designer, author

== Release ==
The film premiered at the Toronto International Film Festival on 9 September 2013.

The documentary was broadcast in Canada on The Movie Network and Movie Central and in the United States on Epix in November 2013.
