= Finding Sally =

2020 Canadian-Ethiopian film

- Written by: Tamara Dawit
- Directed by: Tamara Dawit
- Starring: Tsehai Tesfamichael; Abrehet Asefa; Tamara Mariam Dawit
- Music by: Zaki Ibrahim
- Country of origin: Canada
- Original languages: Amharic; English

Production
- Producer: Isabelle Couture
- Cinematography: Alex Margineanu
- Editor: Mahi Rahgozar
- Running time: 78 minutes
- Production companies: CatBird Films; Cinema Politica; Documentary Channel; Gobez Media

Original release
- Network: CBC Television
- Release: 30 April 2020

Finding Sally is a 2020 Canadian political autobiographical documentary television film directed by Ethiopian-Canadian director Tamara Mariam Dawit and produced by Isabelle Couture. The film received positive reviews from critics.

The film is based on the mysterious life of the Sally, an Ethiopian aristocrat-turned-communist-rebel. She was the aunt of director Tamara Dawit. Sally disappeared after the Ethiopian revolution which lead to the overthrow of Emperor Haile Selassie. The film has been shot in Ethiopia.

The film had been scheduled to premiere at the 2020 Hot Docs Canadian International Documentary Festival; however, following the cancellation of the festival due to the COVID-19 pandemic in Canada, it was one of the films selected for CBC Television's special Hot Docs at Home series, in which it premiered on April 30, 2020.

In 2021, the film was nominated for the Best Documentary Program at the 9th Canadian Screen Awards. Before that, the film also has nominated for the Best Documentary at the Durban International Film Festival in 2020. It was also nominated for the Audience Award at the Internationales Frauen Film Fest.

== Cast ==
- Tsehai Tesfamichael
- Abrehet Asefa
- Tamara Mariam Dawit
- Kibre Dawit
- Tsion Dawit
- Brutawit Dawit
- Menbere Dawit
- Ferkete Gerbremariam
- Ashenafi Kersma
- Brur Gebrai
