= David Foster: Off the Record =

- Directed by: Barry Avrich
- Produced by: Randy Lennox; Barry Avrich; Caitlin Cheddie
- Starring: David Foster
- Cinematography: Ken Ng
- Edited by: Eugene Weis
- Production companies: Melbar Entertainment Group; Bell Media Studios
- Distributed by: Bell Media
- Release date: September 9, 2019 (TIFF)
- Running time: 91 minutes
- Country: Canada
- Language: English

David Foster: Off the Record is a 2019 Canadian documentary film, directed by Barry Avrich. The film profiles influential Canadian record producer David Foster, through a mix of archival footage and interviews with Foster, his family, and musicians who have worked with him including Barbra Streisand, Lionel Richie, Michael Bublé, Céline Dion, Quincy Jones, Clive Davis, Josh Groban, Kristin Chenoweth, Peter Cetera, Diane Warren and Carol Bayer Sager.

The film premiered at the 2019 Toronto International Film Festival as a TIFF Special Event. Following its television broadcast in 2020, it received a Canadian Screen Award nomination for Best Biography or Arts Documentary Program or Series at the 9th Canadian Screen Awards in 2021.
