= Klee (film) =

- Directed by: Gavin Baird
- Screenplay by: Gavin Baird
- Produced by: Gavin Baird; Kyle Zurevinski; Jacob Farrell; Kayla Peters
- Starring: Seth Cardinal Dodginghorse; Hannah Brennen
- Cinematography: Matthew Ripplinger
- Music by: Bret Parenteau & Respectful Child
- Production company: Dynamic Video Imaging
- Release date: September 5, 2025 (TIFF)
- Running time: 20 minutes
- Country: Canada
- Language: English

Klee is a Canadian short horror film, directed by Gavin Baird and released in 2025. The film stars Seth Cardinal Dodginghorse as a shapeshifting alien who is sent to 19th-century Saskatchewan, in the form of a First Nations man, with a mission to find and kill a family of farm settlers through sex.

The cast also includes Hannah Brennen, Joan Mylymok, Gin Fedotov, Michael Barber, Timothy Boechler, Todd William Lewis, Shayne Metcalfe and J. T. Smith in supporting roles.

Baird was a recipient of the memorial Jeff Barnaby Grant from the ImagineNATIVE Film and Media Arts Festival in 2023 for the project.

The film premiered at the 2025 Toronto International Film Festival, and was subsequently screened at the 2025 Festival du nouveau cinéma and the Saskatoon Fantastic Film Festival.

The film was named to TIFF's annual year-end Canada's Top Ten list for 2025, and won the After Dark Award at the 2026 ImagineNATIVE Film and Media Arts Festival.
