= Amir Tibon =

Israeli journalist

- אמיר תיבון
- Born: February 11, 1989 (age 37)
- Occupations: Israeli journalist, writer, diplomatic correspondent
- Spouse: Miri
- Children: 2 daughters
- Parents: Noam Tibon (father); Gali Mir-Tibon (mother)
- Relatives: Yoav Tibon (grandfather)

Amir Tibon (Hebrew: אמיר תיבון; born 11 February 1989) is an Israeli journalist and writer. He works for Haaretz, but has also worked for Walla! News and as a diplomatic correspondent.

== Biography ==
Tibon's great-grandfather was a German soldier in World War I, and fled the country after the Nazis came to power.

In the early 2000s, Amir Tibon was a resident of Tel Aviv. Tibon and his wife (then fiancée), Miri, moved to Kibbutz Nahal Oz, following a journalistic visit in August 2014. The couple has two daughters.

On 7 October 2023, Nahal Oz was attacked by Hamas militants while Tibon and his family were at home. They remained in their house's safe room for ten hours until Tibon's father, Noam Tibon, a retired general, arrived from Tel Aviv, along with an Israeli soldier he picked up along the way. On October 8, Tibon wrote about his experience stating "the Israeli state failed us".

On 9 October 2023, Tibon criticized American senator Josh Hawley for suggesting that American funding for Ukraine be redirected to Israel. Tibon considers himself a "left-leaning" Zionist. He noted in October 2024 that "Although I supported the war at the beginning...I now prefer an agreement to bring back the hostages and end the conflict".

As of September 2024, Tibon and his family are living in Kibbutz Mishmar HaEmek.

The 2025 Canadian documentary film The Road Between Us: The Ultimate Rescue documented the 2023 rescue of Tibon and his family. It premiered at the Toronto International Film Festival in September 2025, and won the TIFF People's Choice Award, Documentary.

== Journalism and literary career ==
In 2015, Tibon was one of 15 journalists who signed a letter criticizing a proposed policy that would prevent Israel Broadcasting Authority journalists from expressing their opinions on-air. In 2016, Tibon wrote an article critical of Israeli prime minister Benjamin Netanyahu for Walla. The Prime Minister's Office unsuccessfully pressured the site to remove Tibon's article.

Tibon began working as a Washington correspondent for Haaretz in early 2017, the week of Donald Trump's inauguration. He continued working as a Washington correspondent through 2020.

Tibon co-authored a biography of Mahmoud Abbas, entitled The Last Palestinian: The Rise and Reign of Mahmoud Abbas, which was published in 2017.

In 2024, Tibon published The Gates of Gaza: A Story of Betrayal, Survival and Hope on Israel’s Borderlands, a non-fiction book about the October 7 attack on Nahal Oz and the events leading up to it.

== Awards and recognition ==
In January 2015, Tibon and fellow journalist Ben Birnbaum were nominated for a National Magazine Award for their reporting in The New Republic, entitled "How Close They Came".
