= Knoedler =

Defunct New York City art dealership

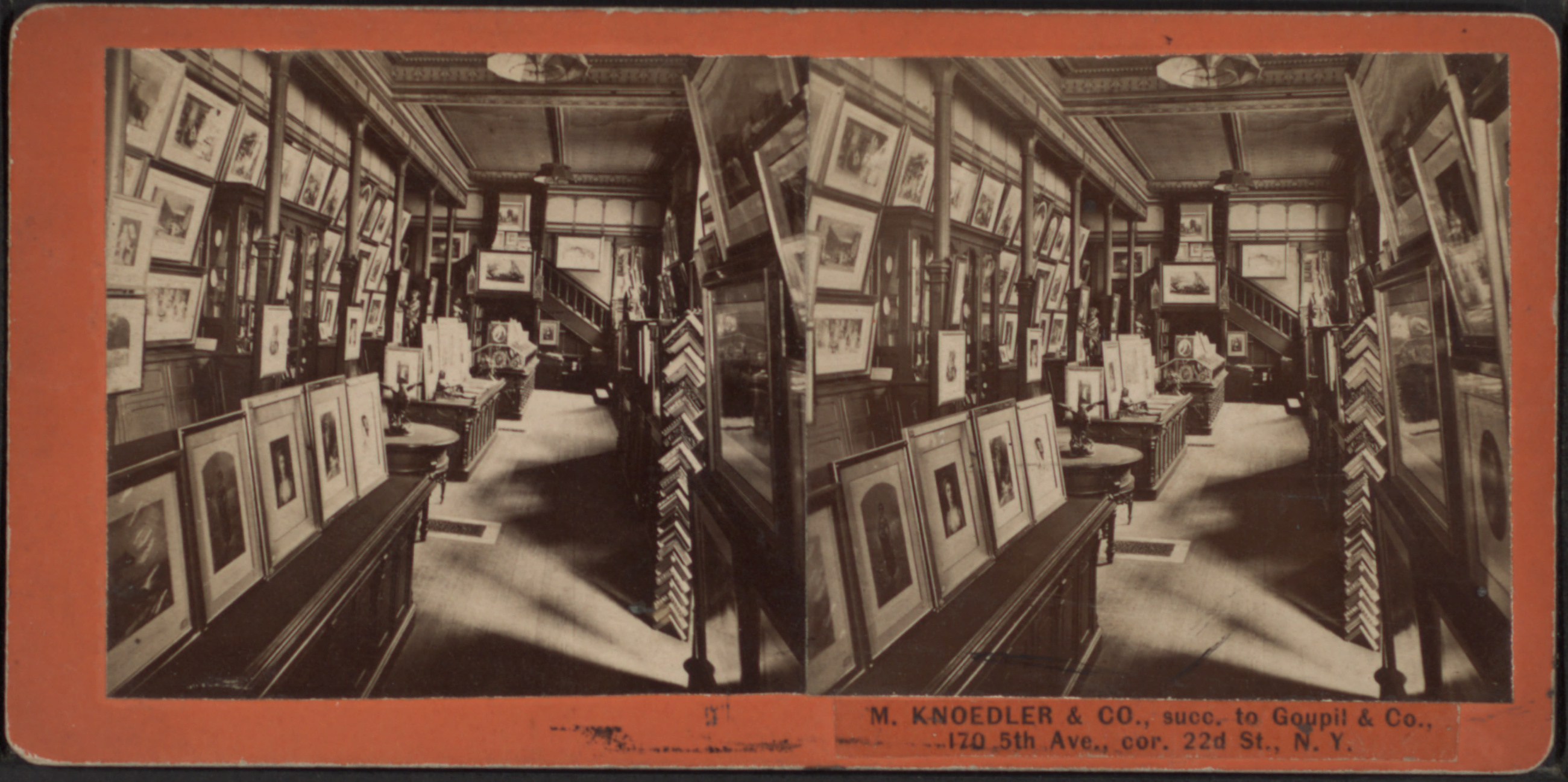
Stereoscopic photograph of the Knoedler gallery interior, c. 1860–1880

M. Knoedler & Co. (/ˈnoʊdlər/) was an art dealership in New York City founded in 1846. When it closed in 2011, amid lawsuits for fraud, it was one of the oldest commercial art galleries in the US, having been in operation for 165 years.

== History ==
Knoedler dated its origin to 1846, when French dealers Goupil & Cie opened a branch in New York. Goupil & Cie was an extremely dynamic print-publishing house founded in Paris in 1827. Michel (later Michael) Knoedler (1823–1878), born in Kapf near Schwäbisch Gmünd in Baden-Württemberg, Germany, started to work for Goupil & Cie in Paris in 1844, and moved to New York in 1852 to take charge of the New York branch. He purchased the U.S. arm of the business in 1857, and was later joined by his sons Roland (1856–1932), Edmond and Charles, with Roland taking the lead after his father's death in 1878.

With dealer Charles Carstairs, Knoedler opened branches in Paris (1895), Pittsburgh (1897), and London (1908), and, under Carstairs' influence developed a reputation as a leading dealer of Old Master paintings, with customers including collectors such as Collis P. Huntington, Cornelius Vanderbilt, Henry O. Havemeyer, William Rockefeller, Walter P. Chrysler Jr., John Jacob Astor, Andrew Mellon, J. P. Morgan, and Henry Clay Frick, and institutions such as the Metropolitan Museum of Art, the Louvre, and the Tate Gallery. Knoedler & Co. became part of an elite group of art dealerships, which dominated the market for British painting in America. Knoedler developed a fruitful relationship with London gallery Colnaghi, with Colnaghi finding suitable paintings in Europe for Knoedler to sell to wealthy collectors in the US. Knoedler and Colnaghi were involved in the secret sales by the Soviet government of works from the Russian Imperial collection in the Hermitage in the 1920s and 1930s, along with Matthiesen in Berlin.

After Roland Knoedler retired in 1928, the management of the firm passed to his nephew Charles Henschel, with Carmen Mesmore, Charles Carstairs and his son Carroll Carstairs. Henschel died in 1956, and E. Coe Kerr and Roland Balay (Michael Knoedler's grandson) took over. The firm was sold to industrialist and collector Armand Hammer for $2.5 million in 1971. Five years later, the last member of the Knoedler family - Roland Balay - ceased his involvement in the management of the firm. It increasingly concentrated on contemporary art from the late 1970s. After Hammer's death in 1990, the Hammer foundation continued to hold a controlling interest in the gallery until it closed in 2011, when Michael Armand Hammer (Armand Hammer's grandson) was its chairman.

== Locations ==
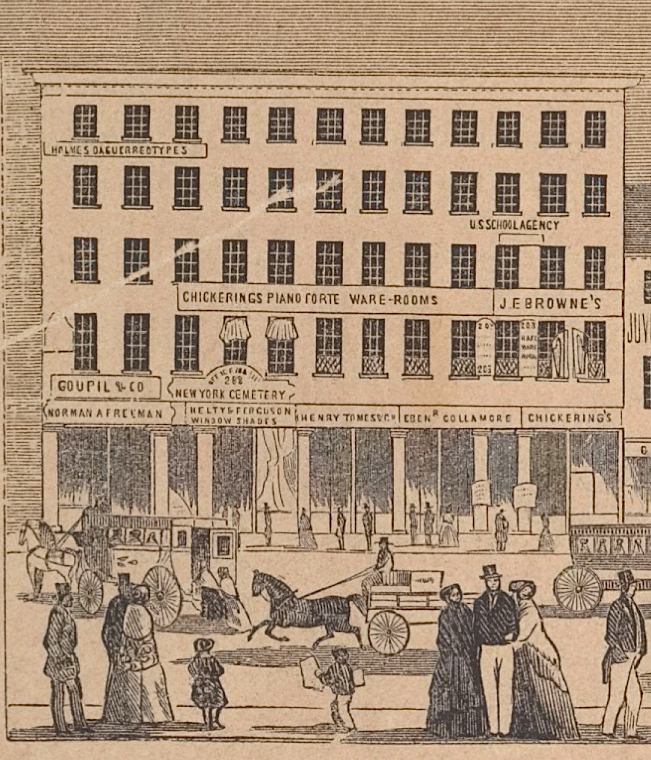
First location of the gallery on the Broadway (wood engraving, 1854)

The art dealership occupied eight different locations, starting on Broadway. By the 1890s, it operated from a row house at Fifth Avenue and 34th Street. By 1911, the row house was scheduled to be demolished to make way for the B. Altman and Company Building, so Knoedler moved to a new building at 556 Fifth Avenue, designed by Carrère and Hastings. Knoedler then moved to another new building by Carrère and Hastings at 14 East 57th Street, near Madison Avenue, in 1925. In 1970, the firm incurred significant costs in refurbishing new premises in an Italian Renaissance-style town house at 19 East 70th Street.

Knoedler held a 150-year retrospective in 1996, exhibiting works such as John Singleton Copley's Watson and the Shark, Thomas Eakins's Music, and Édouard Manet's The Plum, with loans from 15 institutions, including the Corcoran Gallery of Art, the Metropolitan Museum of Art and the National Gallery of Art, a coup for a commercial gallery.

In February 2011, the gallery sold its premises at 19 East 70th Street for $31 million. In 2012, the gallery attempted to auction a portion of its remaining inventory of artworks.

== Alleged connection to Nazi looted art ==
Knoedler was involved in several high profile lawsuits involving Nazi looted art, including a Matisse confiscated by the Nazis in 1941 from the Rosenberg family which Knoedler acquired in 1954 and which was eventually donated to the Seattle Art Museum in 1996 by Virginia and Prentice Bloedel, and an El Greco seized by the Gestapo in 1944. The El Greco painting, Portrait of a Gentleman, was listed in exhibition catalogues as being in the collection of New York’s Knoedler & Co, who bought the painting from the Viennese dealer Frederick Mont, a dealer who worked with the Gestapo, according to Anne Webber, co-chair of the Commission for Looted Art in Europe. Both paintings were restituted after lawsuits were filed.

In 2003 the Springfield Library and Museum Association sued Knoedler for loss of a $3 million painting that it had to return to the museum to Italy as war loot.

Knoedler was also involved in the long-running Cassirer v Thyssen case concerning a Camille Pissarro painting, Rue St. Honoré, après midi, effet de pluie. The art dealer Frank Perls placed the painting on consignment with Knoedler on behalf of Sidney Brody. There it was purchased by Sydney Schoenberg, an art collector in St. Louis, Missouri who sent it to the Stephen Hahn Gallery, from which Baron Hans Heinrich Thyssen-Bornemisza of Lugano, Switzerland purchased it in October 1976.

== Art fraud scandal and closure ==
The gallery's president Ann Freedman resigned in October 2009, amid rumours of forged paintings supplied to the gallery by Long Island art dealer Glafira Rosales.

It was later discovered that between 1994 and 2011, under Freedman's direction, the gallery had sold almost 40 faked Abstract Expressionist paintings of works by Robert Motherwell, Jackson Pollock, and Mark Rothko, among others. Freedman had purchased the paintings for Knoedler from Glafira Rosales, who had in turn obtained the fake paintings from the art forger Pei-Shen Qian (Chinese: 錢培琛). Qian had reportedly painted the forgeries in a garage in Queens, New York. Qian was able to imitate the styles of the masters, and give the paintings an illusion of age by using tea or dirt from a vacuum cleaner, dirtying their appearance. He is reported to have received less than US$9,000 for each painting from Rosales, while Rosales sold the paintings for millions of dollars to Knoedler.

A statement issued on 28 November 2011 by Knoedler stated simply that it was closing permanently for business reasons, unrelated to the lawsuits it faced over the sale of forged paintings.

By 2012, the FBI was investigating "at least two dozen paintings" that were supplied to the gallery by Glafira Rosales. While Rosales initially claimed not to have defrauded anyone, in 2013, she pleaded guilty to selling over 60 fake works of art to two New York art galleries, conspiracy to commit money laundering, money laundering and tax evasion, and wire fraud. She served three months in jail. In 2017, Rosales was ordered to pay $81 million to the victims of the Knoedler art-fraud scheme, but received leniency in sentencing due to her cooperation with the US government.

Spanish art dealer José Carlos Bergantiños Díaz (Rosales' boyfriend) and his brother Jesús Ángel Bergantiños Díaz were also indicted in US District Court for the fraud. The Díaz brothers were arrested in Spain, and released on bail, in 2014. In 2016, a Spanish court ruled that Jesús Díaz could be extradited to the US. Later that year, a Spanish court ruled that Jesús' brother, José Díaz, could not be extradited to the US for health reasons.

The art forger who painted the fakes, Pei-Shen Qian, was indicted but avoided prosecution by fleeing to China. Authorities said at the moment of the trial that he earned sums ranging from several hundred dollars to as much as $9,000 to create a work.

In 2020, filmmaker Barry Avrich directed and produced the Netflix film, Made You Look: A True Story About Fake Art, a documentary on the Knoedler Gallery forgery scandal. Daria Price's feature documentary about the scandal and trial, Driven to Abstraction, premiered in London in 2019.

== Lawsuits and claims related to sales ==
In 2003, Goldman Sachs executive Jack Levy bought an untitled Jackson Pollock painting for $2 million, but when the International Foundation for Art Research declined to authenticate the work, Levy asked for and received his money back.

Also in 2003 the Springfield Library and Museum Association sued Knoedler for loss of a $3 million painting, Spring Sowing by Jacopo da Ponte (Il Bassano) which Springfield had been obliged to restitute to Italy after the painting was proven to have been war loot.

The day before the gallery closed in November 2011, Belgian hedge-fund manager Pierre Lagrange sued the gallery in relation to the work Untitled 1950, which Knoedler attributed to Jackson Pollock. Lagrange had purchased the painting for $17 million in 2007, on the understanding that it would be included in a supplement to the Pollock catalogue raisonné. In reality, although Freedman had lobbied for the untitled painting to be added to the catalogue raisonné, no such supplement was planned. Tests later showed that some of the paint used was not available until some years after Pollock's death. The suit was settled out of court in 2012.

In 2012, Domenico De Sole and his wife Eleanore claimed that the gallery sold them a fake Mark Rothko, Untitled 1956, for $8.3 million in 2004. The lawsuit, with Knoedler and Ann Freedman as defendants, went to trial in January 2016. The Soles settled out of court with Freedman on February 7, 2015, but continued their suit against Knoedler.

Wall Street executive John D. Howard sued Knoedler and its former director Ann Freedman in 2012, claiming that a Willem de Kooning painting that he bought for $4 million in 2007 was a fake. The suit was settled out of court in December 2015.

In 2021 the estate of Eugene Thaw reached a settlement agreement with the heirs of Margarete Eisenmann concerning Lucas Cranach the Elder's The Resurrection which had passed through Hugo Perls and the Knoedler Gallery before reaching Thaw. Eisenmann had been deported to Theriesenstandt in September 1942 and killed at the Treblinka concentration camp.

== Archive ==
In 2012, the Getty Research Institute announced that it had purchased the majority of the gallery's archives, dating from 1850 to 1971. The Getty subsequently digitized parts of the archive and made them available online. With the exception of the reference library, which the Knoedler Gallery sold separately in January 2012, and which consists of titles already in the Getty Research Institute's library, this acquisition represents the complete archive of the gallery's operations from the 1850s to 1971, when it was acquired by Armand Hammer. The archival material includes business records; correspondence among clients, artists, and Knoedler staff; card files on clients and artworks; photographs; prints; rare books; sales catalogs dating to the 18th century; and gallery installation plans.

The Paul Mellon Centre for Studies in British Art in London holds the Frank Simpson Archive, a substantial proportion of which comprises records from the London office of M. Knoedler & Co., dating from the early 1900s to 1971, which were acquired by Simpson whilst working there as Librarian from 1958-1971. This material includes over five hundred files which contain correspondence, images and pedigree information concerning approximately four to five thousand works of art, the majority of which passed through Knoedler salerooms.
