= Murmur (2019 film) =

2019 Canadian drama film

- Directed by: Heather Young
- Written by: Heather Young
- Produced by: Martha Cooley
- Starring: Shan MacDonald; Andria Edwards
- Cinematography: Jeffery Wheaton
- Edited by: Heather Young
- Music by: Sarah DeCourcy
- Production company: Houseplant Pictures
- Release date: September 6, 2019 (TIFF)
- Running time: 84 minutes
- Country: Canada
- Language: English

Murmur is a Canadian docufiction film, directed by Heather Young and released in 2019. Young's full-length directorial debut, the film stars a cast of largely non-professional actors and centres on Donna (Shan MacDonald), a lonely, alcoholic woman who is ordered to perform community service in an animal shelter after being arrested for drunk driving; when she adopts an older dog from the shelter to save him from being put down, she finds new meaning and purpose in her life but becomes obsessed with saving animals to the detriment of her own well-being.

Produced by Houseplant Films, the film was funded in part by Telefilm Canada and the Nova Scotia Film and Television Production Incentive Fund.

The film premiered at the 2019 Toronto International Film Festival, where it was announced as the winner of the FIPRESCI Discovery Prize. In December 2019, the film was named to TIFF's annual year-end Canada's Top Ten list.

In January 2020, the film won the Narrative Feature Grand Jury Prize at the Slamdance Film Festival. The film won the John Dunning Best First Feature Award at the 8th Canadian Screen Awards in 2020.
