= Our Fathers =

Our Fathers can refer to:

- Our Fathers (novel), a 1999 novel by Scottish novelist Andrew O'Hagan
- Our Fathers (Wait novel), a 2020 novel by British novelist Rebecca Wait
- Our Fathers (film), a 2005 American TV film

== See also ==
- Our Father (disambiguation)
