= Gavin Baird =

Canadian filmmaker

Gavin Baird is a Métis filmmaker from Canada. He is most noted for his 2025 short film Klee, which was named to the Toronto International Film Festival's annual year-end Canada's Top Ten list for 2025.

From Saskatchewan, he made his feature film debut with The Big Gust in 2018. He subsequently released the feature films Begonia, The Caring Only Cry at Night and A Storm Blows Over.

In 2023 he won the award for Outstanding Feature Film Producer at the Reelworld Film Festival for A Storm Blows Over, and was a recipient of the memorial Jeff Barnaby Grant from the ImagineNATIVE Film and Media Arts Festival in 2023 for Klee.

== Filmography ==
- The Option - 2016
- Autumn's Breeze - 2017
- Four in a Blanket - 2018
- The Big Gust - 2018
- Behind the Windowpane - 2019
- Begonia - 2019
- My Masterpiece - 2020
- The Caring Only Cry at Night - 2020
- Jesus Issues - 2023
- 8th Street Menace - 2024
- A Storm Blows Over - 2023
- Klee - 2025
