= Our Father (2025 film) =

2025 film by Goran Stanković

- Festival poster
- Serbian: Oče naš
- Directed by: Goran Stanković
- Screenplay by: Goran Stanković; Dejan Prćić; Ognjen Sviličić; Maja Pelević
- Produced by: Snežana van Houwelingen
- Starring: Vučić Perović; Boris Isaković; Goran Marković; Jasna Žalica; Dado Ćosić; Lazar Tasić
- Cinematography: Dragan Vidović
- Edited by: Marko Ferković
- Music by: Nenad Sinkauz; Alen Sinkauz
- Production companies: This and That Productions; Nightswim; PomPom Film; Dream Factory; Kino; Novi Film
- Release date: 9 September 2025 (TIFF)
- Running time: 90 minutes
- Countries: Serbia; Italy; Croatia; North Macedonia; Montenegro; Bosnia and Herzegovina
- Language: Serbian

Our Father (Serbian: Оче наш / Oče naš) is a 2025 drama film co-written and directed by Goran Stanković. It had its world premiere in the Discovery section of the 50th Toronto International Film Festival on 9 September 2025.

== Cast ==
- Vučić Perović
- Boris Isaković
- Goran Marković
- Jasna Žalica
- Dado Ćosić
- Lazar Tasić
- Toni Mihajlovski
- Nenad Heraković
- Petar Novaković
- Nikola Šurbanović
- Goran Slavić
- Baškim Jakupi
- Tatjana Kecman
- Nataša Miovčić
- Danica Mitić

== Production ==
Principal photography took place from January to February 2024. The film was selected as a European Work in Progress Cologne project in October 2024.

== Release ==
Split Screen acquired the international sales rights to the film in July 2025. The film had its world premiere in the Discovery section of the 50th Toronto International Film Festival on 9 September 2025.
