= A Soft Touch (film) =

- Directed by: Heather Young
- Screenplay by: Heather Young
- Produced by: Heather Young
- Starring: Ellen Pottie; Eileen Carr; Michael Al-Molky; Brittany Lambert; Mohammad Ashari
- Cinematography: Kevin A. Fraser
- Edited by: Heather Young
- Production company: Houseplant Films
- Release date: September 10, 2025 (TIFF)
- Running time: 20 minutes
- Country: Canada
- Language: English

A Soft Touch is a Canadian short drama film, directed by Heather Young and released in 2025. The film stars Ellen Pottie as Ellen, an elderly woman living in a senior's complex who is forced to make difficult sacrifices after being scammed out of a significant amount of money.

The film premiered at the 2025 Toronto International Film Festival, where it received an honorable mention for the Best Canadian Short Film award.

The film was named to the Toronto International Film Festival's annual year-end Canada's Top Ten list for 2025.
