= Chan Hau Chun =

Hong Kong documentary filmmaker and photographer

Chan Hau-chun (Chinese: 陳巧真) is a Hong Kong-based independent documentary filmmaker and photographer. She graduated from the School of Creative Media at City University of Hong Kong.

== Photography career ==
Chan gained early recognition in photography when she won the Audience Favorite Award at the Daido Moriyama Photography Competition during the 2012 Hong Kong International Photo Festival. The following year, she contributed to the "300 Families" photographic exhibition at the Hong Kong International Photo Festival, presenting a body of work documenting individuals experiencing homelessness in Hong Kong.

Cubicle (《一板間》) is a photographic series by Chan Hau-chun. It was featured in the Hong Kong International Photo Festival 2021 (HKIPF 2021). The project, initiated in 2018, employs a group portrait format to document the lives of residents inhabiting subdivided units (劏房) within a building in Cheung Sha Wan, Hong Kong, over several years. The work gained particular significance as its timeline coincided with major societal events in Hong Kong, including periods of social unrest and the COVID-19 pandemic.

Through these documentary images, Chan Hau-chun provides a glimpse into the daily routines of diverse tenants within the confines of these cramped and confined living spaces. The series serves as a visual exploration of the interplay between harsh living conditions and human experiences, examining the relationship between the residential environment and its inhabitants.

== Documentary filmmaking ==
Chan transitioned into documentary filmmaking in 2013 with her debut short film Uncle Fai (輝叔). Her 2014 work 32+4 marked a breakthrough in her film career, earning selection at the Taipei Golden Horse Film Festival for its cinematography and securing the Second Prize at Germany's prestigious International Short Film Festival Oberhausen, along with other international recognition.

Her documentary practice centers on individuals navigating urban existence at society's margins, employing visual storytelling to document the material and emotional textures of metropolitan life. Chan's films have achieved international distribution through screenings at major festivals including the Taipei Golden Horse Awards, Taiwan International Documentary Festival (TIDF), Tokyo's Image Forum Festival, Germany's Oberhausen International Short Film Festival, Hong Kong's ifva Independent Short Film and Video Awards, and the True/False Film Festival in Missouri, USA.

== Selected works ==
=== Films ===
- Uncle Fai (輝叔, 2013) - debut documentary short
- Brother Key (其哥, 2014)
- 32 and 4 (32+4, 2014)
- No Song to Sing (無調人間, 2016)
- Call Me Mrs Chan (叫我陳太, 2017)
- Searching Lau (尋找劉鐵民, 2019)
- Lost a Part Of (失去的部分, 2022)

== Exhibitions ==
=== Solo exhibitions ===
- "Silent Sojourns" (踱步) - WMA, April 18 - June 30, 2024
  - Silent Sojourns is a 2023/2024 art exhibition by Hong Kong artist Chan Hau Chun, commissioned for the WMA's "Home" theme and presented at WMA Space.[1][2] It reconstructs a subdivided residential unit using black-panelled rooms to evoke the cramped conditions of such dwellings, likely referencing buildings in districts like Sham Shui Po. Chan developed the project over five years (2018–2023), intermittently documenting residents while living in a subdivided building in an old district. The exhibition combines video portraits filmed within residents' homes, photography, textual displays, dimmed lighting, and symbolic objects (including an illuminated kitchen basin and an in-progress chess game). A companion publication features Chan's observations, resident reflections, and poetry. Addressing Hong Kong's housing crisis—where vulnerable groups face substandard accommodation—the work avoids overt activism. Instead, it balances depictions of harsh realities with moments of perceived "beauty" and shared solitude. Visitors navigate the labyrinthine installation, mirroring the spatial constraints of subdivided flats to engage with residents' lived experiences. Critics noted the conceptual tension between its social message and artistic presentation.
- "Map of Traces" (記憶座標) - Empty Gallery, June 7 - August 23, 2025
  - "Map of Traces" was a solo exhibition by Hong Kong artist Chan Hau Chun, held at Empty Gallery from June 7 to August 30, 2025. The centerpiece was a 30-minute experimental documentary film of the same name, exploring themes of memory, loss, and survival in Hong Kong amid recent sociopolitical upheavals. The film follows Lau Tit Man, an elderly graffiti artist who, after being arrested for protest-related art, began creating temporary water-based inscriptions on Nathan Road—a historic protest site. Structured in three sections, the film blends personal letters, Google Street View recordings, protest footage, and urban soundscapes, juxtaposing individual and collective memory. It opens with an intimate letter reflecting on silence and displacement, transitions to a digital exploration of Hong Kong, and concludes with fragmented, pixelated imagery—a metaphor for fading history. Chan’s work aligns with diasporic artists like Simon Liu and Tiffany Sia, as well as video-letter pioneer Yau Ching. Rather than direct documentation, Map of Traces engages with affect, ephemerality, and resistance, assembling fragments of lived experience to counter narratives of erasure. Critics, including Delaney Chieyen Holton, praised its sensory collage of melancholic reflection and tender nostalgia, offering a rare, intimate encounter with Hong Kong’s recent past.

=== Group exhibitions ===
==== 2023: "Tsaiyun (Rosy-Cloud) Bridge" (彩雲橋／相忘於江湖) - Hordaland Art Centre, 2023.02.25 - 2023.05.07 ====
- The gallery floor features a five-channel video installation by Chan Hau-chun and Chui Chi-yin, with screens distributed throughout the space. Each monitor presents intimate documentation of a Hong Kong individual's daily life, exploring how their relationships with personal objects and the memories these items hold have been shaped by the context of social movements (A Conversation About Our Undulating Things, 2023).

==== 2019: "A Person's Society" (一个人的社會) - AT CENTER FOR CONTTRMPORARY ART, Guangzhou, China, 2019.6.23 - 201.7.22 ====
- Chan encountered Liu Tiemin while working on a documentary about her family, when she decided to gather additional footage of people experiencing homelessness. Liu became one of the subjects she documented during this expanded scope of filming.

== Archival records ==
The Asia Art Archive currently holds four research records of her work, including:

- Personal publication: Silent Sojourns (《踱步》, 2024)
- Newspaper documentation from Sunday Mingpao (《星期日生活》, October 13, 2013)
- Exhibition catalogue: 300 Families (《300家》, 2013)
- Exhibition catalogue: Drifting Borders (《流動的邊界》, 2018)

== Film Festival ==
Toronto International Film Festival, 25th Edition - Map Of Traces (記憶座標, HK) - World premiere
