= Heather Young (filmmaker) =

Canadian filmmaker

Heather Young is a Canadian filmmaker based in Dartmouth, Nova Scotia.

== Biography ==
Originally from Saint John, New Brunswick, Young is a graduate of the University of New Brunswick and Nova Scotia College of Art and Design (NSCAD).

Her thesis film Dog Girl won the Norman McLaren Award for Best Student Film at the Montreal World Film Festival. Her other short films include Green (2013) and Howard and Jean (2014). Her short Fish received an Honourable Mention for Best Canadian Short at the Vancouver International Film Festival and played at TIFF Canada's Top Ten in 2017. Her short Milk won Best Short Film in the Focus Québec/Canada competition at Festival du nouveau cinéma and also played at TIFF Canada's Top Ten in 2018.

Her feature film debut, Murmur, premiered at the 2019 Toronto International Film Festival, where it won the FIPRESCI Discovery Prize. In December 2019, it was named to TIFF's annual year-end Canada's Top Ten list of the year's best Canadian films. It also won the John Dunning Award for Best First Feature at the Canadian Screen Awards.

== Filmography ==
=== Short films ===
- Dog Girl - 2009
- A Night Out - 2011
- Green - 2013
- Howard and Jean - 2014
- Fish - 2016, winner of the Screen Nova Scotia short film award
- Milk - 2017
- A Soft Touch - 2025

=== Feature films ===
- Murmur - 2019
- There, There - 2024

== Accolades ==
- Norman McLaren Award for Best Overall Student Film, 2009 Montreal World Film Festival (Dog Girl)
- Best Canadian Short, 2011 Silver Wave Festival (A Night Out)
- Canada's Top Ten shorts of 2016, Toronto International Film Festival (Fish)
- Best Short Film, 2017 Screen Nova Scotia Awards (Fish)
- Best Canadian or Québécois Short Film, 2017 Festival du nouveau cinema (Milk)
- FIPRESCI Discovery Prize, 2019 Toronto International Film Festival (Murmur)
- John Dunning Best First Feature Film Award, 2020 Canadian Screen Awards (Murmur)
- Best Feature Film, 2020 Lucca Film Festival (Murmur)
- Grand Jury Prize, 2020 Slamdance Film Festival (Murmur)
