= Janine Marchessault =

Canadian professor

- Occupations: Professor of Cinema and Media Studies

Academic work
- Institutions: York University
- Notable works: Marshall McLuhan: Cosmic Media (2005) Fluid Screens, Expanded Cinema (2007) 3D Cinema and Beyond (2014) Reimagining Cinema: Film at Expo 67 (2014) Cartographies of Place: Navigating the Urban (2014)
- Website: janinemarchessault.com

Janine Marchessault FRSC is a professor of Cinema and Media Studies and Canada Research Chair (2003-2013) at York University in Toronto, Canada. Her main fields of research are Ecologies of Media and Mediation, (sub)urban cultures, the works of Marshall McLuhan, contemporary art exhibitions, Expo 67, artists' cultures, new media technologies, media archives, city and its sustainability issues. She is also a Trudeau Fellow.

== Career ==
Janine Marchessault received a Bachelor of Arts degree in Communication Studies in 1982 from Concordia University and a Master of Arts degree in Film Studies in 1987 from York University. She obtained her Ph.D. in Social and Political Thought from York University in 1992. In 1985 she started teaching as a lecturer at Ryerson University. In 1992 she served as a postdoctoral fellow in the Department of English at McGill University, where in 1994 she became an assistant professor. In 1998 she joined the Faculty of Fine Arts at York University, where in 2000 she was appointed an associate professor in the Department of Film. In 2012 she was made full professor of cinema and media studies.

== Honours ==
In 2003 and in 2008, Marchessault was nominated as a Tier 2 Canada Research Chair in Art, Digital Media and Globalization held at York University. In 2012, she received the prestigious Trudeau Fellowship to support her research and curation in the area of public art and urban cultures.

In 2016, she was elected a Fellow of the Royal Society of Canada.

== Works and Research ==
From 1997 to 1999, Marchessault acted as a president of the Film Studies Association of Canada (FSAC). Over the past two decades, she has written articles on Quebec cinema, feminist cinema and Canadian cinema. She is a founding editor of Public, a journal of art, culture and ideas. She published widely on film, video and new media technologies. She is the author of Marshall McLuhan: Cosmic Media (Sage, 2005) and co-editor of Fluid Screens, Expanded Cinema (UTP, 2007), 3D Cinema and Beyond (Intellect, 2014), Reimagining Cinema: Film at Expo 67 (McGill-Queens, 2014), and Cartographies of Place: Navigating the Urban (McGill-Queens, 2014). From 2013 to 2015, she acted as the inaugural director of Sensorium: Centre for Digital Arts & Technology that supports cross-disciplinary work and collaborative research at York University. She is also director of Visible City Project + Archive that examines how new media technologies influence artists' cultures in cities of Toronto, Havana and Helsinki.

== Curation ==
As a member of the Public Access Curatorial Collective, Marchessault co-curated numerous large-scale art exhibitions in Toronto: Being on Time (2000), The Leona Drive Project (2009), Museum for the End of the World (2012) and Land|Slide: Possible Futures (2013). The latter was named as one of the Canada's top "10 Shows to See This Fall" by Canadian Art magazine and blogTO, and was invited to exhibit at the 2013-14 Hong Kong-Shenzhen Bi-City Biennale of Urbanism/Architecture. In 2016, she started a new curatorial art project Houses on Pengarth (HOP) in the Toronto's Lawrence Heights housing area. The HOP project involves transforming several row houses at Pengarth Court into a multi-year experimental art space.
