= Peter Rafael Bloch =

American journalist

Peter Bloch
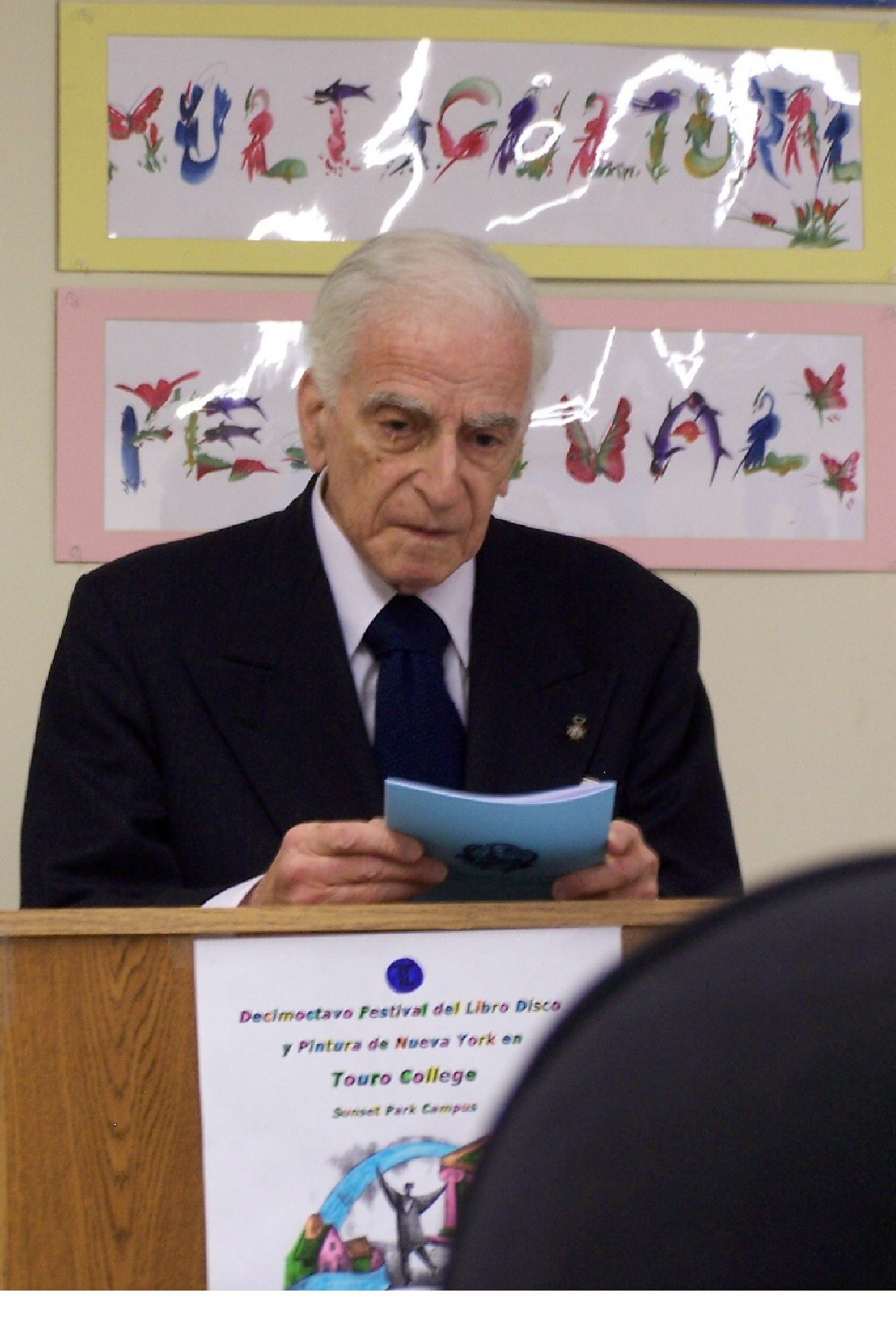
- Bloch in 2008.
- Born: Peter Rafael Bloch; October 19, 1921
- Died: July 31, 2008 (aged 86)
- Known for: Art Historian, writer, journalist
- Notable work: Once Grandes Pintores, When I was Pierre Boulanger, Figures of My Century

Peter Rafael Bloch (October 19, 1921 – July 31, 2008) was an art historian, writer and journalist and an expert of Puerto Rican music and art. He was fluent in four languages. Living in New York since 1949, he kept in contact with his home town Frankfurt am Main which he frequently visited in the last 14 years of his life. As time witness of the Third Reich he tirelessly spoke to the students of his former high school (Wöhlerschule), and gave lectures and interviews in numerous Frankfurt institutions.

== Life ==
=== In Frankfurt am Main (1921–1939) ===
Peter Bloch was born in Frankfurt am Main, Germany, to a family of medical doctors and Spanish-Jewish scholars. His grandfather James Israel (1848–1926) was a pioneer in modern urological and renal surgery in Berlin. Peter lived with his family in Lindenstrasse 39 in the Westend of Frankfurt am Main, surrounded by great works of art, rare books and antique furniture that – packed for shipping – were confiscated by NS authorities in Rotterdam in 1944 and never recovered. His father Dr. med. Arthur Bloch – a former assistant of his grandfather's – was Senior urological consultant in a Frankfurt hospital before he was dismissed in 1933 due to the NS laws. In 1939 Peter Bloch graduated from the Philanthropin, a renowned Jewish high school in Frankfurt am Main which he had attended since 1936 after being forced to leave his former high school "Wöhler Realgymnasium" (today Wöhlerschule), then in the Frankfurt Westend. In spring 1939, some weeks after graduating, Peter Bloch emigrated to England.

=== In England and Belgium (1939–1942) ===
Peter Bloch studied Hispanic history and culture since his youth. His art teacher considered him a most promising student. However, it was his very love of art that made him realize that he was not called upon to be a painter, but a writer. In 1939, while he stayed in London, his parents had to go into exile in Belgium. England had offered exile to his father, but not to the family which also included Luise Fölsche, called "Lite", his mother Else Bloch's nanny and companion since the 1890s. England's offer of asylum was rejected and in late August 1939 Peter Bloch joined his family in Belgium. He started to study history at the university of Brussels. After the German invasion of Belgium in May 1940, he joined the underground resistance and handed out summaries of BBC radio broadcasts. If found out, he would have faced certain death. By the summer of 1942 a time of terror began for the Jews in Belgium. In June 1942 a warning came from the Jewish Council in Brussels of Peter's imminent deportation. His father bought him a false identity card bearing the name Pierre Boulanger. When his parents received the written order for his deportation on July 16, 1942, Peter had already crossed the Franco-Swiss border with a smuggler on July 11, 1942. In Belgium his parents found separate hiding-places. On August 13, 1943, his father was captured by the Gestapo and on the same day hanged by the SS in the Dossin Barracks (transit camp) at Mechelen.

=== In Switzerland (July 1942 – May 1945) ===
By correspondence his parents had mobilized all their Swiss connections in Peter's favour. He was granted asylum and interned. Eventually he was allowed to study in the University of Geneva. However, during vacations he had to return to a labour camp. In the book When I was Pierre Boulanger, Peter Bloch recalled, „The conditions of internment were very bad in Bellechasse prison and better in the labor camps where the Swiss used refugees as slave labor“. By 1944, Bloch was anxious to return to his mother and Luise Fölsche who had been paralyzed by a stroke in 1943. Mother and son reunited in Brussels on May 30, 1945; "Lite" had died two weeks earlier. In his book When I was Pierre Boulanger Peter Bloch said: „Today it still hurts me that I did not see her (Lite) again. She had wanted so much for me to come back in time. My mother used to refer to the three of us as 'Three birds on a perch' in World War II – and our closeness to each other, which is everlasting. Now there's only one melancholy bird left on the Perch.“

=== In New York (1949–2008) ===
Peter Bloch arrived in New York with his mother Else Israel Bloch (1891–1988) in 1949. His half-brother Werner Czapski (1912–1972), an engineer afflicted with MS, joined them later. Bloch earned a living writing for European newspapers and became a U.S. citizen in 1955. His mother having instilled the tradition of respect, admiration and pride which Spanish Jews feel for Hispanic culture made it natural for Peter Bloch to get immersed in Puerto Rican life in New York. Josephine Burgos, a cousin of Julia de Burgos, acquainted him with the community at large and with her own family. In an interview ("Daily News", 1974) he said: „I heard a lot of foolish and dangerous talk about them, even from other minorities who should know better. I felt it important to tell their story, why? Because no one else would.“ Bloch believed that what the Puerto Ricans needed most was a sense of their own worth as heirs to a rich culture, that they had every reason to be proud of their heritage. In his book, La-Le-Lo-Lai – Puerto Rican music and its performers, he advised: „For those who want to acquire some notions about the contribution to the civilization of the Americas and of the Hispanic nations Puerto Rican Music is one of the best venues of approach; for the message of music is universal, cosmic, and transcends any language barrier.“ He said, „Whenever I visit Puerto Rico I feel as if it were my own country.“

With great affection, devotion and without remuneration Peter Bloch produced concerts, recitals, poetry readings, radio programs (WNYC-AM), pioneered art exhibitions (New York & Germany), wrote books and articles for countless magazines, established a Puerto Rican Library & Museum at La Hermosa Christian Church, founded the "Association for Puerto Rican-Hispanic Culture" (1965) and the "Rafael Hernández Festival" (1967). Peter Bloch was named Trustee of the "Alfred Fahndrich Santos Collection". This Collection was on exhibition at the "Museum of Hispanic Contemporary Art", and now resides at "Eugenio Maria de Hostos Community College" of the City University of New York. For his selfless advocacy on behalf of the Puerto Rican-Hispanic Culture, Peter Bloch was honoured frequently. In 1955 he was honoured by the "League of Belgian and allied Patriots". He also received 3 recognition awards from Boricua College. He was also the recipient of the Key to the Capital City of San Juan, Puerto Rico (1964), was made a Knight of the Order of Isabella the Catholic (1969) and was awarded the Gold Medal from Société Académique Fondée En 1915 Paris France "Arts-Sciences-Lettres" (1985).

Peter Bloch was the United States representative of the Academic Society "Arts-Sciences-Lettres" of Paris. He lectured at universities in Madrid, Venezuela and throughout North and South America. He was also a writer for "Poesía Magazine" and a judge for the ACE Awards.

Johann Wolfgang von Goethe and Albert Schweitzer were influences on Peter Bloch's formation. He used to refer to Goethe as the poet of German thought. He embraced Schweitzer's postulate that civilization and culture are the same – that culture is an ethical value.

== Works ==
All of Bloch's written works are currently out of print.

=== Books ===
- La-Le-Lo-Lai – Puerto Rican Music and its Performers (1973)
- Painting and Sculpture of the Puerto Ricans (1978)
- Music of the Hispanic Antilles, Dominican Republic, Cuba & Puerto Rico (1981)
- De van Eyck a Chagall. Once grandes pintores. Caracas 1987
- 1492 – From a distant star (1991)
- The Emilia Conde Story – A dramatized biography in concert (1991, 2. ed. 1994)
- La-Le-Lo-Lai – The story of Puerto Rican Music (2000)
- Sefarad. Die spanischen Juden des Mittelalters und ihre Kultur (2000)
- Der Salon meiner Mutter – Erinnerungen (2001). (English translation: My Mother's Salon – Recollections, 2011)
- When I was Pierre Boulanger. 1942 – A diary in times of terror (2002)
- Figures of my century. The poet's refuge New York City (2006)
- Meine Lehrer (2008)

=== Essays and Interviews ===
- Aus meiner Schulzeit …. Abgegangen 1936 aus U II. In: 25 Jahre neue Wöhlerschule am Dornbusch, 1957–1982. Herausgeber: Gerhard Otte. (1982)
- Erinnerungen an James Israel. In: Rolf Winau (Herausgeber): James Israel, 1848–1926. Wiesbaden 1983, S. 7–95.
- Wie ich das Pogrom erlebte. In: ... dass wir nicht erwünscht waren. Novemberpogrom 1938 in Frankfurt am Main. Berichte und Dokumente (1993)
- "Auf wundersame Weise dem Tode entronnen …" (1994). Gespräch mit Peter Bloch (New York) im Historischen Museum Frankfurt am Main
