= Made You Look: A True Story About Fake Art =

- Directed by: Barry Avrich
- Written by: Barry Avrich; Melissa Hood
- Produced by: Barry Avrich; Caitlin Cheddie
- Cinematography: Ken Ng
- Edited by: Tiffany Beaudin
- Production company: Melbar Entertainment Group
- Distributed by: Fremantle; CBC Television
- Release date: April 16, 2020 (Hot Docs)
- Running time: 94 minutes
- Country: Canada
- Language: English

Made You Look: A True Story About Fake Art is a 2020 documentary by Barry Avrich about a notable art forgery court case involving Knoedler.

It is one of two documentaries on the subject, alongside 2019's Driven to Abstraction. In 2020, Yahoo reported that Melbar Entertainment Group was working on a feature film adaption of the story.

The film was slated to premiere at the 2020 Hot Docs Canadian International Documentary Festival. Following the festival's cancellation due to the COVID-19 pandemic in Canada, it instead premiered on CBC Television as an episode of the special series Hot Docs at Home.

Avrich published a book on the matter in 2025: The Devil Wars Rothko: Inside the Art Scandal that Rocked the World.
