= Our Father (1953 film) =

1953 film by Emilio Gómez Muriel

- Directed by: Emilio Gómez Muriel
- Written by: Julio Alejandro; Teódulo Bustos; Emilio Gómez Muriel
- Produced by: Modesto Pascó; Emilio Tuero
- Starring: Carlos López Moctezuma; Evita Muñoz ("Chachita"); Andrea Palma
- Cinematography: Ezequiel Carrasco
- Edited by: Fernando Martínez
- Music by: Gonzalo Curiel
- Production company: Argel Films
- Release date: 28 October 1953
- Running time: 89 minutes
- Country: Mexico
- Language: Spanish

Our Father (Spanish: Padre nuestro) is a 1953 Mexican drama film directed by Emilio Gómez Muriel and starring Carlos López Moctezuma, Evita Muñoz ("Chachita") and Andrea Palma.

== Cast ==
- Carlos López Moctezuma as Don Carlos Molina
- Evita Muñoz ("Chachita") as Elisa Molina
- Andrea Palma as Doña Adriana de Molina
- Irma Dorantes as María Elena Molina
- Miguel Córcega as Alberto
- Raúl Farell as Federico Molina
- Alberto Mariscal as Enrique Molina
- Alfonso Mejía as Eduardo Molina
- Luis Aceves Castañeda as El maestro
- José Baviera as Miembro consejo banco
- Alberto Carrière as El francés
- Enrique Díaz 'Indiano' as Don Francisco Fernández
- José Pidal as Miembro del consejo
- Joaquín Roche as Empleado aserradero
- José Luis Rojas as Antonio
- Mario Sevilla as Comisario
- Roberto Spriu as Doctor

== Bibliography ==
- María Luisa Amador. Cartelera cinematográfica, 1950-1959. UNAM, 1985.
