= The Road Between Us: The Ultimate Rescue =

- Festival poster
- Directed by: Barry Avrich
- Produced by: Barry Avrich; Mark Selby
- Edited by: Dave Kennedy
- Distributed by: Cineplex Pictures
- Release date: 10 September 2025 (TIFF)
- Running time: 95 minutes
- Country: Canada

The Road Between Us: The Ultimate Rescue is a 2025 Canadian documentary film directed by Barry Avrich. The film depicts Noam Tibon, a former Israeli general, rescuing his family and others from Hamas during the October 7 attacks. It premiered at the Toronto International Film Festival on 10 September 2025, and was released in US and Canada theatres on 3 October. The film is distributed by Cineplex in Canada and Forston Consulting in the US.

The film received mostly positive reviews from critics and it won the People's Choice Award, Documentary at the TIFF festival in 2025.

== Premise ==
The film follows retired Israeli general Noam Tibon's decision on 7 October 2023 to drive down south from Tel Aviv to rescue his son Amir Tibon and his young family from kibbutz Nahal Oz, near the northern Gaza Strip. During Hamas’ attack on Nahal Oz over a quarter of residents were killed or taken hostage. Amir, his wife, and two small children were hiding in the safe room of their family home hearing the shooting and shouting all around them, including shots taken in their living room. At 4 PM, close to twelve hours after they began hiding out, Noam and his wife Gali arrived to save them together with the army and other family members.

== Production ==
After seeing retired Israeli General Noam Tibon featured on 60 Minutes, Canadian filmmaker Barry Avrich decided to produce a documentary based on his story and contacted him directly about the film. Avrich didn't regard himself as a "political documentary filmmaker" but felt drawn to Tibon's character and actions during the October 7 attacks. He described the film as more of a "thriller". In another interview with The Hollywood Reporter on 8 September, Avrich denied that it was a political film, saying it was "wrapped in the flag of a family, not a country". Avrich described Tibon's personal mission to save his family during the 7 October attacks as a universal story of parental courage rather than a political statement, and emphasised his intent was not to take a position on the Israeli–Palestinian conflict.

The documentary combines Noam's commentary with archival material, including security camera recordings from the kibbutz and publicly available Hamas bodycam footage. Avrich stated he did not intent to "horrify people" with the worst of the footage he had reviewed, but selected footage that "retraced Noam's steps" of what he saw during his mission. When the film was initially pulled from its Toronto International Film Festival (TIFF) premiere due to alleged issues with legal clearance of the footage, Avrich argued that all of the footage was already publicly available and suggested the notion of requiring Hamas footage clearance came from an internal lawyer. Avrich attributed the film's reinstatement to "global pressure".

Despite the film's reinstatement, Avirch stated he "did not feel exhilarated at the end", describing the negotiations with TIFF as protracted and marked by compromises proposed by the festival, which he declined in favour of insisting on his original terms for the screening. He also questioned why the dispute had arisen in the first place. Avrich also noted that TIFF was founded with a documentary about student activists, and believed the founders would have been "very proud" of a "controversial film" premiering at TIFF.

== Release ==
On 13 August 2025, the Toronto International Film Festival (TIFF) withdrew its invitation to premiere the film, citing concerns that the filmmakers lacked the rights to use Hamas' footage of the attacks. The festival also stated it aimed to avoid a "potential threat of significant disruption" related to the screening. The filmmaking team told Deadline they were shocked by the decision but said they would still release the film.

The decision was decried by the Auschwitz Jewish Center Foundation, with its director Jack Simony saying it was "the moral equivalent of asking Holocaust survivors to secure Adolf Hitler's written consent to show Nazi-shot footage of concentration camps". An open letter signed by more than 1000 entertainment professionals of the Creative Community for Peace alleged that the move was "appeasing anti-Israel and antisemitic activists' intent to silence Jewish voices". On the subsequent day, TIFF chief executive officer Cameron Bailey reversed its decision, saying that he would work with Avirch to "find a resolution to satisfy important safety, legal, and programming concerns". Bailey denied allegations of censorship.

The film was released on 10 September, and its TIFF premiere was met with protests. The film was given a theatrical release in the United States and Canada on 3 October, shortly before the second anniversary of the attacks. Cineplex and Forston Consulting are handling the film's distribution in Canada and the US, respectively.

== Reception ==
=== Critical response ===
On the review aggregator website Rotten Tomatoes, 81% of 16 critics' reviews are positive, with an average rating of 8/10. Metacritic, which uses a weighted average, assigned the film a score of 49 out of 100, based on six critics, indicating "mixed or average" reviews.

Daniel Fienberg of The Hollywood Reporter described the film as "undeniably gripping", regarding it as "real-life version" of Taken. However, he argued that its attempt to frame itself as an "apolitical" documentary is ultimately impossible. He felt while the film echoed widespread frustration over the Israeli government and military's unpreparedness during the attack, the film offered no explanations as it avoided an investigative approach, leaving that frustration "haunting and empty". Pat Mullen of POV Magazine also praised the film, noting how Noam's story "undeniably unfolded with heart-pounding intensity". However, he criticised the narrow scope of the documentary, noting it avoided mentioning Palestine besides frequent references to terrorists, and a limited attempt to question the IDF response to the attacks.

Robert Abele of the Los Angeles Times felt the "action-thriller approach" narrows the story's scope "within simplified parameters" as it attempted to avoid the broader context of the Israeli–Palestinian conflict and the subsequent Gaza war, and wrote that the film did "disservice to a much broader tragedy". Ben Kenigsberg of The New York Times criticised the film as a "shoddy piece of moviemaking", taking issue with the film's "slickness" that "cheapens the most harrowing recollections".

=== Accolades ===
The film won the TIFF People's Choice Award, Documentary.

Award	Date of ceremony	Category	Recipient(s)	Result	Ref.
Cinema for Peace Awards	16 February 2026	Cinema for Peace Dove for The Most Valuable Documentary of the Year	The Road Between Us	Pending	
