= Barry Avrich =

Canadian film director and producer

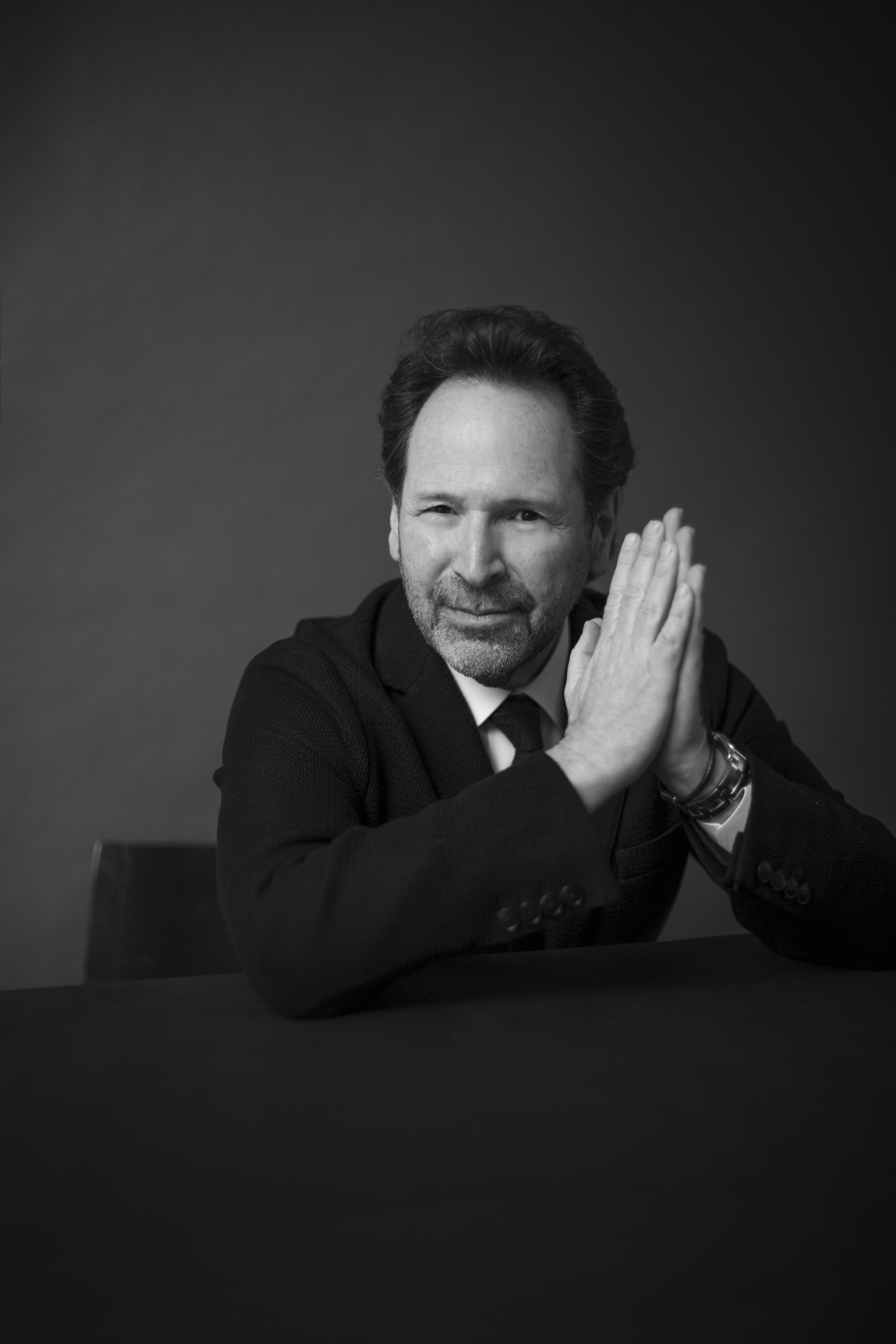
- Born: Barry Michael Avrich; May 9, 1963 (age 63)
- Occupations: Filmmaker, author, marketing executive

Barry Michael Avrich (/ˈeɪvrɪtʃ/ AYV-ritch; born May 9, 1963) is a Canadian film director, film producer, author, marketing executive, and arts philanthropist. Avrich's film career has included critically acclaimed films about the entertainment business including The Last Mogul about film producer Lew Wasserman (2005), Glitter Palace about the Motion Picture Country Home (2005), and Guilty Pleasure about the Vanity Fair columnist and author Dominick Dunne (2004) and Made You Look about the largest art fraud in America, 2020.

In addition, Avrich produced the Gemini-nominated television special Caesar and Cleopatra (2009) with Christopher Plummer. Avrich also produced Canada's Sports Hall of Fame Awards (2015), as well as the Canadian Screen Awards (2015-2017) and the Scotiabank Giller Prize (2015-current).

Besides films, Avrich has authored three books and one play as well as supporting many leading cultural institutions including the Toronto International Film Festival and the Stratford Festival of Canada. Avrich was responsible for creating the Daniels Hollywood Movie Theatre at the Hospital for Sick Children in Toronto, Ontario. Avrich won the Ernst & Young Entrepreneur of the Year Award in 2008. Avrich was awarded The Horatio Alger Award in 2025.

In 2016, Avrich published his memoir, Moguls, Monsters and Madmen. In 2025, Avrich published, the Devil Wears Rothko.

== Early life ==
Avrich was born into a Jewish family in Montreal, Quebec, the son of Irving Avrich, a garment industry executive, and Faye Avrich, a housewife. His parents immersed him in the arts as a child. In school, Avrich produced talent shows and started experimenting with films. While attending Vanier College, he gravitated to the film program and while there, he produced many films. In 1980, he moved to Toronto where he continued to study film, art and theatre at both Ryerson Polytechnical Institute and the University of Toronto. While in school, Avrich started Rent-A-Fan Club, a company that offered "celebrity status" to people as a novelty by using his fellow acting students to create fan clubs. Soon after graduating, Avrich made two short films that would get him noticed: The King of Yorkville (1985) was a satirical parody of the 1980s dating scene that was picked up by local television stations in Canada, and The Madness of Method (1995), featuring M. Emmet Walsh, won a Gold Medal at the Bilbao International Festival of Documentary and Short Films.

== Career ==
=== Film ===
Avrich created Melbar Entertainment Group in 1998 to produce documentary films. Avrich has directed and produced many acclaimed documentaries and television specials. His focus is generally on the entertainment industry and television specials, including the music special, Bowfire for PBS (2008), One x One Gala (2007) for CTV and Caesar and Cleopatra (2009) for Bravo and CTV. Other films have chronicled defense attorney Edward Greenspan and the Rolling Stones promoter Michael Cohl, Winston Churchill, and David Steinberg. His 2010 film Unauthorized: The Harvey Weinstein Project was sold to IFC's Sundance Now channel in February 2011.

In 2017, Avrich announced plans for a docuseries on American financier and convicted sex offender Jeffrey Epstein; however, he decided to scrap the project after Epstein's suicide in August, 2019, claiming the topic to be "too distasteful". In 2018, Avrich directed and produced The Reckoning, the first "#metoo documentary on Harvey Weinstein, which premiered at Hot Docs Film Festival and was sold to CBC and Hulu. In 2018, Avrich produced and directed an acclaimed and award-winning documentary, Prosecuting Evil, on Nuremberg prosecutor Ben Ferencz, which was sold to Netflix. In 2019, Avrich directed and produced Off The Record, a biography of Grammy award-winning producer and composer David Foster, for Crave and Netflix, which premiered at TIFF. In 2020, Avrich produced Made You Look, a documentary about the infamous Knoedler Gallery art fraud scandal which was sold to Netflix.

In 2021, Avrich directed and produced Oscar Peterson: Black + White, a docu-concert on jazz icon Oscar Peterson that had its world premiere at TIFF on September 12, 2021. In 2022, Avrich began production on three new documentaries: Without Precedent (on Supreme Court Justice Rosalie Abella), Sacrilege (narrated by Brian Cox), and The Palm Beach Diaries.

The Variety critic Robert Koehler said of The Last Mogul (2005), a documentary about Lew Wasserman that it "draws a full and balanced measure of the man, from his stratospheric rise to a remarkably humbling fall, and includes as thorough a study of the super-agent-turned-mogul's shady ties with organized crime as any feature docu could hope to muster."

In 2026, it was reported that Avrich will direct Shadow Man: Inside the Secret World of Larry Gagosian, a documentary examining the career and influence of art dealer Larry Gagosian and the operations of the global Gagosian gallery network.

== Awards ==
In April 2022, Avrich’s film received 4 Canadian Screen Awards including Best Documentary Program for Oscar Peterson: Black + White.

When accepting the award online during the COVID-19 pandemic, his remarks ended with the following statement:

"There are so many Black stories in Canada that need to be told. It doesn't matter who tells them, we just need to tell 'em." At least 11 Canadian film-sector organizations issued prompt statements condemning these remarks, including the Black Screen Office, whose statement called out Avrich's "supreme disrespect of our history" that "cleverly weaponizes the non-Black community" Reelworld Film Festival, whose statement called out Avrich's words as "reflective of a past system that we are working to change"; and, without naming Avrich, the Academy of Canadian Cinema & Television that is responsible for the Canadian Screen Awards. Avrich apologized the next day and said that he had misspoke and that of course, it matters who tells stories."

Avrich’s statement was supported by opera star Measha Brueggergosman-Lee — who appears in Oscar Peterson: Black + White and Rosemary Sadlier, former president of the Ontario Black History Society.

Brueggergosman-Lee said she feels “we need more warriors in the fight, not less” when it comes to telling racialized narratives. She also called Avrich “an unflinching and uncompromising advocate for stories that need (and deserve) to be told.”

Sadlier asked: “What of the need to ‘just tell the stories’ when so many of them have been overlooked or purposely excluded? What about when we fail to acknowledge the actions, the history that people are making right now? What about room for different approaches/perspectives?”

Avrich added that he’s “committed to continuing to be a strong supporter of redressing the imbalance that has historically existed and continues to be a challenge for Black and other traditionally under represented creators. That is what matters and that is what I intended to say in my acceptance speech.” That same year, artist and director Ngozi Paul hired Avrich to produce FreeUp! The Emancipation Day Special, a television special chronicling the emancipation movement in Canada.

In 2025, his documentary film The Road Between Us: The Ultimate Rescue, about the efforts of a retired Israeli Defense Forces general to rescue hostages from the October 7 attacks, was disinvited from the 2025 Toronto International Film Festival after Festival Claimed the producers failed to comply with the festival's rules around copyright, specifically saying that had not cleared Hamas terrorism footage, which require either proof that all footage in the film has been cleared for use by its copyright holders, or a legal statement indemnifying the festival against liability in the event of a copyright lawsuit.

The ultimate disinvitation, according to Deadline, came over the legal clearance and identification of footage of the attack that was filmed by Hamas.

The producers countered that only was the festival indemnified as the festival was covered in the production’s errors and omission policy, Hamas footage was designated as “fair use”. After massive outrage and push back, the festival later reinvited the film to be shown as an official selection. Cameron Bailey, the festival's CEO, said that it's "unequivocally false" the film was being censored. The film went on to win the Peoples Choice Award.

=== Business ===
Avrich began a marketing career in 1985 at Borden Advertising where he worked on national campaigns for the Canadian original production of Les Misérables and Miss Saigon. In 1989, Avrich joined Echo Advertising where he became partner and eventually CEO. While at Echo, Avrich and his staff developed award-winning international campaigns for such clients such as the Toronto International Film Festival, the Rolling Stones, American Express, Sprint and for Broadway productions such as Ragtime, Show Boat, Fosse, Kiss of the Spider Woman and Canadian productions of The Phantom of the Opera, Cats and Les Misérables. Avrich left Echo in 2005 after it was sold to a UK-based marketing firm and he started a boutique advertising agency.

== Filmography ==
- The King of Yorkville, 1987
- The Madness of Method, 1996
- Unforgettable: 100 years Remembered, 1998
- Glitter Palace, 2002
- Guilty Pleasure, 2002
- A Criminal Mind, 2005
- Satisfaction, 2006
- City Lights, 2002
- The Madness of King Richard, 2003
- The Last Mogul, 2005
- One x One Gala, 2007
- Bowfire, 2008
- Citizen Cohl, 2008
- The Ultimate Jew, 2009
- Caesar and Cleopatra, 2009
- Amerika Idol, 2009
- Unauthorized: The Harvey Weinstein Story, 2010
- The Tempest, 2010
- An Unlikely Obsession: Churchill and the Jews, 2011
- Show Stopper: The Theatrical Life of Garth Drabinsky, 2012
- Filthy Gorgeous: The Bob Guccione Story, 2013
- Quality Balls The David Steinberg Story, 2013
- Red Alert, 2014
- King Lear, 2015
- Antony and Cleopatra, 2015
- King John, 2015
- Women Who Act, 2015
- The Man Who Shot Hollywood, 2015 (short)
- The Taming of the Shrew, 2016
- Canadian Screen Awards, 2016 (television)
- Hamlet, 2016
- The Scotia Giller Prize Broadcast, 2016 (television)
- Macbeth, 2016
- Blurred Lines, 2017
- Prosecuting Evil: The Extraordinary World of Ben Ferencz, 2018
- David Foster: Off the Record, 2019
- Made You Look: A True Story About Fake Art, 2020
- Howie Mandel: But, Enough About Me, 2020
- Reversal of Fortune: The Unraveling of Turkey's Democracy, 2020
- Othello, 2020
- Merry Wives of Windsor, 2020
- Oscar Peterson: Black + White, 2021
- The Talented Mr. Rosenberg, 2021
- Sacrilege, 2022
- Three Tall Women, 2022
- Free Up!, 2022
- Without Precedent: The Supreme Life of Rosalie Abella, 2023
- The Road Between Us: The Ultimate Rescue, 2025
- This Above All: The Theatrical Life of Antoni Cimolino, 2026
- Darlene Love: I Know Where I've Been, 2026
