= Tehran International Short Film Festival =

Annual film festival in Iran

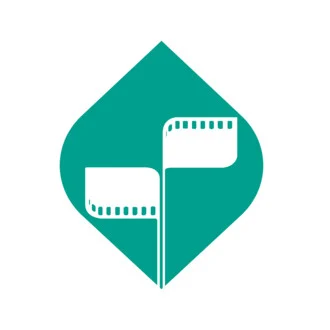
- Location: Tehran, Iran
- Founded: 1983; 43 years ago
- Awards: Grand Prix; Best Fiction Short; Best Documentary; Best Animation; Best Experimental Short; Best AI Short; Emerging Horizons Award
- Hosted by: Iranian Youth Cinema Society
- Artistic director: Behrooz Shoaibi
- Website: www.tisff.ir/english

Tehran International Short Film Festival (TISFF) is a film festival held in Tehran every year in October with a focus on short films.

Considered the most prestigious film festival in Iran, the festival was first founded in 1983. Since 2020, it has become a qualifying festival for the Academy Awards and the winner of the Grand Prix becomes eligible for consideration by members of the AMPAS.

Organized by the Iranian Youth Cinema Society, Tehran International Short Film Festival has acted as a global platforms for emerging talents from all around the world. Previous winners at various editions of the festival include internationally-acclaimed artists such as Academy Award nominees Jasmila Žbanić, Ashvin Kumar, Patrick Vollrath, Jérémy Comte, Meryam Joobeur, Bill Morrison, Golden Globe nominee Payal Kapadia (filmmaker), and Academy Award winners Hossein Molayemi and Shirin Sohani.

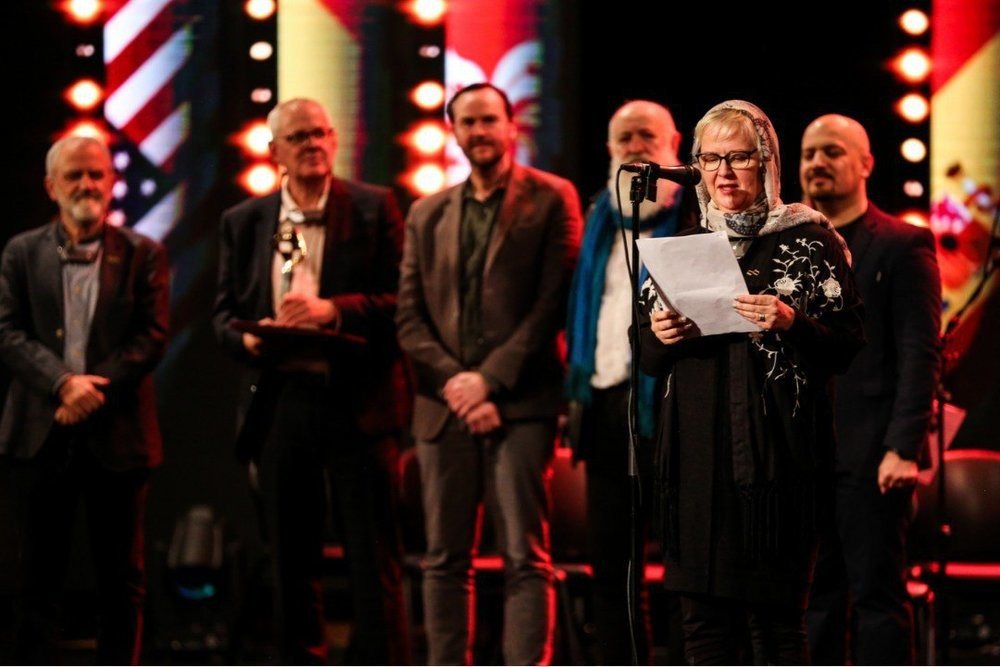
International Competition Jury at the 35th Tehran International Short Film Festival

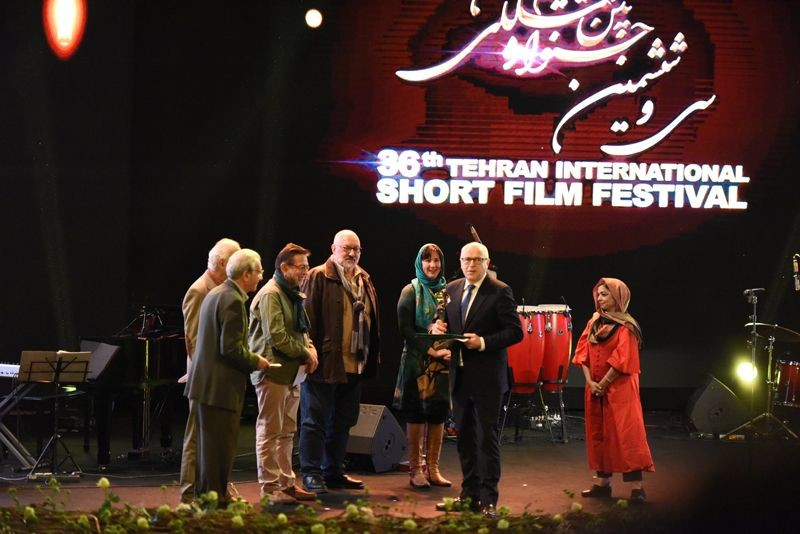
36th Tehran International Short Film Festival

== History ==
In 1983 the festival was first created as a section of the Fajr Film Festival showcasing 8mm and 16mm films. The event then became its own independent festival and was subsequently renamed the "Youth Cinema Festival" and later the "International Youth Cinema Festival", hosting works by young artists across three categories: film, photography, and screenwriting.

With the festival’s increasing specialization in 2003, it adopted the title "Tehran International Short Film Festival", which it has retained ever since, exclusively focusing on short films from Iran and around the world. Since 2020, this festival has become the first and only short film festival in Iran where shorts can qualify for Academy Award consideration.

The 43rd Edition of TISFF will be held between 19 and 24 October 2026 in Tehran, Iran.

== Awards ==
Consisting of two different sections, the festival offers the following awards, each decided by a separate panel of juries:

=== National Competition ===
- Best Film - Previous winners include: Amir Shahab Razavian, Mehrdad Oskouei, Bahman Ghobadi, Mohsen Amiryoussefi, Shahram Alidi, Houman Seyyedi
- Special Jury Prize
- Audience Award
- Best Fiction Short
- Best Documentary Short
- Best Experimental Short
- Best Animated Short
- Best Original Screenplay
- Best Adapted Screenplay
- Best Cinematography
- Best Editing
- Best Artistic Achievement

=== International Competition ===
- Grand Prix - The winner becomes eligible for Academy Awards consideration. Previous winners include: Ashvin Kumar, Tomasz Bagiński, Constant Mentzas, Piotr Domalewski, Meryam Joobeur
- Best Fiction Short
- Best Documentary Short
- Best Experimental Short
- Best Animated Short
- Best AI Short
- Emerging Horizons Award

== Editions ==
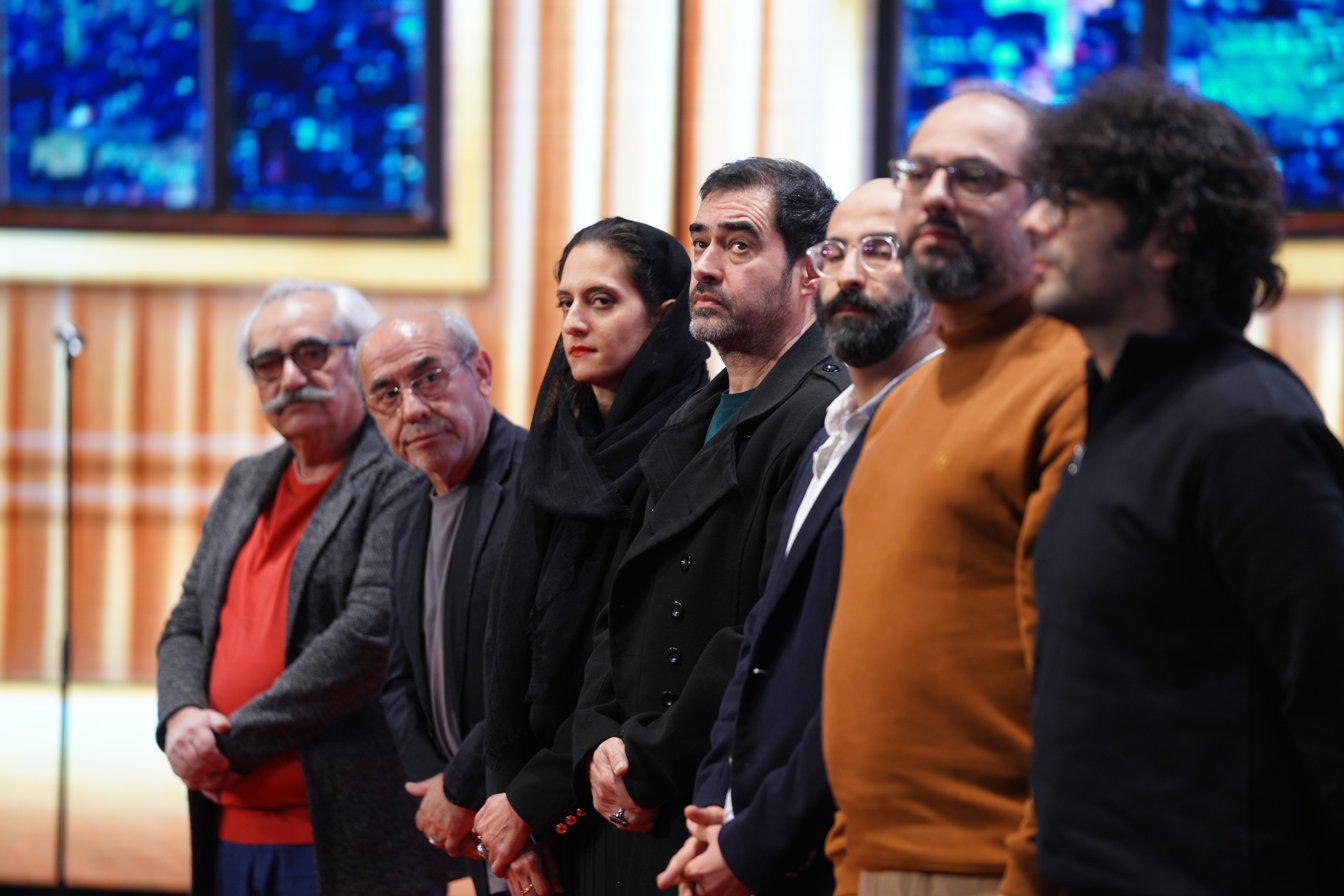
Members of the National Competition Jury at the 41st Tehran International Short Film Festival, from left to right: Farzad Motamen, Kamal Tabrizi, Dornaz Hajiha, Shahab Hosseini, Maysam Molaei, Mohammadreza Shafah & Arman Fayyaz

=== 1st Edition ===
Festival President	Juries	Event Date
Mohammadali Asna'Ashar	Morterza Pourazhari, Hojatollah Seifi, Hamid Dehghanpour, Majid Javanmard	1–11 February 1983

=== 2nd Edition ===
Festival President	Juries	Event Date
Mohammadali Asna'ashar	Mohammad Etesami, Seyfollah Daad, Hamid Dehghanpour, Mahmoud Nazaralian, Naser Abdollahinegar	1–11 February 1984
Award	Film Name	Recipient
Best Short Film	The Other	Amir Shahab Razavian

=== 3rd Edition ===
Festival President	Juries	Event Date
Saeed Hajimiri	Behrouz Afkhami, Kamal Tabrizi, Javad Salimi, Mohammad Afarideh, Mahmoud Arjmand	5–11 February 1985

=== 4th Edition ===
Festival President	Juries	Event Date
Saeed Hajimiri	Ebrahim Hatamikia, Kamal Tabrizi, Saeed Hajimiri, Mohammad Afarideh, Mahmoud Arjmand	27–31 March 1986

=== 5th Edition ===
Festival President	Juries	Event Date
Parviz Samadi Moghaddam	Ebrahim Hatamikia, Dariush Arjmand, Abolfazl Jalili	26–31 March 1987

=== 6th Edition ===
Festival President	Juries	Event Date
Parviz Samadi Moghaddam	Majid Gharizadeh, Farhod Saba, Karim Zargar, Mahdi Rahimian, Mohsen Sheikhi, Mahmood Arjmand	26–31 March 1988

=== 7th Edition ===
Festival President	Juries	Event Date
Parviz Samadi Moghaddam	Ebrahim Hatamikia, Abolfazl Jalili, Iraj Taghipour, Manouchehr Khoshmaram	28 March - 1 April 1989

=== 8th Edition ===
Festival President	Juries	Event Date
Parviz Samadi Moghaddam	Rakhshan Banietemad, Mahmoud Kalari, Ali Moallem, Ensieh Shah Hosseini, Behrouz Gharibpour, Mohammadali Hosseinnejhad	27–31 August 1990
Award	Film Name	Recipient
Best Short Film	In His History	Mehrdad Oskouei

=== 9th Edition ===
Festival President	Juries	Event Date
Vahid Toofani	Abolfazl Jalili, Mohammad Afarideh, Mahmoud Arjmand, Alireza Zohadi	9–13 September 1991

=== 10th Edition ===
Festival President	Juries	Event Date
Vahid Toofani	Nader Ebrahimi, Jahangir Almasi, Abdollah Bakide, Mohammadali talebi, Masoume Ansari	29 March - 1 April 1993

=== 11th Edition ===
Festival President	Juries	Event Date
Vahid Toofani	Houshang Moradi Kermani, Jahangir Almasi, Hamidreza Ashtianipour, Mohammad Sharifi, Ali Shidfar	28 March - 1 April 1994

=== 12th Edition ===
Festival President	Juries	Event Date
Vahid Toofani	Mahmoud Kalari, Hamidreza Ashtianipour, Esmail Rahimzadeh, Dariush Norouzi, Mohammadjafar Sadeghi, Aliakbar Ghazinezam	28 March - 1 April 1995

=== 13th Edition ===
Festival President	Juries	Event Date
Mohammad Hossein Sufi	Mahmoud Kalari, Hamidreza Ashtianipour, Aliakbar Ghazinezam, Naser Gholamrezai, Mohammadjafar Safi	18–23 July 1996

=== 14th Edition ===
Festival President	Juries	Event Date
Mohammad Hossein Sufi	Majid Majidi, Kamal Tabrizi, Jahangir Almasi, Javad Shamaqdari, Mohammad Kasebi	5–10 April 1997

=== 15th Edition ===
Festival President	Juries	Event Date
Mohammad Hossein Sufi	Nasser Taghvai, Kamal Tabrizi, Bahram Dehghani, Ahmad Alasti, Keyvan Jahanshahi, Gholam Heidari, Mohammad Davoodi, Mojtaba Raie, Ahmad Talebinejhad	13–17 April 1998

=== 16th Edition ===
Festival President	Juries	Event Date
Jafar Sanei Moghaddam	Majid Majidi, Kamal Tabrizi, Kiumars Pourahmad, Mahvash Sheikholeslami, Ali Mohammad Ghasemi, Mohammadali Talebi	29 September - 3 October 1999
Award (National Competition)	Film Name	Recipient
Best Film	Life in Fog	Bahman Ghobadi
Best Fiction Short	My Hometown, The Marsh	Mehrdad Oskouei
Award (International Competition)	Film Name	Recipient
Best Film	I Am But a Doll (Iran)	Parivash Nazarieh
Best Fiction Short	An Eternity (South Korea)	Kim Dae Hyun
Best Documentary Short	Internal 55 (Poland)	Estav Amirfabiki
Best Animated Short	Twin (Finland)	Milia Ahula

=== 17th Edition ===
Festival President	Juries	Event Date
Jafar Sanei Moghaddam	Nasser Taghvai, Kianoush Ayari, Reza Sobhani, Ahmad Alasti, Ahmad Zabeti Jahromi, Zaven Ghokasian, Zita Karvalhosa, Asako Fujioka	26 October - 1 November 2000
Award (National Competition)	Film Name	Recipient
Best Film	Cinema Dog	Shahed Ahmadloo
Award (International Competition)	Film Name	Recipient
Best Film	Yomut: a House, a Tribe (Iran)	Farshad Fadaian
Best Fiction Short	Charsho (Iran)	Mahvash Sheikholeslami
Best Documentary Short	Rojgiran (Iran)	Mehrdad Oskouei & Ebrahim Saeedi
Best Animated Short	Moon Man (Germany)	Chris Steiner & Arvid Weibel
Best Experimental Short	Musical Piece for Four Stairs and One Person (Germany)	Olaf Giur

=== 18th Edition ===
Festival President	Juries	Event Date
Jafar Sanei Moghaddam	Majid Majidi, Rakhshan Banietemad, Mohammad Reza Aslani, Reza Mirkarimi, Ali Moallem, Mario Vitalone, Constantine Pasallis	23–28 October 2001
Award (National Competition)	Film Name	Recipient
Best Film	If the Walls Could Talk	Nader Sheikholeslami
Award (International Competition)	Film Name	Recipient
Best Film	Naked of Evil (Greece) / Drooped in Water (Turkery) / Butterfly on the Shoulder (Iran)	Ari Bafalouka / Anwar Ardam / Parvin Donyafar
Best Fiction Short	Meska Sprawa (Poland)	Slawomir Fabicki
Best Documentary Short	Black House (Bangladesh )	Tariq Shahyar
Best Animated Short	Values (USA)	Van Phan
Best Experimental Short	Camouflage (England)	Jonathan Hudson

=== 19th Edition ===
Festival President	Juries	Event Date
Mojtaba Eghdami	Kambuzia Partovi, Alireza Shoja Nouri Jafar Sanei Moghaddam, Alireza Raisian, Mohammadreza Jafari Jelveh, Parviz Samadi Moghaddam	21–26 October 2002
Award (National Competition)	Film Name	Recipient
Best Film	Caravan	Mohsen Amiryoussefi
Award (International Competition)	Film Name	Recipient
Best Film	Two Women (Iran)	Amir Rezazadeh
Best Fiction Short	Leonard (Scottland)	Brian Kelly
Best Documentary Short	We Live at the Edge (Belarus)	Victor Alirus
Best Animated Short	Clown (Russia)	Irnia Onira
Best Experimental Short	17 Minutes (Poland & England)	Lala Rashij

=== 20th Edition ===
Festival President	Juries	Event Date
Mohammad Afarideh	Kamal Tabrizi, Mohammad Davoudi (screenwriter), Alireza Shoja Nouri, Reza Maghsoudi, Ahmad Alasti, Peter Vien, Erich Reyes, Sigo Tono, Silon Marit	20–25 October 2003
Award (National Competition)	Film Name	Recipient
Best Film	The last Uncounted Village	Shahram Alidi
Best Fiction Short	The Trouble of Being a Boy	Jamil Rostami
Best Documentary Short	The Window	Behzad Rasoulzadeh
Best Experimental Short	The Dragonfly Storm	Shahram Mokri
Award (International Competition)	Film Name	Recipient
Best Fiction Short	Ferdinand (Estonia)	Andrei Loop
Best Documentary Short	Red Rubber Boots (Bosnia)	Jasmila Žbanić
Best Animated Short	Hole (Iran)	Vahid Nasirian
Best Experimental Short	Mojgan (Korea)	Kim Hue Ho

=== 21st Edition ===
Festival President	Juries	Event Date
Mohammad Afarideh	Masoud Jafari Jozani, Soheila Najm, Manouchehr Tayab, Akbar Nabavi, Mojtaba Raei, Mohammadreza Sokoot, Mitzi Goldman, Andrey Kalpakchi, Christian Braad Thomsen	17–22 November 2004
Award (National Competition)	Film Name	Recipient
Best Film	I Speak to God	Kaveh Bahrami Moghaddam
Best Fiction Short	That	Poopak Mozafari
Best Documentary Short	The Wall	Arash Kordsali
Best Animated Short	Contrast	Vahid Nasirian
Best Experimental Short	The Dream of a Dragonfly	Mahdi Asadi
Award (International Competition)	Film Name	Recipient
Best Film	Little Terrorist (India)	Ashvin Kumar
Best Fiction Short	That (Iran)	Poopak Mozaffari
Best Documentary Short	Land of Mist (Denmark)	Suvi Andrea Helminen
Best Animated Short	Kerji (Germany)	Jan Touring
Best Experimental Short	Road	Martin Meija

=== 22nd Edition ===
Festival President	Juries	Event Date
Mojtaba Eghdami	Kianoush Ayari, Reza Mirkarimi, Hamid Khozouie Abyane, Bijan Mirbagheri, Habibollah Kasesaz, Mohammadmahdi Asgharpour, Michael Hannigan, Montserrat Givio Valez, Yuka Pekalakso	15–20 November 2005
Award (National Competition)	Film Name	Recipient
Best Film	The Case of Helias	Mohammad Ali Farsi
Best Fiction Short	My Boots	Safi Yazdanian
Best Documentary Short	Tis I, Darius	Vahid Bagherzadeh
Best Animated Short	The Screaming Room	Sheida Zarrinfam
Best Experimental Short	Anti-Memories	Kooroush Farzanegan
Award (International Competition)	Film Name	Recipient
Best Film	Fallen Art (Poland)	Tomasz Bagiński
Best Fiction Short	Role (Iran)	Farshid Azari
Best Documentary Short	Resident Permit (France)	Tatyana Soboleva
Best Animated Short	Room (South Koera)	Yu Seok Hyun
Best Experimental Short	A Man. A Road. A River. (Brazil)	Marcellvs L.

=== 23rd Edition ===
Festival President	Juries	Event Date
Nasser Bakideh	Mehrdad Oskouei, Mohammad Reza Aslani, Kambuzia Partovi, Akbar Alemi, Mojtaba Raei, Hassan Bolkhari, John Stanley Wachowski, Stavros Hassapis, Nicolas Gilberg, Lessad Jomoosi	21–26 November 2006
Award (National Competition)	Film Name	Recipient
Best Fiction Short	White Mountains	Taha Karimi
Best Documentary Short	Zero Degree Orbit	Mahmoud Rahmani
Best Animated Short	Mahboobeh	Ali Asghar rasooli
Best Experimental Short	Limit of A Circle	Shahram Mokri
Award (International Competition)	Film Name	Recipient
Best Film	Dillema (Netherlands)	Bormis Paul Kani
Best Fiction Short	Oxford Circus	Esteban Gitton
Best Documentary Short	As Is Their Wont (Belarus)	Galina Adamovich
Best Animated Short	Delivery (Germany)	Till Nowak
Best Experimental Short	Cross Tie (Brazil)	Joel Pizzini

=== 24th Edition ===
Festival President	Juries	Event Date
Nasser Bakideh	kamal Tabrizi, Maziar Miri, Amrit Gangar, Mohammadreza Sokoot, Misagh Amirfajr, Mani Mirsadeghi, Saeed Aghighi, Abdollah Alimorad, Andrzej Bednarek, Firas Dehni, Majid Shahhosseini	13–18 November 2007
Award (National Competition)	Film Name	Recipient
Best Fiction Short	The Cold Dream	Payman Nahan Ghodrati
Best Documentary Short	Cyanosis	Rokhsareh Ghaemmaghami
Best Animated Short	The Cage	Vahid Nassirian
Best Experimental Short	Alternation	Mehdi Fard Ghaderi
Award (International Competition)	Film Name	Recipient
Best Film	Ela (England)	Silvana Aguirre
Best Fiction Short	Datorie (Romania)	Vlad Trandafir
Best Animated Short	Ship (Poland) / Lost Doll (Iran)	Grigorij Yunkatis / Moin Samadi
Best Experimental Short	Boomerang (Iran)	Dariush Gharibzdeh

=== 25th Edition ===
Festival President	Juries	Event Date
Nasser Bakideh	Mohammad Ali Bashe Ahangar, Hamid Khozouie Abyane, Rasul Sadr Ameli, Abbas Arnaout Alireza Golpayegani, Majid Sheikh Ansari, Reza Serkanian, Morteza Razagh karimi, Azizollah Haji Mashhadi	13–18 November 2008
Award (National Competition)	Film Name	Recipient
Best Fiction Short	Blue tooth	Houman Seyyedi
Best Documentary Short	Square without a Fence	Mehrdad Zahedian
Best Animated Short	Solitude	Mehrdad Sheikhan
Best Experimental Short	Cold Blood	Amir Mehran
Award (International Competition)	Film Name	Recipient
Best Film	Gilles (Canada)	Constant Mentzas
Best Fiction Short	Le Crabe (Belgium)	Christophe Hermans, Xavier Seron
Best Documentary Short	Ageing Peter (Russia)	Ivan Golunov
Best Animated Short	Lisan al Gaib (England)	David Anderson (animator)
Best Experimental Short	Columba Palumbus (Spain))	Koldo Almandoz

=== 26th Edition ===
Festival President	Juries	Event Date
Nasser Bakideh	Mehrdad Oskouei, Mohammad Reza Aslani, Mohammadreza Arab, Abdollah Alimorad, Mahmoud Gabrloo, Ahmadreza Garshasbi, Mahnaz Mazaheri, Shahabeddin Adel, Abdollatif Ahmadi, Lassaad Jamoussi, Valerie Linardi	11-16 November 2009
Award (National Competition)	Film Name	Recipient
Best Fiction Short	All My Perosnal Effects Have Been Moved	Houman Seyyedi
Best Documentary Short	Morgh Sahar	Mehdi Bagheri
Best Animated Short	Twilight	Mohammadali Soleimanzadeh
Best Experimental Short	Minus	Kazem Mollaie
Award (International Competition)	Film Name	Recipient
Best Fiction Short	The Last Regal King Size (Scotland)	Simon Hipkins
Best Documentary Short	What's Your Name (Italy)	Georges Salameh
Best Animated Short	The Face (Hungary)	Frank Kako
Best Experimental Short	Minus (Iran)	Kazem Mollaie

=== 27th Edition ===
Festival President	Juries	Event Date
Hashem Mirzakhani	Pouran Derakhshandeh, Shahriar Bahrani, Danny Schechter, Alireza Amini, Mohammad Dormanesh, Ramtin Lavafipour, Hamid Soheili, Jalil Erfan Manesh, Bahram Azimi, Mohammad Reza Abbasian, Ahmad Atef, Wayne Coolsjean, Jorge Rodriguez, Hans-Joachim Schlegel	19-24 November 2010
Award (National Competition)	Film Name	Recipient
Best Fiction Short	Sokar	Dariush Gharibzadeh
Best Documentary Short	Mobile in Tehran	Loghman Khaledi
Best Animated Short	Over the Grey Clouds	Sare Shafiepour
Best Experimental Short	My House is Cloudy	Karim Azimi
Award (International Competition)	Film Name	Recipient
Best Fiction Short	A Drop (India) / Sokar (Iran)	Abhishek Pathak / Dariush Gharibzadeh
Best Documentary Short	The Gardner and His 21 Flowers (Denmark)	Emil Langballe
Best Animated Short	Speechless (England)	Daniel Greaves
Best Experimental Short	Especially Music (Iran) / Raw, Cooked, Burned (Iran)	Sina Ataeian Dena / Shahram Mokri

=== 28th Edition ===
Festival President	Juries	Event Date
Hashem Mirzakhani	Anis Lassoued, Nader Talebzadeh, Mohammad Davoudi (screenwriter), Yvonne Ridley, Azizollah Hamidnejhad, Seyed Abbas Pouya, Abbas Rafei, Mohammad Ali Farsi, Ahmad Kavari, Naghi Nemati, Jen Petersing, Julia Guest, Stavros Raptis, Hiroyuki Tanimoto	11–14 October 2011
Award (National Competition)	Film Name	Recipient
Best Fiction Short	Bitter Milk	Nasser Zamiri
Best Documentary Short	The Bread Cycle	Hossein Nazari
Best Animated Short	The Alchemist	Mehdi Khoramian
Best Experimental Short	Delete	Kazem Mollaie
Award (International Competition)	Film Name	Recipient
Best Fiction Short	Bitter Milk (Iran) / Barbakan (Poland)	Nasser Zamiri / Bartłomiej Żmuda
Best Documentary Short	El Nino Miguel (Spain)	Nacho Martin
Best Animated Short	I'm Going to Disneyland (France)	Calvin Antoine Blandin
Best Experimental Short	Planet Z (France)	Momoko Seto

=== 29th Edition ===
Festival President	Juries	Event Date
Hashem Mirzakhani	Rambod Javan, Yadollah Samadi, Reza Pourhossein, Bahram javanroudi, Morteza Shabani, Esfandiar Shahidi, Mohammadreza Gohari, Francisco Manuel Magalhaes Lobo Avila, Emilio Della Chiesa, Amir Emary, Ahmad Najafi, Mohammad Reza Eslamlou, Julian Polisse, Sourav Sarangi	1–7 October 2012
Award (National Competition)	Film Name	Recipient
Best Fiction Short	The Wind Will Yell Something	Ali Mardomi
Best Documentary Short	Shahrokh	Vahid Zarezadeh
Best Animated Short	Aperture	Amir Mehran
Best Experimental Short	C4	Behrouz Bagheri
Award (International Competition)	Film Name	Recipient
Best Fiction Short	The Last Hour (Jordan)	Roua Nazar
Best Documentary Short	Odysseus' Gambit (USA)	Alex Lora Cercos
Best Animated Short	Red Line (Iran)	Mona Abdollah Shahi
Best Experimental Short	We'll Become Oil (Romania)	Mihai Grecu

=== 30th Edition ===
Festival President	Juries	Event Date
Hashem Mirzakhani	Mehdi Karampour, Rasul Sadrameli, Ahmad Alasti, Mohammad Bozorgnia, Mohammad Reza Sokot, Mohammad Ali Safora, Ahmad Zabeti Jahromi, Mehdi Faraji, Seyyed Naser Hashemzade, Yeseri Bosaeed, Julia Guest, Jochen Ehmann, Paula Palacios, Young Chu-Young	14–20 October 2013
Award (National Competition)	Film Name	Recipient
Best Fiction Short	Jadeh Fari	Mohammad Nasiri
Best Documentary Short	Mookan	Mohammad Ali Hashemzehi
Best Animated Short	Why Doesn't This Phone Ring	Hadi Yaghinloo
Best Experimental Short	Somewhere to Live	Milad & Sajad Sotoodeh
Award (International Competition)	Film Name	Recipient
Best Fiction Short	¿Cómo te clasifico? (Uruguay)	Guy Dessent
Best Animated Short	Women's Letters (France)	Augusto Zanovello
Best Experimental Short	Mayfly (Iran)	Hossein Shayeghi

=== 31st Edition ===
Festival President	Juries	Event Date
Habib Allah Ilbeygi	Amir Shahab Razavian, Farhad Ghaemian, Reza Mirkarimi, Shahram Mokri, Loghman Khaledi, Fereshteh Taerpour, Narges Abyar, Jafar Sanei Moghaddam, Ravanbakhsh Sadeghi, Hooman Behmanesh, Masoud Amini Tirani, Christian Braad Thomsen, Johanna Bader, Claude Gizzard	14–19 October 2014
Award (National Competition)	Film Name	Recipient
Best Film	Cloudy Children	Reza Fahimi
Best Fiction Short	Cloudy Children	Reza Fahimi
Best Documentary Short	Alamto A Reptile Wonderland	Fathollah Amiri
Best Animated Short	Digital Native	Mahboobeh Mohammadzaki
Best Experimental Short	Breakable	Mehdi Aghajani
Award (International Competition)	Film Name	Recipient
Grand Prix	Digital Native (Iran) / Discipline (Switzerland)	Mahboobeh Mohammadzaki / Christophe Saber
Best Fiction Short	Au sol (France)	Alexis Michalik
Best Documentary Short	All The Winters Never Seen (Iran)	Mohammadreza Hafezi
Best Animated Short	Father (Argentina)	Santiago Grasso

=== 32nd Edition ===
Festival President	Juries	Event Date
Farid Farkhondehkish	Mostafa Aleahmad, Mohammad Ali Bashe Ahangar, Houman Seyyedi, Alireza Shoja Nouri, Saeed Tavakolian, farhad Tohidi, Azizollah Hamidnejhad, Mohammad Afaride, Seigo Tono, Matthias Flügge, Chang Yuk-mui	11–17 November 2015
Award (National Competition)	Film Name	Recipient
Best Film	Chelleh	Jamal Goli
Best Fiction Short	Chelleh	Davood Khayam
Best Documentary Short	Khunbazi	Mostafa Shiri
Best Animated Short	Empty Page	Siavash Khodaie
Best Experimental Short	Survival	Masoud Hatami
Award (International Competition)	Film Name	Recipient
Grand Prix	Koharubiyori (Japan)	Toshimichi Saito
Special Jury Prize	Survival	Masoud Hatami
Best Fiction Short	Everything Will Be Okay (Austria)	Patrick Vollrath
Best Documentary Short	Touch of Freedom (Poland)	Sardar Arshad Khan
Best Animated Short	The Shop of Songbirds (Ukraine)	Anatoliy Lavrenishyn

=== 33rd Edition ===
Festival President	Juries	Event Date
Farid Farkhondehkish	Mohammad-Reza Honarmand, Akbar Alemi, Mohsen Amiryoussefi, Reza Mirkarimi, Anna Henckel-Donnersmarck, Shubhra Gupta, Khosrow Sinai, Davood Khayam, Jukka-Pekka Laakso, Juliette Duret	4–8 November 2016
Award (National Competition)	Film Name	Recipient
Best Film	Common Hole / Tanavob	Asma Ebrahimzadegan / Ali Khoshdooni Farahani
Best Fiction Short	The Lost Items	Hamed Nejabat
Best Documentary Short	10,4.5 and 3.5	Mehdi Heidari
Best Animated Short	The Servant	Farnoosh Abedi
Best Experimental Short	999999999	Karim Azimi
Award (International Competition)	Film Name	Recipient
Grand Prix	Not Yet (Iran)	Arian Vazirdaftari
Best Fiction Short	Du Bout Des Doigts (Belgium)	Basile Vuillemin
Best Documentary Short	The Tibetan Girl (China)	Huaqing Jin
Best Animated Short	Joint-Tenants (France)	Delphine Priet-Maheo
Best Experimental Short	They Call Us the Enemy (Netherlands)	Pim Zwier

=== 34th Edition ===
Festival President	Juries	Event Date
Seyed Sadegh Mousavi	Majid Barzegar, Mehdi Jafari, Mehdi Karampour, Mahnaz Afzali, Amir Saharkhiz, Majid Sheikh Ansari, Jafar Sanei Moghaddam, Hamid Nematollah, Peter Murdmaa, Gipsy Yuk-mui Chang, Andrzej Bednarek, Abir Hashem	17–22 November 2017
Award (National Competition)	Film Name	Recipient
Best Film	Animal	Bahram & Bahman Ark
Audience Award	Animal	Bahram & Bahman Ark
Special Jury Prize	Marzieh / Marlon	Dornaz Hajiha
Best Fiction Short	Animal / Elephant's Shadow	Bahram & Bahman Ark / Arman Khansarian
Best Documentary Short	The Sacred Carpet	Mehdi Asadi
Best Animated Short	Icky	Parastoo Cardgar
Best Experimental Short	A Nightmare's Tale	Farhad Gholami
Award (International Competition)	Film Name	Recipient
Grand Prix	Evil Deeds (Poland)	Piotr Domalewski
Best Fiction Short	Andro (Georgia)	Tornike Gogrichiani
Best Documentary Short	The Sacred Carpet (Iran)	Mehdi Asadi
Best Animated Short	The Never-Ending Wall (Spain)	Silvia Carpizo
Best Experimental Short	Whole to the Part (Iran)	Seyed Vahid Hosseini Nami

=== 35th Edition ===
Festival President	Juries	Event Date
Seyed Sadegh Mousavi	Varuzh Karim Masihi, Ida Panahandeh, Behtash Sanaeeha, Loghman Khaledi, Virgil Widrich, Krzysztof Gierat, Mehrdad Oskouei, Mohammad Afaride, Kave Ghahreman, Ramtin Shahbazi, Thom Palmen, Sari Volanen, Per Fikse, Mick Hannigan	9–13 November 2018
Award (National Competition)	Film Name	Recipient
Best Film	In Between	Aliyar Rasti
Special Jury Prize	Dissect	Siavash Shahabi
Best Fiction Short	Reverence	Sogol Rezvani
Best Documentary Short	Joker	Sajad Imani
Best Animated Short	The Fox	Sadegh Javadi
Best Experimental Short	Not Being	Pooya Razi
Award (International Competition)	Film Name	Recipient
Grand Prix	Dissect (Iran)	Siavash Shahabi
Best Fiction Short	Fauve (Canada)	Jérémy Comte
Best Documentary Short	And What Is The Summer Saying (India)	Payal Kapadia (filmmaker)
Best Animated Short	Agouro (Portugal)	David Doutel and Vasco Sá
Best Experimental Short	Edge of Alchemy (USA)	Stacey Steers

=== 36th Edition ===
Festival President	Juries	Event Date
Seyed Sadegh Mousavi	Ebrahim Forouzesh, Nima Javidi, Shubhra Gupta, Hassan Zahedi, Mahmoud Arjmand, Mehrdad Zahedian, Maryam Kashkoolinia, Parivash Nazarieh, João Garção Borges, Gina Dellabarca, Ahmad Alasti, Turi Finocchiaro	9–15 November 2019
Award (National Competition)	Film Name	Recipient
Best Film	Aziz	Mahdi Barzoki
Special Jury Prize	Dabur	Saeed Nejati
Best Fiction Short	Aziz	Mahdi Barzoki
Best Documentary Short	Where The Wind Blows	Mina MashhadiMahdi
Best Animated Short	Tangle	Malihe Gholamzadeh
Best Experimental Short	Earth Style	Payam Rezai
Award (International Competition)	Film Name	Recipient
Grand Prix	Brotherhood (Canada)	Meryam Joobeur
Special Jury Prize	Ashmina (Nepal)	Dekel Berenson
Special Jury Prize	Each Other (Iran)	Sara Tabibzadeh
Best Fiction Short	Super Comfort (Finland)	Kirsikka Saari
Best Documentary Short	Histories of Wolves (Portugal)	Agnes Meng
Best Animated Short	Untravel (Serbia)	Nikola Majdak Jr.
Best Experimental Short	Places (Spain)	SClaudia Barral Magaz

=== 37th Edition ===
Festival President	Juries	Event Date
Seyed Sadegh Mousavi	Ashkan Rahgozar, Bahram Tavakoli (film director), Rouhollah Hejazi, Mohammad Reza Delpak, Behnam Behzadi, Esmaeel Monsef, Hamidreza Lotfian, Roqiye Tavakoli, Mohammad Mehdi Asgarpour, Naser Safarian, Kyeongyeon Kim, Lia Beltrami	20–25 January 2021
Award (National Competition)	Film Name	Recipient
Best Film	White Winged Horse	Hamidreza Zobeir
Best Fiction Short	White Winged Horse	Mahyar Mandegar
Best Documentary Short	Khoonyar Children	Arman Gholipour Dashtaki
Best Animated Short	Red Fire	Mona Abdollahshahi
Best Experimental Short	Adapt	Kamal Kachooian
Award (International Competition)	Film Name	Recipient
Grand Prix	White Clad (Iran)	Reza Fahimi
Best Fiction Short	Da Yie (Belgium/Ghana)	Anthony Nti
Best Documentary Short	Kaak Iraj (Iran)	Jamshid Farajvand Dana
Best Animated Short	Canada (Spain)	Marc Riba & Anna Solanas

=== 38th Edition ===
Festival President	Juries	Event Date
Seyed Sadegh Mousavi	Virgil Widrich, Abolfazl Jalili, Ensie Shah Hosseini, Manoochehr Shahsavari, Mohammad Taghi Fahim, Marjan Ashrafizadeh, Mehdi Khorramian, Reza Teymouri, Reza Fahimi, Lia Beltrami, Sebastien Simon, Shoko Takegassa	19–24 October 2021
Award (National Competition)	Film Name	Recipient
Best Film	Morse	Mohammad Yousefi & Amirhossein Enayati
Special Jury Prize	The Savior	Soheila Pourmohammadi
Best Fiction Short	Morse	Ronak jafari
Best Documentary Short	Chair	Mohammad Bagher Shahin
Best Animated Short	The Past	Hamid Mohammadi
Best Experimental Short	How Should One Wait For Godot	Arsiya Zeinali
Award (International Competition)	Film Name	Recipient
Grand Prix	Capsul (Iran)	Amir Pazirofteh
Best Fiction Short	Beyond Is The Day (Poland)	Damian Kocur
Best Documentary Short	I Won't Remain Alone (Iran)	Yaser Talebi
Best Animated Short	Step into the River (China/France)	Ma Weijia
Best Experimental Short	Identification (France)	Jean-François Commines

=== 39th Edition ===
Festival President	Juries	Event Date
Mehdi Azarpendar	Rasul Sadr Ameli, Mahmoud Kalari, Hossein Namazi, Hadi Moghaddamdoost, Rouhollah Sohrabi, Mohammadreza Sookot, Mirona Radu, Sergio Gomez, Tahsin Isbilen, Edvinas Puksta	19–24 October 2022
Award (National Competition)	Film Name	Recipient
Best Film	Andarva	Amir Pazirofteh
Special Jury Prize	Silkworm	Amir Honarmand
Best Fiction Short	Noshabeh Meshki	Mohammad Paydar
Best Documentary Short	I'm Back Alive	Mojtaba Heidari
Best Animated Short	The Sprayer	Farnoush Abedi
Best Experimental Short	Breakfast	Morteza Farhadnia
Award (International Competition)	Film Name	Recipient
Grand Prix	Outtakes (Spain)	Concha Barquero & Alejandro Alvarado
Best Fiction Short	Old Windows (England)	Paul Holbrook
Best Documentary Short	Heimat (Italy)	Giovanni Montagnana
Best Animated Short	Absence (France)	Marc Héricher
Best Experimental Short	Basin of Attraction (France)	Jonathan Pêpe

=== 40th Edition ===
Festival President	Juries	Event Date
Mehdi Azarpendar	Mahmoud Kalari, Giorgi Ovashvili, Mohammadhossein Latifi, Behrouz Shoaibi, Saeid Ghotbizadeh, Zohre Zamani, Hossein Darabi, Bahram Ark, Naghi Nemati, Georgios Zois, Marina Migunova, Wang Lina	19–24 October 2023
Award (National Competition)	Film Name	Recipient
Best Film	Nietzschean Suicide	Payam Kordestani & Bahman Rezai
Special Jury Prize	Recurrence	Ali Alizade
Audience Award	Ant	Farhad Shantiaei
Best Fiction Short	UFO	Hamid Hosseini, Mehdi Hosseini
Best Documentary Short	The Return	Fatemeh Marzbani
Best Animated Short	Being Ten	Fatemeh Jafari
Best Experimental Short		Mohammad Kachoei
Award (International Competition)	Film Name	Recipient
Grand Prix	Recurrence (Iran)	Ali Alizade
Best Fiction Short	Everything Depends on Mr.K (Iran)	Hassan Hekmat Ravesh
Best Documentary Short	Little Berlin (France)	Kate McMullen
Best Animated Short	Once War Is Over (Italy)	Simone Massi
Best Experimental Short	Now (China)	Ye Yuan

=== 41st Edition ===
Festival President	Juries	Event Date
Mehdi Azarpendar	Shahab Hosseini, Kamal Tabrizi, Farzad Motamen, A.R.Rahman, Sadia Khalid Reeti, Anthony Nti, Dornaz hajiha, Arman Fayyaz, Meysam Molaei, Mohammadreza Shafah, Masoud Madadi, Ahmadreza Motamedi, Maja Costa, Ekaterina Yakovleva	18–23 October 2024
Award (National Competition)	Film Name	Recipient
Best Film	Under the Shady Oak	Hossein Allahyari
Special Jury Prize	Limo Knew Everything	Edris Mahmoudian
Audience Award	Asin Show	Ali Tavakoli
Best Fiction Short	Claimant	Nadere Sadat Serki
Best Documentary Short	The Granny & Fishes	Maria Mavati & Ehsan Farokhi Fard
Best Animated Short	In the Shadow of the Cypress	Hossein Molayemi & Shirin Sohani
Best Experimental Short	Iliha	Reza Daneshpazhouh
Award (International Competition)	Film Name	Recipient
Grand Prix	A Short Film About Kids (Palestine)	Ibrahim Handal
Best Fiction Short	Crack of Dawn (Spain)	Anna Llargues
Best Documentary Short	The Granny & Fishes (Iran)	Maria Mavati & Ehsan Farokhi Fard
Best Animated Short	In the Shadow of the Cypress (Iran)	Hossein Molayemi & Shirin Sohani
Best Experimental Short	The Poem We Sang (Palestine)	Annie Sakkab
Best VR Short	Tadpole (USA)	Diane Catsburrow Linnet
Best AI Short	Miracle (Iran)	Afrouz Bavafa
The Truth Seekers Award	Incident (USA)	Bill Morrison

=== 42nd Edition ===
Festival President	Juries	Event Date
Behrooz Shoaibi	Mehdi Jafari, Damian Kocur, Marzieh Boroumand, Maryam Esmikhani, Ebrahim Saeedi, Bayram Fazli, Noushin Meraji, Hamid Nematollah, Parivash Nazarieh، Thom Palmen, Mirona Radu, Saeed Ebrahimifar, Joe Chang, Seifollah Samadian, Ahmad Alasti, Mahin Javaherian, Amir Saharkhiz, Tiyam Yabandeh, Nada Dagdoug	19–24 October 2025
Award (National Competition)	Film Name	Recipient
Best Film	And Life For All	Mohsen Asdaghpour
Special Jury Prize	Particle	Fardin Ansari
Audience Award	Bye Bye Garbage	Bahman & Bahram Ark
Best Fiction Short	Bye Bye Garbage	Bahman & Bahram Ark
Best Documentary Short	Robaro	Amir Pazirofteh
Best Animated Short	BMW 2002	Gholamreza Ghorbani
Best Experimental Short	Notes From The Underground	Abbas Shakoori, Sina Roosta
Award (International Competition)	Film Name	Recipient
Grand Prix	The Canon (Chile)	Martin Seeger
Best Fiction Short	Baozhda (China)	Keran Abukasimu
Best Documentary Short	My Name Is Oil (Azerbaijan)	Igor Smola
Best Animated Short	Winter in March (Armenia)	Natalia Mirzoyan
Best Experimental Short	A Visualization of a Cut (Denmark)	Claudia Munksgaard-Palmqvist
Best AI Short	The Valley (Argentina)	Juan Zabal
Emerging Horizons Award	The Whispering Rocks (Iran)	Ali Mohammad Tarahomi
