= Faramarz Ghahremanifar =

Iranian filmmaker and stereographer

- فرامرز قهرمانی‌فر
- Born: April 24, 1965; Tehran, Iran
- Died: 4 December 2016 (aged 51); Tehran, Iran
- Burial place: Tehran, Iran
- Occupations: Filmmaker; Stereographer; Photographer; Painter
- Years active: 1984–2016
- Known for: Pioneer of stereography and stereoscopy in Iran
- Spouse: Tayebeh Ebrahim (married 1999–2016)
- Children: Ava Ghahremanifar (Persian: آوا قهرمانی‌فر)
- Relatives: Naser Cheshmazar (maternal uncle); Manouchehr Cheshmazar (maternal uncle)

Signature
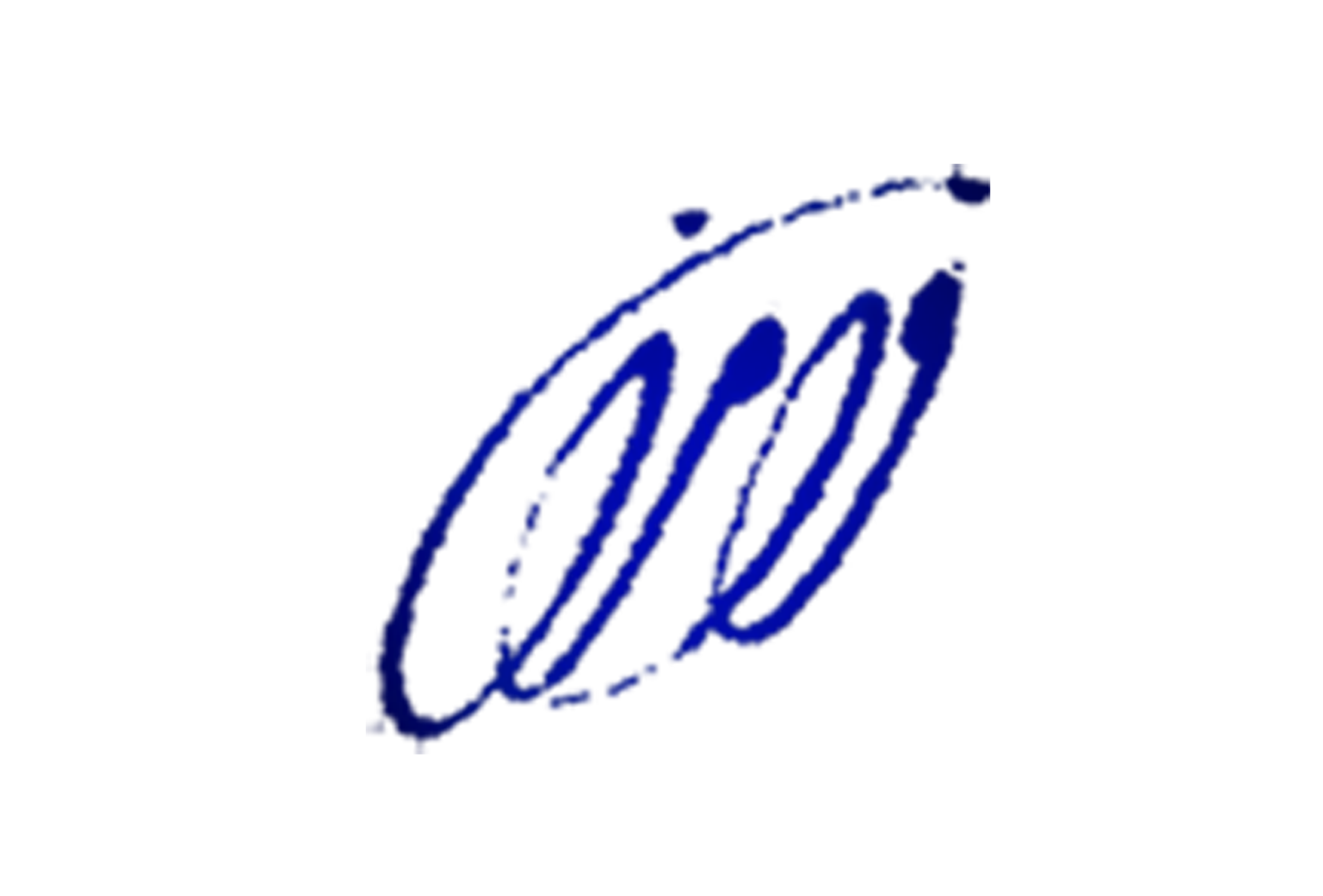

Faramarz Ghahremanifar (Persian: فرامرز قهرمانی‌فر; born on 24 April 1965 - 4 December 2016) was an Iranian filmmaker, stereographer, and inventor. He graduated in fine arts, graphic design, from Tehran's School of Fine Arts in 1984, and started out his professional career as a photographer.

== Personal life ==
Faramarz Ghahremanifar was born on 24 April 1965 in Tehran. He was the grandson of an Iranian musician, Esmaeel Cheshmazar. He made his first 3D film in 1997 and became the International Stereoscopic Union's (ISU) representative of Iran in 1998.

Faramarz Ghahremanifar married Tayebeh Ebrahim, an Iranian stage and television actress. They had a daughter, Ava Ghahremanifar, born in 2000, who is a visual artist, painter and filmmaker.

== Making the first 3D film in Iran ==
In 1997, he directed the first Iranian 3D film named "Runema" (translated as Visage). This film was produced by Iranian Youth Cinema Society (IYCS). "Runema" was made using the Pulfrich effect, which made it compatible with any type of display and television around the world. The audience of this film were able to watch the film in brilliant 3D without any disturbance in image and color with simple Pulfrich glasses. Meanwhile, without the glasses you would find it a normal 2D film.

In the following year, this film was released in Iran on VHS cassettes by Visual Media Institute. Also, the 3D glasses required were produced in a small studio managed by Faramarz Ghahremanifar, himself. The glasses were put inside the cassette package. The need for 3D glasses caused him to use his experience in print-making, graphic designing and painting, so he could initiate a line of 3D glasses production in Iran.

From 1998 to 2000, he made four new 3D documentaries in Pulfrich named Forest, Snow, Tehran's Grand Bazzar and Azadi Tower. These films were screened at 15th Tehran International Short Film Festival. As the final result of screening his previous 3D film, "Runema", in cinemas of Tehran, his films were purchased by Visual Media Institute.

In 2001, in a corporation between Faramarz Ghahremanifar and Behrouz Samad Motlagh, a new 3D documentary was filmed, "Third Dimension", which was screened at Roshd International Film Festival. Mohammadreza Sokout was the cinematographer.

== Patent ==
On 12 October 2011, stereo MRI system was patented by Faramarz Ghahremanifar and Samaneh Mohammadbagher.

== Books and professional articles ==
- Publishing an article in Stereoscopy magazine, June 1998
- Publishing an article on page 23 and 24 of Stereoscopy magazine, June 2001
- Publishing an international award-winning 3D photo on page 28 of Stereoscopy magazine, June 2004
- Publishing and introducing the 3D photos of Imam Reza shrine in Stereoscopy magazine, 2006
- Publishing 3D photos in a 400-page book "Fotografia 3D" by a Spanish publication, 2012
- Publishing two 3D photos on the front and back cover of in Stereoscopy magazine, 2015

== Awards ==
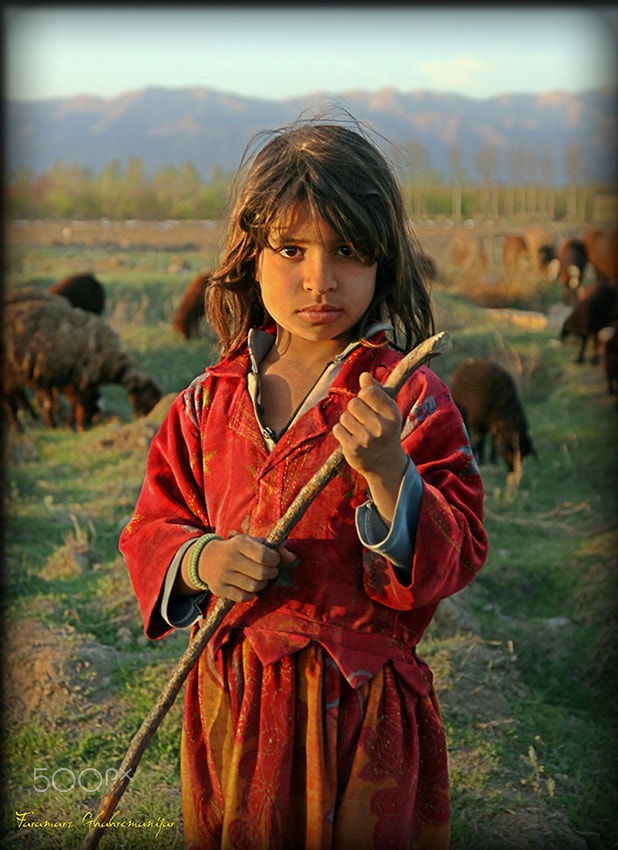
Afghan Girl In Iran

- Participated in the ISU International Exhibition and Competition - Germany - 1999
- Winner of the gold medal at the International Exhibition and Three-Dimensional International Photography Competition of the Stereoscopic Society of America (SSA) for "Still Life" - 2000
- Second place at the company's Digital International Exhibition and Competition (DDD) - 2001
- The New York Stereoscopic Associations (NSA) Digital Imaging Showcase on Nvidia - 2014
- Two medals at the 35th International 3D Photography Competition in Sydney, Australia - 2015
- Two Honorable Mentions at the 2015 Ohio International Stereo Exhibition for "Afghan Girl" and "Waiting for Children" - 2015
- PSA gold medal in the 56th Hollywood International 3D Photography Competition for "Freedom of Speech" - 2015
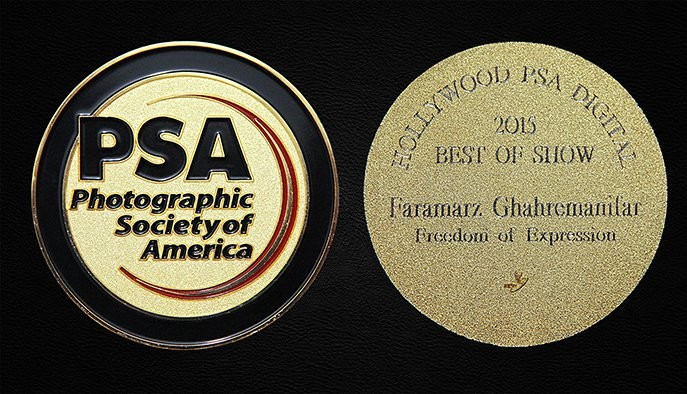
  Faramarz Ghahremanifar won Photographic Society of America (PSA) gold medal in 2015 for "Freedom of Speech"

== Illness and death ==
From an early age, Faramarz Ghahremanifar was struggling with a brain tumor, and this had caused him to have seizures. In 1987, doctors mistakenly diagnosed him with epilepsy and tried to treat him with Phenytoin. It was until 2006, when the doctors committee at Gamma Knife Center in Iran noticed a benign brain tumor in the right half of his brain. But, he refused to perform the operation due to the possibility of losing the ability to move his left hand and foot (paralysis). Then, six years later, the symptoms of the brain tumor recurred, forcing him to undergo surgery. By performing a closed brain operation, the tumor was burned by gamma rays and the blood supply to it was stopped. Despite the full return of power and physical strength after two years, the symptoms started to come back for the second time in 2015, and disturbed his art life and career.

At last, on September 4, 2016, Faramarz Ghahremanifar, went to the hospital, ready for the surgery. But, at midnight of the day doctors performed the surgery, because of an intense seizure, he fell into a coma. After three months, that is, on December 4, 2016, he died. Faramarz Ghahremanifar's body was buried at noon on Sunday, December 5, in Behesht Zahra Artists' Complex.
