= Moviemiento =

Short film festival

Moviemiento - short films on the road
- Logo of Moviemiento e.V.
- Location: Various
- Founded: 2003
- Website: http://www.moviemiento.org/

Moviemiento - short films on the road is a travelling short film festival originating in Berlin.

== Concept ==
Moviemiento is a short film festival without a permanent venue. Instead, cities and rural areas are visited along a given route. During the festival tour a documentary is produced and shown in the current program. Screenings are free of charge and generally take place in public space. Since 2008, in addition to film screenings, the festival organizes other activities like workshops, film competitions and panel discussions. Often a festival tour has a specific subject. In the 2008 tour Moving Baltic Sea it was environmental protection. Kinomobilny in 2009 had bilateral exchange between Germany and Poland as a topic.

== Festival tours and projects ==
Year	Title	Means of transportation	Stops
2003		Bus	Berlin (Germany), Amsterdam (Netherlands), Bern (Switzerland), Barcelona (Spain), Zagreb (Croatia)
2005		Bus	Berlin (Germany), Kraków (Poland), Budapest (Hungary), Aperta Festival (Croatia), Pietrasanta (Italy), Marseille (France), Barcelona (Spain)
2008	Moving Baltic Sea	Sailing ship	Rostock (Germany), Gdańsk (Polen), Kaliningrad (Russia), Riga (Latvia), Narva-Jõesuu (Estonia), Saint Petersburg (Russia)
2009	Kinomobilny	Bicycle	Several stops along the Oder–Neisse line
2010/2011	Cinecita	Bus	Ecuador, Peru, Bolivia
2011	Shoot and Run		Berlin (Germany)
2011	Le rêve roulant (Der rollende Traum)	Cinema trailer	Southern France
2012	temporary home 2012 - home in crisis		Kassel (Germany)
