= Dazed in Doon =

Dazed In Doon
- Poster
- Directed by: Ashvin Kumar
- Produced by: Dilip Shankar
- Cinematography: Sudheer Palsane
- Edited by: Ewa J Lind
- Music by: Rael Jones
- Production company: Alipur Films
- Distributed by: Alipur Films
- Release date: 2010
- Running time: 55 minutes
- Country: India
- Language: English

Dazed In Doon is a 2010 film written and directed by Ashvin Kumar, who was invited by The Doon School (Kumar's alma mater) to create a fictional film set in the school to mark its 75th Founder's Day in 2010. It has since become controversial as after the initial screening during the occasion, the school authorities moved to suppress the distribution of the film on the grounds that it "doesn't give the School a good name", referring to the scenes of bullying depicted in the film. The film runs to 55 minutes and was made in just four months, from the start of pre-production on 20 June 2010 to the first screening on 23 October 2010.

An international crew contributed to the making of the film and students of the school took on many roles in front of and behind the camera: acting, set design, sound, logistics, and more. Post-production was completed in Goa (editing), Italy (picture color correction) and London (sound mixing) with Kumar simultaneously completing post-production on Inshallah, Football. Most crew members worked for a fraction of their usual fees; Kumar persuaded them to participate in the making of film by highlighting the opportunity of teaching young children film-making in a participatory film project that would result in film of their own. Kumar sings the Doon School song 'Lab Pe Aati Hai' in the soundtrack as well as Howly is Krishna which was improvised during a music recording session in Goa.

== Plot ==
The film is a coming of age story about a boy nicknamed "Howly" (Sookrit Malik) with an active imagination who is trying to make sense of life at The Doon School, a prestigious public school in Dehra Dun in India.

Howly's friend, nicknamed "Boozy" (Aseem Kumar), is an excellent sportsman who is about to win the most coveted award for sports at Doon, the "games blazer". Seeing his friend's determination to win, Howly cheats on Boozy's behalf at a high jump qualifier, giving him the points Boozy needs to win the games blazer.

Despite Howly's loyalty and hero-worship of Boozy, Boozy refuses to associate with Howly in front of others, effectively relegating Howly to the role of a sidekick. After a particularly bad bullying episode that is witnessed by a School master, Howly is encouraged to audition for a part in the theatrical version of the Mahabharata. Howly discovers a natural talent for acting, and is cast in the lead role of the God Krishna.

Thereafter, the mythic world of the Mahabharata, with the philosophical and ethical choices forced upon its characters, merges with Howly's own real-life dilemmas; Boozy discovers that Howly had cheated on his behalf, and that his games blazer had been won unfairly.

Kumar attempted to demonstrate a number of positive qualities that he believed Doon instilled in its pupils: a sense of values, ethics, friendship, loyalty, the ability to correct moral choices, and to form independent judgments and decisions. The storyline of the film uses a classic text of ethics (the Mahabharata) to link the growing pains of a schoolboy with the subtleties of Dharma, as outlined in classical Indian philosophy, by linking these concepts to the ethical choices that the characters have to make in their day-to-day lives.

== Participatory educational project ==
Kumar and his crew spent several months on the campus making the film in a consultative and participatory process that included both teachers and students. The film was shot over 25 days, and included a cast and crew of 40 boys and more than 500 extras. As a consequence of dealing with these logistics, which included training a large number of young boys as actors and crew-members and dealing with a heavy monsoon that upset the shooting schedule, Kumar improvised some of the acting and settings of the film, yet keeping to the original story and script. It is perhaps the first time in India that a near feature-length film of this nature has been made with school boys taking key roles behind and in front of the camera.

== Censorship controversy ==
The present controversy between Kumar and the School authorities has the School complaining that the film does not conform with a version alleged to have been shown to the Headmaster before its presentation at the School, and Kumar asserting that the School should have asked for changes at the time the script was being drafted in close consultation with the School's representative, Ratna Pathak Shah, over a period of six months, since January 2010. The script had been submitted and approved, and funding was approved before shooting commenced.

As a consequence of this controversy, the School authorities have obtained an injunction from the district court in Dehradun to stop the film's release, and the dispute between director and School continues unabated.

The Headmaster of the Doon School asked the Ministry of Information and Broadcasting's censor board to withhold a censor certificate for the film on the grounds that the film is defamatory. The censor board upheld the Headmaster's concerns and awarded the film a U/A certificate, asking Kumar to produce a "no objection certificate" from the School.

Further complicating the dispute is the question of ownership of the film: the School asserts that it owns the film; Kumar asserts that the School is contracted to become one of three copyright holders, once the terms of the contract between Kumar and the School have been fulfilled. Kumar asserts, further, that since the School has not yet paid him in full under the terms of his contract, they cannot yet claim their one-third share of the copyright.

The dispute has polarized the alumni community of the School (known popularly as Doscos), with the more conservative alumni expressing concern about the School's reputation getting damaged as a result of the film depiction of bullying, etc. and the more liberal alumni expressing concern that the attempt to censor an artist's output is not in keeping with Doon's founding traditions or ethos.

The film was originally shown to about 3,000 people who attended Doon's 75th Anniversary celebrations in October 2010, while it received a standing ovation from some it also received an adverse reaction from a segment of the alumni community, which appears to have resulted in the School abruptly withdrawing the sale of the film's DVDs and banning any further screening or even discussion of the film among the students.
