= Aabha Hanjura =

Indian singer and songwriter

- Born: Aabha Hanjura; Srinagar, Jammu and Kashmir, India
- Occupations: Singer; songwriter; composer
- Years active: 2012–present
- Musical career
- Genres: Sufi; folk; pop
- Instruments: Vocals

Aabha Hanjura is an Indian singer, songwriter and composer who sings primarily in the Kashmiri and Hindi languages, as well as in Punjabi, Dogri and other languages. Hanjura is the lead vocalist of pop band Sufistication, which she founded in 2012. An indie artist, she is known for music that blends Kashmiri and other Indian folk and Sufi styles with contemporary pop music.

== Early life and education ==
Hanjura was born into a Kashmiri Pandit family in the Kanipora locality of Srinagar in the state of Jammu and Kashmir in India. When she was three, she and her family were displaced from the Kashmir Valley during the Hindu exodus due to insurgency in the state. She grew up in Jammu, which she recalls also being unstable due to the insurgency, but less so than the valley. She did her schooling in Jammu and received training in Hindustani classical music. In 2005, she and her family moved to Bengaluru in southern India. In Bengaluru, she took classes for western classical music. She graduated with a degree in commerce from Jain College.

== Musical career ==
Hanjura auditioned for the second season of television show Indian Idol when she was seventeen and was slated to appear on it as a contestant but says she did not because she believed the music industry was not a safe space for women at the time and instead wanted to continue her education. In 2012, Hanjura founded a pop band called Sufistication, a play on the words Sufi and sophistication. In 2013, she visited her former house in Kashmir in search of inspiration for her music. She quit her corporate job to focus on music full-time.

In June 2017, Hanjura released the single Hukus Bukus, combining several Kashmiri lullabies, poems and rhymes set to a chanson influenced composition with western and Kashmiri instruments. The song eventually went viral and became popular, and was used in a 2019 Indian film by Ashvin Kumar. It also featured in the first season of Indian television series The Family Man the same year. The song was also used in a video by INC politician Rahul Gandhi during the Kashmir section of his Bharat Jodo Yatra in 2023.

In 2019, she released two singles titled Dilbar Yuier Valo and Chalo Chinaro Ke Gharon, respectively in Kashmiri and Hindi. She released two singles in 2020, Nundbane, from a poem by poet Mahmud Gami, and Khoobsurat. In 2022, she began releasing tracks for an extended play (EP) called Sufistication Folk Sessions, featuring several folk songs in multiple north Indian languages, with Sahibo, a Kashmiri prayer by poet Mehjoor, and Punjabi folk song Kale Rang Da Paranda. She also released a ghazal influenced romantic single in August 2022. The last track of the EP, a Pahari folk song, was released in March 2023.

== Artistry ==
Aabha Hanjura is known for making music that combines Kashmiri and other Indian traditional and folk styles with contemporary pop music. She describes her music as "eclectic folk-pop." She lists Lalleshwari, Waris Shah, Bulleh Shah, Surinder Kaur, Nusrat Fateh Ali Khan, Reshma, Jagjit Singh and Junoon among influences. Her and her family's displacement from their homeland in the Kashmir valley, and a visit to her former house in the valley that she undertook as an adult, have shaped her artistry. She states that she wishes to popularise Kashmiri music, create a positive dialogue and build empathy towards Kashmiris—both Hindus and Muslims—through her music. Apart from her mother tongue Kashmiri, she has also sung in other north Indian languages such as Dogri, Punjabi, Hindi and Urdu.

== Personal life ==
Hanjura is married and has a daughter. She lives in Bengaluru.

== Filmography ==
=== Film ===
| Year | Title | Song | Notes |
|---|---|---|---|
| 2019 | No Fathers in Kashmir | "Hukus Bukus" | |

=== Television ===
| Year | Show | Song | Notes |
|---|---|---|---|
| 2019 | The Family Man | "Hukus Bukus" | |

== Discography ==
=== Singles ===
- "Hukus Bukus" (2017)
- "Khanmoej Koor" (2018)
- "Dilbar Yuier Valo: Roshewalla Part 1" (2019)
- "Chalo Chinaro Ke Gharon: Roshewalla Part 2" (2019)
- "Nundbane" (2020)
- "Khoobsurat" (2020)
- "Madano" (2022)

=== Albums and EPs ===
- "Sound of Kashmir"
- "Sufistication Folk Sessions" (2022–2023)
  - "Sahibo" (2022)
  - "Kale Rang Da Paranda" (2022)
  - "Punjabi Folk Boliyan" (2022)
  - "Kala Sha Kala" (2022)
  - "Banku Deya Chachua" (2023)
  - "Mere Hikduye Gadbad" (2023)
