= The Route (2024 film) =

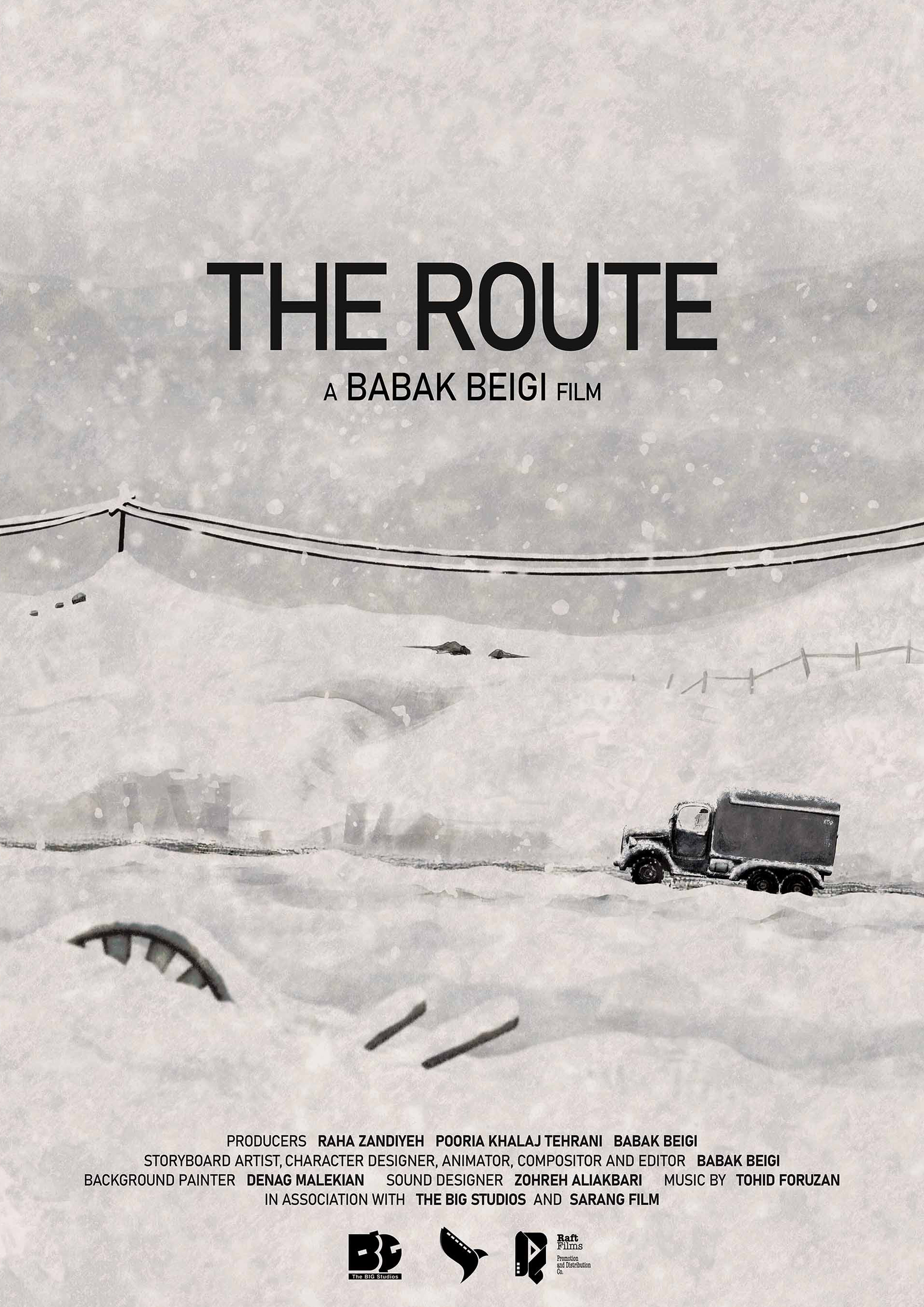
- Festival promotional poster
- Persian: راه
- Directed by: Babak Beigi
- Screenplay by: Babak Beigi
- Produced by: Babak Beigi
- Starring: (No dialogue)
- Cinematography: (Animated)
- Edited by: Babak Beigi
- Music by: Tohid Foruzan
- Production company: (Independent)
- Distributed by: Raft Films
- Release date: 3 June 2024 (Animafest Zagreb)
- Running time: 19 minutes
- Country: Iran
- Language: None (silent)

The Route (Persian: راه, Rah) is a 2024 Iranian animated short film written, directed, and produced by Babak Beigi. The 19-minute war drama follows a truck driver assigned to transport prisoners to execution sites in a bleak, unnamed landscape. Told entirely without dialogue, the film explores themes of guilt, complicity, and moral numbness in the face of wartime violence.

The film was independently produced in Iran using 2D computer animation, with Beigi also serving as editor, character designer, and colorist. It premiered in the Grand Competition for short films at the Animafest Zagreb in June 2024, and was later screened at the Seoul Indie-AniFest in South Korea, the Tehran International Short Film Festival, the Tokyo Anime Award Festival (as one of 26 international finalists), and the IMAXINARIA Festival Internacional de Animación Afundación in Spain.

In 2025, the film received a Special Distinction of the Jury at the Insomnia International Animation Film Festival in Russia. It was also screened at the Iranian Film Festival New York, where it was praised for its painterly visual style and minimalist storytelling.

== Plot ==
Set in a desolate, war-torn landscape, The Route follows a solitary truck driver whose daily duty is to transport prisoners to remote execution sites. To endure his grim routine, he drowns out the sounds of gunfire and screams by blasting loud music in his cabin. His face remains expressionless as he drives through vast stretches of empty desert and snow-covered plains, delivering groups of prisoners to soldiers waiting at the destination.

Over time, the driver develops a coping mechanism of detachment — convincing himself that what happens beyond his truck is not his concern. One night, however, a malfunction in the vehicle forces him to stop near one of the execution grounds. As he steps out, the silence and the sight of lifeless bodies break through his numbness. Confronted with the horror he has helped sustain, he faces a moral reckoning that shatters his emotional distance.

The story unfolds without dialogue, relying entirely on visual storytelling, sound design, and atmosphere to depict the driver's internal struggle. Festival curators described the film as “a portrayal of unpleasant relief and sudden awakening, where death becomes a mirror reflecting one’s own denial.”

== Themes ==
Critics and festival curators have noted that The Route functions as a psychological study of moral detachment under systems of violence. The driver's indifference and routine obedience have been compared to what political theorist Hannah Arendt described as the “banality of evil” — the normalization of cruelty through bureaucratic duty rather than overt hatred.

Through its minimalist storytelling and lack of dialogue, the film suggests that moral blindness can arise not only from ideology but also from habit and emotional fatigue. As one festival note observed, The Route “portrays a man who convinces himself he is uninvolved — until the truth stands before him.”

== Production ==
The Route was independently produced in Iran between 2023 and 2024. Babak Beigi handled nearly all major creative roles, including writing, directing, editing, character design, color grading, and compositing. The film was created using 2D computer animation, combining hand-drawn digital artwork and composited textures to achieve a painterly, semi-realistic aesthetic.

Beigi cited both cinematic and fine art influences for the visual style and narrative tone. In an interview with Zippy Frames, he mentioned that The Route was inspired by the emotional intensity of war films such as Son of Saul (2015), Cold War (2018), and 1917 (2019), as well as paintings like Francisco Goya's The Third of May 1808 and Pieter Bruegel's Hunters in the Snow.

The production team was small, consisting mainly of three collaborators: Denag Malekian (background painting), Zohreh Aliakbari (sound design), and Tohid Foruzan (original score). The film's soundscape was designed to replace dialogue with environmental noise and mechanical rhythm — particularly the sound of the truck engine and the driver's radio music — as metaphors for denial and psychological defense.

Beigi described the project as “a journey to a placeless world where conscience becomes the only remaining weapon,” emphasizing his intent to make an anti-war film that transcends cultural and temporal boundaries.

== Release and festival screenings ==
The Route had its world premiere in June 2024 at the Animafest Zagreb in Croatia, where it competed in the Grand Competition for short films. The selection was noted by festival programmers for the film's distinctive visual tone and its “powerful portrayal of moral blindness in wartime routine.”

Following its premiere, the film was screened at several major international animation festivals:

Seoul Indie-AniFest (South Korea, 2024) – competed in the “Asia Road” section, where curators praised its timeless anti-war message and haunting atmosphere.

Tehran International Short Film Festival (Iran, 2024) – screened in the international competition, marking its domestic festival debut.

Tokyo Anime Award Festival (Japan, 2025) – selected as one of the 26 finalists in the short animation category, out of nearly one thousand international entries.

IMAXINARIA Festival Internacional de Animación Afundación (Spain, 2025) – included in the +16 competition program.

Iranian Film Festival New York (United States, 2025) – screened as part of the festival's selection of contemporary Iranian short films.

In September 2025, The Route received the Special Distinction of the Jury at the Insomnia International Animation Film Festival in Russia, recognizing its direction and visual design.

The film continued to appear in curated animation showcases through late 2025 and was distributed internationally by Raft Films, a Paris-based company specializing in independent Middle Eastern cinema.

== Reception ==
The Route received positive responses from festival programmers and animation critics for its visual design, soundscape, and restrained storytelling. Writing for Zippy Frames, animation journalist Vassilis Kroustallis described the film as “a haunting and painterly anti-war allegory” that visualizes “moral paralysis in the face of violence.”

At the Seoul Indie-AniFest in South Korea, festival curators highlighted the film's atmosphere of desolation and psychological depth, noting that “it transcends modern times to reach both the past and the future” in its depiction of guilt and denial.

In its coverage of the 2024 Animafest Zagreb, Animation Magazine included The Route among the standout world premieres, describing it as “a stark portrayal of a truck driver who tries to drown out the sound of executions with loud music — a chilling metaphor for collective denial.”

In September 2025, the film won the Special Distinction of the Jury at the Insomnia International Animation Film Festival in Russia, where jurors praised its direction and art design for conveying “empathy through silence.”

Overall, critics have interpreted The Route as a meditation on complicity and moral blindness in wartime, often drawing parallels to Hannah Arendt’s concept of the “banality of evil”.

== Awards and nominations ==
Festival / Award	Date of ceremony	Category / Section	Recipient(s)	Result
Animafest Zagreb	June 2024	Grand Competition – Short Films	Babak Beigi	Nominated
Seoul Independent Animation Festival	September 2024	Asia Road Competition	Babak Beigi	Nominated
Tehran International Short Film Festival	October 2024	International Competition – Animation	Babak Beigi	Nominated
Tokyo Anime Award Festival	March 2025	Best Short Animation	Babak Beigi	Nominated
IMAXINARIA Festival Internacional de Animación Afundación	May 2025	Official Competition (+16)	Babak Beigi	Nominated
Insomnia International Animation Film Festival	September 2025	Special Distinction of the Jury	Babak Beigi	Won
Animafest Cyprus – Views of the World	October 2025	International Short Film Competition	Babak Beigi	Nominated

== See also ==
- Hannah Arendt
- Banality of evil
