= Hossein Molayemi =

Iranian animation director and designer (born 1982)

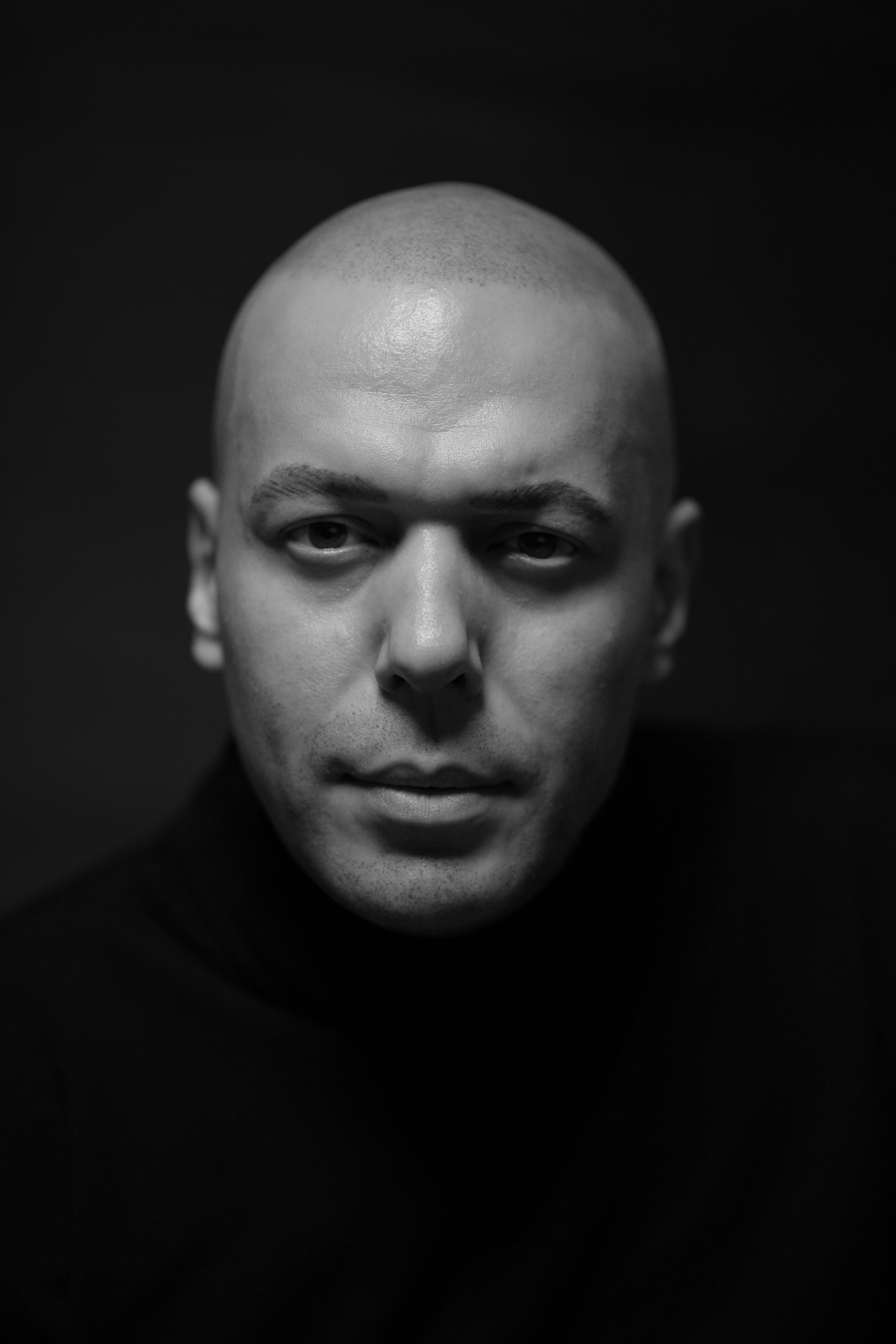
- Hossein Molayemi in 2024
- Born: Hossein Molayemi; 23 August 1982 (age 43); Shiraz, Iran
- Education: Bachelor's in Graphics from Soore University; Master's in Animation from the University of Art, Tehran
- Occupations: Animation director Professor at the University of Tehran
- Known for: Winner of the 2025 Academy Award for Best Animated Short Film
- Notable work: In the Shadow of the Cypress
- Spouse: Shirin Sohani

Hossein Molayemi (born 23 August 1982) is an Iranian animation director and designer.

In 2025, the short animated film In the Shadow of the Cypress, which he co-directed with his wife, Shirin Sohani, won the Academy Award for Best Animated Short Film at the 97th Academy Awards. The win marked Iran's first Academy Award in the animated film categories.

== Early life and education ==
Molayemi was born in Shiraz, Iran in 1982. He graduated from the Boys' Fine Arts High School of Karaj in 2000 with a diploma in painting. He later earned a bachelor's degree in graphics from Soore University in 2006 and a master's degree in animation from the University of Art in 2010.

== Career ==
From 2003 to 2005, Molayemi worked in 2D animation production at Ghelghelak Studio, where he contributed to videos for the 20th Isfahan International Festival of Films for Children and Youth. In 2006, he became international section editor and translator for the quarterly arts publication Khat-Khati.

In 2007, Molayemi worked as a costume, weapon, and accessory designer for Peace Force, an animated feature film directed by Borzou Rafeipour. That year, he also founded and became the first secretary of the Scientific Association of Animation at the University of Art.

In 2009, he co-founded Barfi Studio. In 2014, Molayemi and his wife, Shirin Sohani, co-founded Barfak Studio, an animation production company based in Iran.

== Honors and awards ==
Year	Film	Festival	Category	Result	Ref.
2024–2025	In the Shadow of the Cypress	97th Academy Awards	Best Animated Short Film	Winner	
2024–2025	In the Shadow of the Cypress	41st Tehran International Short Film Festival	Best Animated Film (National Competition)	Winner	
2024–2025	In the Shadow of the Cypress	Tribeca Film Festival	Best Animated Short	Winner	
2024–2025	In the Shadow of the Cypress	Animayo International Film Festival	Grand Jury Prize for Best International Film	Winner	
2024–2025	In the Shadow of the Cypress	13th Tehran International Animation Festival	Best Animation, Best Character Design, Best Animators, and International Honorary Diploma	Winner	
2024–2025	In the Shadow of the Cypress	28th LA Shorts International Film Festival	Best Animation	Winner	
2024–2025	In the Shadow of the Cypress	47th Drama International Short Film Festival	Best Animation	Winner	
2024–2025	In the Shadow of the Cypress	Annecy International Animated Film Festival	Crystal Award for Best Short Film	Nominated	
2024–2025	In the Shadow of the Cypress	52nd Annie Awards	Annie Award for Best Animated Short Subject	Nominated	
2024–2025	In the Shadow of the Cypress	Melbourne International Film Festival	City of Melbourne Award	Nominated	
2024–2025	In the Shadow of the Cypress	Clermont-Ferrand International Short Film Festival	Canal+ Award	Nominated	
2024–2025	In the Shadow of the Cypress	80th Venice Film Festival	Horizons Award for Best Short Film	Nominated	
	Run Rostam Run	20th Iran Cinema Celebration	Honorary Diploma for Best Animation	Winner	
	Run Rostam Run	Isfahan International Festival of Films for Children and Youth	Best International Animation	Winner	
	Run Rostam Run	10th Tehran International Animation Biennial	Golden Statue for Best Animator	Winner	
	Run Rostam Run	6th International Urban Film Festival	Best Director	Winner	
	Run Rostam Run	6th International Urban Film Festival	Best Animated Film	Nominated	
	Run Rostam Run	6th International Urban Film Festival	Best Animator	Nominated	
	Run Rostam Run	10th Iran Animation Celebration	Best Director	Winner	
	Run Rostam Run	10th Iran Animation Celebration	Best Film	Nominated	
	Run Rostam Run	35th Tehran International Short Film Festival	Best Animated Film (Audience Choice)	Winner	

== Filmography ==
- In the Shadow of the Cypress (2023): Director, Producer, Character Designer, Layout Artist, Background Designer
- Run Rostam Run (2016)
- The Little Beetle: Director, Character Designer, Storyboard Artist
- Commando: Character Designer, Background Artist, Layout Artist
- Red Line: Character Designer, Storyboard Artist, Lead Animator, Editor
- The Neighbors (TV series): Art Director, Character Designer
- The Champions (TV series): Director, Character Designer
- The Fan (2014): Editor; directed by Shirin Sohani
