= Ashvin Kumar =

Indian film director

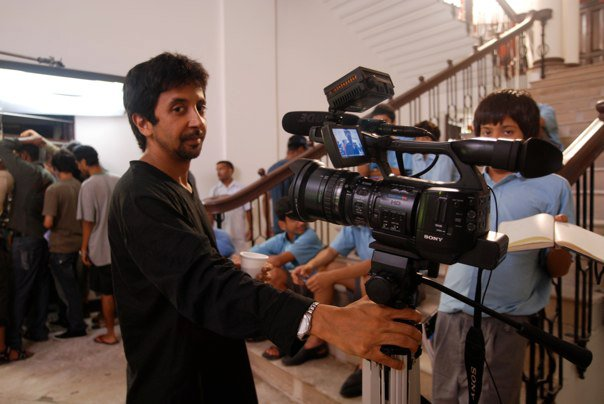
- Ashvin Kumar filming Dazed in Doon at The Doon School (2010)
- Born: Ashvin Kumar; Kolkata, India
- Education: Delhi University
- Mother: Ritu Kumar
- Website: ashvinkumar.com

Ashvin Kumar is an Indian filmmaker. He wrote, directed and produced India's only Oscar-nominated short film, Little Terrorist (2004), with his debut film Road to Ladakh being released in the same year. He also made the feature-length documentary films Inshallah, Kashmir (2012) and Inshallah Football (2010); feature-length thriller The Forest (2012); and coming-of-age tale Dazed in Doon (2010).

In 2005, Kumar became the youngest Indian writer/director to earn an Academy Award Oscar nomination. He is also the first Indian to be nominated at the European Film Academy with his film Little Terrorist.

== Early life and education ==
Ashvin Kumar was born in Kolkata, India. He is fashion designer Ritu Kumar's son.

He did his schooling at La Martiniere Kolkata, Modern School, and The Doon School, Dehradun. He went on to study at St. Stephen's College, New Delhi, where he was an active member of the Shakespeare Society, and then at Goldsmith College in London, where he received a bachelor's degree in media and communication. He also studied briefly at the London Film School.

== Films ==
=== Road to Ladakh ===
Kumar's first feature film was Road to Ladakh, which took nine months to make, although the actual filming was done in 16 days. The film is 48 minutes long, and was released in 2004. Kumar has described this film as his "film school", referring to him dropping out of the London Film School and investing the course fees into the making of this film. Kumar learnt production and post production by immersing himself into various roles and learning the craft on-the-fly while putting his own film through the many stages of production. He describes it as a process of trial and error from which he emerged with a completed film. For starters, "Road to Ladakh was a disaster of a film shoot, we were lucky to get the film done" "Out of a ten-day shoot, it was raining on five days. So, we had to finish the shoot in half the time. There was just one petrol pump (in Spiti valley where the film was shot) – we had seven cars and two trucks and a cast and crew of 40 people (who were staying in camping tents that later got flooded) looking at me for directions at every step. There I was – my first film, in Ladakh, and I thought to myself – what the hell have I got myself into?" The experiences of this shoot are captured in the making-of documentary The Near Un-making of Road To Ladakh which accompanies the film on a DVD released for the first time in India in 2009 through Junglee Video (the DVD label of Times Music) in a double bill with Little Terrorist. The DVD also contains a making-of documentary of Little Terrorist.

Starring Irrfan Khan and Koel Purie (of Everybody Says I'm Fine!), Road to Ladakh follows the surreal rites of passage encounter between a dysfunctional, coke-snorting fashion model and an ultra-focussed, strong-silent stranger who are thrown together by chance. Road To Ladakh was set near the borders of India and Pakistan, and employed a multi-national European crew. It hit several obstacles in the Himalayas and was nearly not completed, as documented in The Near Un-making of Road To Ladakh.

=== Little Terrorist ===
His second film, a short film title Little Terrorist (2005), was substantially more successful, winning an Academy Award nomination and a nomination for the European Film Awards, as well top prizes at the Tehran International Short Film Festival, Flanders International Film Festival, Montreal World Film Festival, Manhattan International Short Film Festival, and the São Paulo International Short Film Festival. The film was to over 120 film festivals around the world. This film was shot in the tight budget in the deserts of Rajasthan.

The film was based upon a real-life incident in the year 2000, where a young goatherd crossed the Indian-Pakistan border and was subsequently imprisoned by the Indian police. Atal Bihari Vajpayee, Prime Minister of India, freed the boy as a peace gesture intended to improve Indian-Pakistan relations.

In the film, a 12-year-old Pakistani boy named Jamal mistakenly crosses the border into Indian territory while attempting to retrieve a cricket ball. While Indian soldiers search the village for the Pakistani "terrorist", the boy is given shelter by an elderly Brahmin schoolteacher named Bhola, despite the latter's deep-rooted prejudice against Muslims, and the objections of Bhola's niece, Rani .

The story is set near the Gujarat border between India and Pakistan, but the film was made in five days in a village outside Jaipur in Rajasthan. Kumar's mother, the fashion designer Ritu Kumar, designed the clothes for the actors.

The film is a "live action short", just 15 minutes in length. It has been described as the first short film to get a commercial release in India.

The film was crewed through the Shooting People organisation; members who liked the script paid their own fares to travel to India to film it. Kumar became the only Indian to be nominated for an Oscar in the short film category.

=== The Forest ===
The Forest was loosely based upon the writings and exploits of Jim Corbett and uses the tale of a man-eating leopard to address environmental concerns. The film is feature-length (86 minutes), and was released in theatres in India on 11 May 2012.

The plot concerns a married couple who arrive at a wildlife sanctuary in the Kumaon Hills to attempt to mend a faltering marriage. An unforeseen threat takes the form of an ex-lover turned wildlife warden. While the husband and lover quarrel, a man-eating leopard is on the prowl, and both men must unite in order to outwit the predator and survive the night.

While The Forest is a conventional action film, Kumar intended the film to convey a strong pro-environmental message.

The film was produced by Judith James and the music recorded at the Abbey Road Studios. Much of the filming was done at the Corbett National Park and the Bandhavgarh National Park. The film stars Jaaved Jaaferi, Nandana Sen and Ankur Vikal. The forest wildlife sequences were filmed by rbrothers Naresh and Rajesh Bedi. Additional cinematographer and sound were done by Naresh's twin sons Vijay and Ajay Bedi.

=== Dazed in Doon ===
Kumar, himself a former student of The Doon School, was invited by them to create a film, subsequently named Dazed in Doon. The film runs to 55 minutes and was made in just four months, from the start of pre-production on 20 June 2010 to the first screening on 23 October 2010.

An international crew contributed to the making of the film: post-production was completed in Goa, Italy, and London, with Kumar simultaneously completing post-production on Inshallah, Football. Most crew members worked for a fraction of their usual fees: Kumar persuaded them to participate in the making of film by highlighting the opportunity of teaching young children film-making in a participatory film project that would result in film of their own. Kumar sings the Doon School song "Lap Pe Aati Hai" in the soundtrack as well as Howly is Krishna which was improvised during a music recording session in Goa.

Imaginox, an online film school, were the sponsors of the video Making of Dazed in Doon. Two British film makers were sent by Imaginox from the UK to join Kumar's crew on The Doon School campus where they, simultaneously with Kumar's filming, shot a behind-the-scenes documentary film.

The film is a coming-of-age story about a boy nicknamed "Howly"(Sookrit Malik) with an active imagination who is trying to make sense of life at The Doon School, a prestigious public school located in Dehra Dun in India.

Kumar and his crew spent several months on the campus making the film in a consultative and participatory process that included both teachers and students. The film was shot over 25 days, and included a cast and crew of 40 boys and more than 500 extras. As a consequence of dealing with these logistics, which included training a large number of young boys as actors and crew-members and dealing with a heavy monsoon that upset the shooting schedule, Kumar improvised some of the acting and settings of the film.

=== Inshallah, football ===
Kumar's first documentary film, the National Award winner Inshallah, football, is a feature documentary about an aspiring footballer who was denied the right to travel abroad on the pretext that father was a militant in the 1990s. The film was completed in 2010, and faced difficulties getting released in India. The film's first screening in India at the India Habitat Center received this review from Tehelka magazine: "Kumar's camera catches the irony of Kashmir's physical beauty, the claustrophobia of militarisation, the dread and hopelessness of children born into war and the nuances of relationships. It also filters the inherent joie-de-vivre of youth, even if that flows uneasily with Kashmir's collective memory of unmitigated grief... There is no better way to understand Kashmir right now". The film was shot by Kumar himself using five different camera formats.

Inshallah, Football is about 18-year-old Basharat Baba, known as "Basha". His father, Bashir, was a much-wanted leader of the armed group Hizbul Mujahideen. When he left his home in Kashmir to join the training camps in Pakistan in the early 1990s, his son Basharat was barely two months old.

Basharat belongs to a new generation of Kashmiris, having grown up under the shadow of a protracted conflict. His passion is football, and he has been coached by Juan Marcos Troia, an Argentinean national and FIFA accredited football coach by profession. Marcos aspires to breed world class players from Kashmir; he and his wife, being attached to both Basha and Kashmir, migrate to Srinagar with their three daughters to take up Basha's cause.

Marcos runs a football academy called International Sports Academy Trust; and an exchange program for his most talented players to train at Santos FC, Pele's old club in Brazil. Basharat was one of chosen few, but was denied a passport by the Government of India. The passport in question did come through after Jammu and Kashmir Chief Minister Omar Abdullah intervened.

Inshallah, Football tells this story through Bashir's recollections and travails. Kumar describes the film as "the story of three remarkable men – one is his father who fought for his beliefs, another about the football coach who's come all the way from Argentina to start this football academy, and this young man who is struggling to play football."

The film has been critically acclaimed and played in competition part of the wide-angle documentary section at the Pusan Film Festival where it also received the Asian Network of Documentary (AND) Fund, and winner of Muhr AsiaAfrica / Documentary /Special Mention : Ashvin Kumar (director) at the Dubai International Film Festival

=== Inshallah Kashmir ===
Kumar's 2012 film on Kashmir, Inshallah Kashmir, is the story of contemporary Kashmir. A series of counterpointed testimonies, the heartbreaking coming-of-age of ordinary people; warped and brutalised by two decades of militancy and its terrible response. Tehelka says, "Although the camera and narrator usually provide the impartial eye in a documentary, stitching the story together, in Inshallah, Kashmir it is the Kashmiris who weave their deadpan narrative into a cohesive picture. Their matter-of-fact monotone says more than an entire valley of screams could." The film won Kumar his second National Award, this time for Best Investigative Film.

Inshallah Kashmir opens with ex-militants describing the torture they underwent when captured by the army. A Hindu describes his sentiment on being a part of the minority in the region at the height of militancy, when his grandfather was shot dead by militants. A politician and her husband describe the horror of being kidnapped and in captivity for over a month – and despite that, forming a human bond with the militants, and helping them escape when the army closed in on them. One understands from this section that militancy was not binary in nature. It was a dynamic and complex, resulting from various socio-political, economic and religious issues.

Disappearances and fake encounters led to the creation of mass graves, hidden away in sensitive border areas that civilians and journalists are not permitted to access in the name of national security. Human rights lawyer and activist Parvez Imroz reveals to us the presence of almost a thousand such graves in the valley. Rape victims from Kunan Poshpora describe the trauma they went through at the hands of the army and the stigma that they still face due to the incident.

The film then leads us to 'normalcy' or the social ramifications the last twenty years of devastation brought to the valley. Militancy in Kashmir resulted in the Government of India deploying tens of thousands of armed troops in the region. We hear the story of one boy who lost his leg because he was caught in crossfire. The film ends on a poignant note with a young artist saying 'I need my space.'

On 18 January, Alipur Films uploaded the first seven minutes of the film Inshallah Kashmir : Living Terror online. Social networking sites like Facebook and Twitter picked it up and the link had over a ten thousand hits in a week and generated curiosity and contempt alike. Views had crossed over fifty thousand within a week.

The idea of releasing Inshallah Kashmir online and free of charge was to take the film to the masses, and to make it accessible to as many people as possible – in Kashmir, within India and around the world. The full film went online on 26 January 2012, on the Indian Republic day and had over almost fifteen thousand hits that day. Since then, the film has been screened at festivals around the world.

=== No Fathers in Kashmir ===
No Fathers in Kashmir, previously Noor, is a story of hope and forgiveness told through the eyes of two teenagers experiencing first-love and heart break. It is a coming-of-age narrative of innocence and tenderness set in Kashmir. The screenplay of Noor was one of eight projects selected to Sundance Institute / Mumbai Mantra Lab 2014. The script was also awarded a development grant by Asia Pacific Screen Academy.

In February 2016, Noor's Kickstarter campaign raised £74,000 ($100,000). The Kickstarter platform provided funding for the film without being held to anyone else's agendas, or having to compromise the creative vision of the script. To support the crowdfunding campaign, Ashvin travelled across the UK to visit Kashmiri communities in London, Glasgow, Manchester, Rochdale, Bradford, and Birmingham and held free screenings of his films Inshallah, Kashmir and Inshallah, Football.

== Filmography ==
- Road to Ladakh (2003)
- Little Terrorist (short film, 2004)
- The Forest (2009)
- Inshallah, Football (2009)
- Dazed in Doon (2010)
- Inshallah, Kashmir (2012)
- I Am Not Here (2015)
- No Fathers in Kashmir (2019)

== Awards ==
Year	Award	Film	Result
2005	Academy Awards – Oscar	Little Terrorist	Nominated
2005	Almeria International Short Film Festival – Audience Award	Little Terrorist	Won
2005	Aspen Shortsfest – BAFTA/LA Award for Excellence – Honorable Mention	Little Terrorist	Won
2011	Chicago International Film Festival – Gold Hugo	Inshallah, Football	Nominated
2010	Dubai International Film Festival – Muhr Arab Special Mention	Inshallah, Football	Won
2005	European Film Awards – European Film Award	Little Terrorist	Nominated
2004	International Film Festival of Flanders-Ghent – Prix UIP Ghent	Little Terrorist	Won
2004	Manhattan Short Film Festival – Grand Prize	Little Terrorist	Won
2004	Montreal World Film Festival – First Prize (Short Films)	Little Terrorist	Won
2011	National Film Awards, India	Inshallah, Football	Won
2012	National Film Awards, India – Silver Lotus Award	Inshallah, Kashmir	Won
