= Little Terrorist =

- Directed by: Ashvin Kumar
- Written by: Ashvin Kumar
- Produced by: Ashvin Kumar, Dilip Singh Rathore, Sarah Tierney
- Starring: Zulfuqar Ali (Salim), Sushil Sharma, Megnaa Mehtta
- Cinematography: Markus Hürsch
- Music by: Nainita Desai
- Release date: 2004
- Running time: 15 min
- Languages: Hindi; Urdu; Bangla

Little Terrorist is a 2004 Indian short film directed, written and produced by Ashvin Kumar. It was nominated for the 2005 Academy Award for Best Live Action Short Film. Ashvin Kumar is the son of fashion designer Ritu Kumar, and made his debut with Road to Ladakh (2002), starring Irrfan Khan and Koel Purie.

== Production ==
The leading cast of the movie consisted of Zulfuqar Ali (Jamal), Sushil Sharma and Megnaa Mehtta. None of them had ever acted in a movie before this and while Zulfuqar is a street child, Sushil Sharma is a clerk in the government service in Delhi and Megnaa was a 12th standard student at the time of shooting the movie.

The production of the film commenced in November 2003 and was completed in March 2004. The crew were selected by Alipur Films via Shooting People, the online filmmakers community and worked free of cost for the movie and even travelled to India at their own expense.

The movie was shot in the deserts of Rajasthan on a very tight budget. The crew faced various difficulties due to the multilingual production team, remote locations and the shoestring budget. These were further complicated when a tent with the reel burnt down. The crew were however able to salvage the reel from the tent. At another time, a herd of cows stampeded through the shooting location.

== Synopsis ==
The movie revolves around Jamal (played by Salim), a 10-year-old Pakistani Muslim boy. While playing cricket near the Indo Pakistani border, the cricket ball is tossed over to the Indian side of the border separated by a fence.

Jamal crosses the fence to fetch the ball. He is however spotted by the Indian security forces. He hides in an Indian village where he is provided shelter by Bhola (Sushil Sharma), a devout Hindu Brahmin. Both Bhola and his niece, Rani (Megnaa Mehtta), are sceptical about allowing a Muslim boy in their home.

However, when the security forces come looking for Jamal in the village, he is protected by Bhola and Rani.

Jamal does manage to return to Pakistan in the end.

== Cast ==
- Julfuqar Ali – Jamal
- Sushil Sharma – Bhola
- Megnaa Mehtta – Rani

== Crew ==
- Costume Design: Ritu Kumar
- Sound recordist: Roland Heap

== Awards ==
Since its world premiere in September 2004, the film has been invited to 103 film festivals and has won awards in fourteen of them. Chief among them was the nomination for Academy Awards, USA in the Best Live action short films category. It was also nominated for the best short film award in the European Film Awards.

It went on to win the audience award in the Almería International Short Film Festival, the UIP Ghent Award for European Short Films in the Flanders International Film Festival, the grand prize in the Manhattan Short Films festival and the first prize in the Short Films category in the Montréal World Film Festival.

The movie was officially mentioned and selected in various other competitions. It also won an honourable mention by BAFTA LA. It is the first Indian short film to get a theatrical release in India.

The film features on the list of "10 Shorts You Must See" at | url = http://www.making-short-films.com/ |

=== Won ===
- Montreal World Film Festival: 1st Prize.
- Manhattan Film Festival: Best Film.
- Flanders Film Festival: Best Film.
- Tehran International Film Festival: Grand Prize
- Reelworld Film Festival: Bell Expressvu Award.
- Satyajit Ray Foundation: Satyajit Ray Award, Best Short Film.
- Lucania Film Festival: Winner.
- Salento Film Festival: Winner.
- Aspen Shortfest: Honorable Mention by BAFTA/LA.
- Almería International Short Film Festival: Audience Award.
- Temecula Valley International Film Festival: Special Jury Prize.
- Mumbai International Film Festival: Silver Conch.
- Sousse International Film Festival: Winner.
- Buff Film Festival: Winner, Audience Choice.
- São Paulo International Short Film Festival: Audience Favourite.
