= No Fathers in Kashmir =

- Theatrical release poster
- Directed by: Ashvin Kumar
- Screenplay by: Ashvin Kumar
- Produced by: Ashvin Kumar
- Starring: Zara Webb; Soni Razdan; Shivam Raina; Ashvin Kumar; Kulbhushan Kharbanda; Anshuman Jha; Natasha Mago
- Cinematography: Jean-Marc Selva
- Edited by: Thomas Goldser; Ashvin Kumar; Abhro Banerjee
- Music by: Loïk Dury; Christophe ‘Disco’ Minck
- Production company: Alipur Films
- Release date: 5 April 2019
- Running time: 108 minutes
- Country: India
- Languages: English; Urdu; Kashmiri

No Fathers in Kashmir is an Indian drama film directed by Ashvin Kumar. Written by Ashvin Kumar, the film stars Zara Webb, Shivam Raina, Kulbhushan Kharbanda, Anshuman Jha, Natasha Mago, and Sandeep Verma. The film was released on 5 April 2019.

== Plot ==
This is a coming-of-age film about friendship, hope and peace told through the innocent eyes of Nour (16), a smart-talking, selfie-obsessed British-Kashmiri teenager, who finds herself in a small village in Kashmir to meet her grandparents (Kulbhushan Kharbanda & Soni Razdan) who she has never met.

A tender and innocent friendship blossoms between her and a local village boy, Majd (16). She discovers that her dad and Majd's father were inseparable friends too, as young men. As an opaque story of that friendship unravels, so does Nour's curiosity about her father, as she stumbles on a series of long-held secrets.

Finally, she finds out that her father died under strange circumstances. What follows is a quest for answers in which a reluctant Majd finds himself taking her on a journey. They get lost in a dense jungle as they search for the last traces of their fathers without realising that the day has ended. As night falls, they light a bonfire, safe in the silent company of each other and fall asleep.

When they wake up, the teenagers are found by soldiers on patrol. Majd, initially safe from detection, could easily have escaped but he gives up his own safety to come to Nour's rescue. In a heartbreaking twist, Nour is soon released because she is a foreigner with a British passport but Majd is not. The question now is what, if anything, will Noor do to secure Majd's release?

== Cast ==
- Zara Webb as Nour
- Shivam Raina as Majd
- Ashvin Kumar as Arshid
- Kulbhushan Kharbanda as Abdul Rashid
- Maya Sarao as Parvena
- Soni Razdan as Halima
- Anshuman Jha as Army major
- Natasha Mago as Zainab
- Sandeep Verma as Sikh Soldier

== Music ==
The music of the film was composed by Loic Dury and Christophe (disco) Mink, two French composers who heard dozens of versions of the Cholhama Roshay song and decided to make it their inspiration. The film also featured a song by singer Aabha Hanjura.

The music of the film included instruments rarely heard in a sound track like the crystal bashe – an instrument that takes up an entire room to play. The composers never actually met Ali Safuddin. Nor did they ask him to re perform the title track in a studio. They took the same version as he recorded on YouTube sitting by the Dal Lake and added their own magic underneath. When Ali heard it for the first time at the screening of the film he was floored.

== Release ==
=== Censorship Issues ===
An eight-month battle with the Central Board of Film Certification (CBFC) began in July 2018. After the first viewing in October, the CBFC passed the film with an 'A' certificate. In his open letter to the CBFC chair, Kumar stated that for an independent film, this was "as good as banning the film". Upon an appeal to the Film Certification Appellate Tribunal (FCAT) in November, two hearings were organised, one in December and another one in January. Having incorporated a few cuts and disclaimers at the FCAT's request, the film was eventually granted a 'U/A' certificate.

All this while, support from the film fraternity did not slow down. Pritish Nandy and actress Swara Bhaskar lent support to the film. Also expressing her disappointment, actress Alia Bhatt wrote: “Really hope the CBFC would [lift the ban]. It’s a film about empathy & compassion... let’s give love a chance!”

== Critical response ==
No Fathers in Kashmir received glowing reviews from critics and audiences alike making it one of the best reviewed films of 2019.

Udita Jhunjhunwala wrote on Scroll.in that Ashvin Kumar offered a "sobering view of a situation that he seasons with hope". A powerful drama that terrifically encapsulates the robbed childhoods and broken dreams of Kashmiri adolescents, Kumar uses a British-Kashmiri teenage girl to propel his narrative that dwells deep into the darkest, most horrific corners of the valley, writes, Ankur Pathak in Huffingtonpost.in

Utkarsh Mishra of Rediff.com gave 4.5 stars out of 5, writing, "can be watched again and again to understand each and every aspect of it". Samrudhi Ghosh of IndiaToday wrote, "No Fathers In Kashmir leaves you thinking of the thousands of disappeared fathers, sons and brothers long after you leave the theatre". Paulomi Das of Arre thinks that film is a tender portrait of first love in the time of the Kashmir crisis.

Saibal Chaterjee of NDTV gave 3.5 stars out of 5 and commented, "the impact of the quality writing, the steady cinematography and the sharp editing is enhanced significantly by a cast of actors who strike the right notes all the way." Sreeparna Sengupta of Times of India rated it 3.5 stars out of 5. Suguna Sundaram of Cineblitz gave it 4 stars out of 5, applauded the performances and direction, and concluded "This simply told tale touches one deep inside, where it matters.
