= Shirin Sohani =

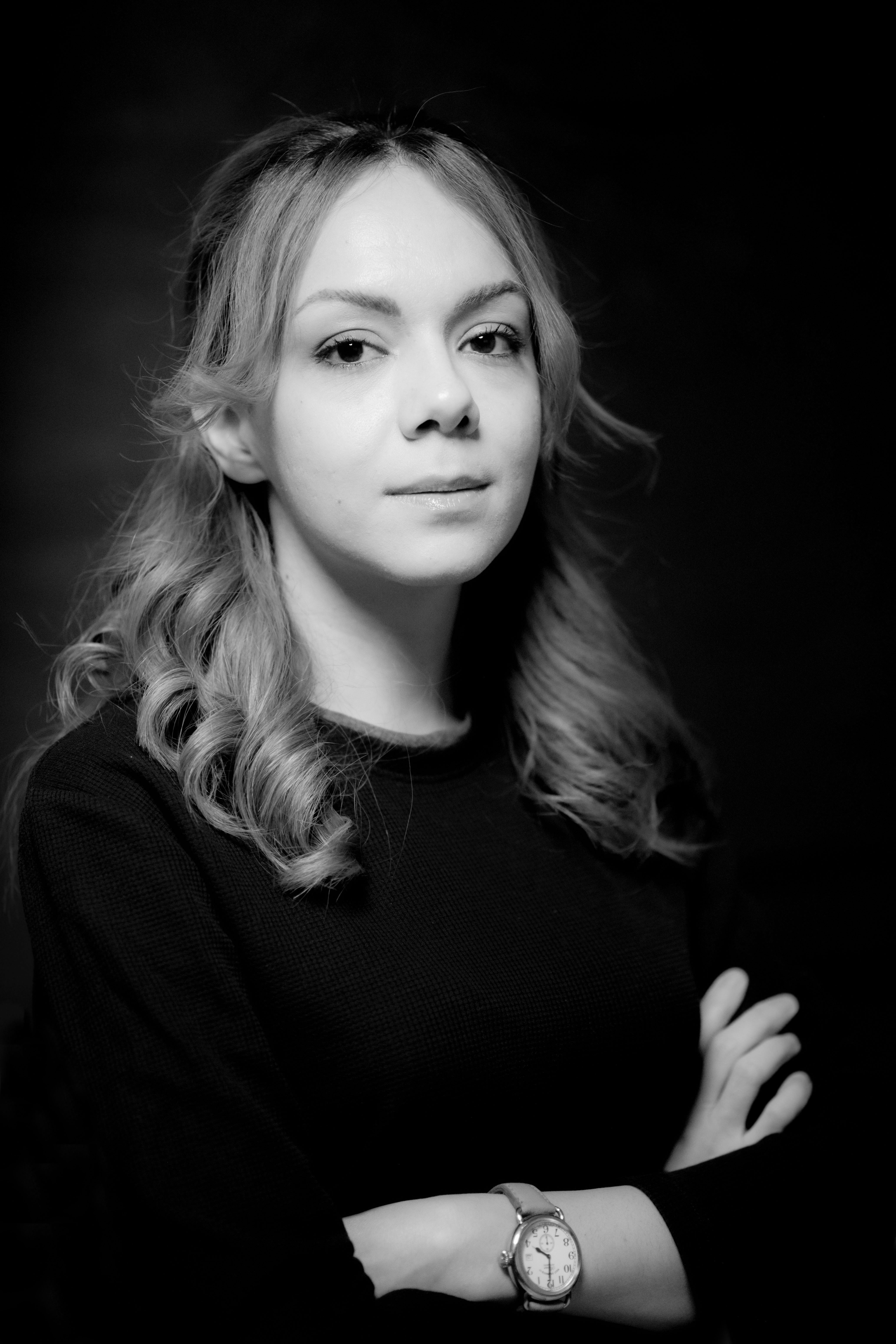
- Sohani in 2024
- Born: 9 August 1986 (age 40); Tehran, Iran
- Education: University of Art
- Occupations: Animation director; designer
- Years active: 2024–present
- Notable work: In the Shadow of the Cypress (2023); Run Rostam Run (2017); The Fan (2014)
- Spouse: Hossein Molayemi

Shirin (Fatemeh) Sohani (born 9 August 1986) is an Iranian animation director and designer.

== Life ==
Sohani graduated with a Bachelor's degree in handicrafts from the University of Art in 2010 and earned a Master's degree in animation from the university's the Faculty of Cinema and Theater in 2013.

In 2025, the short animation In the Shadow of the Cypress, co-directed by Sohani and Hossein Molayemi, won the Academy Award for Best Animated Short Film at the 97th Academy Awards. This achievement marked the first Oscar in the history of Iranian animation.

== Career ==
=== Works ===
- In the Shadow of the Cypress; This collaborative work by Shirin Sohani and Hossein Molayemi was produced by the Institute for the Intellectual Development of Children and Young Adults and has won numerous awards at international festivals, including the Oscar for Best Animated Short Film.
- The Fan
- Run Rostam Run

== Achievements ==
- Best Animation Award at the ANIMARTE Festival, Brazil, 2014
- Best Animation Award at the EASTERN BREEZE Festival, Canada, 2015
- Second Place at the CTLPDX Festival, USA, 2015
- Best Film Award at the Khorshid Film Festival, 2014
- Best Student Director Award at the 9th Tehran International Animation Festival, 2014
- Winner of the Academy Award for Best Animated Short Film ("In the Shadow of the Cypress"), 2025
