= Loghman Khaledi =

Iranian film director, scriptwriter, and film editor

لقمان خالدی Loghman Khaledi
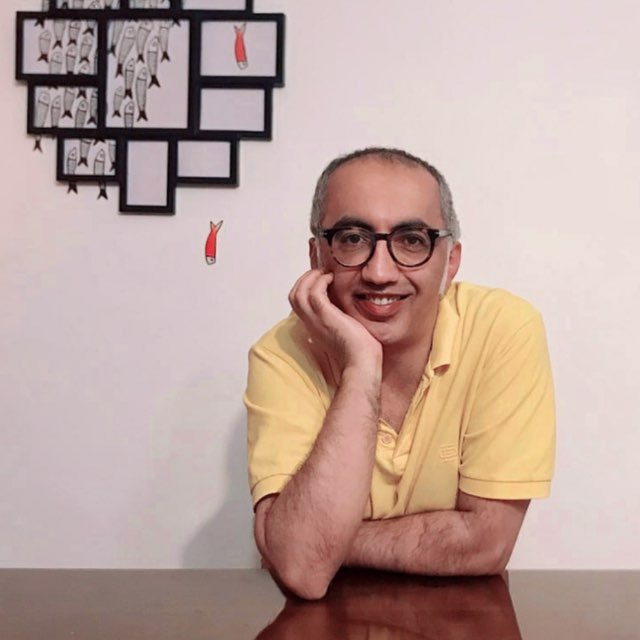
- Loghman Khaledi
- Born: July 23, 1978 (age 48); Kermanshah, Iran
- Occupations: Filmmaker, Film Editor

Loghman Khaledi (born 23 July 1978 in Kermanshah) is an Iranian film director, scriptwriter, and film editor.

In 2001, he made his first film "Focus".

== Filmography ==
Year	English title	Persian	Length	Notes
2011	Moving Up	کمی بالاتر		Documentary- First Prize, FIDMarseille Festival(2011)
2010	Mobile In Tehran	مشترک موردنظر		Documentary
2009	And I Am a Passenger	و من مسافرم		Documentary
2008	Private	خصوصی		Documentary
2007	Without Noise	بی سر و صدا		Documentary
2006	It's Always Late For Freedom	همیشه برای آزادی دیر است		Editor (Director: Mehrdad Oskouei)
2006	The Center Of an X	وسط یه ضربدر		Documentary
2005	A Simple Incident	یک اتفاق ساده		Short Film
2003	The Step	گام		Short Film
2001	Focus	فوکوس		Short Film

== Awards ==
- First Prize of FIDMarseille Festival(2011)
