= Ritu Kumar =

Indian fashion designer

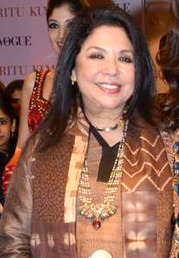
- Kumar in 2012
- Born: November 11, 1944 (age 81); Amritsar, India
- Education: Briarcliff College New York; Lady Irwin College Delhi
- Occupation: Fashion designer
- Labels: Ritu Kumar; Ri; Ritu Kumar Home; LABEL Ritu Kumar
- Children: Ashvin Kumar; Amrish Kumar
- Awards: Padma Shri 2013
- Website: ritukumar.com

Ritu Kumar (born 11 November 1944) is an Indian fashion designer.

== Early life and education ==
The lack of educational opportunities in Amritsar led her to move to Simla for her schooling, where she attended Loreto Convent. She later studied at Lady Irwin College, where she met and married Shashi Kumar, and then went on to accept a scholarship at Briarcliff College in New York, where she studied Art History. On returning to India, she studied museology at the Asutosh Museum of Indian Art, part of the University of Calcutta. Her son is Oscar-nominated director, Ashvin Kumar.

== Career ==
Kumar began her fashion business in Kolkata, using two small tables and hand-block printing techniques. Beginning with bridal wear and evening clothes in the 1960s and 70s, she eventually moved into the international market in the subsequent two decades. As well as shops in India, Kumar's company has also opened branches in Paris, London and New York. The London branch closed after three years, in 1999. Her company's annual turnover at the time was the highest of any Indian fashion outlet, estimated at around ₹10 billion. In 2002 she launched the "Label" line in partnership with her son Amrish. Kumar discusses her career at length in a 2015 interview for the Creating Emerging Markets project at the Harvard Business School, beginning with how she first broke into the Paris and New York fashion houses and department stores in the 1970s.

== Designs ==
Kumar's designs focus on natural fabrics and traditional printing and weaving techniques. She has also included Western elements in her work, but has generally not innovated beyond traditional sari designs. Her clothes have been worn by celebrities such as Princess Diana, Priyanka Chopra, Lara Dutta, Deepika Padukone, Madhuri Dixit Nene, Madhur Jaffrey, Kalki Koechlin, Dia Mirza, Soha Ali Khan and Jemima Goldsmith.

== Awards and recognition ==
In 2013 Ritu Kumar was conferred with the Padma Shri award by the Government of India.

She won the Achievement Award in 2012 at the L’oreal Paris Femina Women’s Awards.
