= Iranian Youth Cinema Society =

Iranian educational film institution

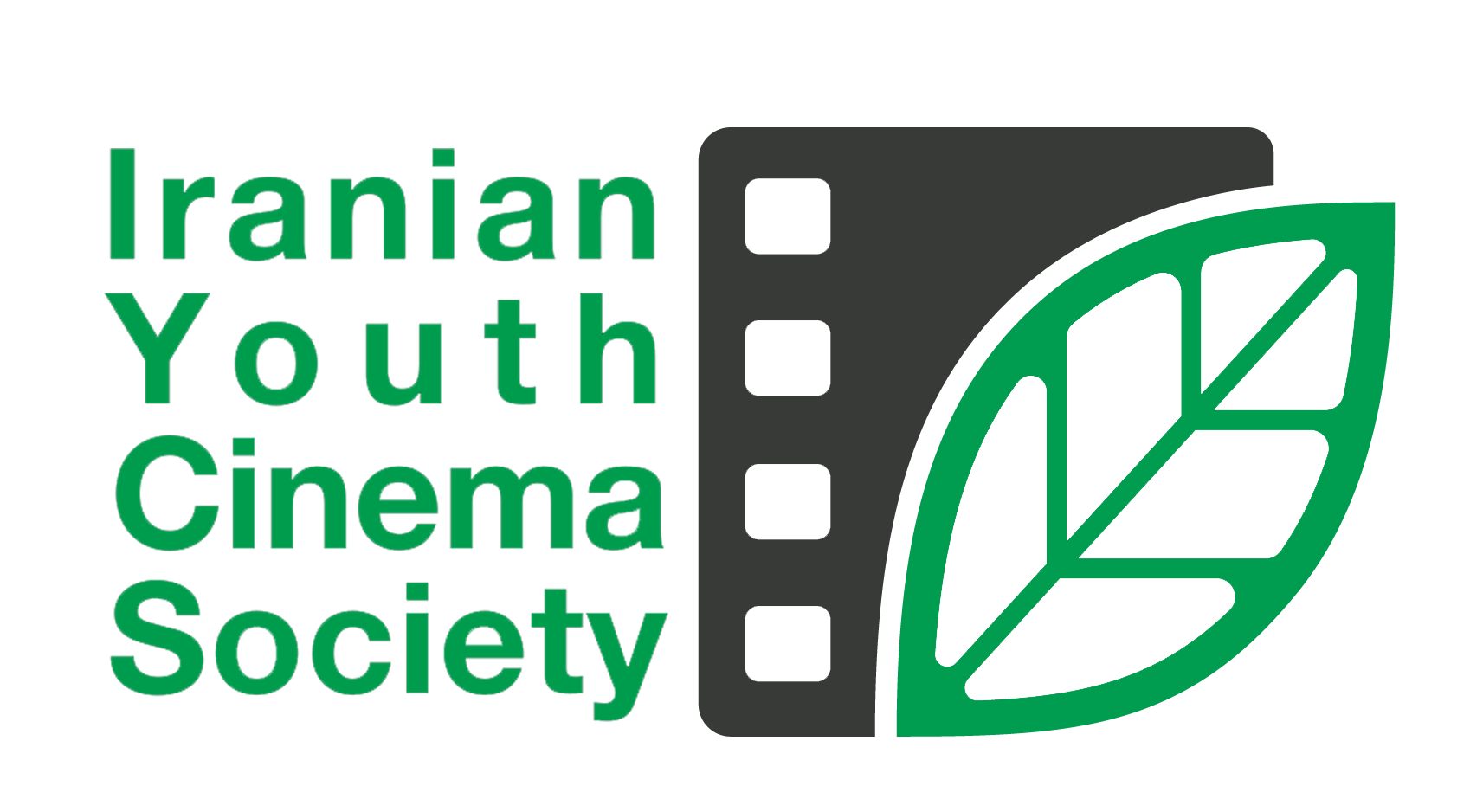
- Logo of Iranian Youth Cinema Society
- Formation: 1976
- Type: Nonprofit organization
- Purpose: “Education and Support of Young and Independent Filmmakers"
- Headquarters: Tehran, Iran
- Executive Director: Behrouz Shoaibi
- Website: iycs.ir

Iranian Youth Cinema Society (IYCS) is an Iranian non-profit educational film institution established in 1976. It is the oldest Iranian Institution dedicated to the education and support of young and independent filmmakers. With a nationwide network of more than 60 official branches and its main office located in Tehran, IYCS serves as the entry point for generations of Iranian cinema professionals to develop their skills and careers.

== Activities and Missions ==
The core mission of IYCS is to discover, train and support emerging talent in the realm of short film, with a focus on developing personal cinematic language, nurturing independent vision, and fostering international presence. The society organizes filmmaking courses for young talents all around the country and helps students specialize in various aspects of cinema. Many of Iran's most well-known and influential filmmakers, like Asghar Farhadi, Shahram Mokri, Reza Mirkarimi, Ida Panahandeh, Hooman Seyedi, Bahman Qobadi and many more are all among IYCS alumnis.

=== Film School and Educational Programs ===
IYCS operates one of the most comprehensive filmmaking training systems in Iran. The film school annually offers both full-time program and single-subject courses at its branches nationwide. Courses cove filmmaking, screenwriting, cinematography, animation, editing, sound recording, and photography, structured across three levels: introductory, intermediate, and advanced.

The flagship program is the comprehensive filmmaking course, held annually with a national entrance exam to select talented students. Additional educational programs include:

==== Comprehensive Courses ====
- Comprehensive filmmaking Course (2 years)
- Comprehensive screenwriting course (1 year)
- Comprehensive Photography course (1 year)

==== Collaborative filmmaking Courses ====
- Fiction collaborative filmmaking course
- Documentary collaborative filmmaking course

==== single-Lesson courses ====
These in-person or online sessions focus on one skill, such as cinematography, editing, or sound. Students receive a certificate upon completion.

==== Instructor-led courses ====
Advanced hands-up workshops led by experienced instructors, aimed at transitioning semi-professionals to the professional level. Applicants must have prior training and have completed one short film at least.

==== Workshops and Panels ====
Held during the Tehran International Short film Festival (TISFF) along with other national short film festivals, these short-term sessions focus on skill-building and knowledge-sharing in short and feature filmmaking, lasting from one day to one week.

==== Filmmaking Camps ====
Month-long group programs led by experienced instructors, designed to inspire filmmaking passion and provide practical experience. Selected students from provincial IYCS offices receive support to collaboratively create a short film in their region.

=== Film Production Support ===
IYCS runs the largest support system for short film production in Iran, utilizing a national online pitching platform. This allows filmmakers across the country to submit their projects, which are then evaluated and, depending on the experience level (debut, semi-professional, or professional), selected for production funding.

Support includes not only financial aid but also guidance through every phase of the filmmaking process, ensuring high standards in pre-production, production, and post production. Each year, IYCS produces numerous short films and facilitates their presentation at international film festivals.

== Productions ==
Some of the IYCS productions and co-productions include internationally acclaimed short films such as:

=== Short Fiction Films ===
- Retouch (2017) (Kaveh Mazaheri)

Winner: Best Narrative Short at Tribeca Film festival

- Related by Blood (2016) (Hosein Amiri-Domari & Pedram Pour-Amiri)

Winner: Best Screenplay Award at Tehran International Short Film Festival

- A Girl in the Room (2016) (Karim Lakzadeh)

Winner: Best Short Film at Beirut International Film Festival

- Like a Good Kid (2018) (Arian Vazirdaftari)

Nominee: Cinéfondation Award at Cannes Film Festival

- The American Bull (2018) (Fatemeh Tousi)

Nominee: International Short Film Festival Oberhausen

- Mask (2021) (Nava Rezvani)

Nominee: Locarno Film Festival

- Falling Up (2022) (Maryam Bakhtiari)

Nominee: Tirana International Film Festival

- Recurrence (2023) (Ali Alizadeh)

Winner: Grand Prix at Tehran International Short Film Festival

- Shalal (2024) (Amir Ali Sisipour)

Nominee: Short Film Grand Jury Prize at Sundance Film Festival

== Festival ==
A major highlight of IYCS's activities is organizing the annual Tehran International short Film Festival (TISSF), held every October. The event is recognized by the Academy of Motion Picture Arts and Sciences (OSCARS®) as an official qualifying festival. The Grand Prize winner of TISSF receives direct entry to the OSCARS® competition. The festival features national and international workshops, master classes, and a variety of sections such as Silk Road (showcase of Asian cinema), Book & Cinema (exploring literature and cinema), and retrospectives.

Alongside TISFF, IYCS organizes three annual domestic festivals-rotated among various cities-to further promote emerging talents nationwide. Only films funded by IYCS compete, and main award winners are granted direct entry to the TISFF.
