= Ashmina =

2018 Nepali-British short film

- Directed by: Dekel Berenson
- Written by: Dekel Berenson
- Produced by: Dekel Berenson; Merlin Merton; Dominic Davey
- Starring: Dikshya Karki
- Release date: 14 October 2018 (United Kingdom)
- Running time: 14 October 2018
- Countries: Nepal; United Kingdom
- Language: Nepali

Ashmina is a 2018 Nepali-British short film written and directed by Dekel Berenson. It is produced by Dekel Berenson and Dominic Davey under the banner of 168 Wardour Filmworks. It stars Dikshya Karki in the lead role alongside Prakat Pageni, Sadhana Bhandari, Sebastian Seitz, Ramona Swhajor, Sachin Ragme, Shyam Khadka, and Charlotte Stade.

== Cast ==
- Dikshya Karki as Ashmina
- Prakat Pageni as Ashmina's Father
- Sadhana Bhandari as Ashmina's Mother
- Sebastian Seitz as David's Friend
- Ramona Swhajor as David's Friend
- Sachin Ragme as Ashmina's Brother
- Shyam Khadka as Money Exchange Clerk
- Charlotte Stade as David's Friend

== Reception ==
=== Awards and nominations ===
Year	Award	Category	Result	Ref(s).
2021	Bahamas International Film Festival	Shorts Prize	Won	
2020	Whistler Film Festival	International ShortWork Award	Won	
2019	Jerusalem Film Festival	Best Live Action Short	Won	
