= Jahangir Almasi =

Iranian actor

- جهانگیر الماسی
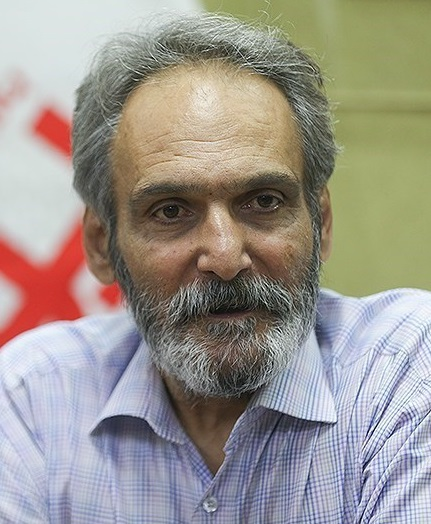
- Born: 9 June 1955 (age 71); Tehran, Iran
- Education: Gondishapur University
- Occupation: Actor
- Years active: 1983–present

Djahangir Almasi (Persian: جهانگیر الماسی, born 9 June 1955 in Tehran, Iran) is an Iranian actor.

He has played different roles in his career, but he is known mainly as an actor who plays serious and intellectual roles. He started his career with Stemming from Blood (1984) and has also directed a short film. Almasi was awarded the lifetime achievement award at the 31st Fajr International Film Festival.

== Selected filmography ==
- Stemming from Blood, 1983
- Monster, 1985
- Spectre of the Scorpion, 1986
- Nar & Ney, 1988
- Portrait of Love, 1990
- The Fall
- End of Childhood, 1993
- Banichaw
- The Poor Lover, 1995
- Sohrab, 1999
- Ranj Va Sarmasti, 1999
- Sib va Salma, 1999
- The Couch, 1999
- The Dinosaur, 1999
- Behind the Mist, 1999
- The Spruce, 1999
- Sohrab, 1999
- The Punishment Committee, 1999
- A Portrait of Love, 1999
- Exit, 2019
