= In the Shadow of the Cypress =

2023 Iranian animated short film

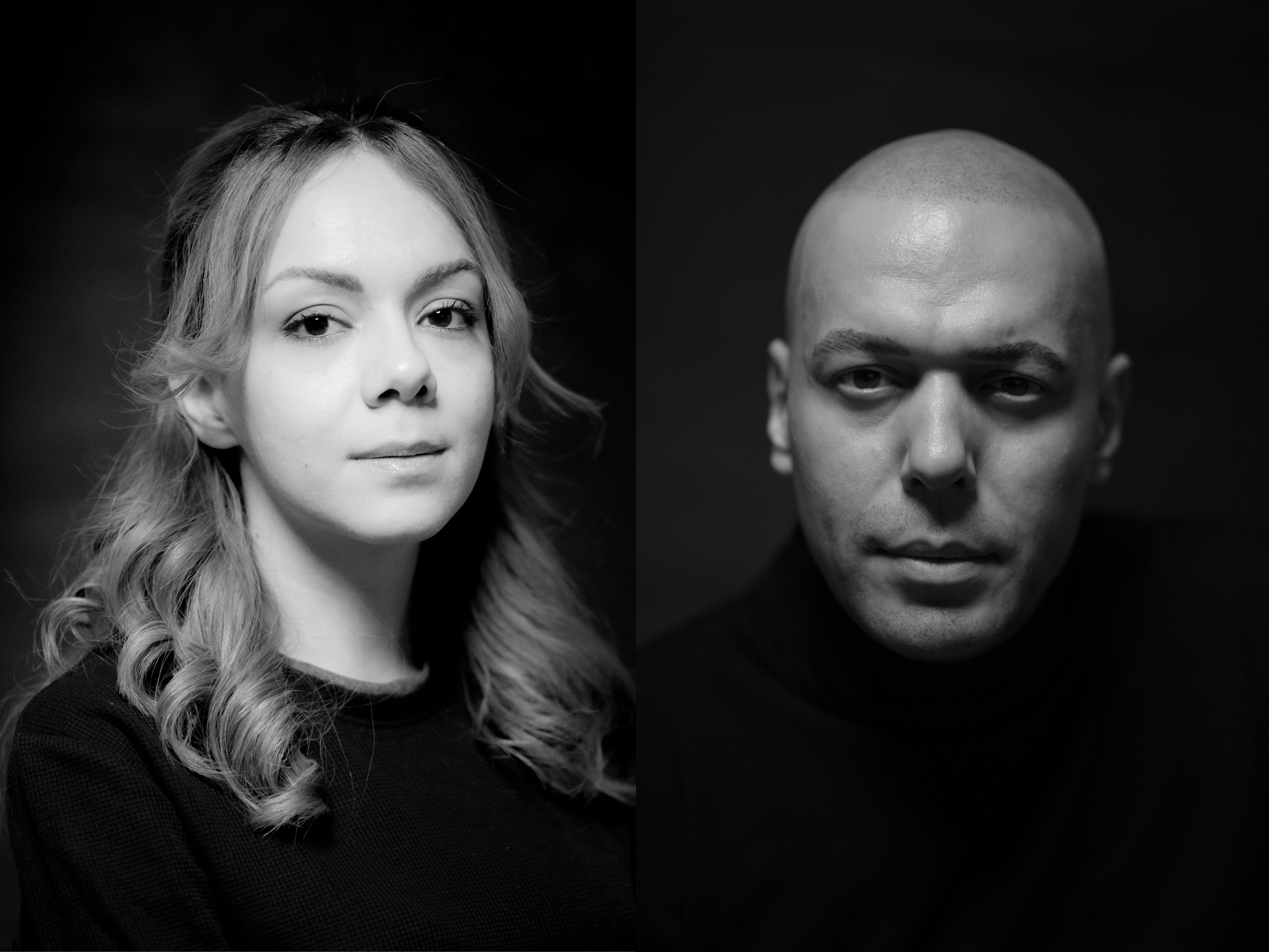
- Shirin Sohani & Hossein Molayemi
- Directed by: Hossein Molayemi; Shirin Sohani
- Produced by: Shirin Sohani; Hossein Molayemi; Institute for the Intellectual Development of Children and Young Adults
- Music by: Afshin Azizi
- Production company: Barfak Studio
- Distributed by: Barfak Studio
- Release date: 2023
- Running time: 20 minutes
- Country: Iran

In the Shadow of the Cypress (Persian: در سایه‌ی سرو, romanized: Dar saaye sarv) is a 2023 Iranian animated short film directed by Hossein Molayemi and Shirin Sohani, produced by the Institute for the Intellectual Development of Children and Young Adults and Barfak Animation Studio. The 20-minute film about PTSD premiered in the Orizzonti section of the 80th Venice International Film Festival in 2023. It won the Academy Award for Best Animated Short Film at the 97th Academy Awards.

== Plot ==
In this minimalistic, dialog-free tale, a former captain, suffering from post-traumatic stress disorder, lives with his daughter in an isolated seaside house. One morning, the father destroys the house in a violent rage and shoves his daughter to the ground. She packs a suitcase and prepares to leave, but is interrupted when she steps outside and discovers a beached whale close to their home.

The father and daughter attempt to rescue the whale by dragging it back into the water with their small motorboat, but the efforts fail. Frustrated, the father returns to his dilapidated ship that is anchored near the whale. Despite the ship's poor condition, he clings to its memory, continuing to paint it and live inside it. However, he suffers traumatic flashbacks of an earlier incident, when the ship was bombed at sea, leading to the death of his wife when their daughter was still a young girl. Meanwhile, the daughter cares for the whale, feeding it water and protecting it from the hot sun. When a flock of seagulls (which had earlier given the father a panic attack) tries to attack the whale to feed on it, the father initially chases them off with a shot from his rifle, but then attempts to shoot the whale while still in a rage. The daughter shoves him away before he can do so. She falls to the ground, devastated that they cannot save the whale. Shaken by the sight of her, the father returns to the ship.

In the morning, the daughter looks out the window and realizes that her father is scuttling his ship, tying it to the whale's tail in an effort to finally save it. The plan works, but the father struggles to free the whale from the rope. The daughter attempts to dive and save him, but cannot. Fortunately, the father eventually floats to the surface, having finally untethered himself from the old boat, and the freed whale swims off into the ocean.

== Accolades ==
On 2 March 2025, the film won the Best Animated Short Film award at the 97th Academy Awards.

Year	Award	Award/Category	Status	Ref
2023	Venice International Film Festival	Venice Horizons Award for Best Short Film	Nominated	
2024	Tribeca Festival	Best Animated Short	Won	
2024	LA Shorts International Film Festival	Best Animation	Won	
2024	Animayo International Film Festival	Grand Jury Award for Best International Film	Won	
2024	SPARK Animation Festival	Best In Show	Won	
2024	Lebu International Film Festival	Best Short Film (International Animation)	Won	
2024	Annecy International Animation Film Festival	Cristal Award for Best Short	Nominated	
2024	Clermont Ferrand International Short Film Festival	Canal+ Award	Nominated	
2024	Melbourne International Film Festival	City of Melbourne Award	Nominated	
2024	Annie Awards	Best Short Subject	Nominated	
2024	Girona Film Festival	Best Romantic story	Won	
2025	Academy Awards	Best Animated Short Film	Won	
