= Da Yie =

2019 short film by Anthony Nti

- Film Poster
- Directed by: Anthony Nti
- Written by: Anthony Nti; Chingiz Karibekov
- Produced by: Anthony Nti; Chingiz Karibekov; Dimitri Verbeek
- Starring: Goua Grovogui; Prince Agortey; Matilda Enchil
- Cinematography: Pieter-Jan Claessens
- Edited by: Frederik Vandewalle
- Production companies: Caviar Films; RITCS; Rondini
- Distributed by: Salaud Morisset
- Release date: October 2019 (Ghent)
- Running time: 20 minutes
- Countries: Belgium; Ghana
- Languages: Akan; French; English

Da Yie (also known by its English title Good Night) is a 2019 short film directed by Anthony Nti.

In 2020, it won the Clermont-Ferrand International Short Film Festival and was amongst the finalists for the BAFTA Los Angeles Student Film Awards.

Da Yie film was produced by Anthony Nti, Chingiz Karibekov and Dimitri Verbeek, and distributed worldwide by the International Production & Distribution company Salaud Morisset.

== Plot ==
Young Matilda and Prince are taken on a life-changing trip by a stranger. Kids, gangsters and Ghana's vibrant coast as you've never seen them.

== Awards ==
Since its launch, the film has been selected in more than 130 festivals around the world. In February 2021, it made the Live Action Short Film shortlist for the 93rd Academy Awards.

Year	Festival	Award/Category	Status
2019	Ghent International Film Festival	Audience Award	Won
2020	Clermont-Ferrand International Short Film Festival	Grand Prix	Won
2020	Palm Springs International ShortFest	Best Student International Short	Nominated
2020	BFI London Film Festival	Best Short Film	Nominated
2020	La Guarimba International Film Festival	Best Fiction Short Film	Nominated
2020	Princeton Independent Film Festival	Grand Jury Award	Won
2020	Galway Film Fleadh	Best International Short Fiction	Nominated
2020	Asiana International Short Film Festival	International Competition	Nominated
2020	GSA BAFTA Student Film Awards	Best Live Action	Nominated
2020	Telluride Film Festival	Great Expectations	Nominated
2020	Fribourg International Film Festival	Special Mention	Won
2020	Melbourne International Film Festival	Grand Prize - Best Short Film	Won
2020	Encounters Film Festival	Brief Encounters Grand Prix	Nominated
2020	Calgary International Film Festival	Best Live Action Short Film	Nominated
2020	Tirana International Film Festival	Best Student Film	Nominated
2020	Indy Shorts International Film Festival	Grand Prize - Best Narrative Short	Won
