= Film screening =

Display of a motion picture

A film screening is the displaying of a motion picture or film, generally referring to a special showing as part of a film's production and release cycle. To show the film to best advantage, special screenings may take place in plush, low seat-count theaters with very high quality (sometimes especially certified) projection and sound equipment, and can be accompanied by food and drink and spoken remarks by producers, writers, or actors. Special screenings typically occur outside normal theatrical showing hours. The different types of screenings are presented here in their order within a film's development.

== Test screening ==
For early edits of a film, informal test screenings are shown to small target audiences to judge if a film will require editing, reshooting or rewriting. At this stage, the film may be incomplete, with missing or unfinished special effects shots, or sound effects, or dialogues which are not yet rerecorded. Audience responses are usually recorded informally. Test audiences may be required not to discuss the film. A film may go through several test screenings.

== Focus group screening ==
Focus group screenings are formal test screenings of a film with very detailed documentation of audience responses. Target audience members answer survey questionnaires and are usually interviewed, sometimes on video. Group discussions following a film with 25–30 viewers are common. Focus audiences may be required not to discuss the film. Their opinion may be recorded by pressing buttons during screening to indicate approval or disapproval. Viewers' faces may be videotaped during the screening. Their involuntary responses may be recorded using galvanic skin response, EKG, or fMRI. Focus group screenings are expensive to run due to the equipment required and large amount of data recorded, so are performed less frequently than informal test screenings. Fully equipped permanent focus-group screening rooms simplify the process, but restrict the location of tests.

== Critic screenings ==
Critic (or "press") screenings are held for national and major market critics in advance of print and television production-cycle deadlines, and are usually by invitation only. This step may be omitted if a studio anticipates negative critical reviews, or if a film is still being edited until its immediate release. The film media will thus append the statement "not screened for critics" in their preview/review columns or segments to give the public notice as such.

== Private screenings ==
Private preview screenings are commonly provided for investors, marketing and distribution representatives, and VIP media figures. While distribution of the film is being sought, such screenings can occur during film festivals, film markets or regular movie theaters.

== Preview screenings ==
Public preview screenings can occur at boutique theaters (which may not be scheduled as a release theater). These may serve as final test screenings used to adjust marketing strategy (radio & TV promotion, etc.) or the film itself. Complimentary tickets, sometimes limited in number, are frequently provided to local media for contests or giveaways. Viewers may be recruited and "prequalified" with a series of questions to determine if they fit the film's target audience. No confidentiality requirement is imposed on the audience, and critics do regularly attend this type of showing if it is the only way to preview the film.

== Sneak preview ==
A sneak preview is an unannounced film screening before formal release, generally with the usual charge for admission. Sneak previews were created in the 1930s to help determine "success and failure factors" of a film, while modern sneak previews provide additional publicity and word-of-mouth exposure for the movie. A sneak preview of a film with bad (or no) prior publicity may be quite poorly received; a by-invitation sneak preview of Francis Ford Coppola's Apocalypse Now was dismissed by attendees as "boring," though it went on to win the Cannes Palme d'Or and a nomination for the Academy Award for Best Picture.

== General release ==
After a combination, or all, of the above, the film goes on general release if taken up by a film distributor.

== Bibliography ==
- Jolliffe, Genevieve; Zinnes, Andrew (2006). The Documentary Film Makers Handbook. Continuum. ISBN 0-8264-1665-9.
- Kerrigan, Finola (2009). Film Marketing. Butterworth-Heinemann. ISBN 978-0-7506-8683-9.
- Marich, Robert (2009). Marketing to Moviegoers: A Handbook of Strategies and Tactics. Chapter 2-Research Audiences and Ads. Southern Illinois University Press; 2nd edition. ISBN 978-0-8093-2884-0.
