= 2024 Cinéfest Sudbury International Film Festival =

- Opening film: The Invisibles by Andrew Currie
- Closing film: Bookworm by Ant Timpson
- Location: Sudbury, Ontario, Canada
- Founded: 1989
- Festival date: September 14–22, 2024
- Website: cinefest.com

Cinéfest Sudbury International Film Festival
- 2025 2023

The 2024 edition of the Cinéfest Sudbury International Film Festival, the 36th edition in the event's history, was held from September 14 to 22, 2024 in Sudbury, Ontario. The first titles in the program were announced on August 13, 2024, with the full program announced on August 22.

In part as a response to a minor controversy earlier in the year, when the Sudbury Wolves limited ticket sales to North Bay residents during the 2023–24 OHL season playoff semifinals against the North Bay Battalion, Cinéfest executive director Patrick O'Hearn announced that the festival was "putting a stop to this", and would offer a special $45 "North Bay Day" pass covering admission to the four North Bay-filmed titles in the festival lineup (Drive Back Home, We Forgot to Break Up, All the Lost Ones and Seeds).

On September 7, the festival announced changes to the final schedule, pulling the previously announced Lucky Star and adding three other titles.

== Awards ==
Award winners were announced on September 26.

Award	Film	Filmmaker
Audience Choice, Feature Film	The Count of Monte Cristo (Le Comte de Monte Cristo)	Matthieu Delaporte, Alexandre de La Patellière
Audience Choice, Feature Film Runner-Up	All Stirred Up! (Tous toqués!)	Manon Briand
Audience Choice, Documentary	Porcelain War	Brendan Bellomo, Slava Leontyev
Audience Choice, Documentary Runner Up	Never Look Away	Lucy Lawless
Audience Choice, Short Film	Karatéka	Florence Fauquet
Audience Choice, Short Film Runner Up	Save Solace	Matt Steeves
Outstanding Canadian Feature	The Mother and the Bear	Johnny Ma
Outstanding International Feature	My Favourite Cake (Keyk-e mahboob-e man)	Maryam Moqadam, Behtash Sanaeeha
Outstanding Female-Led Feature Film	Bird	Andrea Arnold
Cinema Indigenized Outstanding Talent	Red Fever	Neil Diamond, Catherine Bainbridge
French-Language Feature Film	Blue Sky Jo (La petite et le vieux)	Patrice Sauvé
Inspiring Voices and Perspectives	Black Box Diaries	Shiori Itō
Outstanding Short Film	Thirteenth Night	Xiaowen Song
Outstanding Animated Short Film	Tennis, Oranges	Sean Pecknold
Outstanding Northern Ontario Short Film	Ephemera	Cici Clancy
CTV Best in Shorts, Open Category First Place	Ephemera	Cici Clancy
CTV Best in Shorts, Open Category Second Place	The Stain	MJ Dionne
CTV Best in Shorts, Northern Flicks	Save Solace	Matt Steeves

== Official selections ==
=== Gala Presentations ===
English title	Original title	Director(s)	Production country
1995		Ricardo Trogi	Canada
Bob Trevino Likes It		Tracie Laymon	United States
Bookworm		Ant Timpson	New Zealand
The Count of Monte Cristo	Le Comte de Monte Cristo	Matthieu Delaporte, Alexandre de La Patellière	France
Drive Back Home		Michael Clowater	Canada
The Invisibles		Andrew Currie	Canada
The Mother and the Bear		Johnny Ma	Canada, Chile
The Outrun		Nora Fingscheidt	United Kingdom, Germany
Young Werther		José Lourenço	Canada

=== Special Presentations ===
English title	Original title	Director(s)	Production country
40 Acres		R. T. Thorne	Canada
Anora		Sean Baker	United States
The Apprentice		Ali Abbasi	Canada, Denmark, Ireland, United States
Bird		Andrea Arnold	United Kingdom
Blue Sky Jo	La petite et le vieux	Patrice Sauvé	Canada
Can I Get a Witness?		Ann Marie Fleming	Canada
Darkest Miriam		Naomi Jaye	Canada
Disco's Revenge		Omar Majeed, Peter Mishara	Canada
My Favourite Cake	Keyk-e mahboob-e man	Maryam Moqadam, Behtash Sanaeeha	Iran, France, Sweden, Germany
Neon Dreaming	Rêver en néon	Marie-Claire Marcotte	Canada
Never Look Away		Lucy Lawless	New Zealand
Rumours		Guy Maddin, Evan Johnson, Galen Johnson	Canada, Germany
Samia		Yasemin Şamdereli	Italy, Germany, Belgium
Shepherds	Berger	Sophie Deraspe	Canada
Sisters and Neighbors!	Nos belles-sœurs	René Richard Cyr	Canada
The Substance		Coralie Fargeat	United Kingdom, United States, France
Treasure		Julia von Heinz	Germany, France, Poland

=== Features Canada ===
English title	Original title	Director(s)	Production country
Ababooned	Ababouiné	André Forcier	Canada
All Stirred Up!	Tous toqués!	Manon Briand	Canada
All the Lost Ones		Mackenzie Donaldson	Canada
Bonjour Tristesse		Durga Chew-Bose	Canada, Germany
Dada		Aaron Poole	Canada
Die Alone		Lowell Dean	Canada
His Father's Son		Meelad Moaphi	Canada
Hotel Silence	Hôtel Silence	Léa Pool	Canada
Hunting Daze	Jour de chasse	Annick Blanc	Canada
Paying for It		Sook-Yin Lee	Canada
Sharp Corner		Jason Buxton	Canada, Ireland
Shook		Amar Wala	Canada
A Thousand Cuts		Jake Horowitz	Canada
Universal Language	Une langue universelle	Matthew Rankin	Canada
We Forgot to Break Up		Karen Knox	Canada
Who by Fire	Comme le feu	Philippe Lesage	Canada
You Are Not Alone	Vous n'êtes pas seuls	Marie-Hélène Viens, Philippe Lupien	Canada

=== Cana-Doc ===
English title	Original title	Director(s)	Production country
7 Beats per Minute		Yuqi Kang	Canada
Curl Power		Josephine Anderson	Canada
The Hobby		Simon Ennis	Canada
Intercepted		Oksana Karpovych	Canada, France, Ukraine
Kina & Yuk	Kina et Yuk	Guillaume Maidatchevsky	France, Canada, Italy

=== World Cinema ===
English title	Original title	Director(s)	Production country
Crossing		Levan Akin	Sweden, Denmark, France, Turkey, Georgia
A Different Man		Aaron Schimberg	United States
Flow	Straume	Gints Zilbalodis	Latvia, France, Belgium
The Girl with the Needle	Pigen med nålen	Magnus von Horn	Denmark, Poland, Sweden
Good One		India Donaldson	United States
In the Summers		Alessandra Lacorazza Samudio	United States, Mexico
Mamifera		Liliana Torres	Spain
Memoir of a Snail		Adam Elliot	Australia
Misericordia	Miséricorde	Alain Guiraudie	France, Spain, Portugal
The Missile	Ohjus	Miia Tervo	Finland, Estonia
My First Film		Zia Anger	United States
Reinas		Klaudia Reynicke	Switzerland, Peru
Rent Free		Fernando Andrés	United States
The Second Act	Le Deuxième acte	Quentin Dupieux	France
To a Land Unknown		Mahdi Fleifel	United Kingdom, France, Germany, Netherlands, Greece, Qatar, Saudi Arabia, Palestine
Victoria Must Go	Victoria må dø	Gunnbjörg Gunnarsdóttir	Norway

=== World Doc ===
English title	Original title	Director(s)	Production country
Black Box Diaries		Shiori Itō	United States, United Kingdom, Japan
Ernest Cole: Lost and Found		Raoul Peck	France
Mediha		Hasan Oswald	United States, Iraq
Porcelain War		Brendan Bellomo, Slava Leontyev	United States, Australia, Ukraine
Stories and Pictures		Joanna Rudnick	United States
Union		Stephen Maing, Brett Story	United States

=== In Full View: Crisis, Conflict, Conscience ===
English title	Original title	Director(s)	Production country
A House Is Not a Disco		Brian J. Smith	United States
Who Do I Belong To	Mé el Aïn	Meryam Joobeur	Tunisia, France, Canada, Norway, Qatar, Saudi Arabia

=== Cinema Indigenized (Nishnaabek Dbaajmawaat) ===
English title	Original title	Director(s)	Production country
Aberdeen		Ryan Cooper, Eva Thomas	Canada
Red Fever		Neil Diamond, Catherine Bainbridge	Canada
Seeds		Kaniehtiio Horn	Canada

=== Cinema 9 Prime Time ===
English title	Original title	Director(s)	Production country
Home Free		Avi Federgreen	Canada
Morningside		Ron Dias	Canada

=== Short Circuit ===
English title	Original title	Director(s)	Production country
Anywhere	Nooj Goji	Evelyn Pakinewatik	Canada
Le Charade		Erika Totoro	United States
Curveball		Igor Petrov	Canada
Deadpan		Aidan Cheeatow	Canada
The End of Love		Yanwenjun Liu	China
Ephemera		Cici Clancy	Canada
Karatéka		Florence Fauquet	France
The Painted Night		Ben Bruhmuller	Canada
Rapture	Le Ravissement	Camille Trudel	Canada
Save Solace		Matt Steeves	Canada
Simp		Gabriel Carnick	United States
Summer Love		Virgile Ratelle	Canada
Tennis, Oranges		Sean Pecknold	United States
Thirteenth Night		Xiaowen Song	China
Unclean		Simon Chouinard	Canada
Wifi		Ted Sakowsky	Canada
Zoé		Rémi St-Michel	Canada

=== CTV Best in Shorts ===
The festival's dedicated competition for amateur short filmmakers from Northern Ontario.

English title	Original title	Director(s)	Community
Cupid's Assist		Richard Barlow	Sudbury
Ephemera		Cici Clancy	Sudbury
How to Eat a Rainbow		Tom Reid	Sudbury
Lucy's Birthday		Liam Siebolt	North Bay
The Painted Knight		Ben Bruhmuller	Sudbury
Save Solace		Matt Steeves	Temagami
The Snipers		Kelly Saxberg	Thunder Bay
The Stain		MJ Dionne	Sudbury
