= All Stirred Up! =

2024 Canadian comedy film

- Film poster
- French: Tous toqués!
- Directed by: Manon Briand
- Written by: Manon Briand
- Produced by: Pierre Even
- Starring: Julie Le Breton; Édouard Baer
- Cinematography: Jean-François Lord
- Edited by: Yvann Thibaudeau
- Music by: Michel Corriveau
- Production company: Item 7
- Distributed by: Sphere Films
- Release date: September 13, 2024
- Running time: 90 minutes
- Country: Canada
- Language: French

All Stirred Up! (French: Tous toqués!) is a Canadian comedy film, directed by Manon Briand and released in 2024. The film stars Julie Le Breton as Sonia, a Canada Customs border agent who confiscates the contents of a car being driven by French chef Victor (Édouard Baer), only to subsequently need his help when her daughter Lili-Beth (Élodie Fontaine) decides to enter a cooking competition despite barely knowing how to cook.

The cast also includes Sylvain Marcel, Dominic Paquet, Normand Chouinard, Michèle Deslauriers, Oussama Fares, Agathe Ledoux and Douaa Kachache in supporting roles.

== Production ==
The film entered production in 2023, originally under the working title Le Chef et la douanière.

The preparations for its release were complicated by the revelation of prior sexual assault allegations against Baer in spring 2024, with the producers deciding to proceed with the film's release while excluding Baer from its promotion.

== Release ==
The film opened theatrically on September 13, 2024, in Quebec. It also screened at the 2024 Cinéfest Sudbury International Film Festival, where it was the runner-up for the Audience Choice Award.

== Critical response ==
The film received mixed reviews.

In La Presse, Manon Dumais wrote: "Manon Briand's sixth feature film (La turbulence des fluides, 2 secondes, Liverpool), Tous toqués! is an awkward hybrid between a family comedy and a romantic comedy. Full of good intentions, populated by characters bordering on caricature, and intended to be a celebration of solidarity and diversity, the story evolves at a lethargic pace that even Yvann Thibaudeau's playful editing cannot bring out of its torpor."

For the Salmon Arm Observer, Joanne Sargent stated in her Cinemaphile column: "Tous Toques is a gem of a movie about the unexpected twists that shape our experiences. It’s positive, funny and refreshing."

In Le Journal de Montréal, Maxime Demers wrote: "The intentions are good, but the result is not entirely convincing. Despite a few good moments here and there, the film does not avoid certain clichés of the genre (we are thinking in particular of the inevitable gags about the culture shock experienced by the French chef in Quebec) and suffers from a scenario that is too conventional and predictable."
