= Noriyuki Yamaguchi =

Japanese journalist

- 山口 敬之
- Born: 4 May 1966 (age 60); Tokyo, Japan
- Education: Keio University
- Occupations: Journalist, former director of Tokyo Broadcasting System Television, think tank visiting researcher
- Years active: 1990–present
- Known for: Authoring a biography of Shinzo Abe; Rape allegations
- Political party: Liberal Democratic Party

Noriyuki Yamaguchi (山口 敬之, Yamaguchi Noriyuki; born 1966) is a former Japanese journalist and a biographer of former Japanese Prime Minister Shinzo Abe. He has been accused of the rape of Shiori Itō, while she was an intern at Thomson Reuters. His denials and the police's refusal to press the charges against Yamaguchi sparked the growth of the MeToo movement in Japan.

== History ==
Noriyuki Yamaguchi was born in Tokyo, Japan, in 1966. He attended the Keio University Faculty of Economics. He later joined the Tokyo Broadcasting System Television where he was assigned to the news department as a photojournalist. His overseas assignments included London, England, Phnom Penh, Cambodia, and Washington, DC, US. After retiring, he appeared on TV programs such as TV Asahi and Fuji TV and on the radio.

On 23 April 2015, he was dismissed as Washington bureau chief and moved from the news bureau to the sales bureau. On 30 May 2016, he left TBS Television to become a visiting fellow at the East West Center, an American think tank, with journalists.

According to Yamaguchi's Facebook account, he is now self-employed.

== Biographer for Shinzo Abe ==
Yamaguchi is the personal biographer for Shinzo Abe, the former prime minister of Japan. He published two books while Abe was still the incumbent prime minister.

== Works ==
- America Invaded by China (中国に侵略されたアメリカ)
- Prime Minister (総理)
- Dark Fight (暗闘)

== Civil Lawsuits ==
Shiori Itō formally filed a lawsuit against Yamaguchi in September 2017 for raping her in a hotel on 4 April 2015. Itō previously filed a police report in July 2016, although it was dropped by prosecutors for insufficient evidence. Itaru Nakamura, a close confidant of both Prime Minister Abe and Yamaguchi and acting chief of the Tokyo Metropolitan Police Department Investigative Division at the time, admitted in the weekly magazine Shukan Shincho to having halted the probe and arrest warrant. Itō subsequently filed a complaint with the Committee for the Inquest of Prosecution, but a September 2017 ruling did not charge Yamaguchi since "there was no common law basis to overturn."

A Tokyo court in December 2019 awarded Itō 3.3 million yen (US$30,000) plus additional fees in damages from Yamaguchi; however, he stated that he would appeal the decision. (She had initially sought from Yamaguchi 11 million yen (US$100,000) in compensation.) Yamaguchi denied the charges and filed a countersuit against Itō, seeking 130 million yen (US$1,180,000) in compensation, claiming the incident was consensual and the ensuing accusations has damaged his reputation, although that suit was later turned down due to inconsistencies in his testimony. This ruling has garnered international attention due to the underreporting of sexual assaults and rape in Japan, and the number of societal and legal obstacles Itō had to endure for speaking up.

The Japanese high court upheld the lower court ruling in favor of Itō, ordering Yamaguchi to pay 3.3 million yen to her. The presiding judge concluded that Yamaguchi began sexual intercourse with an unconscious Itō. The court also ordered Itō to pay 550,000 yen to Yamaguchi for damages for defaming him by the claim in her book accusing him of giving her a date drug, with no evidence. Both have appealed their rulings.

In the final appeal in 2022, the Supreme Court rejected Yamaguchi's appeal. The second trial judgment, which found that Yamaguchi had engaged in sexual acts without consent and ordered him to pay compensation of approximately 3.32 million yen, was finalized. In a decision dated 7 July 2022, the Supreme Court ruled that there were no grounds for appeal, such as a violation of the constitution.

Itō's book Black Box, published in Japanese and English talks about the incident and her experiences that followed. Itō's film Black Box Diaries received critical acclaim and was named one of the top 5 documentary films of 2024 by the National Board of Review and nominated for Best Documentary Feature Film in the 97th Academy Awards.

== Disputes with Yoshinori Kobayashi ==
On 24 January 2019, Yamaguchi filed a civil suit against cartoonist Yoshinori Kobayashi. Yamaguchi stated that Kobayashi disseminated false information completely different from the facts in the manga Gomanism Declaration drawn by Kobayashi in the SAPIO magazine's August 2017 issue, where Yamaguchi was depicted as a criminal.
