= Black Box Diaries =

2024 documentary film by Shiori Itō

- Theatrical release poster
- Directed by: Shiori Itō
- Produced by: Eric Nyari; Hanna Aqvilin; Shiori Itō
- Cinematography: Hanna Aqvilin; Yuta Okamura; Shiori Itō; Yuichiro Otsuka
- Edited by: Ema Ryan Yamazaki
- Music by: Mark Degli Antoni
- Production companies: Hanashi Films; Cineric Creative; Star Sands; Spark Features
- Distributed by: MTV Documentary Films (United States); Dogwoof (United Kingdom)
- Release dates: January 20, 2024 (Sundance); October 25, 2024 (United States); October 25, 2024 (United Kingdom)
- Running time: 103 minutes
- Countries: Japan; United States; United Kingdom
- Languages: English; Japanese
- Box office: $27,788

Black Box Diaries (Japanese: ブラック・ボックス・ダイアリーズ, romanized: Burakku Bokkusu Daiarīzu) is a 2024 documentary film directed by Shiori Itō. The film chronicles her investigation into her own sexual assault case.

The film premiered at the 2024 Sundance Film Festival. It was released in the United States and United Kingdom on October 25, 2024, by MTV Documentary Films and Dogwoof, respectively. The film was named one of the top 5 documentary films of 2024 by the National Board of Review, won a Peabody Award, and was nominated for Best Documentary Feature Film in the 97th Academy Awards.

== Synopsis ==
This film, her feature-length directorial debut, depicts Shiori Itō's journey into her investigation of the sexual violence she experienced.

When Itō met with Noriyuki Yamaguchi, he was the Washington, D.C. bureau chief of TBS, a major broadcaster in Japan. He was famous for his articles on Prime Minister Shinzo Abe and known for having ties with influential government officials.

The film starts with security camera footage of a hotel in Tokyo, showing a taxi at the entrance. In this video, Yamaguchi is dragging the severely intoxicated Itō out of the car and holding her up as he heads toward the hotel room.

After this night, Itō filed a report with the police, claiming that she had been sexually assaulted using a date rape drug. However, the police refused to accept the case, citing a lack of evidence beyond Itō's memory.

When Itō's side obtained the hotel surveillance footage, the police began to move forward with Yamaguchi's arrest and investigation. However, as police were waiting – with the arrest warrant – for Yamaguchi to disembark a flight, they received orders to halt immediately; the investigation was inexplicably halted, and the case was dropped without indictment. In late 2017, Michiyoshi Yunoki, a politician in Japan's House of Representatives, asked in a House hearing if the arrest had been halted because negative publicity at the time might have prevented Yamaguchi's biography of Abe from being published.

Faced with the failure of the investigation, Itō decided to come forward publicly. She attended the press conference in person, and made an accusation by revealing both her own and the other party's real names. This was extremely rare in cases of sexual violence in Japan and sparked widespread public reaction. As a pioneering figure in Japan's MeToo movement, which was gaining momentum worldwide at the time, a wave of support arose from women who resonated with Itō's experience. However, she also faced a storm of online slander, with accusations that she had a political intention aimed at attacking the government.

Enduring a storm of relentless defamation and the anguish of sexual violence, Itō continued investigating the case for over 7 years and ultimately won a civil lawsuit against Yamaguchi.

After Itō's historic accusation, several women in Japan also came forward with their real names to report sexual violence. This movement served as a catalyst, leading to the revision of laws on sexual offenses in 2023, making non-consensual sexual acts legally punishable in Japan, as in other countries.

One of the key figures in the film is "Detective A". He was the one who directly leaked to Itō the crucial information that an arrest warrant had been issued but suppressed. The film suggests this decision was made by high-ranking government officials.

Constructed with her smartphone recordings and other private video footage, the documentary depicts Itō's agony and reflections, shedding light on the sexual violence in Japan.

== Production ==
The film is based on the 2017 memoir written by Itō. The film was produced over six years, beginning shortly after Itō held a press conference to publicly accuse a prominent journalist of sexual assault.

It is directed by Itō and co-produced by her along with Hanna Aqvilin and Eric Nyari. The worldwide box office revenue was $7,000 on its opening weekend and totaled approximately $33,000 as of early March 2023. It was nominated for 33 film awards and won 21 of them.

== Release ==
The film had its world premiere at the 2024 Sundance Film Festival on January 20 as part of the World Cinema Documentary Competition. It also screened at South by Southwest on March 10, 2024, CPH:DOX on March 18, 2024, and Hot Docs Canadian International Documentary Festival on April 29, 2024.

In May 2024, MTV Documentary Films and Dogwoof acquired US and UK distribution rights to the film, respectively.

The film was screened at the Melbourne International Film Festival in Melbourne, Australia, in August 2024.and at the 2024 Adelaide Film Festival in October.

The film competed in the Documentary Competition category at the 20th Zurich Film Festival in October 2024.4, where it won the Golden Eye for best Documentary and the Audience Award across all competing entries.

On February 4, 2025, in the UK, the BBC first broadcast the documentary film as Episode 2 of Series 29 of their long-running documentary film strand Storyville, as part of the 2025 series.

In early 2025, the film was nominated for an Academy Award in the Best Documentary Feature Film category.

=== Japan ===
Initially there was concern that the film would not be released in Japan. Co-Producer Eric Nyari stated that Japanese cinemas, "including the ones we were most hoping for," are "owned by large corporations that also own hotels," making this film "a particularly sensitive case for them." Two French organizations jointly launched a Change.org petition calling for the film's immediate release in Japan.

In an interview, Ito herself commented that Japanese distributors "know that this is not a legal issue, but they are afraid of public opinion." She added, "The people I most want to see this film are those in Japan. Criticism and debate are inevitable, but first, I just want people to watch it." The film was finally released theatrically in Japan on December 12th, 2025. For its release, Ito made changes and adjustments to address Japanese privacy concerns such as blurring some faces while preserving the substance and message of the film.

== Reception ==
=== Critical response ===
On the review aggregator website Rotten Tomatoes, 99% of 72 critics' reviews are positive, with an average rating of 8.3/10. The website's consensus reads: "A deeply personal and courageous act of vulnerability created through an exercise of revelations makes Black Box Diaries a testament of Shiori Itō's commitment to truth and justice for all." Metacritic, which uses a weighted average, assigned the film a score of 82 out of 100, based on 18 critics, indicating "universal acclaim".

Manohla Dargis of The New York Times wrote, "Black Box Diaries is, at heart, a first-person account, and while it's successful on those terms, it's finally more emotionally engaging than intellectually satisfying." Richard Brody of The New Yorker wrote, "Ito unstintingly records the enormous emotional toll that the assault, the legal cases, and her pursuit of justice took on her, and she does so with an unsparingly candid cinematic sensibility." Lovia Gyarke of The Hollywood Reporter called the film "a visceral testimony of survival and recourse" and wrote, "Where Ito's film distinguishes itself is in the diaristic iPhone videos", which "reclaim the idea of testimony, changing it from a public act to an urgent and healing private one".

Nicolas Rapold of the Financial Times found the film "genuinely empowering", writing that its "mix of vérité filmmaking and audio-only interviews ... makes for a visceral account of the ups and downs of her journey". Nell Minow of RogerEbert.com found the film "intimate, achingly personal" and "a testament to her courage", giving it three and a half out of four stars. Lex Briscuso of TheWrap described Black Box Diaries as "a stunning, effective tale of reclaiming victimhood and the fight for justice" and "a selfless gift meant to show other survivors that it is possible to not only rebuild your inner sanctuary, but to seek meaningful justice".

Fionnuala Halligan of Screen Daily wrote, "Black Box Diaries is one of the discoveries of this year's Sundance film festival: it seems to encapsulate a generation's dreams and disappointments, torments and triumphs." Guy Lodge of Variety described the film as a "tightly wound, heart-on-sleeve procedural documentary". Justin Chang of the Los Angeles Times called the film "a tough, harrowing work of self-portraiture". Valerie Complex of Deadline wrote, "Precise filmmaking puts us in [Itō's] mindset through this exhausting investigation, capturing the sadness, joy and determination pushing her forward despite all momentum against her." Drew Burnett Gregory of Autostraddle wrote that the film reveals "not only the facts of her case, but the immense toll this fight takes on her life".

Filmmaker Atsushi Funahashi and historian Chelsea Szendi Schieder wrote that the film has "the subversiveness of a good documentary" in which each viewer can "understand the social phenomena depicted therein as problems that permeate the entire society", and that the hotel footage should be shown so that administrative and legislative failure can be confronted, but that the footage and audio of civilians such as the taxi driver and journalists should be authorized or obscured.

=== Accolades ===
Award	Date	Category	Recipient	Result	Ref.
Sundance Film Festival	28 January 2024	World Cinema Documentary Grand Jury Prize	Black Box Diaries	Nominated	
CPH:DOX	24 March 2024	Human:Rights Award	Black Box Diaries	Won	
Hong Kong International Film Festival	8 April 2024	Golden Firebird Award – Documentary Competition	Black Box Diaries	Nominated	
San Francisco International Film Festival	28 April 2024	Best Documentary Feature	Black Box Diaries	Nominated	
San Francisco International Film Festival	28 April 2024	Special Jury Award	Black Box Diaries	Won	
Seattle International Film Festival	27 May 2024	Best Documentary	Black Box Diaries	Runner-up	
Seattle International Film Festival	27 May 2024	Lena Sharpe Award for Persistence of Vision	Black Box Diaries	Won	
Seattle International Film Festival	27 May 2024	Best Director	Shiori Itō	3rd Runner-up	
Cinéfest Sudbury International Film Festival	22 September 2024	Inspiring Voices and Perspectives Award	Black Box Diaries	Won	
Zurich Film Festival	13 October 2024	Best International Documentary Film	Black Box Diaries	Won	
Critics' Choice Documentary Awards	10 November 2024	Best True Crime Documentary	Black Box Diaries	Nominated	
National Board of Review	4 December 2024	Top 5 Documentaries	Black Box Diaries	Won (Note: This award does not have a single winner, but recognizes multiple films.)	
International Documentary Association Awards	5 December 2024	Best Feature Documentary	Eric Nyari, Hanna Aqvilin, and Shiori Itō	Nominated	
International Documentary Association Awards	5 December 2024	Best Director	Shiori Itō	Nominated	
International Documentary Association Awards	5 December 2024	Emerging Filmmaker Award	Shiori Itō	Won	
International Documentary Association Awards	5 December 2024	Best Editing	Ema Ryan Yamazaki	Nominated	
Astra Film Awards	8 December 2024	Best Documentary Feature	Black Box Diaries	Nominated	
Alliance of Women Film Journalists	7 January 2025	Best Documentary Film	Black Box Diaries	Nominated	
Cinema Eye Honors	9 January 2025	Outstanding Non-Fiction Feature	Shiori Itō, Eric Nyari, Hanna Aqvilin, Ema Ryan Yamazaki, Yuta Okamura, Yuichiro Otsuka, Mark degli Antoni, and Andrew Tracy	Nominated	
Cinema Eye Honors	9 January 2025	Outstanding Debut	Shiori Itō	Nominated	
Cinema Eye Honors	9 January 2025	The Unforgettables	Shiori Itō	Won	
British Academy Film Awards	17 February 2025	Best Documentary	Shiori Itō, Eric Nyari, and Hanna Aqvilin	Nominated	
Academy Awards	2 March 2025	Best Documentary Feature Film	Shiori Itō, Eric Nyari, and Hanna Aqvilin	Nominated	
Peabody Awards	1 May 2025	Documentary	Hanashi Films, Cineric Creative, and Star Sands	Won	
Golden Trailer Awards	29 May 2025	Best Foreign Documentary	MTV Documentary Films / Jump Cut	Nominated	

== Controversy ==
In October 2024 and February 2025, Itō's former legal representatives held two press conferences, claiming that video footage from Itō's film had been used without authorization and that the matter raised serious ethical concerns.

According to the lawyers, the hotel surveillance footage used in the film was obtained under an agreement with the hotel, which stipulated that it would only be used as evidence in Itō's legal proceedings. Additionally, they pointed out several issues of the film:

1. The film includes footage of a key witness, a taxi driver, who had refused to testify under oath in Itō's trial, without proper source protection.
2. Audio recordings of Ito's talk with "Detective A," a confidential source for Itō, were used without proper source protection.
3. Conversations with some attorneys were recorded without consent and were presented in the film in a way that appeared to obstruct Itō's efforts.

The former legal representatives argued that these issues infringed on the rights of interviewees and collaborators. In particular, they raised concerns that the public release of the hotel surveillance footage, in violation of the agreement, could deter future cooperation in cases involving sexual violence.

Attorney Yoko Nishihiro, who served as Itō's legal representative for eight and a half years and led her to victory in her civil lawsuit, stated that she had warned Itō about these issues as early as December 2023. According to Nishihiro, Itō had promised that she would be allowed to review the film before its completion, but this promise was not kept. She first saw the film’s content at a preview screening and was shocked by what she witnessed. Nishihiro explained that after this incident, Itō unilaterally cut off communication with her former legal team and filed a request for a dispute mediation with the Tokyo Bar Association.

At the time of the second press conference in February 2025, Itō's side issued a statement acknowledging that the film still had unresolved authorization issues. They apologized and announced their intention to produce a revised version for domestic release in Japan.

In response, the former legal representatives pointed out that the film had already been widely screened at numerous international film festivals and argued that producing a revised version would not resolve the essential problems.

During the February press conference, Nishihiro expressed her distress, stating that despite dedicating eight and a half years of time and effort to protecting Itō, she felt "miserable" after being accused by Itō's side of harboring "immeasurable malice." She emphasized that because Ito is an influential figure, she must abide by rules and uphold ethical standards. Another lawyer, who is a member of the legal team, criticized Ito, stating that "Never repay kindness with ingratitude." has long been a social convention in Japan.

In the February 2025 press conference, Itō had been announced in advance that she would also hold a press conference and screen a revised version of the film there. However, due to Itō’s poor health, a doctor’s order prevented her from proceeding, resulting in the cancellation of both the press conference and the screening. On the day of the event, statements from Itō herself, her current representative, and her attending physician were released.

=== Women's gathering scene ===
On January 14, 2025, the Tokyo Shimbun, one of the major newspapers in Japan, published an article addressing the unauthorized use of footage, specifically a sequence from a meeting in December 2017, in which about 30 participants discussed Itō's sexual violence case.

The BBC-affiliated crew had documented the event, filming Itō, who was invited as a speaker, under the condition that other participants would only be filmed from behind. In accordance with this agreement, the footage in the film was shot from the back of the room, depicting only the participants' backs or partial side profiles. While most participants shared general opinions, one woman disclosed her personal experience of sexual abuse.

The original title of the Tokyo Shimbun article was "Video footage of woman speaking of her own sexual assault case used without permission. (Note: Japanese: 『性被害』語る女性の映像を許諾なく使用.)" According to the newspaper, some participants also complained, stating that they had not given permission for their footage to be used in the film.

But Itō's side claimed this was incorrect because the woman had given her consent. The newspaper apologized and corrected the article on February 7.

On February 10, 2025, Itō filed a defamation lawsuit seeking 3.3 million yen in damages against Tokyo Shimbun journalist Isoko Mochizuki, who wrote the article, arguing that her first article on January 14 portrayed her as egotistical and selfish.

=== Reactions to the controversy ===
- On February 16, 2025, the Women's Association for Peace and Against Military Bases and Militarization Across Japan, (Note: 平和を求め軍拡を許さない女たちの会) headed by Yūko Tanaka, former president of Hosei University, released a statement urging Itō to remove unauthorized scenes from the film. It stated, "Black Box Diaries is a record of the gross human rights violations against Shiori Ito, which has extremely important significance in society. However, we recognize that in releasing this film, Shiori Ito failed to communicate carefully with her sources of information and, as a result, violated their human rights."
- Rina Hasumi, a writer, raised the criticism that the film received high praise in the English-speaking world because Itō, who is fluent in English, was the only involved party to directly communicate with the international audience. She argued that foreign media have accepted Itō's explanation without question — that the reason the film is not being screened in Japan lies in cultural and social issues.
- Eri Shibata, a writer and artist, accused Itō that she appeals to foreign media as if she were being silenced by Japan’s conservative society and those in power, but the Black Box Diaries is not being prevented from being released due to government censorship. Shibata argued an indifferent society toward victims of sexual violence is not relevant in this case. Shibata also wrote that if foreign media refer only to Itō’s statements without considering why the film is controversial in Japan, they are merely indulging in "an orientalist desire" for the narrative of the “beautiful female victim and the savage East.”
- Documentary filmmaker Yang Yong-hi fiercely condemned Itō for avoiding explanations regarding the alleged issues in the film. She also criticized her for failing to address controversies over permissions and other problems related to the film at international festivals such as BAFTA, instead reducing her explanations to the immaturity of Japanese society—an act she denounced as a crude attempt at manipulation. Regarding the February press conference, she stated, "Doctor’s orders or not, she should have crawled there to explain it by herself."
- The Nikkei, a major business newspaper in Japan, argued in a column: "The informant's facial expressions and voice convey Ms. Itō's desperate emotions in a realistic manner, but there is no public interest. The unauthorized use of inadequately processed material violates journalistic ethics. The same applies to the lawyer's voice."

== Responses to criticism ==
After the press conference held by her former representatives, Itō acknowledged and apologized for some of the issues, admitting certain errors, and announced that a revised version of the film would be produced. However, she still argues that the use of some footage in the film can be justified.

=== Hotel security camera footage ===
According to Itō, the hotel security camera footage was obtained from the hotel for a sum of 450,000 yen (3,000 USD), purportedly to cover the costs incurred in editing the footage to obscure the identities of passersby, except for individuals relevant to the case. This was done with the understanding that the video would be used exclusively in civil court proceedings. Itō said she tried but could not convince the hotel for the new permission in her film (Note: Nishihiro insists it has screened without approval, and Itō's side admits the approval is still wanting.)

However, Itō's side argues that the use of the hotel security camera footage in film should be justified for the following reasons:

- The footage used is not the exact material presented in court; instead, it has been digitally altered to modify elements such as the hotel interior and the shape of the taxi. (the movements showing Yamaguchi pulling Itō out of the taxi, carrying her, and dragging her—who was unable to walk on her own—to the hotel entrance remain unchanged).
- Only the footage from the morning after the incident was leaked during the trial process, subjecting Itō to intense defamation and harassment. However, the hotel took no action whatsoever.
- For Itō, this footage serves as the sole visual evidence of a non-consensual sexual assault.
- The decision to allow or deny the use of such footage currently rests solely with the hotel, but she argues that their film will enhance the discussion over the public interest of the footage in the case of sexual assault.
- The identity of the hotel where the alleged rape occurred was already public knowledge.

Miki Dezaki, a documentary filmmaker, argues it is baseless rhetoric to blame Itō for future rape victims. According to Dezaki, such rhetoric is harmful to survivors of sexual violence like Ms. Itō. Instead of condemning Ms. Itō, her former lawyers should call on hotels and businesses to make security camera footage related to crimes more accessible. Dezaki says, refusing to provide such footage constitutes an obstruction of justice.

Filmmaker Atsushi Funahashi and Chelsea Szendi Schieder criticized the lawyers and argued that not all of the ethics in journalism can be applied to documentaries, writing, "It is virtually impossible to obtain permission from everyone who appears in a documentary... Documentaries are full of unauthorized footage".

Hiroyoshi Sunakawa, a media scholar at Rikkyo University, argued, "There are some things, such as the degree of intoxication, that can only be conveyed through video. The film is made with purpose, and if its message serves the public interest—for instance, the prevention of sexual crimes—then the decision to show the footage, even without permission, can be justified."

Producer Eric Nyari said, "I believe in Shiori's right to tell her own story from her own point of view. In spite of the protests of her lawyer, she put it in the film. And as a production, we agree with that in terms of public interest, in terms of fairness, in terms of morality." He also said, "There are many examples of documentaries internationally that have used material without consent when it comes to shedding light on positions of power."

Film scholar Markus Nornes argues that Itō's film is "extraordinary and precious in many ways", and particularly criticized the unauthorized use of the cooperators of the investigation, the doorman and whistleblower A (aka Detective A), and suggests the source-protecting ethos does not live up to the standards of predecessors like other documentary film cases.

=== Detective A ===
Itō has stated that while she is personally grateful to Detective A, he is a member of the police that ultimately decided to halt the arrest at the last moment. As such, Itō says, he cannot be considered a neutral third party. For this reason, she decided to use the sound of his interview, without picture and altered voice.

Dezaki, while defending Itō's claims, states the following: "While there is always a risk that witnesses and whistleblowers may be exposed, I do not believe that Ms. Itō's film will have a significant impact on their decision. Rather, by seeing the courageous actions of the hotel staff, police officers, and taxi drivers who helped Ms. Itō, media and public voices may rise in praise of them, which could encourage more people to come forward as whistleblowers or witnesses."

=== Criticism against the lawyers ===
In response to criticisms made at a press conference by her former legal representatives, some journalists covering the case in Japan have pointed out that their statements may constitute a breach of confidentiality. Ito has filed a disciplinary complaint against these former representatives with the bar association, which has been accepted for review. Miki Dezaki also criticizes those representatives as they breached their duty of loyalty to Itō.

=== Article in the Tokyo Shimbun ===
Itō's side says, contrary to the Tokyo Shimbun article, the shooting of the women's gathering scene is authorized by the organizer. Following the complaint, the newspaper acknowledged that the wording was wrong, issued a correction, and apologized. Itō's side also says they obtained permission to film this scene, but they apologized and stated that the footage of anonymous participants who had lodged complaints would be modified. However, they affirmed that the permission of the female participant who spoke about sexual assault remained valid.

=== Filmmakers' criticism ===
Journalist Sōichirō Matsutani questioned Yang Yonghi and others who criticized Itō, pointing out the contradiction in Yang accusing Itō of violating privacy in the film while unilaterally disclosing her personal conversations with Itō on social media.
