= Flower Demo =

Japanese social movement

Flower Demo (Japanese: フラワーデモ, romanized: Furawādemo) is a Japanese social movement to protest sex crimes and sexual violence.

== History ==
In March 2019, criticism against several court rulings in Japan came after the defendants of rape and quasi-rape charges were acquitted. On social media, feminist activist and author Minori Kitahara called for action. Flower Demo's first events were held in Tokyo and Osaka Prefecture on 11 April 2019. Kitahara did not plan to create a movement at that time, but hundreds of people attended these events and asked to tell their stories, which prompted her to call for another event. Since then, the Flower Demo events have been held every month, mostly on the 11th. In about a year, the movement has spread across the country.

At the Flower Demo event, groups of sexual violence victims and their supporters gather in public spaces to "protest against unjust acquittals of sexual crimes and seek changes to the law." Holding flowers as a symbol of solidarity for victims, participants listen to victims speak about their experiences.

On 11 September 2019, journalist Shiori Itō attended one of the Flower Demo events in front of Tokyo Station and delivered a speech. There, she put on the same clothes that she had been wearing at the time she was raped, stating, "I want to raise awareness that regardless of what clothes a person wears, it doesn't mean they have given sexual consent."

On the International Women's Day of 8 March 2020, the Flower Demo events were held in 47 cities of 38 prefectures.
