= His Father's Son =

His Father's Son may refer to:

- His Father's Son (1917 film), a silent film drama
- His Father's Son (2024 film), a Canadian drama film
