= A Thousand Cuts (2024 film) =

- Directed by: Jake Horowitz
- Written by: Jake Horowitz
- Produced by: Jake Horowitz; Jason Spier
- Starring: Jonas Chernick; Storm Steenson; David Hewlett
- Cinematography: Paul D. Maxwell
- Edited by: Michael Pierro
- Production companies: Sideways Dog Productions; HYST Films
- Distributed by: Mongrel Media
- Release date: September 21, 2024 (Cinéfest)
- Running time: 91 minutes
- Country: Canada
- Language: English

A Thousand Cuts is a Canadian comedy mystery film, written and directed by Jake Horowitz and released in 2024. The film stars Jonas Chernick and Storm Steenson as Frasier and Roberta, the co-hosts of a live television special investigating the unsolved murder of horror novelist Bernard Balance 30 years earlier, only for unexpected new twists in the story to complicate the broadcast.

The cast also includes David Hewlett, Julian Richings, Varun Saranga, Tommie-Amber Pirie, Moracco Aurelius Latimore, Jarrod Clegg and Liam Marshall in supporting roles.

Steenson previously played Roberta in Horowitz's comedy television series Sunshine City.

The film premiered at the 2024 Cinéfest Sudbury International Film Festival. It was subsequently acquired for commercial distribution by Mongrel Media.
