= Dada (2024 film) =

2024 Canadian drama film

- Directed by: Aaron Poole
- Written by: Aaron Poole
- Produced by: Maddy Falle; Breanne Smordin
- Starring: James Gilbert; Ciara Alexys
- Cinematography: Matt Bendo
- Music by: Filius Blue
- Distributed by: Game Theory Films
- Release date: June 23, 2024 (FOFS)
- Country: Canada
- Language: English

Dada is a Canadian drama film, directed by Aaron Poole and released in 2024. Poole's feature directorial debut, the film stars James Gilbert and Ciara Alexys as Adam and Kai, a father and daughter who are driving around the perimeter of a nuclear power plant, interacting in seemingly trivial ways on the eve of Kai's 16th birthday.

The cast also includes Kimberly-Sue Murray, Josh Reich, Taya Messier, Joyce Cyr, Juney B. Poland, Rodney JR Wilcox, Stephanie Kast and Keith Bowser in supporting roles.

== Production ==
The film, described by Poole as "a love letter and a suicide note", was inspired in part by the Bruce Nuclear Generating Station, and its proximity to the seemingly serene natural environment of Lake Huron and Bruce County. Poole also stated of the film that "it was written in response to being a single father and scraping out a living in entertainment while living in a country with a history of violence and resource extraction.

It was shot on Manitoulin Island in 2022.

== Distribution ==
The film premiered as the closing film of the Future of Film Showcase in June 2024. It was also screened at the 2024 Cinéfest Sudbury International Film Festival.
