= The Conspiracy (2012 film) =

- Theatrical release poster
- Directed by: Christopher MacBride
- Written by: Christopher MacBride
- Produced by: Lee Kim
- Starring: Aaron Poole; James Gilbert
- Cinematography: Ian Anderson
- Edited by: Adam Locke-Norton; Christopher MacBride
- Music by: Darren Baker
- Production companies: Resolute Films and Entertainment
- Distributed by: XLRator
- Release date: September 20, 2012 (Fantastic Fest)
- Running time: 84 minutes
- Country: Canada
- Language: English

The Conspiracy is a 2012 Canadian found footage conspiracy thriller horror film written and directed by Christopher MacBride. It features actors Aaron Poole, James Gilbert, Alan C. Peterson, and Julian Richings. It tells the story of two documentary filmmakers who set out to create a film about a conspiracy theorist named "Terrance G" who disappears during the making of the film. The two filmmakers are subsequently drawn into the world of a global syndicate whose aims and machinations are clouded in secrecy.

== Plot ==
After watching an online video that mocks Terrance, a local conspiracy theorist, Canadian filmmakers Aaron and Jim decide to make a documentary about him. Terrance agrees to show them the newspaper clippings he has collected and uses to draw connections between significant historical events, including WWI and 9/11. Impressed with the depth of his research, Aaron begins to sympathize with Terrance, while Jim remains skeptical. During an interview, Terrance becomes agitated and points out a man whom he believes to be following him. Shortly afterward, Terrance disappears without a trace. Worried, Aaron and Jim return to his apartment, which is being cleared out. Aaron manages to salvage the newspaper clippings.

Further scrutiny of Terrance's material reveals that he had connected several significant historical events to the Tarsus Club, a NGO founded on an ancient secret society noted for the fact that its members tend to meet just before significant historical events, which has led conspiracy theorists to believe that the Tarsus Club is responsible for said events. The only evidence of its existence is a single article written in Time magazine by Mark Tucker. Unable to find further information about Tucker, Aaron, and Jim turn to the Internet and solicit information from the public. A man claiming to be Tucker contacts them and agrees to meet for an interview on the condition that Aaron and Jim remove from the Internet everything that they have written about the Tarsus Club. During the interview, Tucker explains that the Tarsus Club worships Mithras and is said to sacrifice a bull at each of its meetings.

As the filmmakers deepen their knowledge of the Tarsus Club, ominous signs emerge of a possible concerted stalking effort targeting them. When his house is broken into, Aaron moves in with Jim, his wife, and their young child, and their already divergent opinions about whether to continue the documentary lead to some friction. Tucker later contacts them with news that he can sneak them into the next meeting of the Tarsus Club, which will be held at a mansion in the woods in the USA.

Armed with hidden cameras, the pair document their interactions with members at the meeting. Claiming to be new members, Aaron and Jim are forced to participate in an outdoor initiation ritual in which they declare their allegiance to Mithras and are given raven masks to wear for the remainder of the meeting. While waiting in line for the ritual, Aaron sees Tucker enter the meeting and greet various Tarsus Club members. Realizing that Tucker is a member himself, Aaron becomes worried that Jim, who was before him in line, is in danger. However, he calms down when he sees Jim leaving the ritual wearing a raven mask, and Aaron decides to go through with the ritual himself. Back inside the mansion, a member corners Jim and reveals that the Tarsus Club has brought his wife and their young child to the meeting. At the same time, Aaron finishes the initiation ritual only to be given a bull mask instead of a raven mask. The members, armed with large daggers, then chase him through the woods. He manages to arrive at the meeting point he had arranged with Jim, only to discover him there, surrounded by Tarsus Club members. Although his hidden camera continues to record as the members catch Aaron and appear to attack him with their daggers, it does not show his ultimate fate.

It is then revealed to the audience that Aaron and Jim's footage up to this point has been edited and incorporated into a neutral, even positive, documentary about the Tarsus Club. It features brief interviews with members, including a woman who had appeared unnamed earlier in a seemingly sympathetic capacity, but is now revealed to be Club Senior VP, Nicole Higgins. She claims that the attack on Aaron was faked in order to scare him off, which is a usual practice with intruders into their meetings. Although visibly shaken, Jim seems cooperative, agreeing with this version of events, assisting members in editing the footage, and adding that Aaron was released unharmed. However, he states that Aaron was traumatized as a result and later disappeared. When asked by Nicole what his theory is about Aaron's whereabouts, a dewy-eyed Jim replies, "I guess he ended up in the same place Terrance did, didn't he?" in an inquisitive, yet knowing tone. The Tarsus Club COO then reassures the audience that its members are not engaged in any nefarious conspiracies, but rather that it simply seeks worldwide cooperation between "governments, businesses, and individuals."

== Cast ==
- Aaron Poole as Aaron
- James Gilbert as Jim
- Alan Peterson as Terrance
- Bruce Clayton as Mark Tucker
- Roy Swanson as Murray Chance
- Laura de Carteret as Nicole Higgins
- Julian Richings as Green Man
- Melanie Scrofano as Sarah

== Production ==
Writer and director Christopher MacBride said that a friend introduced him to conspiracy theories. According to him, "For several months I got lost down that rabbit hole and eventually a light bulb just went off and I realized there was a really compelling story to tell set in that world." The film makes use of both actors and real-life people involved in the conspiracy community. MacBride said that he sees the film as an evenhanded faux documentary, not as "found footage".

== Release ==
The Conspiracy premiered at the Fantastic Fest and was picked up by XLrator for distribution in the US. XLrator released on VOD on August 8, 2013, and in cinemas on August 23, 2013. It was released in the UK on October 11, 2013.

== Reception ==
Rotten Tomatoes, a review aggregator, reports that 88% of eight surveyed critics gave the film a positive review; the average rating was 6.5/10. Linda Barnard of the Toronto Star rated it 2/4 stars and called it "a tense but far-fetched thriller". Adam Nayman of The Globe and Mail rated it 4/5 stars and wrote that it "does more with a found-footage conceit than any horror movie since The Blair Witch Project." John Patterson of The Guardian called it "both plausible and watchable", though it "can be faulted for its predictability". Joe Leydon of Variety called it "a modestly suspenseful faux documentary" that turns silly near the climax. Peter Martin of Twitch Film wrote, "With absolute conviction and unwavering intelligence, The Conspiracy unpacks complex theories and raises disturbing questions that are not easily dismissed." Richard Whittaker of the Austin Chronicle wrote, "The Conspiracy succeeds, not just because it successfully mimics the post-Michael Moore generation of directors who love to put themselves in front of the camera. It succeeds because it mimics the fever-dream paranoia of conspiracy documentarians." Matt Glasby of Total Film rated it 4/5 stars and called it "plausible and chilling".

Brad McHargue of Dread Central rated it 5/5 stars and wrote, "The Conspiracy is one of the most original, creative, and genuinely frightening horror movies in recent memory." Brad Miska of Bloody Disgusting rated it 4/5 stars and wrote, "It’s unfortunate that the epilogue is so weak considering how fun, engaging and thought provoking the entire film is." Scott Weinberg of Fearnet wrote that it "works resoundingly well."

One reviewer, writing in The Lexander Magazine, accused the filmmakers of plagiarizing a 2006 film entitled The Brandon Corey Story, which featured British conspiracy theorist David Icke.
