= Krystin Pellerin =

Canadian actress

- Born: July 12, 1983 (age 43); St. John's, Newfoundland, Canada
- Occupation: Actress
- Height: 5 ft 4 in (163 cm)
- Spouse: Rylan Wilkie

Krystin Pellerin (born July 12, 1983) is a Canadian actress of theatre, television, and film.

== Early life ==
Pellerin was born and raised in St. John's, Newfoundland. After completing high school at Prince of Wales Collegiate and briefly attending Memorial University of Newfoundland, she was selected to attend the National Theatre School of Canada in Montreal, Quebec.

== Career ==
Following her graduation she was cast in her first season at Soulpepper Theatre in Toronto, Ontario. Her first professional play was Soulpepper's production of Tom Stoppard's The Real Thing, playing the role of Debbie opposite Megan Follows, Albert Schultz, and C. David Johnson. In it she played the rebellious daughter to Albert Schultz's Henry. She has returned to Soulpepper every season since, playing a variety of leading and supporting characters in numerous productions.

Her first film was Killing Zelda Sparks, in which she starred opposite Mad Men's Vincent Kartheiser, and in her second film she appeared opposite Edward Furlong in Warriors of Terra. She made her television debut on the second season of The Tudors as Lady Elizabeth Darrell alongside Jonathan Rhys Meyers, where she spent five months filming in Dublin, Ireland. Her first featured role in television brought her home to St. John's, playing the role of Sergeant Leslie Bennett in CBC Television's Republic of Doyle.

In 2023, she played Diana, Princess of Wales in a production of Nick Green's play Casey and Diana at the Stratford Festival.

== Filmography ==
Film and television
Year	Title	Role	Notes
2006	Warriors of Terra	Izzy	
2007	Killing Zelda Sparks	Ellen	
2008	The Tudors	Lady Elizabeth Darrell	4 episodes
2010	Lost Girl	Jenny	Episode: "Faetal Attraction"
2010-2014	Republic of Doyle	Leslie Bennett	Starring role Nominated – Gemini Award for Best Performance by an Actress in a Continuing Leading Dramatic Role
2013	The Listener	Kathy Slocum	
2015	Saving Hope	Elaine	Episode: Remains of the Day
2016	Reign	Anne Boleyn	Episode: To the Death
2017	Murdoch Mysteries	Virginia Swift	Episode The Talking Dead
