= Aaron Poole =

Canadian actor (b. 1977)

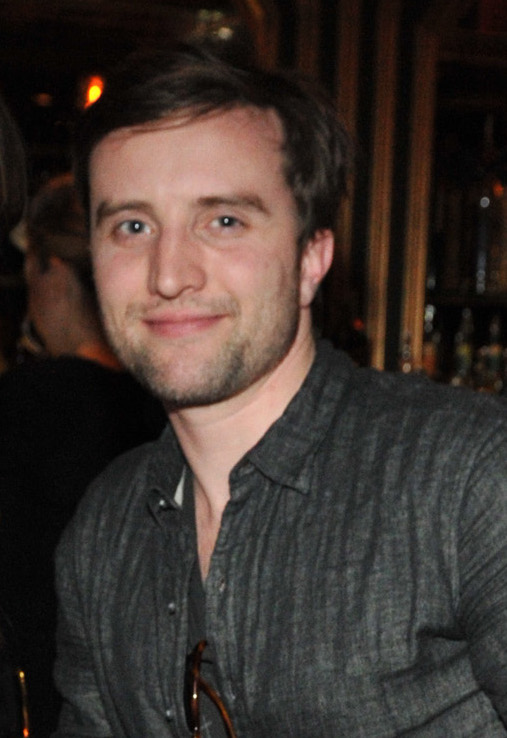
- Portrait of Aaron Poole
- Born: March 17, 1977 (age 49); Canada
- Occupations: Actor, writer, director, producer
- Years active: 1995-present

Aaron Poole (born March 17, 1977) is a Canadian actor.

== Early life ==
Poole grew up in Barrie, Ontario and attended Barrie Central Collegiate. He is a graduate of the Etobicoke School of the Arts and George Brown College. He is of Italian descent.

== Career ==
Poole's credits include the films Killing Zelda Sparks, Adoration and This Beautiful City, and the television series Strange Days at Blake Holsey High and ZOS: Zone of Separation. He was nominated for Best Actor at the 29th Genie Awards for his performance in This Beautiful City. Poole starred in Ed Gass-Donnelly's second feature film Small Town Murder Songs in 2010. He also appeared in the movie Fury.

Poole is an executive producer and one of the lead actors in The Conspiracy, a mockumentary thriller which opened at one location in Toronto on July 19, 2013, and is expected to hit other major cities in Canada a few weeks later, followed by some U.S. cities. Thereafter, he worked on a film called Forsaken with Donald and Kiefer Sutherland.

Dada, his feature film debut as a director, premiered at the 2024 Future of Film Showcase.

== Filmography ==
=== Film ===
Year	Title	Role	Notes
1998	All I Wanna Do	Beagle - Flat Critter	
2001	The Safety of Objects	Z-100 Judge	
2002	The Circle	Smitty Jacobson	
2006	The House	Duncan	
2007	Killing Zelda Sparks	Ryan Bladder	
2007	This Beautiful City	Johnny	
2008	Adoration	Daniel	
2010	Gangster Exchange	Big Dave	
2010	Small Town Murder Songs	Jim	
2012	The Samaritan	Jake	
2012	The Conspiracy	Aaron	
2012	Margo Lily	Rob	Short film
2012	The Last Will and Testament of Rosalind Leigh	Leon Leigh / Surveillance Expert	
2013	The Animal Project	Leo	
2013	Cas & Dylan	Steve	
2014	The Captive	Mike	
2014	Relative Happiness	Joss	
2015	No Stranger Than Love	Jamie Whyte	
2015	Forsaken	Frank Tillman	
2016	The Void	Daniel Carter	
2017	The Definites	Abe	
2017	The Scent of Rain and Lightning	Meryl Tapper	
2017	Mary Goes Round	Pete	
2019	Spiral	Liam	
2019	Disappearance at Clifton Hill	The One-Eyed Man	
2020	Tainted	Malick	
2020	Flashback	Pierced Man	
2020	Stardust	Mick Ronson	
2020	The Empty Man	Paul	
2022	The Young Arsonists	Dale	

=== Television ===
Year	Title	Role	Notes
1998	Blind Faith	White Kid #1	TV movie
2003–2004	Strange Days at Blake Holsey High	Grant Wheeler	3 episodes
2010–2011	Living in Your Car	Toby	9 episodes
2011	King	Jason Collier	8 episodes
2011	Flashpoint	Davis Lagosto	1 episode
2011–2014	Republic of Doyle	Chad King	2 episodes
2012–2013	Copper	Robert Cobb Kennedy	9 episodes
2013	The Listener	Jay Levinson	1 episode
2014–2015	Strange Empire	Captain John Slotter	13 episodes
2018	Murdoch Mysteries	Frank Lloyd Wright	1 episode
2019	Frankie Drake	Constable Crowley	1 episode: S3:E2
2021	The Communist's Daughter	Ian McDougald	8 episodes
2021	Faith Heist	Jack	TV movie
2026	Reacher	Springfield	6 episodes: S4

== Awards and nominations ==
Year	Award	Category	Work	Result	Ref.
2008	ACTRA Awards	Best Actor	This Beautiful City	Won	
2008	Genie Awards	Performance by an Actor in a Leading Role	This Beautiful City	Nominated	
2015	Maverick Movie Awards	Best Actor: Short	The Orchard	Nominated	
2016	Canadian Screen Awards	Best Performance by an Actor in a Continuing Leading Dramatic Role	Strange Empire	Nominated	
