= Killing Zelda Sparks =

2007 film directed by Jeff Glickman

- Directed by: Jeff Glickman
- Written by: Josh Ben Friedman (play and screenplay)
- Starring: Colm Feore; Sarah Carter; Vincent Kartheiser; Geoffrey Arend; Aaron Poole
- Distributed by: Warner Home Video; Lightyear Entertainment
- Release date: August 28, 2007 (Montréal World Film Festival)
- Running time: 95 minutes
- Countries: Canada; United States
- Language: English

Killing Zelda Sparks is a 2007 Canadian-American black comedy thriller film, shot in Copper Cliff, Sudbury, Ontario, Canada standing in for the town of New Essex. Post production was completed on January 24, 2007. The film stars Colm Feore, Sarah Carter, Vincent Kartheiser, and Geoffrey Arend. It is directed by Jeff Glickman and adapted for the screen by Josh Ben Friedman from his play Barstool Words.

The film was released on DVD on May 20, 2008.

== Plot ==
When Zelda Sparks comes back to the small town of New Essex, two old high school buddies pull a vicious prank on her for wronging them in the past. But they are shocked to learn that the prank may have turned deadly.

== Cast ==
- Vincent Kartheiser as Craig Blackshear
- Sarah Carter as Zelda Sparks
- Geoffrey Arend as Terry Seville
- Krystin Pellerin as Ellen
- Colm Feore as Dr. Theodore Lenningrad
- Aaron Poole as Ryan Bladder
- Bruce McFee as Jenkins
- Robin Brûlé as Jane
- Dillon Casey as Bill
- Gerry Quigley as Elvis
- Alec McClure as Cliff Sprockter
- Gordon Masten as Smitty

== Critical reception ==
David Walker of DVD Talk wrote "Killing Zelda Sparks is not a bad film, just a good film that tries too hard to be quirky and innovative, which comes at the expense of the story and the characters. The film is entertaining and engaging enough to capture your interest, but it has a tough time maintaining it."

David Nusair of Reel Film Reviews said "Killing Zelda Sparks is an effectively acted yet otherwise interminable piece of work that bears all the marks of filmmaker in over his head, as director Jeff Glickman has infused the proceedings with a number of progressively ostentatious cinematic tricks that are ultimately more of a distraction than anything else.
