= Liverpool (2012 film) =

- Directed by: Manon Briand
- Written by: Manon Briand
- Produced by: Roger Frappier; Sylvie Lacoste; Luc Vandal
- Starring: Stéphanie Lapointe; Charles-Alexandre Dubé
- Cinematography: Claudine Sauvé
- Edited by: Richard Comeau
- Music by: Ramachandra Borcar
- Production company: Max Films Productions
- Release date: August 2012
- Country: Canada

Liverpool is a 2012 Canadian comedy crime film. Written and directed by Manon Briand, the film stars Stéphanie Lapointe as Émilie, a coat check clerk at a Montreal nightclub who decides to return a coat left behind one night by a woman who took a drug overdose in the club, only to find herself embroiled in the city's criminal underground. Her only ally in the quest is Thomas (Charles-Alexandre Dubé), a regular customer of the club and a potential new love interest for Émilie.

Liverpool was Briand's first film since 2002's Chaos and Desire.
