= Neon Dreaming =

2024 Canadian drama film

- French: Rêver en néon
- Directed by: Marie-Claire Marcotte
- Written by: Marie-Claire Marcotte
- Based on: Flush by Marie-Claire Marcotte
- Produced by: Corey Loranger; Marie-Claire Marcotte
- Starring: Maélya Boyd; Corey Loranger; Geneviève Langlois; Caroline Raynaud; Maïna-Rose Caméus; Sheila Ingabire Isaro
- Cinematography: Brennan Full
- Edited by: Maria Todorov-Topouzov
- Music by: Kevin J. Black
- Production companies: Fittonia Films; Calibou Films
- Distributed by: Indiecan Entertainment (Canada); Attraction Distribution (worldwide)
- Release date: September 15, 2024 (Cinéfest Sudbury)
- Running time: 83 minutes
- Country: Canada
- Language: French

Neon Dreaming (French: Rêver en néon) is a Canadian drama film, directed by Marie-Claire Marcotte and released in 2024. An adaptation of her own theatrical play Flush, the film stars Maélya Boyd as Billie, a young girl using her vivid imagination to cope with the absence of her mother.

The cast also includes Corey Loranger, Geneviève Langlois, Maïna-Rose Caméus, Caroline Raynaud, Sheila Isaro, Pierre-André Muila, Hélène Dallaire, Grey Reich, Nicole Prefontaine, Baeyen Hoffman, Jasper Green, Émile Legault and Mike Skakoon in supporting roles.

== Production ==
The film received funding from Telefilm Canada in 2022. It went into production in winter 2024, shooting in the Chelmsford neighbourhood of Sudbury, Ontario.

== Release ==
The film premiered as a special presentation at the 2024 Cinéfest Sudbury International Film Festival in September 2024. It had its international premiere at Tallinn Black Nights Film Festival in November 2024.

== Awards ==
| Event | Date | Category | Recipient | Result |
|---|---|---|---|---|
| Montreal Independent Film Festival | October 14, 2024 | Best First-Time Filmmaker | Marie-Claire Marcotte | Won |
| Montreal Independent Film Festival | October 14, 2024 | Best Youth Artist | Maélya Boyd | Won |
| Tallinn Black Nights Film Festival | November 24, 2024 | Just Film Children's Jury Best Film | Neon Dreaming | Nominated |
| Rendez-vous Québec Cinéma | February 27, 2025 | Best Franco-Canadian Feature | Neon Dreaming | Nominated |
| Festival international du film pour enfants de Montréal | March 9, 2025 | Union des artistes Prize for Best Actress | Maélya Boyd | Won |
| Festival international du film pour enfants de Montréal | March 9, 2025 | Best Feature | Neon Dreaming | Nominated |
| Glasgow Film Festival | March 9, 2025 | Audience Award | Neon Dreaming | Nominated |
| RACCORD | March 23, 2025 | Prix Oeil du RACCORD | Marie-Claire Marcotte | Won |
| Festival du film Canadien de Dieppe | March 30, 2025 | Best Actress | Maélya Boyd | Won |
| Sunscreen Film Festival | April 27, 2025 | Best International Feature | Neon Dreaming | Nominated |
| Regina International Film Festival | August 23, 2025 | Best Canadian Feature | Neon Dreaming | Won |
| Canada International Children's Film Festival | August 24, 2025 | The Maple Leaf Award | Neon Dreaming | Won |
| Canada International Children's Film Festival | August 24, 2025 | Best Feature Film | Neon Dreaming | Nominated |
| Canada International Children's Film Festival | August 24, 2025 | Best Rising Star | Maélya Boyd | Nominated |
| Canada International Children's Film Festival | August 24, 2025 | Children's Jury Award | Neon Dreaming | Nominated |
| Canada International Children's Film Festival | August 24, 2025 | Parents' Jury Award | Neon Dreaming | Nominated |
| Oulu International Children's and Youth Film Festival | November 23, 2025 | Best Film (Children's Film Competition) | Neon Dreaming | Nominated |
| Olympia International Film Festival for Children and Young People | December 6, 2025 | Best Canadian Feature | Neon Dreaming | Nominated |
| Bulbul Children's International Film Festival | January 17, 2026 | Best Film | Neon Dreaming | Won |
