= Sunshine City (TV series) =

Canadian television series

Sunshine City is a Canadian comedy-mystery television series, which premiered in 2022 on Bell Fibe's TV1. The series stars Storm Steenson as Roberta Muffin, the host of a television travelogue series about Orillia, Ontario who is not who she claims to be.

The cast also includes Mark Pettit, Simone Jetsun, Jarrod Clegg, Liam Marshall, Helly Chester and Braden Barrie. It was created by Jake Horowitz and Andy Lewis, who previously produced and directed the 2020 comedy film Cup of Cheer.

The series entered production in fall 2021, and premiered on TV1 in May 2022. In July 2022, TV1 announced that it had renewed the series for a second season.

In 2024, Steenson reprised the role of Roberta in Horowitz's film A Thousand Cuts.
