= Drive Back Home =

- Directed by: Michael Clowater
- Written by: Michael Clowater
- Produced by: William Woods; Brian Mason; Maddy Falle
- Starring: Charlie Creed-Miles; Alan Cumming; Clare Coulter
- Cinematography: Stuart Campbell
- Edited by: Mikaela Bodin
- Production companies: Woods Entertainment; Mason Films
- Distributed by: Game Theory Films
- Release date: September 19, 2024 (Cinéfest)
- Running time: 100 minutes
- Country: Canada
- Language: English

Drive Back Home is a 2024 Canadian drama film, written and directed by Michael Clowater. Set in 1970, the film stars Charlie Creed-Miles as Weldon, a blue-collar plumber from New Brunswick who has been forced to travel to Toronto to bail his estranged brother Perley (Alan Cumming) out of jail following his arrest for having sex with another man in a public park, and centres on their road trip back to New Brunswick.

The cast also includes Clare Coulter, Sprague Grayden, Gray Powell, Judah Davidson, Guy Sprung, Alexandre Bourgeois, Anthony Jones Nestoras, Gord Rand, Brian Bisson, Thomas Mitchell, Jennifer Carroll, Deborah Tennant, Dan Beirne, David Assinewai, Jayden Kirton, Joe Drinkwalter, Cameron Nicoll and Jude Zappala in supporting roles.

== Production ==
The film was based on the true story of Clowater's grandfather Ernie and great-uncle Hedley, with coverage of the film noting that it was a common tactic of police in the era to deal with arrests of gay men by having a family member come pick the person up in lieu of jail time, thus effectively outing the gay man to their families involuntarily.

Although a first-time film director, Clowater was able to leverage his established international connections as a director of television advertising to secure the casting of Cumming and Creed-Miles in the lead roles.

Production on the film began in winter 2023 in North Bay, Ontario.

== Distribution ==
The film premiered at the 2024 Cinéfest Sudbury International Film Festival.

It was subsequently screened at the 2024 Calgary International Film Festival, where it won the audience award for Canadian narrative features.
