= List of Republic of Doyle episodes =

Republic of Doyle is a Canadian comedy-drama television series set in St. John's, Newfoundland and Labrador, which originally aired on CBC Television. It premiered on January 6, 2010 and ended on December 10, 2014, with a total of 77 episodes over the course of 6 seasons.

== Series overview ==
Season	Episodes	Originally released	
Season	Episodes	First released	Last released
1	12	January 6, 2010	April 7, 2010
2	13	January 12, 2011	April 6, 2011
3	13	January 11, 2012	April 4, 2012
4	13	January 6, 2013	April 21, 2013
5	16	October 2, 2013	February 5, 2014
6	10	October 15, 2014	December 10, 2014

== Episodes ==
=== Season 1 (2010) ===
No. overall	No. in season	Title	Directed by	Written by	Original release date	Prod. code	CAN viewers (millions)
1	1	"Fathers and Sons"	Mike Clattenburg	Allan Hawco, Perry Chafe and Malcolm MacRury	January 6, 2010	101	0.969
The Doyles' help a close family friend beat a manslaughter charge despite the fact that he refuses to defend himself. Jake’s relationship with his ex-wife, Nikki, is heating up when it should be cooling down—and Leslie might be the perfect distraction. Guest star: Shaun Majumder (Benny Natchie).
2	2	"The Return of the Grievous Angel"	Steve DiMarco	Allan Hawco and Avrum Jacobson	January 13, 2010	102	0.715
A young woman comes to the Doyles with one case—to find her unknown biological father—but they end up solving three; Jake is distracted by Leslie while trying to extract himself from Nikki. Guest star: Rob Stewart.
3	3	"Duchess of George"	Mike Clattenburg	Allan Hawco, Perry Chafe and Malcolm MacRury	January 20, 2010	103	0.685
The Doyles take on a cold arson case for Mal's old flame to find out the tragic truth of what really happened when a girl died in a bar fire; Jake and Leslie are finally starting to connect when Jake discovers he might be... a daddy? Guest stars: Mary Walsh (Miranda Cahill), Robert Joy (Al Kavanaugh), Greg Malone (Finn).
4	4	"Blood is Thicker Than Blood"	Steve DiMarco	Allan Hawco, Perry Chafe, Denis McGrath and Malcolm MacRury	January 27, 2010	104	0.705
A wrongfully convicted murderer gets out of prison and offers the Doyles a generous payday if they find the real killer; Jake finds out the truth about Nikki’s pregnancy. Guest stars: Sebastian Spence (Bobby Maher), Shawn Doyle (Carl Maher).
5	5	"Hit and Rum"	Steve DiMarco	Matt MacLennan	February 3, 2010	105	0.594
The Doyles start trailing a potentially cheating husband to find he deeply loves his wife but is in deep trouble with some menacing criminals and smugglers; as Nikki moves forward with her new beau, Jake and Leslie take it to the next level. Guest stars: Gordon Pinsent (Maurice Becker), Mark Critch (Ned Bishop).
6	6	"The One Who Got Away"	Larry McLean	Jesse McKeown	February 10, 2010	106	1.012
The Doyles show their sentimental side as they help Jake’s high school girlfriend Stacey Layden (Joanne Kelly) run off into the sunset with her new husband, who’s running from both bad guys and good guys to just get away; Rose’s past comes back to haunt her in the form of her ex-con husband Martin Poole (Nicholas Campbell), while Leslie weighs whether or not she wants Jake in her future.
7	7	"The Woman Who Knew Too Little"	Robert Lieberman	Jeremy Boxen	March 3, 2010	107	1.053
Jake sets out to find the true identity of a beautiful amnesiac who stumbles across his path and ends up fighting off her two stalkers; Martin Poole refuses to leave town and wreaks havoc in Rose and Mal’s relationship; and Leslie gives Jake the cold shoulder. Guest star: Kathleen Munroe (Jane Doe / Annabelle).
8	8	"The Tell-Tale Safe"	Jerry Ciccoritti	John Callaghan and Steve Cochrane	March 10, 2010	108	0.986
A grieving widow hires the Doyles to find out why her husband left a generous sum of money in his will to a woman she’s never heard of. Rose continues to battle with Martin over their divorce while Mal formulates a plan to get Poole out of their lives for good; and Leslie and Jake hit a comfortable stride as friends and colleagues—just as his divorce from Nikki becomes final. Guest stars: Cathy Jones (Janet Chafe), R.H. Thomson (Francis Chafe).
9	9	"He Sleeps with the Chips"	Phil Earnshaw	Perry Chafe	March 17, 2010	109	0.908
When a dubious chip truck owner notices his truck is missing—along with his driver/best buddy—he cons Jake into taking the case; Martin really crosses a line with Rose and she takes matters into her own hands; and Jake’s divorce becomes final and he’s happy to tell Leslie that he’s now a free-agent. But Leslie’s just been bumped up the ladder with a promotion to Sergeant, and her eye is on the job, not Jake Doyle.
10	10	"The Pen is Mightier Than the Doyle"	Robert Lieberman	Steve Cochrane and Avrum Jacobson	March 24, 2010	110	0.897
When Mal suddenly leaves town and lends Jake out to be shadowed by a pompous crime novelist looking for inspiration, Jake’s entire life, including his constant relationship woes, is put under the authorial microscope; a simple cheating spouse domestic case turns out to be something far more devious than it first appears; and Jake, expecting the return of his father, gets an unwelcome surprise when it’s not Mal standing in the kitchen to greet him but his troubled older brother, Christian. Guest star: Victor Garber (Garrison Steele).
11	11	"A Horse Divided"	Steve Scaini	Jesse McKeown	March 31, 2010	111	0.902
Jake and Mal are pulled into a family favour case when Walter’s soon-to-be brother-in-law suddenly disappears on the day of his wedding; Leslie meets Christian for the first time and he certainly leaves an impression on her; and the tension between Jake and Christian escalates to a new level after Christian crosses one too many lines with his younger brother.
12	12	"The Fall of the Republic"	Robert Lieberman	Steve Cochrane and Jesse McKeown	April 7, 2010	112	1.120
When Jake receives a mysterious late night call from Christian, he’s not prepared for the scary crime scene he finds at the other end of the line; Mal is suddenly and seriously sidelined and Jake takes the reins to save his tormented brother from the Police, including Leslie; Nikki makes a significant step in moving on from Jake; and everyone’s trying to keep it together as their Republic falls apart. Guest star: Seamus O'Regan (Paddy the Bartender).

=== Season 2 (2011) ===
No. overall	No. in season	Title	Directed by	Written by	Original release date	Prod. code	CAN viewers (millions)
13	1	"Live and Let Doyle"	James Allodi	Allan Hawco	January 12, 2011	201	1.038
In the season 2 opener, Jake is on the trail of a group of bold daytime kidnappers; Leslie and Jake take steps to move on from each other as Rose tries to figure out the next steps after Mal's heart attack.
14	2	"Popeye Doyle"	Steve Scaini	Allan Hawco	January 19, 2011	202	0.944
Jake plays prisoner when he goes "inside" to find out the location of some stolen diamonds from a gang of incarcerated criminals; Mal finds out that Rose has been keeping a big secret from him; Tinny's money-making scheme starts to take root. Guest stars: Gordon Pinsent (Maurice Becker), Alan Doyle (Wolf Redmond), Mayko Nguyen (Dr. Annie Price), Aidan Devine (Hal Gushue).
15	3	"A Stand Up Guy"	Steve Scaini	Perry Chafe	January 26, 2011	203	0.776
The Doyles are employed to help a comedian on the edge of a comeback find a dangerous stalker; Leslie defines the boundaries for the men in her life, including Jake; Allison reveals something to Jake that could be a game-changer. Guest stars: Don McKellar.
16	4	"The Son Also Rises"	Steve DiMarco	Jesse McKeown	February 2, 2011	204	0.899
It gets personal when the Doyles band together to protect someone they love from the cops and from a killer; Tinny gets in a little further with her new hobby and her new friends.
17	5	"Something Old, Someone Blue"	James Allodi	Adam Higgs & Jackie May	February 9, 2011	205	0.854
It's matrimony—Doyle style—as Jake and Mal are tasked with finding the person responsible for sabotaging an upcoming wedding; Mal and Rose fix a bump in the road in their relationship as Jake and Allison hit a stride in theirs; Des comes to Tinny's rescue but ends up exploding her plans in the process.
18	6	"The Ryans and the Pittmans"	Steve DiMarco	Greg Nelson	February 16, 2011	206	0.843
When an old Doyle family friend accidentally goes missing at sea, the Doyles are hired by his daughter to find out what really happened; Jake is forced to bail out Christian and picks up another line of business and a pile of new debt.
19	7	"Crashing on the Couch"	Keith Samples	Jackie May	February 23, 2011	207	0.760
Jake and Mal are called to check into some death threats that have been made to a respected psychiatrist; an old "friend" from the past shows up and makes an interesting proposition to the Doyles; after Leslie's close call, Jake and Leslie find themselves struggling a little in their new romantic relationships.
20	8	"Sympathy for the Devil"	Stacey Curtis	John Callaghan	March 2, 2011	208	0.834,400
The Doyles reluctantly take on a case from dodgy Martin Poole when he promises them a big payday; Jake and Allison encounter friction when their professional lives impose on their personal relationship; Jake gets an interesting job offer from an unlikely source. Guest stars: Nicholas Campbell (Martin Poole), Greg Malone (Finn).
21	9	"Will the Real Des Courtney Please Stand Up?"	Keith Samples	Greg Nelson	March 9, 2011	209	1.026
When Des finds himself in a very bizarre and compromising position, the Doyle clan works overtime to get him off the hook; Jake meets someone who has been complicating Allison's life; Tinny and Des start coming to terms with their feelings for each other.
22	10	"The Special Detective"	Steve Scaini	Adam Higgs	March 16, 2011	210	0.836
Crime novelist Garrison Steele returns again to both hire and torment Jake to help him research a murder case; Jake and Leslie struggle to keep their mutual affection for each other in check; Allison receives some much-needed help from Jake. Guest star: Victor Garber (Garrison Steele).
23	11	"Don't Gamble with City Hall"	John Vatcher	Jackie May	March 23, 2011	211	1.021
Jake buys an expensive gift for Allison only to have it stolen by a thief; The Mayor finds himself in a compromising position and asks for Jake's help and his silence; Mal has trouble telling a lie to his kids; Leslie thinks she's being followed.
24	12	"St. John's Town"	Keith Samples	Perry Chafe	March 30, 2011	212	0.730
The Doyles are hired by a real estate agent to investigate a series of strange occurrences at the site of her controversial housing development; Leslie uncovers some suspicious facts about the Mayor; the tension between Jake and the Mayor hits a high point; Allison makes Jake a serious proposition.
25	13	"Family Business"	Steve Scaini	Allan Hawco	April 6, 2011	213	1.265
When Tinny and Des are snatched from the safety of the Doyle home in broad daylight, Jake is forced to confront a dangerous man from his past (Paul Gross) to get them back; Leslie loses something else very precious to her; Jake makes a decision about his future with Allison.

=== Season 3 (2012) ===
No. overall	No. in season	Title	Directed by	Written by	Original release date	Prod. code	CAN viewers (millions)
26	1	"Streets of St. John's"	Keith Samples	Allan Hawco & Perry Chafe	January 11, 2012	301	1.361
Sergeant Jake Doyle is assigned to protect a mob informant but when a mysterious group of men impede him, Jake finds the tables turned—himself the target of a manhunt. Guest stars: Russell Crowe, Scott Grimes, Kevin Durand, Alan Doyle.
27	2	"Head Over Heels"	Keith Samples	John Callaghan	January 18, 2012	302	1.179
Jake and Mal investigate a hit-and-run and encounter a slippery criminal couple; Rose has a run-in with familiar ghosts from her past; Des discovers that Tinny's trip to London didn't go as expected. Guest star: Shannon Tweed.
28	3	"Hot Package"	Steve Scaini	Jackie May	January 25, 2012	303	1,047
The Doyles are hired to recover a missing item belonging to a beautiful client; Nikki asks Jake a favour he wants nothing to do with; Tinny enlists Des in keeping a secret. Guest star: Mark Critch.
29	4	"Rusted Steele"	Steve Scaini	Adam Higgs	February 1, 2012	304	1.156
Novelist Garrison Steele returns, hiring the Doyles to track down the love of his life. On the homefront, the Doyles get a new houseguest who's not planning on leaving any time soon. Jake dodges his ex-wife Nikki while wooing his ex-girlfriend Leslie—who'll have none of it. Guest star: Victor Garber.
30	5	"Dead Man Talking"	John Vatcher	Perry Chafe	February 8, 2012	305	1.019
It's a trip down memory lane as the Doyles investigate the murder of an old client. But when the body count rises, Jake starts to question the whole case. Rose gets in hot water with the police and Des's budding romance with med student Chandra begins to rub Tinny the wrong way. Guest star: Shawn Doyle.
31	6	"The Dating Game"	Stacey Curtis	Jackie May	February 15, 2012	306	1.075
Jake and Leslie find themselves trapped while trying to stop a robbery in progress; When Mal discovers his son is missing, he and Des try to locate Jake before it's too late; Rose helps newly-returned Doyle daughter, Kathleen, with a problem from her past.
32	7	"High School Confidential"	Gail Harvey	Allan Hawco	February 22, 2012	307	1.003
Jake Doyle is forced to help his high school nemesis track down missing money and win back the heart of his estranged wife; Des must decide between Chandra and Tinny once and for all; Rose and Kathleen take a step forward in their friendship.
33	8	"Two Jakes and a Baby"	Stacey Curtis	John Callighan	February 29, 2012	308	1.164
Stuck in Her Majesty's Penitentiary, Jake's only chance of freedom lies in the capture of a wanted kidnapper; Mal and Rose investigate a case that hits close to home; Walter helps Kathleen with a parenting issue.
34	9	"Mirror, Mirror"	Steve Scaini	Adam Higgs	March 7, 2012	309	1.066
With the infamous Maurice Becker back in town, Jake Doyle must get to the bottom of Maurice's fabrications before he disappears again; a Quebec cop makes Leslie think twice about her single status; Des attempts to rebound after his break-up with Chandra. Guest star: Gordon Pinsent.
35	10	"One Angry Jake"	John Vatcher	Jackie May and Kerri MacDonald	March 14, 2012	310	1.044
As one member of a biased jury, Jake struggles to exonerate an innocent woman; Des uses his skills to assist Jake's investigation on the outside; A decision from Kathleen’s past puts the Doyles in danger.
36	11	"Live Wire"	Keith Samples	Perry Chafe	March 21, 2012	311	1.042
When Des's dad is kidnapped after being released from jail, the Doyles must band together and save Jody Redmond before it's too late; Mal is distracted when he gets bad news about his old partner; Kathleen angers Tinny when she chooses an issue from the past over a case from the present.
37	12	"Con, Steal, Love"	Steve Scaini	John Callighan, Allan Hawco and Adam Higgs	March 28, 2012	312	0.930
Jake is hired to retrieve a priceless violin from a familiar con artist; Mal continues to dig into the death of his former partner; Kathleen is roped into another of George’s schemes.
38	13	"Under Pressure"	Keith Samples	Allan Hawco	April 4, 2012	313	0.968
The Doyles struggle to prove Mal's innocence when he's accused of murder, but end up digging a deeper hole; Kathleen gets some brotherly help with the George situation; Tinny discovers the identity of her father.

=== Season 4 (2013) ===
No. overall	No. in season	Title	Directed by	Written by	Original release date	Prod. code	CAN viewers (millions)
39	1	"From Dublin with Love"	Steve Scaini	Allan Hawco	January 6, 2013	401	0.802
Extended family from Dublin make an unannounced visit and bring some serious trouble with them.
40	2	"Blood Work"	John Vatcher	John Callaghan	January 13, 2013	402	0.720
Jake and Mal are given no choice but to help an escaped convict prove his innocence, and they get a glimpse of the drug trade in the city in the bargain; Tinny's curiosity about her father grows; Jake finds out why Leslie's been off the radar. Guest stars: Erin Karpluk, Joris Jarsky, Joel Thomas Hynes, Avery Ash, Gordon Miller.
41	3	"Identity Crisis"	Brad Peyton	Adam Higgs	January 20, 2013	403	N/A
Jake and Mal are hired by a man to find his wife, who he claims is alive and well despite being reported dead for years; Tinny takes her investigation into Crocker a step further; Leslie embraces Jake as a confidante. Guest stars: Paul Gross, Joel Thomas Hynes, Sean Baek, Sonya Salomaa, Grant Nickalls, Conrad Coates, Kristen Gutoskie.
42	4	"Carlotta's Way"	Kerri MacDonald	Steve Scaini	January 27, 2013	404	N/A
After a ransom drop goes bad, Jake and Mal fight against the clock and an unpredictable man to find the location of a kidnapped girl; Tinny shares some shocking news; Leslie slips deeper into her risky assignment. Guest stars: Paul Gross, Joel Thomas Hynes, Noam Jenkins, Lina Roessler, Christopher Bolton, Robert Joy, Steve Boyle, Rachel May Power.
43	5	"The Heroine"	David Frazee	Jesse McKeown	February 10, 2013	405	N/A
Jake's worst fears are realized upon discovery that Leslie has gone missing while working her dangerous undercover assignment, and now he's determined to find her at all costs. Meanwhile, an unlikely and suspicious client enlists Des's PI services. Guest stars: Robert Joy, Max Martini, Joel Thomas Hynes.
44	6	"The Common Wealth"	John Vatcher	Perry Chafe	February 17, 2013	406	N/A
The Doyles are hot on the trail of an international art thief; Constable Hayward makes a grave mistake with career-impacting implications; Leslie struggles as she deals with an important family issue. Guest Stars: Scott Grimes, Alan Doyle, Roark Critchlow, Romina D'Ugo, Aleks Paunovic.
45	7	"In Brigus"	Gail Harvey	Rob Blackie & Perry Chafe	February 24, 2013	407	N/A
Jake rushes to Leslie's side when the death of her father takes them to her hometown of Brigus, where a time of mourning turns into a full-fledged Doyle-style investigation when the death is ruled suspicious; Crocker formulates a plot to keep from being transferred to Vancouver. Guest stars: Paul Gross, Richard Donat, Maria Dinn, Geordie Johnson, James Gilbert.
46	8	"Multitasking"	Charles Binamé	Adam Higgs	March 24, 2013	408	N/A
Jake finds himself juggling multiple cases while looking into attempts made on the life of his ex-girlfriend; Tinny's relationship with her Uncle Jake is becoming strained due to her budding relationship with her father. Guest stars: Michelle Nolden, Kristen Gutoskie, Genelle Williams, Shane Daly.
47	9	"Retribution"	Brad Peyton	Allan Hawco & Bonnie Fairweather	March 31, 2013	409	N/A
When Jake is kidnapped and nearly burned alive, he escapes and teams up with Mal to track down his would-be killers and make sense of the whispers that a mysterious "boss" is behind the plot; Monica builds a case against Jake and ropes Tinny into it. Guests: Gordon Pinsent, Dov Tiefenbach, Hannah Anderson, Dax Ravina, John Cleland.
48	10	"Gimme Shelter"	Yon Motskin	John Callaghan	April 7, 2013	410	N/A
Mal and Rose try to keep an old friend safe and find out what kind of business he’s really into. Jake is laid up with a bad injury and his medication causes some strange dreams. Guests stars: Gordon Pinsent, Michelle Nolden, Rachel Wilson, Michael Hogan, Dylan Scott Smith, Amy Sloan.
49	11	"The Devil Inside"	Brad Peyton	John Callaghan	April 14, 2013	411	N/A
When a crazed bomber takes over the police station, it's up to Jake to try and defuse the situation from the inside before the hostage crisis can turn fatal; Trapped outside, Leslie leads the RNC command post with Jake's life hanging in the balance. Guest stars: Luis Guzman, Cristina Rosato.
50	12	"Return of the Kingpin"	Stephen Scaini	Adam Higgs	April 21, 2013	412	N/A
The city is thrown into chaos when a prison break floods the streets with escaped cons, and a threat against Tinny makes it extremely personal for Jake; Unfazed by the warnings from her uncle and grandfather, Tinny oversees a police transport of seized guns and drugs. Guest stars: Gordon Pinsent, Paul Gross, Joel Thomas Hynes, Jonathan Keltz, Yannah McIntosh.
51	13	"What Doesn't Kill You"	Stephen Scaini	Alan Hawco & Perry Chafe	April 21, 2013	413	N/A
With Tinny abducted at gunpoint by Maurice Becker, Jake and Crocker have no choice but to work together to get her back. While being held captive, Tinny attempts to get into Becker's head. Guest stars: Gordon Pinsent, Paul Gross, Joel Thomas Hynes, Jonathan Keltz, Yanna McIntosh, Carlos Diaz.

=== Season 5 (2013–14) ===
No. overall	No. in season	Title	Directed by	Written by	Original release date	Prod. code	CAN viewers (millions)
52	1	"Bon Cop, Bueno Cop"	Brad Peyton	Allan Hawco	October 2, 2013	501	0.638
In the explosive season premiere, the worried Doyles and Leslie finally find out where Jake has been during his two-month disappearance—but he’s brought some trouble back with him, including a rival for his affections. Tinny risks overstepping her professional bounds to help out her family. Des resolves to move on from Tinny. A stranger with a keen interest in Leslie comes to town. Guest stars: Emmanuelle Vaugier, Raoul Trujillo, Steve Bacic, Mark Critch, Ryan Robbins, Jonathan Keltz, Carlos Diaz.
53	2	"The Overpass"	John Vatcher	Perry Chafe	October 9, 2013	502	N/A
Jake meets his match in wily bail-jumper Stanley Westcott (Stuart Margolin), who will do anything to stop Jake from delivering him to the authorities back in St. John’s. The task is made even more difficult when old nemesis, biker, Big Charlie Archer (Max Martini) and an ambitious cop, Tobey Quinton (Peter Mooney) interfere. Tinny finds she can’t quite stay out of trouble, even while suspended. Mal and Rose keep tabs on a Crown Prosecutor, Maria House (Jennifer Podemski) who they discover to their own personal detriment, might not be on the up and up. Des receives praise from an unexpected source.
54	3	"Firecracker"	Helen Shaver	Adam Higgs	October 16, 2013	503	N/A
Jake and Mal have to keep up with Sloan Daniels (Lola Tash), a mysterious girl with an eye for trouble... and Jake’s GTO. Des feels a deep connection to the case which awakens painful memories for him. Guest stars: Lola Tash, Steve Bacic, Mark Critch, Jonathan Keltz, Brett Donahue, Seamus Morrison, Neil Crone.
55	4	"Gun for Hire"	David Frazee	Bonnie Fairweather	October 23, 2013	504	N/A
Troublemaker Martin Poole (Nicholas Campbell) comes back and Jake and Mal have no choice but to contend with a determined hitman when a man’s life is on the line. Tinny makes a big decision about her personal life. Leslie is put in the line of fire in Jake’s case—and is shocked to see it involves Callum Pardy (Ryan Robbins), someone she hasn’t seen for a long time. Des keep tabs on a suspicious businesswoman, Elaine Goodwin (Claire Rankin) visiting the city. Jake has a proposition for Leslie—but is met with some shocking news.
56	5	"The Works"	Steve Scaini	Perry Chafe	October 30, 2013	505	N/A
Eccentric novelist Garrison Steele (Victor Garber) returns and pulls the Doyles into an unusual murder investigation which resembles one of his novels. Tinny moves on from Grayson but must deal with the fallout from both Grayson and Des. Jake zeroes in on a new enemy. Leslie tries to come to terms with the sudden change in her life.
57	6	"Missing"	Charles Binamé	Allan Hawco & Corey Shurge	November 13, 2013	506	N/A
A memory-addled Jake must fill in the blanks from the night before when Sloan goes missing and her worried aunt, Patti (Serinda Swan) seeks his help. Mal and Des get tangled up with dangerous thug as Des avoids an awkward confrontation with Tinny. Jake and Leslie come to a crossroads in their relationship and finally make a decision regarding their future.
58	7	"Hook, Line and Sinker"	Steve Scaini	Bonnie Fairweather	November 20, 2013	507	N/A
Jake takes a fishing trip with Mal and Des and uncovers a murder mystery in the woods; Rose runs into notorious frenemy Frances LeMont (Shannon Tweed); Sloan pokes her nose in a case she shouldn't; Des keeps a secret from the Doyles.
59	8	"Young Guns"	Dawn Wilkinson	Adam Higgs	November 27, 2013	508	N/A
Jake is taken hostage and must investigate from inside an unusual, high-stakes robbery; a trapped Mal risks his safety to help Leslie; Sloan's secretive behaviour has Rose and Des alert.
60	9	"Major Crimes"	Steve Scaini	Allan Hawco & Perry Chafe	December 4, 2013	509	N/A
Leslie joins forces with Callum after her informant is murdered; Jake gets involved in Callum's business; Tinny's constable skills are tested on a big case.
61	10	"Brothers in Arms"	Paul Fox	Perry Chafe & Marcus Robinson	December 11, 2013	510	N/A
Jake crosses paths with a familiar hot headed cop, Jimmy O'Rourke while chasing a super hacker; Mal and Rose negotiate their way to a windfall; Des becomes apprenticed to a slick new Master.
62	11	"Frame Job"	Jim Donovan	Adam Higgs	January 8, 2014	511	N/A
Jake pursues a missing painting and a convicted art thief out for revenge, the Doyles are on edge after a brutal attack on one of their own. Sloan struggles to find her place in the family.
63	12	"Sleight of Hand"	Rob Blackie	Kerri MacDonald	January 15, 2014	512	N/A
Jake must release himself from a debt to a Montreal mob boss by locating a clever hustler. Leslie becomes suspicious of a fellow officer's motives. Jake is rattled by a visit from his exwife. Guest Stars: Rachel Wilson, Steve Bacic, Lothaire Bluteau, J Adam Brown, Oluniké Adeliyi, Paul Fauteux. NOTE: On the 1st of July 2021, this episode will be the final program to air on Fox before it ceases operations at 6am. Its content will still be available on Disney+.
64	13	"Welcome Back Crocker"	Cal Coons	Allan Hawco	January 22, 2014	513	N/A
Jake is forced to team up with his fugitive former partner Kevin Crocker (Paul Gross) who's determined to clear his name; Leslie must step up when a colleague is attacked; Des wrestles over telling Jake an important secret.
65	14	"If the Shoe Fits"	Steve Scaini	Adam Higgs	January 29, 2014	514	N/A
Jake crosses paths with cop Bill Murdoch (Yannick Bisson) on a strange case, but Jake's not sure he is telling the truth.
66	15	"Expansion"	John Vatcher	Perry Chafe	February 5, 2014	515	N/A
Former mayor William Cadigan Clarke is out of prison and is collecting on the debts owed by those whom he didn't disclose the participation of in his massive kick-back scheme and is also publicly taunting both Leslie and Jake.
67	16	"Buried"	John Vatcher	Allan Hawco	February 5, 2014	516	N/A
Jake is arrested for murder. While being transported to Her Majesty's Jake is abducted by Leslie's captors and sent on various errands with the promise that they will tell him where she is.

=== Season 6 (2014) ===
On April 4, 2014, CBC renewed Republic of Doyle for a sixth and final season.

No. overall	No. in season	Title	Directed by	Written by	Original release date	Prod. code	CAN viewers (millions)
68	1	"Dirty Deeds"	Allan Hawco	Allan Hawco	October 15, 2014	601	0.599
Jake must fight off his enemies while trying to solve a case for a hapless inmate as he struggles to come to terms with what happened to Leslie. The Doyles adjust to life after Jake’s daughter stole their life savings.
69	2	"No Rest for the Convicted"	Mark O'Brien	Perry Chafe	October 22, 2014	602	0.590
Jake must keep his loose-cannon bail benefactor in check while chasing a dodgy money trail; Leslie returns to work but with some conditions; Sloan's decisions force Jake into making a deal with the devil.
70	3	"Smash Derby"	Rob Blackie	Joseph Kay	October 29, 2014	603	0.446
An insurance case involving the temperamental victim of a car collision leads to intrigue at the track; Leslie resists meeting with the force therapist; Mal and Jake keep a big secret from Rose.
71	4	"The Driver"	Steve Scaini	Marcus Robinson	November 5, 2014	604	0.579
Jake teams up with an enigmatic and dangerous woman to track down a missing driver before a crime war breaks out; Leslie extends her help to Jake and the Doyles despite not being cleared by her therapist; Mal and Des hit rock bottom with repo work.
72	5	"True Lies"	Deanne Foley	Kerri MacDonald	November 12, 2014	605	N/A
Jake tracks down evidence to prove his innocence while being tracked down by a high school enemy turned Parole Officer; Leslie makes job-compromising decisions in a search for the truth; Mal and Rose question the return of prodigal Doyle; Christian.
73	6	"The Pint"	Steve Scaini	Perry Chafe & Allan Hawco	November 19, 2014	606	N/A
Jake has to solve a baffling case that has literally been dropped off at his front door; Ned Bishop (Mark Critch) is acting stranger than usual which jeopardizes an important day for Christian Doyle (Jonathan Goad), Leslie faces pressure from a new source as her past actions come back to haunt her.
74	7	"When the Whistle Blows"	Eleanore Lindo	Joseph Kay	November 26, 2014	607	N/A
When a tense strike at the docks turns violent, the Doyles team up with Jimmy (Scott Grimes) and Wolf (Alan Doyle) to protect a witness but uncover something more sinister in the process; Jake faces off with Saul again to dangerous results; Rose encounters a surprise from Sloan's past; Jake receives some shocking news.
75	8	"Body of Evidence"	Deanne Foley	Marcus Robinson	December 3, 2014	608	N/A
Every Doyle is in the hot seat and trying to keep their stories straight when they all face a police interrogation after a security job gone wrong; Leslie and Jake withhold secrets from each other as the clock runs out on the case, which could land Jake back in jail; Des and Tinny have conflicting views on their relationship. Guest stars: John Kapelos
76	9	"Judgement Day"	John Vatcher	Perry Chafe	December 10, 2014	609	0.517
Jake's murder charge comes front and center; Leslie faces her own life-changing event with her job on the line; Des finds himself in the wrong place at the wrong time; Tinny is caught between her family and her job; the Doyles have 48 hours to solve a tangly case before their world changes forever. Guest star: Rick Mercer
77	10	"Last Call"	John Vatcher	Allan Hawco	December 10, 2014	610	0.731
Jake and Leslie fight for their lives as powerful enemies close ranks; the Doyles pull out every trick to protect their own and get help from an unexpected ally; but it's down to the wire to find the evidence they need to clear Jake of murder charges and secure freedom in the City of Legends. In the final minutes of the episode, a time jump of 2 years reveals Jake and Leslie have a set of twins and a third child on the way as the republic attends Des and Tinny's wedding.

== See also ==
- Sweating Bullets, referenced in Season 1, Episode 2 with guest star Rob Stewart
- "The Gift of the Magi", mentioned in Season 1, Episode 11
