= Michael Clowater =

Canadian filmmaker

Michael Clowater is a Canadian film director and screenwriter from New Brunswick, whose debut feature film Drive Back Home premiered in 2024.

Clowater, who worked principally as a television advertising director and made a number of short films in the 2010s, wrote the film based on an old family story about his grandfather and great uncle. Through his international connections, he was able to cast Charlie Creed-Miles and Alan Cumming in the film's lead roles despite being a relatively unknown novice filmmaker. He shot the film in 2023, in and around the North Bay, Ontario, area.

Drive Back Home premiered at the 2024 Cinéfest Sudbury International Film Festival. It was subsequently screened at the 2024 Calgary International Film Festival, where it won the audience award for Canadian narrative features.
