= Republic of Doyle =

Television series

- Genre: Comedy drama Police procedural
- Created by: Allan Hawco; Malcolm MacRury; Perry Chafe
- Starring: Allan Hawco; Seán McGinley; Lynda Boyd; Krystin Pellerin; Mark O'Brien; Marthe Bernard; Bob Cole
- Opening theme: "Oh Yeah" by Great Big Sea
- Original language: English
- No. of seasons: 6
- No. of episodes: 77 (list of episodes)

Production
- Executive producers: Allan Hawco, Perry Chafe, John Vatcher, Michael Levine
- Production locations: St. John's, Newfoundland and Labrador, Canada
- Cinematography: Malcolm Cross
- Running time: 44 minutes
- Production companies: Take the Shot Productions; Fireworks (2010–2011) (seasons 1–2); Content Film (2012–2014) (seasons 3–6)

Original release
- Network: CBC Television
- Release: January 6, 2010 – December 10, 2014

Republic of Doyle is a Canadian comedy-drama television series set in St. John's, Newfoundland and Labrador, which aired on CBC Television from January 6, 2010, to December 10, 2014.

The show stars Allan Hawco as private investigator and former police officer Jake Doyle and Seán McGinley as his father, retired police officer Malachy Doyle. They partner as private investigators with Rose Doyle, Malachy's second wife, played by Lynda Boyd, in St. John's. Krystin Pellerin stars as Constable/Sergeant Leslie Bennett, with Mark O'Brien as Desmond "Des" Courtney, who works with the Doyles, and Marthe Bernard as Katrina "Tinny" Doyle, Jake's niece and Malachy's granddaughter. Their cases involve them in all sorts of dealings – not all of them on the right side of the law.

== Cast ==
=== Main ===
- Allan Hawco as Jake Doyle
- Seán McGinley as Malachy Doyle
- Lynda Boyd as Rose Miller / Rose Doyle
- Krystin Pellerin as Leslie Bennett
- Rachel Wilson as Dr. Nikki Renholds (main, season 1; recurring, seasons 2–6)
- Mark O'Brien as Desmond "Des" Courtney
- Marthe Bernard as Katrina "Tinny" Doyle
- Bob Cole as 'The Republic'

=== Recurring ===
- Steve O'Connell as Sergeant Daniel Hood
- Sean Panting as Walter McLean
- Michelle Nolden as Allison Jenkins (seasons 2, 4, 6)
- Jonathan Goad as Christian Doyle
- Krista Bridges - Kathleen Doyle (seasons 3–6)
- Lola Tash as Sloan Daniels (seasons 5–6)
- Rick Roberts as Mayor William Cadigan Clarke (seasons 2–5)
- Jonathan Keltz as Grayson Mann (seasons 4–5)
- Patricia Isaac as Monica Hayward (season 4)
- Greg Malone as Finn

=== Notable guest appearances ===
- Oluniké Adeliyi as Harley Denief (season 5)
- Megan Follows as Warden Barton (season 6)
- A.J. Buckley as Alex Marshall (season 6)
- Nicholas Campbell as Martin Poole (seasons 1–5)
- Enrico Colantoni as Donny Pearl (season 6)
- Russell Crowe as Boyd Kelley (season 3)
- Alan Doyle as Wolf Redmond (seasons 2–6)
- Shawn Doyle as Carl Maher (seasons 1–4)
- Kevin Durand as Donny Squires (season 3)
- Victor Garber as Garrison Steele (seasons 1–5)
- Scott Grimes as Jimmy O'Rourke (seasons 3–6)
- Paul Gross as Kevin Crocker (seasons 2–5)
- Luis Guzmán as Charles Alomar (season 5)
- Natasha Henstridge as Inspector Valerie O'Brien (seasons 5–6)
- Robert Joy as Alex Kavanaugh (season 1–3)
- Angus Macfadyen as Gerald Byrne (season 4)
- Shaun Majumder as Benny Natchie (seasons 1–6)
- Max Martini as Big Charlie Archer (seasons 4–5)
- Stephen McHattie as Stack/Spencer Rennette (seasons 1–6)
- Rick Mercer as Mayor Budgell (season 6)
- Jason O'Mara as Seth Rankin (season 6)
- Gordon Pinsent as Maurice Becker (seasons 1–4)
- Serinda Swan as Patti Middlebrooks (season 5)
- Shannon Tweed as Frances Lemont (seasons 3–5)
- Emmanuelle Vaugier as Gabriele Del Toro (season 5)
- Mary Walsh as Miranda Cahill (seasons 1–6)
- Cathy Jones as Janet Chafe (season 1)
- R.H. Thomson as Francis Chafe (season 1)
- Stuart Margolin as Stanley Westcott (season 5)
- Jennifer Podemski as Maria House (season 5)
- Yannick Bisson as Bill Murdoch (season 5)
- Joel Thomas Hynes as Taylor Gossard (season 4)

== Characters ==
- Jake Doyle – Jake is a 30-year-old man living with his father Malachy because his ex-wife Nikki kicked him out. A former cop, he works as a private investigator with his father, Mal, and his father's wife, Rose. He is over-protective of his 16-year-old niece, Tinny. He is the second son and youngest child of Mal Doyle and his late wife Emily Ann. He drives a 1968 Pontiac GTO and wears a black leather jacket, both of which figure prominently and iconically throughout the series. After years of pursuit, in Season Four, he and Leslie Bennett become a couple. He also discovers in Season Five that he has a sixteen-year-old daughter, Sloan. Near the end of the series, Sloan reveals to Jake that it was all a scam and she forged the DNA test and isn't actually Jake's daughter. In the series finale, Leslie reveals to Jake that she is pregnant with twins and in the hospital after being shot by her supervisor, Inspector Vince Pickard, who attempted to kill her to hide his ties to corruption.
- Leslie Bennett – Leslie is a Constable, later Sergeant and Inspector, in the Royal Newfoundland Constabulary who is friends/lovers with Jake and gives him information to help with his cases. Leslie is Jake's source of distraction from his cases and personal life. She and Jake have feelings for each other, but seem to show them the wrong way, making their relationship complicated. From season four onwards their relationship has been growing stronger, until a secret from her past resurfaces. At the end, she is the mother of two of Jake's children, with another baby of theirs on the way.
- Malachy Doyle – Malachy, known as Mal or Skipper and Poppy, is a private investigator with his son, Jake in their business "Doyle and Doyle." He is 56 and has three “grown” children: Christian, Kathleen and Jake. He also has a granddaughter named Tinny, who is living with him while her mother (Kathleen Doyle) is away working in Alberta. His wife Rose lives with him, his granddaughter, and his youngest son Jake. He pokes fun at Jake's somewhat 'unsuccessful' relationships with women. He has since discovered he has a second granddaughter.
- Rose Doyle – Rose is Mal's wife, stepmother to Jake, Christian, and Kathleen, and step-grandmother to Tinny and Sloan. She works as the office manager/secretary for Doyle and Doyle. She seems to have a love/hate relationship with her husband's granddaughter Tinny and his son Jake, which has evolved over the series into motherly affection. Rose's criminal ex-husband, Martin Poole, keeps turning up.
- Nikki Renholds – Nikki is Jake's ex-wife. Nikki was a physician at a St. John's hospital. Nikki helped out with different cases in the first few episodes. She has since remarried, moved away, and has a son.
- Katrina 'Tinny' Doyle-Courtney – Tinny is the daughter of Kathleen Doyle. She lives with her grandfather, Mal or Poppy as she calls him, Uncle Jake and grandfather's wife, Rose. She is 16 and can't stand her grandfather and uncle's over-protective nature. She has a love/hate relationship with her grandfather's wife, Rose and one of the employees and main characters, Des Courtney. Tinny has since become a Constable with the Constabulary, and has begun dating Des. She is now Katrina 'Tinny' Doyle-Courtney after marrying Des.
- Des Courtney – Des is the fashion-challenged and delinquent graffiti artist who tags the town and Jake's beloved Pontiac GTO until Jake brings him to heel – and into the employ of Doyle and Doyle Investigations. He is 19 and has a crush on Tinny, leading Jake to dislike him. His real name is Pierce Redmond, and he is the son of the infamous, yet equally as dopey, Jody Redmond. Not wanting to be associated with his father, Des conceals his identity. He has grown from a delinquent to a valued member of Doyle & Doyle, specializing in the technological side of investigations. After a failed relationship with a medical student and surviving getting shot, he has begun dating Tinny. He is now married to Tinny Doyle-Courtney.
- Walter McLean – Walter has been Jake's best friend since kindergarten and his wing-man that used to be right behind Jake in a fight. Walter was Jake's lawyer in his divorce from his wife Nikki. Walter appears only sporadically. In season three he becomes romantically involved with Tinny's mother Kathleen. The status of their relationship is unknown, but presumed to be over.
- Allison Jenkins (season 2, guest starring in season 4) – Allison is the crown attorney and has all the things that turn Jake's head. What was once strictly professional turned into a romantic relationship, which ended when she realized Jake's feelings for Leslie were stronger than his feelings for her. She appeared briefly in season four.
- Sloan Daniels (seasons 5–6) - Initially believed to be Jake's sixteen-year-old daughter that he had with high school flame Ellen Daniels, Sloan spent her time in group homes before meeting the Doyles. In "Whistleblower" her half-sister arrives and reveals to the Doyles that she is not Jake's daughter after all and was simply conning them. She is responsible for bankrupting the Doyles, and eventually attempts to turn herself in to the police to make things right before Jake stops her. She leaves to go to Gander to live with her aunt.
- Kevin Crocker (guest starring in seasons 2, 4 and 5) - Jake's former partner on the force, and Tinny's biological father. Crocker was dismissed from the force for the presumed murder of a call girl, and has been on the run ever since. In Season Four he discovers that he is Tinny's father, much to Jake's initial dismay.

== Production ==
The show is filmed in and around St. John's, Newfoundland and Labrador. The show's star, Allan Hawco, is also executive producer/showrunner/co-creator and head writer of the show.

Other producers include John Vatcher (exec producer), Rob Blackie, Perry Chafe (co-creator and writer) and Michael Levine.

In 2013, Republic of Doyle aired a fictional crossover with another CBC Television crime drama, Murdoch Mysteries. With the two shows set over 100 years apart, Hawco appeared on the November 25, 2013 episode of Murdoch Mysteries as Jacob Doyle, a 19th-century ancestor of Jake Doyle, while Yannick Bisson appeared on the January 28, 2014 episode of Republic of Doyle as Detective Bill Murdoch, a 21st-century descendant of his regular character Detective William Murdoch.

== Season synopses ==
=== Season One ===
Premiering on January 6, 2010, the show introduces Allan Hawco as Jake Doyle and Sean McGinley as Mal Doyle as a father and son pair of private investigators. The debut show also reveals relationship complications with Jake and his ex-wife Nikki and his new infatuation: Leslie, a constable in the Royal Newfoundland Constabulary. While Jake tries to improve his relationship with Leslie, he discovers he may have impregnated his ex-wife, but soon discovers the positive pregnancy test he found in her garbage can did not belong to her. After he realizes he is free from the burden of having to deal with child-support, his relationship with Leslie develops as Nikki's relationship with her new boyfriend grows. However, Leslie soon begins to doubt whether her relationship with Jake will prove beneficial in the future. As Jake finalizes his divorce with Nikki, his relationship status with Leslie improves to good friends. Yet Leslie's focus quickly shifts to her new title as Sergeant after being promoted to the position. Jake realizes he has other problems too; his mischievous older brother, Christian, makes an unexpected visit to his house, greeting him in the kitchen. After Christian offends Jake, their relationship swiftly intensifies. The last episode of the season shows the characters’ struggle to keep their republic strong as their relationships fall apart.

=== Season Two ===
Season Two begins with Rose, Mal's partner, dealing with the consequences of his recent heart attack. Meanwhile, Jake and Leslie take initiatives to move past the hiccups in their relationship and move on from one another. Tinny, Jake's niece, embarks on an investment in order to raise personal funds, meanwhile, Mal discovers a secret that Rose has kept from him; her mother stole her engagement ring. Jake learns what Leslie sees their relationship as. As the season progresses, so does Tinny's income business along with the amount of friends she makes. Jake as well as the viewers are introduced to Allison, the crown attorney. Meanwhile, Mal and Rose experience issues in their marriage but are quickly able to recover and move forward. As Mal's relationship with Rose strengthens, so does Jake's relationship with Allison when they move past the boundaries of friendship. Des, an admirer of Tinny yet an enemy of Jake, exploits Tinny's business yet saves it in the process. Adding to the drama, Jake finds himself bailing his delinquent brother out of jail and finds himself dealing with issues concerning money. Like all his previous relationships, Jake mis-manages to maintain his relationship with Allison. When Jake receives a new job offer, his relationship with her struggles even further. Meanwhile, the relationship of Des and Tinny becomes more intimate. After further complications with Allison, they separate.

=== Season Three ===
In the opening episode of Season Three, the viewers are informed that Tinny travels to London. However, it is revealed by Des that her trip did not go smoothly but Des promises to keep this a secret. Jake finds himself interacting with Nikki again by doing a favor of which he is not fond. Jake struggles to avoid Nikki and win back the unimpressed Leslie. Rose gets in trouble with the police for carrying a gun. Tinny is bothered by the quickly growing relationship between Des and Chandra, a university student of medicine. Jake's sister Kathleen, a newly introduced character, is helped with her mothering issues by Rose. The two begin to progress in their friendship. Des finds himself in a precarious position—choosing between Tinny and Chandra. He decides to break up with Chandra and pursue a romance with Tinny. Kathleen faces parenting issues at home. Des attempts to impress Jake by helping him in an investigation using his various connections, while Allison jeopardizes the safety of the Doyle household with a mistake from her past. Mal becomes tied up in complications with his former wife while Tinny obsesses over her death and Kathleen experiences troubles in their relations as a result of a poor decision in Kathleen's history. George, an unappreciated individual in the Republic, bothers Kathleen by scamming her, but Jake comes to the rescue and saves her from his tricks. The season ends with Tinny discovering the identity of her father, which is not revealed to the viewers.

=== Season Four ===
The season kicks off with relatives from Ireland paying the Doyles a visit a bringing some drama along with them. As in the previous season, Tinny still tries to unravel hidden secrets about her dad and succeeds in doing so; she discovers her mother, Kathleen conceived her with a current prisoner, Kevin Crocker. Tinny attempts to associate with Crocker by revealing her true identity as his daughter. Jake tries to redefine his relationship with Leslie by reintroducing her into his world, and by doing so, he is able to once again gain her trust, as well as her affection. However; disaster strikes and Jake searches for the missing Leslie, who disappeared as a result of working a precarious case. Jake soon comes to the rescue, and saves Leslie from her kidnapper. Soon after the major incident, Leslie is hit by personal issues regarding family: her father dies. Meanwhile, Tinny's relations with Crocker grow and Jake is troubled by the fact that Tinny is spending so much time with the con. Jake takes another hit after being kidnapped as his kidnapper nearly takes his life by burning him to death. After being hit by a car in a parking garage, the medication used to mend Jake's injuries from the incident, gives him some peculiar dreams. The season comes to an end with Crocker and Jake being forced to collaborate in order to save the kidnapped Tinny.

=== Season Five ===
After the wild adventure Jake took in the previous season by saving Tinny, his rescue mission leads to his kidnapping. The Doyles have been anxiously searching for him for the past two months and Tinny risks her career as a police officer and becomes unprofessional by involving her personal life in her police work and helping Jake. As a result, Tinny gets suspended. Meanwhile, Des overcomes his sorrow over losing Tinny. Jake experiences more complications in returning to St. John's, but eventually makes it home safe with the help of his niece. Jake and Leslie's relationship improves up. When Leslie is being followed and nearly gets shot, Jake is extremely worried for her safety but soon finds out her pursuer is actually her long-lost husband. Jake and Leslie try but fail to smooth their relationship with the shocking news. Leslie and Jake are finally forced to define their relationship and decide not to see each other due to the recent complications, even after Jake confesses his love. After Des hooks up with a troubled young woman, Sloan, he must avoid Tinny. Jake finds it hard to avoid Leslie when he gets tied up in her ex-husband's business. Meanwhile, Tinny gets the chance of her career on a big case. To make matters worse for Jake, Nikki pays him a visit. The season ends with Jake being tried and arrested for murder but is then kidnapped by one of Leslie's pursuers; the kidnapper forces Jake to make several unwarranted missions.

=== Season Six ===
After being accused of murder, Jake must confront his enemies as he comes to terms with what happened to Leslie and try to clear his own name in the process. Leslie goes back to work a couple episodes in, but with conditions, and she must meet with the force therapist. Sloan gets into trouble and Jake must bail her out by making a deal with Vick Saul. Even though she was not cleared by her therapist after having a panic attack on duty, Leslie lends a hand to the Doyle clan to try and clear Jake's name before it is too late. When Leslie's past disobedience on the force comes to light, she must work harder than ever to save her job. Jake's murder conviction comes front and centre as the season comes to a final close with all the Doyle family trying to clear his name.

== Episodes ==
Season	Episodes	Originally released	
Season	Episodes	First released	Last released
1	12	January 6, 2010	April 7, 2010
2	13	January 12, 2011	April 6, 2011
3	13	January 11, 2012	April 4, 2012
4	13	January 6, 2013	April 21, 2013
5	16	October 2, 2013	February 5, 2014
6	10	October 15, 2014	December 10, 2014

== Reception ==
=== Ratings ===
Season	Timeslot (ET)	# Ep.	Premiered		Ended		TV season	Viewers
Season	Timeslot (ET)	# Ep.	Date	Premiere viewers	Date	Finale viewers	TV season	Viewers
1	Wednesday 9:00pm	12	January 6, 2010	969,000	April 7, 2010	?	2010	?
2	Wednesday 9:00pm	13	January 12, 2011	1,038,000	April 6, 2011	?	2011	?
3	Wednesday 9:00pm	13	January 11, 2012	?	April 4, 2012	968,000	2012	?
4	Sunday 9:00pm	13	January 6, 2013	802,000	April 21, 2013	?	2013	?
5	Wednesday 9:00pm	16	October 2, 2013	?	February 5, 2014	?	2014	?
6	Wednesday 9:00pm	10	October 15, 2014	?	December 10, 2014	?	2015	?

== Awards and nominations ==
=== Canadian Cinema Editors Awards ===
Year	Category	Nominee	Result	Ref
2011	Best Editing in Long Form Television Series	Michael Pacek	Nominated	

=== Canadian Comedy Awards ===
Year	Category	Nominee	Result	Ref
2011	Best Performance by a Male in a Television Series	Mark O'Brien	Nominated	
2014	Best Performance by a Male in a Television Series	Mark O'Brien	Nominated	

=== Canadian Screen Awards ===
Year	Category	Nominee	Result	Ref
2013	Best Performance in a Guest Role, Dramatic Series	Gordon Pinsent	Won	
2014	Best Cross-Platform Project, Fiction - The Republic of Doyle Ride-Along App	Allen Martin, Eva Riinitze, Fergus Heywood, Helen Asimakis, John Vatcher, Mike Evans, Rose Paton	Nominated	

=== Gemini Awards ===
Year	Category	Nominee	Result	Ref
2010	Best Dramatic Series	Allan Hawco, John Vatcher, Rob Blackie, Michael Levine	Nominated	
2010	Best Performance by an Actor in a Continuing Leading Dramatic Role	Allan Hawco	Nominated	
2010	Best Performance by an Actress in a Continuing Leading Dramatic Role	Lynda Boyd	Nominated	
2010	Best Performance by an Actress in a Featured Supporting Role in a Dramatic Series	Rachel Wilson	Nominated	
2010	Best Photography in a Dramatic Program or Series	Michael Storey	Nominated	
2011	Best Performance by an Actress in a Continuing Leading Dramatic Role	Krystin Pellerin	Nominated	
2011	Best Production Design or Art Direction in a Fiction Program or Series	Gordon Barnes	Nominated	
2011	Best Sound in a Dramatic Series	Scott Yates, Peter Clements, Harvey Hyslop, Andrew Tay, Paul Steffler, Mark Shnuriwsky, Lori Clarke	Nominated	

== Home media ==
Entertainment One has released all six seasons on DVD in Canada.

On September 6, 2016, eOne will release Republic of Doyle- The Complete Series on DVD in Canada.

Acorn Media has released the first two seasons on DVD in the USA.

In Region 4, Beyond Home Entertainment has released the first two seasons on DVD in Australia.

DVD name	Ep #	Release dates	
DVD name	Ep #	Region 1 (CAN)	Region 4
The Complete First Season	12	November 16, 2010	May 4, 2011
The Complete Second Season	13	July 19, 2011	April 4, 2012
The Complete Third Season	13	November 20, 2012	TBA
The Complete Fourth Season	13	October 1, 2013	TBA
The Complete Fifth Season	16	September 30, 2014	TBA
The Complete Sixth Season	10	April 21, 2015	TBA
The Complete Series	77	September 6, 2016	TBA

== International broadcasters ==
Country	Channel	Premiere date
South Africa	Fox Entertainment	August 1, 2010
United Kingdom	Alibi	October 27, 2010
Australia	ABC2 (season one); 13th Street (season two –)	November 6, 2010
Brazil	Globosat HD	November 11, 2010
Estonia	Fox Crime	September 11, 2010
Serbia	Fox Crime	October 14, 2010
Bulgaria	Fox Crime	December 4, 2010
Poland	TVP2	December 25, 2012
Germany	13th Street	October 16, 2013
United States	Syndicated/retroTV/Ovation TV	Fall 2013
Netherlands	13th Street	Until Friday March 13, 2015, daily Monday-Friday
