= Manon Briand =

Canadian film director and screenwriter

- Born: January 1, 1964 (age 62); Baie-Comeau, Quebec
- Occupations: film director, screenwriter
- Known for: Cosmos, Liverpool

Manon Briand (born January 1, 1964, in Baie-Comeau, Quebec) is a Canadian film director and screenwriter. After graduating in film studies from Concordia University, Briand went to France to study screenwriting in 1987. Returning home, she co-founded an independent filmmakers’ group, Les Films de l’Autre, and soon began directing. Her films include Letters of Transit (Les Sauf-conduits), a segment in Cosmos, 2 Seconds, Chaos and Desire, Liverpool and the television film Heart: The Marilyn Bell Story.

In 2023 she entered production on her latest feature film, All Stirred Up! (Tous toqués).
