= Kina & Yuk =

2023 French-Italian-Canadian documentary film

- Directed by: Guillaume Maidatchevsky
- Written by: Guillaume Lonergan; Guillaume Maidatchevsky; Michael Souhaité
- Narrated by: Virginie Efira (French); Benedetta Rossi (Italian)
- Production companies: Valdés; TF1 Studio; France 3 Cinéma; Les Productions Rivard; Christal Films Productions; Alder Entertainment; BNP Paribas Pictures; Canal+; France Télévisions; CNC; Téléfilm Canada; SODEC; Yukon Film Production Fund; Manitoba Film and Video Production Tax Credit
- Release date: 27 December 2023 (France)
- Countries: France; Italy; Canada
- Language: French
- Budget: $2,166,046
- Box office: $2,166,046

Kina & Yuk (French: Kina et Yuk, renards de la banquise) is a 2023 French-Italian-Canadian narrative nature adventure film that tells the adventure of two foxes, Kina and Yuk, who prepare to become parents for the first time where global warming is altering for everyone the rules.

Although sometimes described as a documentary, the film is officially listed as a fiction feature and combines real wildlife footage with a scripted narrative.

The film, shot in Yukon, is set in Dawson City in Canada (called in the movie "Jack City"). The film is narrated by Virginie Efira in French and by Benedetta Rossi in Italian. It was released in theaters in France on 27 December 2023, and in Italy on 7 March 2024.

== Plot ==
Kina and Yuk, two arctic foxes, are ready to found their family living in the Great North of Canada. The temperature is mild and food is more and more in short supply, forcing Yuk to venture himself every day more distant to provide food.

Suddenly, a terrible crunch accompanies the fracture of the arctic crust caused by the ice melting that twists the nature and separates the foxes, leaving them isolated on a different fragment of pack ice.

Kina and Yuk will have to challenge many dangers and explore new territories hoping to find themselves in time for their children's birth.

== Characters ==
The film features mostly animal characters, portrayed without dialogue.

- Kina – a white Arctic fox
- Yuk – a black Arctic fox
- Rita – a black-and-white dog appearing in the town sequences
- Virginie Efira – narrator (French version)

== Production ==
About five years ago while in Canada, I was struck by a newspaper article showing a photo of a small Arctic fox stranded on a piece of drifting iceberg. Some fishermen said they had found and recovered the trembling animal. To warm her, they had placed her in a box before releasing her. Reading that account, I wondered where that fox came from, what her path was and what would become of her. I started from that news story to write my story. For me, that image contained a very strong dramaturgy and that is exactly what I look for when I make a film

— Guillaume Maidatchevsky, director and writer of the film

Maidatchevsky wrote 300 pages with all the main sequences. The idea came when he read an article by a Canadian newspaper showing a polar fox on a drifting iceberg. He also said:

On set, the camera crew forms a 'circle of trust' around the animals, as if a sort of ballet was created between us and the animals. Depending on their attitude we can enter or exit the circle to varying degrees. If an animal is a little stressed, we move away; if it's quiet, we get closer. [...] Empathy for me is primordial, we must be able to enter the animal's head. [...] Because we must respect the times of the animal as an individual.

Benedetta Rossi, the Italian narrant voice, said in an interview: "We need to understand what happens to nature from an eye different from our".

== Distribution ==
The film was released in France on 27 December 2023, in Italy on 7 March 2024, and then in Germany on 16 January 2025.

== Reception ==
The film received positive reviews.
