= His Father's Son (2024 film) =

2024 Canadian drama film

- Directed by: Meelad Moaphi
- Screenplay by: Meelad Moaphi
- Produced by: Momo Daud; Meelad Moaphi
- Starring: Gus Tayari; Mitra Lohrasb; Alireza Shojaei; Parham Rownaghi; Romina D'Ugo
- Cinematography: Rico Moran
- Edited by: Daniel Montiel
- Production company: HFS Productions
- Distributed by: Mongrel Media
- Release date: September 19, 2024 (Cinéfest)
- Running time: 80 minutes
- Country: Canada
- Languages: English; Persian

His Father's Son is a Canadian drama film, directed by Meelad Moaphi and released in 2024. The film centres on an Iranian Canadian family living in Toronto, Ontario who find themselves in conflict when an old family friend in Iran dies and leaves money only to the family's youngest son.

== Plot ==
Farhad (Gus Tayari) and Arezou (Mitra Lohrasb) are the father and mother of an Iranian immigrant family who live in Toronto with their sons Amir (Alireza Shojaei) and Mahyar (Parham Rownaghi). Amir is resisting his father's pressure to engage with their Iranian heritage, and is dating Dina (Romina D'Ugo) and trying to build a career as a chef specializing in Italian, rather than Iranian, cuisine.

When Parviz, an old friend whom Farhad and Arezou have not seen or spoken to since leaving Iran, dies and leaves $1 million to Mahyar, Farhad states that this is merely a symbolic gesture in Iranian culture and the money is actually intended to be shared between both brothers — however, Amir is skeptical of this explanation, and begins to search for deeper understanding of the real reasons why his brother would have been left money by a man they have never met.

== Distribution ==
The film premiered at the 2024 Cinéfest Sudbury International Film Festival.

It was later screened at the 2024 Toronto Reel Asian International Film Festival and the 2025 Canadian Film Festival, before going into commercial release in June 2025.

== Critical response ==
Katharine Connell of The Globe and Mail wrote that the film "events have the quality of belonging to a play, not because the acting is stagey, but rather because the talk-heavy film makes little creative use of its audiovisual medium. Most spaces are visually uninteresting or cast in cool, neutral tones drained of aliveness...While restaurant scenes were shot at La Banane on Toronto’s Ossington strip, both this setting and the city more broadly appear generic. Even as this aesthetic treatment syncs up with the film’s themes of liminality and alienation, it amounts to a lack of sensuality – particularly striking when food figures largely – that doesn’t seem wholly intentional."

For Original Cin, Liam Lacey said that it was refreshing to see "an Iranian story that doesn’t involve a backstory about prison, torture, or threats from Iran’s theocratic dictatorship", stating that the film "is polished and well-paced, but the resolution involves some awkward narrative gaps, especially around the family’s favoured son Mahyar, including what exactly Mahyar does for a living that his parents view so approvingly."
