= Atsushi Funahashi =

Japanese film director (born 1974)

- Born: 1974 (age 50–51); Osaka Prefecture, Japan
- Occupation: Film director

Atsushi Funahashi (舩橋 淳, Funahashi Atsushi, born 1974) is a Japanese film director.

== Early life ==
After graduating from the University of Tokyo, Funahashi studied directing at the School of Visual Arts.

== Career ==
Funahashi directed Echoes in 2002. He returned with the 2005 road movie, Big River, starring Joe Odagiri, Chloe Snyder, and Kavi Raz.

His documentary film, Nuclear Nation, screened at the 62nd Berlin International Film Festival in 2012. He also directed Cold Bloom, a drama film set in Hitachi, Ibaraki, in 2013.

In 2015 he directed Nuclear Nation 2.

== Filmography ==
- Echoes (2002)
- Big River (2005)
- Deep in the Valley (2009)
- Nuclear Nation (2012)
- Cold Bloom (2013)
- Nuclear Nation II (2015)
- Raise Your Arms and Twist! Documentary of NMB48 (2016)
- Lovers on Borders (2018)
- Company Retreat (2020)
