= Shiori Itō =

Japanese journalist and filmmaker (born 1989)

- 伊藤詩織
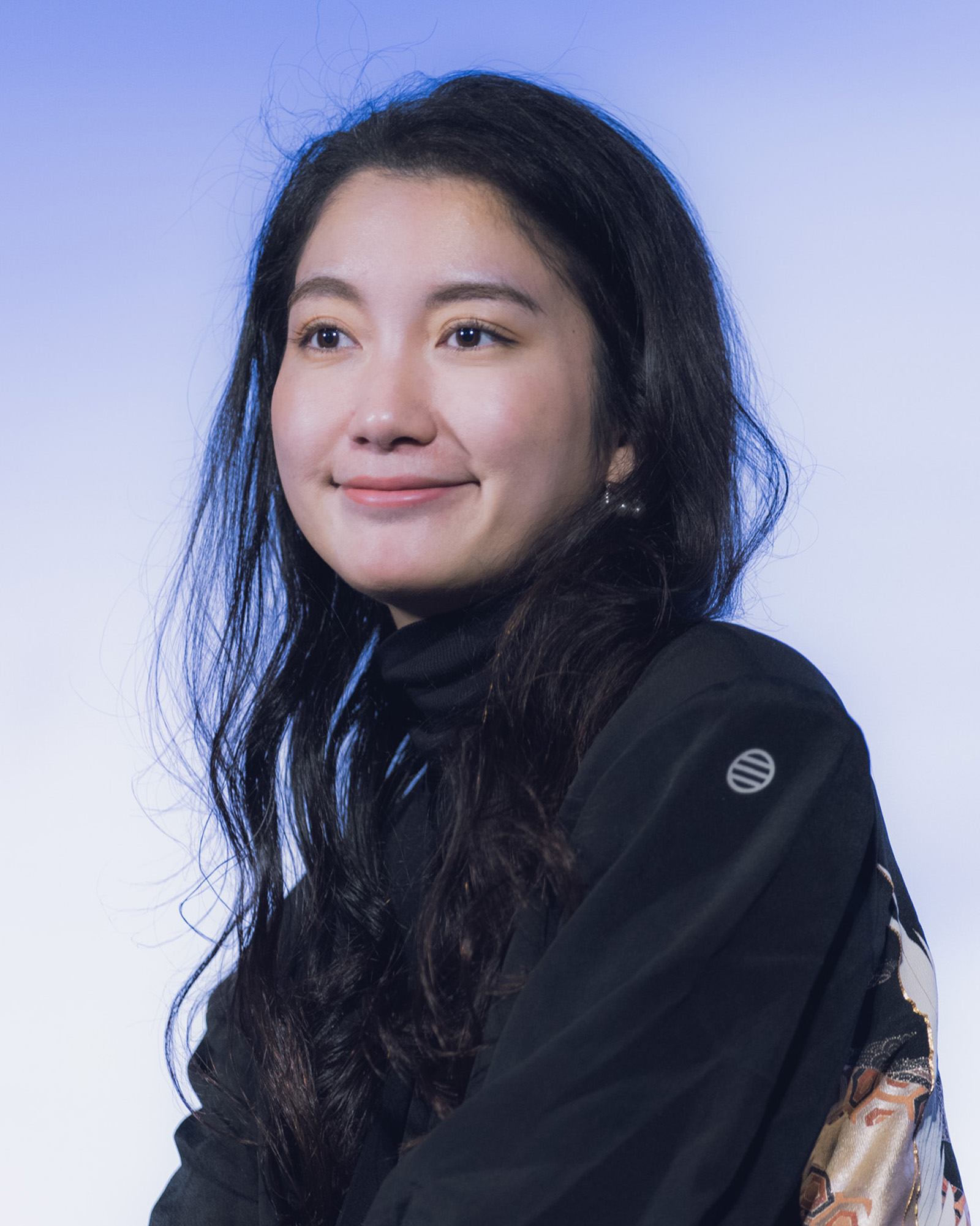
- Itō in 2025
- Born: 17 May 1989 (age 37)
- Occupations: Journalist, filmmaker
- Notable work: Black Box (2017); Japan's Secret Shame (2018); Black Box Diaries (2024)
- Website: www.shioriito.com

Shiori Itō (伊藤 詩織, Itō Shiori; born 1989) is a Japanese journalist and filmmaker. Her work focuses on gender equality and human rights issues. Itō's activism led to her inclusion in the Time 100 Most Influential People of 2020.

Itō gained international attention after speaking out about her experience of rape, a case that became a landmark for the MeToo movement in Japan. In 2017, Itō published the memoir Black Box and in 2024 her documentary Black Box Diaries was released to critical acclaim, garnering a Peabody Award and a nomination for Best Documentary Feature Film at the 97th Academy Awards.

== Biography ==
Shiori Itō was born in 1989, the first of three children. Her father worked in construction and her mother was a housewife. She began modeling at age 9. In high school, she did a homestay with a family in rural Kansas in the U.S. She intended to study journalism, and attended a junior college while saving money to study abroad.

Itō left Japan to study abroad in New York in 2012, where she majored in photography. She then transferred to Italy in 2013, and returned to New York in summer 2014, where she began an internship at the Nippon TV branch office there. She then returned to Japan, where she took up an internship at the Japanese branch of Reuters.

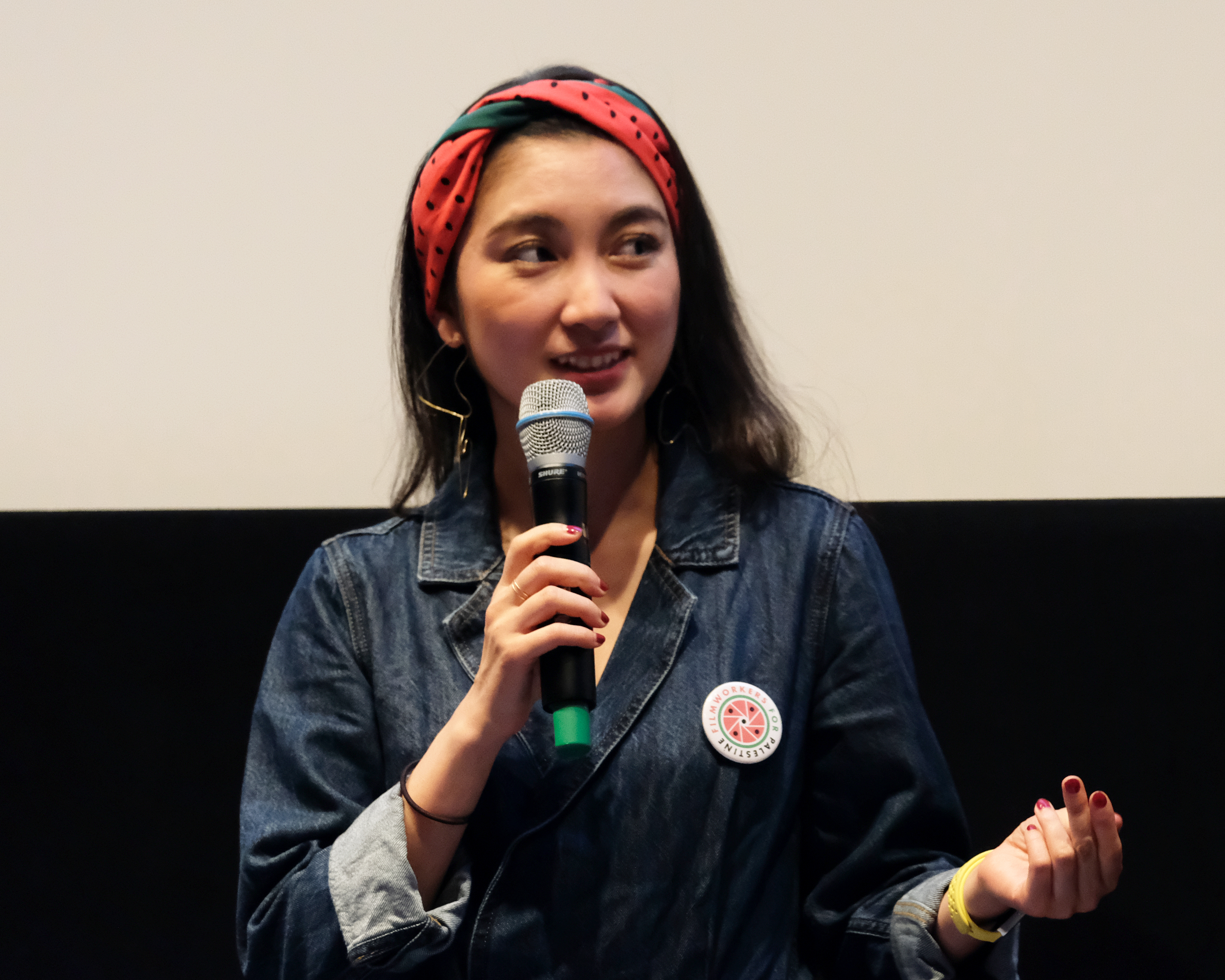
Itō at the 2024 Filmfest München

In 2013, Itō attended Marymount Manhattan College in New York where she majored in journalism and photography. In 2015, she interned at Thomson Reuters where she wrote a couple of columns on Japanese society. Itō is now a freelance journalist and filmmaker.

== Litigation ==
=== Sexual assault lawsuit ===
While interning at Thomson Reuters in 2015, Itō was at an izakaya (casual bar) in Ebisu, Shibuya with Noriyuki Yamaguchi, a prominent television journalist and acquaintance of the Japanese prime minister Shinzo Abe. She was drugged and was taken back to the hotel where, she alleged, Yamaguchi raped her. Despite security footage from the hotel showing that Itō appeared to be incapacitated and needed Yamaguchi's assistance to cross the hotel lobby, he denied the allegation, saying that she had agreed to consensual intercourse.

Itō said her experience with Japan's legal system showed her that victims of sex crimes were undermined and ignored. She called for the Japanese parliament to update Japan's laws regarding rape, which were over a century old. Itō explained how she could not get information on which hospital provides rape kits without going through a preliminary interview in person. When she went to the police, she was discouraged from filing a report, and was informed her career would be ruined if she did. Itō was told she did not act like a victim and had to be interviewed by several officers, including one who made her re-enact the rape with a dummy while he took pictures. Although the police initially said they would arrest Yamaguchi, the case and charges were unexpectedly dropped. Itō then went to the media, but no one would take her story. When she spoke about the experience at a press conference, she made national news and immediately started receiving backlash, hate mail, and threats. She has subsequently become the face of the Me Too movement in Japan.

The journalist's move was called bold by many because of Japan's history when it comes to addressing issues such as rape. The founding director of The Coalition For Women In Journalism, Kiran Nazish, said, "Women journalists face severe consequences for raising their voice and we support Shiori’s move to approach this legally in one of the landmark cases in Japan and the world."

Itō formally filed a civil suit against Yamaguchi in September 2017 for sexual assault in a hotel on 4 April 2015. Itō previously filed a police report in July 2016, although it was dropped by prosecutors for insufficient evidence. Itaru Nakamura, the acting chief of the Tokyo Metropolitan Police Department Investigative Division at the time with close personal and professional ties to Prime Minister Abe, (Note: Nakamura claimed his decision to drop the rape charges had "nothing to do with his personal relationship with Abe". Nakamura served as secretary to chief Cabinet secretary Yoshihide Suga in the Abe Administration (and had assumed the same post, for the opposition party) during 2009–2015. Subsequent to the Ito Shiori incident, he climbed to the pinnacle as head of the National Policy Agency in 2021, resigning after Abe's assassination.) admitted in the weekly magazine Shukan Shincho to having halted the probe and arrest warrant. Itō subsequently filed a complaint with the Committee for the Inquest of Prosecution, but a September 2017 ruling did not charge Yamaguchi since "there was no common law basis to overturn."

In December 2019, a Tokyo court awarded Itō ¥3.3 million (US$30,000) plus additional fees in damages from Yamaguchi, who stated that he would appeal the decision (she had initially sought from Yamaguchi ¥11 million (US$100,000) in compensation). Yamaguchi denied the charges and filed a countersuit, seeking ¥130 million (US$1,180,000) in compensation, claiming the incident was consensual and the ensuing accusations had damaged his reputation, although that suit was later turned down due to inconsistencies in his testimony. This ruling garnered international press coverage.

The Japanese high court upheld the lower court ruling in favor of Itō, ordering Yamaguchi to pay ¥3.3 million to her. The presiding judge concluded that Yamaguchi began sexual intercourse with an unconscious Itō. The court also ordered Itō to pay ¥550,000 to Yamaguchi for damages for defaming him by claiming in her book accusing him of giving her a date rape drug with no evidence. Both appealed their rulings. The top court upheld the lower court ruling ordering Yamaguchi to pay Itō ¥3.3 million in damages. The top court also ordered Itō to pay Yamaguchi ¥550,000 for defamation.

In 2017, Itō's memoir about the incident and her experiences that followed, Black Box, was published in Japanese. It was awarded the best journalism award by the Free Press Association of Japan in 2018. An English translation of the book by Allison Markin Powell was published on 13 July 2021.

=== Defamation lawsuit against Mio Sugita ===
In August 2020, Itō sued Japanese lower house member Mio Sugita of the ruling Liberal Democratic Party. Itō alleged that Sugita clicked "like" on a number of Twitter tweets that defamed her character. The lawsuit described some 25 defamatory tweets against Itō that Sugita interacted with, which included "botched attempt at obtaining work/job through sexual advances", (Note: The original term used is makura eigyō (枕営業) lit. "pillow salesmanship".) "honey trap", and "publicity stunt".

The lawsuit was originally dismissed by the Tokyo District Court, which excused the lawmaker's actions by opining that a "like" was not necessarily a statement of support, as users may merely employ the tool as a sort of "bookmark". In October 2022, the Tokyo High Court reversed the lower court's decision and ordered Sugita to pay Itō ¥550,000 in damages. The High Court found that the "like" did express support for defamatory content against Ms. Itō and infringed on her dignity. (Note: Exact legal language being "infringement of emotional esteem" (名誉感情の侵害).) Moreover, the consequential wide dissemination of the negative post constituted defamatory conduct beyond the limit, noting that Ms. Sugita, a National Diet member with over 100,000 followers, has influence beyond any ordinary citizen.

=== Defamation suit against Toshiko Hasumi ===
On 10 November 2022, the Tokyo High Court awarded Itō ¥1.1 million in a case against the cartoonist Toshiko Hasumi, who had posted five tweets between June 2017 and December 2019 suggesting Itō's rape accusations were false. The tweets included an illustration of an Itō look-alike with the term makura eigyō (枕営業, "pillow business" or "sleeping one's way to the top"). Hasumi asserted the illustration was not of Itō, but the court found it "an insult exceeding the permissible limits under social norms".

== Career ==
=== Acting and filmmaking ===
In 2000, Itō made a minor appearance as a child actor in The Whispered City, a drama directed by Jun Ichikawa.

In 2026, she was a co-producer and cast member of Ghost Town, a documentary directed by Katharine Round.

== Awards ==
- Free Press Association of Japan- Freedom Of The Press Award (2018) for Black Box
- New York Festivals - silver award (2018) for directing Undercover Asia: Lonely Deaths
- Newsweek 100 Most Respected Japanese (2019)
- Time 100 (2020) for her activism
- Tokyo Docs "Short Documentary Showcase Excellent Film Award" (2020) for directing I Killed My Flowers
- One Young World "One Young World Journalist of the Year 2022" for positive social impact of her work
- Academy of Motion Picture Arts and Sciences nomination for Best Documentary Feature Film (2025).
- The Cinema for Peace Dove for Justice for the film Black Box Diaries.
