= Mediha =

2023 American documentary film

- Directed by: Hasan Oswald
- Written by: Hasan Oswald
- Produced by: Fahrinisa Campana; Annelise Mecca; Stephen Nemeth; Hasan Oswald; Alexander Spiess
- Cinematography: Mediha Ibrahim Alhamad; Hasan Oswald
- Edited by: Kait Plum
- Music by: Henry Ross Bloomfield
- Release date: December 11, 2023 (Doc NYC)
- Running time: 90 minutes
- Country: United States
- Language: Kurdish

Mediha is a 2023 Kurdish-language American documentary film, written and directed by Hasan Oswald about Mediha Ibrahim Alhamad, who was kidnapped in the Sinjar massacre and sold into sexual slavery. Much of the footage in the documentary was filmed by Alhamad. It won the Grand Jury Prize at Doc NYC in New York City.

== Plot ==
In the summer of 2014, when she was 10 years old, Alhamad and her Yazidi family were kidnapped from their village during the Sinjar massacre in northern Iraq, by Islamic State (IS). She was sold into sexual slavery among IS fighters. After she was released and living in a camp for internally displaced people in Iraqi Kurdistan, c. 2019 she met American documentary filmmaker Oswald. Oswald gave her a film camera and with it she told her family's story, as well as documented the challenges she faced after captivity. Oswald turned her footage into the documentary Mediha

.

== Release ==
Mediha had its world premiere on November 12, 2023, at Doc NYC in New York City. Virtual Reality Experience and Virtual Production by Joe Mecca of N0va LLC

== Awards ==
- Grand Jury Prize, Doc NYC, New York City.

• Grand Jury Prize – U.S. Competition al DOC NYC (2023) • Grand Jury Award – Best Documentary Feature al Mammoth Lakes Film Festival (2024) • Grand Jury Award – Best Documentary al Pordenone Docs Fest • SIMA Ethos Jury Prize ai Social Impact Media Awards (SIMA Awards 2025) • Best Documentary Feature ai SIMA Awards (2025) • Festival Grand Prize – Best Film al prestigioso CPH:DOX (Copenaghen, 2024) • Best Documentary Feature al Florida Film Festival (2024)

Other Awards: • Activist Documentary Award al Movies that Matter Festival di Amsterdam (2024), assegnato direttamente alla protagonista Mediha Ibrahim Alhamad. • Audience Award (Best Documentary Feature) al Mammoth Lakes Film Festival (2024). • Audience Award Runner-Up al DOC NYC (2023). • Images of Courage Award al Pordenone Docs Fest. • Hernandez/Bayliss Prize for Triumph of the Human Spirit al Middlebury New Filmmakers Festival (MNFF) (2024).

Official Selections: • Human Rights Watch Film Festival (Londra, Toronto, New York) • Hot Docs Canadian International Documentary Festival • San Sebastián International Film Festival • Annapolis Film Festival • Lighthouse International Film Festival • BendFilm Festival Vuoi procedere in qualche modo? Posso aiutarti a: • Sapere su quali piattaforme di streaming è attualmente disponibile il film • Leggere una sintesi della storia vera di Mediha e della sua famiglia • Scoprire i dettagli sul coinvolgimento dell'attrice Emma Thompson nel progetto
