= Chaos and Desire =

- Theatrical release poster
- French: La turbulence des fluides
- Directed by: Manon Briand
- Written by: Manon Briand
- Produced by: Roger Frappier; Luc Besson; Pierre-Ange Le Pogam; Luc Vandal
- Starring: Pascale Bussières; Julie Gayet; Jean-Nicolas Verreault; Geneviève Bujold
- Cinematography: David Franco
- Edited by: Richard Comeau
- Music by: Simon Cloquet; Valmont Human
- Production companies: Max Films Productions; EuropaCorp
- Distributed by: Alliance Atlantis Vivafilm; EuropaCorp
- Release dates: September 6, 2002 (Quebec); December 11, 2002 (France)
- Running time: 113 minutes
- Countries: Canada; France
- Language: French
- Budget: C$10 million

Chaos and Desire (French: La Turbulence des fluides) is a 2002 Canadian-French drama film written and directed by Manon Briand. Starring Pascale Bussières, the film follows a seismologist investigating halted tides in her birthplace of Baie-Comeau, Quebec. It won awards at the 2002 Montreal World Film Festival and the 2003 Jutra Awards.

== Synopsis ==
Alice Bradley is a seismologist working in Japan. She returns to her birthplace of Baie-Comeau, Quebec, after the tides on the St. Lawrence River suddenly stop moving, which she suspects may signal an earthquake. As she investigates the phenomenon with Catherine, an old college friend and journalist, the town is affected by unusual heat, strange smells and unexplained behaviour among its residents. Alice is drawn to Marc Vandal, a pilot whose wife disappeared after a plane crash that may be connected to the tidal mystery.

== Cast ==
The cast includes:

- Pascale Bussières as Alice Bradley
- Julie Gayet as Catherine
- Jean-Nicolas Verreault as Marc Vandal
- Geneviève Bujold as Colette
- Vincent Bilodeau as Simon Deslandes
- Jean-Pierre Ronfard as Hans Peter
- Norman Helms as Michel
- Gabriel Arcand as the editor
- Emmanuel Charest as Bastien
- Pierre Lebeau as the pathologist

== Production ==
The film was produced by EuropaCorp and Max Films. It was written and directed by Manon Briand. Filming took place between July and November 2001. The film had an approximate budget of C$10 million.

== Release ==
The film was released theatrically in Quebec on 6 September 2002, and in France on 11 December 2002. In France, it opened on 80 screens. It has been available on DVD in Quebec and Europe since May 2003.

== Reception ==
=== Critical response ===
Derek Elley of Variety called the film "atmospheric and deftly humorous" and praised Pascale Bussières’s performance and David Franco’s widescreen visuals. Elley found the script too explicit in guiding the viewer, but wrote that the film, despite its supernatural premise, "skillfully negotiates its way around potholes of pretension".

=== Awards and recognition ===
The film won the audience award for Best Canadian Film at the 2002 Montreal World Film Festival, and received a Special Award at the 2003 Jutra Awards. It was also named one of Canada’s Top Ten films of 2002 by a panel assembled by the Toronto International Film Festival Group. The film also won the Grand Prix Hydro-Québec at the 2002 Abitibi-Témiscamingue International Film Festival.

== See also ==
- List of LGBT films directed by women
