= Itaru Nakamura =

Japanese police bureaucrat (born 1963)

Itaru Nakamura (born 4 July 1963) is a Japanese police officer who served as the 29th Chief of the National Police Agency from 2021 to 2022.

== Career ==
On 25 August 2022, he resigned as Chief as a result of failings surrounding the Assassination of Shinzo Abe one month prior after 36 years in police service.
