= 50th Hong Kong International Film Festival =

Film festival in Hong Kong

- HKIFF official poster
- Opening film: We Are All Strangers by Anthony Chen
- Closing film: Cyclone by Philip Yung
- Location: Hong Kong Cultural Centre
- Founded: 1977
- Hosted by: Supported by: The Hong Kong International Film Festival Society; Create Hong Kong
- Festival date: Opening: April 1, 2026; Closing: April 12, 2026
- Website: HKIFF 2026

Hong Kong International Film Festival
- 49th

The 50th Hong Kong International Film Festival (Chinese: 第50屆香港國際電影節) took place from 1 to 12 April 2026. HKIFF selected Jia Zhangke as the Filmmaker in Focus for this edition and featured masterclasses led by Chen Kaige, Tian Zhuangzhuang, Huang Jianxin, Tsai Ming-liang, and Ann Hui.

The festival opened with the Singaporean drama film We Are All Strangers by Anthony Chen, and closed with the Hong Kong drama film Cyclone by Philip Yung. This year, 215 films from 71 countries were screened, including 11 world premieres, four international premieres, and 49 Asian premieres. Angela Yuen, the ambassador of the 49th edition, returned alongside newcomer Tony Wu as the ambassador for this edition of the HKIFF, while Thai actor Metawin Opas-iamkajorn and Taiwanese actress Gingle Wang were named Asian Visionary ambassadors.

== Background ==
The theme of the 50th Hong Kong International Film Festival is "50 and Beyond: Framing the Future". The festival's poster was designed by Hong Kong comic artist and lyricist Siu Hak, which combines Hong Kong's landscape and imageries, such as UFOs, rockets, chimneys, and neon lights, representing "the film festival's imagination and exploration of the future". On 9 January 2026, Angela Yuen, the ambassador of the 49th Hong Kong International Film Festival, was announced to return as the ambassador, joining newcomer Tony Wu. To celebrate its golden jubilee, Thai actor Metawin Opas-iamkajorn and Taiwanese actress Gingle Wang were named Asian Visionary ambassadors, joining Yuen and Wu in promoting film culture during the festival. Also to celebrate the 50th anniversary, a live concert featuring soundtracks from Wong Kar-wai's In the Mood for Love (2000), performed by the Hong Kong Philharmonic Orchestra, was announced to take place on 2 and 3 April at the Hong Kong Cultural Centre. "50 and Beyond: The Hong Kong International Film Festival Golden Jubilee Exhibition", a free exhibition of archival materials, photographs, and footage on international cinema, was also held at Hong Kong City Hall. Lee explained that they chose City Hall as the venue because it was the location of the 1st Hong Kong International Film Festival in 1977.

Chinese filmmaker Jia Zhangke was revealed as the Filmmaker in Focus for the festival on 29 January. Albert Lee, the executive director of the Hong Kong International Film Festival Society, explained that Jia's debut film Xiao Shan Going Home (1995) was screened at the 22nd edition and "exposed his talent to an international audience", therefore they selected Jia to return for the festival's golden jubilee. A commemorative book on Jia was published in collaboration with Moleskine. In March, Chen Kaige, Tian Zhuangzhuang, Huang Jianxin, Tsai Ming-liang, and Ann Hui were announced as features in the Masterclass section. A full lineup was released on 10 March. Other notable guests at the festival included Juliette Binoche, Ildikó Enyedi, Anthony Chen, Pen-ek Ratanaruang, Edwin, and Ben Rivers.

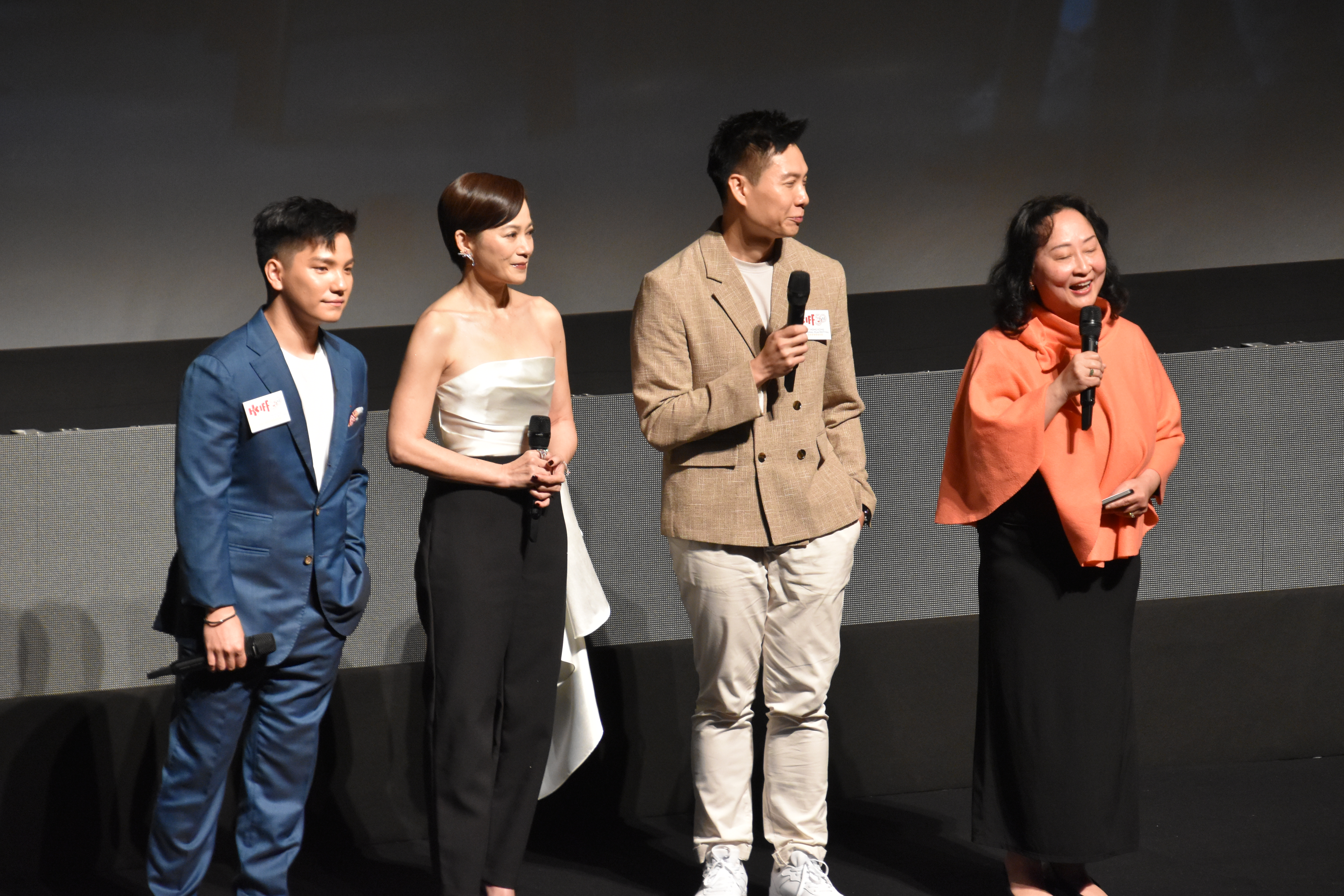
Koh Jia Ler, Yeo Yann Yann, and Anthony Chen at the premiere of We Are All Strangers

The film festival opened on 1 April at the Hong Kong Cultural Centre with the Singaporean drama film We Are All Strangers by Anthony Chen. Events took place at various venues, including the Hong Kong Cultural Centre, Premiere Elements, M+, iSQUARE, Hong Kong City Hall, Hong Kong Arts Centre, Gala Cinema, and East Kowloon Cultural Centre. A total of 215 films from 71 countries were screened, featuring 11 world premieres, four international premieres, and 49 Asian premieres. Ticket prices ranged from HK$55 to $100. It was part of the Entertainment Expo Hong Kong, featuring events such as the Hong Kong Filmart and 44th Hong Kong Film Awards taking place concurrently. However, the Asian Film Awards, which were usually held during the Expo, cancelled the main awards ceremony "to be low-key" due to the Wang Fuk Court fire.

The Chinese drama film Linka Linka by Tibetan director Kangdrun won the Firebird Award for the Young Cinema Competition (Chinese-language) and the FIPRESCI Prize, while the Austrian-German drama film Rose by Markus Schleinzer won the Firebird Award for the Young Cinema Competition (World). The multinational documentary Past Future Continuous by Morteza Ahmadvand and Firouzeh Khosrovanireceived the Firebird Award for Documentary Competition. The festival closed on 12 April with the Hong Kong drama film Cyclone by Philip Yung. Albert Lee stepped down as executive director of the Hong Kong International Film Festival Society following this edition of the festival.

== Jury ==
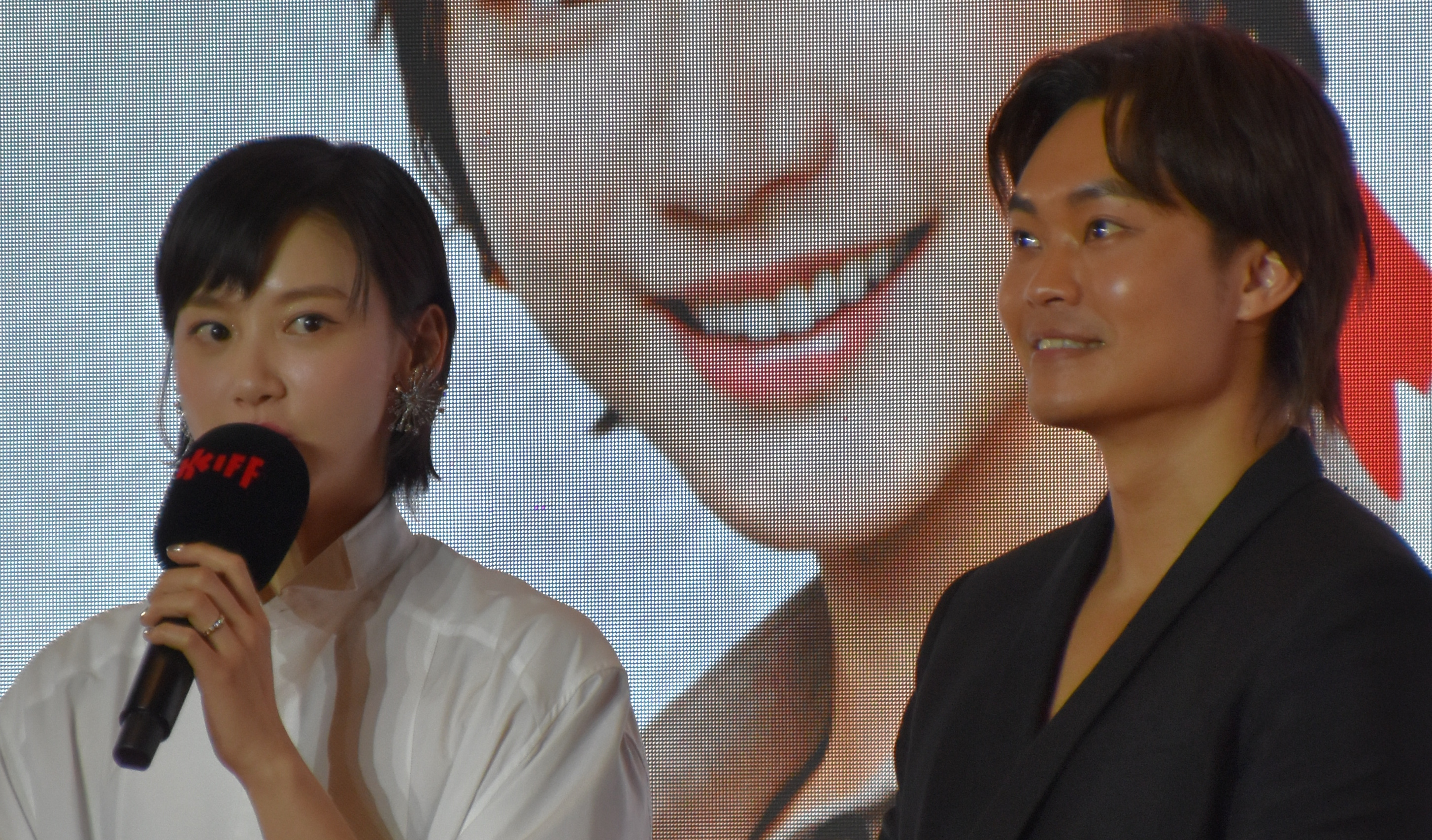
HKIFF ambassadors Angela Yuen and Tony Wu

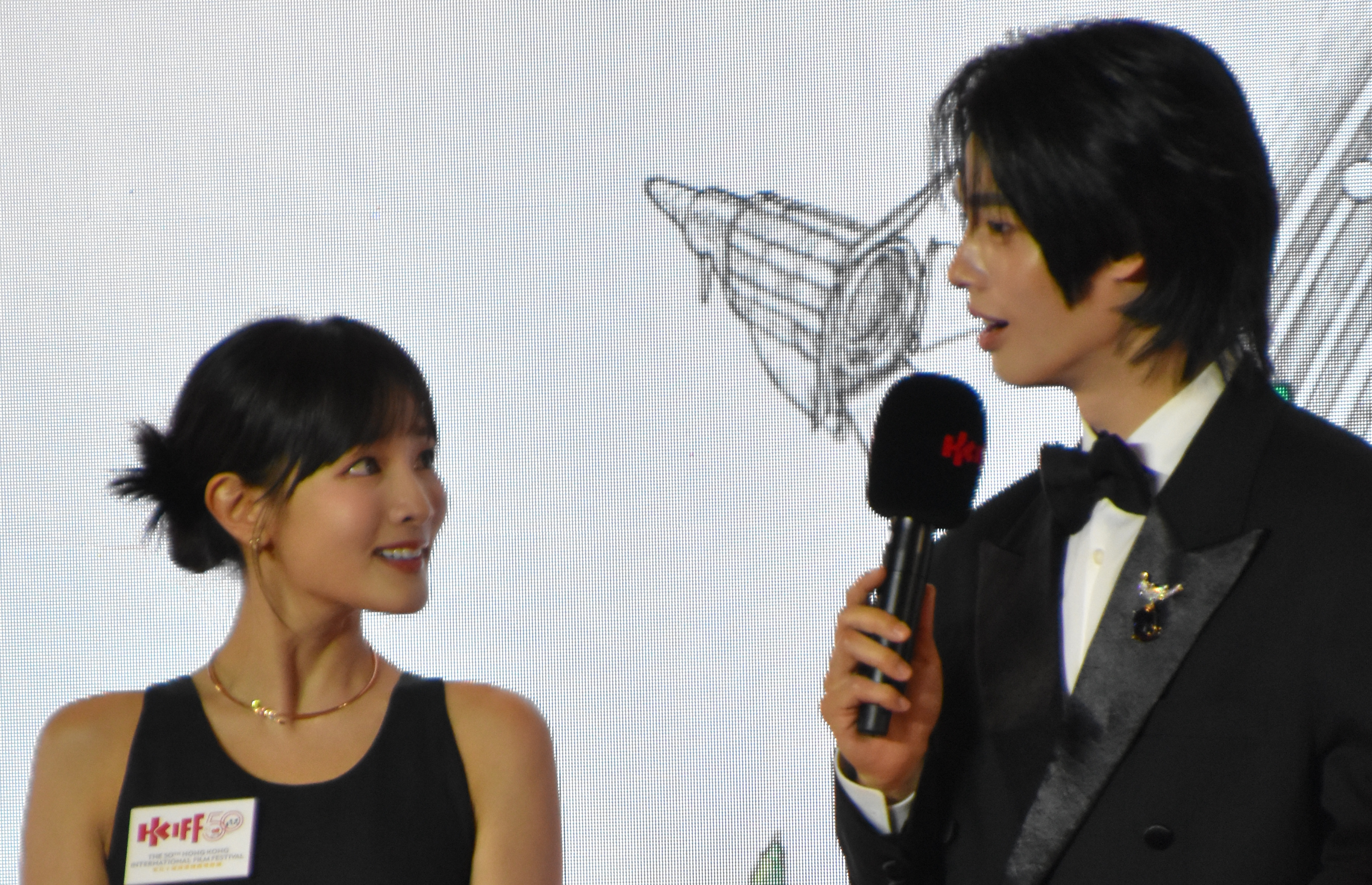
Asian Visionary ambassadors Gingle Wang and Metawin Opas-iamkajorn

The jury of the Firebird Awards comprises:

=== Young Cinema Competition (Chinese-language) ===
- Philip Yung, Hong Kong filmmaker
- Liang Ming, Chinese filmmaker
- Edward Lam, Hong Kong theatre director and screenwriter

=== Young Cinema Competition (World) ===
- Ildikó Enyedi, Hungarian filmmaker
- Edwin, Indonesian filmmaker
- Wim De Witte, programme director of Film Fest Gent

=== Documentary Competition ===
- Park Ki-yong, South Korean filmmaker
- Jessey Tsang, Hong Kong filmmaker
- Eric Nyari, Japan-based American filmmaker

== Program sections ==
=== Opening and closing films ===
The following films were chosen as the opening and closing features of the film festival, marking the Asian premieres of both films:

English title	Original title	Director(s)	Production countrie(s)
Opening film
We Are All Strangers	我們不是陌生人	Anthony Chen	Singapore
Closing film
Cyclone	超風	Philip Yung	Hong Kong

=== Gala Presentation ===
The following films have been selected for screening in the Gala Presentation section, marking the world premieres of We're Nothing At All, The Dating Menu, and Spare Queens:

English title	Original title	Director(s)	Production countrie(s)
Queen at Sea	—N/a	Lance Hammer	United Kingdom
Nouvelle Vague	—N/a	Richard Linklater	France, United States
Silent Friend	Stiller Freund	Ildikó Enyedi	Germany, France, Hungary
We're Nothing At All	我們不是什麼	Herman Yau	Hong Kong
The Dating Menu	廚師發辦	Amos Why, Frankie Chung	Hong Kong
Spare Queens	大分瓶	Tommy Tom	Hong Kong
A Foggy Tale	大濛	Chen Yu-hsun	Taiwan
Year One	Anno uno	Roberto Rossellini	Italy

=== Cinephile Paradise ===
The following films have been selected for screening in the Cinephile Paradise section:

English title	Original title	Director(s)	Production countrie(s)
After the Hunt	—N/a	Luca Guadagnino	United States, Italy
The Christophers	—N/a	Steven Soderbergh	United Kingdom, United States
Blue Moon	—N/a	Richard Linklater	United States, Ireland
Nouvelle Vague	—N/a	Richard Linklater	France, United States
The Drama	—N/a	Kristoffer Borgli	United States
EPiC: Elvis Presley in Concert	—N/a	Baz Luhrmann	United States, Australia
Mothertongue	春树	Zhang Lü	China
Gloaming in Luomu	罗目的黄昏	Zhang Lü	China
Mirrors No. 3	Miroirs No. 3	Christian Petzold	Germany
My Wife Cries	Meine Frau weint	Angela Schanelec	Germany, France
Sirāt	—N/a	Óliver Laxe	France, Spain
Sound of Falling	In die Sonne schauen	Mascha Schilinski	Germany
The Stranger	L'Étranger	François Ozon	France
The Voice of Hind Rajab	صوت هند رجب	Kaouther Ben Hania	Tunisia, France

=== Firebird Awards ===
==== Young Cinema Competition (Chinese-language) ====
The following films were selected to compete in the Young Cinema Competition (Chinese-language) at the Firebird Awards: Linka Linka emerged as the winner and won the FIPRESCI Prize, with Tan Siyou awarded Best Director for Amoeba, while Yu An-shun and Ong Xuan Jing were named Best Actor and Best Actress for their roles in A Dance with Rainbows and Ah Girl, respectively.

English title	Original title	Director(s)	Production countrie(s)
Ah Girl	泡泡糖女孩	Ang Geck Geck Priscilla	Singapore
Amoeba	核	Tan Siyou	Singapore, Netherlands, France, Spain, South Korea
A Dance with Rainbows	恨女的逆襲	Lee Yi-shan	Taiwan
Deep Quiet Room	深度安靜	Shen Ko-shang	Taiwan
Linka Linka	一個夜晚與三個夏天	Kangdrun	China
Nighttime Sounds	你的眼睛比太阳明亮	Zhang Zhongchen	China
Number 23	地下美人	Xia Hao	China
Shanghai Daughter	上海女兒	Agnis Shen	China

==== Young Cinema Competition (World) ====
The following films were selected to compete in the Young Cinema Competition (World) at the Firebird Awards: Rose emerged as the winner, with Andrius Blaževičius receiving Best Director for How to Divorce During the War, while Blue Heron's Edik Beddoes and I Understand Your Displeasure's Sabine Thalau were named Best Actor and Best Actress, respectively.

English title	Original title	Director(s)	Production countrie(s)
17	—N/a	Kosara Mitić	North Macedonia, Serbia, Slovenia
Blue Heron	—N/a	Sophy Romvari	Canada, Hungary
How to Divorce During the War	Skyrybos karo metu	Andrius Blaževičius	Lithuania, Luxembourg, Ireland
I Understand Your Displeasure	Ich verstehe Ihren Unmut	Kilian Armando Friedrich	Germany
The Ivy	Hiedra	Ana Cristina Barragán	Ecuador, Mexico, France, Spain
Redoubt	Värn	John Skoog	Sweden, Denmark, The Netherlands, Poland
Rose	—N/a	Markus Schleinzer	Austria, Germany
Variations on a Theme	Variasies op 'n tema	Jason Jacobs, Devon Delmar	South Africa, The Netherland, Qatar

==== Documentary Competition ====
The following films were selected to compete in the Young Cinema Competition (Documentary) at the Firebird Awards: Past Future Continuous was selected as the winner, while Yrsa Roca Fannberg received the jury prize for her work on The Ground Beneath Our Feet.

English title	Original title	Director(s)	Production countrie(s)
All My Sisters	—N/a	Massoud Bakhshi	Austria, France, Germany, Iran
Elephants & Squirrels	—N/a	Gregor Brändli	Switzerland
Good Valley Stories	Historias del buen valle	José Luis Guerin	Spain, France
Goodbye Sisters	—N/a	Alexander Murphy	France, Nepal
The Ground Beneath Our Feet	Jörðin undir fótum okkar	Yrsa Roca Fannberg	Iceland, Poland
Memory	—N/a	Vladlena Sandu	France, The Netherlands
Past Future Continuous	—N/a	Morteza Ahmadvand, Firouzeh Khosrovani	Iran, Norway, Italy
Whispers in the Woods	Le chant de forêts	Vincent Munier	France

=== Pan-Chinese Cinema ===
==== Filmmaker in Focus ====
Jia Zhangke was announced as the Filmmaker in Focus for the film festival on 29 January 2025, showcasing eleven of his previous works:

English title	Original title	Director(s)	Year of release	Production countrie(s)
Xiao Shan Going Home	小山回家	Jia Zhangke	1995	China
Xiao Wu	小武	Jia Zhangke	1998	China
Platform	站台	Jia Zhangke	2000	China
Unknown Pleasures	任逍遥	Jia Zhangke	2002	China
The World	世界	Jia Zhangke	2004	China
Dong	东	Jia Zhangke	2006	China
Still Life	三峡好人	Jia Zhangke	2006	China
24 City	二十四城记	Jia Zhangke	2008	China
Mountains May Depart	山河故人	Jia Zhangke	2015	China, France, Japan
Ash Is Purest White	江湖儿女	Jia Zhangke	2018	China
Caught by the Tides	风流一代	Jia Zhangke	2024	China
Jia Zhangke, A Guy from Fenyang	汾陽小子賈樟柯	Walter Salles	2014	Brazil

==== Chinese-language Restored Classics ====
Four restored Chinese classics were showcased as part of a sidebar at the film festival:

English title	Original title	Director(s)	Year of release	Production countrie(s)
Sorrows and Joys of a Middle-Aged Man	哀樂中年	Sang Hu	1949	China
Final Victory	最後勝利	Patrick Tam	1987	Hong Kong
Cageman	籠民	Jacob Cheung	1992	Hong Kong
Vive l'amour	愛情萬歲	Tsai Ming-liang	1994	Taiwan

=== Masters and Auteurs ===
==== The Masters ====
The following films were selected for screening in the Masterclass section:

English title	Original title	Director(s)	Production countrie(s)
Back Home	回家	Tsai Ming-liang	Taiwan
Below the Clouds	Sotto le nuvole	Gianfranco Rosi	Italy
The Day She Returns	그녀가 돌아온 날	Hong Sang-soo	South Korea
Franz	—N/a	Agnieszka Holland	Czech Republic, Germany, Poland
Ghost Elephants	—N/a	Werner Herzog	United States
La Grazia	—N/a	Paolo Sorrentino	Italy
Magellan	Magalhães	Lav Diaz	Portugal, Spain, France, The Philippines
Two Prosecutors	Zwei Staatsanwälte	Sergei Loznitsa	France, Germany, The Netherlands

==== Anthony Chen's 'Growing Up' Trilogy ====
The following films were selected for screening in the Masterclass section, with the Singaporean filmmaker Anthony Chen attending a seminar after the second screening of We Are All Strangers on 4 April 2026:

English title	Original title	Director(s)	Year	Production countrie(s)
Ilo Ilo	爸媽不在家	Anthony Chen	2013	Singapore
Wet Season	热带雨	Anthony Chen	2019	Singapore, Taiwan
We Are All Strangers	我们不是陌生人	Anthony Chen	2026	Singapore

==== Mary Stephen: Shades of Silk & Shorts ====
The following films were selected for screening in the Masterclass section, with the French-based Hong Kong filmmaker Mary Stephen attending a panel discussion with film critic Li Cheuk-to:

English title	Original title	Director(s)	Year	Production countrie(s)
Labyrinthe / Labyrinthe (Alternate Version)	—N/a	Mary Stephen	1973	Canada
The Great Canadian Puberty Rite	—N/a	Mary Stephen	1974	Canada
A Very Easy Death	—N/a	Mary Stephen	1975	Canada
Shades of Silk	Ombres de soie	Mary Stephen	1978	Canada, France
Palimpsest: The Story of a Name	隱蹟之書：重寫自我	Mary Stephen	2025	France, Hong Kong, Taiwan

==== Les Auteurs ====
The following films have been selected for screening in the Les Auteurs section:

English title	Original title	Director(s)	Production countrie(s)
The Captive	El cautivo	Alejandro Amenábar	Spain, Italy
Duse	—N/a	Pietro Marcello	Italy
The Love That Remains	Ástin Sem Eftir Er	Hlynur Pálmason	Iceland, Denmark, Sweden, France
Morte Cucina	ครัวสาว	Pen-ek Ratanaruang	Thailand, Singapore, Taiwan, France
Orphan	Árva	László Nemes	Hungary, United Kingdom, Germany, France
Romería	—N/a	Carla Simón	Spain, Germany
Salvation	Kurtuluş	Emin Alper	Turkey, France, The Netherlands, Greece
To the Victory!	За Перемогу!	Valentyn Vasyanovych	Ukraine, Lithuania
We Are the Fruits of the Forest	Nous Sommes les Fruits de la Forêt	Rithy Panh	Cambodia, France
Yes	Ken!	Nadav Lapid	France, Israel, Cyprus, Germany

=== Global Vision ===
The following films have been selected for screening in the Global Vision section:

English title	Original title	Director(s)	Production countrie(s)
Asia
Divine Comedy	کمدی الهی	Ali Asgari	Iran, Italy, France, Germany, Turkey
Halo	후광	Roh Young-wan	South Korea
On Your Lap	Pangku	Reza Rahadian	Indonesia, Saudi Arabia
Shape of Momo	Chhora Jastai	Tribeny Rai	India, South Korea
Spying Stars	—N/a	Vimukthi Jayasundara	France, Sri Lanka, India
Woman and Child	زن و بچه	Saeed Roustayi	Iran, France
Europe
Adam's Interest	L'intérêt d'Adam	Laura Wandel	France, Belgium
Good Boy	—N/a	Jan Komasa	Poland, United Kingdom
Hen	Kota	György Pálfi	Germany, Greece, Hungary
I Only Rest in the Storm	O Riso e a Faca	Pedro Pinho	Portugal, France, Brazil, Romania
Milk Teeth	Dinți de lapte	Mihai Mincan	Romania, France, Denmark, Greece
Phantoms of July	Sehnsucht in Sangerhausen	Julian Radlmaier	Germany
Pillion	—N/a	Harry Lighton	United Kingdom
Rose of Nevada	—N/a	Mark Jenkin	United Kingdom
Sundays	Los domingos	Alauda Ruiz de Azúa	Spain, France
Three Goodbyes	Tre ciotole	Isabel Coixet	Italy, Spain
Urchin	—N/a	Harris Dickinson	United Kingdom
America
The Chronology of Water	—N/a	Kristen Stewart	France, Latvia, United States
The Currents	Las corrientes	Milagros Mumenthaler	Switzerland, Argentina
Everything Else Is Noise	Lo demás es ruido	Nicolás Pereda	Mexico, Germany, Canada
On the Road	En el camino	David Pablos	Mexico
A Poet	Un poeta	Simón Mesa Soto	Colombia, Germany, Swede
Africa
Calle Málaga	—N/a	Maryam Touzani	Morocco, France, Spain, Germany
My Father's Shadow	—N/a	Akinola Davies Jr.	United Kingdom, Nigeria

=== Fantastic Beats ===
The following films have been selected for screening in the Fantastic Beats section:

English title	Original title	Director(s)	Production countrie(s)
All Greens	万事快調	Takashi Koyama	Japan
En Route To	지우러 가는 길	Yoo Jae-in	South Korea
Funky Freaky Freaks	충충충	Han Chang-lok	South Korea
Meets the World	ミーツ・ザ・ワールド	Daigo Matsui	Japan
Morte Cucina	ครัวสาว	Pen-ek Ratanaruang	Thailand
Truly Naked	—N/a	Muriel d’Ansembourg	Netherlands, Belgium, France

=== Focus ===
==== Juliette Binoche: The Choreographer of Emotion ====
The following films which starred French actress Juliette Binoche were selected for screening in the Focus section:

English title	Original title	Director(s)	Year of release	Production countrie(s)
Three Colours: Blue	Trois couleurs: Bleu	Krzysztof Kieślowski	1993	France, Poland, Switzerland
The English Patient	—N/a	Anthony Minghella	1996	United Kingdom, United States
Certified Copy	Copie conforme	Abbas Kiarostami	2010	France, Italy
In-I In Motion	—N/a	Juliette Binoche	2025	France

==== Revisiting Chinese Cinema: The Beginning of a New Journey ====
Twelve Chinese-language restored film classics were selected for showcase at the festival:

English title	Original title	Director(s)	Year of release	Production countrie(s)
The Butterfly Murders	蝶變	Tsui Hark	1979	Hong Kong
The Secret	瘋劫	Ann Hui	1979	Hong Kong
The Sword	名劍	Patrick Tam	1980	Hong Kong
In Our Time	光陰的故事	Edward Yang	1982	Taiwan
Ah Ying	半邊人	Allen Fong	1983	Hong Kong
Ah Fei	油麻菜籽	Wan Jen	1984	Taiwan
Yellow Earth	黄土地	Chen Kaige	1984	China
The Black Cannon Incident	黑砲事件	Huang Jianxin	1985	China
Dust in the Wind	戀戀風塵	Hou Hsiao-hsien	1986	Taiwan
The Horse Thief	盗马贼	Tian Zhuangzhuang	1986	China
Red Sorghum	红高粱	Zhang Yimou	1988	China
Rebels of the Neon God	青少年哪吒	Tsai Ming-liang	1992	Taiwan
