= Eduard von Feuchtersleben =

Polish mining engineer (1798–1857)

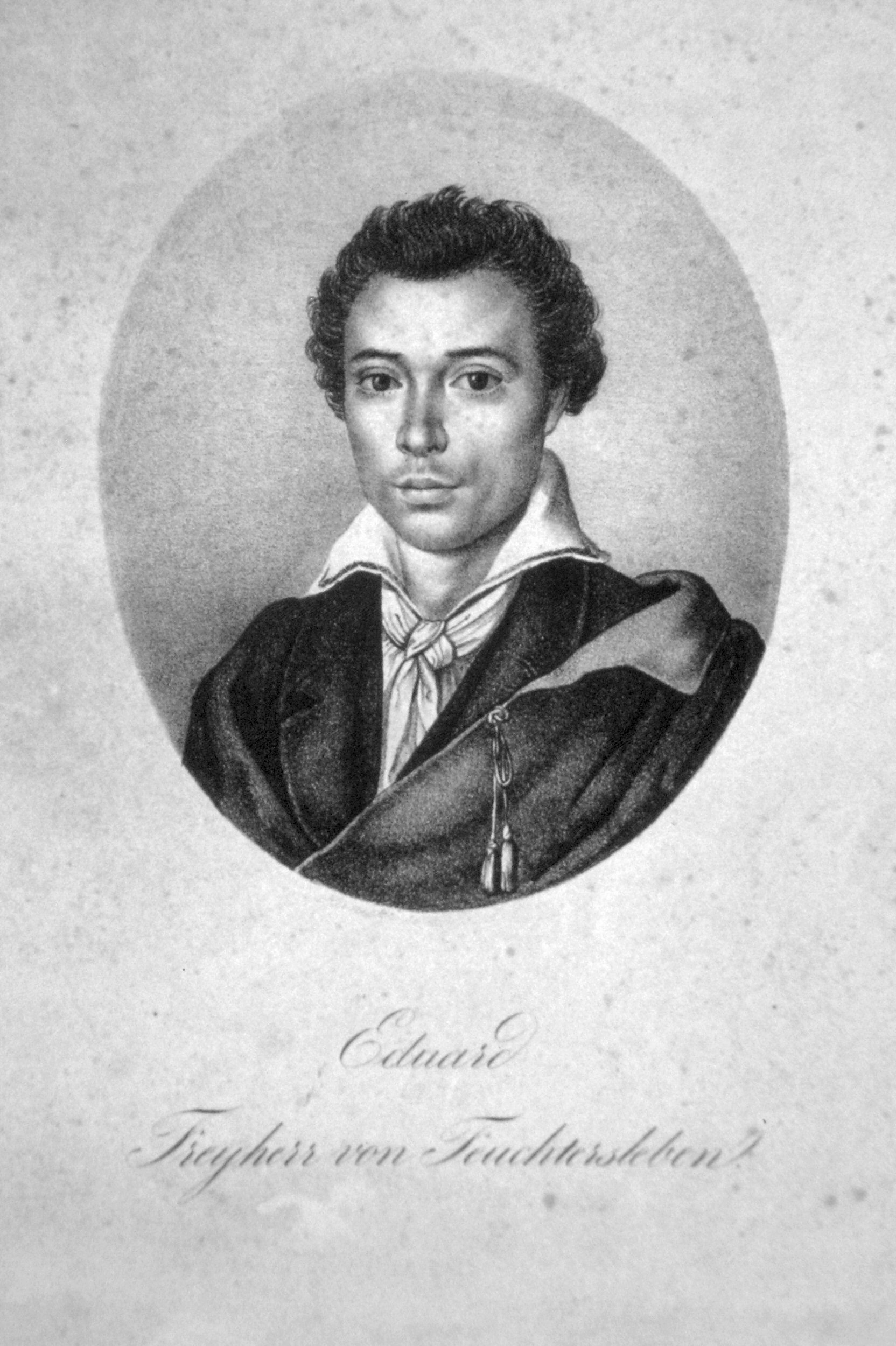
- Lithograph by Adolph Friedrich Kunike
- Born: 30 July 1798; Kraków, Habsburg Austria
- Died: 13 April 1857 (aged 58); Aussee, Austria
- Occupations: mining engineer writer
- Relatives: Ernst von Feuchtersleben, Karoline von Feuchtersleben, Angelo Soliman

Eduard Freiherr von Feuchtersleben (30 July 1798 – 13 April 1857 ) was a Kraków-born mining engineer and writer.

== Biography ==
Von Feuchtersleben was born in 1798. His parents were Josephine (1772–1801) and Ernst von Feuchtersleben (1765–1834), an engineer from Hildburghausen. Eduard's half-brother was Baron Ernst von Feuchtersleben, son of Ernst von Feuchtersleben from his second marriage.

Josephine was the daughter of African-born Austrian Angelo Soliman (1721–1796) whose body was secretly claimed after his death by Austrian Emperor Francis II who had Abbé Eberl remove the skin and stuff it for display as an African "savage" in his cabinet of curiosities.

At least since 1817, Eduard von Feuchtersleben wrote small plays, essays and poetry, which were printed since 1822. Since 1832, he was employed as a mining engineer in salt production in Aussee.

Among Eduard's friends were Franz Grillparzer (1791–1872), Eduard von Bauernfeld (1802–90), Nikolaus Lenau (1802–50), and Johann Ludwig Deinhardstein (1794–1859).

By his extensive enthusiasm for poetry in the romantic spirit, he encouraged his half-brother Ernst von Feuchtersleben to also deal with poetry. Eduard and Ernst von Feuchtersleben were deeply attached to each other, and Ernst dedicated some of his texts to the older half-brother. Ernst also campaigned for a complete edition of Eduard's works, but this project was never brought to fruition.

Eduard von Feuchtersleben never married and had no children. He died in 1857 in Bad Aussee.
