= Ernst, Baron von Feuchtersleben =

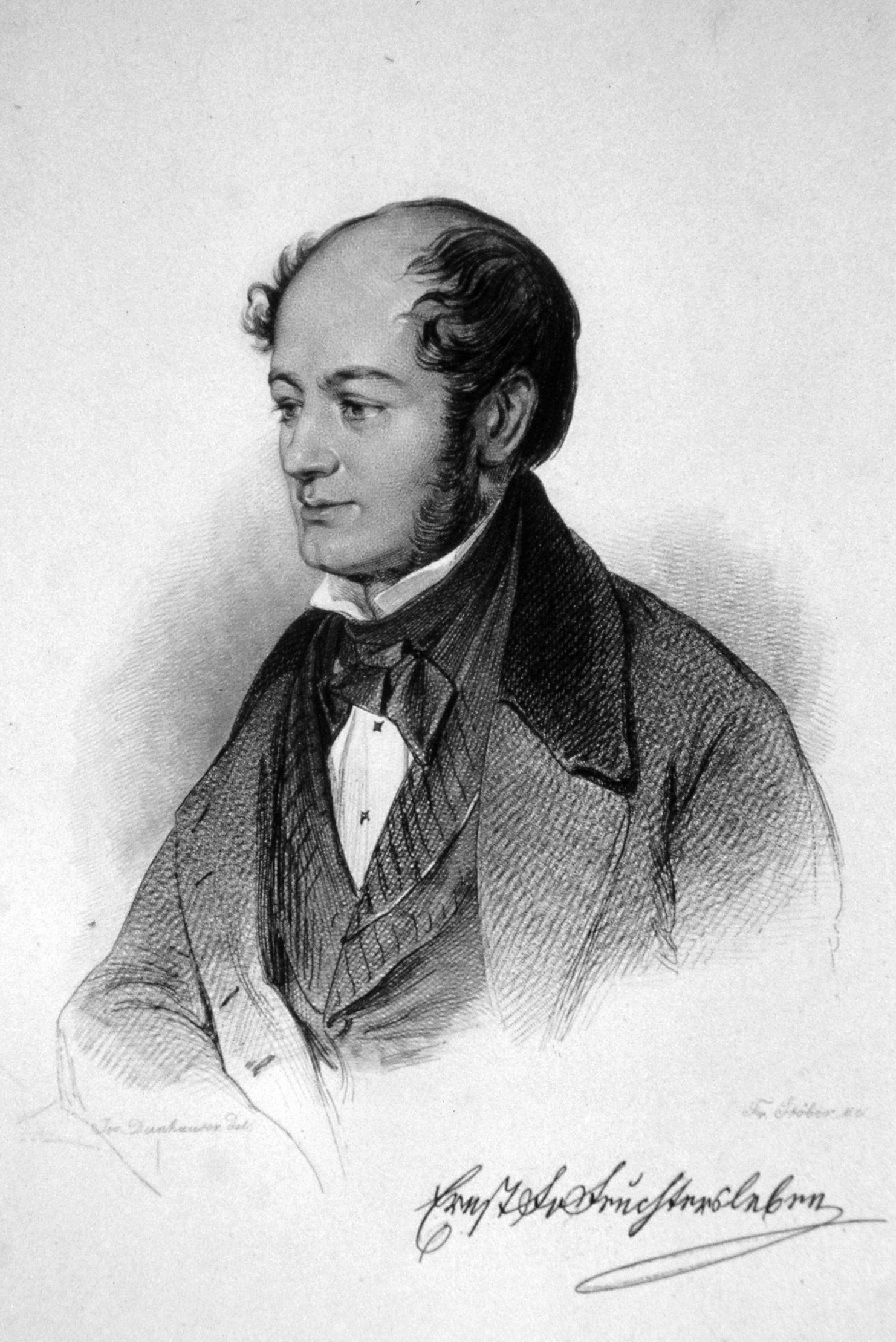
- Born: 29 April 1806; Vienna, Austria
- Died: 3 September 1849 (aged 43); Vienna, Austria
- Occupation: Physician
- Known for: Coining the word psychosis
- Relatives: Eduard von Feuchtersleben (brother); Karoline von Feuchtersleben

Baron Ernst von Feuchtersleben (full name: Ernst Maria Johann Karl Freiherr von Feuchtersleben; 29 April 1806 – 3 September 1849), was an Austrian medical doctor, poet and philosopher. He was a member of the von Feuchtersleben family.

== Life ==
He was born as son of Ernst von Feuchtersleben (1765–1834). He was of an old Saxon noble family. His older half-brother was Eduard von Feuchtersleben (1798–1857), son of Ernst von Feuchtersleben from his first marriage.

His father, a man of serious and stern character, attained the rank of aulic councillor in the Austrian civil service.

He attended the Theresian Academy in his native city, and in 1825 entered its university as a student of medicine. In 1833 he obtained the degree of doctor of medicine and settled in Vienna as a practicing surgeon. In 1834 he married. The young doctor kept up his connection with the university, where he lectured, and in 1844 was appointed dean of the faculty of medicine.

He cultivated the acquaintance of Franz Grillparzer, Heinrich Laube, and other intellectuals in Vienna. He interested himself greatly in educational matters, and in 1848, while refusing the presidency of the ministry of education, accepted the appointment of under secretary of state in that department. In this capacity he attempted to introduce some important reforms in the system of education, but, discouraged by the difficulties which he encountered, he resigned in December of the following year. His health gave way, and he died in Vienna on 3 September 1849.

== Works ==
Among his medical works were Über das hippokratische erste Buch von der Diät (Vienna, 1835) and Lehrbuch der ärztlichen Seelenkunde (1845). The latter was translated into English two years later as 'The Principles of Medical Psychology'. It is often credited as a first notable use of the term psychopathy, used with a broad meaning more accurate to its etymological literal sense (mental disorder) than today's usage. It has also often been credited with the coining of the term psychosis, which at that time had a similarly broad meaning to psychopathy, but this has since been traced back to Karl Friedrich Canstatt's Handbuch der Medicinischen Klinik (1841).

His poetical works include Gedichte (Stutt. 1836), among which is the well-known beautiful hymn, which Mendelssohn set to music, Es ist bestimmt in Gottes Rat. As a philosopher he is best known by his Zur Diätetik der Seele ("Dietetics of the soul") (Vienna, 1838), which attained great popularity, and the tendency of which, in contrast to Hufeland's Makrobiotik ("On the Art of Prolonging Life"), is to show the true way of rendering life harmonious and lovely. This work had by 1906 gone into fifty editions. Noteworthy also is his Beiträge zur Literatur-, Kunst- und Lebenstheorie (Vienna, 1837–1841), and an anthology, Geist der deutschen Klassiker (Vienna, 1851; third ed. 1865–1866). His collected works (with the exception of the purely medical ones) were published in 7 vols. by Friedrich Hebbel (Vienna, 1851–1853). See M. Necker, "Ernst von Feuchtersleben, der Freund Grillparzers," in the Jahrbuch der Grillparzer Gesellschaft, vol. iii (Vienna, 1893). According to the Encyclopædia Britannica Eleventh Edition, "He was a poet of fine aesthetical taste and a philosopher."
