= CPH:DOX 2025 =

2025 edition of film festival

- Opening film: Facing War
- Location: Copenhagen, Denmark
- Founded: 2003
- Awards: DOX:AWARD: Always
- Festival date: 19–30 March 2025
- Website: cphdox.dk

CPH:DOX
- 2026 2024

The 22nd Copenhagen International Documentary Film Festival, also known as CPH:DOX 2025 took place from 19 to 30 March 2025 in Copenhagen, Denmark. The festival is held annually to highlight non-fiction filmmaking from countries all over the world.

The festival opened with Tommy Gulliksen's Facing War, which follows the final years of Jens Stoltenberg as secretary general of NATO and the organization's role in the Russo-Ukrainian War. The main competition award went to Always by Deming Chen. A co-production between China, United States and France, it follows an eight-year-old boy from Hunan, who discovers poetry as a way to make sense of the world.

== Juries ==
The jury members were as follows:

=== DOX:AWARD ===
- Rikke Tambo Andersen, film producer
- Max Kestner, Danish documentary filmmaker
- Nicolas Rapold, American critic and editor
- Adele Tulli, Italian film director and researcher
- Raul Niño Zambrano, Dutch programmer and creative director of Sheffield DocFest

=== NEXT:WAVE ===
- Sissel Dargis Morell, Danish filmmaker
- Sona Karapoghosyan, Armenian film critic and program curator for the Yerevan International Film Festival
- Maria Palacios Cruz, British writer, educator and director of the Open City Documentary Festival

=== NEW:VISION ===
- Mason Leaver-Yap, British artist and curator
- Jeppe Lange, Denmark artist
- Marina Kožul, Croatian producer and programmer

=== F:ACT ===
- Alexis Bloom, South African-German film director and producer
- Mikala Krogh, Danish film director and editor-in-chief of DR Documentary
- Steffi Niederzoll, German filmmaker, artist and author

=== HUMAN:RIGHTS ===
- Mohamed Saïd Ouma, Comorian film director and executive director of Documentary Africa
- Tomáš Poštulka, Czech festival programmer and head of the One World Festival
- Birgitte Stærmose, Danish film director and screenwriter

=== NORDIC:DOX ===
- Butheina Kazim, Emirati festival programmer and founder or Cinema Akil
- Dario Oliveira, Portuguese artistic director and founder of Curtas Metragens Vila do Conde Film Festival
- Roja Pakari, Iranian film director

== Competitions ==
The films selected for each section are as follows:

=== DOX:AWARD ===
A highlighted title indicates the award winner.

English Title	Original Title	Director(s)	Production countrie(s)
À Demain sur la Lune		Thomas Balmès	France
Agatha's Almanac		Amalie Atkins	Canada
Always	从来	Deming Chen	United States, France, China
Balane 3		Ico Costa	Portugal, France
Facing War (opening film)		Tommy Gulliksen	Norway, Belgium
Flophouse America		Monica Strømdahl	Norway, Netherlands, United States
My Dear Theo		Alisa Kovalenko	Poland, Czech Republic, Ukraine
Sanatorium		Gar O'Rourke	Ireland, Ukraine, France
The Castle	Il castello indistruttibile	Danny Biancardi, Virginia Nardelli, Stefano La Rosa	France, Italy
The Father, the Song and the Holy Spirit	Faderen, Sønnerne og Helligånden	Christian Sønderby Jepsen	Denmark
The Helsinki Effect		Arthur Franck	Finland, Germany, Norway
We Live Here	Мы здесь живем	Zhanana Kurmasheva	Kazakhstan

=== NEW:VISION ===
A highlighted title indicates the award winner.

English Title	Original Title	Director(s)	Production countrie(s)
Perishable Idol		Majid Al-Remaih	France, Kuwait, Qatar
All These Summers		Therese Henningsen	United Kingdom, Denmark
City Child		Austin Lynch	United States, Germany
Unstable Rocks	Pedras Instáveis	Ewelina Rosinska, Nuno Barroso	Germany, Portugal
Available Light		Morgan Quaintance	United Kingdom
Images de Tunisie		Younes Ben Slimane	United Kingdom, France, Tunisia
Green Grey Black Brown		Yuyan Wang	South Korea, France, China
Melted Into the Sun		Saodat Ismailova	Uzbekistan, Italy, Portugal
Illiyeen		Eliyah Mesayer, Nanna Rebekka	Denmark
Songbook		Mariah Garnett	United States
Time Paradox		Minha Park	South Korea
Sinking Latitude	下沉纬度	Jiawei Zheng	Denmark, China
Siticulosa		Maeve Brennan	United kingdom, Denmark
Fear Fokol		Tuva Björk	Sweden
Ramallah, Palestine, December 2018		Juliette Le Monnyer	Belgium
International Satan's Day		Raed Yassin	Lebanon
Scrap	Rebut	Noémie Lobry	France

=== F:ACT AWARD ===
A highlighted title indicates the award winner.

English Title	Original Title	Director(s)	Production countrie(s)
2000 Meters to Andriivka (Note: The film also competed for the award from the HUMAN:RIGHTS section.)		Mstyslav Chernov	Ukraine
Antidote		James Jones	United Kingdom
K-Number		Seyoung Jo	South Korea
Men of War		Jen Gatien, Billy Corben	United States, Canada
Predators		David Osit	United States
The End of the Internet		Dylan Reibling	Canada
The Eukrainian		Viktor Nordenskiöld	Sweden, France, Ukraine, Belgium
The Gardener, the Buddhist & the Spy		Håvard Bustnes	Norway, Germant, United Kingdom
The Last Ambassador	Die letzte Botschafterin	Natalie Halla	Austria
The Perfect Neighbor		Geeta Gandbhir	United States

=== NORDIC:DOX ===
A highlighted title indicates the award winner.

English Title	Original Title	Director(s)	Production countrie(s)
Fighter		Sunniva Sundby, Mari Bakke Riise	Norway
If I Die Today	Hvis jeg dør i dag	Camilla Arlien	Denmark
Lowlands Kids		Sandra Winther	Denmark, United States
Portrait of a Confused Father		Gunnar Hall Jensen	Norway
The Ground Beneath Our Feet	Jörðin undir fótum okkar	Yrsa Roca Fannberg	Iceland, Poland
The Last Misfits by The Golden River	Aurinko laskee Lemmenjoella	Juho-Pekka Tanskanen	Finland
The Nicest Men on Earth	Verdens sødeste mænd	Josefine Exner, Sebastian Gerdes	Denmark
The Sequel to Summer Rain	Uppföljaren till Sommarregn	Viktor Johansson	Sweden
Walls - Akinni Inuk		Nina Paninnguaq Skydsbjerg, Sofie Rørdam	Greenland
Witch	Heks	Emil Nørgaard Munk	Denmark
Zlatan's Nose	Zlatans näsa	Nils Toftenow, Mathias Rosberg, Olle Toftenow	Sweden

=== HUMAN:RIGHTS AWARD ===
A highlighted title indicates the award winner.

English Title	Original Title	Director(s)	Production countrie(s)
9-Month Contract	ცხრათვიანი კონტრაქტი	Ketevan Vashagashvili	Georgia, Bulgaria, Germany
Black Water		Natxo Leuza	Spain
Girls & Gods		Arash T. Riahi, Verena Soltiz	Austria
Little Syria		Madalina Rosca, Reem Karssli	Portugal, Romania, Germany
Matabeleland		Nyasha Kadandara	Zimbabwe, Kenya, Botswana
Moria Six		Jennifer Mallmann	Germany
The Dialogue Police	Dialogpolisen	Susanna Edwards	Sweden
The Encampments		Michael T. Workman, Kei Pritsker	United States
The Lions by the River Tigris	Løvene ved elven Tigris	Zaradasht Ahmed	Norway, Netherlands

=== NEXT:WAVE AWARD ===
A highlighted title indicates the award winner.

English Title	Original Title	Director(s)	Production countrie(s)
50 Meters		Yomna Khattab	Egypt, Denmark, Saudi Arabia
Abode of Dawn	Sonnenstadt	Kristina Shtubert	Germany
Copan		Carine Wallauer	Brazil, France
Fantastic Family	En fantastisk familie	Nicoline Skotte	Denmark
I Am Night at Noonday	Je suis la nuit en plein midi	Gaspard Hirschi	France
ILOVERUSS		Tova Mozard	Sweden
Latina, Latina		Adrian Duncan	Ireland
Open Call		Sille Storihle	Norway
Red Forest	Forêt Rouge	Laurie Lassalle	France
The Golden Spurtle		Constantine Costi	United Kingdom, Australia
Unanimal		Sally Jacobson, Tuva Bjork	Sweden, France
Who Witnessed the Temples Fall	Quién vio los templos	Lucía Selva	Spain

=== INTER:ACTIVE AWARD ===
A highlighted title indicates the award winner.

English Title	Original Title	Format	Director(s)	Production countrie(s)
Aggregate		Videogame	Distraction	France
Constantinopoliad		Installation	Sister Sylvester, Nadah El Shazly	United Kingdom
Girlfriend Experience		Interactive Video Installation	Ugo Arsac	France
Huk, the Jaguaress	Huk, la Jaguaresa	Interactive Installation	Violeta Ayala	Australia, Canada, Bolivia
Natural Contacts		Interactive Installation	Mark Fingerhut, Matthew D Gantt, Bridget DeFranco, Peter Burr	United States
Songs of Travel		Mobile Game	Ben Wahl, Lisley Viraphong, Jack Gutmann	Austria
Tarang		Expanded Film	Kinnari Saraiya	United Kingdom
The Alluvials		Game	Alice Bucknell	United Kingdom
The Caring Machine		AI Art	Cecilie Waagner Falkenstrøm	Denmark
The Forest That Breathes Us		Virtual Reality	Jennifer Abbott	Canada
Truth Bears No Scandal	الـواضِح مو فـاضِح	Video Installation	Ahmed Umar	Norway
The Garden Says...		XR Performance	Uri Kranot, Michelle Kranot, Sara Topsøe Jensen, Sarah John, Marieke Breyne	Denmark

== Sections ==
The films selected for each section are as follows:

=== Special Premieres ===
The following section consists of exclusive premieres screening out of competition.

English Title	Original Title	Director(s)	Production countrie(s)
Animality		Ai Weiwei	Germany
Azza		Stefanie Brockhaus	Germany, Saudi Arabia
Casa	La Casa	Caroline Benarrosh	France
Everest Dark		Jereme Watt	Canada
Fission	Spaltung	João Pedro Prado, Anton Yaremchuk	Germany
Forever We Are Young		Grace Lee, Patty Ahn	United States, South Korea
How Deep is Your Love		Eleanor Mortimer	United Kingdom
It's Never Over, Jeff Buckley		Amy Berg	United States
Lost for Words		Hannah Papacek Harper	France, United Kingdom
Observer		Ian Cheney	United States
You Need This		Ryan Andrej Lough	United States

=== Highlights ===
The following section consists of films already screened at festivals and other acclaimed films.

English Title	Original Title	Director(s)	Production countrie(s)
A Family	Une famille	Christine Angot	France
A Sister's Tale		Leila Amini	Switzerland, France, Iran
About a Hero		Piotr Winiewicz	Denmark
Ai WeiWei's Turandot		Maxim Derevianko	Italy, United States
Blue Road - The Edna O'Brien Story		Sinéad O'Shea	Ireland, United Kingdom
Coexistence, My Ass!		Amber Fares	United States, France
Dear Tomorrow		Kaspar Astrup Schröder	Denmark, Sweden, Japan
How to Build a Library		Maia Lekow, Christopher King	Kenya
Letters from Wolf Street	Listy z Wilczej	Arjun Talwar	Poland, Germany
Mistress Dispeller		Elizabeth Lo	China, United States
Miyazaki, Spirit of Nature	Miyazaki, l’esprit de la nature	Leo Favier	France
Mr. Nobody Against Putin		Pavel Talankin, David Borenstein	Denmark, Czech Republic
Only on Earth		Robin Petré	Denmark, Spain
Paul		Denis Côté	Canada
Real		Adele Tulli	Italy
Seeds		Brittany Shyne	United States
Tata		Lina Vdovii, Radu Ciorniciuc	Romania, Germany, Netherlands
The Brink of Dreams	Rafaat Einy Ll Sama	Nada Riyadh, Ayman El Amir	Egypt, France, Qatar, Saudi Arabia
The Dating Game		Violet Du Feng	United States, United Kingdom, Norway
The Hobby: Tales from the Tabletop		Simon Ennis	Canada, United States
The Secret of Me		Grace Hughes-Hallett	United Kingdom, United States
The Shards		Masha Chernaya	Georgia, Germany
The Typewriter and Other Headaches	La machine a ecrire	Nicolas Philibert	France
Trans Memoria		Victoria Verseau	Sweden, France
Truth or Dare		Maja Classen	Germany
Twiggy		Sadie Frost	United Kingdom
Viktor		Olivier Sarbil	Denmark, Ukraine, France, United States
Where Dragons Live		Suzanne Raes	Netherlands, United Kingdom
Wishing on a Star		Peter Kerekes	Italy, Slovakia, Czech Republic, Austria, Croatia
Zodiac Killer Project		Charlie Shackleton	United Kingdom, United States

=== Artists & Auteurs ===
The following section consists of new films from "some of the world's most original artists and filmmakers".

English Title	Original Title	Director(s)	Production countrie(s)
Afternoons of Solitude	Tardes de soledad	Albert Serra	Spain, France, Portugal
Bogancloch		Ben Rivers	United Kingdom, Germany, Iceland
Collective Monologue	Monólogo colectivo	Jessica Sarah Rinland	Argentina, United Kingdom
Elementary	Apprendre	Claire Simon	France
W.O.M.B. (Worth of My Body)		Julienne Doko	Denmark
4.48 Dysphoria		Noah Holtegaard	Denmark
Movement		Benjamin Muasya	Denmark
They Know We Know They Lie		Isabella Solar Villaseca, Lou Mouw	Sweden, Denmark
I Am Everything		Jeppe Lange	Denmark
It's Not Me	Cést pas moi	Leos Carax	France
The Residents: Barking in the Dark		Marie Losier	France
Primitive Diversity		Alexander Kluge	Germany
Seen Unseen: An Anthology of (Auto)Censorship	Görünür Görünmez: Bir (Oto)Sansür Antolojisi	Firat Yucel, Erhan Örs, Sibil Çekmen, Serra Akcan, Nadir Sönmez, Hakan Bozyurt, Can Memiş, Belit Sağ	Netherlands, Turkey
Silent Observers	Тихи Наблюдатели	Eliza Petkova	Bulgaria, Germany
The Ban		Roisin Agnew	Ireland, United Kingdom
The Diary of a Sky		Lawrence Abu Hamdan	Lebanon
The More Naked We Dare to Be		Jon Bang Carlsen	Denmark
Youth (Hard Times)	青春：苦	Wang Bing	France, Netherlands, Luxembourg
Youth (Homecoming)	青春：归	Wang Bing	France, Netherlands, Luxembourg

=== PARA:FICTIONS ===
The following section consists of films in the field between documentary and fiction.

English Title	Original Title	Director(s)	Production countrie(s)
Bluish		Lilith Kraxner, Milena Czernovsky	Austria
Caught by the Tides	风流一代	Jia Zhangke	China
Fire of Wind	Fogo do Vento	Marta Mateus	Portugal, Switzerland, France
Grand Tour		Miguel Gomes	Portugal, Italy, France
Holy Electricity	წმინდა ელექტროენერგია	Tato Kotetishvili	Georgia, Netherlands
Kontinental '25		Radu Jude	Romania
Mika Ex Machina		Mika Tard, Deborah Saïag	France
The Shipwrecked Triptych	Das Schiffbruch-Triptychon	Deniz Eroglu	Germany
The Wolves Always Come at Night		Gabrielle Brady	Australia, Mongolia, Germany
To a Land Unknown		Mahdi Fleifel	United Kingdom, Palestine, France, Greece, Netherlands, Qatar, Saudi Arabia
When the Phone Rang	Kada je zazvonio telefon	Iva Radivojević	Serbia, United States

=== Sound & Vision ===
The following section consists of films related to music.

English Title	Original Title	Director(s)	Production countrie(s)
A Stranger in the World	Ein er ei eiga eining	Sturla Pilskog	Norway
Becoming Madonna		Michael Ogden	United Kingdom, United States
Cosmic Balance		Andreas Johnsen	Denmark, Indonesia
Disco's Revenge		Omar Majeed, Peter Mishara	Canada
Elendig Software		Freja Rørkær, Oskar Langballe Dahl	Denmark
Ellis Park		Justin Kurzel	Australia, Indonesia, France
From Here Where We Stand - 80 Years with Niels Skousen	Herfra hvor vi står – 80 år med Niels Skousen	Linda Wendel	Denmark
Googoosh - Made of Fire		Niloufar Taghizadeh	Germany
Legacy		Manal Masri	Sweden, United States
Nobody's Angel	Endeløse nat	Torben Skjødt Jensen	Denmark
Ol' Dirty Bastard: A Tale of Two Dirtys		Sam Pollard, Jason Pollard	United States
One to One: John & Yoko		Kevin Macdonald, Sam Rice-Edwards	United Kingdom
Pauline Black: A 2-Tone Story		Jane Mingay	United Kingdom
Pavements		Alex Ross Perry	United States
Rave		Łukasz Ronduda, Dawid Nickel	Poland
The Sound of Love Letters	Kærestebreve fra Thy	Tammes Bernstein	Denmark
TV-2: Kys det satans liv		Jesper Skaaning	Denmark

=== Urgent Matters ===
The following section consists of films with topical, political and relevant themes.

English Title	Original Title	Director(s)	Production countrie(s)
Apocalypse in the Tropics	Apocalipse nos Trópicos	Petra Costa	Brazil
Dream Without Mercy		Waad Al-Kateab	United Kingdom
From Ground Zero	قصص غير محكية من غزة من المسافة صفر	Various directors (Note: The film is composed of 22 short films directed by Aws Al-Banna, Ahmed Al-Danf, Basil Al-Maqousi, Mustafa Al-Nabih, Muhammad Alshareef, Ala Ayob, Bashar Al Balbisi, Alaa Damo, Awad Hana, Ahmad Hassunah, Mustafa Kallab, Satoum Kareem, Mahdi Karera, Rabab Khamees, Khamees Masharawi, Wissam Moussa, Tamer Najm, Abu Hasna Nidaa, Damo Nidal, Mahmoud Reema, Etimad Weshah, and Islam Al Zrieai.)	Palestine, France, Qatar, Jordan
Hacking Hate		Simon Klose	Sweden, Denmark, Norway
On the Border		Gabriela Schild, Gerald Igor Hauzenberger	Austria, Germany, Switzerland
Save Our Souls		Jean-Baptiste Bonnet	France
Songs of Slow Burning Earth	Пісні землі, що повільно горить	Olha Zhurba	Ukraine, Denmark, Sweden, France
Sudan, Remember Us	السودان يا غالي	Hind Meddeb	France, Tunisia, Qatar
The Bibi Files		Alexis Bloom	United States
The Last Republican		Steve Pink	United States
The Tender Revolution	Die zärtliche Revolution	Annelie Boros	Germany
Writing Hawa		Najiba Noori, Rasul Noori	France, Netherlands, Qatar, Afghanistan

=== Backstory ===
The following section consists of films that trace back through history.

English Title	Original Title	Director(s)	Production countrie(s)
Bright Future	Viitor Luminos	Andra MacMasters	Romania
Fiume o morte!		Igor Bezinović	Croatia, Italy, Slovenia
Israel Palestine on Swedish TV 1958-1989		Göran Hugo Olsson	Sweden, Finland, Denmark
My Sweet Land	Տունս քաղցր ա	Sareen Hairabedian	United States, Jordan, France, Ireland
Rule of Stone		Danae Elon	Canada, Israel
Scars of a Putsch		Nathalie Borgers	Austria, Belgium
The Helsinki Effect		Arthur Franck	Finland, Germany, Norway
The White House Effect		Pedro Kos, Jon Shenk, Bonni Cohen	United States

=== Science ===
The following section consists of films exploring the encounter between cinema, science and society.

English Title	Original Title	Director(s)	Production countrie(s)
Climate in Therapy		Nathan Grossman	Sweden, Norway
Dust & Flow: Muds, Movement, Time, Scale		Rikke Luther	Iceland, Sweden, Denmark
I Think We Begin as Light	Jeg tror, vi starter som lys	Emma Harris, Sille Skovgaard	Denmark
Family Fortunes		Mila Turajlić	Serbia, United States
Victoria		Sam Soko	Kenya, United States
A Robust Heart		Martín Benchimol	Argentina, United States
Public Pool		Elizabeth Lo	United States
GEN_		Gianluca Matarrese	France, Italy, Switzerland
Human Race		Simon Lec	Denmark, United Kingdom, Norway, Germany, Switzerland, United States
Hidrogen - Revolution or Illusion?	Wasserstoff - Revolution oder Illusion?	Andreas Pichler	Germany, Italy, Norway
Lost Wolves of Yellowstone		Thomas Winston	United States
Memory Wars		Hendrik Löbbert	Germany
Spacewoman		Hannah Berryman	United Kingdom
The Shadow Scholard		Eloise King	United Kingdom
Teenage Life Interrupted	Uten synlige tegn	Åse Svenheim Drivenes	Norway
Tracing Light		Thomas Riedelsheimer	Germany, United Kingdom

=== DANISH:DOX ===
The following section consists of new Danish documentaries from both established and upcoming filmmakers.

English Title	Original Title	Director(s)	Production countrie(s)
Another World	Den Anden Verden	Søren Peter Langkjær Bojsen	Denmark
Birthdays	Fødselsdage	Adrian Jalily	Denmark
Cirkeline and the Invisible Artist	Cirkeline & den usynlige tegner	Esther Wellejus	Denmark
Close to Home		Shubhdeep Singh Parwana	Denmark, India
Europe Endless	Europa Endlos	Thomas Elley	Denmark
The Garden Caretaker		Natalia Anna Ciepiel, William Andreas Wivel	Denmark
The House	Maja	Carl Olsson	Estonia, Sweden
In Search of the Miraculous		Sybilla Tuxen	Denmark
Love, Z		Anna-Sofie Uth Juncker	Denmark
The Ox Road	Hærvejen	Jesper H. Grand	Denmark
The Silence in My Heart	Tavsheden i mit hjerte	Lene Kamm	Denmark
Take the Money and Run		Ole Juncker	Denmark
Witch	Heks	Emil Nørgaard Munk	Denmark

== Awards ==
The following awards were presented:

- DOX:AWARD: Always by Deming Chen
  - Special Mention: Flophouse America by Monica Strømdahl
- F:ACT AWARD: 2000 Meters to Andriivka by Mstyslav Chernov
  - Special Mention: The Perfect Neighbor by Geeta Gandbhir
- HUMAN:RIGHTS AWARD: 9-Month Contract by Ketevan Vashagashvili
  - Special Mention: The Encampments by Michael T. Workman & Kei Pritsker
- NORDIC:DOX AWARD: Walls - Akinni Inuk by Nina Paninnguaq Skydsbjerg & Sofie Rørdam
  - Special Mention: The Nicest Men on Earth by Josefine Exner & Sebastian Gerdes
- NEXT:WAVE AWARD: Abode of Dawn by Kristina Shtubert
  - Special Mention: Who Witnessed the Temples Fall by Lucia Selva
- NEW:VISION: Ramallah, Palestine, December 2018 by Juliette Le Monnyer
  - Special Mention: Scrap by Noémie Lobry
- INTER:ACTIVE AWARD: Constantinopoliad by Sister Sylvester & Nadah El Shazly
  - Special Mention: The Garden Says... by Uri Kranot, Michelle Kranot, Sara Topsøe Jensen, Sarah John, Marieke Breyne
