= Angelo Soliman =

Afro-Austrian intellectual and freemason

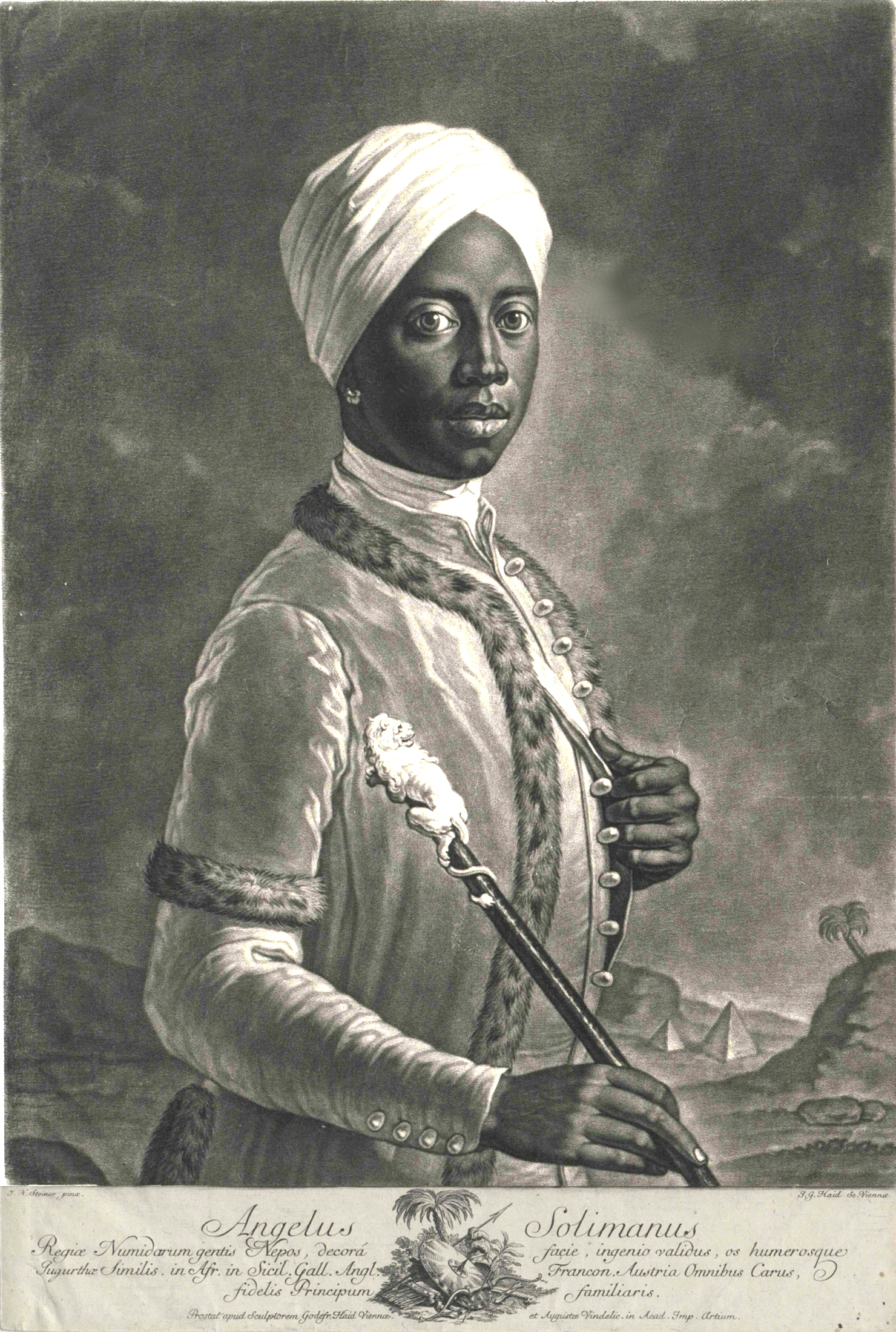
- Angelo Soliman in 1750

Grand Master of True Concord (Given name of Massinissa)

Personal details
- Born: Mmadi Make c. 1721 present day Nigeria or Cameroon
- Died: 21 November 1796 Vienna
- Spouse: Magdalena Christiani (née de Kellermann)
- Occupation: Freemason
- Nickname: Massinissa

Angelo Soliman, born Mmadi Make, (c. 1721 – 21 November 1796) was an African-born Austrian Freemason and courtier. He achieved prominence in Viennese society and Freemasonry.

== Life ==
His original name, Mmadi Make, is linked to a princely class of the Bornu Empire (centred in Borno State, modern-day Nigeria). His native language is unknown but it is often speculated to be either Kanuri or Wandala. He was said to have had an excellent memory of his youth and friends remembered many recollections he shared about the cultural practices of his people. When he was around the age of 7 he was captured in a slave raid by an enemy people, as a high-class member of his society his capture was considered a great triumph by the enemy and was celebrated. His captors traded him to a separate African nation in exchange for a horse, he would soon be embarked to a Spanish ship and arrived in Marseille as a slave.

He was sold into the household of a Messinan marchioness, who oversaw his education and conversion to Christianity. Out of affection for another servant in the household, Angelina, he adopted the name 'Angelo', and he chose to recognize September 11, his baptismal day, as his birthday. The origin of his last name is unknown. After repeated requests, he was given as a gift in 1734 to Prince Georg Christian, Prince von Lobkowitz, the imperial governor of Sicily. He became the Prince's valet and traveling companion, accompanying him on military campaigns throughout Europe and reportedly saving his life on one occasion, a pivotal event responsible for his social ascension. An early and unsourced biography claims he was offered command of a company but declined. After the death of Prince Lobkowitz, Soliman was taken into the Vienna household of Joseph Wenzel I, Prince of Liechtenstein, eventually rising to chief servant. Later, he became royal tutor of the heir to the Prince, Aloys I. On 6 February 1768, he married the noblewoman Magdalena Christiani, a young widow and sister of the French general François Christophe de Kellermann, Duke of Valmy, a marshal of Napoleon Bonaparte. He had a daughter named Josefine with her, his only child.

A cultured man, Soliman was highly respected in the intellectual circles of Vienna and counted as a valued friend by Austrian Emperor Joseph II and Count Franz Moritz von Lacy as well as Prince Gian Gastone de' Medici. Soliman attended the wedding of Emperor Joseph II and Princess Isabella of Parma as a guest of the Emperor. Aside from his native tongue, he spoke six languages: Latin, English, French, German, Italian and Czech. He is agreed to have spoken Italian, French, and German fluently, some modern sources state he could also speak the other three fluently. He was adept at Chess and Faro, however he avoided gambling. An anecdote states that he won 40,000 Florins in a game of Faro before then contriving a game to allow the loser to win the sum back. He at one point played against the Mechanical Turk.

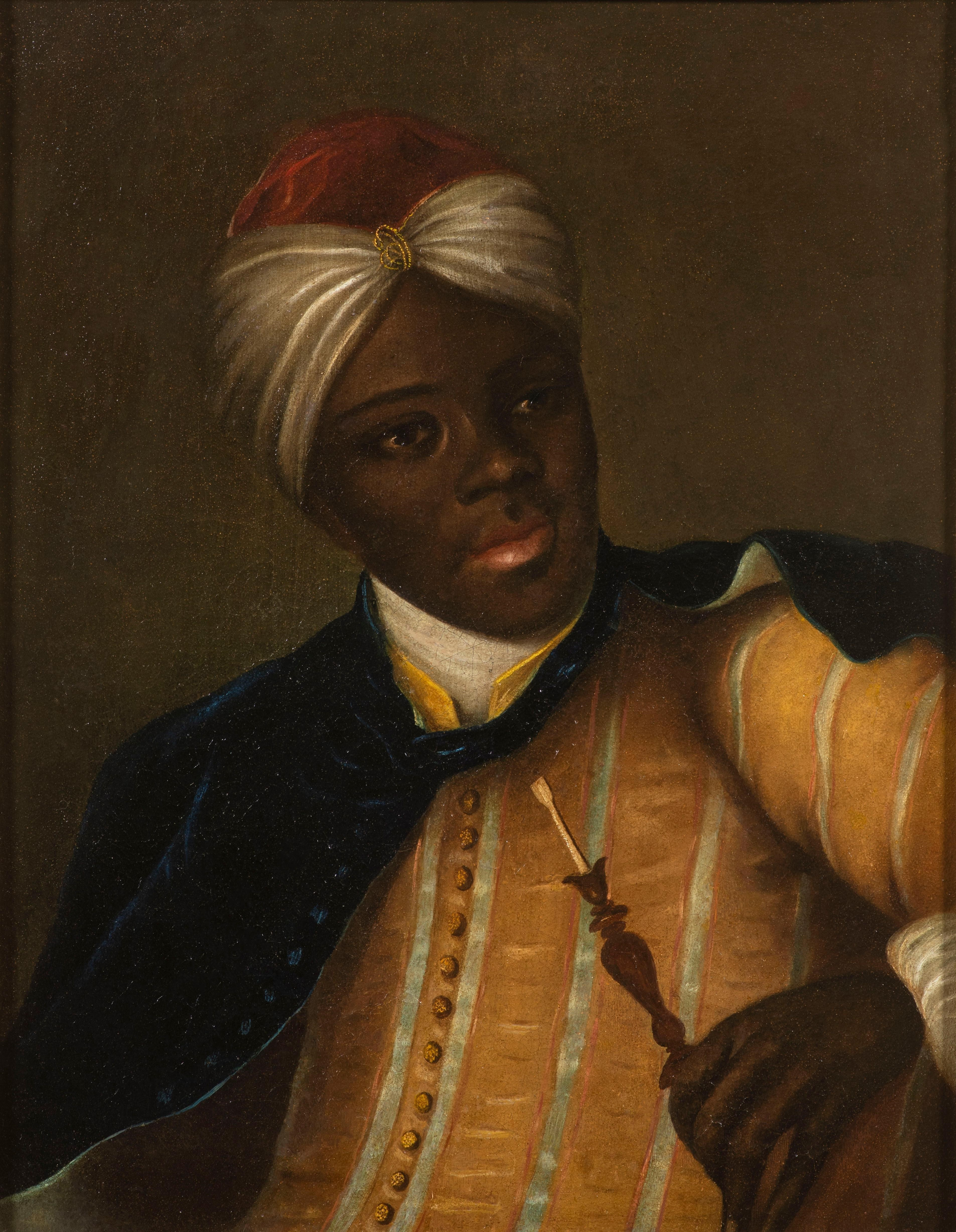
Portrait of Angelo Soliman holding an oboe, by an unknown contemporary German painter

In 1783, he joined the Masonic lodge "True Concord" (Zur Wahren Eintracht), whose membership included many of Vienna's influential artists and scholars of the time, among them the musicians Wolfgang Amadeus Mozart and Joseph Haydn as well the Hungarian poet Ferenc Kazinczy. Lodge records indicate that Soliman and Mozart met on several occasions. Eventually becoming the Grand Master of that lodge, Soliman helped change its ritual to include scholarly elements. This new Masonic direction rapidly influenced Freemasonic practice throughout Europe. Soliman used "Masinissa" as his masonic name, and he sometimes claimed to be a descendent of Numidians. Soliman is still celebrated in Masonic rites as "Father of Pure Masonic Thought", with his name usually transliterated as "Angelus Solimanus".

He usually wore Turkish dress, which was common for African courtiers in Europe at the time. After marrying his wife he moved with her to a small countryside house and bought shares of two cobalt mines. After the cobalt mines closed Soliman was put into debt and had his house seized, he and his family would move into the Palais Liechtenstein in Herrengasse. He would spend some of his free time in historical studies. After the death of his wife in 1786 he spent much of his time on his daughter's education.

At the end of his life, after the death of his European wife, the old man led an austere life that resembled very closely that of a practicing Muslim: “He no longer invited friends to dine with him. He never drank anything except water.” Angelo Solimann, his youth notwithstanding, had rebelled against conversion but then likely found it easier to accept with seeming sincerity, out of commodity or gratitude. Nevertheless, he seems to have gone back to his original faith in his old age, although his daughter and other contemporary people continued to believe Soliman was a Christian. He was noted for retaining a remarkably youthful appearance well into old age, it is said that individuals who had met him decades apart would assume he was a son of himself because of how little he seemed to age.

While walking down a street near to St. Stephen's Cathedral Soliman had a stroke and would die soon after of Apoplexy, he is believed to have been 75 years old at his death.

=== Mummification after death ===
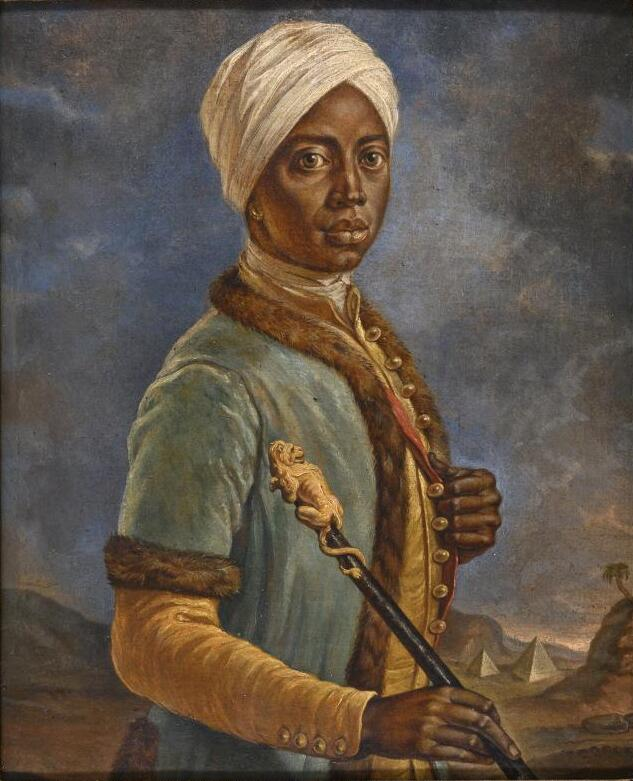
painting on canvas

Shortly after his death Soliman was taken to his home where a death mask of his face was made. His body was sent to the department of medicine at the University of Vienna for what was thought to be standard medical experimentation, when a coffin was returned, it was discovered to the horror of Soliman's family and friends that it contained only his internal organs.

Instead of receiving a Christian burial, Soliman was – at the request of the director of the recently formed Imperial Natural History Collection (Naturalienkabinette) – skinned, stuffed and made into an exhibit within their cabinet of curiosities. Decked out in ostrich feathers and glass beads, this mummy was on display until 1806 alongside stuffed animals, transformed from a reputable member of intellectual Viennese society into an exotic specimen alongside animals. Soliman's taxidermized corpse was displayed in a case in a section dedicated to South American wildlife and hidden by a curtain that would be removed by a guide at the end of tours. The display was controversial and greatly shocked those that knew Soliman, his daughter Josefine campaigned for its removal and gained the support of Arch-Bishop Migazzi, who viewed the taxidermy as barbaric. State authorities defended themselves and claimed that the action was not meant to degrade Soliman or his legacy and that he was chosen due to his physical beauty and form, the director of the Naturalienkabinette likewise claimed the scene was respectful and depicted him in a noble manner. Josefine would die in 1801 unsuccessful, however when Carl Franz Anton Ritter von Schreibers took over as director of the Naturalienkabinette in 1806 Soliman was removed from display and placed in storage under a Latin plaque reading "Vi nec e merito est Angelus inter bestias situs", which translates in English to "By coercion and not because he deserved it, Angelo was placed between wild animals".

By stripping Soliman of the insignia of his lifetime achievements, ethnologists instrumentalized him as what they imagined to be an exemplary African "savage". Some historians have suggested that Soliman may have planned for his body to be put on display, given that in his Masonic circle the idea of abolishing burial and using bodies for purely rationalistic reasons was present and his recorded interactions with various scientists, however this is rejected by most other historians. The treatment of his body was omitted in many early biographies of Soliman, conversely some modern biographies of him primarily focus on his treatment after death. During the October revolution of 1848, the mummy was destroyed when a mob set the warehouse containing it on fire. Soliman's death mask is still on display in the Rollett Museum in Baden bei Wien. His grandson was the Austrian writer Eduard von Feuchtersleben.

During his lifetime Soliman was regarded as a model to the "potential for assimilation" of Africans in Europe, but after his death his image was subject to defamation and vulgarization through scientific racism, and his body was physically rendered into a specimen, as if an animal or for experimentation. Wigger and Klein distinguish four aspects of Soliman – the "royal Moor", the "noble Moor", the "physiognomic Moor" and the "mummified Moor". The first two designations refer to the years prior to his death. The term "royal Moor" designates Soliman in the context of enslaved Moors at European courts, where their skin color marked their inferiority and they figured as status symbols betokening the power and wealth of their owners. Bereft of his ancestry and original culture, Soliman was degraded to an "exotic-oriental sign of his lord's standing" who was not allowed to live a self-determined existence. The designation "noble Moor" describes Soliman as a former court Moor whose ascent up the social ladder due to his marriage with an aristocratic woman made his emancipation possible. During this time Soliman became a member of the Freemasons and as lodge Grand Master was certainly considered equal to his fellow Masons even though he continued to face a thicket of race and class prejudices.

== In popular culture ==
- The unfinished novel The Man Without Qualities by Robert Musil, features an African servant boy character believed to be loosely based on Soliman
- In 2010, Blackamoor Angel, an opera with book and libretto by Carl Hancock Rux and music by Deidre Murray performed, in part, at Bard Spiegeltent and the Joseph Papp Public Theater under the direction of Karin Coonrod
- In 2018, Angelo, a movie biopic based on his life directed by Markus Schleinzer, was released.
- Flights by the Polish novelist Olga Tokarczuk includes three (presumably) fictional letters by Soliman's daughter Josefine to the Austrian Emperor Francis II.
- In 2014, the Hungarian writer Gergely Péterfy published the historical novel Kitömött barbár, translated into German in 2016 as Der ausgestopfte Barbar ("The stuffed barbarian"), based on the life of Ferenc Kazinczy, Soliman's friend, and his and his widow's quest to see the mummified body of Soliman in person.

In 2023, Orville Breeveld, a Dutch-Surinamese filmmaker and composer, working as a programmer at the Royal Concertgebouw in Amsterdam and also active as an arts consultant, made a documentary about Angelo Soliman as part of the NTR docuseries Nieuwe Blik Terug. In this episode, Breeveld highlights Soliman's extraordinary life as an African-born man who became a notable figure in 18th-century Vienna, while also addressing the racialised ways in which his legacy was later treated in European history.

== See also ==
- Negro of Banyoles, a San individual taxidermied after death in Spain
