= Sanatorium (film) =

- Theatrical release poster
- Directed by: Gar O'Rourke
- Produced by: Andrew Freedman; Ken Wardrop; Samantha Corr
- Cinematography: Denys Melnyk
- Edited by: John Murphy
- Music by: Denis Kilty
- Production companies: Venom Films; BBC Storyville; 2332 Films Ukraine; Petite Maison Production France; MetFilm Sales
- Distributed by: Eclipse Pictures (Ireland); MetFilm Sales (World-wide)
- Release dates: March 24, 2025 (CPH:DOX); September 5, 2025 (Ireland)
- Running time: 90 minutes
- Countries: Ireland; Ukraine; France
- Language: Ukrainian

Sanatorium (Ukrainian: Санаторій, romanized: Sanatoriy) is a 2025 observational documentary film directed by Gar O'Rourke in his directorial debut. It follows the lives of the residents of Kuyalnik Sanatorium, a former Soviet medical center that now provides medical treatment and comfort to its guests while the Russian war against Ukraine rages.

O'Rourke first visited Kyiv in 2018 for another film project and stayed at a Ukrainian sanatorium in 2021, before war broke out, to obtain first-hand experience.

It was selected as the Irish entry for the Best International Feature Film at the 98th Academy Awards, but it was not nominated.

== Synopsis ==
Just outside Odesa in southern Ukraine is the Kuyalnik Sanatorium, an imposing brutalist structure built in the Soviet era and now in a poor state of repair. The film, shot over a summer season, shows the lives of both the sanatorium staff and residents, who receive medical treatment and take part in social activities. There are frequent reminders of the Russo-Ukrainian War, including its impact on individuals, and guests moving to the basement on fears of airstrikes on nearby Odesa.

== Release ==
Sanatorium had its world premiere on March 24, 2025, at the 22nd Copenhagen International Documentary Film Festival, then screened on April 3, 2025, at the 56th Visions du Réel, on June 6, 2025, at the 22nd DocuDays UA.

The film was commercially released on September 5, 2025, in Irish theaters by Eclipse Pictures.

== Reception ==
=== Critical response ===
The film received positive reviews.

Gemma Creagh in Film Ireland commented that "The heart of this film lies in its warmth, grounded in the minutiae of routine. Gar has built a deep rapport with each of these subjects. This space of trust allows not only for authenticity, but for a surprising helping of humour". Wendy Ide in Screen International saw it as a "strikingly cinematic, affectionately droll study of Ukrainian resilience in the face of war ... it captures the rhythms of life ... and sense of dislocation in this concrete time capsule from a past era."

=== Accolades ===
| Year | Award / Festival | Category | Recipient | Result | Ref. |
|---|---|---|---|---|---|
| 2025 | 22nd Copenhagen International Documentary Film Festival | DOX:AWARD | Sanatorium | Nominated | |
| 2025 | 56th Visions du Réel | Grand Angle Award | Sanatorium | Nominated | |
| 2025 | 65th Kraków Film Festival | Golden Horn | Sanatorium | Nominated | |
| 2025 | 65th Kraków Film Festival | Student Jury Award | Sanatorium | Won | |

== See also ==
- List of Irish submissions for the Academy Award for Best International Feature Film
- List of submissions to the 98th Academy Awards for Best International Feature Film
