= The Ground Beneath Our Feet =

2025 documentary film

- International promotional poster
- Icelandic: Jörðin undir fótum okkar
- Directed by: Yrsa Roca Fannberg
- Screenplay by: Yrsa Roca Fannberg; Elín Agla Briem
- Produced by: Hanna Björk Valsdóttir
- Cinematography: Wojciech Staron
- Edited by: Federico Delpero Bejar
- Music by: Skúli Sverrisson
- Production companies: Akkeri Films; Staron Film
- Release dates: 25 March 2025 (CPH:DOX); 2 October 2025 (Iceland)
- Running time: 82 minutes
- Countries: Iceland; Poland
- Language: Icelandic

The Ground Beneath Our Feet (Icelandic: Jörðin undir fótum okkar) is a 2025 documentary film written and directed by Yrsa Roca Fannberg. A co-production of Iceland and Poland, it follows the everyday life of the Grund nursing home and the people who live there.

The film had its world premiere in the NORDIC:DOX section of the CPH:DOX 2025 on 25 March. It was theatrically released in Iceland on 2 October. It was also selected as the Icelandic entry for Best International Feature Film at the 99th Academy Awards.

== Contents ==
16mm film shots

The documentary is set in Grund nursing home in Reykjavík, Iceland, where it observes the daily lives of elderly residents over the changing seasons. Shot on 16 mm film, the documentary uses the texture and grain of celluloid to create an intimate visual style. Its warm images of aging bodies, changing light, and Icelandic landscapes accompany the residents through their daily routines.

Sunset of life

The film presents old age not simply as a period of decline or anticipation of death, but as an active and present stage of life. When a resident asks why the film is being made, the answer is simply, "life." Through its quiet observation of everyday existence, the documentary reflects on aging, community, and the universal passage of time.

Ordinary activities and interactions

Rather than focusing on a single person or a major event, the film presents a series of quiet, everyday moments that reveal the residents' personalities, relationships, routines, and physical abilities.

The film shows ordinary activities and interactions, including residents listening to music in bed, arranging their rooms and flowers, caring for one another, moving to music from their wheelchairs, and welcoming a resident who returns to the dining room after a long absence. These scenes portray old age as a diverse and shared human experience, shaped by individual character, companionship, and changing physical circumstances.

== Production ==
The film was shot on 16 mm film. It was supported by The Icelandic Film Center, The Polish Film Fund, RÚV, YLE, Nordisk Film & TV Fund, and Eurimages.

== Release ==
The Ground Beneath Our Feet had its world premiere at CPH:DOX 2025 on 25 March 2025, where it competed in the NORDIC:DOX. Subsequently on 8 May 2025 it was screened at DOK.fest München for its German premiere. The film competed in International Competition at the DMZ International Documentary Film Festival in September 2025, where it had its Asian Premiere and won the Grand Prize. It was screened at the Zurich Film Festival on 28 September 2025, where it received special mention.

The film had its Icelandic Premiere on 2 October 2025 at the Reykjavik International Film Festival in Vitranir, New Visions. On 14 October, it had Special Screening at the Warsaw Film Festival. The film was screened in 'Open Horizons' at the Thessaloniki Documentary Festival on 5 March 2026.

== Reception ==
In June 2026 Edda Awards, it won the 'Documentary of the Year award', the Iceland's honours for its best in film and television.

== Accolades ==
Award	Date	Category	Recipient	Result	Ref.
CPH:DOX	30 March 2025	Nordic Dox award	Ground Beneath Our Feet	Nominated	
DMZ International Documentary Film Festival	18 September 2025	Grand Prize	Ground Beneath Our Feet	Won	
Zurich Film Festival	5 October 2025	Documentary Film Competition	Ground Beneath Our Feet	Special Mentions	
Tromsø International Film Festival	25 January 2026	Tromsø Palm for Best Feature Film	Ground Beneath Our Feet	Won	
Hong Kong International Film Festival	12 April 2026	Firebird Awards Documentary Competition	Ground Beneath Our Feet	Jury Prize	
Edda Awards	1 June 2026	Documentary of the Year	Ground Beneath Our Feet	Won	

== See also ==
- List of submissions to the 99th Academy Awards for Best International Feature Film
- List of Icelandic submissions for the Academy Award for Best International Feature Film
