= Li Cheuk-to =

Hong Kong film curator and critic

- 李焯桃
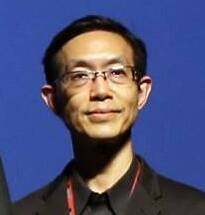
- Li in April 2017
- Born: Li Cheuk-to; Hong Kong
- Occupations: Curator; Film Critic
- Years active: 1983–present

Li Cheuk-to (Chinese: 李焯桃) is a Hong Kong film curator and critic. He has served as the chief editor of Hong Kong's first film publication City Entertainment Magazine in the 1980s, as the artistic director of the Hong Kong International Film Festival from 2004 to 2018, and as the founding chairman of the Hong Kong Film Critics Society. He is currently the film curator of M+.

== Biography ==
Li joined City Entertainment Magazine, Hong Kong's first film publication, in the 1980s, and eventually became its chief editor. He also worked as a programmer for the Hong Kong International Film Festival (HKIFF) since 1983, curating the Hong Kong Cinema Retrospective section. Li was among the Hong Kong film critics who signed Edward Yang's Taiwan Film Manifesto, which marked the beginning of the Taiwan New Cinema. After leaving the magazine, Li co-founded the Hong Kong Film Critics Society in 1995, serving as its founding chairman. As HKIFF shifted its focus to international cinema rather than solely Chinese-language films, Li took on a larger role, becoming the general manager in 2001 and then the artistic director in 2004. The festival transitioned from a government-organized event to a private initiative during Li's tenure as general manager, which he cited as a need to "break from bureaucratic straitjackets", and he introduced the Hong Kong-Asia Film Financing Forum and the Asian Film Awards during his time as artistic director. In 2001, he translated American film theorist David Bordwell's Planet Hong Kong: Popular Cinema and the Art of Entertainment into Chinese, after the two had befriended each other in 1995 during Bordwell's visit to the HKIFF. Li also served on the jury for the 48th Berlin International Film Festival in 1998, and the 39th Golden Horse Awards in 2002.

Starting in 2007, Li introduced the Romanian New Wave to the HKIFF, including dedicated sections for Romanian films in 2007, 2011, and 2017. He recognized the potential of Romania's new cinema following 4 Months, 3 Weeks and 2 Days (2007), and Screen International noted his contributions to Romanian cinema "before it was widely recognized by other festivals". In 2008, on the first anniversary of Edward Yang's passing, Li dedicated the HKIFF edition as a memorial to Yang and edited a collection of film critiques titled The One and Only Edward Yang. In 2011, he participated in the Golden Horse Film Festival Society's selection of the Best 100 Chinese-language films, where he chose Yang's A Brighter Summer Day. In April 2018, Li stepped down from his position at the HKIFF after the 42nd edition, announcing he would continue working as a freelancer due to approaching retirement age. In 2020, he edited and published Echoes of Cinematic Dreams: The Surviving Records of Wong Ain-ling, an essay collection about the works of film scholar Wong Ain-ling. Li began serving as the film curator for the newly founded M+ museum in 2022.

== Bibliography ==
Year	Title	Original title	Publisher	Ref.
1990	Notes on Hong Kong Films in the 1980s	八十年代香港電影筆記	Chongkin Books	
1993	Anatomy of Criticism	觀逆集	Subculture Publishing House	
1996	Vivid Images	淋漓影像館	Subculture Publishing House	
2001	Planet Hong Kong: Popular Cinema and the Art of Entertainment	香港電影王國：娛樂的藝術	Hong Kong Film Critics Society	
2020	Echoes of Cinematic Dreams: The Surviving Records of Wong Ain-ling	戲夢餘音：黃愛玲電影文存	KUBRICK	
