= Angelo (film) =

2018 Austrian historical drama film

- Film poster
- Directed by: Markus Schleinzer
- Written by: Alexander Brom; Markus Schleinzer
- Produced by: Alexander Dumreicher-Ivanceanu; Bady Minck; Franz Novotny; Markus Schleinzer
- Starring: Makita Samba; Alba Rohrwacher
- Cinematography: Gerald Kerkletz
- Edited by: Pia Dumont
- Production companies: Novotny & Novotny
- Distributed by: Filmladen; Grandfilm
- Release date: 8 September 2018 (TIFF)
- Running time: 111 minutes
- Countries: Austria; Luxembourg
- Languages: German; French

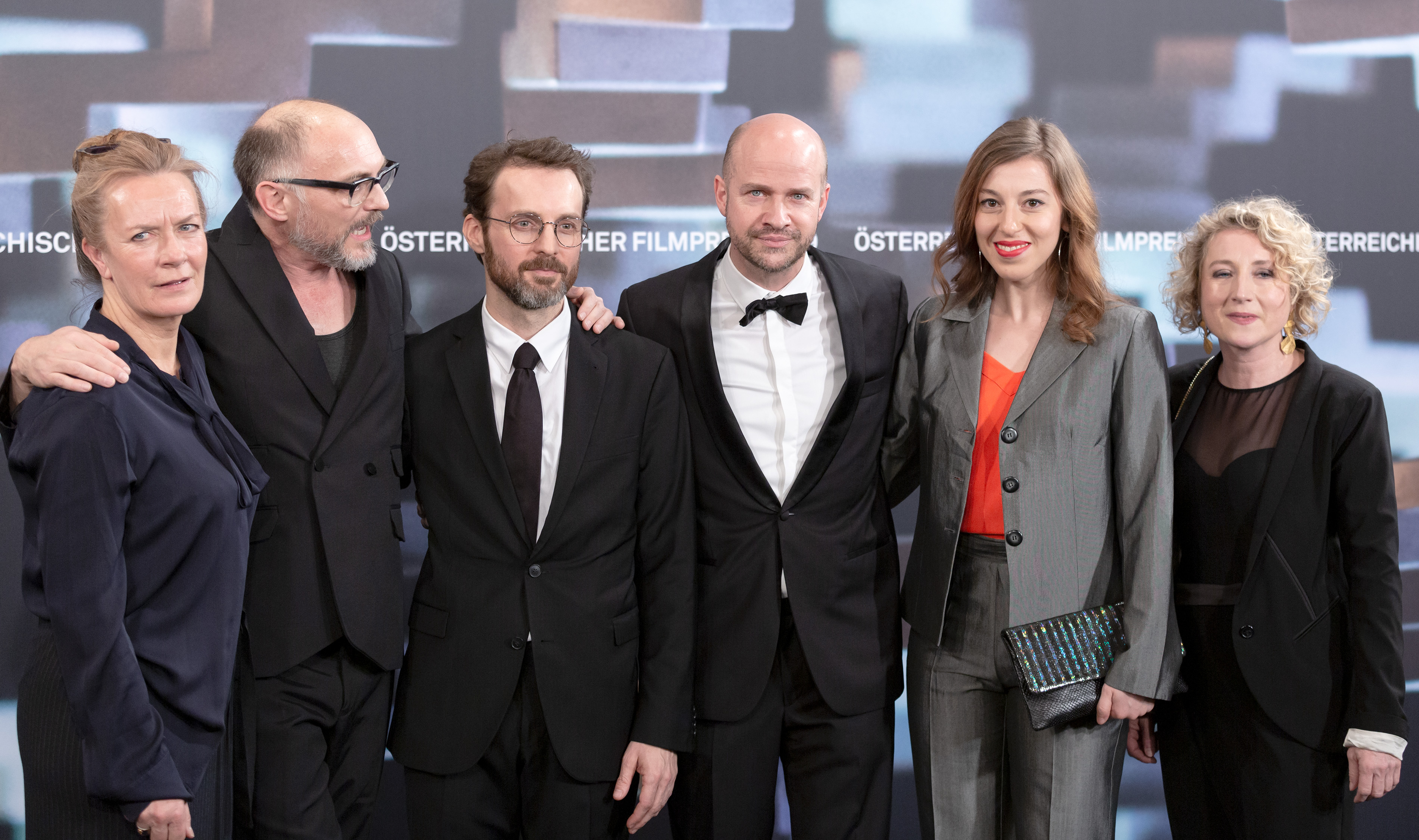
Members of the filmteam of "Angelo", l.t.r.: Anette Keiser (make-up artist), Markus Schleinzer (script and director), Gerald Kerkletz (cinematography), Lukas Miko (actor), Larisa Faber (actress) and Tanja Hausner (costume design), photo call at the Austrian Film Awards 2019 (Rathaus, Vienna, Austria).

Angelo is an Austrian-Luxembourgian drama film, directed by Markus Schleinzer and released in 2018. The film is a biographical drama about the life of Angelo Soliman, an African-born man who was brought to Austria in childhood as a slave in the early 18th century, but rose to become a prominent figure in Viennese society in adulthood.

The film stars Makita Samba as Angelo and Alba Rohrwacher as the countess who first educates him in the ways of high society, as well as Larisa Faber, Lukas Miko, Gerti Drassl, Michael Rotschopf, Nancy Mensah-Offei, Martine Schambacher, Marisa Growaldt, Christian Friedel, Anne Klein, Gérard Klamm, Nilton Martins and Pierre Bodry in supporting roles.

The film premiered in the Platform Prize program at the 2018 Toronto International Film Festival.
