= Walls - Akinni Inuk =

2025 Greenlandic documentary film

- Film poster
- Directed by: Sofie Rørdam; Nina Paninnguaq Skydsbjerg
- Produced by: Emile Hertling Péronard
- Starring: Ruth Mikaelsen Jerimiassen
- Cinematography: Anders Berthelsen; Inuk Silis Hoegh; Sofie Rørdam
- Edited by: Biel Andrés; Nanna Frank Møller
- Music by: Gustav Lynge Petrussen
- Production company: Anorak Film
- Release date: 21 March 2025 (CPH:DOX)
- Running time: 105 minutes
- Country: Greenland
- Language: Greenlandic

Walls - Akinni Inuk is a 2025 Greenlandic documentary film directed by Sofie Rørdam and Nina Paninnguaq Skydsbjerg. The film is a portrait of Ruth Mikaelsen Jerimiassen, a woman who has been indefinitely incarcerated in Nuuk for attempted murder, who is given an opportunity for redemption when her case is opened for review.

The film was selected as Greenland's submission for the Nordic Council Film Prize, and for the Academy Award for Best International Feature Film at the 98th Academy Awards, but it was not nominated.

== Synopsis ==
The documentary follows Ruth Mikaelsen Jerimiassen, a Greenlandic woman held at a correctional institution in Nuuk under an indeterminate sentence following a violent offence. With no fixed release date, Ruth remains uncertain whether she will be considered ready to return to society.

The film originated as a project in which incarcerated women were given cameras to document their everyday lives. After prison authorities discontinued the arrangement, filmmaker Nina Paninnguaq Skydsbjerg continued meeting with Ruth and became personally involved in her story. Their conversations reveal comparable experiences of childhood hardship, grief and emotional isolation, changing their relationship from that of filmmaker and subject into a close friendship.

Over several years, the documentary records Ruth’s attempts to address her past and seek reconsideration of her confinement. At the same time, Nina confronts unresolved experiences from her own life. Their developing connection provides the film with a broader examination of punishment, rehabilitation and the possibility of rebuilding a life after trauma.

== Release ==
The film premiered at the CPH:DOX documentary film festival, where it was named the winner of the Nordic Dox award. It had its North American premiere in April at the Hot Docs Canadian International Documentary Festival.

== Accolades ==
Award	Date	Category	Recipient	Result	Ref.
CPH:DOX	30 March 2025	Nordic Dox award	Walls - Akinni Inuk	Won	

== See also ==
- List of Greenlandic submissions for the Academy Award for Best International Feature Film
- List of submissions to the 98th Academy Awards for Best International Feature Film
