= Rose (2026 film) =

2026 drama film by Markus Schleinzer

- Austrian theatrical release poster
- Directed by: Markus Schleinzer
- Written by: Markus Schleinzer; Alexander Brom
- Produced by: Johannes Schubert; Philipp Worm; Tobias Walker; Karsten Stöter
- Starring: Sandra Hüller; Caro Braun; Marisa Growaldt; Godehard Giese; Robert Gwisdek
- Narrated by: Marisa Growaldt
- Cinematography: Gerald Kerkletz
- Edited by: Hansjörg Weißbrich
- Music by: Tara Nome Doyle
- Production companies: Schubert; ROW Pictures; Walker & Worm Film
- Distributed by: Filmladen (Austria); Piffl Medien (Germany)
- Release dates: 15 February 2026 (Berlinale); 17 April 2026 (Austria); 30 April 2026 (Germany)
- Running time: 94 minutes
- Countries: Austria; Germany
- Language: German
- Box office: $681,546

Rose is a 2026 drama film directed by Markus Schleinzer, co-written with Alexander Brom. Set in the 17th century, it follows mysterious soldier Rose (Sandra Hüller), a woman disguised as a man, who appears in a secluded Protestant village. She declares herself the heir of a long-abandoned farmstead and produces a document to support her claim to the suspicious villagers.

The film had its world premiere at the main competition of the 76th Berlin International Film Festival on 15 February 2026, where it received critical acclaim and won the Silver Bear for Best Leading Performance for Hüller. It was theatrically released in Austria on 17 April by Filmladen Filmverleih, and in Germany on 30 April by Piffl Medien.

It was selected as the Austrian entry for Best International Feature Film at the 99th Academy Awards.

== Plot ==
At the end of the Thirty Years' War, a former soldier arrives in a remote Protestant village and lays claim to a neglected estate as its long-missing heir. Unbeknownst to the villagers, the soldier is in fact Rose, a woman who has been posing as a man for years and has assumed the identity of a fellow soldier killed during the war.

Rose works tirelessly to rebuild the farm and gradually earns the respect of the community. Her reputation grows when she shoots dead a bear, saving the life of a villager in the process. Desiring to expand, Rose offers to purchase a patch of land by a stream from a prominent local farmer. The farmer, unwilling to sell, grants her access to the land on the condition that she marries his eldest daughter, Suzanna, to which Rose agrees. Rose's unwillingness to consummate the marriage upsets both Suzanna and her father. She later resorts to using a makeshift strap-on dildo without Suzanna's knowledge, and is surprised when Suzanna announces her pregnancy.

While the birth of a child appears to secure the family's future, an accident occurs one summer when Rose is badly stung while beekeeping, leaving her bed-bound for an extended period. When checking her body for injuries, Suzanna and a maid discover that Rose is a woman. Rose reveals the truth of her life to Suzanna, who, out of genuine care for Rose and unwilling to give up her own newfound freedom, elects to maintain the appearance of a marriage. The maid on the other hand informs the villagers, leading to a confrontation at Rose's farmhouse. The two women are forced to flee with the child but are quickly apprehended.

A bailiff is dispatched to the village to conduct an investigation, during which Rose defends her desire for freedom to no avail. Suzanna is ultimately sentenced to death by drowning for fraud and adultery. Rose is sentenced to death by beheading, though her execution is postponed until she could give birth following her rape by four men. During the reprieve, Rose decides to write down her own life story.

== Cast ==
- Sandra Hüller as Rose
- Caro Braun as Suzanna
- Marisa Growaldt as narrator (voice)
- Godehard Giese as large-scale farmer
- Robert Gwisdek as bailiff
- Augustino Renken as old servant
- Maria-Victoria Dragus as large-scale farmer
- Sven-Eric Bechtolf as judge
- Rainer Egger as doctor
- Maurice Leonhard as young servant

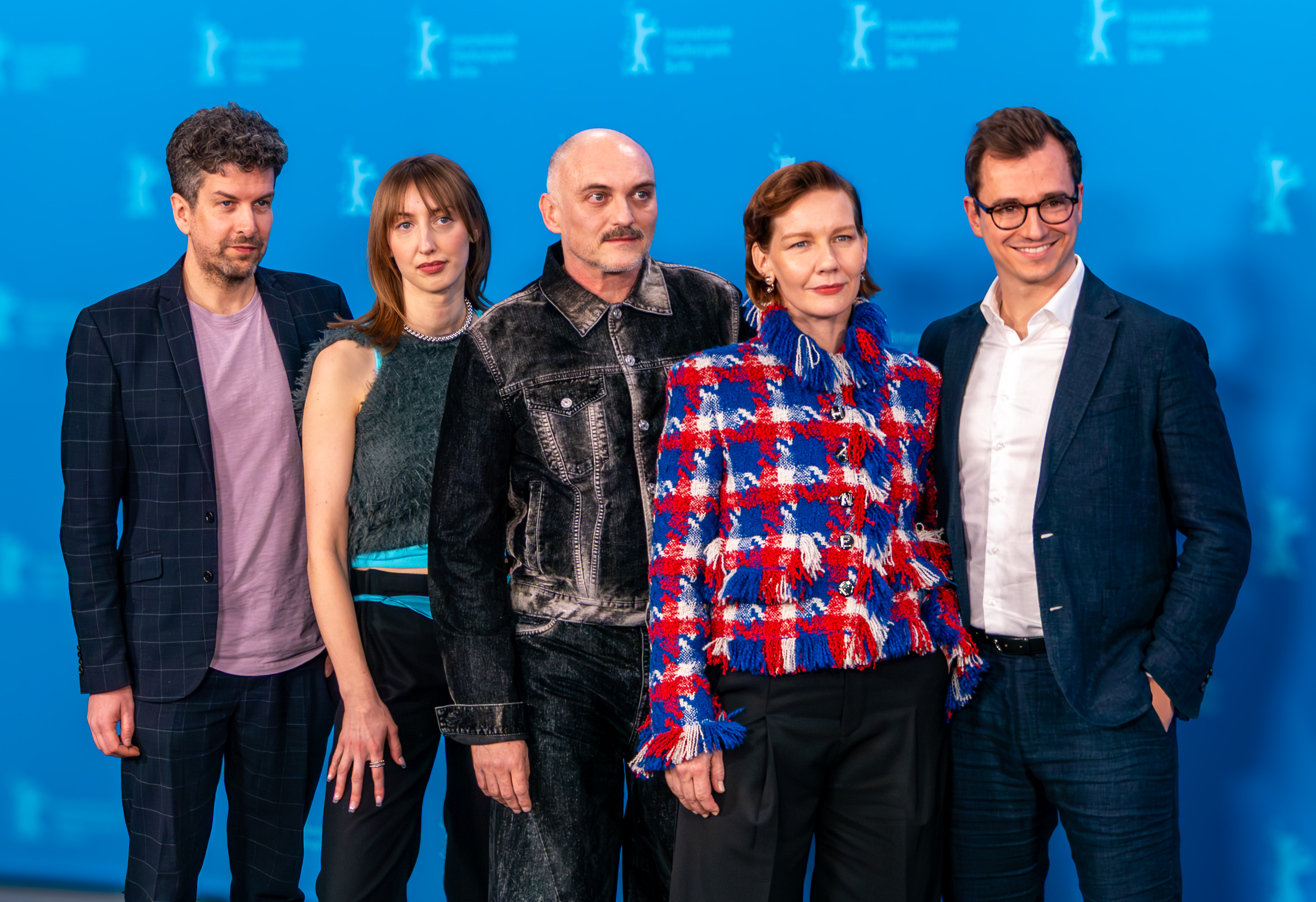
Cast and crew at the 76th Berlin International Film Festival

== Production ==
The film is an international co-production between Austria and Germany. Principal photography began on 7 May 2024 on locations in the Glasebach Valley in the Harz district of Saxony-Anhalt. Filming ended on 13 December 2024 in the locations at Austria – Lower Austria, Germany – Saxony-Anhalt.

The lead character of Rose played by Sandra Hüller, is inspired by numerous documented accounts of women disguised as men throughout European history.

In February 2025, it was reported that the film produced by Schubert, ROW Pictures and Walker + Worm Film was in the advanced post-production stage.

== Release ==
Rose had its world premiere on 15 February 2026, as part of the 76th Berlin International Film Festival, in Competition. It is set to compete for the Firebird Award at the 50th Hong Kong International Film Festival in April 2026. The film was released in the German theatres on 30 April 2026 by Piffl Medien, and in the Austrian cinemas on 17 April by Filmladen Filmverleih. The film was also part of 73rd Sydney Film Festival Special Presentations, it was screened on 5 June 2026 and also in the Horizons section of the 60th Karlovy Vary International Film Festival, where it was screened from 3 July to 9 July 2026. On 7 August 2026, it was screened in the Melbourne International Film Festival in Headliners Strand, and on 15 August in Focus section at the 32nd Sarajevo Film Festival, and at the Norwegian International Film Festival in Main Programme section on 23 August 2026. A week later on 31 August, it was screened in Portraits section of the New Zealand International Film Festival.

It had its North American premiere at the 53rd Telluride Film Festival in September. It is set to screen for its Belgian premiere on 8 September 2026 at the Brussels International Film Festival in 2026 International Competition. The film also had its New York Premiere in 'Main Slate' at the 2026 New York Film Festival on 26 September 2026. It was screened in the World Panorama section of the Rio de Janeiro International Film Festival on 1 October 2026. On 5 October 2026, it was presented in Galas and special presentations at the 2026 Vancouver International Film Festival. It was selected in the World Cinema section of the 31st Busan International Film Festival, and in the Main Slate of Mill Valley Film Festival for screening on 8 October 2026.

It was also showcased in 'The Essentials' section of the 2026 Festival du nouveau cinéma on 10 October, and in the 'Dare' section of the 2026 BFI London Film Festival on 13 October 2026.

It was screened in Spotlight section at the 62nd Chicago International Film Festival on 16 October 2026,, at the Middleburg Film Festival in Virginia on 16 October 2026, and in the Zeitgeist Deutschland section of the 13th Riga International Film Festival on 17 October 2026. It was also selected in the 'Official Section' slate of the 71st Valladolid International Film Festival (for its Spain premiere on 24 October). It will be presented in the Special Presentation of the 2026 Savannah Film Festival on 26 October, and on 31 October, it will be screened at the Miami Film Festival GEMS.

Continuing its festival run it will be screened in the Open Zone section of the 2026 Stockholm International Film Festival on 13 November 2026 and vie for FIPRESCI award.

The Match Factory acquired the sales rights of the film in 2023. In March 2026, its parent Mubi acquired distribution rights to the film in North and Latin America, the U.K., Ireland, Australia, New Zealand, Italy and Turkey. Avalon acquired Spanish theatrical distribution rights, programming a 20 November 2026 release.

It will be released by Mubi in the United States on 11 December 2026.

== Reception ==
=== Critical response ===
On the review aggregator Rotten Tomatoes website, the film has an approval rating of 97% based on 36 reviews, with an average rating of 8/10. On Metacritic, the film has a weighted average score of 88 out of 100, based on 14 critics, indicating "universal acclaim".

=== Accolades ===
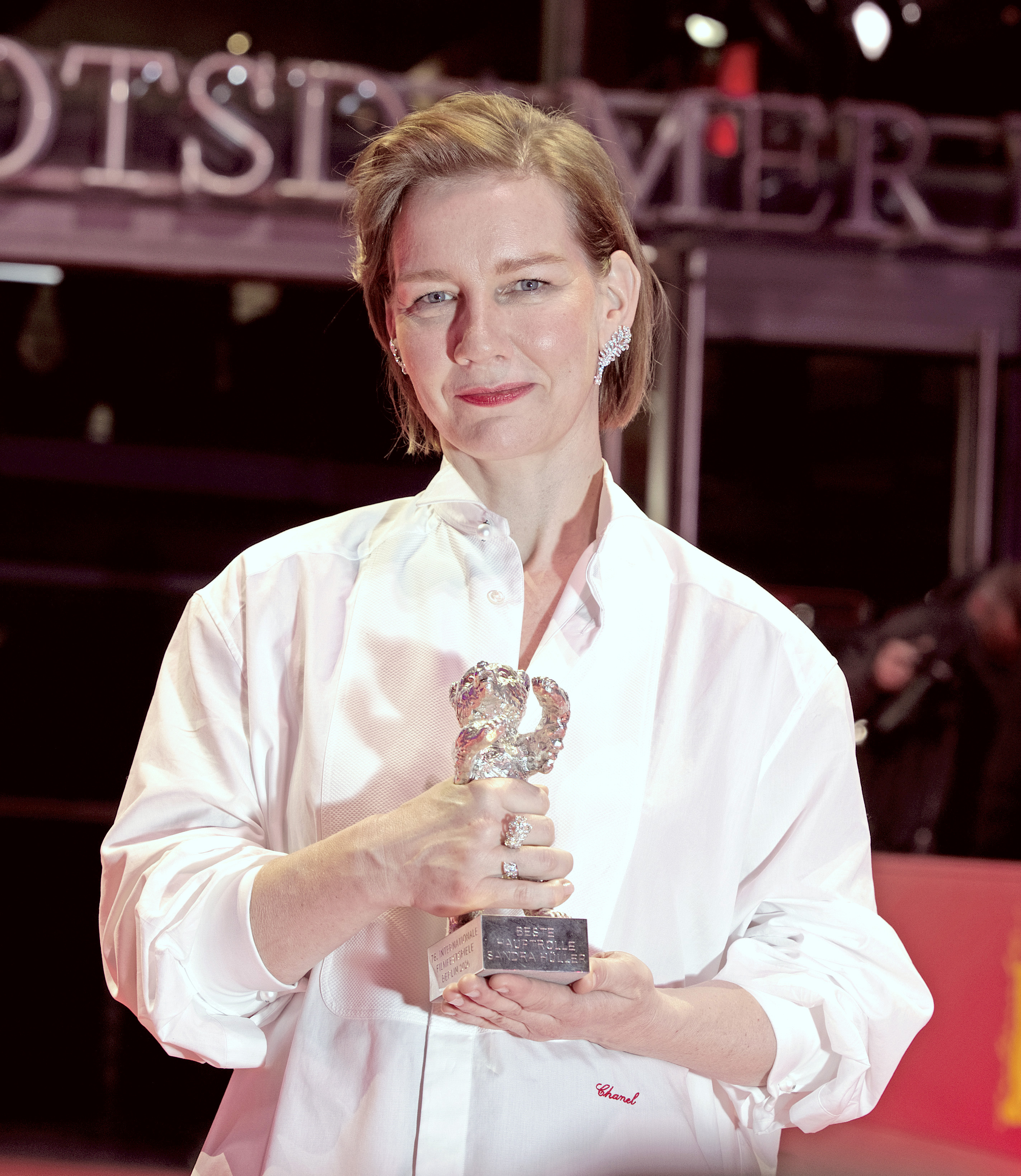
Sandra Hüller with Silver Bear for Best Leading Performance at Berlinale

The film was shortlisted for nominations at the 39th European Film Awards in the Feature Film category.

Award	Date of ceremony	Category	Recipient	Result	Ref.
Berlin International Film Festival	20 February 2026	Teddy Award	Markus Schleinzer	Nominated	
Berlin International Film Festival	22 February 2026	Golden Bear	Rose	Nominated	
Berlin International Film Festival	22 February 2026	Silver Bear for Best Leading Performance	Sandra Hüller	Won	
Diagonale Film Festival	23 March 2026	Thomas Pluch Screenwriting Award - Best Screenplay	Markus Schleinzer & Alexander Brom	Won	
Diagonale Film Festival	23 March 2026	Best Film Score	Tara Nome Doyle	Won	
Hong Kong International Film Festival	11 April 2026	Firebird Award (World)	Rose	Won	
International Istanbul Film Festival	17 April 2026	Golden Tulip	Rose	Nominated	
International Istanbul Film Festival	17 April 2026	Best Screenplay	Markus Schleinzer & Alexander Brom	Won	
Brussels International Film Festival	12 September 2026	Jury Prize	Rose	Won	
Valladolid International Film Festival	31 October 2026	Audience Award – Official Section	Rose	Won	
European Film Awards	16 January 2027	Best European Actress	Sandra Hüller	Pending	
European Film Awards	16 January 2027	Best European Composer	Tara Nome Doyle	Pending	
European Film Awards	16 January 2027	Best European Costume Designer	Doris Bartelt	Pending	
European Film Awards	16 January 2027	Best Production Designer	Olivier Meidinger	Pending	

== See also ==
- List of submissions to the 99th Academy Awards for Best International Feature Film
- List of Austrian submissions for the Academy Award for Best International Feature Film
- Wartime cross-dressers
- Cross-dressing in film and television
