= Sissel Dargis Morell =

- Born: Copenhagen
- Occupations: Filmmaker, artist, game director

Sissel Dargis Morell is a Danish filmmaker, artist, and photographer.

== Biography ==
Sissel Dargis Morell was born in Copenhagen to Lithuanian/Spanish parents.

She moved to Brazil when she was 19. There, she co-founded a cultural exchange project for favela locals and outsiders. Currently, the project remains active in Rocinha, the largest favela of Latin America. In São Paulo, she worked as a photographer and emerged as a graffiti artist.

Later she studied documentary film on Cuba at the EICTV International Film and TV School and graduated in 2017. After that, she enrolled at the National Film School of Denmark to study Games and Animation, graduating in 2021. There she developed Cai Cai Balão, an indie game that was exhibited at the Smithsonian Arts Museum and nominated for several awards, including Independent Games Festival, as well as winning the Games for Change Latinamerica prize.

Her 2017 short Plastic (Plástico) won the Tënk Award 2017 and the Opening Scenes Award at Visions du Réel.

Her 2024 film Balomanía, set deep in the Brazilian favelas, is a story about baloeiros, a secret society of giant hot air balloon makers chased by the police. The movie premiered at the CPH:DOX 2025 and was selected for numerous important film festivals, including Visions du Réel in Nyon. The film won the City of Malmö's Audience Award. In March 2024, the film was acquired by New York-based doc specialist Cargo Film & Releasing.

== Selected works ==
=== Game developer ===
- Cai Cai Balão (2020)

=== Film director ===
- Plástico (2017);
- Balomanía (2024).
