= The Lions by the River Tigris =

2025 documentary film

- Film poster
- Directed by: Zaradasht Ahmed
- Written by: Zaradasht Ahmed
- Produced by: Thorvald Nilsen; Harmen Jalvingh; Hester Breunissen
- Cinematography: Zaradasht Ahmed
- Edited by: Eva Hillström
- Music by: Daan Hofman
- Production company: Indie Film Bergen AS
- Distributed by: Illumina Films
- Release date: 2025
- Running time: 90 minutes
- Country: Norway / Iraq / Netherlands
- Language: Arabic

The Lions by the River Tigris is a 2025 feature documentary film written and directed by Zaradasht Ahmed. Produced by Thorvald Nilsen, Harmen Jalvingh & Hester Breunissen, the film follows three residents of Mosul, Iraq, as they attempt to restore their lives and cultural heritage after the city's occupation by the Islamic State. It is a co-production between Norway and the Netherlands.

== Plot ==
Set in Mosul after the city's devastation during the ISIS occupation (2014–2017), The Lions by the River Tigris follows three residents whose lives intersect around questions of memory, culture, and resilience.

Bashar, a fisherman, seeks to protect the ruins of his family home, which still features a marble doorframe carved with lions. Fakhri, a former soldier and collector of Iraqi artefacts, covets the doorframe as part of his mission to preserve cultural history, leading to an extended negotiation between the two men. Their dispute is complicated by Fakhri's friendship with Fadel, a fiddler who vowed to restore music to Mosul after years of prohibition under ISIS.

The film documents Bashar's efforts to guard his ruined neighborhood from looters, Fakhri's meticulous attempts to save artefacts, and Fadel's musical performances among the ruins. At its center is the contested lion-carved doorframe, which becomes a symbol of both stubbornness and cultural survival.

== Production ==
The project developed after filmmaker Zaradasht Ahmed travelled to Mosul and encountered the future subjects of the documentary, Bashar, Fakhri, and Fadel. The story began with Bashar and his ruined family home, and later expanded to include Fakhri's passion for collecting artefacts and Fadel's determination to revive music in the city.

The documentary was produced entirely with European funding, including multiple grants from the Norwegian Film Institute awarded between 2021 and 2025 to production companies Indie Film Bergen AS and Screen Story Film og TV AS. A local company in Iraq contributed archival material and was credited as a co-producer.

== Release ==
The Lions by the River Tigris held its world premiere in the Human Rights Competition at CPH:DOX. It later had its Asia Pacific premiere at the Doc Edge Festival, where it was selected to screen in the Facing the Edge category.

The film received an Honorable Mention in the Regional Competition at the Golden Apricot Film Festival. It went on to have its Norwegian premiere at Arabiske Filmdager Oslo, and its Dutch premiere at The Architecture Film Festival Rotterdam (AFFR).

== Critical reception ==
Writing for Cineuropa, David Katz called the film an "emotive documentary," praising Ahmed's character-driven approach and cinematography, which he said conveys Mosul's trauma and resilience without over-exposition.

Amber Wilkinson of Eye for Film noted that the film conveys the impact of war without relying on combat footage, balancing depictions of destruction with signs of rebuilding in Mosul. She observed that the carved lions serve as a symbol of both resilience and loss.

In FIPRESCI, Bartosz Zurawiecki wrote that while the film depicts destruction and loss, it is also "filled with hope," showing everyday efforts to rebuild life in Mosul. He highlighted the contrast between Fakhri's desire to preserve cultural remnants and Bashar's determination to rebuild his home.
