= Markus Schleinzer =

Austrian film director and screenwriter

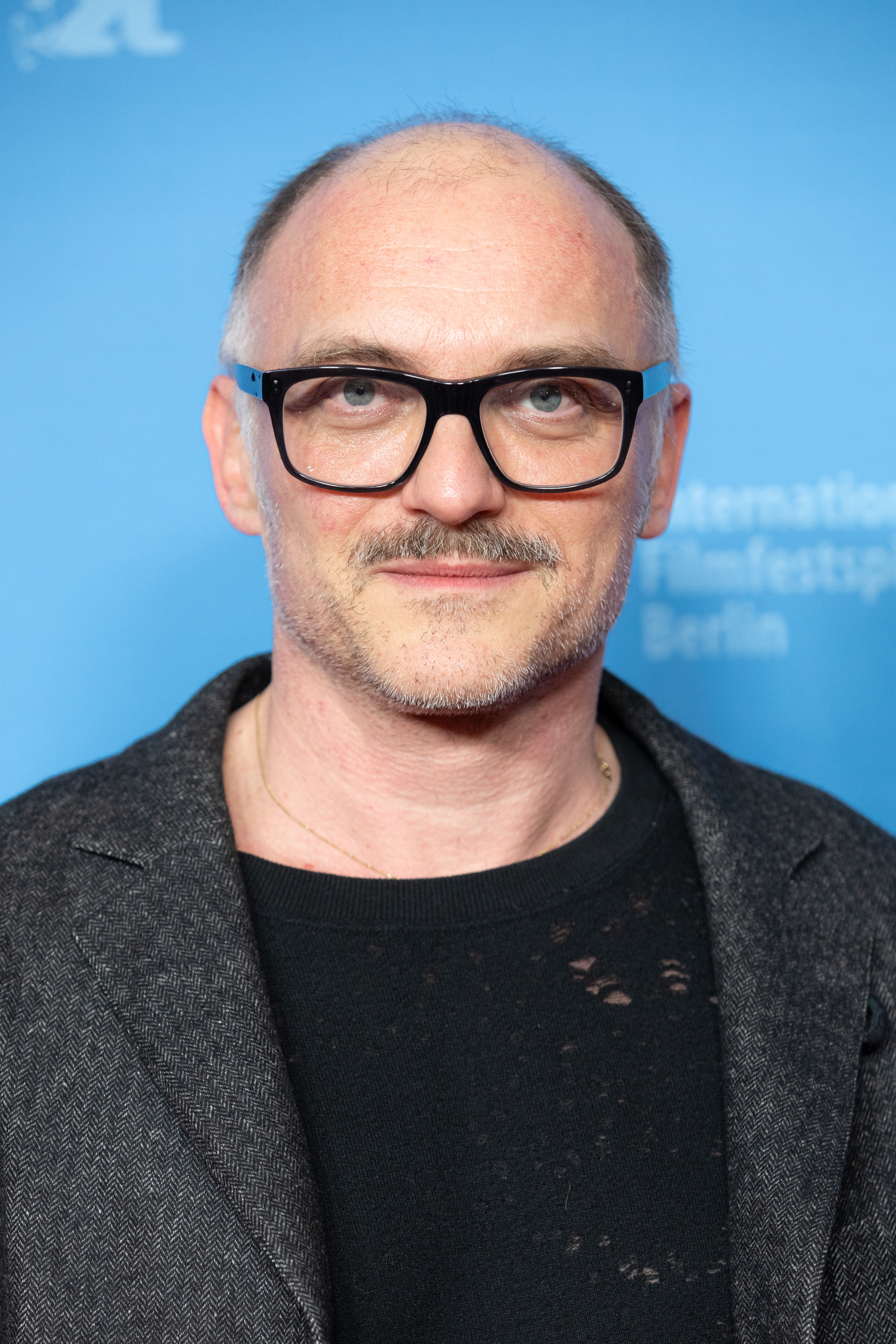
- Schleinzer in 2026
- Born: 1971 (age 54–55); Vienna, Austria
- Occupations: Film director; Screenwriter; Actor

Markus Schleinzer is an Austrian film director, screenwriter, casting director, and actor. He is best known his feature films Michael (2011) and Rose (2026).

Before establishing as a filmmaker, Schleinzer built a long career as a casting director, working on more than 60 Austrian film and television productions and collaborating with directors including Michael Haneke, Ulrich Seidl, and Jessica Hausner. His background in casting has been widely cited by Schleinzer as a formative influence on his approach to acting and staging as a director.

== Early life and background ==
Schleinzer was born in Vienna, Austria, in 1971. He spent most of his school years at BG Amerlingstraße, a secondary school in Vienna's 6th district.

== Career ==
Schleinzer appeared as an actor in Austrian and German film and television productions from the mid-1990s. His early acting work includes Ich gelobe!, directed by Wolfgang Murnberger, followed by appearances in Michael Glawogger's Slumming and Antonin Svoboda's Immer nie am Meer.

In the late 1990s, Schleinzer began working as a casting director, initially assisting casting director Daniela Stibitz. He went on to establish a long-term career in casting, serving as casting director on more than 60 predominantly Austrian film and television productions. During this period, he collaborated with filmmakers including Michael Haneke, Ulrich Seidl, Jessica Hausner and Benjamin Heisenberg.

In 2011, Schleinzer made his feature film directorial debut with Michael, which premiered in competition at the Cannes Film Festival. The film follows several months in the life of a man who has imprisoned a child in his basement. The subject matter was not disclosed in advance by the festival, and the film generated significant discussion and mixed critical responses following its screening.

In interviews, Schleinzer has stated that the screenplay for Michael was developed rapidly, with the first draft completed in approximately four days in 2008. He has also said that during the development process he consulted Austrian psychiatrist Heidi Kastner, who reviewed the script to assess the psychological plausibility of the central character.

In 2018, Schleinzer directed his second feature film, Angelo. The film premiered in competition at the Toronto International Film Festival and the San Sebastián International Film Festival. Loosely inspired by the historical figure Angelo Soliman, the film depicts the life of an African boy brought to Europe in the 18th century and raised within the Viennese aristocracy, and addresses themes of colonialism, representation and identity in Enlightenment-era Europe.

Schleinzer noted that while the screenplay was written before the 2015 refugee crisis, subsequent events inevitably altered the contemporary resonance of these images. He emphasized that the film sought to examine European colonial attitudes, including exoticism and racial hierarchy, which he described as historically rooted but not exclusive to European culture.

In 2025, Schleinzer completed his third feature film, Rose, a 17th-century period drama conceived during the promotion of his second feature. The film is set against the backdrop of the Thirty Years' War and follows a mysterious soldier who arrives in a secluded Protestant village claiming inheritance rights to an abandoned manor. Rose was co-written by Schleinzer and Alexander Brom, marking their second collaboration following Angelo. The film stars Sandra Hüller, whose character was inspired by documented historical cases of women living disguised as men in early modern Europe.

Rose had its world premiere at the main competition of the 76th Berlin International Film Festival on 15 February 2026, where it competed for the Golden Bear.

== Filmography ==
Year	Film	Role
2011	Michael	Director, writer
2014	Casanova Variations	Writer
2018	Angelo	Director, writer
2026	Rose	Director, writer
