= Fauna of South America =

Native animals of South America

The fauna of South America consists of a huge variety of unique animals some of which evolved in relative isolation. The isolation of South America allowed for many separate animal lineages to evolve, creating a lot of originality when it comes to South American animal species. The isolation of South America had an abrupt end some few million years ago when the Isthmus of Panama was formed, allowing small scale migration of animals that would result in the Great American Interchange which caused many marsupials such as Thylacosmilus to go extinct. South America is the continent with the largest number of recorded bird species.

South America is home to one of the most species-rich assemblages of freshwater fish in the world, as well as numerous endemic (species that are native to and found only within a specific geographic region) groups of mammals, birds, reptiles, and amphibians. The continent constitutes a large part of the Neotropical realm (one of Earth's eight biogeographic regions, encompassing South and Central America and characterized by tropical ecosystems) and is one of the most biologically diverse regions of the world with representative species found in a wide range of different ecosystems, including the Amazon rainforest, Andes Mountains, Pantanal, Cerrado, Atacama Desert, and Patagonian steppes.

Additionally, speciation has occurred at a higher rate in South America than in other parts of the world. This is likely due to the large amount of land mass close to the equator. The amount of speciation at the equator compared to the rest of the world is much greater.

== Freshwater Fish ==
The freshwater fish diversity observed in South America is one of the greatest in the world. There are over 5,600 described species in South American water alone, and the continent comprises less than 12% of the Earth's surface.

Dominant taxonomic groups across the area include: Charafiformes (ex: piranhas), Siluriformes (catfishes), Cichlidae (cichlids) and Gymnotiformes (ex: electric eel). Studies of the western Amazonia systems have revealed that alpha diversity (species diversity within a specific habitat or ecosystem) and beta diversity (variation in species composition between different habitats) are exceptionally high. Adjacent tributary basins often contain different fish assemblages as a result of environmental specialization and geographic isolation.

The macroevolutionary and historical mechanisms responsible for this diversity have recently been elucidated. An analysis of 4,967 species and their distribution combined with a dated phylogeny suggest that South American ichthyofauna has experienced five rapid bursts of net diversification rate during the Paleogene and Miocene epochs, which approximately corresponds to the timing of major episodes of mountain building/reorganization of South American hydrography, with western Amazonia action both as species rich "cradle" and as a source for long-term dispersal. Additionally, a study in the Western Amazon found that river captures caused by Andean uplift since the late Cretaceous resulted in a series of rapidly shifting freshwater systems, allowing the dynamic freshwater habitat to support a hotspot in species richness for fishes.

== Mammals ==
South America is home to a wide range of distinctive mammals. Notable species who inhabit those lands include the capybara (worlds largest rodents), the muriqui also known as "wooly spider monkeys", spectacled bear and maned wolf. The Andes support camelids such as llamas, alpacas, guanacos and vicuñas, while jaguars, various primates, river dolphins, and tapirs are found in the Amazon. Endemic xenarthrans (including sloths, anteaters and armadillos) remain one of the most characteristic evolutionary radiations of the continent.

== Birds ==
With over 3,400 species, South America has the highest bird diversity of any continent. Some of the groups native to those areas include humming birds, which are found mostly in the Andes, tanagers, antbirds, ovenbirds, toucans, parrots, and countless others. This significant presence of numerous birds makes Andes and Western Amazon bird diversity hotspots of the world, due to high habitat heterogeneity alongside key elevational gradients.

== Reptiles and Amphibians ==
There is a wide variety of reptiles in South America. The green anaconda, the heaviest snake in the world, is native to those lands. Caiman and lizards range from rainforest-dwelling ones and to paramo species (grassland in the high Andes). The continent is also a global center of amphibian diversity. It is home to poison dart frogs, the Surinam toad, and many species of glass frogs inhabiting Andean cloud forests. High levels of endemism and sensitivity to environmental change make amphibians particularly important indicators of ecosystem health.

== Conservation ==
Deforestation, mining, agriculture and changing climate all negatively impact South American animals. Many parts of Amazon, Atlantic Forest and Cerrado are under threat, with various species of golden lion tamarin, jaguar, and river dolphin population among the International Unit for Conservation of Nature's (IUCN) Red-listed species. Protection of wild spaces and traditional indigenous conservation are some of the measures taken to protect fauna of South America. This should be viewed as a pressing issue, and therefore, a top priority for any individual, even those who do not live directly in those affected areas. It is important to be aware of human activity impacts on nature, and how that can lead to detrimental consequences. Addressing these challenges is critical for both global biodiversity and climate stability.

== Images and Examples ==
Four examples of animals in South America appear below:

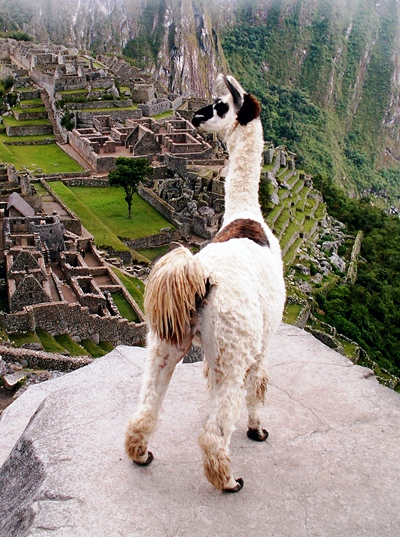
Llama - Mammal - Live in dry, open habitats - Easily domesticated (used as pack animals) - Live in herds

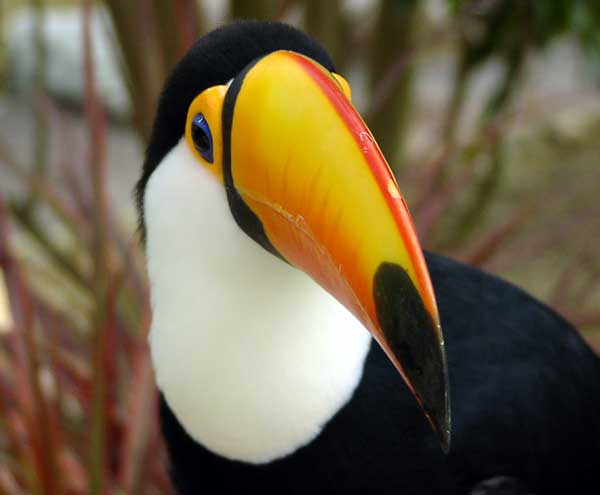
Toco toucan - Omnivore - Lifespan up to 20 years - Lay 2-4 eggs, both parents incubate - Large bill with serrated edge for capturing and peeling fruit

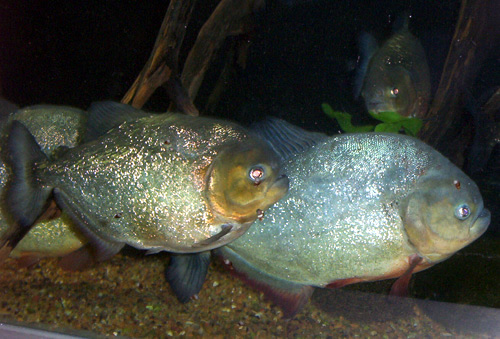
Piranha - Carnivorous fish - Mostly scavengers - Less than 2 feet in size - Most diverse in Amazon River

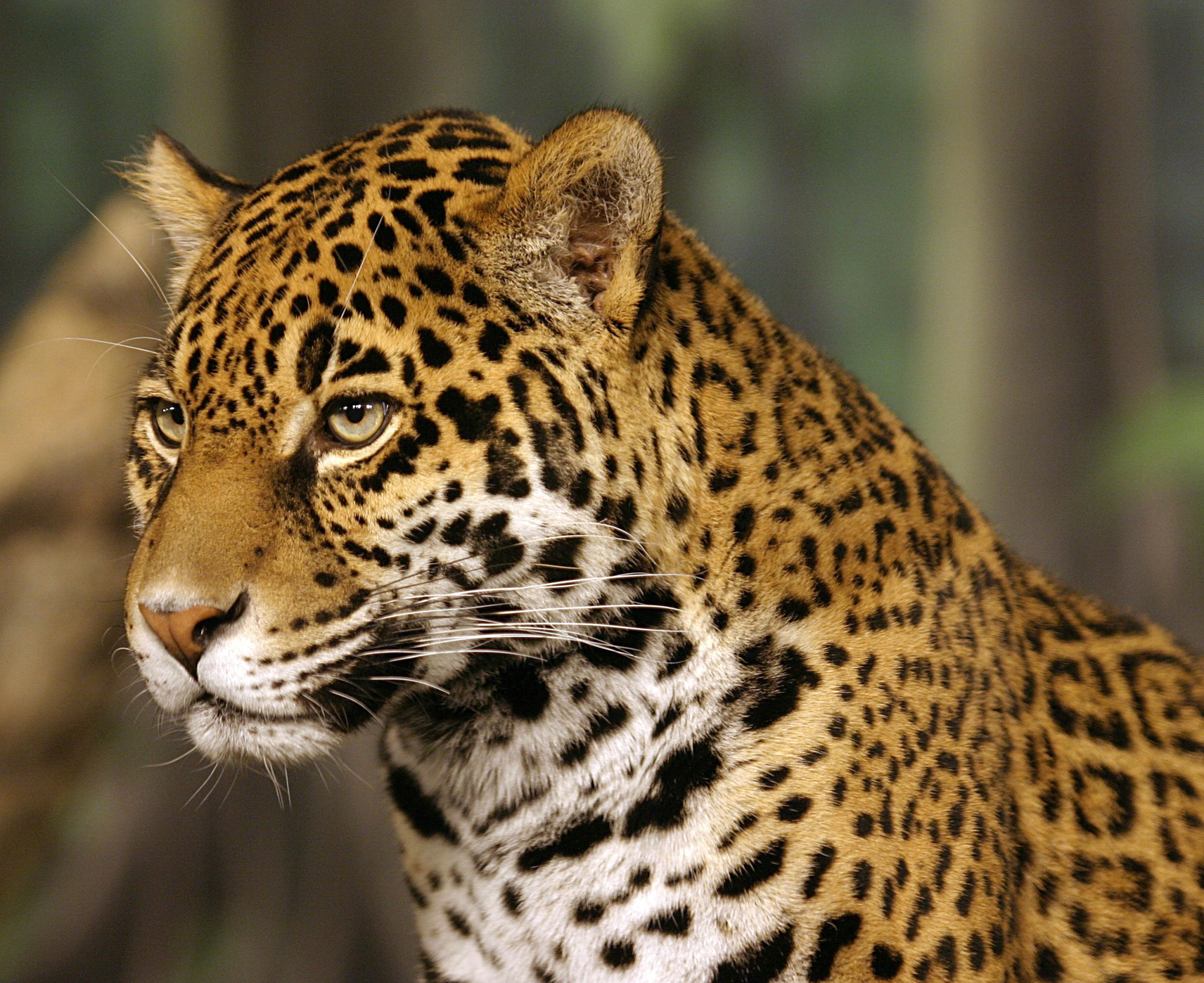
Jaguar - Cubs live with their mother for 2+ years - Only big cat in the Americas - Mostly found in tropical rainforests, but also savannas and grasslands

== Sources ==
- Patterson, Bryan; Pascual, Rosendo (1968). "The Fossil Mammal Fauna of South America". The Quarterly Review of Biology. 43 (4): 409–451. doi:10.1086/405916. JSTOR 2819014. S2CID 85357795.
