= Xiao Shan Going Home =

- Promotional image
- Traditional Chinese: 小山回家
- Simplified Chinese: 小山回家
- Hanyu Pinyin: Xiǎo Shān húi jiā
- Directed by: Jia Zhangke
- Written by: Jia Zhangke
- Produced by: Zhao Zebiao
- Starring: Wang Hongwei
- Cinematography: Hu Xin
- Edited by: Jia Zhangke
- Music by: Zhang Chu
- Production company: Beijing Film Academy
- Release date: May 1, 1995 (China)
- Running time: 59 minutes
- Country: China
- Languages: Mandarin; Jin Chinese

Xiao Shan Going Home (Chinese: 小山回家; pinyin: Xiǎo Shān húi jiā) is a Chinese featurette directed by Jia Zhangke. The film, running around one hour in length, was made by Jia while he was attending the Beijing Film Academy and stars his friend, classmate, and now frequent collaborator, Wang Hongwei in the title role.

The film follows a poor cook in Beijing as he tries to find his way back home for the Spring Festival. As one obstacle after another seems to appear before him, Xiao Shan soon realizes that his goal is moving ever further out of reach.

== Reception ==
The film, made in 1995 while Jia was still in school, screened at the 1997 Hong Kong Independent Short Film & Video Awards, where it won the Grand Prix. This put Jia in touch with the European-trained cinematographer Yu Lik-wai (who has become one of Jia's most important collaborators), and producer Li Kit Ming. The three men then began work on Jia's feature film debut, Xiao Wu, which was completed in 1997.

== Style ==
Like his later film Still Life, Xiao Shan Going Home uses intertitles seemingly divorced from the narrative, including one intertitle giving a resume-like listing of Xiao Shan's career goals, while another lists the broadcast schedule for a television station after narrating to the audience Xiao Shan's plan to go watch TV with a friend for the evening.

The film is also notable for its use of non-Mandarin dialects, including in the very first instance, where the audience is treated to the sound of Jia's native Shanxi dialect. This is in contrast to most Chinese films that had, for the most part, followed government regulations to be dubbed into Standard Chinese.
