= Karoline von Feuchtersleben =

German noblewoman

- Baroness
- Full name: Baroness Karoline Henriette Susanne Friederike von Feuchtersleben
- Born: Karoline von Feuchtersleben; 12 October 1774; Hildburghausen, Germany
- Died: 1842 (aged 67–68); Hildburghausen, Germany
- Noble family: von Feuchtersleben
- Spouses: Jean Paul (engaged 1799–1800); Karl Christoph von Grundherr zu Altenthann und Weyerhaus (m. 1817 – d. 1831)
- Father: Adjutant General Christoph Erdmann von Feuchtersleben (d. 1796)
- Mother: Rosalie Sophie Marie
- Occupation: Lady-in-waiting to Princess Charlotte of Saxe-Hildburghausen

Baroness Karoline Henriette Susanne Friederike von Feuchtersleben (née Karoline Henriette Susanne Friederike von Feuchtersleben; 12 October 1774 – 1842), was a German noblewoman and Lady-in-waiting to Princess Charlotte of Saxe-Hildburghausen. She was created a Baroness in her own right in the Saxe-Hildburghausen nobility.

== Life ==
She was born as a daughter of an Adjutant General of the army of Ernest Frederick I, Duke of Saxe-Hildburghausen, Christoph von Feuchtersleben and his wife Rosalie Marie. They were of an old Saxon noble family.

From 1798 she held the position of Lady-in-waiting to Princess Charlotte von Hildburghausen and because of this developed a close romantic relationship with writer Jean Paul who was invited to the Ducal court of Hildburghausen by Princess Charlotte. In July 1799, Paul declared his love for Feuchtersleben in a letter and in October of the same year both became secretly engaged, this engagement didn't last long when von Feuchtersleben's mother wasn't happy with her marrying someone of a lower class and income.

In October 1817, Karoline von Feuchtersleben married Karl Christoph von Grundherr zu Altenthann (1777–1831), from one of the oldest patrician families, who was four years her junior. Karl was a Counselor of the Saxe-Hildburghausen Legation, a tutor to Princes George, Friedrich and Eduard of Saxe-Hildburghausen, and later a Higher Regional Court and Consistorial Counselor.

She died in 1842 in Hildburghausen.
