= Entertainment Expo Hong Kong =

Entertainment Expo Hong Kong (traditional Chinese: 香港影視娛樂博覽; simplified Chinese: 香港影视娱乐博览) is an event held by the Hong Kong Trade Development Council. The expo was started in 2005.

The following are part of the Entertainment Expo HK:

- Hong Kong International Film & TV Market (FILMART)
- Hong Kong-Asia Film Financing Forum (HAF)
- Hong Kong Digital Entertainment Excellence Awards (HKDEEA)
- Hong Kong International Film Festival (HKIFF)
- Hong Kong Film Awards (HKFA)
- IFPI Hong Kong Top Sales Music Award
- Digital Entertainment Leadership Forum (DELF)
- Hong Kong Independent Short Films and Video Awards (ifva)

It is sponsored by the Lan Kwai Fong Entertainments.
