= Alireza Sanifar =

Iranian actor (born 1972)

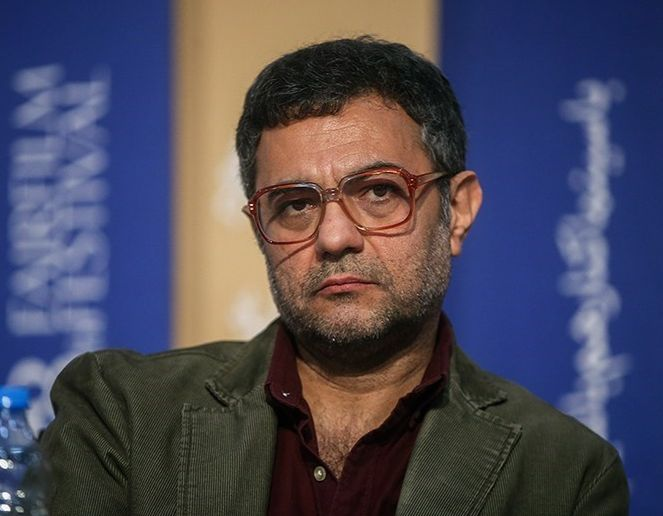
- Sanifar at the 2020 Fajr Film Festival
- Born: March 21, 1972 (age 54); Tehran, Iran
- Education: University of Art
- Occupations: Actor; screenwriter; director
- Years active: 1985–present

Alireza Sanifar (Persian: علیرضا ثانی‌فر; born March 21, 1972) is an Iranian actor, screenwriter and director. He is best known for his performances in Blue Whale (2019), Ballad of a White Cow (2020), Cause of Death: Unknown (2023), and The Savage (2025).

== Early life ==
Alireza Sanifar was born on March 21, 1972, in Tehran, Iran.

== Filmography ==
=== Film ===
Year	Title	Role	Director	Notes	Ref(s)
1985	Death of the Wolves		Jahangir Jahangiri		
2016	Bridge of Sleep	Taxi agent	Oktay Baraheni		
2016	When Did You See Sahar Last Time?	Yahya	Farzad Motamen		
2016	Patient	Saber	Siavash Shahabi	Short film	
2017	Conditional Release	Complaining worker	Hossein Shahabi		
2018	Dressage	Saeed	Pooya Badkoobeh		
2018	Horn	Police	Ghasideh Golmakani	Short film	
2019	Blood of God		Morteza Ali Abbas Mirzaee		
2019	Tattoo	Doctor	Farhad Delaram	Short film	
2019	The Ashes		Aryan Golsoorat	Short film	
2019	Driving Lessons		Marzieh Riahi	Short film	
2019	They Will Come	Yaser	Alireza Esfandiarnezhad	Short film	
2019	Dissect		Siavash Shahabi	Short film	
2019	Labyrinth		Amir Hossein Torabi		
2019	Violet	Husband	Ghasideh Golmakani	Short film	
2020	Fathers		Salem Salavati		
2020	The Rain Falls Where It Will		Majid Barzegar		
2020	Ballad of a White Cow	Reza	Maryam Moghaddam, Behtash Sanaeeha		
2020	Latyan	Mani	Ali Teymouri		
2021	Barter	Saeed	Ziba Karamali	Short film	
2021	Last Lullaby in Tehran	Behzad	Mohammad Vahdani	Short film	
2022	Passerby	Hamid	Mohammad Ali Entezarian	Short film	
2022	Teal		Arman Khansarian	Short film	
2023	Polaroide		Sara Sa'adatmand	Short film	
2023	Cause of Death: Unknown	Naser	Ali Zarnegar		
2023	There Is No Friend's House	Sedaghat	Abbas Taheri	Short film	
2024	When You Were Not Here		Kaveh Sajjadi Hosseini		
2024	Alone Together		Omid Mirzaee	Short film	
2025	Rainbow's Tale		Saleh Alavizadeh	Short film	
2025	The Third Dream	The Doctor	Mohammad Hossein Nikzad	Short film	

=== Web ===
Year	Title	Role	Director	Platform	Notes	Ref(s)
2019	Blue Whale	Dr. Zamani	Fereydoun Jeyrani	Filimo	Supporting role	
2021	Them	Saeed	Mehdi Aghajani	Filmnet	Main role; miniseries, 1 episode	
2021–2022	The Professional	Kamran	Mostafa Taghizadeh	Namava	Main role	
2022	Lily's Turn		Rouhollah Hejazi	Namava	Supporting role	
2023–2024	Accomplice	Hamid	Maziar Miri	Namava	Main role; miniseries	
2025	The Savage	Movahedi	Houman Seyyedi	Filmnet	Main role	
2026	Polka Dot	Faramarz	Ebrahim Irajzad	Sheyda	Main role	

== Awards and nominations ==
Name of the award ceremony, year presented, category, nominee of the award, and the result of the nomination
Award	Year	Category	Nominated Work	Result	Ref(s)
Hafez Awards	2025	Best Actor – Motion Picture	Cause of Death: Unknown	Nominated	
Iran's Film Critics and Writers Association	2025	Best Actor in a Supporting Role	Cause of Death: Unknown	Honorary Diploma	
