= Esmail Mehrabi =

Iranian actor (born 1944)

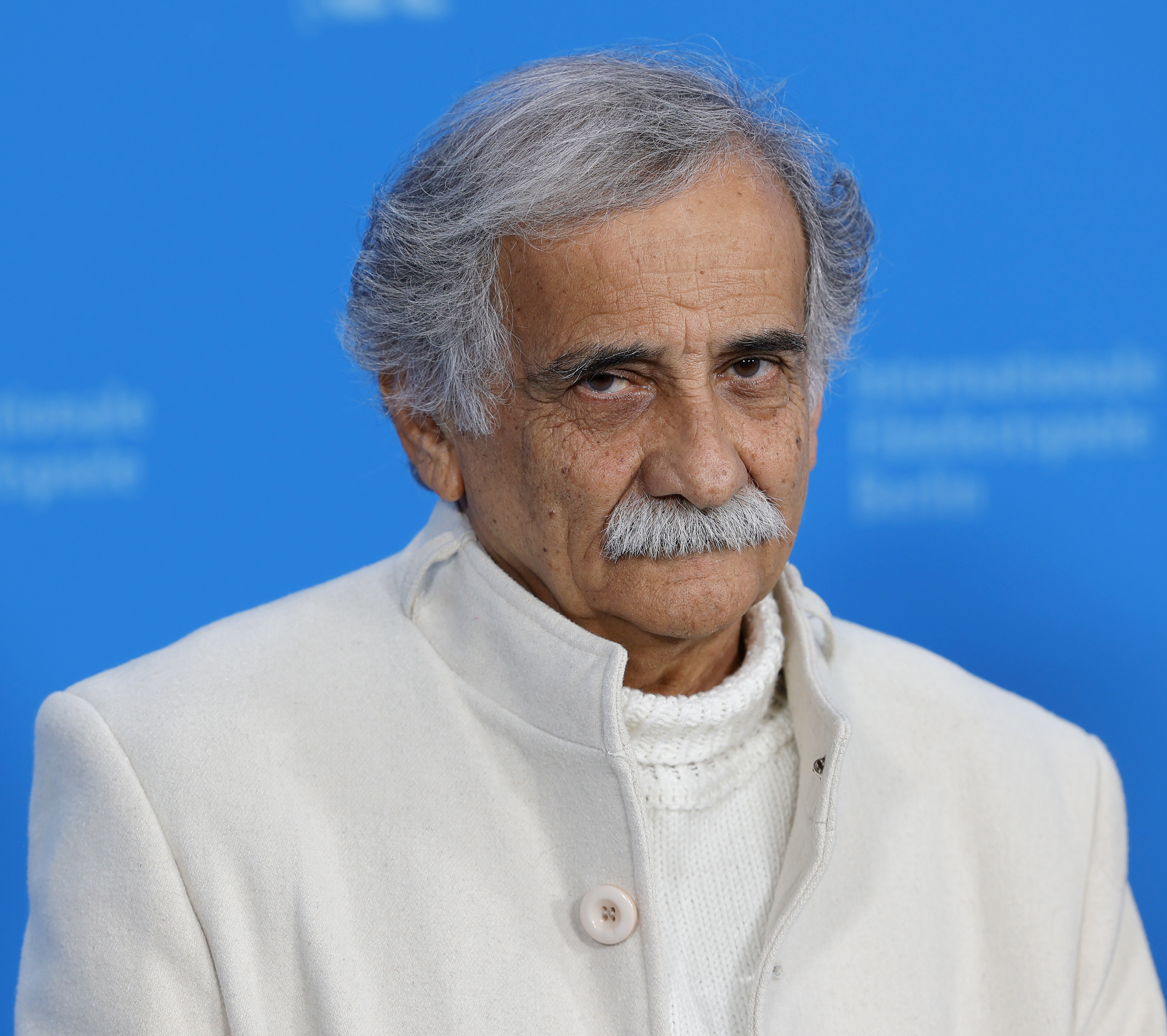
- Mehrabi at the 2024 Berlinale
- Born: 1944 (age 81–82); Tonekabon, Iran
- Education: University of Tehran
- Occupation: Actor
- Years active: 1966–present
- Children: 4

Esmail Mehrabi (Persian: اسماعیل محرابی; born 1944) is an Iranian actor who is best known for his roles in Sarbadars (1983–1984), Nightingales (1988), Courtship (1989), Green House (1996), and My Favourite Cake (2024).

== Filmography ==
=== Film ===
Year	Title	Role	Director	Notes	Ref(s)
1981	Vultures Die		Jamshid Heydari		
1982	Under Siege		Akbar Sadeghi		
1983	Balash		Akbar Sadeghi		
1987	The First Lawyer		Jamshid Heydari		
1989	Courtship		Mehdi Fakhimzadeh		
2008	For the Sake of My Sister		Hojatollah Seifi		
2016	Temporary License	Nazmi	Afshin Hashemi		
2024	My Favourite Cake	Faramarz	Maryam Moghaddam, Behtash Sanaeeha		
2024	The Last Role		Saeed Bayat	Short film	

=== Television ===
Year	Title	Role	Director	Network	Notes	Ref(s)
1983–1984	Sarbadars	Hossein Hamzeh	Mohammad Ali Najafi	IRIB TV1	TV series; supporting role	
1985	Avicenna	Son of Mansur II	Keyhan Rahgozar	IRIB TV2	TV series; main role	
1988	Nightingales	Nasrollah Khorami	Ali Hatami	IRIB TV1	TV series; main role	
1996	Green House	Mojtaba	Bijan Birang, Masoud Rasam	IRIB TV2	TV series; main role	
1997	Green Land	Mojtaba	Bijan Birang, Masoud Rasam	IRIB TV2	TV series; main role	
2007	Nima Yooshij	Nima Yooshij	Nader Kajori	IRIB TV2	TV film; main role	
2020	Soldier	Yahya	Hadi Moghaddamdoost	IRIB TV3	TV series; supporting role	
2021	Yavar	Ali Shahmirzadi	Saeed Soltani, Asghar Naimi	IRIB TV3	TV series; supporting role	
2021	Maple	Sirous Gholipour	Behrang Tofighi	IRIB TV1	TV series; supporting role	
2022	Self-Willed	Asadollah Ahmadi Sefid Kamar	Alireza Bazrafshan	IRIB TV1	TV series; supporting role	
2022	City Travelers		Sirous Hassanpour	IRIB TV5	TV series; episode 2; leading role	
2024	Stranger	Bahram Entezami	Soroush Mohammadzadeh	IRIB TV3	TV series; supporting role	
