= Lily Farhadpour =

Iranian actress and writer (born 1962)

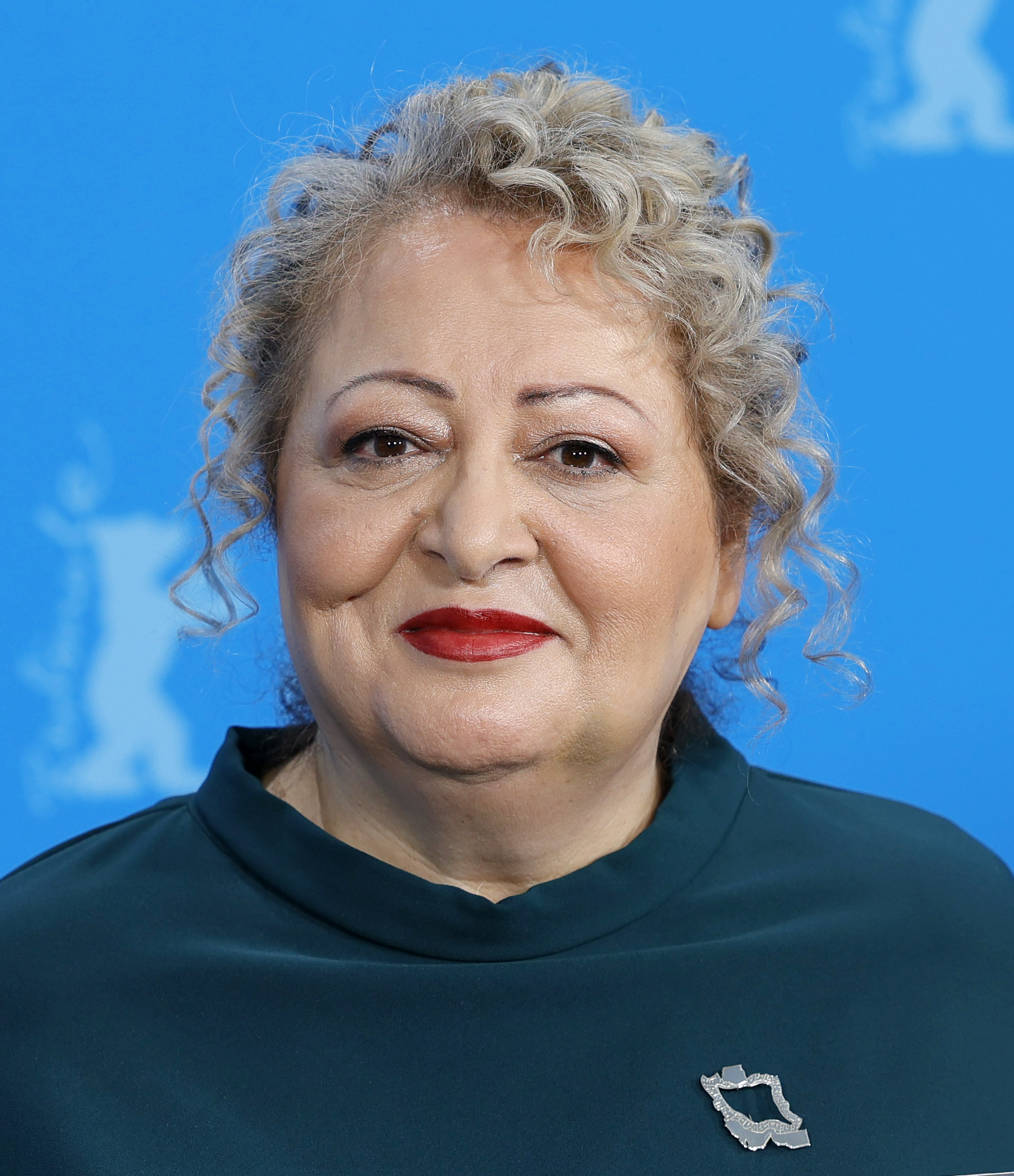
- Farhadpour at the 2024 Berlinale
- Born: March 1962 (age 63); Tehran, Iran
- Occupations: Actress; writer; activist; journalist
- Years active: 2009–present
- Spouse: Masrour Tonekaboni
- Children: 1

Lily Farhadpour (Persian: لیلی فرهادپور; born March 1962) is an Iranian actress, writer, activist and journalist who is best known for her role as Mahin in My Favourite Cake (2024).

== Filmography ==
=== Film ===
Year	Title	Role	Director	Notes	Ref(s)
2010	Please Do Not Disturb	Married woman	Mohsen Abdolvahab		
2012	Kissing the Moon-Like Face		Homayoun As'adian		
2014	Sensitive Floor	Mr. Kamali's sister	Kamal Tabrizi		
2014	Angels Descend Together	Doctor	Hamed Mohammadi		
2015	Time to Love	Bita's mother	Alireza Raisian		
2016	Mina's Choice	Neighbor	Kamal Tabrizi		
2016	Hangover	Mother	Dariush Ghazbani		
2017	Behind the Wall of Silence	Arash's mother	Masoud Jafari Jozani		
2017	Searing Summer	Kindergarten's manager	Ebrahim Irajzad		
2017	The Land I'm Drowning In		Negin Khazaee, Léa Carbogno	Short film	
2018	Highlight	Kourosh's mother	Asghar Naimi		
2018	Flaming		Hamid Nematollah		
2018	Orange Days	Leila	Arash Lahouti		
2018	August	Neighbor	Bahman Kamyar		
2019	Violet	Auntie	Ghasideh Golmakani	Short film	
2019	Jamshidieh	Sorour	Yalda Jebeli		
2019	Suddenly a Tree	Giti	Safi Yazdanian		
2020	Amphibious	Pari	Borzou Niknejad		
2020	Ballad of a White Cow	Mina's neighbor	Maryam Moghaddam, Behtash Sanaeeha		
2020	The Visit		Azadeh Moussavi	Short film	
2023	Ropewalker Memories		Hamed Rajabi		
2024	My Favourite Cake	Mahin	Maryam Moghaddam, Behtash Sanaeeha		

=== Web ===
Year	Title	Role	Director	Platform	Notes	Ref(s)
2023	Actor	Samadian's worker	Nima Javidi	Filimo, Namava	Recurring role	

== Awards and nominations ==
Award	Year	Category	Nominated Work	Result	Ref(s)
Krafft International Film Festival	2024	Golden Apple Grand Prix	My Favourite Cake	Won	
