= Tenement (disambiguation) =

A tenement or tenement house is a type of building shared by multiple dwellings, typically with flats or apartments on each floor and with shared entrance stairway access.

Tenement or tenement house may also refer to:

== Films ==
- Tenement (1985 film), an American exploitation urban horror film
- Tenement (2024 film), a Cambodian folk horror film
- Tenement House (film), a 1951 Mexican drama film

== Other uses ==
- Tenement (law), a concept in property or mining law
- Tenement (band), an American rock band
- Tenement House (Glasgow), a museum in Glasgow

== See also ==
- Tenement Museum (disambiguation)
