= My Favourite Cake =

2024 international co-production film

- German theatrical release poster
- Persian: کیک محبوب من
- Directed by: Maryam Moghaddam; Behtash Sanaeeha
- Written by: Maryam Moghaddam; Behtash Sanaeeha
- Produced by: Etienne de Ricaud; Peter Krupenin; Gholamreza Moosavi; Behtash Sanaeeha; Christopher Zitterbart
- Starring: Lily Farhadpour; Esmail Mehrabi
- Cinematography: Mohammad Haddadi
- Edited by: Ata Mehrad; Behtash Sanaeeha; Ricardo Saraiva
- Music by: Henrik Nagy
- Production companies: Caractères Productions; Watchmen Productions; HOBAB; Filmsazan Javan
- Distributed by: Totem Films
- Release date: 16 February 2024 (Berlinale)
- Running time: 97 minutes
- Countries: Iran; France; Sweden; Germany
- Language: Persian
- Box office: $2.5 million

My Favourite Cake (Persian: کیک محبوب من, translit. Keyk-e mahbub-e man) is a 2024 romantic tragicomedy film co-written and -directed by Iranian filmmakers Maryam Moghaddam and Behtash Sanaeeha, and starring Lily Farhadpour and Esmail Mehrabi. The film tells the story of a woman who decides to live out her desires in a country where women's rights are greatly restricted.

The international co-production between Iran, France, Sweden, and Germany had its world premiere on 16 February 2024 at the main competition for the Golden Bear at the 74th Berlin International Film Festival. The filmmakers were issued travel bans during post-production, and prohibited from attending the premiere in Berlin, by the Iranian Government.

== Synopsis ==
Seventy-year-old Mahin has been widowed for 30 years and her two children live abroad. She is living a lonely life in Tehran. But one day, she decides to join her friends for afternoon tea and finds a new spark in her heart. She meets someone who makes her feel alive again, and their evening together brings unpredictable surprises and memories.

== Cast ==
- Lily Farhadpour as Mahin
- Esmail Mehrabi as Faramarz

== Production ==
=== Background ===
The film follows the story of a woman who decides to live out her desires in a country where women's rights are greatly restricted.

=== Funding and production ===
The film was among the first six films selected for the first round of the New Dawn scheme (Note: In 2022 nine European public funds launch New Dawn to increase diversity in film.) after its launch in 2022.

The film, the third by the Iranian writing-directing duo Maryam Moqadam and Behtash Sanaeeha, is a co-production by FilmSazan Javan (Iran), Caractères Productions (France), HOBAB (Sweden) and Watchmen Productions (Germany). It was supported by the Swedish Film Institute, Sveriges Television, New Dawn, ZDF/ARTE, Medienboard Berlin-Brandenburg, the World Cinema Fund, the CNC's Aide aux cinemas du monde, the Institut Français, the Île-de-France region, Eurimages and the Berlinale Co-Production Market. It was also supported by the World Cinema Fund.

=== Iranian action against directors ===
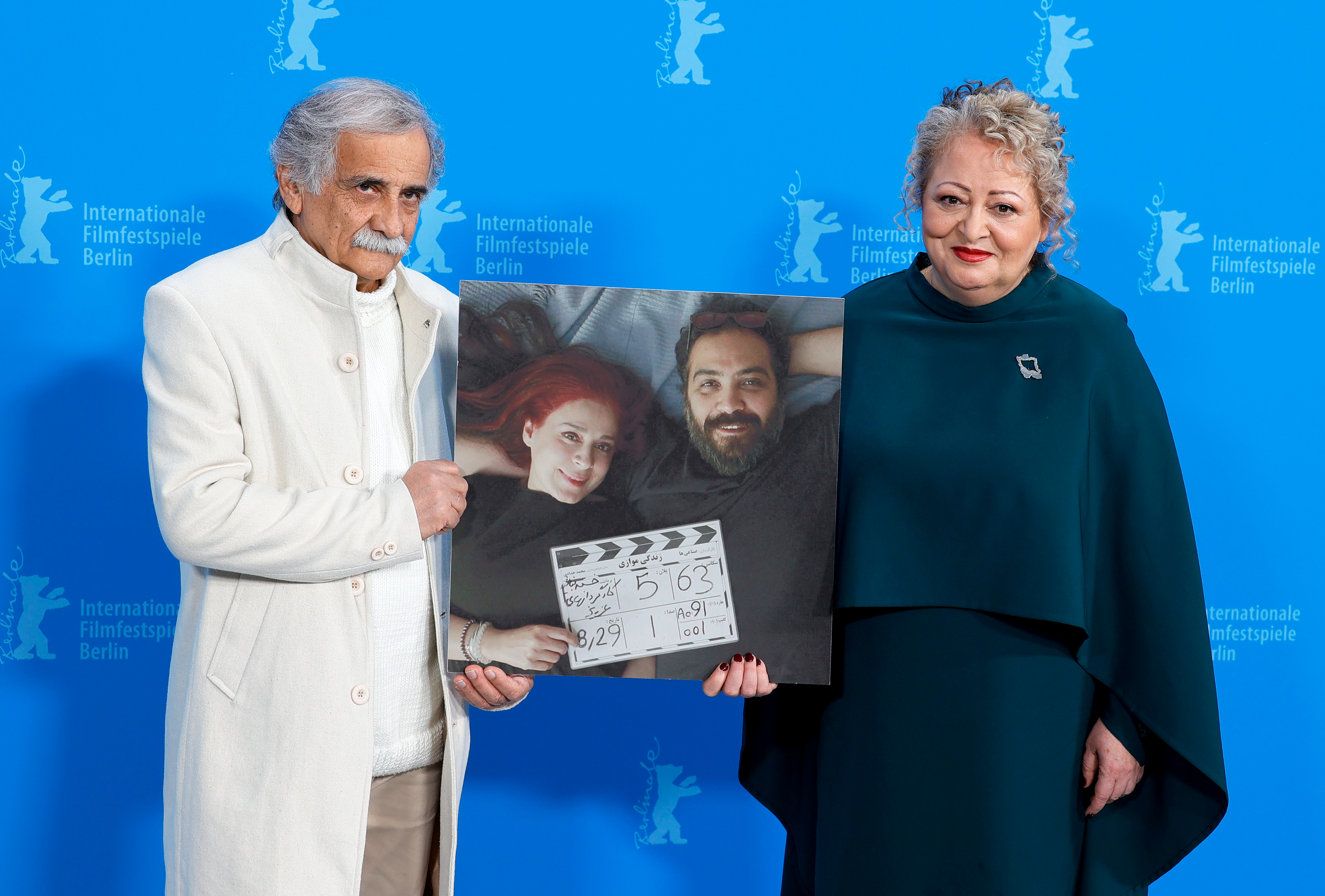
Esmail Mehrabi and Lily Farhadpour from My Favourite Cake with a photo of Maryam Moghaddam and Behtash Sanaeeha, who were not allowed to leave the country (Berlinale 2024)

In September 2023, when Moghaddam and Sanaeeha wanted to travel to Paris for the post-production of the film, their passports were confiscated and they were threatened with criminal charges. This followed a raid on the home of the film's editor by Iranian security forces, during which they seized rushes and other material relating to the production. The media saw a connection in these actions to their acclaimed 2020 film Ballad of a White Cow, which encountered the wrath of Iran's strict Islamic government. In December 2023, approximately 30 film organisations, festivals and filmmakers, as well as non-governmental organisations for freedom of expression, wrote an open letter calling on the Iranian authorities to immediately drop all charges against the duo and to lift their travel ban. Signatories included the Berlinale, the International Coalition for Filmmakers at Risk (ICFR) and PEN America.

In January 2024, after its nomination to compete at the 74th Berlinale, the festival again called for freedom of travel and freedom of expression for the directing duo.

In December 2024 the directors, forbidden from making movies, working, and travelling, were on trial in Iran, held in Evin prison, for propaganda against the regime, breaking Islamic rules by making a vulgar movie, and spreading prostitution and libertinism.

== Release ==
My Favourite Cake had its world premiere on 16 February 2024, as part of the 74th Berlin International Film Festival, in competition. The Iranian Government would not permit the directors to attend, so they issued a statement to be read out at the screening by actress Lily Farhadpour, including these words:

We have come to believe that it is no longer possible to tell the story of an Iranian woman while obeying strict laws such as the mandatory hijab. Women for whom the red lines prevent the depiction of their true lives, as full human beings. This time, we decided to cross all of the restrictive red lines, and accept the consequences of our choice to paint a real picture of Iranian women – images that have been banned in Iranian cinema ever since the Islamic Revolution...

My Favourite Cake is a film made in praise of life. This is a story based on the reality of the everyday lives of middle-class women in Iran, a close look at a woman’s solitude as she enters her golden years. A vision of the reality of women’s lives which has not often been told. It is a story that is contrary to the common image of Iranian women, and similar to the life stories of many lonely people on this planet, about savouring the short, sweet moments in life...

Ladies and gentlemen, we proudly dedicate our premiere screening to the honorable and brave women of our country who have moved to the front lines of the fight for social change, who are attempting to tear down the walls of outdated and fossilised beliefs, and who sacrifice their lives to achieve freedom.

It was screened at Lichter Filmfest Frankfurt International, Frankfurt, Germany, on 20 April 2024. The film was also screened in the Horizons section of the 58th Karlovy Vary International Film Festival on 28 June 2024.

In Canada, the film was screened in the Special Presentations at the 2024 Cinéfest Sudbury International Film Festival held from 14-22 September 2024 in Sudbury, Ontario. It was also featured in galas and special presentations of 2024 Vancouver International Film Festival and was screened on 2 October 2024.

It screened in the late October in competition at the 69th Valladolid International Film Festival for the Golden Spike, and on 25 October at the Adelaide Film Festival in Australia. then at the Chicago International Film Festival, where it won Silver Hugo for the best New Directors. On 28 October 2024, the film was showcased at the 37th Tokyo International Film Festival in the "Women’s Empowerment" section.

The Paris-based sales and production company Totem Films acquired international sales rights to the film before its Berlinale world premiere.

== Reception ==
On the review aggregator Rotten Tomatoes website, the film has an approval rating of 100% based on 33 reviews, with an average rating of 8.30/10.

Peter Bradshaw reviewing for The Guardian rated the film with 5 stars out of 5 and touching on the topical controversy where Maryam Moghaddam and Behtash Sanaeeha, the directors of the film, were prevented from travelling to Berlin to attend their own premiere; he wrote, "As well as everything else, this wonderfully sweet and funny film will contribute to the debate about whether repressive regimes are the nursery of artistic greatness." Bradshaw praised the performance of the lead pair and concluded the review terming the film as lovely and wrote, "There is something quietly magnificent in it as moments like these in life are poignantly brief – but many never have them at all.

Jessica Kiang writing in Variety gave positive review and said, "What it lacks in edge, the film certainly makes up for in the quality of its performances...." Leslie Felperin reviewing the film for The Hollywood Reporter dubbed it as "A delicious slice of life.," and opined, "Moghaddam and Sanaeeha and the actors turn this set piece into a whirling dervish of elderly seduction, executed with crack comic timing, precise choreography for both the camera and the characters themselves, and one of the all-time great crash cuts." Serena Seghedoni reviewing at Berlinale in Loud And Clear Reviews awarded 4 stars and wrote, "My Favourite Cake is a story that absolutely needs to be told: the heartwarming, hilarious, sweet, devastating, tragic tale of a woman who one day dares to be free."

RogerEbert.com's Robert Daniels compared the character of Mahin to the lead in the Georgian drama Blackbird Blackbird Blackberry, writing, "each woman is seeking a kind of autumnal relationship, defying their oppressive surroundings before it's too late."

== Accolades ==
Award	Date	Category	Recipient	Result	Ref.
Eurimages Co-production Development Award	19 February 2022	Eurimages Award	My Favourite Cake	Won	
Berlin International Film Festival	25 February 2024	Golden Bear	Maryam Moqadam and Behtash Sanaeeha	Nominated	
Berlin International Film Festival	25 February 2024	FIPRESCI Prize	My Favourite Cake	Won	
Berlin International Film Festival	25 February 2024	Prize of the Ecumenical Jury	My Favourite Cake	Won	
Cinéfest Sudbury International Film Festival	26 September 2024	Outstanding International Feature	My Favourite Cake	Won	
Valladolid International Film Festival	26 October 2024	Golden Spike	My Favourite Cake	Nominated	
Chicago International Film Festival	27 October 2024	New Directors Competition: Silver Hugo	Maryam Moghaddam, Behtash Sanaeeha	Won	
