= Hoda Zarbaf =

Iranian-Canadian multimedia artist (1982–2020)

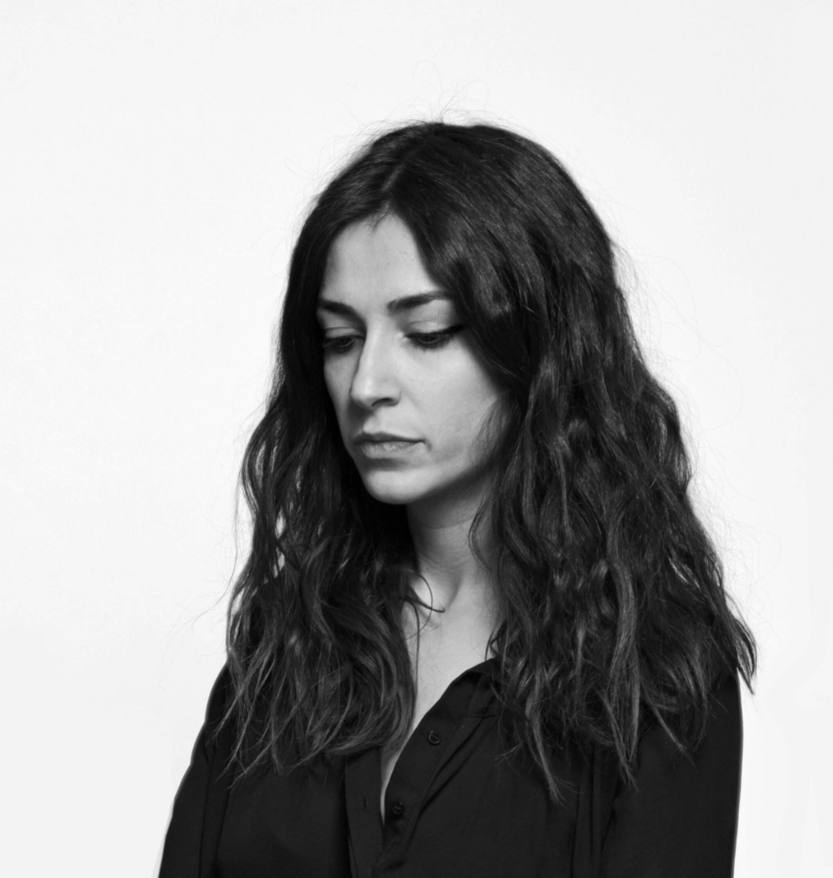
- Hoda Zarbaf
- Born: July 14, 1982; Tehran, Iran
- Died: November 28, 2020 (aged 38)
- Education: University of Tehran (BFA, 2001): Tehran University of Art (M.A.); University of Windsor (MFA, 2010)

Hoda Zarbaf (July 14, 1982 – November 28, 2020) was an Iranian-Canadian multimedia artist and sculptor. During her career she produced over 50 multimedia installations, sculptures, and compositions. Her work is focused on memory, nostalgia, and female sexuality and desire.

== Personal life and education ==
Zarbaf was born in Tehran. In high school, she studied graphics. She obtained an BFA in painting from the University of Tehran in 2001 and went on to obtain a Master's degree in animation from the Tehran University of Art. She moved to Canada in 2008 and obtained an MFA from the University of Windsor in 2010.

Zarbaf died at her home in 2020, a week after the close of her final solo show.

== Career ==
Zarbaf began her career in Tehran, as a Persian art instructor at Feresteh High School and painting instructor at Mah Contemporary Art studio. After obtaining her MFA from the University of Windsor, she exhibited her work in cities such as Toronto, Tehran, Hamburg, and New York.

Her work is largely composed of found objects and fabric which she fused with ceramics, lights, sound and video to create patchwork style sculptures.

Her solo exhibition "Soft Souls" received media attention in both Hi-Fructose Magazine and Now Magazine. The publications discuss the central work Vaginal Rapture, and Now Magazine says the works are "empowering expressions of the emotional experience of the female sexual body".

== Exhibitions ==
=== Solo ===
- [un]veiling, Art LeBel Gallery, Windsor, Ontario (2010)
- Soft Souls, Walnut Contemporary Gallery, Toronto (2015)
- Floral Compositions: Travellers of Time, Aaran Gallery (2016)
- We Are Image-making Machines, Aaran Projects (2017)
- "Honey, I am Home!", Dastan Gallery, Tehran (2020)

=== Group ===
- 2021 Video Art Installation, “Front Camera/Back Camera”, Curated by Sanam Samanian, Onsite Gallery (OCAD University, Toronto), The Bridge & Tunnel Gallery (Brooklyn, New York), Ab-Anbar Gallery (London), Park Hub (Milan), Dastan Gallery (Tehran), Yavuz Gallery (Sydney), International Presentation
- 2021 Group Exhibition, “Seemingly Playful”, Curated by Maximilian Homaei, Yavuz Gallery, Sydney, Australia
- Hot Dog Car Wash, Campbell River Art Gallery, Campbell River, British Columbia (2017)
- 8th Annual of Contemporary Art, Persbook (2018)
