= List of submissions to the 98th Academy Awards for Best International Feature Film =

2025 Best International Feature submissions
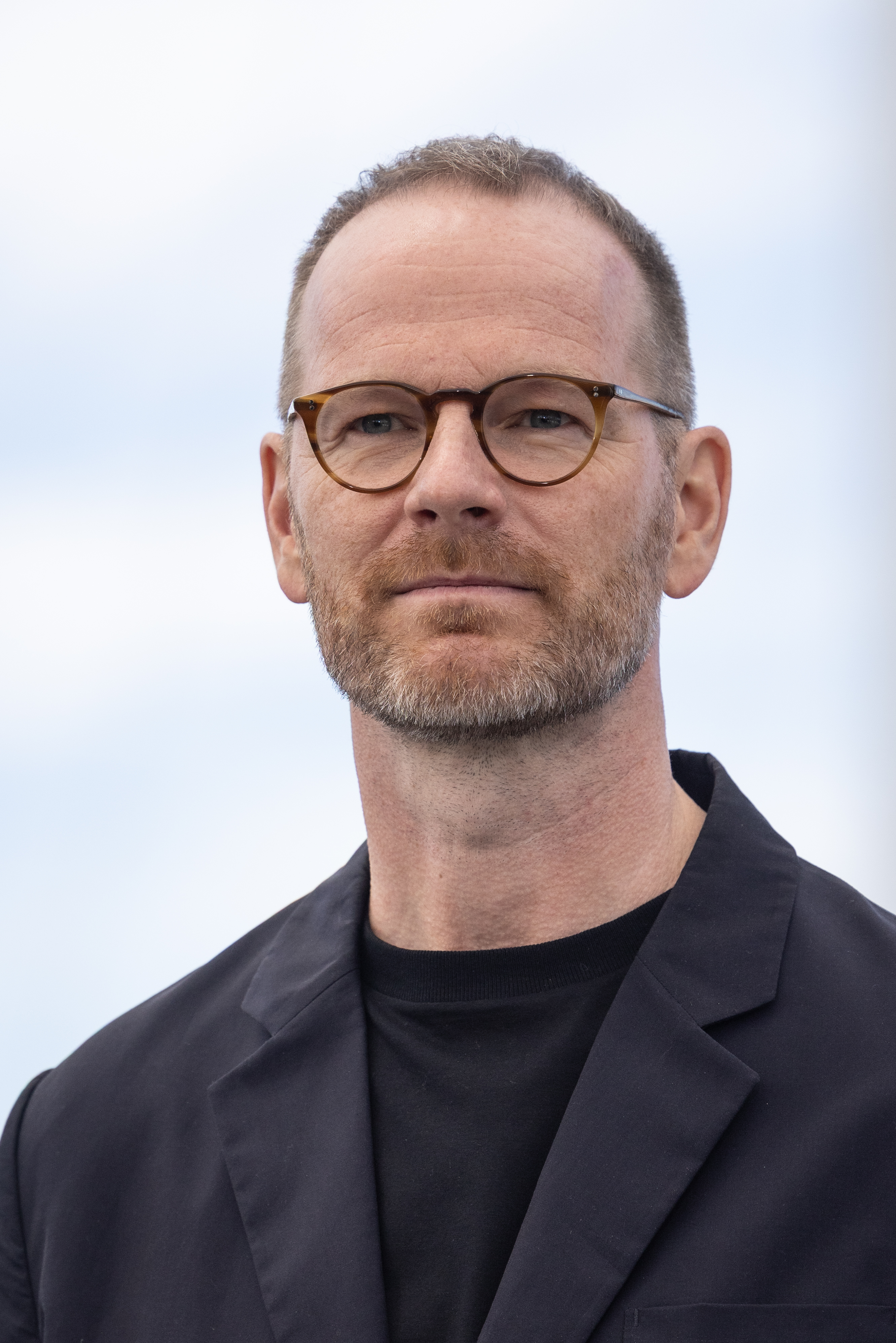
- Joachim Trier directed Sentimental Value, which won the year's award.

Highlights
- Oscar winner: (Norway) Sentimental Value
- Submissions: 92
- Debuts: 2
- Total eligible: 86

This is a list of submissions to the 98th Academy Awards for the Best International Feature Film. The Academy of Motion Picture Arts and Sciences (AMPAS) has invited the film industries of various countries to submit their best film for the Academy Award for Best International Feature Film every year since the award was created in 1956. The award is presented annually by the Academy to a feature-length motion picture produced outside the United States that contains primarily non-English dialogue. The International Feature Film Award Committee oversees the process and reviews all the submitted films. The category was previously called the Best Foreign Language Film, but this was changed in April 2019 to Best International Feature Film, after the Academy deemed the word "Foreign" to be outdated.

For the 98th Academy Awards, the submitted motion pictures must have first been released theatrically in their respective countries between 1 October 2024 and 30 September 2025. The deadline for submissions to the Academy was 1 October 2025. 92 countries submitted films, and 86 were found to be eligible by AMPAS and screened for voters. Madagascar and Papua New Guinea submitted films for the first time, and Haiti resubmitted its film disqualified from last year's list, while Greenland made a submission for the first time since 2012; however, Papua New Guinea's film did not appear on the final list. After the 15-film shortlist was announced on 16 December 2025, the five nominees were announced on 22 January 2026. For the second year in a row, two films nominated for International Feature were also nominated for Best Picture, The Secret Agent (Brazil) and Sentimental Value (Norway), with the latter receiving nine nominations.

Norway won the award for the first time with Sentimental Value by Joachim Trier, which was also nominated for Best Picture, Best Director and Best Original Screenplay.

== Submissions ==
| Submitting country | Film title used in nomination | Original title | Language(s) | Director(s) | Result |
|---|---|---|---|---|---|
| Albania | Luna Park | | Albanian, Greek | Florenc Papas | Not nominated |
| Argentina | Belén | | Spanish, English, Brazilian Portuguese | Dolores Fonzi | Made shortlist |
| Armenia | My Armenian Phantoms | Իմ հայկական ուրվականները / Mes fantômes arméniens | Armenian, Russian, French | Tamara Stepanyan | Not nominated |
| Australia | The Wolves Always Come at Night | Чоно үүр шөнөөр ирдэг | Mongolian | Gabrielle Brady | Not nominated |
| Austria | Peacock | Pfau – Bin ich echt? | German, English | Bernhard Wenger | Not nominated |
| Azerbaijan | Taghiyev: Oil | Tağıyev: Neft | Azerbaijani, Russian | Zaur Gasimli | Not nominated |
| Bangladesh | A House Named Shahana | বাড়ির নাম শাহানা | Bengali | Leesa Gazi | Not nominated |
| Belgium | Young Mothers | Jeunes mères | French | Jean-Pierre and Luc Dardenne | Not nominated |
| Bhutan | I, the Song | མོ་གི་གསང་བའི་ཞབས་ཁྲ | Dzongkha, English | Dechen Roder | Not nominated |
| Bolivia | The Southern House | La casa del sur | Spanish | Carina Oroza Daroca and Ramiro Fierro | Not nominated |
| Bosnia and Herzegovina | Blum: Masters of Their Own Destiny | Blum – Gospodari svoje budućnosti | Bosnian, English, German | Jasmila Žbanić | Not nominated |
| Brazil | The Secret Agent | O Agente Secreto | Brazilian Portuguese, German | Kleber Mendonça Filho | Nominated |
| Bulgaria | Tarika | Стадото | Bulgarian, Greek | Milko Lazarov | Not nominated |
| Cambodia | Tenement | អ្នកស្នងអគារ | Khmer, Japanese, English | Inrasothythep Neth and Sokyou Chea | Not on the final list |
| Canada | The Things You Kill | Öldürdüğün Şeyler | Turkish, Persian, English | Alireza Khatami | Not nominated |
| Chile | The Mysterious Gaze of the Flamingo | La misteriosa mirada del flamenco | Spanish | Diego Céspedes | Not nominated |
| China | Dead to Rights | 南京照相馆 | Mandarin, Nanjingese, Shanghainese, Japanese, English | Shen Ao | Not nominated |
| Colombia | A Poet | Un poeta | Spanish | Simón Mesa Soto | Not nominated |
| Costa Rica | The Altar Boy, the Priest and the Gardener | El monaguillo, el cura y el jardinero | Spanish | Juan Manuel Fernández | Not nominated |
| Croatia | Fiume o morte! | | Fiuman, Croatian, Italian | Igor Bezinović | Not nominated |
| Czech Republic | I'm Not Everything I Want to Be | Ještě nejsem, kým chci být | Czech | Klára Tasovská | Not nominated |
| Denmark | Mr. Nobody Against Putin | Mr. Nobody mod Putin | Russian, English | David Borenstein | Not nominated |
| Dominican Republic | Pepe | | Spanish, Afrikaans, Mbukushu, German | Nelson Carlo de los Santos Arias | Not nominated |
| Ecuador | Chuzalongo | | Spanish, Kichwa | Diego Ortuño | Not nominated |
| Egypt | Happy Birthday | هابي بيرث داي | Arabic | Sarah Goher | Not nominated |
| Estonia | Rolling Papers | Pikad paberid | Estonian | Meel Paliale | Not nominated |
| Finland | 100 Litres of Gold | 100 litraa sahtia | Finnish | Teemu Nikki | Not nominated |
| France | It Was Just an Accident | یک تصادف ساده / Un simple accident | Persian, Azerbaijani | Jafar Panahi | Nominated |
| Georgia | Panopticon | პანოპტიკონი | Georgian | George Sikharulidze | Not nominated |
| Germany | Sound of Falling | In die Sonne schauen | German, Low German | Mascha Schilinski | Made shortlist |
| Greece | Arcadia | Αρκάντια | Greek, English | Yorgos Zois | Not nominated |
| Greenland | Walls | Akinni Inuk | Greenlandic | Sofie Rørdam and Nina Paninnguaq Skydsbjerg | Not nominated |
| Haiti | Kidnapping Inc. | | Haitian Creole, French, Spanish, English | Bruno Mourral | Not nominated |
| Hong Kong | The Last Dance | 破·地獄 | Cantonese | Anselm Chan | Not nominated |
| Hungary | Orphan | Árva | Hungarian | László Nemes | Not nominated |
| Iceland | The Love That Remains | Ástin sem eftir er | Icelandic, Danish, Swedish, French | Hlynur Pálmason | Not nominated |
| India | Homebound | | Hindi | Neeraj Ghaywan | Made shortlist |
| Indonesia | Sore: A Wife from the Future | Sore: Istri dari Masa Depan | Indonesian, Croatian, English | Yandy Laurens | Not nominated |
| Iran | Cause of Death: Unknown | علت مرگ: نامعلوم | Persian | Ali Zarnegar | Not nominated |
| Iraq | The President's Cake | مملكة القصب | Arabic | Hasan Hadi | Made shortlist |
| Ireland | Sanatorium | Санаторій | Ukrainian | Gar O’Rourke | Not nominated |
| Israel | The Sea | הים / البحر | Arabic, Hebrew | Shai Carmeli-Pollak | Not nominated |
| Italy | Familia | | Italian | Francesco Costabile | Not nominated |
| Japan | Kokuho | 国宝 | Kansai Japanese | Lee Sang-il | Made shortlist |
| Jordan | All That's Left of You | اللي باقي منك | Arabic, English, Hebrew | Cherien Dabis | Made shortlist |
| Kazakhstan | Cadet | Кадет | Kazakh, Russian | Adilkhan Yerzhanov | Disqualified |
| Kyrgyzstan | Black Red Yellow | Кара Кызыл Сары | Kyrgyz, Russian | Aktan Arym Kubat | Not nominated |
| Latvia | Dog of God | Dieva suns | Latvian, German | Lauris Ābele and Raitis Ābele | Not nominated |
| Lebanon | A Sad and Beautiful World | نجوم الأمل و الألم | Arabic | Cyril Aris | Not nominated |
| Lithuania | The Southern Chronicles | Pietinia kronikas | Lithuanian | Ignas Miškinis | Not nominated |
| Luxembourg | Breathing Underwater | Hors d’haleine | French, Luxembourgish, Spanish, Italian | Eric Lamhène | Not nominated |
| Madagascar | Disco Afrika: A Malagasy Story | Disco Afrika: tantara malagasy | Malagasy | Luck Razanajaona | Not nominated |
| Malaysia | Pavane for an Infant | 搖籃凡世 | Cantonese, Malay, English, Mandarin, Southern Malaysian Hokkien | Chong Keat Aun | Not nominated |
| Mexico | We Shall Not Be Moved | No nos moverán | Spanish | Pierre Saint-Martin Castellanos | Not nominated |
| Mongolia | Silent City Driver | Чимээгүй хотын жолооч | Mongolian | Janchivdorj Sengedorj | Not nominated |
| Montenegro | The Tower of Strength | Obraz | Albanian, Montenegrin, Croatian, Serbian, German | Nikola Vukčević | Not nominated |
| Morocco | Calle Málaga | | Spanish, Arabic | Maryam Touzani | Not nominated |
| Nepal | Anjila | एन्जिला | Nepali | Milan Chams | Not nominated |
| Netherlands | Reedland | Rietland | Dutch, Stellingwarfs | Sven Bresser | Not nominated |
| North Macedonia | The Tale of Silyan | Силјан | Macedonian | Tamara Kotevska | Not nominated |
| Norway | Sentimental Value | Affeksjonsverdi | Norwegian, English, Swedish, Danish | Joachim Trier | Won Academy Award |
| Palestine | Palestine 36 | فلسطين ٣٦ | Arabic, English | Annemarie Jacir | Made shortlist |
| Panama | Beloved Tropic | Querido trópico | Spanish | Ana Endara | Not nominated |
| Papua New Guinea | Papa Buka | | Tok Pisin, Hindi, English, Bengali | Dr. Biju | Not on the final list |
| Paraguay | Under the Flags, the Sun | Bajo las banderas, el sol | Guarani, Spanish, German, French, English, Brazilian Portuguese | Juanjo Pereira | Not nominated |
| Peru | Kinra | | Cuzco Quechua, Spanish | Marco Panatonic | Not nominated |
| Philippines | Magellan | Magalhães | Portuguese, Spanish, Cebuano, French, Latin | Lav Diaz | Not nominated |
| Poland | Franz | | German, Czech, Yiddish, English, French, Japanese | Agnieszka Holland | Not nominated |
| Portugal | Banzo | | Portuguese, Principense Creole | Margarida Cardoso | Not nominated |
| Romania | Traffic | Jaful secolului | Romanian, Dutch, English | Teodora Mihai | Not nominated |
| Saudi Arabia | Hijra | هجری | Arabic, Urdu, Turkish, English | Shahad Ameen | Not nominated |
| Senegal | Demba | | Pulaar | Mamadou Dia | Not on the final list |
| Serbia | Sun Never Again | Сунце никад више | Serbian | David Jovanović | Not nominated |
| Singapore | Stranger Eyes | 默視錄 | Mandarin, English, Singaporean Hokkien | Yeo Siew Hua | Not nominated |
| Slovakia | Father | Otec | Slovak | Tereza Nvotová | Not nominated |
| Slovenia | Little Trouble Girls | Kaj ti je deklica | Slovene | Urška Djukić | Not nominated |
| South Africa | The Heart Is a Muscle | | Kaaps, Afrikaans, English | Imran Hamdulay | Not nominated |
| South Korea | No Other Choice | 어쩔수가없다 | Korean, English | Park Chan-wook | Made shortlist |
| Spain | Sirāt | | Spanish, French, English, Arabic, Catalan | Oliver Laxe | Nominated |
| Sweden | Eagles of the Republic | نسور الجمهورية | Arabic | Tarik Saleh | Not nominated |
| Switzerland | Late Shift | Heldin | German, Swiss German, Turkish, French, Albanian | Petra Volpe | Made shortlist |
| Taiwan | Left-Handed Girl | 左撇子女孩 | Mandarin, Taiwanese Hokkien | Tsou Shih-ching | Made shortlist |
| Tajikistan | Black Rabbit, White Rabbit | Харгӯши сиёҳ, харгӯши сафед | Tajik, Russian, Persian | Shahram Mokri | Not on the final list |
| Thailand | A Useful Ghost | ผีใช้ได้ค่ะ | Thai, English, Isan, Teochew Min | Ratchapoom Boonbunchachoke | Disqualified |
| Tunisia | The Voice of Hind Rajab | صوت هند رجب | Arabic, English | Kaouther Ben Hania | Nominated |
| Turkey | One of Those Days When Hemme Dies | Hemme'nin Öldüğü Günlerden Biri | Turkish | Murat Fıratoğlu | Not nominated |
| Uganda | Kimote | | Luganda | Hassan Mageye | Not nominated |
| Ukraine | 2000 Meters to Andriivka | 2000 метрів до Андріївки | Ukrainian, English, Russian | Mstyslav Chernov | Not nominated |
| United Kingdom | My Father's Shadow | | Nigerian Pidgin, English, Yoruba | Akinola Davies Jr. | Not nominated |
| Uruguay | Don't You Let Me Go | Agarrame fuerte | Spanish | Ana Guevara and Leticia Jorge | Not nominated |
| Venezuela | Alí Primera | | Spanish | Daniel Yegres | Not nominated |
| Vietnam | Red Rain | Mưa đỏ | Vietnamese, English | Đặng Thái Huyền | Not nominated |

== Notes ==
- Cambodia reportedly submitted Tenement by Inrasothythep Neth and Sokyou Chea, but it did not appear on the final list of films sent to Academy voters.
- Iran's government-controlled Farabi Cinema Foundation submitted Cause of Death: Unknown by Ali Zarnegar, bypassing critic favorites including It Was Just an Accident by Jafar Panahi. After years of persecution and incarceration, Panahi made his film in secret without the Iranian government's permission. It was instead submitted by France, where it had been edited and co-financed. The dissident Iranian Independent Filmmaker Association, building on a statement from 2024, urged AMPAS "to reconsider its policies regarding film submissions from countries under autocratic rule." The statement held that "establishing an independent committee of global representatives — particularly those from Iran who are free from governmental affiliation — would facilitate a broader and more authentic representation of Iranian cinema".
- Kazakhstan submitted Cadet by Adilkhan Yerzhanov, but it was disqualified by the Academy due to a conflict of interest complaint from the League of Cinematographers of Kazakhstan. Yerkinbek Ptyraliev, a member of Kazakhstan's Oscar selection committee, was the cinematographer of Cadet.
- Kosovo's Cinematography Center announced that they had received one submission but that the five-person selection committee declined to send it because it "did not meet the competition standards for the 'Oscar' competition", leaving Kosovo without a candidate for the third year in a row. Some local filmmakers condemned the decision including director Isa Qosja, who directed Kosovo's first-ever Oscar submission in 2014. Qosja argued that "It is better to have Kosovo's name written as a participant than for three years for Kosovo's name not to exist at all in this important competition of cinematographic culture" and criticized relying on the opinion of "three or four people" regarding the unnamed film's Oscar prospects.
- Malta's Academy Selection Committee received one entry, Ciao Ciao by Keith Tedesco, but chose to make no submission. The committee told Tedesco that while the "film received positive reviews from local critics and audiences... an Oscar submission must be evaluated within its specific international context. With this in mind, the committee felt that the film was not positioned strongly enough to be put forward." Tedesco called the decision "incompetence." The Malta Entertainment Industry and Arts Association and the Malta Producers Association, which jointly organize the selection committee, defended the decision in a statement saying Malta does not send a submission every year and there "is nothing exceptional about this year."
- Nepal's Oscar selection committee announced Anjila by Milan Chams as their submission. Local filmmakers, raising concerns about procedural violations, conflicts of interest and a committee operating in secrecy during a time of civil unrest, filed a formal complaint with AMPAS. Chams countered that the filmmakers who filed the complaint appeared "to be driven more by personal interest than by objective critique."
- Papua New Guinea formed an Oscar selection committee for the first time and reportedly submitted Papa Buka by Dr. Biju, but it did not appear on the final list of films sent to Academy voters.
- Senegal reportedly submitted Demba by Mamadou Dia, but it did not appear on the final list of films sent to Academy voters.
- Tajikistan reportedly submitted Black Rabbit, White Rabbit by Shahram Mokri, but it did not appear on the final list of films sent to Academy voters.
- Thailand submitted A Useful Ghost by Ratchapoom Boonbunchachoke, but it was deemed ineligible by the Academy. Required information was not provided during the submission process, though attempts to correct it were made after the deadline had passed. The film's production company characterized it as a communication and coordination error.
- The Oscar selection committees for Cameroon, Guatemala, Nigeria, Pakistan and Sudan invited filmmakers to make submissions, but did not end up sending a film. Rwanda and Zimbabwe formed selection committees for the first time, but also did not end up sending films. Algeria, Kenya and Namibia asked for submissions, but announced they had no films eligible for entry.
