= Reihane Taravati =

Iranian photographer

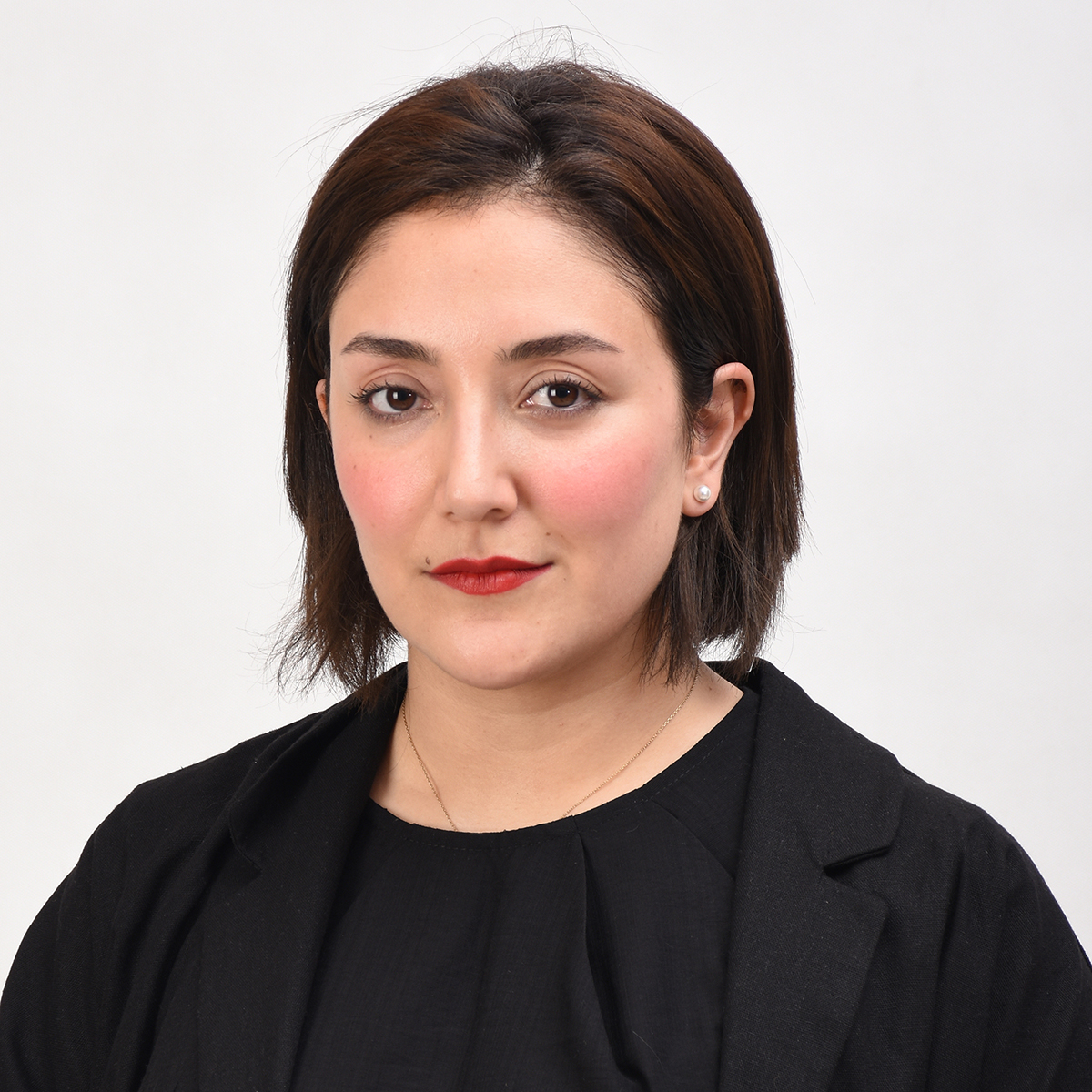
- Born: March 19, 1991 (age 34); Mashhad, Razavi Khorasan province, Iran
- Education: Industrial design
- Alma mater: University of Art, Tehran
- Occupation: blogger - Photographer
- Website: Official website

Reihane Taravati is an Iranian photographer and activist. She is the founder of "Reihanet Studio", which specializes in social media content production.

Her work as an activist has brought attention to social and political issues. She is recognized for her contributions to women's rights.

She has been arrested and imprisoned multiple times.

== Press ==
- 10 Officers raided the home of freelance photojournalist Reihane Taravati in Tehran
- Videographer Reihane Taravati Arrested
- 6 young Iranians were arrested for ‘Happy’ video freed
