= Cause of Death: Unknown =

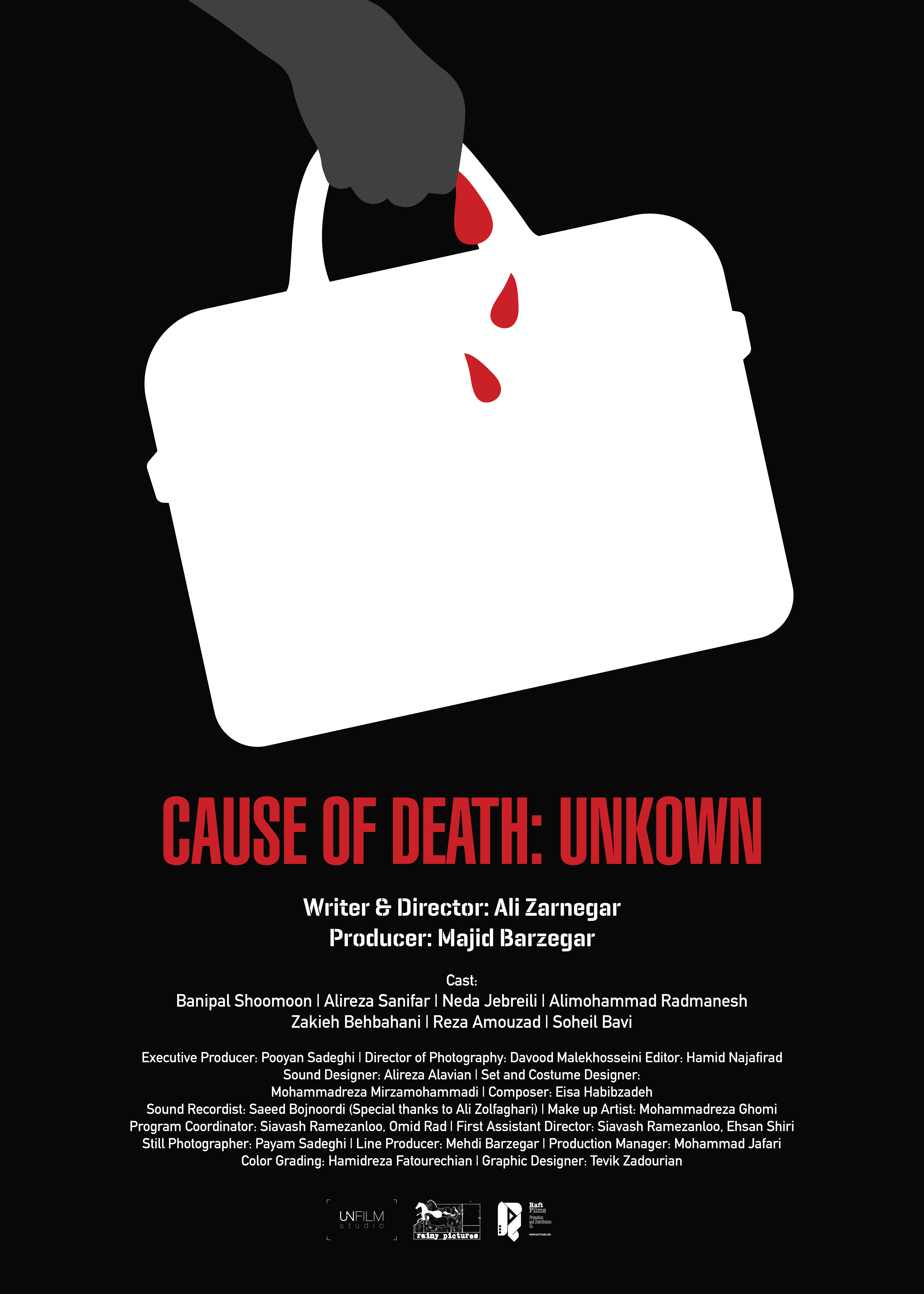
- International promotional poster
- Persian: علت مرگ: نامعلوم
- Directed by: Ali Zarnegar
- Screenplay by: Ali Zarnegar
- Produced by: Majid Barzegar
- Starring: Banipal Shoomoon; Alireza Sanifar; Neda Jebraeili; Ali Mohammad Radmanesh; Zakieh Behbahani; Reza Amouzad; Soheil Bavi
- Cinematography: Davood Malek Hosseini
- Edited by: Hamid Najafirad
- Music by: Easa Habibzadeh
- Production company: Rainy Pictures
- Distributed by: Raft Films
- Release date: 13 June 2023 (Shanghai)
- Running time: 104 minutes
- Country: Iran
- Language: Persian

Cause of Death: Unknown (Persian: علت مرگ: نامعلوم, romanized: Ellat-e Marg: Nâmaloum); is a 2023 Iranian drama road movie written and directed by Ali Zarnegar and produced by Majid Barzegar. Starring Banipal Shoomoon, Alireza Sanifar, and Neda Jebraeili, the film follows seven passengers traveling across Iran’s Lut Desert whose overnight journey is disrupted when one of them dies suddenly, forcing the group into a tense moral dilemma after discovering a hidden sum of money on the body.

The film premiered at the Shanghai International Film Festival on 13 June 2023, where it won the Best Cinematography Award in the Asian New Talent Competition. It later screened at major international festivals such as the Hof International Film Festival in Germany, the Torino Underground Cinefest in Italy, and the Iranian Film Festival Zurich, where it won the Golden Cyrus Cylinder for Best Feature Film. Zarnegar received multiple national honors, including Best Director and Best Original Screenplay from the Iran’s Film Critics and Writers Association in 2025.

It was also selected by the Farabi Cinema Foundation as the Iranian official submission for the Academy Award for Best International Feature Film at the 98th Academy Awards, but it was not nominated.

== Plot ==
A van carrying seven passengers travels across Iran’s vast Lut Desert when their journey takes an unexpected turn after one of the travelers dies suddenly. With no medical professional available to issue a death certificate, the group’s call for help is denied, leaving them stranded in the middle of nowhere.

As night falls, they search the deceased’s belongings in the hope of finding an identity or contact information, but what they discover instead deepens their crisis. Fear, suspicion, and moral tension begin to divide the group as they struggle to decide what is right—and what will keep them alive until morning.

== Themes ==
The film’s central theme is a moral crossroads where ordinary people must choose between ethical integrity and personal gain under dire pressure. Critics have noted that Cause of Death: Unknown uses its desert-set thriller premise to explore human ethics and survival instinct when societal rules break down. The anonymous corpse and the bag of money serve as symbols that test each character’s conscience, highlighting how greed can challenge humanity and solidarity in moments of crisis.

Beyond the immediate moral dilemma, the film offers a broader reflection on contemporary Iranian society. Reviewers observed that it portrays “social realities of the era” and the struggle to uphold morality and humanity amid hardship. Themes of trust and betrayal run throughout the story, as the travelers—who start as strangers—realize that “no one truly knows anyone” when faced with high-stakes decisions.

Some commentary interprets the scenario as a universal parable of marginalization and migration: the dead traveler’s unknown identity and the presence of a Baloch woman among the group hint at those living on society’s fringes, suggesting the film is “not merely about an anonymous corpse, but a reflection on migration and marginalization” in a broader human context.

Through sparse, claustrophobic storytelling, Ali Zarnegar imbues the narrative with social criticism yet avoids overt political slogans, focusing instead on the characters’ internal ethical struggles.

== Cast ==
- Banipal Shoomoon as Ahmad, the van driver
- Alireza Sanifar as Naser, a passenger
- Neda Jebraeili as Bahar, a passenger
- Ali Mohammad Radmanesh as Majid, a passenger
- Zakieh Behbahani as Najveh, a passenger
- Reza Amouzad as Esmaeil, a passenger
- Soheil Bavi as Peyman, a passenger
- Saeed Rezaeikia as the body, the deceased traveler
- Mansour Ghanijahed as Policeman
- Mohammadreza Hosseinian as Policeman
- Ashkan Ashoori as Driver
- Sahar Babaei as Baloch woman (cameo)

The film’s ensemble nature gives each performer a distinct role within the confined setting. Many of the cast are active figures in Iran’s independent theater and film scene.

== Production ==
Cause of Death: Unknown was written and directed by Ali Zarnegar, marking his feature directorial debut. Zarnegar, born in Tehran in 1983, had previously gained recognition as a poet and screenwriter. He was twice nominated for Best Screenplay at the Fajr Film Festival — first for Wednesday, May 9 (2014) and later for No Date, No Signature (2016), the latter winning multiple international awards including the Best Writing Prize at the Stockholm International Film Festival.

The film was produced by Majid Barzegar, a leading figure in Iranian independent cinema known for Parviz (2012) and The Rain Falls Where It Will (2020). Barzegar described the screenplay as “exceptionally precise and tightly woven,” noting that its minimal setting allowed for “a rare moral intensity.” The production was handled by Rainy Pictures, with Raft Films overseeing international sales and distribution.

Cinematography was led by Davood Malek-Hosseini, whose stark compositions capture both the vast emptiness of the Lut Desert and the claustrophobic confines of the van. His work won the Best Cinematography Award at the 2023 Shanghai International Film Festival’s Asian New Talent Competition. The film’s editing was done by Hamid Najafirad, with a subtle score by Easa Habibzadeh, and sound design by Alireza Alavian, one of Iran’s most acclaimed sound mixers.

According to reports, the film was initially accepted into the 40th Fajr International Film Festival (2022) but was later removed from the lineup by Iranian authorities days before screening, for undisclosed reasons. Zarnegar criticized the decision, stating that “social cinema reflects society” and that silencing filmmakers only deepens public disillusionment. Despite these challenges, the film was completed independently and became a symbol of artistic perseverance within Iran’s restrictive film environment.

== Release ==
The film had its world premiere on 13 June 2023 at the Shanghai International Film Festival in the Asian New Talent competition, where it later won Best Cinematography for Davood Malek-Hosseini. Its European premiere took place at the Hof International Film Festival in Germany in October 2023.

In 2024 the film continued its festival run across Europe and North America: it screened at the Salento International Film Festival (Italy), the Torino Underground Cinefest (Italy) — where it won Best Film —, the Iranian Film Festival Zurich (Switzerland), the Girona Film Festival (Spain), the Pigeon International Film Festival (Iceland), and the Monadnock International Film Festival (United States). In September 2024, it won the Golden Cyrus Cylinder (Best Feature Film) at IFF Zurich.

In 2025, the film received the Audience Favorite Film Award at the 3rd Iranian Film Festival New York. It was later selected by the Farabi Cinema Foundation as Iran’s official submission for the 98th Academy Awards.

== Response ==
=== Critical reception ===
Cause of Death: Unknown received broadly positive reviews for its restrained realism, moral depth, and ensemble performances, though a few critics cited its slow pacing.

Cinema Without Borders published two in-depth reviews that praised the film’s craftsmanship and ethical scope. The first called it “a significant work in a bleak and trying time when the talents and potential of Iranian cinema are being recklessly squandered by the dominance of superficial comedies,” describing it as “a thoughtful, well-crafted social drama” with “creative use of lighting, color, and sound.” In a later article titled Iran’s Oscar Selection: Cause of Death: Unknown, the same outlet hailed it as “a powerful and unsettling exploration of social prejudice and the machinery of othering,” arguing that the film “forces audiences to confront their own assumptions about ethnicity and human worth.” It further praised its “austere visual language and near-total absence of music,” which “sharpen the ethical unease and keep the audience uncomfortably present.”

The Tehran Times described the film as “a portrait of social realities and the difficulty of remaining humane under pressure,” noting that it “balances suspense with ethical inquiry.” Iran International called it “a study of human nature when institutional structures fail,” praising its realism and moral tension.

Writing for International Feature, a reviewer observed that “the power of the film lies in its stillness,” highlighting Zarnegar’s ability “to draw meaning out of silence and space” and describing the film as “less about the mystery of a corpse and more about the mysteries of the living.” The piece emphasized that Cause of Death: Unknown “refuses the easy satisfaction of explanation,” calling it “cinema that demands we sit with ambiguity.”

In a mixed review, Asian Movie Pulse critic Don Anelli described the film as “a serviceable if unremarkable feature,” praising its “intriguing premise and sweeping sense of mood,” while faulting its “underwhelming pacing and long stretches of dialogue.”

Following the film’s Oscar submission announcement, The Hollywood Reporter and Variety both cited it among the year’s most notable Iranian releases. Variety wrote that “its low-key style and moral tension distinguish it within Iran’s contemporary cinema,” while The Hollywood Reporter praised its “haunting simplicity and human depth.”

Overall, critics commended Zarnegar’s precision, Davood Malek-Hosseini’s cinematography, and the cast’s understated performances. The film’s moral ambiguity and quiet intensity led several reviewers to compare its tone to Iranian dramas such as No Date, No Signature and A Separation, identifying Zarnegar as one of the most promising new voices in Iran’s contemporary cinema.

=== Accolades ===
Award	Date of ceremony	Category	Recipient(s)	Result
Shanghai International Film Festival	2023	‌Best Film	Ali Zarnegar	Nominated
Shanghai International Film Festival	2023	‌Best Director	Ali Zarnegar	Nominated
Shanghai International Film Festival	2023	‌Best Cinematogeraphy	Davood Malek Hosseini	Won
Shanghai International Film Festival	2023	‌Best Director	Ali Mohammad Radmanesh	Nominated
Hof International Film Festival	2023	‌Best Film	Ali Zarnegar	Nominated
Salento International Film Festival	2024	‌Best Film	Ali Zarnegar	Nominated
Torino Underground Cinefest	2024	‌Best Film	Ali Zarnegar	Won
Monadnock International Film Festival	2024	‌Best Film	Ali Zarnegar	Nominated
The Pigeon International Film Festival (PIFF)	2024	‌Best Film	Ali Zarnegar	Nominated
Girona International Film Festival	2024	‌Best Film	Ali Zarnegar	Nominated
Iranian Film Festival of Zürich (IFFZ)	2024	‌Best Film	Ali Zarnegar	Won
ÍRÁN:CI Film Festival	2024	‌Best Film	Ali Zarnegar	Nominated
Iranian Film Festival New York	2024	‌Best Film	Ali Zarnegar	Nominated
Iran Cinema Celebration	2025	‌Best Film	Majid Barzegar	Won
Iran Cinema Celebration	2025	‌Best Director	Ali Zarnegar	Won
Iran Cinema Celebration	2025	Best Screenplay	Ali Zarnegar	Won
Iran Cinema Celebration	2025	Best Actor	Banipal Shomon	Won
Iran Cinema Celebration	2025	Best Actor in a Supporting Role	Alireza Sanifar	Won
Iran Cinema Celebration	2025	Best Sound	Alireza Alavian	Nominated
Iran's Film Critics and Writers Association	2025	‌Best Performance by an Actress in a Supporting Role (Jury Prize)	Zakieh Behbahani	Nominated
Iran's Film Critics and Writers Association	2025	‌Best Performance by an Actor in a Supporting Role (Jury Prize)	Alireza Sanifar	Nominated
Iran's Film Critics and Writers Association	2025	Best Performance by an Actor in a Supporting Role (Jury Prize)	Ali Mohammad Radmanesh	Nominated
Iran's Film Critics and Writers Association	2025	Best Achievement in Directing (Jury Prize)	Ali Zarnegar	Won
Iran's Film Critics and Writers Association	2025	Best Original Screenplay (Jury Prize)	Ali Zarnegar	Won
Iran's Film Critics and Writers Association	2025	Best Motion Picture of the Year (Jury Prize)	Majid Barzegar	Won
Iran's Film Critics and Writers Association	2025	Best Performance by an Actor in a Leading Role (Special Prize)	Banipal Shoomoon	Won
Iran's Film Critics and Writers Association	2025	Best Performance by an Actor in a Supporting Role (Special Prize)	Alireza Sanifar	Won
Iran's Film Critics and Writers Association	2025	Best Performance by an Actor in a Leading Role (Jury Prize)	Banipal Shoomoon	Nominated

== See also ==
- List of submissions to the 98th Academy Awards for Best International Feature Film
- List of Iranian submissions for the Academy Award for Best International Feature Film
