= Papa Buka =

2025 Papua New Guinea drama film

- Directed by: Dr. Biju
- Written by: Dr. Biju; Daniel Jonerdhagtt
- Produced by: Noelene Taula Wunum; Akshay Parija; Pa. Ranjith; Prakash Bare
- Starring: Sine Boboro; Ritabhari Chakraborty; Prakash Bare
- Cinematography: Yedhu Radhakrishnan
- Edited by: Davis Manuel
- Music by: Ricky Kej
- Production companies: NAFA Productions; Akshay Parija Productions; Neelam Productions; Silicon Media
- Release date: 19 September 2025; (Papua New Guinea)
- Running time: 101 minutes
- Countries: Papua New Guinea; India
- Languages: Tok Pisin; English; Hindi; Bengali

Papa Buka is a 2025 drama film co-written and directed by Dr. Biju. Starring Sine Boboro in the titular role, it follows an elderly war veteran, who helps two Indian historians discover forgotten World War II events that link India and Papua New Guinea through acts of bravery and kindness.

The film premiered on 19 September 2025 in Papua New Guinea. The timing of the film release is significant as Papua New Guinea’s 50th year of independence was celebrated on 16 September 2025. It was also selected as the first ever submission of Papua New Guinea for the Best International Feature Film at the 98th Academy Awards, but was not on the list of films accepted by the academy.

== Synopsis ==
Two Indian historians, Romila Chatterjee and Anand Kunhiraman, travel to Port Moresby in Papua New Guinea to research and write a book about Indian soldiers who served alongside British and Australian forces during World War II, fighting against the Japanese. In their search for firsthand accounts, they meet Papa Buka, an 80-year-old war veteran from the Kokoda Track campaign. He becomes their guide, leading them through remote jungle villages where they interview other veterans and collect memories of the war. As their journey unfolds, they encounter surprising and unforeseen events.

== Cast ==
- Sine Boboro as Papa Buka
- Ritabhari Chakraborty as Romila Chatterjee
- Prakash Bare as Anand Kunhiraman
- John Sike as Sike Yuants
- Barbara Anatu as National Museum Officer
- Jacob Oburi
- Sandra Dauma as Wahu
- Max Maso PPC as Sogeri Police Commander

== Production ==
The film was officially announced in May 2024 by Inbasekar Sundaramurti, Indian High Commissioner to Papua New Guinea and Solomon Islands. Papa Buka is the first Papua New Guinea–India co-produced feature film, marking a milestone in cinematic collaboration between the two countries and Papua New Guinea's representation at major international film festivals. Noelene Taula Wunum of Papua New Guinea and Indian producers Akshay Parija, Pa. Ranjith, and Prakash Bare serve as producers, with Parul Agarwal as executive producer. The production is supported by the Papua New Guinea Ministry of Tourism, Arts and Culture, the National Cultural Commission, and the High Commission of India.

In 2024, Ritabhari Chakraborty was selected as the female lead. The film also stars Prakash Bare, Sine Boboro, and John Sike. Indian cinematographer Yedhu Radhakrishnan makes his feature debut with the project.

Principal photography began in mid-August 2024 across various locations in Papua New Guinea, including Port Moresby and the Varirata National Park. Filming wrapped in September 2024. Shot through a very crisp shoot schedule, Papa Buka had its post production done in India.

The beginning credits highlight the significant institutional, governmental, and cultural support behind the production. Special acknowledgments are given to the Government of Papua New Guinea, Prime Minister James Marape, and Belden Namah, Minister for Tourism, Arts and Culture. Additional thanks extend to the Government of India, High Commission of India in Papua New Guinea, as well as Jason Waviha Peter (Minister for Community Development, Youth and Religion), Jerry Ubase (Secretary, DFCDR), Steven Enomb Kilanda (executive director, National Cultural Commission), and Karan Rana of Adzguru (PNG) Ltd., Papua New Guinea. Contributions were also recognized from cultural and academic institutions such as the National Film Institute, National Museum and Art Gallery, National Library and Archives, University of Papua New Guinea, Pacific Adventist University, and others.

The film is a co-production of NAFA Productions, Akshay Parija Productions, Neelam Productions, and Silicon Media. It is directed and written by Dr. Biju.

The film is positioned as Papua New Guinea's official entry to the 98th Academy Awards in 2026.

== Music ==
The original score for Papa Buka was composed by Ricky Kej, a three-time Grammy Award-winning Indian musician and United Nations Goodwill Ambassador. Kej stated that he studied "raw tribal music, indigenous instruments, jungle sounds, rhythms, archival recordings and natural sound-scapes" to create a score rooted in Papua New Guinea's cultural and historical traditions. According to Hindustan Times, the score was praised for its ability to heighten the film's emotional tone while remaining subtle and closely aligned with the narrative.

== Release ==
Papa Buka had its world premiere on 18 September 2025 in Port Moresby, Papua New Guinea, in a grand event attended by Prime Minister James Marape, cabinet ministers, ambassadors, and representatives of the creative community. The following day, the film was given a theatrical release across Papua New Guinea, marking the country's first Oscar-qualifying cinema release.

The PNG Oscar Selection Committee formally announced the film as the country's first-ever submission to the Academy Awards in the Best International Feature Film category. This milestone coincided with the nation's 50th anniversary of independence, giving the release a symbolic cultural significance.

The film will have its International premiere at the Minsk International Film Festival and compete in the Main Competition Fiction Films in November 2025.

The film was screened at the International Film Festival of Kerala (IFFK) on 13 December 2025.

== Oscar submission ==
In August 2025, Papa Buka was selected by the Papua New Guinea Oscar Selection Committee as the country's first-ever official submission to the Academy Award for Best International Feature Film at the 98th Academy Awards. The announcement was made in Port Moresby by the Minister for Tourism, Arts and Culture, Belden Norman Namah, alongside National Cultural Commission Executive Director Steven Enomb Kilanda and committee chairman Dr. Don Niles. The committee described the film as a “pioneering cinematic collaboration between Papua New Guinea and India” that would showcase the nation's cultural heritage to a global audience.

== Festival selections and awards ==
- Winner of the Special Jury Diploma at the 31st Minsk International Film Festival Listapad (2025).
- Official Selection in the Red Carpet Gala section of the 56th International Film Festival of India (IFFI), Goa (2025).
- Official Selection in the World Cinema section of the 30th International Film Festival of Kerala (IFFK) (2025).
- Official Selection in the International Competition section of the 24th Dhaka International Film Festival (2026).
- Official Selection in the Asian Competition section of the 22nd Third Eye Asian Film Festival, Mumbai (2026).
- Official Selection in the International Competition section of the 24th Pune International Film Festival (PIFF) (2026).
- Official Selection in the Oriental Express and Directors' Week competition sections of the 46th Fantasporto – Oporto International Film Festival (2026).
- Official Selection as the closing film of the Cinema at Sea – Okinawa Pan-Pacific International Film Festival, Japan (2026), in the Homecoming section.

== See also ==
- List of submissions to the 98th Academy Awards for Best International Feature Film
- List of Papua New Guinean submissions for the Academy Award for Best International Feature Film
