= Cadet (film) =

2025 Kazakh horror film

- Theatrical release poster
- Kazakh: Кадет
- Directed by: Adilkhan Yerzhanov
- Screenplay by: Adilkhan Yerzhanov
- Produced by: Damir Yedilov
- Starring: Anna Starchenko; Sharip Serik; Ratmir Yusupzhanov; Alexei Shemes
- Cinematography: Yerkinbek Pturaliyev
- Edited by: Arif Tleuzhanov
- Music by: Sandro Di Stefano
- Production company: Tiger Films
- Release dates: 1 November 2024 (Tokyo); 2 January 2025 (Kazakstan)
- Running time: 126 minutes
- Country: Kazakhstan
- Languages: Kazakh; Russian

Cadet (Kazakh: Кадет) is a 2024 Kazakhstani horror film written and directed by Adilkhan Yerzhanov. The film follows Alina and her son Serik, as she begins teaching history at a prestigious military academy, where his son also enrolls as a cadet. Serik struggles to fit in amid the rigid rules and cold environment, and soon finds himself facing bullying from his peer.

It has its world premiere in International Competition at the 37th Tokyo International Film Festival on 1 November 2024. It was released in Kazakhstani cinemas on 2 January 2025.

The film was selected to represent Kazakhstan in the Best International Feature Film category at the 98th Academy Awards, but was not on the list of films accepted by the academy.

== Synopsis ==
Alina, a history teacher, relocates with her son Serik to a remote part of Kazakhstan to work at a prestigious military cadet school. Serik struggles to fit in due to his gentle personality, facing rejection and bullying from classmates. Despite warnings from another parent, later revealed to be deceased, Alina remains determined to help her son succeed, even as he suffers under the school's harsh discipline and pressure to conform.

The discovery of a student's bloodied body triggers a police investigation, with Serik unexpectedly implicated. Soon after, Serik undergoes a dramatic transformation, excelling in military training and adopting the school's rigid ideals, which deeply unsettles Alina. As strange and supernatural events unfold, the investigator, who was skeptical initially joins Alina and Serik in exploring the school's basement, hoping to uncover the truth behind its disturbing influence.

== Cast ==
- Anna Starchenko
- Sharip Serik
- Ratmir Yusupzhanov
- Alexei Shemes
- Bakytzhan Kaptogay

== Production ==
The film was shot during the year 2024.

== Release ==
Cadet competed at the 37th Tokyo International Film Festival and had its world premiere on 1 November 2024. It had its European premiere in the Forum section of the 75th Berlin International Film Festival on 18 February 2025.

On 11 April 2024, it was presented in the Kaleidoscope Midnight Heat section of the 49th Hong Kong International Film Festival.

The film was also screened in the Afterhours section of the 59th Karlovy Vary International Film Festival in July 2025

== Reception ==
Panos Kotzathanasis reviewing for Asian Movie Pulse at Berlinale, praised the chemistry between Anna Starchenko as Alina and Serik Sharipov as Serik and cinematography of Yerkinbek Pturaliyev. He wrote, "cinematography captures the suffocating setting with artistry and is definitely among the best aspects here." Concluding he opined that the film was a "competent effort" but it "didn't not reach the level of Yerzhanov's previous works."

== Accolades ==
Award	Date of ceremony	Category	Recipient	Result	Ref.
Tokyo International Film Festival	6 November 2024	Grand Prix	Cadet	Nominated	
Asian Film Awards	2025	Best Sound	Zurab Kurmanbayev	Nominated	

== See also ==
- List of submissions to the 98th Academy Awards for Best International Feature Film
- List of Kazakhstani submissions for the Academy Award for Best International Feature Film
