= Ali Zarnegar =

Iranian screenwriter and film director

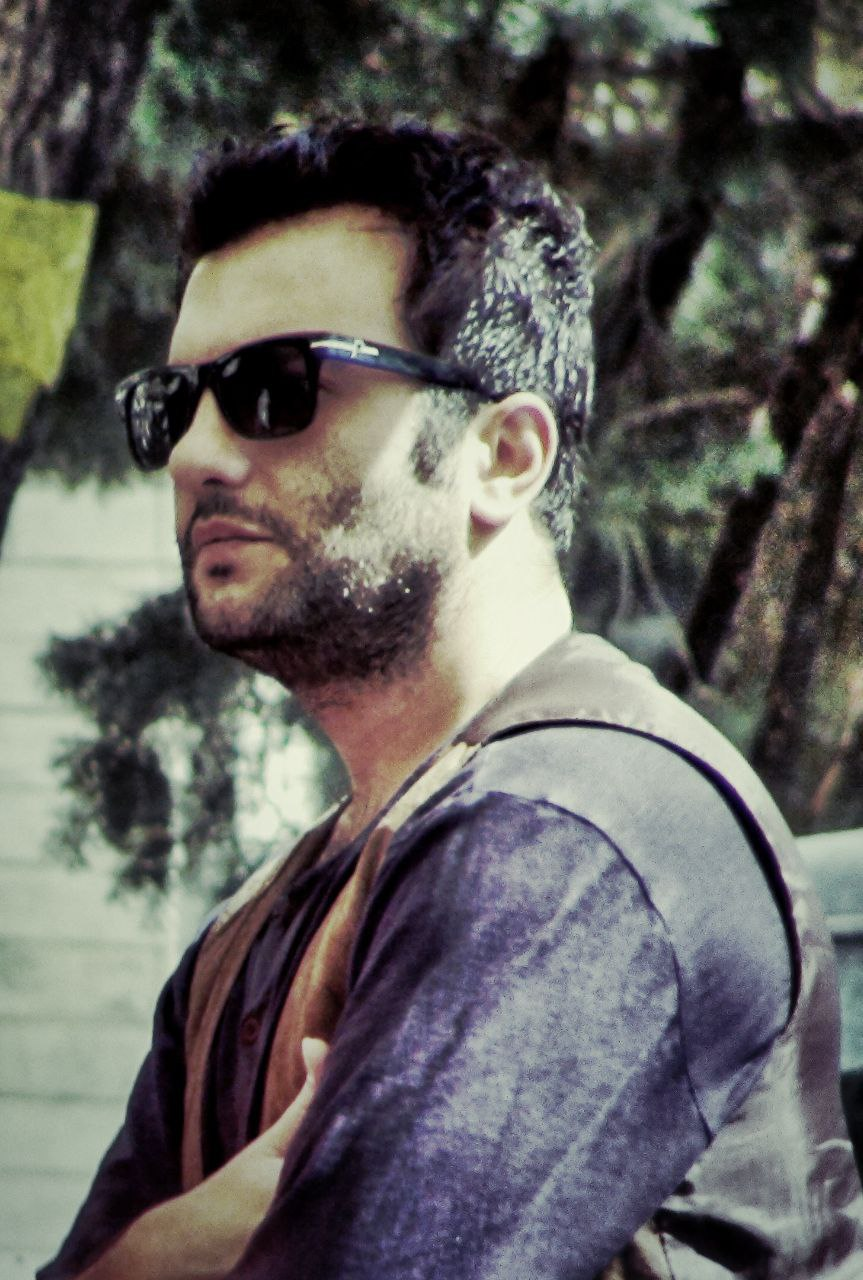
- Born: January 20, 1983; Tehran, Iran
- Education: Tehran University of Art (B.A. in Film Directing); Tarbiat Modares University (M.A. in Dramatic Literature)
- Occupations: Film director, Screenwriter, Poet, Playwright
- Years active: 2001–present
- Organizations: Iranian Screenwriters Guild; Iranian Playwrights Association
- Notable work: No Date, No Signature (2017) • Cause of Death: Unknown (2023)
- Awards: Stockholm International Film Festival – Best Screenplay for No Date, No Signature (2017); Turin Underground Film Festival – Best Feature Film for Cause of Death: Unknown (2024); Zurich Iranian Film Festival – Golden Cylinder Award for Best Film, Cause of Death: Unknown (2024); Iranian Film Critics and Writers Association – Best Film & Best Screenplay for Cause of Death: Unknown (2025); Iranian Cinema Celebration – Best Director & Best Screenplay for Cause of Death: Unknown (2025)

Ali Zarnegar (born 1983 in Tehran, Iran) is an Iranian film director, screenwriter, poet, playwright, and instructor of screenwriting. He began his career by making several acclaimed short films before gaining recognition as the screenwriter of Wednesday, May 9 (2015) and No Date, No Signature (2017). The latter earned Zarnegar the Best Screenplay Award at the 2017 Stockholm International Film Festival.

Zarnegar made his feature directorial debut with Cause of Death: Unknown (2023), which he also wrote. The film premiered at the Shanghai International Film Festival where it was nominated in four categories, winning the award for Best Cinematography. It later won Best Director and Best Screenplay at the 2025 Iranian Cinema Celebration, as well as the Golden Cylinder Award for Best Film at the 2024 Zurich Iranian Film Festival. Cause of Death: Unknown was also selected as Iran's official submission for the 2026 Academy Awards in the Best International Feature Film category.

== Early life and education ==
Ali Zarnegar was born in 1983 in Tehran, Iran. He studied film directing at the Tehran University of Art and later earned a master's degree in dramatic literature from Tarbiat Modares University.

In university, Zarnegar worked in poetry, playwriting, and cinema. He became an official member of both the Iranian Playwrights Association and the Iranian Screenwriters Guild. In the 2000s, he directed his first short films, including Becoming (2007) and Each Other (2015), which received recognition at the Tehran International Short Film Festival. Becoming won honorary diplomas for Best Film and Best Screenplay at the festival's 27th edition.

Zarnegar was also active in literature. He has published a number of limited-edition poetry collections in which he blends lyrical language with philosophical and social reflection.

== Career ==
=== Early work and short films ===
Ali Zarnegar began his artistic career in 2001 with his debut short film The Short. Over the following years, he directed several other short films, including The First Note (2004), Becoming (2007), Was (2009), He (2009), Is (2010), and Each Other (2015).

His 2007 short film Becoming received critical recognition and won honorary diplomas for Best Film and Best Screenplay at the 27th Tehran International Short Film Festival. These early works established Zarnegar's reputation for combining poetic imagery with social and existential themes, a style that would later characterize his feature films.

=== Playwriting and theatre ===
Since the 2010s, Zarnegar has also been active as a playwright. His play Love Is No Accident (Persian: Eshgh Etefaghi Nist Ke Biyoftad), written by Zarnegar and directed by Vahid Jalilvand, was staged at Tehran's Vahdat Hall in 2011.

Among his other dramatic works are Wound and Blow (Zakhm o Zakhmeh), Bahram Was Named After One, the War Remained, the Shame… (Bahram ra Nam Mande be Yeki Doval Bud, Mande Jang Jaye Nange…), and The End (Payan). Zarnegar's more recent plays, including Mongol: A Brief Tale of Narrow-Eyed Men and Kissing the Forehead Before Death, were performed as staged readings at the House of Art Moolian in 2023 and 2025.

=== Screenwriting ===
Zarnegar is also known for his work as a screenwriter in feature films. His writing credits include Living with the Presence of a Wall, Wednesday, May 9 (co-written with Vahid Jalilvand and Hossein Mahkam), No Date, No Signature (with Jalilvand), Bone Marrow, and Cause of Death: Unknown.

No Date, No Signature received the Best Screenplay Award at the Stockholm International Film Festival in 2017, while Bone Marrow was nominated for the Crystal Simorgh for Best Screenplay at the Fajr International Film Festival.

In addition to his original works, Zarnegar also served as a screenplay consultant on the drama film The Grassland.

=== Feature directorial debut ===
Zarnegar made his feature directorial debut with Cause of Death: Unknown (2023), which he also wrote. The film premiered at the Shanghai International Film Festival, where it won the award for Best Cinematography. It was subsequently screened at the Hof International Film Festival in Germany, the Zurich Iranian Film Festival, the Turin Underground Cinefest, and the Salento International Film Festival, collecting several awards including the Golden Cylinder Award for Best Film in Zurich and the Best Feature Film prize in Turin.

Cause of Death: Unknown received a limited theatrical release in Iran on December 26, 2024, where it was met with positive critical reception despite its small-scale distribution. Among the responses, acclaimed Iranian filmmaker Rakhshan Banietemad praised the film as “a powerful and honest work emerging from the heart of Iran’s independent cinema,” encouraging audiences to support it.

=== Literary and photography work ===
In addition to filmmaking, Zarnegar is also active in literature and photography. He has published several poetry collections, including Tuba, With Which Lip Do You Smile?, I Smell the Secret of an Old Stray Boar, This Friend Is Not the One I Have, and I Come from the Front of Your Shirt….

Zarnegar has also exhibited his photographic works in numerous galleries, such as Cafe Aks Gallery (2007), Samin Gallery (2007–2008), and Hasht-o-Nim Gallery (2008), as well as in several group exhibitions, including a 2020 photography showcase.

=== Themes ===
Ali Zarnegar's work often revolves around social drama, moral ambiguity, and philosophical reflections on guilt, conscience, and human responsibility. In both his screenplays and directed films, he frequently examines individuals under moral and psychological pressure. In films such as No Date, No Signature and Cause of Death: Unknown, Zarnegar employs a minimalist narrative style, sparse dialogue, and restrained performances to explore the tension between law and morality — where judgment, doubt, and remorse form the core of the drama.

Zarnegar's use of silence, enclosed spaces, and barren landscapes serves as visual metaphors for isolation and inner collapse. Cause of Death: Unknown is particularly noted for its austere desert imagery, in which the landscape becomes a symbolic reflection of moral emptiness and social abandonment. Several filmmakers and critics, including Rakhshan Banietemad and Shahram Mokri, have described the film as a sign of “the return of philosophical cinema in Iran.”

His literary and theatrical writings share the same philosophical tone and poetic language. Rather than focusing on external events, Zarnegar explores the inner mechanisms of human emotion and ethical decision-making. In his films, form and content operate simultaneously: silence, static framing, and slow rhythm have become integral elements of his cinematic signature within contemporary Iranian cinema.

== Awards and recognition ==
List of awards and nominations received by Ali Zarnegar
Year	Festival / Institution	Category	Work	Result	Ref.
2007	Tehran International Short Film Festival	Honorary Diploma – Best Film & Best Screenplay	Becoming	Won	
2015	San Francisco Iranian Film Festival	Best Screenplay (Documentary)	Cloning	Won	
2015	Fajr International Film Festival (33rd)	Best First Screenplay	Wednesday, May 9	Nominated	–
2017	Stockholm International Film Festival	Best Screenplay	No Date, No Signature	Won	
2017	Fajr International Film Festival (35th)	Best Screenplay	No Date, No Signature	Nominated	–
2017	Iranian Critics and Writers Association (11th)	Best Screenplay	No Date, No Signature	Nominated	–
2018	House of Cinema Awards (20th)	Best Screenplay	No Date, No Signature	Won	–
2018	Cinema Cinema Academy Awards (1st)	Best Screenplay	No Date, No Signature	Won	–
2020	Fajr International Film Festival (38th)	Best Screenplay	Bone Marrow	Nominated	–
2023	Imago International Film Festival (Italy)	“Billy Wilder” Award for Best Foreign Screenplay	Bone Marrow	Won	–
2023	Shanghai International Film Festival	Best Film (Asian New Talent Award)	Cause of Death: Unknown	Nominated	
2023	Shanghai International Film Festival	Best Director (Asian New Talent Award)	Cause of Death: Unknown	Nominated	
2023	Shanghai International Film Festival	Best Cinematography (Awarded to film)	Cause of Death: Unknown	Won	
2023	Hof International Film Festival (Germany)	Official Competition Selection	Cause of Death: Unknown	Nominated	
2024	Zurich Iranian Film Festival (10th)	Golden Cylinder Award – Best Film	Cause of Death: Unknown	Won	
2024	Turin Underground Cinefest	Best Feature Film	Cause of Death: Unknown	Won	
2025	Iranian Critics and Writers Association (15th)	Best Screenplay	Cause of Death: Unknown	Won	
2025	Iranian Critics and Writers Association (15th)	Best Director	Cause of Death: Unknown	Won	
2025	Iranian Cinema Celebration (24th)	Best Screenplay (Academy Award)	Cause of Death: Unknown	Won	–
2025	Iranian Cinema Celebration (24th)	Best Director (Academy Award)	Cause of Death: Unknown	Won	–
2026	Academy Awards	Iran's Official Submission – Best International Feature Film	Cause of Death: Unknown	Selected	
