= List of Malagasy submissions for the Academy Award for Best International Feature Film =

Best International Feature Film submissions from Madagascar

Highlights
- Debut: 2025
- Submissions: 1
- Nominations: none
- Oscar winners: none

Madagascar has submitted films for the Academy Award for Best International Feature Film since 2025. The award is handed out annually by the United States Academy of Motion Picture Arts and Sciences to a feature-length motion picture produced outside the United States that contains primarily non-English dialogue. The Academy of Motion Picture Arts and Sciences has invited the film industries of various countries to submit their best film for the Academy Award for Best Foreign Language Film since 1956. The Foreign Language Film Award Committee oversees the process and reviews all the submitted films. Following this, they vote via secret ballot to determine the five nominees for the award.

As of 2026, Madagascar has submitted only one film, Disco Afrika: A Malagasy Story (2025), but it was not nominated.

== Submissions ==
The Academy of Motion Picture Arts and Sciences has invited the film industries of various countries to submit their best film for the Academy Award for Best International Feature Film since 1956. The International Feature Film Committee oversees the process and reviews all the submitted films. Following this, they vote via secret ballot to determine the five nominees for the award.

Below is a list of the films that have been submitted by Madagascar by year, and its respective Academy Awards ceremony:

Year (Ceremony)	Film title used in nomination	Original title	Language(s)	Director(s)	Result
2025 (98th)	Disco Afrika: A Malagasy Story	Disco Afrika: une histoire malgache	Malagasy	Luck Razanajaona	Not nominated

== See also ==
- List of Academy Award winners and nominees for Best International Feature Film
- List of Academy Award-winning foreign language films
