= The Savage (miniseries) =

2025 Iranian series

- Persian: وحشی
- Genre: Drama; Thriller; Crime
- Created by: Houman Seyyedi
- Written by: Houman Seyyedi
- Directed by: Houman Seyyedi
- Starring: Javad Ezzati; Negar Javaherian
- Composers: Nick Reich; Jaro Messerschmidt
- Country of origin: Iran
- Original language: Persian
- No. of seasons: 2
- No. of episodes: 20

Production
- Producer: Mohammad Reza Saberi
- Cinematography: Morteza Najafi; Davood Malek
- Editor: Houman Seyyedi

Original release
- Network: Filmnet
- Release: 14 April 2025 – 24 February 2026

The Savage (Persian: وحشی, romanized: Vahshi) is a 2025 Iranian television series created by Houman Seyyedi, and starring Javad Ezzati as the lead character. The first episode premiered on Filmnet on 14 April 2025.

The Savage won the awards for Best Television Series and Best Television Director (Houman Seyyedi) at the 24th Hafez Awards. The series also received nominations for Best Television Screenplay, Best Actor in a Television Drama (Javad Ezzati), and Best Actress in a Television Drama (Negar Javaherian), among other categories.

== Season 1 ==
The first season follows Davood Ashraf, a mine worker whose life changes dramatically after he is arrested in connection with a murder. As the case unfolds, a series of events places him in direct conflict with the authorities, leading to a prolonged pursuit through the streets of Tehran. The season explores the consequences of crime, justice, and survival as Davood's circumstances gradually transform him into a fugitive.

== Season 2 ==
The second season continues the story of Davood Ashraf following the events of the first season. After his imprisonment and subsequent release, Davood becomes involved with a criminal organization led by Khosrow, forcing him further into Tehran's criminal underworld. As he attempts to evade both the authorities and his new adversaries, he finds himself drawn into a series of increasingly dangerous conflicts that threaten his future and personal relationships.

== Cast ==
- Javad Ezzati as Davood Ashraf
- Negar Javaherian as Raha Jahanshahi
- Houman Seyyedi as Khosrow
- Mehri Borjalizadeh as Davood's mother
- Atiyeh Javideh as Fotouhi's wife
- Alireza Sanifar as Movahedi
- Touraj Alvand
- Amin Shoarbaf
- Ehsan Amani as Nikmanesh
- Mehdi Sabaqi as Ramin
- Mohammad Saberi as Salim
- Yesna Gholari
- Nader Shahsavari as Davood's father
- Navid Pourfaraj as Forouhar
- Moein Shahcheraghi
- Negar Moghadam as Sara
- Seyyed Hassan Hosseinian as Faramarz Soltani
- Danial Najafi
- Zahra Maddadi as Shokoofeh
- Abolfazl Arab as Kamal
- Ehsan Mansouri as Saeed
- Kiashah Tangestanipour
- Ahmad Yavari-Shad as Fotouhi
- Ataneh Faghih Nasiri as Saatchi

== Awards and nominations ==
The following table lists the awards and nominations received by the series in 2025 (1404 SH).

=== Season 1 ===
Year	Award	Category	Recipient	Result
2025	24th Hafez Awards	Best Television Series	Mohammadreza Saberi	Won
2025	24th Hafez Awards	Best Television Director	Houman Seyyedi	Won
2025	24th Hafez Awards	Best Television Screenplay	Houman Seyyedi	Nominated
2025	24th Hafez Awards	Best Actor in a Television Drama	Javad Ezzati	Nominated
2025	24th Hafez Awards	Best Actress in a Television Drama	Negar Javaherian	Nominated
2025	24th Hafez Awards	Best Technical and Artistic Achievement (Television)	Houman Seyyedi & Peyvand Eqtesadi	Nominated
2025	24th Hafez Awards	Best Technical and Artistic Achievement (Television)	Azim Farayin	Nominated
2025	24th Hafez Awards	Best Technical and Artistic Achievement (Television)	Morteza Najafi	Nominated
2025	24th Hafez Awards	Best Technical and Artistic Achievement (Television)	Nik Reich & Jaro Messerschmidt	Nominated
2025	24th Hafez Awards	Best Theme Song Performer (Television)	Shervin Hajipour	Nominated
2025	24th Hafez Awards	Best Theme Song Performer (Television)	Heydoo Hedayati	Nominated
