= Disco Afrika: A Malagasy Story =

2023 Malagasy-language drama film

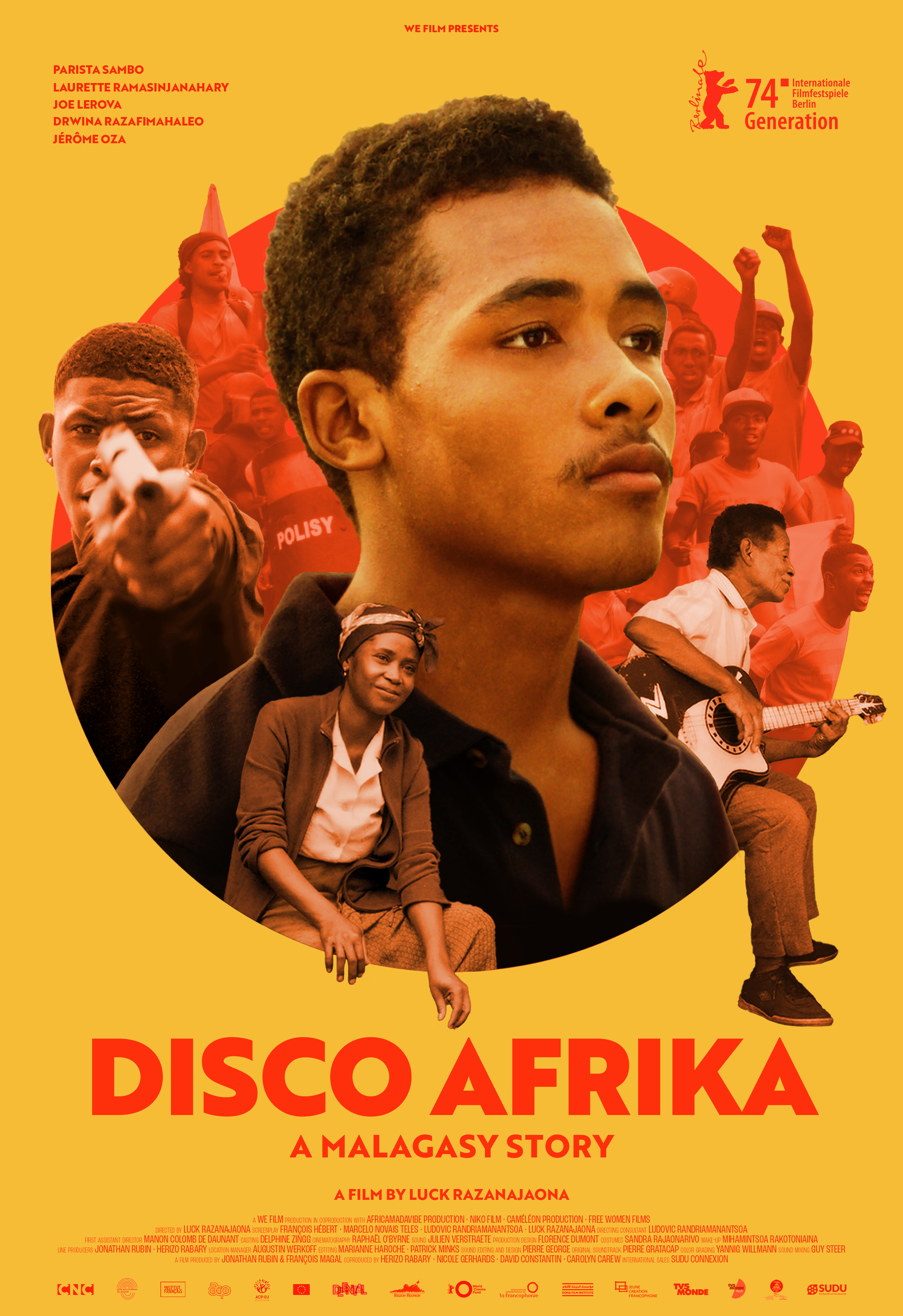
- International promotional poster
- Malagasy: Disco Afrika: tantara malagasy
- Directed by: Luck Razanajaona
- Written by: François Hébert; Marcelo Novais Teles; Ludovic Randriamanantsoa; Luck Razanajaona
- Produced by: Jonathan Rubin
- Starring: Parista Sambo; Laurette Ramasinjanahary; Joe Lerova; Drwina Razafimahaleo; Jérôme Oza
- Cinematography: Raphaël O’Byrne
- Edited by: Marianne Haroche; Patrick Minks
- Music by: Pierre Gratacap
- Production companies: WE FILM; Africamadavibe Production; NiKo FILM; Caméléon Production; Free Women Films
- Release date: November 30, 2023 (MIFF)
- Running time: 81 minutes
- Countries: France; Madagascar; Germany; Mauritius; Qatar; South Africa
- Language: Malagasy

Disco Afrika: A Malagasy Story (Malagasy: Disco Afrika: tantara malagasy) is a 2023 Malagasy-language drama film directed by Luck Razanajaona. He is also co-writer along with François Hébert, Marcelo Novais Teles and Ludovic Randriamanantsoa. It stars Parista Sambo, Laurette Ramasinjanahary, Joe Lerova and Drwina Razafimahaleo.

The film had its world premiere at the Marrakech International Film Festival on 30 November 2023. It also screened at the Generation section of the 74th Berlin International Film Festival on 19 February 2024, where it received an honorable mention from association of German Art House Cinemas jury.

It was selected as Madagascar's first-ever entry for the Best International Feature Film at the 98th Academy Awards, but it was not nominated.

== Synopsis ==
Twenty-year-old Kwame struggles to make a living in the clandestine sapphire mines and, prompted by an unexpected turn of events returns to his hometown. As he reunites with his mother and old friends, he finds himself confronted with the rampant corruption plaguing his country. Now, he will have to choose between easy money and loyalty—between individualism and political awakening.

== Cast ==
- Parista Sambo as Kwame
- Laurette Ramasinjanahary as Mama
- Joe Lerova as Idi
- Drwina Razafimahaleo as Bezara
- Jérôme Oza as Babaa

== Release ==
The film had its world premiere on 30 November 2023 at the Marrakech International Film Festival and its European premiere on 19 February 2024 at the 74th Berlin International Film Festival. It went on to screen at more than sixty film festivals including the Namur International Francophone Film Festival, Toronto Next Wave, New African Film Festival, and the Seattle International Film Festival. It was released theatrically in more than 10 territories, including Madagascar, France, the UK, Kenya, and West Africa.

== Reception ==
Fabien Lemercier reviewing the film at Berlinale for Cineuropa wrote that "Luck Razanajaona is providing the red island with its first ever selection for a major international festival courtesy of a local filmmaker. The film’s authentic roots, beneath its simple exterior, lend it a pure kind of charm as it paints a sharp portrait of the underbelly of a chaotic political-economic situation which invites all forms of trafficking and whose perilous democratic struggles are anything but recent. Attempting to capture the soul of Madagascar (its ancestral rites) and to make connections between eras so as to honour the island’s enduring spirit of resistance and denounce the collective chaos orchestrated to benefit the few, Luck Razanajaona delivers an engaged and highly enlightening film, making clever use of radio, songs and photos to fuel a very simple story. It’s a small theatre onto this world, in the guise of a coming-of-age tale, channelling universal ideas on oppression, corruption, revolution, and the dangerous choices which must be made to try to change things and find peace."

== See also ==
- List of submissions to the 98th Academy Awards for Best International Feature Film
- List of Malagasy submissions for the Academy Award for Best International Feature Film
