= Ballad of a White Cow =

2020 Iranian film

- Film poster
- Persian: قصیده گاو سفید
- Directed by: Behtash Sanaeeha; Maryam Moqadam
- Written by: Behtash Sanaeeha; Maryam Moqadam; Mehrdad Kouroshniya
- Produced by: Etienne de Ricaud; Gholamreza Moosavi
- Starring: Maryam Moqadam; Alireza Sanifar
- Cinematography: Amin Jafari
- Edited by: Ata Mehrad; Behtash Sanaeeha
- Production companies: Caracteres Productions; Filmsazan Cooperation
- Release date: February 1, 2020 (Fajr)
- Running time: 105 minutes
- Countries: Iran; France
- Language: Persian

Ballad of a White Cow (Persian: قصیده گاو سفید, romanized: Ghasideyeh gave sefid), released as Le pardon in France (Forgiveness), is a 2020 Iranian drama film co-directed by Behtash Sanaeeha and Maryam Moqadam, and co-written by Sanaeeha, Moqadam, and Mehrdad Kouroshniya.

The film had its worldwide premiere at the 38th Fajr Film Festival, and was screened at the 71st Berlin International Film Festival in March 2021.

== Plot ==
Mina's life is turned upside down when she learns that her husband was innocent of the crime for which he was executed.

== Cast ==
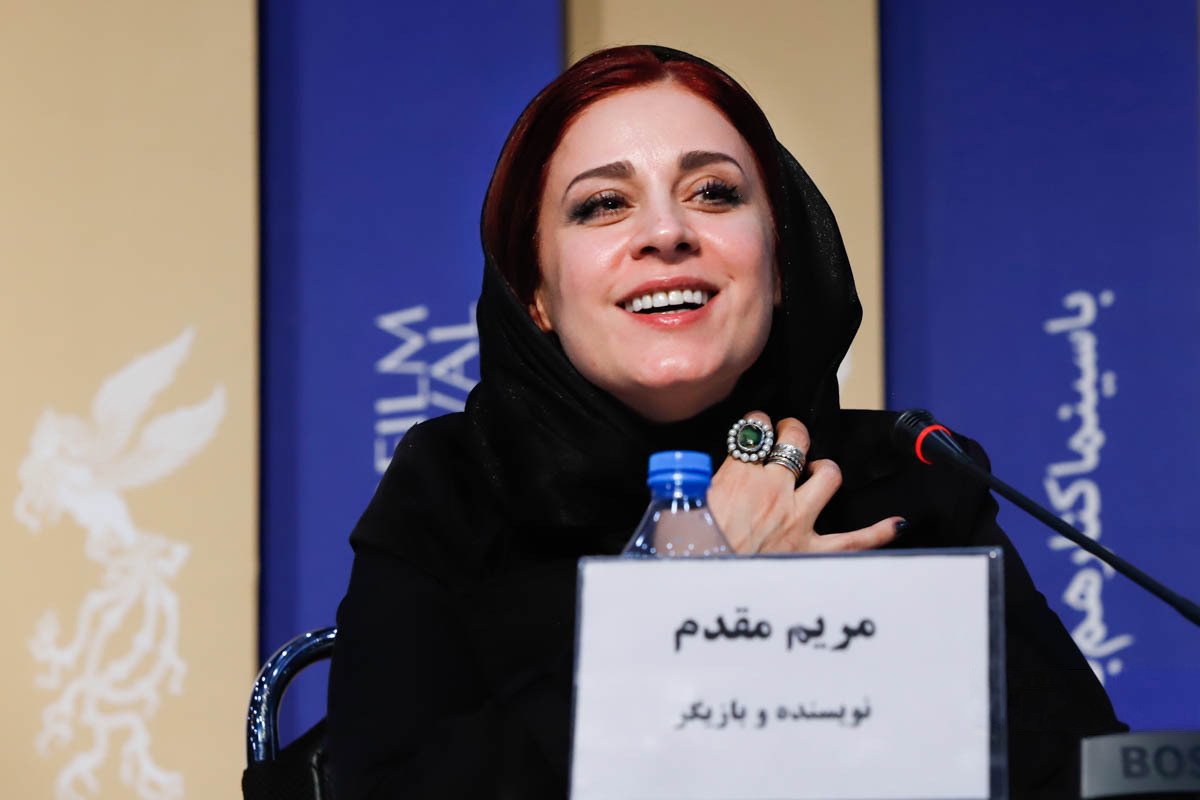
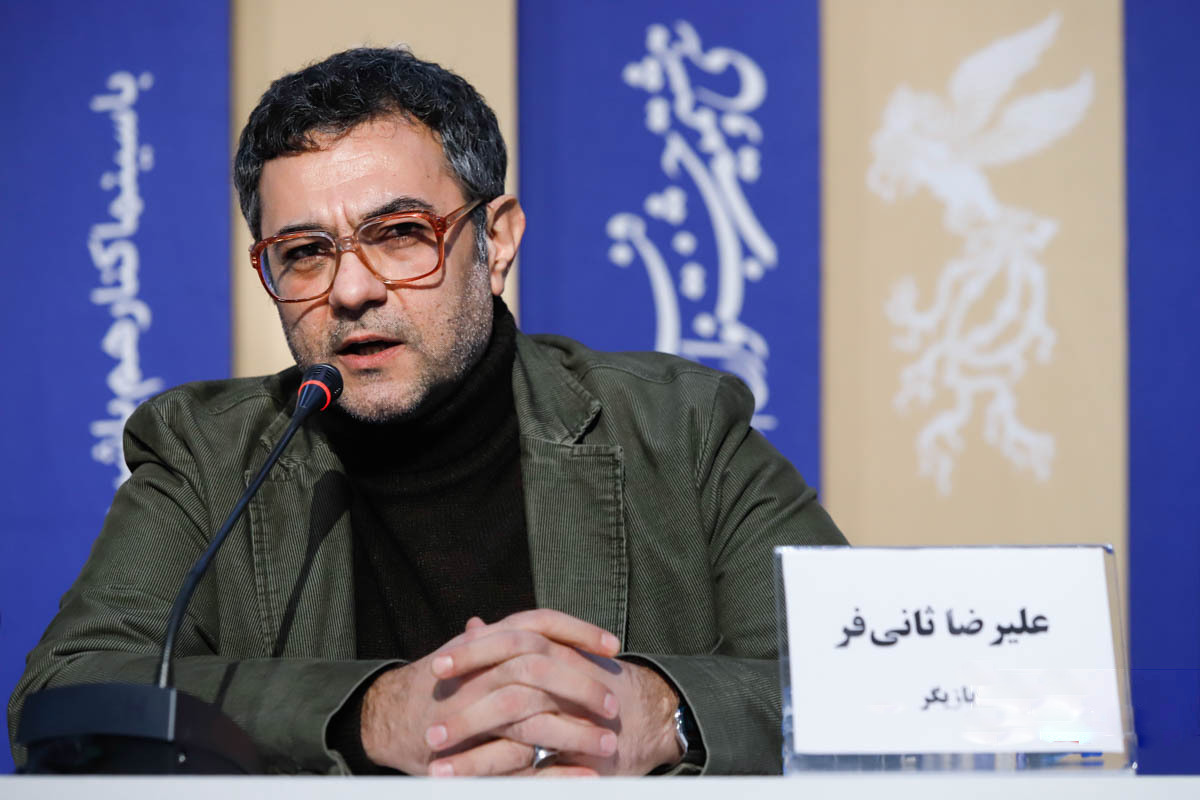
Maryam Moqadam and Alireza Sanifar at the movie press conference in 38th Fajr Film Festival.
- Maryam Moqadam as Mina
- Alireza Sanifar as Reza
- Pouria Rahimi as Babak's brother
- Farid Ghobadi as Reza's Colleague
- Lily Farhadpour as Mina's Neighbor
- Avin Poor Raoufi as Bita (Mina's daughter)

== Production ==
Ballad of a White Cow drama film co-directed by Behtash Sanaeeha and Maryam Moqadam, and co-written by Sanaeeha, Moqadam, and Mehrdad Kouroshniya.

== Release ==
The film had its worldwide premiere at the 38th Fajr Film Festival.

On February 11, 2021, Berlinale announced that the film would have its worldwide premiere at the 71st Berlin International Film Festival in the Berlinale Competition section, in March 2021.

The film was released as Le pardon in France (Forgiveness).

== Reception ==
=== Awards and nominations ===
Year	Award	Category	Nominated	Result
2020	Fajr Film Festival	Best Screenplay	Behtash Sanaeeha, Maryam Moqadam, Mehrdad Kouroshniya	Nominated
2020	Fajr Film Festival	Best Actress in a Leading Role	Maryam Moqadam	Nominated
2021	Berlin International Film Festival	Competition Audience Award	Behtash Sanaeeha	Nominated
2021	Berlin International Film Festival	Golden Berlin Bear	Behtash Sanaeeha	Nominated
2021	Fünf Seen Film Festival	Audience Award	Behtash Sanaeeha	Nominated
2021	Jerusalem Film Festival	Award for International Cinema	Behtash Sanaeeha	Nominated
2021	Der Neue Heimatfilm	Best Film	Behtash Sanaeeha	Won
2021	Zurich Film Festival	Golden Eye	Behtash Sanaeeha	Nominated
2021	Zurich Film Festival	Special Mention	Behtash Sanaeeha	Won
2021	Hong Kong Asian Film Festival	New Talent Award	Behtash Sanaeeha	Nominated
2022	Iran's Film Critics and Writers Association	Best Screenplay	Behtash Sanaeeha, Maryam Moqadam, Mehrdad Kouroshniya	Nominated
2022	Iran's Film Critics and Writers Association	Best Actress in a Leading Role	Maryam Moqadam	Nominated
