= Tenement (2024 film) =

2024 film by Inrasothythep Neth and Sokyou Chea

- Theatrical release poster
- Directed by: Inrasothythep Neth; Sokyou Chea
- Written by: Inrasothythep Neth; Sokyou Chea
- Produced by: Loy Te
- Starring: Thron Thanet; Socheata Sveng; Yoshihiko Hosoda
- Cinematography: Jeremiah Overman
- Edited by: Jimmy Henderson; Loy Te
- Music by: Jean-Charles Bastion
- Production companies: Kongchak Pictures; Spanic Films; Westec Media Limited
- Distributed by: Westec Media Limited
- Release dates: 30 January 2024 (Rotterdam); 14 November 2024 (Cambodia)
- Running time: 88 minutes
- Country: Cambodia
- Languages: Khmer; Japanese; English

Tenement (Khmer: អ្នកស្នងអគារ, romanized: anak snang akear) is a 2024 Cambodian folk horror film written and directed by Inrasothythep Neth and Sokyou Chea in their directorial debuts. The film also symbolizes Cambodia’s turbulent past by sympathizing with the Khmer people. The film had its world premiere in the Big Screen Competition section at the 2024 International Film Festival Rotterdam. The film was also premiered at the Osaka Asian Film Festival in March 2024. The film had its theatrical release in Cambodian theatres on 14 November 2024.

It was selected as the Cambodian entry for the Best International Feature Film at the 98th Academy Awards, but was not on the list of films accepted by the academy.

== Synopsis ==
Soriya (Thorn Thanet), a Cambodian Khmer manga artist decides to travels to her motherland Cambodia with her boyfriend to explore about the secrets of down memory lane memories of her mother. Soriya moves into her mother’s old apartment after her mother's death, but in an interesting turn of events, the apartment building is being shrouded in mystery due to some bizarre events which occur in the building. Soriya experiences over-friendly gestures from the neighbours soon after moving to the apartment, which makes Soriya curious about the neighbors behavior, as she suspects that there could be supernatural elements existing within the apartment building.

== Cast ==
- Thorn Thanet as Soriya
- Socheata Sveng as Aunt Mao
- Yoshihiko Hosoda as Daichi

== Production ==
The shooting of the film project was commenced in 2020, but it was halted midway for two years due to the impact of the COVID-19 pandemic and the shooting predominantly took place in Tokyo and in Cambodia. The filmmakers also delayed the screening of the film, but they found ample time in between to focus on the post-production work of the film. The filmmakers revealed that the idea about attempting such a film genre with cultural depiction was inspired after exploring an old building at Phsar Tapang.

The film was set against the backdrop of Cambodia and Japan, while it was also a cross-cultural joint film collaboration between Cambodia and Japan. It became the first Cambodian feature film to incorporate the use of Dolby Atmos sound mixing technology as a part of sound innovative tactics. The filmmakers made use of Dolby Atmos sound mixing to give a glimpse and feeling of heightened tensions and atmosphere throughout the film to elevate the emotional impact.

== Accolades ==
The film was subsequently selected to compete for the VPRO Big Screen Award at the 53rd International Film Festival Rotterdam. The film was conferred with the Best Production Design Award at the 2024 Ho Chi Minh Film Festival.

== See also ==
- List of submissions to the 98th Academy Awards for Best International Feature Film
- List of Cambodian submissions for the Academy Award for Best International Feature Film
