= Tenement Museum =

Tenement Museum may refer to:

- Lower East Side Tenement Museum, a museum in Manhattan, New York City.
- 14 Henrietta Street, a museum in Dublin, Ireland.
