= Behtash Sanaeeha =

Iranian film director

- بهتاش صناعی‌ها
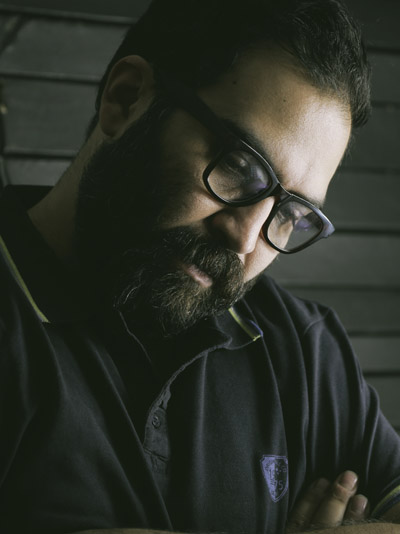
- Iranian film director
- Born: 1980 (age 45–46); Shiraz, Iran
- Occupations: Film director; producer; screenwriter
- Years active: 1998–present
- Spouse: Maryam Moqadam

Behtash Sanaeeha (Persian: بهتاش صناعی‌ها) is an Iranian film director, producer, and screenwriter. He is known for the 2020 feature film Ballad of a White Cow, which he co-wrote and co-directed.

== Early life and education ==
Behtash Sanaeeha was born in Shiraz, a city located in the Fars province of Iran.

He graduated in civil engineering BA, and began a Master of Arts programme in architecture but left before finishing the degree.

== Career ==
Sanaeeha started writing scripts and directing short films, documentaries and advertisements. He also wrote and directed two animated TV series and a TV fiction film.

His first feature film, Risk of Acid Rain, won the Best Screenplay at the 31st Fajr Film Festival, and also got nominated for the best film in the Arts and Experience section in the same festival. Risk Of Acid Rain also won the first prize of "Brilliant Talents" section from the 9th celebration of film critics. Sanaeeha also won the 2015 Netpac (Asian Cinema Promotion) award from the Iranian Film Festival in Australia. The film was screened at more than thirty festivals globally.

After his first feature, Sanaeeha co-directed a documentary film named The Invincible Diplomacy of Mr Naderi in 2017 with Maryam Moqadam which won numerous awards at domestic and international film festivals.

In 2018, Sanaeeha was selected to be a jury member for Ingmar Bergman Award in Sweden.

Sanaeeha's best-known work is the 2021 feature film Ballad of a White Cow, which he co-wrote and co-directed. It premiered in the competition section of the 71st Berlin International Film Festival and later won the audience award. The film was also screened at multiple international festivals including Tribeca, Karlovy Vary, Zurich, Melbourne, and Edinburgh Film Festivals.

My Favourite Cake, also co-written and co-directed with Maryam Moqadam, had its world premiere on 16 February 2024 at the 74th Berlin International Film Festival.

== Filmography ==
Year	Title	Credited as
2014	Risk of Acid Rain	Director & Writer
2017	The Invincible Diplomacy of Mr Naderi	Director & Producer
2017	Kitchen Dreams	Producer
2017	Termite	Actor
2020	Ballad of a White Cow	Director & Writer
2024	My Favorite Cake	Director & Writer, World premiere at 74th Berlin International Film Festival in February

== Awards and festivals ==
- WINNER of the best screenplay in 33rd Fajr Film Festival - IRAN 2015 (Risk Of Acid Rain)
- Nominated for the best film (Simorgh Boloorin) in 33rd Fajr Film Festival - IRAN 2015 (Risk Of Acid Rain)
- WINNER of the best talented first film director in the 9th celebration of film critics - IRAN 2015 (Risk Of Acid Rain)
- WINNER of the NETPAC award - AUSTRALIA 2015 (Risk Of Acid Rain)
- WINNER of the special jury award International Film Festival Colombo - SRI LANKA 2015 (Risk Of Acid Rain)
- WINNER of Audience award Prague Film Festival - CZECH Republic 2016 (Risk Of Acid Rain)
- Official Selection 26th Stockholm Film Festival - SWEDEN 2015 (Risk Of Acid Rain)
- Official Selection Mumbai Film Festival - INDIA 2015
- Official Selection 14th Pune Film Festival - INDIA 2015 (Risk Of Acid Rain)
- Official Selection Zurich Film Festival - SWITZERLAND 2015 (Risk Of Acid Rain)
- Official Selection 39th Gothenburg Film Festival - SWEDEN 2016 (Risk Of Acid Rain)
- Official Selection 19th Perth Film Festival - AUSTRALIA 2016 (Risk Of Acid Rain)
- WINNER of the best documentary film award in Iran documentary Film Festival (Cinema Verite) 2017.(The Invincible Diplomacy Of Mr. Naderi)
- WINNER of the best documentary film award in Prague Film Festival 2018 (The Invincible Diplomacy Of Mr. Naderi)
- Nominated for Best Screenplay at the 38th Fajr Film Festival for the film Ballad for the White Cow 2020
- Nominated for the Golden Bear 71st Berlin International Film Festival in competition - GERMANY 2021 (Ballad of a White Cow)
- WINNER of Audience Award 71st Berlin International Film Festival ın competition - GERMANY 2021 (Ballad of a White Cow)
- Official Selection Tribeca Film Festival - USA 2021 (Ballad of a White Cow)
- Official Selection 56th Karlovy Vary International film festival - Czechia 2021 (Ballad of a White Cow)
- WINNER of best narrative feature the Der Neue Heimatfilm Festival - 2021 AUSTRIA (Ballad of a White Cow)
- Official Selection 17th Zurich Film festival - 2021 SWITZERLAND (Ballad of a White Cow)
