= Maryam Moghaddam =

Iranian actress, screenwriter and director (born c.1970)

- مریم مقدم
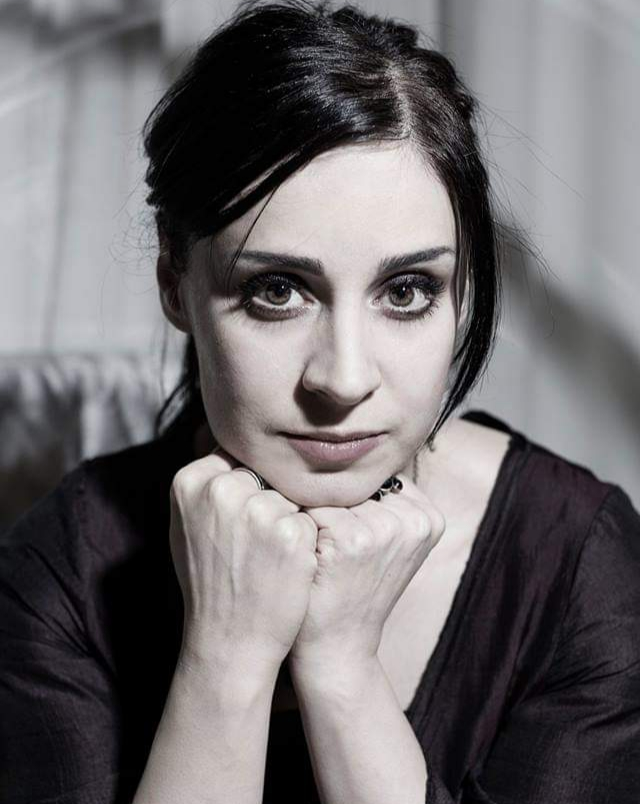
- Moghaddam in 2019
- Born: 1969 or 1970; Tehran, Iran
- Occupations: Actress; screenwriter; director
- Years active: 1993–present
- Spouse: Behtash Sanaeeha

Maryam Moghaddam (Persian: مریم مقدم; born 1969 or 1970), also spelt Moghadam and Moqadam, is an Iranian actress, screenwriter, and director, known for her collaborations with her husband Behtash Sanaeeha. She is best known for her acting in Closed Curtain (2013) and Risk of Acid Rain (2015) (which she also co-wrote), and co-writing and directing Ballad of a White Cow (2020). The couple's most recent collaboration is My Favourite Cake, which had its world premiere on 16 February 2024 at the 74th Berlin International Film Festival.

== Early years and education ==
Maryam Moghaddam (also transliterated as Moghadam and Moqadam) was born in 1969 or 1970 in Tehran, Iran.

She graduated from the Performing Arts School in Gothenburg, Sweden.

== Career ==
Moghaddam performed on the stage many times in Sweden, including at the National Theatre in Gothenburg.

In 1993, she had her first role in a feature film in Zero Height (Bolandiha-ye Sefr), directed by Hossein-Ali Layalestani. She also starred in The Legend of Love (2000) directed by Farhad Mehranfar, and Closed Curtain (Pardé; 2013).

Moghaddam co-wrote Risk of Acid Rain (2015) with her husband Behtash Sanaeeha, and she acted in the film.

She starred in the 2017 film Termite(s) (Mouriyaneh), directed by Masoud Hatami, which also starred Behtash Sanaeeha. It won two awards at the 2019 Figura Film Festival in Portugal.

Her debut directing effort with her husband was The Invincible Diplomacy of Mr. Naderi, released in 2018. She then co-wrote and co-directed Ballad of a White Cow (released 2020) with Sanaeeha.

Also with Shaeeha, she co-wrote and co-directed My Favourite Cake, which had its world premiere on 16 February 2024 at the 74th Berlin International Film Festival.

== Accolades ==
Moghaddam has received many accolades, including a Crystal Simorgh, and a nomination for an Iran's Film Critics and Writers Association Award.

Other awards and nominations include:

- 2015: Co-winner (with Behtash Sanaeeha), Best Screenplay, at the 33rd Fajr Film Festival, for Risk Of Acid Rain
- 2017: Co-winner (with Behtash Sanaeeha), Best Documentary Film, Cinéma Vérité documentary film festival in Tehran, for The Invincible Diplomacy of Mr. Naderi
- 2017: Co-winner (with Behtash Sanaeeha), Best Documentary Film, Hafez Awards, for The Invincible Diplomacy of Mr. Naderi
- 2018: Co-winner (with Behtash Sanaeeha), Best Documentary Film at the Festival of Iranian Films in Prague, for The Invincible Diplomacy of Mr. Naderi
- 2019: Nominated, Best Actress in a Leading Role, in 38th edition of the Fajr Film Festival, for her role in Ballad of a White Cow
- 2019: Nominated, Best Script, in the 38th edition of the Fajr Film Festival, for Ballad of a White Cow
- 2024: FIPRESCI Award at the Berlin International Film Festival, for My Favourite Cake
- 2024: Ecumenical Jury Award at the Berlinale, for My Favourite Cake

== Filmography ==
=== Film ===
Year	Title	Role	Director	Notes
1993	Zero Height (Bolandiha-ye Sefr)	Mahtab	Hossein Ali Layalestani	
1997	Cinema Is Cinema	Mandana	Ziaeddin Dorri	
2000	Legend of Love	Khazar	Farhad Mehranfar	
2003	Silence Between Two Thoughts		Babak Payami	
2006	The Confrontation	Mahtab	Saeed Ebrahimifar	
2013	Closed Curtain	Melika	Jafar Panahi, Kambuzia Partovi	
2015	Risk of Acid Rain	Mahsa	Behtash Sanaeeha	also as screenwriter, executive producer
2017	Leaf of Life	Nasim	Ebrahim Mokhtari	
2017	Termite(s)		Hasoud Matami	
2018	The Invincible Diplomacy of Mr. Naderi		Behtash Sanaeeha, Maryam Moghaddam	Documentary film, also as screenwriter
2020	Ballad of a White Cow	Mina	Behtash Sanaeeha, Maryam Moghaddam	also as screenwriter
2024	My Favorite Cake		Behtash Sanaeeha, Maryam Moghaddam	World premiere at 74th Berlin International Film Festival in February

=== Television ===
- Fallet, 2009 (SVT series; directed by Caroline Cowan)
- Chalsio, 2011 (TV movie, directed by Behtash Sanaeeha)
