= University of Art =

Art University in Tehran, Iran

Coordinates: 35°42′12″N 51°24′23″E

Iran University of Art
- دانشگاه هنر ایران
- Former name: Tehran University of Art
- Type: Public
- Established: 1918; 108 years ago
- President: Behshid Hosseini
- Location: Tehran and Karaj, Iran
- Campus: Urban
- Nickname: University of Art
- Website: https://art.ac.ir/en

Iran University of Art (Persian: دانشگاه هنر ایران, Daneshgah-e Honar-e Iran; former "Tehran University of Art and formally Art Academic Complex (1979–1991)), is the largest art university in Iran, consisting of seven faculties and an international campus in Tehran and the nearby city of Karaj. It is composed of five former separate academic institutions: the Conservatory of Music (founded 1918), the College of National Music (founded 1949), the College of Decorative Arts (founded 1960), the College of Dramatic Arts (founded 1964), and Farabi University (founded 1975).

== Curricula ==
In 2023, the Iranian government barred the university from admission of cinema, music, sculpture major curriculum students.

== Faculties ==
=== Faculty of Applied Arts ===
The Ministry of Art and Culture established the Faculty of Decorative Arts in 1960, originally offering programs in printing, painting, pottery, fabrics, and interior architecture. When University of Art was consolidated and established in 1991, the faculty gained its current name. Current offerings include industrial design and clothing design.

=== Faculty of Architecture and Urban Planning ===
Originally founded in 1999 as the department of urbanism, the faculty was expanded in 2000 and is located in both Tehran and Karaj. In addition to BA and MA programs, the Faculty offers two PhD programs in urbanism and architecture.

=== Faculty of Cinema and Theater ===
In 1957, the Department of Fine Arts established the Dramatic Arts Office, which was renamed to the Faculty of Dramatic Arts in 1960. Since Iranian universities re-opened in 1983, the school has operated as the Faculty of Cinema and Theater, currently offering BA and MA programs in eight areas: cinema, acting, puppetry, scenery design, acting and directing, dramatic literature, animation, and theater directing. PhD program for "Theater studies" was also added to faculty.

=== Faculty of Conservation and Restoration ===
This school offers MA and PhD programs in museum studies, Islamic arts, and historical reconstruction and renovation. Dr. Samad Samanian is the dean of the faculty.

=== Faculty of Music ===
Now located in Karaj, the Faculty of Music was spun off from the Faculty of Applied Arts and moved out of Tehran in 1994. That original program was formed from the Conservatory of Music and the College of National Music in 1989. The school offers programs in military, Iranian, and classical music performance, as well as composition and ethnomusicology.

=== Faculty of Theories and Art Studies ===
The Faculty of Theories and Art Studies offers MA and PhD programs in art studies, art philosophy, and Islamic art history.

=== Faculty of Visual Arts ===
The Faculty of Visual Arts was founded in 1978, taking over some majors then offered by the Faculty of Decorative Arts and Farabi University, and it expanded in 1983 to include programs in photography and painting.

=== Farabi International Campus ===
Farabi International Campus offers 24 MA and PhD programs.
