= List of Singaporean films of 2015 =

This is a list of films produced in Singapore ordered by release in 2015.

| Date | Title | Director | Producer | Production Cost | Singapore Gross | Ref. |
|---|---|---|---|---|---|---|
| 2 January 2015 | Spelling Armadillo | Glenn Chan | Media Development Authority/Channel 5/Oak3 Films | | | |
| 8 January 2015 | Bring Back the Dead | Lee Thean-jeen | Weiyu Films | $1.1 million | $376,973 | |
| 9 January 2015 | 2 Boys And A Mermaid | Lee Thean-jeen | Weiyu Films/Channel 5 | | | |
| 15 January 2015 | Faeryville | Tzang Merwyn Tong | David Foo, Juliana Matter, Ko Mori, Tzang Merwyn Tong | | | |
| 19 February 2015 | King of Mahjong | Adrian Teh | Allyan Too, Lim Teck | | $820,000 | |
| 19 February 2015 | Ah Boys to Men 3: Frogmen | Jack Neo | J Team, mm2 Entertainment | $2.85 million | $7.62 million | |
| 13 March 2015 | Cats And Dogs: Chronicles Of A Pest Detective | Kabir Bhatia | Media Development Authority/Verite Productions/Channel 5 | | | |
| 20 March 2015 | The Playground: Gone Kimmy Gone | K. Rajagopal | Media Development Authority/Verite Productions/Channel 5 | | | |
| 27 March 2015 | October: The Dreamboat | Wee Li Lin | Media Development Authority/Verite Productions/Channel 5 | | | |
| 24 April 2015 | Fundamentally Happy | Tan Bee Thiam, Lei Yuan Bin | 13 Little Pictures | | | |
| 1 May | Snakeskin | Daniel Hui | Noraishah Abu Bakar, Hey Mun Cheok, Vicki Yang, Ishvinder Singh, Lim Lung Chieh | | | |
| 3 May | Wukan: The Flame of Democracy | Lynn Lee, James Leong | | | | |
| 24 May 2015 | Old Friends (老朋友) | Debe Hoo, Boi Kwong, Alvin Lee, Royston Tan | Singapore Memory Project, Chuan Pictures | | | |
| 15 July 2015 | Our Sister Mambo | Wi Ding Ho | Meileen Choo, Lee Soon Gee, Suat Yen Lim | | $221,302 | |
| 24 July 2015 | 7 Letters | Boo Junfeng, Eric Khoo, K Rajagopal, Jack Neo, Tan Pin Pin, Royston Tan, Kelvin Tong | Melvin Ang, Ric Aw, Fran Borgia, Kent Chan, Leon Cheo, Jeremy Chua, Tan Fong Cheng, Kat Goh, Huang Junxiang, Jacqueline Khoo, Karen Khoo, Sock Leng Ling, Jack Neo, Yue Weng Pok, Royston Tan, Leon Tong, Soo Wei Toong | $3.1 million | $331,882 | |
| 30 July 2015 | 1965 | Randy Ang, Daniel Yun | Daniel Yun, Ng Say Yong | $2.8 million | $613,841 | |
| 15 August 2015 | Second Chances | Glenn Chan | Ananya Pictures/Okto | | | |
| 3 September 2015 | 1400 | Derrick Lui | Vogue Films | | | |
| 10 September 2015 | The Return | Green Zeng | June Chua | | | |
| 15 September 2015 | In the Room | Eric Khoo | Nansun Shi | $800,000 | $52,423 | |
| 17 September 2015 | 3688 | Royston Tan | Melvin Ang, Royston Tan, Bert Tan, Zheng Le, Ng Say Yong, Karen Khoo, Soo Wei Toong | $1.4 million | $461,316 | |
| 2 October 2015 | Heartland | K. Rajagopal | Verite Productions | | | |
| 24 October 2015 | Kapatiran (Brotherhood) | Pepe Diokno | Epicmedia/QCinema International Film Festival/Potocol | | | |
| 30 October 2015 | Fragment | Kan Lume, Wesley Leon Aroozoo, Sherman Ong, U-Wei Haji Saari, Tan Chui Mui, Lucky Kuswandi, Phan Dang Di, Kavich Neang, Nawapol Thamrongrattanarit and Lav Diaz | Asian Film Archive | | | |
| November 2015 | 5 to 9 | Vincent Du, Tay Bee Pin, Daisuke Miyazaki, Rasiguet Sookkarn | Wormwood Films/Deep End Pictures Inc./CAM+ life Film Production/Off Scene Films/White Light Post | | | |
| 5 November 2015 | Distance | Xin Yukun, Tan Shijie and Sivaroj Kongsakul | Giraffe Pictures | | $57,215 | |
| 14 November 2015 | 1987: Untracing the Conspiracy | Jason Soo | | | | |
| 27 November 2015 | Voluptas | Sanif Olek | Sanif Olek | | | |
| 29 November 2015 | The Songs We Sang | Eva Tang | Irene Films | $35,000 | $133,879 | |
| 30 November 2015 | Singapore Minstrel | Ng Xi Jie | Small Moon Projections | | | |
| 1 December 2015 | The Return | Green Zeng | Chen Tianxiang, Vincent Tee, Tan Beng Chiak | | | |
| 2 December 2015 | The Naked DJ | Kan Lume | Chris Ho | | | |
| 3 December 2015 | Mr. Unbelievable | Ong Kuo Sin | Ong Kuo Sin, Ng Say Yong | $1 million | $560,000 | |
