= List of Singaporean films of 2005 =

This is a list of films produced in Singapore ordered by release in 2005.

Date	Title	Director	Producer	Production Cost	Singapore Gross	Ref.
January 2005	A Wicked Tale	Tzang Merwyn Tong	INRI studio	NA	NA	
20 January 2005	Rice Rhapsody	Kenneth Bi	Ground Glass Images / Kenbiroli Films	US$1,000,000	$15,000	
8 February 2005	I Do, I Do	Jack Neo	J Team Productions / Raintree Pictures	$800,000	$1,849,000	
April 2005	Singapore GaGa	Tan Pin Pin	Point Pictures	$100,000	NA	
12 May 2005	Be with Me	Eric Khoo	Zhao Wei Films	$200,000	$175,000	
18 August 2005	The Maid	Kelvin Tong	Raintree Pictures / Dream Movie Entertainment	$1,500,000	$2,154,000	
7 October 2005	Cages	Graham Streeter	Aquafire Productions, Imperative Pictures	$1,000,000	$11,200	
30 October 2005	House of Harmony	Marco Serafini	FFP Media, ZDF Pictures, Oak 3 Films			
2 September 2005	One More Chance	Jack Neo	J Team Productions	$1,100,000	$1,200,000	
17 December 2005	4:30	Royston Tan	Zhao Wei Films, NHK, supported by Singapore Film Commission	$400,000	$24,061	
