= Faeryville =

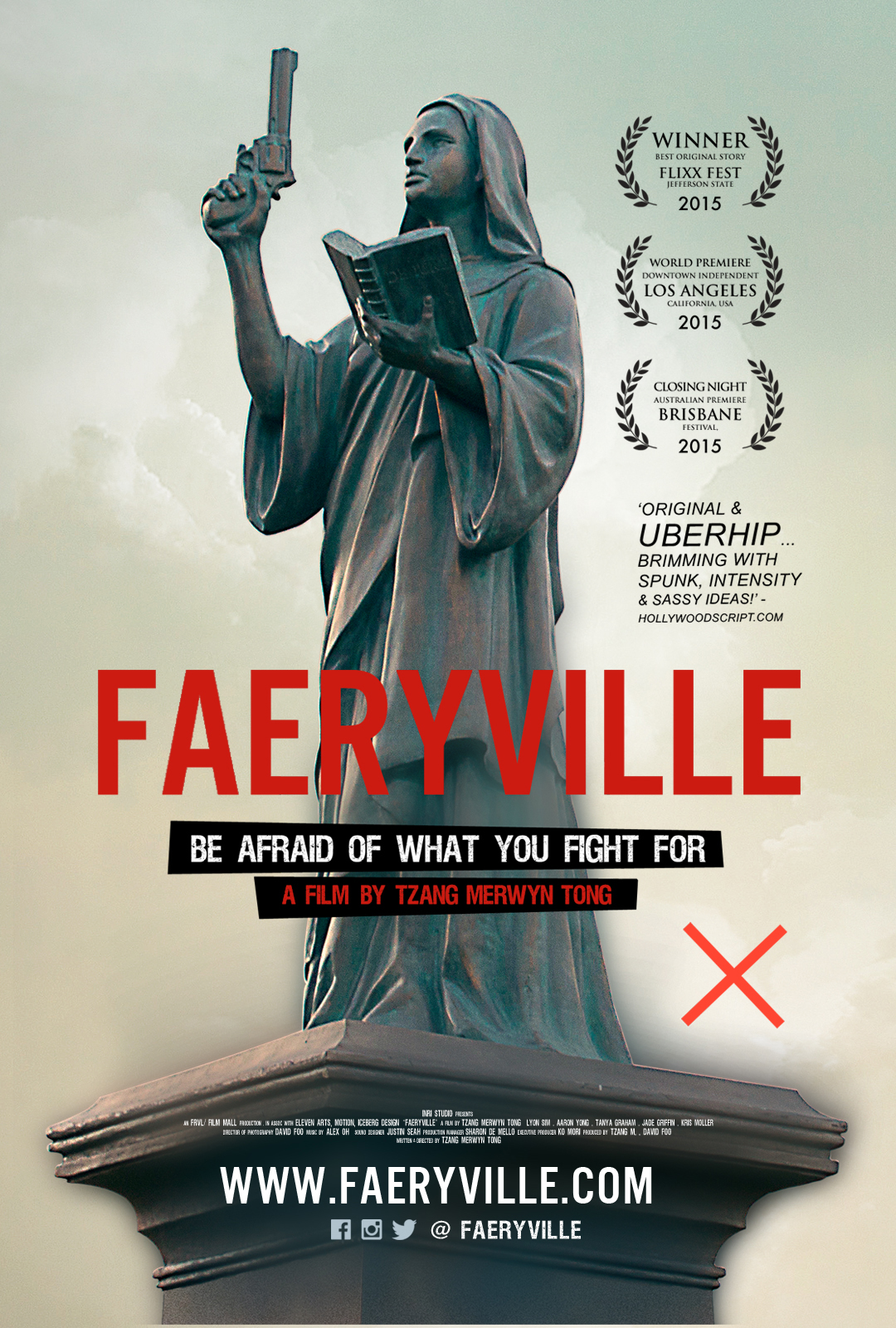
- Directed by: Tzang Merwyn Tong
- Written by: Tzang Merwyn Tong
- Produced by: Tzang Merwyn Tong; David Foo
- Starring: Lyon Sim; Aaron Samuel Yong; Tanya Graham; Farid Assalam; Jae Leung
- Cinematography: David Foo
- Music by: Alex Oh; In Each Hand A Cutlass
- Production companies: INRI studio; Film Mall; Eleven Arts
- Distributed by: INRI studio
- Release date: 19 January 2015
- Running time: 95 minutes
- Countries: Singapore; United States
- Language: English

Faeryville is a 2015 Singaporean coming-of-age dystopian film written and directed by cult director Tzang Merwyn Tong. This independent film stars Lyon Sim, Aaron Samuel Yong, Tanya Graham and Kris Moller. Faeryville tells the story of a group of college misfits who decide to fight their bullies, escalating from youthful idealism to all-out anarchy. Faeryville is Singapore's first dystopian youth film.

The film made its world premiere to rousing reception in Los Angeles, California, represented by US distributor Eleven Arts, followed by a limited theatrical release in Singapore. It was the Closing Night Film of the Brisbane Festival 2015 and won the Award for Best Original Story at the FLIXX Festival, in Scott Valley, United States.

== Plot ==
Set in an alternate universe, in a college called Faeryville, a group of teenage misfits struggle to find themselves and make sense of their ‘teenhood’. They decide that there is no reason to try to fit in, and fashion themselves as pranksters, calling themselves The Nobodies. Laer, a new transfer student who joins The Nobodies, inspires them to move from stink bombs to homemade bombs. Youthful idealism soon becomes an excuse for all-out anarchy.

== Cast ==
- Lyon Sim as Poe
- Aaron Samuel Yong as Laer
- Tanya Graham as Belle
- Jae Leung as CK
- Farid Assalam as Taurus
- Jade Griffin as Chloe
- Kris Moller as The Principal
- Jordan Prainito as Anthony
- Roshan Gidwani as AJ

== Production ==
Faeryville is a co-production between INRI studio and Film Mall. In August 2012, it was revealed that Tzang Merwyn Tong had finished principal photography for a secret film project that was in development since 2008. The film was code-named The FRVL Project, and was pitched as a controversial Fight Club meets Baz Luhrmann's Romeo & Juliet rebellion film. The film is written by Tzang in 2006 and is said to be inspired by youth of the post-9-11 generation.

The film ran out of money to complete production twice, and was shot over 2 production timelines, due to bad weather that almost bankrupted the indie project. The film took 8 years, 14 script rewrites to complete.

== Release and reception ==
The film made its world premiere to stunning acclaim and reception in Los Angeles on January 14, 2015, represented by US-based distribution company Eleven Arts. Faeryville then opened on May 26, 2015 at Filmgarde Bugis+ with a limited theatrical run in Singapore.

Power of Pop hailed the film as "brave and remarkable" calling it "a fairytale of nightmarish consequences." Screen Anarchy, a website featuring news and reviews of mainly international, independent and cult films called Faeryville "A new cinematic universe... bleak, exciting, surprising.”

Faeryville became the first Singapore film to compete at FLIXX Festival in Scott Valley. The film won the Best Original Story Award. Faeryville was also screened as part of the Singapore: Unbound - A Singapore Cinema Showcase at the Griffith Film School.

== Soundtrack ==
Faeryville: Original Motion Picture Score consists of original, mostly orchestral music, with some electronic and guitar elements, written for the film by Alex Oh. Faeryville also features music by Singapore indie rock groups, including The Great Spy Experiment, post-rock band In Each Hand a Cutlass, Bob Kamal and ANECHOIS.

== See also ==
- List of Singaporean films of 2015
