= Ho Tzu Nyen =

Singaporean contemporary artist and filmmaker

Ho Tzu Nyen (何子彥)
- Ho in 2024
- Born: 1976 (age 49–50); Singapore
- Education: BFA (Victorian College of the Arts, University of Melbourne, 2001); MA (National University of Singapore, 2007)
- Known for: Film, video art, installation art, performance art, virtual reality
- Movement: Contemporary art
- Awards: 2026: Grand Prize. The Fukuoka Prize, Japan; 2025: Established Artist medalist at the Art Basel Awards, Switzerland; 2024: CHANEL Next Prize; 2014-15: Residency at DAAD Artists-in-Berlin Program, Germany

Ho Tzu Nyen (Chinese: 何子彥; pinyin: Hé Zǐyàn; born 1976) is a Singaporean contemporary artist and filmmaker whose works involve film, video, performance, and immersive multimedia installations. His work brings together fact and myth to mobilise different understandings of Southeast Asia's history, politics, and religion, often premised upon a complex set of references from art history, to theatre, cinema, and philosophy.

Placed 5th on the ArtReview's 2025 Power 100 list, Ho is widely considered one of the most influential artistic voices in Asia today. Ho's mid-career survey, Time & the Tiger, opened at the Singapore Art Museum in November 2023 and has since traveled to the Art Sonje Center in Seoul, the Hessel Museum of Art in Annandale-on-Hudson, New York, Mudam Museum of Modern Art in Luxembourg, and Hamburger Kunsthalle in Germany. In 2011, Ho represented Singapore at the 54th Venice Biennale at the Singapore Pavilion, presenting the work The Cloud of Unknowing. Ho has also participated in several international film festivals, such as the 41st Directors' Fortnight at the Cannes Film Festival in France (2009) and the Sundance Film Festival in Park City, Utah (2012).

In 2025, Ho was named Artistic Director of the 16th Gwangju Biennale, which opens in September 2026.

== Education and personal life ==
Ho was born in Singapore in 1976. From 1998 to 2001, Ho studied art at the School of Creative Arts, Victorian College of the Arts, University of Melbourne, Australia, obtaining his Bachelor of Creative Arts (Dean's List). Later from 2003 to 2007, Ho studied at the Southeast Asian Studies Programme at the National University of Singapore, obtaining a Master of Arts (by Research). Ho currently lives and works in Singapore.

== Career ==
=== Early projects ===
In 2003, at his solo exhibition at The Substation, Singapore, Ho presented Utama—Every Name in History is I. The titular work involved a video installation and twenty portrait paintings that re-examined the 14th-century figure of Sang Nila Utama as the pre-colonial founder of Singapore, in relation to the histories of other regional founders. Ho would present the project as a lecture in a number of pre-tertiary and tertiary educational institutions in Singapore, which included discussions of the process of making the work, as well as the larger historical contexts in which the origin myths are embedded. After repeated deliveries, the lecture's scope further expanded, along with the formalisation of its mode of presentation as a scripted performance, and Ho would be invited to present the lecture performance at a number of theatrical events and performing arts festivals, first abroad, then in Singapore.

Interested in establishing a history of contemporary art for Singapore, Ho produced 4x4—Episodes of Singapore Art, a series of four documentaries that was aired on national television in 2005. Each episode focused on a work of art produced by a Singaporean artist, featuring Cheong Soo Pieng, Cheo Chai-Hiang, Tang Da Wu, and Lim Tzay Chuen. In 2006, Ho completed Sejarah Singapura, a commission for the National Museum of Singapore that features an immersive, panoramic audiovisual representation of precolonial Singapore. During the inaugural Singapore Biennale in 2006, Ho was commissioned to create The Bohemian Rhapsody Project, a work composed of audition footage that was shot within the former Supreme Court of Singapore, the site where the biennale was being held.

=== Continued performances and films ===
Ho produced The King Lear Project (2007–08), a four-part theatrical series that staged critical essays about King Lear, rather than Shakespeare's original version of the play. In 2009, Ho completed the feature film, HERE. Stylistically moving between a documentary format and fictional scenes, the film is set in a mental institution, featuring a protagonist undergoing an experimental “videocure” treatment, a plot inspired by the writings of French theorist Félix Guattari. With HERE, Ho would participate in numerous international film festivals in 2009, including the 41st Directors' Fortnight at the 62nd Cannes Film Festival in France, the 14th Busan International Film Festival in South Korea, the 26th Warsaw Film Festival in Poland, and the 16th Oldenburg International Film Festival in Germany, among others.

In 2009, Ho would create another film and performance, EARTH, which would be screened as part of the official selection at the 66th Venice International Film Festival, Italy. The 42-minute film utilises three continuous long takes, featuring 50 filmed actors constantly shifting between conscious and unconscious states, achieved by having the actors deeply absorbed in a complex system of cues during filming. The projected film would be accompanied by live musicians performing a continuous track in sync to the images, a technically complex task for the musicians.

=== 54th Venice Biennale ===
In 2011, Ho represented Singapore at the 54th Venice Biennale at the Singapore Pavilion, presenting the video installation The Cloud of Unknowing, curated by June Yap. Involving a set of eight vignettes that each centred on a character that stands for the cloud's representation in historically significant Western and Eastern artworks, the video work was projected within a darkened Hall of the Saints Filippo and Giacomo in the Museum Diocesano di Venezia, on a "floating screen that had a sculptural presence". The work would circulate as a film in festivals such as the 64th Locarno Festival, Switzerland in 2011, the Sundance Film Festival, Utah, USA in 2012, and the 42nd Rotterdam International Film Festival, the Netherlands. It would also be staged as a solo show at the Guggenheim Museum Bilbao, Spain in 2015, and later at the Crow Museum of Asian Art, Texas, USA in 2017.

=== The Critical Dictionary of Southeast Asia ===
Since 2012, Ho has developed The Critical Dictionary of Southeast Asia, an overarching conceptual and research framework asking what constitutes Southeast Asia when the region has historically shared no single language, religion or political system. Organised around evolving alphabetic entries, it has generated works across film, theatre, installation, virtual reality, writing and digital media.

A recurring motif is the tiger, approached as an animal, mythological figure and historical metaphor. Ho first developed it through Song of the Brokenhearted Tiger (2012), a theatrical and musical performance presented at the Esplanade in Singapore. In 2014, Ho produced a sequel, Ten Thousand Tigers, which would further lead to several video installations, lectures, and texts that further developed his examination of the Malayan tiger and their various manifestations. Such would include 2 or 3 Tigers (2015), presented at the Haus der Kulturen der Welt, Berlin, Germany, and its later, expanded version, One or Several Tigers (2017), which incorporates aspects and props of the theatre piece. 2 or 3 Tigers was exhibited at SUNSHOWER: Contemporary Art from Southeast Asia 1980s to Now Exhibition (2017), the largest exhibition of contemporary Southeast Asian art in Japan to date.

In 2017 at the Asia Art Archive, Hong Kong, Ho launched the formal manifestation of The Critical Dictionary of Southeast Asia (CDOSEA), five years after the project's inception in 2012. An interactive online platform and algorithmically composed “infinite film”, it plays with the idea of a continuous stream of audiovisual material that is constantly updated by multiple and unknown authors. CDOSEA serves as the overarching framework for Ho's recent projects, including Ten Thousand Tigers (2014), 2 or 3 Tigers (2016), and One or Several Tigers (2017) which find their place in the dictionary under "T", as well as The Name (2015) and The Nameless (2015), which are listed under "G" for "Gene Z. Hanrahan" and "Ghost". Other CDOSEA projects include R for Resonance (2019), a virtual reality work examining the gong in Southeast Asia, an instrument connecting societies and individuals through ritual music, embodying a sacred cosmology.

Other works arising from the dictionary include The Name (2015–17), associated with “G for Ghost(writers).” It centres on Gene Z. Hanrahan, the ambiguous author and editor of books with divergent ideological positions, including a history of the Malayan Communist Party. The uncertainty surrounding Hanrahan’s identity becomes a means of examining authorship and historical authority.

=== Investigating The Kyoto School ===
Ho's most recent research project is centred around a historical examination of The Kyoto School (Kyōto-gakuha), a group of 20th century Japanese scholars who developed original philosophies by based on the intellectual and spiritual traditions of East Asia. Ho co-hosted a seminar on The Kyoto School with KADIST and frequent collaborator Hyunjin Kim at the 2018 Gwanju Biennale. The first work from this project, Hotel Aporia (2020), presented at the Aichi Triennale in 2020, was later curated by Hyunjin Kim in the group show Frequencies of Tradition (2020–21) at the Guangdong Times Museum.

=== Ho Tzu Nyen: Time & the Tiger ===
In November 2023, the Singapore Art Museum (SAM) opened a solo mid-career exhibition titled "Ho Tzu Nyen: Time & the Tiger" featuring eight major installations and a new commission by SAM and Art Sonje Center (ASJC) titled "T for Time". The title piece centers on the dispersion of tigers across Asia over time due to climate change of both glacial shifts and rising sea levels that have impacted tigers roaming freely to the point of near extinction presently. The exhibition is scheduled to travel to several worldwide venues after its premiere at SAM at Tanjong Pagar Distripark from November 24, 2023, to March 3, 2024.

== Art ==
Ho's work is often premised upon a dense set of interwoven references. Curator June Yap notes that allusion to history is common in Ho's practice—whether in painting and popular music for The Bohemian Rhapsody Project (2006), text for The King Lear Project (2007–08), philosophy in Zarathustra: A Film for Everyone and No One (2009), and historical material itself in Utama—Every Name in History is I (2003). Ho describes his films, videos, installations, and performances as tending towards theatre, particularly in relation to the notion of theatre as that which happens when one is in the presence of another. His recent projects under The Critical Dictionary of Southeast Asia examine the complex entity of Southeast Asia, a region that has not historically been unified by language, religion, or political power.

=== Utama—Every Name in History is I (2003) ===
The video installation Utama—Every Name in History is I (2003), consists of a video and twenty portrait paintings. The work depicts the 14th-century figure of Sang Nila Utama, a discoverer of Singapore, with the video weaving together apocryphal relationships with various historical regional leaders examine the legitimacy founding narratives, both assembling and dispelling myth. Time is collapsed through the deployment of the same actor to play other explorers such as Christopher Columbus, Vasco da Gama, Zheng He, and Singapore's British coloniser, Sir Thomas Stamford Raffles. The work is currently exhibited at the National Gallery Singapore.

=== 4x4—Episodes of Singapore Art (2005) ===
In 2005, upon being commissioned by the Singapore Art Show to produce a new work, Ho purchased four half-hour prime-time slots of airtime on the Arts Central channel from national broadcaster, Mediacorp. Working with a production company that made commercials, Ho produced 4x4—Episodes of Singapore Art, a four-episode TV documentary series. Each episode examined an artwork by a Singaporean artist. The first of these works was a painting, Tropical Life (1959), by Cheong Soo Pieng; the second was a piece of conceptual artwork, 5 x 5 (Singapore River) (1972), by Cheo Chai Hiang; then a performance art intervention Don’t Give Money to the Arts (1995), by Tang Da Wu; and finally, Lim Tzay Chuen's unrealised project, Alter #11 (2002).

=== The King Lear Project (2007–08) ===
Ho produced The King Lear Project (2007–08), a four-part theatrical series that staged critical essays about King Lear, rather than Shakespeare's original version of the play. Early in 2007, alongside collaborator Fran Borgia, Ho co-directed the first part of the project, Lear - The Avoidance of Love, named after Stanley Cavell's essay. The project was simultaneously a live audition, film shoot, lecture, and theatre performance; framed as a film but enacted as a play. The next part, Lear - Lear Enters, is based on an essay of the same name by Marvin Rosenberg, followed by Lear - Dover Cliff and the Conditions of Representation, based on an essay by Jonathan Goldberg. Finally, Lear - The Lear Universe is based on an essay by the Shakespearean scholar, G. Wilson Knight. The King Lear Project was staged at the Singapore Arts Festival, Singapore and Kunstenfestivaldesarts, Brussels, Belgium, in 2008.

=== Hotel Aporia (2015) ===
At the fourth edition of the Aichi Triennale in 2019, Ho presented Hotel Aporia, a seminal multi-channel installation that spans four interconnected “rooms” in Kiraku-tei, a former Ryokan operating during the late Meiji period. Grounded in the building’s archival documents and Ho’s email exchanges with Yoko Nose, the Triennal’s curator, Hotel Aporia interrogates the ideological shadows of interwar Japan. The piece combines Ho’s research interests in The Kyoto School’s intellectual debates, Yasujiro Ozu and Ryuichi Yokohama’s films (and subsequent time in Southeast Asia), as well as stories about the Kamikaze unit’s ceremonial dinner at the artwork’s installation site. Epistolary in form, Hotel Aporia features scripted voiceover dialogue between Ho and five interlocutors: Yoko Nose (curator, Aichi Triennale 2019), Kazue Suzuki (the project’s assistant translator), Tomoyuki Arai (dramaturg and Ho’s frequent collaborator), and two marginal wartime figures, Sakae Miyauchi (a member of the kamikaze Kusanagi Unit) and Yukiko Nagasaka (a landlady of the Kiraku-Tei).

=== Night Charades (2025) ===
Night Charades is the first of Ho’s works to experiment with AI-generated imagery. Similar to Ho’s recent body of work over the past decade, the piece utilizes an algorithmic editing system to create non-linear combinations of characters and scenes, most of which reference Hong Kong’s cinematic history. Co-commissioned by M+ and Art Basel and presented by UBS, the piece debuted on the M+ Museum’s facade at the beginning of Art Basel Hong Kong in 2025 and remained there every night for three months.

=== P for Power (2026) ===
P for Power, a single-channel video installation which premiered at BOZAR Brussels in February 2026, is Ho’s latest iteration of CDOSEA. The piece contains 30 algorithmically-edited chapters that explore how “power” proliferates in Southeast Asia. The piece was initially inspired by Dutch philosopher Baruch Spinoza who speaks of power “not as a domination, but as the capacity to affect and be affected.”

== Awards and residencies ==
Ho was named Singapore's first Grand Prize recipient at the Fukuoka Prize ceremony in 2026.

In 2015, Ho was awarded the Grand Prize of the Asia Pacific Breweries Foundation Signature Art Prize, Singapore, for the work PYTHAGORAS (2013).

In 2013, Ho was an artist-in-residence at the Asia Art Archive, Hong Kong. From 2014 to 2015, Ho was artist-in-residence at the DAAD, Berlin, Germany, and in 2019, Ho was an artist-in-residence at the NTU Centre for Contemporary Art Singapore.

== Notable works in public collections ==
- Reflections (2007), Mori Art Museum, Tokyo
- NEWTON (2009), Mori Art Museum, Tokyo
- The Cloud of Unknowing (2011), Mori Art Museum, Tokyo
- The Cloud of Unknowing (2011), Singapore Art Museum
- The Cloud of Unknowing (2011), Solomon R. Guggenheim Museum, New York
- The Nameless (2015), M+ Museum, Hong Kong
- The Name (2015-2017) and The Nameless (2015), Singapore Art Museum
- 2 or 3 Tigers (2015), Tate Modern, London
- One or Several Tigers (2017), Singapore Art Museum
- The Critical Dictionary of Southeast Asia (2017 - ongoing), Singapore Art Museum
- The Critical Dictionary of Southeast Asia (2017 - ongoing), Metropolitan Museum of Art, New York
- The Mysterious Lai Teck (2018), Red Brick Museum, Beijing
- Hotel Aporia (2019), Singapore Art Museum
- The 49th Hexagram (2020), Gwangju Biennale Foundation
- Phantoms of Endless Day (2025), LUMA Arles
