= First Class (TV series) =

- Created by: Wu Min Xiu; Lee Chew Yen
- Directed by: Lee Chew Yen; Deakarajen V Sanmugan; Sherkhan; Ian Seymour; Wu Min Xiu
- Starring: Max Loong; Jade Seah; Nicholas Lee; Mark Zee; Sivakumar Palakrishnan; Sebastian Tan; Patrick Teoh; Julian Low; Rahimah Rahim; Scott Hillyard; Zenn Long; Muhammad Hasif Bin Muhammed; Shanice Nathan; Charlene Ong; Sharon Ismail
- Country of origin: Singapore
- No. of seasons: 2
- No. of episodes: 24

Production
- Running time: 23 minutes

Original release
- Network: MediaCorp TV Channel 5
- Release: August 9, 2008 – December 27, 2009

First Class is 2008 Singaporean comedy television series produced by local TV station MediaCorp.

The comedy series is set in Singapore and focuses on the secondary school education system.

The interactive website was a Nominee for 2009 International Digital Emmy (Children & Young People).

== Synopsis ==
The story follows a new teacher at Achiever Secondary School who arrives after graduating from the . Entering the profession with idealistic expectations about teaching and student life, he later encounters challenges in managing students and working alongside colleagues whose approaches differ from his expectations..

The narrative follows a group of Secondary 1 students who develop a friendship through their shared school activities and classes. The story focuses on their personal development and interpersonal relationships within the academic environment.

== Cast ==
Staffroom
| Cast Name | Character | Profession | Bio |
|---|---|---|---|
| Sebastian Tan | Mr Ashley Loong | Home Economics | Flamboyant Home Economics teacher who's the “mother hen”. Loves his job, but faces the overwhelming pressure of teaching Home Econs to the entire school, as well as overseeing 28 CCAs. |
| Patrick Teoh | Mr Gay Beh Song | Science | Cranky old Science teacher who's been around forever. He just wants to retire in peace. The only one that can get away with talking back to Chow. |
| Nicholas Lee | Mr Jay Chow | Vice-Principal | The Vice-Principal of Achiever Secondary School is small-minded, petty and power-hungry. His ambition and competitiveness is only exceeded by his mediocrity. |
| Rahimah Rahim | Lynda Harapan | Music, Art | Ms. Mardy's sister, who comes in as a temporary teacher when Ms. Mardy goes off on an expedition to Antarctica, but remains in the school when Mardy decides to stay there for good. |
| Max Loong | Michael Wong | English | Idealistic, optimistic, has a never-say-die spirit. Shows real care and concern for his students. But his idealism gets him fired at the end of last season, and thereafter he sinks into a hermetic depression – from which he may never recover. |
| Mark Zee | Mr Noel Lee | Physical Education | Himbo PE teacher who's vain and proud of his body, but is not the brightest bulb in the box. Even has his own fan club, the No-Belles. His greatest skill is, ironically, in cooking – a fact which he tries to deny, but which he must confront when Achiever suddenly needs a Home Economics teacher. |
| Sivakumar Palakrishnan | Mr Raju S/O Rajasattam | Math | An old-fashioned traditional Discipline Master with a strong moral code. Strict, but can be a softie at heart. |
| Jade Seah | Ms Tew Li Li | History, Geography | Tough, cranky, bitter and cynical, she's the ultimate wet blanket. Idolizes Adam Chen, to the extent of stalking him at MediaCorp. Crushes easily on younger men… like Michael. |
| Timothy Nga | Sia Chung An | Principal | A new Principal who comes in when Mrs. Chin leaves, Sia is warm, kind and friendly, establishing great rapport with staff and students alike. However, beneath his amiable façade, he is a corporate shark at heart. He secretly schemes to get rid of all of Achiever's teachers and replace them with his own Elite Team. |
| Serene Chen (voice) | Mrs Daisy Chin | Principal (Former) | The Principal, who's so busy with Ministry Meetings and such that she hardly ever shows up in school. In fact, most students graduate without ever knowing what she looks like. Communicates with the teachers remotely via speakerphone. |

Classroom
| Cast Name | Character | a.k.a. | Bio |
|---|---|---|---|
| Shanice Nathan | Catherine Katherine De Souza("Cathy") | The princess | The pretty princess who comes from an obscenely rich family, she's sweet and extremely naïve. An idiot savant with PhD level math abilities. She's picked to go to an elite school, and has to choose between a bright future as Singapore 's Chosen, or to stay with her friends. |
| Scott Hilyard | Daniel Ang | The Genius | The boy genius whose only weaknesses are his arrogance and his immense ego. A smart aleck who loves putting others down. |
| Muhd Hasif Bin Muhd Nasir | Helmi Bin Adam | The Class Clown | The class clown who's quick-witted and always coming up with pranks and schemes. Latchkey kid who was raised by his maids. |
| Zenn Long | Koh Choon Yang ("CY") | Mr Nice Guy | Likeable mummy's boy who struggles to get out from under his mother's shadow, yet constantly references her. |
| Charlene Ong | Nikita Lim ("Nic") | The Tomboy | Tomboy who's highly skilled in martial arts. Puts loyalty and justice above all; her dream is to be a police officer like her parents. |
| Edwin Goh | Tyler Deng Lee Jun | The Bully (unofficial) | The new Bully in school, Tyler transferred in from Pan-Island Secondary School . After he arrived, the resident bully, Billy Yew, was driven out due to fear. He's tougher and meaner, and more willing to use his fists than Billy. He's also Chairman of an underground CCA – Fighting Club, where, as the name suggests, boys meet to fight. |
| Evalee Lin | Felicia | The Head Prefect | A nerdy head prefect in school who bootlicks the principal. She has a crush on the principal, Sia Chung An. |

== Episodes ==
=== Season 1 (2008) ===
| No. overall | No. in series | Title | Directed by | Written by | Original release date |
|---|---|---|---|---|---|
| 1 | 1 | "Party of Five" | Deakarajen V Sanmugan | Wu Min Xiu & Marcus Goh | August 9, 2008 |
Mr. Michael Wong (Max Loong), Achiever Secondary School's newest teacher, is at his first day of school, and already he meets the dowdy Miss Tew Li Li (Jade Seah), and Mr. Jay Chow(Nicholas Lee), Vice-Principal of Secondary School. Meanwhile, five displaced Secondary 1 kids, CY (Zenn Long), Nic (Charlene Ong), Helmi (Muhammad Hasif Bin Muhammed), Cathy (Shanice Nathan), and Daniel (Scott Hillyard) find themselves encountering the various teachers of Achiever Secondary School - Mr. Noel Lee (Mark Zee), Mr. Ashley Loong (Sebastian Tan), Ms Mardy Harapan (Sharon Ismail), Mr. Gay Beh Song (Patrick Teoh), and Mr. Raju s/o Raja (Sivakumar Palakrishnan).
| 2 | 2 | "If the Glove Fits" | Lee Chew Yen | Wu Min Xiu & Marcus Goh | August 19, 2008 |
It's the annual CCA fair, and all of them are fighting for new secondary one members. But the Party of Five just want to join CCAs for the CCA points. Will they succumb to the tempting materialism of CCA points? Or will they join Michael’s two-member Drama Club?
| 3 | 3 | "Noel Lee: A Tragedy in 5 Parts" | Lee Chew Yen | Wu Min Xiu & Marcus Goh and Dennis Chong | August 26, 2008 |
Noel and the Track & Field team are forced to work with their rival team from Pan Island Secondary School, who reveal his surprising past. Meanwhile, will Cathy choose to be with the Party of Five or her new friends, the No-Belles?
| 4 | 4 | "Citizen Gay" | Ian Seymour | Wu Min Xiu & Marcus Goh | September 2, 2008 |
Michael falls for Lindsey (Joey Feng), the new clerk, while volunteering at an old folks' home with Mr. Gay, Li Li and the kids. But can Helmi deal with the consequences when his tricks go overboard, and can Mr. Gay face the rather mundane truth about his past?
| 5 | 5 | "The Immaculate Deception" | Ian Seymour | Wu Min Xiu & Marcus Goh | September 9, 2008 |
Ashley trains CY to be his cooking protégé, not knowing that CY is actually passing off someone else's culinary creations as his own. Meanwhile, Michael suspects there's 'something' about Lindsey - but will it jeopardize their budding relationship?
| 6 | 6 | "The Green-Eyed Monster" | Lee Chew Yen | Wu Min Xiu & Marcus Goh and Dennis Chong | September 16, 2008 |
Daniel's family secret distances him from the Party of Five. Meanwhile, Mr. Chow pushes Ms. Mardy's Go Green campaign to unreasonable extremes. Can Michael & the Party of Five (well, four now) help them both before it is too late?
| 7 | 7 | "Who Framed Raju Raja" | Wu Min Xiu | Wu Min Xiu & Marcus Goh and Dennis Chong | September 23, 2008 |
Raju and the teachers discover YouTube videos depicting them ill-treating students, and Nic must learn to control her temper when Billy, the school bully, provokes her. Will Raju's name be cleared, and can Nic stop herself from falling for Billy's taunts?
| 8 | 8 | "Creativity Killed the Cat" | Ian Seymour | Wu Min Xiu & Marcus Goh | September 30, 2008 |
Full-day enrichment lessons replace classroom lessons when Mr. Chow revamps the school's teaching methods and curriculum. With the kids too tired to do homework or study properly, can Michael save the students before they all collapse from exhaustion?
| 9 | 9 | "More Equal than Others" | Deakarajen V Sanmugan | Wu Min Xiu & Marcus Goh | October 7, 2008 |
Michael meets the new trainee teacher Candy (Ericia Lee), and Mr. Chow decides to be nice for the first time in his life. When his niceness leads to a schoolwide crisis, the teachers join forces to return him to his normal evil self - but will it be enough?
| 10 | 10 | "Michael Gets Fired (Really!)" | Deakarajen V Sanmugan | Wu Min Xiu & Marcus Goh | October 14, 2008 |
Mr. Chow takes over Michael's play, "Animal Barn", while Li Li gets increasingly jealous of Candy's relationship with Michael. Will Candy and Michael be together? Will Li Li finally get her heart's desire? Will Mr. Chow ruin the play? Will Michael get fired? Will there be more questions?

=== Season 2 (2009) ===
| No. overall | No. in series | Title | Directed by | Written by | Original release date |
|---|---|---|---|---|---|
| 11 | 1 | "Rebels Without a Cause" | Deakarajen V Sanmugan | Wu Min Xiu & Marcus Goh | September 29, 2009 |
Three months after Michael’s dismissal, a dismal, melancholy Achiever faces its worst problem students – the Party of Five? Will Mr. Chow and the teachers be able to convince Michael to return, or and will they be able to stop the Party of Five from terrorising students, relief teachers, and Mr. Chow’s car? Also introduces Julian Low as the new Mr. Noel Lee.
| 12 | 2 | "Much Ado About Erica" | Deakarajen V Sanmugan | Wu Min Xiu & Marcus Goh | October 6, 2009 |
Lynda Harapan (Rahimah Rahim), estranged sister of Mardy Harapan, joins Achiever as their best (and only) Music teacher. But will this former singer-cum-diva be able to adjust to the structured life of a teacher? Who (or what) is Erica, and why can’t Helmi live without her?
| 13 | 3 | "The Blind Baba" | Lee Chew Yen | Wu Min Xiu & Marcus Goh and Sherkhan | October 13, 2009 |
Achiever is gripped by The Blind Baba fever – CY’s favourite TV show. But when the school’s obsession reaches psychotic heights, it’s up to Li Li to bring everybody back to their senses. Meanwhile, Michael’s dark secret comes to light…
| 14 | 4 | "Enter the Dragon" | Lee Chew Yen | Wu Min Xiu & Marcus Goh | October 20, 2009 |
An over-worked Ashley attends a counselling course taught by Kay (Tracy Tan), under the persuasion of Sia Chung An Timothy Nga, Achiever’s newest principal – who is also Nic’s latest crush. Will there be explosions? Will there be a mental breakdown? Will the school ever be the same again?
| 15 | 5 | "Fighting Club" | Sherkhan | Wu Min Xiu & Marcus Goh | October 27, 2009 |
Mr. Chow is demoted to teaching P.E., while Noel takes over as the Home Economics teacher – just as Yvonne (Eelyn Kok), his first love, joins Achiever as vice-principal. Meanwhile, Daniel confronts Achiever’s most notorious bully, Tyler (Edwin Goh). Will Noel win back Yvonne’s heart? Will Daniel’s brain win out Tyler’s brawn?
| 16 | 6 | "The Credit Crunch" | Sherkhan | Wu Min Xiu & Marcus Goh and Sherkhan | November 3, 2009 |
Mr. Raju's daughter, Divya (Rekha Amara), joins Achiever as a relief teacher. It's a dream come true – but for Divya or Mr. Raju? Meanwhile, the Party of Five discover the joys of Cathy's credit card. When Tyler woos Cathy and tells her the Party of Five are just gold-diggers, who will Cathy believe?
| 17 | 7 | "Injustice for All" | Deakarajen V Sanmugan | Wu Min Xiu & Marcus Goh | November 10, 2009 |
The Party of Five meet Shanti (Dhurrgah D/O Mathivanan), a psycho-analysing exchange student. But Achiever's most nefarious students have other plans for her – they've joined forces to form the Injustice Gang! And with the help they just might succeed. Meanwhile, Mr. Chow discovers Sia's treachery during a paintball session – but will the teachers believe him?
| 18 | 8 | "Beauty and the Beast" | Deakarajen V Sanmugan | Wu Min Xiu | November 17, 2009 |
Li Li finally has her chance at love when Sia sets her up on a blind date that is too good to be true. CY falls for Shanti, but peer pressure forces him to choose between her or the Party of Five. Will Li Li & CY find true love, or is this yet another one of those tedious romantic diversion episodes?
| 19 | 9 | "Exit the Dragon" | Lee Chew Yen | Wu Min Xiu & Marcus Goh | November 24, 2009 |
Sia finally executes his evil plan to take over Achiever, and not even the combined might of the teachers will be able to stop him. A lonely Helmi forms a fatherly bond with Mr. Chow – but will this connection be strong enough to overcome Sia's dastardly ambitions?
| 20 | 10 | "Sleeping With the Enemy" | Wu Min Xiu | Wu Min Xiu & Marcus Goh | December 1, 2009 |
Michael moves in with a certain muscle-bound PE teacher – who might not be the perfect room mate he thinks he is. Something's “bugging” Nic, but her mother is too busy with Crimewatch auditions to take care of her Will Michael feel right at home with Noel? And what will happen when Nic loses a fight to Tyler… and DIES?
| 21 | 11 | "The Numbers Game" | Lee Chew Yen | Lillian Wang | December 8, 2009 |
Mr. Gay’s position is jeopardised when Mrs. Poon returns to Achiever after 12 long years of maternity leave, and Daniel’s shameful addiction is in danger of being discovered when he falls asleep everywhere. Will Mr. Gay have the retirement he’s always (not) wanted, and will the Party of Five discover Daniel’s dirty little secret?
| 22 | 12 | "Rocking the Vote" | Wu Min Xiu | Lillian Wang | December 15, 2009 |
The Prefectorial Elections are here – with Nic and Tyler running neck-to-neck to be prefect! Meanwhile, the unromantic Mr. Raju must win back his wife when she kicks him out for being unromantic. Will Nic become prefect, or will Tyler’s intimidation win him the votes? And can Michael & Li Li help Mr. Raju find his inner Casanova?
| 23 | 13 | "I Not Stupid" | Wu Min Xiu | Wu Min Xiu & Marcus Goh | December 22, 2009 |
When Brighton, Mr. Gay’s son, visits Achiever, the teachers have to continue Mr. Gay’s charade and pretend he is the principal. Meanwhile, Chow enrolls Daniel in a competition and turns him dumb by overworking him. Will Mr. Gay’s lie be exposed, and will Daniel ever speak grammatically again?
| 24 | 14 | "Candid Camera" | Wu Min Xiu | Wu Min Xiu | December 27, 2009 |
As Achiever faces the threat of being absorbed by arch-rivals Pan Island, Cathy transfers to a new school – for geniuses! Will Michael and the Party of Five find a way to keep Achiever unscathed? And even if they do, will Cathy come back to Achiever? And what's Mr. Chow doing in the Bahamas, anyway?
