= Jade Seah =

Singaporean actor-model

- Born: 6 April 1983 (age 43); Singapore
- Occupations: Actress, host, model, Radio DJ at 987FM
- Years active: 2006–present
- Spouse: Terence Lim

Chinese name
- Traditional Chinese: 謝美玉
- Simplified Chinese: 谢美玉
Transcriptions
Standard Mandarin
- Hanyu Pinyin: Xiè Měiyù

Jade Seah (Chinese: 谢美玉; pinyin: Xiè Měiyù, born on 6 April 1983) is a Singaporean model, host and actress, of mixed Chinese Peranakan and Eurasian parentage.Former Mediacorp artiste.

== Career ==
Seah was a model before going into acting. She was 1st runner-up at the Miss Singapore Universe 2006 pageant and signed a contract with MediaCorp soon after the pageant. She is now the new face of Nivea Visage. She was a host in the Singaporean reality television show, The Dance Floor, with co-hosts Glenn Ong and Mark Van Cuylenberg. She had reported in Today in Beijing on Channel 5, on the day's highlights of the 2008 Summer Olympics in Beijing.

=== 2008 Olympics Controversy ===
While hosting the 2008 Summer Olympics' program Today in Beijing on Channel 5, Seah was reportedly heard uttering a profanity live on air after wrongly pronouncing the name of a Chinese athlete. The scene shifted from the studio to a recorded clip of a basketball match when the vulgarity was heard. The scene was recorded and uploaded to YouTube. It had led to plenty of discussions on online forums, blogs and also on Facebook. However, her artiste manager denied that Seah had uttered any profanity and MediaCorp confirmed this.

However, the next day, Mr Kenneth Liang, executive vice-president (TV Programming & Production, Channel 5), MediaCorp TV confirmed that Seah had uttered the profanity unintentionally. The microphone was not switched off after her lines were delivered which led to her reaction over the fluff being captured on the program. Seah would not be replaced as the co-host of Today in Beijing. In a statement from Channel 5, Seah apologised for the incident and explained her over-reaction.

== Recognition ==
In 2025, Seah was recognized by the Global South World as one of the Top 50 most influential journalists on TikTok in Southeast Asia.

== Personal life ==
Seah graduated from Tanjong Katong Girls' School, Tampines Junior College and Singapore Management University on the Dean's list with an honours degree in Communications and Marketing. She has both Chinese and Eurasian parentage. She is the only daughter in her family, with two brothers.

On 31 January 2015, Seah married banker Terence Lim at Our Lady of Lourdes Church.

== Filmography ==
- Beach.Ball.Babes 2008
- First Class 2008
- New Beginnings 2010
- C.L.I.F. 2011
- Point of Entry (TV series) (season 2) 2011

== Variety shows ==
- Rated:E, as a roving reporter
- The Dance Floor, as a host
- Sweets for my Sweet 2007
- Sports@SG (2009), (2010)

== See also ==
- The Dance Floor
- Miss Singapore Universe 2006
- Miss Singapore Universe 2006 finals
