= Lim Tzay Chuen =

Singaporean contemporary artist (born 1972)

Lim Tzay Chuen (林载春)
- Born: 1972 (age 53–54); Singapore
- Education: BFA (Royal Melbourne Institute of Technology, 1997)
- Known for: Conceptual art
- Movement: Contemporary art

Lim Tzay Chuen (Chinese: 林载春; pinyin: Lín Zàichūn; born 1972) is a Singaporean contemporary artist known for his conceptual works that involve designing or constructing subtle interventions within systems, leading viewers to re-evaluate their perceptions and assumptions of social, economic, cultural and political processes.

Lim has exhibited both in Singapore and internationally, participating in exhibitions such as the Gwangju Biennale (2002) and the Biennale of Sydney (2004). In 2005, Lim represented Singapore at the 51st Venice Biennale with MIKE.

== Education and personal life ==
Lim was born in Singapore in 1972. He studied briefly at the then-LASALLE Art College and the Nanyang Academy of Fine Arts in Singapore, before embarking on a 3-year degree programme at the Royal Melbourne Institute of Technology University, Australia. Graduating in 1997, Lim continued to participate in numerous exhibitions locally and internationally. Lim is married to Chinese artist, Cao Fei.

== Career ==
For the Gwangju Biennale 2002, Lim conceptualised the project Alter #10, which involved the addition of a "fictitious" floor to the exhibition space of the biennale by doctoring exhibition maps in published materials, as well as renaming floors and altering elevator buttons. This was done without obvious announcements, and emerged only six months later in an article by Singaporean art critic Lee Weng Choy in Art AsiaPacific number 37.

In 2002, for the work Alter #11, Lim proposed that a single rifle shot be fired into an art gallery on the campus of Singapore's National Institute of Education, executed by a trained sniper located at the military firing range located one kilometre away from the campus. The project was eventually unrealised, with the bureaucratic, legal, and ethical concerns preventing the work from being carried out. Alter #11 would be the subject of one of the four episodes of the TV documentary series, 4x4—Episodes of Singapore Art (2005) by Singaporean artist, Ho Tzu Nyen.

In 2003, the Singapore performance company, TheatreWorks, presented the LIM TZAY CHUEN project conceived and directed by Ong Keng Sen. A graduation project of the pioneer class of the Theatre Training & Research Programme (TTRP), it was the final culmination of work by the nine graduating students from the TTRP Class of 2001, which involved the active participation of Ong, Lim, and Lok Meng Chue. An immersion into the works of Lim, five exercises were introduced based on Lim's works, transferring them into physical and theatrical frames.

At the 2004 Biennale of Sydney, Lim designed and coordinated A Proposition That You May Want to Consider, a project addressed to the public. The proposition delineated that "enterprising" individuals who collected certain pages from the 2004 Biennale of Sydney catalogues would be receive use of the Artspace Gallery 1, AUD$4000, 4 nights hotel accommodation and official inclusion as an invited "artist" to the biennale.

At the art event, Nuit Blanche, Paris, in October 2004, Lim proposed seeding the clouds over the city with a non-toxic quantity of organic Pheromones for the work, Alter #16. With such pheromones reputed to possess aphrodisiac qualities, Lim sought to literally send a rain of love down upon the world capital of romance. The work was unrealised, being dismissed by French authorities despite Lim proposing collaboration and consultation with Meteorologists, health institutions and other related agencies.

In 2005, Lim represented Singapore at the 51st Venice Biennale with MIKE, curated by Eugene Tan. The first solo presentation at the Venice Biennale's Singapore Pavilion, Lim proposed to bring the 80-ton Merlion statue from Singapore to Venice as a tongue-in-cheek comment on tourism, self-representation, and capitalism. The project never materialised due to the lack of approval from relevant parties, pointing towards the bureaucracy of modern society. Surprisingly, the National Arts Council, who had commissioned the work, did not insist on a substitution of artists, instead working with curator and artist to present the unrealised project in Venice. The Singapore Pavilion was converted into a large public toilet, and outside it was a signboard with the words "I wanted to bring MIKE over." The catalogue displayed digitally altered photographs of a missing Merlion in Singapore, as well as a fictitious newspaper article that lauded the successful feat of bringing over the statue to Venice. The work has been interpreted as a work that signalled the height of the shift towards conceptual art in Singapore, which had started in the 1970s.

In 2005, A Work by Lim Tzay Chuen was exhibited at the Earl Lu Gallery of the Institute of Contemporary Arts Singapore. The solo exhibition by Lim featured an almost entirely empty, meditative space, placing an emphasis of the 'white cube' gallery space.

== Art ==
Lim's practice alters the conditions of contexts such as a gallery space, an exhibition, or a catalogue, leading viewers to critically re-evaluate their perceptions and assumptions of social, economic, cultural and political processes. Described as ‘alterations’, ‘gaps’ or ‘delays’, such interventions are typically ‘discovered rather than ‘exhibited’. Lim further describes his work as getting institutions to "entertain the possible", or being concerned with "offering" solutions to possible problems.
