= Umut Kekilli =

German-Turkish footballer

Personal information
- Date of birth: 17 April 1984 (age 42)
- Place of birth: Cologne, Germany
- Height: 1.83 m (6 ft 0 in)
- Position: Midfielder

Youth career
- 1997–2000: Bayer Leverkusen
- 2000–2001: 1. FC Köln
- 2001–2005: SCB Viktoria Köln

Senior career*
Years	Team	Apps	(Gls)
2005–2006	Alemannia Aachen II	13	(1)
2006–2009	Kocaelispor	48	(3)
2009	→ Kartalspor (loan)	11	(0)
2009–2011	Konyaspor	2	(0)
2011	İskenderunspor	5	(0)
2011–2012	Van Büyükşehir Belediyespor	25	(6)
2012–2013	Menemen Belediyespor	10	(2)
2013–2014	Ofspor	19	(2)
2015	Aydınspor 1923	0	(0)
- * Club domestic league appearances and goals

Umut Kekilli (born 17 April 1984) is a German-Turkish former professional footballer.

== Playing career ==
Kekilli began his career with Alemannia Aachen's second team before moving to Turkey to play for Kocaelispor.

== Personal life ==
From 2010 to 2019, Kekilli was in a relationship with German actress Natascha Ochsenknecht, and since 2019 with German former glamour model Jordan Carver, they having a daughter in July 2020.
