= Who Killed Johnny =

- Film poster
- Directed by: Yangzom Brauen
- Screenplay by: Alexa Ihrt
- Story by: Yangzom Brauen; Gerold Wunstel
- Produced by: Yangzom Brauen; Britta Delmas; Patrick Liotard; Shari Yantra Marcacci; Alex Primas; Johann Terretaz, Christophe Vauthey, Gerold Wunstel
- Starring: Melanie Winiger; Max Loong; Carlos Leal
- Cinematography: Jonas Mohr
- Edited by: Barbara Landi
- Music by: Cato
- Production company: independent production
- Distributed by: YangZoom Films (international) and MovieBiz Films (Switzerland)
- Release date: February 13, 2013
- Running time: 80 minutes
- Countries: Switzerland; USA
- Languages: Swiss German, German, English
- Budget: 50,000 CHF

Who Killed Johnny is a Swiss-American screwball comedy film by Yangzom Brauen, filmed and produced in Los Angeles in 2013.

== Plot ==
In the first scene of the film, Melanie is at six in the morning brewing Espresso in her kitchen; a scene that will be repeated several times. Her alleged boyfriend tries quietly to come in the house, there is a dispute because of his infidelity, and Melanie is stabbed by Carlos in the kitchen.

Melanie (Melanie Winiger) lives in Los Angeles and tried with her childhood friend Alex (Max Loong) who also grew up in Zürich in Switzerland, to write the screenplay for a movie in her living room. Both Swiss live in Los Angeles, as actress and actors unknown in their new home, but full of dreams and ambitions in the movie business. They seem to agree only about the planned movie's opening scene in the kitchen, and the male actor Carlos; but not about the further story, whether there should be a comedy, tragedy, a horror movie or thriller. Throughout the day, they muse about the script, fooling around, interrupted by two of their neighbours, Jambo (Ernest Allan Hausmann) and his girlfriend Gudrun (Jordan Carver), who like to enjoy themselves in Melanie's pool in the garden. Alex is watching fascinated the hustle and bustle of the two, in particular of Gudrun in the pool during a work break, developing the screenplay in thoughts, as Melanie in the living room, where she thinks about it, the protagonists of the film to make their quirky friends in Los Angeles, also originating in Switzerland. Both unaware that the brownies from Jambo were not intended for the hosts, as they included hashish and tremendously stimulate, they show fantasies of Alex and Melanie in the movie, who had consumed wine before...

In a later scene, the quartet discovers from the balcony a man lying at the bottom of the street, and seems to the victim of a car accident. Jambo wants to help, Melanie denies to avoid problems with the police, as they are foreigners in the United States; Gudrun and Jambo come from Germany, Jambo is illegal in the United States, and three of them are also colored people, as Melanie sets them apart after Jambo brought the supposedly dead in Melanie's apartment. Now in panic, they think about how 'to rid of the dead'. Before they can implement that idea, they notice that the dead man is undoubtedly Johnny Depp...

The quartet misuse the 'godsend' amateurish, to integrate the supposed star in snippets of their film: love scenes with Gudrun and Melanie, a scene inspired with Melanie in a car inspired by Fear and Loathing in Las Vegas etc. They are interrupted by a self-claimed policeman who inquires on the doorstep to witness a probable hit-and-run and the remains of the victim, Alex' hash dealer, and Hasso and friend which each unannounced bursts in the apartment. Melanie would like to the dead 'get rid of' and Alex knows a cleaner, which takes the supposed corpse out of the house. In a very short scene, the plastic bag used for that suppose moves, and the non-visible cleaner (but being the police officer) "You had to be dead" says and hits with a stick on his victim.

Three months later the first scene of the film is taken finally: Alex (Director), Jambo (sound), Yangzom Brauen and two other friends for camera, script and mask, and Melanie (writer, cover). Gudrun acts as the lead actress and Carlos Leal as Marcel in the male lead role. Because Carlos is concerned about his motivation and especially the unpleasant role as villain, as he claims, the production is delayed more and more, and growing disputes between him as 'professional' and Gudrun as 'amateur', so he shouts, thus the eighth take ends in a disaster – Alex is excited about the setting, but now the movie team now notices that Gudrun actually is stabbed by Marcel in effect.

In the final scene of the film, the fictional Swiss television channel CH1 reports in its newscast, that Carlos Leal, actor and former member of Sens Unik, has been arrested in Los Angeles for manslaughter, as well as Melanie Winiger and Alex Loong are suspected to be enrolled in a pre-trial detention. A possible link is mentioned with a look-alike of Johnny Depp, found death three months ago.

== Cast ==
- Melanie Winiger as Melanie
- Max Loong as Max
- Carlos Leal as Marcel and Carlos
- Ernest Hausmann as Jambo
- Jordan Carver as Gudrun
- Tim Talbot as Simon
- Trevor Coppola as Wulf
- Gerold Wunstel as Hasso
- Yangzom Brauen as bar tender and filmcrew
- Ronnie Rodriguez as Look-alike of Johnny Depp

Rest of cast listed alphabetically:

- Nadine Bosurgi as Miriam
- Florine Elena Deplazes as Penelope
- Martina Harrer as Hairdresser client
- Melina Hess as Make-up girl
- Christopher Karl Johnson as Police officer, Cleaner
- Marcus Maria Jung as Cameraman
- Garo Kuyumcuovic as Businessman
- Barbara Lamelza as Woman at the bar
- Tomm Luna as Assistant hairdresser
- Melissa Macri as Guest 1
- David Lee McInnis as Max 2
- Lexy Stork as Lili (as Lexy Rapsomanikis)
- Jade Thompson as Guest 2
- Roman Wyden as Newscaster

== Production ==
Produced and collaborated on the comedy have Swiss people living in the United States. The independent film was shot during eight days at the home of Yangzom Brauen. A part of the film's budget was collected using crowdfunding. Who Killed Johnny is an independent feature film, shot with an international crew and cast in the house of Yangzom Brauen in the Hollywood hills. Funding was provided by the personal support of the crew and cast, private investors and Kickstarter as fundraising platform. The entire crew has helped even when hanging up movie posters and waived fees.

=== Background ===
The Swiss actor and writer Yanghom Brauen debuted as director. The script for the screwball comedy was written with the co-writer and actor Gerild Wunsterl. They intended to give an inside view on struggling artists and writers, their instincts to survive in the movie business and their ambitions to make a 'hit' in Hollywood despite all odds. While casting, Yangzom Brauen and Shari Yantra Marcacci (producer) found an 'eye catcher' being Jordan Carver making her screen debut with Swiss award winning actress Melanie Winiger, Max Loong and Carlos Leal. The premiere in Zürich was a factored flop: Swiss movies have it just hard when the home crowd, and the simultaneously held Zürifäscht and the high-summer weather, tolf zhr film distributor Jonas Frei of the Swiss distributor Moviebiz to the media. The director Yangzom Brauen did otherwise expect the flop. I am proud that we were in the cinemas ... a sequel is already planned ... only dependent on the funding.»

== Release ==
The Swiss comedy celebrated their premiere on 13 February 2013 in Los Angeles, where the audience responded very positively; and on 4 July 2013 in the Swiss cinemas: just 600 spectators, of which 300 were premiere guests, visited the cinema release in Zurich. Broadcast on television was carried out for the first time on 5 and 9 December 2013 on the Swiss private channel S1.

=== International film festivals ===
In 2013 Who Killed Jonny was aired and awarded at international six film festivals, among them the Chicago Comedy Festival, Colortape International Film Festival, Costa Rica International Film Festival, FF2 International Film Festival, Hoboken International Film Festival and the Trinidad International Film Festival, where it get very positive response.

=== Reception ===
Although the film flopped in the German-language cinemas, he received mostly positive reviews, and was aired on five US film festivals:

Who Killed Johnny» by Yangzom Brauen is a brewing self-ironic filmmaker comedy.

— Der Landbote, 3 July 2013

Who Killed Johnny is a remarkable feat of guerrilla filmmaking by a group of established Swiss stars, which produced a Swiss comedy with much enthusiasm and without compensation, which breaks many conventions. Yangzom Brauen and her team, consisting of mainly women (Alexa Ihrt as Director of photography, Barbara Landi as editor and Shari Yantra Marcacci as producer), the Swiss comedy is an upgrade missed, that long deserves.

— cineman.ch

The directorial debut of Yangzom Brauen is a non-seen movie at the box-office. No one wants to see «Who killed Johnny», but the low-budget film is pretty good. Solid direction, funny scenes, great cut, grandiose soundtrack and actors who play themselves with much conviction.

— Isabelle Riederer, 20 Minuten on 9 July 2013

An acting career in Hollywood is seen by many people as the ultimate goal. But the chances are small. Nevertheless, a few bold 'confederates' (meaning Swiss people) keep trying to gain a foothold in the dream factory. In the wacky low price comedy «Who Killed Johnny», Melanie Winiger and Carlos Leal take her tireless struggle to find good roles and scripts take the mickey out. That sounds promising.

— Box Office, SRF 1

Instead of an ambiguous reflection on reality and fiction is brewing the irony fatal ... and generates the foreseeable end.

— Neue Zürcher Zeitung, 3 July 2013

Yangzom's lowestbudget comedy «Who Killed Johnny» makes enemies in the Swiss film industry. If a film with virtually no money is so well-done, why then a federal film promotion?

— Irene Widmer, SwissFilms

== Home media ==
The film was released on DVD in German (FSK 12) and English language.

== Accolades ==
- 2013 Chicago Comedy Festival: Best screenplay, winner
- 2013 Colortape International Film Festival: Best director, nomination
- 2013 Costa Rica International Film Festival: Best comedy/feature, winner
- 2013 FF2 International Film Festival: Official selection
- 2013 Hoboken International Film Festival: Best actress, nomination for Melanie Winiger
- 2013 Trinidad International Film Festival: Best comedy feature, winner

== See also ==
- Guerrilla filmmaking
- Swiss diaspora
