= Leon Cheo =

Singaporean film director, producer, and screenwriter

- Born: 1985 (age 40–41); Singapore
- Education: Ngee Ann Polytechnic; Chapman University Singapore
- Occupation: Filmmaker
- Years active: 2007—present
- Website: leoncheo.com

Leon Cheo (born 1985) is a Singaporean film director, producer and screenwriter. He is best known for being the creator, writer and director of the short-form series People Like Us. Its second season was nominated for Best Short-Form Series at the 48th International Emmy Awards, the first Emmy nomination in the category in Singapore’s history.

== Biography ==
Leon Cheo is a graduate of Ngee Ann Polytechnic with a diploma with merit in Film, Sound & Video, with most outstanding academic performance and best film production. He also graduated magna cum laude with a BFA from Chapman University Singapore.

== Career ==
In 2007, Cheo wrote and directed his thesis film Nightless Day (2007), which garnered three Crowbar Awards – Silver for Short Film, Gold for Art Direction, and Silver for Cinematography.

In 2011, Cheo produced Charles Lim’s All the Lines Flow Out (2011), which was featured at the Singapore Biennale 2011, and winning Special Mention at the 68th Venice Film Festival. He also produced the video installations for Boo Junfeng’s Happy & Free (2013) and Liao Jiekai’s Bukit Orang Salah (2013), both of which were featured at the Singapore Biennale 2013.

In 2012, Cheo wrote, directed and produced the short film The Three Sisters (2012), which won Best Short Film at the 2012 NETPAC-Jogja Asian Film Festival.

In 2014 and 2015, Cheo was the Films and Multimedia Producer for Singapore’s 49th and 50th Golden Jubilee National Day Parades.

In 2015, Cheo produced and directed the short film Move Out Notice (2015), which was nominated for Best Script at the 6th Singapore Short Film Awards and broadcast on the Lifetime (Asia) channel. He also produced Boo Junfeng’s Parting, one of the short films in the 7 Letters (2015) omnibus, Singapore’s submission to the 88th Academy Awards for Best Foreign Language Film.

In 2016, Cheo created the short-form series People Like Us, produced in collaboration with Action for AIDS Singapore. The first season of People Like Us won Best Short TV Drama at the 11th ITVFest (The Independent Television Festival), Best Web Drama Series at the Formosa Festival of International Filmmaker Awards, and Best Supporting Actor – Drama at the 8th Indie Series Awards. The second season of People Like Us, released in 2019, was nominated for Best Short-Form Series at the 48th International Emmy Awards, clinching additional nominations for Best Drama Series at the 11th Indie Series Awards, Best Ensemble and Best Show (Episodic) at the 5th New Zealand WebFest and Best Drama at Bilbao Seriesland 2019.

In 2019, Cheo's short film SIN-SFO (2018) won Best Live-Action Short and Best Director at the National Youth Film Awards in Singapore. The film also premiered in-competition at the 25th Austin Film Festival, nominated for Best Narrative Short.

Cheo is an alumnus of Berlinale Talents (2014), Asian Film Academy (2013) and Tokyo Talent Campus (2012).

== Filmography ==
Narrative Shorts

- SIN-SFO (2018) - "Writer/Director/Producer"
- Nuts (2016) - "Writer/Director/Editor"
- Move Out Notice (2015) - "Director/Producer"
- Departure (2013) - "Director"
- Triple X (2012) - "Writer/Director"
- The Three Sisters (2012) - "Writer/Director/Producer"
- Acronym City (2010) - "Director/Producer"
- Swing (2010) - "Writer/Director/Producer"
- Four Dishes (2008) - "Writer/Director"
- Nightless Day (不夜天) (2007) - "Writer/Director"

Short-Form Series

- People Like Us (2016–) - "Writer/Director"

Video Installations

- Happy & Free (2013) - “Producer”
- Bukit Orang Salah (2013) - “Producer”
- All the Lines Flow Out (2011) - "Producer"
