= After Hours (Singaporean TV series) =

2007 Singaporean TV series

- Starring: Linda Liao; Utt Panichkul; Max Loong; Joanne Peh
- Country of origin: Singapore
- No. of seasons: 1
- No. of episodes: 13

Production
- Running time: 22 min (per episode)

Original release
- Network: Channel 5
- Release: 26 March – 25 June 2007

After Hours is a Singaporean drama produced by local TV station MediaCorp. It was broadcast on Mondays at 11:00pm.

== Premise ==
Screen couple Utt and Linda Liao reprised their roles as Gabriel and Ellie from Chase for the show, joined by Joanne Peh and Max Loong as April and Danny. The show starts six months after Chase ends, where Gabriel and Ellie go on holiday together.

April and Ellie are former classmates, now friends. Danny is an old friend of Gabriel, although they lost contact previously. Danny spent some time in the United States, but has returned to Singapore for good. The four of them become good friends and spend time together regularly.

== Cast ==
- Linda Liao as Ellie Chua
- Utt Panichkul as Gabriel Peh
- Max Loong as Danny Mereles
- Joanne Peh as April Tay

== Synopsis ==
At the end of Chase, Gabriel and Ellie went on holiday together. They came back and have been together ever since. Gabriel worked on a huge Breast Cancer Awareness campaign that Lauren Lee (his boss from Mad About Ads) managed to win just as the ad agency was on the brink of closing down.

After the campaign, Lauren finally decided to close Mad About Ads and went to work for the Singapore Breast Cancer Foundation as its head of publicity. David (Gabriel's best friend from Chase) got a good advertising job in Sydney, and moved there. Dora, Gabriel's mother, gave birth and decided to settle down with her pilot husband Uncle John (they married at the end of Chase) in his hometown in Kuala Lumpur. Occasionally, she traveled with him on his overseas flights.

Uncle Rob sold his house and retired to Bintan. Ellie is now staying at one of Uncle Rob's many investments – an apartment downtown. Gabriel starts his own ad agency, Angel Advertising, essentially just Gabriel and Danny, the Creative Director, with no office. Gabriel works from home or various cafes, while Danny does not work much but has a lot of contacts. Gabriel keeps him around because he is cheap. By the start of Season 2, Gabriel has a small but loyal group of clients.

At the end of Chase, Ellie had been forced to close down the vet clinic after a takeover by one of Uncle Rob's friends. When she returned from the vacation with Gabriel, she tried to start up a pet food store. The store ran for about six months, and then closed down when the capital ran out. She is now an Aunt Aggie for pet owners, writing for a pet magazine, MyPet Monthly, while hoping to save some money to open her own pet store chain.

April works as a personal trainer, so Ellie and April often meet at the gym. Danny tries to get free gym sessions from April in order to meet women.

== Episodes ==
Episode	Airdate	Synopsis
1	26 March 2007	Ellie tells Gabriel she loves him for the first time. She is shocked by his reaction. A client of April offers her a large sum of money to go out on a date with him. Danny breaks up with a girl who has catalogued all the stuff she lent or gave him, and now wants everything back.
2	2 April 2007	Verna, an old schoolmate, invites the four friends to her wedding reception at a local hotel. They can't decide what to give her and whether or not to share, ultimately ending in a ridiculous fight. Danny agrees to meet up with an ex-girlfriend he hasn't seen for a while, and he takes her to the cheapest place he can think of – a hawker center. When he wants to rekindle the relationship, she tells him he is too cheap.
3	9 April 2007	April finds out that an old high school crush is coming back and wants to see her. As she has carried a torch for him all these years, she thinks he wants to rekindle their relationship. Meanwhile, during an interview for a woman's magazine, Gabriel and Ellie disagree on how long they have been together. They realize they each have different ways of looking at their relationship.
4	16 April 2007	Ellie is concerned that Gabriel has been exchanging flirty SMS-es with a client. Gabriel thinks it is harmless, but Ellie doesn't think so. Danny loses sleep doing research to impress his new girlfriend. When his wish is granted, he falls asleep during sex.
5	23 April 2007	Things get heated when Danny brings his new girlfriend along with the others for paintballing together. Meanwhile, Ellie is asked by her boss to return a book she borrowed. When she finds out that she has lost it, she decides to steal a copy from Danny's new girlfriend's house.
6	7 May 2007	The four friends spend close to the entire night trying to find a place to eat but can't seem to agree on the venue. Meanwhile, Danny gets an SMS from an unfamiliar number and gets involved in a long chat with the other person, but is shocked when he finds out her identity.
7	14 May 2007	The four friends spend close to the entire night trying to find a place to eat. When they lose a reservation at their favourite restaurant, they can't agree on another place to eat. Meanwhile, Danny gets an SMS from a number he doesn't recognize.
8	21 May 2007	Ellie is asked by her editor to represent the magazine in a charity triathlon. She is overjoyed when she hears that April is also taking part, but friendly competition between the two girls soon turns into bitter rivalry.
9	28 May 2007	TBA
10	4 June 2007	Ellie books a surprise holiday for Gabriel as his birthday present, unaware that he has agreed to a major presentation for a big client on the day they are due to leave. April tries to fight off a teenage former client who has a huge crush on her and stalks her.
11	11 June 2007	April gets a surprise visit from her father. She is shocked when he brings his new girlfriend who is her former schoolmate. Meanwhile, Ellie is asked to babysit her boss' 10-year-old son, who turns out to be a brat.
12	18 June 2007	Danny asks Gabriel for a substantial loan. When Gabriel refuses, it causes a strain in their friendship. Danny borrows money from his girlfriend's rich dad, who turns out to be a loanshark. When Danny breaks up with her, her father comes after him. April gives a cheque as a donation to charity, only to find out that instead of ten dollars, she unwittingly donated one thousand. When Ellie tries to help her, she ends up getting fired from her job.
13	25 June 2007	Danny flees the country to escape the loanshark, who then comes after Gabriel and threatens his life. Siong Yun - April's old flame - shows up out of the blue and proposes to her. He wants her to leave Singapore and her friends to follow him to Australia.
