= Fran Borgia =

Spanish film producer (born 1980)

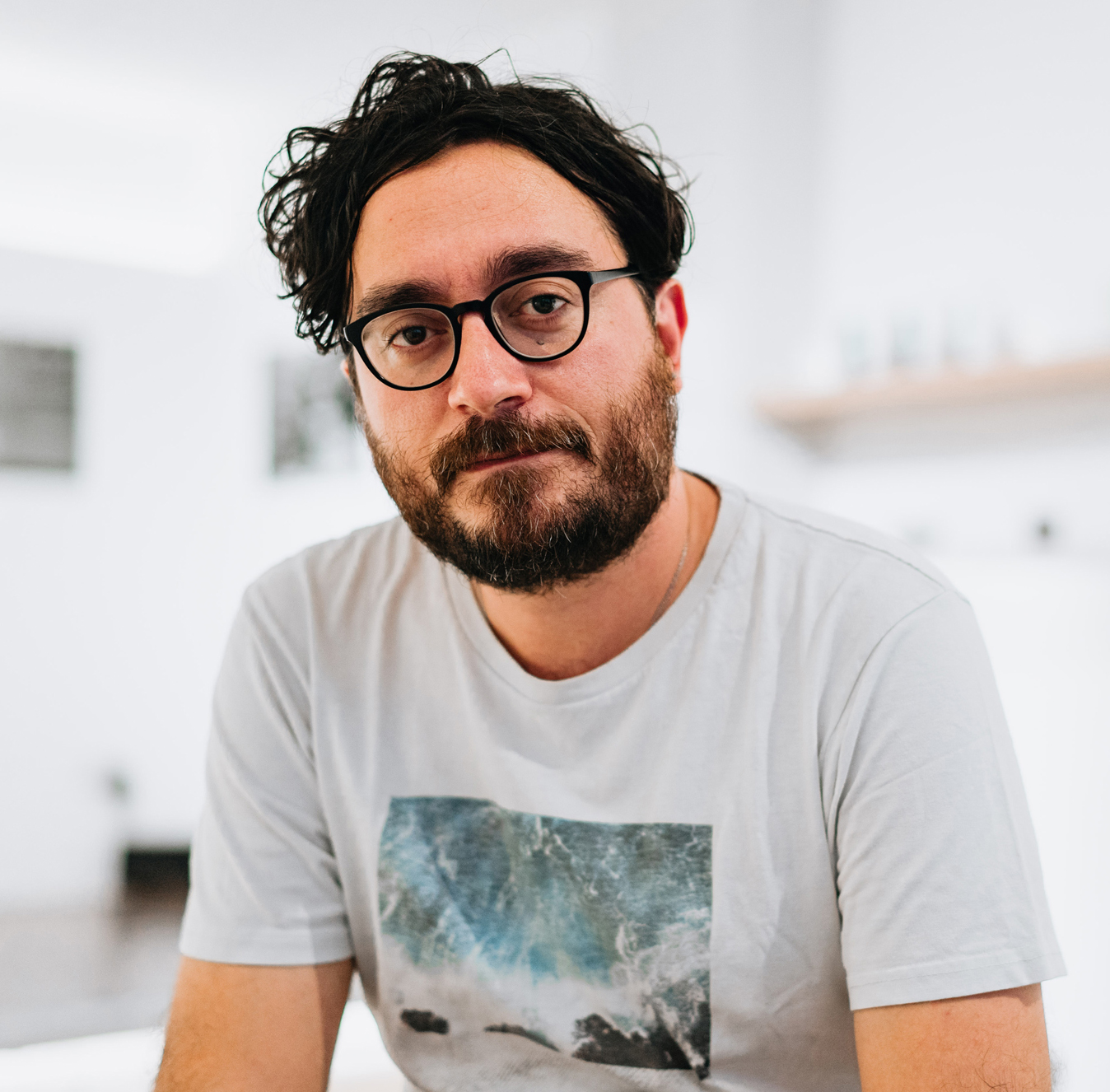
- Born: 1980 (age 45–46); Jerez de la Frontera, Spain
- Education: ESCAC - Cinema and Audiovisual School of Catalonia / University of Barcelona (Spain), LASALLE College of the Arts (Singapore), University of Salamanca (Spain), Auckland University of Technology (New Zealand)
- Occupations: Film producer; Educator
- Years active: 2004–present

Fran Borgia (born 1980) is a Spanish-born film producer based in Singapore since 2004. He is the founder of film production company Akanga Film Asia.

== Career ==
He was the producer and editor for Here (2009), Ho Tzu Nyen’s first feature film that was presented at the 41st Directors’ Fortnight, Cannes Film Festival 2009; and for the medium-length film, Earth, presented at the 66th Venice Film Festival 2009.

Since then he has produced noteworthy feature films such as Sandcastle (2010), Boo Junfeng’s first feature film that premiered at the 49th Cannes Critics’ Week in 2010; Disappearing Landscape by Vladimir Todorovic, which premiered at the 42nd International Film Festival Rotterdam 2013, and Mister John by Christine Molloy & Joe Lawlor, a UK-Ireland-Singapore co-production, which premiered at the Edinburgh International Film Festival 2013.

In 2015, he produced K Rajagopal’s segment for the omnibus feature 7 Letters (2015). In 2016, he co-produced Lav Diaz’s A Lullaby to the Sorrowful Mystery (2016), which won the Silver Bear Alfred Bauer Prize for "a feature film that opens new perspectives" at the 66th Berlin International Film Festival. In the same year, he also produced two films that premiered at the Cannes Film Festival: Boo Junfeng’s Apprentice (2016) at Un Certain Regard and K. Rajagopal’s A Yellow Bird (2016) at International Critics' Week.

In 2017, he produced Liao Jiekai’s segment for the omnibus feature 667 that screened at 22nd Busan International Film Festival. In 2018, he produced Yeo Siew Hua’s A Land Imagined (2018), that won the Pardo d’oro (Golden Leopard) at the Locarno Film Festival.

In 2021, he produced Kamila Andini’s Yuni (2021), an Indonesian-Singapore-French co-production which won the Platform Prize at the 2021 Toronto International Film Festival.

In 2023, he produced Jow Zhi Wei’s Tomorrow Is a Long Time (2023), a Singapore-Taiwanese-French-Portuguese co-production that premiered at the Berlin International Film Festival as part of the Generation 14plus 2023; Amanda Nell Eu’s Tiger Stripes (2023), an 8-country co-production, which premiered at the 2023 Cannes Critics’ Week, and won the Grand Prize; and Chia Chee Sum’s Oasis of Now (2023), which premiered in-competition at the 28th Busan International Film Festival, and had its European premiere at the Berlin International Film Festival as part of the Forum 2024 section.

His latest films are Stranger Eyes (2024), an internationally co-produced mystery thriller film directed by Yeo Siew Hua starring Lee Kang-sheng and Wu Chien-ho, which was the first film from Singapore to compete for the Golden Lion at the Venice International Film Festival; Rima Das' Village Rockstars 2 (2024), and Indian-Singapore Assamese language coming-of-age drama film, sequel to Village Rockstars (2017) which premiered at the 29th Busan International Film Festival on 4 October 2024 and won the Kim Jiseok Award, and was selected in the Generation 14plus section of the 75th Berlin International Film Festival where it had its European premiere on 16 February 2025; and Renoir, a coming-of-age drama film written and directed by Chie Hayakawa. Starring Yui Suzuki, Hikari Ishida, Lily Franky and Ayumu Nakajima, the film follows the childhood of Fuki, in late-1980s Tokyo. The film had its world premiere in the main competition of the 2025 Cannes Film Festival, where it was nominated for the Palme d'Or, and was theatrically released in Japan from 20 June 2025.

On 10 September 2025, he premiered his latest film, Tan Siyou's Amoeba, at the 2025 Toronto International Film Festival. The film won Best Youth Film at the Asia Pacific Screen Awards 2025.

== Filmography ==
=== As producer ===
- Here (2009) (also as film editor and executive producer)
- Sandcastle (2010)
- Disappearing Landscape (2013)
- Mister John (2013)
- 7 Letters (2015)
- A Lullaby to the Sorrowful Mystery (2016)
- Apprentice (2016)
- A Yellow Bird (2016) (also as film editor)
- 667 (2017)
- A Land Imagined (2018)
- Yuni (2021)
- Tomorrow Is a Long Time (2023) (also as executive producer)
- Tiger Stripes (2023)
- Oasis of Now (2023)
- Stranger Eyes (2024) (also as executive producer)
- Village Rockstars 2 (2024)
- City of Small Blessings (2024)
- Skin of Youth (2025)
- Kopitiam Days (2025)
- Renoir (2025) (also as executive producer)
- Amoeba (2025) (also as executive producer)
- Not a Hero (2026)
