= Carlos Leal =

Swiss rapper and actor (born 1969)

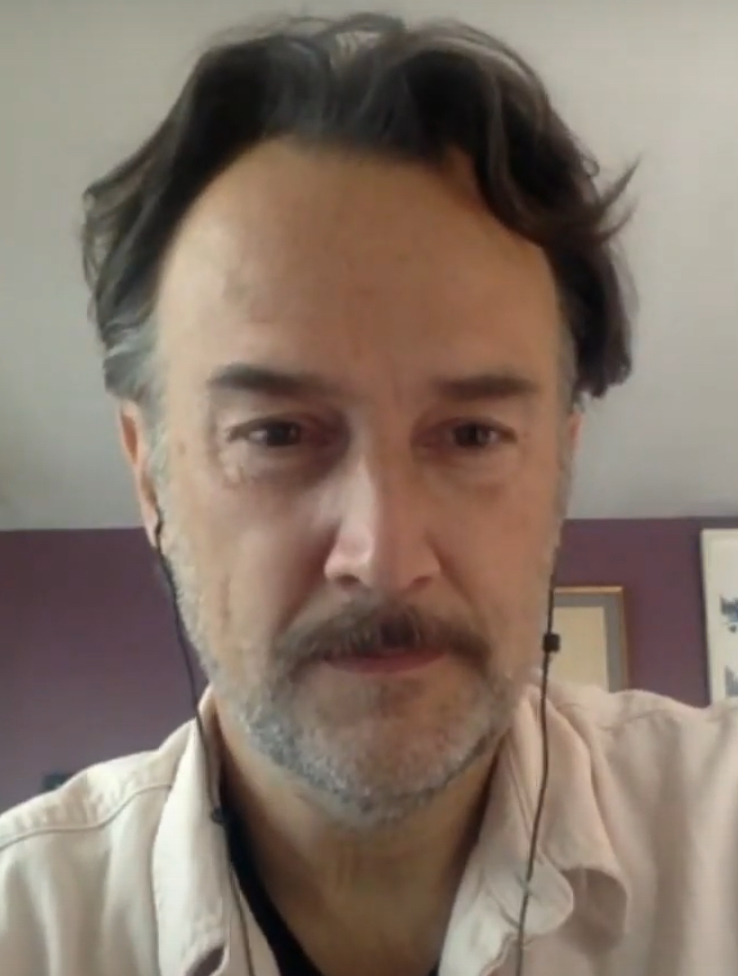
- Leal in 2021

Background information
- Born: July 9, 1969 (age 57); Lausanne, Switzerland
- Genre: Hip hop
- Occupations: Rapper, actor
- Instrument: Vocals

Carlos Leal (born 9 July 1969) is a Swiss rapper and actor.

== Biography ==
Leal was born in Lausanne, Switzerland to Spanish Galician immigrants. In 1990, he co-founded Sens Unik. The group produced four gold records and contributed music to the film Neutre (2001).

He produced videos with Sens Unik, and after making an appearance in the documentary Babylon 2 (1993), Leal decided to pursue a serious acting career. He trained under director Jack Garfein at the Actors Studio in Paris. He made his film debut in Week End Break (2002), a comedy short film, which led to roles in a number of French and Swiss productions.

In 2005, Leal appeared in the Swiss film Snow White, in his first major cinematic role. For his performance, he was awarded the prize for Best Actor at the Africa Film Festival, and Swiss Film Prize for Best Performance in a Leading Role.

In 2006, Leal played the role of croupier and poker tournament organizer in the James Bond film Casino Royale. In 2020, he portrayed Max Epperson aka Bob Weir, in the Netflix film The Last Thing He Wanted.

== Filmography ==
- Week End Break (Switzerland, short subject, 2002) – Phil
- Anomalies passagères (France, TV, 2003) – Le photographe
- Les Amateurs (2003) – Britannicus
- Hildes Reise (Switzerland, 2004) – Monk at monastery
- Love Express (Switzerland, 2004) – Al
- Visite Médicale (Switzerland/France, short subject, 2005) – Le suisse
- Snow White (Switzerland, 2005) – Paco
- Casino Royale (USA, 2006) – Tournament Director
- L'Écart (2007) – Chemist
- El internado (Spain, 2007) – Jaques Noiret
- Day of Disaster (Germany, 2007) – José Rodríguez
- Chef's Special (2008) – Pascal Sánchez
- Dirty Money l'infiltré (2008)
- Broken Embraces (2009)
- Verso (2009) – Victor Preiswerk
- El mal ajeno (2010) – Armand
- The Way (2010) – Jean
- Sennentuntschi (Switzerland/Germany, 2011) – Martin
- La rosa de nadie (2011) – Daniel
- There Be Dragons (2011) – Captain Jorge
- CHAOS (USA, 2011) – Luc Mounia
- Carré Blanc (France, 2011) – Jean Luc
- Looking for Eimish (Spain, 2012) – Kai
- Escape from Tibet (Switzerland/Germany, 2011) – Jean François
- Collision (2013) – Cyril
- Who Killed Johnny (2013) – Marcel, Carlos
- Oro verde (2014) – Augusto
- 20 Rules for Sylvie (Switzerland, 2013) – Adalbert
- The Team (TV series, 2015) – Jean-Louis Poquelin
- Spaceman (2016) – Gino Lapue
- Training Day (TV series, 2017) – Comandante Felix Ruiz "El Jaguar"
- Shooter (TV series, 2017) – Banker for Atlas
- Better Call Saul (TV series, 2018) – Foreign engineer
- Wonder Man (TV series, 2026) – Manuel
