= Max Loong =

Swiss actor

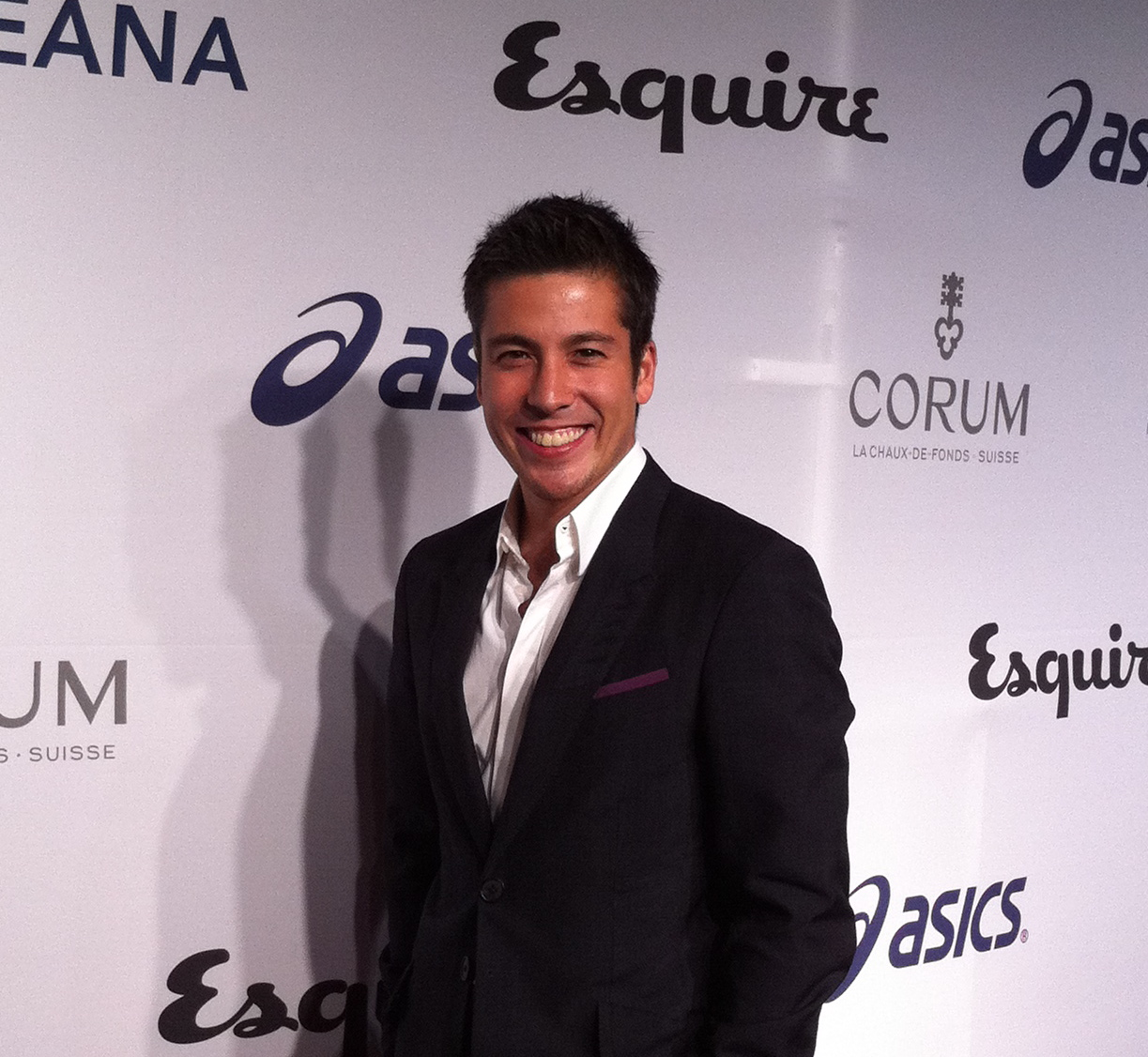
- Occupations: Actor, host
- Website: www.maxloong.com

Max Loong is an actor and television host.

Swiss entertainment magazine Schweizer Illustrierte ranked him as one of the top 100 most important and influential Swiss personalities in 2007.

In the same year, Elle Magazine Singapore awarded him the ‘Breakout Star of the year’ award.

Among some of his works, he has been the host of Musicstar the Swiss equivalent of American Idol, and also filled a role as the lead character (Michael Wong) of Singapore's Emmy nominated comedy First Class.

== Television career ==
At the age of 20, he beat more than 400 other competitors to become the host for the first Swiss music channel, VIVA Schweiz. This was his first foray into hosting.

Shows he has hosted in Europe include Fanta Fiesta (teleprompter), McMusic (requestshow), FreaX (gameshow), Popschau (newsshow), Sunrise (latenightshow) and his own produced hit show Interaktiv (liveshow) where he has interviewed famous artistes such as Britney Spears, Mariah Carey, Usher, 50 Cent, Alicia Keys, Robert Downey Jr. and Pierce Brosnan to name a few.

He has also hosted MTV Southeast Asia, "MTV Mobbed" Gamepad (gameshow), Pop 10 (chartshow), Pop Inc. (life-style show) and red carpet coverage of the MTV Asia Awards 2006 in Bangkok (Thailand).

In November 2006, Loong was chosen as one of the two hosts for Musicstar, which is the Swiss equivalent of American Idol.

In 2008 and 2009, Loong also hosted reality- and entertainment shows such as the S-Factor and Mitsubishi Challenge. In late 2008, he signed on for the fourth season of Musicstar in Switzerland.

== Film career ==
In 2003 he acted in leading roles in Swiss movies such as in “Piff Paff Puff”, a movie about gangsters with different racial backgrounds, playing the role of a drug addict.

In Snow White, a film about the high society party scene of Zurich, he played the part of a disc-jockey, and in Breakout, a movie about violent kids locked up in a Swiss youth jail, he portrayed the role of a rapist.

He also had a television drama series named after him, Adventure Max, and appeared in the first two seasons of the French television series Deja Vu and other television shows.

Loong landed a starring role in the Asian dramedy series After Hours, which ran for thirteen episodes. He starred in Singapore's Emmy-nominated comedy series First Class (season one and two) as a young teacher at a dysfunctional school and the 2010 drama “Perfect Deception”.

== Filmography ==
=== Actor ===
Year	Title	Role	Notes
2015	Lion Moms	Richard Lee	Lead Role (Singapore)
2017	Lion Mums 2	Richard Lee	Lead Role (Singapore)
2013	Who Killed Johnny	Max	Lead Role
2011	Perfect Deception	Lucas	Supporting Role (Asia)
2009	First Class 2	Michael Wong	Lead Role (Asia)
2009	Déjà Vu 2	Ming	Supporting Role (France)
2008	First Class 1	Michael Wong	Lead Role (Asia)
2008	Maggie & Me	Rich	Supporting Role (Singapore)
2008	Déjà Vu 1	Ming	Supporting Role (France)
2007	Lifestory	Lionel De Souza	Lead Role (Singapore)
2007	After Hours	Danny Mereles	Lead Role (Asia)
2007	Breakout	Blade	Supporting Role (Europe)
2006	Syndicate:Zeed	Zeed	Lead Role (USA)
2006	The Intervention	Gay	Supporting Role (USA)
2005	Snowwhite	DJ	Supporting Role (Europe)
2004	Piff Paff Puff	Ming	Supporting Role (Switzerland)

=== Host ===
Year	Title	Role	Notes
2009	MusicStar	Host	SF1 Swiss National television
2009	S-Factor	Host	Mediacorp Channel 5 Singapore
2008	Sport Of Kings	Host	Mediacorp Channel 5 Singapore
2008	Mitsubishi Challenge	Host	Mediacorp Channel 5 Singapore
2007	MusicStar	Host	SF1 Swiss National television
2007	New Year's Eve Countdown	Co-Host	Mediacorp Channel 5 Singapore
2006	MTV Mobbed	Host	MTV Asia
2006	MTV Pop Inc.	Co-Host	MTV Asia
2006	MTV Gamepad	Co-Host	MTV Asia
2006	MTV Asia Awards Red Carpet	Host	MTV Asia
2004	VIVA Interaktiv	Host	VIVA Music Channel Switzerland
2004	VIVA Comet Awards	Host	VIVA Music Channel Switzerland
2003	VIVA Popschau	Co-Host	VIVA Music Channel Switzerland
2003	VIVA FreaX	Host	VIVA Music Channel Switzerland
2002	VIVA McMusic	Host	VIVA Music Channel Switzerland
2001	VIVA Sunrise Late Night	Co-Host	VIVA Music Channel Switzerland
2001	VIVA Abenteuer Max	Lead	VIVA Music Channel Switzerland
2000	VIVA Fanta Fiesta	Host	VIVA Music Channel Switzerland

== Awards ==
- Elle Breakout Star of The Year 2007
