= Here (2009 film) =

- Official Picture House Poster
- Directed by: Ho Tzu Nyen
- Written by: Ho Tzu Nyen
- Produced by: Fran Borgia; Michel Cayla; Jason Lai
- Cinematography: Jack Tan
- Edited by: Fran Borgia
- Release dates: May 20, 2009 (Cannes); June 25, 2009 (Singapore)
- Running time: 86 minutes
- Country: Singapore
- Languages: English; Mandarin

Here is a Singaporean film released in 2009, written and directed by Ho Tzu Nyen. The film was selected for screening at the 41st Directors Fortnight section at the Cannes Film Festival and was also nominated for Golden Kinnaree Award in 2009.

== Synopsis ==
Here follows the journey of a man who struggles to make sense of his reality. Reeling from the sudden death of his wife, he loses the will to speak and is interned at Island Hospital. There, he meets strident kleptomaniac Beatrice with whom he forms an inexplicable bond. As the man adjusts to life within, he is selected for an experimental treatment, which forces him to confront the devastating truth behind his past, present, and future.

== Cast ==
- John Low as H
- Jo Tan as B
- Hemang Yadav as Freddie
- George Kuruvilla as Editor
