= Amoeba (2025 film) =

2025 film by Tan Siyou

- Official poster
- Directed by: Tan Siyou
- Written by: Tan Siyou
- Produced by: Fran Borgia
- Starring: Ranice Tay; Nicole Lee; Lim Shi-An; Genevieve Tan; Jack Kao
- Cinematography: Neus Ollé
- Edited by: Félix Rehm
- Production companies: Akanga Film Asia; Volya Films; Les Films d'Antoine; Mararía Films; Widelog Office
- Distributed by: Anticipate Pictures
- Release date: September 4, 2025 (Toronto)
- Running time: 98 minutes
- Countries: Singapore; Netherlands; France; Spain; South Korea
- Languages: English; Mandarin

Amoeba is a 2025 film written and directed by Tan Siyou in her directorial debut. The film is a co-production of Singapore, Netherlands, France, Spain, and South Korea.

The film had its world premiere at the 2025 Toronto International Film Festival on September 4.

== Premise ==
Four students form a gang and resist authoritarian rules at their all-girls school.

== Cast ==
- Ranice Tay as Choo Xin Yu
- Nicole Lee as Vanessa Scarlett Ooi
- Lim Shi-An as Sofia Tay
- Genevieve Tan as Gina Wong
- Jack Kao as Uncle Phoon

== Production ==
In 2019, the project won the Most Promising Project of the Southeast Asian Film Lab, held during the 30th Singapore International Film Festival. It won the Open SEA Fund Award at the Southeast Asia Fiction Film Lab in 2021. In 2022, Tan Siyou participated at the TorinoFilmLab's ScriptLab to develop the screenplay. The project was presented at the 2023 Berlinale Co-Production Market. In August 2024, it participated at the Venice Gap-Financing Market.

In an interview with Deadline Hollywood, Tan revealed that she wanted to explore the themes of conformity and capitalism in Singapore through the film.

== Release ==
Amoeba had its world premiere at the 2025 Toronto International Film Festival at the Discovery section on September 4. In August 2025, it was reported that Diversion acquired the film's international sales rights. It was also screened in the A Window on Asian Cinema section of the 30th Busan International Film Festival on September 18, 2025.

== Reception ==
=== Critical reception ===
On the review aggregator website Rotten Tomatoes, 100% of 13 critics' reviews are positive. Writing for RogerEbert.com, Brian Tallerico praised the film for "staying true" to the protagonists. Namrata Joshi of The New Indian Express commended how the film explored "a teenage girl's inner transformation and personal assertiveness".

=== Accolades ===
Award / Film Festival	Date of ceremony	Category	Recipient(s)	Result	Ref.
Pingyao International Film Festival	30 September 2025	Fei Mu Award for Best Actress	Ranice Tay	Won	
Pingyao International Film Festival	30 September 2025	Youth Jury Award	Tan Siyou	Won	
Pingyao International Film Festival	30 September 2025	Cinephilia Critics' Award	Tan Siyou	Won	
QCinema International Film Festival	19 November 2025	New Horizons for Best Film	Tan Siyou	Won	
Golden Horse Awards	22 November 2025	Best New Director	Tan Siyou	Nominated	
Golden Horse Awards	22 November 2025	FIPRESCI Prize	Tan Siyou	Won	
Golden Horse Awards	22 November 2025	NETPAC Award	Tan Siyou	Nominated	
Golden Horse Awards	22 November 2025	Taiwan Film Critics Society Award	Tan Siyou	Won	
Asia Pacific Screen Awards	27 November 2025	Best Youth Film	Tan Siyou and Fran Borgia	Won	
