= Melanie Winiger =

Swiss-Canadian actress and model (born 1979)

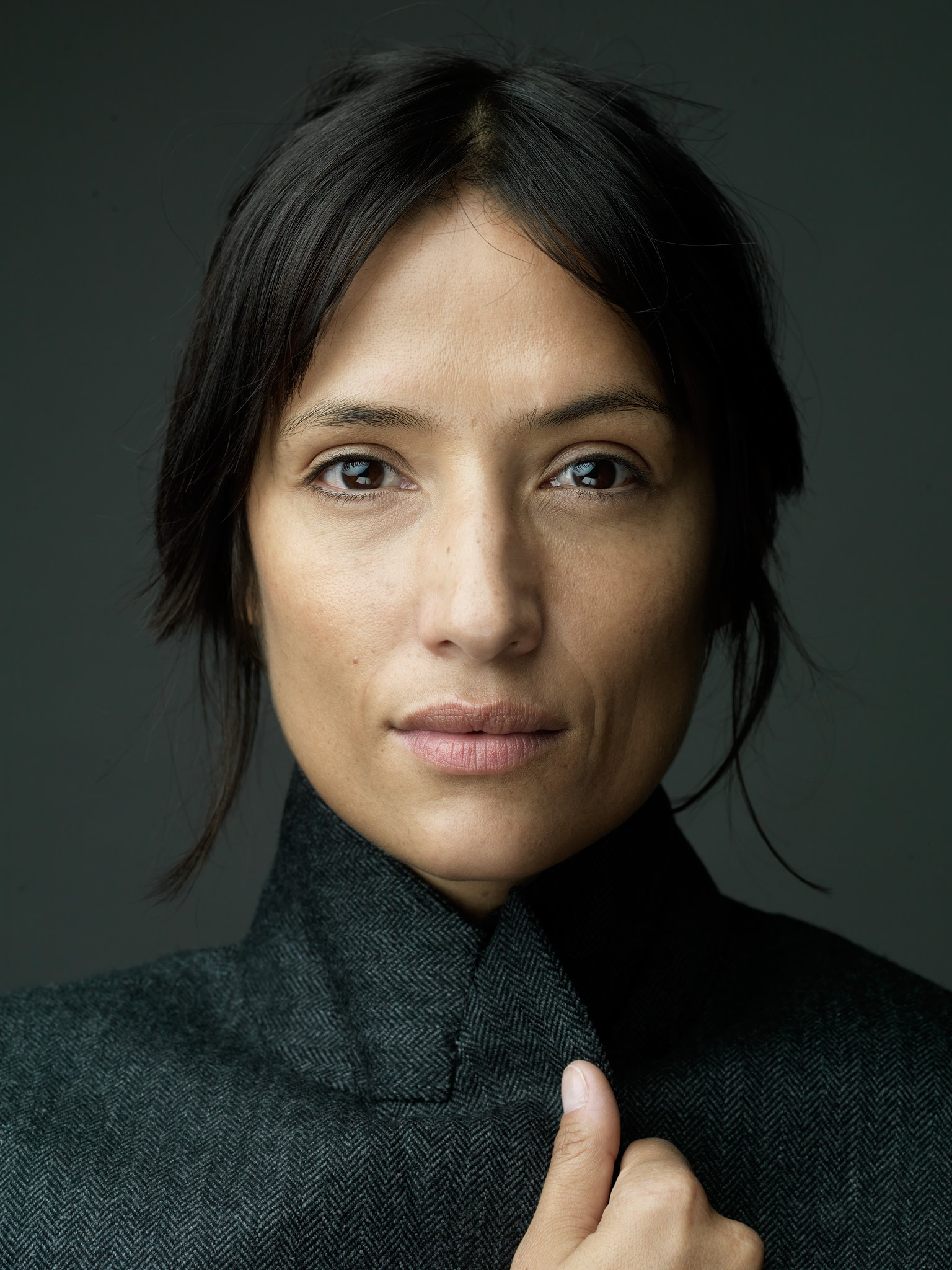
- Winiger in 2019
- Born: Melanie Ann Winiger; 22 January 1979 (age 47); Zürich, Switzerland
- Education: Lee Strasberg Theatre and Film Institute
- Occupations: Actress; model
- Known for: Former Miss Switzerland 1996
- Spouses: Andres Andrekson (m. 2008; div. 2012) Reto Ardour (m. 2017; div. 2021)
- Partners: Andreas Roth (2000-2003); Timo Todzi (2022-present)
- Children: 1
- Website: Official website

Melanie Ann Winiger (born 22 January 1979) is a Swiss actress, model and beauty pageant titleholder who won Miss Switzerland 1996.

== Early life and education ==
Winiger was born 22 January 1979 in Zürich, Switzerland to Carol Winiger (née Latimer; born 1949) and Philipp Marcus Winiger (born 1952), a former drummer and model, who would later turn into a jewelry business owner. Her father is Swiss and her mother is Canadian of partial Indian descent.

In her early childhood, Winiger parents moved to Losone in Ticino where she was primarily raised and attended schools. She dropped out of high school to pursue her modeling career. Winiger later studied acting for two years at the Lee Strasberg Theatre and Film Institute in Los Angeles.

== Modelling career ==
Winiger won Miss Switzerland in 1996 and represented her country at Miss World 1996 in Bangalore, India and at Miss Universe 1997 in Miami, Florida, not placing in either pageant. Winiger worked as a model in Cape Town, New York, Milan, and Munich in the late 1990s. Around the same time, she gained fame in Switzerland as a TV host and endorser of the Italian boutique chain Oviesse.

== Acting ==
In 2003, Winiger starred in the Swiss movie Achtung, fertig, Charlie!

Winiger subsequently moved to Los Angeles, where she attended the West Hollywood branch of the Lee Strasberg Theatre and Film Institute until 2005. Since then, Winiger has starred in both American and Swiss film and TV productions, including Sonjas Rückkehr, Love Made Easy, Breakout, and Heldin der Lüfte.

In 2008, Winiger starred in a TV commercial for Moschino, which was aired in several European countries.

== Filmography ==
=== Film theatre releases ===
- 2003 – Ready, Steady, Charlie! (Achtung, fertig, Charlie!), Swiss Army comedy (Swiss-German) Ready, Steady, Charlie!
- 2006 – Love Made Easy, Road movie (English)Love Made Easy
- 2007 – Breakout
- 2011 - One Way Trip 3D
- 2011 - Resturlaub
- 2013 - Who Killed Johnny,Who Killed Johnny
- 2017 - Lommbock

=== TV Films ===
- 2006 – Sonjas Rückkehr
- 2008 – Heldin der Lüfte, featuring REGA air rescue (Swiss-German)Heldin der Lüfte
- 2010 - Sonntagsvierer
- 2016 - Spuren der Rache

== Awards ==
- 2013 – Hoboken International Film Festival: Best actress, nomination for Who Killed Johnny

== Presenter ==
On 28 August 2008, she hosted the draw for UEFA Champions League groups, which took place at the Grimaldi Forum in Monaco. She hosted the draw again at the same place on 26 August 2010, this time for 2010–11 Champions League and again on 25 August 2011 for the 2011-12 Champions League. Winiger was the host for the opening ceremony at the 61st FIFA Congress.

Again on 27 August 2015 hosted the draw for the group stage of the UEFA Champions League 2015-16 which took place at the Grimaldi Forum in Monaco. On 8 July 2017, she hosted the World Boxing Super Series draw.
