= A Yellow Bird =

- Film poster
- Directed by: K. Rajagopal
- Written by: K. Rajagopal; Jeremy Chua
- Produced by: Fran Borgia; Jeremy Chua; Claire Lajoumard
- Starring: Sivakumar Palakrishnan; Huang Lu; Seema Biswas
- Cinematography: Michael Zaw
- Edited by: Fran Borgia
- Production companies: Akanga Film Asia; Acrobates Films
- Release dates: 18 May 2016 (Cannes); 8 December 2016 (Singapore)
- Running time: 112 minutes
- Countries: Singapore; France
- Languages: Tamil; Mandarin; English

A Yellow Bird is a 2016 Singaporean-French drama film directed and co-written by K. Rajagopal and starring Sivakumar Palakrishnan, Huang Lu, and Seema Biswas. It was screened in the Critics' Week section at the 2016 Cannes Film Festival.

== Plot ==
Siva (Sivakumar Palakrishnan) a Singaporean-Indian man is released after in prison for contraband smuggling. Unable to find forgiveness from his mother, he begins a quest to locate his ex-wife and daughter. Just as he finds solace and hope in the company of an illegal Chinese prostitute (Huang Lu), he is confronted with an unbearable truth about his family. How far he will go in order to redeem himself from guilt?

== Cast ==
- Sivakumar Palakrishnan as Siva
- Huang Lu
- Seema Biswas as Siva's mother
- Udaya Soundari as Pavani
- Nithiyia Rao
- Indra Chandran
