= Jordan Carver =

German Entrepreneur, Model

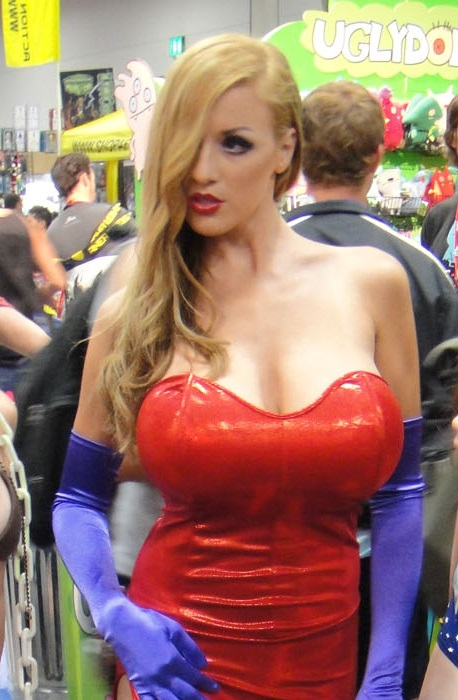
- Carver, as Jessica Rabbit in 2011
- Citizenship: German
- Occupations: Entrepreneur; model
- Years active: 2008–2017
- Spouse: Shaffy H (2017)
- Modeling information
- Hair color: Brunette
- Eye color: Brown

Jordan Carver is a retired German glamour model and actress.

== Early life ==
After graduating from secondary school and vocational school, Carver worked as a hotel manager. She also worked behind-the-scenes as a beautician and make-up artist for a large French cosmetic company. Carver met a photographer who encouraged her to become a model and moved to Los Angeles.

== Career ==
In January 2010, Carver launched her modelling career with her own website featuring glamour photos, videos and other content. In addition to her own exclusive content, Carver began posing for magazine publications in 2011. In February, she posed for British men's magazine Zoo Weekly and in June for the Italian fetish magazine Alula. At the same time, she was receiving media publicity in her native Germany.

Carver was featured in the German Bild magazine, which proclaimed her as "Yoga-Jordan", due to her yoga workouts. In January 2012, she was featured in the American tabloid and entertainment television show TMZ. In late 2012, Carver released a yoga workout DVD that became available in both the United States and Europe. In addition to her features in publications, she also appeared on many YouTube videos, and the WGN Morning News in Chicago.

In 2013, Carver made her acting debut in the German-American comedy Who Killed Johnny, in which she appeared as a naïve German model named Gudrun. From July to August 2013, she participated on the German reality show Wild Girls – Auf High Heels durch Afrika (Wild Girls - In High Heels Through Africa), in which she along with other participants lived in the deserts of Namibia with the indigenous people. Carver was voted off the show on 14 August.

Carver briefly trained as a boxer, fighting Melanie Muller in 2014 in Düsseldorf as part of "Das Grosse Prosieben Promiboxen" event.

In 2017, Carver said that she no longer identified with the public figure "Jordan Carver" and was starting a new chapter in her life.

== Personal life ==
Carver gave birth to a son in December 2016, and a daughter in July 2020. The daughter's father is her partner since 2019, former professional footballer Umut Kekilli.

== See also ==
- List of Nuts Magazine models
