= Sivakumar Palakrishnan =

Singaporean actor, producer and director

- Born: Singapore
- Occupations: Actor, producer, director
- Years active: 2005–present
- Known for: A Yellow Bird, Tanglin, Sunny Side Up

Sivakumar Palakrishnan is a Singaporean actor, producer, and director. He is known for his lead role in A Yellow Bird (2016), which premiered at Cannes Critics' Week, and for his performances in Mediacorp television dramas including Tanglin and Sunny Side Up. He won the ASEAN Film Award for Best Actor in 2017 and was a National Winner at the Asian Academy Creative Awards in 2025.

== Career ==
Sivakumar has appeared in numerous productions across film, television, and theatre in Singapore. His work spans English-, Tamil-, and Mandarin-language productions across mainstream television and independent film in Singapore.

In film, he starred as **Siva** in A Yellow Bird (2016), a Singapore–French co-production directed by K. Rajagopal that premiered in Cannes Critics’ Week. His performance was recognised with the ASEAN Film Award for Best Actor in 2017. He later appeared in the psychological drama Repossession (2019), and in the comedy-drama #LookAtMe (2022).

On television, Sivakumar was part of the long-running Channel 5 drama Tanglin, and appeared in Vasantham and Channel 5 programmes such as Sunny Side Up (2022–2024), Reunion (2021), Naam (2022), and Folklore (2018) on HBO Asia.

In addition to acting, Sivakumar has directed programmes for Mediacorp and independent platforms. He directed the short film Fiona, My Friend (2020) for Viddsee Originals, and was credited as director for the Vasantham television comedy series Thiru Valluvan (2011).

== Filmography ==
=== Film ===
Year	Title	Role	Notes
2006	Naalai	Singapore Siva	Credited appearance (end credits at 2:05:18 of official YouTube video)
2016	A Yellow Bird	Siva	Lead role; screened at Cannes Critics’ Week
2019	Repossession	Vinod	
2022	#LookAtMe	The Warden	

=== Television ===
Year(s)	Title	Role	Notes
2017–2018	Tanglin	–	Channel 5 drama
2022–2024	Sunny Side Up	–	Mediacorp Vasantham
2021	Reunion	–	Vasantham mini-series
2022	Naam	–	Vasantham drama
2018	Folklore (ep. "Nobody")	Arup	HBO Asia series

=== Directing ===
- Fiona, My Friend (2020) – short film, Viddsee Originals
- Thiru Valluvan (2011) – Vasantham comedy series (credited as director)

== Awards and nominations ==
Year	Award	Category	Work	Result	Ref
2017	ASEAN International Film Festival & Awards	Best Actor	A Yellow Bird	Won	
2011	Pradhana Vizha	Best Actor	Veethi Varai	Won	
2022	Pradhana Vizha	Best Supporting Actor (Limited Drama Series)	Kalaiyarasi Vayadhu 47, Vaagana Ottunar	Won	
2025	Asian Academy Creative Awards (Singapore National Winner)	Best Actor in a Comedy Role	Kaathu Karuppu	Won	
2026	Pradhana Vizha	Best Actor	Kaathu Karuppu	Nominated	
2026	Pradhana Vizha	Best Supporting Actor	Pithamagan	Nominated	
