= INRI studio =

Film production house from Singapore

INRI studio is an independent production house from Singapore, founded by cult director Tzang Merwyn Tong in 1999. The studio has - to this date - produced two films, A Wicked Tale and e’Tzaintes, both of which premièred in the international film festival circuit.

== History ==
INRI studio was a concept that came about in 1999 when Tzang Merwyn Tong and long time friend Armen Rizal Rahman, an aspiring musician, decide that it was time they band together to create a production company they can call their own. They roped in Lee Amizadai and together the unit identified themselves as INRI studio.

The trio went on to make their very first film together. Using their scrap earnings and savings that they have accumulated over the years, the team of film-makers started work on their first film e’Tzaintes. The film's a teenage black comedy about a bunch of social outcasts. It was a project that took them 3 years to complete.

e’Tzaintes went to travel to a couple of film festivals. It premièred in Europe in 2004 as the Opening Night Film of the Berlin Asia-Pacific Film Festival and was screened as part of the Asian New Force at the Hong Kong IFVA Festival.

The studio then embarked on their second film, A Wicked tale, starring Evelyn Maria Ng as the Little Red Riding Hood character in Tzang Merwyn Tong’s dark re-imagination of the Brothers Grimm fable. The film made its World Premiere to a full house crowd at the Rotterdam International Film Festival and was later invited to FanTasia Film Festival to be screened as one of the Closing Night films. The movie won the Gold Remi Award at WorldFest in Houston. In December 2005, INRI studio made history by being the first short film in Singapore to be released commercially on DVD.

The INRI studio collective now consists of artists, writers, musicians and filmmakers. An underground music project is currently in the pipeline.

== Etymology ==
The word INRI is inspired by the inscription on the cross from which Jesus Christ was crucified. INRI is a Latin acronym for Iesus Nazarenus Rex Iudaeorum (literally translated as Jesus of Nazareth King of Jews). The letters can be found inscribed on a stylized plaque (or parchment) hanging just above the corpse of Christ on many depictions of the Crucifixion.

== Official filmography ==
- e’Tzaintes giving self-deceit a better name (2003)
- A Wicked tale (2005)
