= A Wicked Tale =

- A Wicked Tale poster, 2005
- Directed by: Tzang Merwyn Tong
- Written by: Tzang Merwyn Tong
- Starring: Evelyn Maria Ng; Johan Ydstrand; Wolf Danker; Catherine Sng
- Production company: INRI studio
- Release date: 2005
- Running time: 45 minutes
- Country: Singapore

A Wicked Tale is a 2005 Singaporean experimental short film written and directed by Tzang Merwyn Tong. The film premiered to at the 34th Rotterdam International Film Festival.

This low-budget film is a dark reimagining of the Little Red Riding Hood fable. A Wicked Tale was released in its uncut version on DVD in December 2005 in Singapore along with INRI studio's debut film, e'TZAINTES.

It won a Gold Remi Award at the 2005 WorldFest in Houston, US.

== Storyline ==
Beth, a curious little girl with a fascination for the forbidden meets a mysterious stranger in the woods. She suddenly becomes aware of her own sexuality. Like all teenagers, she wants to know how far she can go before she makes her escape. Gingerly, she flirts along, allowing herself to be manipulated by her seducer, thinking that she can shy away from his bestial intentions unscathed...

== Cast ==
- Evelyn Maria Ng as Beth
- Johan Ydstrand as Louis Le Bon
- Wolf Danker as Uncle Charlie
- Catherine Sng as Grandmama

== Release ==
A Wicked Tale made its world premiere at the 34th International Film Festival Rotterdam. It won the Gold Remi Award at the WorldFest of the Houston International Film Festival and was selected to be the closing night film of the 2005 Montreal Fantasia International Film Festival. Its Asian premiere was at the 18th Singapore International Film Festival.

It has since become a cult film.
