= Performing Arts Festival =

Festival in Mumbai, India

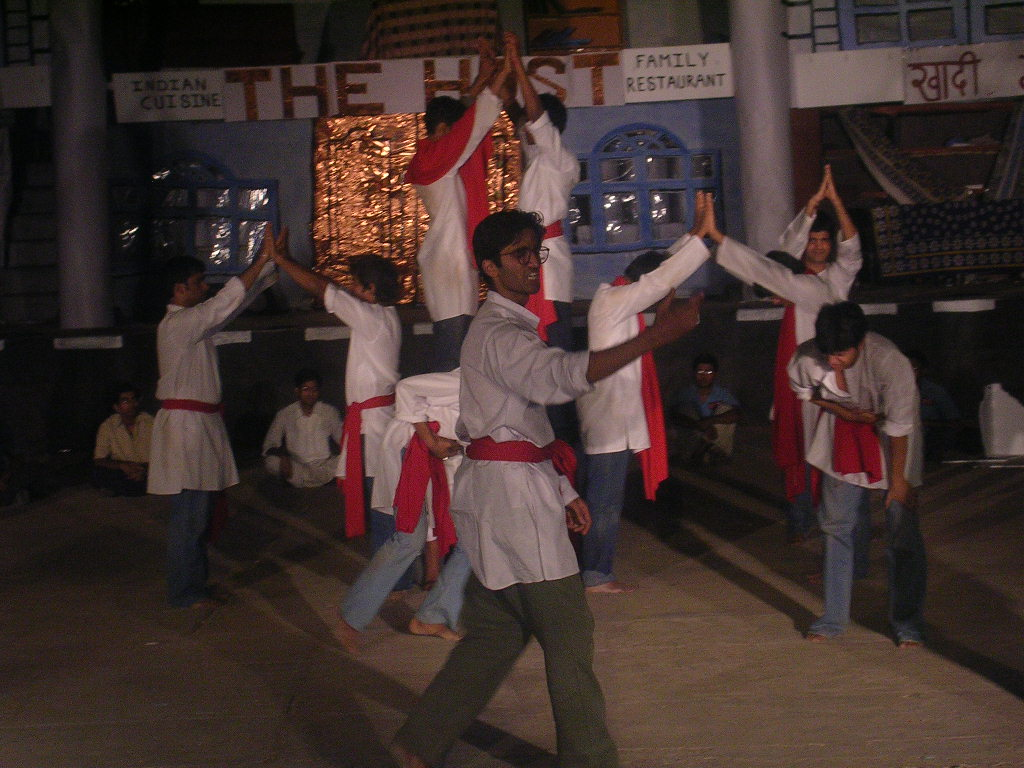
H3-H6 PAF Dastak, introducing street play as a sub-drama in the PAF

The Performing Arts Festival, abbreviated as PAF, is the biggest inter-hostel cultural competition in the Indian Institute of Technology Bombay located at Powai in Mumbai (India). The term PAF is used to refer not only to the festival itself, but also to the individual cultural performances that constitute the festival.

Both undergraduate and graduate students at IIT Bombay participate in the preparation and organization of the festival. Typically six hostels (out of eighteen) are grouped together by random draw for each PAF. Though technically a drama, each PAF comprises contributions from several of the cultural arts including dramatics, literature, music, fine arts, debating and dance. Since 1999, the PAF has been held at the Open Air Theater (OAT) inside the Students' Activity Center (SAC), within the main campus of IIT Bombay. Typically, all dialogues at PAF are delivered using voice overs and not by the actors themselves, mainly owing to the large size and structure of the OAT. This requires co-ordination between the actors and the voice actors.

== Production (Prod) ==
A scene from Déja Vu by Hostels 1, 4, 9 and 11 on 28 March 2006

One of the major tasks of a PAF, and the most unique one, is the preparation of the sets by fellow students. It is commonly called prod or prodwork, abbreviations for productions. Prod consists of making sets using bamboo, jute rope and screens made with layers of newspaper glued together by freshmen and seniors in co-operation. Structures strong enough to hold the weight of several people are prepared. In the PAF of 2007, for instance, a two-storeyed set was made in order to give the dramatists a chance to perform at an elevated level.

Production sets require the maximum amount of man hours to put them in place. Building of production sets (usually from bamboo) starts about a month before the PAF. The teams are allowed 3 days to install the sets and perform the finishing touches in the Open Air Theater.

== Theme and language ==
PAFs can be made in Hindi or English. Themes chosen are usually serious and have been drawn from history, science fiction, social injustice, biographies etc. The only caveat is that the scripts are expected to be original.

== Grouping ==
Though seemingly random, the teams are formed in a way that ensures fair chance for each. The pool of hostels is split into tiers based on their overall standings in the inter hostel cultural general championships (GCs) held throughout the year. The tiers then get split and mixed with other tiers either through a draw or mutual consensus.

== Major changes ==
- 2004 - Hostel 1 becomes a regular participant, having appeared only thrice in the past eleven years.
- 2006 - Number of PAFs brought down from five to four. The maximum team size increases to four.
- 2014-15 - New hostels 15 and 16 get added to the hostel pool.
- 2016 - The number of PAFs was brought down by one, to three in total, owing to the burden on resources and budget constraints. The teams now consist of six hostels each, the largest till date.
- 2020-21 - No PAFs were held due to the COVID-19 pandemic.
- 2022 - Due to a gap of 3 years, it was difficult to put up PAF as only few students in the institute had seen and experienced PAF. Hence, only one PAF was held, performed jointly by all the hostels.
- 2023 - Two PAFs were performed, in an attempt to slowly increase the number.

== Recent PAFs ==
The PAF season is at IIT Bombay during the last fortnight of March and the first week of April each year, officially culminating all the extracurricular activities of IIT Bombay for that academic year. Some recent PAFs include:

^{T} = Tie
Main language used is Hindi unless stated otherwise

Year	PAF Name	Hostels	Date	Overall position	Individual awards	Description	Ref.
2023	Punaravrati	1, 3, 5, 6, 10, 13, 14, 16C, 17	Apr 2	Runner-Up			
2023	Sindhu Afsaana	2, 4, 9, 11, 12, 15, 16AB, 17, 18, Tansa	Apr 7	Winner	Script, Acting, Voice Over, Production, Music, Direction, Fine Arts, Lights, Costumes, Dance, Video, Gem of PAF		
2022	Adwaita	1, 2, 3, 4, 5, 6, 9, 10, 11, 12, 13, 14, 15, 16, 17, 18, Tansa	Apr 10				
2019	Tabeer Shanakht and have you heard the tale of a butterfly?	4, 6, 8, 13, 15C, Tansa	Mar 29	Runner-Up			
2019	Kuttay	1, 2, 5, 10, 14, 15B	Apr 3	Winner	Script, Acting, Voice Over, Production, Music, Direction, Lights, Costumes, Dance, Video		
2019	Dopamine	3,7,9,11,12, 16C	Apr 8	2nd Runner-up	Fine Arts		
2018	Sandarsh	1, 3, 8, 10, 12, 16B	Mar 28		Costumes, Dance		
2018	Khaled	2, 7, 9, 14, 15B, 15C	Apr 2		Script		
2018	Aseer-e-Hayat	4, 5, 6, 11, 13, Tansa	Apr 7		Production, Acting, Voice-overs, Lights, Video, Fine Arts, Music, Direction		
2017	A Silent Song	1, 3, 4, 10, 13, 15B	Mar 21	2nd Runner-Up	Voice-overs, Dance^{T}	Based on the hardships of the relation between a father and a daughter. Elements in the dances were highly appreciated. Fusion of four different dance forms in one was the main attraction.	
2017	Nazariya	6, 7, 8, 11, 12, Tansa	Mar 26	Runner-Up		Depicted the dilemmas one faces and how our opinions are essentially biased based on our perspectives. It stressed on not following the herd mentality and not having blind faith.	
2017	Rannbhoomi	2, 5, 9, 14, 15C, 16B	Mar 31	Winner	Script, Acting, Lights, Costumes, Music, Direction, Dance^{T}, Video, Prod, Fine Arts	Won 10 out of 11 trophies; was a poignant depiction of the intertwined and vicious political scenario and the effect it has on university students. It showed the struggle for freedom of expression, religious turmoil and how far some people go to get political benefits.	
2016	Daira	2, 5, 7, 13, 15C, Tansa	Mar 22	Runner-Up	Acting, Music, Direction, Dance	Specially applauded for dance and music; Depicted a girl’s dilemma over her sexuality while being pushed into a marriage; Portrayed the taboo of same sex marriage in Indian society	
2016	Apratyaksh	1, 4, 9, 10, 14, 16B	Mar 27	Winner	Lights, Costumes, Video	Revolved about the theme as how deception could be used for power. It narrated the story of a "Behroopiya" who lures an entire kingdom into believing his immaculate acting and his "Swaangs" and overthrows the king to ascend the throne.	
2016	Muntazir	3, 6, 8, 11, 12, 15B	Apr 01	2nd Runner-Up	Script, Voice-over, Prod, Fine Arts	Production included a mini-bus sized movable ship	
2015	Keta (English)	2, 3, 11, 14, 15A	Mar 22	Runner-Up	Dance, Lights, Prod, Video	Won Gem of the PAF for Underwater Dance Element	
2015	Pahal	7, 9, 10A, 12, 16C	Mar 25	2nd Runner-Up	Acting, Music		
2015	Discovery of Indya	1, 5, 8, 10	Mar 28	Winner	Script, Direction, Voice-over, Acting, Video	Revolves around a court case where a writer is indicted for writing a controversial book on the political leaders of India around the independence era	
2015	Aahuti	4, 6, 13, 15C, Tansa	Mar 31	3rd Runner-Up	Prod, Costumes, Fine Arts	Portrayed the character of Chanakya, the Indian teacher, philosopher, economist, jurist and royal advisor and his role in shaping the establishment of the Maurya Empire under the reign of Chandragupta Maurya	
2014	Lohar	4, 5, 11, 13, Tansa	Mar 23	3rd Runner-Up	Script		
2014	Pehchaan	1, 6, 9, 10	Mar 26	Joint Winner	Acting, Voice-over, Music, Direction, Video (Trailer)		
2014	Kolahal	7, 8, 14, 10A, TypeC quarters	Mar 29	2nd Runner-Up	Prod		
2014	Ekla Cholo Re	2, 3, 12, 15	Apr 01	Joint Winner	Dance, Costumes, Lights, Fine Arts (Aesthetics)	Based on the life of Indian physicist Satyendra Nath Bose	
2013	Satrangi	3, 7, 13, 14	Mar 15	3rd Runner-Up			
2013	Mandali	5, 9, 12	Mar 18	Winner	Music^{T}, Fine Arts (Aesthetics), Prod^{T}, Script, Voice-over, Costumes, Lights^{T}	Greatly applauded for its stage setup, aesthetics and music	
2013	Delhi Beats	2, 8, 11, Tansa	Mar 21	Runner-Up	Acting, Dance, Direction (Staging), Video (Film)	Set against the sensitive backdrop of rape, molestation and eve-teasing in Delhi	
2013	Bisaat	1, 4, 6, 10	Mar 25	2nd Runner-Up	Music^{T}, Prod^{T}, Lights^{T}		
2012	Maun	2, 9, 10	Mar 21	Runner-Up		(Hindi: मौन, lit., Silence)	
2012	Aawhan	4, 6, 12, 14	Mar 25				
2012	Antbahaar	1, 3, 11, 13	Mar 29	Winner	Music, Prod, Costumes, Voice-over, Dance (Choreography), Direction, Lights, Script, Fine Arts	(Hindi: अंत बहार, lit., Last Drop Of Spring); Winning 9 out of 9 different aspects of PAF	
2012	Prime Minister (English)	5, 7, 8, Tansa	Apr 02	2nd Runner-Up		Strongly based on the life of Rajiv Gandhi, the prime minister of India who was assassinated by the LTTE	
2011	Zoon	3, 5, 10	Mar 25	Runner-Up	Music, Prod, Costumes	Urdu: rich Hindi	
2011	Golden Quadrilateral	2, 8, 12, 13	Mar 29	Winner	Voice-over, Dance (Choreography), Screenplay, Lights		
2011	Walong	4, 9, 14	Apr 03	2nd Runner-Up^{T}			
2011	Chashm-E-Nam	1, 6, 7, 11	Apr 07	2nd Runner-Up^{T}	Script		
2010	Ramleela	4, 10, 13	Mar 18	3rd Runner-Up		(Hindi: रामलीला, lit., Ram's play)	
2010	Panchhi re	1, 3, 9, 12	Mar 22	Winner	Script, Dance, Screenplay, Acting, Voice-over	(Hindi: पंछी रे, lit., O' Bird);	
2010	Mai Mati	5, 6, 11	Mar 26	Runner-Up	Music, Costumes	(lit., My soil)	
2010	Antaragni	2, 7, 8, Tansa	Mar 30	2nd Runner-Up	Prod, Lights	(Hindi: अंतराग्नि, lit., The Fire Within)	
2009	Karvat	5, 9, 12, Tansa	Mar 20	2nd Runner-Up		(Hindi: करवट, lit., Turn aside)	
2009	If Tomorrow Comes	3, 8, 11	Mar 23	Runner-Up			
2009	Najafgarh Express	6, 7, 10	Mar 26				
2009	Arthur Road	1, 2, 4, 13	Mar 30	Winner	All except Music and Costumes		
2008	Arsh	1, 7, 8, 13	Mar 18	2nd Runner-Up		(Urdu: عرش, lit., Throne)	
2008	U-Turn	4, 9, 10	Mar 21	Runner-Up			
2008	1984	5, 6, 12, Tansa	Mar 25				
2008	The Show Goes On...	2, 3, 11	Mar 28	Winner			
2007	Aashayein	3, 8, 10	Mar 18			(Hindi: आशाएँ, lit., Hopes)	
2007	Saare Jahaan Se Achha	1, 5, 11, 13	Mar 21	Winner	Dance (Choreography)	(lit., The Best in the World); Won Gem of PAF for the final choreography sequence	
2007	Numb-D	2, 6, 9	Mar 24				
2007	Good Morning	4, 7, 12	Mar 27				
2006	Asrār	2, 8, 7	Mar 19	2nd Runner-Up	Costumes	(Hindi: असरार, lit., the secret)	
2006	Kharāshen	13, 6, 10, Tansa	Mar 22	Runner-Up	Voice-over	(Hindi: ख़राशें, lit, the scratches)	
2006	Camouflages	3, 5, 12	Mar 25	3rd Runner-Up		The first PAF ever to use the F-word and ‘orgasm’.	
2006	Déjà Vu	1, 4, 9, 11	Mar 28	Winner	7 out of 9	(French, lit., already seen); based on the life of an IITian	
2005	Lāl Rekhā-Ek Marīchikā	2, 7, 11	Mar 20		Script	(Hindi: लाल रेखा-एक मरीचिका, lit., the red line-an illusion)	
2005	Satyoaham	9, 13, Tansa	Mar 23	2nd Runner-Up		(Hindi: सत्योऽहम, lit., I am the truth); Portrayed the conflict between the truth and self-ego.	
2005	Bombay	1, 5, 10	Mar 27	Runner-Up	Acting^{T}, Costume, Prod, Publicity	(Hindi: बॉम्बे); About 3 characters - an actor, a journalist and a local goon - who want to make it big in their respective fields and the way they achieve their goals in the great city of Bombay	
2005	Kastūrī	4, 8, 12	Mar 30			(Hindi: कस्तूरी, lit., musk)	
2005	Dastak	3, 6	Apr 02	Winner	Music, Lights, Direction, Screenplay, Voice-Over, Acting^{T}, Dance (Choreography)	(Hindi: दस्तक, lit., knocking); Based on the life of Safdar Hashmi, great writer, actor and activist	
2004	Āhvān	2, 5	Mar 22	2nd Runner-Up	Acting, Voice-over, Costumes, Dance (Choreography)	(Hindi: आह्वान, lit., invoking)	
2004	Agnihotra	7, 10, Tansa	Mar 26		Publicity	(Hindi: अग्निहोत्र, lit., the fire-sacrifice)	
2004	Far from Vietnam (English)	3, 9, 12	Mar 29				
2004	Asāfeer	6, 8, 11	Apr 01	Runner-Up	Script, Prod, Lights	(Hindi: असाफ़ीर, lit., sparrow); in Urdu-rich Hindi	
2004	Lākshāgrih	1, 4, 13	Apr 04	Winner	Music, Direction	(Hindi: लाक्षागृह, lit., the house made up of shellac)	
2003	Le Peintre de Mort (English)	2, 6	Mar 22			(French, lit., the painter of death)	
2003	Child's Play (English)	4, 11	Mar 25				
2003	Omicidio (English)	9, 10, Tansa	Mar 28			(Italian, lit., the homicide)	
2003	Shānte Mrigayam	3, 5	Apr 07	Winner	All except Dance and Costumes	(Hindi: शान्ते मृगयम्, lit., the peaceful deer)	
2003	Anth	7, 8	Apr 10			(Hindi: अन्त, lit., the end)	
2002	Avshesh	8, 9		Winner	Acting^{T}, Prod, Fine-Arts, Costumes	(Hindi: अवशेष, lit., Residue)	
2002	La Isla dela Musica, La Isla del Amor (English)	2, 10, Tansa	Apr 04	Runner-Up	Acting^{T}, Voice-over, Music, Dance (Choreography)	(Spanish, lit., the island of music, the island of love)	
2002	Aham Brahmasmi	4, 5				(Hindi: अहम् ब्रह्मास्मि, lit., I am Brahman)	
2002	Aahuti	1, 3, 11	Mar 21	2nd Runner-Up		(Hindi: आहुति, lit. the sacrifice)	
2002	14:12 (English)	6, 7				(a Biblical reference)	
2001	Thespian (English)	2, 7		Winner			
2001	Dansh	4, 9				(Hindi: दंश, lit., the snake-bite)	
2001	Asakth	8, 10				(Hindi: आसक्त, lit., the addiction)	
2001	Nimaad	3				(Hindi: निमाड, popular for maa reva, the river Narmada)	
2001	Pratyancha	5, 11		Runner-Up		(Hindi: प्रत्यंचा, lit., the Bowstring)	
2000	Rashtroday	2, 9			Costumes	(Hindi: राष्ट्रोदय, lit., the rise of the nation)	
2000	Al-Qasas	5, 8		Winner	Lights, Prod, Direction, Dance (Choreography), Screenplay^{T}, Music^{T}, Acting^{T}	(Hindi: अल-क़सस, Urdu / Arabic: lit., The Story); Best Actor: Vaibhav Gupta^{T}	
2000	Sarhad	3, 4		Runner-Up	Screenplay^{T}, Music^{T}, Acting^{T}	(Hindi: सरहद, lit., border)	
2000	Asambhav	1, 7, 11		2nd Runner-Up		Best Actor: Bharat Garg^{T}	
1999	Abhimanyu	4, 7		Winner		(Hindi: अभिमन्यु, see Abhimanyu of the Hindu mythology)	
1999	Where There is a Will (English)	4, 10, Tansa					
1999	All for Love (English)	5, 6					
1998	The Dream Theater (English)	2, 3		Winner			
1998	OR (English)	4, 5					
1998	The Artist (English)	6, 7					
1998	Ek Adhura Kalpavriksha	9, 10					
1997	...In Love and War (English)	2, 5					
1997	Nightfall (English)	6, 8		Runner-Up		based on the Isaac Asimov story	
1997	Mrigtrishna (English)	7, 10, Tansa		Winner			
1995	The End	4, 8		Joint Winner			
1995	Harlequin Chevalerie	3, 7		Joint Winner			
1995	The Twilight Zone	1, 9, 11					
1994	Raga Saaga	7, 8					
1994	"Any Dream Will Do"	3, 10		Winner			
1994	The Unforgiven	4, 9					
1993	Locomotivation	3, 9		Winner			
1991	Moonstone	6, 9					
1991	Songs of Distant Earth	2, 7		Winner			
1990	Phantasmagoria	5, 6		Winner			

It has been observed that 2002 was the last time when the team performing first won the PAF.

== See also ==
- Indian Institutes of Technology
- IIT Bombay
