= 7 Letters =

2015 film

- Film poster
- Directed by: Eric Khoo (segment "Cinema"); Boo Junfeng (segment "Parting"); Jack Neo (segment "That Girl"); Kelvin Tong (segment "GPS (Grandma Positioning System)"); K. Rajagopal (segment "The Flame"); Tan Pin Pin (segment "Pineapple Town"); Royston Tan (segment "Bunga Sayang")
- Written by: Eric Khoo; Boo Junfeng; Jack Neo; Ivan Ho; Kelvin Tong; K Rajagopal; Tan Pin Pin; Royston Tan
- Produced by: Karen Khoo-Toohey
- Cinematography: Michael Zaw (segment "GPS (Grandma Positioning System)"); Hideoho Urata (segment "Parting" and "The Flame"); Brian McDairmant (segment "Pineapple Town"); Alan Yap (segment "Bunga Sayang"); Harris Hue (segment "That Girl")
- Edited by: Yim Mun Chong (segment "GPS (Grandma Positioning System)"); Christopher Datugan (segment "GPS (Grandma Positioning System)"); Tammy Quah (segment "Bunga Sayang"); Fran Borgia (segment "The Flame"); Brian Gothong Tan (segment "Cinema")
- Music by: Ricky Ho; Ting Si Hao and Joe Ng (segment "GPS (Grandma Positioning System)"); Matt Kelly (segment "Parting"); Dick Lee (segment "Bunga Sayang")
- Production company: Chuan Pictures
- Distributed by: Golden Village Pictures
- Release date: 24 July 2015
- Running time: 116 minutes
- Country: Singapore
- Languages: Malay; Hokkien; Mandarin; Tamil; English
- Box office: US$$232,027 (Singapore)

7 Letters is a 2015 Singaporean anthology drama film directed by seven different directors. It comprises seven short stories celebrating Singapore's 50th anniversary. The film was selected as the Singaporean entry for the Best Foreign Language Film at the 88th Academy Awards but it was not nominated.

== Cast ==
=== "Cinema" ===
- Nadiah M.Din as The Actress
- David Chua as Fan Fan Law
- Aric Hidir Amin as Slim Villager
- Faizal Abdullah as Round Villager
- Hamidah Jalil as Older Actress
- Lim Poh Huat as Pontianak
- Juliette Binoche as Lady at Cavenagh Bridge (special appearance)

=== "That Girl" ===
- Yan Li Xuan as Caiyun
- Josmen Lum as Ah Shun
- Brien Lee as Ah Fa
- Sebastian Ng as Ah Cai

=== "The Flame" ===
- T. Sasitharan as Father
- Nithiyia Rao as Leela
- N. Vighnesh as Mani
- Fatin Amira as Helper

=== "Bunga Sayang" ===
- Ray Tan Liang Yu as Little Boy
- J. Rosmini as Makcik
- Faith Denning as Teacher

=== "Pineapple Town" ===
- Lydia Look as Ning
- Nickson Cheng as Kang
- Rexy Tong as Michelle (Baby)
- Rianne Lee as Michelle (6 Years Old)
- Anne James as Sumathi
- Yoo Ah Min as Ah Gek
- Karen Lim as Kim Leng
- Rachel Tay as Birth Mum

=== "Parting" ===
- J.A. Halim as Ismail
- Cheryl Tan as Swee Choo
- Khalid Omar as Train Conductor
- Jonathan Sim as Immigration Officer
- Nickson Cheng as Duty Officer
- Desmond Tay Thong Nam as Taxi Driver
- Angel Yeung as Woman on Bus
- Ashmi Roslan as Young Ismail
- Daryl Toh as Flag-day Boy
- Vivian Lim as Shop Assistant

=== "GPS (Grandma Positioning System)" ===
- Zhang Jin Hua as Grandma
- Zheng Geping as Son
- Hong Huifang as Daughter-in-law
- Hazelle Teo as Granddaughter
- Rey Phua as Grandson
- Mok Tye Par as Grandpa

Source :

== Reception ==
Maggie Lee of Variety called the film "uneven but mostly poignant". Joanne Soh of The New Paper rated it 4/5 stars and wrote that it "truly is a passion project that will strike a chord with the older generation". John Lui of My Paper rated it 4.5/5 stars and wrote that the film's quality is good enough to call for a reassessment of assumptions about government-funded art.

Time Out Singapore selected it as the best Singaporean film of 2015.

== Controversy ==
In January 2016, the film was flagged by Malaysian censors before it was due to screen at the Titian Budaya Festival. A successful appeal was made by the organiser, CultureLink, against the cuts for the vulgar phrase in Cantonese, "curse your whole family", in Jack Neo’s segment of the omnibus.

== See also ==
- List of submissions to the 88th Academy Awards for Best Foreign Language Film
- List of Singaporean submissions for the Academy Award for Best Foreign Language Film
