= K. Rajagopal (director) =

Singaporean film director

- Born: Singapore
- Occupation(s): Film director, screenwriter
- Years active: 1995–present

K. Rajagopal is a Singaporean film director and screenwriter. He co-wrote and directed the social drama film A Yellow Bird, which was selected to be screened in the Critics' Week section at the 2016 Cannes Film Festival.

== Career ==
Before he found filmmaking, he worked in the hotel industry and was also teaching in a school for mentally-challenged people. His entry into filmmaking is a direct result of being a "frustrated actor" in the theatre world who was unable to get lead roles as a result of being a minority race in Singapore.

Besides filmmaking, he has also worked onstage and collaborated with many notable theatre directors on projects such as Medea, Mother Courage, and Beauty World. He performed as King Lear in The King Lear Project at the Kunstenfestivaldesarts in Brussels, and at the Singapore Arts Festival in 2008, after an 11-year hiatus. In 2009, he played Faust in Film Faust for the Esplanade Presents Series.

== Filmography ==
Year	Title	Director	Screenwriter	Awards	Notes						
Year	Title	Director	Screenwriter	Awards	Notes	1995	I Can't Sleep Tonight	Yes	Yes	Special Jury Prize Singapore International Film Festival	Short film
1996	The Glare	Yes	Yes	Special Jury Prize Singapore International Film Festival	Short film						
1997	Absence	Yes	Yes	Special Jury Prize Singapore International Film Festival	Short film						
1999	Brother	Yes	Yes		Short film						
2008	Lucky 7	Yes	Yes		Anthology film						
2008	The New World	Yes	Yes		Short film						
2010	Timeless	Yes	Yes		Short film						
2015	7 Letters	Yes	Yes	"The Flame"	Anthology film						
2015	Heartland	Yes	No		Telemovie						
2016	A Yellow Bird	Yes	Yes		Feature film						
2016	The Day I Lost My Shadow	Yes	Yes		Short film						
2017	Sanjay	Yes	Yes		Short film						
2017	Song of the Waves	Yes	Yes		Short film						
2017	Lizard on the Wall	Yes	Yes		Feature film						
2019	A Dream I Did Not Dream	Yes	Yes		Short film						
2021	Sleep With Me	Yes	Yes		Limited Series						
2023	Under My Skin	Yes	No		Limited Series						
