= Tzang Merwyn Tong =

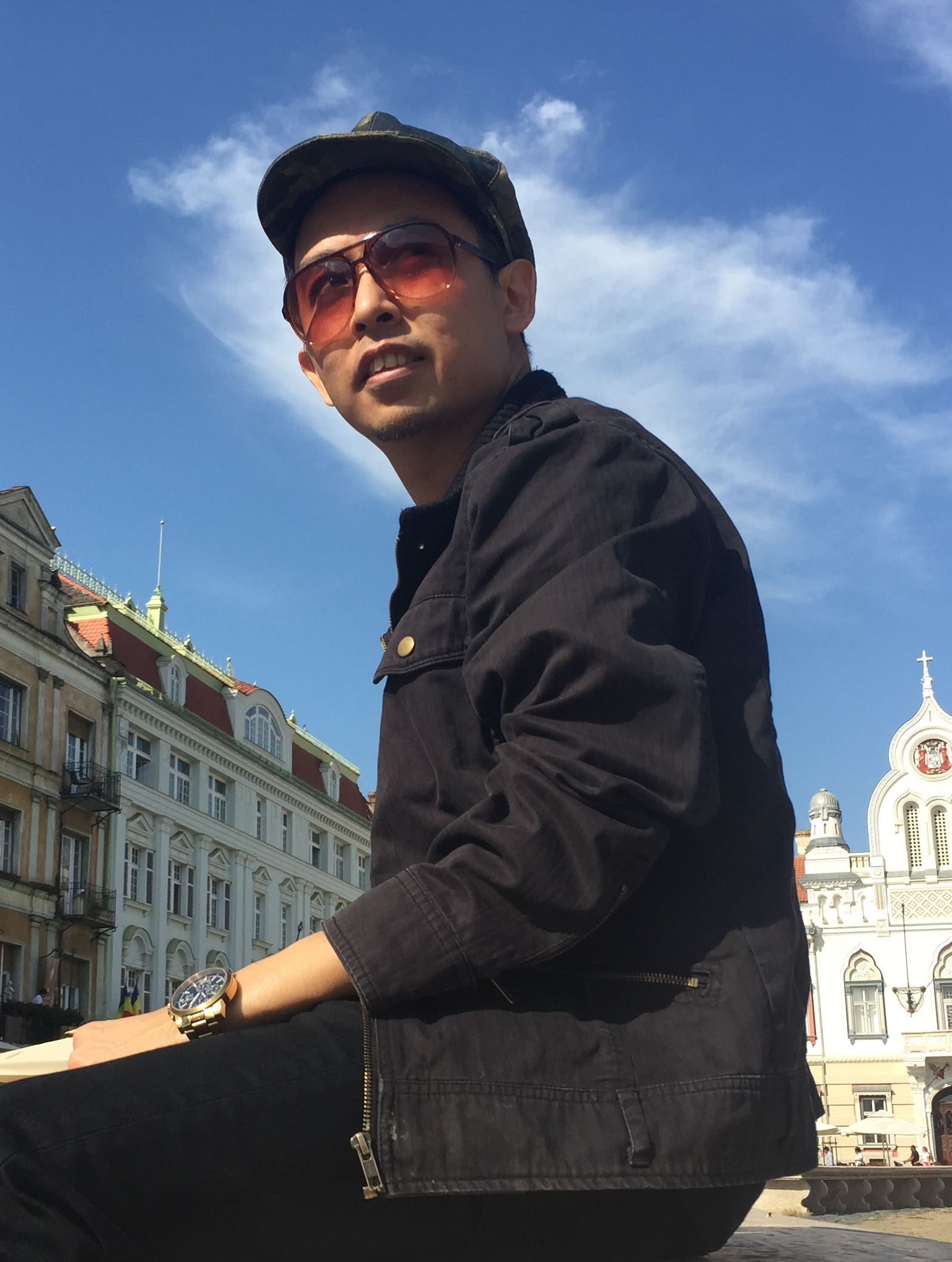
- Born: October 31, 1979 (age 46); Singapore

Tzang Merwyn Tong (唐荣均; born 31 October 1979) is an independent filmmaker, screenwriter, educator and researcher from Singapore, known for his offbeat underground films set in surreal worlds, often incorporating elements of fairy tale and comic fantasy. His notable films include e'Tzaintes (2003), A Wicked Tale (2005), and V1k1 - A Techno Fairytale (2010), and Faeryville (2015), Singapore's first dystopian teen movie which made its world premiere in Los Angeles.

His other works have won critical acclaim at film festivals in Berlin, Montreal, Rotterdam, Munich and Tel Aviv. F*** magazine calls Tong a "maverick director", with Twitch Film hailing him as a "Singapore filmmaker standing out from the rest of the pack".

In 2024, Tong served as a jury member for the Short Film Competition at the 7th Hanoi International Film Festival in Vietnam. He was named by South China Morning Post in 2025 as one of five directors reshaping Asian Cinema, alongside Jia Zhangke, Tony Bui and Ray Yeung.

Tong is also the founder of Zen-Mind Filmmaking, a minimalist and mindfulness-based approach to filmmaking informed by principles of Zen philosophy.

== Education ==
Tong graduated from Ngee Ann Polytechnic's School of Film and Media Studies in 1999 with a Diploma in Mass Communication. He later obtained a degree in Mass Communications from Curtin University in Western Australia.

In 2022, he completed a Master of Arts in Arts Pedagogy and Practice from Goldsmiths, University of London, through LASALLE College of the Arts. His research on Zen-Mind Filmmaking has been presented at Glasgow School of Art's On Not Knowing: How Artists Teach conference.

== Biography ==
At 19 years old, with no prior knowledge in filmmaking, Tong made his debut film e'Tzaintes, a no-budget teenage black comedy about social misfits who band together to stand up against oppression. The film was made guerrilla style, under tight budget constraints, with no professional actors. The film was selected for the opening night at the Berlin Asia Pacific Film Festival in 2004.

Soon after e'Tzaintes was released, Tong embarked on his second film, A Wicked Tale, a psycho-erotic thriller based on the Little Red Riding Hood fable. The film made its world premiere at the 34th Rotterdam International Film Festival. A Wicked Tale went on to festivals in Berlin, Munich, Frankfurt, Tel Aviv, Melbourne, Montreal, Lund, Leeds and Florida, receiving rave reviews as the sold-out Closing Night film of the Montreal FanTasia Festival. It was described by Montreal Mirror as a "hallicinatory atmospheric film drenched in lust and dread". The film was released on VCD and DVDs with 1,000 DVDs released and sold out.

Plans for a new feature film began, but it took him 7 years to raise enough money to make it. The film was code named The FRVL Project.

In 2010, Tong collaborated with a local Institute of Technical Education on a short film, a SciFi/Fantasy titled V1K1 – A Techno Fairytale. The film sees him working with a student crew from the school of Digital Audio Video Production, featuring music by Amanda Ling (formerly of Electrico). V1K1 is a homage to 70s Sci Fi movies, that favour wildly imaginative storytelling over an emphasis of special effects. The film is described as a "Techno-Fairy Riff on Shakespeare's A Midsummer Night's Dream", telling a story of a human scientist dead set on proving the existence of fairies. The film premiered at the 2nd Singapore Short Film Awards and is the winner of the Gold Remi Award in the Fantasy/Sci Fi category at the 2011 WorldFest in Houston, USA.

News that Tong was working on a feature film Faeryville surfaced in The Business Times of Singapore in August 2012. The film was previously code-named The FRVL Project. Faeryville is described as "Fight Club meets (Baz Luhrmann's) Romeo + Juliet, set in a fictitious college that mirrors our increasingly surreal world". Faeryville took Tong 8 years to complete, largely due to its controversial themes involving college shootings and youth bullying.

In 2015, Faeryville made its red carpet World Premiere to rousing reception at the Downtown Independent Theatre in Los Angeles, with the LA audiences applauding it as a 'zeitgeist film'. In April 2015, Faeryville was given a pass with an M18 rating by the Media Development Authority of Singapore to have a limited theatrical run in Singapore. Tickets to the Singapore Gala Premiere was sold out on the same day it went on sale. Mothership.SG describes Faeryville as "unorthodox and inventive…flying the flag of alternative cinema in Singapore."

With Faeryville as a cultural talking point, Tong became an ambassador to raise awareness for Coalition Against Bullying for Children and Youth in Singapore.

== Filmography ==
1. Faeryville(2015) (director / writer / producer)
2. V1K1 – A Techno Fairytale (2011) (director / writer)
3. A Wicked Tale (2005) (director / writer / producer)
4. e'Tzaintes (2003) (director / writer / producer)
