= 2024 QCinema International Film Festival =

Filipino film festival

- Opening film: Director's Factory Philippines
- Closing film: Cloud by Kiyoshi Kurosawa
- Location: Quezon City, Philippines
- Festival date: November 8–17, 2024
- Website: qcinema.ph

QCinema International Film Festival
- 2025 2023

The 12th QCinema International Film Festival took place from November 8 to 17, 2024 in Quezon City, Philippines. A total of 77 films were screened during the festival. The festival opened with the anthology project Director's Factory Philippines, held by Directors' Fortnight section at the 2024 Cannes Film Festival. The initiative paired eight filmmakers from the Philippines and other neighboring countries to produce four short films. It closed with Kiyoshi Kurosawa's psychological thriller film Cloud.

== Official selection ==
=== Asian New Wave ===
English title	Original title	Director(s)	Production countrie(s)
Don't Cry, Butterfly	Mưa trên cánh bướm	Dương Diệu Linh	Vietnam, Indonesia, Philippines, Singapore
Happyend		Neo Sora	Japan, United States
Mistress Dispeller		Elizabeth Lo	China, United States
Moneyslapper		Bor Ocampo	Philippines
Pierce	刺心切骨	Nelicia Low	Singapore, Taiwan, Poland
Tale of the Land		Loeloe Hendra	Indonesia, Philippines, Qatar, Taiwan
Việt and Nam	Trong lòng đất	Minh Quý Trương	Vietnam, Philippines, Singapore, France, Netherlands, Italy, Germany, United States

=== New Horizons ===
English title	Original title	Director(s)	Production countrie(s)
Blue Sun Palace		Constance Tsang	United States
Cu Li Never Cries	Cu Li Không Bao Giờ Khóc	Phạm Ngọc Lân	Vietnam, France, Norway, Philippines, Singapore
The Major Tones	Los tonos mayores	Ingrid Pokropek	Argentina, Spain
Santosh		Sandhya Suri	United Kingdom, India, Germany, France
Toxic	Akiplėša	Saulė Bliuvaitė	Lithuania

=== RainbowQC ===
English title	Original title	Director(s)	Production countrie(s)
Baby		Marcelo Caetano	Brazil, France, Netherlands
The Balconettes	Les Femmes au balcon	Noémie Merlant	France
My Sunshine	ぼくのお日さま	Hiroshi Okuyama	Japan
Pooja, Sir		Deepak Rauniyar	Nepal, Norway, United States
Sebastian		Mikko Mäkelä	Finland, United Kingdom, Belgium, France

=== Special Screenings ===
English title	Original title	Director(s)	Production countrie(s)
A Thousand Forests		Hanz Florentino	Philippines
An Errand		Dominic Baekart	Philippines
If My Lover Were a Flower		Kaung Zan	Myanmar
Lost Sabungeros		Bryan Brazil	Philippines

=== QCinema Selects ===
English title	Original title	Director(s)	Production countrie(s)
Ghost Cat Anzu	化け猫あんずちゃん	Yōko Kuno, Nobuhiro Yamashita	France, Japan
No Other Land	لا أرض أخرى	Basel Adra, Hamdan Ballal, Yuval Abraham, Rachel Szor	Palestine, Norway
Shahid		Narges Kalhor	Germany
The Sparrow in the Chimney	Der Spatz im Kamin	Ramon Zürcher	Switzerland
Sujo		Astrid Rondero, Fernanda Valadez	Mexico, United States, France
Twilight of the Warriors: Walled In	九龍城寨之圍城	Soi Cheang	Hong Kong

=== Screen International ===
English title	Original title	Director(s)	Production countrie(s)
Afternoons of Solitude	Tardes de soledad	Albert Serra	Spain, France, Portugal
All We Imagine as Light	പ്രഭയായ് നിനച്ചതെല്ലാം	Payal Kapadia	France, India, Italy, Luxembourg, Netherlands
Anora		Sean Baker	United States
The Count of Monte Cristo	Le Comte de Monte-Cristo	Matthieu Delaporte, Alexandre de La Patellière	France
The End		Joshua Oppenheimer	Denmark, Finland, Germany, Ireland, Italy, Sweden, United Kingdom, United States
Grand Tour		Miguel Gomes	Portugal, China, France, Germany, Italy, Japan
Phantosmia		Lav Diaz	Philippines
The Room Next Door	La habitación de al lado	Pedro Almodóvar	Spain
Simon of the Mountain	Simón de la montaña	Federico Luis	Argentina, China, Mexico, Uruguay
When Fall Is Coming	Quand vient l'automne	François Ozon	France

=== Before Midnight ===
English title	Original title	Director(s)	Production countrie(s)
A Samurai in Time	侍タイムスリッパー	Junichi Yasuda	Japan
Gazer		Ryan J. Sloan	United States
Infinite Summer	Igavene suvi	Miguel Llansó	Estonia, Spain, United States
Motel Destino		Karim Aïnouz	Brazil, France, Germany
The Wailing	El llanto	Pedro Martín-Calero	Spain, Argentina, France

=== Contemporary Italian Cinema ===
English title	Original title	Director(s)	Production countrie(s)
Diabolik		Manetti Bros.	Italy
Io capitano		Matteo Garrone	Italy, Belgium, France
Kidnapped	Rapito	Marco Bellocchio	Italy, France, Germany
La chimera		Alice Rohrwacher	Italy, France, Switzerland, Turkey
My Summer with Irène	Quell'estate con Irène	Carlo Sironi	Italy, France
Palazzina Laf		Michele Riondino	Italy, France

== Awards ==
The following awards were presented at the festival:

=== Asian Next Wave ===
- Best Picture: Việt and Nam by Minh Quý Trương
- Grand Jury Prize: Don't Cry, Butterfly by Dương Diệu Linh
- Best Director: Elizabeth Lo for Mistress Dispeller
- Best Lead Performance: John Lloyd Cruz for Moneyslapper and Shenina Cinnamon for Tale of the Land
- Best Screenplay: Neo Sora for Happyend
- Artistic Achievement Award for Production Design: Marcus Cheng and Hsu Kuei-Ting for Pierce

=== New Horizons ===
- Best First Film: Toxic by Saulė Bliuvaitė
- NETPAC Jury Prize for Best Asian First Film: Cu Li Never Cries by Phạm Ngọc Lân

=== RainbowQC ===
- Best LGBTQ Film: Sebastian by Mikko Mäkelä and Baby by Marcelo Caetano
- Special Mention: My Sunshine by Hiroshi Okuyama

=== QCShorts International ===
- Best Short Film: What Did the Sky Tell You, Celso? by Gilb Baldoza
- Special Mention: Are We Still Friends? by Al Ridwan
- Jury Prize: Washhh by Mickey Lai
- Gender Sensitivity Award: Rampage! (O Ang Parada) by Kukay Bautista Zinampan
- Critics Lab Young Critics Prize: What Did the Sky Tell You, Celso? by Gilb Baldoza and Here We Are by Chanasorn Chaikitiporn
