= Volos Films =

Film production company

- Founded: 2018
- Founder: Stefano Centini
- Headquarters: Tapei, Taiwan; Rome, Italy

Volos Films is a film production company founded by film producer Stefano Centini, headquartered in Taiwan and Italy. Its output includes noteworthy film such as A Holy Family, which won the Grand Prize at the Taipei Film Festival, and The Settlers, which competed at Cannes Film Festival and received the FIPRESCI Prize.

== Overview ==
Volos Films was founded in 2018 in Taiwan, with a focus on facilitating international co-productions between Europe and Asia. The company operates through two branches: Volos Films Taiwan and Volos Films Italia, the latter established in 2022. Several of its productions, including A Holy Family and Tomorrow is a Long Time, have received international co-production support from the Taiwan Creative Content Agency (TAICCA).

In 2023, Volos Films announced further projects in development in collaboration with EpicMedia Productions and producer Huang Junxiang. These include Molder, a feature film directed by Kenneth Dagatan, and Hold My Gaze, a mystery thriller directed by Carlo Catu.

In 2024, Volos Films announced its first Japanese co-production, Polaris, as well as a slate of international projects in development. These include I Have to Fuck Before the World Ends, Molder, Impunity, and Death Has No Master.

In the same year, Volos Films began developing scripted television projects, presenting its first drama and series slate at the Taiwan Creative Content Fest (TCCF). Among its early series projects is The Fundamentals, a supernatural thriller created by Singaporean director Yeo Siew-Hua and co-produced with Singapore-based Akanga. The project was selected for the Series Mania Institute’s Serial Bridges Asia programme and features an all-Taiwanese cast.

The company has also developed Never the Bride, a comedy-drama series created by Liza Diño-Seguerra and set within the Filipino luxury wedding industry. The series is co-produced with France's Ghost City Films and is set across the Philippines, Taiwan, and France. In addition, Volos Films has developed drama projects through its Italian division, including Hallyu, which was selected for the Series Mania Institute’s Apollo programme.

== Filmography ==
- Ten Years Taiwan (2018)
- A Holy Family (2022)
- Divine Factory (2022)
- In My Mother's Skin (2022)
- Tomorrow is a Long Time (2023)
- The Settlers (2023)
- Essential Truths of the Lake (2023)
- The Human Surge 3 (2023)
- Familiar (2023)
- An Afternoon with Berti (2023)
- Viet and Nam (2024)
- Transamazonia (2024)
- Wishing on a Star (2024)
- Stranger Eyes (2024)
- Another Home (2024)
- Some Nights I Feel Like Walking (2024)
- I, the Song (2024)
- Heads or Tails (2025)
- Magellan (2025)
