= Stefano Centini =

Italian film producer

- Chinese: 陳璽文
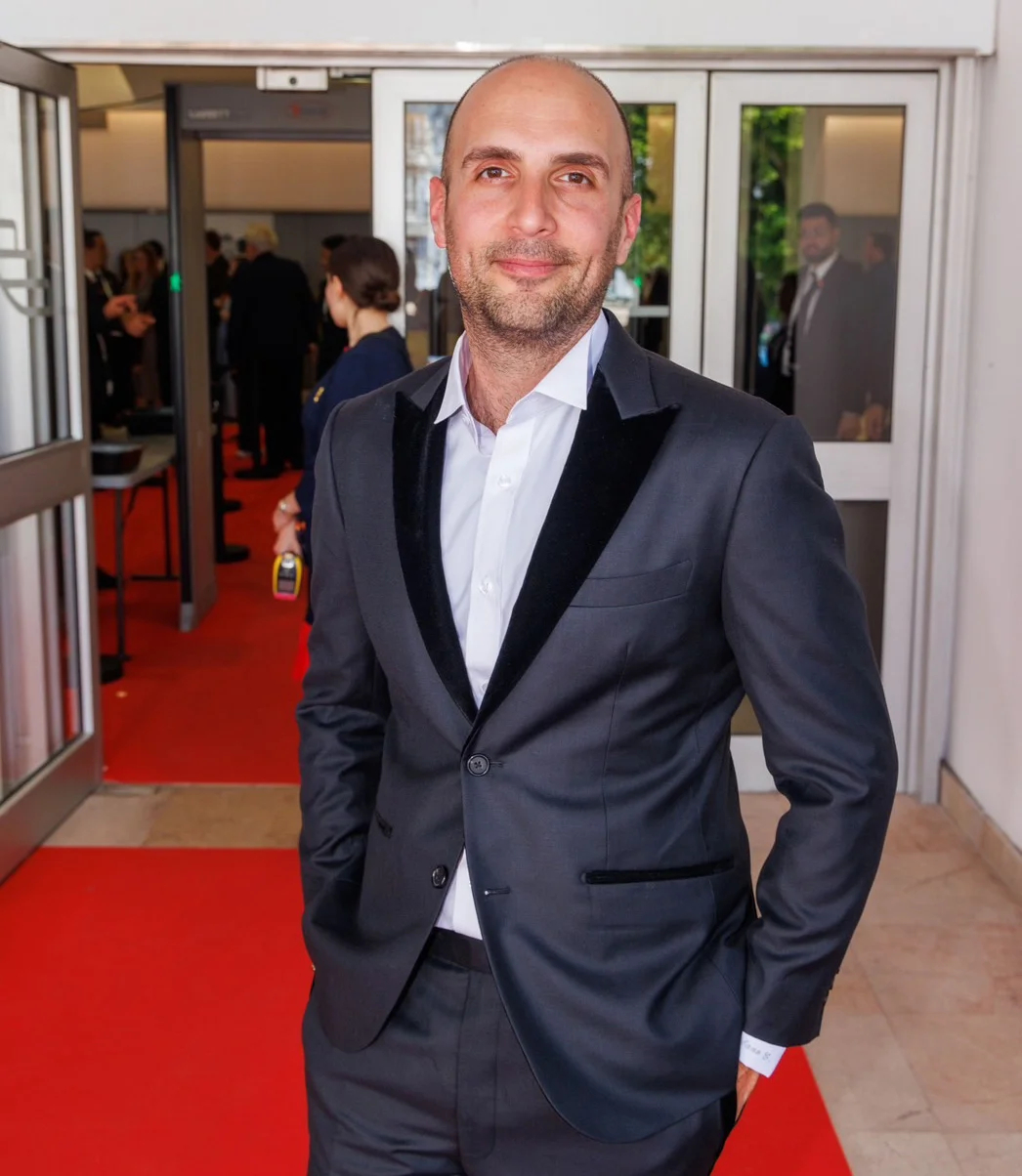
- Born: Rome, Italy
- Other name: Chen Xiwen
- Occupation: Film producer
- Years active: 2005–present

Stefano Centini is an Italian-Taiwanese film producer. He is the founder of production company Volos Films, focused on producing cross-continental co-productions between Asia and Europe.

== Life and education ==
Centini was born and raised in Rome, Italy. He obtained a postgraduate master's degree in Creative Producing at the Centro Sperimentale di Cinematografia in Lombardy, a master's degree in Chinese Language and Culture from Institut National des Langues et Civilisations Orientales (INALCO) in Paris, and a Master's in Television and Film Production from the National Taiwan University of Arts. In 2020, he was granted Taiwanese citizenship due to his contribution to the Taiwanese cinema.

== Career ==
Centini began his career as a documentary director, working with broadcasters such as Discovery Channel, National Geographic, and AETN. In 2016, he produced Absent Without Leave, which screened at Busan International Film Festival, Taipei Film Festival and won the Audience Choice Award at the Singapore International Film Festival 2016.

In 2018, Centini founded Volos Films, a Taiwan-based production company aimed at facilitating international co-productions between Europe and Asia. Same year, he produced Ket Huat Lau's segment of Ten Years Taiwan that was presented at Taipei Film Festival.

In 2020, Centini signed a memorandum of understanding committing to produce around 20 international co-production projects, including films and documentaries, over three years, supported by funding opportunities introduced through the Taiwan Creative Content Agency (Taicca).

In early 2022, Centini's directed and produced Secrets of the Ocean Tribes for National Geographic was launched. The series, which was hosted by Julian Davison and indigenous artist Yosifu, focused on the Autronesian migration and Taiwan's indigenous culture connection with the Pacific Islands. It went on to win three 57th Golden Bell Awards and won Taiwan’s Best Documentary at the Asian Academy Creative Awards. Later that year, he produced documentary features such as A Holy Family which premiered at Visions du Réel International Competition and won four awards including Grand Prize and Audience Award at the Taipei Film Festival 2022, and Divine Factory which had its world premiere at DOK Leipzig 2022. In the same year, he participated as a mentor in the inaugural Taiwan Pitch, an international documentary talent development program inviting creators from Taiwan and abroad to make films about Taiwan.

In Feb 2023, Centini produced folk horror In My Mother's Skin which premiered at the 2023 Sundance Film Festival as part of the festival's "Midnight" section. Same month, he produced Tomorrow Is a Long Time, a Singapore-Taiwanese-French-Portuguese co-production that premiered as part of the Generation 14plus selection of the 73rd Berlin International Film Festival. In May 2023, he co-produced revisionist Western drama The Settlers (2023 film) that premiered at the 76th Cannes Film Festival and was honoured with FIPRESCI Prize, becoming the first Chilean production to win that award.

In 2024, Centini co-produced romantic drama Viet and Nam which had its world premiere in the Un Certain Regard section of the 2024 Cannes Film Festival, where it was nominated for the Queer Palm. In the same year, he produced three films that premiered at the Venice Film Festival including documentary Wishing on a Star, mystery thriller film Stranger Eyes, and VR animated film Guardians of the Jade Mountain. Later that year, he produced coming of age film Transamazonia and two films that premiered at Tallinn Black Nights Film Festival; road-trip drama Some Nights I Feel Like Walking and psychological mystery I, the Song.

In May 2025, Centini produced Heads or Tail?, presented in the Un Certain Regard section of the 78th Cannes Film Festival, as well Magellan, presented in the Cannes Premiere section.

In 2026, Centini produced Palimpsest: The Story of a Name, directed by Mary Stephen. The documentary premiered at the 62nd Taipei Golden Horse Film Festival, where it won Best Film Editing and Best Documentary Feature.

=== Dispute with Taiwan Creative Content Agency ===
In 2023, Centini criticized changes at the Taiwan Creative Content Agency (Taicca), including the suspension of the International Co-Funding Program (TICP) and a shift toward higher-budget television projects. He and about 100 other industry professionals signed a statement expressing concern over transparency and reduced support for independent productions; subsequent disputes included limited travel funding for Stranger Eyes, absence of Taicca officials at Transamazonia premiere, and the agency’s public disclosure of Volos Films’ past funding, which Centini considered inappropriate.

== Filmography ==
=== As producer ===
- Nia's Door (short) (2015)
- Absent Without Leave (2016)
- Ten Years Taiwan (2018)
- A Holy Family (2022)
- Divine Factory (2022)
- In My Mother's Skin (2022)
- Tomorrow is a Long Time (2023)
- The Settlers (2023)
- Essential Truths of the Lake (2023)
- The Human Surge 3 (2023)
- Familiar (2023)
- An Afternoon with Berti (2023)
- Viet and Nam (2024)
- Transamazonia (2024)
- Wishing on a Star (2024)
- Stranger Eyes (2024)
- Another Home (2024)
- Some Nights I Feel Like Walking (2024)
- I, the Song (2024)
- Heads or Tails (2025)
- Magellan (2025)
- Palimpsest: The Story of a Name (2026)
