= 2025 QCinema International Film Festival =

2025 film festival

- Opening film: Couture by Alice Winocour
- Location: Quezon City, Philippines
- Festival date: November 14–23, 2025
- Website: qcinema.ph

QCinema International Film Festival
- 2026 2024

The 2025 QCinema International Film Festival took place from November 14 to 23, 2025 in Quezon City, Philippines. It highlights the theme of "Film City", which celebrates Quezon City's recognition as UNESCO's City of Film this year. The festival opened with Alice Winocour's drama film Couture and closed with Ratchapoom Boonbunchachoke's supernatural comedy film A Useful Ghost, the winner of Asian Next Wave Best Picture.

== Juries ==
=== Asian Next Wave ===
- Bianca Balbuena, film producer
- Liz Shackleton, film journalist
- Martin Horyna, film festival programmer
- John Arcilla, actor

=== QCShorts International ===
- Chris Fujiwara, writer and film critic
- Mikhail Red, filmmaker
- Pearl Chan, film distributor

=== RainbowQC ===
- Petersen Vargas, filmmaker
- Don Jaucian, author
- Francisco Javier López Tapia, director of Instituto Cervantes of Manila

=== New Horizons ===
- Bastian Meiresonne, author
- Martika Ramirez Escobar, filmmaker
- Panos Kotzathanasis, film critic

== Official selection ==
=== Asian Next Wave ===
English title	Original title	Director(s)	Production countrie(s)
Diamonds in the Sand	砂の中のダイヤモンド	Janus Victoria	Japan, Malaysia, Philippines
Family Matters	我家的事	Ke-yin Pan	Taiwan
Ky Nam Inn	Quán Kỳ Nam	Leon Le	Vietnam
Lost Land	Harà Watan	Akio Fujimoto	Japan, France, Malaysia, Germany
Luz	花明渡	Flora Lau	Hong Kong, China, France
Open Endings		Nigel Santos	Philippines
Renoir		Chie Hayakawa	Japan, France, Philippines, Singapore, Indonesia
A Useful Ghost	ผีใช้ได้ค่ะ	Ratchapoom Boonbunchachoke	Thailand, France, Singapore, Germany
The World of Love	세계의 주인	Yoon Ga-eun	South Korea

=== New Horizons ===
English title	Original title	Director(s)	Production countrie(s)
Amoeba		Tan Siyou	Singapore, Netherlands, Spain, France, South Korea
Blue Heron		Sophy Romvari	Canada, Hungary, United States
Brand New Landscape	見はらし世代	Yuiga Danzuka	Japan
The Chronology of Water		Kristen Stewart	United States, Latvia, France
DJ Ahmet	Диџеј Ахмет	Georgi M. Unkovski	North Macedonia, Czechia, Serbia, Croatia
Lucky Lu		Lloyd Lee Choi	Canada, United States
Manas		Marianna Brennand Fortes	Brazil, Portugal, France, Belgium
On Your Lap	Pangku	Reza Rahadian	Indonesia, Saudi Arabia
The President's Cake	مملكة القصب	Hasan Hadi	Iraq, United States, Qatar

=== RainbowQC ===
English title	Original title	Director(s)	Production countrie(s)
3670		Park Joon-ho	South Korea
Bel Ami	漂亮朋友	Geng Jun	France
The Little Sister	La Petite Dernière	Hafsia Herzi	France, Germany
The Mysterious Gaze of the Flamingo	La misteriosa mirada del flamenco	Diego Céspedes	Chile, France, Spain, Belgium, Germany
On the Road	En el camino	David Pablos	Mexico
Skin of Youth	Ồn ào tuổi trẻ	Ash Mayfair	Vietnam, Singapore, United States, Japan
Strange River	Estrany Riu	Jaume Claret Muxart	Spain, Germany
Summer's Camera	여름의 카메라	Divine Sung	South Korea

=== Screen International ===
English title	Original title	Director(s)	Production countrie(s)
Couture (opening film)		Alice Winocour	United States, France
Divine Comedy	کمدی الهی	Ali Asgari	Iran, Italy, France, Germany, Turkey
Father Mother Sister Brother		Jim Jarmusch	United States, Ireland, France, Italy, Japan
Hamnet		Chloé Zhao	United Kingdom, United States
The History of Sound		Oliver Hermanus	United Kingdom, United States, Sweden
Little Amélie or the Character of Rain	Amélie et la métaphysique des tubes	Maïlys Vallade, Liane-Cho Han	France, Belgium
The Mastermind		Kelly Reichardt	United Kingdom, United States
Once Upon a Time in Gaza		Tarzan and Arab Nasser	France, Portugal, Palestine, Germany, United States
The Portuguese House	Una quinta portuguesa	Avelina Prat	Spain, Portugal
Sirāt		Óliver Laxe	Spain, France, Morocco
The Things You Kill	Öldürdüğün Şeyler	Alireza Khatami	Canada, France, Poland, Turkey, Singapore

=== Before Midnight ===
English title	Original title	Director(s)	Production countrie(s)
The Garden of Earthly Delights	Ang Hardin ng Makalupang Kasiyahan	Morgan Knibbe	Netherlands, Philippines, Belgium
Rabbit Trap		Bryn Chainey	United States, United Kingdom
The Ugly Stepsister	Den Stygge Stesøsteren	Emilie Blichfeldt	Denmark, Norway, Poland, Sweden

=== QCinema Selects ===
The first two episodes of HBO Max's comedy series Call My Manager were screened during the festival.

English title	Original title	Director(s)	Production countrie(s)
Call My Manager (episodes 1 and 2)		Erik Matti	Philippines
Human Resource		Nawapol Thamrongrattanarit	Thailand
The Kings of the World	Los reyes del mundo	Laura Mora	Colombia, France, Luxembourg, Mexico, Norway
Lakambini, Gregoria De Jesus		Arjanmar Rebeta, Jeffrey Jeturian	Philippines
Rental Family		Hikari	United States
The Richest Woman in the World	La femme la plus riche du monde	Thierry Klifa	France, Belgium
Shadow Transit		Pedring Lopez	Philippines, Hong Kong, Canada

=== Rediscovery ===
2000 film Almost Famous was set to screen at the festival, but cancelled due to technical issues.

English title	Original title	Director(s)	Production countrie(s)
Linda Linda Linda (2005)	リンダ リンダ リンダ	Nobuhiro Yamashita	Japan
Showgirls (1995)		Paul Verhoeven	United States, France

=== Dokyu Days ===
English title	Original title	Director(s)	Production countrie(s)
10s Across the Borders		Chan Sze-wei	Philippines, Singapore, Germany, United Kingdom
2000 Meters to Andriivka	2000 метрів до Андріївки	Mstyslav Chernov	Ukraine, United States
Below the Clouds	Sotto le nuvole	Gianfranco Rosi	Italy
The Road to Sydney		Benito Bautista	Philippines
The Treasure Hunter		Giacomo Gex	United States, Philippines
The Voice of Hind Rajab	صوت هند رجب	Kaouther Ben Hania	France, Tunisia, United States, United Kingdom, Cyprus, Saudi Arabia, Italy

=== Focus on Sandra Hüller ===
This year's special program is focused to showcase the work by German actress Sandra Hüller, presented with Goethe-Institut.

English title	Original title	Director(s)	Production countrie(s)
Anatomy of a Fall (2023)	Anatomie d'une chute	Justine Triet	France
Requiem (2006)		Hans-Christian Schmid	Germany
Toni Erdmann (2016)		Maren Ade	Austria, France, Germany, Romania
Two to One (2024)	Zwei zu eins	Natja Brunckhorst	Germany
The Zone of Interest (2023)		Jonathan Glazer	United Kingdom, Poland, United States

== Awards ==
The following awards were presented at the festival:

=== Asian New Wave ===
- Best Picture: A Useful Ghost by Ratchapoom Boonbunchachoke
- Jury Prize: Lost Land by Akio Fujimoto
- Best Director: Chie Hayakawa for Renoir
- Best Lead Performance: Yui Suzuki for Renoir
- Best Screenplay: Janus Victoria for Diamonds in the Sand
- Artistic Achievement Award for Production Design: Rasiguet Sookkarn for A Useful Ghost

=== New Horizons ===
- Best Film: Amoeba by Siyou Tan
- Jury Prize: Blue Heron by Sophy Romvari
- NETPAC Jury Prize for Best Asian First Film: On Your Lap by Reza Rahadian

=== RainbowQC ===
- Best LGBT Film: The Mysterious Gaze of the Flamingo by Diego Céspedes
- Jury Prize: Strange River by Jaume Claret Muxart
- Special Mention: Summer's Camera by Divine Sung

=== QCShorts ===
- Best Short Film: Honey, My Love, So Sweet by JT Trinidad
- Jury Prize: A Metamorphosis by Lin Htet Aung
- Best Short Film – QCShorts Lokal: Surface Tension by the Serrano Sisters
- Gender Sensitivity Award: Kara: The Burning Woman by Dale
- Special Mention: Little Rebels Cinema Club by Khozy Rizal
- Critics Prize: Kara: The Burning Woman by Dale and Hoy, Hoy, Ingat! by Norvin de los Santos
