= A Useful Ghost =

2025 film by Ratchapoom Boonbunchachoke

- Thai theatrical release poster
- Thai: ผีใช้ได้ค่ะ
- Directed by: Ratchapoom Boonbunchachoke
- Written by: Ratchapoom Boonbunchachoke
- Produced by: Cattleya Paosrijaroen; Soros Sukhum
- Starring: Davika Hoorne; Witsarut Himmarat; Apasiri Nitibhon; Wanlop Rungkumjud; Wisarut Homhuan
- Cinematography: Pasit Tandaechanurat
- Edited by: Chonlasit Upanigkit
- Music by: Chaibovon Seelukwa
- Production companies: 185 Films; Haut Les Mains; Momo Films; Mayana Films; N8
- Distributed by: GDH 559 (Thailand)
- Release dates: 17 May 2025 (Cannes); 28 August 2025 (Thailand)
- Running time: 130 minutes
- Countries: Thailand; France; Singapore; Germany
- Languages: Thai; English; Isan

A Useful Ghost (Thai: ผีใช้ได้ค่ะ, romanized: Phi Chaidai Kha) is a 2025 supernatural black comedy-drama film directed and written by Ratchapoom Boonbunchachoke, in his directorial debut. It stars Davika Hoorne, Witsarut Himmarat, Apasiri Nitibhon, Wanlop Rungkumjad, and Wisarut Homhuan. The film is a co-production of Thailand, France, Singapore, and Germany.

The film had its world premiere at the Critics' Week section of the 2025 Cannes Film Festival on 17 May, where it won the Grand Prize. It was theatrically released in Thailand on 28 August by GDH 559.

It was selected as the Thai entry for Best International Feature Film at the 98th Academy Awards, but it was disqualified.

Boonbunchachoke has voiced his hope that the film would spark political debates in his home country. Written as an indirect metaphor for the political environment of Thailand following the 2014 Thai coup d'état, the film explicitly references the 2010 massacres carried out by the Democrat Party-led government of Abhisit Vejjajiva. Furthermore, the movie was made to shine a spotlight on the conditional acceptance of queer people in Thailand and the pressing issue of air pollution in Bangkok.

== Plot ==
A self-described "academic ladyboy" is overwhelmed by the dust stirred up by his city's renewal projects and purchases a vacuum cleaner to tidy his apartment. At night he overhears his new vacuum coughing, and in the morning finds that it has expelled the dust it had cleaned. The Ladyboy calls for a repairman, who arrives almost instantly. The repairman, Krong, tells him that the vacuum is physically fine but haunted by a ghost, and that many ghosts haunted the factory that produced it. Smitten with the handsome Krong, the Ladyboy allows him to tell the tale of the haunted factory.

Suman, the heir of her late husband's electronics factory, is troubled by the vengeful spirit of Tok, an employee who died on the factory floor after hours of coughing up blood, which Suman's experts later diagnose as "congenital heart disease". Tok blames the factory for having catalyzed his death and interrupts work by possessing machinery and angrily complaining. Tok is anchored to the physical world because someone close to him remembers his life. Tok's haunting causes Suman to lose her license to operate the factory and forces it to close.

March, the younger of Suman's two sons, is mourning the recent loss of his wife Nat and their unborn child to respiratory disease. While attending an investigation into Tok's haunting of the factory, March sees the spirit of Nat walking into an inventory warehouse and follows her. Nat possess a vacuum cleaner and seduces March. His family and religious authorities are disturbed to discover the young man sexually engaging with an appliance and March is taken to a hospital.

Nat, still in the vacuum cleaner, travels to the hospital to visit March. On the way, she befriends the Prime Minister of Thailand, Dr. Paul, by cleaning the dust irritating his eyes. March now sees Nat as a human, and the two happily reunite in his room. Nat remains with March for the duration of his stay, to the distress of Suman and his other older relatives. The two lovers discuss restarting their family using Nat's frozen eggs.

Under pressure from her conservative in-laws, who never liked Nat, Suman unsuccessfully attempts to end the relationship by having Buddhist monks exorcise the vacuum and by having the police confiscate the "stolen" vacuum. Dr. Paul intervenes, citing Nat as a "good ghost" who should be supported. Frustrated, Suman has March committed to a psychiatric institution where he receives electroshock therapy designed to damage his memory; if he forgets Nat, her bond to the physical world will be severed and she will disappear.

Nat still manages to see March by entering his dreams, but as the therapy continues her form begins to fade. Nat enters Suman's dreams, where she is violently taking out her resentment on her in-laws, and pleads for her to stop the treatment. Under increasing financial strain due to the factory's ongoing closure, Suman strikes a deal with Nat.

The factory is "re-opened," but it is a ruse to gather the employees and drug them to sleep so that Nat may systematically enter their dreams and deduce whose memories are allowing Tok to haunt the factory. Nat discovers Tok visiting his boyfriend Pin's dreams, and Suman confronts Pin. She offers an ultimatum: receive electroshock therapy to forget Tok, or lose his job. This triggers a violent attack from Tok, which Nat prevents. Pin is escorted away to receive the therapy, and having earned a reputation as a "good ghost" by saving Suman and the factory Nat is now seen by all in her human form.

Dr. Paul summons Nat and March to his home, ostensibly to celebrate her, but ambushes her with a group of political and military figures who are haunted by ghosts stemming from violence by which they have perpetuated or benefited. Some ghosts are fueled by the direct memories of loved ones, others by political dissidents familiar with history. Dr. Paul begs Nat for help systematically investigating individuals to identify those dreaming of ghosts so their memories can be purged via electroshock. Nat initially refuses, but when Dr. Paul holds her frozen eggs hostage she agrees.

Dr. Paul's project to mass-exorcise politically inconvenient ghosts is successful, but disgusts March and drives a wedge between the couple. March claims that Nat has changed so much he is forgetting who she used to be, and attempts to keep the memory of the eradicated ghosts alive by studying the history of the 2010 massacre referenced by Dr. Paul as an origin of vengeful ghosts. On the day that Nat receives her baby, she confesses March's activities to Dr. Paul. Before this information can be used, March has a coughing fit and collapses knocking himself and a celebratory bust of Nat on the ground. X-Ray images of his lungs infer he and his memories of Nat are soon to die. She fades away after a final reconciliation with Suman, who is left alone with Nat and March's child.

Over the course of his story, Krong finds himself attracted to the Ladyboy's distaste for Nat's willingness to sacrifice her own kind for her personal gain. The two make love, and the Ladyboy deduces that Krong is not actually the repairman but the ghost haunting his vacuum. Krong reveals that he was murdered by having his feet encased in concrete and being thrown into a lake; he is tied to the physical world by his daughter's memories, which, thanks to Nat, are almost completely gone. They make love again, and the Ladyboy vows to remember Krong as the ghost disappears.

The Ladyboy dives into the lake and retrieves the concrete block containing Krong's feet, delivering them to Dr. Paul. Reconstituted by this act, Krong and a group of other vengeful ghosts invade Dr. Paul's home with the help of his staff and kill him, his family and associates.

== Cast ==
- Davika Hoorne as Nat
- Witsarut Himmarat as March
- Apasiri Nitibhon as Suman
- Wanlop Rungkumjad as Krong
- Wisarut Homhuan as Academic Ladyboy

== Production ==
The project participated in the 2021 Locarno Film Festival's Open Doors program, where it won the top prize and received a production grant of 35,000 CHF. In October 2022, the project was announced as part of Singaporean production company Momo Film Co.'s slate. In May 2023, it was reported that French production company Haut Les Mains would co-produce the film. In July 2023, it was selected as one of the recipients of Hubert Bals Fund+Europe: Minority Co-production Support during the International Film Festival Rotterdam. In November 2023, it received a €35,000 production grant from Berlinale's World Cinema Fund.

== Release ==
A Useful Ghost had its world premiere on 17 May 2025 at the 2025 Cannes Film Festival in the Critics' Week section. It won the section's Grand Prix. In April 2025, Best Friend Forever had acquired the film's international rights.

The film competed at the Asian Next Wave section of the 2025 QCinema International Film Festival and won the Best Picture. On 28 November 2025, it will close 56th International Film Festival of India.

GDH, under their Out Of The Box label, acquired local distribution rights and it was released in Thailand on August 28, 2025.

== Reception ==
=== Critical reception ===
On the review aggregator website Rotten Tomatoes, 87% of 45 critics' reviews are positive, with an average rating of 7.1/10. The website's consensus reads: "Putting a bracingly unique spin on poltergeists, A Useful Ghost is a refreshing genre-bender that distinguishes debut writer-director Ratchapoom Boonbunchachoke as a filmmaker to watch." On Metacritic, the film has a weighted average score of 85 out of 100 based on 11 critics, which the site labels as "universal acclaim".

=== Accolades ===
Although selected as the Thai entry for Best International Feature Film at the 98th Academy Awards, it was disqualified due to a submission error. Production company 185 Films later confirmed that a coordination failure led to incomplete materials being filed, rendering the film ineligible despite an unsuccessful appeal to the Academy.

| Award | Date of ceremony | Category | Nominee(s) | Result | Ref. |
|---|---|---|---|---|---|
| Cannes Film Festival | 24 May 2025 | Critics' Week Grand Prix | Ratchapoom Boonbunchachoke | Won | |
| Cannes Film Festival | 24 May 2025 | Caméra d'Or | Ratchapoom Boonbunchachoke | Nominated | |
| Sitges Film Festival | 18 October 2025 | Best Feature Film | A Useful Ghost | Nominated | |
| Sitges Film Festival | 18 October 2025 | Best Screenplay | Ratchapoom Boonbunchachoke | Won | |
| Festival du nouveau cinéma | 18 October 2025 | Fierté Montréal Prize | A Useful Ghost | Won | |
| QCinema International Film Festival | 19 November 2025 | Asian New Wave for Best Picture | Ratchapoom Boonbunchachoke | Won | |
| QCinema International Film Festival | 19 November 2025 | Artistic Achievement Award for Production Design | Rasiguet Sookkarn | Won | |
| Jogja-NETPAC Asian Film Festival | 6 December 2025 | Silver Hanoman Award | Ratchapoom Boonbunchachoke | Won | |
| Singapore International Film Festival | 7 December 2025 | Best Asian Feature Film | Ratchapoom Boonbunchachoke | Special Mention | |

== See also ==
- List of submissions to the 98th Academy Awards for Best International Feature Film
- List of Thai submissions for the Academy Award for Best International Feature Film
