= 35th Singapore International Film Festival =

2024 film festival

- Opening film: Stranger Eyes by Yeo Siew Hua
- Location: Singapore
- No. of films: 105
- Festival date: 28 November–8 December 2024
- Website: sgiff.com

Singapore International Film Festival
- 36th 34th

The 35th annual Singapore International Film Festival was held from 28 November to 8 December 2024 in Singapore. A total of 105 films from 45 countries were screened during the festival. The festival opened with Yeo Siew Hua's Stranger Eyes.

Drama film Mongrel won the festival's main award Silver Screen Award for Best Asian Film.

== Juries ==
The following juries were named for the festival.

=== Silver Screen Award for Asian Feature Film ===
- Ossama Mohammed, Syrian film director, Jury President
- Mariana Gaivão, Portuguese filmmaker
- Lou Ye, Chinese director
- Santosh Sivan, Indian cinematographer
- Sofia Jane, Malaysian actress

=== FIPRESCI Award ===
- Daniela Urzola, film critic
- Jason Tan Liwag, scientist and curator
- Timmy Chih-Ting Chen, assistant professor

=== Silver Screen Award for Southeast Asian Short Film ===
- May Adadol Ingawanij, writer and professor
- Sung Moon, film programmer
- Yosep Anggi Noen, film director

== Official selection ==
=== Opening film ===
English title	Original title	Director(s)	Production countrie(s)
Stranger Eyes	默視錄	Yeo Siew Hua	Singapore, Taiwan, France, United States

=== Asian Feature Film Competition ===
English title	Original title	Director(s)	Production countrie(s)
The Adamant Girl	கொட்டுக்காளி	PS Vinothraj	India
April	აპრილი	Dea Kulumbegashvili	Georgia, France, Italy
Crocodile Tears	Air Mata Buaya	Tumpal Tampubolon	Indonesia, France, Singapore, Germany
Edge of Night	Gecenin Kıyısı	Türker Süer	Germany, Turkey
The Great Phuket	小半截	Liu Yaonan	France, Hong Kong, China, Germany, Belgium
Happyend		Neo Sora	Japan, United States
Mongrel	白衣蒼狗	Chiang Wei-liang, Yin You-qiao	France, Singapore, Taiwan
Time to Be Strong	힘을 낼 시간	Namkoong Sun	South Korea
Việt and Nam	Trong lòng đất	Minh Quý Trương	Philippines, Singapore, France, Netherlands, Italy, Germany, Vietnam

=== Standpoint ===
English title	Original title	Director(s)	Production countrie(s)
After the Snowmelt	雪水消融的季節	Lo Yi-shan	Taiwan, Japan
Al Awda		Jason Soo	Singapore
All Shall Be Well	從今以後	Ray Yeung	Hong Kong
Antidote		James Jones	United Kingdom
At Averroès & Rosa Parks	Averroès & Rosa Parks	Nicolas Philibert	France
No Other Land		Basel Adra, Hamdan Ballal, Yuval Abraham, Rachel Szor	Palestine, Norway
A Stone's Throw	على مرمى حجر	Razan AlSalah	Palestine, Lebanon, Canada
Until the Orchid Blooms (opening film)		Polen Ly	France, Cambodia
Xoftex		Noaz Deshe	Germany, France
Youth (Hard Times)	青春：苦	Wang Bing	France, Luxembourg, Netherlands

=== Horizon ===
English title	Original title	Director(s)	Production countrie(s)
An Unfinished Film	一部未完成的电影	Lou Ye	Germany, Singapore
By the Stream	수유천	Hong Sang-soo	South Korea
City of Small Blessings		Wong Chen-hsi	Singapore
Cu Li Never Cries	Cu Li Không Bao Giờ Khóc	Phạm Ngọc Lân	Vietnam, Singapore, France, Philippines, Norway
Don't You Let Me Go	Agarrame fuerte	Ana Guevara and Leticia Jorge	Uruguay
Familiar Touch		Sarah Friedland	United States
Grand Tour		Miguel Gomes	Portugal, Italy, France
Living In Two Worlds	ぼくが生きてる、ふたつの世界	O Mipo	Japan
Olivia & the Clouds	Olivia & Las Nubes	Tomás Pichardo-Espaillat	Dominican Republic
One of Those Days When Hemme Dies	Hemme'nin Öldüğü Günlerden Biri	Murat Fıratoğlu	Turkey
Spirit World (opening film)	Yōkai - le monde des esprits	Eric Khoo	France, Singapore, Japan
When the Phone Rang	Kada je zazvonio telefon	Iva Radivojević	Serbia, United States
Yen and Ai-Lee	小雁與吳愛麗	Tom Lin Shu-yu	Taiwan
Special Presentation
The Fable		Raam Reddy	India, United States

=== Foreground ===
English title	Original title	Director(s)	Production countrie(s)
Brief History of a Family	家庭简史	Lin Jianjie	China, France, Denmark, Qatar
Don't Cry, Butterfly (opening film)	Mưa trên cánh bướm	Dương Diệu Linh	Vietnam, Singapore, Philippines, Indonesia
I Saw the TV Glow		Jane Schoenbrun	United States
The Killers	더 킬러스	Kim Jong-kwan, Roh Deok, Chang Hang-jun, Lee Myung-se	South Korea
La cocina		Alonso Ruizpalacios	Mexico, United States
Nightbitch		Marielle Heller	United States
Orang Ikan		Mike Wiluan	Singapore, Indonesia, Japan, United Kingdom
The Room Next Door		Pedro Almodóvar	Spain
The Shrouds		David Cronenberg	France, Canada
Some Nights I Feel Like Walking		Petersen Vargas	Philippines, Singapore, Italy
Universal Language		Matthew Rankin	Canada
Special Presentation
The Unseen Sister	乔妍的心事	Midi Z	China

=== Landmark ===
English title	Original title	Director(s)	Production countrie(s)
Barking Dogs Never Bite (2000)	플란다스의 개	Bong Joon-ho	South Korea
Bona (1980)		Lino Brocka	Philippines
Crimson Gold (2003)	طلای سرخ	Jafar Panahi	Iran
The Circle (2000)	دایره	Jafar Panahi	Iran, Italy
The Dupes (1972)	Al Makhdu'un	Tewfik Saleh	Syria
The Man Who Left His Will on Film (1970)	東京戦争戦後秘話	Nagisa Ōshima	Japan
Sambizanga (1972)		Sarah Maldoror	Angola
Stars in Broad Daylight (1988) (opening film)	Nujim An-Nahar	Ossama Mohammed	Syria
This Is Not a Film (2011)	این فیلم نیست	Jafar Panahi, Mojtaba Mirtahmasb	Iran
Vive l'amour (1994)	爱情万岁	Tsai Ming-liang	Taiwan
Short films
The Accordion (2010)		Jafar Panahi	Iran
Hidden (2020)		Jafar Panahi	Iran
Where Are You, Jafar Panahi? (2016)	Où en êtes-vous Jafar Panahi?	Jafar Panahi	Iran

== Awards ==
The following awards were presented during the festival:

Asian Feature Film Competition

- Best Asian Feature Film: Mongrel by Chiang Wei-liang and Yin You-qiao
- Best Director: Minh Quý Trương for Việt and Nam
- Best Screenplay: Dea Kulumbegashvili for April
  - Special Mention for Best Screenplay: Liu Yaonan for The Great Phuket
- Best Performance: Li Rongkun for The Great Phuket
  - Special Mention for Best Performance: Ensemble cast and the nature for The Adamant Girl
- FIPRESCI Award: Việt and Nam by Minh Quý Trương

Southeast Asian Short Film Competition

- Best Southeast Asian Short Film: Spirits of the Black Leaves by Thaweechok Phasom
- Best Singapore Short Film: My Wonderful Life by Calleen Koh
- Best Director: Đàm Quang Trung for Elephants by the Roadside
- Best Screenplay: Pom Bunsermvicha and Nicha Ratana-Apiromyakij for The Nature of Dogs
- Best Performance: Sasa Cabalquinto for Vox Humana
- Arri Award for Best Cinematography: Vũ Hoàng Triều for Elephants by the Roadside

Audience Choice Award: An Unfinished Film by Lou Ye

=== Cinema Honorary Award ===
- Jafar Panahi

=== Screen Icon Award ===
- Lee Kang-sheng
- Yang Kuei-mei

=== Outstanding Contribution to Southeast Asian Cinema Award ===
- OBJECTIFS Centre for Photography and Film
