= Diamonds in the Sand =

2024 drama film by Janus Victoria

- Directed by: Janus Victoria
- Written by: Janus Victoria
- Produced by: Masumi Soga; Lorna Tee; Dan Villegas
- Starring: Lily Franky
- Cinematography: Akiko Ashizawa
- Edited by: Mun Thye Soo
- Music by: Jai Saldajeno
- Production companies: Project 8 Projects; Paperheart; Spanic Films; Nathan Studios; CMB Film Services
- Release dates: 23 November 2024 (Japan, Tokyo Filmex); 15 November 2025 (Philippines, QCinema)
- Running time: 102 minutes
- Countries: Philippines; Japan; Malaysia
- Language: Japanese

Diamonds in the Sand (Japanese: 砂の中のダイヤモンド, Hepburn: Suna no naka no daiyamondo; lit. Diamonds in the sand) is a 2024 drama film written and directed by Philippine author-documentary director Janus Victoria in her feature film directorial debut. The film stars Lily Franky as a divorced Japanese salaryman who decided to move to the Philippines, where he believed that no one would be alone. It also stars Charlie Dizon, Maria Isabel Lopez, Soliman Cruz, Stefanie Ariane, and Kazuko Yoshiyuki in one of her final film roles before her death in September 2025.

An international co-production between the Philippines, Japan, and Malaysia, the film had its world premiere in Japan on 23 November 2024, as part of Tokyo Filmex. It was later shown overseas, including the Udine Far East Film Festival in Italy on 27 April 2025, and 69th BFI London Film Festival in the United Kingdom on 10 October 2025. The film has been shown in the Philippines via the 13th QCinema International Film Festival on 15 November 2025.

== Plot ==
The film follows Yoji, a divorced Japanese salaryman who lives alone in Tokyo and takes care of his elderly mother. However, when she died and was warned by her Filipina caregiver about the cases of lonely death, he decided to move to Manila, where he would never feel alone.

== Cast ==
- Lily Franky as Yoji
- Maria Isabel Lopez as Minerva
- Soliman Cruz
- Charlie Dizon as Angel
- Stefanie Ariane as Sheila
- Kazuko Yoshiyuki

== Production ==
In 2010, author and documentary director Janus Victoria became fascinated with the topic of kodokushi (lonely death) after she met the people behind the said topic, commissioned by NHK. With this, she made the concept and was then presented to the people of the 2013 Talents Tokyo, the talent development program for Asian filmmakers which is commissioned by the Berlin International Film Festival, where it won the Grand Prix.

With the help of producers Lorna Tee and Masumi Soga, Victoria spent a total of 11 years bringing the concept into a feature film, five of which were allocated to making the storyline and screenplay.

As part of preparing for the role of Minerva, actress Maria Isabel Lopez underwent Japanese language training for two months, with the help of a tutor. She further stated that 95 percent of the film's written dialogue is in the said language.

== Reception ==
=== Accolades ===
Award	Date	Category	Recipient	Result	Ref.
Udine Far East Film Festival	3 May 2025	White Mulberry Award for First Feature Film	Diamonds in the Sand by Janus Victoria	Won	
13th QCinema International Film Festival	19 November 2025	Asian New Wave - Best Screenplay	Diamonds in the Sand by Janus Victoria	Won	
