= Yeo Siew Hua =

Singaporean director (born 1985)

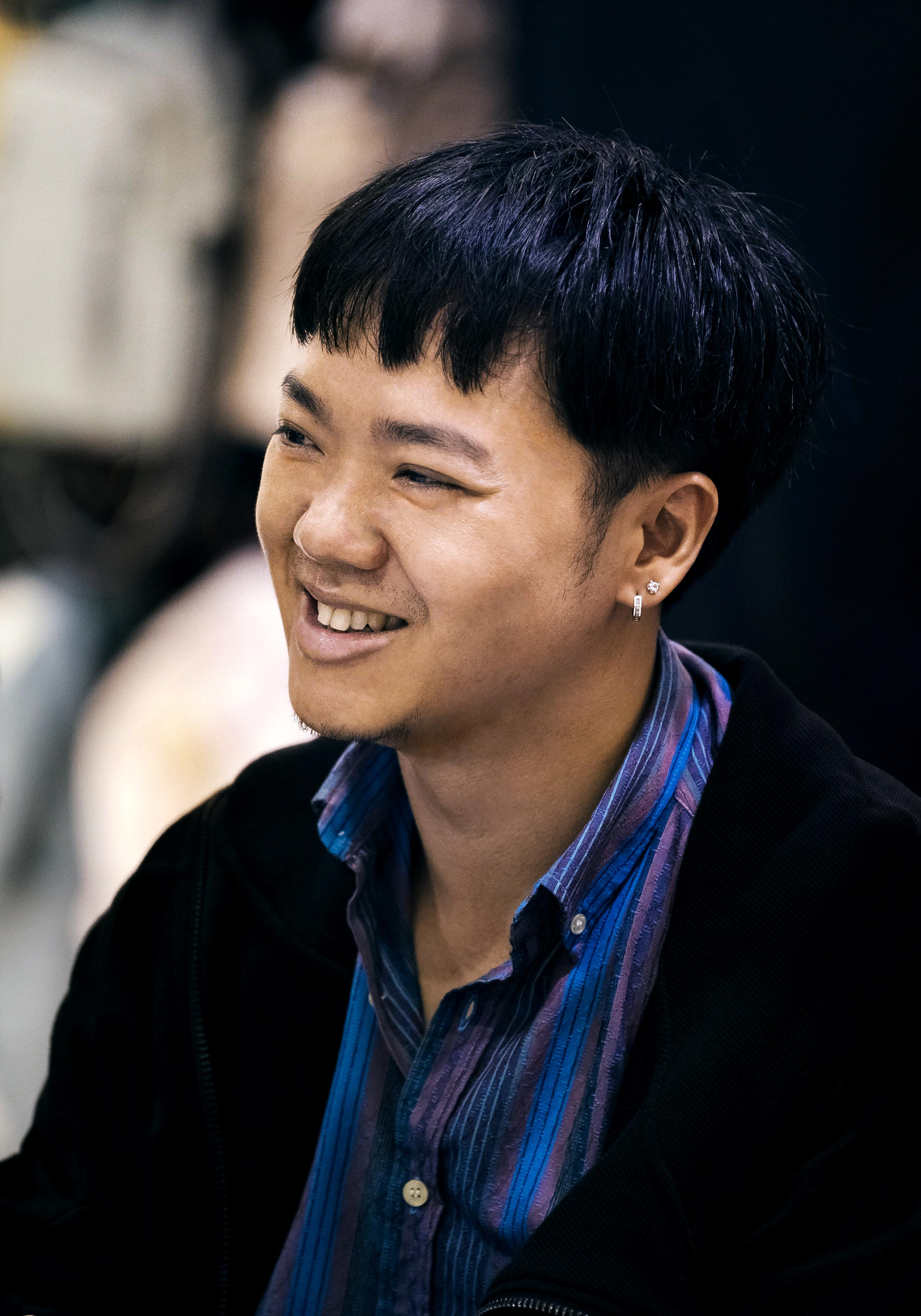
- Yeo in 2023
- Born: 1 April 1985 (age 41); Singapore
- Other names: Chris Yeo; Yang Xiuhua
- Education: Ngee Ann Polytechnic
- Alma mater: National University of Singapore
- Occupations: Director; screenwriter; producer; cinematographer; editor; NFT artist; visual artist; educator
- Years active: 2005−present

Chinese name
- Traditional Chinese: 楊修華
- Simplified Chinese: 杨修华
- Hanyu Pinyin: Yáng Xiūhuá

Yeo Siew Hua (born 1 April 1985) is a Singaporean director, screenwriter and visual artist.

== Education ==
Graduating among the top of his cohort in Ngee Ann Polytechnic's School of Media Studies, Yeo went on to study philosophy at the National University of Singapore.

== Career ==
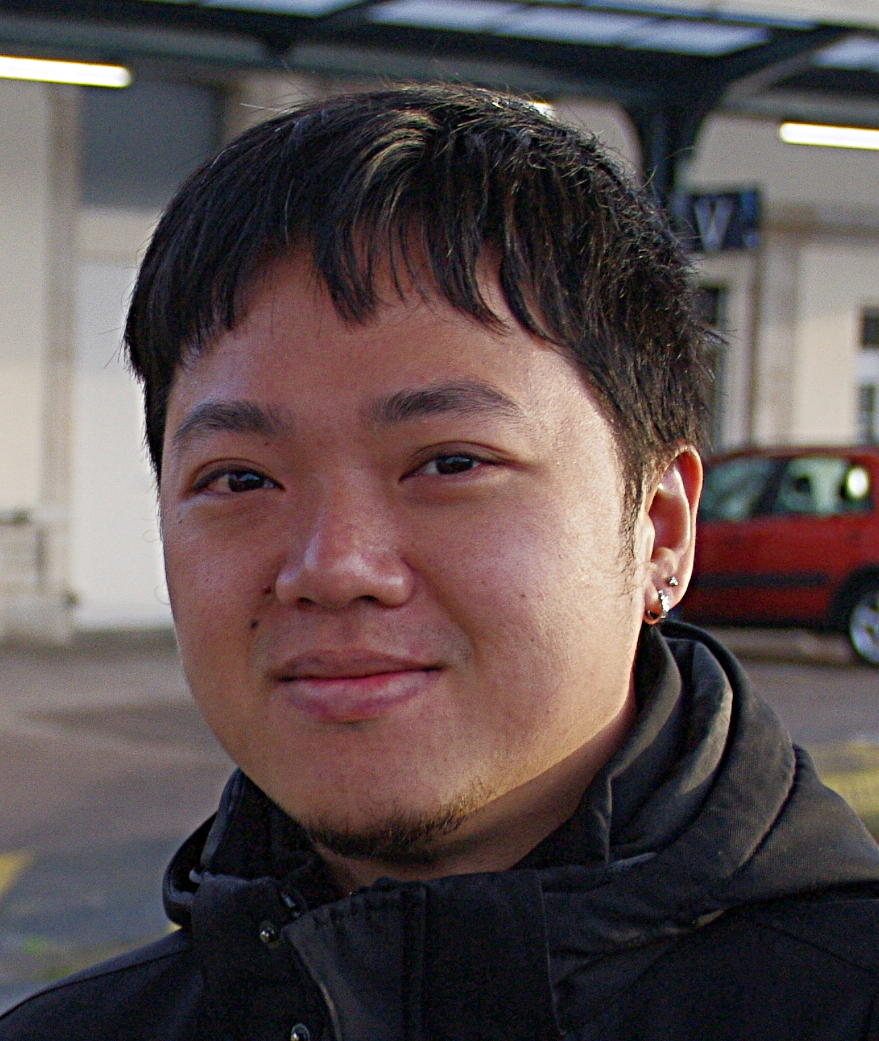
Yeo in 2019

Yeo is a founding member of the 13 Little Pictures film collective and is part of the autonomous art group soft/Wall/studs, where he curates documentary films in conversation with contemporary art practice. His experimental feature debut In the House of Straw (2009) was named by critics as being a significant entry in the Singapore New Wave. With his second feature film A Land Imagined, Yeo became the first Singaporean to win the Golden Leopard Award at Locarno in 2018. The following year, the film went on to win Best Original Screenplay and Best Original Film Score at the Golden Horse Awards, and was also chosen as Singapore's entry for Best International Feature Film at the 92nd Academy Awards.

In 2024, Stranger Eyes premiered in the main competition section of the 81st Venice International Film Festival. It was also selected as the opening film for both the 2024 Taipei Golden Horse Film Festival and the 35th Singapore International Film Festival.

Yeo has also taught at local institutions including the School of the Arts (SOTA), LASALLE College of the Arts, Singapore Polytechnic and Ngee Ann Polytechnic.

In 2021, Yeo received the Young Artist Award, Singapore's most prominent award for young arts practitioners.

== Filmography ==
=== As director, writer and producer ===
Key
†	Denotes films that have not yet been released

Year	Title	Credited as			Notes	Ref.
Year	Title	Director	Writer	Producer	Notes	Ref.
2005	Aik Khoon	No	Yes	No	Short film	
2005	Waking Monkey	Yes	Yes	No	Short film	
2007	Nightless Day	No	Yes	No	Short film; original story	
2009	White Days	No	Yes	No		
2009	In the House of Straw	Yes	Yes	Yes	Feature film	
2012	Wormhole	Yes	Yes	Yes	Short film	
2013	He & His Necktie	No	Yes	No	Short film	
2014	The Obs: A Singapore Story	Yes	Yes	Yes	Documentary	
2015	Mountain of Knives	Yes	Yes	No	Short film	
2015	The Playground: Gone Kimmy Gone	No	Yes	No	Telemovie	
2016	The Minotaur	Yes	Yes	No	Short film	
2016	Rojak	No	Yes	No	TV series	
2016	Run Rachael Run	No	Yes	No	TV series	
2017	Whoopie's World	No	Yes	No	TV series	
2017	Sanjay	No	Yes	No	Short film	
2018	A Land Imagined	Yes	Yes	No	Feature film	
2018	Queen of Hearts	No	Yes	No	TV series	
2019	Incantation	Yes	Yes	Yes	Short film	
2020	The Wandering	Yes	Yes	No	Short film; co-director	
2020	An Invocation to the Earth	Yes	Yes	No	Short film	
2022	The Once and Future	Yes	Yes	No	An expanded cinema work	
2023	Deep End	Yes	No	No	TV series; co-director	
2024	Stranger Eyes	Yes	Yes	No	Feature film	

=== As cinematographer ===
- Aik khoon (2005; short film)
- The Bohemian Rhapsody Project (2006)
- The Lucky Seven Project (2007)

=== As editor ===
- Aik khoon (2005; short film)
- In the House of Straw (2009)

=== Film appearances ===
- Singapore Cinema: Between Takes (2018; documentary)
