= Golden Horse Award for Best Original Film Score =

Taiwanese film award

- Awarded for: Best Original Film Score
- Country: Taiwan
- Presented by: Taipei Golden Horse Film Festival Executive Committee
- First award: 1962
- Currently held by: Charles Humenry for Lucky Lu (2025)
- Website: goldenhorse.org.tw

The Golden Horse Award for Best Original Film Score (Chinese: 金馬獎最佳原創電影音樂) is presented annually at Taiwan's Golden Horse Film Awards. The latest ceremony was held on November 22, 2025, with Charles Humenry winning the award for the film Lucky Lu.

== Winners and nominees ==
indicates the winner

=== 2010s ===
Year	Recipient(s)	English title	Original title
2010 (47th)	Peyman Yazdanian	Spring Fever	春风沉醉的夜晚
2010 (47th)	Lim Giong	Deep in the Clouds	碧罗雪山
2010 (47th)	Wu Rui-ran	When Love Comes	當愛來的時候
2010 (47th)	Sandee Chan	Monga	艋舺
2011 (48th)	Ricky Ho	Warriors of the Rainbow: Seediq Bale	賽德克．巴萊
2011 (48th)	Baby.C, Kay Huang	The Long Goodbye	被遺忘的時光
2011 (48th)	Owen Wang	Jump Ashin!	翻滾吧！阿信
2011 (48th)	Oh Young-mook	The Piano in a Factory	鋼的琴
2012 (49th)	Peyman Yazdanian, Jóhann Jóhannsson	Mystery	浮城谜事
2012 (49th)	Lin Chaoyang, Ding Wei	Love Is Not Blind	失恋33天
2012 (49th)	An Wei, Wang Fan	Judge Archer	箭士柳白猿
2012 (49th)	George Chen	Love	愛
2012 (49th)	Teddy Robin, Tomy Wai	The Bullet Vanishes	消失的子彈

=== 2020s ===
Year	Recipient(s)	English title	Original title	Ref.
2022 (59th)	Wong Hin-yan	The Narrow Road	窄路微塵	
2022 (59th)	Rockid Lee	Incantation	咒	
2022 (59th)	Kenji Kawai	Limbo	智齒	
2022 (59th)	Lee Che-yi, Lim Giong	Salute	我心我行	
2022 (59th)	Point Hsu	Coo-Coo 043	一家子兒咕咕叫	
2023 (60th)	Chris Hou	Old Fox	老狐狸	
2023 (60th)	Thomas Foguenne	Trouble Girl	小曉	
2023 (60th)	Luming Lu	Eye of the Storm	疫起	
2023 (60th)	Yii Kah-hoe, Chong Keat Aun	Snow in Midsummer	五月雪	
2023 (60th)	Luming Lu, Lin Hsiao-chin, Lin Sih-yu, Baobu Badulu	The Pig, the Snake and the Pigeon	周處除三害	
2024 (61st)	Thomas Foguenne	Stranger Eyes	默視錄	
2024 (61st)	The Dead Talents	Dead Talents Society	鬼才之道	
2024 (61st)	Ohmama Takashi	18×2 Beyond Youthful Days	青春18×2 通往有你的旅程	
2024 (61st)	Hanno Yoshihiro, Meuko! Meuko!	Locust	蟲	
2024 (61st)	Amy Chen Xiaoshu	Bel Ami	漂亮朋友	
2025 (62nd)	Charles Humenry	Lucky Lu		
2025 (62nd)	Chou Li-ting, CMgroovy, Vicky Fung	Another World	世外	
2025 (62nd)	Wang Yu-jun, Yannick Dauby	Daughter of Nectar	甘露水	
2025 (62nd)	Thomas Foguenne	The Waves Will Carry Us	人生海海	
2025 (62nd)	Yii Kah-hoe, Chong Keat Aun	Mother Bhumi	地母	

== See also ==
- Academy Award for Best Original Score
- BAFTA Award for Best Original Music
- Cannes Soundtrack Award
- César Award for Best Original Music
- European Film Award for Best Composer
- Golden Globe Award for Best Original Score
- Grammy Award for Best Score Soundtrack for Visual Media
- Hong Kong Film Award for Best Original Film Score
