= Peter Kerekes =

Slovak film director (born 1973)

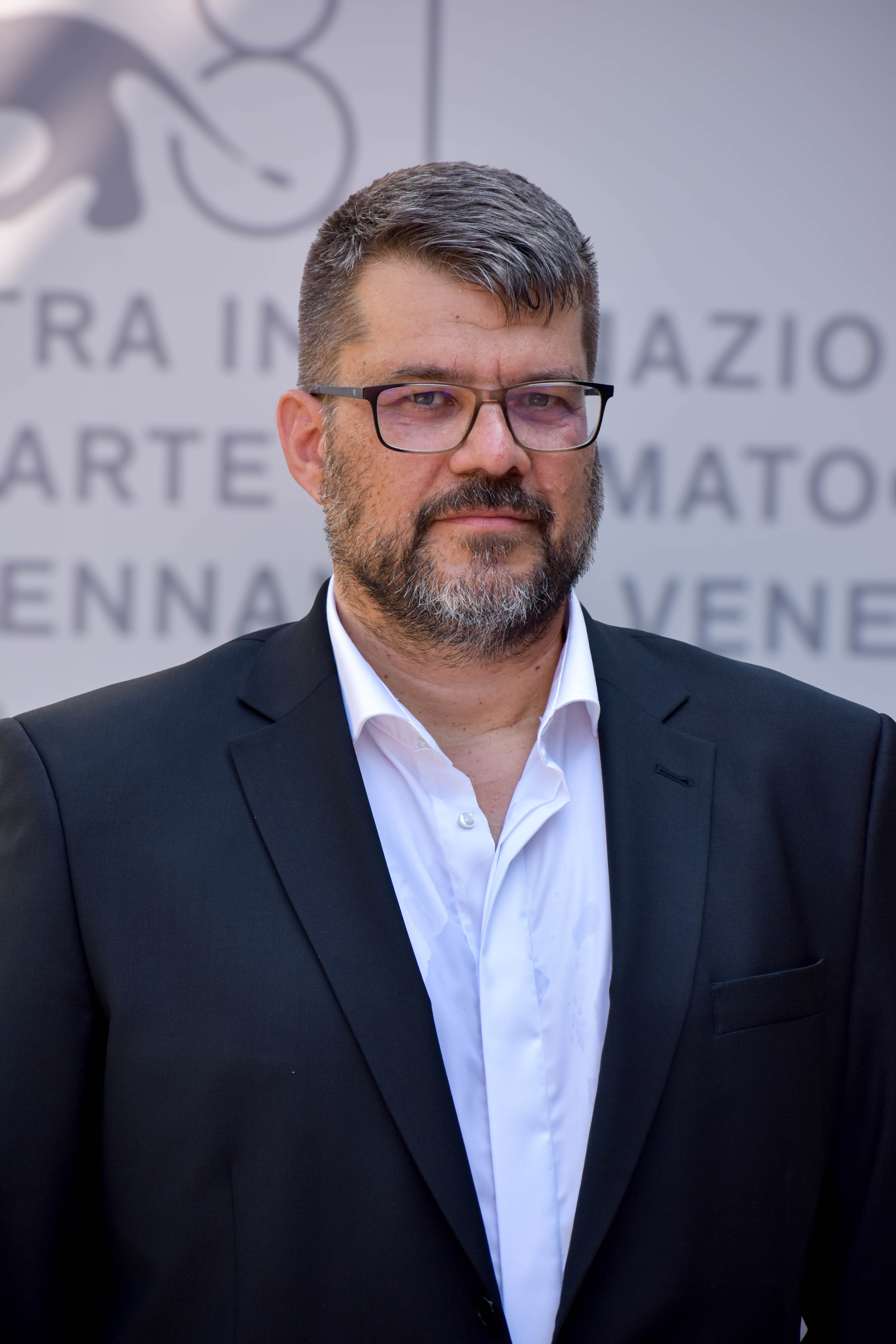
- Kerekes at 81st Venice Film Festival (2024)
- Born: 3 April 1973 (age 53); Košice, Czechoslovakia
- Occupation: Film director

Peter Kerekes (born 3 April 1973) is a Slovak film director, documentarian and screenwriter.

== Life and career ==
Born in Košice, the son of a television director, in 1998 Kerekes majored in documentary direction from the Academy of Performing Arts in Bratislava and in 2002 completed his doctorate.

After several student films and the television documentary Ladomírské Morytates and Legends, in 2003 he directed the documentary film 66 Seasons, a portrait of Slovak history between 1936 and 2002 through the lens of the Košice Municipal Swimming Pool. The film won the best European documentary award at the 2003 Ji.hlava International Documentary Film Festival, and the Best Director Award at the 2004 Docaviv.

Following a five years production with shootings in 11 different European countries, his 2009 documentary film about military cooks Cooking History won several awards including the international feature prize at the Hot Docs Canadian International Documentary Festival, and got a nomination for the best documentary award at the 22nd European Film Awards. His following film Velvet Terrorists (2013), a documentary about three Czechoslovak anti-communist activists he co-directed by Palo Pekar and Ivan Ostrochovsk, also won a string of awards including the Tagesspiegel Audience Prize at the 64th Berlin International Film Festival, and the Fedeora Award at the 48th Karlovy Vary International Film Festival.

In 2021, his film 107 Mothers premiered at the 78th Venice International Film Festival, where it won the Orizzonti Award for Best Screenplay, and was the Slovak entry for Best International Feature Film at the 94th Academy Awards. In 2024, Kerekes returned to the Venice Film Festival with the astrology-themed docudrama Wishing on a Star. The same year, he was awarded a Pribina Cross of Second Class.

== Selected filmography ==
- Cooking History (2009)
- Velvet Terrorists (2013)
- 107 Mothers (2021)
- Wishing on a Star (2024)
