= In My Mother's Skin =

2023 film by Kenneth Dagatan

- Release poster
- Directed by: Kenneth Dagatan
- Written by: Kenneth Dagatan
- Produced by: Bradley Liew; Huang Junxiang; Bianca Balbuena; Stefano Centini
- Starring: Beauty Gonzalez; Felicity Kyle Napuli; Jasmine Curtis-Smith; James Mavie Estrella; Angeli Bayani
- Cinematography: Russell Morton
- Edited by: Ming-Cheng Kao
- Music by: Sing Wu
- Production companies: Epicmedia; Zhao Wei Films; Volos Films; Clover Films
- Distributed by: Amazon Studios
- Release dates: January 21, 2023 (Sundance); October 12, 2023
- Running time: 97 minutes
- Countries: Philippines; Singapore; Taiwan
- Language: Filipino

In My Mother's Skin is a 2023 folk horror film written and directed by Kenneth Dagatan. It stars Beauty Gonzalez, Felicity Kyle Napuli, James Mavie Estrella, Angeli Bayani, Ronnie Lazaro, Arnold Reyes, Noel Sto. Domingo and Jasmine Curtis-Smith. Set during World War II, the film's plot follows a young girl who, while tending to her dying mother, becomes acquainted with a flesh-eating fairy.

The film premiered at Sundance as part of the festival's "Midnight" section on January 21, 2023, It is the only non-English-language film in the section. Amazon Studios acquired the global rights to the film, marking its first acquisition of the festival, and was made available to stream worldwide on Prime Video on October 12, 2023.

== Premise ==
As World War II in 1945 Philippines is coming to an end, a wealthy family is trapped in their country mansion and terrorized by Japanese soldiers who are losing control of the island. The family's patriarch, Aldo, is rumored to have stolen Japanese gold and hidden it nearby. Knowing that his family will be killed if the gold is found, Aldo leaves to seek help from the Americans. His absence causes the family to fear that he will never return, while the mother's health deteriorates. Desperate for help, the family's young daughter Tala turns to a deceitful and flesh-eating fairy, who plans to devour them all.

== Cast ==
- Beauty Gonzalez as Ligaya
- Felicity Kyle Napuli as Tala
- James Mavie Estrella as Bayani
- Jasmine Curtis-Smith as Fairy
- Angeli Bayani as Amor

== Production ==
Principal photography took place in Bacolod and it took 16 days until July 2022.

== Release ==
An international co-production of the Philippines, Singapore and Taiwan, In My Mother's Skin premiered at the 2023 Sundance Film Festival, as part of the festival's "Midnight" section on January 21, 2023. It is the only non-English-language film in the section. Amazon MGM Studios acquired the global rights to the film, marking its first acquisition of the festival, and made it available to stream worldwide on Prime Video on October 12, 2023.

== Reception ==
On the review aggregator website Rotten Tomatoes, 88% of 33 critics' reviews are positive, with an average rating of 6.9/10. The website's consensus reads: "Grim and macabre, In My Mother's Skin is a bleakly effective blend of historical and supernatural horror." Metacritic, which uses a weighted average, assigned the film a score of 73 out of 100, based on eight critics, indicating "generally favorable" reviews.

Reviewing In My Mother's Skin following its premiere at Sundance, Benjamin Franz of Film Threat gave the film a score of 8 out of 10 and wrote: "… guaranteed to give you nightmares."
