= Body Electric (film) =

2017 film directed by Marcelo Caetano

- Portuguese: Corpo Elétrico
- Directed by: Marcelo Caetano
- Screenplay by: Marcelo Caetano
- Produced by: Marcelo Caetano; Roberto Tibiriçá
- Starring: Kelner Macêdo; Lucas Andrade
- Distributed by: Vitrine Filmes
- Release date: August 17, 2017 (Brazil)
- Country: Brazil
- Language: Portuguese

Body Electric (Portuguese: Corpo Elétrico) is a 2017 Brazilian film directed and written by Marcelo Caetano.

== Cast ==
- Kelner Macêdo ... Elias
- Lucas Andrade ... Wellington
- Welket Bungué ... Fernando
- Ana Flavia Cavalcanti ... Carla
- Daniel Torres ... Cristovão
- Dani Nefussi ... Diana
- Emerson Ferreira ... Gilberto
- Ernani Sanchez ... Walter
- Evandro Cavalcante ... Alexandre

== Awards ==
Guadalajara International Film Festival

1. Best Feature Film

Outfest

1. Grand Jury Award - Honorable Mention

Rotterdam International Film Festival

1. Best First Film (Nominee)

San Sebastián International Film Festival

1. Best Latin American Film (Nominee)

São Paulo Association of Art Critics Awards

1. Best Film
