= A Thousand Forests =

2024 Philippine musical film

- Theatrical release poster
- Directed by: Hanz Florentino
- Written by: Jeffrey Ocampo
- Story by: Jenie Chan
- Starring: Dennah Bautista; Santino Juan Santiago; Ramjean Entera; James Mavie JM Estrella; Venice Angela Bismonte
- Cinematography: Pantit Pablo
- Edited by: Hanz Florentino
- Music by: Jenie Chan
- Production companies: University of the Philippines Los Baños; I.Syoot Multimedia Production
- Release date: June 26, 2024
- Running time: 117 minutes
- Country: Philippines
- Language: Filipino

A Thousand Forests is a 2024 Philippine coming-of-age musical film written by Jeff Ocampo and directed by Hanz Florentino. It stars Ramjean Entera, Venice Angela Bismonte, James Mavie Estrella, Dennah Bautista and Santino Juan Santiago. The film is about Five teenagers join the Philippine Forest Camp for a chance to travel the world. As they navigate their journey, they discover their strengths and passions while seeing all of the environmental issues.

== Synopsis ==
A Thousand Forests is a story of self-discovery and environmental action through musical sequences and poignant scenes.

== Cast ==
=== Main cast ===
- Dennah Bautista as Skye Jung: A frustrated teen beauty queen who wishes to redeem herself from a previous beauty pageant scandal.
- Santino Juan Santiago as Champ Villanueva: Coming from a family of accomplished athletes, he perseveres to become a track-and-field star.
- Ramjean Entera as Morena Rivera: A fisherman's daughter who dreams of becoming a marine scientist. She has witnessed how illegal mountain mining carries harmful chemicals from the rivers to the sea.
- James Mavie JM Estrella as Rashid Ahmed: Wise beyond his years, a serious thirteen-year-old Muslim from Maguindanao. His family experienced a tragedy that motivated him to become a young environmental crusader.
- Venice Angela Bismonte as Sunshine Tolentino: Together with her mother, Sunshine has a weekly vlog that promotes self-love, body positivity, as well as environmental awareness. But deep inside, she still feels insecure about her appearance.

=== Supporting cast ===
- Dominic Ochoa as Bani Gualberto
- Chai Fonacier as Crystal Flores
- Qhlouey Moreno as Colleen Villena
- Prince Espana as Ali Ahmed
- Cai Cortez as Lovely Tolentino
- Leslie Hidalgo as Laarni Villanueva
- Jeffrey Hidalgo as Diego Villanueva
- Cath Salazar as Stella Catacutan-Jung
- Aileen Sahibad as Fatima Ahmed
- Butchoy Ubaldo as Antonio Rivera
- Rollie Inocencio as Ibrahim Ahmed
- Trina Tolentino as Paz Lopez
- Dean Marlo Mendoza as Judge 1
- Hancellor Jose V. Camacho Jr. as Judge 2
- Dr. Rodel Lasco
- Yen Manlapaz as Jane
- Eury Escudero as Henry
- Melisa Lyn Altarejos as Fairy 1
- Jennie Domanguera as Fairy 2
- Yvannah Charlize Corpuz as Fairy 3
- Joseph DM Esguerra as Kuya Mark Forester

== Production ==
This film is phase one of the “A Thousand Forests” program, a multi-sectorial nationwide initiative aimed at enhancing collaborative greening programs, designed by the University of the Philippines Los Baños - College of Forestry and Natural Resources.

It is based on real events and inspired by a Filipino environmentalist and philanthropist Gina Lopez.

== Release ==
The film was premiered at SM North EDSA on June 25, 2024, and release on June 26, 2024, under I.Syoot Multimedia Production.

In the same year, the film is included in the 2024 QCinema International Film Festival as an entry.

== Critical response ==
Goldwin Reviews gave the film a rating of 2 out of 5 rating and wrote: The story provides little tension towards a problem that requires urgency. The film is more entertaining than alarming. The spoonfeeding of information didn’t help in amplifying the cry for call to action.

John Tawasil of Society of Filipino Film Reviewers gave the film a review rating of 2.5 over 5 and he said: It's fairly entertaining and at least decently made for a film seemingly catered to a younger audience and the songs are nice, though the script doesn't always work.

Film Circle Reject gave the film a rating of 2 over 5 rating and wrote: I support the film's advocacy of taking care of our environment before it's too late. However, as a film, it does have its flaws.
