= 107 Mothers =

2021 docudrama film

- International release poster
- Directed by: Peter Kerekes
- Screenplay by: Ivan Ostrochovský; Péter Kerekes
- Story by: Ivan Ostrochovský
- Produced by: Ivan Ostrochovský
- Starring: Maryna Klimova
- Cinematography: Martin Kollár
- Edited by: Thomas Ernst; Martin Piga
- Music by: Lucia Chutkova
- Production companies: Punkchart films Rozhlas a televízia Slovenska; Endorfilm; Arthouse Traffic; Peter Kerekes; Hypermarket Film
- Release date: 1 September 2021 (Venice)
- Running time: 93 minutes
- Countries: Slovakia; Czech Republic; Ukraine
- Languages: Russian; Ukrainian

107 Mothers (version in Ukrainian: «Цензорка», romanized: Tsenzor, lit. 'Censor') is a 2021 docudrama film directed by Peter Kerekes who co-wrote the screenplay with Ivan Ostrochovský. Its world premiere took place on 1 September 2021 at the 78th Venice International Film Festival, where it was screened in Horizons competition program. It was selected as the Slovak entry for the Best International Feature Film at the 94th Academy Awards. It is a co-production between Slovakia, the Czech Republic and Ukraine.

== Plot ==
In a Ukrainian women's prison, mothers are permitted to serve their sentences with their children until their third birthday.

== Cast ==
- Maryna Klimova
- Iryna Kiryazeva
- Lyubov Vasylyna

== See also ==
- List of submissions to the 94th Academy Awards for Best International Feature Film
- List of Slovak submissions for the Academy Award for Best International Feature Film
