= Heads or Tails? (2025 film) =

2025 film by Alessio Rigo de Righi and Matteo Zoppis

- Italian theatrical release poster
- Italian: Testa o croce?
- Directed by: Alessio Rigo de Righi; Matteo Zoppis
- Written by: Alessio Rigo de Righi; Matteo Zoppis; Carlo Salsa
- Produced by: Tommaso Bertani; Alex C. Lo; Olivia Musini; Filippo Montalto; Stefano Centini
- Starring: Nadia Tereszkiewicz; Alessandro Borghi; John C. Reilly; Peter Lanzani; Mirko Artuso; Gabriele Silli; Gianni Garko
- Cinematography: Simone D'Arcangelo
- Edited by: Andres P. Estrada; Jacopo Ramella Pajrin
- Music by: Vittorio Giampietro
- Production companies: Ring Film; Cinema Inutile; Cinemaundici; Andromeda Film; Volos Films; Rai Cinema
- Distributed by: 01 Distribution (Italy); Samuel Goldwyn Films (United States)
- Release dates: 22 May 2025 (Cannes); 2 October 2025 (Italy); 10 April 2026 (United States)
- Running time: 107 minutes
- Countries: Italy; United States
- Languages: English; Italian

Heads or Tails? (Italian: Testa o croce?) is a 2025 western film co-written and directed by Alessio Rigo de Righi and Matteo Zoppis. It stars Nadia Tereszkiewicz, Alessandro Borghi, John C. Reilly, and Peter Lanzani. The film had its world premiere in the Un Certain Regard section of the 78th Cannes Film Festival on 22 May 2025. It received a theatrical release in Italy on 2 October 2025.

== Plot ==
In the early 1900s, Buffalo Bill visited Italy on a tour of his traveling Wild West Show, bringing the myth of American cowboys to Italy. During a show in Rome, he was challenged by Ercole Rupè, a local squire who ran a butteri club, who claimed his butteri were more skilled than Bill's cowboys. However, Rupè decided to bet on the American and asked his butteri to lose on purpose, but the talented Santino refuses and wins the challenge. Rupè is engaged to a charming young French woman, Rosa, whom he constantly abuses and insults. After winning the challenge and losing the bet, Rupè reaches out to Santino and witnesses him approaching Rosa. In a rage, Rupè insults and beats his girlfriend and threats Santino, but is killed by a gunshot fired by Rosa.

Rosa and Santino go into hiding, determined to go to America, Rosa's dream, while Rupè's elderly and extremely wealthy father places a bounty on the head of the buttero, believed to be responsible for the murder, and tasks Buffalo Bill with finding the two fugitives. During their escape, Rosa and Santino fall in love and become engaged, meeting various personalities along the way, including a group of anarchist rebels who see Santino as a model of revolt against the rich and the lords. The group of rebels is attacked by soldiers, and during the shootout, the two lovers attempt to escape, but shortly before they can, Santino is killed by Giovanni "Zecchino," a criminal who is part of the rebel group but who, along with his brother, wants to collect the substantial price placed on the man's head.

Rosa is kidnapped and wakes up in a cave overlooking the sea, tied to a goat cage, while Zecchino and his brother argue over who will bring Santino's severed head to Mr. Rupè. While the two brothers argue and kill each other, Rosa flees, carrying away the head of her beloved. Overcome by despair, fear, and madness, she imagines Santino's head still alive and communicating with her.

Buffalo Bill, followed by one of his men and the headless body of Santino, carried on Rosa's horse, finds the girl and offers her two options, to be decided by a game of heads or tails: if heads, they would engage in a gunfight; if tails, she would be free to continue on her way. The outcome of the challenge is unclear, but Rosa continues on her way, carrying Santino's head, her horse, and Bill's notebook.

The girl reaches Mr. Rupè, presents him with Santino's head, and forces him to hand over the promised reward. Once she has the money, Rosa confesses to being Ercole's killer, recovers Santino's head, and flees again, galloping through the countryside on her white horse.

== Cast ==
- Nadia Tereszkiewicz as Rosa
- Alessandro Borghi as Santino
- John C. Reilly as Buffalo Bill
- Peter Lanzani as Rebel Leader
- Mirko Artuso as Ercole Rupè
- Gabriele Silli as Zecchino
- Gianni Garko as Mr. Rupè

== Production ==
Directors Alessio Rigo de Righi and Matteo Zoppis read books and dime novels to research the character of Buffalo Bill. They stated that John C. Reilly's characterization of the character was a collaborative effort with Reilly himself.

When John came on board, he was exactly what we were looking for, not only tonally. He also had some ideas and brought many insights into the character, including many ironic aspects, and what he could look like and what he could do. I remember John came up with how the character spoke. And he even proposed wearing the suit he wears in the second part of the film.

— Alessio Rigo de Righi

Principal photography took place in Lazio and Tuscany in late 2024. Filming was completed by December 2024.

== Release ==
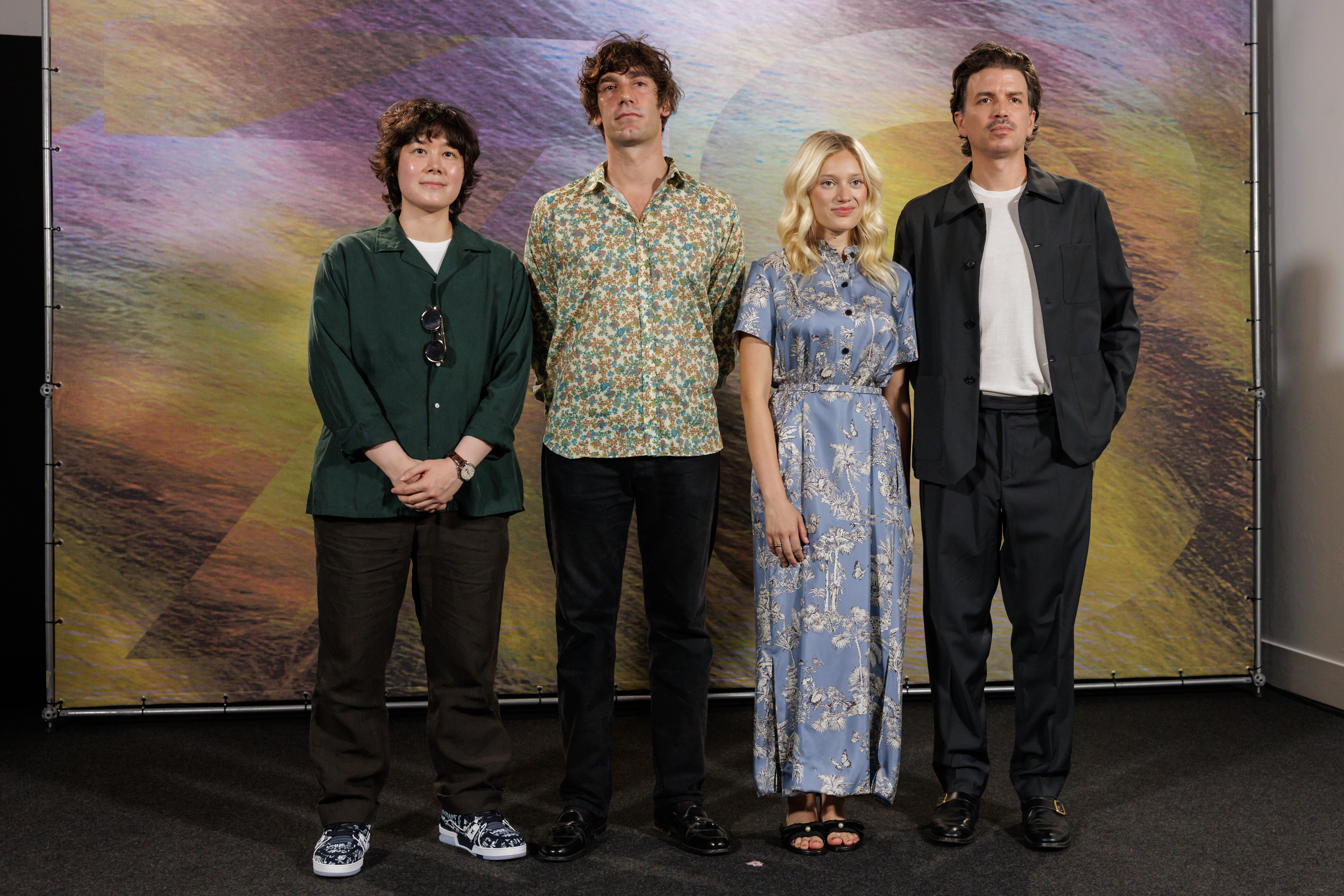
Alex C. Lo, Matteo Zoppis, Nadia Tereszkiewicz, and Alessio Rigo de Righi at the Heads or Tails? photocall at the 78th Locarno Film Festival.

Rai Cinema International Distribution owns the international sales rights to the film. A promotional clip was released on 20 May 2025. The film was screened in the Un Certain Regard section of the 78th Cannes Film Festival on 22 May 2025. In August 2025, Samuel Goldwyn Films acquired the North American rights. The film received a theatrical release in Italy on 2 October 2025. The film was released in theaters and on demand on in the United States on 10 April 2026.

== Reception ==
On the review aggregator website Rotten Tomatoes, 84% of 19 critics' reviews are positive.

=== Accolades ===
Award	Date of ceremony	Category	Recipient(s)	Result	Ref.
Cannes Film Festival	24 May 2025	Prix Un Certain Regard	Matteo Zoppis and Alessio Rigo de Righi	Nominated	
