= Stranger Eyes =

2024 film directed by Yeo Siew Hua

- Traditional Chinese: 默視錄
- Hanyu Pinyin: Mò shì lù
- Directed by: Yeo Siew Hua
- Written by: Yeo Siew Hua
- Produced by: Fran Borgia; Stefano Centini; Jean-Laurent Csinidis; Alex C. Lo
- Starring: Lee Kang-sheng; Wu Chien-ho
- Cinematography: Hideho Urata
- Edited by: Jean-Christophe Bouzy
- Music by: Thomas Foguenne
- Production companies: Akanga Film Asia; Volos Films; Films de Force Majeure; Cinema Inutile
- Distributed by: Epicentre Films (France)
- Release date: September 5, 2024 (Venice)
- Running time: 126 minutes
- Countries: Singapore; Taiwan; France; United States
- Box office: $12,666

Stranger Eyes (Chinese: 默視錄) is a 2024 internationally co-produced mystery thriller film directed by Yeo Siew Hua starring Lee Kang-sheng and Wu Chien-ho.

The film premiered in the main competition section of the 81st Venice International Film Festival, becoming the first Singaporean film to compete for the Golden Lion. It was also selected as the opening film for both the 2024 Taipei Golden Horse Film Festival and the 35th Singapore International Film Festival.

It was selected as the Singaporean entry for Best International Feature Film at the 98th Academy Awards, but it was not nominated.

== Premise ==
After young father Darren's daughter goes missing, he begins to receive video recordings of his personal life. He suspects that his neighbor Goh is the culprit and begins surveilling him in a hunt for answers.

== Cast ==
- Wu Chien-ho as Junyang
- Lee Kang-sheng as Lao Wu
- Anicca Panna as Peiying
- Vera Chen as Shuping
- Xenia Tan as Ling Po
- Pete Teo as Officer Zheng
- Maryanne Ng-Yew as Mother Wu
- Mila Troncoso as Ana

== Production ==
Stranger Eyes received the HAF Fiction Award at the 2020 Hong Kong – Asia Film Financing Forum. The film also received funding from Singapore's Infocomm Media Development Authority, the French Aide aux Cinémas du monde, the Taiwan Creative Content Agency (TAICCA), and Purin Pictures from Thailand.

In August 2023, Variety reported that Lee Kang-sheng had been cast in the film and that principal photography was underway. The report noted that post-production was expected to wrap by early 2024.

== Release ==
Stranger Eyes had its world premiere in the main competition section of the 81st Venice International Film Festival on 5 September 2024. It made its North American premiere in the Main Slate of the 62nd New York Film Festival. It screened as the opening film of the 35th Singapore International Film Festival on 28 November 2024.

== Reception ==
=== Critical response ===
On the review aggregator website Rotten Tomatoes, 83% of 41 critics' reviews are positive. The website's consensus reads: "A haunting and deliberately offbeat thriller, Stranger Eyes trades conventional suspense for a poignant and compellingly elusive meditation on surveillance, solitude, and fading trust." On Metacritic, the film has a weighted average score of 68 out of 100 based on 7 critics, which the site labels as "generally favorable" reviews.

=== Accolades ===
Award	Year	Category	Recipient(s)	Result	Ref.
Asian Film Awards	2025	Best Supporting Actor	Lee Kang-sheng	Won	
Asian Film Awards	2025	Best Sound	Tu Duu-chih, Tu Tse-kang	Won	
Asia Pacific Screen Awards	2024	Best Cinematography	Hideho Urata	Nominated	
Golden Horse Awards	2024	Best Narrative Feature	Stranger Eyes	Nominated	
Golden Horse Awards	2024	Best Director	Yeo Siew Hua	Nominated	
Golden Horse Awards	2024	Best Original Screenplay	Yeo Siew Hua	Nominated	
Golden Horse Awards	2024	Best Supporting Actor	Lee Kang-sheng	Nominated	
Golden Horse Awards	2024	Best Original Film Score	Thomas Foguenne	Won	
Golden Horse Awards	2024	Best Sound Effects	Tu Duu-chih, Tu Tse-kang	Nominated	
Taipei Film Awards	2025	Best Narrative Feature	Stranger Eyes	Nominated	
Taipei Film Awards	2025	Best Director	Yeo Siew Hua	Nominated	
Taipei Film Awards	2025	Best Screenplay	Yeo Siew Hua	Nominated	
Taipei Film Awards	2025	Best Supporting Actor	Lee Kang-sheng	Won	
Taipei Film Awards	2025	Best Music	Thomas Foguenne	Won	
Valladolid International Film Festival	2024	Silver Spike	Stranger Eyes	Won	
Venice Film Festival	2024	Golden Lion	Yeo Siew Hua	Nominated	

== See also ==
- List of submissions to the 98th Academy Awards for Best International Feature Film
- List of Singaporean submissions for the Academy Award for Best International Feature Film
