= Locarno 2020 Film Festival =

Film festival in Locarno, Switzerland

- Festival official poster
- Opening film: First Cow by Kelly Reichardt
- Closing film: La France contre les Robots, by Jean-Marie Straub
- Location: Locarno, Switzerland; Online Screenings
- Founded: 1946
- Awards: Golden Leopard
- Hosted by: Associazione Festival del film Locarno
- No. of films: Programmed: 121; Online Screenings: 83; Theatrical Screenings: 103
- Festival date: Opening: 5 August 2020; Closing: 15 August 2020
- Website: Locarno Film Festival

Locarno Film Festival
- 74th 72nd

The Locarno 2020 – For the Future of Films was held in place of the 73rd Locarno Film Festival from 5 to 15 August 2020 in Locarno, Switzerland and online. Due to the COVID-19 pandemic the 73rd festival was canceled and in its place was a hybrid of in-person and virtual screenings. No traditional Golden Leopard was awarded.

The 2020 festival screened 20 unfinished projects that were suspended due to the pandemic and awarded money to the winners: $73,000 (CHF 70,000) for each Pardo 2020 winner. Other festival awards also distributed money and the Swiss Broadcasting Corporation awarded $124,000 (CHF 100,000) worth of advertising on its channels to the SRG SSR Award winners. The opening film of the festival was First Cow by Kelly Reichardt.

== Juries ==
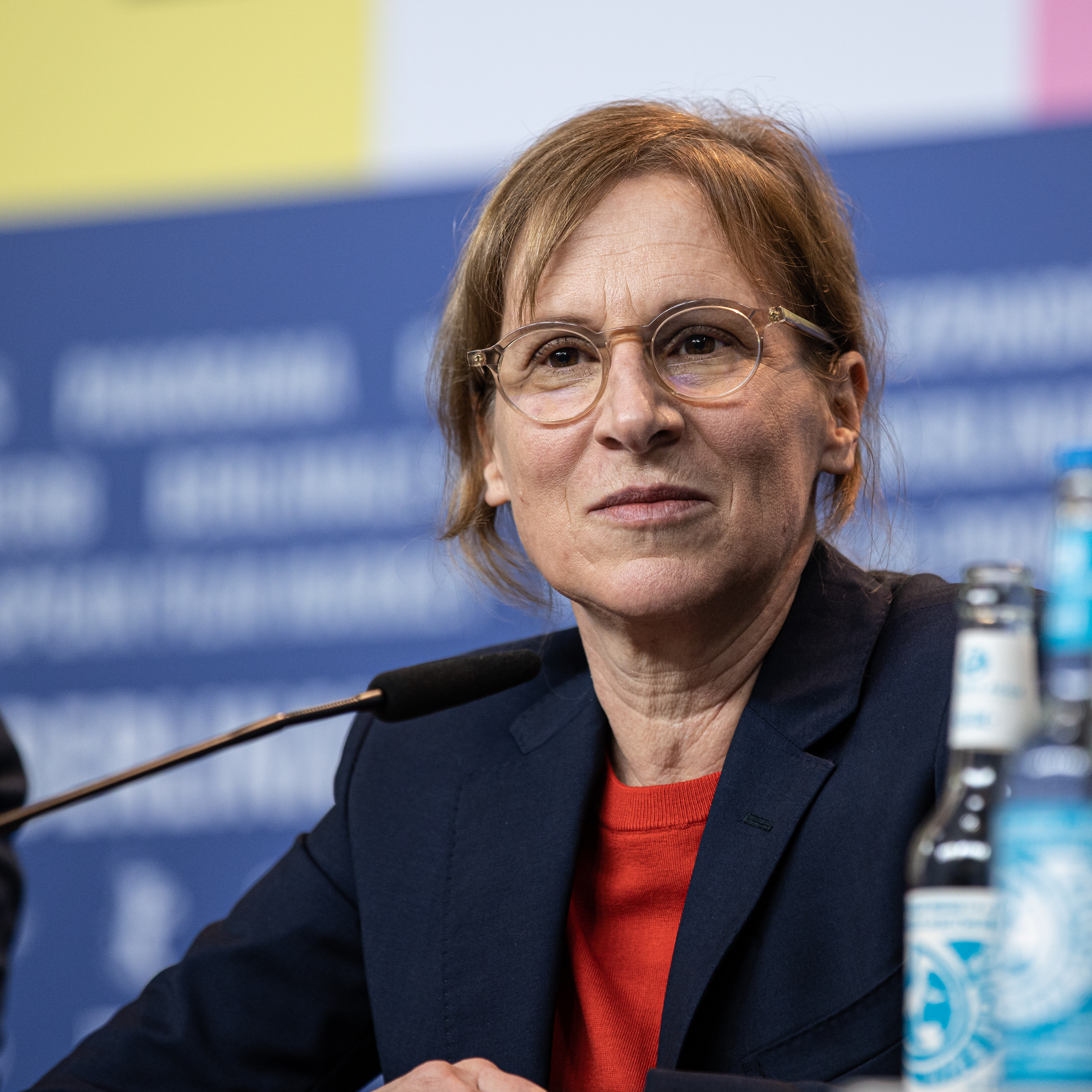
Kelly Reichardt, international competition jury member

=== International competition - The Films After Tomorrow ===
- Kelly Reichardt, American director
- Nadav Lapid, Israeli writer and director
- Lemohang Jeremiah Mosese, Lesothian screenwriter, director and cinematographer

=== Swiss selection jury ===
- Alina Marazzi, Italian and Swiss director
- Matías Piñeiro, Argentinian director, writer and artist
- Mohsen Makhmalbaf, Iranian director, producer, editor, screenwriter and activist

=== Leopards of Tomorrow ===
- Kiri Dalena, Philippine filmmaker and visual artist
- Mamadou Dia, Senegalese filmmaker
- Claudette Godfrey, American Senior Film Programmer of SXSW

== Sections ==
The following films were selected to receive screening in the sections below:

=== The films after tomorrow ===
==== International selection ====
This section screened unfinished projects that were suspended due to the pandemic.

Highlighted title indicates winner

English title	Original Title	Director(s)	Production Country
''Chocobar''		Lucrecia Martel	Argentina, United States, Denmark, Mexico
Cidade; Campo		Juliana Rojas	Brazil
The Fabric of the Human Body	De Humani Corporis Fabrica	Véréna Paravel, Lucien Castaing-Taylor	France, United States
Eureka		Lisandro Alonso	France/Germany/Portugal/Mexico/Argentina
Human Flowers of Flesh		Helena Wittmann	Germany/France
I Come from Ikotun		Wang Bing	France/China
When the Waves Are Gone	Kapag Wala Nang Mga Alon	Lav Diaz	Philippines/France/Portugal/Denmark
Nowhere Near		Miko Revereza	Philippines/Mexico/USA
Little Solange	Petite Solange	Axelle Ropert	France
Savagery	Selvajaria	Miguel Gomes	Portugal/France/Brazil/China/Greece

==== Swiss selection ====
Highlighted title indicates winner

English title	Original Title	Director(s)	Production Country
Azor		Andreas Fontana	Switzerland/Argentina/France
A Piece of Sky	Ein Stück Himmel	Michael Koch	Switzerland/Germany
Far West		Pierre-François Sauter	Switzerland/Portugal/Italy
A Flower in the Mouth		Eric Baudelaire	Switzerland/France
L'Afrique des Femmes		Mohammed Soudani	Switzerland/Ivory Coast
Les Histoires d'Amour de Liv S.		Anna Luif	Switzerland
Lux		Raphaël Dubach, Mateo Ybarra	Switzerland
Olga		Elie Grappe	Switzerland/France
Unrest	Unrueh	Cyril Schäublin	Switzerland
Zahorí		Marí Alessandrini	Switzerland/Argentina/Chile/France

=== A journey in the festival's history ===
This section was selected by directors whose films were featured in "The Films After Tomorrow" section of the Festival.

Title	Director(s)	Year	Locarno Festival	Prize	Production Country	Picked by	Screening
Germany, Year Zero	Roberto Rossellini	1948	3rd Festival	Grand Prix, Prize for Best Original Screenplay (ex æquo), Best Director (Second Prize)	Italy, France, Germany	Pierre-François Sauter	Online and physical screening
Love Meetings	Pier Paolo Pasolini	1964	17th Festival		Italy	Anna Luif	Online screening
Entranced Earth	Glauber Rocha	1967	20th Festival	Youth Jury Grand Prix, FIPRESCI International Critics' Prize, Swiss Critics' Prize	Brazil	Lisandro Alonso	Online and physical screening
Charles, Dead or Alive	Alain Tanner	1969	22nd Festival	Pardo d'oro, Youth Jury Prize	Switzerland	Raphaël Dubach, Mateo Ybarra	Online and physical screening
Invasión	Hugo Santiago	1969	22nd Festival	International Jury Special Mention	Argentina	Andreas Fontana	Online and physical screening
In Danger and Deep Distress, the Middleway Spells Certain Death	Alexander Kluge, Edgar Reitz	1974	27th Festival		Federal Republic of Germany	Juliana Rojas	Online screening
India Song	Marguerite Duras	1975	28th Festival		France	Helena Wittmann	Online screening
Perfumed Nightmare	Kidlat Tahimik	1977	30th Festival		Philippines	Véréna Paravel, Lucien Castaing-Taylor	Online screening
E Nachtlang Füürland	Clemens Klopfenstein, Remo Legnazzi	1981	34th Festival		Switzerland	Michael Koch	Online and physical screening
Stranger Than Paradise	Jim Jarmusch	1984	37th Festival	Grand Prix Pardo d'oro, Grand Prix of the City of Locarno, Ecumenical and Youth Jury Special Mentions	USA, Federal Republic of Germany	Marí Alessandrini	Online and physical screening
The Terrorizers	Edward Yang	1986	40th Festival	Special Jury Grand Prix, Pardo d'argento, Second Prize of the City of Locarno	Taiwan	Eric Baudelaire	Online screening
O Bobo	José Álvaro Morais	1987	40th Festival	Grand Prix Pardo d'oro, Grand Prix of the City of Locarno and CICAE Jury Prize	Portugal	Miguel Gomes	Online screening
The Seventh Continent	Michael Haneke	1989	42nd Festival	Pardo di bronzo, Ernest Artaria Prize, Fourth Prize of the City of Locarno	Austria	Lav Diaz	Online and physical screening
Metropolitan	Whit Stillman	1990	43rd Festival	Pardo d'argento, Special Jury Grand Prix and Second Prize of the City of Locarno	USA	Axelle Ropert	Online and physical screening
Rapado	Martín Rejtman	1992	45th Festival		Argentina, Netherlands	Lucrecia Martel	Online screening
Au Nom du Christ	Roger Gnoan M'Bala	1993	46th Festival	Youth Jury "Environment is Quality of Life Prize"	Ivory Coast, Switzerland	Mohammed Soudani	Online and physical screening
A Moment of Innocence	Mohsen Makhmalbaf	1996	49th Festival	Youth Jury Second Prize "Nouveau Cinéma" and Official's Jury Special Mention	Iran, France	Miko Revereza	Online screening
Horse Money	Pedro Costa	2014	67th Festival	Pardo for Best Director	Portugal	Wang Bing	Online screening
No Home Movie	Chantal Akerman	2015	68th Festival		Belgium, France	Cyril Schäublin	Online screening
M	Yolande Zauberman	2018	71st Festival	Special Jury Prize and Youth Jury "Environment is Quality of Life" Prize	France	Elie Grappe	Online and physical screening

=== Leopards of Tomorrow (Pardi di domani) ===
==== International competition (Concorso internazionale) ====
Highlighted title indicates winner

English title	Original title	Director(s)	Production country
1978		Hamza Bangash	Pakistan
An Act of Affection		Viet Vu	Portugal/Vietnam
Red Aninsri; or, Tiptoeing on the Still Trembling Berlin Wall	Aninsri Daeng	Ratchapoom Boonbunchachoke	Thailand
Bethlehem 2001		Ibrahim Handal	Palestine
Digital Funeral: Beta Version		Sorayos Prapapan	Thailand
Aboring Film	Ekti Ekgheye Film	Mahde Hasan	Bangladesh
Fish Bowl		Ngabo Emmanuel	Rwanda
The Unseen River	Giòng Sông Không Nhìn Thấy	Phạm Ngọc Lân	Vietnam/Laos
Gramercy		Pat Heywood, Jamil McGinnis	USA
Here, Here		Joanne Cesario	Philippines
History of Civilization		Zhannat Alshanova	Kazakhstan
I Ran from It and Was Still in It		Darol Olu Kae	USA
Icemeltland Park		Liliana Colombo	Italy/United Kingdom
How I Beat Glue and Bronze	Kako Sam Pobedio Lepak i Bronzu	Vladimir Vulević	Serbia/Germany
Life on the Horn		Mo Harawe	Somalia/Austria/Germany
Memby		Rafael Castanheira Parrode	Brazil
Noor	Nour	Rim Nakhli	Tunisia
O Black Hole!		Renee Zhan	United Kingdom
Pacífico Oscuro		Camila Beltrán	France/Colombia
Land Lot S7	Parcelles S7	Abtin Sarabi	Senegal/Iran/France
Play Schengen		Gunhild Enger	Norway
Return to Toyama	Retour à Toyama	Atsushi Hirai	France/Japan
Spotted Yellow	Zarde Khaldar	Baran Sarmad	Iran
The Parallel State	Statul Paralel	Octav Chelaru	Romania
Break	Szünet	Levente Kölcsey	Hungary
Cloud of the Unknown	Tacong An Chu Lai	Gao Yuan	China
The Chicken		Neo Sora	USA
The End of Suffering (A Proposal)	The End of Suffering	Jacqueline Lentzou	Greece
A Trip to Heaven	Thiên Đường Gọi Tên	Linh Duong	Vietnam/Singapore
Thoughts on the Purpose of Friendship	Charlie Hillhouse	Australia	
Where to Land		Sawandi Groskind	Finland

==== National competition (Concorso nazionale) ====
Highlighted title indicates winner

English title	Original title	Director(s)	Production country
Bugs		David Shongo	Democratic Republic of the Congo/Switzerland
Ecorce (Peel)	Ecorce	Samuel Patthey, Silvain Monney	Switzerland
Spirits and Rocks: An Azorean Myth	Espíritos e Rochas	Aylin Gökmen	Switzerland/Portugal/Belgium/Hungary
Burnt. Land of Fire	Grigio. Terra Bruciata	Ben Donateo	Switzerland/Italy
Salmon Men	Lachsmänner	Veronica L. Mona Montaño, Manuela Leuenberger, Joel Hofmann	Switzerland
Megamall		Aline Schoch	Switzerland
People on Saturday	Menschen am Samstag	Jonas Ulrich	Switzerland
Nha Mila		Denise Fernandes	Portugal/Switzerland
Push This Button If You Begin to Panic		Gabriel Böhmer	United Kingdom/Switzerland
The De Facto Martyr Suite		Justine de Gasquet	Switzerland
Trou Noir (Black Hole)	Trou Noir	Tristan Aymon	Switzerland
Um Tordo Batendo Asas Contra o Vento (A Thrush Flapping Its Wings Against the Wind)	Um Tordo Batendo Asas Contra o Vento	Alexandre Haldemann	Switzerland

=== Open Doors Screenings - Features ===
English title	Original title	Director(s)	Production country
Apparition	Aparisyon	Isabel Sandoval	Philippines/USA
Atambua 39 °Celsius		Riri Riza	Indonesia
Clash	Engkwentro	Pepe Diokno	Philippines
Memories of My Body	Kucumbu Tubuh Indahku	Garin Nugroho	Indonesia
Sell Out!		Yeo Joon Han	Malaysia
Six Degrees of Separation from Lilia Cuntapay		Antoinette Jadaone	Philippines
Songlap		Effendee Mazlan, Fariza Azlina Isahak	Malaysia
Tender Are the Feet		Maung Wunna	Myanmar
The Masseur	Masahista	Brillante Mendoza	Philippines
What They Don't Talk About When They Talk About Love		Mouly Surya	Indonesia

=== Open Doors Screenings - Shorts ===
English title	Original Title	Director(s)	Production Country
A Gift	Kado	Aditya Ahmad	Indonesia
Babylon		Keith Deligero	Philippines
High Way		Chia Chee Sum	Malaysia
Liar Land		Ananth Subramaniam	Malaysia
Listen		Min Min Hein	Myanmar/USA/Japan
Man of Pa-aling	Manong ng Pa-aling	E del Mundo	Philippines/USA
No One Is Crazy in This Town	Tak Ada Yang Gila di Kota Ini	Wregas Bhanuteja	Indonesia
On Friday Noon		Luhki Herwanayogi	Indonesia
The Ruby		Ling Low	Malaysia
Void		Mg Bhone	Myanmar

== Official Awards ==
The following awards were presented for films shown in competition:

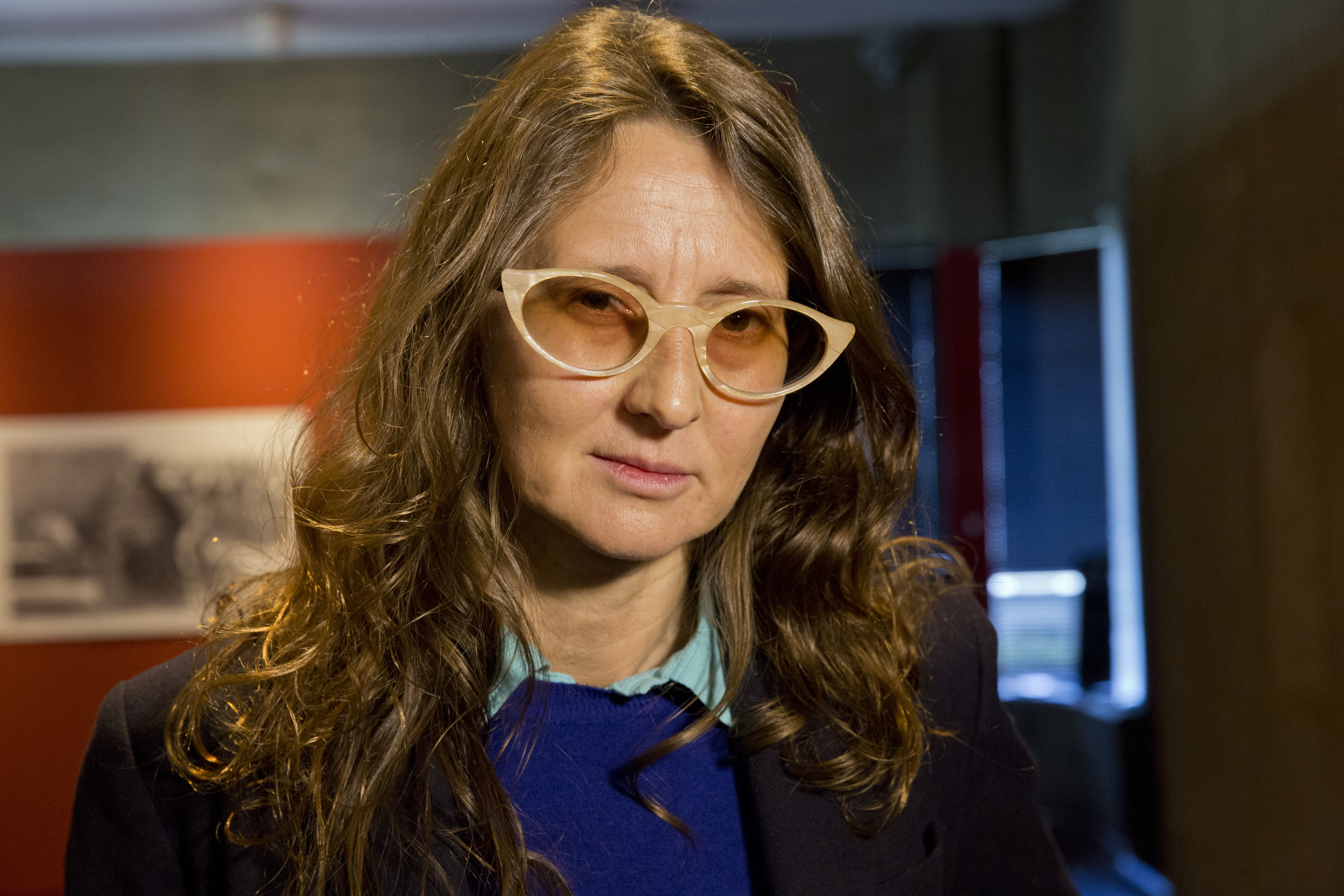
Lucrecia Martel winner of Pardo 2020 Best International Project

=== The Films After Tomorrow ===
==== International Selection ====
- Pardo 2020 for the Best International Project: Chocobar by Lucrecia Martel, Argentina/USA/Denmark/Mexico
- Campari Award Special Jury Prize: SELVAJARIA (Savagery) by Miguel Gomes, Portugal/France/Brazil/China/Greece
- Swatch Award for the Most Innovative Project: DE HUMANI CORPORIS FABRICA (The Fabric of the Human Body) by Verena Paravel and Lucien Castaing-Taylor

==== Swiss Selection ====
- Pardo 2020 for the Best Swiss Project: ZAHORÍ by Marí Alessandrini, Switzerland/Argentina/Chile/France
- SRG SSR Award: LUX by Raphaël Dubach and Mateo Ybarra, Switzerland

=== Pardi di Domani ===
==== International Competition ====
- Pardino d'oro SRG SSR for the Best International Short Film: I RAN FROM IT AND WAS STILL IN IT by Darol Olu Kae, USA
- Pardino d'argento SRG SSR for an International Short Film: HISTORY OF CIVILIZATION by Zhannat Alshanova, Kazakhstan
- Medien Patent Verwaltung AG Prize: THIÊN ĐƯỜNG GỌI TÊN (A Trip to Heaven) by Linh Duong, Vietnam/Singapore
- Special Mention: LIFE ON THE HORN by Mo Harawe, Somalia/Austria/Germany

==== Swiss Competition ====
- Pardino d'oro Swiss Life for the Best Swiss Short Film: MENSCHEN AM SAMSTAG (People on Saturday) by Jonas Ulrich, Switzerland (Locarno Short Film Candidate for the European Film Awards)
- Pardino d'argento Swiss Life for a Swiss Short Film: TROU NOIR (Black Hole) by Tristan Aymon, Switzerland
- Best Swiss Newcomer Prize: LACHSMÄNNER (Salmon Men) by Veronica L. Montaño, Manuela Leuenberger, Joel Hofmann, Switzerland

=== Cinema&Gioventù Jury ===
==== The Films After Tomorrow ====
- Prize for Best International Project: CIDADE; CAMPO by Juliana Rojas, Brazil
- Prize for Best Swiss Project: AZOR by Andreas Fontana, Switzerland/France/Argentina
- "Environment is Quality of Life" Prize: EUREKA by Lisandro Alonso, France/Portugal/Germany/Mexico/Argentina

==== Pardi di Domani Prize ====
- Best International Short Film: ANINSRI DAENG (Red Aninsri; or, Tiptoeing on the Still Trembling Berlin Wall) by Ratchapoom Boonbunchachoke, Thailand
- Best Swiss Short Film: TROU NOIR (Black Hole) by Tristan Aymon, Switzerland

=== Open Doors Screenings ===
==== Short Films - Open Doors Screenings ====
- Prize for Best Short Film: KADO (A Gift) by Aditya Ahmad, Indonesia
- Special Mention: LIAR LAND by Ananth Subramaniam, Malaysia

==== Long Films- Open Doors Screenings ====
- "Environment is Quality of Life" Prize for Best Full-Length Feature: SELL OUT! by Yeo Joon Han, Malaysia
- Special Mention: ENGKWENTRO (Clash) by Pepe Diokno, Philippines
