= Thomas Foguenne =

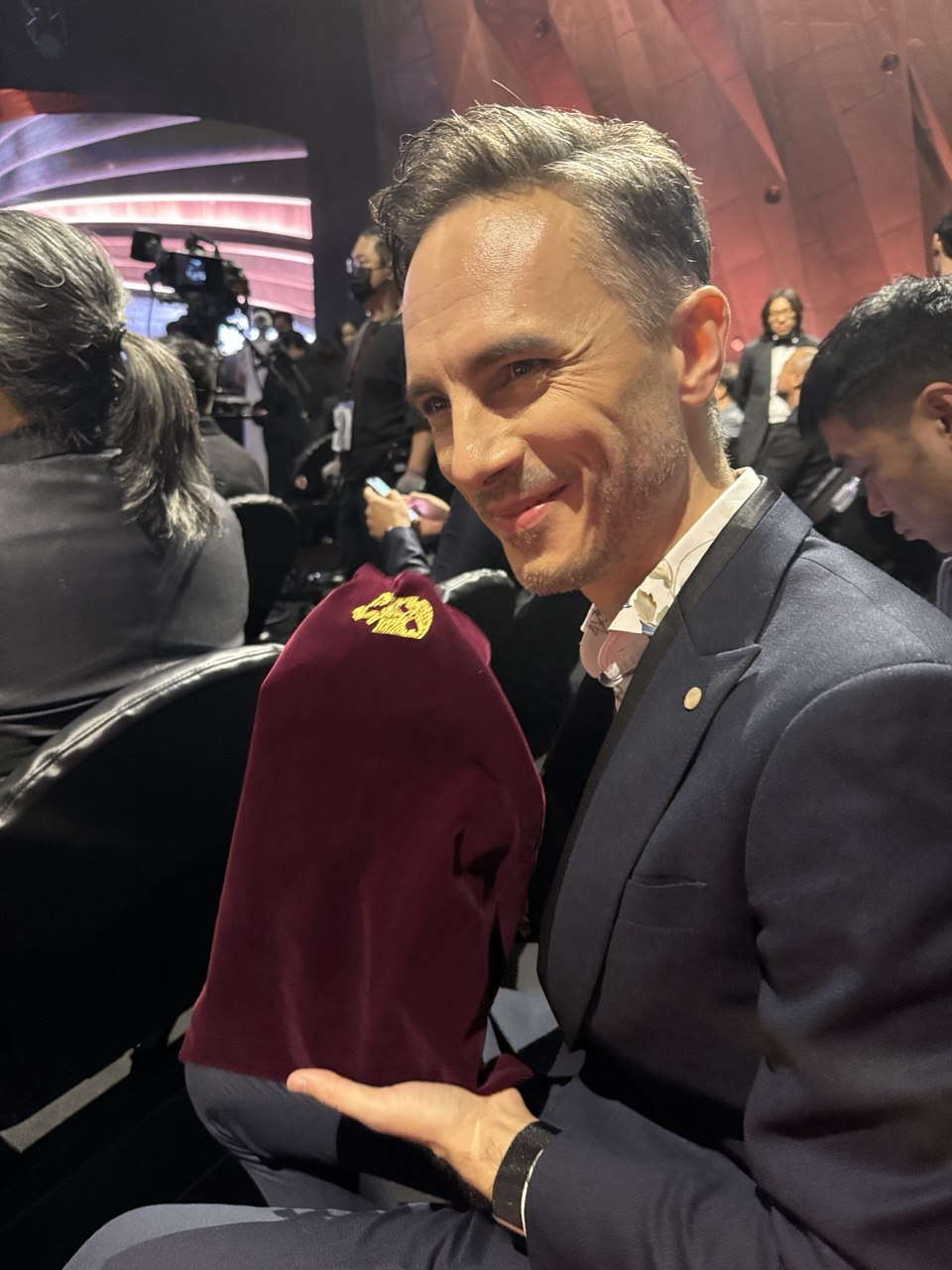
- Foguenne during the 2024 Golden Horse Award in Taipei

Background information
- Born: July 25, 1980 (age 46); Namur, Belgium.
- Genres: Film scores, soundtracks
- Occupations: Composer, teacher
- Instrument: Piano
- Years active: 2006–present
- Website: www.thomasfoguenne.com

Thomas Foguenne (Chinese: 福多瑪; born 25 July 1980) is a Belgian-Taiwanese composer and pianist. He is known for his film scores for Stranger Eyes (2024), Three Tears in Borneo (2024) and Trouble Girl (2023).

Foguenne won the Golden Horse Award for Best Original Film Score for Stranger Eyes at the 61st Golden Horse Awards in 2024. He has also received two Golden Bell Awards, a Golden Harvest Award and a Taipei Film Festival Award.

His film work also includes We Are All Strangers (2026), directed by Anthony Chen, for which he shares the music credit with Singaporean composer Kin Leonn.

Foguenne studied composition, piano, chamber music and harmony at the Royal Conservatory of Mons, where he also studied orchestral conducting and electroacoustic music. He teaches music analysis, classical composition, and applied and interactive music composition at Arts² in Mons, Belgium.

== Career ==
After initially working as a contemporary music composer, Foguenne left music for several years to pursue a career in culinary arts before returning to composition and turning increasingly towards film scoring. He subsequently developed much of his career in Taiwan, where he became established as a film composer and collaborated with Taiwanese filmmakers on feature films, documentaries and television productions.

Among his early Taiwanese film credits were Black Sheep (2016), Blood Amber (2017), The Last Verse (2017) and Upstream (2017).

His work subsequently expanded across Taiwanese and international productions. In 2023 he received his first Golden Horse Award nomination for Trouble Girl, followed in 2024 by the Golden Horse Award for Best Original Film Score for Yeo Siew Hua's Stranger Eyes, which premiered in competition at the Venice Film Festival.

Foguenne continues to work between Europe and Asia. His recent credits include The Waves Will Carry Us, Slave Island and Anthony Chen's We Are All Strangers, for which he shares the music credit with Singaporean composer Kin Leonn. The film was selected for the Berlin International Film Festival in 2026.

== Filmography ==
=== Film ===
Year	Title	Director(s)	Notes
2026	We Are All Strangers	Anthony Chen	Music co-written with Kin Leonn.
2025	The Waves Will Carry Us	Lau Kek-huat	Original title: 人生海海. Nominated for Best Original Film Score at the 62nd Golden Horse Awards.
2025	Under the Same Boat	Chang Ming-yu	Documentary. Original title: 同一條船下.
2024	Stranger Eyes	Yeo Siew Hua	Original title: 默視錄. Won Best Original Film Score at the 61st Golden Horse Awards and Best Score at the Taipei Film Awards.
2023	Trouble Girl	Chia-hua Chin (靳家驊)	Original title: 小曉. Nominated for Best Original Film Score at the 60th Golden Horse Awards.
2023	Who'll Stop the Rain	I-Hsuan Su (蘇奕瑄)	Original title: 青春並不溫柔.
2022	Ballet in Tandem	Wei-Hsin Yang (楊偉新)	Documentary. Original title: 舞徑.
2021	Green Jail	Yin-Yu Huang (黃胤毓)	Documentary. Original title: 綠色牢籠. Nominated for Best Score at the Taipei Film Awards.
2021	The Bad Man	Yong-chao Lee (李永超)	Documentary. Original title: 惡人之煞.
2021	The Piano Lesson	Hsu Yung-chih (徐湧智)	Short film. Original title: 鋼琴課. Nominated for Best Score at the Taipei Film Awards.
2017	Blood Amber	Yong-chao Lee (李永超)	Original title: 血琥珀.
2016	The Fool and the Temple	Yingjie Cui (崔英杰)	Original title: 保守之地.

=== Television ===
Year	Title	Director(s)	Notes
2024	Three Tears in Borneo	Jie-heng Sun	Television series. Original title: 聽海湧. Nominated for Best Music at the 60th Golden Bell Awards.
2022	Marriage no.1314	Wen-tang Cheng	Television film. Original title: 尾號1314. Opening film of the Kaohsiung Film Festival.
2018	The Defender	Shih-Han Tsao (曹仕翰)	Television film. Original title: 無法辯護.
2017	Their Heaven	Chien-Hung Lien (練建宏)	Television film. Original title: TMD天堂. Five nominations at the 52nd Golden Bell Awards.
2017	Upstream	David Chuang (莊絢維)	Television film. Original title: 濁流. Five nominations and one award at the 52nd Golden Bell Awards; selected for the international competition at the Montreal World Film Festival.
2017	The Last Verse	Ying-Ting Tseng (曾英庭)	Television film. Original title: 最後的詩句. Eight nominations and four awards at the 52nd Golden Bell Awards; selected for the Busan International Film Festival and Toronto Reel Asian International Film Festival.
2016	The Cat in the Closet	Ying-Ting Tseng (曾英庭)	Television film. Original title: 衣櫃裡的貓. Won Best Sound at the 51st Golden Bell Awards.

== Discography ==
=== Soundtrack albums ===
Year	Title	Associated production	Notes
2023	Who'll Stop the Rain	Who'll Stop the Rain (film)	Original soundtrack
2024	Trouble Girl	Trouble Girl (film)	Original motion picture soundtrack
2024	Ballet in Tandem	Ballet in Tandem (film)	Original motion picture soundtrack
2024	Three Tears in Borneo	Three Tears in Borneo (television miniseries)	Original series soundtrack
2025	Stranger Eyes	Stranger Eyes (film)	Original motion picture soundtrack
2026	The Waves Will Carry Us	The Waves Will Carry Us (film)	Original motion picture soundtrack
2026	We Are All Strangers	We Are All Strangers (film)	Original motion picture soundtrack; co-composed with Kin Leonn
