= Baby (2024 film) =

2024 film

- Theatrical release poster
- Directed by: Marcelo Caetano
- Written by: Marcelo Caetano; Gabriel Domingues
- Produced by: Ivan Melo; Roberto Tibiriçá; Juliette Lepoutre; Stienette Bookslopper; John Baars; Marcelo Caetano
- Starring: João Pedro Mariano; Ricardo Teodoro; Ana Flavia Cavalcanti; Bruna Linzmeyer; Luiz Bertazzo
- Cinematography: Joana Luz; Pedro Sotero
- Edited by: Fabian Remy
- Music by: Bruno Prado; Caê Rolfsen
- Production companies: Cup Filmes; Plateau Produções; Still Moving; Circe; Kaap Holland Film; Desbun Filmes
- Distributed by: Dark Star Pictures; Uncork’d Entertainment
- Release dates: 21 May 2024 (Cannes); 9 January 2025 (Brazil)
- Running time: 106 minutes
- Countries: Brazil; France; Netherlands
- Language: Portuguese

Baby is a 2024 drama film, directed by Marcelo Caetano. A co-production between Brazil, France and the Netherlands, the film stars João Pedro Mariano as Wellington (nicknamed "Baby"), a young man forced to fend for himself on the streets of São Paulo. Newly released from a two-year stint in juvenile detention, during which his parents moved away without leaving any indication of their whereabouts, he meets the older Ronaldo (Ricardo Teodoro), an escort who becomes first a substitute father figure and then a love interest for Baby.

The cast also includes Ana Flavia Cavalcanti as Ronaldo's former partner, Priscila, and Bruna Linzmeyer as Priscila's wife Jana, who also build friendships with Wellington, and Luiz Bertazzo as Torres, a drug dealer who also wants Wellington's affections, as well as Marcelo Várzea, Patrick Coelho, Kyra Reis, Baco Pereira, Sylvia Prado, Ariane Aparecida, Victor Hugo Martins, Maurício de Barros, Cleo Coelho, Cael Benício, Aquiles, Kelly Campello and Mauricio Sassi in supporting roles.

== Distribution ==
The film premiered on 18 May 2024 in the Critics Week program at the 2024 Cannes Film Festival, where it was a nominee for the Queer Palm. It has been acquired by Dark Star Pictures and Uncork’d Entertainment for North American commercial distribution. Distribution for the UK and Republic of Ireland is via Peccadillo Pictures.

== Reception ==
On review aggregator website Rotten Tomatoes, the film holds an approval rating of 100% based on 14 reviews.
