= Don't Cry, Butterfly =

2024 fantasy comedy film by Dương Diệu Linh

- Poster
- Directed by: Dương Diệu Linh
- Written by: Dương Diệu Linh
- Produced by: Trần Thị Bích Ngọc; Nguyễn Mai Ka; Tan Si En; Wilfredo Cruz Manalang; Yulia Evina Bhara; Des Tan; Alicia Catubay-Watt; George K. Sommerrock; Nathaniel Lee; Madonna B. Sanchez
- Starring: Tú Oanh; Nguyễn Nam Linh; Lê Vũ Long; Bùi Thạc Phong
- Cinematography: Ngô Minh Nghĩa
- Edited by: Daniel Hui
- Music by: Diego Ayala Raffalli
- Production companies: Kalei Films; Momo Film Co; Adeline Arts & Science; Fusee; Potato Productions; KawanKawan Media; Pupa Films; Ân Nam Productions
- Distributed by: CJ CGV (Vietnam)
- Release dates: 3 September 2024 (Venice); 3 January 2025 (Vietnam)
- Running time: 97 minutes 95 minutes (Vietnam)
- Countries: Vietnam; Philippines; Singapore; Indonesia
- Language: Vietnamese

Don't Cry, Butterfly (Vietnamese: Mưa trên cánh bướm) is a 2024 fantasy comedy film written and directed by Dương Diệu Linh in her directorial debut. An international co-production between Vietnam, the Philippines, Singapore, and Indonesia, the film had its world premiere at the 81st Venice International Film Festival during the International Critics' Week section.

== Premise ==
A housewife uses voodoo to lure her husband back after finding out about his affair.

== Cast ==
- Tú Oanh as Tâm
- Nguyễn Nam Linh as Hà
- Lê Vũ Long as Mr. Thành
- Bùi Thạc Phong as Trọng

== Production ==
In August 2019, Dương Diệu Linh won the Open Doors – Moulin d'Andé-CECI Award during the Open Doors Hub and Lab at the Locarno Film Festival for creating the premise for the development of the project. In January 2022, the project was shortlisted for the Talent Project Market at the Berlinale Talents 2022 during the Berlin International Film Festival. In March 2022, the project won two awards, Wouter Barendrecht Award and Udine Focus Asian Award at the Hong Kong – Asian Film Financing Forum.

Principal photography took place in September 2023.

== Release ==
Don't Cry, Butterfly had its world premiere at the 81st Venice International Film Festival on 3 September 2024 during the International Critics' Week section. It won two awards, IWONDERFULL Grand Prize and Most Innovative Feature. The film was also screened at film festivals in Busan, Toronto, and London.

== Accolades ==
Award / Film Festival	Date of ceremony	Category	Recipient(s)	Result	Ref.
Venice International Film Festival	7 September 2024	IWONDERFULL Grand Prize	Don't Cry, Butterfly	Won	
Venice International Film Festival	7 September 2024	Most Innovative Feature	Don't Cry, Butterfly	Won	
QCinema International Film Festival	13 November 2024	Asian Next Wave – Grand Jury Prize	Don't Cry, Butterfly	Won	
Golden Horse Awards	23 November 2024	NETPAC Award	Don't Cry, Butterfly	Nominated	
