= Tomorrow Is a Long Time (film) =

2023 drama film by Jow Zhi Wei

- Promotional poster
- Traditional Chinese: 明天比昨天長久
- Simplified Chinese: 明天比昨天长久
- Hanyu Pinyin: Míng tiān bǐ zuó tiān cháng jiǔ
- Directed by: Jow Zhi Wei
- Screenplay by: Jow Zhi Wei
- Produced by: Fran Borgia; Jeremy Chua; Stefano Centini; Xavier Rocher; Ico Costa
- Starring: Leon Dai; Edward Tan; Jay Victor; Julius Foo; Lekheraj Sekhar; Harry Nayan; Neo Swee Lin
- Cinematography: Russell Morton
- Edited by: Alexandra Strauss
- Music by: Ting Si Hao
- Production companies: Akanga Film Asia; Potocol; Volos Films; La Fabrica Nocturna Cinema; Oublaum Filmes
- Distributed by: Anticipate Pictures (Singapore)
- Release dates: 18 February 2023 (Berlin); December 2023 (SGIFF)
- Running time: 106 minutes
- Countries: Singapore; Taiwan; France; Portugal
- Languages: Mandarin; English

Tomorrow Is a Long Time (Chinese: 明天比昨天长久) is a 2023 internationally co-produced drama film written and directed by Jow Zhi Wei. Principal photography began in end 2021 with filming taking place in Singapore and Taiwan. The film premiered as part of the Generation 14plus selection of the 73rd Berlin International Film Festival, in which it is the first time a Singaporean feature film has been selected to screen in the section.

== Synopsis ==
A widowed pest exterminator and his sensitive teenage son struggle with social and economic pressures which eventually leads to violent repercussions.

== Cast ==
- Leon Dai as Chua
- Edward Tan as Meng
- Jay Victor as Soe
- Julius Foo as Lee
- Lekheraj Sekhar as Kishod
- Harry Nayan as Harry
- Neo Swee Lin as Wan

== Production ==
Tomorrow Is a Long Time took seven years to develop and complete, with filming taking place in industrial zones in Singapore and in forested areas in Taiwan. Auditions for the role of Meng took around two years and newcomer Edward Tan was selected from 250 candidates to play the role.
