= Narges Kalhor =

Iranian film director (born 1984)

Narges Kalhor (born September 10, 1984 in Tehran) is an Iranian film director. She is the daughter of Mehdi Kalhor, the former media and cultural advisor to former President of Iran Mahmoud Ahmadinejad. She studied Film at the Beh-andish College in Teheran and has produced films critical of the Iranian government.

In October 2009, while visiting Germany to present her short film "Die Egge" at the Nuremberg Film Festival, Kalhor applied for political asylum in Germany, claiming to have received warnings that she could be in danger if she returns to Iran because of her critical stance on her country.

Kalhor actively participated in the 2009 Iranian election protests.

Together with Benedikt Schwarzer, she co-directed the short documentary SHOOT ME, which is nominated for the German Short Film Award 2014.

== Filmografie ==
- 2001: Without Discussion
- 2002: Illusions of a Persian Cat
- 2007: Enlightenment of a Hen
- 2007: We Must Have Died
- 2008: Die Egge
- 2008: Hair
- 2009: After Green
- 2009: Bijan And Manigeh In Tehran
- 2011: Munich - Tehran
- 2013: SHOOT ME
- 2014: Kafan
- 2014: Lavashak
- 2024: Shahid
