= Ratchapoom Boonbunchachoke =

Thai film director

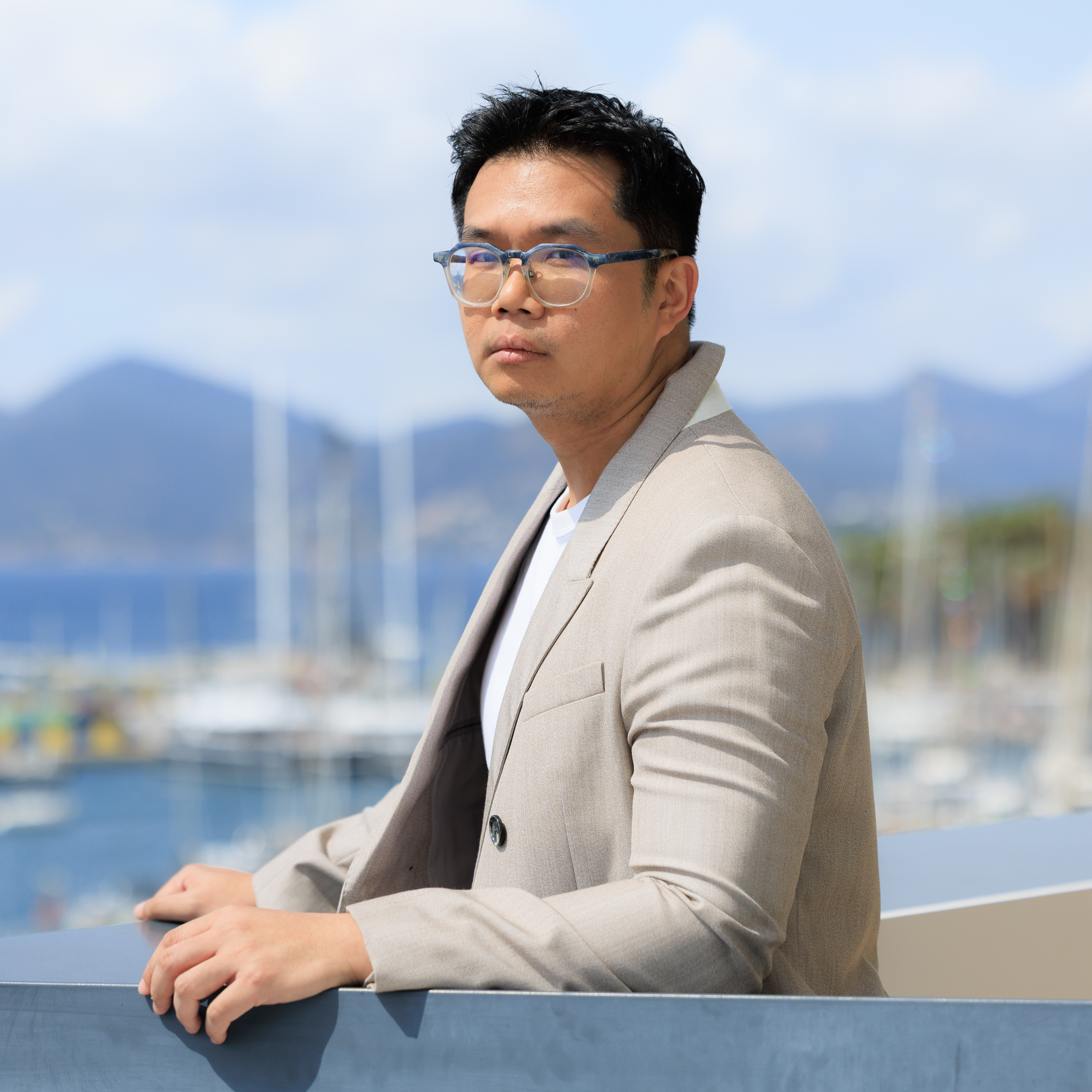
- Boonbunchachoke in 2025
- Born: Bangkok, Thailand
- Occupations: Film director, screenwriter
- Years active: 2010s–present

Ratchapoom Boonbunchachoke is a Thai film director and screenwriter of Teochew-Hainanese descent, whose debut feature film A Useful Ghost was released in 2025. He also teaches film theory and screenwriting classes in Bangkok.

Born and raised in Bangkok, he studied film at Chulalongkorn University. His short film Red Aninsri; Or, Tiptoeing on the Still Trembling Berlin Wall won the Youth Jury Award in the Pardi di Domani competition at the Locarno 2020 Film Festival.

He began writing A Useful Ghost in 2017, partially as an indirect metaphor for the political environment of Thailand following the 2014 Thai coup d'état. The film, a dark comedy-drama in which a deceased woman's spirit possesses a vacuum cleaner was inspired by the 19th century Thai legend of Mae Nak. It had its world premiere in the Critics' Week section of the 2025 Cannes Film Festival, winning the Grand Prize.

It was submitted as the Thai entry for Best International Feature Film at the 98th Academy Awards, although it was disqualified due to submission errors by the production studio.

Boonbunchachoke sees his work as a continuation of both traditional Thai melodrama and fabulism. He lists among his greatest influences Jacques Rivette, Manoel de Oliveira, João César Monteiro, Eugène Green, Raoul Ruiz, Otar Iosseliani, Werner Schroeter and Marco Ferreri. Boonbunchachoke's films have been praised for their representation of LGBTQ people.

== Filmography ==
| Year | Title | Director | Writer | Producer | Ref(s). |
|---|---|---|---|---|---|
| 2020 | Red Aninsri; Or, Tiptoeing on the Still Trembling Berlin Wall | Yes | Yes | Yes | |
| 2025 | A Useful Ghost | Yes | Yes | No | |

== Awards and nominations ==
| Year | Association | Category | Nominated work | Result | Ref(s). |
|---|---|---|---|---|---|
| 2020 | Locarno Film Festival | Best International Short Film (Pardi di Domani Youth Jury) | Red Aninsri; Or, Tiptoeing on the Still Trembling Berlin Wall | Won | |
| 2025 | Cannes Film Festival | Critics' Week Grand Prize | A Useful Ghost | Won | |
| 2025 | Festival du nouveau cinéma | Fierté Montréal Prize | A Useful Ghost | Won | |
| 2025 | Sitges Film Festival | Best Screenplay | A Useful Ghost | Won | |
| 2025 | Sitges Film Festival | Citizen Kane Award (Best New Director) | A Useful Ghost | Won | |
