= Marcelo Caetano (director) =

Brazilian filmmaker (born 1982)

- Born: 1982 (age 43–44); Belo Horizonte, Brazil
- Occupations: Film director, screenwriter
- Years active: 2000s–present
- Known for: Body Electric (2017), Baby (2024)

Marcelo Caetano (born 1982) is a Brazilian film director and screenwriter, whose debut feature film Body Electric (Corpo Elétrico) was released in 2017.

== Career ==
Born and raised in Belo Horizonte, he moved to São Paulo in the early 2000s. He worked in film as a casting director, an assistant director and a contributing screenwriter on various films, and directed a number of short films, prior to Body Electric, which premiered in the Bright Future competition at the International Film Festival Rotterdam in 2017.

His second feature film, Baby, premiered in the Critics Week program at the 2024 Cannes Film Festival.

== Personal life ==
He is openly gay.

== Filmography ==
- A Tal Guerreira - 2008
- Bailão - 2009
- By Your Side (Na Sua Companhia) - 2011
- Verona - 2013
- Body Electric (Corpo Elétrico) - 2017
- Baby - 2024
