= Viet and Nam =

2024 romantic drama film

- Poster
- Vietnamese: Trong lòng đất
- Directed by: Trương Minh Quý
- Written by: Trương Minh Quý
- Produced by: Bradley Liew; Bianca Balbuena
- Starring: Thi Nga Nguyen; Daniel Viet Tung Le
- Cinematography: Son Doan
- Edited by: Félix Rehm
- Production companies: Epicmedia Productions; Cinema Inutile
- Release date: May 22, 2024 (Cannes)
- Running time: 129 minutes
- Countries: Philippines; Singapore; France; Netherlands; Italy; Germany; Vietnam; United States
- Language: Vietnamese

Viet and Nam (Vietnamese: Trong lòng đất, "Underground", Lit: "The Heart of the Earth"), also spelled Việt and Nam, is a 2024 romantic drama written and directed by Trương Minh Quý. Starring Thi Nga Nguyen and Daniel Viet Tung Le, the film is about two coal miners who are in love, cherishing fleeting moments before one seeks better economic opportunity abroad. Leading up to the departure, they also search for the body of one of their fathers, a fallen soldier. The film was banned in Viet Nam for allegedly giving “a gloomy, deadlocked, and negative view” of the country.

The film had its world premiere in the Un Certain Regard section of the 2024 Cannes Film Festival, where it was nominated for the Queer Palm. It made its North American premiere at the 49th Toronto International Film Festival in the Wavelengths programme, and was selected for the 62nd New York Film Festival in the Main Slate. It was also selected for the MAMI Mumbai Film Festival 2024 under the World Cinema section.

== Cast ==
- Thanh Hai Pham as Nam/Việt
- Duy Bao Dinh Dao as Nam /Việt
- Thi Nga Nguyen as Hoa
- Daniel Viet Tung Le as Ba

== Reception ==
=== Critical response ===
On the review aggregator website Rotten Tomatoes, 100% of 33 critics' reviews are positive. Metacritic, which uses a weighted average, assigned the film a score of 83 out of 100, based on 11 critics, indicating "universal acclaim".

=== Accolades ===
Award	Year	Category	Recipient(s)	Result	Ref.
Asia Pacific Screen Awards	2024	Best Cinematography	Son Doan	Nominated	
Cannes Film Festival	2024	Prix Un Certain Regard	Minh Quý Trương	Nominated	
Cannes Film Festival	2024	Queer Palm	Minh Quý Trương	Nominated	
Filmfest München	2024	CineRebels Award	Minh Quý Trương	Won	
QCinema International Film Festival	2024	Best Picture – Asian Next Wave Competition	Việt and Nam	Won	
Singapore International Film Festival	2024	Best Director	Minh Quý Trương	Won	
Singapore International Film Festival	2024	FIPRESCI Award	Việt and Nam	Won	
World Film Festival of Bangkok	2024	Jury Prize	Minh Quý Trương	Won	
