= Wishing on a Star (film) =

2024 film

- Directed by: Peter Kerekes
- Written by: Peter Kerekes; Erica Barbiani
- Produced by: Erica Barbiani; Lucia Candelpergher
- Starring: Luciana de Leoni D’Asparedo; Valentina Angeli; Alessandra Fornasier; Barbara Lutman; Giovanni Rugo; Adriana Vangone; Giuliana Vangone
- Cinematography: Martin Kollár
- Edited by: Marek Sulík
- Music by: Lucia Chutkova
- Release date: 31 August 2024 (Venice)
- Language: Italian

Wishing on a Star is a 2024 docudrama film co-written and directed by Peter Kerekes. A co-production between Italy, Croatia, Austria, Slovakia and Czech Republic, the film premiered at the 81st edition of the Venice Film Festival.

== Synopsis ==
The film follows Luciana de Leoni, a Neapolitan astrologer based in Aiello del Friuli, and several clients of hers. Most ask for her help in finding love, and more often that not, their family situation (in particular a dominant mother) gets in the way. Luciana’s method involves telling her clients that they can be ‘reborn’ and, for that purpose, sends them off on a ‘birthday trip’ to a location where the astral configurations are in their favor. Since these trips are often to remote locations such as New Zealand or Alaska, clients who cannot make this trip physically are told to do so in a ‘virtual’ way by recreating the atmosphere of their destination at home. At the same time, Luciana has decided to sell her house in Friuli and return to her native Naples.

== Production ==
The film was produced by Videomante, with KerekesFilm, Radio and Television Slovakia, Artcam Films, Mischief Films and Restart serving as co-producers. Development of the film started in 2019.

== Release ==
The film had its world premiere at the 81st Venice International Film Festival in the Orizzonti sidebar. It was later screened at numerous other festivals, including the 49th Toronto International Film Festival and the 28th Tallinn Black Nights Film Festival.

== Reception ==
Screen International's film critic Wendy Ide praised the film, describing it as "warm, eccentric and frequently amusing". Pat Mullen from POV Magazine referred to the film as "an offbeat journey that’s as open of heart as it is of mind".
