= QCinema International Film Festival =

Film festival in the Philippines

- Location: Quezon City, Philippines
- Founded: 2013
- Festival date: October or November
- Website: QCinema.ph

The QCinema International Film Festival is an annual film festival held in Quezon City, Philippines. The festival showcases local and international films, documentaries, and short films, and gives grants to their creators. As of 2017, the venues for the festival are Trinoma, Gateway Mall, Robinsons Galleria, and U.P. Town Center.

== History ==
The QCinema International Film Festival was created in 2013 by the Quezon City Film Development Foundation (QCFDC), a Quezon City governmental commission that supported the city's filmmakers. The Circle Competition was created for entrants to compete for their films to be shown at the film festival. Winners of the Circle Competition would be given a seed grant to help them produce more films.

The first festival was held from October 3 to October 5 of that year, with 3,000 people attending. Only three filmmakers reached the Circle Competition, each winning a seed grant of ₱800,000 (US $10,000~). Those filmes were Lukas Nino by John Torres, Hello World by Joel Ferrer and Gaydar by Alvin Yapan. Their films were selected for promoting nationalism, gender sensitivity, freedom, and excellence. Several films from "New Breed" category of the 2013 Cinemalaya Philippine Independent Film Festival were also shown.

In 2014 the festival was held from November 5 to 11, and reached an attendance of 5,000. Thirty-eight films were shown, out of which eight received grants. Film categories were introduced, with "Screen International" highlighting foreign films, and "Children's Classics" being films produced for children. The festival also featured a filmmakers’ forum.

In 2015 the festival was held from October 22 to 31, with 10,000 people attending. Sixty movies were shown throughout the festival, with eight receiving grants. The "Screen International" and "Children's Classics" categories returned, with the latter being renamed to "Special Children's Screening." New film categories included the "International Documentaries", "RainbowQC" (films about the LGBTQ community), "Music Genius" (films about music legends), "Special Halloween Screening", "Throwback Ticket" (digitally restored movies), "Indie Nacional" (homegrown award-winning films), "Reloaded" (films by previous Circle Competition winners), "QCX Anthology", and "Asian Cinerama" (films recognized as outstanding by the Asian Film Awards Academy).

QCinema has continued to expand and grow. In 2024, grant recipients in 2024 include:

- Viet and Nam by Truong Minh Quy (Asian Next Wave, Best Picture)
- Don't Cry, Butterfly by Dương Diệu Linh (Asian Next Wave, Grand Jury Prize)
- Elizabeth Lo for Mistress Dispeller (Asian Next Wave, Best Director)
- John Lloyd Cruz for Moneyslapper, and Shenina Cinnamon for Tale of the Land (Asian Next Wave, Best Lead Performance)
- Happyend by Neo Sora (Asian Next Wave, Best Screenplay)
- Marcus Cheng and Hsu Kuei-Ting for Pierce (Asian Next Wave, Artistic Achievement Award)
- Kinakausap ni Celso ang Diyos by Gilb Baldoza (QC Shorts International, Best Short Film)
- Are We Still Friends? by Al Ridwan (QC Shorts International, Special Mention)
- Washhh by Mickey Lai (QC Shorts International, Jury Prize)
- Rampage! (O Ang Parada) by Kukay Bautista Zinampan (Gender Sensitivity Award)
- Toxic by Saulė Bliuvaitė (New Horizons Prize for Best First Film)
- Cu Li Never Cries by Pham Ngoc Lan (Netpac Jury Price for Best Asian First Film)
- Sebastian by Mikko Mäkelä and Baby by Marcelo Caetano (RainbowQC Prize for Best LGBTQ Film)
- My Sunshine by Hiroshi Okuyama (Special Mention RainbowQC Prize)
- Kinakausap ni Celso ang Diyos by Gilb Baldoza and Here We Are by Chanasorn Chaikitiporn (QCinema Critics Lab Young Critics Prize)

In 2025, QCinema announced that it would expand RainbowQC from a section into a full film festival, called RainbowQC Pride Film Festival, focusing exclusively on LGBTQIA+ film content. The new festival took place from June 25-27, 2025 to correspond with Pride Month.

== Programs ==
As of 2026, the festival has nine main programs or sections:

Main Competition sections

- Asian Next Wave – focuses on films of emerging filmmakers from Southeast Asia and East Asia with less than three features
- New Horizon – showcases directors and their debuts and second features
- RainbowQC – feature and short films on LGBTQ+
- QCShorts International – short films from Southeast Asia

Exhibition sections

- Screen International – award-winning critically-acclaimed films from all over the world
- QC Selects – a selection of films suited for everyone
- Rediscovery – digitally restored films
- Before Midnight – horror and thriller films
- Dokyu Days - documentaries from all over the world

Discontinued sections

- Contemporary Italian Cinema – Co-presented by the Italian Embassy and the Asian Film Festival, Rome
- QCLokal – new works by Filipino filmmakers
- QCShorts Expo – shorts films outside Southeast Asia

== See also ==
- List of film festivals
- Cinema of the Philippines
