= Brauen =

Brauen is a surname. Notable people with the surname include:

- Martin Brauen (born 1948), Swiss ethnologist
- Sonam Dolma Brauen (born 1953), Tibetan-Swiss painter and sculptor
- Yangzom Brauen (born 1980), Tibetan-Swiss actress, writer and director
