= Brushal =

Region inhabited by Burusho people

Brushal is the region inhabited by the Burusho people, corresponding to the valleys of Hunza-Nagar, Yasin, and historically, Gilgit. Along with Baltistan and Shinaki, inhabited by the Balti and Shin people respectively, it is one of the three ethno-geographic regions in Gilgit-Baltistan.

The Tibetan sources refer to the region as "Bru-zha" or "Brusha". The name appears as such in these sources as early as in the 7th century CE, when the king of Tibet married a Bru-za princess. A. H. Dani identifies Brushal with the little Balor mentioned in the pre-Islamic and Islamic sources. Brushal was the name of a much larger region in past then the present extent of Brushaski speakers. According to Karl Jettmar Brushal in earlier sources referred to the Gilgit Valley when it was still under occupation of Burusho people, before they were displaced by the incoming Shins, in sometimes about 10th century CE. Kreutzmann suggests that Brushal was the name with which northern neighbours of Burusho people, such as Chitral, knew their country while the eastern neighbours in Kashmir, Ladakh and Baltistan called the region as "Kanjut". According to him the two terms are "to be considered coterminous", and refer to the same region, the Hunza-Nagir valleys.

== Sources ==
- Dani, Ahmad Hasan (1991) [1989]. "Historical Geography". History of Northern Areas of Pakistan (2nd ed.). Islamabad: National Institute of Historical and Cultural Research, Quaid-i-Azam University. ISBN 978-969-415-016-1.
- Kazmi, Abbas (1993). "The Ethnic Groups of Baltistan". In Ramble, Charles; Brauen, Martin (eds.). Proceedings of the International Seminar on the Anthropology of Tibet and the Himalaya: September 21–28 1990 at the Ethnographic Museum of the University of Zurich. Völkerkundemuseum der Universität Zürich. pp. 158–164. ISBN 978-3-909105-24-3.
- Jettmar, Karl (1980). Bolor and Dardistan. Islamabad: National Institute of Folk Heritage. OCLC 15812986.
- Kreutzmann, Hermann (2006). Karakoram in Transition: Culture, Development and Ecology in the Hunza Valley. Karachi: Oxford University Press. ISBN 978-0-19-547210-3.
