= Muhamed Hevaji Uskufi Bosnevi =

Bosnian poet & writer

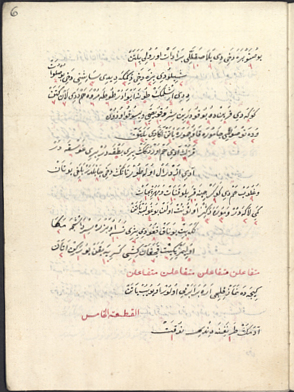
- Bosnian language dictionary written by Uskufi in 1631 using Arebica script.
- Born: 1601; Tuzla, Bosnia Eyalet, Ottoman Empire
- Died: after 1651
- Occupation: Writer
- Writing career
- Language: Bosnian, Turkish and Arabic
- Notable work: Makbul-i arif

Muhamed Hevaji Uskufi Bosnevi (Turkish: Mehmet Hevayi Uskufi, born 1601 in Dobrnja near Tuzla, died after 1651) was a Bosnian Alhamiado poet and lexicographer. In 1631, he wrote the Bosnian–Turkish dictionary titled Makbul-i arif (also known as Potur Šahidi), which is considered the first Bosnian dictionary and one of the oldest South Slavic dictionaries in the Shtokavian dialect.

== Biography ==
Born in Dobrnja near Tuzla, in the Sanjak of Zvornik, Uskufi came from a Bosnian bey family. He lost his parents at a young age. Though little is known about his education, his writings show he was well-versed in Turkish, Arabic, Persian, and Bosnian.

His name appears in various forms due to non-vocalized Arabic script, and his surname remains unknown. Uskufi identified himself as a Bosnevi (which translates to Bosnian or Bosniak) and used multiple pseudonyms—Hevai, meaning "airy" or "spiritual" in Arabic, as his poetic name, and Uskufi, likely referring to a Janissary cap, indicating his possible service at the Ottoman court in Constantinople under Sultan Murad IV. Some scholars suggest he served at the Sultan’s court in Istanbul under Murad IV, after which he either received a pension and returned to the Zvornik Sanjak or was appointed as a kadija (judge) there.

Uskufi wrote religious and moralistic poetry in the Alhamiado tradition, primarily in Bosnian using Arabic script. His themes include social injustice, corruption, moral decay, solitude, and the human struggle between truth and falsehood. Though not prolific, he is regarded as one of the most significant poets of Bosnian Alhamiado literature. Notable poems include Molimo se tebi Bože, Bože jedini, ti nas ne kinji, and Višnjem Bogu koji sve sazda. His poem Poziv na vjeru has been interpreted both as a call to conversion and as a plea for interfaith coexistence.

In 1631, Uskufi authored Makbul-i arif, a Bosnian–Turkish rhymed dictionary inspired by İbrahim Şâhidî's Persian–Turkish rhymed dictionaryTuhfe-i Şâhidî. The dictionary contains over 600 verses and approximately 2,000 words, organized into thematic chapters covering topics such as religion, nature, family, body and soul, love, travel, and death. The work is preserved in around 40 manuscript copies housed in institutions such as the Gazi Husrev-beg Library and the Oriental Institute in Sarajevo, as well as the University Library in Uppsal. The original manuscript is lost, and the extant versions show significant textual variation. Uskufi wrote in a clear and authentic variety of the Bosnian language, predominantly in the ikavian dialect, with minimal Turkish influence in his poetry. Linguists note that this dialectal choice likely reflects his family background rather than broader regional speech patterns.

== Legacy ==
Following a collaboration between the University of Oslo and the Bosnian Ministry of Education and sciences, the dictionary was reissued on national day in 2012 during a ceremony in Tuzla, the birth town of Hevaji. According to the Norwegian Slavist Svein Mønnesland, the dictionary is made relevant today not least because of political aspects since it shows the Bosnian language to have a long tradition.
