= Dobrnja =

Dobrnja may refer to:

- Dobrnja, Banja Luka, Bosnia and Herzegovina
- Dobrnja, Tuzla, Bosnia and Herzegovina
