= Melvyn Goldstein =

American anthropologist

Melvyn C. Goldstein
- Born: February 8, 1938 (age 88); New York City
- Citizenship: United States
- Education: University of Washington; University of Michigan
- Known for: Tibetology
- Awards: Member of the National Academy of Sciences (2009); Joseph Levenson Book Prize Honorable Mention (1989)
- Scientific career
- Fields: Anthropology
- Workplaces: Case Western Reserve University

Melvyn C. Goldstein (born February 8, 1938) is an American social anthropologist and Tibet scholar. He is a professor of anthropology at Case Western Reserve University and a member of the National Academy of Sciences.

His research focuses on Tibetan society, history and contemporary politics, population studies, polyandry, studies in cultural and development ecology, economic change and cross-cultural gerontology.

== Education and career ==
Goldstein was born in New York City on February 8, 1938. Goldstein obtained a BA with a major in history in 1959, and an MA in history in 1960 from the University of Michigan. He pursued his research in anthropology at the University of Washington and was awarded a PhD in 1968. In 1968, he joined the faculty of the Department of Anthropology at Case Western Reserve University as an assistant professor. He became an associate professor in 1974 and full Professor in 1978. From 1975 to 2002 he was the Chairman of the Department of Anthropology. Between 1987 and 1991 he was the Director of the Center for Research on Tibet, and is still the co-director. From 1991 he has been the Professor (on secondary appointment) of the International Health, School of Medicine. He was elected to the U.S. National Academy of Sciences (Section 51, Anthropology) in 2009.

== Research ==
Goldstein has conducted research in different parts of Tibet (mainly in the Tibet Autonomous Region of China) on a range of topics including nomadic pastoralism, the impact of reforms on rural Tibet, family planning and fertility, modern Tibetan history, and socio-economic change. He has also conducted research in India (with Tibetan refugees in Bylakuppe), in northwest Nepal (with a Tibetan border community in Limi), in western Mongolia (with a nomadic pastoral community in Khovd Province) and in inland China (with Han Chinese on modernization and the elderly).

Goldstein and Cynthia Beall were the first Western anthropologists to conduct extensive field research in Tibet when they stayed for 16 months between June 1986 and June 1988. Part of their research from that trip included 10 months living with a community of Tibetan nomads, which was published in the book Nomads of Western Tibet: The Survival of a Way of Life and described by Per Kvaerne as "the first anthropological survey of a community in present-day Tibet".

His later projects include: an oral history of Tibet, Volume Three (1955–57) of his four-volume History of Modern Tibet series, and a longitudinal study of the impact of China's reform policies on rural Tibet (nomads and farmers). He completed an NSF study investigating modernization and changing patterns of intergenerational relations in rural Tibet from 2005 to 2007.

=== Reception ===
Goldstein's History of Modern Tibet series was described as "decades of groundbreaking scholarship on the society and history of Central Tibet" by historian Benno Weiner. His work portrays pre-1950 Tibet as "de facto independent" as well as a feudal theocracy. The first volume in the series, A History of Modern Tibet, 1913-1951: The Demise of the Lamaist State, written with the assistance of Gelek Rimpoche, was awarded Honorable Mention for the Joseph Levenson Book Prize in 1989 by the Association for Asian Studies. The second volume was described by historian A. Tom Grunfeld as "an extraordinarily detailed and nuanced history".

Colin Mackerras labeled Goldstein as "well known in the field of Tibetan studies" and described his book On the Cultural Revolution in Tibet: The Nyemo Incident of 1969 with Ben Jiao and Tanzen Lhundrup an "extraordinary book" and "excellent history".

== Honours and recognition ==
- The Frank and Dorothy Hummel Hovorka Prize, Case Western Reserve University, in 2012
- Elected Member, National Academy of Sciences, Section 51, Anthropology, in 2009
- The Association for Asian Studies's Joseph Levenson Book Prize, Honorable Mention, 1989
- Member, National Committee on United States-China Relations, 1997 to present

== Personal life ==
Goldstein married the daughter of the Tibetan scholar-official-aristocrat, Surkhang Wangchen Gelek.

Goldstein collects bonsai trees.

== Selected publications ==
=== Dissertation ===
- An Anthropological Study of the Tibetan Political System, University of Washington, Ph.D. in Anthropology, 1968.

=== Books ===
- A History of Modern Tibet, Volume 1: 1913-1951: The Demise of the Lamaist State, assisted by Gelek Rimpoche, University of California Press, 1989, ISBN 0-520-07590-0
- (with Cynthia M. Beall), Nomads of Western Tibet: The Survival of a Way of Life, University of California Press, 1990.
- (with Cynthia M. Beall), The Changing World of Mongolia's Nomads, University of California Press, 1994.
- The Snow Lion and the Dragon: China, Tibet and the Dalai Lama, University of California Press, 1997.
- (with William Siebenschuh, and Tashi Tsering), The Struggle for Modern Tibet: The Autobiography of Tashi Tsering, Armonk, NY: M.E. Sharpe, Inc., 1997.
- Chinese Edition of The Struggle for a Modern Tibet: the Life of Tashi Tsering, Mirror Books, Carle Place, NY., 2000.
- A New Tibetan English Dictionary of Modern Tibetan, University of California Press, Pp. 1200, 2001.
- (with Dawei Sherap, William Siebenschuh), A Tibetan Revolutionary. The Political Life of Bapa Phüntso Wangye, University of California Press, 2004.
- A History of Modern Tibet, Volume 2: The Calm Before the Storm: 1951-1955, University of California Press, 2007, ISBN 978-0-520-24941-7.
- (with Ben Jiao, Tanzen Lhundrup), On the Cultural Revolution in Tibet: The Nyemo Incident of 1969, University of California Press, 2009, ISBN 978-0-520-25682-8.
- A History of Modern Tibet, Volume 3: The Storm Clouds Descend, 1955–1957, University of California Press, 2013, ISBN 978-0-520-27651-2.
- A History of Modern Tibet, Volume 4: In the Eye of the Storm, 1957-1959, University of California Press, 2019, ISBN 978-0520278554.

=== Special report ===
- Tibet, China and the United States: Reflections on the Tibet Question, Occasional Paper Series, The Atlantic Council of the United States, April 1995.

=== Editorship ===
- (with Matthew Kapstein (eds.)), Buddhism in Contemporary Tibet: Religious Revival and Cultural Identity, University of California Press, 1998.
