= International Seminar of Young Tibetologists =

International Seminar of Young Tibetologists (ISYT) was founded to create a venue for collaboration and exchange for postgraduate students and early career researchers who study all aspects of focusing on Tibetan Studies including; culture, history, linguistics, region, and religion. This was achieved through convening the first ISYT conference at the School of Oriental and African Studies, University of London, in August 2007, and by founding the ISYT as a sustainable research association that convenes conferences every two to three years.

== History ==
In 1977, Martin Brauen and Per Kværne convened the Seminar of Young Tibetologists in Zürich. They invited sixty scholars, thirty of whom attended the five-day conference. Based on their success, another conference was planned, to take place in Oxford.

That conference, convened by Michael Aris and Aung San Suu Kyi, marked the formal beginning of the International Association for Tibetan Studies (IATS). Later, the Seminar of Young Tibetologists was retroactively awarded the status of being the first IATS seminar. The IATS seminars doubled at nearly every meeting, and, alongside the Sándor Kőrösi Csoma Symposium, became the premier conference in the field of Tibetan studies. With success came exponential growth, and by the time of the fourth seminar in Narita, it was impractical for participants to attend every paper.

At the 11th meeting of the International Association for Tibetan Studies (IATS) in Germany in 2006, the idea was mooted of a separate, but related organisation with a specific focus on Tibetologists in the early stages of their careers.

== Seminars ==
The first International Seminar of Young Tibetologists was convened in London at the School of Oriental and African Studies, in August 2007 by Tim Myatt and Brandon Dotson. The papers presented at this London conference were published in a peer-reviewed academic journal by Serindia, entitled "Contemporary Visions in Tibetan Studies."

The second International Seminar of Young Tibetologists was convened in Paris in September 2009, by Elijah Ary, Marc-Henri Deroche, Alice Travers and Nicolas Schneider and saw the participation of approximately 50 participants from 15 different countries. The proceedings of this conference were published by Revue d'Études Tibétaines.

The third International Seminar of Young Tibetologists was convened at the Kobe City University of Foreign Studies in Kobe, Japan from 3 to 7 September 2012 by Kazushi Iwao, Seiji Kumagai, Ai Nishida and Meishi Yamamoto. 60 papers were presented over twenty-two panel sessions and 13 poster presentations. The proceedings of the conference were published as volume 51 of the Journal of Research Institute (Kobe City University of Foreign Studies).

The fourth International Seminar of Young Tibetologists was convened from 7 to 12 September 2015 at Leipzig University, Germany by Franz Xaver Erhard, Jeannine Bischoff, Lewis Doney, Jörg Heimbel and Emilia Roza Sulek. More than 80 papers were presented in both panel sessions and poster presentations. The proceedings of the conference were published in the 2016 December Special Issue of the esteemed peer-review journal Revue d'Études Tibétaines. In 2017 the articles were collected into a printed volume, published by Edition Tethys

The fifth International Seminar of Young Tibetologists was convened by Natalia Moskaleva and Pavel Gorkhovsky at Saint Petersburg State University, Russia, from 3 to 7 September 2018. Altogether 69 papers were presented at the seminar. The proceedings were published in 2020 as special issue "New Currents on the Neva River" in the peer-review journal Revue d'Études Tibétaines; a printed volume, will again be published by Edition Tethys.

The sixth International Seminar of Young Tibetologists was held at the University of Virginia, Charlottesville, Virginia, US, 9–13 August 2021.

The seventh International Seminar of Young Tibetologists took place at Wolfson College, Oxford, University of Oxford, 2–6 September 2024. The book of abstracts from the seminar can be found here.

== Governance ==
=== Governing Board ===
The governing board of the ISYT consists of the President, Secretary General and Advisors. As of 2018, the President of ISYT is Natalia Moskaleva (Saint-Petersburg State University), the Secretary General is Natasha Mikles (Texas State University). Brandon Dotson has served as the President and Tim Myatt as the Secretary General of ISYT from 2007 to 2012. Brandon Dotson is associate professor in the Department of Theology at Georgetown University and Tim Myatt completed his doctorate in Anglo-Tibetan relations at the Oriental Institute, Oxford University, England. Seiji Kumagai, an associate professor at the Department of Bhutanese Studies in Kyoto University in Kyoto, Japan, served as the Secretary General of ISYT from 2012 to 2015. Kalsang Norbu Gurung (Bonn University in Bonn, Germany) served as president from 2012 to 2018 and Lewis Doney as Secretary General from 2015 to 2018.

=== Advisory board ===
As of 2018, the President of ISYT is Natalia Moskaleva (Saint-Petersburg State University), the Secretary General is Natasha Mikles (Texas State University). The ISYT Board of Advisers elected during the business meeting in 2018 consists of the following 8 scholars:

- Maria Coma
- Nyima Woser Choekhortshang
- Cécile Ducher
- Franz Xaver Erhard
- Lucia Galli
- Emanuela Garatti
- Karma Tso
- Lobsang Thapka

=== Statutes of ISYT ===
At the first seminar held at London, the statutes of the International Seminar of Young Tibetologists were passed during the business meeting on 12 August 2007 and revised at subsequent business meetings. The statutes were published in both the English and the Tibetan language in the Book of Abstracts of the fourth Seminar held in Leipzig in 2015 and an updated version is published on the seminars website.

== See also ==
- Tibet
- Vajrayana Buddhism
- Tibetologist
