= Eisenvogel =

Book by Yangzom Brauen

- German language cover
- Author: Yangzom Brauen
- Language: German
- Subject: Tibetan diaspora, Tibet, refugees, Switzerland
- Genre: Biography, Novel
- Publisher: Random House
- Publication date: 9 November 2010 (paperback)
- Publication place: Switzerland
- Media type: book, paperback, eBook, audiobook
- Pages: 416 as German–language paperback
- ISBN: 978-3-453-64526-4 (paperback)

Eisenvogel is a Swiss book published by the Swiss-Tibetan writer, film director, and actress Yangzom Brauen. The full title of the biography is "Eisenvogel: Drei Frauen aus Tibet – Die Geschichte meiner Familie", which literally means Iron bird: Three women from Tibet – The history of my family. First published in 2009, the illustrated book is also distributed as in paperback, eBook, and audiobook forms in German. Brauen later became known for directing Who Killed Johnny.

== Plot summary ==
Yangzom Brauen is of Tibetan origin and was raised in the cantons of Thurgau and Bern in Switzerland. After she graduated, she migrated to Los Angeles and starred in some movies. She comes from a cosmopolitan family: Her father, a Bernese ethnologist, also moved to the US, and lives with her mother, the Tibetan artist Sonam Dolma Brauen, in New York. Her grandmother lives in a student apartment in Bern. There are worlds between the world in which the grandmother grew up, and that of the young actress. Her grandmother was a Bhikkhunī, a female monk, in eastern Tibet, who emigrated when the 14th Dalai Lama took refuge in Dharamshala in 1959. Yangzom's mother was aged six when they crossed the Himalayas on foot, but Sonam's father and little sister died. How the grandmother handled all these strokes of fate, in such foreign places as India, Switzerland, and the US, is the central focus of Eisenvogel.

== Title of the book ==
After the annexation of Tibet, the dark prophecy of a monk from the eighth century fulfilled: «When the iron bird flies and horses on wheels rolling, then Tibetans will have to leave their homes like ants.» The title of the book refers to that prophecy.

== Critical response ==
The medial response in newspaper, radio and television is widely positive, and the book was listed on the bestselling lists in Switzerland and other German-speaking countries.

The life stories of grandmother, daughter and granddaughter put an oppressed country in a new light.

— Heike Vowinkel, Die Welt

In 2009, the book became a best seller in the German-language area with over 100,000 copies sold.

== International publishing ==
Eisenvogel was also published in English in 2011:

- Across Many Mountains: Three Daughters of Tibet. London: Harvill Secker. 2011. ISBN 978-1-84655-344-8.
- Across Many Mountains: A Tibetan Family's Epic Journey from Oppression to Freedom. New York: St. Martins Press. 2011. ISBN 978-0312600136.

== Film, television and theatrical adaptations ==
A film was announced in 2012, but is as of November 2014 not released respectively Yangzom Brauen starred as Tibetan woman in the 2012 film Escape from Tibet.

== See also ==
- Immigration to Switzerland
- Tibet Institute Rikon
- Tibetan diaspora
