= Van Manen =

Van Manen is a Dutch toponymic surname meaning "from Manen", a former town in Gelderland now part of Ede. Variants include Van Maanen and Van Maenen. People with this name include:

- Aletta van Manen (born 1958), Dutch field hockey player
- Bert van Manen (born 1965), Australian politician
- Bertien van Manen (1942–2024), Dutch photographer
- Hans van Manen (1932–2025), Dutch choreographer and ballet dancer
- Jacob van Manen (1752–1822), Dutch writer, patriot, and judge
- Johan van Manen (1877–1943), Dutch orientalist
- Max van Manen (born 1942), Dutch-born Canadian academic
- Willem van Manen (1940–2024), Dutch jazz composer and trombonist
- Willem Christiaan van Manen (1842–1905), Dutch theologian
