= Namling =

Namling རྣམ་གླིང་ · 南木林镇
- Town
- Location in the Tibet Autonomous Region
- Coordinates (Namling Town government): 29°41′06″N 89°06′04″E
- Country: People's Republic of China
- Autonomous region: Tibet
- Prefecture-level city: Shigatse
- County: Namling

Population
  - Major Nationalities: Tibetan
  - Regional dialect: Tibetan language
- Time zone: UTC+8 (China Standard)

Namling or Namlingxoi (Tibetan: རྣམ་གླིང་; Chinese: 南木林镇; pinyin: Nánmùlín Zhèn) is a town and seat of Namling County in the Tibet Autonomous Region of China, about 72 kilometres (45 mi) by road northeast of Shigatse (the second largest town in Tibet), north of Dobjoi.

== Geography ==
The town is located at an altitude of 4683 metres (15,367 feet), at a bend in the Tsangpo River. The township of Namling covers an area of 391 square kilometres (151 sq mi) and has a population of about 7000 people. Several forts can be seen along the hills above the river valley and one fort is the Namling Dzong. Vegetation in the area is sparse today, almost devoid of any vegetation looks like a desert country. Fossils (assessed to be of 15 million years age) unearthed here reveal that leaves, willows, alders, maples, rhododendrons and conifers existed here. The village is situated on a cone-shaped hill.

== Education ==
Namling has developed in recent times into a regional educational centre, overlooked by the Bureau of Education. In 1993, the Namling County Schools Project received funding from the US-based Boulder-Lhasa Sister City Project. The schools of this project achieved the best results in 1994, in Tibet.

== Notable landmarks ==
Namling Dzong is a prominent fortress in the area, which has been likened to European castles along the Rhine. In the early 17th century, the 5th Dalai Lama founded the Ganden Chökhor monastery in Namling, reached via a chain bridge; it was the first of thirteen monasteries of his era. There were 300 monks at the monastery in 1908. It was the seat of the Teshu Lamas.

== Villages ==
The township contains the following villages:

- Ren'ou Village (仁欧村)
- Xuedui Village (雪堆村)
- Gangba Village (岗巴村)
- Qiawa Village (恰娃村)
- Gangga Village (岗嘎村)
- Xuemai Village (雪麦村)
- Gabu Village (嘎布村)
- Kong'a Village (孔阿村)
- Miru Village (米如村)
- Baimadang Village (白玛当村)
- Jilong Village (吉龙村)
- Dalong Village (达龙村)
