= Namling County =

Namling County 南木林县 • རྣམ་གླིང་རྫོང་།
- County
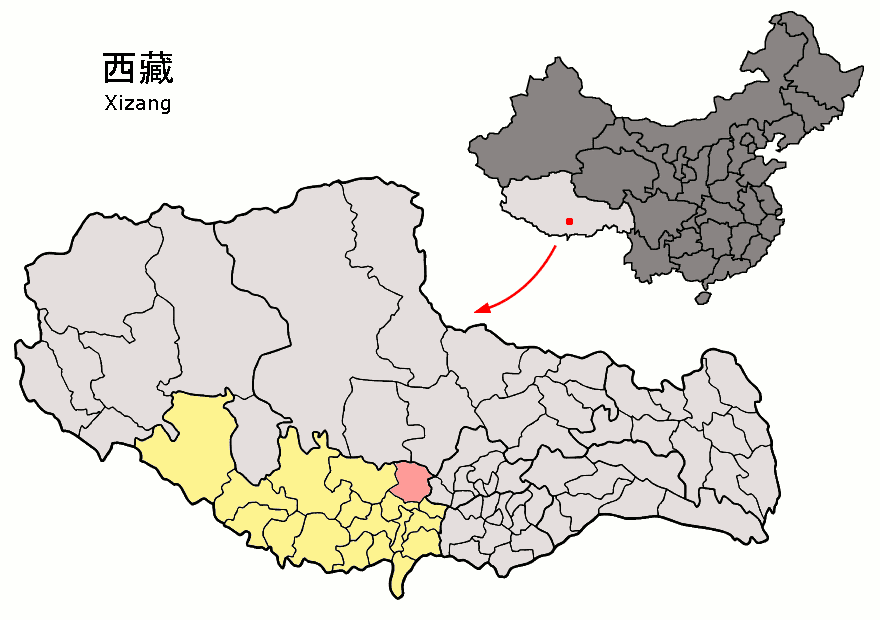
- Location of Namling County (red) within Shigatse City (yellow) and the Tibet Autonomous Region

- Location of the seat in Tibet Namling (China)
- Coordinates: 29°53′07″N 89°26′10″E
- Country: China
- Autonomous region: Tibet
- Prefecture-level city: Shigatse
- County seat: Namling

Area
  - Total: 8,106.84 km^{2} (3,130.07 sq mi)

Population (2020)
  - Total: 83,531
  - Density: 10.304/km^{2} (26.687/sq mi)
- Time zone: UTC+8 (China Standard)
- Website: www.nmlx.gov.cn

Namling County

Chinese name
- Simplified Chinese: 南木林县
- Traditional Chinese: 南木林縣
Transcriptions
Standard Mandarin
- Hanyu Pinyin: Nánmùlín Xiàn

Tibetan name
- Tibetan: རྣམ་གླིང་རྫོང་།
Transcriptions
- Wylie: rnam gling rdzong
- Tibetan Pinyin: Namling Zong

Namling County (Tibetan: རྣམ་གླིང་རྫོང་།; Chinese: 南木林县) is a county of Shigatse in the Tibet Autonomous Region, China.

== Geography ==
Namling is the current administrative name given to the valleys of Oyuk, Tobgyet, and Shang ... [associated]... with both Buddhism and Bon. Through these valleys respectively flow the 'Nang-gung-chu'mang ra chu Tobpu-chu, and Shang-chu rivers, with their various tributaries, which rise amid the southern slopes of the Nyenchen Tanglha range to the north, and flow southwards to converge with the Brahmaputra [called the Yarlung Tsangpo River in Tibet].

The lower reaches of the Yarlung Tsangpo River make "a sharp U-turn around Namjagbarwa Peak in Pai, Namling County." This is regarded as the starting point of the Yarlung Tsangpo Grand Canyon in Nyingchi Prefecture, which stretches 496 kilometres (308 mi) and averages over 5,000 metres (3.1 mi) in depth. The county has three geysers.

== Administration divisions ==
Namling County is divided into 1 town and 16 townships.

Name	Chinese	Hanyu Pinyin	Tibetan	Wylie
Town
Namling Town	南木林镇	Nánmùlín zhèn	རྣམ་གླིང་གྲོང་རྡལ།	snam gling grong rdal
Townships
Dagna Township	达那乡	Dánà xiāng	སྟག་སྣ་ཤང་།	stag sna shang
Karzê Township	卡孜乡	Kǎzī xiāng	མཁར་རྩེ་ཤང་།	mkhar rtse shang
Doqoi Township	多角乡	Duōjiǎo xiāng	མདོ་མཆོད་ཤང་།	mdo mchod shang
Qum Township	秋木乡	Qiūmù xiāng	ཆུམ་ཤང་།	chum shang
Êma Township	艾玛乡	Àimǎ xiāng	ཡེ་མ་ཤང་།	ye ma shang
Tobgyai Township	土布加乡	Tǔbùjiā xiāng	ཐོབ་རྒྱལ་ཤང་།	thob rgyal shang
Car Township	茶尔乡	Chá'ěr xiāng	ཚར་ཤང་།	tshar shang
Sogqên Township	索金乡	Suǒjīn xiāng	སོག་ཆེན་ཤང་།	sog chen shang
Dakce Township	达孜乡	Dázī xiāng	སྟག་རྩེ་ཤང་།	stag rtse shang
Numa Township	奴玛乡	Númǎ xiāng	ནུ་མ་ཤང་།	nu ma shang
Ratang Township	热当乡	Rèdāng xiāng	ར་ཐང་ཤང་།	ra thang shang
Lhabupu Township	拉布普乡	Lābùpǔ xiāng	ལྷ་བུ་ཕུ་ཤང་།	lha bu phu shang
Putang Township	普当乡	Pǔdāng xiāng	ཕུ་ཐང་ཤང་།	phu thang shang
Rindü Township	仁堆乡	Rénduī xiāng	རིན་འདུས་ཤང་།	rin 'dus shang
Mangra Township	芒热乡	Mángrè xiāng	མང་ར་ཤང་།	mang ra shang
Gyamco Township	甲措乡	Jiǎcuò xiāng	རྒྱ་མཚོ་ཤང་།	rgyal mtsho shang

== Climate ==
Climate data for Namling, elevation 4,000 m (13,000 ft), (1991–2020 normals, extremes 1981–present)
Month	Jan	Feb	Mar	Apr	May	Jun	Jul	Aug	Sep	Oct	Nov	Dec	Year
Record high °C (°F)	16.9 (62.4)	17.4 (63.3)	20.9 (69.6)	22.0 (71.6)	25.2 (77.4)	27.8 (82.0)	27.8 (82.0)	25.3 (77.5)	23.6 (74.5)	22.1 (71.8)	19.6 (67.3)	15.9 (60.6)	27.8 (82.0)
Mean daily maximum °C (°F)	5.5 (41.9)	7.3 (45.1)	10.5 (50.9)	13.9 (57.0)	17.9 (64.2)	21.5 (70.7)	20.5 (68.9)	19.7 (67.5)	18.5 (65.3)	14.9 (58.8)	10.4 (50.7)	7.2 (45.0)	14.0 (57.2)
Daily mean °C (°F)	−3.0 (26.6)	−0.5 (31.1)	3.1 (37.6)	6.7 (44.1)	10.5 (50.9)	14.0 (57.2)	13.6 (56.5)	12.8 (55.0)	11.0 (51.8)	6.7 (44.1)	1.6 (34.9)	−2.0 (28.4)	6.2 (43.2)
Mean daily minimum °C (°F)	−10.8 (12.6)	−8.4 (16.9)	−4.4 (24.1)	−0.4 (31.3)	3.6 (38.5)	7.2 (45.0)	8.4 (47.1)	7.8 (46.0)	5.6 (42.1)	0.1 (32.2)	−5.2 (22.6)	−9.2 (15.4)	−0.5 (31.2)
Record low °C (°F)	−17.8 (0.0)	−16.5 (2.3)	−13.0 (8.6)	−7.5 (18.5)	−3.3 (26.1)	0.2 (32.4)	2.6 (36.7)	1.3 (34.3)	0.0 (32.0)	−7.2 (19.0)	−11.9 (10.6)	−16.9 (1.6)	−17.8 (0.0)
Average precipitation mm (inches)	0.4 (0.02)	0.6 (0.02)	1.5 (0.06)	5.6 (0.22)	23.4 (0.92)	86.5 (3.41)	150.5 (5.93)	139.1 (5.48)	74.2 (2.92)	4.9 (0.19)	0.6 (0.02)	0.4 (0.02)	487.7 (19.21)
Average precipitation days (≥ 0.1 mm)	0.6	0.9	1.3	3.5	7.2	13.3	21.0	21.7	14.8	2.3	0.6	0.3	87.5
Average snowy days	1.1	1.7	2.7	5.9	2.8	0	0	0	0.1	1.3	0.8	0.7	17.1
Average relative humidity (%)	24	24	26	34	43	53	66	70	66	45	29	24	42
Mean monthly sunshine hours	219.4	216.2	245.0	246.4	282.3	265.7	211.2	209.7	231.6	274.7	242.0	228.0	2,872.2
Percentage possible sunshine	67	68	65	63	67	63	50	52	63	78	77	72	65
Source: China Meteorological Administration all-time record high

== Development efforts ==
The Namling County Schools Project was founded by Tashi Tsering in 1991, and has been sponsored by the Boulder-Lhasa Sister City Project (BLSCP) since 1994. As of 2013, it supports 53 rural elementary schools.

As of 2006, 15 out of the county's 17 towns had cell phone service.

As of 2001, potatoes have been introduced in Aimagang (Emagang) as a crop for herdsmen in the county. Potatoes and vegetables were shipped to markets in Xigazê, and production of peas and wheat decreased.

The 2009 HIV/AIDS outreach efforts in rural areas of the county appear to have had a positive impact in comparison to a similar non-intervention area of Tingri County, according to Medicus Mundi Switzerland.

In 2010, protests of environmental damage by gold mining resulted in arrests and at least one fatality.

In 2011, Qin Weiqiang, secretary of the Namling County Party Committee, said that after the "Lhasa–Xigazê Railway is put into operation", the number of tourists in Namling County was expected to increase.

== Culture ==
"The famous local specialities are silver utensils, Tibetan sword and so on. Namling Town is the office place of Namling with a population 5,000, where are many monasteries."

Traditional Tibetan opera is popular in Namling County, and government funding efforts to preserve the tradition were started in 2005. "Xiangba Tibetan play in Namling County of Tibet has a history of more than 700 years. It is one of the four major schools of the blue-mask Tibetan play, and was born in the late 18th century." Local residents preserve "some traditional Tibetan operas such as "Princess Wencheng", "Chimei Gongdan", "Langsa Wenbo" and so on." "Tongdong Gyaibo (1365-1455), the founder of Tibet Opera, was born in Ngamring County. Legend has it that the iron chain bridge over the Xiongqoi River in Namling County was built with funds collected by Tongdong Gyaibo through performances."

Namling County and the Xiangqu River Basin were a cultural center of the Supi tribe, known as "The Kingdom of Women", and "one of the earliest tribes in Tibet." After "the end of the sixth century, the Supi tribe moved its political center to the Lhasa River Basin."

As of 1999, the county was home to the critically endangered Golden-headed box turtle (Cuora aurocapitata).

== Monasteries ==
Yungdrungling Monastery "is located at the foot of the Yulha Jiesam mountain in the Numa village in Namling County about 90 km. from Xigazê. The monastery is surrounded by dense wood ... it is one of the four major monasteries of Bon religion in Tibet."

Danag Monastery, over 800 years old, is located in Danag Village.

The remains of the Dingma Monastery, an 11th-century Kadampa monastery, are located on a hill in the Oyuk Valley. It was founded by Ram Dingma Deshek Jungne, a student of Geshe Potowa.

The Gongon Lhakhang temple, in Oyuk Township, was said to be built by Songtsen Gampo, and frequented by Padmasambhava and his students Namkhai Nyingpo and King Trisong Detsen in the 8th century.

Oyuk Chigong or Oyuk Jara Gon is a hermitage located at Jarasa in lower Oyuk. It is "the abode or castle of the protector deity Dorje Lekpa: guardian of the Dzogchen teachings."

The Gelukpa monasteries of Drungzhi and Sogchen are located in the Tobgyel Valley.

Gadan Chiokorling Monastery, located 1 km (0.62 mi) from the county center, originally called Gegon Songrapling Monastery, became part of the Gelgupa Sect during the reign of the 5th Dalai Lama.

== Notable people ==
- Mokchokpa Rinchen Tsondrü (1110-1170?) of the Shangpa Kagyu was born in the Lhabu grasslands of the county's Shang Valley.
- Lobsang Yeshe, Fifth Panchen Lama (1663–1737) was born in Namling County.
- Tenpai Wangchuk, 8th Panchen Lama (1855–1882) was born in Namling County.
- Chadrel Rinpoche (b. 1940) was born in Namling County.
- Guisang Sang (b. appx. 1958), who joined the Tibet Mountaineering Team in 1982, was the first woman in Asia to reach the top of Mount Everest twice.
- Tashi Tsering (educator) (1929–2014)
