= Aud Talle =

Norwegian social anthropologist (1944–2011)

Aud Talle (23 September 1944 – 16 August 2011) was a Norwegian social anthropologist.

She graduated as mag.art. (PhD equivalent) from the University of Oslo and as fil. dr. from Stockholm University. She was a research assistant at the University of Bergen from 1975 to 1977, lector at Stockholm University from 1990 to 1995 and professor at the University of Oslo from 1995. She conducted her field work in Kenya, Somalia, Tanzania and London.

Talle was a member of the board of the Institute for Comparative Research in Human Culture.
