= Tashi Tsering (educator) =

Tibetan writer

Tashi Tsering (Tibetan: བཀྲ་ཤིས་ཚེ་རིང་, Wylie: bKra-shis Tse-ring), born in 1929 in Guchok, Namling County, Shigatse prefecture, and died on 5 December 2014 (aged 84–85) in Lhasa, is a Tibetan of peasant origin, author of the autobiography, My fight for a modern Tibet, Life story of Tashi Tsering, where he describes the life he led successively in pre-communist Tibet, in exile in India and the United States, and finally back in China during the Cultural Revolution, between Tibet and Eastern China in the decades that followed.

== Early life ==
=== In the village ===
Tashi Tsering was the son of a poor peasant family living outside Lhasa. They live in a village stone house, the first and second floors are used as living space and the ground floor accommodates the animals. They grow barley and lentils and raise yaks, goats and sheep. The family makes its clothing by spinning wool and weaving it on wooden looms. She uses barter to obtain products like salt. Tashi Tsering's father is a scholar.

=== At the dance school ===
In 1939, at the age of 10, he was designated to become a gadrugba (Tibetan: གར་ཕྲུག་པ, Wylie: gar phrug pa), a young dancer of the Gar, traditional dance troupe of the Dalai Lama, also called the dance society of the Tibetan government. It is a servitude traditionally owed by his village and abhorred by all because it almost amounts, for parents, to losing a son. Young Tashi, however, is not unhappy with this situation, even if his mother is desperate: it is in fact the opportunity for him to learn to read and write, his dearest wish.

At the dance school the method used by the masters to stimulate the students is to hit them for each mistake they make, as has been done for centuries. Tashi still bears the marks of almost daily corrections. At the age of 13, in 1942, he was whipped in front of the entire troupe for having been absent from a performance: his skin tore, the pain became unbearable.

The young dancer makes his way by becoming the drombo (Wylie: mgron po, literally the 'guest'), that is to say, euphemistically, the “passive homosexual companion" and according to Goldstein "sex toy" by Wangdu, a monk with interpersonal skills who treats him gently and promotes his intellectual training. But he was kidnapped and sequestered for a few days by a dob-dob and managed to escape, no one having been able to do anything to help him, this dob-dob being known for his ferocity had always a dagger on him. (according to Jean-Pierre Barou and Sylvie Crossman, these warrior-monks could go so far as to fight among themselves to possess the favors of a cute)

Tashi is surprised that such behavior can be tolerated in monasteries: "When I spoke about 'dob-dob' to other monks and monastic leaders, they shrugged their shoulders and simply said that it was the course of things". Patrick French, who met Tashi Tsering in Lhasa in 1999, where French noted the oppressive atmosphere linked to the massive presence of security forces, indicates that he is not homosexual but that he took advantage of this relationship for personal purposes. During his interview, Tashi Tsering told him that in hindsight, he saw the "sexual practices of ancient Tibet, as a matter of habits and conventions, the accepted social consequence of people exploiting the loopholes of religious rules.".

Tashi's mother arranges her son's loveless marriage to Tsebei, a fairly wealthy girl. Tashi therefore goes to live with his in-laws but refuses to be commanded by his father-in-law and his brothers-in-law, who have nothing but contempt for him because of his humble origins. After three months, he left home. As this marriage could not take place without the permission of the head of Gadrugba, Tashi must, to be untied, undergo twenty-five blows of the whip.

In 1947 Tashi, who was eighteen years old, applied for a position as secretary to the treasury of the Potala Palace. Passing the entrance exam, he is assigned to an office headed by two monks and a nobleman. He stayed there for about a year.

=== In the 1950s ===
Of the Chinese troops present in Lhasa in 1952, he noted the efficiency and autonomy, declaring that the soldiers would not even have borrowed a needle from the inhabitants. He is fascinated by their practices, which are different from those of the Tibetans: they fish in rivers with a worm on the end of a hook, they collect dog and human droppings to serve as fertilizer in their search for food autonomy, practices that Tashi finds repulsive. He also remembers that a loudspeaker was installed in the heart of the city and broadcast propaganda in the Tibetan language.

He is impressed by the achievements of the Chinese: opening of the first primary schools, a hospital and various public buildings in Lhasa. In a short period of time, he sees more improvement than he has seen in his life, or even than Tibet has seen in centuries.

Tashi has an affair with a noble girl named Thondrup Dromala. The opposition of the latter's family and the young man's limited resources ultimately got the better of their couple despite the birth of a boy in 1953.

== Studies ==
=== In India (1957–1959) ===
Resourceful, in 1957 he managed to raise the necessary funds to study in India. He was abroad when the 1959 Tibetan uprising.

He worked closely with exiled Tibetan resistance leaders, in particular an older brother of 14th Dalai Lama Tenzin Gyatso, Gyalo Thondup (" Gyalola as we called him"), with whom he befriended. He assists him in welcoming the Tibetan refugees, without knowing that Gyalo Thondup is financed by the CIA and that he has significant financial resources.

One of his tasks is to collect stories of atrocities from refugees. He found very few and most of the refugees he interviewed were illiterate and unable to present their experience in an orderly and logical manner. Many have not even seen the battles waged by the Chinese army in Lhasa. They were caught up in the fear panic that had gripped the entire country. They have no story to tell other than the suffering they endured during their march across the mountain but not at the hands of the Chinese. Ultimately, the accounts recorded by him, along with those from other refugee camps, would be presented by the International Commission of Jurists in its 1960 report accusing China of atrocities.

In 1959, he was charged by his friend Gyalo Thondrup with taking care of part of the Dalai Lama's treasure which had been secured in 1950 in the reserves of Tashi Namgyal, maharaja of the Sikkim. After the Dalai Lama fled, the Chinese government demanded its return, claiming that it was not the Dalai Lama's property but that of the country, which they now considered as theirs. When Tashi Tsering intervenes, the treasure has just been transported by truck from Gangtok, the capital of Sikkim, to Siliguri further south. While the gold is sent by cargo plane to Calcutta, where it is entrusted to banks, the silver is kept with a trusted Tibetan trader, where Tashi must keep it for almost a month before participating in its melting into ingots.

=== In the United States (summer 1960 – end of 1963) ===
Tashi Tsering then meets an American student in India, thanks to whom he will be able to study in the United States. Before leaving, he meets the 14th Dalai Lama, who invites him to "be a good Tibetan", to "study seriously" and to "put his education at the service of his people and his country".

In July 1961, he arrived in Seattle after spending a year studying English at Williams College in Williamstown, Massachusetts. He would become one of the interpreters of Dezhung Rinpoche after the departure of Thupten Jigme Norbu in June 1962 and would also collaborate with E. Gene Smith.

He studied on the East Coast then in Seattle in State of Washington: his historical readings made him establish a parallel between the Western Middle Ages and the Tibetan society he came from. to leave.

It turns out that Tsejen Wangmo Sakya, a young Tibetan (from the important Sakya family) from Seattle, is impregnated by a monk, who refuses to marry her. The young woman's brother asks Tashi to marry Tsejen and recognize the child. The marriage takes place and, a few months later, a boy named Sonam Tsering is born.

Despite the incomprehension of his Tibetan friends in exile and his American classmates (including Melvyn Goldstein), he decides to return to Tibet to serve the Tibetans who remained in the country. Gyalo Thondrup tries to dissuade him, by promising him material advantages, but in vain. On 10 December 1963, Tashi left Seattle, leaving behind Tsejen and Sonam.

=== Return to Tibet (1964) ===
In 1964, he was the first Tibetan exiled in the West to return to Lhasa. He sees himself participating in the creation of a new and modern Tibet.

Upon his arrival in China, he was sent some 1,300 km northwest of Guangzhou, to the Xianyang Tibetan Minority Institute, which houses 2,500 students. He is part of a class of 40 Tibetans destined to become teachers in Tibet. He accepts Spartan conditions and indoctrination, because he sincerely believes in the merits of communism and hopes that his training will allow him to return to Tibet to teach.

== Under the Cultural Revolution (1966–1976) ==
In 1966, the Cultural Revolution began.

=== Revolutionary activism (June 1966 – October 1967) ===
Convinced that Tibet can only evolve towards a modern society based on egalitarian socialist principles by collaborating with the Chinese, Tashi Tsering becomes red guard. He participated in his first thamzing in June 1966, the leaders of the Xianyang school were humiliated in public by the students. He was one of the students chosen to march in Beijing in front of chairman Mao in September 1966. Residing in Lhasa from December 1966 to March 1967, he then wondered about the progress of the cultural revolution in Tibet. Then he returned to Xianyang in March.

=== Arrest at the Xianyang school (October 1967 – December 1970) ===
However, in November 1967, he was in turn denounced as a "counter-revolutionary" and a spy in the pay of the United States. After public humiliations and a conviction without real trial, he found himself in prison among intellectuals and officials, both Han and Tibetan. His stay in a prison in central China is appalling. On 23 March 1970 Tashi was formally accused of treason. In November 1970 he was incarcerated in Changwu prison in Shaanxi. At the beginning of December, he was transferred for three days to Xiangwu prison and then again for three days to Chengdu prison.

=== Lhasa Prison (December 1970 – May 1973) ===
He was eventually transferred, in December 1970, to Sangyib Prison in Lhasa, in the Tibet Autonomous Region. He remained there for two and a half years until May 1973. The conditions of detention and the food are improving: each cell is lit by a light bulb, the walls and floor are concrete and dry, he is entitled to three meals a day, butter tea, tsampa, sometimes a little meat. He even has the right to newspapers in Tibetan and Chinese.

=== Liberation (1973–1976) ===
In May 1973, Tashi Tsering was released. Always suspicious, he is assigned to manual work that does not suit him.

In the fall of 1974, he went to Lhasa to see his parents. There he married Sangyela, a long-time Tibetan friend, very religious, with whom he formed a very united couple.

During his long absence, his brother starved to death in prison, while his parents barely managed to survive in a half-destroyed monastery.

== Rehabilitation (1977–1978) ==
Taking advantage of the relaxation of the regime after Deng Xiaoping came to power in 1977, he went to Beijing to demand, and obtain, his complete rehabilitation. Officially rehabilitated in 1978, he began a new life at the age of fifty.

== The university professor and the school builder ==
Tashi Tsering was allowed to return to Tibet in 1981 and became a professor of English at the University of Tibet in Lhasa. He was able to begin writing a trilingual Tibetan-Chinese-English dictionary (which would be published in Beijing in 1988).

For her part, his wife obtained a license to sell chang, Tibetan cereal beer.

With the Open Door economic policy of Deng Xiaoping, businessmen and tourists arrived in Lhasa, creating a need for English-speaking guides.

=== Creation of a private English course ===
Noting that there was no teaching of English in Tibetan schools, he had the idea of opening evening classes in English in Lhasa in September 1985. Success was achieved, he made significant profits which he decided to use to open schools in his region of origin where there was no educational structure.

=== The schools of the plateau ===
He then fought to obtain the creation, in his village, of a primary school, which opened its doors in 1990.

Building on this success, and to finance the opening of other schools in the canton of Namling, he set up a business in carpets and handicraft items which prospered thanks to foreign visitors. In 1991, a second school opened, in Khartse.

This is how around fifty primary schools will be founded on the high plateau at his initiative and in collaboration with the county school authorities who distribute the funds, choose the locations, define the size of the schools, as well as with residents who voluntarily provide labor.

According to Tsering Woeser who interviewed him, Tashi Tséring is very concerned about the current state of the Tibetan language, but says "if we emphasize the importance of the Tibetan language, we will be accused of narrow nationalism, because according to official government guidelines, the higher the level of Tibetanness, the stronger the level of religious consciousness, and consequently the stronger the reactionary behavior".

== His autobiography ==
In 1992, having reconnected with Melvyn Goldstein, he returned to the United States to work on his autobiography with his former classmate. His memoirs were finally published in 1997 under the title The Struggle for Modern Tibet. The Autobiography of Tashi Tsering, and under the co-signature of Melvyn Goldstein, William Siebenschuh and Tashi Tsering. When it was released, the book was the only English-language text that could be said to come from a Tibetan living in Tibet (and not in exile).

For P. Christiaan Klieger, just as the refugee stories of 1959 had to be reshaped to be understandable and coherent, when Tashi Tsering gave the story of his life in the 1990s, it was in turn shaped but by two interlocutors (Melvyn Goldstein and William Siebenschuch) who believed the world needed to hear another message about Tibet. The castigation inflicted on Tashi Tsering by his Tibetan dance master, his elevation to the rank of official lover of a high-ranking monk, and his desire to work within the framework of Chinese Tibet serve to disrupt the idealized representation of Tibet in vogue among Westerners.

For Jamyang Norbu, the impression that emerges from reading Tashi Tsering's biography is that of extreme naivety.

== Second audience with the Dalai Lama ==
In 1994 (at age 65), he met the Dalai Lama again, at the University of Michigan, thirty years after their last meeting. Tashi tells the Dalai Lama that he respects his commitment to non-violence, but also suggests that Tibetans need to know how to oppose the Chinese when their policies seem unreasonable, but that Tibetans also need to learn how to live with them. Tashi further told the Dalai Lama that he believed he was in a unique situation to negotiate an agreement with the Chinese that could be favorable to both the Chinese and the Tibetans, and that both the Chinese and the Tibetans would listen to him. Tashi ardently wished that the Dalai Lama would once again unify his people, end the government in exile and return to Tibet.

After listening attentively to Tashi Tsering, the Dalai Lama replied that he himself had thought of most of the ideas that Tashi had just expressed and that he appreciated his advice, but that he did not believe not that the timing is right. Tashi Tsering was neither surprised nor discouraged, but satisfied that he was able to express what he had in mind and that the Dalai Lama listened attentively.

== The struggle for education and defense of the Tibetan language ==
In 2003, Tashi Tsering published his second work, co-authored by William Siebenschuch, on his struggle for education, under the title The struggle for education in modern Tibet: the three thousand children of Tashi Tsering.

In 2007, he spoke to the deputies of the autonomous region of Tibet to protest the too little place given to the Tibetan language in higher education and in the administration. In his opinion, schools in Tibet should teach all subjects, including modern science and technology, in Tibetan, to preserve the language.

In his official statement submitted to the Tibet Autonomous Region People's Congress in 2007, he wrote:

the use of Tibetan in schools and the establishment of an education system for The study of the Tibetan language is not only essential for cultivating progressive thinking and talent among people, but also embodies the most fundamental human right of the Tibetan people, it is the foundation on which equality among minorities ethnic can be achieved

.

== Death ==
Tashi Tsering died on 5 December 2014, in Lhasa, at the age of 85.

== Works ==
- With William Siebenschuh, and Melvyn Goldstein, The Struggle for Modern Tibet: The Autobiography of Tashi Tsering, Armonk, N.Y., M. E. Sharpe, Inc., 1997, xi + 207 p. ISBN 0-7656-0509-0, 9780765605092 – Chinese Edition of The Struggle for a Modern Tibet: the Life of Tashi Tsering, Mirror Books, Carle Place, N.Y., 2000.
- With William Siebenschuch, The struggle for education in modern Tibet: the three thousand children of Tashi Tsering, Volume 88 of Mellen studies in education, E. Mellen Press, 2003, ISBN 0773465790, 9780773465794
