= Van Maanen =

Van Maanen is a Dutch toponymic surname meaning "from Manen", a former town in Gelderland now part of Ede. Variants include Van Manen and Van Maenen. People with this name include:

- Adriaan van Maanen (1884–1946), Dutch-American astronomer
- Cornelis Felix van Maanen (1769–1849), Dutch minister and jurist
- Gregory Van Maanen (born 1937), American painter and Vietnam war veteran
- Harold Van Maanen (born 1928), American (Iowa) politician
- John Van Maanen (born 1943), American professor of management
- Willem G. van Maanen (1920–2012), Dutch journalist and writer

== See also ==
- Van Maanen (crater), a lunar crater named after Adriaan van Maanen
- Van Maanen's Star, a white dwarf discovered by Adriaan van Maanen
- Van Maanen (family), Dutch patrician family, descendants of Wouter van Maanen (*c.1625)
