= Institute for Comparative Research in Human Culture =

Humanities research center in Oslo, Norway

The Institute for Comparative Research in Human Culture (Norwegian: Instituttet for sammenlignende kulturforskning) is a humanities research institute based in Oslo, Norway.

It was established in 1922 by Fredrik Stang. An independent institute, its task is to sponsor research mainly in the fields of comparative linguistics, folklore, religion, ethnology, archaeology and ethnography. It shares localities with the Norwegian Academy of Science and Letters.

The board of directors consists of Per Kværne (chair), Arne Bugge Amundsen, Ivar Børklund, Tove Fjell, Ingar Kaldal, Svein Mønnesland and Aud Talle. At any given time, three of the board members are appointed by the Norwegian Academy of Science and Letters; the other four are appointed by the universities of Oslo, Bergen, Trondheim and Tromsø respectively.
