= Rindü Township =

Village in Tibet Autonomous Region, China

Rindü Township 仁堆乡
- Township
- Interactive map of Rindü Township
- Coordinates: 30°04′45″N 89°06′12″E
- Country: China
- Administrative District: Namling County
- Number of Administered Villages: 3
- Administrative Division Code: 54 02 21 213
- Time zone: UTC+8 (Beijing Time)
- Area code: +86

Rindü (Tibetan: རིན་འདུས་) is a village and township in the Tibet Autonomous Region of China. It is under the jurisdiction of Namling County, Shigatse City in the Tibet Autonomous Region. It is located in the northwest of Nanmulin County.

== Administrative divisions ==
Rindü Township governs the areas of Jiwu Village, Pula Village and Luoza Village.

== Transportation ==
The town is connected to National Highway 562.

== See also ==
- List of towns and villages in Tibet
