= Ethnogeography =

Ethnogeography or Ethnic Geography (ἔθνος + γεωγραφία) is the scientific study of the geographic distribution of ethnic groups. Ethnogeography is related to geography in the broad sense by its study of the influence of human activity and of ethnic entities as a whole.
