= Dobrnja, Banja Luka =

Dobrnja Добрња (Serbian)
- Village (Selo)
- Location within Bosnia and Herzegovina
- Coordinates: 44°39′19″N 17°02′19″E
- Country: Bosnia and Herzegovina
- Entity: Republika Srpska
- Municipality: Banja Luka

Population (2013)
  - Total: 74
- Time zone: UTC+1 (CET)
  - Summer (DST): UTC+2 (CEST)

Dobrnja (Serbian Cyrillic: Добрња) is a village in the municipality of Banja Luka, Republika Srpska, Bosnia and Herzegovina.

== Demographics ==
Ethnic groups in the village include:

- 74 Serbs (100%)
