= Escape from Tibet =

- DVD booklet used in the European German-speaking countries
- German: Wie zwischen Himmel und Erde
- Directed by: Maria Blumencron
- Written by: Maria Blumencron; Karl-Dietmar Möller-Naß
- Produced by: Jörg Bundschuh; Markus Fischer; Franz Hirner; Pit Riethmüller
- Starring: Hannah Herzsprung, Yangzom Brauen, Carlos Leal
- Cinematography: Brian D. Goff; Jörg Schmidt-Reitwein
- Music by: Peter Scherrer
- Distributed by: Global Screen GmbH
- Release date: 12 May 2012
- Running time: 105 minutes
- Country: Switzerland
- Languages: Tibetan, German, Mandarin

Escape from Tibet (German: Wie zwischen Himmel und Erde; lit. 'Like between Heaven and Earth') is a 2012 Swiss-German-Tibetan Drama film.

== Plot ==
On the roofs of a Tibetan monastery two boys let fly a kite, but suddenly a shot rips the relaxed silence, and one of the two boys gets shot, the "Golden Boy" which is the fictitious successor to the Dalai Lama. The monks act immediately and bring him out of Tibet to secure his body. In the meantime, the Berlinese mountaineer Johanna and her Swiss friend travel to the monastery to stay there for some days. The monks are convinced that Tempa is also close to death by the Chinese government because the orphaned boy was involved as a witness into the assassination. So Johanna is asked by the monks to refuge Tempa and other child refugees to their destination, the Tibetan capital Lhasa. Problems with the Chinese authorities occur, and Johanna decides to support Tashi, a refugee helpers, and to bring a group of children and Dolma, a widowed Tibetan woman, through the Chinese border controls to the Dalai Lama's residence towards Himachal Pradesh state in Northern India. But Johanna and Meto, a former nun, are captured by the Chinese border controls, and Meto is tortured by the soldiers to betray where the boy is hidden. In the meanwhile, Johanna gets back to the group of refugees ...

== Cast ==
- Hannah Herzsprung as Johanna
- David Lee McInnis as Tashi
- Sangay Jäger as Tempa
- Lucas Kwan Peterson as Major Wang Bao
- Yangzom Brauen as Dolma
- Pema Shitsetsang as Meto
- Carlos Leal as Jean-Francois
- Mona Petri as Florence

== Reception ==
The Swiss cinema website cineman described it as "gripping, fateful, human."

== Production ==
Escape from Tibet was filmed at locations in India, Germany and Switzerland at the Eiger glacier, and was produced also by the participation of the Swiss television SRF. It premiered on 31 May 2012 in Switzerland, on 19 July 2012 in Germany, and on 17 May 2013 in Taiwan. On SRF 1 it was shown for the first time on 4 February 2015, and on 16 March 2015 on the German television channel einsfestival. For international use, the original title may refer to Escape from Tibet and Flucht aus Tibet.

== Release ==
The film was released under the title Flucht aus Tibet - Wie zwischen Himmel und Erde in the DVD format (RC2) on 6 December 2012. The home release includes the language version in German in Dolby Digital 5.1.
