= Tibetology =

Study of things related to Tibet

Tibetology (Tibetan: བོད་རིག་པ།, Wylie: bod-rig-pa) refers to the study of things related to Tibet, including its history, religion, language, culture, politics and the collection of Tibetan articles of historical, cultural and religious significance. The last may mean a collection of Tibetan statues, shrines, Buddhist icons and holy scripts, Thangka embroideries, paintings and tapestries, jewellery, masks and other objects of fine Tibetan art and craftsmanship.

== History ==
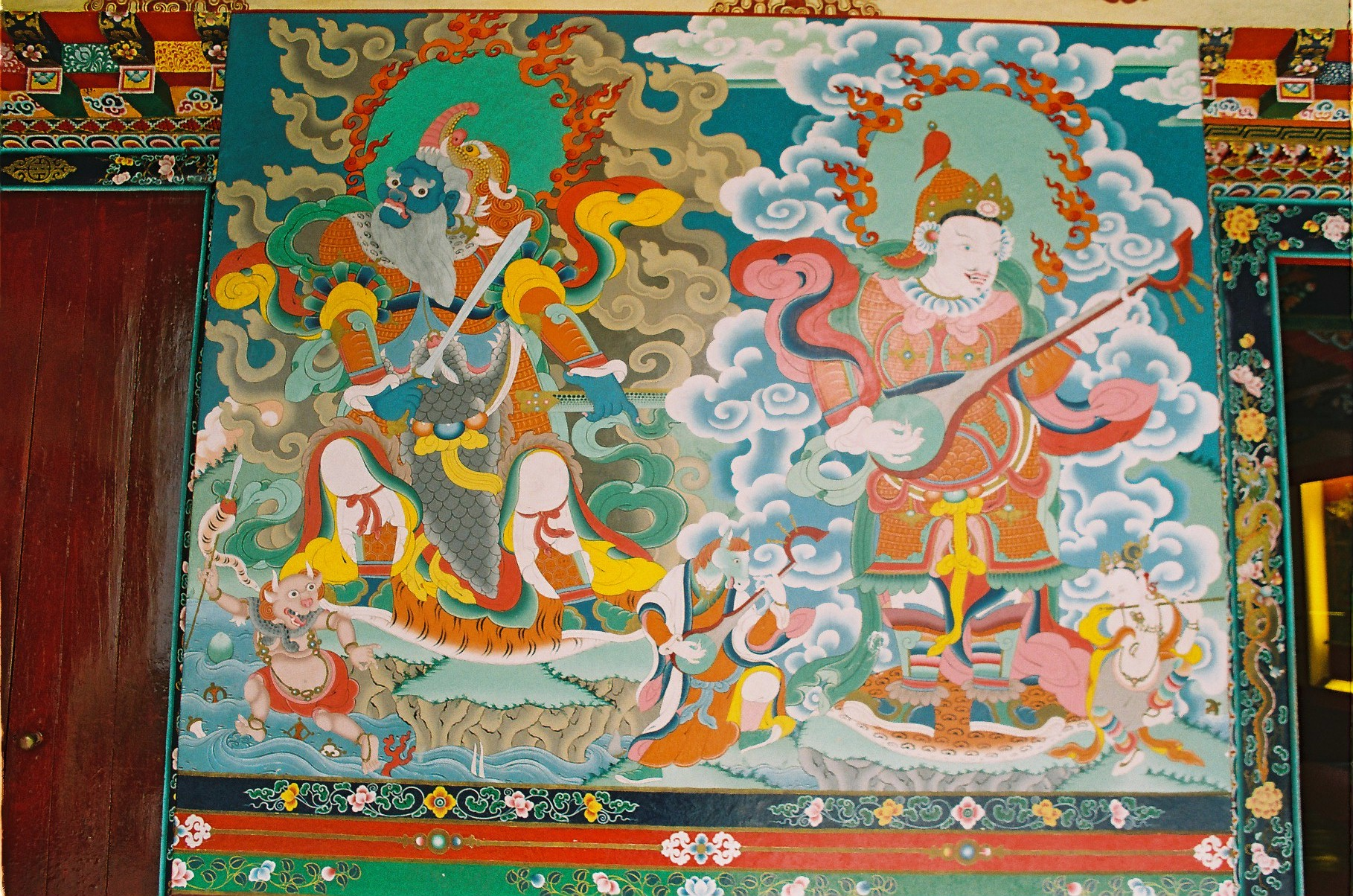
A Thanka painting inside the Namgyal Institute of Tibetology, in Gangtok

The Jesuit Antonio de Andrade (1580–1634) and a few others established a small mission and church in Tsaparang (1626), in the kingdom of Guge (Western Tibet) in the 17th century. When the kingdom was overrun by the king of Ladakh (1631), the mission was destroyed.

A century later another Jesuit, the Italian Ippolito Desideri (1684–1733) was sent to Tibet and received permission to stay in Lhasa where he spent 5 years (1716–1721) living in a Tibetan monastery, studying the language, the religion of the lamas and other Tibetan customs. He published a couple of books in Tibetan on Christian doctrine. Because of a conflict of jurisdiction (the mission was entrusted to the Capuchins, and not to the Jesuits) Desideri had to leave Tibet and returned to Italy, where he spent the rest of his life publishing his Historical notes on Tibet. They were collected, in 4 volumes, under the title of Opere Tibetane (Rome;1981–1989). Desideri may be considered as the first Tibetologist and he did much to make Tibet known in Europe.

Desideri was however a pioneer, and as such what he produced were rather 'observations' on Tibet, a work he did with objectivity and sympathy, but not always perfect accuracy. The inception of Tibetology as an authentic academic discipline is thus associated with the Hungarian Sándor Kőrösi Csoma (1784–1842) who is considered as its founder to present day, the other early Tibetologists of note being Philippe Édouard Foucaux who in 1842 occupied the first chair for Tibetan studies in Europe (Note: At the school of Oriental Studies in Paris. See:Le Calloc'h, Bernard. "Philippe-Edouard Foucaux: First Tibetan teacher in Europe." Tibet Journal 12.1 (1987): 39-49.) and Isaac Jacob Schmidt, who was primarily the pioneering mongolist residing in Saint Petersburg.

The publications of the British diplomat Charles Alfred Bell contributed towards the establishment of Tibetology as an academic discipline. Outstanding Tibetologists of the 20th century include the British Frederick William Thomas, David Snellgrove, Michael Aris, and Richard Keith Sprigg, the Italians Giuseppe Tucci and Luciano Petech, the Frenchmen Jacques Bacot and Rolf Alfred Stein, the Dutchman Johan van Manen, and finally the Germans Dieter Schuh and Klaus Sagaster.

In recent decades, particularly in English-speaking countries, the study of Tibet and Tibetology has opened out towards other disciplines, prompting works with an interdisciplinary approach. This has become most obvious in the regular conferences of the IATS (International Association of Tibetan Studies), held at intervals of three years in different cities around the world. Examples of such broader-based research include the work of the American anthropologist Melvyn Goldstein, among others, who has produced publications on subjects such as lexical questions, Tibetan nomadism, and the modern history of Tibet. Other recent research includes the work of Robert Barnett, Matthew Kapstein, Elliot Sperling, Alex McKay, Geoffrey Samuel, Flavio Geisshuesler, among others.

== Gallery ==
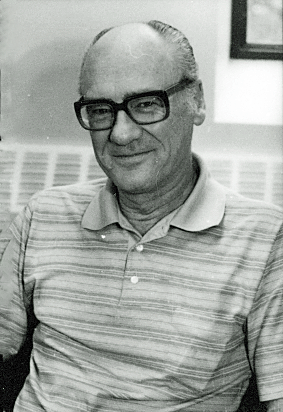
Professor Turrell Wylie in 1979 at the University of Washington Department of Asian Languages and Literature

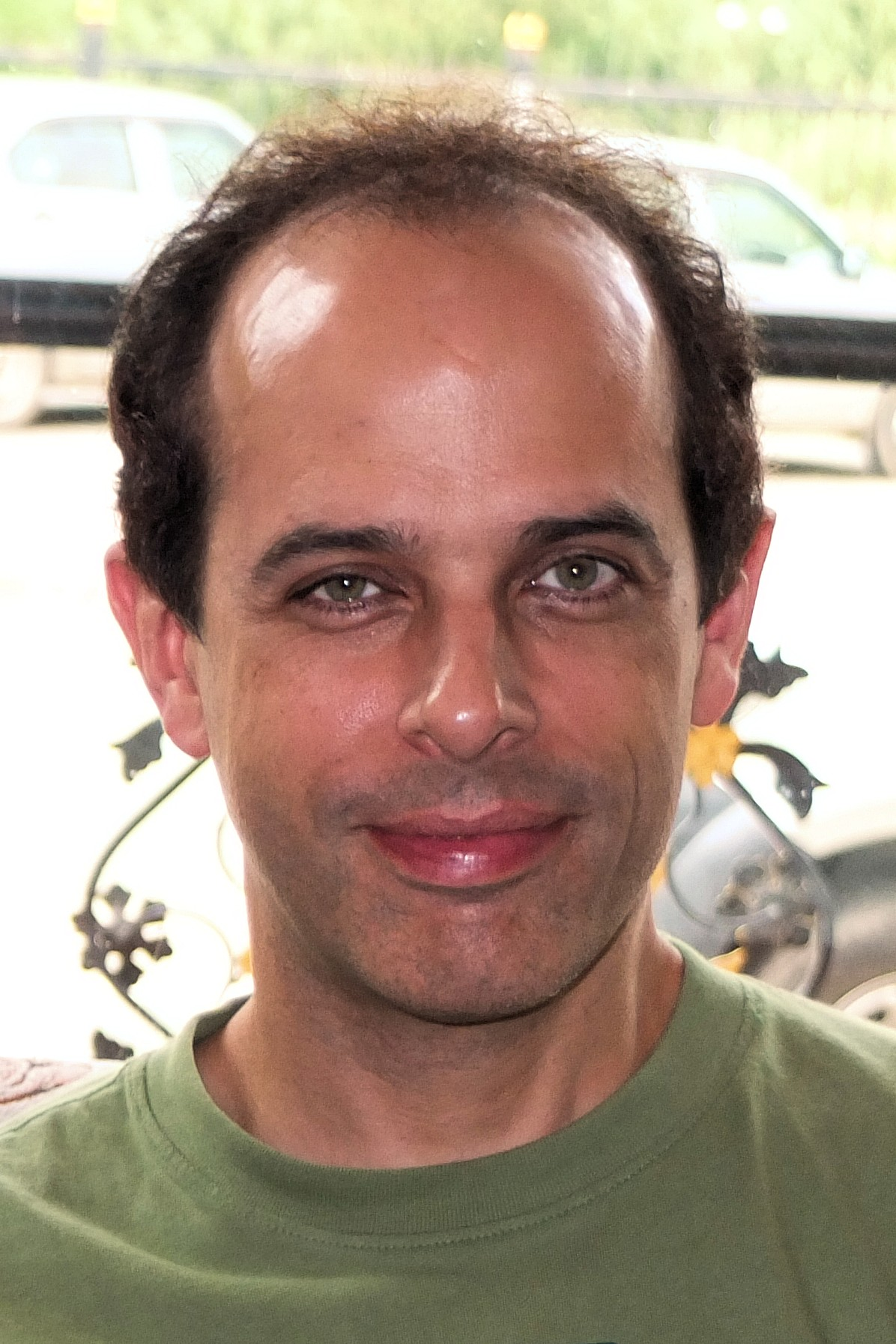
David Germano in 2013

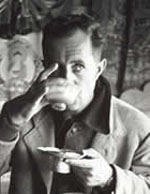
Giuseppe Tucci (1894-1984) Italian Tibetologist drinking butter tea in Tibet in the 1930s

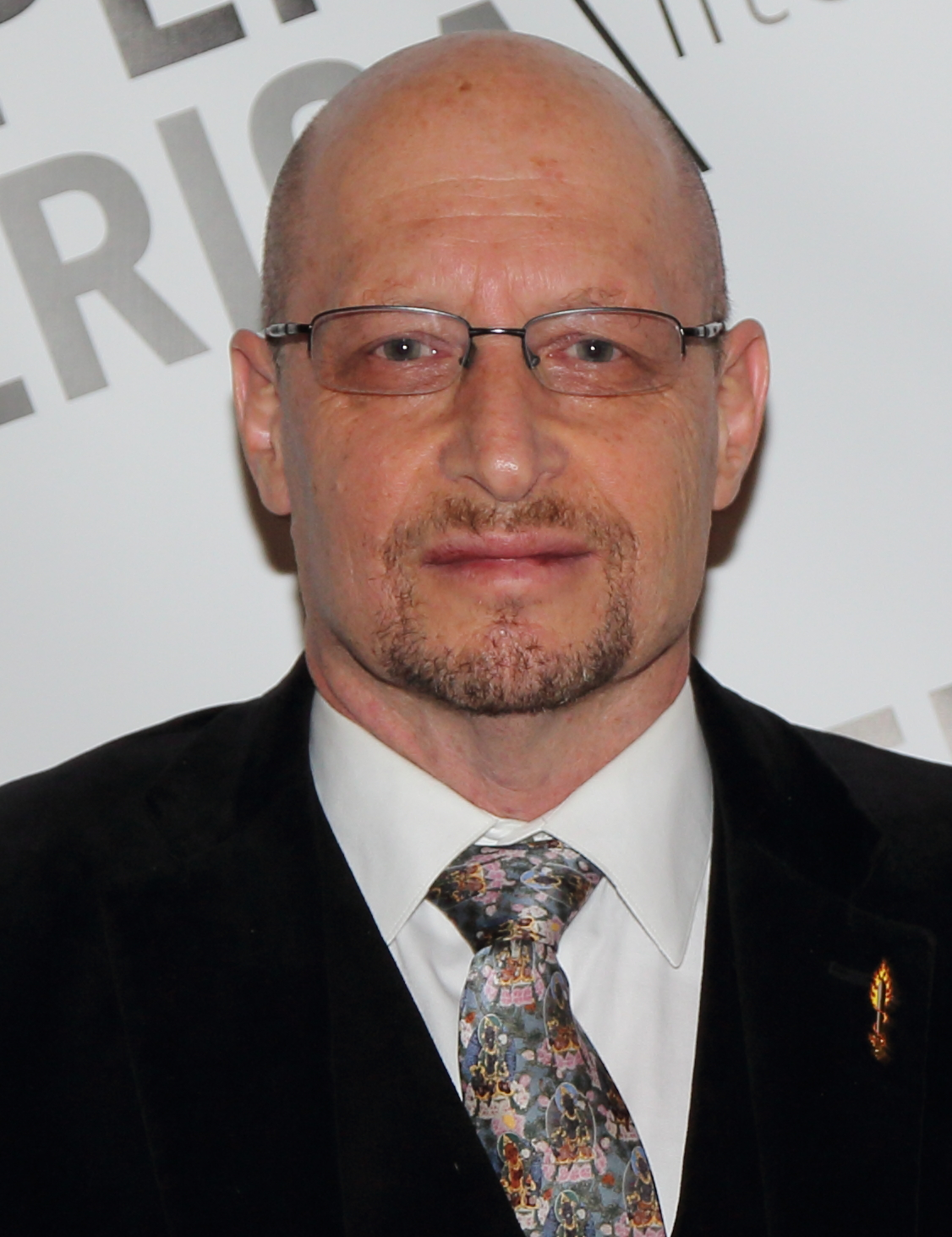
Elliot Sperling in 2014

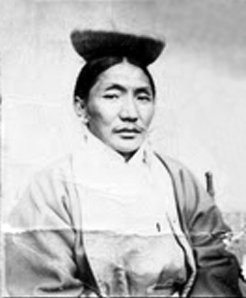
Shakabpa on the Tibetan Passport 1947 issued to Wangchuk Deden Shakabpa (Tibetan: ཞྭ་སྒབ་པ་དབང་ཕྱུག་བདེ་ལྡན།), then "Chief of the Finance Department of the Government of Tibet"

Sir Charles Alfred Bell, Author of the "Biography of the Dalai Lama" about the 13th Dalai Lama

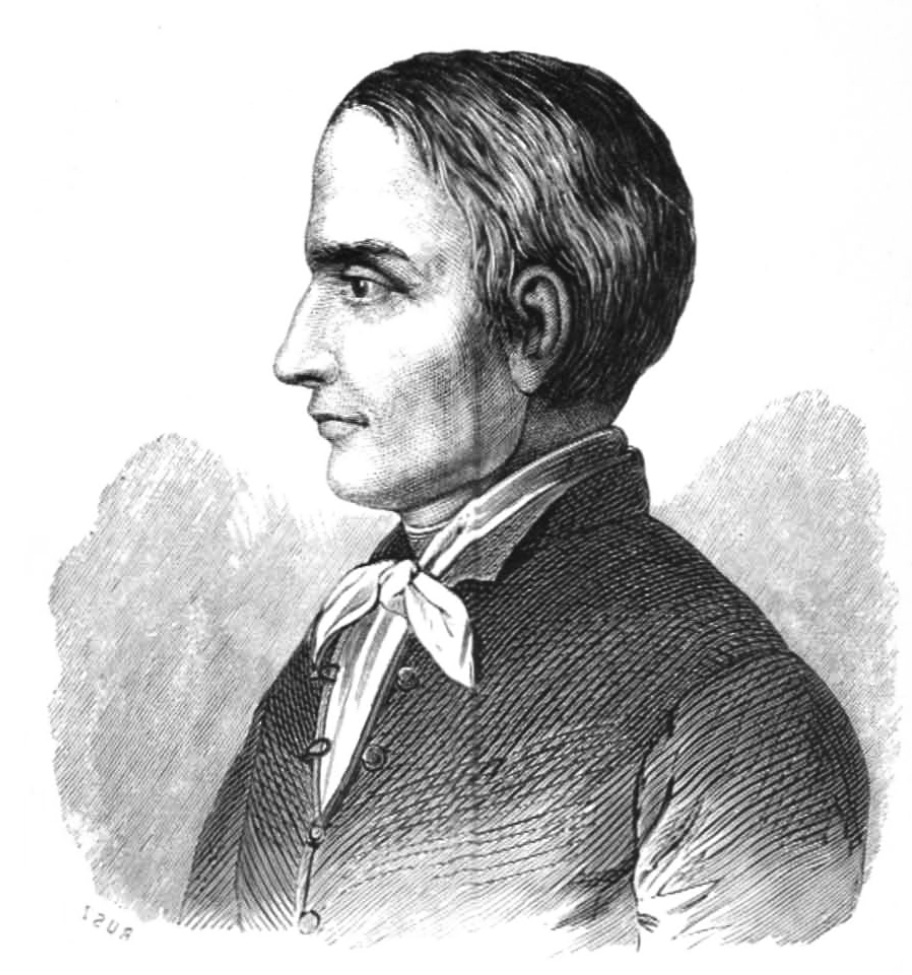
Sándor Kőrösi Csoma authored the first Tibetan-English dictionary

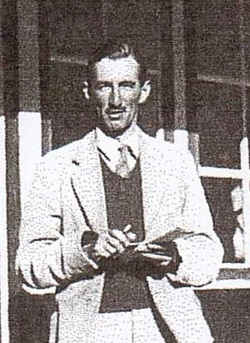
Hugh Richardson in Tibet about 1940

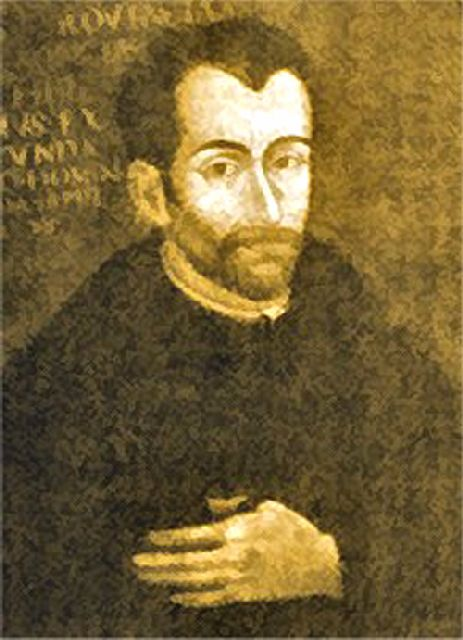
The Jesuit priest Antonio de Andrade (1580 - 1634) was the first known European to have visited Tibet

== See also ==
- Buddhist Digital Resource Center
- China Tibetology Research Center
- International Seminar of Young Tibetologists
- Vajrayana Buddhism
