= Svein Mønnesland =

Norwegian Slavist (1943–2026)

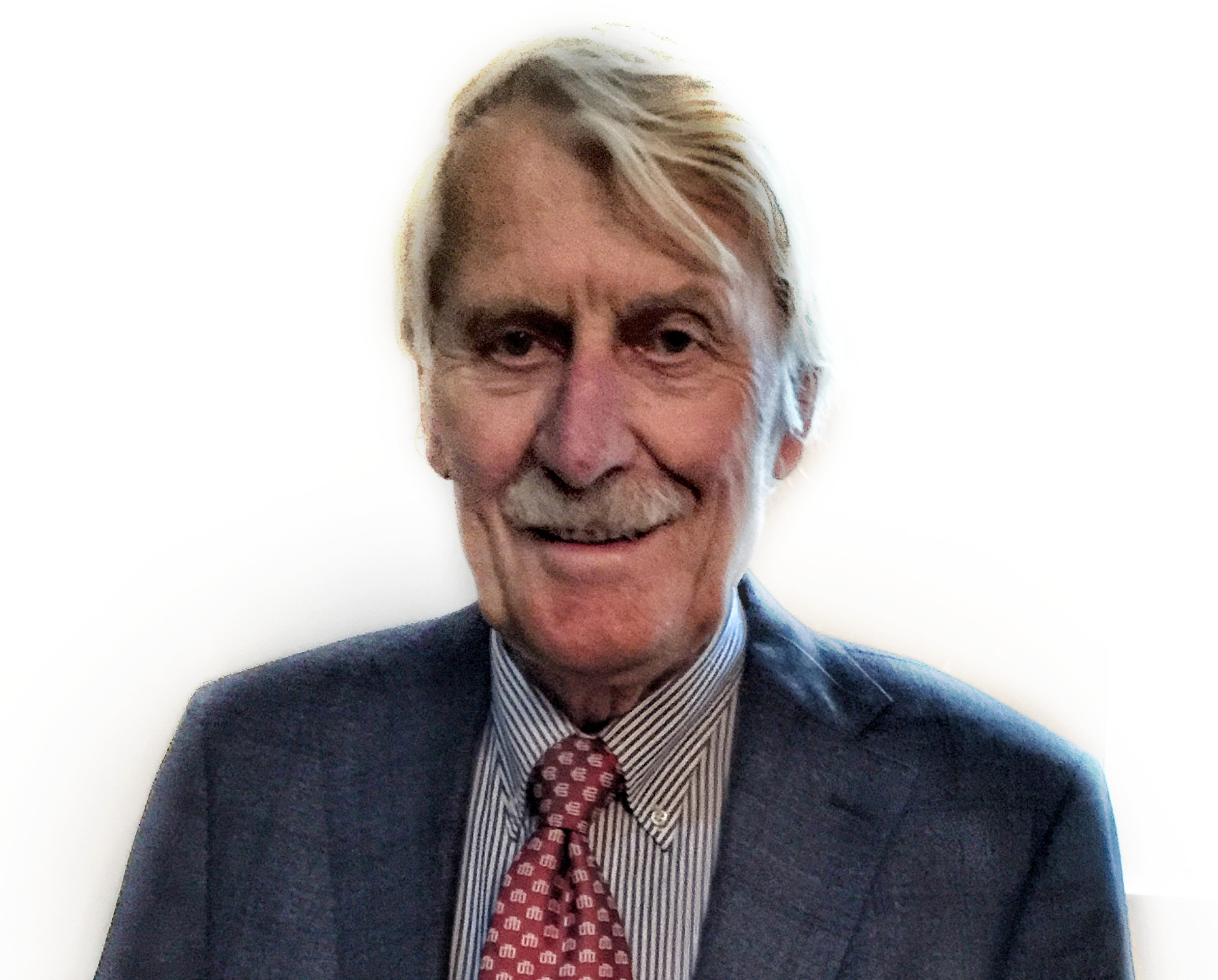
Svein Karl Mønnesland

Svein Karl Mønnesland (26 October 1943 – 23 August 2026) was a Norwegian linguist specialised in the Slavic languages.

== Life and career ==
Svein Karl Mønnesland was born in Skien on 26 October 1943. From 1979 he taught as a professor of Slavic languages at the University of Oslo. He was considered an expert in Serbo-Croatian (Bosnian, Croatian and Serbian), and has written numerous books and articles on Serbo-Croatian, Slavic linguistics, literature and cultural history. However, his approach to the South Slavic languages has been met with criticism. He has held a variety of positions, including that of the Nordic representative of the International Committee for Eastern Europe Research and on the Board of the Institute for Comparative Cultural Research. He was a member of the Norwegian Academy of Science and Letters and the Academy of Sciences and Arts of Bosnia and Herzegovina.

Mønnesland died on 23 August 2026, at the age of 82.

== Works ==
- Serbia in the 19th century seen by foreigners. 2016. Novi Sad: Prometej.
- A town in Europe through 2,400 years: Stari Grad (Pharos) on Hvar. Sypress: 2016.
- Lær kroatisk! 2014. Oslo: Sypress.
- National Symbols in Multi-National States. 2013. Oslo: Sypress.
- Bosansko-turski rječnik. Nuhamed Hevai Uskufi. 2012. Tuzla: Općina Tuzla.
- Dalmatia through foreign eyes, 2011. Zagreb: Fidipid.
- Jezik u Bosni i Hercegovini. 2005. Sarajevo: Institut za jezik.
- Bosnisk-kroatisk-serbisk grammatikk. 2002: Sypress.
- 1001 days. Bosnia and Herzegovina in pictures and words. 2001. Oslo: Sypress.
- Land ohne Wiederkehr. Ex-Jugoslawien: Die Wurzeln des Krieges. Klagenfurt: Wieder Verlag, 1997.
- Bosnia-Herzegovina. Oslo: Sypress, 1994.
- Kosovo. Oslo: Sypress, 1994.
- Før Jugoslavia, og etter. Oslo: Sypress. 1992 (5. utg. 2006).
- Norsk-bosnisk/kroatisk/serbisk ordbok. Oslo: Universitetsforlaget, 2001.
- Hajdemo u Jugoslaviju. Oslo: Universitetsforlaget, 1986.

Translations

- Jugoslavisk kvartett. Oslo. Samlaget, 1968.
- Nattergal og våpengny. Oslo. Samlaget, 1971.
- Vasko Popa: Den flammende ulvinnen. Solum, 1978.
- Danilo Kiš: Et gravmæle for Boris Davidovits. Aschehoug, 1984.
- Franc Šetinc: Adam Gabrijel. Grøndahl & Søn, 1987.
- Aleksander Tišma: Bruk av mennesket. Gyldendal, 1988.
- Rezak Hukanović: Helvetets tiende port. Sypress: 1993.
- Goran Simić: Sarajevos sorg, Sypress, 1994.
- Aleksander Tišma: Kapo. Gyldendal: 1995
- Nura Bazdulj-Hubiar: Kjærligheten er en sihirbaz. Sypress: 1996.
- Aleksander Tišma: Blams bok, Gyldendal, 1999.
- Aleksander Tišma: Troskap og utroskap. Gyldendal, 2003.
- Munib Delalić: Bare storm og solnedgang tok jeg med fra Hercegovina. Andresen & Butenschøn, 2009.
- Goce Smilevski: Sigmund Freuds søster. Gyldendal, 2013.
