= Charles Ramble =

British anthropologist

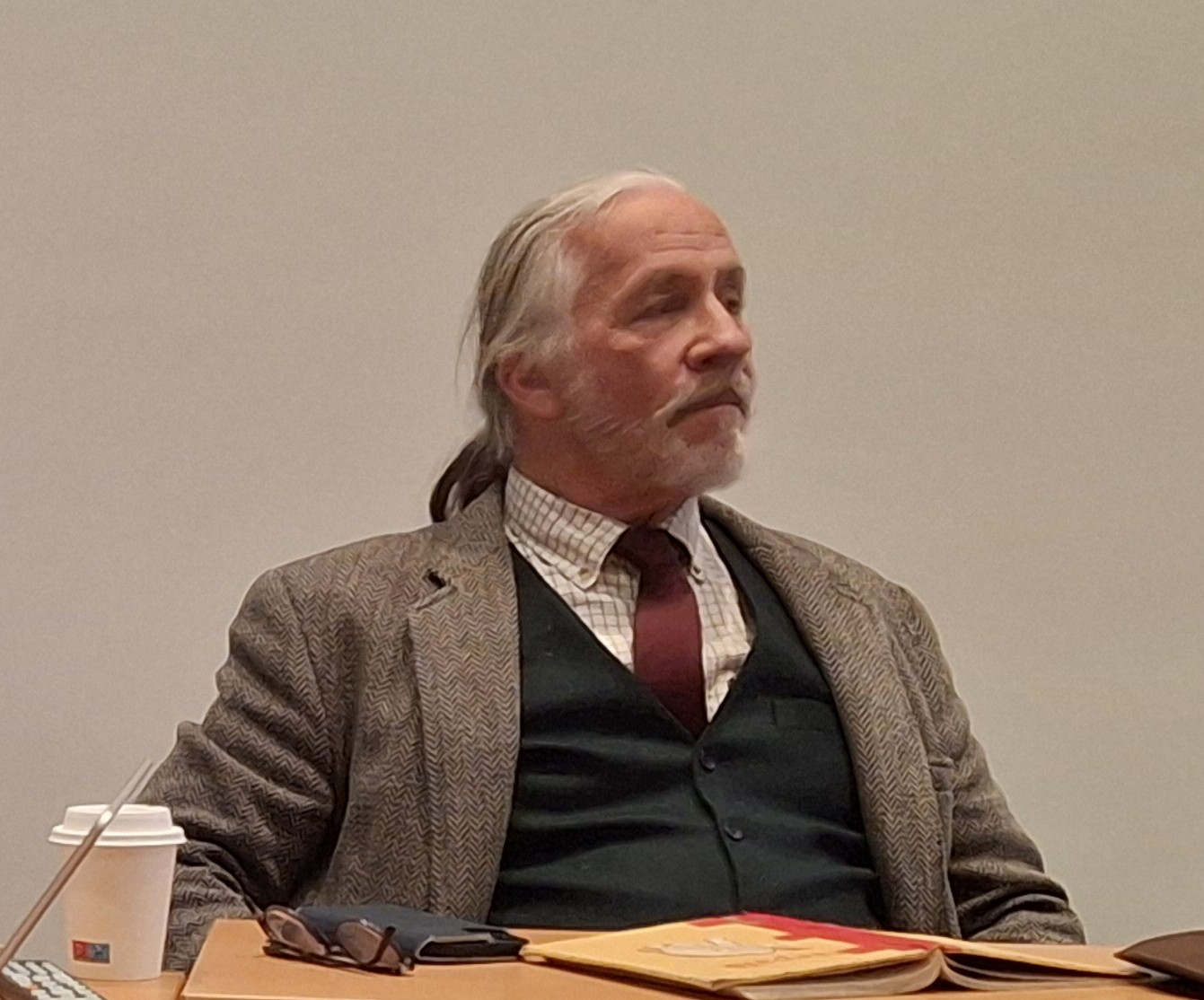
Charles Ramble in Paris in 2026

Charles Albert Edward Ramble (born 1957) is an anthropologist and former University Lecturer in Tibetan and Himalayan Studies at the Oriental Institute, Oxford University. Since 2009 he has been Professor and Directeur d'études (Histoire et philologie tibétaines) at the Ecole pratique des hautes études (EPHE, Sorbonne), Paris. Between 2006 and 2013 he was elected president of the International Association for Tibetan Studies (IATS) and convened the 10th seminar of IATS at Oxford in 2003.

Dr. Ramble spent over 15 years in Nepal and Tibet, and has published several books and articles related to his main research interests: pilgrimage, the Bön religion, Himalayan civil religion and social history, and historical ethnography and social history of Nepal’s Mustang district. He is married to the French anthropologist Dr Anne de Sales (CNRS Nanterre), who also specializes on Nepal; together they have two adult daughters.

== Publications ==
- 1980 "Recent books on Tibet and the Buddhist Himalaya", Journal of the Anthropological Society of Oxford 11(2).
- 1982 "Status and death: mortuary rites and attitudes to the body in a Tibetan village", Kailash 9, 333-59.
- 1983 "The founding of a Tibetan village: the popular transformation of history", Kailash 10(3-4), 267-90.
- 1985 "Buddhist people of the north Nepal borderland", in S. J. Locke (ed.): The Buddhist Heritage of Nepal, Kathmandu: Dharmodaya Sabba.
- 1987a (with M. Vinding) "The 'Bem-chag village record and the early history of Mustang District", Kailash 13(1-2), 5-48.
- 1987b "The Muktinath Yartung: a Tibetan harvest festival in its social and historical context", L'Ethnographie 83(100-101), 221-25.
- 1990a "The headman as a force for cultural conservation: the case of the Tepas of Nepal", in N.K. Rustomji and C. Ramble (eds): Himalayan Environment and Culture, Shimla: Indian Institute of Advanced Study.
- 1990b "How Buddhist are Buddhist communities? The construction of tradition in two lamaist villages", Journal of the Anthropological Society of Oxford 21(2), 185-97.
- 1992-93 "A ritual of political unity in an old Nepalese kingdom", Ancient Nepal nos. 130-133.
- 1993a "Rule by play in southern Mustang", in Charles Ramble and Martin Brauen (eds): Anthropology of Tibet and the Himalaya, Zurich: Ethnological Museum of the University of Zurich.
- 1993b *"Reflections of a plant-hunter in Nepal: an interview with Dr. Tirtha Bahadur Shrestha", European Bulletin of Himalayan Research no. 5.
- 1993c "Whither, indeed, the tsampa-eaters?" Himal September–October 1993.
- 1994a "Civic authority and agrarian management in southern Mustang: remarks on a nineteenth-century land-tax register from Kagbeni", Ancient Nepal no. 135.
- 1994b "Writings in Monochrome", Himal July–September 1994.
- 1995 "Gaining ground: representations of territory in Bon and Tibetan popular tradition." The Tibet Journal Spring 1995.
- 1995 (with C. Seeber) "Dead and living settlements in the Shod-yul of Mustang", Ancient Nepal no. 138.
- 1996a "Patterns of places", in A.-M. Blondeau and E. Steinkellner (eds): Reflections of the Mountain: essays on the history and social meaning of the mountain cult in Tibet and the Himalaya, Wien: Verlag der österreichischen Akademie der Wissenschaften.
- 1996b "Mustang, the ancient kingdom of Lo", Asian Art and Culture 9(3), Fall 1996 (special issue on the Himalayas).
- 1997a "The Creation of the Bon Mountain of Kongpo", in A.W. Macdonald (ed.): Mandala and Landscape, Delhi: D.K. Printworld.
- 1997b "Tibetan pride of place; or, why Nepal's Bhotes are not an ethnic group", in D. Gellner and J. Pfaff (eds): Politics and Ethnicity in a Hindu Kingdom, London: Harwood
- 1997c "Se: notes on the distribution of an archaic ethnonym in Tibet and Nepal", in S. Karmay and Ph. Sagant (eds): Les Habitants du Toit du Monde, Paris: Société d'Ethnologie, Nanterre.
- 1998a "The classification of territorial divinities in Pagan and Buddhist rituals of South Mustang", in A.-M. Blondeau (ed.): Tibetan Mountain Deities, their Cults and Representations, Wien: Verlag der österreichischen Akademie der Wissenschaften.
- 1998b (with John Harrison) "Houses and households in Southern Mustang", Ancient Nepal no. 140, 23-37.
- 1998c (with John Harrison) "Watermills in Mustang: notes on architecture, function and management", Ancient Nepal no. 140, 39-52.
- 1998d "The Mustang villages of Kag, Te and Khyinga: an introduction to history, ethnicity and the idea of place", Beiträge zur Allgemeinen und Vergleichenden Archäologie, Band 18, Mainz: Verlag Philipp von Zabern, 147-82.
- 1999 "A literary biography of Michael Aris", European Bulletin of Himalayan Research 17, 103-16.
- 2000 "The secular surroundings of a Bonpo ceremony: games, popular rituals and economic structures in the mDos-rgyab of Klu-brag monastery (Nepal)." In S. Karmay and Y. Nagano (eds): New Horizons in Bon Studies. Proceedings of a conference held in Osaka, August 1999. Osaka: National Museum of Ethnology.
- 2001a "Art without artists: Robert Powell’s Mustang collection." In M. Oppitz (ed.), Robert Powell: Himalayan Drawings. Zurich: Völkerkundemuseum der Universität Zürich.
- 2001b (With P. Boyer) "Cognitive templates for religious concepts: cross-cultural evidence for recall of counter-intuitive representations." Cognitive Science 25 (4).
- 2001c "Household organisation and hierarchy in Kagbeni: the limits to cultural revival in a changing society." In P. Pohle and W. Haffner (eds): Kagbeni—Contributions to the Village’s History and Geography. Giessen: Giessener Geographische Schriften 77.
- 2001d "The old sector system of Kagbeni: notes on the history of land use and social organisation." In P. Pohle and W. Haffner (eds): Kagbeni—Contributions to the Village’s History and Geography. Giessen: Giessener Geographische Schriften 77
- 2002a The Victory Song of Porong. In K. Buffetrille and H. Diemberger (eds), Territory and Identity in Tibet and the Himalayas. Leiden: Brill.
- 2002b Temporal disjunction and collectivity in Mustang, Nepal. Current Anthropology 43, supplement, August–October.
- 2003a (With M. Kind) Bonpo monasteries and temples of the Himalayan region. In S.G. Karmay and Y. Nagano, eds, A Survey of Bonpo Monasteries in the Himalaya. Osaka: National Museum of Ethnology.
- 2003b (With N. Gutschow) "Up and down, inside and out: notions of space and territory in Tibetan villages of Mustang, Nepal." N. Gutschow, A. Michaels and C. Ramble (eds): Sacred Landscape in the Himalaya. Wien: Verlag der Österreichischen Akademie der Wissenschaften.
- 2005 (with Geshe Gelek Jinpa et al.). Sacred Landscape and Pilgrimage in Tibet: in Search of the Lost Kingdom of Bön. New York: Abeville Press.
- 2006 "Sacral kings and divine sovereigns: principles of Tibetan monarchy in theory and practice." In D. Sneath (ed.): Power, Place and the Subject in Inner Asia. Bellingham/Cambridge: Western Washington University.
- 2007 The Navel of the Demoness: Tibetan Buddhism and Civil Religion in Highland Nepal. New York: Oxford University Press.
- 2008 Tibetan Sources for a Social History of Mustang, Nepal. Volume 1: the Archive of Te. Halle: International Institute for Tibetan and Buddhist Studies.
- 2010a "History from below: an introduction to three archival collections from Mustang, Nepal." In H. Diemberger and K. Phuntso (eds): Ancient Treasures, New Discoveries. Halle: International Institute for Tibetan and Buddhist Studies.
- 2013a "The contractor, the duke, the prime minister and the villagers: exploitation and resistance in nineteenth-century rural Nepal." In T. Lewis and B.M. Owens (eds): Sucāruvādadeśika: A Festschrift Honoring Professor Theodore Riccardi. Kathmandu: Himal Books.
- 2013b "The complexity of Tibetan pilgrimage." In M. Deeg (ed.): Buddhist Pilgrimage in History and Present Times. Lumbini: Lumbini International Research Institute.
- 2013c "Hidden Himalayan transcripts: strategies of social opposition in Mustang (Nepal), 19th–20th centuries." In C.
- 2013d Ramble, P. Schwieger and A. Travers (eds): Tibetans who Escaped the Historian’s Net: Contributions to the Social History of Tibetan-speaking Regions. Kathmandu: Vajra Books.
