= Yangzom Brauen =

Swiss actress, activist and writer

Yangzom Brauen (born 18 April 1980) is a Swiss actress, director, activist and writer.

== Life and work ==
Brauen, the daughter of Swiss ethnologist Martin Brauen and Tibetan artist Sonam Dolma Brauen, started her acting career with small roles in Swiss television series. She had her Hollywood debut in the film Aeon Flux in the role of Inari. Since then, she has played in various American independent productions including a minor role in Al Pacino's Salomaybe, an adaptation of Oscar Wilde's Salome and the leading part in the German film Asudem (2006) by Daryush Shokof.

In addition to her acting work, Brauen has drawn media attention with her public advocacy on behalf of the Tibetan people. In 1999, she co-organised demonstrations against Chinese leader Jiang Zemin's visit to Switzerland, and in 2001 a photograph of her being arrested in Moscow during a protest against the award of the 2008 Summer Olympics to Beijing was used in news reports worldwide.

Eisenvogel ("Iron Bird"), Brauen's account of her grandmother Kunsang's and her mother Sonam's escape from Tibet, and her own youth in exile, was published in 2009 and became a bestseller in Germany. It was later published in English as Across Many Mountains.

== Works ==
=== Filmography ===
Year	Film	Role	Notes
2000	Mannezimmer	Silvie Blum 3 episodes	TV
2001	Schluss mit lustig!	Maja	TV
2002	Usfahrt – Joy Ride	Lola	
2004	Heimkehr	Yanki	TV
2004	Oeschenen	Anna Graber	TV
2005	The Big One	Anna	
2005	Æon Flux	Inari	
2006	A2Z	Beautiful girl	
2006	Meine bezaubernde Nanny	Jane Fu	TV
2006	Asudem	Woman	
2008	Movin' In	Allie	
2009	Salomaybe	Slave	
2009	Cargo	Miyuki Yoshida	
2009	Pandorum	Elysium Second Lieutenant	
2009	Hallo Hollywood	21 episodes	TV
2009	The Mandala Maker	Miranda	
2010	Länger Leben	Jasmin	
2012	Escape from Tibet	Dolma	
2013	Who Killed Johnny	Bartender, Director	
2015	Born in Battle	Short movie	

=== Books ===
- Brauen, Yangzom (2009). Eisenvogel: drei Frauen aus Tibet; die Geschichte meiner Familie. München: Heyne. ISBN 978-3-453-16404-8.
  Published in English as:

- Across many mountains: three daughters of Tibet. London: Harvill Secker. 2011. ISBN 978-1-84655-344-8.
- Across Many Mountains: A Tibetan Family's Epic Journey from Oppression to Freedom. New York: St.Martins Press. 2011. ISBN 978-0312600136.
