= Sonam Dolma Brauen =

Tibetan-Swiss contemporary painter and sculptor

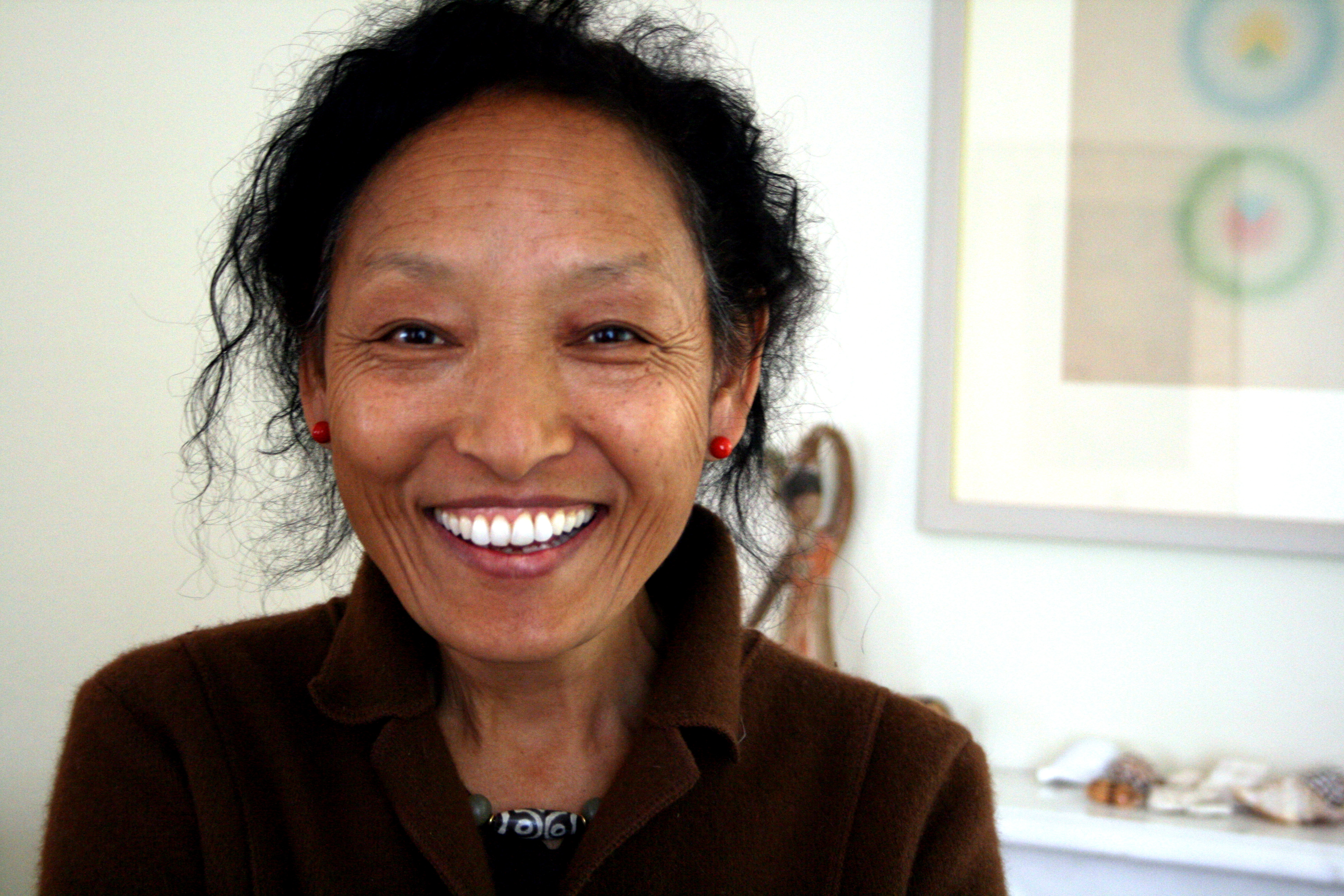
- Sonam Dolma Brauen at her studio in 2008
- Born: Sonam Dolma; 30 January 1953 (age 73); Kongpo, Tibet (now Kongpo, Tibetan Autonomous Region, China)
- Other name: Sonam Dolma Wangmo
- Education: Art School Bern
- Occupations: Contemporary painter, sculptor
- Years active: 1982–present
- Spouse: Martin Brauen
- Children: 2
- Website: www.sonambrauen.net

Sonam Dolma Brauen (born 1953) is a Tibetan-Swiss contemporary painter and sculptor.

== Life and career ==
=== Early life ===
Sonam Dolma was born in Kongpo, Tibet (today Kongpo, Gongbo'gyamda County, Nyingchi Prefecture, Tibetan Autonomous Region, China), the daughter of Kunsang (Mola) Wangmo, a former Bhikkhuni, and Tsering. The family left eastern Tibet when the 14th Dalai Lama refuged in 1959 to Dharamshala in northern India, crossing the Himalayas on foot. Sonam's father and her younger sister died on the journey. Sonam grew up in nearby Dharamsala, Shimla, Himachal Pradesh, during the Sino-Indian War. In autumn 1962, the family had to move to Mussoorie, Uttarakhand, where Sonam took a job waitressing in a Tibetan restaurant. One day she served tea to a Swiss man from Bern, an ethnologist who was fascinated by Tibetan culture. They fell in love, and married, and soon after, Martin Brauen took Sonam and her mother Kunsang back with him to Switzerland: I would never have decided for myself to leave if Martin had not come and asked me to marry him. Settled in Bern, she learnt Swiss-German. Now, everywhere Sonam goes, she brings with her tsa tsa (small Votive offerings in the Mahāyāna Buddhism) that her parents carried out from Tibet: They make us remember.

=== Education ===
Sonam Dolma Brauen began her training as artist at the Art School Bern and was educated by Arthur Freuler, Leopold Schropp, Mariann Bissegger, and Serge Fausto Sommer. She moved to New York City in 2008, where she lived for four years in Manhattan, New York City; her studio was located in Long Island City. Thenafter she stayed for a while in the USA, in Korea, Italy and went back to Switzerland.

=== Personal life ===
Married to the Swiss ethnologist Martin Brauen, Sonam Dolma's daughter Yangzom Brauen (born in 1981) is a Swiss-Tibetan actress, writer (Eisenvogel) and director (Who Killed Johnny). Eisenvogel ("Iron Bird"), her daughter's 2009 novel, is dedicated to Sonam Dolma's mother Kunsang and her escape from Tibet. The book tells about Yangzom's youth and their common life in exile, and became a bestseller in German-speaking countries. It was later published in English as Across Many Mountains. Sonam's son, Tashi Brauen, is also an artist.

== Work ==
Her paintings, sculptures and installations are exhibited in Germany, Italy, South Korea, Switzerland, USA and in Museum of Contemporary Tibetan Art, Netherlands.

=== Paintings ===
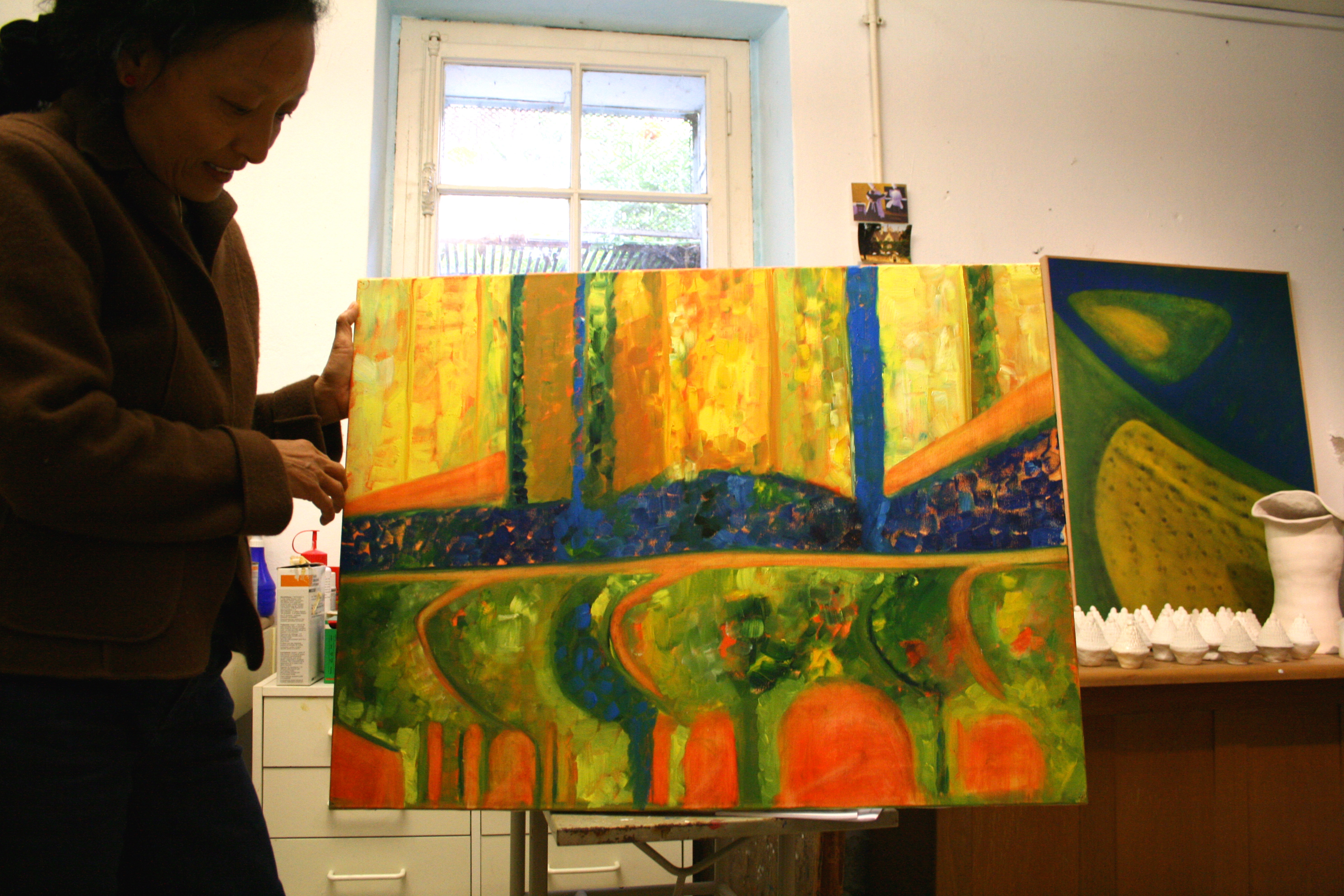
The artist and one of her 2008 paintings

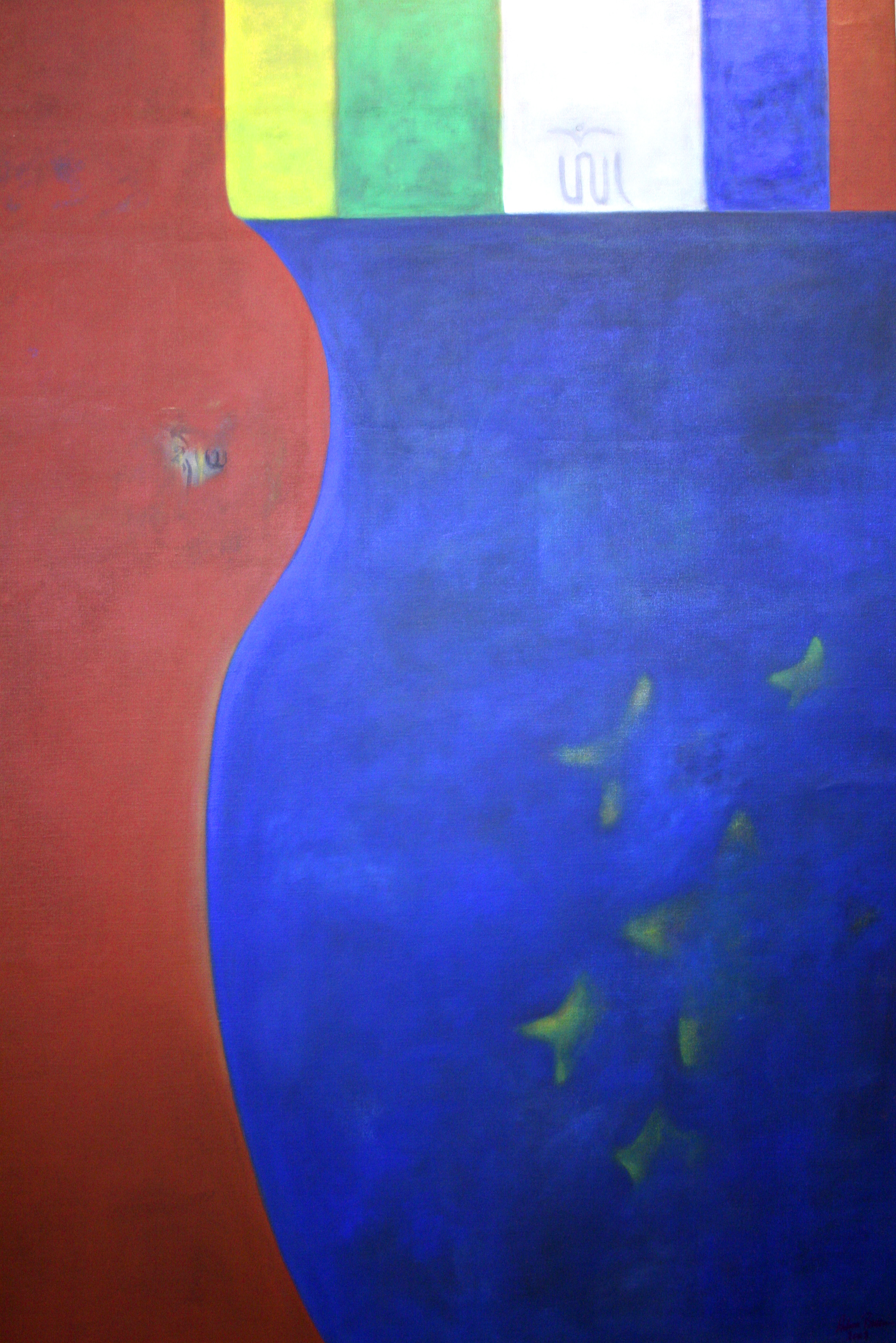
Painting by Sonam Dolma Brauen, 2008 "visionary artists for tibet" exhibition

Sonam Dolma Brauen's works is abstractly and has clear conceptions of her role as an “ethnic painter”, and is influenced of Buddhist concepts on her work. Her paintings represent the Tibetan Contemporary art.

=== Installations ===
After moving to New York City, Brauen began working more with installations using materials and objects like used monk robes from Asia, plaster, empty ammunition shells. Provocative works utilize teeth and used ammunition in pieces that comment on contemporary society. Her installations express ongoing themes that preoccupy her: Machoism and its relation to power, money and war; and the political situation in her home country Tibet.

=== Critics ===
The art scope magazine claims, one would think, given Dolma’s origins ... that her art would reflect overtly political or nationalist themes. Or that, being Tibetan-born, she would follow the traditional artistic mores of strict Buddhist iconography. Rather, Dolma’s wall-spanning acrylics and floor-spanning installations tackle a thoroughly rougher territory: the expanse of cultural folly and the crimes of emotion.
