= Johan van Manen =

Dutch orientalist (1877–1943)

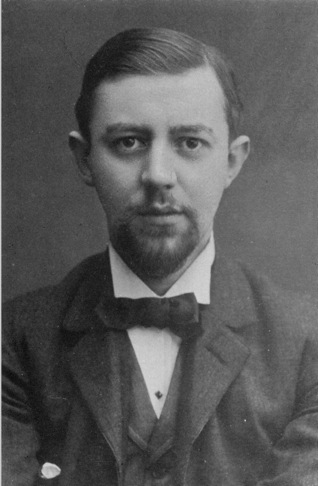
- Van Manen in 1898
- Born: 16 April 1877; Nijmegen, Netherlands
- Died: 17 March 1943 (aged 65); Calcutta, British Raj (modern-day Kolkata, India)

Mari Albert Johan van Manen (16 April 1877 – 17 March 1943) was a Dutch orientalist and the first Dutch Tibetologist. A large portion of his collected manuscripts and art and ethnographic projects now make up the Van Manen collection at Leiden University's Kern Institute.

== Career ==
Beginning in 1908 he resided at the Theosophical Society headquarters in Adyar, near Chennai, India, and worked as the secretary of C. W. Leadbeater. In 1908 he was appointed as assistant librarian at the Adyar Library.

From 1916 to 1918 he lived in Ghoom in the Darjeeling Himalayan hill region of northeastern India and studied Tibetan culture and language.

From 1919 until his death in 1943 he lived in Calcutta, working first as librarian for the Imperial Library and then as an assistant in the Indian Museum, as the General Secretary of the Royal Asiatic Society of Bengal, and finally, during the Second World War, as an official in the censor's office.

He died on 17 March 1943.
