= İbrahim Şâhidî =

İbrahim Şâhidî (1470–1550) was a Mawlawi Sufi master and scholar, the author of a famous Persian-Turkish rhymed vocabulary, Tuhfe-i Şâhidî (Gift of Şâhidî), in 1514–15, which was written "for schoolboys and beginning students receiving a Mawlawi education". According to Murat Umut Inan, his circle constituted "the second major Ottoman focus of Persian learning".

== Sources ==
- Birnbaum, Eleazar (2015). Ottoman Turkish and Çaĝatay MSS in Canada. ISBN 9789004284043.
- Green, Nile (2019). The Persianate World: The Frontiers of a Eurasian Lingua Franca. ISBN 9780520300927.
