= Martin Brauen =

Swiss cultural anthropologist

Martin Brauen (born 15 March 1948) is a cultural anthropologist from Bern, Switzerland who specialises in Tibet, the Himalayas and history of religions.

== Biography ==
Martin Brauen studied ethnology and religious history at the University of Zurich and Buddhology at the University of Delhi. He earned a doctorate after defending a thesis in Zurich on Holidays and ceremonies in Ladakh and a degree of Privatdozent (Habilitation in the field of anthropology of religions). Since 1975 he has had several positions at the Ethnographic Museum of the University of Zurich (Head of the "Himalaya, Tibet and the Far East" department, deputy director and director ad interim), as well as becoming a lecturer. From 2008 to 2012 he was chief curator at the Rubin Museum of Art in New York City.

Since then he is working as an independent curator: Kosmos – Rätsel der Menschheit (Museum Rietberg); Yak, Yetis, Yogis – Tibet im Comic (Museum Rietberg); Bill Viola: Passions (in the Cathedral of Berne); Cesar Ritz (old railway station Niederwald).

Brauen is the author of several books and many exhibitions on Tibet, Bhutan, Nepal, Ladakh, and Japan. Among his books, Mandala: Sacred Circle in Tibetan Buddhism is best known to the general public and has been translated into six languages. Well known is also his book Dreamworld Tibet – Western Illusions (in German: Traumwelt Tibet).

Martin Brauen has also produced several films and documentaries on Tibet and the Himalayas, and has worked in the areas of aid and development policy in a Swiss NGO (Brot für alle).

He met Tibetans for the first time in 1965 and the 14th Dalai Lama in 1970 during an interview, and has since been committed to the Tibetan cause. He is married to the Tibetan artist Sonam Dolma Brauen, with whom he had two children, actress and writer Yangzom Brauen and Tashi Brauen, artist.

The great-grandfather of Martin Brauen, Élie Ducommun who received the Nobel Peace Prize in 1902, was a notable pacifist.

== Publications ==
- 2014: Bill Viola: Passions (with Kathleen Bühler), Kunstmuseum Bern/Cathedral of Berne
- 2014: Kosmos – Weltentwürfe im Vergleich (with Albert Lutz et al.), Museum Rietberg Zürich/Verlag Scheidegger & Spiess AG, Zürich, ISBN 978-3-85881-451-7
- 2011: Quentin Roosevelt's China – Ancestral Realms of the Naxi (with Christine Mathieu and Cindy Ho), Rubin Museum of Art, New York / Arnoldsche Art Publishers, Stuttgart
- 2010: Grain of Emptiness – Buddhism-inspired contemporary art (with Mary Jane Jacob) Rubin Museum of Art, New York, ISBN 978-0-9772131-9-1
- 2009: Mandala – Sacred Circle in Tibetan Buddhism (with Helen Abbott) Arnoldsche /Rubin Museum of Art, Stuttgart/New York, ISBN 978-3-89790-305-0
- 2005: The Virtual Mandala – The Tibetan Book of the Dead/ Das tibetische Totenbuch (with Claudio Dal Pra), Art Adventures, Zürich, ISBN 3-9522726-7-1 (part 1), ISBN 978-3-9522726-8-8 (part 2)
- 2005: Die Dalai Lamas – Tibets Reinkarnationen des Bodhisattva Avalokiteshvara, Arnoldsche Art Publishers, Stuttgart,ISBN 3-89790-219-2
- 2005: The Dalai Lamas – A Visual History, Serindia, Publications, Chicago, ISBN 1-932476-22-9
- 2005: Les Dalaï-Lamas – Les 14 réincarnations du bodhisattva Avalokiteshvara, Favre, Lausanne, ISBN 2-8289-0840-2
- 2004: Mandala – Cercle sacré du bouddhisme tibétain, Favre, Lausanne, ISBN 2-8289-0772-4
- 2004: Dreamworld Tibet – Western Illusions, Weatherhill, Trumbull, ISBN 083-4805-464
- 2003: Bambus im alten Japan / Bamboo in Old Japan, Arnoldsche Art Publishers, Stuttgart, (with Patrizia Jirka-Schmitz) ISBN 3-89790-190-0
- 2002: Peter Aufschnaiter's Eight Years in Tibet, Orchid Press, Bangkok, ISBN 974-524-012-5
- 2000: Traumwelt Tibet – Westliche Trugbilder, Haupt, Bern-Stuttgart-Wien, ISBN 3-258-05639-0
- 2000: Deities of Tibetan Buddhism – The Zürich Paintings of the Icons Worthwhile to See (with Martin Willson), Wisdom Publications, Boston, ISBN 0-86171-098-3
- 1999: Mandala – Il cercio sacro del buddhismo tibetano, Sovera editore, ISBN 88-8124-074-2
- 1998: Mandala – Posvatny kruh tibetského buddhismu, Volvox Globator, Praha, ISBN 80-7207-145-9
- 1998: De Mandala – De heilige cirkel van het Tibetaans boeddhisme, Asoka, ISBN 90 5670 021 9
- 1997: The Mandala – Sacred Circle in Tibetan Buddhism, Shambhala, Boston, ISBN 1-57062-296-5
- 1994: Irgendwo in Bhutan – Wo Frauen (fast immer) das Sagen haben, Verlag im Waldgut, Frauenfeld, ISBN 3 7294 0202 1
- 1992: Das Mandala: Der Heilige Kreis im tantrischen Buddhismus, DuMont, Köln, ISBN 3-7701-2509-6
- 1993: Anthropology of Tibet and the Himalaya (with Charles Ramble), Ethnologische Schriften Zürich, ESZ 12, Ethnological Museum of the University of Zurich, ISBN 3-909105-24-6
- 1984: Nepal – Leben und Überleben, Ethnologische Schriften Zürich, ESZ 2, Völkerkundemuseum der Universität Zürich
- 1983: Peter Aufschnaiter – Sein Leben in Tibet, Steiger Verlag, Innsbruck, ISBN 3-85423-016-8
- 1982: Junge Tibeter in der Schweiz – Studien zum Prozess kultureller Identifikation (with Detlef Kantowsky), Verlag Rüegger, Diessenhofen, ISBN 3 7253 0169 7
- 1982: Fremden-Bilder, Ethnologische Schriften Zürich, ESZ 1, Völkerkundemuseum der Universität Zürich
- 1980: Feste in Ladakh, Akademische Druck- und Verlagsanstalt, Graz, ISBN 3-201-01122-3
- 1978: Tibetan Studies, presented at the International Seminar of Young Tibetologists (with Per Kværne), Völkerkundemuseum der Universität Zürich
- 1974: Heinrich Harrer's Impressionen aus Tibet, Pinguin Verlag, Innsbruck
- 1969: Tibetische Kunst, Tibeta 69, Bern
