= Dobrnja, Tuzla =

Dobrnja
- Village
- Location within Bosnia and Herzegovina
- Coordinates: 44.5806605°N 18.5694182°E
- Country: Bosnia and Herzegovina
- Entity: Federation of Bosnia and Herzegovina
- Canton: Tuzla
- Municipality: Tuzla

Area
  - Total: 1.85 sq mi (4.80 km^{2})

Population (2013)
  - Total: 1,966
  - Density: 1,060/sq mi (410/km^{2})
- Time zone: UTC+1 (CET)
  - Summer (DST): UTC+2 (CEST)

Dobrnja is a village in the municipality of Tuzla, Tuzla Canton, Bosnia and Herzegovina.

== Demographics ==
According to the 2013 census, its population was 1,966.

Ethnicity in 2013
Ethnicity	Number	Percentage
Bosniaks	1,777	90.4%
Croats	11	0.6%
Serbs	5	0.3%
other/undeclared	173	8.8%
Total	1,966	100%
