= Dobjoi Township =

Village in Tibet, China

Coordinates: 28°50′N 90°40′E

Dobjoi or Doqoi is a village and township in the Tibet Autonomous Region, in China.
