= Per Kværne =

Norwegian tibetologist

Per Kværne (born 1 April 1945) is a Norwegian tibetologist and historian of religion.

== Biography ==
Per Kværne was born in Oslo, Norway. In 1970 he received the mag.art. degree in Sanskrit at the University of Oslo. From 1970 to 1975 he worked as a lecturer in the history of religion at the University of Bergen. In 1973 he received the dr.philos. degree from the University of Oslo with his thesis An Anthology of Buddhist Tantric Songs. From 1975 to 2007 he was professor of the history of religion at the University of Oslo, and he is now a professor emeritus.

In 1976 he became an elected member of the Norwegian Academy of Science and Letters. From 1992 he served as chairman of the board of the Institute for Comparative Research in Human Culture, Oslo. He published a series of books on religious history, mainly on Bön and Buddhism.

He also published on art history, including the Singing Songs of the Scottish Heart. William McTaggart 1835-1910.

Kværne became a Catholic on 15 June 1998. From 2006 to 2008 he was a member of the Academic Study Group of the Roman Catholic Diocese of Oslo. From April 2007 to May 2008 he served as dean of Study at the St. Eystein Priest Seminar. Starting in the autumn of 2008 he was a student priest of the Catholic Diocese of Oslo, and in 2010 Kværne was ordained Roman Catholic priest.

== Works ==
- Kværne, Per. 'A Chronological Table of the Bon po: The Bstan rcis of Ni rna bstan ' in 'Acta Orientalia, vol. 33 (1971), pp. 205–282.
- Kværne, Per. 'Aspects of the Origin of the Buddhist Tradition Tibet.' Numen, vol. 19 (1972), no. I, pp. 22–40 TillSappeared later under the title 'The Genesis of the Tibetan Buddhist Tradition' in Tibetan Review, vol. II, no. 3 (March 1976).
- Kværne, Per. 'Bonpo Studies: The A Khrid System of Meditation.' Kailash, vol. 1 (1973), no. 1, pp. 19–50; vol. I, no. 4, PI'. 247-332.
- Kværne, Per. 'Art Bon-po.' Contained in: Dieux et di'/llons ./" J'Himalaya: Art du bouddhisme lamarque, an \Oxhiilil iOIlcatalogue (Paris 1977).
- Kværne, Per. 'Who are the Bonpos?' Tibetan Review (New Delhi), vol. II, no. 9 (September 1976), pp. 30-33. Also contained in: Communications of the Alexander Csoma de Koros Institute for Buddhology (Budapest), vol. 6, nos. 1-2 (1977), pp. 41-47.
- Kværne, Per. 'Continuity and Change in Tibetan Monasticism.' Contained in: Chai-shin Yu, ed., Korean and Asian Religion 7 edition (Toronto 1977), pp. 83-98. (Translation of the article 'Remarques sur I'administration d'un Illonastcre Bon-po,').
- Kværne, Per. An Anthology of Buddhist Tantric Songs: A Study of the Caryāgīti, White Orchid Press (Bangkok: 1977; second printing 1986). A very detailed study of 50 caryāgīti (lit. "songs of the mystic path") poems of 9th-12th century Indian mahasiddhas. Unabridged translation of "Caryāgīti" manuscript in Apabhraṃśa, with a Tibetan commentary by Acarya Munidatta (Tib.: slob-dpon Thub-pas sbyin). Includes transcriptions of original Apabhraṃśa and Tibetan texts.
- Kværne, Per. 'A Preliminary Study of Chapter VI of the (izer-/llig' Contained in: Michael Aris & Aung San Suu Kyi, eds, Tibetan Studies in Honour of Hugh Richardson Mis, 'iI Phillips (Warminister 1979), pp. 185–191.
- Kværne, Per. 'A Bonpo Version of the Wheel of Existence.' Contained in: Michel Strickmann, ed., Tantric and Taoist Studies in Honour of R. A. Stein, Institut Beige des Hautes Etudes, hinoises (Bruxelles 1981), vol. I, pp. 274–289.
- Kværne, Per. 'Dualism in Tibetan Cosmogonic Myths and the Question of Iranian Influence.' Contained in: C. Beckwith, ed., Silver on Lapis: Tibetan Literary Culture and History, The Tibet Society (Bloomington, Indiana 1987), pp. 163–174.
- Kværne, Per. 'A New Chronological Table of the Bon Religion: The Bstan rcis of Hor-bcun bsTan-'jin-blo-gros (1888-1975).' ('oillaill\,d Ill: II. I leilaI'll 8< .J. I.. 1'11llf',1 11 Ill'.. \'lis., Tihcl:/1I Studic.~: I'rocl'edill).:sor Ille 111/ SC/1Iinar or, 11" IntcmaliOlwl Association lor Til>cI:/1I Studies Seltloss I/o henkammer-•Munich 1985, Kommission !"iir Zentralasiatische Studien Bayerischc Akadcmic tier Wissenschaften (Munich 1988), pp. 241–244.
- Kværne, Per. 'Croyances populaires et folklores au Tibet.' Contained in: Myths et croyances du monde entier, Ed. Lidis (Paris 1985), vol. 4, pp. 157–169.
- Kværne, Per. Tibet Bon Religion: A Death Ritual of the Tibetan Bonpos, E. J. Brill (Leiden 1985). Has illustration of tsa-kaIi (ritual 'flash-cards'). (Reviews include one by Per Sorensen in Tibet Journal, vol. 13, no. 2 (1988), pp, 45-46; one by Dan Martin in The Journal of the Tibet Society, vol. 5 (1985), pp. 103–104; and another by Leonard van der Kuijp in Acta Orientalia, vol. 47 (1986), pp. 202–208.)
- Kværne, Per. 'Bon.' Contained in: Mircea Eliade, ed., The Encyclopedia of Religion, Macmillan (New York 1987), vol. 2, pp. 277–281.
- Kværne, Per. 'Le rituel tibetain, illustre par I'evocation, dans la religion Bon-po, du Lion de la Parole.' Contained in: A.M. Blondeau & Kristofer Schipper, eds., Essais sur Ie rituel, I (Colloque du centenaire de la section des sciences religieuses de I'Ecole Pratique des Hautes Etudes), Peeters (Louvain-Paris 1988), pp. 147–158.
- Kværne, Per. 'A Bonpo Bstan-rtsis from 1804.' in: T. Skorupski, ed., Indo-Tibetan Studies: Papers in Honour and Appreciation of Professor David L. Snellgrove's Contribution to Indo-Tibetan Studies, The Institute of Buddhist Studies (Tring 1990), pp. 151–169.
- Kværne, Per. 'A Preliminary Study of the Bonpo Deity Khro-ho Gtso-mchog Mkha'-'gying.' Contained in: Lawrence Epstein & R. F. Sherburne, eds., Reflections on Tibetan Culture: Essays in Memory of Turrell V. Wylie, Edwin Mellen Press (Lewiston 1990), pp. 117–125.
- Kværne, Per. 'L'iconographie religieuse bonpo et ses sources ecrites.' Annuaire de /'Ecole Pratique des Hautes Etudes, vol. 99 (1990-1991), pp. 75–77.
- Kværne, Per. 'Gshen-rab Mi-bo-che [Ston-pa Gshen-rab, 'The Teacher, Supreme Priest'].' Contained in: John R. Hinnells, ed., Who's Who of World Religions, Macmillan (London 1991), p. 136.
- Kværne, Per. 'Anthropogonic Myths of Tibet.' Contained in: Bonnefoy, ed., Mythologies (Chicago 1991), vol. 2, Pl'. 1082-1086. Also in Yves Bonnefoy, ed., A"i:/1I Mytltologies (Chicago 1993), pp. 308–312.
- Kværne, Per. 'Divine Sovereignty in Tibet.' Contained in: Yves Bonnefoy, ed., Mythologies (Chicago 1991), vol. 2, pp. 1086–1088. Also in Yves Bonnefoy, ed., Asian Mythologies (Chicago 1993), pp. 312–314.
- Kværne, Per. 'Introduction to Tibetan Mythology.' Contained in: Yves Bonnefoy, ed., Mythologies (Chicago 1991), vol. 2, pp. 1075–1077.
- Kværne, Per. 'Cosmogonic Myths of Tibet.' Contained in: Yves Bonnefoy, ed., Mythologies (Chicago 1991), vol. 2, pp. 1079–1082.
- Kværne, Per. 'Chronological Tables (bstan-rcis) of the Bon Religion.' (contained in: A. Wezler, et a1., eds., Proceedings of the XXII International Congress for Asian and North African Studies [ZDMG Supplement 9], Franz Steiner (Stuttgart 1992), pp. 212–213.
- Kværne, Per. 'Bon.' Contained in: Paul Poupard, et al., eds., Dictionnaire des religions, Presses Universitaires de France (Paris 1993), vol. I, pp. 231–3.
- Kværne, Per. 'Tibet, la mythologie, introduction au probleme.' Dictionnaire des mythologies (Flammarion). An English translation is also available in Yves Bonnefoy, Asian Mythologies, University of Chicago Press (Chicago 1993), pp. 301–303, including a detailed bibliography.
- Kværne, Per. 'Introduction.' Contained in: Shardza Tashi Gyaltsen, Heart Drops of Dharmakaya: Dzogchen Practice of the Bon Tradition, Snow Lion (Ithaca 1993), pp. 13–15.
- Kværne, Per. 'Bibliographic Essay.' Contained m: Shardza Tashi Gyaltsen, Heart Drops of Dharmakaya: Dzogchen Practice of the Bon Tradition, Snow Lion (Ithaca 1993), pp. 161–163.
- Kværne, Per. 'II,)n Rescues Dharma.' Contained in: Donald Lopez Jr., ed., Religions of Tibet in Practice, Princeton University Press (Princeton 1997), pp. 98–102.
- Kværne, Per. 'Cards for the Dead.' Contained in: Donald Lopez Jr., ed., Religions of Tibet in Practice, Princeton University Press (Princeton 1997), pp. 494–498.
- Kværne, Per. 'Invocations to Two Bon Deities.' Contained in: Donald Lopez Jr., ed., Religions of Tibet in Practice, Princeton University Press (Princeton 1997), pp. 395–400.
- Kværne, Per. 'Khyung-sprul 'Jigs-med nam-mkha'i rdo-rje (\ 8971955): An Early Twentieth-Century Tibetan Pilgrim in India.' Contained in: Alex McKay, ed., Pilgrimage in Tibet, Curzon (Surrey 1998), pp. 71–84.
- Kværne, Per. 'I.e lIi;n, I'autre religion.' Contained in: Katia ButTetrilie & (Charles H:llnhk, cds., Tihi'lnills 1')5'.1•1'.1')'): 40 nIlS decolonisa/io/l, (':diliolls Autrement (Paris 1998), pp. 58–73.
- Kværne, Per. '1 lie Mythologic der Bon-Religion und der tibetischen Volksreligion.' Contained in: Egidius Schmalzriedt & Ilans Wilhelm Haussig, eds., Worterbuch der Mythologie, Klett-Colta (2000'1), pp. 830–875.
- Kværne, Per. 'Meditation de la Grande Perfection.' Contained in: Paul Poupard, et aI., eds., Dictionnaire des religions, Presses Universitaires de France (Paris 1993), vol. 2, pp. 12871288.
- Kværne, Per. 'Mongols and Khitans in a 14th-Century Tibetan Bonpo Text.' Acta Orientalia Hungaricae, vol. 34 (1980), pp. 85–104.
- Kværne, Per. 'Peintures tibetaines de la vie de Ston-pa-ggen-rab.' ArtsAsiatiques, vol. 41 (1986), pp. 36–81.
- Kværne, Per and Elliot Sperling. 'Preliminary Study of an Inscription from Rgyal-rong.' Acta Orientalia, vol. 54 (1993), pp. 113–125.
- Kværne, Per. 'Rcligious Change and Syncretism: The Case of the Bon Religion of Tibet.' Contained in: Per Kvrernc & Rinzin Thargyal, Bon, Buddhism and Democracy: The Building of a Tibetan National Identity, NIAS Report no. 12 (Copenhagen 1993), pp. 7–26.
- Kværne, Per. 'Remarques sur l'administration d'un monastere Bon-po.' Journal Asiatique, vol. 258 (1970), pp. 187–192.
- Kværne, Per. 'Sakyamuni in the Bon Religion.' Temenos, vol. 25' (1989), pp. 33–40.
- Kværne, Per. 'Set of Thangkas Illustrating the Life of Slon-pa Gshen-rab in the Musée Guimet, Paris.' Tibet Journal, vol. 12, no. 3 (1987), pp. 62–67. English translalion of the introduction of his 1986 article.
- Kværne, Per. 'Shar-rdza Bkra-shis rgyal-mtshan (1859-1 'n ~). ' Contained in: John R. Hinnells, ed., Who's Who of World Religions, Macmillan (London 1991), PI'. 371-372.
- Kværne, Per. 'Shes-rab rgyal-mtshan (1356-1415).' Containcd in: John R. Hinnells, ed., Who's Who of World Religions, Macmillan (London 1991), pp. 373–4. On the foundcr of Sman-ri Monastery in Gtsang province of Tibet.
- Kværne, Per. 'The Bon of Tibet: The Historical Enigma of a Monaslic Tradition.' Contained in: Christopher von F(jrerHaimendorf, The !?cllaissallcc of Tibctall Civilizatioll, Synergeli<.: Press (Orade, Arizona 1990), pp. 114–119.
- Kværne, Per. 'Tilt: HOIl 1 A Survey of Research.' Nl;\S Report I 'Nil, Nordit: Institute of Asian Studies (1990), pp. 143–153. Also published in T. Skorupski & U. Pagel, cds., The Uuddhist Forum, Volume III, School of Oriental & African Studies (London 1994), pp. 13 114I.
- Kværne, Per. The Bon Religion of Tibet: The Iconography of a Living Tradition, Serindia Publications (London 1995). (Reviewed by Deborah Klimburg-Salter in Orientations, vol. 29, no. 9 (October 1998), p. 110, and Anne Chayet in Revue Bibliographique de Sinologie (1996), pp. 174–175 and in Arts Asiatiques, vol. 51 (1996), p. 164. Reviewed by Ramon Prats in East and West, vol. 46, nos. 3-4 (1996), pp. 518–520, and in Boletin de la Sociedad Espanola de Ciencias de las Religiones, vol. 6 (1996), pp. 57–59.
- Kværne, Per. 'The Bonpos of Tibet: An Historical Enigma.' Contained in: M. Pye & P. McKenzie, eds., History of Religions: Proceedings of the 13th International Congress of the International Association for the History of Religions (Lancaster 15–22 August 1975), pp. 45–46. Abstract only.
- Kværne, Per. 'The Canon of the Tibetan Bonpos.' Indo-Iranian Journal, vol. 16 (1974), pp. 18–56, 96-144.
- Kværne, Per. 'The Date of Sakyamuni According to Bonpo Sources.' Contained in: Heinz Bcchert, ed., The Dating of the /listoric, 1 1111/1""". 1'"rl I, Vandenhoeck & Ruprecht (Giiltingcn I'l') I), pp. 415–420.
- Kværne, Per. 'The Great Perfection in the Tradition of the Bonpos.• Contained in: Whalen Lai & Lewis Lancaster, eds., Early Ch 'an in China and Tibet, Berkeley Buddhist Studies Series (Berkeley 1983), pp. 367–392.
- Kværne, Per. 'The Importance of Origins III Tibetan Mythology.' Contained in: Yves Bonnefoy, ed., Mythologies (Chicago 1993), vol. 2, pp. 1077–1079.
- Kværne, Per. 'The Literature of Bon.' Contained in: Jose Cabezon & Roger Jackson, eds., Tibetan Literature: Studies in Genre, Snow Lion (Ithaca 1996), pp. 139–146.
- Kværne, Per. 'The Monastery of Snang-zhig of the Bon Religion in the Rnga-ba district of Amdo.' Contained in: P. Daffim'i, ed., Indo-Sino-Tibetica: Studi in onore di Luciano Petech, Bardi Editore (Rome 1990), pp. 207–222.
- Kværne, Per. The Stages of A-khrid Meditation: Dzogchen Practice of the Bon Tradition (by Bru-sgom Rgyal-ba-g.yung-drung), Library of Tibetan Works and Archives (Dharamsala 1996). Co-authored with Thupten K. Rikey.
- Kværne, Per. 'The Study of Bon in the West: Past, Present and Future.' Contained in: S.G. Karmay & Y. Nagano, eds., New Horizons in Bon Studies (Senri Ethnological Reports no. 15), National Museum of Ethnology (Osaka 2000), pp. 7–20.
- Kværne, Per. 'The Succession of Lamas at the Monastery of sNangzhig in the rNga-ba District of Amdo.' Contained in: S. Karmay & P. Sagant, eds., Les Habitants du toit du monde, Societe d'ethnologie (Nanterre 1997), pp. 155–157.
- Kværne, Per. 'The Water-Miracle in Tibet.' Contained in: Eivind Kahrs, ed., Kalyāṇamitrārāgaṇam: Essays in Honour of Nils Simonsson, Norwegian University Press, Institute for Comparative Research in Human Culture (Oslo 1986), pp. 159–164.
