= 56th Golden Horse Awards =

2019 Taiwanese film awards ceremony

- Poster
- Date: November 23, 2019
- Site: Sun Yat-sen Memorial Hall, Taipei, Taiwan
- Preshow hosts: Pink Yang, Liu Kuan-ting
- Organized by: Taipei Golden Horse Film Festival Executive Committee

Highlights
- Best Feature Film: A Sun
- Best Director: Chung Mong-hong; A Sun
- Best Actor: Chen Yi-wen; A Sun
- Best Actress: Yeo Yann Yann; Wet Season
- Most awards: A Sun (6)
- Most nominations: Detention (12)

Television in Taiwan
- Network: TTV

The 56th Golden Horse Awards (Chinese: 第56屆金馬獎) took place on November 23, 2019 at the Sun Yat-sen Memorial Hall in Taipei, Taiwan. Organized by the Taipei Golden Horse Film Festival Executive Committee, the awards honored the best in Chinese-language films of 2018 and 2019. The ceremony was televised by TTV.

== Winners and nominees ==
Best Feature Film: A Sun; Suk Suk; The Garden of Evening Mists; Wet Season; Detention	Best Documentary: Your Face; The Tree Remembers; The Good Daughter; Bamboo Theatre; Last Year When the Train Passed By
Best Animation Feature -	Best Live Action Short Film: 3 Generations 3 Days; Old Man and A Dog; Liu A, Sing A, and Bi Hong; Rebel Boy; Langit Budak Biru
Best Animated Short Film: Gold Fish; Hidden Zone; My Father at Grandma's Funeral; Adorable; The Lighthouse	Best Director: Chung Mong-hong — A Sun; Tom Lin Shu-yu — The Garden of Evening Mists; Anthony Chen — Wet Season; Chang Tso-chi — Synapses; Midi Z — Nina Wu
Best Leading Actor: Chen Yi-wen — A Sun; Wu Chien-ho — A Sun; Tai Bo — Suk Suk; Ben Yuen — Suk Suk; Chu Pak Hong — My Prince Edward	Best Leading Actress: Yeo Yann Yann — Wet Season; Samantha Ko — A Sun; Angelica Lee — The Garden of Evening Mists; Lü Hsueh-feng — Synapses; Gingle Wang — Detention
Best Supporting Actor: Liu Kuan-ting — A Sun; Duan Chun-hao — We Are Champions; Koh Jia Ler — Wet Season; Yang Shi Bin — Wet Season; Li Ying-chuan — Synapses	Best Supporting Actress: Winnie Chang — The Teacher; Eleven Yao — The Gangs, The Oscars, and The Walking Dead; Wen Chen-ling — A Sun; Patra Au — Suk Suk; Lu Yi-ching — 3 Days 2 Nights
Best New Director: John Hsu — Detention; Lau Kek-huat and Vera Chen — Boluomi; Hung Tzu-hsuan — The Scoundrels; Hsu Chia-kai — The Last Thieves; Wong Yee-lam — My Prince Edward	Best New Performer: Fandy Fan — We Are Champions; Yuan Teng — The Paradise; Tsai Jia-yin — Heavy Craving; Oscar Chiu — The Teacher; Tseng Ching-hua — Detention
Best Original Screenplay: Yeo Siew Hua — A Land Imagined; Chung Mong-hong and Chang Yao-sheng — A Sun; Ray Yeung — Suk Suk; Anthony Chen — Wet Season; Wu Ke-xi and Midi Z — Nina Wu	Best Adapted Screenplay: John Hsu, Fu Kai-ling, Chien Shih-keng — Detention; Lai Meng-jie, Neverland Entertainment Limited, Liu Hsueh-jung — Stand by Me; Richard Smith — The Garden of Evening Mists
Best Cinematography: Chen Ko-chin and Chen Chih-hsuan — The Scoundrels; Nagao Nakashima — A Sun; Chen Tapu — We Are Champions; Kartik Vijay — The Garden of Evening Mists; Florian Zinke — Nina Wu	Best Visual Effects: Renovatio Pictures and Tomi Kuo — Detention; Charles Lee and Yeh Jen-hao — The Devil Fish; Wells Tu — We Are Champions; Simple View Production Company — Synapses; Grass Jelly Studio, MoonShine VFX and The White Rabbit Entertainment, Inc. — Mayday Life
Best Art Direction: Wang Chih-cheng — Detention; Hsiao Jen-chieh — Paradise Next; Lai Yung-kun — The Magnificent Bobita; Penny Tsai, Lum Heng-soon and Chen Hsuan-shao — The Garden of Evening Mists; Kuo Chih-da — Nina Wu	Best Makeup & Costume Design: Nikki Gooley, Biby Chow, Penny Tsai and Nina Edwards — The Garden of Evening Mists; Kao Chia-lin — The Magnificent Bobita; Lore Shih — The Gangs, The Oscars, and The Walking Dead; Hsu Li-wen and Lo Wan-yi — The Scoundrels; Jelly Chung and Chan Cheuk-ming — Nina Wu
Best Action Choreography: Hung Shih-hao — The Scoundrels; Hung Shih-hao and Chia Fan — We Are Champions; Jimmy Hung — Detention; Gino Yang — Mayday Life	Best Original Film Score: Teo Wei Yong — A Land Imagined; Ryuichi Sakamoto — Your Face; Onn San — The Garden of Evening Mists; Luming Lu — Detention; Lim Giong — Nina Wu
Best Original Film Song: "The Day After Rain" — Detention; Composer： Luming Lu and Summer Lei; Lyrics： Summer Lei; Performer： Summer Lei; "A Kind of Sorrow" — More than Blue; Composer： Alex Chang-Chien; Lyrics： Gavin Lin; Performer： A-Lin; "Distant Journey" — A Sun; Composer： Lin Sheng Xiang; Lyrics： Chung Mong-hong; Performer： Lin Sheng-xiang; "Nina Wu" — Nina Wu; Composer： Sandee Chan; Lyrics： Sandee Chan; Performer： Sandee Chan; "My Prince Edward" — My Prince Edward; Composer： Eman Lam; Lyrics： Wong Yee-lam; Performer： Stephy Tang	Best Film Editing: Lai Hsiu-hsiung — A Sun; Wenders Li, Kao Ming-sheng, Li Bin and Barfuss Hui — The Scoundrels; Daniel Hui — A Land Imagined; Soo Mun-thye — The Garden of Evening Mists; Shieh Meng-ju — Detention
Best Sound Effects: Li Danfeng, Chou Cheng and Morgan Yen — Nina Wu; Narubett Peamyai and Sidney Hu — The Scoundrels; R.T Kao, Aki Chen — We Are Champions; Damien Guillaume and Gilles Benardeau — A Land Imagined; Dennis Tsao and Book Chien — Detention	Audience Choice Award: A Sun
FIPRESCI Prize: Heavy Craving	Outstanding Taiwanese Filmmaker of the Year: Tang Shiang-chu
Lifetime Achievement Award: Wang Toon; Jimmy Wang

== In the news ==
Following a boycott by China's national film governing board National Radio and Television Administration due to political tensions between Taiwan and China, films from Mainland China were completely absent from the list of nominees. Hong Kong director Johnnie To, who was announced as the jury president for the 56th Golden Horse Awards in June 2019, resigned his position in late September after Hong Kong film studios were reportedly pressured to withdraw from the awards ceremony; To cited his reason as having "previously signed film production contractual obligations". Following the announcement of the Chinese boycott, some production companies in Hong Kong also pulled films from consideration at the award ceremony. Despite this, there were a number of Hong Kong titles in the awards running which include Suk Suk, My Prince Edward and documentary Bamboo Theatre. The jury also includes three Hongkongers, namely filmmaker Wong Chun, animator Lo Che-ying, and critic Fung Ka-ming. Maserati announced on Sina Weibo in October 2019 that it had ended sponsorship of the Golden Horse Awards, stating in part, "Maserati always respects China's territorial integrity, history and culture, and firmly upholds the one-China principle."
