= We Are All Strangers =

- International promotional poster
- Mandarin: 我们不是陌生人
- Directed by: Anthony Chen
- Written by: Anthony Chen
- Produced by: Anthony Chen
- Starring: Yeo Yann Yann; Koh Jia Ler; Andi Lim; Regene Lim
- Cinematography: Teoh Gay Hian
- Edited by: Hoping Chen
- Music by: Kin Leonn; Thomas Foguenne
- Production companies: Giraffe Pictures; MPA APSA Academy Film Fund; Singapore Film Commission
- Release date: 16 February 2026 (Berlinale)
- Running time: 157 minutes
- Country: Singapore
- Languages: Hokkien; Mandarin; English

We Are All Strangers (Chinese: 我们不是陌生人; lit. 'We are not strangers') is a 2026 Singaporean drama film produced, written and directed by Anthony Chen. It is the final film in Chen's "Growing Up" trilogy, following 2013's Ilo Ilo and 2019's Wet Season. It stars Yeo Yann Yann, Koh Jia Ler, Andi Lim and Regene Lim.

The film had its world premiere at the main competition of the 76th Berlin International Film Festival on 16 February 2026, where it was nominated for the Golden Bear. It was selected as the Singaporean entry for Best International Feature Film at the 99th Academy Awards.

== Cast ==
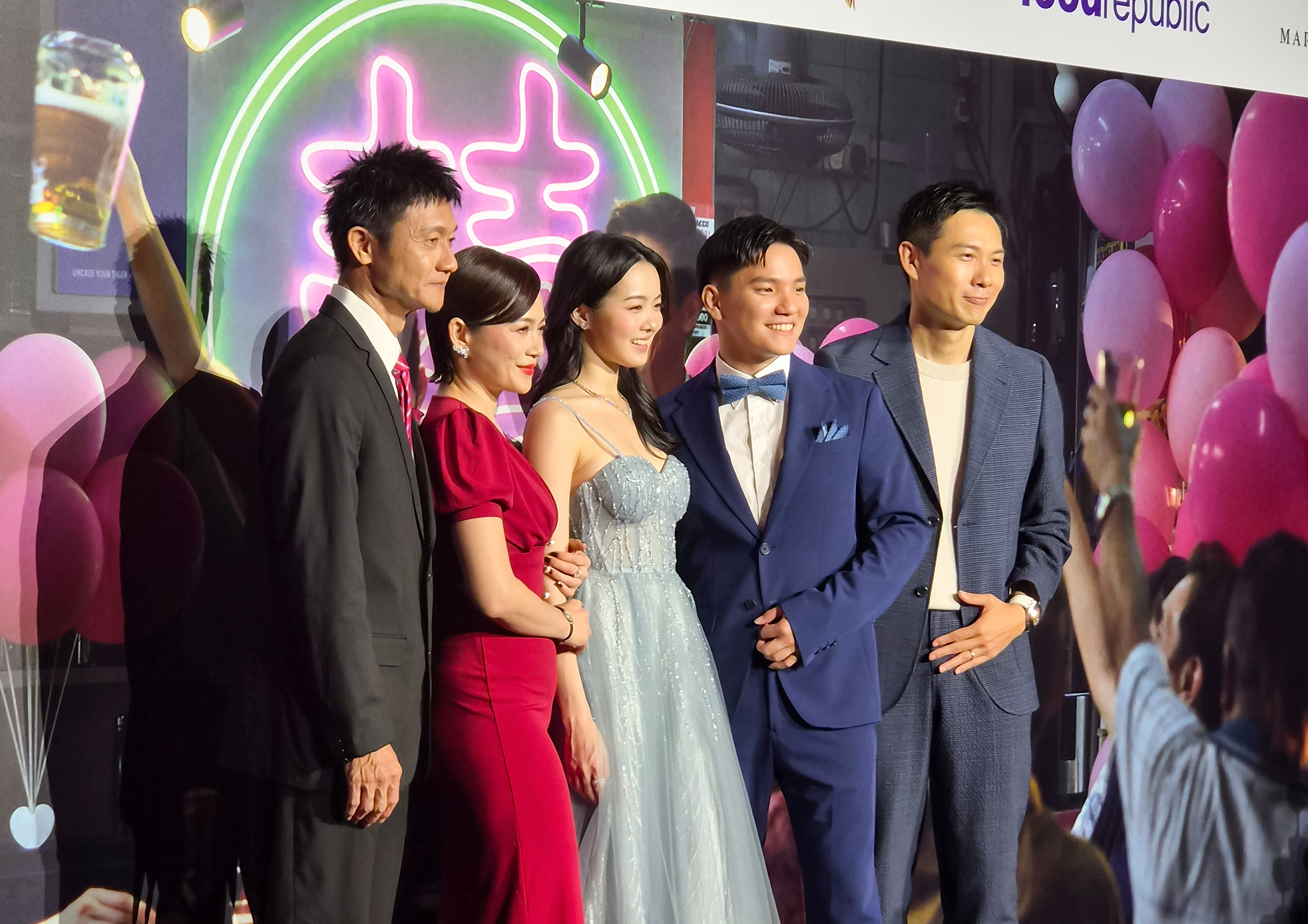
The cast and director of We Are All Strangers at the Singapore Gala Premiere in August 2026.

- Yeo Yann Yann as Bee Hwa
- Koh Jia Ler as Junyang
- Andi Lim as Boon Kiat
- Regene Lim as Lydia

== Release ==
The film is the first Singaporean film to compete for Berlinale's Golden Bear. The film had its Asian premiere as the opening film of the 50th Hong Kong International Film Festival on 1 April 2026. For its Spanish premiere, it was selected in the 'Official Section' of the 71st Valladolid International Film Festival.

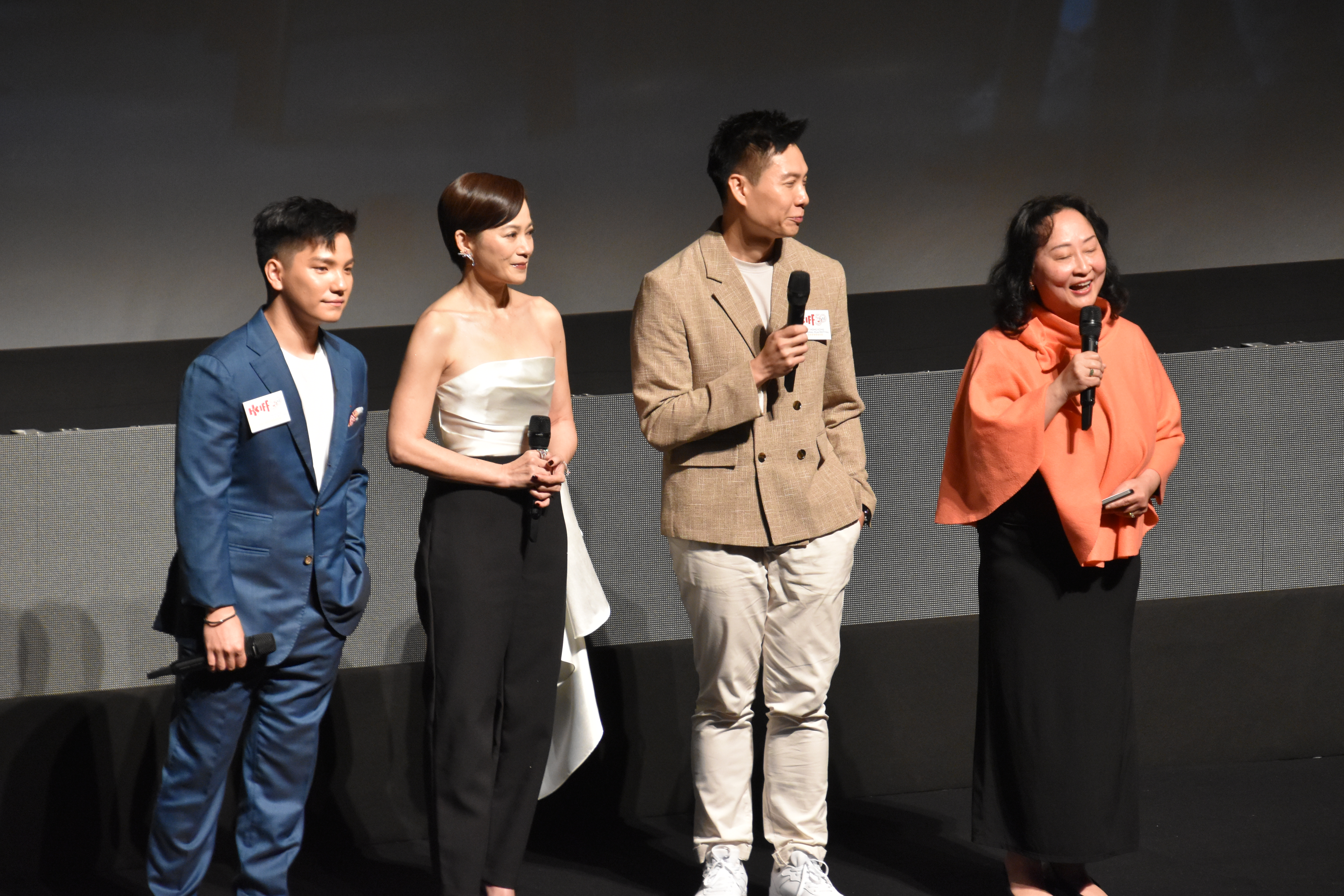
Koh Jia Ler, Yeo Yann Yann, and Anthony Chen after a screening of the film at the 50th Hong Kong International Film Festival.

It was selected as the Singaporean entry for Best International Feature Film at the 99th Academy Awards. Marking Chen's fourth feature film submitted.

== Reception ==
On review aggregator website Rotten Tomatoes, the film holds an approval rating of 83% based on 12 reviews, with an average rating of 7.0/10.

== See also ==
- List of submissions to the 99th Academy Awards for Best International Feature Film
- List of Singaporean submissions for the Academy Award for Best International Feature Film
