= Bamboo Theatre =

2019 Hong Kong documentary by Cheuk Cheung

- Chinese: 戲棚
- Directed by: Cheuk Cheung
- Produced by: Louis Yu; Cheuk Cheung; Naomi Chung
- Cinematography: Szeto Yat-lui; Mak Chi-kwan; Cheung Pak-ming
- Production company: A Priori Image
- Distributed by: Golden Scene
- Release dates: 22 September 2019 (DMZ International Documentary Film Festival); 20 December 2019 (Hong Kong)
- Running time: 76 minutes
- Country: Hong Kong
- Language: Cantonese

Bamboo Theatre (Chinese: 戲棚) is a 2019 Hong Kong documentary film directed by Cheuk Cheung. Commissioned by the Xiqu Centre of the West Kowloon Cultural District, the film made its world premiere at the DMZ International Documentary Film Festival in South Korea in 2019. It was nominated for Best Documentary at the 56th Golden Horse Awards and for Best New Director at the 39th Hong Kong Film Awards. It also received the Special Jury Prize at the 2019 Hong Kong Film Directors' Guild Awards and was selected as a Recommended Film of the Year by the 26th Hong Kong Film Critics Society Awards.

== Synopsis ==
The film focuses on the traditional bamboo theatres of Hong Kong—temporary performance venues built with bamboo scaffolding. It delves into how these structures bring together craftsmanship, folk customs, and Cantonese ritual opera, (Note: Cantonese 神功戲) forming a unique intangible cultural heritage rooted in local tradition.

The documentary captures the entire process of traditional ritual opera, from building the bamboo theatre, performing, behind-the-scene repairs for costumes and set, to taking it down. A number of "ritualistic opening piece", (Note: Cantonese 例戲) an opening piece of traditional ritual opera, are featured in the film: Prime Minister of Six States, (Note: Cantonese 六國大封相) Blessing by the God of Fortune, (Note: Cantonese 加官) Fairy Returning Her Son to the Mortal Father, (Note: Cantonese 賀壽仙姬大送子) etc.

== Production ==
Director Cheuk Cheung had previously released two films, My Way (2012) tells the story of two young men from Hong Kong who pursue a career as Cantonese opera actors, and My Next Step (2015) focuses on the marginal role of martial artists in Kunqu opera. Continuing his exploration of traditional opera culture seen in his earlier documentaries, Cheuk Cheung uses Bamboo Theatre to further investigate the Cantonese ritual opera and the bamboo theatres, meanwhile presenting the spiritual value and humanistic depth of this art form. He believes that bamboo theatres are not merely performance spaces but places of faith and personal grounding. Through this work, Cheuk hopes to break the stereotype of such traditions as "niche" or "dying," and instead reconnect audiences with the cultural and spiritual significance of these heritage practices.

The film took two years to complete, during which Cheuk visited nine bamboo theatres—including the highly challenging clifftop theatre on Po Toi Island. Using a quiet, contemplative visual language and long-take observational style, he avoids interviews and narration, opting instead for pure observation to capture the Cantonese ritual opera and its processes.
