= Fung Ka-ming =

Hong Kong film critic (born 1972)

- 馮家明
- Born: Fung Ka-ming; 1972 (age 53–54); Hong Kong
- Education: Chinese University of Hong Kong (BA)
- Occupation: Film critic
- Years active: 1993–present

Fung Ka-ming (Chinese: 馮家明; born 1972), also known by his pen name Ka Ming (家明), is a Hong Kong film critic. He currently contributes reviews to Ming Pao and is a senior lecturer at the Hong Kong Academy for Performing Arts.

== Early life and education ==
Fung was born in 1972, and grew up at Tung Tau Estate, San Po Kong, where his parents often took him and his younger brother to watch movies at the nearby Palace Theatre. He moved to Tsuen Wan in the 1980s, and attended secondary school at Cheung Shan Estate. During his time in secondary school, he started purchasing City Entertainment Magazine in 1987, enjoying the film reviews and columns, with particular favorites among the reviewers being Li Cheuk-to, Shu Kei, Law Kar, and Wong Ain-ling. He went on to study arts at New Asia College, Chinese University of Hong Kong, and he described himself as frequently skipping classes to "spend more time watching films at the library of United College", where his peers jokingly called him "more like a film major".

In his sophomore year, he submitted a film review of the American film Boxing Helena to Youth's Weekly, which led to a weekly column where he published reviews of two to three thousand words under the pen name "Ka Ming" (Chinese: 家明). He later divided the column into two sections: the first half focused on reviews and the second half covered gossip in the film industry. He graduated in 1995 and began his career as a film educator for Broadway Cinematheque, Fringe Club, and the Hong Kong International Film Festival in 2001.

== Career ==
Fung started writing his film review column for Ming Pao in 2007. In 2010, he served as the editor for a collection of film reviews published by the Hong Kong Film Critics Society titled The Bygone Passion: Hong Kong Cinema in the 1980s, which Leong Kam-sang of Macao Daily News praised for its "authentic revisit of the passion in 1980s [Hong Kong] cinema". He also worked as an independent reviewer for RTHK, overseeing television series for a few years after the introduction of external reviewers in 2011.

In 2019, Fung published his first collection of film reviews, Beyond Sight and Sound: Reflections on Hong Kong and Chinese-language cinema, compiling his reviews after 2007. Dennis Chan of The Reporter found Fung's reviews of Hong Kong films as "extracting a pure essence of Hong Kong values", while his reviews of Taiwanese films were described as "strong, resonant, offering a must-listen overseas perspective"; Hong Kong Inmedia commended the collection fully showcased the efforts of the author, publisher, and editor. In the same year, Fung served as a jury member for the 56th Golden Horse Awards, alongside Hong Kong filmmaker Wong Chun and animator Lo Che-ying, after mainland China boycotted the event and issued a ban preventing Chinese creatives from attending. Fung currently serves as a senior lecturer in film history and film theory at the Hong Kong Academy for Performing Arts.

== Personal life ==
Fung is married and has a daughter. The family resides in Wan Chai. He voiced his support for the 2019–2020 Hong Kong protests, adding several lines in his Ming Pao column after the 12 June protest to demand that Carrie Lam retract the extradition bill and step down.

== Bibliography ==
Year	Title	Original title	Publisher	Ref.
2010	The Bygone Passion: Hong Kong Cinema in the 1980s	溜走的激情──八十年代是句號抑或問號？	Hong Kong Film Critics Society	
2019	Beyond Sight and Sound: Reflections on Hong Kong and Chinese-language cinema	視聽之餘──香港及華語電影雜感	Breakthrough	
