= The Breaking Ice =

2023 Chinese film

- Theatrical release poster
- Chinese: 燃冬
- Literal meaning: "The burning winter"
- Hanyu Pinyin: Rán dōng
- Directed by: Anthony Chen
- Written by: Anthony Chen
- Produced by: Meng Xie; Anthony Chen
- Starring: Zhou Dongyu; Liu Haoran; Qu Chuxiao
- Cinematography: Yu Jing-pin
- Edited by: Hoping Chen; Soo Mun Thye
- Music by: Kin Leonn
- Production companies: Canopy Pictures; Huace Pictures
- Release dates: 21 May 2023 (Cannes); 22 August 2023 (China); 7 September 2023 (Singapore)
- Running time: 97 minutes
- Countries: China; Singapore
- Languages: Mandarin; Korean
- Box office: US$3.5 million

The Breaking Ice (Chinese: 燃冬; pinyin: rán dōng; lit. 'the burning winter') is a 2023 romantic drama film written and directed by Anthony Chen. Starring Zhou Dongyu, Liu Haoran and Qu Chuxiao, the film was selected for the Un Certain Regard section of the 2023 Cannes Film Festival. It was selected as the Singaporean entry for the Best International Feature Film at the 96th Academy Awards.

== Plot ==
Haofeng, a quiet young man from Shanghai, has come to Yanji, a cold border city in northern China near North Korea, for the wedding of a friend. At the wedding, his old friends joke about his expensive watch, but he makes no big deal about its price. When he receives phone calls from a hospital about missing his psychiatric appointment, he insists that they have the wrong number. As he ponders at the edge of a balcony, he sees a tour bus arrive.

Haofeng joins a local tour group, where he meets tour guide Nana, who is not satisfied with her job. Nana's friend Xiao, a local cook, asks her out to dinner. Nana asks if he is going to confess his love for her, which he awkwardly denies. Haofeng loses his cell phone and Nana decides to help him out. She invites him to dinner with Xiao. Xiao and Nana are fascinated by Haofeng's wealthy life working in finance in Shanghai, especially with both of their jobs impacted by the pandemic. After some drinks, Nana and Xiao convince Haofeng to dance.

Haofeng misses his flight home the next day, so the three decide to go together for a ride in the countryside. Nana returns home drunk with Haofeng and they have sex. Haofeng discovers a scar on Nana's ankle, making Nana uncomfortable. In the morning, Xiao's younger cousin teases Xiao about his relationship with Nana. Xiao dismisses the conversation before telling him to study hard in school and not grow up to be like him. Xiao arrives at Nana's home and awkwardly meets Haofeng, then offers to show him around again. The three visit a bookstore, where Haofeng gets intrigued by depictions of the Changbai Mountains and Heaven Lake, while Nana lingers on a book about figure skating. Later at a nightclub, Haofeng tells Xiao and Nana to go dance as he stays in his seat and cries alone. Xiao tries to kiss Nana while dancing but fails. At the end of the night, they drunkenly plan a trip to see Heaven Lake.

Nana's long-lost friend visits unexpectedly. It is revealed that Nana used to be a talented figure skater. The friend confronts Nana for losing contact with everyone, including their coach who died, as well as her mother. Meanwhile, Xiao gives Haofeng a ride back to the hotel. Haofeng requests Xiao to accompany him because he does not wish to be alone, and then falls asleep quickly.

On the way to the Changbai Mountains, Haofeng tells a local legend about a bear who became human. While drunk during dinner, Xiao mentions a wanted criminal who is worth more money than he has ever seen. Outside the restaurant, he notices a suspicious man walking by but does nothing. During the day, they embark on their long, snowy hike to see Heaven Lake. However, near the end of the journey, the ranger notifies them that it's too foggy up in the mountains to see anything and that they should return immediately for their safety. Haofeng stands at the edge of a cliff and looks down, almost taking a step forward, but runs back to the group when a bear appears. Approached by Nana, the bear sniffs at her and then leaves. The three return and get drunk again.

At Nana's home, Xiao wakes up to the sight of Haofeng and Nana asleep together in bed. As Xiao prepares to leave, Nana hugs him. Haofeng leaves his watch behind and returns to Shanghai. Xiao bids farewell to his cousin, then attempts to crash into an oncoming truck, but steers away last minute and smiles. Nana calls her family, telling them that she will come home for Chinese New Year, and then takes out her old skates.

== Cast ==
- Zhou Dongyu as Nana
- Liu Haoran as Haofeng
- Qu Chuxiao as Han Xiao
- Wei Ruguang as the fugitive
- Liu Baisha as tour member

== Production ==
In June 2021, Chen was challenged by a Chinese writer during his stint as the jury of the Shanghai International Film Festival. The writer felt that his films were uncommonly “mature and precise” and asked Chen, “What do you think your films would be like if you let go of control and worked with a freer spirit?”. Due to a delay in scheduling of his ongoing film, Drift, Chen decided to film about Chinese youths in China.

The film was written in a matter of days during director Anthony Chen's quarantine in a hotel in China during the pandemic period. It was filmed around the Changbai Mountains for 38 days with wintry scenes shot in temperatures that reached -18 degrees Celsius.

== Reception ==
=== Box office ===
The film grossed $46,122.22 in Singapore and US$3.5 million worldwide.

=== Critical response ===
On the review aggregator website Rotten Tomatoes, 94% of 34 critics' reviews are positive, with an average rating of 7.2/10. The website's consensus reads: "A beautifully filmed portrait of twentysomething ennui, The Breaking Ice explores interpersonal connections with a subtle, delicate touch." Metacritic, which uses a weighted average, assigned the film a score of 71 out of 100, based on 11 critics, indicating "generally favorable" reviews.

The film was selected by The Hollywood Reporter as one of the best films of Cannes Film Festival.

== See also ==
- List of submissions to the 96th Academy Awards for Best International Feature Film
- List of Singaporean submissions for the Academy Award for Best International Feature Film
