= List of Singaporean submissions for the Academy Award for Best International Feature Film =

Best International Feature Film submissions from Singapore

Highlights
- Debut: 1959
- Submissions: 20
- Nominations: none
- Oscar winners: none

Singapore has submitted films for the Academy Award for Best International Feature Film (Note: The category was previously named the Academy Award for Best Foreign Language Film, but this was changed to the Academy Award for Best International Feature Film in April 2019, after the Academy deemed the word "Foreign" to be outdated.) since 2005, although they submitted a film while still being a British colony in 1959. The award, first established at the 28th Academy Awards ceremony, is handed out annually by the Academy of Motion Picture Arts and Sciences (AMPAS) to a feature-length motion picture produced outside the United States that contains primarily non-English dialogue. The academy selection committee reviews all the submitted films, and secret ballot voting is used to determine the five nominees.

As of 2026, Singapore has submitted twenty films, but none of them were nominated.

== Submissions ==
The country first submission took place shortly after its independence from the United Kingdom and Malaysia, with The Kingdom and the Beauty (1959) directed by Li Han-hsiang. But the country entered in 46-years hiatus, returning only in 2005. Since then, it has been submitting films regularly for the category.

Filmmakers Eric Khoo and Anthony Chen had each four films submitted. Although Khoo's Be with Me (2005) was disqualified for having more than 50% of its dialogue in English.

Below is a list of the films that have been submitted by Singapore for review by the Academy for the award, by year and the respective Academy Awards ceremony.

Year (Ceremony)	Film title used in nomination	Original title	Language(s)	Director(s)	Result
1959 (32nd)	The Kingdom and the Beauty	江山美人	Mandarin	Li Han-hsiang	Not nominated
2005 (78th)	Be with Me		English, Cantonese, Mandarin and Hokkien	Eric Khoo	Disqualified
2007 (80th)	881		Mandarin, Hokkien and English	Royston Tan	Not nominated
2008 (81st)	My Magic		Tamil	Eric Khoo	Not nominated
2011 (84th)	Tatsumi		Japanese	Eric Khoo	Not nominated
2012 (85th)	Already Famous	一泡而红	Mandarin	Michelle Chong	Not nominated
2013 (86th)	Ilo Ilo	爸妈不在家	Mandarin	Anthony Chen	Not nominated
2014 (87th)	My Beloved Dearest	Sayang Disayang	Malay	Sanif Olek	Not nominated
2015 (88th)	7 Letters		Malay, Hokkien, Mandarin, Malayalam, English	Boo Junfeng, Eric Khoo, Jack Neo, K. Rajagopal, Tan Pin Pin, Royston Tan, Kelvin Tong	Not nominated
2016 (89th)	Apprentice		Malay, English	Boo Junfeng	Not nominated
2017 (90th)	Pop Aye		Thai	Kirsten Tan	Not nominated
2018 (91st)	Buffalo Boys		Indonesian, English	Mike Wiluan	Not nominated
2019 (92nd)	A Land Imagined	幻土	Mandarin, English, Bengali	Yeo Siew Hua	Not nominated
2020 (93rd)	Wet Season	热带雨	Mandarin, English, Hokkien	Anthony Chen	Not nominated
2021 (94th)	Precious Is the Night	今宵多珍重	Mandarin	Wayne Peng	Not nominated
2022 (95th)	Ajoomma	花路阿朱妈	Mandarin, Korean, English	He Shuming	Not nominated
2023 (96th)	The Breaking Ice	燃冬	Mandarin, Korean	Anthony Chen	Not nominated
2024 (97th)	La Luna		Malay	M. Raihan Halim	Not nominated
2025 (98th)	Stranger Eyes	默視錄	Mandarin, English, Singaporean Hokkien	Yeo Siew Hua	Not nominated
2026 (99th)	We Are All Strangers	我们不是陌生人	Mandarin, English, Singaporean Hokkien	Anthony Chen	Pending

== See also ==
- List of Academy Award winners and nominees for Best International Feature Film
- List of Academy Award-winning foreign language films
- Cinema of Singapore
