= Story in Taipei =

2017 Taiwanese film

- promotional poster
- Traditional Chinese: 台北物語
- Simplified Chinese: 台北物语
- Literal meaning: Taipei monogatari
- Hanyu Pinyin: Táiběi wùyǔ
- Directed by: Huang Ying-hsiung
- Release date: May 19, 2017
- Running time: 118 minutes
- Country: Taiwan
- Languages: Chinese; Taiwanese

Story in Taipei (Chinese: 台北物語; pinyin: Táiběi Wùyǔ; also translated as Story of Taipei) is a 2017 Taiwanese film written and directed by Huang Ying-hsiung (黃英雄). It has been described as Taiwan's first cult film, of the "so bad it's good" type.

== Plot ==
The somewhat convoluted plot involves a thief who steals a taxi, which is then boarded by a passenger. They are involved in an accident with a drunk-driving politician, who is having an affair with his assistant. Fearing scandal, he offers to buy the taxi and pay NT$500,000 in exchange for silence. The taxi-driving thief and his passenger try to blackmail the politician for more money. Unknown to them all, there is a person in the taxi's boot. The politician's wife, a doctor, starts investigating her husband's activities. At the end, all characters meet and a lot of issues are revealed, including that some other subplots were just made up stories.

== Cast ==
- Su Yinan (蘇尹男) as lawmaker Ke Xien
- Chen Yi-an (陳怡安) as Sun Ying, his wife
- Mina Lee (李宓) as Guo Xinchun, his assistant
- Oscar Chiu (邱志宇) as Tony, Sun Ying's colleague
- Zhang Zhehao (張哲豪) as Lin Xiaoqing, the thief
- Fu Peiling (傅佩玲) as Lin Qiuhong, the passenger who blackmails Ke Xien
- Fang Shengqiu (方升暘) as Ke's assistant
- Kang Luqi (康祿祺) as a builder

== Reception ==
After opening in just three theaters in 2017, the film quickly became a social media phenomenon because of its flaws. It achieved more than NT$5 million in box office receipts and played for 38 days. It has been described as the lowest quality film in Taiwanese history and compared to The Room.
