= Synapses (film) =

2019 film directed by Chang Tso-chi

- Film poster
- Simplified Chinese: 那个我最亲爱的陌生人
- Directed by: Chang Tso-chi
- Written by: Chang Tso-chi
- Produced by: Wen Horng Kao
- Starring: Lü Hsueh-feng; Oscar Chiu; Li Meng
- Music by: Lin Shang-Te; Tseng Yun-Fang
- Release dates: 7 November 2019 (56th Golden Horse Awards); 15 November 2019 (Taiwan)
- Running time: 116 minutes
- Country: Taiwan
- Language: Mandarin

Synapses (Chinese: 那个我最亲爱的陌生人), also known as The Beloved Stranger, is a 2019 Taiwanese drama film directed and written by Chang Tso-chi, starring Lü Hsueh-feng and Oscar Chiu. The film debuted at the 2019 Golden Horse Film Festival.

== Plot ==
Many problems in the Zhang family, but one eventful summer changes many things. Zhang Junxiong is diagnosed with Alzheimer's, and his condition weighs heavily on his wife Wang Feng (Lü Hsueh-feng) and the rest of the family. His daughter-Xiao Meng is released on parole from a long prison term and struggles to reconnect with her illegitimate son Ah Chuan and her loose-cannon ex-boyfriend Ah Wen.

== Cast ==
- Lü Hsueh-feng as Wang Feng
- Oscar Chiu as Ah Wen
- Li Meng as Xiao Meng
- Li Ying-chuan as Ah Chuan

== Awards and nominations ==
| Year | Award | Category | Recipients | Result |
|---|---|---|---|---|
| 2019 | 56th Golden Horse Awards | Best Director | Chang Tso-chi | Nominated |
| 2019 | 56th Golden Horse Awards | Best Leading Actress | Lü Hsueh-feng | Nominated |
| 2019 | 56th Golden Horse Awards | Best Supporting Actor | Li Ying-chuan | Nominated |
| 2019 | 56th Golden Horse Awards | Best Visual Effects | Simple View Production Company | Nominated |
