= Drift (2023 film) =

Film directed by Anthony Chen

- U.S. theatrical release poster
- Directed by: Anthony Chen
- Written by: Susanne Farrell; Alexander Maksik
- Based on: A Marker to Measure Drift by Alexander Maksik
- Produced by: Peter Spears; Émilie Georges; Naima Abed; Anthony Chen; Cynthia Erivo; Solome Williams
- Starring: Cynthia Erivo; Alia Shawkat; Ibrahima Ba; Honor Swinton Byrne; Zainab Jah; Suzy Bemba; Vincent Vermignon
- Cinematography: Crystel Fournier
- Edited by: Hoping Chen
- Music by: Ré Olunuga
- Production companies: Sunac Culture; Aim Media; Paradise City; Cor Cordium; Hope Street; Heretic; Fortyninesixty Films; Edith's Daughter; ERT SA
- Distributed by: Épicentre Films (France); MetFilm Distribution (United Kingdom)
- Release dates: 22 January 2023 (Sundance); 29 March 2024 (United Kingdom); 24 April 2024 (France)
- Running time: 93 minutes
- Countries: France; Greece; United Kingdom
- Language: English
- Box office: $18,631

Drift is a 2023 drama film directed by Anthony Chen from a screenplay by Susanne Farrell and Alexander Maksik. It is based on the novel A Marker to Measure Drift by Maksik. A French, British and Greek co-production, it is Chen's first English-language feature. The film stars Cynthia Erivo, Alia Shawkat, Ibrahima Ba, Honor Swinton Byrne, Zainab Jah and Suzy Bemba. Drift had its world premiere at the Sundance Film Festival on 22 January 2023. It was featured at the 54th IFFI 2023, where it won the ICFT-UNESCO Gandhi Medal-Special Mention for Best Film on peace and inter-cultural dialogue.

== Plot summary ==
The film follows Jacqueline, a Liberian refugee, who flees to a Greek island and develops a friendship with an American tour guide while coping with her past.

== Cast ==
- Cynthia Erivo as Jacqueline Kamara
- Alia Shawkat as Callie
- Ibrahima Ba as Ousmane
- Honor Swinton Byrne as Helen
- Zainab Jah as Etweda Kamara
- Suzy Bemba as Saifa Kamara
- Vincent Vermignon as Michael Kamara

== Production ==
Drift is a co-production between France's Paradise City Films, Greece's Heretic and the United Kingdom's Fortyninesixty, in association with Cor Cordium, Edith's Daughter and Giraffe Pictures, and is financed by Sunac Culture and Aim Media, Lauran Bromley's Ages LLC, the UK Global Screen Fund, and the Greek Film Center, with additional support from the Creative Europe Media European Program. United Talent Agency handles North American rights on the film.

Principal photography in Greece concluded in May 2022.

== Release ==
Drift had its world premiere at the 2023 Sundance Film Festival in the Premieres section on 22 January 2023. In April 2023, Utopia acquired U.S. distribution rights to the film.

== Reception ==
On the review aggregator website Rotten Tomatoes, 75% of 51 critics' reviews are positive, with an average rating of 6/10. The website's consensus reads: "Thanks to stellar work from Cynthia Erivo and Alia Shawkat, Drift frequently engages despite an often hazy narrative." Metacritic, which uses a weighted average, assigned the film a score of 61 out of 100, based on 10 critics, indicating "generally favorable" reviews.
