= Wet Season (film) =

2019 Singaporean film

- Film poster
- Traditional Chinese: 熱帶雨
- Simplified Chinese: 热带雨
- Literal meaning: Tropical rain
- Hanyu Pinyin: Rèdài Yǔ
- Hokkien POJ: Jia̍t-tài Hō͘
- Directed by: Anthony Chen
- Screenplay by: Anthony Chen
- Produced by: Anthony Chen; Huang Wenhong; Tan Si En
- Starring: Yeo Yann Yann; Koh Jia Ler
- Cinematography: Sam Care
- Edited by: Hoping Chen: Joanne Cheong
- Production companies: Giraffe Pictures: HOOQ; Rediance; Singapore Film Commission
- Distributed by: Golden Village Pictures
- Release dates: 8 September 2019 (TIFF); 28 November 2019 (Singapore)
- Running time: 103 minutes
- Country: Singapore
- Languages: Mandarin; English

Wet Season (Chinese: 热带雨) is a 2019 Singaporean drama film written, produced and directed by Anthony Chen. In the film, a teacher and a student in Singapore secondary school form a special, self-affirming relationship. The film stars Yeo Yann Yann and Koh Jia Ler. It received positive reviews and was released on 28 November 2019 in Singapore.

The film is Chen's second feature film after Ilo Ilo in 2013 for which he won the Caméra d'Or at the Cannes Film Festival. The film reunites actress Yeo Yann Yann and actor Koh Jia Ler after their first collaboration in Ilo Ilo. The film also stars Christopher Lee and Yang Shi Bin.

It received six nominations at the 56th Golden Horse Awards, including Best Film, Best Director and Best Supporting Actors for Koh Jia Ler and Yang Shi Bin. It eventually won the Best Leading Actress for Yeo Yann Yann.

The film was also released on 31 January 2020 in Taiwan, 12 March 2020 in Malaysia, and 4 June 2020 in Hong Kong. It was selected as the Singaporean entry for the Best International Feature Film at the 93rd Academy Awards, but it was not nominated.

== Plot ==
Ling, a Malaysian Chinese teacher in her late 30s, and her husband Andrew are struggling to conceive through In vitro fertilisation. Ling also has to take care of her bedridden father-in-law, who has suffered a stroke and is unable to speak, whilst Andrew is often absent from home. Ling sees a gynaecologist at a clinic to be informed that she has two mature follicles. Outside, she finds Kok Wei Lun, a student who is infatuated with her, on crutches because of his injuries sustained from his wushu training. Ling offers to take Wei Lun home, and learns that his parents are overseas on business and he lives alone.

Ling holds a remedial class for selected students, but the students leave when Ling temporarily goes out to meet her durian-selling brother. Ling returns to class with a bag of durians offered by her brother to find that only Wei Lun has remained, an act ridiculed by his classmates. Ling and Wei Lun share the durians in the classroom, and their relationship deepens. Wei Lun starts to frequently consult Ling for remedial classes, and eventually goes to her house, encountering Ling's father-in-law while carelessly wandering around her house. Wei Lun invites Ling, who brings along her father-in-law, to support him at a national wushu competition. At the competition, Wei Lun wins first place and a gold medal. The trio celebrate by visiting Ling's brother's durian shop, and their ties deepen, forming a family bond of sorts.

Eventually, Ling's father-in-law dies in his sleep. At his wake, Ling's siblings-in-law decide that they should sell their dead father's property, and she discovers that Andrew is cheating on her with another woman with a son, who have come to pay respects to him. Ling, lonely and without support, gives Wei Lun a ride to his home. Ling goes up to Wei Lun's house to take care of his bleeding nose in his bedroom, where he coerces her into having sex. Ling gives into Wei Lun's sexual advances, and Wei Lun begins to initiate more inappropriate physical contact with her. Ling becomes reticent with Wei Lun, who begins stalking her frequently and harasses her on public transport after she crashes her car as a result of his rash actions. The affair is ultimately uncovered by the school principal after Wei Lun was caught in a fight with two schoolmates, who tried to expose covertly taken photos of Ling on his phone. The principal, expecting a promotion in the Ministry of Education, advises Ling to take a break from work to avoid complicating his promotion.

Ling, driving Wei Lun home in her car one last time, informs him that they cannot continue the affair. A heartbroken Wei Lun leaves the car, causing Ling to chase after him into an open field in the rain. Wei Lun tearfully hugs Ling, who tells him to get used to rejection. Ling and Andrew divorce. Andrew's lawyer highlighted an additional clause stipulating Andrew will not be held to paternal responsibilities in the event Ling becomes pregnant through his frozen sperm. Ling declares that she will not use them and wishes Andrew well with his newfound partner. They part ways.

Having discovered she is pregnant through a spontaneous home pregnancy test, Ling experiences a gamut of mixed emotions in her apartment, now stripped of its furniture, soon to be sold away. She returns to her hometown in Taiping, Malaysia, and helps her mother hang the laundry. She stands outside, gazing at the sun that never came while she was in Singapore.

== Cast ==
- Yeo Yann Yann as Ling
- Christopher Lee as Andrew
- Koh Jia Ler as Kok Wei Lun
- Yang Shi Bin as Father-in-law
- Zhu Xiufeng as Auntie

== Production ==
The film is Anthony Chen's second feature film, six years later after his first film Ilo Ilo which was released in 2013. Development of Wet Season took six years, with Chen taking three years to write the screenplay and another year for casting. The film reunites Malaysian actress Yeo Yann Yann and Singaporean actor Koh Jia Ler who previously starred in Ilo Ilo. Filming took place in Singapore in May 2018 and wrapped that same month. Scenes with rain were mostly shot with rain machines, with the final critical sequence requiring an elaborate rigging system coupled with rain machines elevated by a construction mover.

== Release ==
The film had its world premiere at the Toronto International Film Festival on 8 September 2019 as part of the Platform Prize program. The film also served as the opening film for the Singapore International Film Festival on 21 November 2019. It was screened at many film festivals including the London East Asian Film Festival, Cairo International Film Festival, and the 56th Golden Horse Film Festival.

Local cinema chain Golden Village Pictures picked up distribution rights and released the film in Singapore on 28 November 2019. It is released on 31 January 2020 in Taiwan, 19 February 2020 in France, 12 March 2020 in Malaysia.

== Reception ==
=== Critical response ===
On the review aggregator website Rotten Tomatoes, Wet Season has a rating of 82% based on 22 reviews, with an average rating of 7.6/10. The site's critical consensus reads, "Wet Season uses one woman's painful emergence into self-determination to critically -- and engrossingly -- examine the balance of power in relationships."

Jordan Mintzer of The Hollywood Reporter praised the film for portraying Singapore's decapitated class division, social issues and the performances from the two leads. But he was critical of its pacing with the relationship of Wei Lun and Ling, saying that "...the film takes its precious time to get there."

Writing for ScreenDaily, Allan Hunter highlighted the director's strength in the "delicate handling of complex relationships" and talked about the extravagant layers that the characters of Wei Lun and Ling have with each other. Variety's Alissa Simon gave a positive review, highlighting the social issues and mature themes as well as Sam Care's cinematography and music.

=== Accolades ===
The film garnered six nominations and won one award at the 56th Golden Horse Awards. It was nominated for Best Feature Film, Best Director, Best Original Screenplay (both Anthony Chen), two Best Supporting Actors (Koh Jia Ler, Yang Shi Bin), and Best Actress in which Yeo Yann Yann won.

Date	Award	Category	Nominee(s)	Result	Ref
23 November 2019	56th Golden Horse Awards	Best Feature Film		Nominated	
23 November 2019	56th Golden Horse Awards	Best Director	Anthony Chen	Nominated	
23 November 2019	56th Golden Horse Awards	Best Leading Actress	Yeo Yann Yann	Won	
23 November 2019	56th Golden Horse Awards	Best Supporting Actor	Koh Jia Ler	Nominated	
23 November 2019	56th Golden Horse Awards	Best Supporting Actor	Yang Shi Bin	Nominated	
23 November 2019	56th Golden Horse Awards	Best Original Screenplay	Anthony Chen	Nominated	

== See also ==
- List of submissions to the 93rd Academy Awards for Best International Feature Film
- List of Singaporean submissions for the Academy Award for Best International Feature Film
