= Yeo Yann Yann =

Malaysian actress (born 1977)

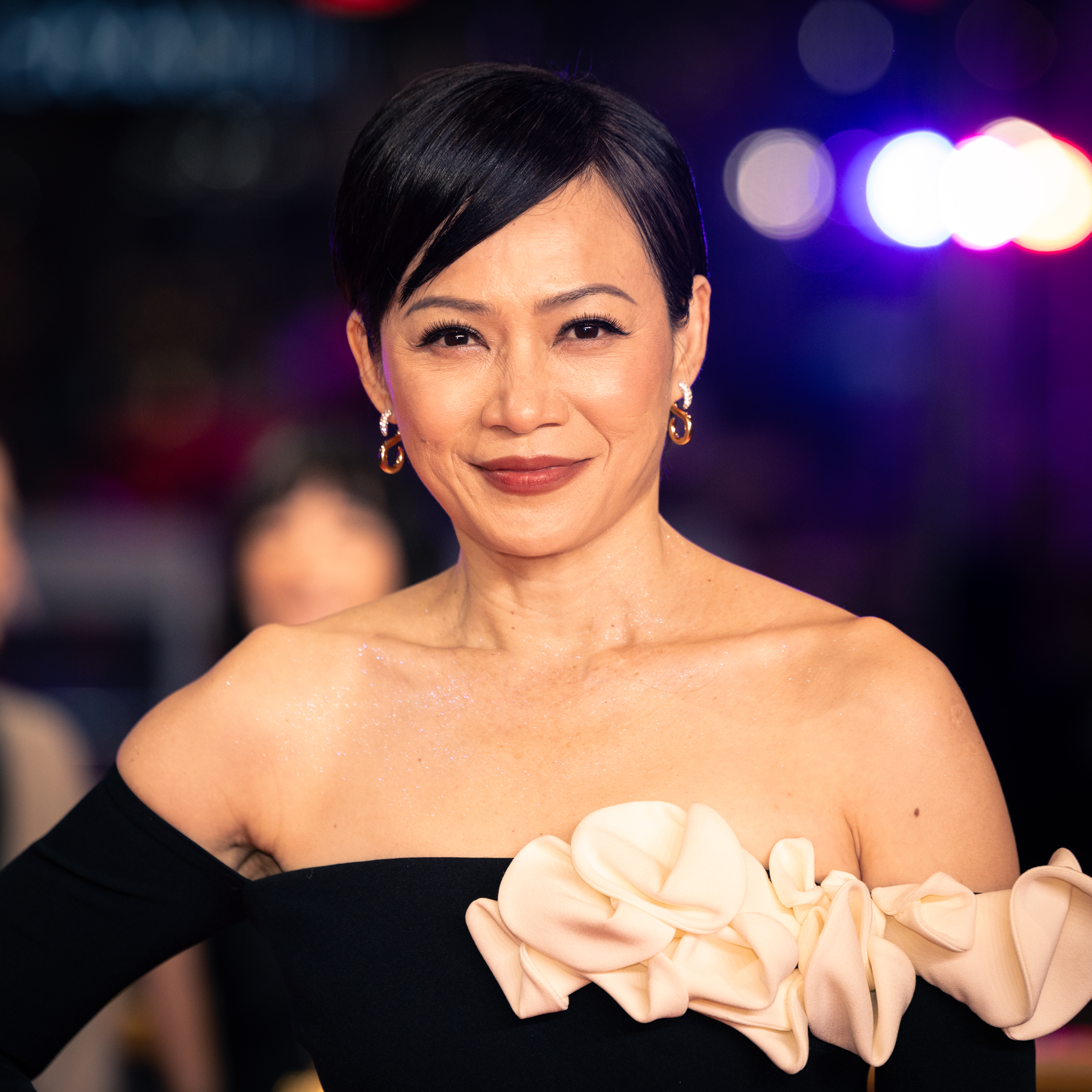
- Yeo in 2026
- Born: 20 February 1977 (age 49); Johor, Malaysia
- Other names: Yann Yeo; Yang Yanyan
- Occupation: Actress
- Years active: 1997–present
- Spouse: Ma Yuk-sing (m. 2012)
- Children: 1

Chinese name
- Traditional Chinese: 楊雁雁
- Simplified Chinese: 杨雁雁
- Hanyu Pinyin: Yáng Yànyàn
- Hokkien POJ: Iûⁿ Gān-gān

Yeo Yann Yann (born 20 February 1977) is a Singapore-based Malaysian actress. She has worked in theatre, television, and film in both English and Mandarin Chinese. Her credits include Singapore Dreaming, Thunderstorm, 881, Ilo Ilo and Wet Season.

She is a pioneer-graduate of Intercultural Theatre Institute (ITI). Besides acting, Yeo also hosts bilingual events and performs for corporate skits and projects.

== Early life and education ==
Yeo was born to a fisherman in Kukup, Pontian district, Johor, Malaysia. Yeo left Malaysia when she was 19 to study at Intercultural Theatre Institute in Singapore.

== Career ==
Yeo cites her acting mentor, the late theatre doyen Kuo Pao Kun, as a significant influence in her career.

In 1997, Yeo made her theatre debut with Comedy of Mistakes by Toy Factory Production.

Yeo started her acting career, portraying Chen Mei Li in The Right Frequency, a 1998 Mediacorp drama.

After appearing as Mei in the 2006 film Singapore Dreaming, Yeo was noticed and became famous. The film won the Montblanc New Screenwriters Award at the 54th San Sebastian International Film Festival, and was the first Singaporean film to receive an IFFPA-recognised international feature film award.

Yeo has also been featured in the Singapore Speak Chinese campaign (华语cool!), in-character from her role in the Royston Tan's 2007 film 881.

Yeo had also starred in various television productions, including Food Goin' Bananas (2008) and The A-Go-Go Princess (2009). In 2009 also, she played the leading role in The Iron Lady, produced by ntv7.

In 2013, Yeo played as the mother of the protagonist in Anthony Chen's first feature film, Ilo Ilo. The film debuted at the 2013 Cannes Film Festival where it received a 15-minute long "standing ovation" and earned Chen the Camera d'Or. Singapore Prime Minister Lee Hsien Loong noted Chen's achievement, and congratulated him and the film's cast on Facebook. The film continued to win success at various film festivals with Yeo picking up awards such as Best Supporting Actress at the 50th Golden Horse Awards, Best Actress at the Vladivostok Film Festival, Best Supporting Actress at the 8th Asian Film Awards among others.

In spring 2018, Yeo reunites with Chen for his second feature film, Wet Season. The film premiered at the Toronto International Film Festival and went on to be nominated for six Golden Horse Awards, with Yeo winning her second Golden Horse, for Best Leading Actress.

In 2020, Yeo was cast as Lian in HBO Asia’s Invisible Stories.

In 2021, Yeo acted as a triad boss in a supporting role in action thriller film Havoc, starring Tom Hardy, written and directed by Gareth Evans. The film was released on Netflix in 2025.

In 2022, Yeo acted as the mother of the main character in American Born Chinese, a television series adaption of a 2006 graphic novel American Born Chinese by Gene Luen Yang, an American fantasy action comedy television sitcom created by Kelvin Yu for Disney+. The series consists of eight episodes and premiered on Disney+ on 24 May 2023.

== Personal life ==
Yeo met Hong Kong action choreographer Ma Yuk-sing, who is seventeen years her senior, in 2012 while filming Petaling Street Warriors and were married within the year at her hometown. They have a daughter born in August 2012. In 2013, Yeo moved to Singapore due to post-partum depression.

== Filmography ==
=== Feature film ===
Year	Title	Role	Notes	Ref.
2006	High Cost of Living			
2006	Singapore Dreaming	Mei		
2006	One Last Dance			
2007	881	Big Papaya		
2008	12 Lotus	Long 2's girlfriend		
2008	Muallaf	Cindy		
2008	18 Grams of Love (愛情18克)			
2009	Love Matters	Jia Li		
2010	Being Human	Zu Er		
2010	When Hainan Meets Teochew	Meihui		
2011	Petaling Street Warriors	Zhung Lichun		
2013	Paper Moon (紙月亮)			
2013	The Collector (收爛數)			
2013	Ilo Ilo	Hwee Leng		
2014	The Cage (懼場)	Ma Yan Ling		
2014	Rubbers	Baoling		
2015	Distance			
2015	The Laundryman	Yang Yingying		
2017	You Mean the World to Me	Hoon		
2018	Lee Chong Wei	Khor Kim Choi		
2018	Republic of Food	Virginia Goh		
2019	Wet Season	Ling	Won Best Leading Actress at the 56th Golden Horse Awards	
2019	The 9th Precinct (第九分局)	Sun Yu-shu		
2023	The King of Musang King	Liu Mei Lian		
2025	Havoc	Tsui's Mother		
2026	We Are All Strangers	Bee Hwa		

=== Short film ===
Year	Title	Role	Notes	Ref.
2003	The Last Flight of the Red Butterflies			
2005	Heave			
2006	Hello?			
2006	Tracks			
2007	Ah Ma			
2007	Flat Dreams			
2009	Tanjong rhu (The Casuarina Cove)			

=== Television series ===
Year	Title	Role	Notes	Ref.
1998	Right Frequency	Chen Meili		
2006	Stories of Love: Anthology Series			
2007	Do Not Disturb			
2008	The A-Go-Go Princess (穿越阿哥哥)			
2008	Food Goin' Bananas			
2009	The Iron Lady	Gao Shiqin		
2011	A Time To Embrace (追影·築夢)	Zhang Jinrui		
2011	Time FM (時光電台)	Lucky		
2011	Home (家緣)			
2012	The Descendant			
2013	Time FM 1970 (時光電台1970)	Lucky		
2020	Invisible Stories	Lian		
2022	Modern Love Mumbai	Sui	Episode Mumbai Dragon (2022)	
2023	American Born Chinese	Christine Wang		

=== Music video appearances ===
Year	Artist	Song title
2021	Stefanie Sun	"The Day Before"

=== Other production ===
Year	Title
2005	GhostBoys (series for 3G phones)
2005	POV Murder (series for 3G phones)

== Theatre ==
Year	Title	Produced by	Role	Ref
1997	Comedy of Mistakes	Toy Factory		
1998	Storm	Toy Factory		
1999	Red Hawk	The Theatre Practice		
2000	Invisibility	Drama Box		
2000	The Day I Met The Prince	The Theatre Practice		
2001	Dragon Dance	The Finger Players		
2003	The Tiger Tally	TTRP		
2003	Tartuffe	TTRP		
2003	Lim Tzay Chuen	TTRP/Theatreworks		
2003	Lights Up	The Theatre Practice		
2004	Water Station	TTRP		
2004	Tempest	The Theatre Practice		
2004	Private Parts	Vizpro		
2004	Wu Jun Ru And You and Me And Him (吴君如和你和我和他)	The Theatre Practice		
2005	Boxing Day	The Necessary Stage		
2005	The Admiral's Odyssey	Action Theatre		
2005	Separation Forty	The Necessary Stage		
2006	A Beautiful Companion	Theatreworks		
2006	Stranger at Home (独在家乡为异客)	DramaBox		
2006	National Language Class	Spell Seven Performance Club		
2006	Thunderstorm (雷雨)	The Theatre Practice		
2006	Legends Alive Online : Mama Looking For Her Cat 2006	The Theatre Practice		
2007	The Tosca Project	The Theatre Practice		
2008	Chesty Nutty Bang Bang: The Hairspray of the Phoenix	STAGES		
2008	National Language Class (re-run)	Spell Seven Performance Club		
2008	To Kill A Mockingbird	Sharon Ang		
2009	Crab Flower Club	Toy Factory Productions		
2011	Petaling Street Warriors	Juita Entertainment		
2016	State of Mind	Playground Entertainment		
2017	Actor, Forty《演员四十》	The Necessary Stage		

== Awards and nominations ==
Year	Awards	Category	Nominated work	Result	Ref.
2005	5th LIFE! Theatre Awards	Best Ensemble Acting	Wu Jun Ru And You And Me And Him	Nominated	
2006	1st Front Awards	—N/a	—N/a	Nominated	
2007	7th LIFE! Theatre Awards	Best Ensemble Acting	Mama Looking For Her Cat	Won	
2007	7th LIFE! Theatre Awards	Best Actress	Thunderstorm	Won	
2009	9th LIFE! Theatre Awards	Best Actress	National Language Class	Nominated	
2010	Golden Awards	Best Actress	The Iron Lady	Won	
2012	Golden Awards	Best Supporting Actress	Time FM	Won	
2013	50th Golden Horse Awards	Best Supporting Actress	Ilo Ilo	Won	
2013	Vladivostok Film Festival	Best Actress	Ilo Ilo	Won	
2014	8th Asian Film Awards	Best Supporting Actress	Ilo Ilo	Won	
2019	30th Malaysia Film Festival	Best Female Supporting Actress	Lee Chong Wei: Rise of the Legend	Nominated	
2019	56th Golden Horse Awards	Best Leading Actress	Wet Season	Won	
2020	14th Asian Film Awards	Best Actress	Wet Season	Nominated	
2020	48th International Emmy Awards	Best Performance By An Actress	Invisible Stories	Nominated	
2023	3rd Hollywood Critics Association TV Awards	Best Supporting Actress in a Streaming Series, Comedy	American Born Chinese	Nominated	
