= Oscar Chiu =

Taiwanese actor

- 邱志宇
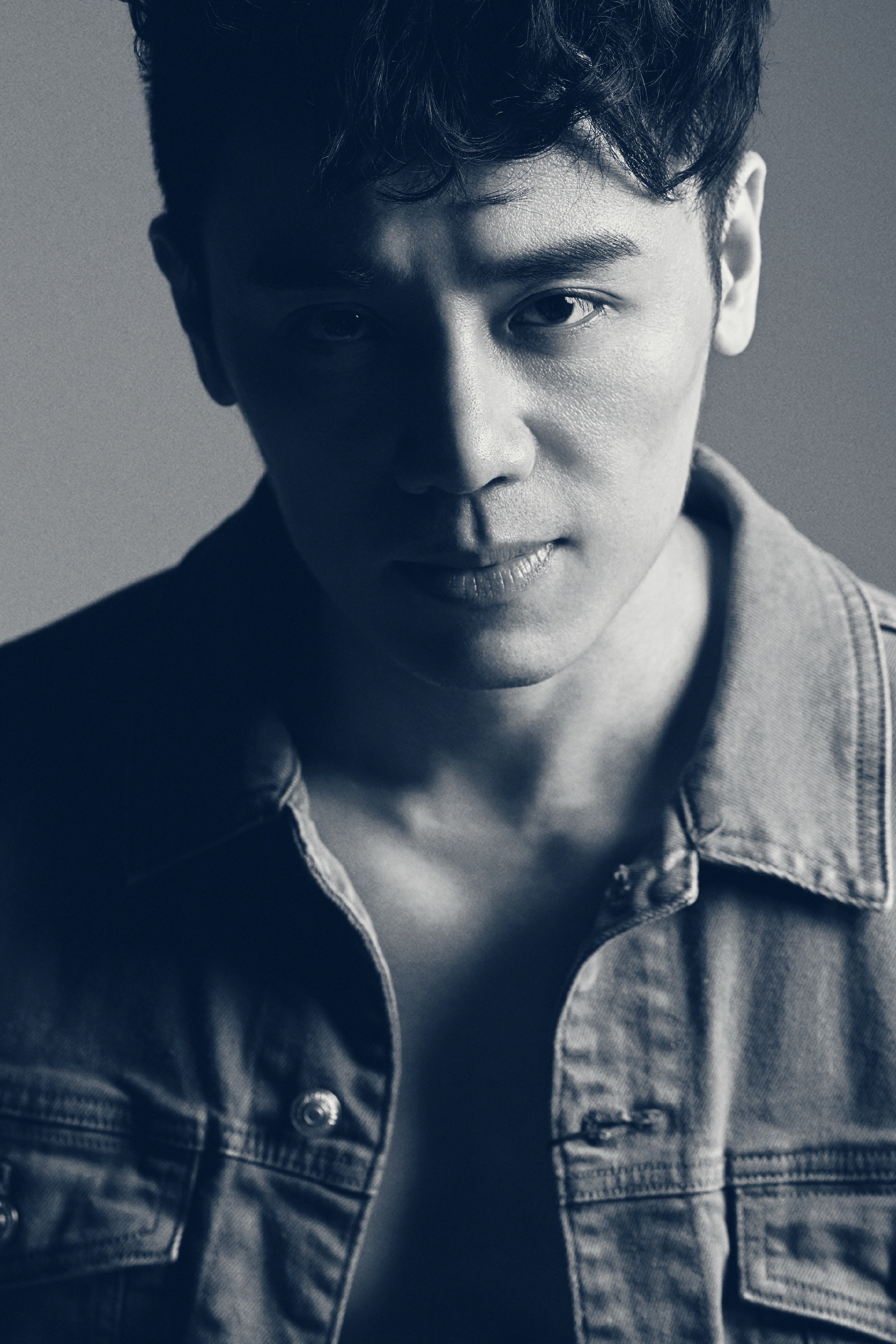
- Chiu in May 2021
- Born: Oscar Chiu; Taiwan
- Education: Fu Jen Catholic University (BA)
- Occupation: Actor
- Years active: 2017–present

Oscar Chiu (Chinese: 邱志宇) is a Taiwanese actor best known for his roles as Tony in Story in Taipei (2017) and Kevin Zhang in The Teacher (2019). He was nominated for Best New Performer in the 56th Golden Horse Awards with the latter role.

== Biography ==
Chiu was raised in Taoyuan, Taiwan. He wasn't interested in performing until a friend invited him to participate in a competition during junior high school. At the age of 17, he was invited to join an acting agency in Taipei, only to discover that it was a scam. He later attended Fu Jen Catholic University and obtained a Bachelor of Arts in philosophy. After graduation, Chiu explored various career paths and participated in a singing competition. However, aside from his work as a cast extra in films, all of his endeavors ended in failure.

In 2017, Chiu received his breakout role as Tony in the cult film Story in Taipei at the age of 31. The role garnered him widespread recognition, and many began to refer to him by his character's name "Tony". He was subsequently cast in larger film roles, and landed another lead role in the 2019 homosexual romance film The Teacher. Chiu's performances, which included several nude scenes, received positive acclaim once again, and he received a nomination for Best New Performer in the 56th Golden Horse Awards with the role. In 2021, he was cast in a main role in the drama film Final Exam and a recurring role in the Netflix romance series More Than Blue: The Series. Chiu also applied to National Taiwan University of Arts to pursue a Master of Arts in performing arts in the same year.

== Filmography ==
=== Film ===
Year	Title	Role	Notes/Ref.
2017	Story in Taipei	Tony	
2018	Let's Cheat Together	Wu Xiao-kai (吳曉開)	
2019	Synapses	Ah Wen (阿文)	
2019	The Teacher	Kevin Zhang (張凱文)	
2021	Final Exam	Mr. Chiu	
2024	The Lyricist Wannabe	Ko	Cameo

=== Television ===
Year	Title	Role	Notes/Ref.
2017	Lion Pride	Young Zhong Yan	Guest role
2018	HIStory	Jiang Xiao-pang (江兆鵬)	Main role (season 2)
2020	Adventure of the Ring	Money Wu	Guest role
2020	The Story of Three Springs	Ou Shun-cheng (區順成)	Main role
2021	The Arc of Life	Q Mao (Q毛)	Guest role
2021	More Than Blue: The Series	Oscar	Recurring role
2021	Fragrance of the First Flower	Kai (阿凱)	Main role
2023	At the Moment	Chichi	Guest role

== Awards and nominations ==
Year	Award	Category	Work	Result	Ref.
2019	56th Golden Horse Awards	Best New Performer	The Teacher	Nominated	
