= Lü Hsueh-feng =

Taiwanese actress

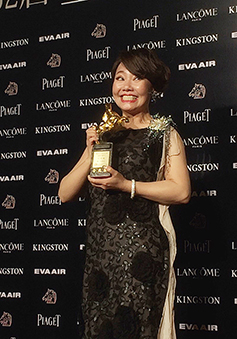
- Lü in 2015
- Born: 8 May 1964 (age 62); Taiwan
- Spouse: Huang Jui-Te (1989–1999)

Chinese name
- Traditional Chinese: 呂雪鳳
- Simplified Chinese: 吕雪凤
Transcriptions
Standard Mandarin
- Hanyu Pinyin: Lǚ Xuěfèng

Lü Hsueh-feng (Chinese: 吕雪凤; pinyin: Lǚ Xuěfèng, born 8 May 1964) is a Taiwanese actress. In 2015, she won the Golden Horse Award for Best Supporting Actress for her performance in the film Thanatos, Drunk.

== Early life ==
Lü Hsueh-feng was born into a family of songs and operas. Her parents were singers and actresses. Therefore, she was born and walked through the troupe. She was singing at the stage when she was 3 years old, and she was acting at the age of 5, from the early wild stage play, combined with the "sliding sweep" of the drug sales group. (referring to the Taiwanese opera that was performed on the ground instead of the stage), she went through the performances of the Grand Theatre after the 1980s.

At the age of 16, he participated in Taichung "New Life Music" to learn about Nan Guan Xiao Sheng and Xiao Dan and Harlequin. He then went to the Philippines to perform with the group. At the age of 17, he joined the "Zhu Yufeng" to learn the Taiwanese opera. At the age of 18, he became a youngster. He joined the "Lianxing" and "Yuxing" opera troupe classes in Taichung. In order to improve the performance skills, he used to study other operas such as Peking Opera and Hakka Opera. Xiaosheng, Tongsheng and Harlequin.

== Selected filmography ==
- When Love Comes (2010)
- The Golden Child (2012)
- Thanatos, Drunk (2015)
- Never Ending Road (2017)
- Synapses (2019)
- The Soul (2021)

== Awards and nominations ==
=== Chinese Film Media Awards ===
Year	Award	Performance	Result
2011	Best Supporting Actress	When Love Comes	Nominated
2013	Best Supporting Actress	The Golden Child	Nominated
2015	Best Supporting Actress	Thanatos, Drunk	Won

=== Golden Horse Awards ===
Year	Award	Performance	Result
2010	Best Supporting Actress	When Love Comes	Nominated
2015	Best Supporting Actress	Thanatos, Drunk	Won
2019	Best Leading Actress	The Beloved Stranger	Nominated

=== Taipei Film Awards ===
Year	Award	Performance	Result
2015	Best Supporting Actress	Thanatos, Drunk	Won
