= Ilo Ilo =

2013 Singaporean film by Anthony Chen

- Theatrical release poster
- Traditional Chinese: 爸媽不在家
- Simplified Chinese: 爸妈不在家
- Literal meaning: Mom and Dad Are Not Home
- Hanyu Pinyin: Bàmā bù zàijiā
- Hokkien POJ: Pē-má put chāi-ke
- Directed by: Anthony Chen
- Written by: Anthony Chen
- Produced by: Ang Hwee Sim; Anthony Chen; Wahyuni A. Hadi
- Starring: Chen Tianwen; Yeo Yann Yann; Angeli Bayani; Koh Jia Ler
- Cinematography: Benoit Soler
- Edited by: Hoping Chen; Joanne Cheong
- Production companies: Singapore Film Commission; Ngee Ann Polytechnic; Fisheye Pictures
- Distributed by: Golden Village Pictures
- Release dates: May 19, 2013 (2013 Cannes Film Festival); August 29, 2013 (Singapore)
- Running time: 99 minutes
- Country: Singapore
- Languages: Singaporean Hokkien; English; Tagalog; Hiligaynon
- Budget: S$700,000
- Box office: S$1.2 million (Singapore)

Ilo Ilo (Chinese: 爸妈不在家; pinyin: Bàmā bù zàijiā; lit. 'Mom and Dad Are Not Home') is a 2013 Singaporean drama film directed and written by Anthony Chen. It is Chen's debut feature film and stars Singaporean actor Chen Tianwen, Malaysian actress Yeo Yann Yann, Filipino actress Angeli Bayani, and first-time child actor Koh Jia Ler. Ilo Ilo revolves around a middle-class Singaporean family who employs a domestic worker from the Philippines at the onset of the 1997 Asian financial crisis.

Chen based the film on his personal experiences in living with a Filipino domestic worker from Iloilo, a province in the Philippines. He ideated for the feature film, which was initially an autobiography, after finishing his studies at the National Film and Television School in England and returning to Singapore. Writing began in June 2010, and filming took place from May to June 2012. The film was partially funded by the Singapore Film Commission, Ngee Ann Polytechnic, and an award from Tokyo Filmex.

Ilo Ilo premiered at the 2013 Cannes Film Festival as part of the Directors' Fortnight on 19 May 2013. The film was awarded the Caméra d'Or award and became the first Singaporean feature film to receive an award at the Cannes Film Festival. This led to a media campaign to locate the overseas Filipino worker Chen had lived with, whom he could identify only by her nickname and two photographs. The film was released in Singapore on 29 August 2013, and generally received positive reception for its storytelling and cast performances. Ilo Ilo became the first Singaporean film to win the Golden Horse Award for Best Feature Film and was selected as the Singaporean entry for the Best Foreign Language Film at the 86th Academy Awards.

== Plot ==
In Singapore during the 1997 Asian financial crisis, the Lim family welcomes their domestic helper Teresa, colloquially known as Terry. Terry is an overseas Filipino worker who has come from Iloilo to support her infant son. The father, Teck, works in sales for a glass company; the pregnant mother, Hwee Leng, works as a secretary in a downsizing shipping company; and the ten-year-old son, Jiale, is a troubled delinquent. Jiale and Terry exhibit a troubled relationship at first. One day, Jiale climbs over the school fence at dismissal time just to avoid his maid, who comes every day to fetch him. He is forced to rely on Terry after he accidentally collides with a car while biking, and has to temporarily use an arm cast.

When Teck loses his sales job, he conceals it from his wife. He accepts a temporary job as a security guard monitoring an egg farm. As he continues to lose money in the stock market, he acknowledges their losses to his wife, who lambastes him. Terry also finds a side job at Lucky Plaza as a hairstylist, which she keeps a secret from her employers. Jiale and Terry begin to grow closer, sparking his mother's jealousy and leaving her feeling emotionally neglected. On the family's drive to an extended family reunion, Hwee Leng and Teck argue whether Teck should resign from his job and start a bubble tea shop. Teck is annoyed by the sounds of Jiale's Tamagotchi and throws the toy out of the window. In the following week, Teck and Hwee Leng give Jiale pet chicks for his birthday, which are eventually slaughtered. Hwee Leng attends a motivational seminar and is convinced by the optimistic words of the speaker to purchase his merchandise – only to discover he is a fraud.

Jiale is enthusiastic in his collection of past-winning lottery numbers, which he catalogues in his schoolbook. One day, after being taunted by another boy that Terry only loves him as part of her job, he pushes the boy against a bathroom wall, hospitalizing him. Threatened with expulsion and the school's administration unable to contact his parents, Terry arrives to plead for mercy on his behalf. Hwee Leng later shows up and sharply reminds Terry that she is Jiale's mother. Later, Jiale is caned in front of the school assembly.

After the family car is sold for scrap and Teck is fired from his job for breaking several crates while chasing a robber, the Lim family acknowledge they can no longer afford to keep Terry employed. Desperate to keep her, Jiale uses his savings to purchase lottery tickets but loses. He becomes despondent and cuts a lock of Terry's hair during a tense farewell at the airport. Holding onto her cassette player, Jiale and his father listens to Terry's favorite song, "Kahapon at Pag-ibig" (Note: lit. 'Yesterday and Love') by Asin, in the hospital as Hwee Leng gives birth to a baby girl.

== Cast ==
- Chen Tianwen as Teck, the father
- Yeo Yann Yann as Hwee Leng, the mother
- Koh Jia Ler as Jiale
- Angeli Bayani as Teresa, known as "Terry"

== Production ==
=== Development ===
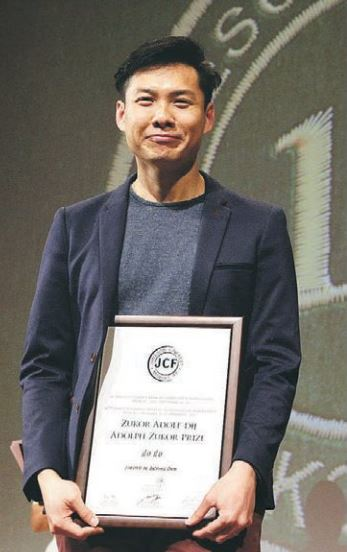
Anthony Chen (pictured in 2013) wrote and directed the film in his directorial debut.

Ilo Ilo was directed and written by Anthony Chen. Chen based the film on his personal experiences, particularly his family's Filipino maid referred to as "Aunt Terry". He recalled that his family employed "Terry" from 1988, when he was aged four, to 1997, when he was aged twelve. Chen, who finished his master's degree at the National Film and Television School, decided to create his first feature film and returned to Singapore to "make something personal". While ideating his feature film, he experienced sudden recurring memories of his childhood and wanted to rediscover the emotion he felt in his farewell to "Terry". "Terry" returned to Iloilo, a province in the Philippines, in 1997 during the 1997 Asian financial crisis.

Scriptwriting began on June 2010 and took two to three years. Chen initially wrote Ilo as an autobiographical film, but decided not to after he gained more objectivity towards the material and thought that an autobiography would not fit in a narrative structure. He revised an initial draft that included Chen's two younger brothers after he shifted more focus on the emotions and the characters. The personalities of Chen and the character Jiale contrasted; Chen described that he was "prim and proper [and] probably the one being bullied" in his childhood. While several events and characters were dramatized, some scenes that Chen based on his experience was Teck's termination of employment and the maid's slaughter of Jiale's pet chickens.

Ilo Ilo was the first word Chen wrote while writing for the film, as he recalled that the maid came from Iloilo. He considered 25 titles for the film at first before choosing Ilo Ilo. Chen based the Chinese title on children whose parents both work most of the time. Chen searched for any old Filipino song to use in the closing credits by searching at iTunes, and coincidentally found "Kahapon at Pag-ibig" by Asin. When the production staff inquired the song's rights to its singer Lolita Carbon, she only requested a DVD copy of the film. Chen deliberately avoided showing subtitles for the credits song.

Ang Hwee Sim, Anthony Chen, and Wahyuni A. Hadi produced the film. The film's budget is estimated to be around S$500,000, (Note: Other sources claim that the budget was around S$700,000.) and was partially funded by Ngee Ann Polytechnic for S$200,000 and the Singapore Film Commission's New Feature Film Fund. Chen also received ¥300,000 after the production project won the Tokyo Filmex Next Masters Best Project 2010 award on 28 November.

=== Pre-production and filming ===
A cheap hotel room served as the audition space for around 30 to 40 women who auditioned for the role of Terry, the Filipino maid. Angeli Bayani, who received the role of Terry, was the last auditionee and arrived from a theatre show. Yeo Yann Yann, who would play as Jiale's mother, had previously worked with Chen in his 2007 short film Ah Ma. Chen had to rewrite the script after Yeo informed him of her pregnancy in December 2011. He also filmed the delivery of Yeo's daughter via a caesarian section for the concluding scene. The production staff took ten months to find an actor for Jiale's role. Out of 2,000 child auditionees from at least 20 schools, 150 were selected for six months of acting workshops, including a friend of Koh Jia Ler. Koh, who was rejected for additional screening, received the role after discreetly asking a casting assistant. Koh was caned in two takes with protective pads for a scene.

Filming took place for 27 days from May to June 2012. Filming locations include a five-room flat in Tampines, as well as Jurong and other housing estates. A key sequence where Jiale shows Terry a city skyline, which was used for the film poster, was filmed on a Housing and Development Board (HDB) block at Teban Gardens without permission. Requests to permit filming at building rooftops were rejected by the town council and government agencies, and the crew accidentally found access to the roof. The production staff checked around 500 HDB flats within one month to find a primary filming location. Chen wanted a five-room flat located on the second or third floor with uncoloured tiles and door grills "with oval-ish or rounded rectangles", according to a production assistant. A handheld camera was used for filming.

== Themes ==
Ilo Ilo, which is a representation of a middle-class Singaporean family coping with the 1997 Asian financial crisis, is regarded as a film a clef for Chen's motivation to create the film. Arriola argues that Ilo Ilo portrays the centrality of family in Asian societies by showing dynamics within the Lim family and their respectful attitude to Terry, along with Terry's congregation with Filipino domestic workers at Lucky Plaza (Note: Lucky Plaza is considered a popular meeting hub among Filipinos in Singapore.) and support for her family in the Philippines. Characters also represent the theme of identifying with their nationality, which Arriola identifies in scenes where Jiale recites the Singapore National Pledge, and the Lim family respects Terry's Catholic grace as a representation of Singapore's multiculturalism. Several scholars have discussed the difference between the themes emphasized by the Chinese title, which is based on a Cantonese children's song about hospitality, and the English title Ilo Ilo, which indicates Singapore's reliance on foreign labor.

The Philippine government began a labor exportation program in the 1970s to address its high unemployment rate. Meanwhile, Singapore experienced rapid economic development and encouraged the entry of middle-class women, who were traditionally involved in household work, into white-collar professions. To maintain its birth rates, the state introduced the Foreign Maids Scheme in 1978 to begin the import of domestic workers into the country. The decreasing number of local household workers prior to 1997 also led to the demand for foreign domestic workers (FDWs) from countries such as the Philippines, Indonesia, Myanmar, and India. FDWs are prohibited from overstaying their contracts or accepting additional work, which can result in the forfeiture of bond money from employers. The involvement of FDWs in familial lives complicates conventional ideas of family, according to Leow. Cheah compares Hwee Leng to Gayle Rubin's description that a FDW is one of the necessities of a wife for her to be able to work for a postindustrial economy. The 1995 execution of domestic worker Flor Contemplacion also strained diplomacy relations between the Philippines and Singapore, which Piocos attributed depictions of the "abusive 'madam' and the victimized 'maid'" to. Some scholars found the representation of FDWs in Singaporean literature and film as racially stereotyped or “metonymic of an emerging racialized [...] class system".

Ilo Ilo shows the structural injustices experienced by FDWs, such as the risk of repatriation from having part-time jobs, and a common practice of giving their passport to their employers, according to Ubaldo. They also argue that Ilo Ilo presents the role of domestic workers in the collapse and rebirth of Singapore in the 1997 Asian financial crisis, signified with the birth of Jiale's sibling in the conclusion. Moreover, Ubaldo notices that some local Singaporean media interprets the nationalization of Singapore's transnationalism as the theme of Ilo Ilo. Piocos observes that the film's shift of camerawork reflected Terry's developing intimacy with Jiale. The film uses blurry close-up shots in its first sequences of Terry, such as her accidentally witnessing a suicide, to communicate her trauma and alienation in Singapore. Wide shots of public places are then used after Jiale shows Terry a cityspace from the rooftop, which Piocos interprets as Terry's confrontation with her trauma.

Chen's film also focuses on the portrayal of a non-cosmopolitan Singaporean family's relationship and their FDWs. However, Cheah argues that this theme avoids discussion on the inequalities faced by Filipino domestic workers, or economic inequalities in Southeast Asia. They identify the film's criticism of state-sponsored narratives of the development of Singapore, referred to as the Singapore Story, by showing that the exploitation of domestic workers were involved. The introduction of Terry also explores the social and economic insecurities lower middle-class Singaporean families experience. Moreover, Terry serves as a sensitive outsider who witnesses their insecurities to the point of functioning as a moral compass. Various scenes also depict how middle-class social and economic insecurities can directly compromise familial happiness, such as dependence on speculative money-earning. For Cheah, the film seems to justify the exploitation of the FDW by showing structural and social issues that affect Singaporean families. They also reason that the film focuses on economic inequality in Singapore through noting that the film lacks any allusion to the 1995 execution of Flor Contemplacion, despite Ilo Ilo being set two years after. Cheah also identifies the theme of maternal care from Jiale's rearing of pet chickens, Hwee Leng's pregnancy, and the lyrics of the concluding song, which juxtaposes the cycle of insecurity and destructive behavior. However, the movie still sentimentalizes human sympathy and recreates a politics of pity discussed in Hannah Arendt's On Revolution. Cheah writes that in the film's conclusion, Jiale's family and Terry feel compassion for but cannot help each other, which can construct a similar structure of pity between the viewer and the characters.

Ho provides a reading of Ilo Ilo through Lauren Berlant's and Kathleen Stewart's affect theory in a transnational context and argued that the Singapore Story, which can extend to the idealistic hope of success, is maintained through "bad" objects of desire and necessitates female migrant labor. In Ilo Ilo, characters become "cruelly optimistic" and rely on "bad" objects of desire to attain dreams of financial success, such as Teck's reliance on stocks, Hwee Leng's registration for a motivational workshop, and Jiale's 4-D hobby. By doing so, the film observes the characters' desire and failed attempt to gain wealth or resolve their crises, and criticizes the Singapore Story as a myth. Ho cites an example of some sequences that illustrate the FDW's vulnerable position as an outsider and a potential source of conflict among Singaporean families, which can lead to maltreatment: Hwee Leng discovers a cigarette Jiale stole and accuses Terry of smoking, which results in an argument between Hwee Leng and Teck after he admits his smoking habit. Terry's affective labor also questions the Singapore Story by showing that the narrative necessitates women from less developed countries to leave their families, and its failure for certain groups of non-Singaporeans.

== Release ==
Production of the film was first announced in July 2012 for a 2013 release, which was then specified in January 2013 to be at the third quarter of that year. In May, Ilo Ilo was announced for a Singapore release at August 2013 with Golden Village as the distributor. Ilo Ilo premiered on 19 May 2013 in the Director's Fortnight, a parallel section of the 2013 Cannes Film Festival. Power outages occasionally interrupted the screening; the audience continued singing in a scene where characters sing "Happy Birthday". The film received a 15-minute standing ovation.

The first public screening in Singapore was held on 21 August at Golden Village VivoCity for selected The Straits Times readers, followed by the gala premiere on 24 August at Marina Bay Sands attended by President of Singapore Tony Tan. The film was theatrically released in Singapore on 29 August. The Philippine premiere, attended by Chen and Bayani, was held at Robinsons Galleria on 13 November. The film premiered in Iloilo on 1 December. The Singapore Tourism Board held a pre-screening at Resorts World Manila the following day, and the film was theatrically released in the Philippines on 4 December.

Chen had no information on "Terry" throughout production, except for her first name and two photographs of her. After the film won the Camera d'Or, several Philippine media agencies launched a campaign to search for her. She was found two weeks later after her niece heard of the campaign. "Terry" and Anthony reunited in San Miguel, Iloilo, after 16 years of losing contact. The maid is Teresita Sajonia, who has been in San Miguel, since the Chen's employment. Teresita joined the 24 August screening in Singapore through a flight sponsored by Cebu Pacific. She also joined the premiere in Iloilo and the 2 December pre-screening.

Two film posters were prepared. One poster featured Jia Ler and Bayani looking over a landscape, and another for the Singaporean release featured the lead characters's faces placed on cartoon bodies and a drawing of a HDB building. Ilo Ilo was released on DVD around the 2014 Chinese New Year.

== Reception ==
=== Box office ===
Ilo Ilo earned S$210,000 in its opening weekend in Singapore. By 18 September 2013, it earned around S$680,000. Theatrical release concluded ten weeks after the opening with a box office of around S$900,000. Golden Village re-released Ilo Ilo on 21 November to commemorate the film's nominations at the 50th Golden Horse Awards on 23 November. The re-run continued until 11 December. The film earned more than S$2.8 million globally and around S$1.23 million in Singapore in 2013. Ilo Ilo grossed around €479,000 in France on 16 October after its theatrical release on 4 September, and reached top five in the Paris box office.

=== Critical reception ===
Ilo Ilo generally generally received positive reception. On the review aggregator website Rotten Tomatoes, 100% of 45 critics' reviews are positive, with an average rating of 7.8/10. The website's consensus reads: "Quietly compassionate and rich in detail, Ilo Ilo is a strikingly mature debut from writer-director Anthony Chen." Metacritic, which uses a weighted average, assigned the film a score of 85 out of 100, based on 12 critics, indicating "universal acclaim". Film critic Kenneth Turan of the Los Angeles Times opined that Chen's first film, which employs a neo-realistic style, "quietly demonstrates that in the right hands even the familiar stuff of everyday life can move us deeply".

Most reviewers praised the performances of the lead cast and the film's cinematography. For instance, Variety's Maggie Lee applauded Bayani's portrayal as a dignified and pragmatic Terry and her performance in the film's bittersweet ending. She also felt that Yeo's clumsy motion communicate her character's anxieties. The cinematography de-emphasizes the period setting and highlights the universality of the family's experiences through "deceptively plain [...] and faceless neighborhoods", according to Lee. For The Washington Post's Mark Jenkins, the film's "crowded compositions" express the film's intimacy and the "sense of life" in the city-state of Singapore. The Straits Times's John Lui also wrote that the film does not feel claustrophobic despite mostly being filmed in a housing flat. Meanwhile, Sight and Sound's Tony Rayns called Ilo Ilo "aesthetically conservative". Some critics noticed the film's use of "small but noticeable historical touches" such as period-specific appliances and fashion, pagers, and a Tamagotchi.

Several reviewers appreciated the film's avoidance of melodrama. Screen Daily's Tom Grierson argued that the film's setting of Singapore during the 1997 financial crisis and its inclusion of characters that are "trying to keep their heads afloat" amid uncertainties elevated the film from standard local dramas. For them, a conventional plot would have had Terry "teach inspirational life lessons" and change the family. Philippine Entertainment Portal's Mari-An Santos described Ilo Ilo as a "nostalgic yet fully-informed portrayal of life with a nanny". They also argued that it balances the perspectives of the Singaporean family and the overseas Filipino worker (OFW). Ilo Ilo also humanizes Terry and the Lim family, which resemble the two sides of an economic divide, according to Lui. Mikhail Lecaros of GMA News Online emphasized that the film delivers a "refreshing honest take" on the experiences of OFWs and presents Singaporean middle class lifestyle without forms of "sledgehammer commentary" used in Singaporean films similar to Money No Enough (1998); for them, the film "distills complex familial and societal issues into a straightforward, often funny, narrative". Several reviewers also pointed out elements of humor; Grierson called the film a comedy-drama. Moreover, Lui opined that local habits are depicted with comedy, as shown in scenes of enthusiasm on lottery or of a father comfortably wearing underwear at home. They also observed that some critics at early screenings said that Ilo Ilo "lacks narrative urgency".

Several critics discussed the characters' dynamics and the universality of the film's themes. Today's Martin Mayo felt that the script "fully fleshed out" the four protagonist and gave them "quirks that make them just that more memorable", such as Teck's discreet smoking habit or Jiale's hobby of collecting newspaper clippings. They also praised the genuineness of the film's setting using multiple minute details which bring a strong sense of uncertainty. The Guardian's Peter Bradshaw described Jiale's relationship with Terry, who gradually behaves as his mother, as "partly a Stockholm syndrome symptom [and] a genuine friendship". Film critic Stephen Holden also felt that the film refused to sentimentalize this relationship and instead drew audiences to empathize with its four protagonists. The issues discussed in Ilo Ilo apply to contexts outside its setting, according to some reviewers. South China Morning Post's Yvonne Teh added that the film connects to a broad audience despite being grounded in Singaporean culture, and described the film as a Singaporean version of Hong Kong film A Simple Life. Lee identified child-rearing as a theme through the use of pet chickens and opined that the impact of the financial crisis on the family looms further in the second half, which the Jiale and Terry relationship is smoothly incorporated into. Jenkins also considered money as instrumental to the film's narrative. In a critical review, Rayns argued that Ilo Ilo failed to examine the family's economic and parenting crisis in greater depth. They questioned the necessity of the two scenes in which Terry calls home on a public telephone, which only serve to compare Terry's home life with the Lim family and do not further her relationship with Jiale. Furthermore, they believed that the conflict between Hwee Leng and Terry in the scene of Jiale's expulsion could have been more "nuanced and sustained", as the scene ended only with a shot of Terry "alone and deflated".

== Accolades ==
Ilo Ilo is the first Singaporean film to win an award at the Cannes Film Festival. Chen is also the first Singaporean filmmaker to be awarded at the Cannes Film Festival, when his 2007 short film Ah Ma won the Special Mention at the Short Film Palme d'Or. Ilo Ilo is also the first Singaporean film to win the Golden Horse Award for Best Feature Film. The Singapore Film Commission selected Ilo Ilo as the Singaporean entry for the Best Foreign Language Film at the 86th Academy Awards. The American magazine Variety included Chen in its 10 Directors to Watch list for 2013.

Ilo Ilo accolades
Award	Date of ceremony	Category	Recipient(s) and Nominee(s)	Result	Ref.
Cannes Film Festival	26 May 2013	Caméra d'Or	Ilo Ilo	Won	
Pacific Meridian	13 September 2013	Best Feature	Ilo Ilo	Won	
Pacific Meridian	13 September 2013	NETPAC Prize for Best Film	Ilo Ilo	Won	
Pacific Meridian	13 September 2013	Best Actress	Yeo Yann Yann	Won	
Eurasia International Film Festival	20 September 2013	Best Actor	Koh Jia Ler	Won (Note: Award shared with Carlo Cecchi for Miele)	
Jameson Cinefest	22 September 2013	International Ecumenical Jury Prize	Ilo Ilo	Won	
Jameson Cinefest	22 September 2013	Grand Jury Prize	Ilo Ilo	Won	
Jameson Cinefest	22 September 2013	FIPRESCI Prize	Ilo Ilo	Won	
BFI London Film Festival	19 October 2013	Sutherland Trophy	Ilo Ilo	Won	
Montréal Festival of New Cinema	20 October 2013	Louve d'Or	Ilo Ilo	Nominated	
MAMI Mumbai Film Festival	24 October 2013	Best Director	Anthony Chen	Won	
MAMI Mumbai Film Festival	24 October 2013	Best Actress	Yeo Yann Yann	Won	
Philadelphia Film Festival	25 October 2013	Best Narrative Feature Film	Ilo Ilo	Won	
Philadelphia Film Festival	25 October 2013	Archie First Feature Award	Ilo Ilo	Nominated	
Molodist Film Festival	26 October 2013	Best Feature Film	Ilo Ilo	Won	
Molodist Film Festival	26 October 2013	FIPRESCI Prize	Ilo Ilo	Won	
Five Flavours Film Festival	10 November 2013	Special Mention	Ilo Ilo	Won	
Stockholm International Film Festival	15 November 2013	Bronze Horse Award	Ilo Ilo	Nominated	
Hong Kong Asian Film Festival	19 November 2013	New Talent Award	Anthony Chen	Won (Note: Award shared with Alphan Eşeli for The Long Way Home)	
Golden Horse Awards	23 November 2013	Best Feature Film	Ilo Ilo	Won	
Golden Horse Awards	23 November 2013	Best Supporting Actress	Yeo Yann Yann	Won	
Golden Horse Awards	23 November 2013	Best New Director	Anthony Chen	Won	
Golden Horse Awards	23 November 2013	Best Original Screenplay	Anthony Chen	Won	
Golden Horse Awards	23 November 2013	Best Supporting Actor	Chen Tianwen	Nominated	
Golden Horse Awards	23 November 2013	Best New Performer	Koh Jia Ler	Nominated	
Gijón International Film Festival	23 November 2013	Best Film	Ilo Ilo	Nominated	
Tokyo Filmex	1 December 2013	Audience Award	Ilo Ilo	Won	
Dubai International Film Festival (Muhr AsiaAfrica Feature)	14 December 2013	Best Film	Ilo Ilo	Won	
Dubai International Film Festival (Muhr AsiaAfrica Feature)	14 December 2013	Best Actress	Yeo Yann Yann	Won	
Asia Pacific Screen Awards	12 December 2013	Best Director	Anthony Chen	Won	
Asia-Pacific Film Festival	15 December 2013	Best Supporting Actress	Yeo Yann Yann	Won	
Asia-Pacific Film Festival	15 December 2013	Best Actress	Angeli Bayani	Nominated	
Asia-Pacific Film Festival	15 December 2013	Best Picture	Ilo Ilo	Nominated	
Asia-Pacific Film Festival	15 December 2013	Best Screenplay	Ilo Ilo	Nominated	
CAAMFest	13 - 23 March 2026	Remy Martin Filmmaker Award	Anthony Chen	Won	
Asian Film Awards	27 March 2014	Asian Film Award for Best Director	Anthony Chen	Nominated	
Asian Film Awards	27 March 2014	Asian Film Award for Best Supporting Actress	Yeo Yann Yann	Won	
Beijing International Film Festival	23 April 2014	Tiantin Award	Ilo Ilo	Nominated	
Chinese Film Media Awards	11 October 2014	Best Screenplay	Anthony Chen	Won	
Chinese Film Media Awards	11 October 2014	Best Supporting Actress	Yeo Yann Yann	Won	
Chlotrudis Awards	22 March 2015	Buried Treasure	Ilo Ilo	Nominated	

== See also ==
- List of submissions to the 86th Academy Awards for Best Foreign Language Film
- List of Singaporean submissions for the Academy Award for Best Foreign Language Film
