= Koh Jia Ler =

Singaporean actor

- 许家乐
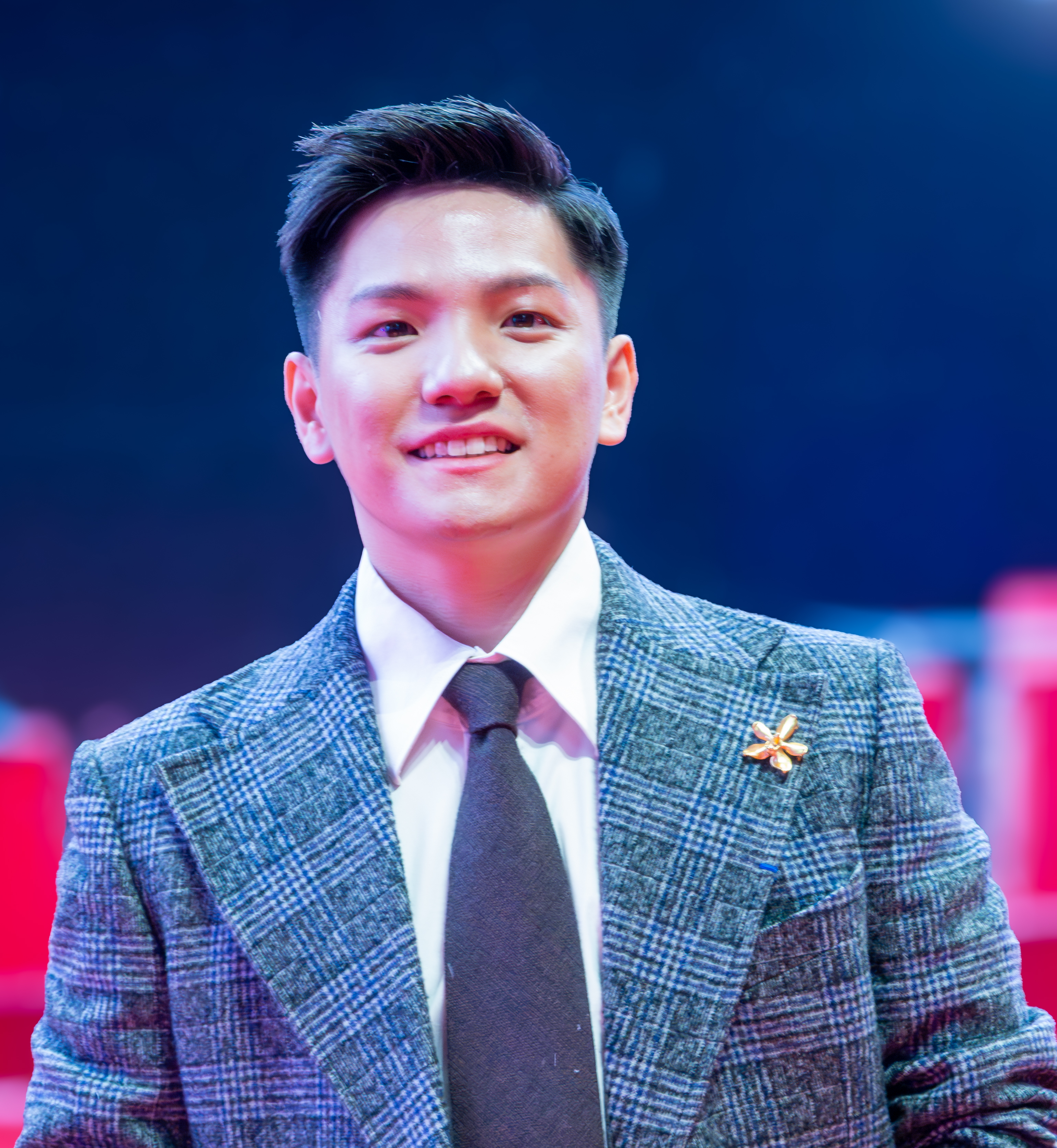
- Koh in 2026
- Born: November 11, 2000 (age 25); Singapore
- Occupation: Actor
- Years active: 2013–present

Koh Jia Ler (Chinese: 许家乐; born 11 November 2000) is a Singaporean actor who is best known for starring in the Anthony Chen films Ilo Ilo, Wet Season and We Are All Strangers.

== Career ==
Koh starred in the 2013 drama film Ilo Ilo. For his performance in the film, he was nominated for the Golden Horse Award for Best New Performer. He had a supporting role in Life - Fear Not. He starred in the 2019 drama film Wet Season. For his performance in the film, he was nominated for the Golden Horse Award for Best Supporting Actor. He starred in We Are All Strangers, the final installment of Anthony Chen's Growing Up trilogy.

== Filmography ==
=== Film ===
Year	Title	Role	Notes
2013	Ilo Ilo	Lim Jiale	Nominated Golden Horse Award for Best New Performer
2019	Wet Season	Wei Lun Kok	Nominated Golden Horse Award for Best Supporting Actor
2026	We Are All Strangers	Junyang	

=== Television ===
Year	Title	Role	Notes
2015–2016	Life - Fear Not	Wang Huaipo	Supporting role
