= Lucky Plaza =

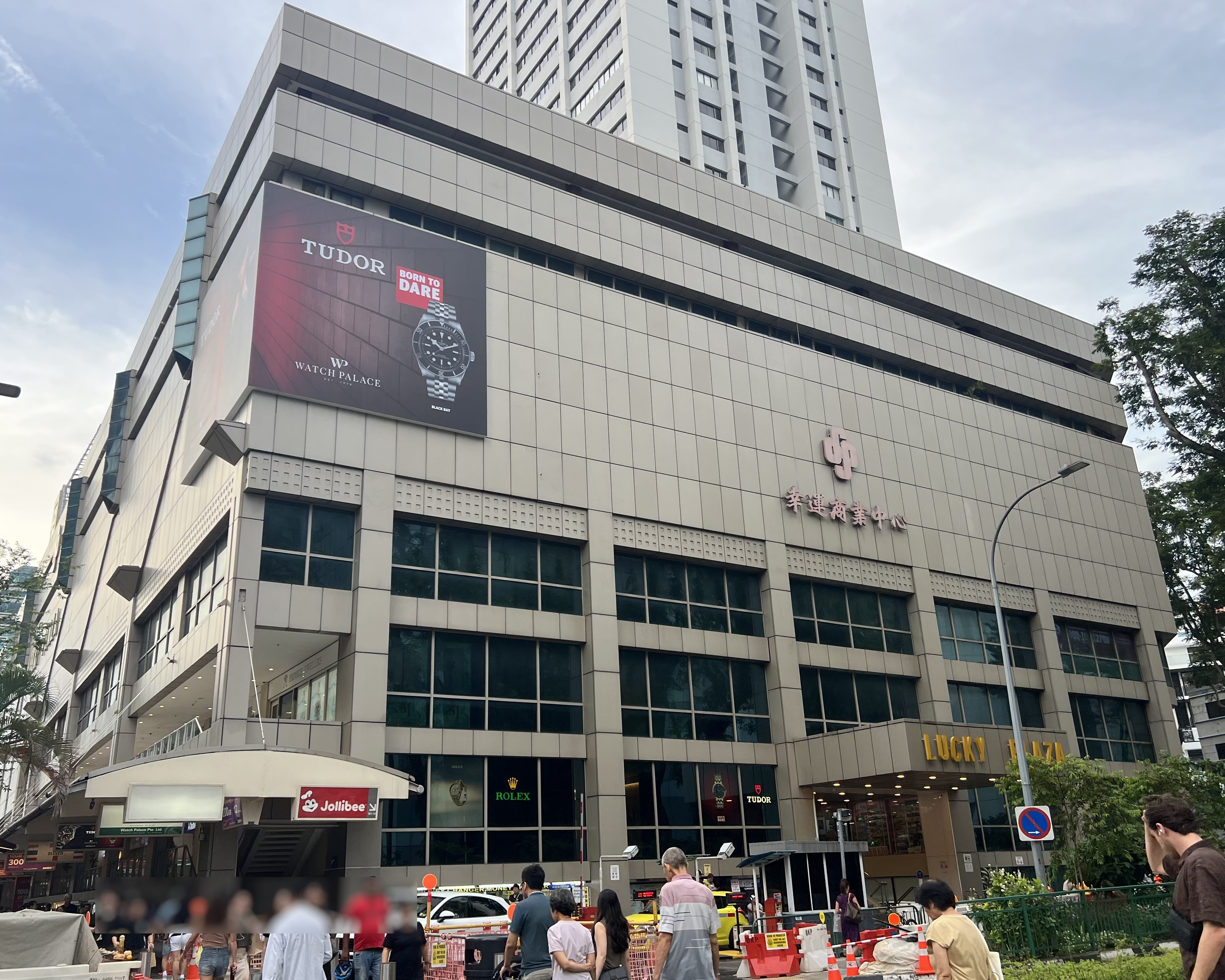
- Location: Orchard, Singapore
- Coordinates: 1°18′16.11″N 103°50′01.88″E
- Address: 304 Orchard Road, Singapore 238863
- Opened: 1977; 49 years ago (Podium), 1981; 45 years ago (Apartment)
- Developer: Far East Organization, Ng Teng Fong
- Website: luckyplaza.com.sg

Lucky Plaza is a shopping centre located in Orchard in Singapore. Built by developer Far East Organization, Lucky Plaza was completed in 1981 and has proven to be one of the most successful shopping centres in Singapore.

== History ==
Before Lucky Plaza was built in 1977, Champion Motors stood at 304 Orchard Road. The move-in of Champion Motors transformed Orchard Road into Singapore's ‘Motor Row’, displaying branded automobiles along the streets, and introducing the first-ever Volkswagen into Singapore. This form of brandishing signified the growing wealth in Singapore after the Second World War.

The 1960s heralded the explosive growth of the mass commercial aviation, facilitating the in-flow of tourists across the world. This helped the State to identify the tourist market as having a massive growth potential – boost income, job and trade opportunities, and in 1963, the former Minister for Culture S. Rajaratnam, announced plans to develop tourism as a major industry in Singapore. Thus, the newly formed STPB was appointed to carry out this massive plan. However, the private sector faced the challenge of limited resources to promote Singapore abroad as a tourist destination. This led to the State's effort to increase its funding for the development of the tourism industry in Singapore. One of the first places to be developed was the area of Orchard Road, where many hotels were erected. Therefore, beginning in the 1960s, Orchard Road began to undergo massive transformation, and the area was zoned for retail. By the early 1970s, Orchard Road had already attained its status as the 'IN' shopping area and gained an international recognition as a shopping paradise in Singapore.

Following the developments along Orchard Road, however, property values within this prime area began to grow, and motor traders were 'forced' to 'evacuate'. By the late 1970s, many brands, including Volkswagen, shifted to Leng Kee Road and Alexandra Road, transforming the area into Singapore's new ‘Motor Road’.

The ‘exodus’ of the motor traders brought in the land developers. During the 60s and 70s, North Bridge Road and High Street were known as the prime dining and shopping areas in Singapore, accommodating many well-known retail stalwarts, e.g. Metro, Takral and Majeed Textiles. On the other hand, at that time, Orchard Road was 'a leafy street lined with double-story shophouses'. Mr. Ng Teng Fong, the founder of Far East Organization, foresaw the shifting taste for better shopping and dining choice and envisioned the need for a 'vibrant main shopping street' in Singapore. Thus, Far East Organization became the first to venture into the development of Orchard Road, starting off with Far East Shopping Centre in 1974, followed by Lucky Plaza in 1977.

In 1978, many expected the 736 strata units and 30-storey commercial cum residential building (Lucky Plaza) to become a 'white elephant', despite that it was then one of the most expensive and largest development undertaken by a private developer. Little did they expect that Lucky Plaza would turn into a huge success in 1978, drawing in waves of eager shoppers, mostly wealthy local shoppers who lived in Tanglin and Cairnhill areas, and Malaysians and Indonesians. Lucky Plaza, designed by BEP Akitek Pte Ltd, pioneered the concept of a modern shopping mall – e.g. open vertical 'bazaar' as; the first multi-storey, fully air-conditioned shopping centre in the world; first golden bubble lift in South East Asia; well-designed positions of voids, foyers and concourses throughout the Plaza; wide corridors along shopping arcade; wide glass panels on both fronts of the shop for attractive display of goods. Such features won Lucky Plaza a mention in the National Geographic magazine. Furthermore, in the early years of its launch, small-scale businesses and individual shops selling luxury products such as jewellery, antiques, handicrafts and branded watches occupied the storefronts of Lucky Plaza.

On 12 March 2013, fast-food chain Jollibee opened its first branch in Singapore on the 6th floor of Lucky Plaza. However the 6th floor store was shut down on 30 November 2023, due to their opening of 10 more stores across Singapore. However, on 22 July 2024, Jollibee reopened their store in Lucky Plaza on B1 to replace McDonald's.

Back in 2014, there was an oversupply of retail spaces in Singapore. These retail spaces were closer to neighbourhoods and away from the city area. The convenience of these suburban malls caused consumers to stay within their region to shop causing Orchard Road to suffer. In addition, newer malls within the City area have also affected the Lucky Plaza businesses.

Tenants in Lucky Plaza also suffered heavy losses from the heavy rain in 2015. The heavy rain resulted in leakages in the ceilings and damaging the property of the unitholders.

== Incident ==
On 29 December 2019, six Filipinos were struck by a car that sped out of control outside Lucky Plaza's apartment block, with two of the women killed instantly, injuring four other women. The 64-year-old driver was arrested for reckless driving causing death.

== Architecture ==
BEP Akitek Pte Ltd. developed the concept of an open vertical 'bazaar' as to its central position in the middle of the Orchard Road tourist district.

The prime location prompted the idea of placing the traditional arcade 'on end' in the form of a series of stacked galleries, interconnected by escalators and glass lifts, around a high open space. These internal pedestrian streets are linked to that outside and a multi-storey carpark at the rear.

== Amenities ==
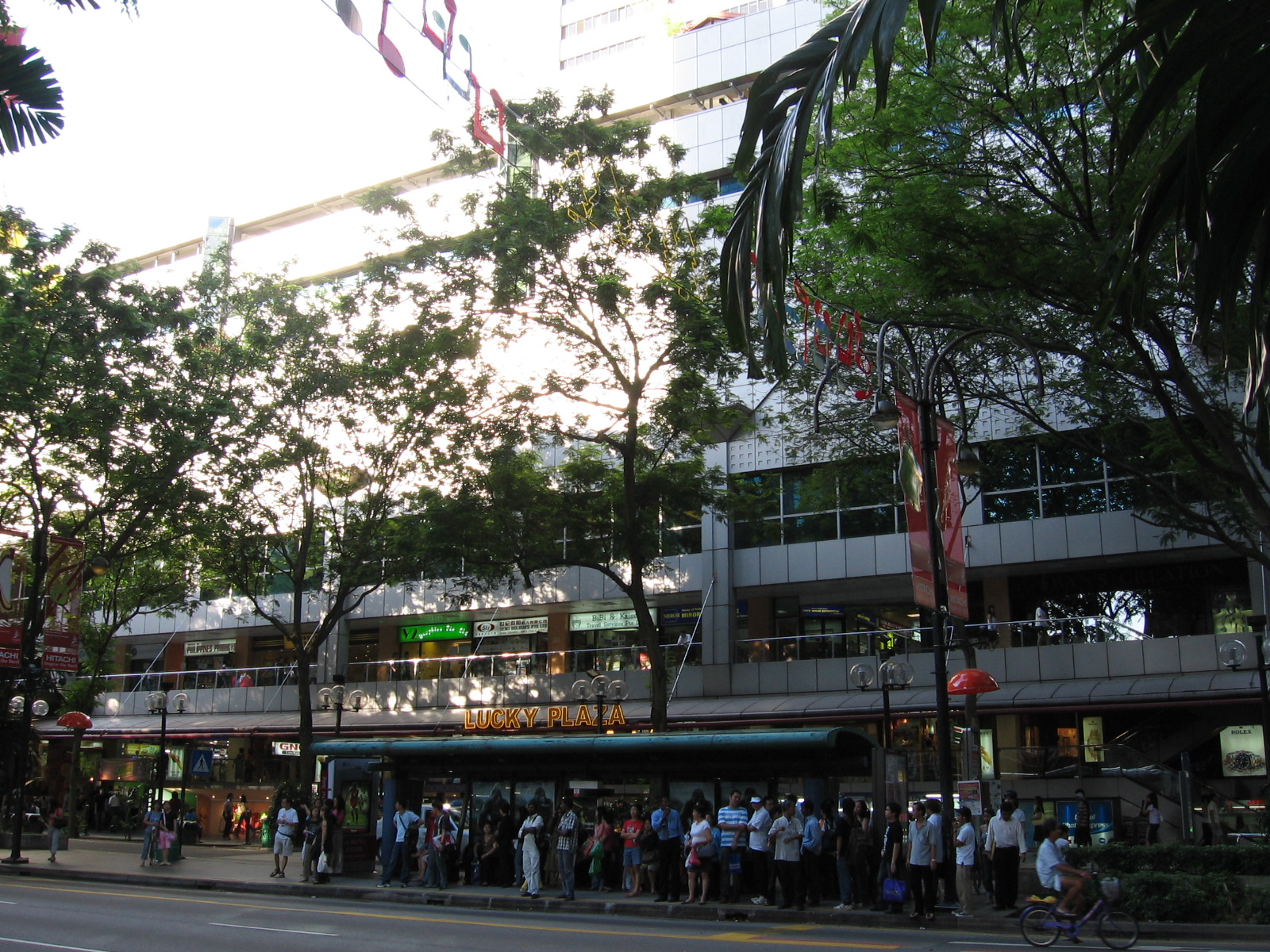
The bus stop along Orchard Road near the main entrance to Lucky Plaza.

Lucky Plaza has a range of shops selling perfume, Indonesians products, Filipino products, cosmetics, bags, shoes, sports goods and electronics. There is a food court in the basement that sells local fare.
