= Alexander Maksik =

American novelist

- Born: 1973 (age 52–53); Los Angeles
- Occupation: Novelist
- Writing career
- Years active: 2011–present
- Website: www.alexandermaksik.com

Alexander Maksik is an American novelist. He is the author of The Long Corner (2022) and You Deserve Nothing (2011).

== History ==
Maksik was born in Los Angeles in 1973. He eventually moved to Paris, France, where he taught at the American School of Paris.

== Awards ==
- Pushcart Prize (2015)
- Andrew Lytle Prize (2017)
- Guggenheim Fellowship (2017)

== Bibliography ==
- You Deserve Nothing (2011)
- A Marker to Measure Drift (2013)
- Shelter in Place (2016)
- The Long Corner (2022)
- Passengers: A Novel (2026)
