= A Land Imagined =

2018 Singaporean film

- Directed by: Yeo Siew Hua
- Written by: Yeo Siew Hua
- Produced by: Fran Borgia
- Starring: Peter Yu; Luna Kwok; Liu Xiaoyi; Jack Tan; Ishtiaque Zico
- Cinematography: Hideho Urata
- Edited by: Daniel Hui
- Music by: Teo Wei Yong
- Production companies: Akanga Film Asia; Films de Force Majeure mm2 Entertainment; Volya Films
- Distributed by: mm2 Entertainment (Singapore)
- Release dates: 7 August 2018 (Locarno); 8 December 2018 (SGIFF); 21 February 2019 (Singapore)
- Running time: 95 minutes
- Countries: Singapore; France; Netherlands
- Languages: Mandarin; English; Bengali

A Land Imagined (Chinese: 幻土) is a 2018 neo-noir mystery thriller film written and directed by Yeo Siew Hua. A Singapore-France-Netherlands co-production, the film tells the story of a police investigator who uncovers the truth behind the disappearance of a construction worker.

The film premiered in competition on 7 August 2018, at the 71st Locarno Film Festival, and won the top prize of the festival, the Golden Leopard. At Locarno, Yeo also won the Junior Jury award and a Special Mention award. In December 2018, A Land Imagined played in competition at the 29th Singapore International Film Festival, where it was named Best Asian Feature Film by a jury led by Hong Kong director Stanley Kwan. It is the first time a Singaporean film has won the award. The film was released in Singapore theatres on 21 February 2019. It was selected as the Singaporean entry for the Best International Feature Film at the 92nd Academy Awards, but it was not nominated.

== Plot ==
The film revolves around Lok, a police officer who is investigating the disappearance of a Chinese migrant worker working at a land reclamation site. The investigation leads him to the disappearance of another Bengali worker, who was on good terms with the missing worker. As he retraces the steps of the missing worker, Lok gets a sensing of the plight of these workers as they work for an unscrupulous employer.

== Cast ==
- Peter Yu as Lok
- Luna Kwok as Mindy
- Liu Xiaoyi as Wang
- Jack Tan as Jason
- Ishtiaque Zico as Ajit

== Reception ==
On review aggregator Rotten Tomatoes, the film holds an approval rating of 75%, based on 16 reviews. On Metacritic, the film has a weighted average score of 59 out of 100, based on 7 critics, indicating "mixed or average reviews".

== Awards and nominations ==
Festival	Date of ceremony	Award & Category	Recipient(s)	Result	Ref(s)
56th Golden Horse Awards	23 November 2019	Best Original Score	Teo Wei Yong	Won	
56th Golden Horse Awards	23 November 2019	Best Original Screenplay	Yeo Siew Hua	Won	
13th Asian Film Awards	17 March 2019	Best New Director	Yeo Siew Hua	Nominated	
12th Asia Pacific Screen Awards	29 November 2018	Achievement in Cinematography	Hideho Urata	Won	
12th Asia Pacific Screen Awards	29 November 2018	Young Cinema Award	Yeo Siew Hua	Won	
2nd El Gouna Film Festival	28 September 2018	El Gouna Gold Star - Feature Narrative Competition	A Land Imagined	Won	
12th Five Flavours Asian Film Festival	21 November 2018	Best Film - New Asian Cinema Competition	A Land Imagined	Nominated	
26th Filmfest Hamburg	5 October 2018	NDR Young Talent Award	Yeo Siew Hua	Nominated	
55th Golden Horse Film Festival	17 November 2018	NETPAC Award for Best Asian Film	A Land Imagined	Nominated	
43rd Hong Kong International Film Festival	1 April 2019	Firebird Award - Young Cinema Competition (Chinese Language)	A Land Imagined	Nominated	
71st Locarno International Film Festival	11 August 2018	Golden Leopard - International Competition	A Land Imagined	Won	
71st Locarno International Film Festival	11 August 2018	Junior Jury Award - International Competition	A Land Imagined	Won	
71st Locarno International Film Festival	11 August 2018	Prize of the Ecumenical Jury - Special Mention	A Land Imagined	Won	
71st Locarno International Film Festival	11 August 2018	Best Actress - Boccalino d’Oro Award	Luna Kwok	Won	
3rd London East Asia Film Festival	4 November 2018	Special Jury Mention	A Land Imagined	Won	
2nd Nepal International Film Festival	27 February 2019	Best International Feature Film, Gautam Buddha Award	A Land Imagined	Won	
2nd Pingyao International Film Festival	17 October 2018	Jury Prize - Roberto Rossellini Awards	A Land Imagined	Won	
6th QCinema International Film Festival	30 October 2018	Pylon Best Picture - Asian Next Wave Competition	A Land Imagined	Won	
48th International Film Festival Rotterdam	2 February 2019	Special Mention - Youth Jury Award	A Land Imagined	Won	
29th Singapore International Film Festival	8 December 2018	Best Film - Asian Feature Film Competition	A Land Imagined	Won	
29th Singapore International Film Festival	8 December 2018	Lesley Ho Asian Film Talent Award	Yeo Siew Hua	Won	
29th Singapore International Film Festival	8 December 2018	Swarovski Inspiring Woman in Film Award	Luna Kwok	Won	
63rd Valladolid International Film Festival	27 October 2018	Best Director of Photography	Hideho Urata	Won	
63rd Valladolid International Film Festival	27 October 2018	Golden Spike Award for Best Film	A Land Imagined	Nominated	

== See also ==
- List of submissions to the 92nd Academy Awards for Best International Feature Film
- List of Singaporean submissions for the Academy Award for Best International Feature Film
