= Ritual opera =

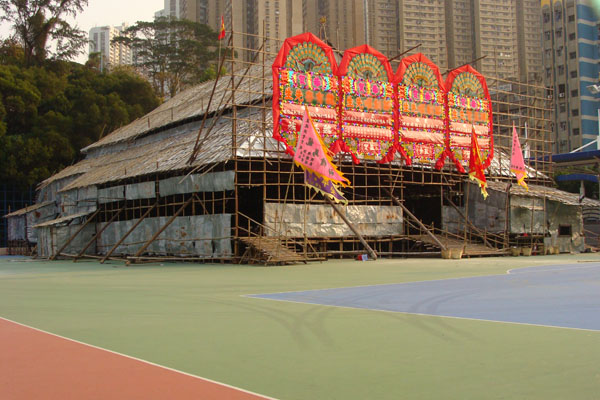
Shen Gong Xi's playhouse

Ritual opera, also called Opera with divine powers (Chinese: 酬神戲) is a form of Chinese opera played at religious ceremonies including a god’s birthday, temple openings, at miaohui, Ghost Festival, Daijiao, and other traditional celebrations. It is performed to welcome the gods and is one of a series of celebrations held to thank and reward them for their blessings. In Guangdong and Hong Kong, it is mostly called San Gung Hei (神功戲 in Cantonese) or Shen Gong Xi (in Mandarin), and in China, in the north, it is mostly called Village Opera (社戏) or She Xi (the word "She" in the word "She Xi" refers to the place where the Sheshen was worshiped in the old days, and there is another saying that the word "She" was a small unit in the ancient region, and the drama was performed in the She, which was called She drama） (Note: The word “She” 社 originally meant soil god. It transitioned to meaning soil metaphorically as in Sheji or as a morpheme to mean social. It can refer to administrative regions as in Vietnamese usage See Sheshen for more info on the etymology). This type of opera is performed on the birthdays of various gods, such as Avalokiteśvara (觀音), Xuanwu, Guan Yu, Dragon King, Mazu, Shanshen, City God, and Tudigong.

In an opera with divine powers, the performers sacrifice extensively to a particular god. On stage, they will dress up as gods and goddesses and portray well-known Chinese mythological stories through song, dance, and acrobatics. The opera is usually performed in a collapsible tent next to the temple.

The genre is very big in Cantonese opera and several performances can be seen every year. The god of Cantonese opera is Huaguangdadi, who is worshiped by all Cantonese opera players.

== Categories ==
There are several types of performances, such as temple fair performances, festival performances, ancestral hall performances, festive performances, affairs performances, and peace plays. The most common is the Miaohui play, which is usually performed on the birthdays of deities such as the Jade Emperor, Three Great Emperor-Officials, Guan Di, Xuanwu, Lü Dongbin, Mazu, Dragon King, City God, Mountain God, Land God. The worship of these gods is usually a major event for the local temples, and at the same time, the local temples also hold Temple Festival to celebrate during the festival.

The performance is mainly for the purpose of entertaining the gods or thanking them, and is only performed incidentally for the appreciation of the good faith. Therefore, the stage is often set up at the front of the temple, and the audience is not allowed to go forward or get too close, but can only watch the show from the sides or the back, so that the gods can be said to be sitting in the VIP seats or the seats in the front rows.

In Hong Kong, most of the performances are Cantonese opera, Teochew opera, and Liyuan opera. In Taiwan, in the early days, it was Beiguan music, Gaojia opera, Taiwanese opera, and Glove puppetry, but after the restoration, it was mostly Taiwanese opera and Glove puppetry, and even Puppetry and modern Drama are available, and in recent decades, Film has also been shown to honor the gods. In mainland China, the performance of Shinto plays is based on the region's popular theater genres. In Southeast Asia, most of the Chinese operas are Taiwanese Ke-Tse opera（Hokkien opera）, Teochew opera, and Cantonese opera.

In Singapore, these operas typically open with a deity-impersonation plays (扮仙戏; Ban‑sian‑xi). Ban‑sian‑xi is an indispensable ritual short drama within Singapore’s Chinese deity‑offering opera. It is typically performed before the commencement of the main plays (正戲). Ban sian xi serves simultaneously as an act of worship and as a performative offering to the gods, forming the ritual foundation upon which all later ceremonies proceed.

== Development ==
During the Northern Song dynasty, temple plays were widely held in the lower reaches of the Yangtze River as "puppet plays", and when they were staged, the audience was "full of laughter and talk, and the villagers gathered to watch and drink wine, and were drunk and beaten". The custom of She drama has been passed down for many years, and the celebration of She drama is very rich, as seen in "The Day of the She", written by the Tang dynasty poet Wang Kai, and "Spring She (and)", written by the Song dynasty poet Lu You.

The famous literary figure Lu Xun wrote a novel "The She Opera". Nowadays, it is also common to see Shen Gong opera in Hong Kong's Tai Ping Qing Jiao and Hong Kong Yu Lan Festival, where local people raise funds to hire a troupe to perform Chinese opera as the main celebration, and many rituals in Taiwan also have opera performances.
