= Anthony Chen =

Singaporean film director (born 1984)

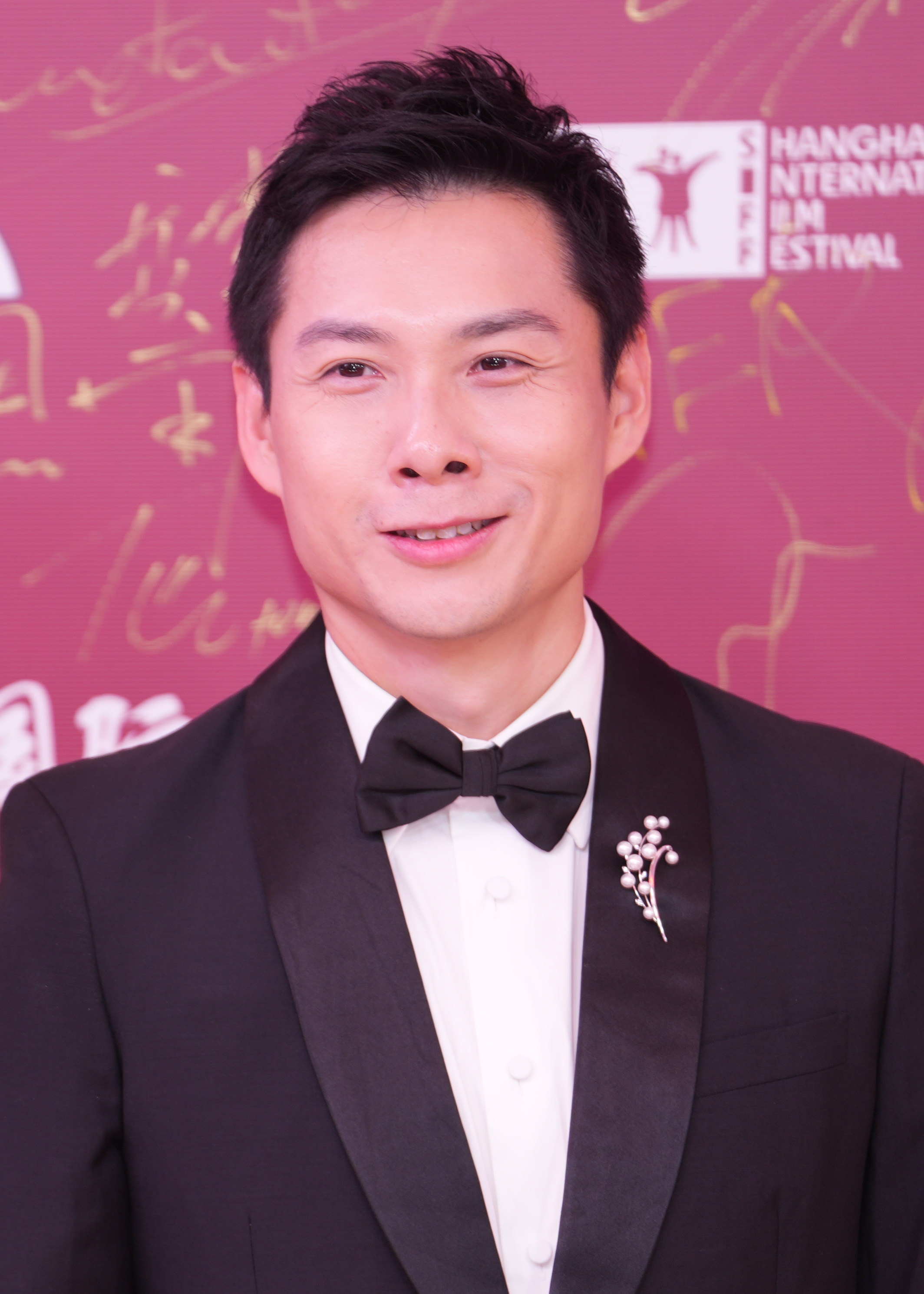
- Chen in 2026
- Born: 18 April 1984 (age 42); Singapore
- Other name: Chen Zheyi
- Education: National Film and Television School
- Occupations: Film director; screenwriter; film producer
- Years active: 2005—present
- Spouse: Rachel Yan (m. 2009)
- Children: 1

Chinese name
- Traditional Chinese: 陳哲藝
- Simplified Chinese: 陈哲艺
- Hanyu Pinyin: Chén Zhéyì

Anthony Chen (born 18 April 1984) is a Singaporean film director, screenwriter and film producer. He is known for directing the feature films Ilo Ilo (2013) and Wet Season (2019).

His debut feature film, Ilo Ilo, won the Camera d'Or at the 2013 Cannes Film Festival, making him the first Singaporean to be awarded at Cannes Film Festival. The film also earned him Achievement in Directing at the 7th Asia Pacific Screen Awards, as well as Best Narrative Feature, Best New Director and Best Original Screenplay at the 50th Golden Horse Awards.

In June 2023, Chen was invited to join the Directors Branch of the Academy of Motion Picture Arts and Sciences.

== Early life ==
Chen was born 18 April 1984, to Bernard and Joan Tai. Interested in film from a young age, Chen attended Nan Hua Primary School and The Chinese High School. He then attended the School of Film and Media Studies at Ngee Ann Polytechnic. His graduating film from Ngee Ann Polytechnic, G-23 (2005), was screened in various international film festivals and won awards in France, Korea and Belgium.

== Career ==
=== Short films ===
In 2007 and 2008, Chen went on to direct Ah Ma and Haze respectively. Both attracted favourable criticism. Ah Ma was awarded a Special Mention in the short film competition at the prestigious Cannes Film Festival, making it the first Singaporean film to win an award at the festival.

Following his mandatory conscription in the army, Chen was admitted to the National Film and Television School (NFTS) in the United Kingdom. Graduating in 2010, two of his short films, Distance and Lighthouse, were released that year. These were followed up with Karang Guni (2012) and Homesick (2013). The Break Away (2021) is Chen's short film contribution to the anthology The Year Of The Everlasting Storm, selected at the 2021 Cannes Film Festival.

=== Feature films ===
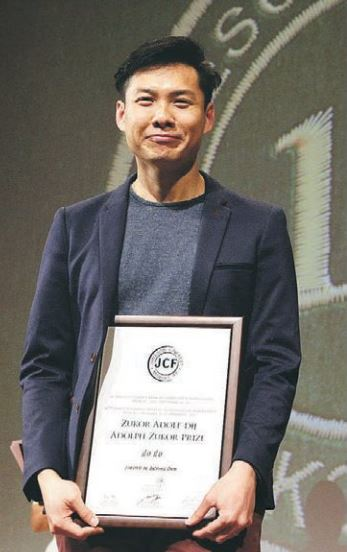
Chen in 2013

Ilo Ilo, Chen's first feature film, was released on 29 August 2013 in Singapore theatres. Chen served as director, producer, and writer. According to Chen, the film was inspired by a real life maid who worked for Chen's family when he was a child. After its world debut at the 2013 Cannes Film Festival, Ilo Ilo received a 15-minute long "standing ovation" and earned Chen the coveted Camera d'Or. Singapore Prime Minister Lee Hsien Loong noted Chen's achievement, and congratulated him and the film's cast on Facebook.

On 19 October 2013, Ilo Ilo went on to win the Sutherland Trophy for Best First Feature at the 57th BFI London Film Festival. (The same night, one of Chen's tutors at NFTS, Paweł Pawlikowski, won the Best Film Award for Ida).

With Ilo Ilo, Anthony Chen also made history by becoming the first Singaporean to win Best Narrative Feature and Best Original Screenplay at the 50th Golden Horse Awards, while Yeo Yann Yann won Best Supporting Actress for her role in the film. For Ilo Ilo, Chen was named as one of Variety magazine's annual "10 Directors to Watch".

In 2015, Chen's Distance, an "omnibus film" for which Chen served as executive producer and writer, opened the Golden Horse Film Festival in Taiwan. Distance consists of segments by the three directors Xin Yukun, Tan Shijie and Sivaroj Kongsakul, from China, Singapore and Thailand respectively.

In spring 2018, Chen began production on his second feature film, Wet Season, which reunites him with Ilo Ilo stars Yeo Yann Yann and Koh Jia Ler. The film premiered at the 2019 Toronto International Film Festival and went on to be nominated for six Golden Horse Awards, with Yeo winning her second Golden Horse, for Best Leading Actress.

In February 2022, Chen completed his first Chinese feature film, The Breaking Ice. The film was written and directed by Chen, and stars Zhou Dongyu, Liu Haoran, and Qu Chuxiao. According to Variety, this film follows the blossoming relationship among three young adults in their twenties, set over a short few days in the winter snow. The film premiered at the 2023 Cannes Film Festival in the Un Certain Regard section.

In March 2022, Chen is set to direct Secret Daughter starring Priyanka Chopra Jonas and Sienna Miller.

Chen's first English-language feature, Drift, premiered at the 2023 Sundance Film Festival. It was shot in Greece and stars Cynthia Erivo and Alia Shawkat.

In February 2026, Chen's fifth feature film, We Are All Strangers, had its world premiere in the main competition of the 76th Berlin International Film Festival.

== Personal life ==
Chen married Rachel Yan, whom he met in London in 2007. Their son was born in August 2018.

Chen and his family have been based in Hong Kong since August 2022.

In September 2025, Chen signed an open pledge with Film Workers for Palestine pledging not to work with Israeli film institutions "that are implicated in genocide and apartheid against the Palestinian people."

=== Favourite films ===
In 2022, Chen participated in the Sight & Sound film poll, which every ten years asks contemporary directors to select the ten greatest films of all time.

Chen's selections were:

- A Brighter Summer Day (1991)
- The 400 Blows (1959)
- Tokyo Story (1953)
- Citizen Kane (1941)
- Mirror (1975)
- Close-up (1989)
- Kes (1969)
- In the Mood for Love (2000)
- Pather Panchali (1955)
- Burning (2018)

== Filmography ==
=== Feature films ===
Year	English Title	Notes	Ref.
2013	Ilo Ilo	Caméra d'Or at the 2013 Cannes Film Festival; Golden Horse Award for Best Narrative Feature	
2019	Wet Season	Nominated for the Platform Prize	
2023	Drift		
2023	The Breaking Ice		
2026	We Are All Strangers	Nominated for the Golden Bear	
TBA	Secret Daughter		
TBA	Sunset Park		

=== Short films ===
Year	Title	Notes	Ref.
2005	G-23	Won the Brussels International Film Festival Emile Cantilon Award	
2007	Ah Ma	Nominated for the Short Film Palme d'Or	
2008	Haze	Nominated for the Short Film Golden Bear	
2009	Hotel 66		
2010	Lighthouse		
2011	The Reunion Dinner		
2012	Karang Guni		
2021	The Break Away	Part of anthology The Year of the Everlasting Storm	
2023	The Cigarette	Part of anthology 2×25 for Film Fest Ghent's 50th anniversary	

=== Only producer ===
Year	Title	Notes	Ref.
2010	Distance	Anthology; executive producer and co-writer	
2017	Pop Aye	Executive producer	
2022	Arnold is a Model Student		
2022	Ajoomma		
2024	Crocodile Tears		
2024	Some Nights I Feel Like Walking		
2025	This City Is a Battlefield		
2026	Sleep No More		
2026	Four Seasons in Java		
