= Lo Che-ying =

Chinese animator

Lo Che-ying, Neco (Chinese: 盧子英, born 1960) is an independent animator in Hong Kong. Obsessed with comics and cartoons since his childhood, he was influenced by various styles animations from around the world. Lo's fascination with Japanese animation and Disney productions sparked his journey into the world of animation. Inspired by the works of Hayao Miyazaki, Neco embarked on a path to create his own animated works. He joined the Art Services Section of the TV section of RTHK towards the end of 1978 and founded Animation Workshop and Single Frame in 1980 and 1982 respectively. Since the 1980s, he has also been engaged in animation criticism, animation research, serving as a jury panelist of ifva animation, and teaching animation at university. His published works include A Selective Collection of Hong Kong Movie Posters, Frame after frame, My quest for A and C, Chinese Animation and Hong Kong Animation Newcomers.

== Early life ==
Lo was born in 1960 and grew up in Tai Po.

== Work and experience ==
Lo started his professional animation career at RTHK where he spent 17 years. He started making independent animation in 1977 and completed over 20 animations, including award-winning works and unpublished works. Additionally, he won the Best Animation Awards in the Independent Short film Festival (HKISFF) for animations such as Blue Moon, Night of a Sleep Writer, The Man who Shot Snapping Turtles, as well as City of suicide. He also experimented with a wide variety of media and techniques in his creative expression, including clay, salt and sand.

== Individual Works ==
| Year | Title |
|---|---|
| 1978 | Monster Land I |
| 1978 | Monster Land II |
| 1978 | Lonely Ship |
| 1978 | Dreamland Express |
| 1979 | Blue Moon |
| 1980 | Night of a Sleepy Writer |
| 1980 | Eleanor Rigby |
| 1981 | The Men Who Shot Snapping Turtles |
| 1982 | Robots |
| 1982 | Senpei's Summer |
| 1984 | The Ring |
| 1989 | The Forbidden Game |

== Collaborative Works ==
| Year | Title |
|---|---|
| 1978 | Brother Grasshopper |
| 1980 | A Day with Hon Chai |
| 1980 | Flip Film I |
| 1982 | Flip Film II |
| 1985 | Shiritori Anime |
| 1991 | City of Suicide |
| 2005 | i-City |

== Exhibitions / Screening ==
1. "Animation by Neco Lo", one of the screening programs of the exhibition "Frame after Frame", held at the Hong Kong Film Archive on 15 July and 4 August 2006.
2. "60 Years of Hong Kong Animation", exhibition curated by Neco Lo and was held from 19 to 22 March 2012 at Hong Kong Convention & Exhibition Centre.
3. "50 Years of Hong Kong and Taiwanese Animation", exhibition curated by Neco Lo and organized by the Hong Kong Arts Centre from 13 February to 26 February 2015.
