= 2025 Bangkok International Film Festival =

Edition of film festival

- Opening film: Death Whisperer 3 by Narit Yuvaboon
- Closing film: Kokuho by Lee Sang-il
- Location: Bangkok, Thailand
- Festival date: 27 September–15 October 2025
- Website: bkkiff.co

The 2025 Bangkok International Film Festival took place from 27 September to 15 October 2025 in Bangkok, Thailand. The festival marked its first edition since 2009 and had originally been scheduled for January 2026. It opened with supernatural horror film Death Whisperer 3 by Narit Yuvaboon. It closed with historical drama film Kokuho by Lee Sang-il.

== Juries ==
=== Main Competition ===
- Vimukthi Jayasundara, Sri Lankan filmmaker
- Ming-Jung Kuo, Taiwanese film curator and programmer
- Anocha Suwichakornpong, Thai filmmaker
- Kiki Fung, Hong Kong film programmer
- Kongdej Jaturanrasamee, Thai screenwriter

=== New Voices ===
- Tony Bui, American film director
- Kamila Andini, Indonesian film director
- Soros Sukhum, Thai film producer

=== Asian Short Films Competition ===
- Woo Ming Jin, Malaysian film director
- Mattie Do, Laotian film director
- Sompot Chidgasornpongse, Thai film director

== Official selection ==
=== Opening and closing films ===
| English title | Original title | Director(s) | Production countrie(s) |
|---|---|---|---|
| Death Whisperer 3 (opening film) | ธี่หยด 3 | Narit Yuvaboon | Thailand |
| Kokuho (closing film) | 国宝 | Lee Sang-il | Japan |

=== Main Competition ===
| English title | Original title | Director(s) | Production countrie(s) |
|---|---|---|---|
| A Poet | Un poeta | Simón Mesa Soto | Colombia, Germany, Sweden |
| Agon | | Giulio Bertelli | Italy, France, United States |
| Amoeba | | Tan Siyou | Singapore, Netherlands, France, Spain, South Korea |
| The Chronology of Water | | Kristen Stewart | France, Latvia, United Kingdom, United States |
| Dry Leaf | ხმელი ფოთოლი | Alexandre Koberidze | Georgia, Germany |
| Homebound | | Neeraj Ghaywan | India |
| I Only Rest in the Storm | O Riso e a Faca | Pedro Pinho | Portugal, Brazil, France, Romania |
| Julian | | Cato Kusters | Belgium, Netherlands |
| Last Night I Conquered the City of Thebes | Anoche conquisté Tebas | Gabriel Azorín | Spain, Portugal |
| Lost Land | Harà Watan | Akio Fujimoto | Japan, France, Malaysia, Germany |
| Milk Teeth | Dinți de lapte | Mihai Mincan | Romania, France, Denmark, Greece, Bulgaria |
| The Mysterious Gaze of the Flamingo | La misteriosa mirada del flamenco | Diego Céspedes | Chile, France, Belgium, Spain, Germany |
| On the Road | En el camino | David Pablos | Mexico |
| The President's Cake | مملكة القصب | Hasan Hadi | Iraq, Qatar, United States |
| Promised Sky | Promis le ciel | Erige Sehiri | France, Tunisia, Qatar |
| Renoir | ルノワール | Chie Hayakawa | Japan, France, Singapore, Philippines, Indonesia |
| Sound of Falling | In die Sonne schauen | Mascha Schilinski | Germany |
| Strange River | Estrany riu | Jaume Claret Muxart | Spain, Germany |
| This City Is a Battlefield | Perang Kota | Mouly Surya | Indonesia, Singapore, Netherlands, France, Norway, Philippines, Cambodia |

=== New Voices ===
| English title | Original title | Director(s) | Production countrie(s) |
|---|---|---|---|
| Black Ox | 黒の牛 | Tetsuichiro Tsuta | Japan, Taiwan, United States |
| Diamonds in the Sand | 砂の中のダイヤモンド | Janus Victoria | Philippines, Japan, Malaysia |
| The Fin | 지느러미 | Park Sye-young | South Korea, Germany |
| Hair, Paper, Water... | Tóc, Giấy và Nước... | Nicolas Graux, Trương Minh Quý | Belgium, France, Vietnam |
| Sand City | বালুর নগরীতে | Mahde Hasan | Bangladesh |
| Secret of the Mountain Serpent | साँप, सपने, तुम और मैं | Nidhi Saxena | India, Italy, Sri Lanka |
| Skin of Youth | Ồn ào tuổi trẻ | Ash Mayfair | Vietnam, Singapore, Japan |
| Tiger's Pond | Vaghachipani | Natesh Hegde | India, Singapore |
| Where the Night Stands Still | Come la notte | Liryc Dela Cruz | Italy, Philippines |

=== Special Presentations ===
| English title | Original title | Director(s) | Production countrie(s) |
|---|---|---|---|
| The Fox King | | Woo Ming Jin | Malaysia, Indonesia |
| Ky Nam Inn | Quán Kỳ Nam | Leon Le | Vietnam |
| Love on Trial | 恋愛裁判 | Koji Fukada | Japan, France |
| A Pale View of Hills | 遠い山なみの光 | Kei Ishikawa | Japan, United Kingdom, Poland |
| The Souffleur | | Gastón Solnicki | Austria, Argentina |
| Yakushima's Illusion | L'Illusion de Yakushima | Naomi Kawase | Japan, France, Luxembourg, Belgium |

=== Thai Panorama ===
| English title | Original title | Director(s) | Production countrie(s) |
|---|---|---|---|
| 404 Run Run | 404 สุขีนิรันดร์..Run Run | Pichaya Jarusboonpracha | Thailand |
| A Useful Ghost | ผีใช้ได้ค่ะ | Ratchapoom Boonbunchachoke | Thailand, France, Singapore, Germany |
| Attack 13 | วิญญาณเลขที่ 13 | Taweewat Wantha | Thailand |
| DREAM! | ดรีม! | Paul Spurrier, Jiriya Spurrier | Thailand |
| Flames of a Flower | 火の華 | Oudai Kojima | Japan, Thailand |
| Flat Girls | แฟลตเกิร์ล ชั้นห่างระหว่าง เ ร า | Jirassaya Wongsutin | Thailand |
| Funeral Casino Blues | | Roderick Warich | Germany |
| Halabala | ฮาลาบาลา ป่าจิตหลุด | Eakasit Thairaat | Thailand |
| Home | Baan | Leonor Teles | Portugal |
| The Inexplicable Tale of the Girl in the Feather Jacket | | Ivo Wejgaard | Switzerland, Thailand |
| Kayaor Disrespecting Faith and the Supernatural | คายอ้อ ลบหลู่ ศรัทธา อาถรรพ์ | Pawat Panangkasiri | Thailand |
| Kiss of the Con Queen | | Tom Waller | Thailand, Ireland, Indonesia, United States, Japan |
| Panor | พนอ | Putipong Saisikaew | Thailand |
| The Red Envelope | ซองแดงแต่งผี | Chayanop Boonprakob | Thailand |
| The Stone | พระแท้ คนเก๊ | Arak Amornsupasiri, Vuthipong Sukhanindr | Thailand |
| Tha Rae: The Exorcist | ท่าแร่ | Taweewat Wantha | Thailand |
| Tomb Watcher | สุสานคนเป็น | Vathanyu Ingkawiwat | Thailand |

=== Asian Short Films Competition ===
| English title | Original title | Director(s) | Production countrie(s) |
|---|---|---|---|
| 12 Moments Before the Flag-Raising Ceremony | | Qu Zhizheng | China |
| A Metamorphosis | အသွင်ပြောင်းလဲခြင်းတစ်ခု | Lin Htet Aung | Myanmar |
| A Part of Us Exposed | เนื้อนัยน์ | Jeanne Penjan Lassus | Thailand |
| Across the River | | Shengjie He | China |
| Attock | | Awais Gohar | Pakistan |
| Before the Sea Forgets | | Ngọc Duy Lê | Singapore |
| Delay | 远方延误 | Hanxuan Wang | China, United States |
| Developed | 写真撮ってもいいですか | Yunhui Yang | Japan |
| EXIT | | Yong Chao Lee | Myanmar |
| Grandma Nai Who Played Favorites | ចៅសំណព្វចិត្ត | Chheangkea | Cambodia, France, United States |
| Honey, My Love, So Sweet | | JT Trinidad | Philippines |
| More Than Happy | | Tan Wei Keong | Singapore |
| Rains Don't Make Us Happy Anymore | | Yashasvi Juyal | India |
| The Slides of Prof. Somkiat Tang-Namo | | Prapat Jiwarangsan | Thailand |
| Through Your Eyes | | Nelson Yeo | Singapore |

=== Multicolor ===
| English title | Original title | Director(s) | Production countrie(s) |
|---|---|---|---|
| A Private Life | Vie privée | Rebecca Zlotowski | France |
| Afternoons of Solitude | Tardes de soledad | Albert Serra | Spain, Portugal, France |
| Alpha | | Julia Ducournau | France, Belgium |
| Becoming Human | ជាតិជាមនុស្សា | Polen Ly | Cambodia |
| Below the Clouds | Sotto le nuvole | Gianfranco Rosi | Italy |
| Blue Heron | | Sophy Romvari | Canada, Hungary |
| Calle Málaga | | Maryam Touzani | Morocco, France, Spain, Germany, Belgium |
| Caravan | Karavan | Zuzana Kirchnerová-Špidlová | Czech Republic, Slovakia, Italy |
| Case 137 | Dossier 137 | Dominik Moll | France |
| The Currents | Las corrientes | Milagros Mumenthaler | Switzerland, Argentina |
| Director's Diary | Записная книжка режиссёра | Aleksandr Sokurov | Russia, Italy |
| DJ Ahmet | Диџеј Ахмет | Georgi M. Unkovski | North Macedonia, Czech Republic, Serbia, Croatia |
| Dracula | | Radu Jude | Romania, Austria, Luxembourg, Brazil |
| Dreams (Sex Love) | Drømmer | Dag Johan Haugerud | Norway |
| Drunken Noodles | | Lucio Castro | United States, Argentina |
| Duse | | Pietro Marcello | Italy, France |
| Eleanor the Great | | Scarlett Johansson | United States |
| Enzo | | Robin Campillo | France |
| Franz | | Agnieszka Holland | Czech Republic, Poland, Germany, France, Turkey |
| Girls on Wire | 想飞的女孩 | Vivian Qu | China |
| God Will Not Help | Bog Neće Pomoći | Hana Jušić | Croatia, Italy, Romania, Greece, France, Slovenia |
| The Good Sister | Schwesterherz | Sarah Miro Fischer | Germany, Spain |
| Kontinental '25 | | Radu Jude | Romania, Brazil, Switzerland, United Kingdom, Luxembourg |
| Laguna | | Šarūnas Bartas | Lithuania, France |
| The Little Sister | La Petite Dernière | Hafsia Herzi | France, Germany |
| Love | Kjærlighet | Dag Johan Haugerud | Norway |
| The Love That Remains | Ástin Sem Eftir Er | Hlynur Pálmason | Iceland, Denmark, France, Finland, Sweden |
| Magellan | Magalhães | Lav Diaz | Portugal, Spain, Philippines, France, Taiwan |
| The Mastermind | | Kelly Reichardt | United Kingdom, United States |
| Miroirs No. 3 | | Christian Petzold | Germany |
| My Father's Shadow | | Akinola Davies Jr. | United Kingdom, Nigeria |
| My Favourite Cake | کیک محبوب من | Maryam Moghaddam, Behtash Sanaeeha | Iran, France, Sweden, Germany |
| No Other Choice | 어쩔수가없다 | Park Chan-wook | South Korea |
| Orphan | Árva | László Nemes | Hungary, France, Germany, United Kingdom |
| Resurrection | 狂野时代 | Bi Gan | China, France |
| Romería | | Carla Simón | Spain, Germany |
| Sex | | Dag Johan Haugerud | Norway, Sweden |
| Spying Stars | | Vimukthi Jayasundara | Sri Lanka, France, India |
| The Sun Rises on Us All | 日掛中天 | Cai Shangjun | China |
| Teki Cometh | 敵 | Daihachi Yoshida | Japan |
| Two Prosecutors | Zwei Staatsanwälte | Sergei Loznitsa | France, Germany, Romania, Latvia, Netherlands, Lithuania |
| Two Seasons, Two Strangers | 旅と日々 | Sho Miyake | Japan |
| What Does That Nature Say to You | 그 자연이 네게 뭐라고 하니 | Hong Sang-soo | South Korea |
| Yes | כן! | Nadav Lapid | France, Cyprus, Germany |
| Young Mothers | Jeunes mères | Jean-Pierre and Luc Dardenne | Belgium, France |

=== Canvas ===
| English title | Original title | Director(s) | Production countrie(s) |
|---|---|---|---|
| Angel's Egg (1985) | 天使のたまご | Mamoru Oshii | Japan |
| Arco | | Ugo Bienvenu | France, United States |
| The Square | 광장 | Kim Bo-sol | South Korea |

=== Reel of the World ===
| English title | Original title | Director(s) | Production countrie(s) |
|---|---|---|---|
| Back Home | 回家 | Tsai Ming-liang | Taiwan |
| Imago | | Déni Oumar Pitsaev | France, Belgium, Georgia |
| Landmarks | Nuestra tierra | Lucrecia Martel | Argentina, United States, Mexico, France, Netherlands, Denmark |
| Orwell: 2+2=5 | | Raoul Peck | France, United States |

== Awards ==
The following awards were presented at the festival:

Bangkok Grand Prix Award

Dry Leaf by Alexandre Koberidze

Special Jury Prize

Sound of Falling by Mascha Schilinski

Best Director Award

Pedro Pinho for I Only Rest in the Storm

New Voice Award

Secret of the Mountain Serpent by Nidhi Saxena

New Voices – Special Mention

Hair, Paper, Water... by Nicolas Graux and Trương Minh Quý

Thai Panorama Audience Award

DREAM! by Paul Spurrier and Jiriya Spurrier

The Best Asian Short Film Award

Attock by Awais Gohar and Delay by Hanxuan Wang

Short Film Audience Award

Grandma Nai Who Played Favorites by Chheangkea

Asian Short Films Competition – Special Mention

Grandma Nai Who Played Favorites by Chheangkea
