= 78th Locarno Film Festival =

2025 film festival

- Festival poster
- Opening film: In the Land of Arto
- Closing film: Kiss of the Spider Woman
- Location: Locarno, Switzerland
- Founded: 1946
- Awards: Golden Leopard: Two Seasons, Two Strangers
- Hosted by: Associazione Festival del film Locarno
- Artistic director: Giona A. Nazzaro
- No. of films: 221
- Festival date: Opening: 6 August 2025; Closing: 16 August 2025
- Website: Locarno Film Festival

Locarno Film Festival
- 79th 77th

The 78th Locarno Film Festival took place from 6 to 16 August 2025, in Locarno, Switzerland. Cambodian filmmaker Rithy Panh served as the jury president for the main competition.

Japanese drama film Two Seasons, Two Strangers by Sho Miyake was the winner of the Golden Leopard, the festival's main prize. Elsa Kremser and Levin Peter's White Snail was the winner of the Special Jury Prize. American filmmaker Alexander Payne was honoured with Leopard of Honour (Pardo d’Onore) on 15 August.

The festival poster was designed by the German artist Wolfgang Tillmans. The poster features the festival’s iconic leopard resting on a tree branch, surrounded by a vivid mix of yellow and purple abstract patterns. Artistic director, Giona A. Nazzaro, noted that Tillmans' artwork portrays a vision of a world where people can coexist and collaborate.

Tamara Stepanyan's drama film In the Land of Arto was the festival's opening film, while Bill Condon's Kiss of the Spider Woman was the festival's closing film.

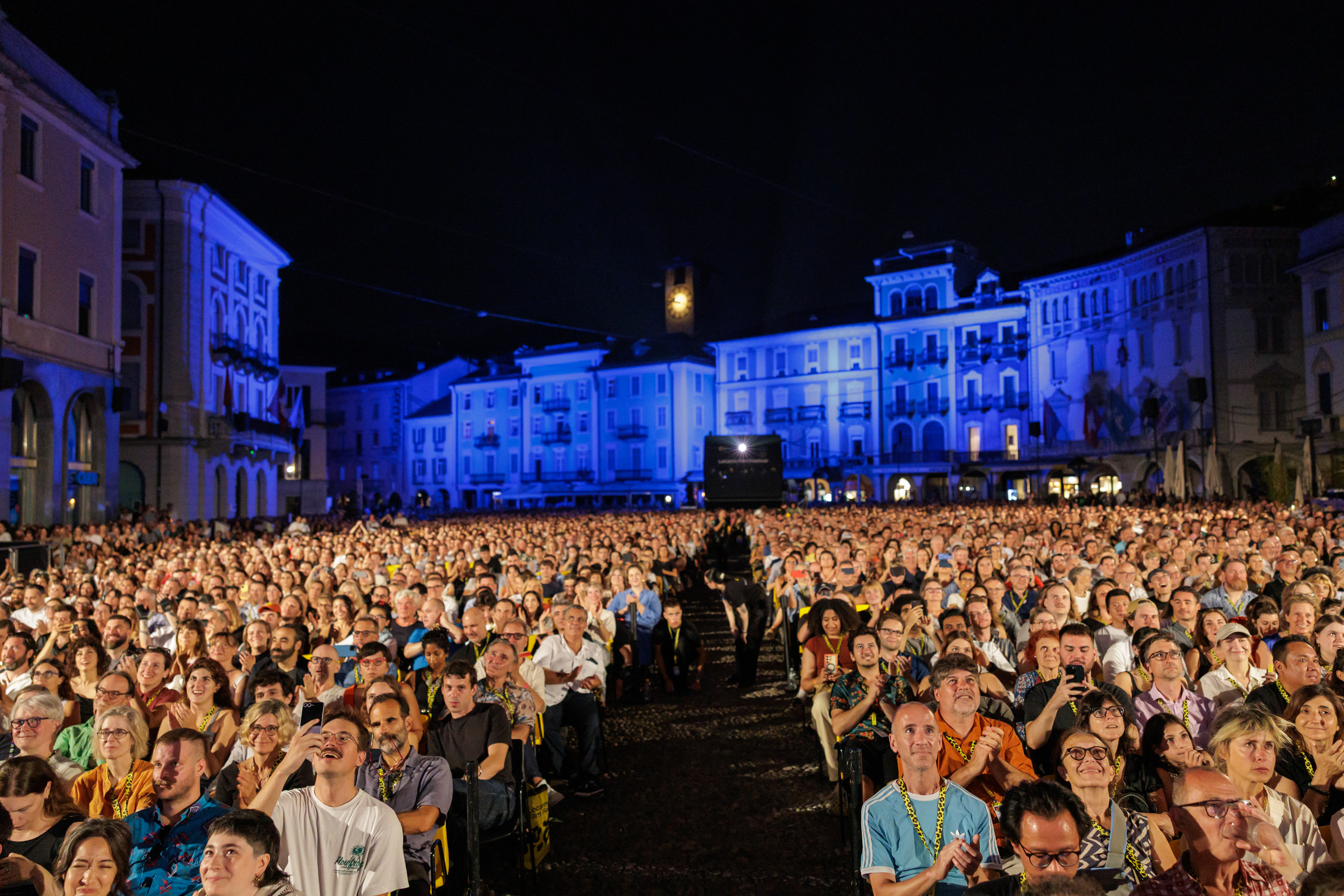
Crowd during Piazza Grande section public screenings

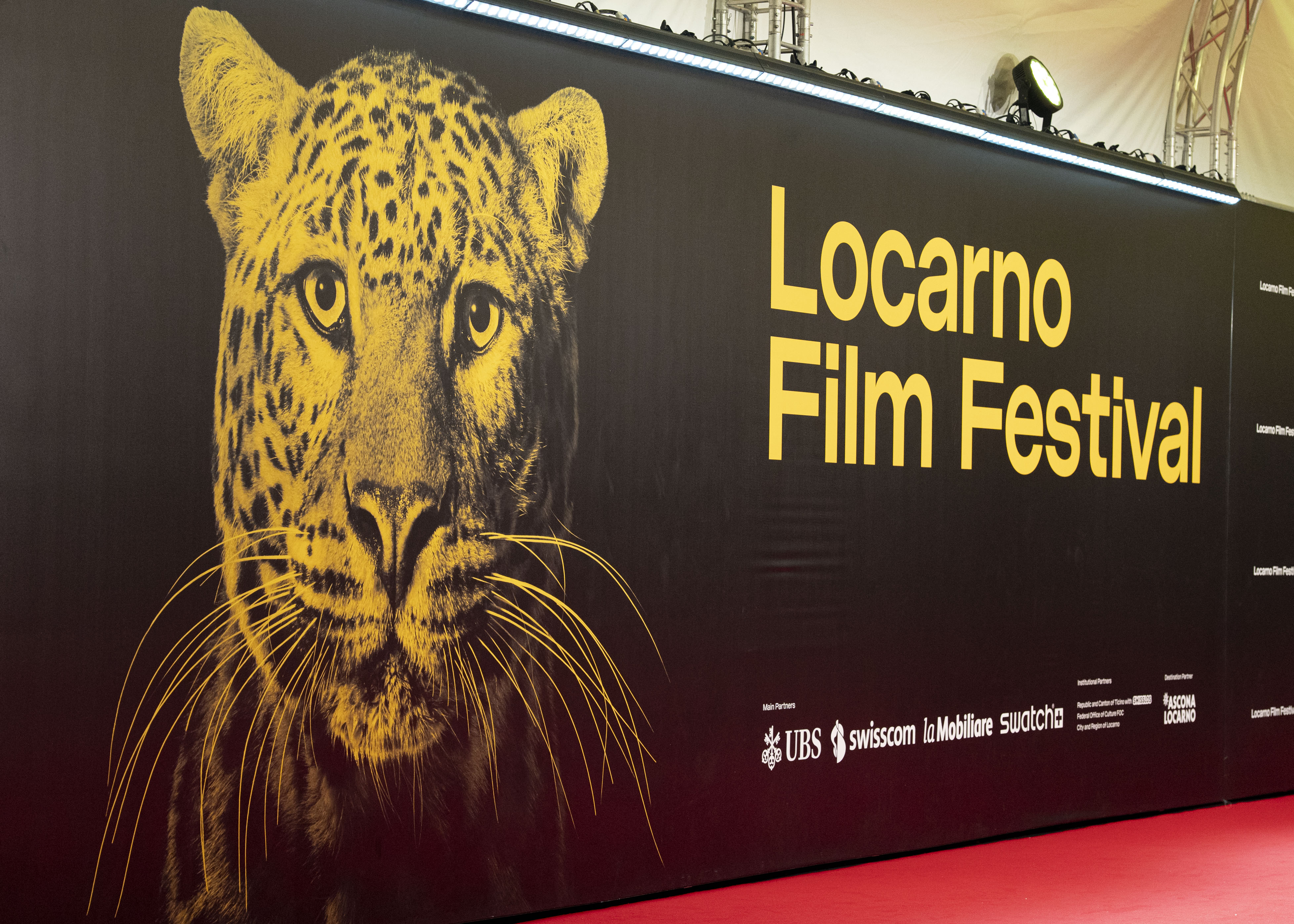
Red Carpet

== Juries ==
=== Main Competition ===
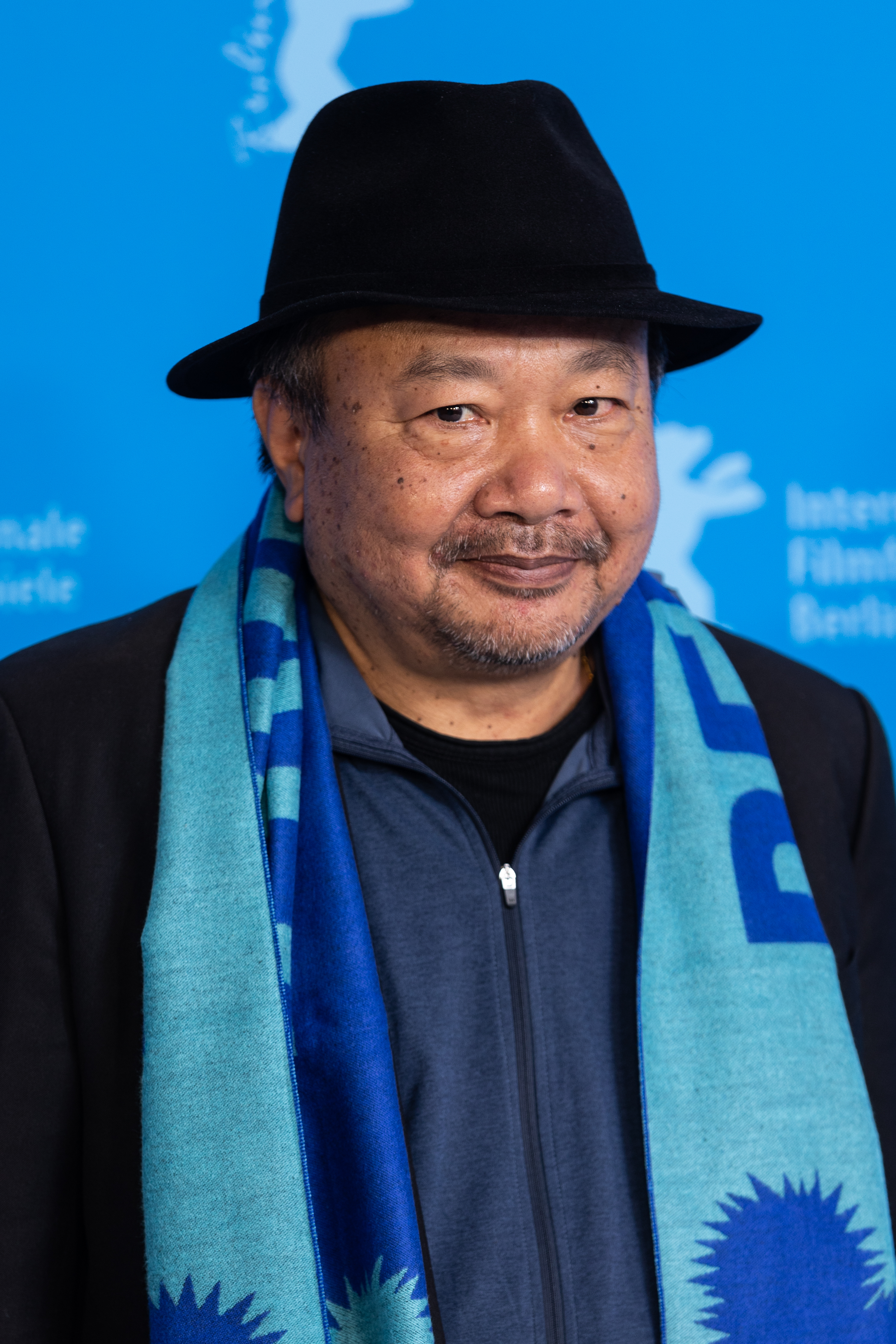
Rithy Panh Jury President for the Main Competition

- Rithy Panh, Cambodian filmmaker and author - Jury President
- Carlos Reygadas, Mexican filmmaker
- Joslyn Barnes, American film producer and writer
- Ursina Lardi, Swiss actress
- Renée Soutendijk, Dutch actress

=== Filmmakers of the Present Competition ===
- Asmara Abigail, Indonesian actress, dancer, and model
- La Frances Hui, Curator of Film at Museum of Modern Art and Co-chair of the festival New Directors/New Films
- Kani Kusruti, Indian actress

=== Leopard of Tomorrow Competition ===
- Jihan El-Tahri, French-Egyptian filmmaker and producer
- Lemohang Jeremiah Mosese, Mosotho filmmaker and visual artist.
- Sara Serraiocco, Italian actress

=== First Feature Competition ===
- James Hawkinson, American cinematographer
- Judith Lou Lévy, French producer and writer
- Patricia Mazuy, French filmmaker

=== Pardo Verde Competition ===
- Michael Almereyda, American filmmaker and film producer
- Martina Parenti, Italian filmmaker
- Seta Thakur, Swiss Head of Communications and Social Innovation, Wyss Academy for Nature

=== Independent Juries ===
==== Ecumenical Jury ====
- Melanie Pollmeier, Switzerland
- Ileana Bîrsan, Romania
- Philippe Cabrol, France
- Roland Kauffmann, France

==== FIPRESCI Award ====
- Alonso Aguilar Candanedo, Costa Rica
- Alessandro Amato, Italy
- Savina Petkova, Bulgaria
- Sabrina Schwob, Switzerland
- Britt Sørensen, Norwegian author

==== Europa Cinemas Label ====
- Yuliia Antypova, Ukraine
- Catherine Lemaire, Belgium
- Roxanne Sayegh, Canada
- Verena von Stackelberg, German film curator and programmer

==== Grand Prix Semaine de la Critique – Prix SRG SSR 2025 - Critics' Week Grand Prize ====
- Stéphane Gobbo, Switzerland
- Mala Reinhardt, Germany
- Simonetta Sommaruga, Switzerland

==== The Premio Cinema Ticino Jury ====
- Cristina Trezzini, Jury President
- Nicola Bernasconi
- Frédéric Maire
- Antonio Mariotti
- Seraina Rohrer, Swiss audiovisual executive, academic, and innovation specialist for the creative industries.

== Official sections ==
On 8 July the festival announced its line-up for this edition. It will screen 221 films, including 99 world premieres. The selection committee for feature films was composed by Pamela Biénzobas, Stefan Ivančić, Giovanni Marchini-Camia and Daniela Persico, with Eddie Bertozzi serving as advisor for the competitive sections.

=== Piazza Grande ===
The following films were selected for the Piazza Grande section, these are eligible for Prix du public award:

English Title	Original Title	Director(s)	Production Country
The Birthday Party		Miguel Ángel Jiménez	Greece, Spain, Netherlands, United Kingdom
Dead of Winter		Brian Kirk	United States, Germany
The Deal (TV series)		Jean-Stéphane Bron	Switzerland, France, Luxembourg, Belgium
Heads or Tails?	Testa O Croce?	Alessio Rigo de Righi and Matteo Zoppis	Italy, United States
In the Land of Arto (opening film)	Le Pays D’arto	Tamara Stepanyan	France, Armenia
Irkala – Gilgamesh’s Dream	Irkalla Hulm Jijiljamish	Mohamed Al-Daradji	Iraq, United Arab Emirates, Qatar, France, United Kingdom, Saudi Arabia
It Was Just an Accident	Un Simple Accident	Jafar Panahi	Iran, France, Luxembourg
Kiss of the Spider Woman (closing film)		Bill Condon	United States, Uruguay
The Little Sister	La Petite Dernière	Hafsia Herzi	France, Germany
Police Story (1985)	警察故事	Jackie Chan	Hong Kong
Rosemead		Eric Lin	United States
Sentimental Value	Affeksjonsverdi	Joachim Trier	Norway, France, Denmark, Germany, Sweden
The Shining (1980)		Stanley Kubrick	United Kingdom, United States
Together		Michael Shanks	Australia, United States

=== Main Competition (Concorso Internazionale) ===
The following films were selected for the Golden Leopard competition:

English Title	Original Title	Director(s)	Production Country
Desire Lines	Linije Želje	Dane Komljen	Serbia, Bosnia-Herzegovina, Netherlands, Croatia, Germany
Donkey Days		Rosanne Pel	Netherlands, Germany
Dracula		Radu Jude	Romania, Austria, Luxembourg
Dry Leaf	ხმელი ფოთოლი	Alexandre Koberidze	Germany, Georgia
God Will Not Help	Bog Neće Pomoći	Hana Jušić	Croatia, Italy, Romania, Greece, France, Slovenia
The Lake	Le Lac	Fabrice Aragno	Switzerland
Mare's Nest		Ben Rivers	United Kingdom, France, Canada
Mektoub, My Love: Canto Due		Abdellatif Kechiche	France
Mosquitoes	Le Bambine	Valentina Bertani and Nicole Bertani	Italy, Switzerland, France
Phantoms of July	Sehnsucht in Sangerhausen	Julian Radlmaier	Germany
The Seasons	As Estações	Maureen Fazendeiro	Portugal, France, Spain, Austria
Solomamma		Janicke Askevold	Norway, Latvia, Lithuania, Denmark, Finland
Sorella di Clausura		Ivana Mladenović	Romania, Serbia, Italy, Spain
Two Seasons, Two Strangers	旅と日々	Sho Miyake	Japan
Tales of the Wounded Land		Abbas Fahdel	Lebanon
White Snail		Elsa Kremser and Levin Peter	Austria, Germany
With Hasan in Gaza	مع حسن في غزّة	Kamal Aljafari	Palestine, Germany, France, Qatar
Yakushima's Illusion	L'Illusion de Yakushima	Naomi Kawase	France, Japan, Belgium, Luxembourg

=== Out of Competition ===
English Title	Original Title	Director(s)	Production Country
Bobò		Pippo Delbono	Italy
Le Chantier		Jean-Stéphane Bron	France, Switzerland
The Deal		Jean-Stéphane Bron	Switzerland, France, Luxembourg, Belgium
Deathstalker		Steven Kostanski	United States, Canada
E		Anna Eriksson	Finland
Exile	إغتراب	Mehdi Hmili	Tunisia, Luxembourg, France, Qatar, Saudi ARabia
I Live Here Now		Julie Pacino	United States
Judas' Gospel	Il Vangelo di Giuda	Giulio Base	Italy, Poland
Keep Quiet		Vincent Grashaw	United States
Kerouac's Road: The Beat of a Nation		Ebs Burnough	United Kingdom, United States
Legend of the Happy Worker		Duwayne Dunham	United States
Nova '78		Aaron Brookner, Rodrigo Areias	United Kingdom, Portugal
Silence (series)	Silencio	Eduardo Casanova	Spain
Some Notes on the Current Situation		Eran Kolirin	Israel

=== Filmmakers of the Present Competition (Concorso Cineasti del Presente) ===
The Concorso Cineasti del Presente, also known as the Filmmakers of the Present Competition, showcases first and second feature films from emerging filmmakers.

English Title	Original Title	Director(s)	Production Country
Affection Affection		Alexia Walther, Maxime Matray	France
A Balcony in Limoges	Un balcon à Limoges	Jérôme Reybaud	France
Balearic		Ion de Sosa	Spain, France
Becoming		Zhannat Alshanova	France, Kazakhstan, Netherlands, Lithuania
Blue Heron		Sophy Romvari	Canada, Hungary
Don't Let Me Die	Nu mă lăsa să mor	Andrei Epure	Romania, Bulgaria, France
Don't Let the Sun		Jacqueline Zünd	Switzerland, Italy
Fantasy		Kukla Kesherovic	Slovenia, North Macedonia
The Fin		Park Syeyoung	South Korea, Germany, Qatar
Follies	Folichonneries	Eric K. Boulianne	Canada
Hair, Paper, Water...	Tóc, Giấy và Nước	Nicolas Graux and Minh Quý Trương	Belgium, France, Vietnam
Hijo Mayor		Cecilia Kang	Argentina, France
Olivia		Sofía Petersen	Argentina, United Kingdom, Spain
The Plant from the Canaries		Ruan Lan-Xi	Germany
Sweetheart	Gioia mia	Margherita Spampinato	Italy

=== Leopard of Tomorrow - Concorso Corti d'Autore ===
The Concorso Corti d'Autore portion of the Leopard of Tomorrow competition features short films by established filmmakers.

English Title	Original Title	Director(s)	Production Country
Cairo Streets		Abdellah Taïa	France
Hysterical Fit oF Laughter	Histeriöni Napad Smeha	Dušan Zorić and Matija Gluščević	Serbia, Croatia
Index		Radu Muntean	Romania
Late Harvest	Späternte	Katharina Huber	Germany
The Sleeping Beauty	Nang Norn	Mattie Do	United States, Laos, Thailand
Slet 1988		Marta Popivoda	Germany, France, Serbia
Solitudes		Ryan McKenna	Canada
The Dog Is My Dog	Su Cane Est Su Miu	Salvatore Mereu	Italy
A South-Facing Window	Une fenetre pi-ein sud	Lkhagvadulam Purev-Ochir	France, Mongolia
A Very Straight Neck		Neo Sora	Japan, China

=== Leopard of Tomorrow - Concorso Internazionale ===
The Concorso Internazionale portion of the Leopard of Tomorrow competition features short and medium-length films by emerging international directors.

English Title	Original Title	Director(s)	Production Country
Baisanos		Andrés Khamis Giacoman and Francisca Khamis Giacoman	Chile, Spain, Palestine
Bleifrei 95	Unleaded 95	Emma Hütt and Tina Emy Muffler	Austria, Germany
Blind, Into the Eye		Atefeh Kheirabadi and Mehrad Sepahnia	Germany, Iran
BOA		Alexandre Dostie	Canada, France
Eldorado		Anton Bialas	France
Force Times Displacement		Angel WU	Taiwan
Happily Ever After		Elodie Beaumont Tarillon	France
Honey, My Love, So Sweet		JT Trinidad	Philippines
Hyena		Altay Ulan Yang	United States
Primera Enseñanza		Aria Sánchez and Marina Meira	Cuba, Spain, Brazil
Still Playing		Mohamed Mesbah	France
The Uniformed		Timon Ott	Germany
What We Leave Behind	Ce qu'on laisse derrière	Alexandra Myotte and Jean-Sébastien Hamel	Canada
Yo Yo		Mohammadreza Mayghani	France, Iran

=== Leopard of Tomorrow - Concorso Nazionale ===
The Concorso Nazionale portion of the Leopard of Tomorrow competition features short and medium-length films by emerging Swiss directors.

Original Title	English Title	Director(s)	Production Country
Air Horse One		Lasse Linder	Switzerland, Belgium
Black Mornings	Noirs Matins	David Gonseth	Switzerland
I-Iavant-Poste 21		Camille Surdez	Switzerland
I'm Not Sure	Ich Bin Nicht Sicher	Luisa Zürcher	Switzerland
The Gods	Les Dieux	Anas Sareen	Switzerland
Lost Touch		Justine Klaiber	Switzerland
Nest		Stefania Burla	Switzerland
Rio Remains Beautiful	O Rio De Janeiro Continua I-Indo	Felipe Casanova	Belgium, Brazil, Switzerland
Tusen Toner		Francesco Poloni	Switzerland
Yonne		Julietta Korbel and Yan Ciszewski	Switzerland, France

=== Retrospective - Great Expectations: British Postwar Cinema 1945-1960 ===
A tribute to British cinema from that period. More than 40 films screened in partnership with the BFI National Archive and the Cinémathèque suisse, with the support of StudioCanal and curated by Ehsan Khoshbakht.

Title	Director(s)	Production Country
A Diary for Timothy (short) (1945)	Humphrey Jennings	United Kingdom
A Portrait of Ga (short) (1952)	Margaret Tait	United Kingdom
The Astonished Heart (1950)	Terence Fisher and Antony Darnborough	United Kingdom
Brighton Rock (1948)	John Boulting	United Kingdom
Cast a Dark Shadow (1955)	Lewis Gilbert	United Kingdom
The Clouded Yellow (1950)	Ralph Thomas	United Kingdom
Daughter of Darkness (1948)	Lance Comfort	United Kingdom
The Elephant Will Never Forget (1953)	John Krish	United Kingdom
The Fallen Idol (1948)	Carol Reed	United Kingdom
The Flying Scot (1957)	Compton Bennett	United Kingdom
The Happiest Days of Your Life (1950)	Frank Launder	United Kingdom
The Happy Family (1952)	Muriel Box	United Kingdom
Hell Drivers (1957)	Cy Endfield	United Kingdom
Hell Is a City (1960)	Val Guest	United Kingdom
Hunted (1952)	Charles Crichton	United Kingdom
I Know Where I'm Going! (1945)	Michael Powell and Emeric Pressburger	United Kingdom
I'm All Right Jack (1959)	John Boulting	United Kingdom
It Always Rains on Sunday (1947)	Robert Hamer	United Kingdom
Last Holiday (1950)	Henry Cass	United Kingdom
Mandy (1952)	Alexander Mackendrick	United Kingdom
Never Let Go (1960)	John Guillermin	United Kingdom
Night and the City (1950)	Jules Dassin	United Kingdom
Nowhere to Go (1958)	Seth Holt	United Kingdom
Obsession (1949)	Edward Dmytryk	United Kingdom
Odd Man Out (1947)	Carol Reed	United Kingdom
The Passionate Friends (1949)	David Lean	United Kingdom
Passport to Pimlico (1949)	Henry Cornelius	United Kingdom
Peeping Tom (1960)	Michael Powell	United Kingdom
Pool of London (1951)	Basil Dearden	United Kingdom
The Shop at Sly Corner (1947)	George King	United Kingdom
The Stranger Left No Card (short) (1952)	Wendy Toye	United Kingdom
Simon and Laura (1955)	Muriel Box	United Kingdom
Temptation Harbour (1947)	Lance Comfort	United Kingdom
They Made Me a Fugitive (1947)	Alberto Cavalcanti	United Kingdom
This Was a Woman (1948)	Tim Whelan	United Kingdom
The Three Weird Sisters (1948)	Daniel Birt	United Kingdom
Tiger in the Smoke (1956)	Roy Ward Baker	United Kingdom
Time Without Pity (1957)	Joseph Losey	United Kingdom
To Be a Woman (1951)	Jill Craigie	United Kingdom
Train of Events (1949)	Sidney Cole, Charles Crichton and Basil Dearden	United Kingdom
Turn the Key Softly (1953)	Jack Lee	United Kingdom
Whisky Galore! (1949)	Alexander Mackendrick	United Kingdom
Whispering Smith Hits London (1952)	Francis Searle	United Kingdom
The Woman in Question (1950)	Anthony Asquith	United Kingdom
The Yellow Balloon (1953)	J. Lee Thompson	United Kingdom

=== Histoire(s) du Cinéma ===
The restored version of Roberto Rossellini's classic film Anno uno (Year One, 1974), will be screened in the festival as part of this section.

English Title	Original Title	Director(s)	Production Country
Leopard Club Award to Emma Thompson
Sense And Sensibility (1995)		Ang Lee	United States
Premio Raimondo Rezzonico award to Abbout Productions
Costa Brava, Lebanon (2021)	كوستا برافا، لبنان	Mounia Akl	Lebanon, France, Spain, Sweden, Denmark, Norway, Qatar
Memory Box (2021)		Joana Hadjithomas and Khalil Joreige	Lebanon, Canada, France, Qatar
Leopard Career Award to Jackie Chan
Project A (1983)	A計劃	Jackie Chan	Hong Kong
Leopard of Honour to Alexander Payne
The Descendants (2011)		Alexander Payne	United States
Nebraska (2013)		Alexander Payne	United States
Vision Award Ticinomoda to Milena Canonero
Megalopolis (2024)		Francis Ford Coppola	United States
Premio Cinema Ticino award to Michele Dell'Ambrogio
L'Atalante (1934)		Jean Vigo	France
Cinéma Suisse Redécouvert
Bad Manners (1973)	Les vilaines manières	Simon Edelstein	Switzerland, France
L'Ogre (1986)		Simon Edelstein	Switzerland, France
Locarno Heritage
Anno uno (1974)		Roberto Rossellini	Italy
The Year of the Cannibals (1969)	I Cannibali	Liliana Cavani	Italy
Histoire(s) du Cinéma
4 (2004)		Ilya Khrzhanovsky	Russia, Netherlands
A Bay of Blood (1971)	Reazione a catena	Mario Bava	Italy
Silent Light (2007)	Stellet Licht	Carlos Reygadas	Mexico, France, Netherlands, Germany

=== Open Doors Screenings ===
The Open Doors focused on 42 countries of the African continent.

English Title	Original Title	Director(s)	Production Country
Ancestral Visions of the Future		Lemohang Jeremiah Mosese	France, Lesotho, Germany, Saudi Arabia, Qatar
Bougainvillea		Yasir Faiz	Egypt, Sudan
Jangu		Patience Nitumwesiga	Uganda
God'S Dream		Fousseyni Maïga, Mariam Kamissoko	Mali
Nome		Sana Na N'Hada	Guinea-Bissau, France, Portugal, Angola
Omi Nobi (The New Man)		Carlos Yuri Ceuninck	Cape Verde, Belgium, Germany, Sudan
The Bride		Myriam Birara	Rwanda
So Long a Letter		Angèle Diabang	Senegal, Mali, France, Ivory Coast, Egypt
VUTA N'KUVUTE (Tug of War)		Amil Shivji	Tanzania, South Africa, Germany, Qatar
When Nigeria Happens		Ema Edosio Share	Nigeria
The Last Journey		Abdoulaye Sall	Mauritania, Senegal
The Envoy of God		Amina Abdoulaye Mamani	Niger, Burkina Faso, Rwanda
Where My Memory Began		Priscillia Kounkou Hoveyda	Sierra Leone

=== Locarno Kids ===
The following films will be screened in this section. The opening film of the section is Arco, a French animated feature about the fate of a world impacted by the climate change.

English Title	Original Title	Director(s)	Production Country
Arco (opening film)		Ugo Bienvenu	United States, France
Fantastique		Marjolijn Prins	Belgium
The Badgers (closing film)	Grevlingene	Paul M. Lundø	Norway
I Won't Leave You Alone	Non ti lascio solo	Fabrizio Cattani	Italy
Olivia and the Invisible Earthquake	L’Olívia i el terratrèmol invisible	Irene Iborra Rizo	Spain
Pixie. The New Beginning	Skrzat. Nowy początek	Krzysztof Komander	Poland, Czech Republic
Secret Delivery	Tichá pošta	Ján Sebechlebský	Czech Republic, Slovakia, Serbia

== Independent sections ==
=== International Critics' Week (Semaine de la Critique) ===
English Title	Original Title	Director(s)	Production Country
Flying Scents - of Plants and People		Antshi von Moos	Switzerland
Green Light	Grünes Licht	Pavel Cuzuioc	Austria, Romania
In the Penal Colony	Nella colonia penale	Gaetano Crivaro, Silvia Perra, Ferruccio Goia, Alberto Diana	Italy
She		Parsifal Reparato	Italy, France
Silent Legacy		Jenni Kivistö, Jussi Rastas	Finland, France, Burkina Faso
The Cowboy		André Hörmann	Germany, United States
Celtic Utopia	Útóipe Cheilteach	Dennis Harvey, Lars Lovén	Sweden, Ireland

=== Swiss Panorama (Panorama Suisse) ===
The independent Panorama Suisse section features highlights of contemporary Swiss cinema.

English Title	Original Title	Director(s)	Production Country
1:10		Sinan Taner	Switzerland
Bagger Drama		Piet Baumgartner	Switzerland
Pictures In The Head		Eleonora Camizzi	Switzerland
Frieda's Fall		Maria Brendle	Switzerland
Late Shift	Heldin	Petra Volpe	Switzerland, Germany
The Boy From The Drina		Zijad Ibrahimovic	Switzerland
Immortals		Maja Tschumi	Switzerland, Iraq
The Courageous	Les Courageux	Jasmin Gordon	Switzerland
Quir		Nicola Bellucci	Switzerland
The Safe House	La cache	Lionel Baier	Switzerland, Luxembourg, France
Wisdom of Happiness		Barbara Miller, Philip Delaquis	Switzerland
Who Goes Hunting		Lea Favre	Switzerland

== Industry Selections (Locarno Factory) ==
The Locarno Film Festival honors its heritage while embracing innovation, adapting to new audiences and trends. By involving young generations through dedicated training, the Festival strengthens its impact locally and globally.

=== Locarno Residency ===
The Locarno Residency supports emerging filmmakers developing their first feature film through a two-phase program. Ten selected participants join workshops and discussions during the Locarno Film Festival, after which three projects (two international, one Swiss) are chosen for a year-long mentorship, including online and in-person sessions in Venice and Arles.

Name	Country(ies)	Production company	Original Project Title	English Project Title
Mouloud Ouyahia	Algeria, France	Oeil Vif productions/ Nana Prod	Al Madda	The Rift
Gala Hernández López	France, Spain	Les Films du Bal / Andergraun Films	All Night I Make the Night in Me	
Leonardo Pirondi	Brazil, Portugal		AMERIKA'ATINGA	
Ágata de Pinho	Portugal, Luxembourg	Uma Pedra no Sapato / Paul Thiltges Distributions	Femmes de Ménage	Women Who Clean
Maryam Tafakory	Iran, England	Vera Baxter Productions	Hospital of Irremediable Desires	
Andrew Norman Wilson	Switzerland, USA		Interlaken	
Li Shuen Lam	Singapore, Indonesia, Germany	13 Little Pictures / Palari Films / In Good Company	Keinginan	Strange Root
Mark Chua	Singapore, Indonesia, Germany	13 Little Pictures / Palari Films / In Good Company	Keinginan	Strange Root
Elisa Baccolo	Italy, Switzerland		Pelle	Skin
Ifeyinwa Arinze	Nigeria		Scruples	
Luka Papić	Serbia	Ranč production	Viteška posla	Knights Anonymous

==== Locarno Residency Jury ====
- Carlo Cresto-Dina (Film producer, Italy)
- Jing XU (Sales manager, China)
- Stefan Ivančić (Film director, producer and programmer)

===== Locarno Residency Tutors =====
- Tizian Büchi (Swiss director and programmer)
- Anna Ciennik (Script consultant, France)
- Stefan Ivančić (Film director, producer and programmer)

=== Locarno Academy ===
The Locarno Academy is a professional training initiative by the Locarno Film Festival, created to develop the skills of young filmmakers, critics, and film industry professionals.

==== Filmmakers Academy ====
The Locarno Filmmakers Academy, a ten-day intensive program for emerging filmmakers.

Name	Country
Ali Yahya Al-Ameri	Iraq
Andrea Muñoz	Colombia
Beza Hailu Lemma	Ethiopia
Bohao Liu	China
Dimitri Gorbaty	Russia
Erenik Beqiri	Albania
Flóra Anna Buda	Hungary
Giada Bossi	Italy
Johnson Cheng	United States
Nathan Ghali	France
Ngoc Duy Le	Vietnam
Olivia Frey	Switzerland
Pom Bunsermvicha	Thailand
Rodrigo Ribeyro	Brazil
Simon Maria Kubiena	Austria
Tatjana Fanny Honegger	Switzerland
Tynystan Temirzhan	Kyrgyzstan
Walt Mzengi Corey	Tanzania
Xiwen Cong	China
Yihan Lin	China

==== Critics Academy ====
The Locarno Critics Academy is a 10-day workshop that introduces young writers to film festivals, offering hands-on coverage and sessions with industry professionals.

Name	Country
Bandamlak Y. Jemberie	Ethiopia
Botagoz Koilybayeva	Kazakhstan
Cátia Rodrigues	Portugal
Charlyne Genoud	Switzerland
Jason Liwag	Filipina
José Emilio Gonzalez Calvillo	Mexico
Olivia J. Bennett	Australia
Olivia Popp	United States
Saffron Maeve	Canada
Sonya Vseliubska	Ukraine

== Official Awards ==
=== Piazza Grande ===
- Prix du public: Rosemead by Eric Lin

=== Main Competition ===
- Golden Leopard: Two Seasons, Two Strangers by Sho Miyake
- Special Jury Prize: White Snail by Elsa Kremser and Levin Peter
- Pardo for Best Direction: Abbas Fahdel for Tales of the Wounded Land
- Pardo for Best Performance:
  - Marya Imbro for White Snail
  - Mikhail Senkov for White Snail
  - Manuela Martelli for God Will Not Help
  - Ana Marija Veselčić for God Will Not Help
- Special Mention: Dry Leaf by Alexandre Koberidze

=== Concorso Cineasti del Presente ===
- Golden Leopard – Filmmakers of the Present: Hair, Paper, Water... by Nicolas Graux and Minh Quý Trương
- Best Emerging Director Award: Cecilia Kang for Hijo Mayor
- Special Jury Prize CINÉ+: Sweetheart by Margherita Spampinato
- Pardo for Best Performance:
  - Aurora Quattrocchi for Sweetheart
  - Levan Gelbakhiani for Don't Let the Sun

=== Pardi di Domani ===
- Pardino d’Oro WePresent by WeTransfer for the Best Auteur Short Film: A Very Straight Neck by Neo Sora
- Pardino d'Oro Arts3 Foundation for the Best International Short Film: Hyena by Altay Ulan Yang
- Pardino d’Oro SRG SSR for the Best Swiss Short Film: Rio Remains Beautiful by Felipe Casanova
- Pardino d'Argento Arts3 Foundation for the International Competition: Still Playing by Mohamed Mesbah
- Pardino d’Argento SRG SSR for the National Competition: Tusen Toner by Francesco Poloni
- Pardi di Domani Best Direction Award – BONALUMI Engineering: Primera Enseñanza by Aria Sánchez and Marina Meira
- Best Swiss Newcomer Award: Camille Surdez for I-Iavant-Poste 21
- Medien Patent Verwaltung AG Award: Force Times Displacement by Angel WU

=== First Feature Film Competition ===
- Blue Heron by Sophy Romvari

=== Pardo Verde ===
- Mare's Nest by Ben Rivers
- Special Mentions:
  - Hair, Paper, Water... by Nicolas Graux and Minh Quý Trương
  - A South-Facing Window by Lkhagvadulam Purev-Ochir

=== Prize of the Ecumenical Jury ===
- Solomamma by Janicke Askevold, Norway, Latvia, Lithuania, Denmark, Finland
- Special Mention:
  - The Lake by Fabrice Aragno, Switzerland

=== FIPRESCI Prize ===
- Dry Leaf by Alexandre Koberidze

=== Europa Cinemas Label ===
- With Hasan in Gaza by Kamal Aljafari, Palestine, Germany, France, Qatar

== Special awards ==
=== Leopard of Honour (Pardo d’Onore Manor) ===
- Alexander Payne

=== Lifetime Achievement Award ===
- Lucy Liu
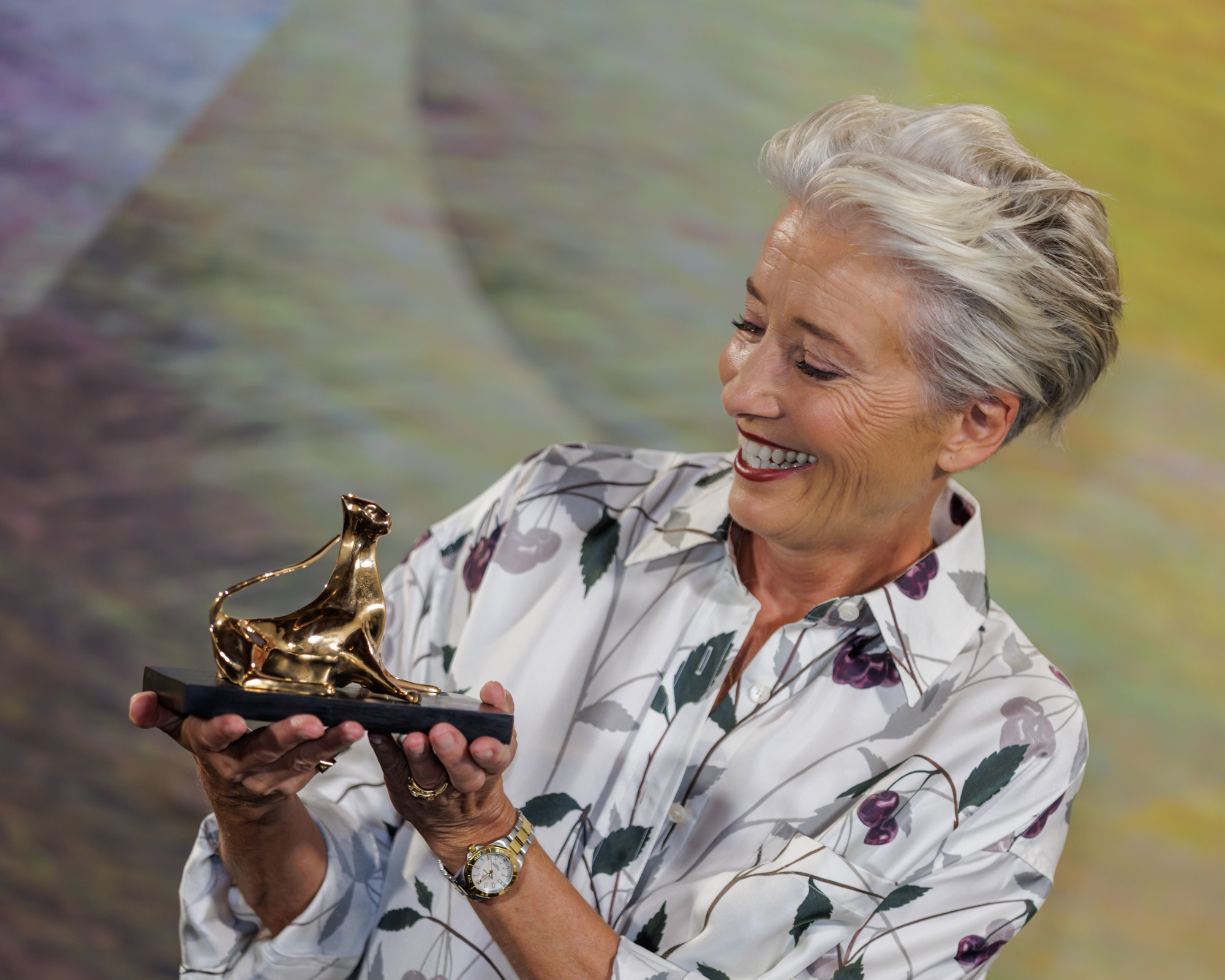
  Emma Thompson recipient of Leopard Club Award

=== Leopard Club Award ===
- Emma Thompson

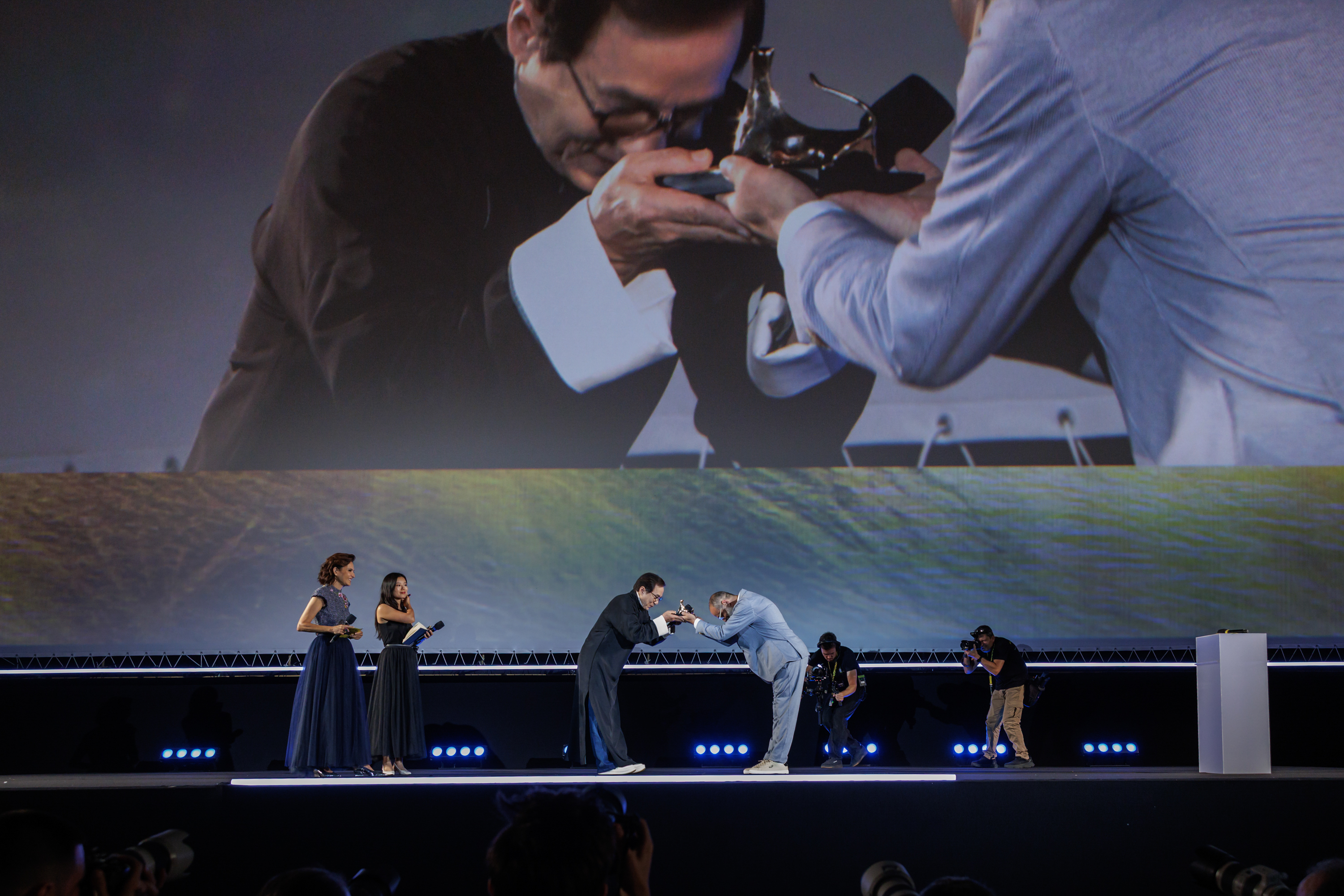
Jackie Chan, 2025 recipient of the Leopard Career Award

=== Pardo alla carriera (Leopard Career Award) ===
- Jackie Chan

=== Premio Raimondo Rezzonico ===
- Abbout Productions, led by Georges Schoucair and Myriam Sassine

=== Vision Award Ticinomoda ===
- Milena Canonero

=== Locarno Kids Award la Mobiliare ===
- Marcel Barelli

=== Premio Cinema Ticino Award ===
- Michele Dell'Ambrogio

=== Excellence Award Davide Campari ===
- Golshifteh Farahani
