= Quit Staring at My Plate =

- Directed by: Hana Jušić
- Written by: Hana Jušić
- Produced by: Ankica Juric Tilic
- Starring: Mia Petričević
- Cinematography: Jana Plecas
- Music by: Hrvoje Niksic
- Release date: 2 September 2016 (Venice Film Festival)
- Countries: Croatia; Denmark
- Language: Croatian

Quit Staring at My Plate (Croatian: Ne gledaj mi u pijat) is a 2016 Croatian-Danish drama film written and directed by Hana Jušić.

The film premiered in the Venice Days section at the 73rd edition of the Venice Film Festival, in which it was awarded the Fedeora Award for Best European Film. It was selected as the Croatian entry for the Best Foreign Language Film at the 90th Academy Awards, but it was not nominated.

== Plot ==
After her domineering father has a stroke, a 24-year-old woman becomes the sole breadwinner of a family. She adjusts to her newfound role and the freedom that it gives. An overbearing responsibility of supporting her entitled mother and lazy older brother who the family has treated as disabled breaks and mends her from time to time.

== Cast ==
- Mia Petričević as Marijana
- Nikša Butijer as Zoran
- Arijana Čulina as Vera
- Zlatko Burić as Lazo
- Karla Brbić as Andjela
- Bruna Bebić-Tudor as Ivana
- Marijana Mikulić as Katarina

== See also ==
- List of submissions to the 90th Academy Awards for Best Foreign Language Film
- List of Croatian submissions for the Academy Award for Best Foreign Language Film
