= A South-Facing Window =

2025 Mongolian-French short film

- Promotional poster
- French: Une fenêtre plein sud
- Mongolian: Урагшаа харсан цонх
- Directed by: Lkhagvadulam Purev-Ochir
- Written by: Lkhagvadulam Purev-Ochir
- Produced by: Katia Khazak; Charlotte Vincent; Oyundari Khurelbaatar
- Starring: Azzaya Munkhbat; Altanshagai Munkhnasan; Oyuntsetseg Tsogbadrakh
- Cinematography: Vasco Viana
- Edited by: Matthieu Taponier
- Music by: Harry Allouche
- Production companies: Aurora Films; Guru Media
- Distributed by: Shortcuts
- Release date: 10 August 2025 (Locarno)
- Running time: 19 minutes
- Countries: Mongolia; France
- Language: Mongolian

A South-Facing Window (French: Une fenêtre plein sud) is a 2025 Mongolian–French short drama film, written and directed by Lkhagvadulam Purev-Ochir. Nineteen minutes film explores a young Ulaanbaatar couple wrestling with love, mistakes, and hope between harsh reality and elusive dreams.

The film had its world premiere in the Concorso Corti d'Autore portion of the Pardi di Domani competition of the 78th Locarno Film Festival on 10 August 2025, where it was nominated for the Pardino d’Oro Swiss Life for the Best Auteur Short Film.

== Synopsis ==
Azaa and Shaghai, both approaching their thirties, reside in Ulaanbaatar with their six-year-old daughter. As their relationship teeters on the edge of collapse, they seek traces of joy by wandering through vacant homes. Amid gridlocked streets and suffocating traffic, tensions boil over into a heated dispute.

== Cast ==
- Azzaya Munkhbat as Azaa
- Altanshagai Munkhnasan as Shaghai
- Oyuntsetseg Tsogbadrakh
- Odgerel Bat-Orshikh
- Sarangerel Sukhbaatar
- Batbayar Shagdarjav

== Release ==
A South-Facing Window had its World Premiere at the Concorso Corti d'Autore portion of the Pardi di Domani competition of the 78th Locarno Film Festival on 10 August 2025, and competed for the Pardino d’Oro Swiss Life for the Best Auteur Short Film. It was screened in Short Cuts section (Program 3) of the 2025 Toronto International Film Festival on 7 September 2025.

The film also competed for 'Prix Loup Argenté' in the International Competition 1 for Short Films at the 2025 Festival du nouveau cinéma from 8 to 19 October 2025. It was screened on 7 November 2025 at the 22nd Seville European Film Festival.

In 2026 it was screened at the South by Southwest London on 2 June.

== Accolades ==
Award	Date of ceremony	Category	Recipient	Result	Ref.
Prix Unifrance du court-métrage	20 May 2025	Special Jury Prize (Grand Prix)	A South-Facing Window	Won	
Locarno Film Festival	16 August 2025	Pardino d’Oro Swiss Life for the Best Auteur Short Film	A South-Facing Window	Nominated	
Locarno Film Festival	16 August 2025	Pardo Verde: Special Mentions	A South-Facing Window	Won	
Festival du nouveau cinéma	19 October 2025	Prix Loup Argenté	A South-Facing Window	Nominated	
