= Mosquitoes (film) =

2025 film by Valentina and Nicole Bertani

- Festival poster
- Italian: Le bambine
- Directed by: Valentina Bertani; Nicole Bertani
- Written by: Maria Sole Limodio; Valentina Bertani; Nicole Bertani
- Produced by: Daniele Esposito; Michela Pini; Olga Lamontanara; Philippe Gompel; Birgit Kemner; Marco Colombo; Nicola Rosada; Guillaume Marien
- Starring: Mia Ferricelli; Agnese Scazza; Petra Scheggia; Clara Tramontano; Milutin Dapčević; Jessica Piccolo Valerani; Cristina Donadio; Matteo Martari
- Cinematography: Marco Bassano; Luca Costantini
- Edited by: Marcello Saurino
- Music by: Lorenzo Confetta; Golden Rain: Roberto Vernetti
- Production companies: Emma Film; Cinédokké; Manny Films; Adler Entertainment; 360 Degrees Film; Mathematic
- Distributed by: Adler Entertainment
- Release date: 12 August 2025 (Locarno)
- Running time: 105 minutes
- Countries: Italy; Switzerland; France
- Language: Italian

Mosquitoes (Italian: Le bambine, lit. 'The girls') is a 2025 coming-of-age comedy drama film co-written and directed by Valentina and Nicole Bertani. The film had its world premiere in the main competition of the 78th Locarno Film Festival on 12 August 2025, where it was nominated for the Golden Leopard.

== Cast ==
- Mia Ferricelli as Linda
- Agnese Scazza as Azzurra
- Petra Scheggia as Marta
- Clara Tramontano as Eva
- Milutin Dapčević as Carlino
- Jessica Piccolo Valerani as the mother
- Cristina Donadio as the grandmother
- Matteo Martari as the father
- Evanghelina Zhurkina as Lenka
- Alessandro Gautiero as the husband
- Toni Pandolfo
- Tatiana Lepore
- Benjamin Israel
- Joshua Israel

== Production ==
Directors Valentina and Nicole Bertani co-wrote the screenplay with Maria Sole Limodio based on their childhood experiences. 600 girls were auditioned for the three lead roles. The film was shot in Emilia-Romagna, specifically in Ferrara, Castel Bolognese, and Cotignola. Filming also took place in Verona, Turin, and Ivrea.

== Release ==
Intramovies acquired the international sales rights to the film in July 2025. The film had its world premiere at the 78th Locarno Film Festival on 12 August 2025.

It competed in the International competition section of the 56th International Film Festival of India in November 2025. Following its festival run, the film was theatrically released in Italy on 11 June 2026 by Adler Entertainment.

== Awards and nominations ==
Award	Year	Category	Recipient(s)	Result
Locarno Film Festival	2025	Golden Leopard	Mosquitoes	Nominated
Locarno Film Festival	2025	Special Mention (Youth Jury)	Mosquitoes	Won
Thessaloniki International Film Festival	2025	Open Horizons	Mosquitoes	Official selection
International Film Festival of India	2025	Golden Peacock (International Competition)	Mosquitoes	Nominated
