= The Lake (2025 film) =

2025 Swiss drama film

- Festival poster
- French: Le Lac
- Directed by: Fabrice Aragno
- Screenplay by: Fabrice Aragno
- Produced by: Fabrice Aragno; Françoise Mayor
- Starring: Clotilde Courau; Bernard Stamm
- Cinematography: Joseph Areddy; Fabrice Aragno
- Edited by: Chloé Andreadaki; Fabrice Aragno
- Production companies: Casa Azul; (RTS) Radio Télévision Suisse
- Distributed by: Adok Films
- Release dates: 14 August 2025 (Locarno); 24 June 2026 (Switzerland)
- Running time: 75 minutes
- Country: Switzerland
- Language: French

The Lake (French: Le Lac) is a 2025 Swiss drama film written and directed by Fabrice Aragno. The film is about a couple, who with everything they have, throws themselves into a sailing race lasting several days and nights on a large lake.

The film had its world premiere at the 78th Locarno Film Festival on 14 August 2025, in the Main Competition section, where it competes for the Golden Leopard. It will be released in Switzerland on 24 June 2026 by Adok Films.

== Cast ==
- Clotilde Courau as Anna
- Bernard Stamm as Vincent

== Release ==
The Lake had its World Premiere at the 78th Locarno Film Festival on 14 August 2025, and competed for Golden Leopard.

On 17 October 2025, the film competed in the International Competition at the Doclisboa. and in New Directors Competition at the São Paulo International Film Festival and had screening on 16 October 2025.

On 28 October 2025, the film was showcased at the 38th Tokyo International Film Festival in 'World Focus' section.

It will be screened in Film Forward Special Screenings at the Thessaloniki International Film Festival on 1 November 2025.

== Accolades ==
Award	Date of ceremony	Category	Recipient	Result	Ref.
Locarno Film Festival	16 August 2025	Golden Leopard	The Lake	Nominated	
Locarno Film Festival	16 August 2025	Junior Jury Awards	The Lake	First Prize	
Locarno Film Festival	16 August 2025	Ecumenical Prize: Special Mention	The Lake	Won	
