= Film Socialisme =

2010 film by Jean-Luc Godard

- French theatrical release poster
- Directed by: Jean-Luc Godard
- Written by: Jean-Luc Godard
- Produced by: Alain Sarde
- Starring: Catherine Tanvier; Christian Sinniger
- Cinematography: Fabrice Aragno; Paul Grivas
- Music by: Thierry Machuel
- Production company: Vega Film
- Distributed by: Wild Bunch Distribution
- Release dates: 17 May 2010 (Cannes); 19 May 2010 (France)
- Running time: 102 minutes
- Country: France
- Language: French
- Box office: $410,000

Film Socialisme (alternative French title Socialisme; English: Socialism but often referred to as Film Socialism) is a 2010 French postmodern drama film directed by Jean-Luc Godard.

The film was first screened in the Un Certain Regard section at the 2010 Cannes Film Festival, to a widely varying reception, and released in France two days later, on 19 May 2010. It screened at the 48th New York Film Festival in 2010, the 27th film that Godard has shown at the festival.

== Plot ==
According to the synopsis on the film's official website, the film is composed of three movements:

- The first movement, Des choses comme ça ("Such things") is set on a cruise ship, featuring multi-lingual conversations among a motley collection of passengers. Characters include an aging war criminal, a former United Nations official, and a Russian detective. There is a brief cameo appearance by American singer-songwriter and artist Patti Smith.
- The second movement, Notre Europe ("Our Europe"), is set at a gas station and involves a pair of children, a girl and her younger brother, summoning their parents to appear before the "tribunal of their childhood", demanding serious answers on the themes of liberty, equality, and fraternity.
- The final movement, Nos humanités ("Our humanities"), visits six legendary sites: Egypt, Palestine, Odessa, Greece, Naples and Barcelona.

== Cast ==
- Catherine Tanvier: the mother
- Christian Sinniger: the father
- Jean-Marc Stehlé: Otto Golberg
- Nadège Beausson-Diagne: Constance
- Patti Smith: the singer guitarist
- Olga Riazanova: Russian secret agent
- Élisabeth Vitali: Journalist
- Eye Haïdara: Camerawoman
- Alain Badiou: The philosopher
- Robert Maloubier: The person in real life
- Agatha Couture: Mlle Alissa
- Maurice Sarfati
- Lenny Kaye
- Bernard Maris
- Elias Sanbar

== Production ==
Principal photography began in 2008, and the film was originally scheduled for a 10 January 2010 release, but an extended post-production delayed its release. Most of the film was shot around the Mediterranean Sea.

The film is Godard's first in HD video and the 16:9 aspect ratio, as well as his first in several decades not be photographed with an intended aspect ratio of 4:3. Though Godard was one of the first major directors to shoot and edit on video, and has incorporated video footage and editing into most of his work since the mid-1970s, this is the first theatrical release from him to be shot entirely in a digital format. As with many of his films, Godard's partner Anne-Marie Miéville worked on the film, other people credited as collaborators being Fabrice Aragno and Louma Sanbar, who also have worked with Godard before.

The cruise ship is the Costa Concordia, sailing around the Mediterranean Sea. This ship was wrecked in real life in January 2012.

The shooting aboard the cruise ship was documented in Film catastrophe by Paul Grivas.

== Critical response ==
Reviews for Film Socialisme were mixed. The review aggregator Rotten Tomatoes reports an approval rating of 58%, based on 59 reviews, with an average rating of 5.37/10. The website's consensus reads, "Godard continues to explore new modes of expression in Film Socialisme, an avant garde essay on societal decay that will resonate strongest among the already converted." Metacritic reported the film had an average score of 64 out of 100, based on 13 reviews.

Michael Phillips, film critic for the Chicago Tribune, gave the movie three stars out of four, writing, "Those receptive to Godard's sense of humor will find Film Socialisme an elusive yet expansive provocation. Those less receptive will find it elusive, period".

British film critic Mark Kermode attended the premiere screening at the 2010 Cannes Film Festival, describing it later as the worst film of the festival. Kermode would include Film Socialisme in his list of the worst ten films of 2011, as well as including it on his list of the 10 worst films released between 2008 and 2018.

Roger Ebert described the film as "an affront. It is incoherent, maddening, deliberately opaque and heedless of the ways in which people watch movies."

== Film festival screenings ==
Film Socialisme was screened at numerous film festivals around the world including,

- 2010 Cannes Film Festival - Un Certain Regard category
- 2010 Toronto International Film Festival - Masters category
- 2010 Melbourne International Film Festival
- 2011 International Film Festival Rotterdam
