= The Uniformed =

2025 German short drama film

- Promotional poster
- German: Die Uniformierten
- Directed by: Timon Ott
- Screenplay by: Timon Ott
- Produced by: Ricardo Guzmán Bausch; Timon Ott
- Starring: Soldiers of the German Armed Forces; Antonis Antoniadis
- Cinematography: Rafael Kuhn
- Edited by: Vladimir Vulević; Timon Ott
- Production company: Einbaum Film
- Distributed by: Gargantua Film Distribution
- Release date: 15 August 2025 (Locarno)
- Running time: 17 minutes
- Country: Germany
- Language: German

The Uniformed (German: Die Uniformierten) is a 2025 German short drama film written, directed and produced by Timon Ott. The film depicts military life of an 18-year-old, who commits to 17 years of military service, only to discover his unit is less uniform than expected.

The film had its world premiere in the Concorso Internazionale of the Pardi di Domani competition of the 78th Locarno Film Festival on 15 August 2025, where it was nominated for the Pardino d'Oro Arts3 Foundation for the Best International Short Film.

== Synopsis ==
At just 18, a young man begins a 17-year journey in the military. Once inside, he's confronted by harsh realities he never imagined. Many fellow soldiers falter, struggling with errors or lacking the strength and resilience required. The system, efficient and discreet, eliminates those who can't keep up from their rigorous routines. While the young man remains steadfast, his roommate and close friend, Frank, isn’t as fortunate. His continual shortcomings have finally caught up with him.

== Cast ==
- Soldiers of the German Armed Forces
- Antonis Antoniadis

== Release ==
The Uniformed had its World Premiere at the Concorso Internazionale portion of the Pardi di Domani competition of the 78th Locarno Film Festival on 15 August 2025, and competed for the Pardino d'Oro Arts3 Foundation for the Best International Short Film.

On 2 and 10 October 2025, the film screened in Modes 1 short film programme of 2025 Vancouver International Film Festival along with other 5 short films.

== Accolades ==
Award	Date of ceremony	Category	Recipient	Result	Ref.
Locarno Film Festival	16 August 2025	Pardino d'Oro Arts3 Foundation for the Best International Short Film	The Uniformed	Nominated	
