= Air Horse One =

2025 Swiss short documentary film

- Promotional poster
- Directed by: Lasse Linder
- Screenplay by: Lasse Linder
- Produced by: Philipp Ritler
- Cinematography: Robin Angst
- Edited by: Daniel Loepfe
- Music by: Moritz Widrig
- Production companies: Dynamic Frame; White Boat Pictures; SRF Schweizer Radio und Fernsehen
- Distributed by: Travelling distribution
- Release date: 8 August 2025 (Locarno)
- Running time: 21 minutes
- Countries: Switzerland; Belgium
- Language: English

Air Horse One is a 2025 Swiss-Belgian short documentary film, written and directed by Lasse Linder. The film is about Legacy, one of the most prized and celebrated fifteen-year-old mares in show jumping. It documents her journeys across the globe, traveling in the business class of equine air travel.

The film had its world premiere in the Concorso Nazionale of the Pardi di Domani competition of the 78th Locarno Film Festival on 8 August 2025, where it was nominated for the Pardino d’Oro SRG SSR for the Best Swiss Short Film.

== Synopsis ==
Air Horse One is a documentary following Legacy, a prized fifteen-year-old show jumping mare, as she travels between Florida, the Netherlands, and top global Grand Prix events. The film explores her training, international career, and the elite logistics of equine air travel. Legacy’s high-performance career takes her between her home stable in Ocala, Florida, her summer base in Weerselo, Netherlands.

== Release ==
Air Horse One had its World Premiere at the Concorso Nazionale portion of the Pardi di Domani competition of the 78th Locarno Film Festival on 8 August 2025, and competed for the Pardino d’Oro SRG SSR for the Best Swiss Short Film.

On 14 March 2026, it was screened at the 2026 South by Southwest Film & TV Festival in the Documentary Short Competition.

The film was screened on 8 June 2026 as part of the DocuDays UA International Human Rights Documentary Film Festival in Docu Short section.

== Accolades ==
| Award | Date of ceremony | Category | Recipient | Result | Ref. |
|---|---|---|---|---|---|
| Locarno Film Festival | 16 August 2025 | Pardino d’Oro SRG SSR for the Best Swiss Short Film | Air Horse One | Nominated | |
