= Lecce European Film Festival =

Film festival in Apulia, Italy

- Genre: film festival
- Frequency: Annual
- Venue: Multisala Massimo cinema
- Location: Lecce
- Country: Italy
- Website: https://www.festivaldelcinemaeuropeo.com/

The Lecce European Film Festival is an annual festival of European cinema held in Lecce, Italy.

== Description ==
The festival was established in 2000 aiming to promote dialogue between different European cultures and languages.

The Lecce European Film Festival is a member of the Association of Italian Film Festivals and collaborates with various cultural establishments, such as Centro Sperimentale di Cinematografia, Cineteca di Bologna, S.N.G.C.I., FIPRESCI, S.N.C.C.I., Centro Nazionale del Cortometraggio, Agiscuola, Università del Salento, etc. The festival has the patronage of the European Parliament.

Annually, for the main competition 10 feature films are selected by the festival's directors Alberto and Luigi La Monica. Apart from the main competition program, the festival hosts various events such as public talks, concerts and screenings, as well as thematic sections for short meter, documentaries, etc.

== Awards ==
Annually 10 features are selected for the Golden Olive-Cristina Soldano Prize for Best Film. The festival's list of prizes include SNGCI Prize for Best European Actor/Actress, RAI Cinema Channel Prize, Mario Verdone Prize, Unisalento Prize, FIPRESCI Prize, Cineuropa Prize, and some others.

== Editions ==
The inaugural edition of the festival took place in Corato, Apulia.

=== 2019 ===
The 20th anniversary edition of the festival took place on 8–13 April 2019. The prominent Russian director Alexander Sokurov became one of the main guests of the event. Sokurov's former student Alexander Zolotukhin presented his feature A Russian Youth. The jury, presided by Marco Müller, included Olena Yershova, Guillame Calop, Pippo Mezzapesa and Ana Urushadze.

=== 2020 ===
During the COVID-19 pandemic, the festival switched to an online format.

=== 2021 ===
The 22rd edition of the festival took place on 6–13 November 2021.

=== 2022 ===
The 23rd edition of the festival took place on 12–19 November 2022. The jury, presided by Pascal Diot, included Klaus Eder, Andriy Khalpakhchi, Marie-Pierre Vallé and Enrico Vannucci.

=== 2023 ===
The 24th edition of the festival took place on 11–18 November 2023. It was opened by Michael Winterbottom's Shoshana and wrapped with La chimera by Alice Rohrwacher.

=== 2024 ===
The 25th edition of the festival took place on 9-16 November, 2024. Peter Hoogendoorn's Three Days of Fish took the main prize.

=== 2025 ===
The 26th edition of the festival ran from 15 to 22 November, 2025. The Grand Prix was awarded to White Snail by Elsa Kremser and Levin Peter; Special Jury Prize — The Pupil by Karin Junger.

=== 2026 ===
The 27th edition of the festival is scheduled at 7-14 November, 2026.
