= White Snail =

2025 German-Austrian film

- Promotional poster
- Original title: Green Parrot
- Directed by: Elsa Kremser; Levin Peter
- Screenplay by: Elsa Kremser; Levin Peter
- Produced by: Lixi Frank; David Bohun; Elsa Kremser; Levin Peter
- Starring: Marya Imbro; Mikhail Senkov
- Cinematography: Mikhail Khursevich
- Edited by: Stephan Bechinger
- Music by: John Gürtler; Jan Miserre
- Production companies: Panama Film; RAUMZEITFILM (AT); Majade Fiktion (DE)
- Distributed by: Filmladen Verleih (Austria); Real Fiction Filmverleih (Germany)
- Release date: 8 August 2025 (Locarno)
- Running time: 115 minutes
- Countries: Germany; Austria
- Languages: Russian; Belarusian; English; Mandarin

White Snail is a 2025 German-Austrian romance film written and directed by Elsa Kremser, and Levin Peter. Starring Marya Imbro, and Mikhail Senkov, it follows Masha, a model pursuing her dream job in China, and Misha, a painter working in a morgue, in a fragile love story of two outsiders who turn each other's worlds upside down.

The film had its world premiere in the main competition of the 78th Locarno Film Festival on 8 August 2025, where it won the Special Jury Prize and the Pardo for Best Performance for Imbro and Senkov.

== Cast ==
- Marya Imbro as Masha
- Mikhail Senkov as Misha
- Olga Reptuh as Olga
- Andrei Sauchanka as Andrei

== Production ==
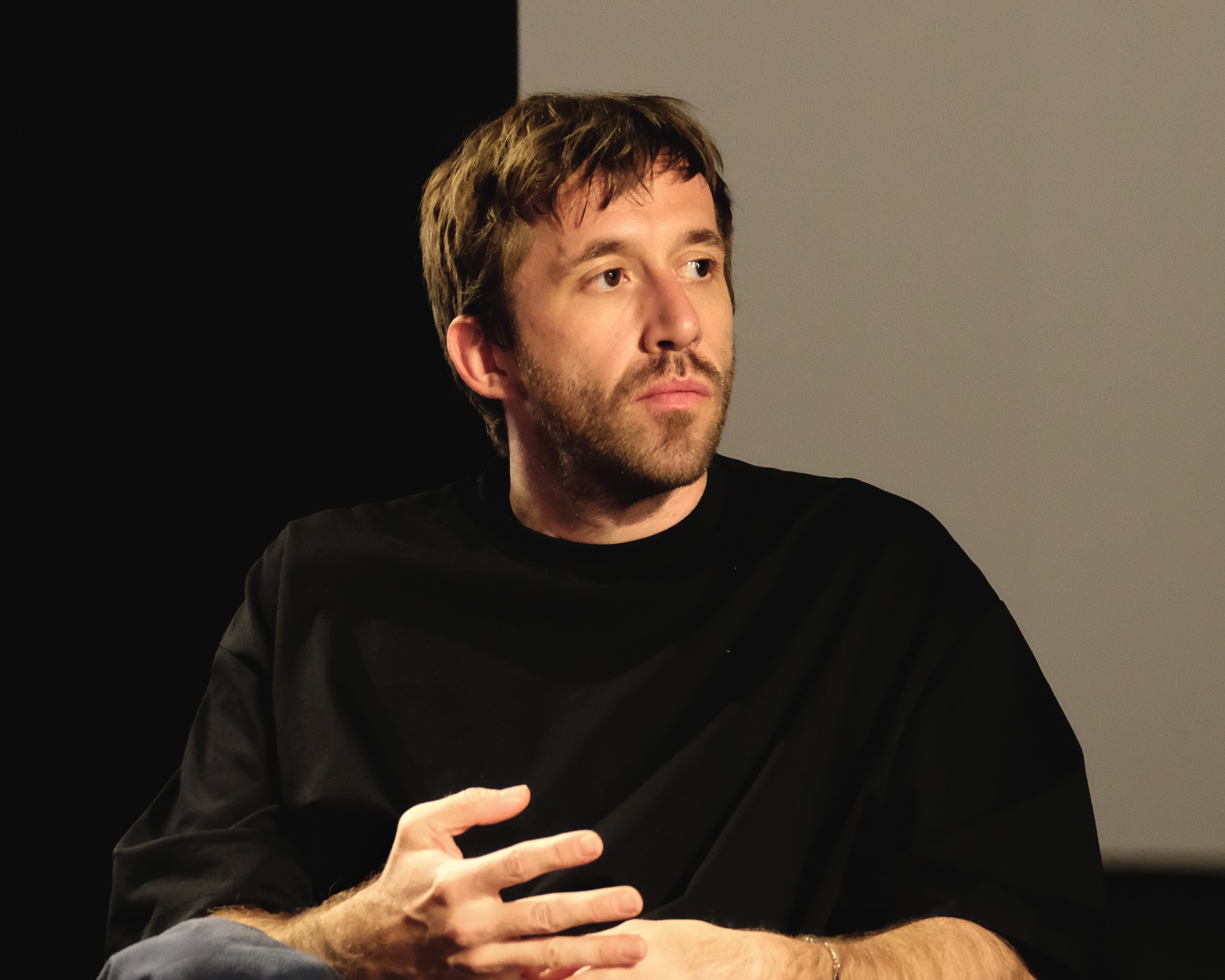
Levin Peter, director of the film

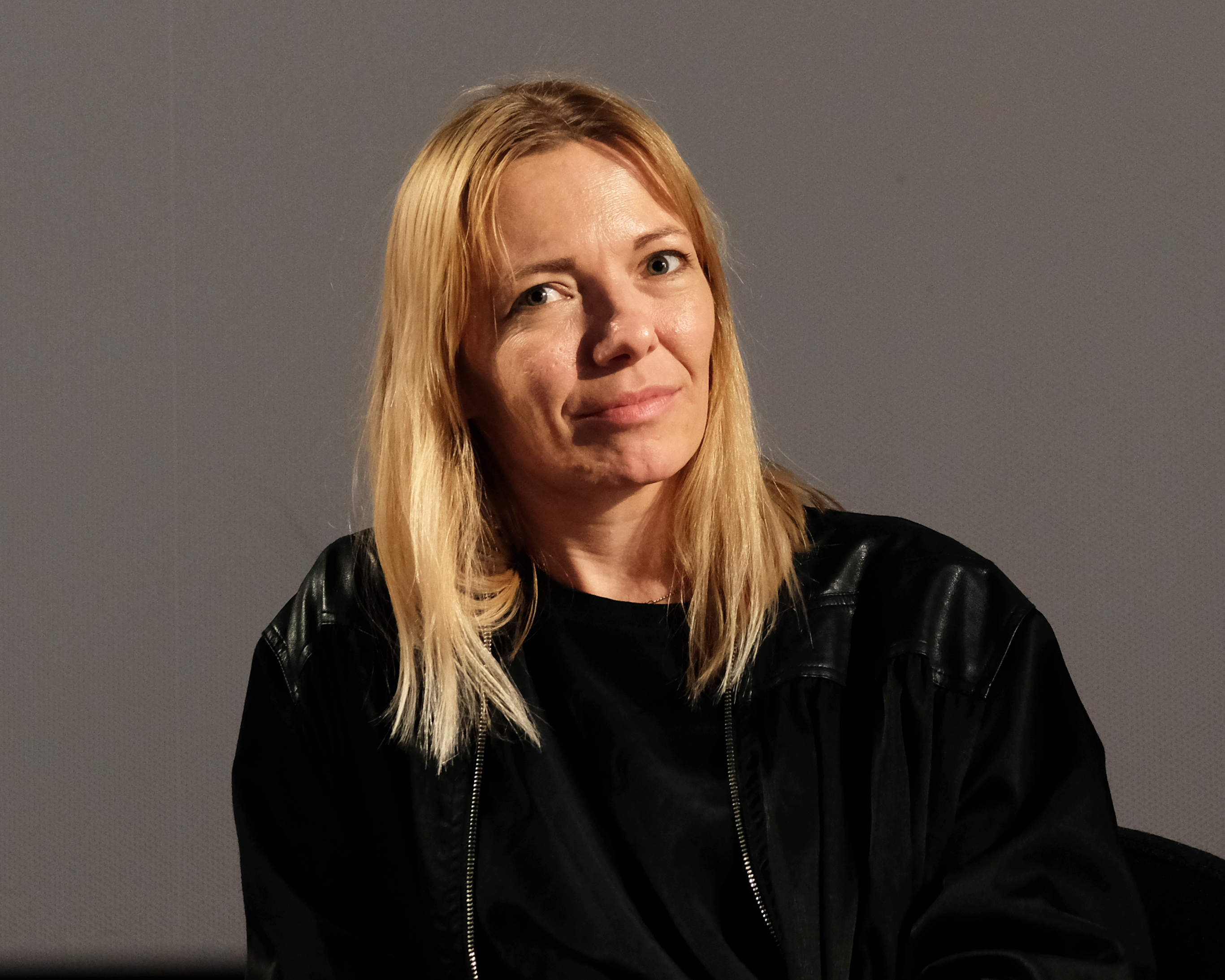
Elsa Kremser, director of the film

The film directed by Elsa Kremser and Levin Peter is inspired by real-life stories of non-professional actors, was shot in Belarus. It won the Perspektive Deutsches Kino – Kompagnon-Fellowship at the 67th Berlin International Film Festival in 2017 and participated at the TorinoFilmLab.

In 2021, it was selected at the TorinoFilmLab in the FeatureLab alongwith 9 other films.

In 2022, Eurimages supported the film (working title Green Parrot) with €300,000.

Principal photography began on 12 June 2023 on the location of Minsk in Belarus, and Daugavpils in Latvia. The filming ended on 15 September 2023.

== Release ==
White Snail had its World Premiere at the 78th Locarno Film Festival on 8 August 2025, and competed for Golden Leopard. A week later, it competed for Heart of Sarajevo award in the Competition Programme - Feature Film at the 31st Sarajevo Film Festival on 18 August 2025.

It was presented in Features at the Vienna International Film Festival on 19 October 2025.

It was presented in the 'Spotlight: Austria' at the 29th Tallinn Black Nights Film Festival on 7 November 2025, and also in 'From The Festivals - 2025' section of the 56th International Film Festival of India in November 2025. It competed in Golden Olive tree Competition at the Lecce European Film Festival on 21 November 2025.

Rome-based Intramovies acquired the world sales rights to the film in July.

== Accolades ==
Award	Date of ceremony	Category	Recipient	Result	Ref.
Berlin International Film Festival	18 February 2017	Kompagnon-Fellowship – Perspektive Deutsches Kino	Levin Peter and Elsa Kremser for White Snail	Won	
Locarno Film Festival	16 August 2025	Golden Leopard	White Snail	Nominated	
Locarno Film Festival	16 August 2025	Special Jury Prize	White Snail	Won	
Locarno Film Festival	16 August 2025	Pardo for Best Performance	Marya Imbro	Won	
Locarno Film Festival	16 August 2025	Pardo for Best Performance	Mikhail Senkov	Won	
Sarajevo Film Festival	22 August 2025	Heart of Sarajevo	White Snail	Nominated	
Sarajevo Film Festival	22 August 2025	CICAE (International Confederation of Art Cinemas) Award	White Snail	Won	
Vienna International Film Festival	28 October 2025	Erste Bank MehrWERT Award	White Snail	Won	
Lecce European Film Festival	23 November 2025	Golden Olive – Cristina Soldano Award for Best Film	White Snail	Won	
