= She (2025 film) =

2025 documentary about Vietnamese factory workers

- Promotional poster
- Directed by: Parsifal Reparato
- Screenplay by: Emma Ferulano, Michela Cerimele; Parsifal Reparato
- Produced by: Parsifal Reparato; Quentin Laurent; Pier Francesco Aiello; Emma Ferulano
- Starring: Tứ Thị Trương; Thư Thị Hoài Triệu; Mai Hiên
- Cinematography: Lorenzo Casadio Vannucci; Parsifal Reparato
- Edited by: Alice Roffinengo; Armando Duccio Ventriglia
- Music by: François Giesberger
- Production companies: AnthropicA; PFA Films
- Distributed by: CAT&Docs
- Release date: 9 August 2025 (Locarno)
- Running time: 75 minutes
- Countries: France; Italy
- Language: Vietnamese

She is a 2025 feature documentary film about Vietnamese women factory workers. It is an Italian-French co-production, directed by Parsifal Reparato, and had its world premiere at the 78th Locarno Film Festival in Switzerland on 9 August 2025.

== Synopsis ==
She shows the working conditions of women working at one of the world's largest electronic component factories in Vietnam, located in Bắc Ninh province. There are 80,000 workers at the factory, of whom around 80 per cent are women who have agreed to work 12-hour shifts, 24/7.

Shots alternate between the factory site and workers' homes and surrounding businesses, and contrasts men's experience of work at the factory.

== Cast ==
- Tứ Thị Trương
- Thư Thị Hoài Triệu
- Mai Hiên

== Production ==
She is directed by Italian filmmaker, journalist, and anthropologist Parsifal Reparato, who also co-produces, co-writes, and was responsible for some of the cinematography. He first visited Vietnam in 2012, and started making the film in late 2020, when the COVID-19 pandemic led to his intended short visit to the country extending for six months.

Other producers are Emma Ferulano and Quentin Laurent. Reparato and Ferulano are co-writers, along with Michela Cerimele. Lorenzo Casadio joined the project as cinematographer during the final trip, after the structure of the narrative framework had been worked out and much of the filming done. Casadio was mostly responsible for filming the studio re-enactments of the women working (as filming was not permitted inside the factory).

Alice Roffinengo and Armando Duccio Ventriglia edited the film, and the score is by François Giesberger. Art direction was by Trường Xuân Đặng.

She was made through AntropicA (Italy), Les Films de l'œil sauvage (France), PFA Films (Italy), and Luce Cinecittà (Italy).

Reparato uses several styles of documentary storytelling, including observation, interviews, and re-creations, in which the workers who had agreed to participate recreated their work shifts in the studio.

The film is 75 minutes long.

== Themes ==
The film has global application, "questioning the very structure of the global economy".

Reparato had previously made another documentary film about women workers, called Nimble Fingers, and hopes to make a third to complete a trilogy, "to tell the story of how the corporations work worldwide... I hope to show how they exploit [workers] from the US to Vietnam, from Japan to Korea".

== Release ==
She had its world premiere on 9 August 2025 in Critics' Week (Semaine de la Critique) at Locarno Film Festival in Switzerland. Ahead of its Locarno premiere, the film was guaranteed international distribution in cinemas in London, New York City, Toronto, and Florence, being the recipient of a DocXChange award, part of Visioni Incontra. International sales are handled by CAT&Docs.

She had its Australian premiere at the Adelaide Film Festival, in Adelaide, South Australia, on 19 October 2025.

== Reception ==
Amel Skalonja, writing about the film in InDaily, wrote: "She doesn't just observe factory labour, however. It reveals the humanity beneath it, exposing a system that is built on erasing female identities. Hauntingly intimate, yet humanising, She is a film that lingers..."

== Accolades ==
She won the Adelaide Film Festival Feature Documentary Award. The jury's citation said: "Through a lens both covert and compassionate, director Parsifal Reparato crafts a documentary of startling intimacy. Despite the physical and emotional distances these women endure, their inner lives—marked by longing, resistance, and resilience—emerge with quiet power. Reparato's restrained yet expressive visual style allows his subjects’ stories to unfold with dignity, transforming their testimonies into acts of subtle defiance against systemic erasure".
