= Minh Quý Trương =

Vietnamese film director (born 1990)

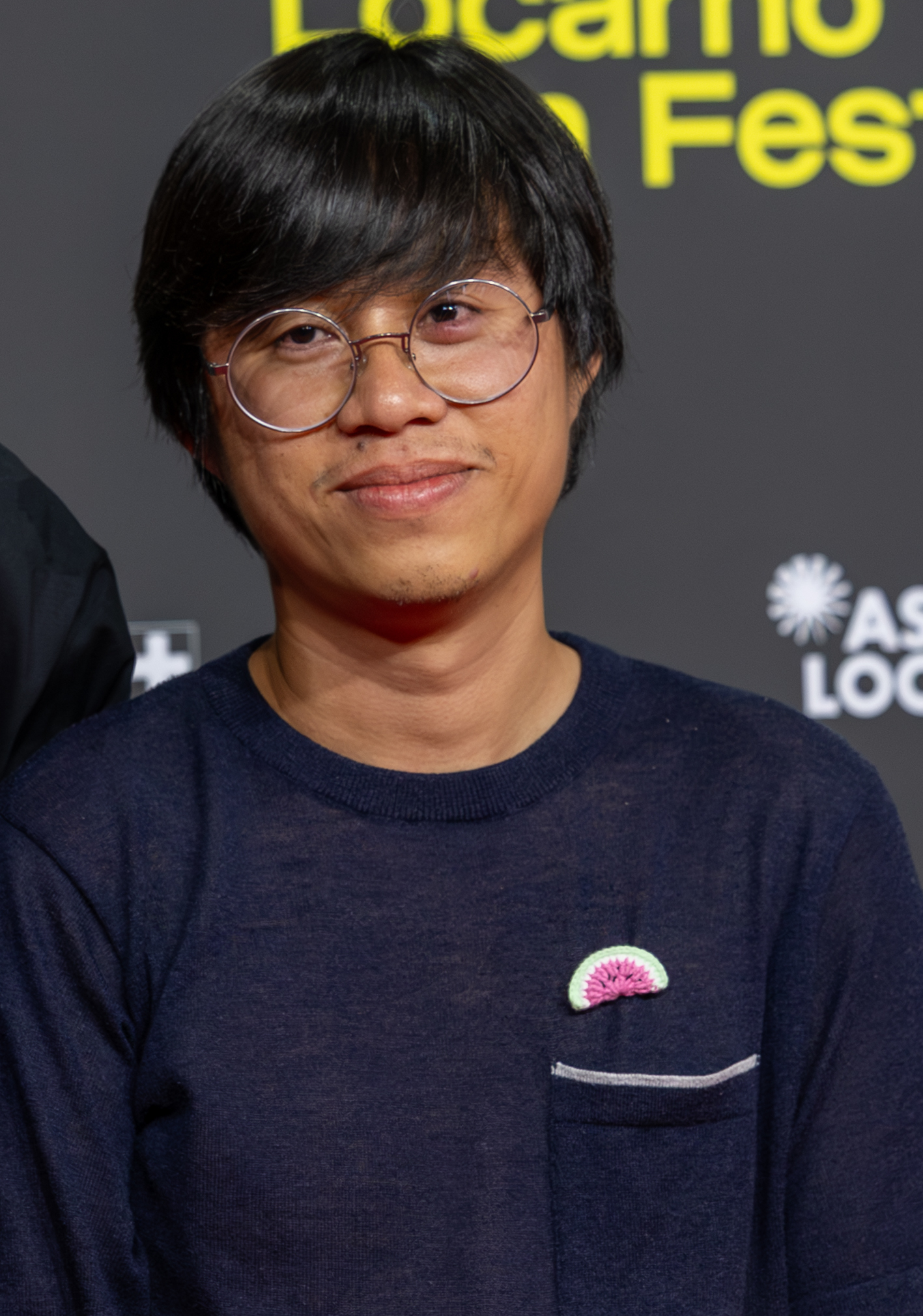
- Minh Quý Trương in 2025
- Born: 1990 (age 34–35); Buôn Ma Thuột, Vietnam

Minh Quý Trương (born 1990) is a Vietnamese filmmaker.

== Early life and education ==
Trương was raised in Buôn Ma Thuột. He attended film school, but dropped out in 2008 to pursue independent filmmaking. He later participated in the Asian Film Academy and the Berlinale Talents program.

== Career ==
After directing the short films Déjà Vu and How Green Was the Calabash Garden, Trương's first feature-length project, the documentary The City of Mirrors: A Fictional Biography was released in 2016. This was followed by The Tree House, which debuted at the 2019 Locarno Film Festival.

In 2021, Trương's short film Les Attendants premiered at the Berlinale Shorts competition. The project was completed in preparation for his feature Viêt and Nam, which debuted in the Un Certain Regard portion of the 2024 Cannes Film Festival.

== Filmography ==
Year	Title	Notes	Ref.
2014	Déjà Vu	Short film	
2016	How Green Was the Calabash Garden	Short film	
2016	The City of Mirrors: A Fictional Biography	—	
2019	The Tree House	—	
2021	Les Attendants	Short film	
2024	Viêt and Nam	—	
2025	Hair, Paper, Water... (Tóc, Giấy và Nước)	Golden Leopard – Filmmakers of the Present winner	

== Awards and nominations ==
Year	Award	Category	Nominated work	Results	Ref.
2024	Cannes Film Festival	Un Certain Regard	Viêt and Nam	Nominated	
2024	Cannes Film Festival	Queer Palm	Viêt and Nam	Nominated	
2024	Sydney Film Festival	Sydney Film Prize	Viêt and Nam	Nominated	
