= Berlinale Talents =

Talent development programme of the Berlin International Film Festival

Berlinale Talents, formerly Berlinale Talent Campus, is the talent development programme of the Berlin International Film Festival (also called Berlinale). An annual summit and networking platform for 200 outstanding creatives from the fields of film and drama series, the events take place in February during the festival. Berlinale Talents is organized and directed by Tobias Pausinger as programme manager and Nikola Joetze as project manager.

== History ==
The initiative was founded in 2003 after the director of the Berlin International Film Festival Dieter Kosslick announced his plans to create a platform to support the next generation of filmmakers within the festival. Previously named Berlinale Talent Campus, the new title Berlinale Talents has been in place since October 2013. In October 2022, it was announced that Berlinale Talents, along with the European Film Market, Berlinale Co-Production Market and World Cinema Fund, will be pooled under the label Berlinale Pro* while retaining their individual profiles. The corresponding slogan captures the reality of the events: Where Cinema Culture and Industry Meet. It was also confirmed that the Berlinale and Berlinale Talents would take place in person in 2023.

== Description ==
Berlinale Talents is a forum for film professionals and cinema lovers, featuring public talks, discipline-specific workshops, networking events, the Berlinale Talents Lab for project development and the Talent Project Market for projects seeking co-production and financing. There are over 15 creative disciplines within filmmaking covered.

The event is supported and funded by the Minister of State for Culture and the Media, Creative Europe - MEDIA programme of the European Union and Medienboard Berlin-Brandenburg, along with the Federal Foreign Office and Goethe-Institut, who have supported it since its establishment.

As of 2024, there is an alumni community of over 10,000, including those from the seven Talents International initiatives around the world.

== Participants ==
Each year up over 3000 filmmakers from approximately 130 countries apply to the programme. An international committee selects 200 talents, inviting them to Berlin. Berlinale Talents supports the participants, who are generally in the first ten years of their career, in positioning themselves in the filmmaking industry. With experts and renowned filmmakers they can then discuss innovations and trends in the business, develop their own projects in the project labs and present them to a diverse festival public.

The Berlinale Talents alumni community has over 10,000 participants, their profiles can be found on the website.

The programme also keeps track of their alumni's work, involving their attendance at festivals, award ceremonies or alumni interviews on current film projects that deal with relevant topics such as sustainability and climate change. Information is regularly updated in the alumni network.

== The Programme ==
Participants are automatically assigned to a discipline-specific workshop once accepted, and can also choose from a wide range of Summit events to attend, many of which are open to the public. There are also many networking events during the week.

The Summit programme of Berlinale Talents offers a range of master classes and interactive panel discussions. The sessions focus on an annually changing topic featuring a variety of formats and set-ups: In the ‘grand format’ sessions experts of international reputation give insights into their work. During the mid-scale ‘atelier’ sessions experienced filmmakers and the audience are invited to enter into a dialogue with industry professionals.

=== Project Development Labs ===
There are two spaces for project development at Berlinale Talents:

- The Berlinale Talents Lab is open to filmmakers who have previously taken part in the Berlinale Talents Summit in Berlin, and the focus is on projects in advanced development, with a strong narrative vision and clear concept.
- The Talent Project Market offers alumni producers the chance to present their projects at the Berlinale Co-Production Market and to get in contact with producers, financiers, distributors and sales agents. The ten selected projects also compete for the VFF Talent Highlight Award, three of which are pitched to industry guests at the Berlinale Co-Production Market. The winner receives EUR 10,000 and the two runners-up EUR 1,000 each.

=== Workshops ===
There are a number of studio-based workshops, including:

- Camera Workshop
- Editing Workshop
- World Building Workshop
- Sound Workshop
- Acting Workshop
- Market Workshop, which uses case studies and connects to the European Film Market

=== Talent Press ===
Talent Press, an initiative of Berlinale Talents in collaboration with FIPRESCI and the Goethe-Institut, is a platform for young film critics and journalists from around the world to acquaint themselves with current trends in world cinema and to review films and events throughout the entire festival. Under the tutelage of prominent film critics they share their impressions and insights through their articles for the Berlinale Talents website and those of its partners - FIPRESCI and Goethe-Institut.

== Berlinale Talents Mastercard Enablement Programme ==
Dedicated to doing well by doing good, the Berlinale Talents Mastercard Enablement Programme provides three selected fellows with mentoring, financial support and public awareness for their film-related initiatives, networks or platforms that contribute to their local communities in an inclusive and impactful way. The programme is open to Berlinale Talents alumni and also those from the seven Talents International initiatives, who can apply with a film-related social initiative in one of four key domains: gender equality and diversity; education and work; peace, justice and understanding; or environmental awareness and climate action.

== Kompagnon fellowship ==
From 2017 until 2024, the Berlinale Talents and Perspektive Deutsches Kino joined forces to award the Kompagnon fellowship. The fellowship is awarded annually to two directors or screenwriters residing in Germany to support their artistic and professional development.

Directors and screenwriters of short or feature films who were part of the previous edition of Perspektive Deutsches Kino, as well as permanent residents of Germany who will participate in the Script Station, Doc Station or Short Film Station at the upcoming edition of Berlinale Talents, are eligible to apply. In addition to a stipend of 5,000 Euros (2,500 Euros for short films) for development of a screenplay or project, the Kompagnon also provides a mentoring programme, professional coaching and networking opportunities.

Kompagnon fellows have included:

- 2024: Vladimir Beck, The Shore, (Berlinale Talents 2024) and Tizian Stromp Zargari, Traversée (Perspektive Deutsches Kino 2023)
- 2023: Anna Melikova, My Beloved Man's Female Body (Berlinale Talents 2023) and Mareike Wegener, Paraphrase on the Finding of a Glove (Perspektive Deutsches Kino 2022).
- 2022: Payal Sethi, Kurinji, Script Station 2022 & Jonas Bak, She Makes and Unmakes, Perspektive Deutsches Kino.
- 2021: Jonas Matauschek, Wir waren Kumpel (Once We Were Pitmen), Doc Station 2021, & Eliza Petkova, Der Arbeiter (The Worker), Perspektive Deutsches Kino.
- 2020: Ian Purnell, Arctic Link, Doc Station 2020 & Hristiana Raykova, 111, Perspektive Deutsches Kino.
- 2019: Ana-Felicia Scutelnicu, Transit Times, Script Station 2019 & Julian Pörksen, Be Continued, Perspektive Deutsches Kino.
- 2018: Jide Tom Akinleminu, When a Farm Goes Aflame, the Flakes Fly Home to Bear the Tale, Doc Station 2018 & Julian Radlmaier, Blutsauger, Perspektive Deutsches Kino.
- 2017: Nora Fingscheidt, Systemsprenger (System Crasher), Script Station 2017 & Levin Peter and Elsa Kremser, White Snail, Perspektive Deutsches Kino.

== International ==
The Talents International editions, Talents Beirut in Lebanon, Talents Buenos Aires in Argentina, Talents Guadalajara in Mexico, Talents Durban in South Africa, Talents Sarajevo in Bosnia-Herzegovina and Talents Tokyo in Japan have similar structure and purpose to the Berlin-based counterpart, while keeping a regional perspective and finding support and amenities in a locally-based international film festival or film school. International Talents initiatives are supported by local partners as well as by the Goethe-Institut.

== Past themes ==
The themes of Berlinale Talents in past years include:

- 2025: Listen Courageously: Cinematic Narratives in Times of Dissonance
- 2024: "Common Tongues - Speaking Out in the Language of Cinema"
- 2023: "You Must Be Joking - Humour in Serious Times"
- 2022: "Labours of Cinema"
- 2021: "Dreams"
- 2020: "Collectives"
- 2019: "Mistakes – How to Fail Better"
- 2018: "Secrets"
- 2017: "Courage: Against All Odds"
- 2016: "The Nature of Relations"
- 2015: "2015: A Space Discovery"
- 2014: "Ready to Play? – Breaking the Rules"
- 2013: "Some Like It Hot – Filmmakers as Entertainers"
- 2012: "Changing Perspectives"
- 2011: "Framespotting – Filmmakers Positioning Themselves"
- 2010: "Cinema Needs Talent: Looking for the Right People"
- 2009: "Suddenly it all happened – The Turning Point in Close-up"
- 2008: "Screening Emotions – Cinema's Finest Asset"
- 2007: "Home Affairs – Privacy, Films and Politics"
- 2006: "At the Cutting Edge of Making Movies"
- 2005: "Designing Your Future"
- 2004: "Let's Get Passionate About Film!"
- 2003: "You Always Remember the First Time"

== Past awards ==
A number of awards have been discontinued.

=== Film Prize of the Robert Bosch Stiftung ===
The Film Prize of the Robert Bosch Stiftung for International Cooperation was a competition and year-long training programme offering tailor made workshops to young emerging talents from Germany and the Arab world to realise a joint film project. Three prizes, each worth up to 60,000 euros, were awarded each year. The last edition of the Film Prize of the Robert Bosch Stiftung was in 2021 which, due to the COVID-19 pandemic, was presented as an online training programme. Eight German-Arab film teams were nominated and invited to a series of online trainings to further develop their projects, their dossiers and prepare their pitch in front of the Film Prize Jury. Each nominated team received a Development Prize of 10,000 euros. Finally, two teams won an additional Best Pitch Award, each endowed with 10,000 euros. The two winning teams were revealed at the Good Bye, Film Prize! online event on 3 March 2021.

Winners

Past winners include:

2021:

- Best Pitch - Documentary - The Missing Planet | Germany/Egypt. Directors: Marouan Omara & Tom Rosenberg, Producers: Michael Henrichs & Mark Lotfy
- Best Pitch - Short Fiction - Nobody Wants the Night | Germany/Lebanon. Director: Remi Itani, Producers: Janina Sara Hennemann, Aya Nabulsi

2020:

- Documentary - Big Boys Don't Cry | Director: Muhammad Mustapha (Egypt), Producer: Philipp Maurice Raube (Germany), Co-Producer: Hala Lotfy (Egypt)
- Short Fiction Film - Inana | Director: Ragda Alazizi (Syria), Producer: Philipp Döring (Germany), Co-Producer: Ragda Alazizi (Syria)
- Animation - Traitors of the Eyes | Director: Abdelrahman Dnewar (Egypt), Saad Dnewar (Egypt), Producer: Georg Neubert (Germany), Co-Producer: Saad Dnewar (Egypt)

2019:

- Short Fiction Film - Homeless Hearts | Director: Mohamed Sabbah (Lebanon), Producers: Bastian Klügel (Germany), Ghina El-Hachem (Lebanon)
- Documentary - Do You Love Me | Director: Lana Daher (Lebanon), Producers: Jasper Mielke (Germany), Lana Daher (Lebanon)
- Documentary - Abo Zabaal 1989 | Director: Bassam Mortada (Egypt), Producers: Anna Bolster (Germany), Kesmat Elsayed (Egypt)

2018:

- Short Fiction Film - Maradona's Legs | Director: Firas Khoury (Palestine), Producers: Zorana Musikic (Germany), May Odeh (Palestine)
- Documentary - Purple Sea | Directors: Amel Alzakout, Khaled Abdulwahed (Syria), Producers: Ines Meier (Germany), Khaled Abdulwahed (Syria)
- Animation - How My Grandmother Became a Chair | Director: Nicolas Fattouh (Lebanon), Producers: Fabian Driehorst (Germany), Nermine Haddad (Lebanon)

2017:

- Short Fiction Film - Fakh / The Trap | Director: Nada Riyadh (Egypt), Producers: Ayman El Amir (Egypt), Eva Schellenbeck (Germany)
- Documentary - Behind Closed Doors | Director: Yakout Elhababi (Morocco), Producers: Karoline Henkel (Germany), Hind Saih (Morocco)
- Animation - Night | Director: Ahmad Saleh (Jordan), Producers: Jessica Neubauer (Germany), Saleh Saleh (Jordan)

2016:

- Short Fiction Film - Tshweesh | Director: Feyrouz Serhal (Lebanon), Producers: Stefan Gierenr (Germany), Lara Abou Saifan (Lebanon), Felipe Lage Coro (Spain)
- Documentary - Miguel's War | Director: Eliane Raheb (Lebanon), Producers: Eliane Raheb (Lebanon), Margot Haiböck, Lissi Muschol (Germany)
- Animation - Four Acts for Syria | Director: Waref Abu Quba, Kevork Mourad (Syria), Producers: Eva Illmer (Germany), Waref Abu Quba (Syria)

2015:

- Short Fiction Film - The Parrot | Director: Amjad Al Rasheed, Darin Sallam (Jordan), Producers: Roman Roitman (Germany), Deema Azar (Jordan)
- Documentary - Amal | Director: Mohamed Siam (Egypt), Producers: Myriam Sassine (Libanon), Mohamed Siam (Egypt), Co-Producers: Arnaud Dommerc (France), Sara Bökemeyer (Germany), Patricia Drati (Denmark), Ingrid Lill Høgtun (Norway)

2014:

- Short Fiction Film - Dry Hot Summers (Har .. Gaf .. Sayfan) | Director: Sherif Elbendary (Egypt), Producers: Claudia Jubeh (Germany), Hossam Elouan (Egypt)
- Documentary - Possessed by Djinn | Director: Dalia Al-Kury (Jordan), Producers: Lino Rettinger (Germany), Dalia Al-Kury (Jordan)
- Animation - Manivelle - Last Days of the Man of Tomorrow | Director: Fadi Baki (Lebanon), Producers: Niklas Hlawatsch (Germany), Bernadette Klausberger (Germany), Jinane Dagher (Lebanon), Sabine Sidawi (Lebanon)

2013:

- Short Fiction Film - Ave Maria | Director: Basil Khalil (Palestine), Producers: Eric Dupont, Eric Fantone (France), Helge Albers (Germany)
- Short Fiction Film - Free Range | Director: Bassem Breish (Lebanon), Producers: Jacques Colman (Germany), Katia Saleh (Lebanon)
- Documentary - Gaza Surf Club | Director: Philip Gnadt (Germany), Producers: Michael Dupke (Germany), Stephanie Yamine (Egypt)

=== Berlin Today Award ===
The Berlin Today Award was a short film competition open to current and former participants of the Berlinale Talent Campus. To enter the competition, filmmakers had to submit an idea for a short film project. Five of these projects got selected and were realised with the support of German production companies and the Medienboard Berlin-Brandenburg. These films were then premiered at the opening of the next Berlinale Talent Campus, with one of them additionally being awarded with the Berlin Today Award. The last edition of the Berlin Today Award took place in 2012.

Winners included:

- 2012: Batman and the Checkpoint (Director: Rafael Balulu)
- 2011: Hackney Lullabies (Director: Kyoko Miyake)
- 2010: Jonah and the vicarious nature of homesickness with Jens Winter (Director: Bryn Chainey)
- 2009: Wagah (Director: Supriyo Sen)
- 2008: Match Factor with Anneke Kim Sarnau, Navíd Akhavan und Sebastian Schwarz (Director: Maheen Zia)
- 2007: Wasserschlacht — The Great Border Battle (Director: Katarzyna Klimkiewicz & Andrew Friedman)
- 2006: BerlinBall (Director: Anna Azevedo)
- 2005: Alright Love (Director: Samuli Valkama & Roman Sorger) and București—Berlin (Director: Anca M. Lăzărescu & Cristian Mungiu)
- 2004: Berlinbeirut (Director: Myrna Maakaron), Best of the Wurst (Director: Grace Lee) and Berlin Backstage (Director: Stéphanie Chuat & Véronique Reymond)

=== Score Competition ===
Winners:

- 2012: Christoph Fleischmann
- 2011: Felix Rösch
- 2010: Camilo Sanabria
- 2009: Atanas Valkov
- 2008: Conrad Oleak
- 2007: Ilja Coric
- 2006: Alasdair Reid
- 2005: Ognjan Milosevic
- 2004: Tom Third

=== Garage Studio ===
2008

- E.D.D.I. (Director and screenwriter: Victoria Hayford)
- The String Puppet (Director and screenwriter: Alexander Frank)
- It Could Happen To You (Director and screenwriter: Juliane Block)
- On Time (Screenwriter: David Bradley Halls, Director: Ted Chung)

2007

- Resigned (Director and screenwriter: Tamara Maloney)
- One of These Days (Director and screenwriter: Sadaf Ahmadi)
- Click-Clack-Clack (Director and screenwriter: Amira Lopez)
- The Discreet Charms of the Refugee (Director and screenwriter: Colm Quinn)

=== Talent Movie of the Week ===
- 2006: High Maintenance (Director: Philipp Van)
- 2005: Cataract with Andreas Schmidt and Sesede Terziyan (Director: Sainath Choudhury)
- 2004: Funeral Etiquette (Director: Martin Romanella)
- 2003: Dangle (Director: Phil Traill)
