= Dry Leaf =

2025 Georgian road movie by Alexandre Koberidze

- International promotional poster
- Georgian: ხმელი ფოთოლი
- Directed by: Alexandre Koberidze
- Screenplay by: Alexandre Koberidze
- Produced by: Mariam Shatberashvili; Luise Hauschild; Alexandre Koberidze
- Starring: David Koberidze; Otar Nijaradze
- Cinematography: Alexandre Koberidze
- Edited by: Alexandre Koberidze
- Music by: Giorgi Koberidze
- Production company: New Matter Films
- Distributed by: Heretic (Germany)
- Release date: 13 August 2025 (Locarno)
- Running time: 186 minutes
- Countries: Germany; Georgia
- Language: Georgian

Dry Leaf (Georgian: ხმელი ფოთოლი) is a 2025 experimental road movie produced, written and directed by Alexandre Koberidze, starring his father David Koberidze as Irakli, it follows a father searching his missing daughter across rural Georgia.

The film had its world premiere in the main competition of the 78th Locarno Film Festival on 13 August 2025, where it won the Special Mention prize.

It is Koberidze's second film shot in digital 144p low resolution following Let the Summer Never Come Again (2017).

== Plot ==
When Lisa, a young photographer, disappears, her father decides to search for her. He sets off on a journey through Georgia with her best friend Levani, an invisible person, as Lisa had recently been photographing football stadiums across the country. As the landscape passes by and they travel from one football stadium to the next, the people and their stories change, and with each football pitch and village, the chances of finding Lisa diminish.

== Cast ==
- David Koberidze as Irakli
- Otar Nijaradze as Levani
- Irina Chelidze as Nino
- Giorgi Bochorishvili as Policeman
- Vakhtang Fanchulidze as Policeman

== Production ==
"Dry Leaf" is the English translation of a football pass coined in the 1950s by two-time World Cup winner Brazilian player Didi (Portuguese: folha seca). Football is a recurrent motif during the film, as David Koberidze character searches his daughter through rural Georgia. The Brazilian national football team is also known for being wildly embraced by underdeveloped countries around the world.

It was completely filmed using his personal Sony Ericsson W595, which was also used during the production of his first feature film Let the Summer Never Come Again (2017). Its low-resolution (144p), gives the "natural visual" the filmmaker aimed.

Alongside casting his father in the lead role, Koberidze's brother Giorgi Koberidze composed the film score and oversaw the sound design.

By May 2025, it was reported that film was in the final stages of post-production.

== Release ==
Dry Leaf had its World Premiere at the main competition of the 78th Locarno Film Festival on 13 August 2025, where it competed for Golden Leopard.

The film had its North American premiere at Wavelengths section of the 2025 Toronto International Film Festival on 7 September. It was also screened at the Currents Selections of the 2025 New York Film Festival in October.

It was presented at the World Cinema section at the 30th Busan International Film Festival on 18 September 2025. It was also screened on 5 October 2025 at the Bangkok International Film Festival in the Main Competition, and at 'Strands: Dare' section of the 2025 BFI London Film Festival on 11 October 2025.

It was screened in the Snapshots section of the 61st Chicago International Film Festival on 17 October 2025, and in Features at the Vienna International Film Festival on the same day, and the next day in International Perspective at the São Paulo International Film Festival on 18 October 2025.

It will be screened in Survey Expanded: Fragilities at the Thessaloniki International Film Festival on 7 November 2025, and had its Singapore Premiere in the Undercurrent section of the 36th Singapore International Film Festival on 29 November 2025.

It was presented in the 'Best of Festivals' at the 29th Tallinn Black Nights Film Festival on 15 November 2025.

On 8 August 2026, it was screened in the Melbourne International Film Festival in Experimentations Strand for its Victorian Premiere.

== Reception ==
On review aggregator website Rotten Tomatoes, the film holds an approval rating of 82% based on 17 reviews, with an average rating of 7.0/10.

== Accolades ==
Award	Date of ceremony	Category	Recipient	Result	Ref.
Locarno Film Festival	16 August 2025	Golden Leopard	Dry Leaf	Nominated	
Locarno Film Festival	16 August 2025	Special Mention	Dry Leaf	Won	
Bangkok International Film Festival	15 October 2025	Grand Prix	Dry Leaf	Won	
Golden Apricot Yerevan International Film Festival	19 July 2026	Regional Panorama: Silver Apricot	Dry Leaf	Won	
Golden Apricot Yerevan International Film Festival	19 July 2026	FIPRESCI Award	Dry Leaf	Won	
New Horizons Film Festival	2 August 2026	Main Competition: Grand Prix	Dry Leaf	Won	
