= Jean-Stéphane Bron =

Swiss actor and film director

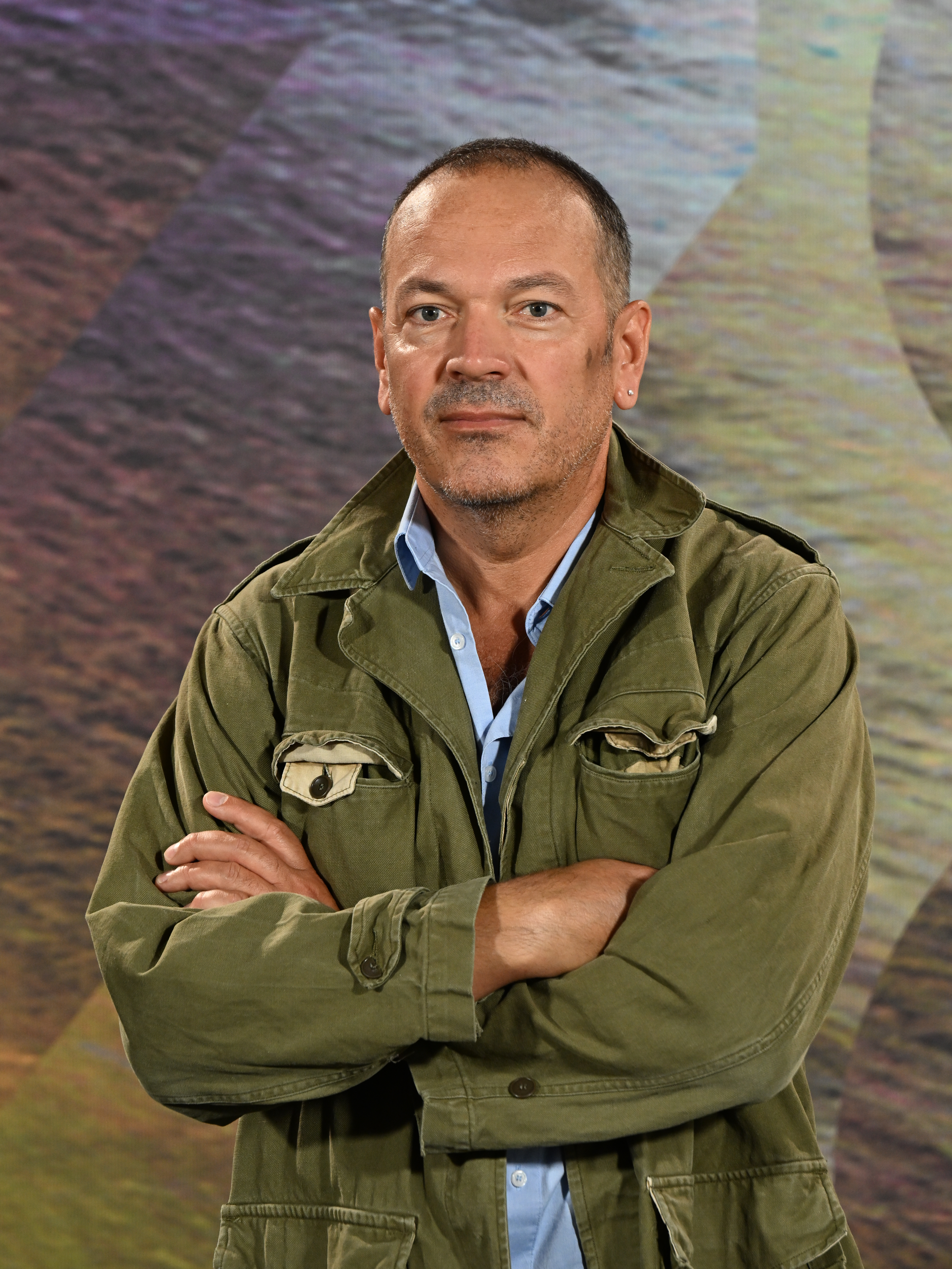
At the Locarno Film Festival, 11 August 2025

Jean-Stéphane Bron (born 1969) is a Swiss film director.

== Biography ==
Jean-Stéphane Bron was born in 1969 in Lausanne. He attended and graduated from the École cantonale d'art de Lausanne (ECAL). After Known to Our Departments and The Way I Look at You, he directed for his first theatrical release Corn in Parliament, among the biggest hits in Swiss cinema. His documentary films have been awarded various distinctions in Europe and the United States. In 2006, he made My Brother Is Getting Married, his first fiction film.

Cleveland versus Wall Street, a film that recreates a fictional trial between evicted Clevelanders and bankers blamed for the 2008 financial crisis, which was selected for the Directors' Fortnight sidebar of the 2010 Cannes Film Festival, is his fifth feature-length film.

== Filmography ==
- L'Opéra de Paris, documentary, 2017 (The Paris Opera).
- L'Expérience Blocher, documentary, 2013 (The Blocher Experience).
- Cleveland contre Wall Street, documentary, 2010 (Cleveland versus Wall Street).
- Mon frère se marie, fiction, 2006 (My Brother Is Getting Married).
- Mais im Bundeshuus – Le génie helvétique, documentary, 2003 (Corn in Parliament).
- La bonne conduite (5 histoires d’auto-école), documentary, 1999 (The Way I Look at You).
- Connu de nos services, documentary, 1997 (Known to Our Departments).
