= Fabrice Aragno =

Swiss cinematographer

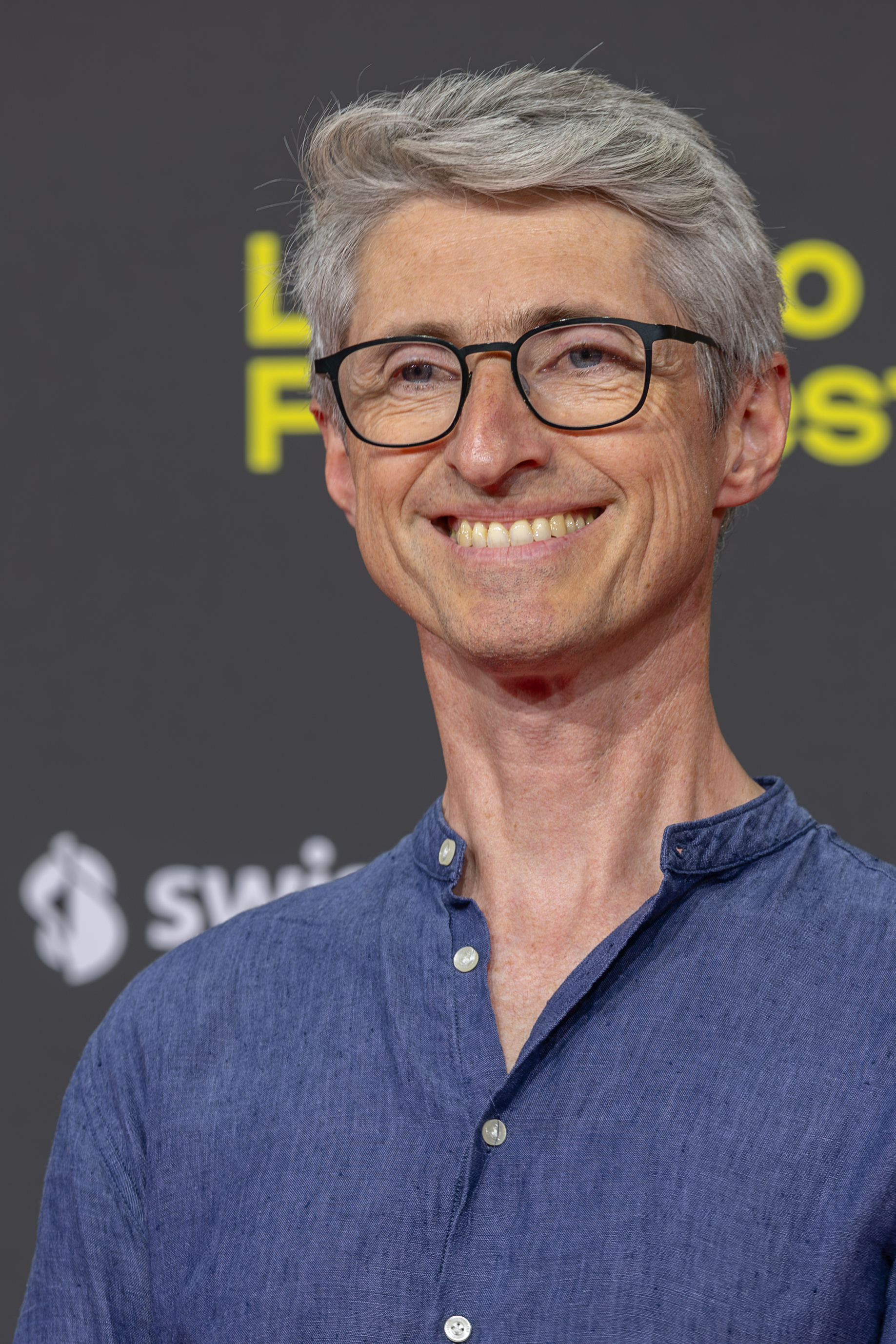
- Fabrice Aragno at the 78th Locarno Film Festival in 2025
- Born: 31 March 1970 (age 56); Neuchâtel, Switzerland
- Education: École cantonale d'art de Lausanne
- Occupation: Cinematographer

Fabrice Aragno (born 31 March 1970) is a Swiss director, producer, and cinematographer.

== Career ==
He attended the École cantonale d'art de Lausanne, graduating in 1998.

Aragno has made several short films, including Dimanche (his graduation film, selected for the 1999 Cannes Film Festival), Le Jeu (2003), and Autour de Claire (2010).

Since 2002, he has worked with Jean-Luc Godard, as production manager on Notre musique (2004) and as cinematographer on Film Socialisme (2010), Les Trois Désastres (2013), Goodbye to Language (French: Adieu au langage) (2014) and The Image Book (2018).

To create certain effects in the 3D film Goodbye to Language (dir. J.-L.Godard, 2014), Aragno built his own camera rig in order to allow the 3D image to appear as a double exposure in each of the spectators eyes. This effect has been called innovative and a new addition to cinematic techniques. Aragno said that he "made a couple of tests with friends at their home of a boy and a girl…I asked the boy to go to the kitchen on my right, and the right camera followed him and the left stayed, so the 3-D broke. The girl is in your left eyes and the boy on the right. When he was in the kitchen, your brain didn’t know how to watch. It hurts to watch a little, but it was interesting, and when the boy comes back to the girl, the two cameras were again in classic 3-D."

In 2012, Radio Télévision Suisse (RTS) employed him as director on a documentary film about Godard, one of a ten-part series on Swiss directors. The film, Quod Erat Demonstrandum, is a 26-minute montage of clips from Godard's films.

Working with the Swiss Film Archive, he edited and co-produced the films Amore carne and Sangue, directed by Pippo Delbono, and directed Freddy Buache, le cinéma. He also directed L'invisible (2013) for the Lemancolia exhibition held at the Musée Jenisch de Vevey, and Pris dans le tourbillon (2014) for general release.

== Filmography ==
=== Filmmaker ===
- 1997: Luchando frijoles - Cuba de un día a otro
- 1998: Dimanche
- 2002: Le Jeu
- 2010: Autour de Claire
- 2012: Freddy Buache - Le Cinéma
- 2012: Quod Erat Demonstrandum
- 2013: L'invisible
- 2014: Pris dans le tourbillon
- 2025: The Lake

=== Director of photography ===
- 2010: Film Socialisme by Jean-Luc Godard
- 2013: Les Trois Désastres by Jean-Luc Godard
- 2014: Adieu au langage by Jean-Luc Godard
- 2018: The Image Book by Jean-Luc Godard

=== Editor and producer ===
- 2011 : Amore Carne by Pippo Delbono
- 2013 : Sangue by Pippo Delbono

== Sources ==
- Cook, Adam (23 October 2012). "Beauty in the Defects: An Interview with Fabrice Aragno". Notebook.
- Nectoux, Gaspard (July–August 2014). "Le lac et le désert. Propos de Fabrice Aragno". Cahiers du cinéma (in French). No. 702. pp. 22–23.
