= God Will Not Help =

2025 film by Hana Jušić

- International promotional poster
- Croatian: Bog neće pomoći
- Directed by: Hana Jušić
- Written by: Hana Jušić
- Produced by: Ankica Jurić Tilić
- Cinematography: Jana Plećaš
- Edited by: Jan Klemsche
- Music by: Stavros Evangelou; Iris Asimakopoulou; Vasilis Chontos
- Production company: Kinorama
- Release date: 8 August 2025 (Locarno)
- Running time: 137 minutes
- Countries: Croatia; Italy; Romania; Greece; France; Slovenia
- Languages: Croatian; Spanish

God Will Not Help (Croatian: Bog neće pomoći) is a 2025 drama film written and directed by Hana Jušić. A co-production of Croatia, Italy, Romania, Greece, France, and Slovenia, it stars Manuela Martelli as Teresa, a Chilean woman who arrives in a remote Croatian shepherding community in the early 20th century.

The film had its world premiere in the main competition of the 78th Locarno Film Festival on 8 August 2025, where it won the Pardo for Best Performance for Manuela Martelli and Ana Marija Veselčić. It was also selected as the Croatian entry for Best International Feature Film at the 99th Academy Awards.

== Premise ==
Set in the early 20th century, a Chilean woman, Teresa, arrives in an isolated community of shepherds in a Croatian mountain range, claiming to be the widow of Marco, a local man who had previously emigrated to Chile. She shows his sister, brothers bones she claims are the remains of their deceased brother and says she has come to bury him in his native soil. She soon works willingly and diligently on the sheep and goat farm alongside the family. She speaks only Spanish, but learns a few key words of Croatian to convey the essence of her quest. She is very religious, praying often and seeing and hearing the dead Marco in visions. She feels compelled to make a confession to Iliya, Marco's brother, who had hoped as a youth to become a priest.

== Cast ==
- Manuela Martelli as Teresa
- Ana Marija Veselčić
- Filip Đurić
- Mauro Ercegović Gracin
- Nikša Butijer

== Production ==
In February 2020, Jušić was announced as one of the participants of TorinoFilmLab Script Lab to develop the screenplay. She was also selected to develop the film during the Cinéfondation Residence in Cannes in 2020. The project participated at the Venice Gap-Financing Market, held during the 79th Venice International Film Festival in September 2022. In March 2024, the project received a €390,000 production grant from the Eurimages.

Principal photography began in August 2024 and concluded in October 2024. It took place in Mount Dinara, Mount Svilaja, and the island of Krk.

== Release ==
God Will Not Help had its world premiere at the 78th Locarno Film Festival on 8 August 2025, competing for the Golden Leopard. Prior to the premiere, New Europe Film Sales acquired the film's international sales. It also competed in the Competition Programme - Feature Film at the 31st Sarajevo Film Festival.

== Accolades ==
| Award | Date of ceremony | Category | Recipient | Result | Ref. |
|---|---|---|---|---|---|
| Locarno Film Festival | 16 August 2025 | Golden Leopard | Hana Jušić | Nominated | |
| Locarno Film Festival | 16 August 2025 | Pardo for Best Performance | Manuela Martelli | Won | |
| Locarno Film Festival | 16 August 2025 | Pardo for Best Performance | Ana Marija Veselčić | Won | |
| Sarajevo Film Festival | 20 August 2025 | Heart of Sarajevo | God Will Not Help | Nominated | |
| CinEast Film Festival | 26 October 2025 | Special Jury Prize | God Will Not Help | Won | |

== See also ==
- List of submissions to the 99th Academy Awards for Best International Feature Film
- List of Croatian submissions for the Academy Award for Best International Feature Film
