= Hana Jušić =

Croatian film director and screenwriter (born 1983)

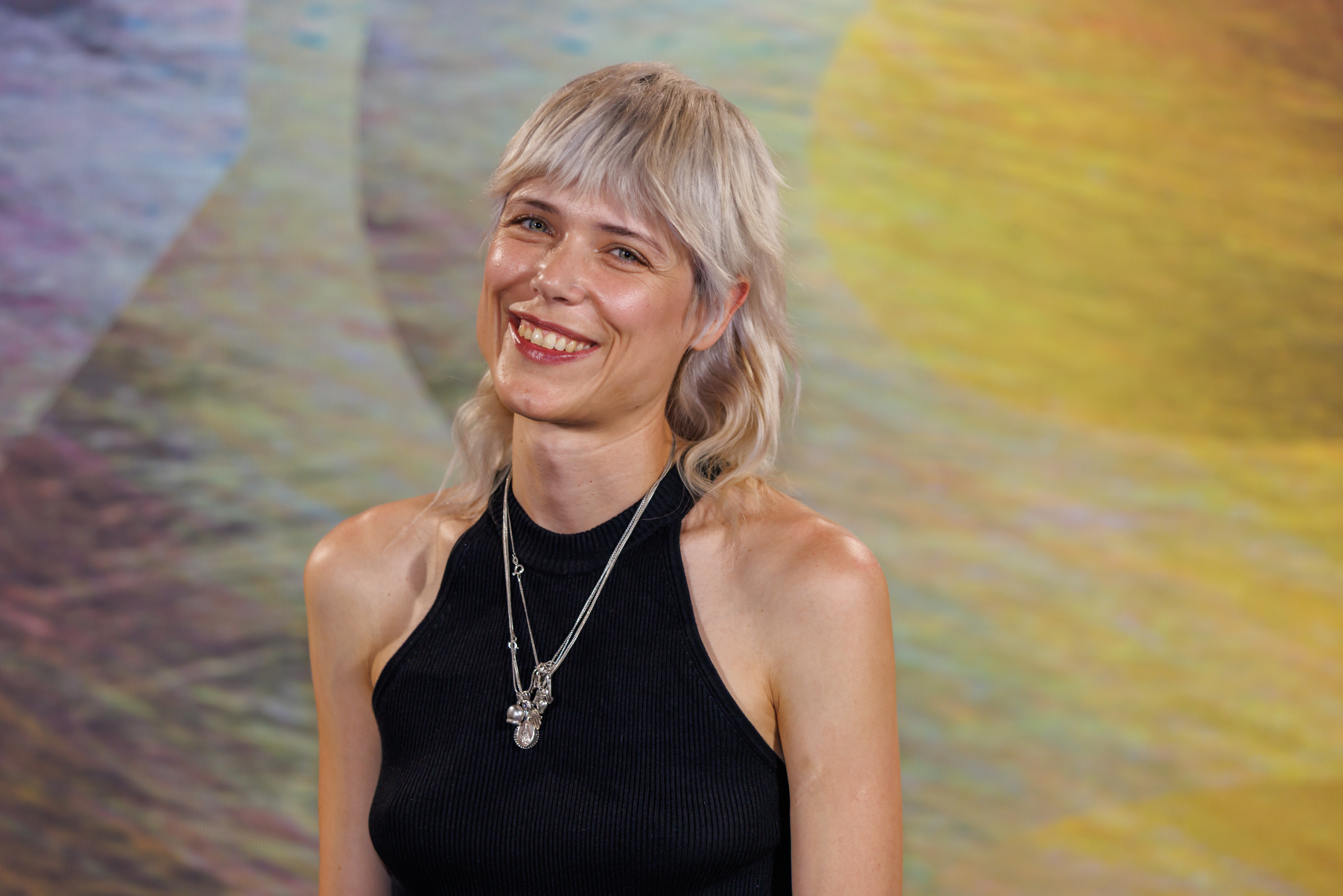
- Jušić at the 78th Locarno Film Festival in 2025
- Born: 1983 (age 42–43); Šibenik, Dalmatia, Croatia
- Occupations: Film director and Screenwriter

Hana Jušić (born 1983) is a Croatian film director and screenwriter.

== Life and career ==
A native of Šibenik, Jušić moved to Zagreb as a child. She majored in comparative literature and English studies at the Faculty of Humanities and Social Sciences, University of Zagreb.

Known earlier in her career for her short films, Jušić received high acclaim for her 2016 feature film debut, Quit Staring at My Plate.

In 2025, God Will Not Help drama film directed and written by Jušić premiered in main competition at the 78th Locarno Film Festival. It also competed in the Competition Programme - Feature Film at the 31st Sarajevo Film Festival.

== Accolades ==
Award	Date of ceremony	Category	Work	Result	Ref.
Locarno Film Festival	16 August 2025	Golden Leopard	God Will Not Help	Nominated	
Sarajevo Film Festival	22 August 2025	Heart of Sarajevo	God Will Not Help	Nominated	
Sarajevo Film Festival	22 August 2025	Special Award for Promoting Gender Equality	God Will Not Help	Won	
