= Hair, Paper, Water... =

2025 Vietnamese documentary film

- Promotional poster
- Vietnamese: Tóc, Giấy và Nước...
- Directed by: Trương Minh Quý; Nicolas Graux
- Produced by: Julie Freres; Thomas Hakim; Julien Graff
- Starring: Cao Thị Hậu; Cao Xuân Doanh; Cao Thị Hiệu; Cao Thị Bát
- Cinematography: Nicolas Graux
- Edited by: Trương Minh Quý
- Music by: Michael Stearns
- Production companies: Dérives; Petit Chaos; Lagi Films
- Release date: 14 August 2025 (Locarno)
- Running time: 71 minutes
- Countries: Belgium; France; Vietnam
- Languages: Ruc; Vietnamese

Hair, Paper, Water... (Vietnamese: Tóc, Giấy và Nước...) is a 2025 documentary film written and directed by Belgian filmmaker Nicolas Graux and Vietnamese director Trương Minh Quý. The film shot on 16mm is a series of 'snapshots' of the life of an elderly Rục lady and her large extended family with a focus on capturing moments and memories. The Rục people were first contacted in 1959, and numbered 580 individuals living in 144 households as of April 2022.

The film had its world premiere at the 78th Locarno Film Festival on 14 August 2025, in the Filmmakers of the Present Competition section, where it won Golden Leopard – Filmmakers of the Present. It competed in Official Competition at the 2025 BFI London Film Festival on 11 October 2025.

== Synopsis ==
The documentary follows Cao Thị Hậu, an elderly woman of the Rục people who was born in a cave and now lives with her extended family in rural Vietnam. As she cares for younger generations, she teaches them words from the endangered Rục language and shares knowledge connected to her community’s way of life. Her present-day routines are interwoven with memories of the past, including dreams of her deceased mother and recollections of the cave she once regarded as home. Through scenes of family life, work and the surrounding landscape, the film examines the fragile transfer of language, memory and cultural identity from one generation to the next.

== Cast ==
- Cao Thị Hậu
- Cao Xuân Doanh
- Cao Thị Hiệu
- Cao Thị Bát

== Production ==
The film was shot on a vintage Bolex camera over three years. It is produced by Julie Freres at Dérives and Petit Chaos, with co-production from WIP and Lagi films. It received support from Centre du Cinéma et de l’Audiovisuel de la Fédération Wallonie-Bruxelles, Ciclic Région Centre-Val de Loire, Procirep, Angoa, Media, Wallonie, Pictanovo, and Brouillon d’un rêve de la Scam.

== Release ==
Hair, Paper, Water... had its world premiere in the 'Filmmakers of the Present Competition' section of the 78th Locarno Film Festival on 9 August 2025, vying for the Golden Leopard – Filmmakers of the Present. It was also showcased in the Wide Angle: Documentary Showcase section of the 30th Busan International Film Festival on 20 September 2025. It also made it to the Currents Selections of the 2025 New York Film Festival, where it had its United States Premiere on 30 September 2025.

It was also selected to compete in the Official Competition section of the 2025 BFI London Film Festival for the best film award and had screening on 11 October 2025.

The film was screened in the Les nouveaux alchimistes for its Canadian Premiere at the 2025 Festival du nouveau cinéma on 13 October 2025, and in International Perspective at the São Paulo International Film Festival on 19 October 2025.

It was screened in the 'Alchemies Section' of the 70th Valladolid International Film Festival on 30 October 2025. It was presented in 'Mission Life - 2025' section of the 56th International Film Festival of India in November 2025. It competed in the 20th Jogja-NETPAC Asian Film Festival on 2 December 2025.

It was screened at CPH:DOX, the Copenhagen International Documentary Film Festival on 7 March 2026 in Artists & Auteurs section, and on 9 June 2026 as part of the DocuDays UA International Human Rights Documentary Film Festival in Docu Best section. On 23 July it competed in the New Horizons International Competition for Grand Prix at the New Horizons Film Festival.

On 16 August 2026, it was screened in the Melbourne International Film Festival in Doc Visions Program Strand for its Victorian Premiere.

The international sales of the film is managed by the Italian distribution company Lights On, who have acquired the international rights in July 2025.

== Reception ==
In his review at Locarno, Marc van de Klashorst of the International Cinephile Society rated the film with 3.5 stars out of five, writing that the "film’s gorgeous 16mm photography might lure a wider group of people." Concluding his review Klashorst opined that since there are only a few hundred Rục left "the film will be all that lasts as a memory of a culture, and for that we have to thank Truong and Graux." David Katz of Cineuropa praised Graux and Trương for co-directing a "pensively beautiful documentary miniature".

== Accolades ==
The film was shortlisted for nomination to 2026 European Film Awards in documentary film category. The award ceremony will take place on 17 January 2026.

Award	Date of ceremony	Category	Recipient	Result	Ref.
Locarno Film Festival	16 August 2025	Golden Leopard – Filmmakers of the Present	Hair, Paper, Water...	Won	
Locarno Film Festival	16 August 2025	Pardo Verde: Special Mentions	Hair, Paper, Water...	Won	
BFI London Film Festival	19 October 2025	Best Film	Hair, Paper, Water...	Nominated	
Valladolid International Film Festival	1 November 2025	Green Spike Award: Honourable Mention	Hair, Paper, Water...	Won	
