= Yakushima's Illusion =

2025 French drama film by Naomi Kawase

- Promotional poster
- French: L'Illusion de Yakushima
- Directed by: Naomi Kawase
- Produced by: David Gauquié; Julien Deris; Jean-Luc Ormières; Renan Artukmaç
- Starring: Vicky Krieps; Kanichiro
- Cinematography: Masaya Suzuki; Arata Dodo
- Edited by: Tina Baz
- Music by: Koki Nakano
- Production companies: Cinéfrance Studios; Kumie Inc.; Tarantula; Viktoria Productions; Pio & CoProd LabMarignan Films
- Distributed by: Ad Vitam; Cinefrance International
- Release dates: 15 August 2025 (Locarno); 17 June 2026 (France)
- Running time: 122 minutes
- Countries: France; Japan; Belgium; Luxembourg
- Languages: French; Japanese; English

Yakushima's Illusion (French: L'Illusion de Yakushima) is a 2025 drama film directed by Naomi Kawase. Starting Vicky Krieps and Kanichiro, the film follows Corry, a French coordinator of pediatric heart transplants, who is sent to Japan where organ donation remains taboo.

An international co-production, the film had its world premiere at the 78th Locarno Film Festival on 15 August 2025, in the Main Competition section, where it competes for Golden Leopard. The film was released by Ad Vitam in France on 17 June 2026.

== Cast ==
- Vicky Krieps as Corry
- Kanichiro as Jin
- Ojiro Nakamura as Hisashi
- Misaki Kakano as Hitomi
- Haruto Tsuchiya as Kakeru
- Ukyo Todoshi as Ukyo
- Rei Okamoto as Hisashi's mother
- Midori Matsuo as Hitomi's mother
- Ryutaro Nakagawa as Hitomi's father
- Saori as Ukyo's mother
- Masatoshi Nagase as Ukyo's father
- Ken Yamamura as Dr. Mizuno
- Tetsu Hirahara as Dr. Hirasaka
- Hijiri Kojima as Medical Coordinator
- Yoshiaki Kameda as Dr. Okita:
- Mitsuki as Dr. Hikari
- Yasufumi Hayashi as Pediatrician
- Go Riju as Father of Jin
- Tomoko Nakajima as Mother of Jin

== Production ==
The film was shot in Yakushima, Japan.

== Release ==
Yakushima's Illusion had its World Premiere at the 78th Locarno Film Festival on 15 August 2025, and competed for Golden Leopard.

It was screened in LEAFF Official Selection of the 10th London East Asian Film Festival on October 25, 2025.

It was also screened in Masters section of the 2025 Stockholm International Film Festival on 7 November 2025. It will compete for IFFI ICFT UNESCO Gandhi Medal at the 56th International Film Festival of India in November 2025.

The film was released in Japanese theatres on 6 February 2026, and in France on 17 June 2026.

== Accolades ==
Award	Date of ceremony	Category	Recipient	Result	Ref.
Locarno Film Festival	16 August 2025	Golden Leopard	Yakushima's Illusion	Nominated	
International Film Festival of India	28 November 2025	IFFI ICFT UNESCO Gandhi Medal	Yakushima's Illusion	Nominated	
