= Jakarta Film Week =

Film festival

- Location: Jakarta, Indonesia
- Founded: 2021
- Hosted by: Tourism and Creative Economy Department of Jakarta
- Website: jakartafilmweek.com

Jakarta Film Week is an international film festival held in Jakarta, Indonesia. It was initiated by the Tourism and Creative Economy Department of Jakarta in 2021, aimed to support the revival of the film industry post the COVID-19 pandemic in Indonesia.

In addition to film screenings and awards, the festival also features talk programs, masterclasses, a short film production funding called Jakarta Film Fund, and a producer's lab.

The inaugural edition of Jakarta Film Week was held on 18 to 21 November 2021, took place at the CGV Grand Indonesia, Metropole XXI, and Ashley Hotel.

== Programs ==
=== Film screening sections ===
The Jakarta Film Week is organised in various sections:

- Global Feature: A competition section for international feature films.
- Official Selection: A non-competition section for international feature films.
- Global Short: A competition section for international short films.
- Official Selection – Short: A non-competition section for international short films.
- Jakarta Film Fund: A competition section for short films by aspiring Indonesian filmmakers, produced through the Jakarta Film Fund initiative.
- Fantasea: A showcase of fantasy and other genre films from around the world.
- Herstory: A showcase of films about women and/or directed by women from around the world.
- Layar Indonesiana: A showcase of short films from the Layar Indonesiana program, initiated by Ministry of Education, Culture, Research, and Technology.

=== Fringe events ===
Other programs are held in addition to film screenings, including:

- Road to Jakarta Film Week: Prior festival events, including online short film screenings through streaming service Vidio and talks.
- Jakarta Film Fund: A short film production fund program. The chosen film proposals are supported by the Tourism and Creative Economy Department of Jakarta, through the grant of technical assistance, production resources, and mentorship by professionals.
- Masterclass: A class or session led by the experts in the film industry.
- Community: A public discussion featuring various innovative and experienced panelists, addressing topics related to the film industry.
- Producer's Lab: A program that guides film producers in equipping themselves with feature film production management, financing, and distribution. Three winners will get the opportunity to attend the Platform Busan as a partnership with Busan International Film Festival.
- JFW Net: A networking program for international filmmakers.

== Awards ==
A number of awards are handed out each year, including:

- Global Feature Award

The Global Feature Award is presented to the best international feature film screened during the Global Feature program.

Year	Film	Director(s)	Countrie(s)
2021	Petite Maman‡	Céline Sciamma	France
2021	Money Has Four Legs†	Maung Sun	Myanmar
2022	Before, Now & Then‡	Kamila Andini	Indonesia
2022	Huesera: The Bone Woman†	Michelle Garza Cervera	Mexico, Peru
2023	Tótem‡	Lila Avilés	Mexico, Denmark, France
2024	Memories of a Burning Body‡	Antonella Sudassasi Fruniss	Costa Rica, Spain
2025	The Devil Smokes (and Saves the Burnt Matches in the Same Box)‡	Ernesto Martínez Bucio	Mexico
2026	Filipiñana‡	Rafael Manuel	United Kingdom, Philippines, Singapore, France, Netherlands

‡ signifies a main award winner
† signifies a Special Mention award winner

- Global Short Award

The Global Short Award is presented to the best international short film screened during the Global Short program.

Year	Film	Director(s)	Country/Region
2021	The Girls Are Alright‡	Gwai Lou	Malaysia
2021	Diary of Cattle†	Lidia Afrilita, David Darmadi	Indonesia
2022	Nauha‡	Pratham Khurana	India
2023	Things Unheard Of‡	Ramazan Kılıç	Turkey
2024	An Orphanage of Memories‡	Rayit Hashmat Qazi	India
2025	A Very Straight Neck‡	Neo Sora	Japan, China
2025	Workers' Wings†	Ilir Hasanaj	Kosovo
2026	Bleat!	Ananth Subramaniam	Malaysia, France, Philippines

- Global Animation Award

The Global Animation Award is presented to the best animation short film screened during the Global Animation program.

Year	Film	Director(s)	Country/Region
2022	Tankboy‡	Novella Lian	Singapore
2022	Bro Dragon, The City is Under Attack!†	Fajar Martha Santosa	Indonesia
2023	Mortelli, A Hopeless Case‡	Ben Fernández	Spain
2024	It Shouldn't Rain Tomorrow‡	Maria Trigo Teixeira	Portugal, Germany
2025	And Granny Would Dance‡	Maryam Mohajer	United Kingdom
2026	What We Leave Behind‡	Alexandra Myotte, Jean-Sébastien Hamel	Canada

- Direction Award

The Direction Award is presented to the best Indonesian feature film screened during the festival.

Year	Film	Director(s)
2021	Tale of Time‡	Agni Tirta
2021	Death Knot†	Cornelio Sunny
2022	Stealing Raden Saleh‡	Angga Dwimas Sasongko
2023	Women from Rote Island‡	Jeremias Nyangoen
2024	Yohanna‡	Razka Robby Ertanto
2024	Suzzanna: Queen of Black Magic†	David Gregory
2025	Crocodile Tears‡	Tumpal Tampubolon
2026	Nobody Loves Kay‡	Bernardus Raka

- Jakarta Film Fund Award

The Jakarta Film Fund Award is presented to the best short film produced during the Jakarta Film Fund program.

Year	Film	Director(s)
2021	Ring Road‡	Andrew Kose
2021	One Night in Chinatown†	William Adiguna
2022	Bukan Anak Meriam‡	Nehemia Pareang
2023	Happy Wednesday‡	Candra Aditya
2024	If You're Happy, I'm Happy‡	Mauliya Maila
2025	Cream Bath Aftermath‡	Tahlia Motik
2026	The Year Without Summer‡	Rayhan Dharmawan

- Series of the Year

The Series of the Year award is presented to the best series produced and screened during the year.

Year	Series	Director(s)	Network
2022	What We Lose to Love	Yandy Laurens	Disney+ Hotstar
2023	Blood Curse	Kimo Stamboel	Disney+ Hotstar
2024	Cinta Pertama Ayah	Hadrah Daeng Ratu	Vidio
