= 2026 Jakarta Film Week =

Film festival edition

2025 Jakarta Film Week
- Opening film: Ah Girl by Ang Geck Geck Priscilla
- Closing film: The Sea Speaks His Name by Yosep Anggi Noen
- Location: Jakarta, Indonesia
- Awards: Global Feature Award: Filipiñana by Rafael Manuel
- Festival date: 21–25 October 2026
- Website: jakartafilmweek.com

Jakarta Film Week chronology
- 2025

The 2026 Jakarta Film Week, the sixth edition of the film festival Jakarta Film Week, took place from 21 to 25 October 2026 in Jakarta, Indonesia. The festival opened with Ang Geck Geck Priscilla's drama film Ah Girl and closed with political drama film The Sea Speaks His Name by Yosep Anggi Noen.

The Global Feature Award was presented to black comedy drama film Filipiñana by Rafael Manuel.

== Juries ==
The following juries were named at the festival:

=== Global Feature Award ===
- Sarah Arnold, Swiss-Italian filmmaker
- Aryo Danusiri, Indonesian director and lecturer
- Park Sungho, Korean film programmer

=== Direction Award ===
- Charles Gozali, Indonesian filmmaker
- Jessica Kiang, Irish film critic
- Kong Rithdee, Thai film critic

=== Global Short Award ===
- Panos Kotzathanasis, Greek film critic and journalist
- Sherina Munaf, Indonesian actress and composer
- Neo Sora, Japanese-American filmmaker

=== Global Animation Award ===
- Sunny Gho, co-founder of Jakarta Illustration & Creative Arts Festival
- Sally Wongso, Indonesian storyboard artist
- Yoko Yamanaka, Japanese film director

=== Jakarta Film Fund Award ===
- Desa Apridini, Special Staff to the Governor of Jakarta
- Susanti Dewi, Indonesian film producer
- Aleksandra Zakharchenko, Head of Industry Programs at Marché du Film

== Official selection ==
=== Opening and closing films ===
English title	Original title	Director(s)	Production countrie(s)
Ah Girl (opening film)		Ang Geck Geck Priscilla	Singapore
The Sea Speaks His Name (closing film)	Laut Bercerita	Yosep Anggi Noen	Indonesia

=== In competition ===
==== Global Feature Award ====
English title	Original title	Director(s)	Production countrie(s)
Burn	炎上	Makoto Nagahisa	Japan
Chronicles from the Siege	وقائع زمن الحصاروقائع زمن الحصار	Abdallah Al-Khatib	Algeria, France, Palestine
Filipiñana		Rafael Manuel	United Kingdom, Philippines, Singapore, France, Netherlands
Rose		Markus Schleinzer	Austria, Germany
Teenage Sex and Death at Camp Miasma		Jane Schoenbrun	United States

==== Direction Award ====
English title	Original title	Director(s)	Production countrie(s)
Bandit		Brian L. Tan	Indonesia
Mate's Rate	Harga Teman	Andrew Kose	Indonesia
Nobody Loves Kay		Bernardus Raka	Indonesia
Our Son	Dua Hati Ibu	Luhki Herwanayogi	Indonesia
Togel		Yogi S. Calam	Indonesia

==== Global Short Award ====
English title	Original title	Director(s)	Production countrie(s)
B-Xoriakh		Photis Giarentis	Greece
Bleat!	கத்து!	Ananth Subramaniam	Malaysia, France, Philippines
Dark Skin Bruises Differently		Susan Wokoma	United Kingdom
The Dream Is a Snail	Giấc Mơ Là Ốc Sên	Nguyễn Thiên Ân	Vietnam, South Korea
Erased from the Map	Dihapus dari Peta	Maarij Reka	Indonesia
Fruit	Buah	Jen Nee Lim	Singapore
Laser-Cat	Laser-Gato	Lucas Acher	United States, Brazil, United Kingdom
The Leopard	Waagh	Mukti Krishan	India
Madrugada		Sebastián Lojo	Guatemala, Turkey, United Kingdom
Paper Life	美好生活	An Chu	Taiwan
Paradise Garden	Les jardins du paradis	Sonia Terrab	Morocco, France
Tutti	Ni chui do wo chui si	Zhuang Rong-Zuo	Taiwan

==== Global Animation Award ====
English title	Original title	Director(s)	Production countrie(s)
Carla and Her Legs	Carla und ihre Beine	Christoph Büttner	Germany
Cosmonauts		Leo Černic	Slovenia, Italy
I Am Not Here Anymore	Już mnie nie ma	Nawojka Wierzbowska	Poland, France
My Grandmother Is a Skydiver		Polina Piddubna	Germany, Ukraine
School Show	Priredba	Ana Horvat	Croatia
Sorrow Doesn't Sleep at Night	La pena no duerme de noche	Martín André, Josefina Montino	Chile
Sulaimani		Vinnie Ann Bose	Poland, France
Sunflowers in Sorrow	Le chagrin des tournesols	Léa Krawczyk	France
What We Leave Behind	Ce qu'on laisse derrière	Alexandra Myotte, Jean-Sébastien Hamel	Canada

=== Currents ===
English title	Original title	Director(s)	Production countrie(s)
Couture		Alice Winocour	United States, France
Hearing	Thính Giác	Lê Bảo	Singapore, Vietnam, Norway, France, Indonesia, Saudi Arabia, Cambodia, Thailand, Taiwan
In a Whisper	À voix basse	Leyla Bouzid	France, Tunisia
La grazia		Paolo Sorrentino	Italy
Rosebush Pruning		Karim Aïnouz	United Kingdom, Italy, Germany, Spain

=== Global Feature – Official Selection ===
English title	Original title	Director(s)	Production countrie(s)
9 Temples to Heaven	9 วัด สู่สวรรค์	Sompot Chidgasornpongse	Thailand, Singapore, France, Norway, China, Hong Kong, Indonesia, Qatar
Back to Buenos Aires	Ritorno a Buenos Aires	Marco Bechis	Italy, Brazil
A Bowl of Chicken Noodles Before I Die	Seporsi Mie Ayam Sebelum Mati	Kuntz Agus	Indonesia
Erupcja		Pete Ohs	United States, Poland
Forbidden City	La città proibita	Gabriele Mainetti	Italy
GJLS: Berapi-api		Monty Tiwa	Indonesia
The Mutation	사랑의 탄생	Shin Su-won	South Korea
The Tasters	Le assaggiatrici	Silvio Soldini	Italy, Belgium, Switzerland
Too Many Beasts	L'Espèce explosive	Sarah Arnold	France
Trick	Scherzetto	Mario Martone	Italy
We Are Aliens	我々は宇宙人	Kohei Kadowaki	Japan
A Year of School	Un anno di scuola	Laura Samani	Italy, France

=== Herstory ===
English title	Original title	Director(s)	Production countrie(s)
10s Across the Borders		Chan Sze-Wei	Philippines, Singapore, Germany, United Kingdom
Four Seasons in Java	Empat Musim Pertiwi	Kamila Andini	Indonesia, Singapore, Netherlands, Norway, Germany, France, Poland, Thailand
The Girl with the Leica	La ragazza con la Leica	Alina Marazzi	Italy, Germany, Sweden

=== Fantasea ===
English title	Original title	Director(s)	Production countrie(s)
Donkey Princess	Princesa burro	Cristobal León & Joaquín Cociña	Chile, France, Netherlands, Uruguay, Germany
Mum, I'm Alien Pregnant		THUNDERLIPS	New Zealand

== Awards ==
The following awards were presented during the festival:

- Global Feature Award: Filipiñana by Rafael Manuel
- Global Short Award: Bleat! by Ananth Subramaniam
- Global Animation Award: What We Leave Behind by Alexandra Myotte and Jean-Sébastien Hamel
- Direction Award: Nobody Loves Kay by Bernardus Raka
- Jakarta Film Fund Award: The Year Without Summer by Rayhan Dharmawan
