= 2025 Jakarta Film Week =

Film festival edition

- Opening film: The Fox King by Woo Ming Jin
- Closing film: Dopamine by Teddy Soeria Atmadja
- Location: Jakarta, Indonesia
- Awards: Global Feature Award: The Devil Smokes (and Saves the Burnt Matches in the Same Box) by Ernesto Martínez Bucio
- Festival date: 22–26 October 2025
- Website: jakartafilmweek.com

Jakarta Film Week chronology
- 2026 2024

The 2025 Jakarta Film Week, the fifth edition of the film festival Jakarta Film Week, took place from 22 to 26 October 2025 in Jakarta, Indonesia. The festival opened with Woo Ming Jin's drama film The Fox King and closed with crime romance film Dopamine by Teddy Soeria Atmadja.

The most prestigious award of the festival, Global Feature Award, was presented to drama film The Devil Smokes (and Saves the Burnt Matches in the Same Box) by Ernesto Martínez Bucio.

== Juries ==
The following juries were named at the festival:

=== Global Feature Award ===
- Dương Diệu Linh, Vietnamese film director
- Eiko Mizuno-Gray, Japanese film producer
- Srikanth Srinivasan, Indian film critic

=== Global Short Award ===
- Della Dartyan, Indonesian actress
- Leong Puiyee, Singaporean film programmer
- Rayit Hashmat Qazi, Kashmiri film director

=== Global Animation Award ===
- Reda Gaudiamo, Indonesian author and musician
- Agil Prakoso, Indonesian animator
- The Popo, Indonesian visual artist

=== Direction Award ===
- Paolo Bertolin, Italian film programmer
- Amanda Nell Eu, Malaysian film director
- Keiko Funato, co-CEO of Alpha Violet

=== Jakarta Film Fund Award ===
- Cristian Imanuell, Indonesian film producer
- Andhika Permata, Head of Tourism and Creative Economy Department of Jakarta
- Fransiska Prihadi, program director of Minikino Film Week

== Official selection ==
=== Opening and closing films ===
English title	Original title	Director(s)	Production countrie(s)
The Fox King (opening film)		Woo Ming Jin	Malaysia, Indonesia
Dopamine (closing film)	Dopamin	Teddy Soeria Atmadja	Indonesia

=== In competition ===
==== Global Feature ====
English title	Original title	Director(s)	Production countrie(s)
The Devil Smokes (and Saves the Burnt Matches in the Same Box)	El Diablo Fuma (y guarda las cabezas de los cerillos quemados en la misma caja)	Ernesto Martínez Bucio	Mexico
Hanami		Denise Fernandes	Switzerland, Portugal, Cape Verde
Hysteria		Mehmet Akif Büyükatalay	Germany
Lost Land	Harà Watan	Akio Fujimoto	Japan, France, Malaysia, Germany
Sunshine		Antoinette Jadaone	Philippines

==== Global Short ====
English title	Original title	Director(s)	Production countrie(s)
Anatomy of a Call	通訊默示錄	Arnold Tam	Hong Kong
The Cascade	La cascada	Pablo Delgado	Mexico
Coyotes	ذئاب البراري	Said Zagha	France, Palestine, Jordan, United Kingdom
Dancing in the Corner	Taniec w narożniku	Jan Bujnowski	Poland
Healthy Cure	Cura sana	Lucía G. Romero	Spain
Somewhere in Between	بتتذكري	Dahlia Nemlich	France, Lebanon, Egypt
This Is Budi's Mother	Ini Ibu Budi	Abimana Aryasatya	Indonesia
There Will Come Soft Rains		Elham Ehsas	United Kingdom
A Very Straight Neck		Neo Sora	Japan, China
What If They Bomb Here Tonight?		Samir Syriani	Lebanon
Workers' Wings	Krahët e punëtorëve	Ilir Hasanaj	Kosovo, Switzerland

==== Global Animation Award ====
English title	Original title	Director(s)	Production countrie(s)
And Granny Would Dance		Maryam Mohajer	United Kingdom
The Bleacher		Nicole Daddona, Adam Wilder	United States
Find Me	私を見つけて	Akari Maru	Japan
I Am a Flower		Ariel Victor Arthanto	Germany
Magic Candies	あめだま	Daisuke Nishio	Japan
Mama Micra		Rebecca Blöcher	Germany
The Salami Sandwich	El Sanguche de Salame	Clarisa Lea Place	Argentina
Sea Angels		Cissi Efraimsson	Sweden, United States

=== Direction Award ===
English title	Original title	Director(s)	Production countrie(s)
Crocodile Tears	Air Mata Buaya	Tumpal Tampubolon	Indonesia, France, Singapore, Germany
Pesugihan Sate Gagak		Etienne Caesar, Dono Pradana	Indonesia
Planet of Love		Ika Wulandari	Indonesia
Tale of the Land		Loeloe Hendra	Indonesia, Philippines, Taiwan, Qatar
The Ultimate Actor	Si Paling Aktor	Ody Harahap	Indonesia

=== Global Feature – Official Selection ===
English title	Original title	Director(s)	Production countrie(s)
Diamonds in the Sand	砂の中のダイヤモンド	Janus Victoria	Philippines, Japan, Malaysia
Kika		Alexe Poukine	Belgium, France
The Life That Remains	وين صرنا	Dorra Zarrouk	Egypt
The Ugly	얼굴	Yeon Sang-ho	South Korea

=== Currents ===
English title	Original title	Director(s)	Production countrie(s)
The Mysterious Gaze of the Flamingo	La misteriosa mirada del flamenco	Diego Céspedes	Chile, France, Belgium, Spain, Germany
Renoir	ルノワール	Chie Hayakawa	Japan, Indonesia, France, Philippines, Singapore
The Voice of Hind Rajab	صوت هند رجب	Kaouther Ben Hania	Tunisia, France

=== Fantasea ===
English title	Original title	Director(s)	Production countrie(s)
Becoming Human	ជាតិជាមនុស្សា	Polen Ly	Cambodia
Queens of the Dead		Tina Romero	United States

=== Herstory ===
English title	Original title	Director(s)	Production countrie(s)
Fantasy		Kukla	Slovenia, Albania, Serbia, Bosnia and Herzegovina, North Macedonia
The Last Woman on Earth	지구 최후의 여자	Yeum Moon-kyoung, Lee Jong-min	South Korea
Pavane for an Infant	搖籃凡世	Chong Keat Aun	Malaysia, Hong Kong

=== Family Time ===
English title	Original title	Director(s)	Production countrie(s)
Maya, Give Me a Title	Maya, donne-moi un titre	Michel Gondry	France

=== Classique ===
English title	Original title	Director(s)	Production countrie(s)
Turang (1957)		Bachtiar Siagian	Indonesia

=== Bioscoop Belanda ===
English title	Original title	Director(s)	Production countrie(s)
Happy Palace		Nicole van Kilsdonk	Netherlands
Straight Outta Space	Straatcoaches vs Aliens	Michael Middelkoop	Netherlands

=== Made in Hong Kong ===
English title	Original title	Director(s)	Production countrie(s)
Another World	世外	Tommy Kai Chung Ng	Hong Kong
Band Four	4拍4家族	Lai Yan Chi	Hong Kong
Possession Street	邪Mall	Jack Lai	Hong Kong
Stuntman	武替道	Albert and Herbert Leung	Hong Kong

== Awards ==
The following awards were presented at the festival:

- Global Feature Award: The Devil Smokes (and Saves the Burnt Matches in the Same Box) by Ernesto Martínez Bucio
- Global Short Award: A Very Straight Neck by Neo Sora
  - Global Short Award – Special Mention: Workers' Wings by Ilir Hasanaj
- Global Animation Award: And Granny Would Dance by Maryam Mohajer
- Direction Award: Crocodile Tears by Tumpal Tampubolon
- Jakarta Film Fund Award: Cream Bath Aftermath by Tahlia Motik
- Nongshim Award for Best Feature Film: Crocodile Tears by Tumpal Tampubolon
- Nongshim Award for Best Short Film: A Tale for My Daughter by Wulan Putri
