= 2021 Jakarta Film Week =

Inaugural edition of film festival

- Opening film: Ranah 3 Warna by Guntur Soeharjanto
- Closing film: Whether the Weather Is Fine by Carlo Francisco Manatad
- Location: Jakarta, Indonesia
- Founded: 2021
- Awards: Global Feature Award: Petite Maman by Céline Sciamma
- Festival date: 18–21 November 2021
- Website: jakartafilmweek.com

Jakarta Film Week chronology
- 2022

The inaugural edition of Jakarta Film Week was held on 18 to 21 November 2021 by the Tourism and Creative Economy Department of Jakarta as an effort to support the revival of film industry post the COVID-19 pandemic in Indonesia. The festival was held in-person and virtual around Central Jakarta at the CGV Grand Indonesia, Metropole XXI, and Ashley Hotel, also through streaming service Vidio. Actress Shenina Cinnamon was appointed as the festival ambassador.

The most prestigious award of the festival, Global Feature Award, was presented to French drama film Petite Maman, directed by Céline Sciamma.

== Juries ==
The following juries were named for the festival.

=== Global Feature Award ===
- Eric Sasono, film critic
- Garin Nugroho, film director
- Edwin Nazir, film producer

=== Global Short Award ===
- Carlo Francisco Manatad, filmmaker and editor
- Isma Savitri, journalist
- Hikmat Darmawan, film critic

=== Direction Award ===
- Yulia Evina Bhara, film producer
- Teddy Soeriaatmadja, film director
- Anthony Buncio, creative executive and film producer

=== Jakarta Film Fund Award ===
- Ismail Basbeth, film director
- Andhika Permata, Head of Tourism and Creative Economy Department of Jakarta
- Lulu Ratna, filmmaker and educator

== Official selection ==
The official selection of the festival was announced during a press conference on 5 November 2021.

=== Opening and closing films ===
English title	Original title	Director(s)	Production countrie(s)
Ranah 3 Warna (opening film)		Guntur Soeharjanto	Indonesia
Whether the Weather Is Fine (closing film)	Kun Maupay Man It Panahon	Carlo Francisco Manatad	Philippines, Indonesia, France, Germany, Singapore, Qatar

=== Global Feature – Competition ===
English title	Original title	Director(s)	Production countrie(s)
Barbarian Invasion	野蛮人入侵	Tan Chui Mui	Malaysia, Philippines, Hong Kong
Black Box	Boîte noire	Yann Gozlan	France
Death Knot	Tali Mati	Cornelio Sunny	Indonesia
Just Mom	Ibu	Jeihan Angga	Indonesia
Kadet 1947		Rahabi Mandra, Aldo Swastia	Indonesia
Me and the Cult Leader	AGANAI 地下鉄サリン事件と私	Atsushi Sakahara	Japan
Money Has Four Legs†	ခြေလေးချောင်း	Maung Sun	Myanmar
Nussa		Bonny Wirasmono	Indonesia
Petite Maman‡		Céline Sciamma	France
Tale of Time	Dari Hal Waktu	Agni Tirta	Indonesia
Yowis Ben 3		Fajar Nugros, Bayu Skak	Indonesia

Highlighted title and double-dagger (‡) indicates Global Feature Award winner.
Highlighted title and dagger (†) indicates Global Feature Award Special Mention winner.

=== Global Feature – Non Competition ===
English title	Original title	Director(s)	Production countrie(s)
12x12 Untitled	बारह X बारह	Gaurav Madan	India
Aline		Valérie Lemercier	France, Canada
Bete's Love	Cinta Bete	Roy Lolang	Indonesia
Everyday is a Lullaby		Putrama Tuta	Indonesia
Luzzu		Alex Camilleri	Malta
Mang Jose		Raynier Brizuela	Philippines
Marapu, Fire & Ritual		Andrew Campbell	Indonesia
Recalled	내일의 기억	Seo Yoo-min	South Korea
Shankar's Fairies		Irfana Majumdar	India
Souad	سعاد	Ayten Amin	Egypt, Germany, Tunisia
The Tales of Black Saint	I racconti del Santo Nero	Ludovica Fales	Italy
Trees Under the Sun	Veyilmarangal	Bijukumar Damodaran	India
You and I		Fanny Chotimah	Indonesia
Zero	精神0	Kazuhiro Soda	Japan, United States

== Awards ==
The following awards were presented at the festival:

- Global Feature Award: Petite Maman by Céline Sciamma
  - Global Feature Special Mention: Money Has Four Legs by Maung Sun
- Global Short Award: The Girls Are Alright by Gwai Lou
  - Global Short Special Mention: Diary of Cattle by David Darmadi dan Lidia Afrilita
- Direction Award: Tale of Time by Agni Tirta
  - Direction Special Mention: Death Knot by Cornelio Sunny
- Jakarta Film Fund Award: Ring Road by Andrew Kose
  - Jakarta Film Fund Special Mention: One Night in Chinatown by William Adiguna
