= Mate's Rate =

2026 film by Andrew Kose

- Indonesian: Harga Teman
- Directed by: Andrew Kose
- Written by: Andrew Kose; Alicia Angelina
- Based on: Harga Teman: Design, Resign, Redesign by Debora Danisa
- Produced by: Wregas Bhanuteja; Anandita Devitarianti; Amalia Fitriani; Iman Usman
- Starring: Freya JKT48; Devano Danendra; Emir Mahira; Diandra Agatha
- Production company: Rekata Studio
- Release dates: 23 October 2026 (Jakarta); 21 January 2027 (Indonesia)
- Running time: 118 minutes
- Country: Indonesia
- Language: Indonesian

Mate's Rate (Indonesian: Harga Teman) is a 2026 Indonesian coming-of-age romantic comedy film directed by Andrew Kose in his directorial debut. He co-wrote the screenplay with Alicia Angelina, based on Debora Danisa's novel Harga Teman: Design, Resign, Redesign. It stars Freya JKT48 as Uji, a graphic designer who starts a creative agency with her closest friends.

It had its world premiere at the 2026 Jakarta Film Week on 23 October 2026, competing for the Direction Award. It is set to have an Indonesian theatrical release on 21 January 2027.

== Premise ==
After losing her dream job, a graphic designer establishes a small creative agency with her closest friends. However, their friendship is put to the test when they take on a major project that threatens the agency's future.

== Cast ==
- Freya JKT48 as Uji
- Devano Danendra as Julian
- Emir Mahira as Boshi
- Diandra Agatha as Sunny

== Production ==
In November 2025, it was reported that Freya JKT48 would star in a film adaptation of Debora Danisa's novel Harga Teman: Design, Resign, Redesign in an undisclosed role. In April 2026, Rekata Studio announced the film and released a teaser trailer to be shown before every screening of Levitating.

== Release ==
Mate's Rate had its world premiere at the 2026 Jakarta Film Week on 23 October 2026, competing for the Direction Award. The film is set to have its Indonesian theatrical release on 21 January 2027.

== Accolades ==
Award / Film Festival	Date of ceremony	Category	Recipient(s)	Result	Ref.
Jakarta Film Week	25 October 2026	Direction Award	Andrew Kose	Nominated	
