= 2023 Jakarta Film Week =

Film festival

- Opening film: Andragogy by Wregas Bhanuteja
- Closing film: Tiger Stripes by Amanda Nell Eu
- Location: Jakarta, Indonesia
- Founded: 2021
- Awards: Global Feature Award: Tótem by Lila Avilés
- No. of films: 103
- Festival date: 25–29 October 2023
- Website: jakartafilmweek.com

Jakarta Film Week chronology
- 2024 2022

The 2023 Jakarta Film Week, the third edition of the film festival Jakarta Film Week, was held on 25 to 29 October 2023. The festival opened with Wregas Bhanuteja's film Andragogy, and closed with Amanda Nell Eu's body horror film Tiger Stripes.

It was held in-person around Central Jakarta at the CGV Grand Indonesia, Ashley Hotel, Kineforum Ismail Marzuki Park and a new venue: Galeri Indonesia Kaya, also located at Grand Indonesia. Some of the screenings were also streamed virtually through streaming service Vidio. A total of 103 films from 44 countries were screened during the festival.

The most prestigious award of the festival, Global Feature Award, was presented to drama film Tótem directed by Lila Avilés.

== Juries ==
The following juries were named for the festival.

=== Global Feature Award ===
- Chie Hayakawa, director
- Sébastien Chesneau, founder of Cercamon
- Kiki Fung, program consultant of Hong Kong International Film Festival

=== Global Short Award ===
- Yow Chong Lee, festival director and lecturer
- M. Reza Fahriyansyah, director
- Asmara Abigail, actor

=== Global Animation Award ===
- Alfeus Christie, food illustrator and animator
- Sabrina Rochelle Kalangie, director and screenwriter
- Chandra Endroputro, animator

=== Direction Award ===
- Kim Young Woo, programmer
- Naman Ramachandran, author and journalist
- Yosep Anggi Noen, director

=== Jakarta Film Fund Award ===
- Yandy Laurens, director and screenwriter
- Lorna Tee, film producer and curator
- Andhika Permata, Head of Tourism and Creative Economy Department of Jakarta

=== Series of the Year ===
- Rahabi Mandra, director and screenwriter
- Ratih Kumala, screenwriter and author
- Anggia Kharisma, film producer

== Official selection ==
=== Global Feature ===
| English title | Original title | Director(s) | Production countrie(s) |
|---|---|---|---|
| Andragogy (opening film) | Budi Pekerti | Wregas Bhanuteja | Indonesia, Singapore |
| Harlot's Prayer | Tuhan, Izinkan Aku Berdosa | Hanung Bramantyo | Indonesia |
| La Luna | | M. Raihan Halim | Singapore, Malaysia |
| Midwives | Sages-femmes | Léa Fehner | France |
| One Big Sumba Family | | Tonny Trimarsanto | Indonesia |
| Past Lives | | Celine Song | United States |
| The Prize | Onde Mande! | Paul Agusta | Indonesia |
| Sweet Dreams | | Ena Sendijarević | Netherlands, Belgium, Bosnia and Herzegovina, Sweden, France, Indonesia |
| Tótem‡ | | Lila Avilés | Mexico, Denmark, France |
| Women from Rote Island | Perempuan Berkelamin Darah | Jeremias Nyangoen | Indonesia |

Highlighted title and double-dagger (‡) indicates Global Feature Award winner.

=== Global Short ===
| English title | Original title | Director(s) | Production countrie(s) |
|---|---|---|---|
| A Day, That Year | 某天，那年 | Stanley Xu | Taiwan, Singapore |
| Basri & Salma in a Never-Ending Comedy | Basri & Salma dalam Komedi yang Terus Berputar | Khozy Rizal | Indonesia, United States |
| Bergie | | Dian Weys | South Africa |
| File | پرونده | Sonia K. Hadad | Iran |
| Further and Further Away | ឆា្ងយដាច់អាល័យ | Polen Ly | Cambodia |
| Glorious Revolution | | Masha Novikova | United Kingdom, Ukraine |
| Invisibles | | Esteban García Garzón | Colombia |
| Things Unheard Of | Serpêhatiyên Neqewimî | Ramazan Kılıç | Turkey |
| Vania on Lima Street | | Bayu Prihantoro Filemon | Indonesia |
| Will You Look at Me? | 当我望向你的时候 | Shuli Huang | China |

Highlighted title and double-dagger (‡) indicates Global Short Award winner.

=== Global Animation ===
| English title | Original title | Director(s) | Production countrie(s) |
|---|---|---|---|
| Domio Instano Extendido | | Gugun Arief | Indonesia |
| Dying to Defrost | | Heather Ann Abeyasekera | Singapore |
| Hana Meets Hana | | Kim Jeong-Byeon-Ji | South Korea |
| Hair Universe | 머리카락 우주 | Choi Jin-uk | South Korea |
| I Swarnangkara | | Petra Patria D. Paramita | Indonesia |
| Interns | Becarias | Marina Donderis, Núria Poveda, Marina Cortón | Spain |
| Loose Threads | | Chayanid Siripaiboolpong, Jessieca Junesha | Singapore |
| Mortelli, a Hopeless Case | Mortelli, un cas perdut | Ben Fernández | Spain |
| That Doesn't Fit | | Ackshaj Anand | India |
| To Ankur | | Nitya Sathian | India |

=== Official Selection ===
| English title | Original title | Director(s) | Production countrie(s) |
|---|---|---|---|
| Beyond Utopia | | Madeleine Gavin | United States |
| The Breaking Ice | 燃冬 | Anthony Chen | China, Singapore |
| The Eternal Memory | La Memoria infinita | Maite Alberdi | Chile |
| Hanging Gardens | جنائن معلقة | Ahmed Yassin Al Daradji | Iraq, Palestine, Egypt, United Kingdom, Saudi Arabia |
| I Haven't Done Anything | 좋.댓.구 | Park Sang-min | South Korea |
| If Only I Could Hibernate | Баавгай болохсон | Zoljargal Purevdash | Mongolia, France, Qatar, Switzerland |
| Terrestrial Verses | آیه های زمینی | Ali Asgari, Alireza Khatami | Iran |
| Tiger Stripes (closing film) | | Amanda Nell Eu | Malaysia, France, Germany, Indonesia, Netherlands, Qatar, Singapore, Taiwan |

=== Fantasea ===
| English title | Original title | Director(s) | Production countrie(s) |
|---|---|---|---|
| Domingo and the Mist | Domingo y la niebla | Ariel Escalante | Costa Rica, Qatar |
| My Grandfather's Demons | Os Demónios do Meu Avô | Nuno Beato | Portugal, Netherlands, Spain |
| Sana | ミンナのウタ | Takashi Shimizu | Japan |

=== Herstory ===
| English title | Original title | Director(s) | Production countrie(s) |
|---|---|---|---|
| Elaha | | Milena Aboyan | Germany |
| Her Hobby | 그녀의 취미생활 | Ha Myung-mi | South Korea |

=== Series on Screen ===
| English title | Original title | Director(s) | Original network |
|---|---|---|---|
| Blood Curse‡ | Teluh Darah | Kimo Stamboel | Disney+ Hotstar |
| Cinlock - Love, Camera, Action | | Andrew Kose | Vision+ |
| Drama Ratu Drama | | Aco Tenri | Vidio |
| Losmen Melati | | Mike Wiluan, Billy Christian | Catchplay |
| The Talent Agency | Hubungi Agen Gue! | Teddy Soeriaatmadja | Disney+ Hotstar |

Highlighted title and double-dagger (‡) indicates Series of the Year winner.

== Awards ==
The following awards were presented at the festival:

- Global Feature Award: Tótem by Lila Avilés
- Global Short Award: Things Unheard Of by Ramazan Kılıç
- Global Animation Award: Mortelli, A Hopeless Case by Ben Fernández
- Direction Award: Women from Rote Island by Jeremias Nyangoen
- Jakarta Film Fund Award: Happy Wednesday by Candra Aditya
- Series of the Year: Blood Curse by Kimo Stamboel (Disney+ Hotstar)
