= Me and the Cult Leader =

2020 Japanese documentary film

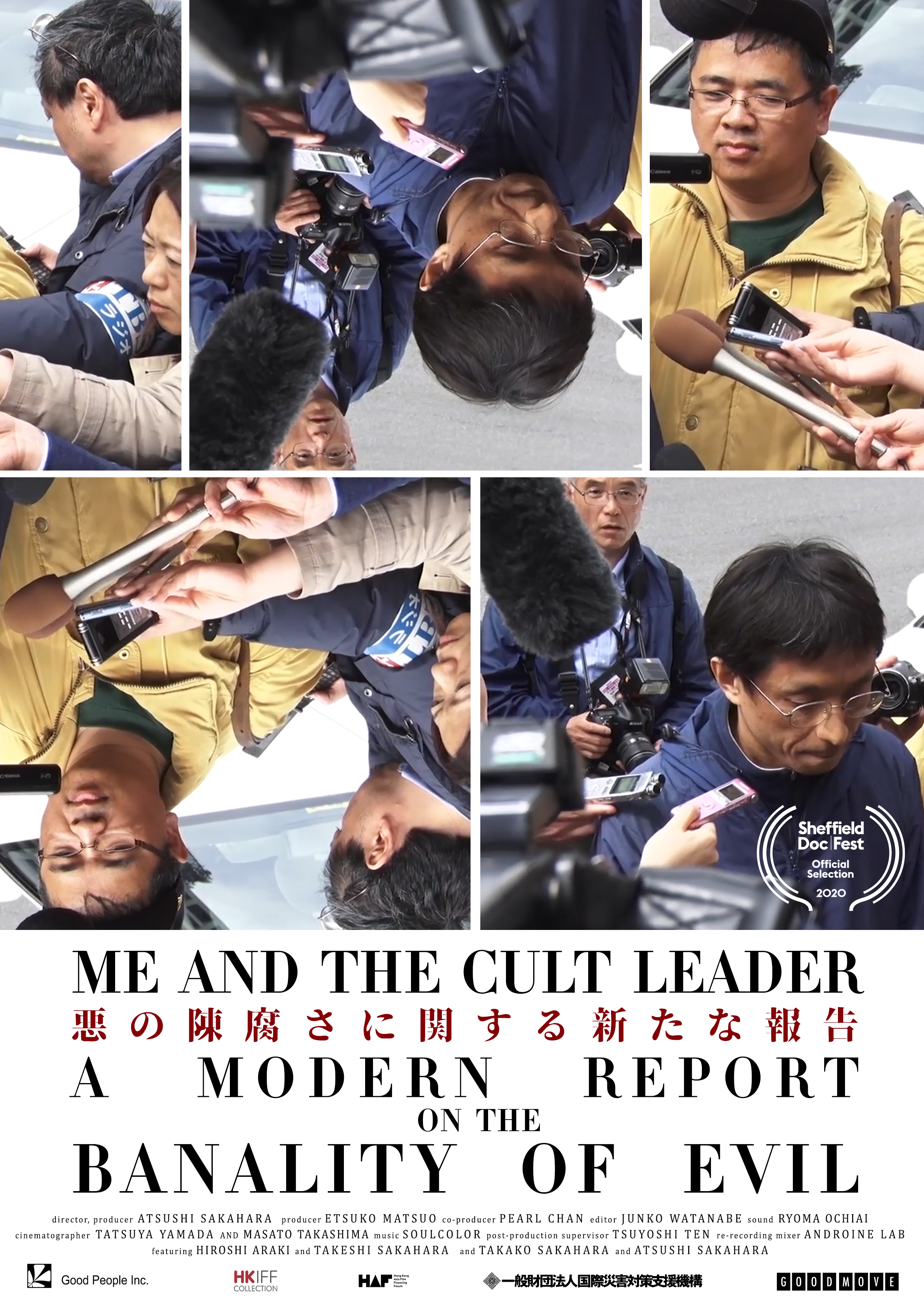
- Film poster
- AGANAI
- Directed by: Atsushi Sakahara
- Produced by: Atsushi Sakahara Etsuko Matsuo Pearl Chan (co-producer)
- Starring: Hiroshi Araki; Takako Sakahara; Takeshi Sakahara; Atsushi Sakahara
- Cinematography: Tatsuya Yamada; Masato Takashima
- Edited by: Junko Watanabe
- Music by: Soulcolour
- Release date: June 10, 2020 (Sheffield)
- Running time: 114 minutes
- Country: Japan
- Language: Japanese

Me and the Cult Leader (Aganai) is a 2020 Japanese documentary film. The film follows the director, Atsushi Sakahara, a victim of the 1995 Tokyo Subway Sarin Gas Attack, and Araki Hiroshi, a current executive member of the doomsday cult Aleph (previously Aum Shinrikyo) behind the attack, as they travel to their hometowns in the Kyoto prefecture. It premiered at the Sheffield Doc Fest as part of its Ghosts and Apparitions strand.

== Plot ==
In 1995, Aum Shinrikyo, a Tokyo-based Doomsday cult, conducted the largest terrorist attack in Japan's history. 13 people were killed and 6000 people were injured as a result of Aum's sarin gas attack perpetrated on three crowded Tokyo subway trains during rush hour on the morning of March 20, 1995. Director Atsushi Sakahara was on one of those cars and has suffered lifelong damage to his nervous system and effects of PTSD as a result. Twenty-years later, Atsushi decides to face the cult.

The film starts after a year spent negotiating the terms of their meeting. Atsushi and Araki, the PR agent and current leader and the cult, finally come together in person. The men begin their journey at the organization's facilities in Tokyo; the space consists of a dojo and residence. Renunciates live and work at the minimalist facilities, practicing an ascetic lifestyle which seeks to limit distractions. Their clothing and food are monochromatic and left intentionally bland; the living space small and shared. Portraits of Aum's leader Asahara, who was on death row at the time of shooting and has since been executed, hang in every room. Throughout the tour, Atsushi questions Araki on the cult's practices, demands, and ideologies.

Atsushi and Araki travel by bullet train to Kyoto, then switching, upon arrival, to board a local train to travel to Atsushi's hometown. As the men pass the stop for Araki's grandmother, uncannily close to Atsushi's own hometown, Araki speaks about her, to whom he was very close. It begins to rain and Araki wipes away tears as the train pulls out of his station. Atsushi brings Araki to his country home. The two discuss religion and how to treat religious principles. Aum's apocalyptic obsession and terrorism stemmed from warped interpretations of "legitimate" religions (namely Western mysticism and Indian Buddhism). Araki believes there is finite suffering in the world and if he were to suffer more, someone else would suffer less. "But do you feel responsible for the suffering Aum has caused?" asks Atsushi.

Atsushi asks Araki more about his family and his childhood. We learn that when Araki was born, he was very sickly and his parents spent a lot of time and money taking care of him. "Why do you think they did that?" Atsushi asks. "Out of a sense of duty," Araki replies, then telling Atsushi about his younger brother who was misdiagnosed with cancer while at university. "I felt completely powerless," Araki tells Atsushi: "I was studying humanities at the time. I could not be helpful and I did not understand why it was happening to my brother. When the cult leader Asahara gave a lecture at Kyoto University later that year, I joined. Later I renounced the world and left my family. It was very difficult, especially for my grandmother who was worried about me."

Their journey takes them to their Alma Mater, Kyoto University, where Araki first saw Shoko Asahara speak. It takes them up to Mount Hiei, a place of many Shinto myths, where they talk about the introduction of Buddhism to Japan. It takes them through the town Araki spent his childhood in a makeshift sightseeing tour. The men go on to meet Atsushi's elderly parents at a cafe. Atsushi's father, Takeshi Sakahara, is a direct and serious police retiree; Takeshi questions Araki on his involvement with the cult and describes his experiences as the father of a victim. Takeshi reveals Atsushi's long-ended marriage, of which the audience has yet to learn. Takeshi condemns Aum unequivocally, telling Araki point-blank that the cult's actions and Araki's beliefs are wrong. After the meal, Atsushi and Araki prepare to part ways at the train station. As they say goodbye, Atsushi pulls out a photo. It's an image of his ex-wife who was once involved in the cult. "Did you know her?" Atsushi asks. Araki takes a look at the photo and shakes his head.

In 2001, Atsushi met and married a woman who confessed that she had been a part of Aum and asked him to not mention his relationship to the attack to her parents. "Let's leave this behind us and leave Japan" she had said. At that time, Atsushi had thought, "life happens to me" and accepted this. But her name had been on a paper in the pocket of one of the men on death row connected to the Tokyo Subway attack, and her visa was denied. As Atsushi's PTSD flared up and tensions grew, the marriage fell apart after a year and a half. Atsushi does not know how involved she ultimately was in the cult.

As the anniversary for the attack draws near, Atsushi accompanies Araki for the annual laying of flowers and hopes that their journey has encouraged him to think independently and apologise for the terrorist attack. Araki side-steps the apology, and later Atsushi's questioning.

The cult's guru, Shoko Asahara and six followers were executed on July 6, 2018. The remaining six followers on death row were executed July 26, 2018. Araki is still part of Aum, now calling itself Aleph, which continues to actively recruit members.

== Cast ==
- Araki Hiroshi as himself
- Takako as herself
- Takeshi Sakahara as himself
- Atsushi Sakahara as himself

== Original soundtrack ==
The original song "SMILE" was created by the Japanese musician Soulcolour.

== Release ==
The film was released in Japan on March 20, 2021 exclusively at the ImageForum cinema in Shibuya, Tokyo. Since then, the film has expanded to other cinemas in Japan. The film will be released on May 26, 2021 in Hong Kong. The Japanese theatrical releases of the film is upcoming.

== Reception ==
On Rotten Tomatoes, the film holds an approval rating of 100% based on 10 reviews, with an average rating of 7.70/10.

=== Film festivals ===
The film has been shown in film festivals worldwide:

Event	Location	Event dates	Category / Notes
Sheffield Doc Fest	Sheffield, UK	June 10, 2020 - July 10, 2020	Ghosts and Apparitions Strand
San Diego Asian Film Festival	San Diego, USA	October 23, 2020 - October 30, 2020	
Jihlava International Documentary Film Festival	Jihlava, Czech Republic	October 27, 2020 - November 8, 2020	Constellations
IDFA	Amsterdam, Netherlands	November 16, 2020 - December 6, 2020	Best of Fests
RIDM	Montreal, Canada	November 19, 2020 - November 25, 2020	
Doc Lisboa	Lisbon, Portugal		
The Hong Kong International Film Festival	Hong Kong	April 1, 2021 - April 12, 2021	
CPH:DOX	Copenhagen, Denmark	April 22, 2021 - May 12, 2021	
Jakarta Film Week	Jakarta, Indonesia	November 18-21, 2021	Global Feature Competition

== Reception ==
The film received acclaim from critics and audiences. The Daily Beast's Nick Schager called it "gripping," and Screen Daily's Lee Marshall called it "rich, thought-provoking and strangely affecting." Eye for Film gave the film four and-a-half stars. Variety reviewed the film out of CPH:DOX as "astonishing Doc Tracks an Impossible Connection Across an Impassable Divide" One Room with a view gave the film four stars out of five. Asia Movie Pulse's Panos Kotzathanasis called it "excellent... brutally sincere." It was included on multiple Top 10 to see at Sheffield Lists, including by Documentary Weekly
