= 2024 Jakarta Film Week =

Film festival edition

- Opening film: Goodbye, Farewell by Adriyanto Dewo
- Closing film: Don't Cry, Butterfly by Dương Diệu Linh
- Location: Jakarta, Indonesia
- Awards: Global Feature Award: Memories of a Burning Body by Antonella Sudassasi Fruniss
- Festival date: 23–27 October 2024
- Website: jakartafilmweek.com

Jakarta Film Week chronology
- 2025 2023

The 2024 Jakarta Film Week, the fourth edition of the film festival Jakarta Film Week, took place from 23 to 27 October 2024 in Jakarta, Indonesia. The festival opened with Adriyanto Dewo's drama film Goodbye, Farewell. It closed with fantasy comedy film Don't Cry, Butterfly by Dương Diệu Linh.

The most prestigious award of the festival, Global Feature Award, was presented to drama film Memories of a Burning Body by Antonella Sudassasi Fruniss.

== Juries ==
The following juries were named for the festival:

=== Global Feature Award ===
- Bradley Liew, filmmaker
- Silvia Wong, editor of Screen International
- Dominique Welinski, film producer

=== Global Short Award ===
- Eric Roux, President of Clermont-Ferrand International Short Film Festival
- Patrick Campos, film scholar and programmer
- Anggun Priambodo, director

=== Global Animation Award ===
- Dion MBD, illustrator and educator
- Gea Rexy, scriptwriter
- Ronny Gani, senior animator

=== Direction Award ===
- June Kim, programmer
- Patrick Mao Huang, film producer
- Andhy Pulung, editor

=== Jakarta Film Fund Award ===
- Agus Mediarta, lecturer
- Al Cossar, artistic director of Melbourne International Film Festival
- Andhika Permata, Head of Tourism and Creative Economy Department of Jakarta

=== Series of the Year ===
- Reza Servia, film producer
- Dian Sasmita, film producer
- Dienan Silmy, film producer

== Official selection ==
=== Opening and closing films ===
English title	Original title	Director(s)	Production countrie(s)
Goodbye, Farewell (opening film)	Sampai Jumpa, Selamat Tinggal	Adriyanto Dewo	Indonesia
Don't Cry, Butterfly (closing film)		Dương Diệu Linh	Vietnam, Singapore, Philippines, Indonesia

=== In competition ===
==== Global Feature ====
English title	Original title	Director(s)	Production countrie(s)
I Saw the TV Glow		Jane Schoenbrun	United States
In the Belly of a Tiger		Jatla Siddartha	India, United States, China, Indonesia, Taiwan
Memoir of a Snail		Adam Elliot	Australia
Memories of a Burning Body	Memorias de un cuerpo que arde	Antonella Sudasassi Furniss	Costa Rica, Spain
The New Year That Never Came	Anul Nou care n-a fost	Bogdan Mureșanu	Romania, Serbia
The Paradise of Thorns	วิมานหนาม	Naruebet Kuno	Thailand

==== Global Short ====
English title	Original title	Director(s)	Production countrie(s)
21 Weeks Later		Nasrin Mohammadpour	Iran
An Orphanage of Memories		Rayit Hashmat Qazi	India
Deliverance	Descarrego	Joana Claude	Brazil
Flail		Ben Gauthier	United States
The Man Who Could Not Remain Silent	Čovjek koji nije mogao šutjeti	Nebojša Slijepčević	Croatia, France, Bulgaria, Slovenia
Oyu		Atsushi Hirai	Japan
Shallot Salad		B.W. Purbanegara	Indonesia
Seeding, Blossoming, Fruiting	像花儿一样	Junsong Ling	China
Shooting Watermelons	Sparare Alle Angurie	Antonio Donato	United Kingdom, Italy
Stranglement		Inoka Palliyaguru	Sri Lanka
Suddenly TV	قناة فجأة	Roopa Gogineni	Qatar, Sudan
Yearning Unveiled	Pencatat Rindu yang Datang di Tengah Malam	Wisnu Surya Pratama	Indonesia

==== Global Animation ====
English title	Original title	Director(s)	Production countrie(s)
A Night at the Rest Area	パーキングエリアの夜	Saki Muramoto	Japan
The Car That Came Back from the Sea	Samochód, który wrócił z morza	Jadwiga Kowalska	Switzerland
Circle	서클	Joung Yu-mi	South Korea
Daisy		Aditi Dixit, Pepot Atienza, Shecit Aguilera	Spain
Ignited		Riri Royanto	Indonesia
It Shouldn't Rain Tomorrow	Amanhã Não Dão Chuva	Maria Trigo Teixeira	Portugal, Germany
Nun or Never!		Heta Jäälinoja	Finland
Percebes		Laura Gonçalves, Alexandra Ramires	Portugal, France
The Skytrain		Joe Chang	Canada
Trumpet Voice	Voz de trompeta	David Monarte Serna, Pilar Smoje Gueico	Chile

=== Direction Award ===
English title	Original title	Director(s)	Production countrie(s)
Cinta Tak Pernah Tepat Waktu		Hanung Bramantyo	Indonesia
Harmony	Harmoni	Yuda Kurniawan	Indonesia
Suzzanna: The Queen of Black Magic		David Gregory	Indonesia
Under the Moonlight	Nur	Tonny Trimarsanto	Indonesia
Yohanna		Razka Robby Ertanto	Indonesia, United Kingdom, Italy

=== Global Feature – Official Selection ===
English title	Original title	Director(s)	Production countrie(s)
All the Songs We Never Sang		Chris Rudz	Japan
Avant-Drag!		Fil Ieropoulos	Greece
Betting with Ghost	Làm Giàu Với Ma	Nhật Trung	Vietnam
Breaking the Cycle	อำนาจ ศรัทธา อนาคต	Aekaphong Saransate, Thankrit Duangmaneeporn	Thailand
Dancing on the Edge of a Volcano		Cyril Aris	Germany, Lebanon
Dog on Trial	Le Procès du Chien	Laetitia Dosch	Switzerland, France
Exhuma	파묘	Jang Jae-hyun	South Korea
Favoriten		Ruth Beckermann	Austria
Green Border	Zielona granica	Agnieszka Holland	Poland, France, Czech Republic, Belgium
Humanist Vampire Seeking Consenting Suicidal Person	Vampire humaniste cherche suicidaire consentant	Ariane Louis-Seize	Canada
Mother Vera		Alys Tomlinson, Cécile Embleton	United Kingdom
You Will Die in 6 Hours	6시간 후 너는 죽는다	Lee Yun-seok	South Korea

=== Fantasea ===
English title	Original title	Director(s)	Production countrie(s)
Chainsaws Were Singing	Mootorsaed laulsid	Sander Maran	Estonia
Idiot Girls and School Ghost: School Anniversary	아메바 소녀들과 학교괴담: 개교기념일	Kim Min-ha	South Korea
Párvulos: Children of the Apocalypse	Párvulos: Hijos del apocalipsis	Isaac Ezban	Mexico
Planet B	Planète B	Aude Léa Rapin	France, Belgium

=== Herstory ===
English title	Original title	Director(s)	Production countrie(s)
A Song Sung Blue	小白船	Geng Zihan	China
Sultana's Dream	El sueño de la sultana	Isabel Herguera	Spain, Germany, India
Toxic	Akiplėša	Saulė Bliuvaitė	Lithuania

=== Family Time ===
English title	Original title	Director(s)	Production countrie(s)
Living Large	Život k sežrání	Kristina Dufková	Czech Republic, France, Slovakia

=== Classique ===
English title	Original title	Director(s)	Production countrie(s)
Buena Vista Social Club (1999)		Wim Wenders	Germany, United States, United Kingdom, France, Cuba
Wings of Desire (1987)	Der Himmel über Berlin	Wim Wenders	West Germany, France
The Devil Oath (1988)	Sumpah Pocong	Ismail Soebardjo	Indonesia

=== Made in Hong Kong ===
English title	Original title	Director(s)	Production countrie(s)
Love Lies	我談的那場戀愛	Ho Miu Ki	Hong Kong
The Remnant	惡人當道	Kwan Man-hin	Hong Kong
Time Still Turns the Pages	年少日記	Nick Cheuk	Hong Kong
Twilight of the Warriors: Walled In	九龍城寨之圍城	Soi Cheang	Hong Kong

=== Series of the Year ===
English title	Original title	Director(s)	Original network
Amara's First Love	Cinta Pertama Ayah	Hadrah Daeng Ratu	Vidio
Induk Gajah (season 2)		Muhadkly Acho	Prime Video
Kawin Tangan		Benni Setiawan	WeTV
Sehati Semati		Yusuf Jacka Ardana	Maxstream TV

=== Jakarta Film Fund ===
English title	Original title	Director(s)
A Date with the Death	Piknik Bersama Maut	Nara Nugroho
Followers		Kevin Rahardjo
If You're Happy I'm Happy		Mauliya Maila

== Awards ==
The following awards were presented at the festival:

- Global Feature Award: Memories of a Burning Body by Antonella Sudassasi Fruniss
- Global Short Award: An Orphanage of Memories by Rayit Hashmat Qazi
- Global Animation Award: It Shouldn't Rain Tomorrow by Maria Trigo Teixeira
- Direction Award: Yohanna by Razka Robby Ertanto
  - Direction Award – Special Mention: Suzzanna: The Queen of Black Magic by David Gregory
- Jakarta Film Fund Award: If You're Happy, I'm Happy by Mauliya Maila
- Series of the Year: Cinta Pertama Ayah by Hadrah Daeng Ratu
