= 2022 Jakarta Film Week =

Film festival

- Opening film: The Ballads of Roy by Fajar Nugros
- Closing film: Arnold Is a Model Student by Sorayos Prapapan
- Location: Jakarta, Indonesia
- Founded: 2021
- Awards: Global Feature Award: Before, Now & Then by Kamila Andini
- No. of films: 88
- Festival date: 13–16 October 2022
- Website: jakartafilmweek.com

Jakarta Film Week chronology
- 2023 2021

The 2022 Jakarta Film Week, the second edition of the film festival Jakarta Film Week, was held on 13 to 16 October 2022. The festival opened with Fajar Nugros' The Ballads of Roy, and closed with Sorayos Prapapan's film Arnold Is a Model Student.

It was held in-person around Central Jakarta at the CGV Grand Indonesia, Ashley Hotel, also a new venue: Kineforum Ismail Marzuki Park, as well as virtual through streaming service Vidio. A total of 88 films from 28 countries were screened during the festival.

The edition presented new award categories: Global Animation Award to the best international animation short film, and Series of the Year to the best Indonesian series produced by over-the-top media service. The most prestigious award of the festival, Global Feature Award, was presented to Indonesian drama film Before, Now & Then, directed by Kamila Andini.

== Juries ==
The following juries were named for the festival.

=== Global Feature Award ===
- Ellen YD Kim, Chief Programmer of Bucheon International Fantastic Film Festival
- Budi Irawanto, academician and President of Jogja-NETPAC Asian Film Festival
- Salman Aristo, producer and screenwriter

=== Direction Award ===
- Wilza Lubis, film producer
- Hilmi Faiq, journalist
- Ernest Prakasa, comedian and filmmaker

=== Global Short Award ===
- Suarina Chua, co-founder of CinemaWorld
- Aditya Ahmad, director
- Umay Shahab, director and actor

=== Global Animation Award ===
- Nurfadli Mursiding, comic creator
- Kuntz Agus, director
- Ryan Adriandhy, animator and illustrator

=== Jakarta Film Fund Award ===
- Mandy Marahimin, film producer
- Andhika Permata, Head of Tourism and Creative Economy Department of Jakarta
- Ginanti Rona, director

=== Series of the Year ===
- Lavesh Samtani, film producer
- Upie Guava, director
- Laila Nurazizah, screenwriter

== Official selection ==
=== Global Feature – Competition ===
English title	Original title	Director(s)	Production countrie(s)
Arnold Is a Model Student (closing film)	อานนเป็นนักเรียนตัวอย่าง	Sorayos Prapapan	Thailand, France, Germany, Netherlands, Singapore
The Ballads of Roy (opening film)	Balada Si Roy	Fajar Nugros	Indonesia
Before, Now & Then‡	Nana	Kamila Andini	Indonesia
Galang		Adriyanto Dewo	Indonesia
Huesera: The Bone Woman†	Huesera	Michelle Garza Cervera	Mexico, Peru
Melchior the Apothecary	Apteeker Melchior	Elmo Nüganen	Estonia, Latvia, Germany
Pink Moon		Floor van der Meulen	Netherlands
Stealing Raden Saleh	Mencuri Raden Saleh	Angga Dwimas Sasongko	Indonesia
Stone Turtle		Woo Ming Jin	Malaysia, Indonesia

Highlighted title and double-dagger (‡) indicates Global Feature Award winner.
Highlighted title and dagger (†) indicates Global Feature Award Special Mention winner.

=== Global Feature – Non Competition ===
English title	Original title	Director(s)	Production countrie(s)
Concerned Citizen	אזרח מודאג	Idan Haguel	Israel
The Conquest of Cartensz	Langkah Bhayangkara Putri	Rahabi Mandra	Indonesia
Fortune Favors Lady Nikuko	漁港の肉子ちゃん	Ayumu Watanabe	Japan
The Innocent	L'Innocent	Louis Garrel	France
Love Destiny: The Movie	บุพเพสันนิวาส ๒	Adisorn Trisirikasem	Thailand
The Night of the Beast	La noche de la bestia	Mauricio Leiva-Cock	Colombia, Mexico
The Show Must Go On		Divya Cowasji	India
Summer Scars	Nos Cérémonies	Simon Rieth	France
The Widow of Kampung Durian	Janda Kampung Durian	Abdul Walid Ali	Malaysia
Wild Roots	Külön falka	Hajni Kis	Hungary, Slovakia

=== Jakarta Film Week × BIFAN ===
A collaboration program between Jakarta Film Week and Bucheon International Fantastic Film Festival.

English title	Original title	Director(s)	Production countrie(s)
Huesera: The Bone Woman	Huesera	Michelle Garza Cervera	Mexico, Peru
Melchior the Apothecary	Apteeker Melchior	Elmo Nüganen	Estonia, Latvia, Germany
Speak No Evil	Gæsterne	Christian Tafdrup	Denmark, Netherlands
Vesper		Kristina Buožytė, Bruno Samper	France, Lithuania, Belgium

=== Series On Screen ===
English title	Original title	Director(s)	Original network(s)
Angling Dharma		Ungke Kaumbur, Wawan Jungut	Maxstream
Doa Mengancam		Hanung Bramantyo, Senoaji Julius	Vidio
Pertaruhan: The Series		Sidharta Tata	Vidio
Royal Blood		Eko Kristianto	Vision+
What We Lose to Love‡	Yang Hilang dalam Cinta	Yandy Laurens	Disney+ Hotstar
Write Me a Love Song		Emil Heradi, Sidharta Tata	Viu

Highlighted title and double-dagger (‡) indicates Series of the Year winner.

== Awards ==
The following awards were presented at the festival:

- Global Feature Award: Before, Now & Then by Kamila Andini
  - Global Feature Special Mention: Huesera: The Bone Woman by Michelle Garza Cervera
- Global Short Award: Nauha by Pratham Khurana
- Global Animation Award: Tankboy by Novella Lian
  - Global Animation Special Mention: Bro Dragon, The City is Under Attack! by Fajar Martha Santosa
- Direction Award: Stealing Raden Saleh by Angga Dwimas Sasongko
- Jakarta Film Fund Award: Bukan Anak Meriam by Nehemia Pareang
- Series of the Year: What We Lose to Love by Yandy Laurens (Disney+ Hotstar)
