= Turang (film) =

- Directed by: Bachtiar Siagian
- Written by: Bachtiar Siagian
- Produced by: Abubakar Abdy
- Starring: Nizmah Zaglulsyah; Omar Bach; Ahmadi Hamid; Hadisjam Tahax; Tuahta Perangin-angin; Zubier Lelo
- Cinematography: Akin
- Production companies: Rentjong Film Corp; Jajasan Gedung Pemuda Medan; Refic Film
- Release date: 1957
- Running time: 87 minutes
- Country: Indonesia
- Language: Indonesian

Turang is a 1957 Indonesian drama film directed by Bachtiar Siagian. The film won four awards at the Indonesian Film Festival in 1960, including Best Film.

== Production ==
Principal photography took place in Desa Seberaya and other villages in Kabanjahe, Karo Regency, North Sumatra, Indonesia, with local people serving as the cast.

== Release ==
Turang was screened at the 1st Afro-Asian Film Festival, held in Tashkent, Uzbekistan in 1958. It was described as "the most celebrated picture" at the festival. Sovexportfilm acquired the film's distribution rights in Soviet Union following its first screening.

After its rediscovery, the film was screened in Desa Seberaya, the location where it was originally shot, in October 2024. It was also presented at the 54th International Film Festival Rotterdam in February 2025. It was also screened in various cities in Indonesia. It was screened at the Jakarta Film Week at the Classique section in October 2025.

It will be screened in the revamped section Crosscut Asia+ of 39th Tokyo International Film Festival in late October 2026.

== Preservation status ==
The film was considered lost during the Soeharto regime due to the Siagian's membership of LEKRA. Researcher and curator Bunga Siagian, had spent a decade trying to rediscover her father's films. In 2022, while participating in Documenta, she met a video artist from Tashkent. She later sought their help in locating the film, as it had once been screened in the city in 1958. Turang was discovered in the Gosfilmofond archive in 2023.

== Accolades ==
Award	Year	Category	Recipient	Result
Indonesian Film Festival	1960	Best Film	Turang	Won
Indonesian Film Festival	1960	Best Director	Bachtiar Siagian	Won
Indonesian Film Festival	1960	Best Supporting Actor	Achmadi Hamid	Won
Indonesian Film Festival	1960	Best Art Direction		Won
