= No Title =

2021 Canadian short film directed by Alexandra Myotte

- French: Pas de titre
- Directed by: Alexandra Myotte
- Written by: Alexandra Myotte
- Produced by: Alexandra Myotte; Jean-Sébastien Hamel
- Narrated by: Jean-Sébastien Hamel
- Edited by: Jean-Sébastien Hamel
- Production company: Sémaphore Films
- Release date: August 5, 2021 (Fantasia)
- Running time: 9 minutes
- Country: Canada
- Language: French

No Title (French: Pas de titre) is a Canadian animated short film, directed by Alexandra Myotte and released in 2021. The film centers on a reporter who is searching for a woman who was purportedly abducted by aliens, only to discover and become fascinated by Louisiane Gervais, a blind sculptor.

The film premiered at the 2021 Fantasia Film Festival.

== Awards ==
Year	Award	Category	Result	Ref.
2022	Prends ça court	Prix Ottoblix/Unité Centrale	Won	
2022	Sommets du cinéma d'animation	Best Character (Louisiane Gervais)	Won	
2022	Prix Iris	Best Animated Short Film	Nominated	
2023	Festival Plein(s) écran(s)	Coup de cœur	Won	
