= Ma Aeint =

Burmese film producer and writer

- မအိမ့်
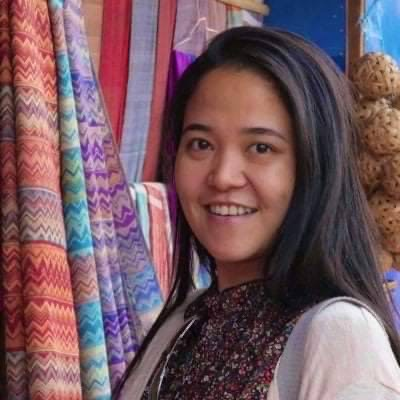
- Occupations: Film producer; writer
- Known for: Writing and producing Money Has Four Legs

Ma Aeint (Burmese: မအိမ့်) is a Burmese filmmaker and writer, best known for her 2020 film, Money Has Four Legs.

In the wake of the 2021 Myanmar coup d'état, she was detained by the military junta on 5 June 2021 at Insein Prison, after becoming a target of the junta for her involvement in Money Has Four Legs. While in custody, her legs were reportedly broken by interrogation authorities. In April 2022, she was sentenced under section 505A of Myanmar's Penal Code to 3 years of hard labour, after pleading not guilty. She was released from Tharyarwaddy Prison on 3 May 2023.

Her sentencing was condemned by PEN America and the international filmmaking community, including the International Coalition for Filmmakers at Risk, the Directors Guild of Japan, eleven South Korean film festivals led by the Busan International Film Festival, and Southeast Asia Fiction Film Lab. In September 2022, actress Julianne Moore led a flash-mob protest at the 79th Venice International Film Festival, calling for the release of Ma Aeint and other imprisoned filmmakers.
