= Bleat! =

Malaysian-French-Filipino comedic drama short film

- Tamil promotional poster
- Tamil: கத்து!
- Directed by: Ananth Subramaniam
- Written by: Ananth Subramaniam
- Produced by: Choo Mun Bel; Bradley Liew; Dominique Welinski
- Starring: Tharmasegaran Maniam; Pannerselvam Evarani
- Cinematography: Adrian Wong
- Edited by: Gogularaajan Rajendran; BK Lee
- Production companies: Sixtymac Pictures; Epicmedia Productions; DW
- Release date: May 2025 (Cannes)
- Running time: 15 minutes
- Countries: Malaysia; France; Philippines
- Language: Tamil

Bleat! (Tamil: கத்து! or Kattu!) is a 2025 Malaysian-French-Filipino comedy-drama short film written and directed by Ananth Subramaniam. It stars Tharmasegaran Maniam, Pannerselvam Evarani, Dhanesh Alagarsu, and Charvine Mailvaganam.

The film had its world premiere in the Critics' Week section of the 2025 Cannes Film Festival, where it won the Queer Palm for Best Short Film. It is the first short film from Malaysia selected for the festival.

== Plot ==
A male goat belonging to a Malaysian-Tamil couple is discovered to be pregnant before it is meant to be ceremonially slaughtered. The couple seek out the truth of the situation to avoid punishment from Karuppuswamy.

== Cast ==
- Tharmasegaran Maniam as Marapan
- Pannerselvam Evarani as Papa
- Dhanesh Alagarsu as Goat Head
- Charvine Mailvaganam as Veter
- Big Boy as the goat

== Production ==
Ananth Subramaniam was inspired to create Bleat! by the notion of dropping a pregnant goat into a rigid world. Directed by Subramaniam, Bleat! was a co-production between Sixtymac Pictures of Malaysia, Epicmedia Productions of the Philippines, and DW of France. It received funding from the Singapore International Film Festival's Short Film Fund and Singapore's Momo Distribution Grant.

Shot in black-and-white, all of the filming was done in Banting, Malaysia. Shooting was done in black-and-white as Subramaniam felt that "it brings the story closer to reality" and "strips the world down". Subramaniam was inspired by the works of G. Aravindan, Sam Shepard, and Kelly Reichardt. Collaborators included Adrian Wong as cinematographer and Gogularaajan Rajendran as editor. Post-production work was done by Om Shakthi Films and Om Shakthi Films, colour grading by White Light Post Bangkok in Thailand, sound post-production by dbStudios in Lebanon.

Subramaniam stated that an "unspoken rule" about being a minority is that "as long as you behave like a goat, everything's fine", but whenever "that goat shows desire, independence, or steps beyond its little patch of farmland, everything around it starts trembling."

== Release ==
Hors du Bocal, a Belgian company, is handling the international distribution rights. Four feature films from Malaysia have been shown at the Cannes Film Festival, and Bleat! will compete at the 2025 Cannes Film Festival in Critics' Week, being the first Malaysian short film shown at the festival.

== Accolades ==
Award	Date of ceremony	Category	Recipient(s)	Result	Ref.
Cannes Film Festival	2025	Queer Palm	Ananth Subramaniam	Won	
Singapore International Film Festival	7 December 2025	Best Southeast Asian Short Film	Ananth Subramaniam	Nominated	
Singapore International Film Festival	7 December 2025	Best Director	Ananth Subramaniam	Won	
Clermont-Ferrand International Short Film Festival	7 February 2026	Student Prize	Ananth Subramaniam	Won	
Jakarta Film Week	25 October 2026	Global Short Award	Ananth Subramaniam	Won	

== Works cited ==
- "Palmarès 2026". Ça suit son court. 8 February 2026.
- "Ananth Subramaniam: Tamils have a culture of acceptance". The New Indian Express. 4 June 2025. Archived from the original on 5 June 2025.
- Nawawi, Nikita (28 April 2025). "Ananth Subramaniam on Taking 'Bleat!' To Cannes Film Festival". Buro. Archived from the original on 3 May 2025.
- Ragu, Theevya (22 April 2025). "Malaysian Short 'Bleat!' Makes History at Cannes Critics' Week". Free Malaysia Today.
- Ramachandran, Naman (17 April 2025). "Malaysian Short 'Bleat!' Makes History at Cannes Critics' Week". Variety. Archived from the original on 29 April 2025.
- Ramachandran, Naman (7 December 2025b). "'Always,' 'Riverstone' Win Top Prizes at Singapore Film Festival". Variety.
- Shackleton, Liz (5 May 2025). "'Bleat'! Trailer: Story Of Couple's Ethical Dilemma Is First Malaysian Short To Screen In Cannes". Deadline Hollywood. Archived from the original on 5 May 2025.
