= Filipiñana =

2026 drama film by Rafael Manuel

- International promotional poster
- Directed by: Rafael Manuel
- Written by: Rafael Manuel
- Produced by: Bianca Balbuena; Jeremy Chua; Omar El Kadi; Bradley Liew; Rafael Manuel; Alex Polunin; Nadia Turincev
- Starring: Jorrybell Agoto; Carmen Castellanos; Teroy Guzman; Carlos Siguion-Reyna; Isabel Sicat; Nour Hooshmand
- Cinematography: Xenia Patricia
- Edited by: Rafael Manuel
- Production companies: Film4; Potocol; Ossian International; Epicmedia; Easy Riders Films; Idle Eye; Nathan Studios
- Distributed by: Fortune Arts International Films (Philippines); BFI Distribution (United Kingdom)
- Release dates: 23 January 2026 (Sundance); 26 August 2026 (Philippines); 20 November 2026 (United Kingdom)
- Running time: 101 minutes
- Countries: United Kingdom; Philippines; Singapore; France; Netherlands
- Languages: Filipino; English; Ilocano
- Box office: $445,584

Filipiñana is a 2026 black comedy drama film written and directed by Rafael Manuel in his feature film debut, which expands upon his 2020 Silver Bear-winning thesis short film. The film examines post-colonial class disparities through 17-year-old Isabel (Jorrybell Agoto) as she works as a "tee-girl" on a sweltering day at a posh golf course in the Philippines.

The film premiered at the 2026 Sundance Film Festival on January 23, where it won the Special Jury Award for Creative Vision, and had its European premiere at the Perspective section of the 76th Berlin International Film Festival on February 15.

Filipiñana was theatrically released in the Philippines on August 26, 2026 and in the United States on August 28, 2026, breaking Film Forum's biggest opening weekend of the decade. It received widespread praise from critics and was selected as the Philippine entry for the Best International Feature Film at the 99th Academy Awards.

== Plot ==
The film opens in a drought-stricken district of Metro Manila, where a country club's service van carrying Chinese guests nearly collides with a crowd of residents queuing for rationed water.

Seventeen-year-old Isabel works as a "tee-girl" at the country club's exclusive, heavily irrigated golf course. She and her fellow tee-girls, all young women in pastel-blue uniforms, are tasked with setting golf balls on the tee for their wealthy patrons so the golfers need not bend down themselves. Alongside them are the caddies, women in pink uniforms and salakot-like hats who retrieve stray balls, including from the course's retention pond. While their supervisor and the golfers enjoy air-conditioned comfort, the tee-girls sleep cramped together despite the hot weather with only electric fans and meager food rations.

A newbie in the job, Isabel is soon assigned to the country club's president, Dr. Palanca. Discovering they share Ilocano roots, Palanca speaks to Isabel in Ilocano and offers his help should she need it, sparking in her an inexplicable fascination with him. Meanwhile, Clara, recently returned from studying in New York, is brought to the club by her uncle, who hopes she will join his golf equipment business and help curb the "brain drain." Disturbed by the subservient treatment of the caddies, Clara is hesitant to accept her uncle's offer.

Isabel is warned by Dr. Palanca's caddie, whom she had also seen earlier asleep with Palanca, that the country club is not safe and that Palanca is not as kind as he seems. Isabel is given a golf club Palanca accidentally left behind and sets out to return it. She wanders through the complex, encountering his dismissive wife, a nanny searching for a missing girl (marked by a dragonfly hairpin), and a fellow tee-girl who catches her touching food left by the guests. Sneaking into a bathing area, she overhears Palanca and Clara's uncle patronizingly discussing his family's land holdings in Ilocos, nearly taken under the 1988 agrarian reform program.

Isabel eventually locates a sleeping Dr. Palanca in his office. She watches through the window as workers fell a pine tree and load it onto a truck bearing Palanca's face—the same kind of truck, she recalls, that was once used to violently evict her own family from their land to make way for development. Realizing Palanca's family was responsible, she raises his golf club as if to strike the sleeping man but ultimately stops herself. Outside, Clara goes into a thicket to retrieve a misfired golf ball to avoid ordering her caddie around. There, she finds the dragonfly hairpin, the missing girl's corpse, and a bloodied golf ball (implied to be the one she was seeking). Clara's uncle callously orders a caddie to help him dump the child's cadaver into the retention pond and drives a shaken Clara away.

Wandering the grounds, Isabel reaches the pond and discovers the discarded body. Her cries for help go unanswered, and as the end credits begin, she wades into the water in an apparent attempt to recover the child, while golfers continue their game in the foreground and the truck hauling the felled pine passes in the background. She does not resurface before the film cuts to black.

== Cast ==
- Jorrybell Agoto as Isabel
- Carmen Castellanos as Clara
- Teroy Guzman as Dr. Palanca
- Carlos Siguion-Reyna as Renato
- Isabel Sicat as Ina
- Nour Hooshmand as Janine
- Ruby Ruiz as Tata
- Pipay Kipay as Tour Guide/Dolly
- Agot Isidro as Maribel
- Angeli Bayani as Beth
- Shamaine Buencamino as Imelda

== Production ==
=== Development ===
The film is an international co-production film between the Philippines, Singapore, United Kingdom, France, and Netherlands. Filipiñana was written by Rafael Manuel in 2018 during his time at film school, originally as a feature film screenplay, before deciding to build a profile for the film to secure funding by first producing a short film based on it. The short film served as Manuel's thesis film at the London Film School, which premiered at the 2020 Berlin International Film Festival and won the Silver Bear for Best Short Film. Producer Jeremy Chua of Potocol and Manuel were introduced by their mutual film teacher Gisli Snaer Erlingsson at the 2020 Berlinale.

Potocol and Epicmedia presented the film at the Busan Asian Project Market in October 2023. In February 2024, Magnify announced its acquisition of the film's global sales rights while Film4 boarded the project as producer. Jia Zhangke joined as an executive producer after meeting Manuel for a two-year mentorship program sponsored by Rolex. Zhangke's company, Unknown Pleasures Pictures, acquired the distribution rights for the film in Mainland China, Hong Kong, Macau, and Taiwan.

The film is supported by the Cinéfondation La Residence du Festival de Cannes, with Jeremy Chua, Alex Polunin, Bianca Balbuena, Bradley Liew, Nadia Turincev and Omar El Kadi as producers.

=== Filming ===
Principal photography began during the first half of 2024. The film, set at a fictional golf and country club located in Manila, was actually filmed in various golf clubs near the city including the Caliraya Springs Golf Club in Laguna, and the Mount Malarayat Golf and Country Club in Batangas. Executive producer Jia Zhangke was present on set during the first week of principal photography.

== Themes and interpretations ==
The primary themes of Filipiñana are structural violence and postcolonialism. The title of the film refers to the concept of Filipiniana, which is the study of artifacts related to the history, culture, and society of the Philippines. Rafael Manuel examines these through the use of a golf course as a microcosm that reflects the macrocosm of the Filipino social and political context. He notes that while golf is an unexpected symbol for the country, it serves as a fitting analogy because the sport and golf courses became popular when the country became an American territory in 1898.

The physical design of the course reflects processes of gentrification and colonialism: uncultivated land is tamed, manicured, and sanitized for elite leisure, institutionalizing class power while marginalizing the labor force that maintains it. This setting mirrors broader social stratification through a strict labor hierarchy, visually marked by distinct uniforms and hyper-specific roles. At the bottom are the "tee girls", whose only job is to place golf balls on tees so golfers don't have to bend down. Manuel points out that this setup relies on the region's cheap, abundant labor, leaving workers spending hours in idle silence just to serve elite patrons. Critics such as Richard Brody highlight this setting, praising the film for coaxing out the cruelty of the resort's hierarchies while also capturing the insidious tension between luxury and labor.

Another central theme is intense tropical heat and its connection to societal inaction. Manuel uses the suffocating heat, along with the slow pacing of the film, to create a feeling of paralysis, suggesting that extreme heat contributes to political passivity and a lack of resistance in the Philippines. In this context, golf works as an analogy for inaction, since the goal of the game is to take as few strokes as possible. Drawing from Hannah Arendt's concept of freedom as political action, the film shows that taking action is the only way to break a cycle of oppression. This climate-induced paralysis is contrasted through the main characters, Isabel and Clara. While Clara chooses to eventually ignore the reality around her, Isabel's journey, starting with her opening her eyes in the first frame and ending with her running and swimming, represents a deliberate awakening toward taking action.

Another frequently discussed element of the film's interpretation is its unconventional structure, specifically the "false ending." In a bold move, the end credits begin to roll earlier than expected. During the film's premiere, there were reports of audience members clapping and leaving for their next screening, unknowingly missing the film's true conclusion. This reaction was described by Manuel as "crazy", noting the irony of the situation. Viewers who believed the experience is over feel entitled to walk away, exactly like the elite characters in the film who choose to ignore the suffering of the working class once their "performance" or "service" is no longer required.

== Release ==
Filipiñana premiered in the World Cinema Dramatic Competition at the 2026 Sundance Film Festival on 23 January, where it won the Special Jury Award for Creative Vision. It had its European premiere at the 76th Berlin International Film Festival on 15 February, where the short film on which it is based also premiered in 2020.

The film premiered in the Philippines on 18 August as the closing film for the 2026 Cinemalaya Film Festival. Elsewhere, it was also programmed at the San Francisco International Film Festival, Independent Film Festival Boston, New York Asian Film Festival, and Hawai'i International Film Festival in the United States; Vancouver International Film Festival and Calgary International Film Festival in Canada; Adelaide Film Festival, Melbourne International Film Festival, and Sydney Film Festival in Australia; Valencia International Film Festival in Spain; São Paulo International Film Festival in Brazil; Bangkok International Film Festival in Thailand; Busan International Film Festival in South Korea; Tokyo International Film Festival in Japan; and BFI London Film Festival in the United Kingdom.

Magnify launched the international sales of the film at the European Film Market. The film's distribution in the United States and Canada is handled by Kinor Lorber, while BFI Distribution is scheduled to release the film in theaters in the United Kingdom and Ireland on 20 November. Jia Zhangke's company, Unknown Pleasures Pictures, acquired the distribution rights for the film in Mainland China, Hong Kong, Macau, and Taiwan. It was released theatrically in the Philippines on 26 August. On 28 August, the film was released in the Film Forum in New York where it broke the venue's biggest opening weekend of the decade.

== Reception ==
=== Critical response ===
On review aggregation website Rotten Tomatoes, 91% of 54 critics' reviews are positive, with an average rating of 8.3/10. The website’s consensus reads: "A visually immaculate yet increasingly sinister post-colonial satire, Filipiñana meticulously constructs a microcosm of privilege, decay, and the deep social rot lurking beneath its polished surfaces." On Metacritic, the film has a score of 82 out of 100, based on reviews from 12 critics, indicating "universal acclaim".

Several critics compared the film to Wes Anderson. Jordan Mintzer of THR praises the film's darkly comic tone and visuals, positively comparing them to Michael Haneke and David Lynch. IndieWire critic David Ehrlich also sees similarities to Haneke's filmography, noting: "The director shoots the place with a Haneke-like remove that makes every member, caddie, and Chinese tourist feel like they're conspiring to bury an awful secret of some kind". Bilge Ebiri of Vulture praises Manuel's direction and describes "heightened control of imagery and mood, attention to composition and texture and sound". Chase Hutchinson of TheWrap praises the film, believes it's a "cutting, confident, and ultimately formally captivating feature debut".

Writing for ABS-CBN News, Fred Hawson praised the film, reflecting on the pacing of the movie: "a deliberate metaphor of the frustrating snail's pace at which our country is progressing (or not)".

=== Accolades ===
Award	Date of ceremony	Category	Recipient(s)	Result	Ref.
Belgrade International Film Festival	14 October 2026	Best Director (World Competition)	Rafael Manuel	Won	
Berlin International Film Festival	22 February 2026	Best First Feature	Rafael Manuel	Nominated	
Gotham Independent Film Awards	30 November 2026	Best International Feature	Rafael Manuel, Bianca Balbuena, Jeremy Chua, Omar El Kadi, Bradley Liew, Rafael Manuel, Alex Polunin, Nadia Turincev	Pending	
Independent Film Festival Boston	27 April 2026	Grand Jury Prize for Best Narrative Feature	Filipiñana	Won	
Jakarta Film Week	25 October 2026	Global Feature Award	Filipiñana	Won	
Kyiv International Film Festival	1 November 2026	Best Feature Film	Filipiñana	Won	
Pingyao International Film Festival	30 September 2026	Roberto Rossellini Award for Best Director	Rafael Manuel	Won	
Pingyao International Film Festival	30 September 2026	Roberto Rossellini Award for Best Film	Filipiñana	Nominated	
Sundance Film Festival	1 February 2026	Special Jury Award for Creative Vision (World Cinema)	Filipiñana	Won	
Sundance Film Festival	1 February 2026	Grand Jury Prize for Dramatic Features (World Cinema)	Filipiñana	Nominated	
San Francisco International Film Festival	5 May 2026	New Directors Award	Rafael Manuel	Won	
Valencia International Film Festival	20 April 2026	Best Feature Film	Filipiñana	Won	

== See also ==
- List of submissions to the 99th Academy Awards for Best International Feature Film
- List of Philippine submissions for the Academy Award for Best International Feature Film
