= Pipay Kipay =

Filipino comedian, vlogger, and actor

- Born: John Paul Joseph Santos; Philippines
- Occupations: Actor; model; vlogger; comedian; influencer; singer
- Years active: 2020–present

John Paul Joseph Santos, also known as Pipay Kipay and mononymously as Pipay, is a Filipino content creator, vlogger, comedian, and social media personality. She rose to prominence during the COVID-19 pandemic through viral videos on the mobile app TikTok, where her comedic skits and socially aware content gained widespread attention.

== Early life and background ==
Pipay Kipay was born with congenital hand deformities, which led to bullying during her school years. According to her, she did not experience discrimination in her neighborhood growing up, but began to face difficulties upon entering school. Over time, she rebuilt her confidence by embracing her condition and using it as a source of strength.

Before becoming a content creator, she participated in youth organizations in her school and community, where discussions on social issues influenced her interest in pursuing communication-related studies.

== Career ==
=== Rise on social media ===
Pipay began gaining online attention in 2020 during the COVID-19 pandemic, when TikTok usage surged. One of her early viral videos featured a fictional character named "Juswa," which became a recurring element in her content and significantly boosted her popularity.

Her content are usually combines humor with commentary on relatable and social issues. She also released a novelty parody song titled "Talong Ni Juswa," which further increased her visibility online. By 2021, she had amassed millions of followers across social media platforms.

=== Television appearances ===
Pipay made her television debut through the GMA Network program Wish Ko Lang!, appearing on its anniversary episode in 2021 alongside established actors. She later returned for another episode of the program.

In 2022, Pipay also appeared as a celebrity guest player on the game show Family Feud, where she and fellow TikTok creators won a jackpot prize of ₱200,000.

Pipay is one of the supporting casts of the television action series Black Rider as Apol Pie.

=== Other activities ===
In 2020, Pipay participated in campaigns promoting mental health awareness and positive messaging through online initiatives. She has also collaborated with brands and participated in promotional campaigns, including livestream events that garnered significant online engagement.

== Personal life ==
Pipay has publicly identified as transgender and has shared aspects of her personal journey and identity in interviews. She has also been involved in advocacy campaigns supporting LGBTQ+ visibility and equality.

== Political views ==
During the 2022 Philippine general elections, Pipay expressed support for then–Vice President Leni Robredo and participated in campaign-related activities.

== Discography ==
=== Singles ===
Year	Title	Artist(s)	Ref.
2020	"Talong Ni Juswa"	Pipay Kipay	
2020	"Sayaw Pipay"	Pipay Kipay	

== Filmography ==
=== TV series ===
Year	Title	Role	Ref.
2021	Wish Ko Lang!	Guest actor	
2022	Family Feud	Player	
2023–2024	Black Rider	Apol Pie	

=== Film ===
Year	Title	Role	Ref.
2026	Filipiñana	Dolly/Tour Guide	

=== Music video appearances ===
Year	Title	Singer/Artist	Ref.
2020	"Talong Ni Juswa"	Pipay Kipay	
2020	"Sayaw Pipay"	Pipay Kipay	
