= Before, Now & Then =

- Indonesian: Nana
- Directed by: Kamila Andini
- Written by: Kamila Andini
- Based on: Jais Darga Namaku by Ahda Imran
- Produced by: Ifa Isfansyah; Gita Fara
- Starring: Happy Salma; Laura Basuki
- Cinematography: Batara Goempar
- Edited by: Akhmad Fesdi Anggoro
- Music by: Ricky Lionardi
- Production companies: Fourcolours Films; Titimangsa Foundation
- Distributed by: Wild Bunch
- Release date: 12 February 2022 (Berlinale)
- Running time: 103 minutes
- Country: Indonesia
- Language: Sundanese
- Box office: $45,632

Before, Now & Then (Indonesian title: Nana) is a 2022 Indonesian period drama film, written and directed by Kamila Andini. It stars Happy Salma as Nana, a woman who is impacted by violent times in rural Indonesia during 1940s to 1960s. The film is adapted from the first chapter of the novel Jais Darga Namaku (lit. 'My Name Is Jais Darga') by Ahda Imran, telling the true story of Raden Nana Sunani, a woman who lived in the 1960s West Java.

The film had its world premiere at the 72nd Berlin International Film Festival in February 2022. Basuki was awarded Silver Bear for Best Supporting Performance for her performance as Ino.

== Premise ==
Set in West Java, Nana finds refuge in a second marriage after losing her family to war in the 1940s. Then, she befriends her second husband's mistress, Ino, together seeking for the meaning of freedom.

== Cast ==
- Happy Salma as Nana
- Laura Basuki as Ino
- Arswendy Bening Swara as Mr. Darga
- Ibnu Jamil as Raden Icang
- Rieke Diah Pitaloka as Ningsih
- Arawinda Kirana as Dais
  - Chempa Puteri as young Dais

== Production ==
The principal photography of Before, Now & Then began in March 2021 in Ciwidey, Bandung, West Java.

The film won the CJ ENM Award at the 2021 Asian Project Market Awards during the 26th Busan International Film Festival, winning $10,000 in cash. It also received a post-production grant of $50,000 from Purin Pictures in November 2021.

== Release ==
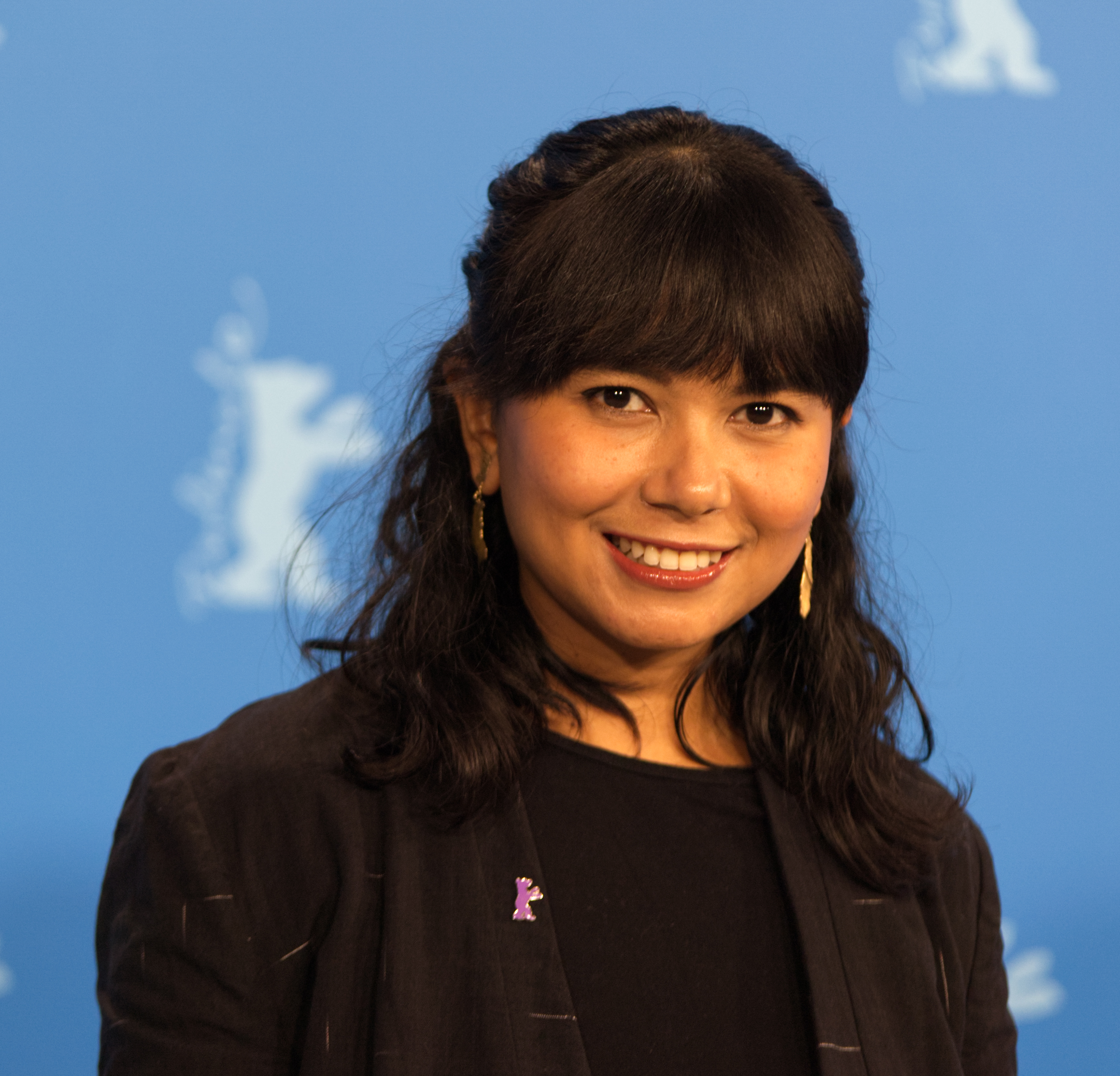
Andini at the 72nd Berlin International Film Festival.

The film had its world premiere in competition at the 72nd Berlin International Film Festival on 12 February 2022. Before that, Wild Bunch acquired distribution rights to the film in January 2022. The North American distribution rights was acquired by Film Movement in August 2022.

The film was distributed in Indonesia through streaming service Amazon Prime Video on 1 August 2022. The film was released theatrically in South Korea on 15 December 2022. The film received 6,763 admissions during its run in European theatres.

== Reception ==
=== Box office ===
As of 2 September 2023, Before, Now & Then has grossed $43,697 worldwide. The film has grossed $6,251 in South Korea.

=== Critical reception ===
On the review aggregator website Rotten Tomatoes, 100% of 16 critics' reviews are positive, with an average rating of 7.5/10. Metacritic, which uses a weighted average, assigned the film a score of 70 out of 100, based on 8 critics, indicating "generally favorable" reviews.

Leslie Felperin of The Hollywood Reporter described the film as "an intoxicating, slow-burn melodrama" and praised Batara Goempar's cinematography and Ricky Lionardi's score, calling it "above and beyond". Writing for Variety, Michael Nordine compared the film to the work of Wong Kar-wai and Apichatpong Weerasethakul, stating, "[...] moves with its own dreamy cadence, with narrative developments washing over the film like waves". Wendy Ide of Screen International lauded Salma's performance and described the film as "a handsomely mounted period piece, which acknowledges the strength required by previous generations of Indonesian women to rise above the patriarchal demands of a restrictive society". Rory O'Connor at The Film Stage gave the film a 'B' grade and called it "begins with a ruthless decapitation, it is relentlessly well-mannered: all ointment, no flies".

== Accolades ==
Award	Date	Category	Recipient	Result	Ref.
Berlin International Film Festival	10–20 February 2022	Golden Bear	Kamila Andini	Nominated	
Berlin International Film Festival	10–20 February 2022	Silver Bear for Best Supporting Performance	Laura Basuki	Won	
Jakarta Film Week	16 October 2022	Global Feature Award	Before, Now & Then	Won	
Asia Pacific Screen Awards	11 November 2022	Best Film	Before, Now & Then	Won	
Asia Pacific Screen Awards	11 November 2022	Best Director	Kamila Andini	Nominated	
Asia Pacific Screen Awards	11 November 2022	Best Performance	Happy Salma	Nominated	
Asia Pacific Screen Awards	11 November 2022	Best Cinematography	Batara Goempar	Nominated	
Indonesian Film Festival	22 November 2022	Best Picture	Ifa Isfansyah and Gita Fara	Won	
Indonesian Film Festival	22 November 2022	Best Director	Kamila Andini	Nominated	
Indonesian Film Festival	22 November 2022	Best Actress	Happy Salma	Nominated	
Indonesian Film Festival	22 November 2022	Best Supporting Actress	Laura Basuki	Nominated	
Indonesian Film Festival	22 November 2022	Best Adapted Screenplay	Kamila Andini and Ahda Imran	Nominated	
Indonesian Film Festival	22 November 2022	Best Cinematography	Batara Goempar	Won	
Indonesian Film Festival	22 November 2022	Best Editing	Akhmad Fesdi Anggoro	Won	
Indonesian Film Festival	22 November 2022	Best Original Score	Ricky Lionardi	Won	
Indonesian Film Festival	22 November 2022	Best Production Design	Vida Sylvia	Won	
Indonesian Film Festival	22 November 2022	Best Costume Design	Retno Ratih Damayanti	Nominated	
Indonesian Film Festival	22 November 2022	Best Makeup	Eba Sheba	Nominated	
Film Pilihan Tempo	18 December 2022	Film Pilihan Tempo	Before, Now & Then	Nominated	
Film Pilihan Tempo	18 December 2022	Best Director	Kamila Andini	Won	
Film Pilihan Tempo	18 December 2022	Best Screenplay	Kamila Andini and Ahda Imran	Nominated	
Film Pilihan Tempo	18 December 2022	Best Actress	Happy Salma	Won	
Film Pilihan Tempo	18 December 2022	Best Supporting Actress	Laura Basuki	Won	
Asian Film Awards	12 March 2023	Best Actress	Happy Salma	Nominated	
Asian Film Awards	12 March 2023	Best Supporting Actress	Laura Basuki	Nominated	
Asian Film Awards	12 March 2023	Best Cinematography	Batara Goempar	Nominated	
Asian Film Awards	12 March 2023	Best Costume Design	Retno Ratih Damayanti	Nominated	
Asian Film Awards	12 March 2023	Best Production Design	Vida Sylvia Theresia	Nominated	
