= A Crab in the Pool =

2023 Canadian short film directed by Alexandra Myotte and Jean-Sébastien Hamel

- French: Un trou dans la poitrine
- Directed by: Alexandra Myotte; Jean-Sébastien Hamel
- Written by: Alexandra Myotte; Jean-Sébastien Hamel
- Produced by: Alexandra Myotte; Jean-Sébastien Hamel
- Starring: Élisabeth Gauthier-Pelletier; Jean-Sébastien Hamel
- Edited by: Jean-Sébastien Hamel
- Production company: Sémaphore Films
- Release date: September 5, 2023 (Fantoche)
- Running time: 11 minutes
- Country: Canada
- Language: French

A Crab in the Pool (French: Un trou dans la poitrine) is a 2023 Canadian animated short film about hardship and grief, directed by Alexandra Myotte and Jean-Sébastien Hamel. The film premiered at the 2023 Fantoche animation film festival in September 2023, and has received several nominations and awards, including the Best Canadian Animation Award at the 2023 Ottawa International Animation Festival and the Audience Awards for Best Animated Short at the 2024 South by South West Festival (SXSW). On December 17, 2024, A Crab in the Pool was shortlisted for the 97th Academy Awards in the category of Best Animated Short Film.

The short film is available to watch on Vimeo.

== Summary ==
Zoé is a teenage girl hanging with the wrong crowd, and her younger brother Théo frequently imagines the people he sees as the characters from his colouring book of Greek myths. Zoé is annoyed by Théo's imagination as it often causes his to make messes.

During one hot summer afternoon, Zoé and Théo go to the public swimming pool to cool off. Upon changing into her bathing suit in the women's bathroom, Zoé hallucinates her body changing against her will, even pulling a crab out of her body and crushing it with her foot. At the main pool, Théo imagines Zoé as a snake-haired Gorgon, prompting her to slap him back into reality. Shocked at what she has done, Zoé rushes back into the women's bathroom; she then remembers her mother, who remained positive even after becoming bald and having her left breast removed. Back at the pool, Théo also remembers his mother who had given him his colouring book and informed him of the Amazons, the mythological warrior women who were said to remove their breasts to become better archers. When asked if she would fight until the end, Zoé and Théo's mother promised she would.

It is eventually revealed that the two siblings' mother had actually died of breast cancer: Zoé's acting out and Théo's imagination have been their coping mechanisms in dealing with her death. As the siblings sit together by the edge of the pool, they tearfully embrace as they remember their late mother.

== Awards ==
Year	Award	Category	Result	Ref.
2023	Ottawa International Animation Festival	Best Canadian Animation	Won	
2023	Festival International du Film Francophone de Namur	Best Direction, Short Film Competition	Won	
2023	Cinemania	Best Short Film	Won	
2023	Giant Incandescent Resonating Animation Festival	Best Canadian Animation	Won	
2024	South by Southwest	Audience Award, Animated Shorts	Won	
2024	Sommets du cinéma d'animation	Grand-Prix Guy L. Côté	Won	
2024	Animest Festival	Grand Prize	Won	
2024	Short Shorts Film Festival	Best Short Film, Animation	Won	
2024	Animation Is Film	Special Jury Prize	Won	
2024	Prix Iris	Best Animated Short Film	Won	
2025	Prix collégial du cinéma québécois	Best Short Film	Won	
