= Ryuichi Sakamoto: Opus =

2023 documentary film

- South Korean theatrical poster
- Directed by: Neo Sora
- Starring: Ryuichi Sakamoto
- Cinematography: Bill Kirstein
- Edited by: Takuya Kawakami
- Music by: Ryuichi Sakamoto
- Release date: 4 September 2023 (Venice)
- Running time: 103 minutes
- Country: Japan
- Box office: $645,949

Ryuichi Sakamoto: Opus, graphically rendered as Ryuichi Sakamoto | Opus, is a 2023 Japanese concert film directed by Neo Sora. It documents Ryuichi Sakamoto's final concert a few months before his death, at a time when he was struggling with cancer.

== Release ==
The film had its world premiere out of competition at the 80th Venice International Film Festival. It was later screened in other festivals, including the New York Film Festival, the BFI London Film Festival, and the Tokyo International Film Festival.

== Reception ==
On the review aggregator website Rotten Tomatoes, 100% of 33 critics' reviews are positive, with an average rating of 8.6/10. The website's consensus reads: "The beautifully filmed Ryuichi Sakamoto: Opus is a powerful testament to the brilliant composer's legacy as well as a poignant valediction."

== See also ==
- List of films with a 100% rating on Rotten Tomatoes
