= Atsushi Sakahara =

Atsushi Sakahara (阪原 淳, Sakahara Atsushi; born 27 August 1966 in Kyoto) is a film director, writer, and producer. He now teaches at Kyoto Seika University and graduate program at Osaka City University. He is a former advertising executive at Dentsu inc who survived the 1995 sarin gas attacks in Tokyo, which led to his later film work. He produced the 2001 Short Film Palme d'Or winning Bean Cake, directed by David Greenspan. He directed a short film, Don't Call Me Father. in 2012. One of producers for the film was Paul Milgrom, who won Nobel Prize in Economics in 2020. In 2015 he began to work on what would become Me and the Cult Leader, a film following his pursuit of truth and justice by talking and travelling with current Aleph executive Araki Hiroshi. He is currently pursuing a Ph.D. in engineering at Utsunomiya University's school of regional development and creativity. He is also known as an inventor of the SA method, which is a unique idea-generation technique and application. He is a member of The Japan P.E.N Club. Olivia Rosenthal, a French novelist interviewed him in 2018 and released a novel based on it in 2022. He co-founded LOGIGLISH Inc., a language education company, with Kaho Fujikawa, his student at Osaka Metropolitan University. He founded Chemical Weapon Victims Association in 2022 for his experience that he was anti-democratically not allowed to join Tokyo Subway Sarin Gas Attack Victims Association represented by a widow without any particular reasons and list Japan National Police Agency in 2023.
