= Blood Curse (miniseries) =

2023 Indonesian horror streaming limited series

- Promotional poster
- Indonesian: Teluh Darah
- Genre: Horror; Thriller
- Created by: Kimo Stamboel
- Written by: Kimo Stamboel; Agasyah Karim; Khalid Kashogi; Bayu Kurnia
- Directed by: Kimo Stamboel
- Starring: Mikha Tambayong; Deva Mahenra; Lukman Sardi; Imelda Therinne; Justin Adiwinata
- Composer: Fajar Yuskemal
- Country of origin: Indonesia
- Original languages: Indonesian; Javanese
- No. of seasons: 1
- No. of episodes: 10

Production
- Executive producer: Gope T. Samtani
- Producer: Sunil Samtani
- Cinematography: Abdul Gerry Habir
- Editors: Arifin Cu'unk; Fachrun Daud
- Running time: 41–49 minutes
- Production company: Rapi Films

Original release
- Network: Disney+ Hotstar
- Release: 25 February – 29 April 2023

Blood Curse (Indonesian: Teluh Darah) is a 2023 Indonesian horror miniseries that premiered on Disney+ Hotstar on 25 February 2023. The series was created, directed and co-written by Kimo Stamboel and stars Mikha Tambayong and Deva Mahenra.

The series had its world premiere at the 27th Busan International Film Festival during the On Screen section.

== Premise ==
Wulan (Mikha Tambayong), a rational woman dismissive of the occult, faces a horrifying reality when her family is attacked by black magic. Driven to protect them, she delves into her family's past alongside Esa (Deva Mahenra), another victim of supernatural forces, as their intertwined destinies lead them to confront the shocking secrets fueling the escalating terror.

== Cast ==
=== Main ===
- Mikha Tambayong as Wulan Kusumawijaya
- Deva Mahenra as Esa Prasetyo
- Justin Adiwinata as Wisnu Kusumawijaya
- Hingka Moedra as Harun / Manto
- Lukman Sardi as Ahmad Kusumawijaya
- Willem Bevers as Bondan Prasetyo

=== Recurring ===
- Imelda Therinne as Astuti
- Elly D. Luthan as Mbah Tien
- Bizael Tanasale as Reno
- Ence Bagus as Asep
- Mike Lucock as Otto
- Dayu Wijanto as Liliana
- Otig Pakis as Harna
- Ruth Marini as Rima
- Shenina Cinnamon as Atika Ayu Winarsih
- Kiki Narendra as Muhammad Ridho

== Episodes ==
No.	Title	Directed by	Written by	Original release date
1	"The Parcel"	Kimo Stamboel	Kimo Stamboel & Agasyah Karim & Khalid Kashogi & Bayu Kurnia	25 February 2023
2	"Bloody Anniversary"	Kimo Stamboel	Kimo Stamboel & Agasyah Karim & Khalid Kashogi & Bayu Kurnia	4 March 2023
3	"Retribution"	Kimo Stamboel	Kimo Stamboel & Agasyah Karim & Khalid Kashogi & Bayu Kurnia	11 March 2023
4	"Signs"	Kimo Stamboel	Kimo Stamboel & Agasyah Karim & Khalid Kashogi & Bayu Kurnia	18 March 2023
5	"The Uninvited Guests"	Kimo Stamboel	Kimo Stamboel & Agasyah Karim & Khalid Kashogi & Bayu Kurnia	25 March 2023
6	"The Flower Withers"	Kimo Stamboel	Kimo Stamboel & Agasyah Karim & Khalid Kashogi & Bayu Kurnia	1 April 2023
7	"Double Identity"	Kimo Stamboel	Kimo Stamboel & Agasyah Karim & Khalid Kashogi & Bayu Kurnia	8 April 2023
8	"Reckoning"	Kimo Stamboel	Kimo Stamboel & Agasyah Karim & Khalid Kashogi & Bayu Kurnia	15 April 2023
9	"The Source"	Kimo Stamboel	Kimo Stamboel & Agasyah Karim & Khalid Kashogi & Bayu Kurnia	22 April 2023
10	"Blood Debt"	Kimo Stamboel	Kimo Stamboel & Agasyah Karim & Khalid Kashogi & Bayu Kurnia	29 April 2023

== Production ==
In December 2022, Blood Curse was announced as one of the projects presented during Disney's APAC Content Showcase.

== Release ==
Blood Curse had its world premiere during the On Screen section at the 27th Busan International Film Festival. It was announced that it would premiere on Disney+ Hotstar on 25 February 2023 with new episodes released weekly.

In the United States, the series was distributed through Hulu, releasing it on 7 June 2023.

== Accolades ==
Blood Curse won Series of the Year at the 2023 Jakarta Film Week.
