= Bachtiar Siagian =

Indonesian film director and scriptwriter (b. 1923, d. 2002)

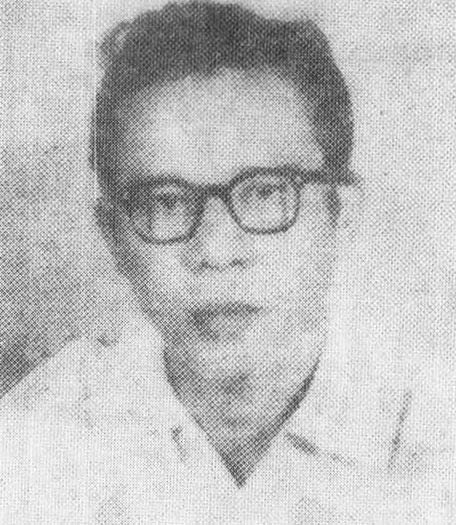
- Siagian, from Peran Pemuda dalam Kebangkitan Film Indonesia (2009), p147
- Born: 19 February 1923; Binjai, North Sumarta, Indonesia
- Died: March 19, 2002 (aged 79); Jakarta, Indonesia
- Known for: Film directing and screenwriting

Bachtiar Siagian (19 February 1923 – 19 March 2002) was an Indonesian film director and scriptwriter, who was "arguably the country's most significant leftist film director and theorist". He was a leading figure of Lembaga Kebudajaan Rakjat (LEKRA). His film Turang (1957) won the main prize at the Indonesian Film Festival in Jakarta in 1960. In 2016 he posthumously received the 'Creator, Pioneer and Innovator Cultural Award' from the Indonesian Ministry of Education and Culture.

== Biography ==
Siagian was born 19 February 1923 in Binjai, North Sumatra, Indonesia, the son of a railway worker.

In 1950, Siagian joined LEKRA and became an influential member of the Indonesian Communist Party's cultural organisation. His experiences of cinema during the Japanese war convinced him of the political power of film, leading to a deep engagement with Russian cinema. Between 1955 and 1965, he wrote and directed 13 feature films, making him one of the most prolific indigenous Indonesian filmmakers prior to the dictator Suharto's anti-communist genocide of 1965. In 1964 Siagian as head the Jakarta Afro-Asian Film Festival executive committee, proclaimed the festival as "not a commercial project, but a tool of the Afro-Asian people for the realisation of their common objectives:" to fight "against cultural penetration of imperialist and colonial forces."

He was shooting a documentary in Tokyo when Suharto claimed power. On returning to Indonesia, he read that authorities were offering cash for his arrest and went into hiding. He was eventually arrested in 1966 and imprisoned without trial for 12 years and not released until December 1977. As a former political prisoner, he was banned from participating in the media but nevertheless wrote various scripts anonymously during this time.

His films, that he often wrote himself, focused on the weak and powerless, providing rare critical insights into society. His often led to clash with authorities and censors as he sought to expose inequalities in society.

His film debut in 1955, Kabut Desember (December Mist), "remained until the 1980s the only Indonesian film that treated prostitutes as anything but abject." Daerah Hilang/The Lost Area (1956) that follows 24 hours in life of a released prisoner was heavily censored by the Indonesian government for its socially critical scenes. And in 1961, the PKI leadership tried to stop the circulation of Baja Membara (Burning Steel) because of what they saw as its pro-Islam stance. Despite the renown and acclaim of many of his films the majority of them, and others of other Leftist filmmakers have been lost or destroyed during the New Order regime.

Violetta, made in 1962, was believed to be the only film of his that survived. The film was restored by the Sinematek in 2013 and screened for the first time post-1965 at the Kinoforum in Jakarta as part of the ARKIPEL - Jakarta International Documentary & Experimental Film Festival in 2015.

The majority of his films, and others of other Leftist filmmakers have been lost or destroyed.

Siagian died in Jakarta on 19 March 2002.

== Filmography ==
Year	Title	Credited as		
Year	Title	Director	Screenplay/story writer	Cast
1955	Tjorak Dunia / December Mists	Yes	Yes	
1955	Kabut Desember	Yes	Yes	
1956	Daerah Hilang / The Lost Area	Yes	Yes	
1956	Melati Sendja	Yes	Yes	Yes
1957	Turang / Beloved	Yes	Yes	
1959	Sekedjap Mata	Yes	Yes	
1959	Iseng		Yes	
1960	Piso Surit	Yes	Yes	
1960	Darah Tinggi (Dir. Lilik Sudjio)		Yes	
1961	Notaris Sulami	Yes	Yes	
1961	Memburu Menantu		Yes	
1961	Kamar 13 / Room 13 (Dir. Basuki Effendi)		Yes	
1961	Badja Membara / Burning Steel	Yes	Yes	
1962	Violetta	Yes	Yes	
1963	Kami Bangun Hari Esok	Yes	Yes	
1964	Njanjian di Lereng Dieng	Yes	Yes	
1965	Karmapala (unfinished)		Yes	
1981	Intan Mendulang Cinta (dir. Djamal Harputra)		Yes	
