= Money Has Four Legs =

Burmese film

- Burmese: ခြေလေးချောင်း
- Directed by: Maung Sun
- Written by: Ma Aeint; Maung Sun
- Starring: Khin Khin Hsu; Okkar Dat Khe; Ko Thu
- Release dates: October 2020 (Busan); August 12, 2021
- Running time: 98 minutes
- Country: Myanmar
- Language: Burmese

Money Has Four Legs (Burmese: ခြေလေးချောင်း), is a 2020 Burmese comedy drama film. The film follows the journey of a young director who attempts to complete a feature film in Myanmar, and satirically depicts systemic issues in the country, including corruption and government censorship, and the state of the Burmese film industry.

In the wake of the 2021 Myanmar coup d'état, the film's producer and co-writer, Ma Aeint, was detained by the military junta in June 2021, after becoming a target of the junta for her involvement in this film. She was sentenced to 3 years of hard labour in April 2022.

== Cast ==
- Khin Khin Hsu
- Okkar Dat Khe
- Ko Thu

== Critical reception ==
The film was well received by audiences, and was shown at international film festivals, including the 25th Busan International Film Festival, 74th Locarno Film Festival, the 20th New York Asian Film Festival, and the 2021 Vancouver International Film Festival. It was awarded the Special Mention award of Global Feature Award at the 2021 Jakarta Film Week.
