= Ananth Subramaniam =

Malaysian filmmaker

- ஆனந்த் சுப்பிரமணியம்
- Born: Malaysia
- Occupation: Filmmaker
- Years active: 2018–present
- Notable work: Bleat!, Holy Crowd, Liar Land, The House of Brick and Stone

Ananth Subramaniam (Tamil: ஆனந்த் சுப்பிரமணியம்) is a Malaysian filmmaker and screenwriter. He is best known for directing the short film Bleat! (2025), which became the first Malaysian short film selected for the Critics’ Week (La Semaine de la Critique) section at the Cannes Film Festival.

== Early life and education ==
Ananth Subramaniam was born in Malaysia and is of Tamil descent. He holds an MA in filmmaking from Kingston University London. The first short film he made in Malaysia, Colourless won the BMW Shorties Grand Prize Award 2018 along with Best Director, Best Actress, Best Cinematography, Best Editing and Best Sound Design.

== Career ==
In 2019 Ananth's short film Liar Land was screened at the Locarno Film Festival. His 2022 short film The House of Brick and Stone was screened at the Fantasia International Film Festival in Montreal and the Bucheon International Fantastic Film Festival in South Korea.

Ananth directed the short film Bleat! in 2025. The film was selected for the Critics’ Week section at the Cannes Film Festival. The film was filmed entirely in Banting, Selangor, Subramaniam's hometown. The film was produced through a multinational collaboration involving Sixtymac Pictures (Malaysia), Epicmedia Productions (Philippines), and DW (France). After Cannes Film Festival, Bleat! got selected into Clermont-Ferrand International Short Film Festival and won the Student Prize (Prix Étudiant) in 2026.

In 2026, he returned to the Cannes Film Festival with his short film Holy Crowd, which premiered at the 65th Semaine De La Critique programme alongside the 79th Cannes Film Festival. The 16-minute Indonesian-French co-production was co-directed with Indonesian filmmaker Reza Fahriyansyah and developed under the Next Step Studio initiative, a regional collaboration programme for emerging Southeast Asian filmmakers. The film follows a woman who mysteriously rises from the dead during her own funeral and becomes the centre of a growing religious following.

At the same year, Ananth joined La Résidence du Festival de Cannes in Paris to develop his debut feature film, Pray to the Thunder.

== Filmography ==
=== Short films ===
Year	Title	Role
2019	Liar Land	Director, Writer
2022	The House of Brick and Stone	Director, Writer
2025	Bleat! (Kattu!)	Director, Writer
2026	Holy Crowd	Director, Writer

== Festival screenings and awards ==
Films	Year	Festival	Award / Section	Category	Result
Bleat! (Kattu!)	2025	Cannes Film Festival	Queer Palm	Short Film	Won
Bleat! (Kattu!)	2025	Cannes Film Festival	Semaine De La Critique	Short Film	Nominee
Bleat! (Kattu!)	2025	Melbourne International Film Festival	Official Selection	International Short Film Competition	Nominee
Bleat! (Kattu!)	2025	Vancouver International Film Festival	Official Selection	International Short Film Competition	Nominee
Bleat! (Kattu!)	2025	Dharamshala International Film Festival	Official Selection	International Short Film Competition	Nominee
Bleat! (Kattu!)	2025	Singapore International Film Festival	Best Director	Southeast Asia Short Film Competition	Won
Bleat! (Kattu!)	2026	Clermont-Ferrand International Short Film Festival	Youth Jury Award	International Competition	Won
Bleat! (Kattu!)	2026	Hong Kong International Film Festival	Official Selection	International Short Film Competition	Nominee
Bleat! (Kattu!)	2026	New Directors/New Films Festival	Official Selection	International Short Film	Nominee
Bleat! (Kattu!)	2026	SXSW London	Official Selection	International Short Film Competition	Nominee
Bleat! (Kattu!)	2026	Flickerfest International Short Film Festival	Best Rainbow Short	Azure Productions Award	Won
Bleat! (Kattu!)	2026	Bucheon International Fantastic Film Festival	BIFAN’s international short film competition	Bucheon Choice World	Nominee
Bleat! (Kattu!)	2026	Jakarta Film Week	Global Short Award	Global Short Official Selection	Won
Holy Crowd	2026	Cannes Film Festival	World Premiere	Next Step Studio Semaine de la Critique	Selected
Liar Land	2019	Locarno Film Festival	Open Door Special Mention Award	Locarno Shorts Weeks	Won
