= A Very Straight Neck =

2025 short film by Neo Sora

- Teaser poster
- Directed by: Neo Sora
- Written by: Neo Sora
- Based on: I Will Go Ahead by Momoe Narazaki
- Produced by: Lawrence Xiao
- Starring: Sakura Ando
- Cinematography: Kaori Oda
- Edited by: Manaka Nagai
- Production companies: Nowness China; Zakkubalan
- Release date: August 13, 2025 (Locarno)
- Running time: 11 minutes
- Countries: Japan; China
- Language: Japanese

A Very Straight Neck is a 2025 short film directed and written by Neo Sora, based on the 2019 graphic short story I Will Go Ahead by Momoe Narazaki. The film stars Sakura Ando as a woman who wakes up one day with a severe neck pain.

It had its world premiere at the 78th Locarno Film Festival on 13 August 2025, competing at the Concorso Corti d'Autore section, where it won the Pardino d'Oro Swiss Life for the Best Auteur Short Film.

== Premise ==
A woman wakes up with a severe neck pain and revisits memories about her childhood. The film explores the body as a physical manifestation of emotional trauma. It was based on Momoe Nagasaki’s short story I will go ahead.

== Production ==
The film was commissioned by NOWNESS China.

In February 2025, it was reported that Parallax had acquired the film's international sales.

== Release ==
A Very Straight Neck had its premiere at the 78th Locarno Film Festival on 13 August 2025 at the Concorso Corti d'Autore section.

The film had its Japanese premiere at the Osaka Asian Film Festival in late August 2025.

== Accolades ==
Award	Date of ceremony	Category	Recipient	Result	Ref.
Locarno Film Festival	16 August 2025	Pardino d'Oro Swiss Life for the Best Auteur Short Film	Neo Sora	Won	
Jakarta Film Week	26 October 2025	Global Short Award	Neo Sora	Won	
