= Jean-Sébastien Hamel =

Canadian editor

Jean-Sébastien Hamel is a Canadian animator and film editor, who works with his partner Alexandra Myotte in the animation studio Sémaphore Films. They are most noted as co-directors of A Crab in the Pool (Un trou dans la poitrine), which won the Prix Iris for Best Animated Short Film at the 26th Quebec Cinema Awards in 2024, and was named to the initial shortlist for the Academy Award for Best Animated Short Film in the leadup to the 97th Academy Awards in 2025.

He began his career as an editor, first meeting Myotte when he was brought in to collaborate as an editor on the music video for Karkwa's single "La Façade". Their first animated short film as a duo, La fille aux yeux rouges, was released in 2009; they have since continued to collaborate both on films credited to the duo as co-directors, and on films credited to one of them as a solo director but still featuring supporting technical work by the other, including Myotte's No Title (Pas de titre) and Hamel's The Cloven Sky.

The duo's newest film, What We Leave Behind (Ce qu'on laisse derrière), is slated to premiere at the 78th Locarno Film Festival.
