= Memories of a Burning Body =

2024 Spanish drama film

- Theatrical release poster
- Spanish: Memorias de un cuerpo que arde
- Directed by: Antonella Sudasassi Furniss
- Written by: Antonella Sudasassi Furniss
- Produced by: Antonella Sudasassi Furniss; Estephania Bonnett Alonso
- Starring: Sol Carballo; Paulina Bernini; Juliana Filloy
- Cinematography: Andrés Campos Sánchez
- Edited by: Bernat Aragonés
- Music by: Juano Damiani
- Production companies: Substance Films; Playlab Films
- Distributed by: Bendita Film Sales
- Release dates: 19 February 2024 (Berlinale); 29 August 2024 (Costa Rica)
- Running time: 90 minutes
- Countries: Costa Rica; Spain
- Language: Spanish

Memories of a Burning Body (Spanish: Memorias de un cuerpo que arde) is a 2024 drama film written and directed by Antonella Sudasassi Furniss. The film starring Sol Carballo, Paulina Bernini and Juliana Filloy, portrays the story of Ana, Patricia and Mayela, who, educated in a repressive era where sexuality was taboo, found the meaning of femininity through unspoken rules and implicit impositions.

A co-production of Costa Rica and Spain, the film was selected in the Panorama section at the 74th Berlin International Film Festival where it had its world premiere on 19 February 2024, and won Panorama Audience Award for Best Feature Film. It was selected as the Costa Rican entry for the Best International Feature Film at the 97th Academy Awards, but was not nominated.

== Synopsis ==
Two sexagenarian women, Ana and Patricia, and one septuagenarian woman, Mayela, grew up in a time when sexuality was not discussed or expressed freely as it was considered taboo. They learned to be women from the silent norms and hidden demands of their society. Now they have the courage to share their experiences openly. Their stories are told in a poetic manner: as they narrate their lives off-screen, another woman their age embodies their memories, secrets and desires.

== Cast ==
- Sol Carballo as Woman
- Paulina Bernini as Young Woman
- Juliana Filloy as Girl
- Liliana Biamonte as Mother
- Juan Luis Araya as Husband
- Gabriel Araya as Father
- Leonardo Perucci as Boyfriend
- Cecilia García as Grandmother

== Production ==
The project was selected in the development pitch at the Costa Rica International Film Festival, preselected at the Hubert Bals Fund, Script and Project Development Bright Future and at the San Sebastián Co-production Forum. The co-production of Sub stance Films and Playlab Films is directed by Antonella Sudasassi and co-produced with Estephania Bonnett Alonso.

Filming began in Costa Rica from November 2022. It ended on 18 December 2022, and post-production took place in Spain.

== Release ==
Memories of a Burning Body had its world premiere on 19 February 2024, as part of the 74th Berlin International Film Festival, in Panorama. On 31 October 2024, it was showcased at the 37th Tokyo International Film Festival in 'Women’s Empowerment' section.

It also competed in New Directors Competition at the São Paulo International Film Festival and had screening on 21 October 2025.

In January 2024, Tenerife's Bendita Film acquired the international sales rights of the film. It was commercially released on August 29, 2024, in Costa Rican theaters.

== Reception ==
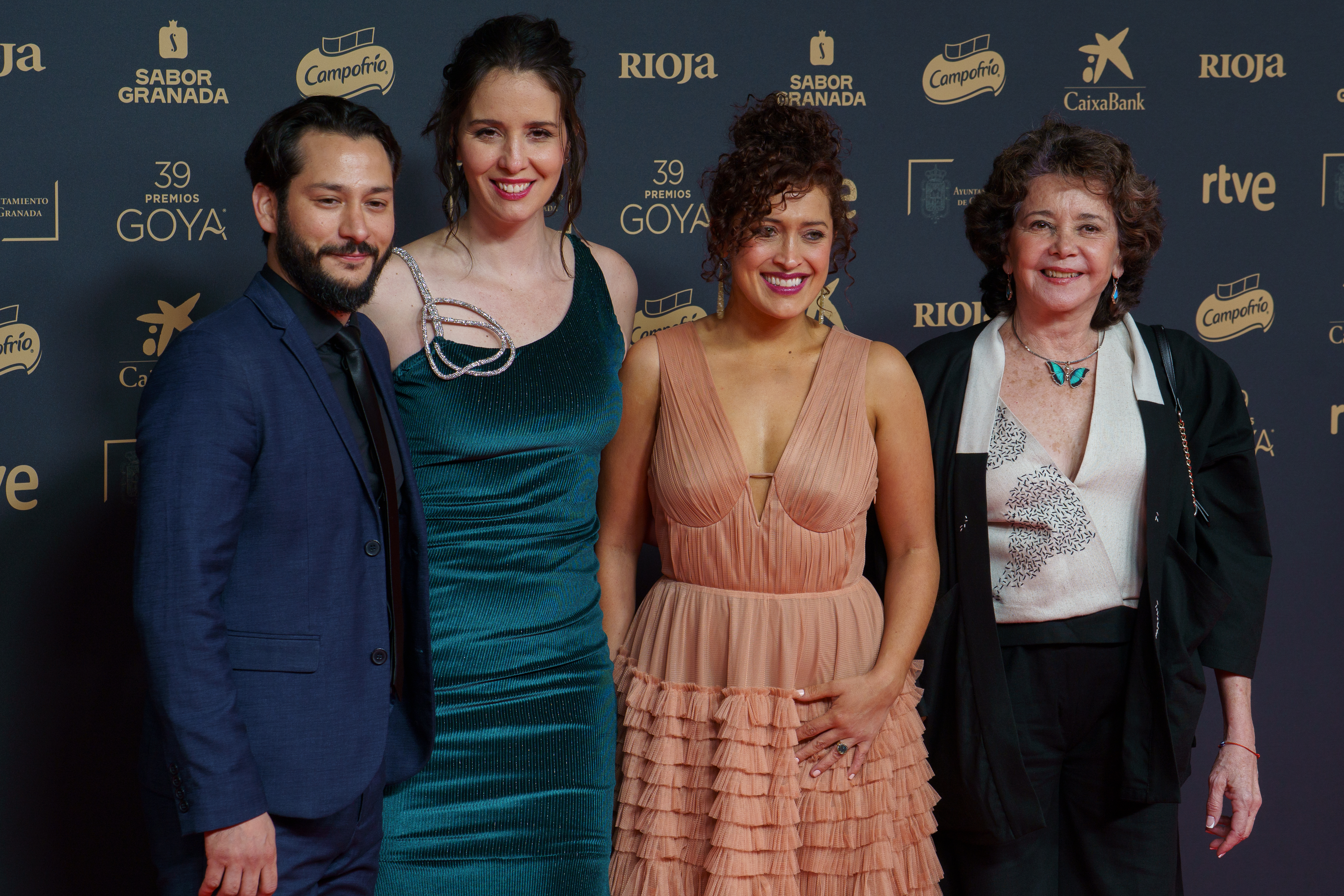
Crew of Memories of a Burning Body attending the 39th Goya Awards.

Giorgia Del Don reviewing the film at Berlinale for Cineuropa wrote, "Antonella Sudasassi Furniss’ second feature film is an emancipatory cry uniting different generations of women who have been held back by limits set by the patriarchy."

=== Accolades ===
Award	Date	Category	Recipient	Result	Ref.
Berlin International Film Festival	25 February 2024	Panorama Audience Award for Best Feature Film	Antonella Sudasassi Furniss	Won	
Lima Film Festival	17 August 2024	Best Picture	Memories of a Burning Body	Nominated	
Busan International Film Festival	11 October 2024	Flash Forward Audience Award	Memories of a Burning Body	Won	
Forqué Awards	14 December 2024	Best Latin-American Film	Memories of a Burning Body	Nominated	
Goya Awards	8 February 2025	Best Ibero-American Film	Memories of a Burning Body	Nominated	

== See also ==
- List of submissions to the 97th Academy Awards for Best International Feature Film
- List of Costa Rican submissions for the Academy Award for Best International Feature Film
