= What We Leave Behind (2025 film) =

2025 Canadian short animated film

- Promotional poster
- French: Ce qu'on laisse derrière
- Directed by: Jean-Sébastien Hamel; Alexandra Myotte
- Screenplay by: Alexandra Myotte; Jean-Sébastien Hamel
- Produced by: Alexandra Myotte; Jean-Sébastien Hamel
- Starring: Jean-Sébastien Hamel
- Edited by: Jean-Sébastien Hamel
- Music by: Brandon Hopkins; François Lacasse
- Animation by: Alexandra Myotte
- Production company: Sémaphore Films
- Distributed by: Travelling distribution
- Release date: 15 August 2025 (Locarno)
- Running time: 11 minutes
- Country: Canada
- Language: French

What We Leave Behind (French: Ce qu'on laisse derrière) is a 2025 Canadian French-language short animated film written directed and produced by Alexandra Myotte and Jean-Sébastien Hamel. It depicts Dan and a gaping hole in his neck that won't heal.

The film had its world premiere in the Leopard of Tomorrow - Concorso Internazionale section of the 78th Locarno Film Festival on 15 August 2025, where it was nominated for the Pardino d'Oro.

== Synopsis ==
Dan has an unhealed, gaping wound in his neck — its cause a mystery even to him. He’s unable to recall how it happened, and something keeps him from speaking of it. To find healing, he must return to the dark arena of his childhood and recover the lost piece of himself that still holds him back from becoming whole.

== Voices ==
- Jean-Sébastien Hamel as Dan, The Aggressor, Coach
- Jack Hackel as Night Watchman

== Release ==
What We Leave Behind had its world premiere at the Concorso Internazionale portion of the Pardi di Domani competition of the 78th Locarno Film Festival on 15 August 2025, and competed for the Pardino d'Oro Arts3 Foundation for the Best International Short Film.

The film was screened in Short Cuts section (Program 3) of the 2025 Toronto International Film Festival on 7 September 2025.

== Accolades ==
Award	Date of ceremony	Category	Recipient	Result	Ref.
Locarno Film Festival	16 August 2025	Pardino d'Oro Arts3 Foundation for the Best International Short Film	What We Leave Behind	Nominated	
Spark Animation Film Festival	2025	Director’s Prize	Alexandra Myotte, Jean-Sébastien Hamel	Won	
Toronto International Film Festival	2025	Best Short Film	What We Leave Behind	Nominated	
Clermont Ferrand Short Film Festival	2025	Best Animated Short Film	What We Leave Behind	Nominated	
Prix collégial du cinéma québécois	2026	Best Short Film	What We Leave Behind	Nominated	
Kaboom Animation Festival	2026	Best Short	What We Leave Behind	Won	
Annecy International Animation Film Festival	2026	Cristal for Best Short	What We Leave Behind	Nominated	
SXSW	2026	Best Short Film	What We Leave Behind	Nominated	
