= Alexandra Myotte =

Canadian animator

Alexandre Myotte is a Canadian animator, who works with her partner Jean-Sébastien Hamel in the animation studio Sémaphore Films. They are most noted as co-directors of A Crab in the Pool (Un trou dans la poitrine), which won the Prix Iris for Best Animated Short Film at the 26th Quebec Cinema Awards in 2024, and was named to the initial shortlist for the Academy Award for Best Animated Short Film in the leadup to the 97th Academy Awards in 2025.

Myotte was previously director of No Title (Pas de titre), which was a Prix Iris nominee in the same category at the 24th Quebec Cinema Awards in 2022. That film also featured Hamel's participation in technical roles despite him not being officially credited as a co-director.

She began her career making animated music videos for the indie rock band Karkwa, where she first met Hamel when he was brought in to collaborate as an editor on the video for "La Façade". Their first animated short film as a duo, La fille aux yeux rouges, was released in 2009; they have since continued to collaborate both on films credited to the duo as co-directors, and on films credited to one of them as a solo director but still featuring supporting technical work by the other.

The duo's newest film, What We Leave Behind (Ce qu'on laisse derrière), is slated to premiere at the 78th Locarno Film Festival.
