= Neo Sora =

American director (born 1991)

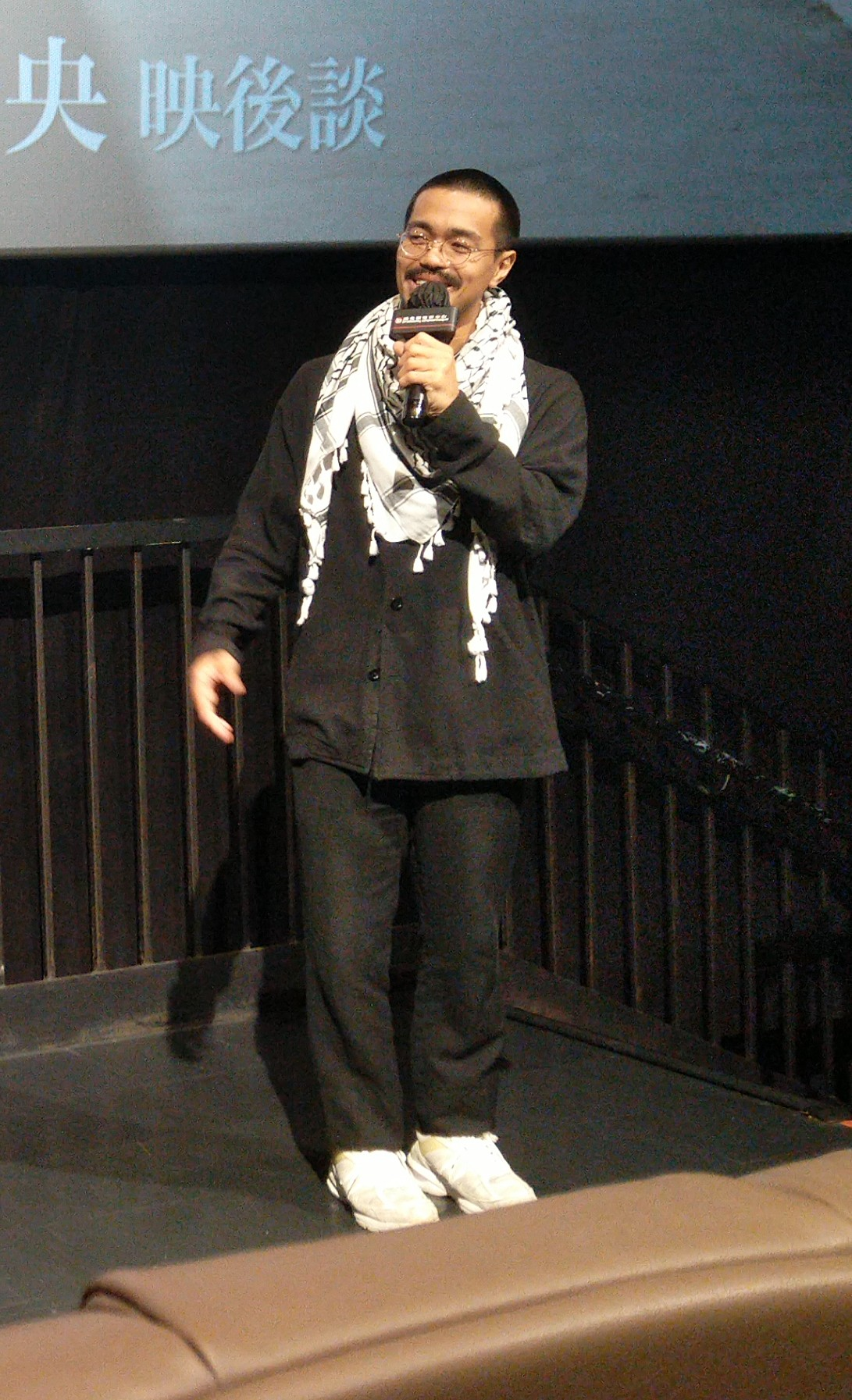
- Born: 1991; New York, New York
- Occupations: Director, screenwriter
- Years active: 2010–present
- Relatives: Ryuichi Sakamoto (father)

Neo Sora (Japanese: 空 音央, Hepburn: Sora Neo; born 1991) is an U.S.-born Japanese film director and screenwriter. He has directed the documentary feature film Ryuichi Sakamoto: Opus (2023) and the narrative feature film Happyend (2024).

== Early life ==
Sora was born to film composer Ryuichi Sakamoto and Norika Sora, Sakamoto's long-time manager, in New York, New York, and was raised in both New York and Tokyo. Sora graduated from Friends Seminary in New York followed by Wesleyan University in Philosophy and Film Studies.

== Career ==
Sora is a member of the filmmaking collective Zakkubalan alongside Albert Tholen and Aiko Masubuchi. Sora has directed music videos for Shuta Hasunuma & U-zhaan, BIGYUKI, Rachika S and Biki Zoom, Anthony Naples, Beta Librae, Jason Moran and Dairo Suga.

In 2020, Sora directed the narrative short film The Chicken which had its world premiere at the 73rd Locarno Film Festival. It also screened at the 2020 New York Film Festival and the AFI Fest.

In 2022, Sora directed the narrative short film Sugar Glass Bottle, which premiered at the Hamptons International Film Festival.

In 2023, Sora directed the documentary Ryuichi Sakamoto: Opus revolving around the last concert performed by his father, Ryuichi Sakamoto, which had its world premiere at the 80th Venice Film Festival. The film was released in March 2024 by Janus Films.

In 2024, Sora wrote and directed Happyend which had its world premiere at the 81st Venice International Film Festival in the Orizzonti section. It also made its North American premiere at the 2024 Toronto International Film Festival and screened in the Main Slate of the 62nd New York Film Festival. It was previously selected for the 2022 Sundance Institute Screenwriting and Directing labs. In 2025, he was given the 2024 Directors Guild of Japan New Directors Award for Happyend.

In 2025, Sora wrote and directed the short film A Very Straight Neck starring Sakura Ando, having its world premiere at the 78th Locarno Film Festival.

== Filmography ==
Short film

Year	Title	Director	Writer
2020	The Chicken	Yes	Yes
2022	Sugar Glass Bottle	Yes	Yes
2025	A Very Straight Neck	Yes	Yes

Documentary film

- Ryuichi Sakamoto: Opus (2023)

Feature film

Year	Title	Director	Writer
2024	Happyend	Yes	Yes
