= CGV Cinemas Indonesia =

Indonesian movie theater chain

PT Graha Layar Prima Tbk
- Trade name: CGV Cinemas Indonesia
- Formerly: BlitzMegaplex (trade name 2006–2015); CGV Blitz (trade name 2015–2017)
- Type: Public (Perseroan terbatas)
- Traded as: IDX: BLTZ
- Industry: Film industry
- Founded: 3 February 2004; 22 years ago
- Founder: Ananda Siregar; David Hilman
- Headquarters: Jakarta, Indonesia
- Number of locations: 71
- Area served: Nationwide (Indonesia)
- Key people: Bratanata Perdana (president commissioner); Nah Jeonghun (president director)
- Services: Multiplex
- Owners: CGI Holdings Ltd. (51%); Coree Capital Ltd. (40%)
- Parent: CJ CGV
- Website: cgv.id

PT Graha Layar Prima Tbk (d/b/a CGV Cinemas Indonesia; formerly BlitzMegaplex from 2006 to 2015 and CGV Blitz from 2015 to 2017) is a cinema chain in Indonesia. The chain was founded as BlitzMegaplex in October 2006. In 2023, it operated over 71 cinemas, with 408 screens across 34 cities in Indonesia.

== History ==
=== 2006-2012: As BlitzMegaplex ===
BlitzMegaplex opened its first location in the Paris Van Java shopping mall, Bandung, Indonesia, on 16 October 2006. Seven more locations have been built, including one in Bekasi Cyber Park, which was opened on 3 June 2011. In September 2012, BlitzMegaplex opened its first location outside Java, in the Plaza Balikpapan shopping center in Balikpapan. This location was also the first location to use the Blitz Theater brand, later adopted by other locations such as those in Kepri Mall, Harbour Bay, Bandara City Mall, and Grand Galaxy Park.

=== 2023-2017: CJ CGV ownership and rebrand ===
In 2013, there was a rumor that the Korean cinema chain CJ CGV bought BlitzMegaplex shares, something which was denied later on since it was illegal to do so under Indonesian law; this is because CJ CGV was still on Indonesia's Daftar Negatif Investasi (DNI) list, or negative investment list. The evidence pointed to Koreans connected to CJ CGV being on the company's board before its IPO in 2013.

The company went public on the Indonesia Stock Exchange on 10 April 2014. However, CJ CGV already owned several shares of the company a month before the IPO. In August 2015, the company then rebranded all of its locations into CGV Cinemas. Its first location with the brand CGV Blitz was Miko Mall, Bandung.

As of November 2015, CJ CGV owned about 14% of Blitz.

In late 2016, CJ CGV increased its share of the company to 51%, thus becoming the majority shareholder of the company. The company underwent another rebrand to its current name, CGV Cinemas, in 2017.

=== 2018-present: Closed sites ===
In 2018, Blitz Theater Grand Galaxy Park was replaced by Flix Cinema, another cinema chain by Agung Sedayu Group. In February 2020, its location in Mall of Indonesia was also replaced by Flix Cinema as well. Due to the COVID-19 pandemic, its location in Kepri Mall remained closed in March 2020. Two other locations—Harbour Bay and Daya Grand Square—were closed by 2021 because the malls they occupied ceased to exist. In 2023, it operated over 71 cinemas, with 408 screens across 34 cities in Indonesia.

In 2024, two additional locations, Bandara City Mall and Grand Kawanua Manado, closed due to low occupancy. The theatre site in Bandara City Mall was acquired by Cinema XXI in February 2025, while the theatre site in Kepri Mall, which rebranded to K Square Batam, was acquired by Cinépolis in December 2025. In August 2026, another location, Studio Pekanbaru, closed because the mall it occupied ceased to exist.

== Locations ==
The CGV Cinemas theater locations in 2018:

CGV Cinemas	Address	Total screens
Paris Van Java	Jl. Sukajadi 137–139, Bandung	11
Grand Indonesia	Jl. MH. Thamrin No. 1, Tanah Abang, Central Jakarta	11
Pacific Place	SCBD, Jl. Jend Sudirman kav 52–53, Senayan, Kebayoran Baru, South Jakarta	8
Teraskota	BSD City, South Tangerang	7
Central Park	Podomoro City, Jl.Let.Jen.S.Parman Kav 28, Grogol Petamburan, West Jakarta	11
Bekasi Cyber Park	Jl. KH Noor Alie No. 17, Bekasi	9
Plaza Balikpapan	Jl. Jendral Sudirman No. 1, Klandasan Ilir, Balikpapan	6
Miko Mall	Jl. KH. Wahid Hasyim No. 599, Kopo, Bandung	7
Bandung Electronic Center	Jl. Purnawarman No. 7-11, Bandung	7
Sahid J-Walk Mall	Jl. Babarsari No.2 Catur Tunggal, Depok, Sleman	7
Grage City Mall	Jl. Ahmad Yani, Penggambiran, Cirebon, West Java	7
Pakuwon Mall Jogja	Jl. Ring Road Utara, Condong Catur, Depok, Sleman, Yogyakarta	7
Marvell City	Jl. Raya Ngagel No.123, Wonokromo, Surabaya, East Java	7
Festive Walk	Jl. Galuh Mas Raya, Komplek Perum. Galuh Mas, Karawang, West Java	7
Slipi Jaya	Jl. Let. Jen. S. Parman Kav. 17 - 18, Palmerah, West Jakarta	5
Ecoplaza Citra Raya Cikupa	Citra Raya Boulevard, Cikupa, Tangerang Regency	7
Sunrise Mall	Jl. Benteng Pancasila No. 9, Mojokerto, East Java	7
Focal Point	Jalan Ring Road Gagak Hitam, Medan, North Sumatra	9
Green Pramuka Square	Jl. Ahmad Yani Kav. 49, Senen, Central Jakarta	5
Rita Supermall	Jl. Jenderal Sudirman No. 296, Sokanegara, East Purwokerto, Purwokerto, Central Java	6
Social Market	Jl. Veteran no. 999, Ilir Timur II, Palembang, South Sumatra	8
Bella Terra Lifestyle Center	Jl. Boulevard Raya Kav.1, Kelapa Gading	6
23 Paskal Shopping Center	Jalan Pasirkaliki 25–27, Pasir Kaliki, Bandung	7
D'Mall Depok	Jl. Margonda Kav. 88, Depok	7
Transmart Maguwo	Jalan Raya Solo Km 8, Sleman Regency	6
Transmart Tegal	Jl. Kolonel Soegiono, Tegal, Central Java	6
Transmart Pekanbaru	Jl. Musyawarah No. 11, Pekanbaru	6
Transmart Mataram	Jalan Selaparang No. 60, Mataram	5
Transmart Cempaka Putih	Jl. Ahmad Yani No. 83 Cempaka Putih, Central Jakarta	5
Bekasi Trade Center	Jalan H. Mulyadi Joyomartono, Bekasi	6
AEON Mall Jakarta Garden City	Jl. Cassia Utama Pasar Modern, Cakung, East Jakarta	9
Metro Indah Mall	Jl. Soekarno-Hatta, Kawasan Niaga MTC, Bandung	6
Transmart Palembang	Jl. Brigjen HM Dhani Effendi, Palembang	5
Transmart Solo	Jalan Raya Ahmad Yani No. 234, Sukoharjo Regency	5
Transmart Cirebon	Jl. Dr. Cipto Mangunkusumo, Cirebon	5
Lagoon Avenue Bekasi	Jalan KH Noer Ali Kalimalang, South Bekasi, Bekasi	6
Transmart Lampung	Jl. Sultan Agung No. 283, Bandar Lampung	5
Transmart Graha Bintaro	Jalan Boulevard Raya, Graha Raya Bintaro, South Tangerang	6
Technomart Karawang	Jl. Arteri Galuh Mas, Puseurjaya, East Telukjambe, Karawang	3
BG Junction	Jl. Bubutan No. 1-7, Surabaya	7
Blitar Square	Jl. Merdeka No. 6-7, Kepanjen Lor, Kepanjen Kidul, Blitar	5
Icon Mall Gresik	Jl. Wahidin Sh. No 788 Kembangan, Kebomas, Gresik	6
Sunter Mall	Jalan Danau Sunter Utara Blok G7, North Jakarta	4
fX Sudirman	Jalan Jenderal Sudirman Pintu Satu Senayan, Central Jakarta	4
Palembang Trade Center	Jl. R. Sukamto no. 8A, 8 Ilir, Palembang, South Sumatra	7
Sadang Terminal Square	Jalan Veteran, Ciwangi, Bungursari, Purwakarta Regency, West Java	5
Wijaya Kusuma	Mangunharjo, Mayangan, Probolinggo	4
Plaza Lawu Madiun	Jalan Pahlawan, Kartoharjo, Madiun, East Java	5
Park Avenue Batam	Park Avenue Batam, UG floor, Jl. Orchard Boulevard, Belian, Batam	6
Roxy Square Jember	Jl. Hayam Wuruk No. 50-58, Gerdu, Sempursari, Kaliwates, Jember, Java Timur	6
Holiday Pekanbaru	Jalan Sultan Syarif Qasim, Kota Tinggi, Limapuluh, Pekanbaru	4
Grand Batam Mall	Jalan Pembangunan, Batam	6
Kings Shopping Center	Jalan Kepatihan 11–17, Balonggede, Regol, Bandung, West Java	4
Panakkukang Square	Jalan Adhiyaksa No. 1, Makassar	5
Grand Batavia	Jalan Graha Batavia No.88, Sindangsari, Pasar Kemis, Tangerang Regency	4
Kediri Mall	Jalan Hayam Wuruk, Dandangan, Kediri, East Java	5
Raya Padang	Jalan Pasar Baru, No. 2, Kp. Jao, Padang, West Sumatra	5
Living Plaza Jababeka	Living Plaza Jababeka, 1st floor, Mekarmukti, Cikarang, Bekasi	6
Plaza Mulia	Jl. Bhayangkara No. 58, Bugis, Samarinda Ulu, Samarinda, Kalimantan Timur	5
Buaran Plaza	Jl. Raden Inten 1, Buaran, Jakarta Timur	4
Cikampek Mall	Jl. Jend. Sudirman No. 76, Dawuan, Cikampek, Karawang	4
Vivo Sentul	Jl. Raya Bogor KM 50, Cimandala, Bogor	7
Maspion Square	Jl. Ahmad Yani No. 73, Margorejo, Wonocolo, Surabaya	5
Mall Ciputra Tangerang	Jl. Citra Raya Boulevard No. 38, Ciakar, Panongan, Tangerang	4
Paradise Walk Serpong	Paradise Walk Serpong, UG floor, Jl. Paradise Serpong City, Babakan, Setu, Tangerang Selatan	6
Malang City Point	Jl. Terusan Dieng No. 32, Pisang Candi, Sukun, Malang	3
Poins Mall	Jl. RA. Kartini No. 1, Lebak Bulus, Jakarta Selatan	4
Ecoplaza Citra Maja Raya	Citra Maja Raya, Jl. Raya Kopo, Maja, Serang, Banten	4
Foodmosphere Karawaci	Foodmosphere Goldland, Jl. Imam Bonjol RT. 03/RW. 04, Panunggangan Barat, Karawaci, Tangerang, Banten	5
Depok Town Center	Depok Town Center, 2nd floor, Jl. Raya Sawangan No.1, Rangkapan Jaya, Pancoran Mas, Depok, Jawa Barat	5
Grand Mall Lampung	Grand Mall Lampung, Jl. Raden Intan No. 88, Pelita, Enggal, Bandar Lampung, Lampung	5

== See also ==
- List of movie theater chains
