= 36th Singapore International Film Festival =

2025 film festival

- Opening film: Girl by Shu Qi
- Location: Singapore
- No. of films: 121
- Festival date: 26 November–7 December 2025
- Website: sgiff.com

Singapore International Film Festival
- 37th 35th

The 36th annual Singapore International Film Festival took place from 26 November to 7 December 2025 in Singapore. A total of 121 films from 45 countries were screened during the festival. The festival opened with Shu Qi's directorial debut Girl.

The Best Asian Feature award was presented to documentary film, Always.

== Juries ==
=== Asian Feature Film Competition ===
- Lucrecia Martel, Argentine filmmaker, Jury President
- Chin Han, Singaporean actor
- Lim Giong, Taiwanese musician
- Nicholas Saputra, Indonesian actor and producer
- Yason Banal, Filipino artist

=== Southeast Asian Short Film Competition ===
- Koyo Yamashita, Japanese curator and filmmaker
- Phan Dang Di, Vietnamese filmmaker
- Tan Pin Pin, Singaporean filmmaker

=== FIPRESCI Award ===
- Amarsanaa Battulga, Mongolian journalist
- Nguyen Le, Vietnamese journalist
- Rita Dutta, Indian journalist

== Official selection ==
=== Opening film ===
English title	Original title	Director(s)	Production countrie(s)
Girl	女孩	Shu Qi	Taiwan

=== Asian Feature Film Competition ===
English title	Original title	Director(s)	Production countrie(s)
A Useful Ghost	ผีใช้ได้ค่ะ	Ratchapoom Boonbunchachoke	Thailand, Singapore, France, Germany
Always	从来	Deming Chen	United States, China, France, Taiwan
Amoeba		Tan Siyou	Singapore, France, Netherlands, Spain, South Korea
Black Rabbit, White Rabbit	Харгӯши сиёҳ, харгӯши сафед	Shahram Mokri	Tajikistan, United Arab Emirates
Cactus Pears	Sabar Bonda	Rohan Parashuram Kanawade	India, United Kingdom, Canada
Human Resource		Nawapol Thamrongrattanarit	Thailand
MAG MAG	禍禍女	Yuriyan Retriever	Japan
Riverstone	රිවස්ටර්න්	Lalith Rathnayake	Sri Lanka
Shape of Momo	Chhora Jastai	Tribeny Rai	India, South Korea
Two Seasons, Two Strangers	旅と日々	Sho Miyake	Japan

=== Southeast Asian Short Film Competition ===
English title	Original title	Director(s)	Production countrie(s)
The 4PLY Clandestine System		Natalie Sin	Singapore
a flower not a flower	เดี๋ยวด๋าวประประ	Tanakit Kitsanayunyong	Thailand
A Metamorphosis	အသွင်ပြောင်းလဲခြင်းတစ်ခု	Lin Htet Aung	Myanmar
ARI-ARI (The Storyteller)	Ari-Ari	Taufiqurrahman Kifu	Indonesia
Before the Sea Forgets		Lê Ngọc Duy	Singapore
Bleat!	கத்து!	Ananth Subramaniam	Malaysia, Philippines, France
Children's Day		Giselle Lin	Singapore
Elenita Elena Elaine		Gabriela Serrano	Philippines
Fresh as Daisy	ស្រស់ដូចផ្កា	Socheata Van	Cambodia
Fruit	Buah	Lim Jen Nee	Singapore
Grandma Nai Who Played Favorites	ចៅសំណព្វចិត្	Chheangkea	Cambodia, France, United States
Hour of the Flower		Grace Song	Singapore
In the Valley	鳥，飛行中	Lim Han Loong	Malaysia
The Last Swimming Reunion Before Life Happens	Yung Huling Swimming Reunion Before Life Happens	Glenn Barit	Philippines
Memory Replica	Ký Ức Ký Ức	Đặng Thảo Nguyên	Vietnam
Monkey		Aries C. Ferrer	Philippines
More Than Happy		Tan Wei Keong	Singapore
My Plastic Mother	Anak Macan	Amar Haikal	Indonesia
Objects Do Not Randomly Fall From The Sky	Kay Basta Angkarabo Yay Bagay Ibat Ha Langit	Maria Estela Paiso	Philippines
Play	Ga Zar Bwal	Myo Aung	Myanmar, Taiwan
Ponay (or You Are Not F***ing Welcome)		Hesome Chemamah	Thailand
Sammi, Who Can Detach His Body Parts		Rein Maychaelson	Indonesia
Through Your Eyes		Nelson Yeo	Singapore
True Love	Chân Tình	Huỳnh Công Nhớ	Vietnam
When the Blues Goes Marching In	Pengais Mimpi	Beny Kristia	Indonesia

=== Singapore Panorama ===
English title	Original title	Director(s)	Production countrie(s)
At Home with Work		Dave Lim, Adar Ng	Singapore
Coda	コーダ	Jac Min	Singapore, Japan
The Old Man and His Car (opening film)	老破車	Michael Kam	Singapore
Sandbox		James Thoo	Singapore

=== Standpoint ===
English title	Original title	Director(s)	Production countrie(s)
It Was Just an Accident	یک تصادف ساده	Jafar Panahi	Iran, France, Luxembourg
Landmarks	Nuestra Tierra	Lucrecia Martel	Argentina, United States, Mexico, France, Netherlands, Denmark
Life After		Reid Davenport	United States
Lost Land	Harà Watan	Akio Fujimoto	Japan, France, Malaysia, Germany
Queer as Punk		Chen Yihwen	Malaysia, Indonesia
Rashid, the Boy from Sinjar (opening film)	Rashid, L'enfant De Sinjar	Jasna Krajinovic	Belgium, France
Waking Hours		Federico Cammarata, Filippo Foscarini	Italy
When Lightning Flashes Over the Sea	Коли над морем спалахує блискавка	Eva Neymann	Ukraine, Germany
Writing Life – Annie Ernaux Through the Eyes of High School Students	Écrire la vie: Annie Ernaux racontée par des lycéennes et des lycéens	Claire Simon	France

=== Undercurrent ===
English title	Original title	Director(s)	Production countrie(s)
Bouchra		Meriem Bennani, Orian Barki	Italy, Morocco, United States
Dry Leaf	ხმელი ფოთოლი	Alexandre Koberidze	Germany, Georgia
Resurrection	狂野时代	Bi Gan	China, France
Underground	アンダーグラウンド	Kaori Oda	Japan

=== Horizon ===
English title	Original title	Director(s)	Production countrie(s)
10s Across the Borders		Chan Sze-Wei	Philippines, Singapore, Germany
Becoming Human	ជាតិជាមនុស្សា	Polen Ly	Cambodia
Bring Him Down to a Portable Size	兄を持ち運べるサイズに	Ryōta Nakano	Japan, France, China
Diamonds in the Sand		Janus Victoria	Philippines, Japan, Malaysia
The Fox King		Woo Ming Jin	Malaysia, Indonesia
Hen (opening film)	Kota	György Pálfi	Greece, Germany, Hungary
I Only Rest in the Storm	O Riso e a Faca	Pedro Pinho	Portugal, France, Brazil, Romania
Kokuho	国宝	Lee Sang-il	Japan
La grazia		Paolo Sorrentino	Italy
Memory of Princess Mumbi		Damien Hauser	Kenya, Switzerland, Saudi Arabia
My Father's Shadow		Akinola Davies Jr.	United Kingdom, Nigeria
The Mysterious Gaze of the Flamingo	La Misteriosa Mirada Del Flamenco	Diego Cespedes	Chile, France, Germany, Spain, Belgium
Sound of Falling	In die Sonne schauen	Mascha Schilinski	Germany
Vanilla	Vainilla	Mayra Hermosillo	Mexico
What Does That Nature Say to You	그 자연이 네게 뭐라고 하니	Hong Sang-soo	South Korea

=== Foreground ===
English title	Original title	Director(s)	Production countrie(s)
Arco (opening film)		Ugo Bienvenu	France
Father Mother Sister Brother		Jim Jarmusch	United States, Ireland, France
Hamnet		Chloé Zhao	United Kingdom
How Dare You?	ふつうの子ども	Mipo O	Japan
Late Fame		Kent Jones	United States
Lesbian Space Princess		Emma Hough Hobbs, Leela Varghese	Australia
Rabbit Trap		Bryn Chainey	United Kingdom, United States
Rental Family		Hikari	United States, Japan
The Secret Agent	O Agente Secreto	Kleber Mendonça Filho	Brazil, France, Germany, Netherlands
Sentimental Value		Joachim Trier	Norway, France, Germany, Denmark, Sweden, United Kingdom
She's Got No Name	酱园弄•悬案	Peter Chan	China
Special Presentation
This City Is a Battlefield	Perang Kota	Mouly Surya	Indonesia, Singapore, the Netherlands, France, Norway, Philippines, Cambodia

=== Landmark ===
English title	Original title	Director(s)	Production countrie(s)
The Arch (1968)	董夫人	Tang Shu Shuen	Hong Kong
Bye Bye Love (1974) (opening film)	バイバイ・ラブ	Isao Fujisawa	Japan
Dream of the Red Chamber (1977)	新潮紅樓夢	Chiu Kang-chien	Singapore
The Girls (1978)	ගැහැණු ළමයි	Sumitra Peries	Sri Lanka
Matador (1986)		Pedro Almodóvar	Spain
The Razor's Edge (1985)	غزل البنات	Jocelyne Saab	France, Lebanon
Deepa Mehta In Focus
Earth (1998)	पृथ्वी	Deepa Mehta	India, Canada
Fire (1996)	आग	Deepa Mehta	Canada
Funny Boy (2020)		Deepa Mehta	Sri Lanka, Canada
Water (2005)	जल	Deepa Mehta	Sri Lanka, Canada

== Awards ==
The following awards were presented at the festival:

=== Asian Feature Film Competition ===
- Best Asian Feature Film: Always by Deming Chen
  - Special Mention: A Useful Ghost by Ratchapoom Boonbunchachoke
- Best Director: Lalith Rathnayake for Riverstone
- FIPRESCI Award: Human Resource by Nawapol Thamrongrattanarit

=== Southeast Asian Short Film Competition ===
- Best Southeast Asian Short Film: Through Your Eyes by Nelson Yeo
  - Special Mention: True Love by Huỳnh Công Nhớ
- Best Singapore Short Film: Children's Day by Giselle Lin
- Best Director: Ananth Subramaniam for Bleat!
- Best Cinematography: Batara Goempar for Sammi, Who Can Detach His Body Parts

=== Best Performance ===
The nominations for Best Performance were announced on November 4 and 5.

Best Performance for Asian Feature Film Competition: Mahendra Perera – Riverstone; Apasiri Nitibhon – A Useful Ghost; Bhushaan Manoj – Cactus Pears; Davika Hoorne – A Useful Ghost; Gaumaya Gurung – Shape of Momo; Hasti Mohammai – Black Rabbit, White Rabbit; Prapamonton Eiamchan – Human Resource; Randika Gunathilaka – Riverstone; Ranice Tay – Amoeba; Sara Minami – MAG MAG; Shim Eun-kyung – Two Seasons, Two Strangers; Suraaj Suman – Cactus Pears	Best Performance for Southeast Asian Short Film Competition: Tysha Khan – Fruit; Agot Isidro – Elenita Elena Elaine; Bonrotanak Rith – Grandma Nai Who Played Favorites; Emma Lim – Children's Day; Hana Nadira – Fruit; Katelynn Foo – Hour of the Flower; Muhammad Alfat Apriansyah – My Plastic Mother; Nai Djenar Maesa Ayu – Sammi, Who Can Detach His Body Parts; Pathavee Thepkraiwan – Ponay (or You Are Not F***ing Welcome); Sopheanith Thong – Fresh as Daisy

=== Audience Choice Award ===
- Coda by Jac Min

=== Cinema Honorary Award ===
- Deepa Mehta

=== Screen Icon Award ===
- Youn Yuh-jung
