= 2025 BFI London Film Festival =

Annual Film Festival in London

69th BFI London Film Festival
- Opening film: Wake Up Dead Man: A Knives Out Mystery
- Closing film: 100 Nights of Hero
- Location: London, United Kingdom
- Founded: 1957
- No. of films: 247
- Festival date: 8–19 October 2025
- Website: whatson.bfi.org.uk/lff/Online/default.asp

BFI London Film Festival
- 2026 2024

The 69th BFI London Film Festival took place from 8 to 19 October 2025. The competition films were announced on 21 August 2025 while the films for the galas and the strands were revealed on 3 September 2025. The festival showcased 247 films from 79 countries and opened with the 2025 American mystery film Wake Up Dead Man: A Knives Out Mystery, written and directed by Rian Johnson, and closed with the 2025 historical fantasy film 100 Nights of Hero written and directed by Julia Jackman.

== Juries ==
The jury members were as follows:

=== Main Competition ===
- Elizabeth Karlsen, American-British film producer and co-founder of Number 9 Films – Jury president
- Justin Chang, American film critic and Pulitzer Prize winner
- Kahlil Joseph, American filmmaker and co-founder of The Underground Museum in Los Angeles

=== First Feature Competition (Sutherland Award) ===
- Kibwe Tavares, British filmmaker and architect – Jury president
- Anja Fröhner, Head of Programme at Zurich Film Festival
- Nadia Latif, British theatre maker and film director

=== Documentary Competition (Grierson Award) ===
- Eloïse King, British filmmaker – Jury president
- Josh Siegel, curator at the Museum of Modern Art and founding director of To Save and Project: The MoMA International Festival of Film Preservation
- Reece Goodwin, Film & TV Curator at the Australian Centre for the Moving Image (ACMI)

=== Short Film Competition ===
- Ming-Jung Kuo, British festival programmer – Jury president
- Matty Crawford, British-Filipino writer and director
- Lee Ott, animation director

== Headline Galas ==
English Title	Original Title	Director(s)	Production Country
Opening Night Gala
Wake Up Dead Man: A Knives Out Mystery		Rian Johnson	United States
Closing Night Gala
100 Nights of Hero		Julia Jackman	United Kingdom, United States
American Express Gala
Rental Family		Hikari	United States
BFI Patron's Gala
H Is for Hawk		Philippa Lowthorpe	United Kingdom
Mayor of London's Gala
Hamnet		Chloé Zhao	United Kingdom
Cunard Gala
Jay Kelly		Noah Baumbach	United States, United Kingdom, Italy
Gala
After the Hunt		Luca Guadagnino	United States
Ballad of a Small Player		Edward Berger	United Kingdom
Blue Moon		Richard Linklater	United States, Ireland
Bugonia		Yorgos Lanthimos	United Kingdom
The Choral		Nicholas Hytner	United Kingdom
Christy		David Michôd	United States
Die My Love		Lynne Ramsay	United States
Frankenstein		Guillermo del Toro	United States
The History of Sound		Oliver Hermanus	United States, United Kingdom, Italy
Is This Thing On?		Bradley Cooper	United States
It Was Just an Accident	یک تصادف ساده	Jafar Panahi	Iran, France, Luxembourg
The Mastermind		Kelly Reichardt	United States
No Other Choice	어쩔수가없다	Park Chan-wook	South Korea
Nouvelle Vague		Richard Linklater	France
Pillion		Harry Lighton	United Kingdom
Roofman		Derek Cianfrance	United States
Sentimental Value	Affeksjonsverdi	Joachim Trier	Norway, France, Germany
Springsteen: Deliver Me from Nowhere		Scott Cooper	United States
Tuner (surprise film)		Daniel Roher	United States, Canada

== Special Presentations ==
English Title	Original Title	Director(s)	Production Country
Afterlives		Kevin B. Lee	Germany, Belgium, France
Broken English		Iain Forsyth, Jane Pollard	United Kingdom
The Death of Bunny Munro (series; ep. 1–2)		Isabella Eklöf	United Kingdom
Maspalomas		Aitor Arregi, Jose Mari Goenaga	Spain
Now Is When We Are (The Stars)		Andrew Schneider	United States
Sholay (director's cut)		Ramesh Sippy	India

== Competition ==
=== Official Competition ===
English Title	Original Title	Director(s)	Production Country
Bad Apples		Jonatan Etzler	United Kingdom
Black Is Beautiful: The Kwame Brathwaite Story		Yemi Bamiro	United Kingdom, United States
Black Rabbit, White Rabbit		Shahram Mokri	Tajikistan, United Arab Emirates
Hair, Paper, Water...	Tóc, giấy và nước...	Nicolas Graux, Trương Minh Quý	Belgium, France, Vietnam
Hedda		Nia DaCosta	United States
Our Land	Nuestra tierra	Lucrecia Martel	Argentina, United States, Mexico, France, Netherlands
Rose of Nevada		Mark Jenkin	United Kingdom
The Testament of Ann Lee		Mona Fastvold	United Kingdom
The Voice of Hind Rajab	صوت هند رجب	Kaouther Ben Hania	Tunisia, France
The World of Love	세계의 주인	Yoon Ga-eun	South Korea

Highlighted title indicates the section winner.

=== First Feature Competition ===
The following films competed for the Sutherland Award, which is awarded to a directorial debut:

English Title	Original Title	Director(s)	Production Country
Becoming Human	Chiet Chea Manusa	Polen Ly	Cambodia, United States
Diamonds in the Sand	孤獨大叔出走中	Janus Victoria	Japan, Malaysia, Philippines
Dreamers		Joy Gharoro-Akpojotor	United Kingdom
Ish		Imran Perretta	United Kingdom
Mad Bills to Pay (or Destiny, dile que no soy malo)		Joel Alfonso Vargas	United States
My Father's Shadow		Akinola Davies Jr.	United Kingdom, Nigeria
One Woman One Bra		Vincho Nchogu	Kenya, Nigeria
Sink		Zain Duraie	Jordan, Saudi Arabia, Qatar, France
Songs of Forgotten Trees		Anuparna Roy	India
A Useful Ghost	ผีใช้ได้ค่ะ	Ratchapoom Boonbunchachoke	Thailand, France, Singapore, Germany

Highlighted title indicates the section winner.

=== Documentary Competition ===
The following films will compete for the Grierson Awards, which is awarded to the Best Documentary of the competition.

English Title	Original Title	Director(s)	Production Country
Always	从来	Deming Chen	United States, China
The Eyes of Ghana		Ben Proudfoot	United States
Life After		Reid Davenport	United States
Only on Earth	Sólo en la tierra	Robin Petré	Denmark, Spain
Seeds		Brittany Shyne	United States
Singing Wings		Hemen Khaledi	Iran, Georgia, Belgium
Super Nature		Ed Sayers	United Kingdom
The Travellers	Les Voyageurs	David Bingong	Cameroon, Spain

Highlighted title indicates the section winner.

=== Short Films Competition ===
The following films will compete for the Short Film award.

English Title	Original Title	Director(s)	Production Country
Capybaras	Los Carpinchos	Alfredo Soderguit	France, Uruguay, Chile
Coyotes		Said Zagha	Palestine, United Kingdom, France, Jordan
Elephant Families		Elena Escalante	United Kingdom, Spain
Happiness		Firat Yücel	Netherlands, Turkey
Hope is Lost		Eno Enefiok	United Kingdom, North Macedonia
Ka Ba Ddi: A Breath, a Move, a Game		Alia Syed	United Kingdom
Magid / Zafar		Luís Hindman	United Kingdom
Nostalgie		Kathryn Ferguson	United Kingdom
We Had Fun		Linda Lô	France
Womb		Ira Hetaraka	New Zealand

Highlighted title indicates the section winner.

== Thematic strands ==
=== Love ===
English Title	Original Title	Director(s)	Production Country
& Sons		Pablo Trapero	United Kingdom, Canada
Calle Málaga		Maryam Touzani	Morocco, France, Spain, Germany, Belgium
D is for Distance		Christopher Petit, Emma Matthews	Finland
Endless Cookie		Seth Scriver, Peter Scriver	Canada
Father Mother Sister Brother		Jim Jarmusch	United States, Ireland, France, Italy, Japan
Human Resource		Nawapol Thamrongrattanarit	Thailand
Kim Novak's Vertigo		Alexandre O. Philippe	United States
Left-Handed Girl	左撇子女孩	Shih-Ching Tsou	United States, United Kingdom, France, Taiwan
Love, Brooklyn		Rachael Abigail Holder	United States
Love Me Tender		Anna Cazenave Cambet	France
The Love That Remains	Ástin Sem Eftir Er	Hlynur Pálmason	Iceland, Denmark, France, Finland, Sweden
Resurrection	狂野时代	Bi Gan	China, France
Romería		Carla Simón	Spain, Germany
A Sad and Beautiful World	نجوم الأمل و الألم	Cyril Aris	Lebanon, United States, Germany, Saudi Arabia, Qatar
The Souffleur		Gastón Solnicki	Austria, Argentina
The Thing with Feathers		Dylan Southern	United Kingdom
Train Dreams		Clint Bentley	United States

=== Debate ===
English Title	Original Title	Director(s)	Production Country
Cover-Up		Laura Poitras, Mark Obenhaus	United States
The Deal		Jean-Stéphane Bron	Switzerland, France, Luxembourg, Belgium
Island of the Winds	大風之島	Hsu Ya-Ting	Taiwan, Japan, France
John Lilly and the Earth Coincidence Control Office		Michael Almereyda, Courtney Stephens	United States
Kontinental '25		Radu Jude	Romania, Brazil, Switzerland, United Kingdom, Luxembourg
Love+War		Elizabeth Chai Vasarhelyi, Jimmy Chin	United States
Mother	Мајка	Teona Strugar Mitevska	North Macedonia, Belgium, Sweden, Denmark, Bosnia and Herzegovina, India
Orwell: 2+2=5		Raoul Peck	United States, France
Saipan		Glenn Leyburn, Lisa Barros D'Sa	United Kingdom, Ireland
Silent Friend	Stille Freundin	Ildikó Enyedi	Germany, France, Hungary

=== Laugh ===
English Title	Original Title	Director(s)	Production Country
Fwends		Sophie Somerville	Australia
The Kidnapping of Arabella	Il rapimento di Arabella	Carolina Cavalli	Italy
More Life		Bradley Banton	United Kingdom, Denmark
Olmo		Fernando Eimbcke	United States, Mexico
She's the He		Siobhán McCarthy	United States
Twinless		James Sweeney	United States
Untamable		Thomas Ngijol	France
What Marielle Knows	Was Marielle weiß	Frédéric Hambalek	Germany

=== Dare ===
English Title	Original Title	Director(s)	Production Country
Alpha		Julia Ducournau	France, Belgium
Anemone		Ronan Day-Lewis	United Kingdom, United States
The Assistant	Człowiek do wszystkiego	Wilhelm Sasnal, Anka Sasnal	Poland, United Kingdom
Blue Heron		Sophy Romvari	Canada, Hungary
The Chronology of Water		Kristen Stewart	France, Latvia, United Kingdom, United States
The Devil Smokes (and Saves the Burnt Matches in the Same Box)	El Diablo Fuma (y guarda las cabezas de los cerillos quemados en la misma caja)	Ernesto Martínez Bucio	Mexico
Dreams		Michel Franco	United States, Mexico
Dry Leaf	ხმელი ფოთოლი	Alexandre Koberidze	Germany, Georgia
The Fence	Le Cri des Gardes	Claire Denis	France
Good Boy		Jan Komasa	Poland, United Kingdom
Hamlet		Aneil Karia	United Kingdom
The Ice Tower	La Tour de glace	Lucile Hadžihalilović	France, Germany, Italy
Lady		Samuel Abrahams	United Kingdom
Magellan	Magalhães	Lav Diaz	Portugal, Spain, Philippines, France, Taiwan
Memory of Princess Mumbi		Damien Hauser	Kenya, Switzerland, Saudi Arabia
Short Summer		Nastia Korkia	Germany, France, Serbia
Sirāt		Óliver Laxe	Spain, France
Sound of Falling	In die Sonne schauen	Mascha Schilinski	Germany
Straight Circle		Oscar Hudson	United States, United Kingdom, South Africa

=== Thrill ===
English Title	Original Title	Director(s)	Production Country
At the Place of Ghosts	Sk+te’kmujue’katik	Bretten Hannam	Canada, Belgium
Balearic		Ion de Sosa	Spain, France
Giant		Rowan Athale	United Kingdom, United States
If I Had Legs I'd Kick You		Mary Bronstein	United States
Lurker		Alex Russell	United States
Miroirs No. 3		Christian Petzold	Germany
A Private Life	Vie privée	Rebecca Zlotowski	France
Retreat		Ted Evans	United Kingdom
The Secret Agent	O Agente Secreto	Kleber Mendonça Filho	Brazil
Ultras		Ragnhild Ekner	Sweden, Denmark, Finland
Wasteman		Cal McMau	United Kingdom

=== Cult ===
English Title	Original Title	Director(s)	Production Country
ChaO	チァオ	Yasuhiro Aoki	Japan
Decorado		Alberto Vázquez	Spain, Portugal
Exit 8	8番出口	Genki Kawamura	Japan
Fucktoys		Annapurna Sriram	United States
The Holy Boy	La valle dei sorrisi	Paolo Strippoli	Italy, Slovenia
Honey Bunch		Madeleine Sims-Fewer, Dusty Mancinelli	Canada
Reflection in a Dead Diamond	Reflet dans un diamant mort	Hélène Cattet, Bruno Forzani	Belgium, Luxembourg, Italy, France
The Vile		Majid Al Ansari	United Arab Emirates, United States

=== Journey ===
English Title	Original Title	Director(s)	Production Country
Below the Clouds	Sotto le nuvole	Gianfranco Rosi	Italy
The Blue Trail	O Último Azul	Gabriel Mascaro	Brazil, Mexico, Chile, Netherlands
Enzo		Robin Campillo	France
La grazia		Paolo Sorrentino	Italy
High Wire		Calif Chong	United Kingdom
Lucky Lu		Lloyd Lee Choi	Canada, United States
Orphan	Árva	László Nemes	Hungary, France, Germany, United Kingdom
A Pale View of Hills		Kei Ishikawa	United Kingdom, Japan, Poland
Palestine 36	فلسطين ٣٦	Annemarie Jacir	Palestine, United Kingdom, France, Denmark, Qatar, Saudi Arabia, Jordan
Portobello (Two episodes)		Marco Bellocchio	Italy, France
The President's Cake	مملكة القصب	Hasan Hadi	Iraq, United States, Qatar
Promised Sky	Promis le ciel	Erige Sehiri	France, Tunisia, Qatar
Redoubt	Värn	John Skoog	Sweden, Denmark, Netherlands, Poland, Finland, United Kingdom, Switzerland
The Son and the Sea		Stroma Cairns	United Kingdom, United States
Têtes Brûlées		Maja-Ajmia Yde Zellama	Belgium
Two Prosecutors		Sergei Loznitsa	France, Germany, Romania, Latvia, Netherlands, Lithuania
Weightless	Vægtløs	Emilie Thalund	Denmark

=== Create ===
English Title	Original Title	Director(s)	Production Country
Ariel		Lois Patiño	Spain, Portugal
BLKNWS: Terms & Conditions		Kahlil Joseph	United States
DJ Ahmet		Georgi M. Unkovski	North Macedonia, Czech Republic, Serbia, Croatia
Duse		Pietro Marcello	Italy, France
Future Botanica		Marcel van Brakel, Hazal Ertürkan	Netherlands
Khartoum	الخرطوم	Anas Saeed, Rawia Alhag, Ibrahim Snoopy Ahmad, Timeea Mohamed Ahmed, Philip Cox	Sudan, United Kingdom, Germany, Qatar
Mare's Nest		Ben Rivers	United Kingdom, France, Canada
Moss & Freud		James Lucas	United Kingdom, New Zealand
Peter Hujar's Day		Ira Sachs	United States
The Stranger	L'Étranger	François Ozon	France, Belgium

=== Experimenta ===
English Title	Original Title	Director(s)	Production Country
The Memory of Butterflies	La memoria de las mariposas	Tatiana Fuentes Sadowski	Peru, Portugal
With Hasan in Gaza		Kamal Aljafari	Germany, Palestine, France, Qatar

=== Family ===
English Title	Original Title	Director(s)	Production Country
Animal Farm		Andy Serkis	Canada, United Kingdom, United States
Finding Optel		Jesse Brown, Mikayla Joy Brown	South Africa
Little Amélie or the Character of Rain	Amélie et la métaphysique des tubes	Maïlys Vallade, Liane-Cho Han	France, Belgium
The Songbird’s Secret	Le Secret des Mésanges	Antoine Lanciaux	France
Whispers in the Woods	Le Chant des forêts	Vincent Munier	France

== Short films ==
The short film programme was divided into the following sections. Short films already mentioned within the Short Films competition are not included.

=== Are You Kidding? ===
English Title	Original Title	Director(s)	Production Country
Little Monsters	Les Petits Monstres	Pablo Léridon	France
Candy Bar		Nash Edgerton	Australia
Crab No. 7		Victor Nauwynck, Shir Ariya	United Kingdom
Mother Goose		Joanna Vymeris	United Kingdom
The Wasp or The Sheer Beauty of Accepting Yourself		Cass Virdee	United Kingdom
Party Animal		Ali Gill	United Kingdom
End of Play		Edem Wornoo	United Kingdom
Whitch		Hoku Uchiyama	United States

=== Discovering Home ===
English Title	Original Title	Director(s)	Production Country
Ackee and Saltfish		Jasmin Nunes	United Kingdom
Seventeen		Ajuan Isaac-George	United Kingdom
So Here We Are		Warren Mendy, Mahaila Palmer	United Kingdom
I Saw the Face of God in the Jet Wash		Mark Jenkin	United Kingdom
Under the Wave Off Little Dragon		Luo Jian	United Kingdom

=== Mapped Out Futures ===
English Title	Original Title	Director(s)	Production Country
Forgotten Routes		Varta Arutiunian	United Kingdom
My Blood is Palestinian		Jay Scanlan-Oumow, Omar Ismail	United Kingdom
Baby		Simisolaoluwa Akande	United Kingdom
Original Sin		Amrou Al-Kadhi	United Kingdom
Highway to the Moon		Letitia Wright	United Kingdom

=== Pulling the Rug Out ===
English Title	Original Title	Director(s)	Production Country
Chimera		Eamonn Hearns	United Kingdom
Flock		Mac Nixon	United Kingdom
Speak with the Dead		Stephanie Paris	United States
Shiny Precious Things		Villő Krisztics	United Kingdom
God is Shy		Jocelyn Charles	France
Grandma is Thirsty		Kris Carr	United Kingdom

=== Roots and Branches ===
English Title	Original Title	Director(s)	Production Country
You Can Call Me Lou		Georgia Zeta Gkoka	United Kingdom, Greece
Beyond the Rush		Niyadre	United Kingdom
Chikha		Zahoua Raji, Ayoub Layoussifi	France, Morocco
Dust to Dreams		Idris Elba	Nigeria

=== Show Me Who I Am ===
English Title	Original Title	Director(s)	Production Country
The Devil and the Bicycle		Sharon Hakim	France
22+1		Pippa Bennett-Warner	United Kingdom
Red Egg & Ginger		Olivia Owyeung	United Kingdom
Sweet Talkin’ Guy		Dylan Wardwell, Spencer Wardwell	United Kingdom
Crusts		India Sleem	United Kingdom
Dark Skin Bruises Differently		Susan Wokoma	United Kingdom

=== Experimenta Shorts ===
Anatomy of Place, Sites of Becoming

English Title	Original Title	Director(s)	Production Country
The House Was There Before Me		Elian Mikkola	Canada
Fugue Notes		Selina Ershadi	New Zealand
Radius Catastrophe		Jad Youssef	Lebanon

Back and Forth Across the Line

English Title	Original Title	Director(s)	Production Country
Border as Interface		Petra Szemán	United Kingdom, Japan
Nsala		Mickael-sltan Mbanza	Congo
The Conjured Ones	Los Conjurados	Humberto González Bustillo	Venezuela, Argentina
Terror Element		Anna Engelhardt, Mark Cinkevich	United Kingdom, Netherlands

Cadences of Refusal

English Title	Original Title	Director(s)	Production Country
Daria's Night Flowers		Maryam Tafakory	Iran, United Kingdom, France
New Territories (Spectacle is King)		Rhea Storr	United Kingdom
Tuktuit: Caribou		Lindsay McIntyre	Canada
Another Other		Bex Oluwatoyin Thompson	United States
Morning Circle		Basma al-Sharif	Germany, Canada, United Arab Emirates

In the Clouds Flecks of Memories Pass By

English Title	Original Title	Director(s)	Production Country
The Early Sun, Red as a Hunter's Moon		Adam Piron	United States
She's Waiting for the Sunset		Martyna Ratnik	Lithuania
Nothing Out of the Island: Bridges	Nada fuera de la Isla: Puentes	Dalissa Montes de Oca Mosquea	Dominican Republic, United States
Half Memory		Ufuoma Essi	United Kingdom, United States, France

Shadows of the Living

English Title	Original Title	Director(s)	Production Country
Primate Visions; Macaque Macabre		Natasha Tontey	Indonesia, Switzerland
Hedgehog Cakes: Sweet Weapon of Terror		Zhenia Stepanenko	Ukraine
Fragments for Venus		Alice Diop	Italy, France
Resurrect Me as a Parasite		Gabi Dao, Lou Lou Sainsbury	United Kingdom, Netherlands, Canada

=== Animated Shorts for Younger Audiences ===
English Title	Original Title	Director(s)	Production Country
Mushroom's Life	Sēnes dzīve	Ēvalds Lācis	Latvia
Cardboard		J.P. Vine	United Kingdom
Snow Bear		Aaron Blaise	United States
The Naughty Seat		David Johnson	United Kingdom
House Trap		George Hampshire	Netherlands
The Big Bad Wolf		Leo Wright	United Kingdom
ForeverGreen		Nathan Engelhardt, Jeremy Spears	United States

== Archive ==
English Title	Original Title	Director(s)	Production Country
The Girls (1978)	ගැහැණු ළමයි	Sumitra Peries	Sri Lanka
Hotel London (1987)		Ahmed Alauddin Jamal	United Kingdom
La Paga (1962)		Ciro Durán	Colombia, Venezuela
Mortu Nega (1988)		Flora Gomes	Guinea-Bissau
Wild Style (1982)		Charlie Ahearn	United States

== Awards ==
The following awards were presented:

=== In competition ===
- Best Film: Our Land, dir. Lucrecia Martel
- Best First Feature (Sutherland Award for Best First Feature): One Woman One Bra, dir. Vincho Nchogu
- Best Documentary (Grierson Award for Best Documentary): The Travellers, dir. David Bingong
  - Special Mention: Always, dir. Deming Chen
- Best Short Film: Coyotes, dir. Said Zagha

=== Audience awards ===
- Best Feature Film: Hamnet, dir. Chloé Zhao
- Best British Discovery: Black Is Beautiful: The Kwame Brathwaite Story, dir. Yemi Bamiro
