= Shahrzad Seifi =

Iranian producer and actress (born 1986)

- Born: Tehran, Iran
- Occupations: Film Producer; actress
- Notable work: Killing the Eunuch Khan (2021) Simulation (2017) Fish & Cat (2013)

Shahrzad Seifi (born 1986 in Tehran, Iran), is an Iranian producer and actress.

== Professional career ==
She was the executive producer and also played role in Shahram Mokri's feature films Fish & Cat which Won the Horizon Prize in Venice Film Festival (2013).

She also produced Simulation and Killing the Eunuch Khan which were directed by Abed Abest. She is the founder and CEO of Hich Film film company. Her last film "Killing the Eunuch Khan" won the Slamdance Grand Jury Award (2022) and premiered at 21st Transilvania International Film Festival.

== Filmography ==
Year	Title	Writer	Director	Producer	Actor	Time	Notes
2013	Fish & Cat	Shahram Mokri	Shahram Mokri	Yes		134 minutes	Shahrzad Seifi was the executive producer of this film, Won the Orizzonti/ Horizon Prize in Venice Film Festival (2013); Won the best film award in Lisbon International Film Festival (2013); Won special jury feature prize in Dubai International Film Festival (2014); Won best film award in International Istanbul Film Festival (2014); Won special jury award in Fribourg International Film Festival (2014); Won the audience award in Slovenia bled film festival (2014); Won best film award in Slovenia bled film festival (2014); Won special jury award in Iran's Film Critics and Writers Association (2014); Won best director award in Vietnam Film Festival (2015)
2017	Simulation	Abed Abest	Abed Abest	Yes	Yes	84 minutes	Shahrzad Seifi acted as Elham, Nominated for best film award in Transilvania International Film Festival (2017); Nominated for best film award in Ars independent festival (2017); Won best film award in Spain moving images festival (2018); Nominated for best film in discovery section in Toronto International Film Festival (2017)
2021	Killing the Eunuch Khan	Abed Abest	Abed Abest	Yes		110 minutes	Nominated for best film in 25th edition of Tallinn Black Nights Film Festival (2021) Nominated for ICFT-UNESCO Gandhi Medal at International Film Festival of India (2021) Won the Grand Jury Award in Breakouts Section at Slamdance Film Festival (2022) Premiered at International Film Festival of Kerala (2022) Premiered at Golden Horse Film Festival and Awards (2022) Nominated for Best Film Award at International Fantastic Film Festival of Porto Alegre (FANTASPOA) (2022) Premiered at Revelation Perth International Film Festival (2022) Premiered at No Limit section of Transilvania International Film Festival (TIFF) (2022) Premiered at Feature Narrative section of Revelation Perth International Film Festival (2022)
