= George Corner =

George Corner may refer to:

- George W. Corner (1889–1981), American physician, embryologist and pioneer of the contraceptive pill
- George Richard Corner (1801–1863), English antiquarian

== See also ==
- Corner (surname)
