= Corner =

Corner(s) or The Corner(s) may refer to:

== People ==
- Corner (surname)
- House of Cornaro, a noble Venetian family (Corner in Venetian dialect)

== Places ==
- The Corner (Charlottesville, Virginia), a commercial district
- The Corner (Cape Barren Island), a village on Cape Barren Island, Tasmania, Australia
- Corner, Alabama, a community in the United States
- Corner Inlet, Victoria, Australia
- Corner River, a tributary of Harricana River, in Ontario, Canada
- Corner Township, Custer County, Nebraska, a township in the United States
- Corners, Perry County, Missouri, an unincorporated community

== Arts, entertainment, and media ==
=== Film and television ===
- The Corner (1916 film), a 1916 film western
- The Corner (2014 film), a 2014 Iranian drama film
- The Corner, HBO TV series based on Simon and Burns' book
- Corners (TV series), 1980s BBC children's television series

=== Music ===
- The Corner (album), an album by the Hieroglyphics
- "The Corner" (song), a 2005 song by Common
- "Corner", a song by Allie Moss from her 2009 EP Passerby
- "Corner", a song by Blue Stahli from their 2010 album Blue Stahli
- "The Corner", a song by Dermot Kennedy from his 2019 album Without Fear
- "The Corner", a song by Rodney Atkins from his 2011 album Take a Back Road
- "The Corner", a song by Staind from their 2008 album The Illusion of Progress

=== Other uses in arts, entertainment, and media ===
- The Corner, a blog from National Review
- The Corner: A Year in the Life of an Inner-City Neighborhood, a 1997 bestselling book by David Simon & Ed Burns
- Corner painters, a Danish artists association
- Corners, a variation on the Four Seasons card game
- WCNR (106.1 FM "The Corner"), a radio station in Charlottesville, Virginia

== Sports ==
- Corner kick, also known as a corner, a method of restarting play in a game of association football
- Cornerback, also known as corner, a position in American and Canadian football
- Penalty corner, a method of restarting play in field hockey, awarded following an infringement by the defending team
- The area of canvas near any of the four posts in a boxing ring

== Other uses ==
- Corner (fence)
- Corner (geometry), another word for a vertex
- Corner (route), a pattern run by a receiver in American football
- Corner detection, an important task in computer vision
- Müller Corner, a range of yoghurts produced by Müller Dairy
- Corner, a point at which a derivative of a mathematical function is discontinuous
- Corner, a fixed point in metes and bounds surveying
- Corner, an intersection in a road or street

== See also ==
- Angle
- Cornering the market
