= Life After =

Life After may refer to:

- Life After (film), an American documentary
- Life After (musical), a Canadian musical
- "Life After", a song by the New Zealand duo Broods, from their album Don't Feed the Pop Monster
