= Gloria Ramirez =

Gloria Ramirez may refer to:

- Death of Gloria Ramirez
- Gloria Ramirez (Modern Family)
