= Abed Abest =

Iranian director, writer, and actor (born 1987)

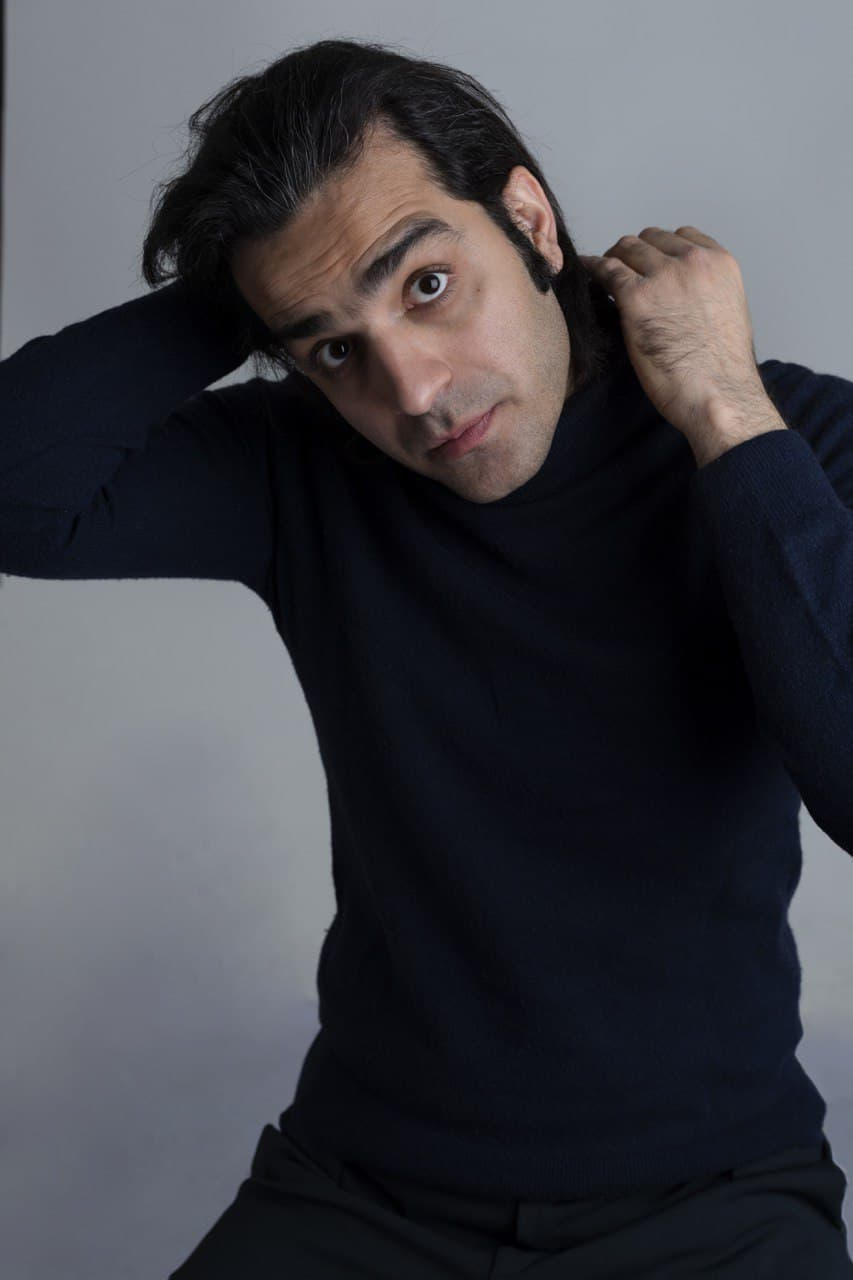
- Born: 21 June 1987 (age 39); Bandar Abbas, Hormozgan Province, Iran
- Occupations: Film director; screenwriter; actor
- Notable work: Invasion (2017) Fish & Cat (2013); First feature film:Simulation (2017); The Corner (2014) (Medium-length film) Second feature film:Killing the Eunuch Khan (2021)

Abed Abest (born 1987, in Bandar Abbas, Iran), is an Iranian director, writer and actor. He played roles in Shahram Mokri's films Fish & Cat which Won the Horizon Prize in Venice Film Festival (2013) and Invasion which was Nominated for Teddy Award in Berlin International Film Festival (2018). His first feature film was Simulation (2017), which world premiered in Berlin International Film Festival (2017) forum section and Won the best film award in Spain moving images film festival (2018). His second feature film Killing the Eunuch Khan (2021) is premiered in the 25th edition of Tallinn Black Nights Film Festival. and won the Grand Jury Prize in Breakouts Section at Slamdance Film Festival

== Filmography ==
Year	Title	Writer	Director	Producer	Actor	Time	Notes
2012	I haven't seen Hussein since the day before yesterday	Yes	Yes	Yes		7 minutes	
2013	Fish & Cat	Shahram Mokri and Nasim Ahmadpoor	Shahram Mokri	Sepehr Seifi	Yes	134 minutes	Abed Abest acted as Parviz, Won the Orizzonti/ Horizon Prize in Venice Film Festival (2013); Won the best film award in Lisbon International Film Festival (2013); Won special jury feature prize in Dubai International Film Festival (2014); Won best film award in International Istanbul Film Festival (2014); Won special jury award in Fribourg International Film Festival (2014); Won the audience award in Slovenia bled film festival (2014); Won best film award in Slovenia bled film festival (2014); Won special jury award in Iran's Film Critics and Writers Association (2014); Won best director award in Vietnam Film Festival (2015)
2014	The Corner	Yes	Yes	Yes	Yes	55 minutes	Abed Abest acted as Amir, Premiered in Cairo International Film Festival
2017	Simulation	Yes	Yes		Yes	84 minutes	Abed Abest acted as Abed, Nominated for best film award in Transilvania International Film Festival (2017); Nominated for best film award in Ars independent festival (2017); Won best film award in Spain moving images festival (2018); Nominated for best film in discovery section in Toronto International Film Festival (2017)
2018	Invasion	Shahram Mokri and Nasim Ahmadpoor	Shahram Mokri	Sepehr Seifi	Yes	102 minutes	Abed Abest acted as Ali, Nominated for Teddy Award in Berlin International Film Festival (2018)
2021	Killing the Eunuch Khan	Yes	Yes	Shahrzad Seifi		110 minutes	Nominated for best film in 25th edition of Tallinn Black Nights Film Festival (2021); Nominated for ICFT-UNESCO Gandhi Medal at International Film Festival of India (2021) Won the Grand Jury Award in Breakouts Section at Slamdance Film Festival (2022) Premiered at International Film Festival of Kerala (2022) Premiered at Golden Horse Film Festival and Awards (2022) Nominated for Best Film Award at International Fantastic Film Festival of Porto Alegre (FANTASPOA) (2022) Premiered at Revelation Perth International Film Festival (2022) Premiered at No Limit section of Transilvania International Film Festival (TIFF) (2022) Premiered at Feature Narrative section of Revelation Perth International Film Festival (2022)
