= Joel Afonso Vargas =

Biography of Award Winning Filmmaker Joel Alfonso Vargas

- Comment: In accordance with Wikipedia's Conflict of interest guideline, I disclose that I have a conflict of interest regarding the subject of this article. Csmith1254 (talk) 09:35, 6 November 2026 (UTC)

== Joel Alfonso Vargas ==
Joel Alfonso Vargas at the 2025 Sundance Film Festival

Joel Alfonso Vargas is a Dominican American film director and screenwriter. He was born in the Inwood section of Manhattan, New York City.

== Early Life and Education ==
Vargas grew up in the Marble Hill Houses, a public housing development in the Bronx, across the bridge from his birthplace. His mother’s family emigrated from the Dominican Republic to the United States in the 1960s in the aftermath of the Dominican Civil War.

Vargas also spent the first four years of his childhood in the Dominican Republic.

Vargas attended Urban Academy Laboratory High School in Manhattan. Upon graduating, he received a Posse Scholarship to attend Lafayette College in Easton, Pennsylvania. Initially pursuing engineering, he later changed his major to film and media studies. He graduated in 2014.

Vargas later enrolled in the Master of Fine Arts program in film production at the USC School of Cinematic Arts. He subsequently dropped out after receiving a Fulbright Scholarship which enabled him to pursue a master’s degree in documentary filmmaking at the University of the Arts London, London College of Communication in the United Kingdom .

== Career ==
Vargas began making films as a teenager working with actors he sourced from Craigslist. Following the completion of his studies in London, he went on to direct several short films, including Swarm: An Anti-Odyssey, which explores themes of migration and displacement, and Nube, which follows the life of an undocumented worker in New York City.

In 2017, Vargas wrote his first feature-length screenplay No Half Steppin' about the life of a Litefeet dancer from the Bronx. The screenplay received a development grant from the Tribeca Film Institute in 2018 and was selected to participate in the Project Forum at the 2018 Gotham Week. In 2018, Vargas received a second grant through a partnership between the Tribeca Film Institute and WarnerMedia 150 to produce Target Is Hiring, a proof-of-concept short film based on his feature screenplay.

Vargas has described his interest in stories exploring themes of migration, diasporic identity, social class, the informal economy and coming-of-age. His filmmaking style draws on observational techniques, non-professional performers and improvisation.

During the COVID-19 pandemic, Vargas returned to the United Kingdom to attend a master’s program in directing at the National Film and Television School. While there he continued making short films set in London and its surroundings.

His thesis film, Que Te Vaya Bonito, Rico (2024), brought him back to the Bronx with a refreshed perspective.

The film had its world premiere at the 77th Locarno Film Festival where Vargas received the Pardi di Domani Award for Best Direction. The film was subsequently distributed by Arte in France and in Germany. Later that year, Vargas was named among Filmmaker Magazine’s 25 New Faces of Independent Film for 2024.

== Mad Bills to Pay ==
Vargas made his feature-film directorial debut with Mad Bills to Pay (or Destiny, dile que no soy malo) an expansion of his award-winning short-film.

The film premiered in the U.S. at the 2025 Sundance Film Festival in the NEXT section where it received a Special Jury Award for Best Ensemble Cast. It subsequently premiered internationally in the Perspectives section of the 75th Berlin International Film Festival where it was nominated for the Best First Feature Award.

The film went on to screen at more than 70 film festivals internationally, receiving several additional awards including; the Grand Prize in the International Competition at the Jeonju International Film Festival;the Golden Coconut Award for Best Director at the Hainan International Film Festival; the Jambor-Franklin Founders Award for Best Narrative Feature at the Sidewalk Film Festival; the American Independent Award for Best Feature Film at the Denver Film Festival; the Mark Urman Award for Fiction Filmmaking at the Montclair Film Festival; the Alexander Mouret Award at the Leiden International Film Festival; the Spirit of Independent Filmmaking Award at the Stony Brook Film Festival; and a Special Mention at the Cinema Tropical Awards in the U.S. Latinx Film category [20].

In August 2025, Mad Bills to Pay was acquired for distribution by Oscilloscope Laboratories. The film received a theatrical release on April 17, 2026 and became available on the Criterion Channel later that year. It was named a New York Times Critics’ Pick and included among IndieWire’s best films of 2026.

In 2026, Vargas received a nomination for Breakthrough Director at the Gotham Awards.

== Filmography ==
1. 2013 – Glass, Sand and Steel
2. 2014 – The Ninth Girl
3. 2015 – Swarm: An Anti-Odyssey
4. 2017 – Nube
5. 2020 – Target Is Hiring
6. 2022 – Daddy’s Girl
7. 2024 – Shadow
8. 2024 – Sohail, Are You Eating and Sleeping Well?
9. 2024 – Que te vaya bonito, Rico
10. 2025 – Mad Bills to Pay

== Awards and nominations ==
Year	Festival	Award	Film	Result
2021	Lower East Side Film Festival	Best Live Action Short Film	Target is Hiring	Won
2024	Locarno Film Festival	Pardi di Domani – Best Direction Award	Que te vaya bonito, Rico	Won
2024	South London Film Festival	Best Student Film	Shadow	Won
2024	NFTS Showcase	Panalux Award for Best Cinematography	Que te vaya bonito, Rico	Won
2025	Sundance Film Festival	NEXT Special Jury Award for Ensemble Cast	Mad Bills to Pay	Won
2025	Sidewalk Film Festival	Jambor-Franklin Founders Award for Best Narrative Feature	Mad Bills to Pay	Won
2025	Denver Film Festival	American Independent Award – Best Feature Film	Mad Bills to Pay	Won
2025	Stony Brook Film Festival	Spirit of Independent Filmmaking Award	Mad Bills to Pay	Won
2025	Jeonju International Film Festival	Grand Prize – International Competition	Mad Bills to Pay	Won
2025	Montclair Film Festival	Future/Now Competition	Mad Bills to Pay	Won
2025	Montclair Film Festival	Mark Urman Award for Fiction Filmmaking	Mad Bills to Pay	Won
2025	Hainan International Film Festival	Golden Coconut Award – Best Director	Mad Bills to Pay	Won
2025	Leiden International Film Festival	Alexander Mouret Award	Mad Bills to Pay	Won
2025	FEST Portugal	Honorable Mention	Mad Bills to Pay	Won
2025	Lower East Side Film Festival	Best of Fest	Mad Bills to Pay	Won
2026	Fargo Film Festival	Best Narrative Feature – Honorable Mention	Mad Bills to Pay	Won
2026	Cinema Tropical Awards	Special Mention – U.S. Latinx Film	Mad Bills to Pay	Won
