= List of Sri Lankan submissions for the Academy Award for Best International Feature Film =

Best International Feature Film submissions from Sri Lanka

Highlights
- Debut: 2003
- Submissions: 3
- Nominations: none
- Oscar winners: none

Sri Lanka is one of over one-hundred countries which have submitted films for the Academy Award for Best International Feature Film. (Note: The category was previously named the Academy Award for Best Foreign Language Film, but this was changed to the Academy Award for Best International Feature Film in April 2019, after the Academy deemed the word "Foreign" to be outdated.) The Academy Award for Best Foreign Language Film is handed out annually by the United States Academy of Motion Picture Arts and Sciences to a feature-length motion picture produced outside the United States that contains primarily non-English dialogue.

As of 2026, Sri Lanka has submitted only three films, but none of them were not nominated.

== Submissions ==
The Academy of Motion Picture Arts and Sciences has invited the film industries of various countries to submit their best film for the Academy Award for Best International Feature Film since 1956. The International Feature Film Committee oversees the process and reviews all the submitted films. Following this, they vote via secret ballot to determine the five nominees for the award.

All the films submitted are primary in Sinhala. Below is a list of the films that have been submitted by Sri Lanka for review by the Academy for the award by year and the respective Academy Awards ceremony.

| Year (Ceremony) | Film title used in nomination | Original title | Language | Director | Result |
|---|---|---|---|---|---|
| 2003 (76th) | Mansion by the Lake | වෑකන්ද වලව්ව | Sinhala | Lester James Peries | Not nominated |
| 2009 (82nd) | The Road from Elephant Pass | අලිමංකඩ | Sinhala, Tamil | Chandran Rutnam | Not nominated |
| 2026 (99th) | Riverstone | රිවස්ටන් | Sinhala | Lalith Rathnayake | Pending |

== See also ==
- List of Academy Award winners and nominees for Best International Feature Film
- List of Academy Award-winning foreign language films
- Cinema of Sri Lanka
