= Children's Day (film) =

2025 Singaporean drama film

- Festival release poster
- Directed by: Giselle Lin
- Screenplay by: Giselle Lin; Nicolette Lin
- Produced by: Sam Weishi Chua; Bambby Cheuk; Macarius Chia
- Starring: Emma Lim; Adele Tong; Oon Shu An; Edward Choy
- Cinematography: Clyde Kam
- Edited by: Gan Bai Lin
- Music by: Wey Yinn Teo
- Production company: Potocol
- Release date: 15 February 2025 (Berlinale)
- Running time: 20 minutes
- Country: Singapore
- Language: English

Children's Day is a 2025 Singaporean coming-of-age, short film co-written and directed by Giselle Lin. The film set in Singapore, follows a shy and imaginative eight-year-old struggles to find the perfect outfit for her school's upcoming Children's Day celebration while adjusting to a turbulent home life and an unlikely new friendship at school.

It was selected in the Berlinale Shorts section at the 75th Berlin International Film Festival, where it had its World premiere on 15 February and competed for Golden Bear for Best Short Film.

== Synopsis ==
In early 2000s Singapore, Xuan, a timid Primary 2 student, is bullied and overlooked by family and peers. She befriends Maggie, a privileged but kind girl, and eagerly plans to wear matching outfits for Children’s Day. Lacking support at home, she struggles to find a suitable top, leading to conflict with her sisters and punishment from their strict father. Despite this, Xuan enjoys the festivities, plays hopscotch with Maggie, and they declare their best-friend status. As Maggie leaves, Xuan smiles hopefully, feeling acknowledged for the first time.

== Cast ==
- Emma Lim as Xuan
- Adele Tong as Maggie
- Oon Shu An as Mummy
- Edward Choy as Papa

== Production ==
In the words of the director Giselle Lin:

The story of the film is inspired by one Children’s Day from when I was eight years old. My best friend (then and now) asked that we match outfits and lipgloss, and I agreed, despite having neither lipgloss nor a new outfit. Children’s Day is an ever-ebbing and flowing love letter to eight-year-old Giselle, and I hope everyone who watches the final film finds a bit of their eight-year-old self in it as well.

== Release ==
Children's Day will have its World premiere on 15 February 2025, as part of the 75th Berlin International Film Festival, in the Berlinale Shorts 2 programme.

It will compete in the Main Program International Short Films at the Zagreb Film Festival for Golden Pram Award on 14 November 2025.

It was selected to compete in the Southeast Asian Short Film Competition of the 36th Singapore International Film Festival and had its Southeast Asian Premiere in the Southeast Asian Short Film Competition Programme 1 on 4 December 2025. It was screened in the Light of Asia 2 section of the 20th Jogja-NETPAC Asian Film Festival on 5 December 2025.

== Accolades ==
Award	Date	Category	Recipient	Result	Ref.
Berlin International Film Festival	23 February 2025	Golden Bear for Best Short Film	Children's Day	Nominated	
Berlin International Film Festival	23 February 2025	Berlinale Shorts CUPRA Filmmaker Award	Children's Day	Nominated	
Singapore International Film Festival	7 December 2025	Best Singapore Short Film	Giselle Lin	Won	
