= Black Rabbit, White Rabbit =

2025 Tajik film

- International promotional poster
- Tajik: Харгӯши сиёҳ, харгӯши сафед
- Directed by: Shahram Mokri
- Screenplay by: Nasim Ahmadpour; Shahram Mokri
- Produced by: Negar Eskandarfar
- Starring: Babak Karimi; Hasti Mohammai; Kibriyo Dilyobova; Bezhan Davlyatov
- Cinematography: Morteza Gheidi
- Edited by: Shahram Mokri
- Music by: Peyman Yazdanian
- Production company: Karnameh Dubai Co.
- Release dates: 21 September 2025 (Busan); 24 September 2025 (Tajikistan)
- Running time: 139 minutes
- Countries: Tajikistan; United Arab Emirates
- Languages: Tajik; Russian

Black Rabbit, White Rabbit (Tajik: Харгӯши сиёҳ, харгӯши сафед) is a 2025 mystery drama film co-written and directed by Iranian filmmaker Shahram Mokri. Starring Babak Karimi, Hasti Mohammai and Kibriyo Dilyobova, it follows three destinies intertwined through apparently unrelated events.

The film had its world premiere at the Visions – Asia section of the 30th Busan International Film Festival on 21 September 2025, and was theatrically released in Tajikistan on 24 September. It was also selected as the Tajikistani entry for the Best International Feature Film at the 98th Academy Awards, but was not on the list of films accepted by the academy.

== Premise ==
The narrative of the film explores fear and fragility within a society shaped by human imperfection. A man dies during an illegal gun deal at an antique shop, triggering a chain of interconnected events involving various individuals. These include a film director remaking a classic Iranian film in Tajikistan, a props manager concerned about a gun on set, an aspiring actress defying her mother, and a wealthy woman feeling trapped in her marriage.

== Cast ==
- Babak Karimi as Babak
- Hasti Mohammai as Sara
- Kibriyo Dilyobova as Donya
- Bezhan Davlyatov as Bezhan

== Release ==
Black Rabbit, White Rabbit had its world premiere at the 30th Busan International Film Festival in the "Visions – Asia" section on 21 September 2025.

It was also selected to compete in the Official Competition section of the 2025 BFI London Film Festival for the best film award and had the screening on 13 October 2025, and in the International Feature Competition of the 61st Chicago International Film Festival for Golden Hugo on 21 October 2025.

It was presented in 'From The Festivals - 2025' section of the 56th International Film Festival of India in November 2025.

It was selected to compete in the Asian Feature Film Competition of the 36th Singapore International Film Festival and had its Southeast Asian Premiere on 30 November 2025.

It competed in the Red Sea: Competition strand at the Red Sea International Film Festival and had screening on 10 December 2025.

The film was released on 24 September at the Vatan Cinema in Tajakistan, and it was selected for consideration as the Tajikistani entry for the Best International Feature Film at the 98th Academy Awards.

== Accolades ==
The film will compete for the Vision Awards at the 30th Busan International Film Festival.

Award	Date of ceremony	Category	Recipient(s)	Result	Ref.
Busan International Film Festival	26 September 2025	International Film Festival of India-Vision Asia Award	Black Rabbit, White Rabbit	Won	
BFI London Film Festival	19 October 2025	Best Film	Black Rabbit, White Rabbit	Nominated	
Chicago International Film Festival	24 October 2025	Golden Hugo	Black Rabbit, White Rabbit	Nominated	

== See also ==
- List of submissions to the 98th Academy Awards for Best International Feature Film
- List of Tajikistani submissions for the Academy Award for Best International Feature Film
