= Shape of Momo =

2025 film by Tribeny Rai

- Nepali: छोरा जस्तै
- Directed by: Tribeny Rai
- Written by: Tribeny Rai; Kislay
- Produced by: Geeta Rai; Kislay
- Starring: Gaumaya Gurung; Pashupati Rai
- Edited by: Aalayam Anil Kumar; Kislay
- Music by: Mikhail Marak
- Production companies: Dalley Khorsani Productions; Kathkala Films; Aizoa Pictures
- Distributed by: Celluloid Dreams
- Release dates: September 2025 (Busan); 29 May 2026 (India)
- Running time: 114 minutes
- Countries: India; South Korea
- Language: Nepali

Shape of Momo (Nepali: छोरा जस्तै, transl. Like a Son) is a 2025 Nepali-language drama film written and directed by Tribeny Rai, in her directorial debut. It is produced by Geeta Rai and Kislay. Zoya Akhtar, Reema Kagti, Payal Kapadia and Mike Goodridge serve as the film's executive producers. Loosely based on Tribeny Rai's own life, it follows Bishnu, a woman who returns to her hometown after quitting her job.

The film had its world premiere at the 30th Busan International Film Festival in September 2025 and was released theatrically on 29 May 2026.

== Premise ==
Bishnu quits her job in Delhi and returns to her mountain village in Sikkim. Dealing with the patriarchal norms of her household, she finds herself grappling with family expectations, societal pressure, and her sense of self.

== Production ==
=== Writing ===
The film was influenced by Rai's own experiences returning to her hometown of Nandok, Sikkim after graduating from film school. She described a "quiet struggle" that many of her peers faced, stating: "We leave the places that shaped us in search of opportunity, freedom and a better life, only to find ourselves belonging nowhere." Rai was influenced by the work of Jia Zhangke, Nuri Bilge Ceylan and Apichatpong Weerasethakul. Rai first pitched the film at a talent camp at the 2019 Fajr International Film Festival. The script was first developed at the Clinik.Kathmandu script lab. The script was further developed at Filmlab South Asia at the Dharamshala International Film Festival. Rai stated that her first draft of the script was "more like a complaint letter" and that co-writer Kislay brought objectivity to the script.

=== Casting ===
Rai stated that she aimed to find an actress for the protagonist that looked like her. Gaumaya Gurung was selected as Bishnu, the lead. Bishnu's mother was played by Pashupati Rai and her grandmother was played by a relative of Rai.

=== Filming ===
Filming began in January 2024 and was shot primarily in Nandok, East Sikkim and Assam-Lingjey, East Sikkim. The film was shot entirely in the Nepali language, Rai's mother tongue. The film crew mostly composed of graduates from SRFTI, where Rai graduated, and FTII.

=== Post-production ===
The film was produced by Dalley Khorsani Production, in association with Kathkala Films and Aizoa Pictures. The film was produced by Geeta Rai and Kislay and co-produced by Neha Malik, Himanshu Kohli, and Jung Woo Lee. Mike Goodridge served as an executive producer. A demo of the film was shown at the 2022 Festival des 3 Continents' Produire au Sud Film Lab (South Asia). Rai stated in November 2024 that the film was in its final stages of editing. It was shown at the November 2024 NFDC Film Bazaar Work-in-Progress Lab. The film completed production in August 2025.

=== Music ===
Mikhail Marak composed the film's score, his debut film score. He met Rai while studying at SRFTI.

== Release ==
A demo of the film was shown at the 49th Hong Kong International Film Festival, where it won the "HAF Goes to Cannes" Award. An excerpt of the film was shown "HAF Goes to Cannes" program at the 2025 Cannes Film Festival in May 2025. It had its world premiere at the 30th Busan International Film Festival in September 2025, where it won the Songwon Vision Award and the Taipei Film Commission Award. Celluloid Dreams acquired global sales rights in September 2025. It was shown at the San Sebastián International Film Festival in September 2025 and was nominated for the New Directors Award. It was shown at the Kolkata International Film Festival, where it won the Golden Royal Bengal Tiger Award, 56th International Film Festival of India, and the 36th Singapore International Film Festival in November 2025.
