= Riverside University Health System Medical Center =

Riverside University Health System - Medical Center
- Riverside County, California

Geography
- Location: Moreno Valley, California, United States
- Coordinates: 33°54′41″N 117°11′45″W

Organization
- Type: Teaching
- Affiliated university: University of California, Riverside, Loma Linda University, Western University of Health Sciences, California Baptist University
- Patron: None

Services
- Emergency department: Level I trauma center
- Beds: 439

History
- Founded: 1893

Links
- Website: https://ruhealth.org/
- Lists: Hospitals in California

The Riverside University Health System - Medical Center, or RUHS-MC, formerly Riverside County Regional Medical Center, or RCRMC, and also formerly Riverside General Hospital University Medical Center, or RGH UMC, is a public teaching hospital located at 26520 Cactus Avenue, Moreno Valley, California, United States, operated by the County of Riverside. It is classified as a Level I Trauma Center.

Founded in 1893, and originally located in downtown Riverside, California, the hospital has since relocated. The current facility opened on March 31, 1998, but for the greatest part of its history the hospital was located at 9851 Magnolia Avenue in Riverside. While at that location, and operating under the name Riverside General Hospital University Medical Center, two nationally followed patient stories developed.

The case of the first patient, Elizabeth Bouvia, in 1983, eventually resulted in a landmark court decision that allows mentally competent adults to refuse forced feeding by patient care facilities, allowing for the possibility of starvation, if the patient cannot otherwise ingest adequate nutrition. The second patient, Gloria Ramirez, in 1994 died in unusual circumstances in which a number of her care-givers were seriously sickened and fainted by what were claimed to be fumes emanating from Ramirez's body.

== History ==
Riverside County was founded on March 11, 1893. On July 18 of the same year, the newly formed Board of Supervisors passed a resolution to lease 40 rooms of the Riverside Hotel, at 57 Evergreen Street, Riverside, California, to serve as a county hospital. The first patient was admitted on July 26, 1893. The site is now the location of North Park, named for the city's founder, John W. North.

In September, 1896, the Riverside County Board of Supervisors purchased the Palma Hotel in San Jacinto, and moved the hospital to that location. Shortly after that, in 1898, the hospital burned to the ground and was temporarily relocated to downtown San Jacinto while the original San Jacinto site was rebuilt.

On December 25, 1899, an earthquake destroyed the newly built brick hospital and patients were relocated to the Arlington Hotel in downtown Riverside.

Early 1900s
In the early 1900s a new all-wood hospital was built at the corner of Magnolia Avenue and Harrison Street in Riverside. Over the next few years, several smaller buildings were added to the hospital campus. A nurse training school was added in 1908. Hospital physicians and the head nurse worked as instructors, at no additional cost to the hospital.

In 1910, the hospital census reflected 50 patients, with a staff of 12. While the influenza epidemic swept through Riverside in 1918, the hospital set a record of 115 patients in just one day, on November 1.

1930s
The Great Depression hit the country hard; tax revenue dropped and patient load skyrocketed. Federal Works Progress Administration funds enabled Riverside County to add some much needed larger buildings for the hospital. The National Youth Administration began training nurses in 1939.

1940s
The defense buildup during World War II created a nurse shortage in 1940 and 1941. Married nurses were hired at the hospital, because the Army had hired all the other nurses. At the same time, the polio rate shot up ten times higher than the previous rate, reaching 73 between May 1946 and May 1947.

1950s
In 1950 the Board of Supervisors adopted a new name for the hospital: General Hospital of Riverside County. The intern training program began the same year. In 1958 and 1959, more buildings were added to the hospital campus, funded by a County general obligation bond measure. The hospital's Auxiliary was founded in 1958, and “Candy Stripers” in 1959.

1960s
Another building began construction in 1960, to replace the old wood building built in 1900. The wood building was demolished. In 1961, the hospital was renamed once again, to Riverside County General Hospital. The facility became a teaching hospital linked to Loma Linda University in 1963, and the Board of Supervisors voted to change the hospital name to Riverside General Hospital/University Medical Center in 1966.

1970s
The first computer was installed at the hospital in 1970. Another new building with operating rooms, an emergency room, and clinic space was finished in 1971. A new chapel was dedicated in 1973, and in 1979, new fire doors were installed throughout the entire hospital – a major safety improvement.

1980s
In 1983, the facility captured the attention of the country as a patient demanded the hospital help her starve to death. Ultimately, the court stepped in and refused to allow the patient to starve. A fire on the third floor in 1986 led to new policy; smoking was banned throughout the facility. Population growth in Riverside County and a steady increase in patient census necessitated planning for a new, larger facility. In 1989, Moreno Valley was chosen as the site for a new county hospital.

1990s
Mental health units shifted off-site in 1990, and several departments moved to make better use of space. The Landers earthquake in 1992 rendered some hospital buildings structurally unsafe, and design of the new facility in Moreno Valley began.

On March 31, 1998, the hospital moved to its new, state-of-the-art facility in Moreno Valley. A new name was adopted: Riverside County Regional Medical Center (RCRMC).

The 21st Century
In August 2004, Riverside County leased a newly built “Annex,” located across campus from RUHS-MC. Several non-patient care departments moved to the Annex to make room for expansion and additional patient care services at RUHS-MC.

== Hospital Superintendents ==
Initially, when a new man was appointed as Superintendent to run the Riverside County Hospital, his wife was appointed to be the Hospital Matron. If their marriage was dissolved, both were forced to resign their respective positions.

Superintendent Name	Start date	End date	Comment
Zachary Taylor Brown	July 19, 1893	January 31, 1895	Also served as County Deputy Sheriff from 1899 to 1907.
Reverdy Harris	February 1, 1895	February 23, 1898	Resigned to mine gold in the Yukon Territory.
Jamison E. Cook	March 9, 1898	June 8, 1899	

== Medical Education ==
The Riverside University Health System - Medical Center residency training programs in family medicine, internal medicine, general surgery, orthopaedic surgery, anesthesiology, emergency medicine, neurosurgery, pharmacy, and a one-year internship.

== Services ==
- Emergency department and trauma center
- In patient treatment facility
- Pharmacy
- Detention care unit
- On site law enforcement (provided by the Riverside County Sheriff's Department)

== Medical school affiliations ==
- University of California, Riverside School of Medicine
- Loma Linda University School of Medicine
- Western University / College of Osteopathic Medicine of the Pacific
- California Baptist University Physician Assistant Program

== In the news ==
- 1983 Elizabeth Bouvia
- 1994 Gloria Ramirez

== See also ==
- Riverside County, California
- Moreno Valley, California
