= Only on Earth =

2025 Spanish documentary film

- Festival release poster
- Spanish: Sólo en la tierra
- Directed by: Robin Petré
- Written by: Robin Petré
- Produced by: Carles Brugueras; Marieke van den Bersselaar; Malene Flindt Pedersen; Signe Skov Thomsen
- Cinematography: Maria Grazia Goya
- Edited by: Charlotte Munch Bengtsen
- Music by: Roger Goula
- Production companies: Polar Star Films; Hansen & Pedersen
- Distributed by: DR Sales; Camera Film; Autlook Filmsales
- Release date: 15 February 2025 (Berlinale)
- Running time: 93 minutes
- Countries: Denmark; Spain
- Languages: Spanish; Galician

Only on Earth is a 2025 Spanish documentary film directed by Robin Petré. The film documents a journey into southern Galicia Spain, one of the most wildfire-prone zones in Europe, where humans and animals alike are struggling to cope with the hottest, driest summer on record.

A Danish–Spanish co-production, the film was selected in the Generation Kplus section at the 75th Berlin International Film Festival, where it had its world premiere on 15 February 2025.

== Summary ==
Only on Earth explores one of Europe’s most fire-prone regions, from Galicia to central Spain and Portugal, during a summer of extreme heat and drought. The documentary follows four individuals—a cowboy, a veterinarian, a firefighter, and a farming family on the frontline—who work to protect their homes, traditions, and environment. It also highlights the vital role of native wild horses in mitigating wildfire damage.

== Appearances ==
- San a firefighter
- Eva a veterinarian
- Pedro a ten-year-old budding cowboy

== Production ==
The film directed by Robin Petré is produced by Carles Brugueras, Malene Flindt Pedersen, Signe Skov Thomsen and Marieke van den Bersselaar, under banners of Hansen & Pedersen Film og Fjernsyn and Polar Star Films.

== Release ==
Only on Earth had its World premiere on 15 February 2025, as part of the 75th Berlin International Film Festival, in Generation Kplus. It was also selected to compete in the Documentary Competition section of the 2025 BFI London Film Festival for the Grierson Award for Best Documentary and had screening on 10 October 2025.

It had its Australian Premiere as part of the documentary feature at the Adelaide Film Festival on 17 October 2025.

Vienna-based sales agency Autlook Filmsales has acquired the international sales rights of the film in January 2025.

== Accolades ==
Award	Date	Category	Recipient	Result	Ref.
CPH:FORUM	24 March 2023	Eurimages Co-production Development Award	Only on Earth	Won	
Berlin International Film Festival	23 February 2025	Grand Prize for Best Film	Robin Petré	Nominated	
Berlin International Film Festival	23 February 2025	Berlinale Documentary Film Award	Robin Petré	Nominated	
BFI London Film Festival	October 19, 2025	Grierson Award for Best Documentary	Robin Petré	Nominated	
