= Killing the Eunuch Khan =

Iranian feature film

- Directed by: Abed Abest
- Written by: Abed Abest
- Produced by: Shahrzad Seifi
- Cinematography: Hamid Khozouie Abyane
- Edited by: Hayedeh Safiyari
- Music by: Christophe Rezai
- Distributed by: Iranian Independent
- Release date: 2021
- Running time: 110 minutes
- Country: Iran
- Languages: Persian, Arabic

Killing the Eunuch Khan (Persian: کشتن خواجه) is a 2021 Iranian sci-fi - crime film directed by Abed Abest and produced by Shahrzad Seifi. The film set in 1980s in the backdrop of Iran–Iraq War follows a serial killer, who uses his victims to kill more victims. It was premiered in the 25th edition of the Tallinn Black Nights Film Festival (2021). It was also selected to compete in ICFT UNESCO Gandhi Medal at the 52nd International Film Festival of India, where it was screened in November 2021. It also premiered in Slamdance Film Festival in January 2022, and was chosen as the Grand Jury Winner of the Breakouts Features.

== Production ==
Killing the Eunuch Khan is Abest's second feature.

== Accolades ==
Year	Country	City	Festival	Section	Nominated	Result	Event date
2021	Estonia	Tallinn (World Premiere)	Tallinn Black Nights Film Festival	Best Film-Official Selection	Abed Abest	Nominated	12-28 Nov 2021
2021	India	Panaji	International Film Festival of India	ICFT-UNESCO Gandhi Medal	Abed Abest	Nominated	20-28 Nov 2021
2022	USA	Park City, Utah	Slamdance Film Festival	Grand Jury Award-Breakouts Section	Abed Abest	Won	27 Jan – 6 Feb 2022
2022	India	Thiruvananthapuram	International Film Festival of Kerala	World Cinema		non-competitive	18–22 March 2022
2022	Taiwan	Taipei	Golden Horse Film Festival and Awards (TGHFF)	The Fantasy of the Year		non-competitive	8–17 April 2022
2022	Brazil	Porto Alegre	International Fantastic Film Festival of Porto Alegre (FANTASPOA)	Best Film	Abed Abest	Nominated	15 April – 1 May 2022
2022	Romania	Cluj-Napoca	Transilvania International Film Festival (TIFF)	No Limit		non-competitive	17 – 26 June 2022
2022	Australia	Perth	Revelation Perth International Film Festival	Feature Narrative			7–17 July 2022

== Reception ==
The film received very positive reviews.

FilmThreat, for example, found that, "The film is an artistic extravaganza with a genre-bending structure and breathtaking imagery. Seldom have the horrors of war have been so well shown in such a spectacularly surreal way." This artistic surreal imagery was also noted in a review in Dmovies but with a more nuanced assessment: "The eventual question is whether Abest is pushing at the boundaries to expand the potential of the film form, or has he been seduced by the dream aesthetic to his detriment? The beauty of David Lynch’s surreal, dreamlike and puzzle box films, is that there were ideas and themes, but here there seems to be none. It’s a dream that could only seem real if we were the dreamer, but we’re not. A deeply subjective work, Killing the Eunuch Khan in moments showcases a seductive aesthetic, but its lack of substance leaves it a challenging film to engage with, beyond superficial admiration."

== See also ==
- 52nd International Film Festival of India
