= Riverstone (film) =

2025 Sri Lankan film

- International promotional poster
- Sinhala: රිවස්ටන්
- Directed by: Lalith Rathnayake
- Written by: Lalith Rathnayake; Nilantha Perera
- Produced by: Prabath Roshan; Nimanthi Porage
- Starring: Mahendra Perera; Randika Gunathilaka; Shyam Fernando; Priyantha Sirikumara
- Cinematography: Prabath Roshan
- Edited by: Thissa Surendra
- Production company: Cinearts Films
- Release date: 20 June 2025
- Running time: 119 minutes
- Country: Sri Lanka
- Language: Sinhala

Riverstone (Sinhala: රිවස්ටන්) is a 2025 Sri Lankan Sinhala-language drama film directed by Lalith Rathnayake. Starring Mahendra Perera, Randika Gunathilaka, Shyam Fernando and Priyantha Sirikumara. Co-written by Rathnayake and Nilantha Perera, it follows three police officers on an arduous road trip across the Knuckles Mountain Range as they escort a handcuffed prisoner to his home village under the constant threat of extrajudicial execution.

The film received critical acclaim across the international festival circuit, winning Best Director awards at both the Singapore and Kolkata International Film Festivals, as well as two Asian New Talent awards at the Shanghai International Film Festival.

It was also selected as the Sri Lankan entry for Best International Feature Film at the 99th Academy Awards.

== Synopsis ==
Three police officers: a senior inspector distracted by a pleading mistress, a constable worried over his hospitalized wife, and a veteran driver tuned into a radio quiz show, are tasked with transporting a political prisoner named Nanditha through the mountainous Knuckles Range to his native village under the implicit threat of his extrajudicial execution. As the arduous journey progresses, the officers' personal preoccupations delay their route, while the observant, well-read captive assists his wardens with local knowledge, medical advice, and trivia answers. This unusual bond exposes the officers' inner hypocrisies and deep-seated ethnic and socio-political divides, transforming a routine transfer into a meditative study of conscience, authority, and human connection in the face of state violence.

== Cast ==
- Mahendra Perera as police driver, Udayasiri
- Randika Gunathilaka as Nanditha
- Shyam Fernando as Inspector Pinnawala
- Priyantha Sirikumara as Constable Chandrapala

== Production ==
Filming took place in Kandy, Digana, Medamahanuwara, and Riverston in Sri Lanka.

== Release ==
The film premiered internationally on June 20, 2025, at the Shanghai International Film Festival. It was also screened at the Singapore International Film Festival in December 2025 under Asian Feature Film Competition. The film was subsequently released theatrically in Sri Lanka on April 10, 2026.

== Accolades ==
Festival	Year	Award	Recipient(s)	Result	Ref.
Shanghai International Film Festival	2025	Asian New Talent Award for Best Script Writer	Lalith Rathnayake and Nilantha Perera	Won	
Shanghai International Film Festival	2025	Asian New Talent Award for Best Cinematography	Prabath Roshan	Won	
Singapore International Film Festival	2025	Best Director for Asian Feature Film Competition	Lalith Rathnayake	Won	
Singapore International Film Festival	2025	Best Performance for Asian Feature Film Competition	Mahendra Perera	Won	
Singapore International Film Festival	2025	Best Performance for Asian Feature Film Competition	Randika Gunathilaka	Nominated	
Kolkata International Film Festival	2025	Golden Royal Bengal Tiger Award for Best Director	Lalith Rathnayake	Won	
Malaysia Golden Global Awards	2026	Best Film	Riverstone	Nominated	
Malaysia Golden Global Awards	2026	Best Director	Lalith Rathnayake	Nominated	
Malaysia Golden Global Awards	2026	Best Actor	Mahendra Perera	Won	
Malaysia Golden Global Awards	2026	Best Actor	Randika Gunathilaka	Nominated	
Malaysia Golden Global Awards	2026	Best Supporting Actor	Priyantha Sirikumara	Won	
Malaysia Golden Global Awards	2026	Best Screenplay	Lalith Rathnayake and Nilantha Perera	Nominated	

== See also ==
- List of Sri Lankan submissions for the Academy Award for Best International Feature Film
- List of submissions to the 99th Academy Awards for Best International Feature Film
