= Careless Crime =

2020 film

- Directed by: Shahram Mokri
- Screenplay by: Nasim Ahmadpour; Shahram Mokri
- Produced by: Negar Eskandarfar
- Starring: Babak Karimi
- Cinematography: Alireza Barazandeh
- Edited by: Shahram Mokri
- Music by: Ehsan Sedigh
- Release date: 8 September 2020 (Venice Film Festival)
- Language: Persian

Careless Crime (Persian: جنایت بی‌دقت, romanized: Jenayat-e bi deghat) is a 2020 Iranian crime drama film co-written and directed by Shahram Mokri. While it is set in contemporary Iran, it is based on the Cinema Rex fire, perpetrated in 1978 in Abadan by four Islamic extremists.

The film premiered at the 77th edition of the Venice Film Festival, in the Horizons sidebar. It was awarded the Silver Hugo at the Chicago International Film Festival.

== Cast ==
- Babak Karimi as Mohsen
- Razie Mansori as Elham
- Abolfazl Kahani as Takbali
- Mohammad Sareban as Faraj
- Adel Yaraghi as Majid
- Mahmoud Behraznia as Yadollah
- Behzad Dorani as Fallah
