= Invasion (2017 film) =

2017 film

- Film poster
- Directed by: Shahram Mokri
- Written by: Shahram Mokri
- Starring: Babak Karimi; Abed Abest
- Release date: 6 November 2017
- Running time: 90 minutes
- Country: Iran
- Language: Persian

Invasion (Persian: هجوم) is a 2017 Iranian crime film directed by Shahram Mokri. It was screened in the Panorama section at the 68th Berlin International Film Festival.

== Cast ==
- Babak Karimi
- Abed Abest
- Levon Haftvan
- Pedram Sharifi
