= I Didn't See You There =

2022 American documentary film

- Official poster
- Directed by: Reid Davenport
- Produced by: Keith Wilson
- Narrated by: Reid Davenport
- Edited by: Todd Chandler
- Release date: January 2022 (Sundance)
- Running time: 77 minutes
- Country: United States
- Language: English

I Didn't See You There is a 2022 American documentary film directed by Reid Davenport, produced by Keith Wilson, and edited by Todd Chandler. It is shot entirely from Davenport's physical perspective, largely from an electric wheelchair, as he navigates downtown Oakland, California, and his hometown of Bethel, Connecticut.

I Didn't See You There had its world premiere at the 2022 Sundance Film Festival.

== Synopsis ==
The unexpected arrival of a circus tent outside Reid's apartment in Oakland, CA leads him to consider the history and legacy of P.T. Barnum’s Freak Show and its lingering presence in his daily life in the form of gawking, lack of access, and other forms of ableism. The film expands on the tradition of point-of-view cinema by incorporating a disabled aesthetic generated through Davenport's own embodiment.

== Accessibility ==
The film played only in theaters that were wheelchair accessible, and where it could be screened with open or closed captions. The film's detailed captions, created by Cheryl Green, were favorably compared to its "complex, immersive sound design". There is an audio-described version of the film narrated by director Reid Davenport.

== Release and reception ==
The film had its world premiere at the 2022 Sundance Film Festival on January 22, 2022, where it won the Directing Award in the U.S. Documentary category. It also won the Grand Jury Prize at Full Frame Documentary Film Festival, and the GGA McBaine Bay Area Documentary Feature Award at SFFILM, the San Francisco International Film Festival.

It aired on public television as part of Season 35 of POV in January 2023.

I Didn’t See You There received positive reviews from film critics. On Rotten Tomatoes it has a 95% approval rating based on reviews from 20 critics. Nick Allen writing for Roger Ebert states “I Didn’t See You There is first-person poetry in captivating motion, expressed with a singular, assured artistic voice.”
