= Sammi, Who Can Detach His Body Parts =

2025 Indonesian short film

- Directed by: Rein Maychaelson
- Written by: Rein Maychaelson; Corenne Ong
- Produced by: Muhammad Ihsan Ibrahim; Astrid Saerong
- Starring: Jefri Nichol; Nai Djenar Maesa Ayu
- Cinematography: Batara Goempar
- Edited by: Reynaldi Christanto
- Music by: An Tôn Thất
- Production companies: SinemArt; Studio Rumah Kedua
- Release date: 15 February 2025 (Berlinale)
- Running time: 19 minutes
- Country: Indonesia
- Language: Indonesian

Sammi, Who Can Detach His Body Parts is a 2025 Indonesian body horror short film directed by Rein Maychaelson from a screenplay he wrote with Corenne Ong. It stars Jefri Nichol in the title role and Nai Djenar Maesa Ayu.

It had its world premiere at the 75th Berlin International Film Festival on 15 February 2025, competing for the Short Film Golden Bear. It won the Best Live Action Short Film at the 2025 Indonesian Film Festival.

== Premise ==
A mother embarks on a quest to recover the body parts of her dead son, a man who possessed the ability to detach his body parts at will.

== Cast ==
- Jefri Nichol as Sammi
- Nai Djenar Maesa Ayu as Lian, Sami's mother
- Damita Almira as Ester
- Klara Virencia as Dian
- Hatta Rahandy as rapist
- Sugeng Fadillah as Sammi's father
- Abbe Rahman as the morgue staff

== Release ==
Sammi, Who Can Detach His Body Parts had its world premiere at the 75th Berlin International Film Festival on 15 February 2025 at the Berlinale Short Film Competition section, competing for the Short Film Golden Bear. The film had been featured in a number of international film festivals, including Kraków Film Festival, Bucheon International Fantastic Film Festival, and New York Asian Film Festival.

== Accolades ==
Award / Film Festival	Date of ceremony	Category	Recipient(s)	Result	Ref.
Berlin International Film Festival	23 February 2025	Golden Bear for Best Short Film	Rein Maychaelson	Nominated	
Kraków Film Festival	1 June 2025	Golden Dragon – International Short Film	Rein Maychaelson	Nominated	
Kraków Film Festival	1 June 2025	Silver Dragon – International Short Film: Best Short Fiction Film	Rein Maychaelson	Won	
Indonesian Film Festival	20 November 2025	Best Live Action Short Film	Rein Maychaelson, Ihsan Ibrahim, and Astrid Saerong	Won	
Singapore International Film Festival	7 December 2025	Best Southeast Asian Short Film	Rein Maychaelson	Nominated	
Singapore International Film Festival	7 December 2025	Best Cinematography	Batara Goempar	Won	
