= Simulation (film) =

2017 film

- official poster
- Directed by: Abed Abest
- Written by: Abed Abest
- Cinematography: Hamid Khozouie Abyane
- Edited by: Hayedeh Safiyari
- Release dates: February 2017 (Berlin); 6 November 2017
- Running time: 84 minutes
- Country: Iran
- Language: Persian

Simulation (Persian: Tamaroz) is a 2017 Iranian drama film directed by Abed Abest. It was screened in the Forum section at the 67th Berlin International Film Festival. It was also nominated for best film award in Transilvania International Film Festival (2017) and in Ars Independent Festival (2017).
Simulation also won the best film award in Spain Moving Images Festival (2018) and nominated for the best film in discovery section in Toronto International Film Festival (2017).

== Cast ==
- Abed Abest
- Vahid Rad
- Majid Yousefi
- Danial Khojasteh
- Shahrzad Seifi
- Asghar Piran
