= Babak Karimi =

Iranian film editor and actor (born 1960)

- بابک کریمی
- Karimi in 2026
- Born: 22 March 1960 (age 66); Prague, Czech Republic
- Occupations: Actor, editor, director
- Parent: Nosrat Karimi (father)
- Awards: Silver Bear for Best Actor

Babak Karimi (Persian: بابک کریمی; born 1960) is a Czech-Iranian actor and film editor. For his role in A Separation, he won the Silver Bear for Best Actor at the 61st Berlin International Film Festival in 2011.

== Filmography ==
=== Film ===
- Tickets (2005)
- A Separation (2011)
- The Past (2013)
- Fish & Cat (2013)
- 360 Degree (2014)
- The Girl's House (2014)
- The Salesman (2016)
- A Wedding (2016)
- Death of the Fish (2016)
- Invasion (2017)
- The Last Prosecco (2017)
- The Role (2018) (short)
- Yalda, a Night for Forgiveness (2019)
- The Life Ahead (2020)
- No Choice (2020)
- Shahre Gheseh Cinema (2020)
- Careless Crime (2020)
- At the End of Evin (2021)
- Majority (2021)
- Zeros and Ones (2021)
- Until Tomorrow (2022)
- The Loser Man (2022)
- Visiting Time (2022) (short)
- Bucharest (2022)
- The Wastetown (2022)
- Fossil (2023)
- Guardian of the Field (2025)
- Black Rabbit, White Rabbit (2025)

=== Web ===
Year	Title	Role	Director	Platform
2021	I Want to Live	Homayoun Haghi	Sharam Shah Hosseini	Filimo
2021–2022	Once Upon a Time in Iran	Haji Zarabi	Tina Pakravan	Namava
2022	The Lion Skin	Behzad	Jamshid Mahmoudi	Filmnet

=== Television ===
Year	Title	Role	Director	Network
2020	Compass	Nasser Tajali	Sharam Shah Hosseini	IRIB TV1
