= Corner (surname) =

Corner is a surname. Notable people with the surname include:

- Chris Corner (born 1974), British musician
- David Gregor Corner (c.1585–1648), German abbot and hymnologist
- Diane Corner (born 1959), British diplomat, deputy head of United Nations MINUSCA
- E. J. H. Corner (1906–1996), British botanist and mycologist
- Frank Corner (1920–2014), New Zealand diplomat
- George Richard Corner (1801–1863), English antiquary
- George W. Corner (1889–1981), American physician and embryologist
- Greg Corner (born 1974), American musician
- Harry Corner (1874–1938), British cricketer
- James Corner (born 1961), American landscape architect
- Philip Corner (born 1933), American musician and composer
- Reggie Corner (born 1983), American football player

Fictional characters:

- Alejandro Corner, character in the anime series Mobile Suit Gundam 00
- Michael Corner, character in the Harry Potter series
- Corner of the Yard, character in the Two Ronnies' The Phantom Raspberry Blower of Old London Town

== See also ==
- Cornaro family (Corner in Venetian dialect)
