= Death of Gloria Ramirez =

Death of an American cancer patient

Gloria Ramirez
- Born: Gloria Cecilia Ramirez; January 11, 1963; Riverside, California, U.S.
- Died: February 19, 1994 (aged 31); Moreno Valley, California, U.S.
- Cause of death: Cancer due to malignancy
- Known for: Cause of illnesses of multiple hospital workers [23]

Gloria Cecilia Ramirez (January 11, 1963 – February 19, 1994) was an American woman who was dubbed the Toxic Lady or the Toxic Woman by the media when several hospital workers became ill after airborne exposure to her body and blood. Ramirez had been admitted to the emergency room suffering from late-stage cervical cancer. While treating Ramirez, three hospital workers fainted, and others experienced symptoms such as shortness of breath and muscle spasms. Seven workers required hospitalization, one of whom remained in an intensive care unit for two weeks. Ramirez herself died from complications related to her cancer shortly after arriving at the hospital.

The incident was initially considered to be a case of mass hysteria. An investigation by Lawrence Livermore National Laboratory suggested that Ramirez had been self-administering dimethyl sulfoxide (DMSO) as a pain treatment. The oxygen from the mask provided by paramedics during her transport to the hospital likely converted the DMSO into dimethyl sulfate (DMS), a highly toxic and carcinogenic alkylating agent. Although dimethyl sulfate has a very low vapor pressure at body temperature, it is believed to have transitioned to a gaseous state due to the vacuum inside the vacutainer. This theory has been endorsed by the Riverside Coroner's Office and published in the journal Forensic Science International.

== Emergency department visit ==
Prior to arriving at the emergency room, Ramirez's boyfriend Johnnie Estrada called 911 and reported that Ramirez was experiencing nausea and vomiting throughout the entire day. At about 8:15 p.m. on February 19, 1994, Ramirez, suffering from severe heart palpitations, was brought into the emergency room of Riverside General Hospital in Riverside, California, by paramedics. She was extremely confused and was suffering from tachycardia and Cheyne–Stokes respiration. Respiratory therapist Maureen Welch noted that Ramirez's age, even with her diagnosis of cervical cancer, was odd since most patients exhibiting her symptoms were elderly.

Hospital staff administered diazepam (Valium), midazolam (Versed) and lorazepam (Ativan) to sedate Ramirez, and followed up with lidocaine and Bretylium agents to address her abnormal heartrate. When it became clear that she was responding poorly to treatment, Ramirez began to go into shock, and staff tried to defibrillate her heart; at that point several medical workers saw an oily sheen covering Ramirez's body, and some noticed a fruity, garlic-like odor that they thought was coming from her mouth. Registered nurse Susan Kane drew blood from Ramirez's arm and noticed an ammonia-like smell coming from the tube.

Kane passed the tube to Julie Gorchynski, a medical resident, who noticed manila-colored (yellow-brown) crystalized particles floating in the blood. At this point, Kane began feeling a burning sensation on her face and then fainted, after she was removed from the emergency room. Shortly thereafter, Gorchynski began to feel nauseated. Complaining that she was lightheaded, she left the emergency room and sat at a nurse's desk. A staff member asked her if she was okay, but before she could respond, Gorchynski also fainted. Maureen Welch was the third to faint, after noting that the blood drawn smelled less like that from a chemo-patient and more like the ammonia odor the other staff were describing. On awakening, she could not control her limbs. Staff were then ordered to evacuate all emergency room patients to the parking lot outside the hospital while it was declared under an internal emergency. During this time, a skeleton crew stayed behind to stabilize Ramirez. At 8:50 p.m., after 45 minutes of CPR and defibrillation, Ramirez was pronounced dead from kidney failure related to her cancer. Twenty-three people who were in Ramirez's vicinity became ill, and five were hospitalized. The incident itself was around 30 minutes, with Gloria Ramirez's body being isolated in a separate room next to the trauma room, and later bagged and moved into an air-tight container.

== Investigation ==
The Riverside County health specialist department called in California's Department of Health and Human Services, which put two scientists, Drs. Ana Maria Osorio and Kirsten Waller, on the case. They interviewed 34 hospital staff who had been working in the emergency room on February 19. Using a standardized questionnaire, Osorio and Waller found that the people who had developed severe symptoms, such as loss of consciousness, shortness of breath and muscle spasms, tended to have certain things in common. People who had worked within two feet of Ramirez and had handled her intravenous lines had been at high risk. But other factors that correlated with severe symptoms did not appear to match a scenario in which fumes had been released: the survey found that those afflicted tended to be women rather than men, and they all had normal blood tests after the exposure. They believed the hospital workers suffered from an incident of mass hysteria. In total, 27 of the 37 staff members in the emergency room that night reported feeling some type of symptom.

Gorchynski denied that she had been affected by mass hysteria and pointed to her own medical history as evidence. After the exposure, she spent two weeks in the intensive care unit with breathing problems. She developed hepatitis and avascular necrosis in her knees. The Riverside Coroner's Office contacted the Lawrence Livermore National Laboratory to investigate the incident. Livermore postulated that Ramirez had been using dimethyl sulfoxide (DMSO) as a home remedy for pain. Users of this substance report that it has a garlic-like taste. Sold in gel form at hardware stores, topical application to Ramirez's skin could explain the greasy appearance of Ramirez's body. Livermore scientists theorized that the DMSO in Ramirez's system might have built up owing to urinary blockage caused by her kidney failure. Oxygen administered by the paramedics would have combined with the DMSO to form dimethyl sulfone (DMSO_{2}); DMSO_{2} is known to crystallize at room temperature, and crystals were observed in some of Ramirez's drawn blood. Electric shocks administered during emergency defibrillation could have then converted the DMSO_{2} into dimethyl sulfate (DMSO_{4}), the highly toxic dimethyl ester of sulfuric acid, exposure to which could have caused the reported symptoms of the emergency room staff. Livermore scientists postulated on The New Detectives that the change in temperature of the blood drawn, from the 98.6 °F (37 °C) of Ramirez's body to the 64 °F (18 °C) of the emergency room, may have also contributed to a conversion from DMSO_{2} into DMSO_{4}. However, many organic chemists are dismissive of this theory, citing the length of time required for a reaction like this to occur and the fact that the human body is not warm enough for the conversion to happen.

This case was one of the most extensive investigations in medical history, with "medical detectives from ten local, state and federal outfits", examining dozens of potential causes behind the incident. It was suggested that the staff underwent an outbreak of a mass psychogenic illness, which could have been a result of the chemical conversion described above.

== Burial ==
Two months after Ramirez died, her body was released for an independent autopsy and burial. The Riverside Coroner's Office hailed Livermore's DMSO conclusion as the probable cause of the hospital staff's symptoms while her family disagreed. Ramirez's sister, Maggie Ramirez-Garcia, spoke out in April 1994, inquiring into the ten weeks it took for the cause of death to be deemed "natural causes". Ramirez-Garcia furthered this point by arguing that her sister would not have died that night had she not gone into the hospital.

On April 20, 1994—ten weeks after her death—Ramirez was buried at Olivewood Memorial Park in Riverside. Her official cause of death was labeled cardiac dysrhythmia that resulted in kidney failure, all stemming from her cervical cancer. During her funeral, and afterward, her family and Reverend Brian Taylor continued pinning the blame on the poor care of the hospital for Ramirez's death, and maintain that the toxic fumes that resulted in her death along with the hysteria could likely be attributed to the hospital as well.

== Status of technical forensic analysis ==
The possible chemical explanation for this incident, by Patrick M. Grant of the Livermore Forensic Science Center, has appeared in some forensic science textbooks. In one such textbook, Fundamentals of Forensic Science, the authors state that, although the hypothesized conversion of DMSO_{2} to DMSO_{4} has not previously been observed, the postulated scenario is "the most scientific explanation to date" and that "beyond this theory, no credible explanation has ever been offered for the strange case of Gloria Ramirez."

Despite the overwhelming evidence that the scientific processes described therein do not follow conventional chemical mechanisms established in centuries of literature, Grant's conclusions and speculations about the incident were evaluated by professional forensic scientists, chemists, and toxicologists, passed peer review in an accredited, refereed journal, and were published by Forensic Science International.

== In popular culture ==
Buzzfeed Unsolved's The Bizarre Toxic Death of Gloria Ramirez covers the case of Ramirez's death and examines different hypotheses as to what may have caused the incidents that surrounded her death.

The Murdoch Mysteries episode "A Most Surprising Bond" is loosely based on the Ramirez case, using the DMSO hypothesis to explain how a hospital patient's blood is causing those around her to fall ill.

Ramirez's story also played a part in inspiring Stink Bomb, the second segment of the three-part film anthology Memories by Katsuhiro Otomo, where a lab technician accidentally takes an experimental drug and becomes a walking chemical weapon.

Episode 14 of season 3 of Grey's Anatomy, "Wishin and Hopin", features a patient who is based on this case. The cancer patient causes anyone who comes in contact with her to faint and require immediate medical attention due to her taking a herbal supplement, causing her blood to become toxic.

Radiolab also featured this story in their live show titled Viscera, whose recording was partially broadcast on the October 16th 2026 podcast episode titled "The Smell of Hell".

== See also ==
- List of unsolved deaths
- List of unusual deaths in the 20th century
- Mary Mallon
