= Elizabeth Bouvia =

American right-to-die activist (born c. 1958–2014)

- Born: May 19, 1957; Fort Stockton, Texas
- Died: March 29, 2014 (aged 56)
- Occupation: Euthanasia activist

Elizabeth Bouvia (May 19, 1957 – March 29, 2014) was a figure in the American right-to-die movement. Her case attracted nationwide attention in this area as well as in medical ethics.

== History ==
On September 3, 1983, Bouvia, at the age of 26 admitted herself into the psychiatric ward of Riverside General Hospital in Riverside, California. She was almost totally paralysed by cerebral palsy and had severe degenerative arthritis, which caused her great pain.

Bouvia was alienated from her family and husband, and had been entertaining thoughts of suicide. She requested hospital authorities to allow her to starve to death. When they refused and ordered her to be force-fed, Bouvia contacted the American Civil Liberties Union, which assigned her a lawyer. In the subsequent lawsuit, the court upheld the hospital's decision and ordered force-feeding to continue (Pence 64–65).

== Appeal ==
Following the court case, a bitter dispute broke out among physicians regarding the Bouvia case. Bouvia tried to resist the force-feeding by biting through the feeding tube. Four attendants would then hold her down while the tubing was inserted into her nose and liquids pumped into her stomach.

Some physicians called this battery and torture, while others claimed that the hospital was right to err on the side of continued life (Pence 65).

Bouvia appealed the lower court ruling and lost. Now, in addition to the force-feeding, she was hooked up to a morphine drip to ease the pain of her arthritis. In 1986, she appealed again and this time the court ruled in her favor that the force-feeding constituted battery.

== Outcome ==
After the court case, Bouvia decided that she would live. However, her statements made it clear that it was because of the pain of starvation and that she actually wished she was dead.

In 1992, Bouvia's lawyer Richard Scott killed himself. In an interview with the Los Angeles Times after his suicide, Bouvia stated that she had gone on morphine after the original court ruling in 1983. She stated that side effects of the morphine made starvation unbearable and expressed bitterness that the 1983 ruling had gone against her. She stated that she had been strong enough to starve herself to death in 1983 and said that she never would have gone on morphine if she had known she would eventually get a court ruling in her favor.

In 1998, she appeared on 60 Minutes, saying that she was still in pain and had felt great pressure to continue living; she expressed the hope that she would soon die of natural causes. She was still living in 2002. In its obituary for USC professor Harlan Hahn, the Los Angeles Times on May 11, 2008, reported that Bouvia was still alive. Doctors in 1986 had predicted she could only live for another 15 to 20 years.

In the 2025 documentary Life After, director Reid Davenport interviewed Elizabeth's sisters, Teresa and Rebecca Castner, who confirmed that Elizabeth died on March 29, 2014. The last shot of the documentary depicts Davenport editing Bouvia's Wikipedia page to add her date of death.
