= The Corner (2014 film) =

2014 film

- Film poster
- Directed by: Abed Abest
- Written by: Abed Abest
- Starring: Abed Abest
- Cinematography: Abed Abest
- Release date: 18 November 2014 (Cairo)
- Running time: 55 minutes
- Country: Iran
- Language: Persian

The Corner (Persian: Gusheh) is a 2014 Iranian drama film directed by Abed Abest. It was screened at the Cairo International Film Festival.

== Cast ==
- Abed Abest
