= Fish & Cat =

2013 Iranian film

- Film poster
- Directed by: Shahram Mokri
- Written by: Shahram Mokri
- Produced by: Sepehr Seifi; Kanoon Iran Novin
- Starring: Babak Karimi; Saeed Ebrahimifar; Siavash Cheraghipoor; Abed Abest
- Cinematography: Mahmoud Kalari
- Music by: Christophe Rezai
- Distributed by: Filmiran (Iran); Iranian Independents (International)
- Release date: 6 September 2013 (Venice Film Festival)
- Running time: 134 minutes
- Country: Iran
- Language: Persian

Fish & Cat (in Persian : ماهی و گربه; transliterated as Mahi va Gorbeh) is a 2013 mystery drama Iranian film directed by Shahram Mokri about of a group of university students camping at a lakeside for kite-running competitions. The film is notable for being presented in a non-linear single, uncut 135-minute shot. The film was first premiered in the Venice Film Festival on 6 September 2013. The film won the Special Award in 2013 Venice Film Festival and the FIPRESCI award in 2014 Fribourg International Film Festival. In September 2015, Fish & Cat was one of ten shortlisted films for Iran's submission for the Best International Feature Film at the 88th Academy Awards, but ultimately was not selected.

Fish & Cat was inspired by the true story of a restaurant in northern Iran that served human flesh in the late 90s. Iranian actors Babak Karimi and Saeid Ebrahimifar, along with young, unknown theatre artists, appeared in the film.

Many critics found the film innovative and technically impressive. The film was screened in Iran in several cinemas, including Azadi Cinema Complex and Kourosh Complex in Tehran and Howeyzeh cinema complex in Mashhad.

== Plot ==
A number of students have traveled to the Caspian region in order to participate in a kite-flying event during the winter solstice. Next to their camp is a small hut occupied by three cooks who work at a nearby restaurant.

== Cast ==
- Abed Abest as Parviz
- Mona Ahmadi as Nadia
- Ainaz Azarhoush as Parvaneh
- Nazanin Babaei as Shirin
- Mohammad Berahmani as Boy
- Siavash Cheraghipoor as Father
- Saeed Ebrahimifar as Saeed
- Alireza Esapoor as Guard
- Neda Jebraeili as Mina
- Shadi Karamroudi as Maral
- Babak Karimi as Babak
- Mohammad Reza Maleki as Jamshid
- Faraz Modiri as Kambiz
- Milad Rahimi as Shahrooz
- Arnavaz Safari as Asal
- Nima Shahrabi as Twin
- Pouya Shahrabi as Twin
- Khosrow Shahraz as Hamid
- Pedram Sharifi as Pedram
- Parinaz Tayyeb as Maryam
- Samaneh Vafaiezadeh as Ladan

== Production ==
Shahram Mokri said "I like the paintings of Maurits Escher, where you can see a change in perspective in the same visual. In my film, I wanted to give a change in perspective of time in one single shot. So the idea for the film came from his paintings.

Mokri added "Fish & Cat is a film about time. How you can make a perspective in it and break that. This film was interesting for me to make and that was because of its method of production. Insisting on narrating a story in a single shot and try to break the time which goes ahead."

=== Music ===
Mokri wanted a kind of music that combined minimal music with the music of horror Z-movies, so he asked Kristoph Rezaee to score the film.

== Critical reception ==
Manohla Dargis from The New York Times wrote: " It's a tour de force — the cinematographer is Mahmoud Kalari, who shot A Separation — and as quietly political as it is brazenly cinematic."

Steve MacFarlane from Slant Magazine wrote: "The film is a game: Shahram Mokri challenges his viewers to grip parallel narrative threads in what feels like suspiciously real time, rather than to assemble or contextualize any metaphorical ones."

Alissa Simon from Variety wrote: "“A highly original, compelling feature, filmed in one long, bravura shot establishing Shahram Mokri as a distinctive talent.”

== Awards ==
- Dubai International Film Festival 2013 - Muhr AsiaAfrica Special Jury Prize
- Fribourg International Film Festival 2014 - FIPRESCI Prize and Youth Jury Award
- Venice Film Festival 2013 - Venice Horizons Award - Special Prize
- 13th Lisbon International Film Festival - Best Film award
- 13th If Istanbul Independent Film Festival - Best Film Award
