= Reid Davenport =

American filmmaker

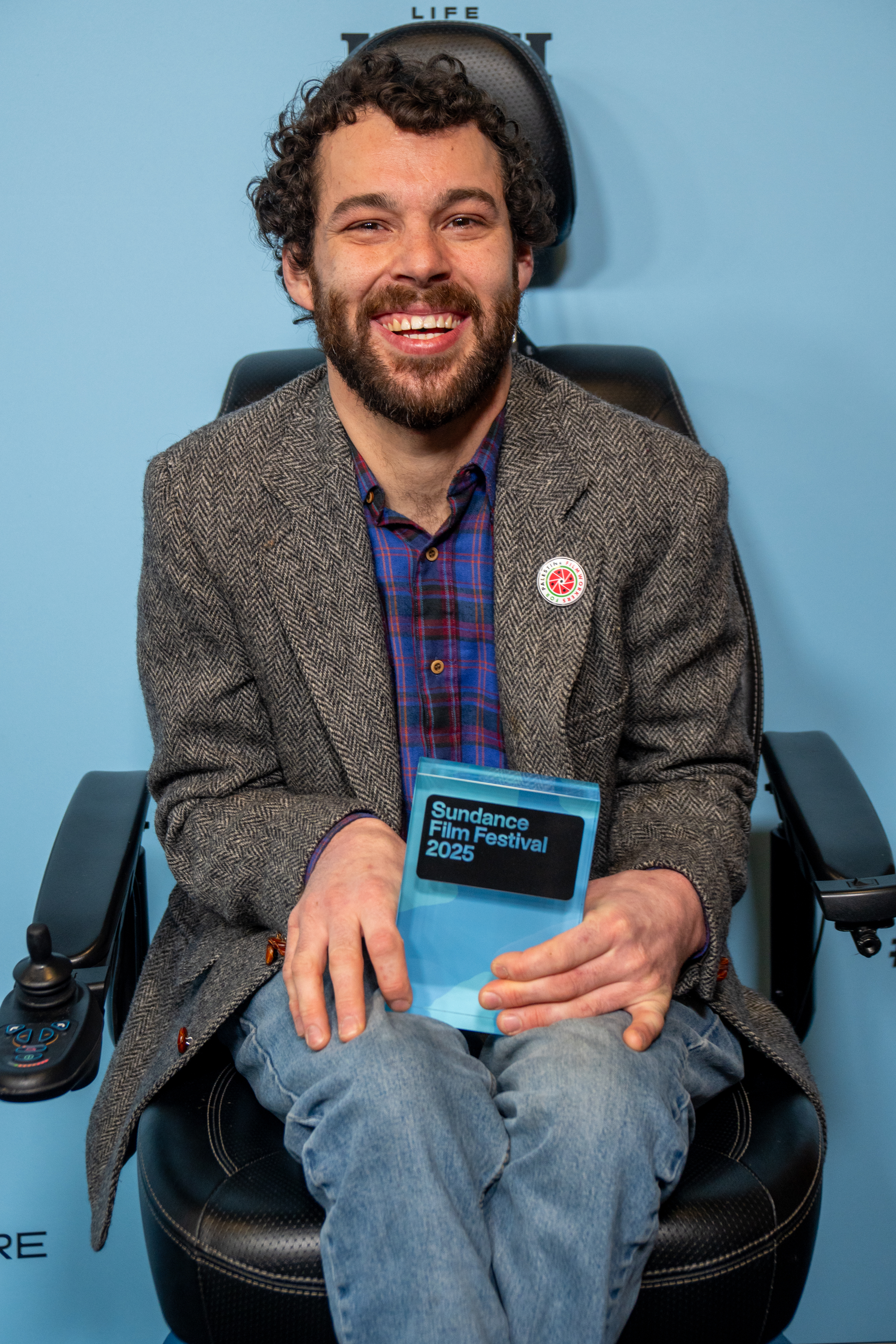
- Reid Davenport at the 2025 Sundance Film Festival
- Education: George Washington University (BA); Stanford University (MFA)
- Occupation: film director
- Awards: Guggenheim Fellow (2026)
- Website: www.reiddavenport.com

Reid Davenport is an American filmmaker. He won the Sundance Film Festival's U.S. Documentary Directing Award in 2022 for his film, I Didn't See You There.

== Early life and education ==
Davenport grew up in Bethel, Connecticut. He has a BA in Journalism and Mass Communication from The George Washington University and an MFA in documentary film from Stanford University.

Davenport has cerebral palsy and uses a wheelchair.

== Career ==
Davenport's 2022 film I Didn't See You There was shot in his perspective from his electric wheelchair. For it he received the 2022 U.S. Documentary Directing Award at the Sundance Film Festival.

In 2025, Davenport directed the film Life After about Elizabeth Bouvia.

In April 2026, Davenport was awarded the 2026 Guggenheim Fellowship in Film-Video.

== Filmography ==
- Wheelchair Diaries: One Step Up (2013)
- A Cerebral Game (2015)
- I Didn't See You There (2022)
- Life After (2025)
