= Mad Bills to Pay (or Destiny, dile que no soy malo) =

2025 American drama film

- Theatrical release poster
- Directed by: Joel Alfonso Vargas
- Written by: Joel Alfonso Vargas
- Produced by: Paolo Maria Pedullà
- Starring: Juan Collado; Destiny Checho; Yohanna Florentino; Nathaly Navarro
- Cinematography: Rufai Ajala
- Edited by: Irfan Van Tuijl
- Music by: Niklas Sandahl
- Production companies: Killer Films; Perpetuum Films; Watermark Media; Spark Features
- Distributed by: Oscilloscope Laboratories
- Release dates: January 26, 2025 (Sundance); April 17, 2026 (United States)
- Running time: 101 minutes
- Country: United States
- Languages: English; Spanish
- Box office: $67,909

Mad Bills to Pay (or Destiny, dile que no soy malo) is a 2025 American drama film written and directed by Joel Alfonso Vargas, in his directorial debut. It stars Juan Collado, Destiny Checho, Yohanna Florentino and Nathaly Navarro.

It had its world premiere at the 2025 Sundance Film Festival on January 26, 2025. It was released on April 17, 2026, by Oscilloscope Laboratories.

== Premise ==
Rico spends his summer selling homemade cocktails on Orchard Beach. When his girlfriend, Destiny, becomes pregnant, she moves in with his family.

== Cast ==
- Juan Collado as Rico
- Destiny Checho as Destiny
- Yohanna Florentino as Andrea
- Nathaly Navarro as Sally

== Production ==
Principal photography took place over the course of 16 days in The Bronx.

The film's title is a reference to The Notorious B.I.G.'s song "Everyday Struggle", which also addresses the financial challenges associated with impending fatherhood.

== Release ==
The film premiered at the 2025 Sundance Film Festival on January 26, 2025, where it won the NEXT Special Jury Award for Ensemble Cast. It also screened at the 75th Berlin International Film Festival in February 2025. The film had its New York premiere on April 4, 2025 at the Lincoln Center and screened at the Museum of Modern Art the following day as part of the New Directors/New Films Festival. It also made it to the Meeting Point slate of the 70th Valladolid International Film Festival. In September 2025, Oscilloscope acquired distribution rights to the film. The film was also screened in competition at the 20th Rome Film Festival. It was also screened at the 69th BFI London Film Festival in the First Feature Competition, the American Independents section of the 36th Stockholm International Film Festival, the 26th Fargo Film Festival, and the 12th Manchester Film Festival. It was released on April 17, 2026.

== Reception ==
=== Critical response ===
On the review aggregator website Rotten Tomatoes, 92% of 24 critics' reviews are positive, with an average rating of 7.10/10. Metacritic, which uses a weighted average, assigned the film a score of 80 out of 100, based on seven critics, indicating "generally favorable" reviews.

=== Accolades ===
Award	Date of ceremony	Category	Nominee(s)	Result	Ref.
BFI London Film Festival	October 19, 2025	First Feature Competition	Mad Bills to Pay (or Destiny, dile que no soy malo)	Nominated	
Fargo Film Festival	March 21, 2026	Honorable Mention for Best Narrative Feature	Mad Bills to Pay (or Destiny, dile que no soy malo)	Won	
Gotham Independent Film Awards	November 30, 2026	Breakthrough Director	Joel Alfonso Vargas	Pending	
