= Human Resource (film) =

2025 drama film

- Theatrical release poster
- Thai: พนักงานใหม่ (โปรดรับไว้พิจารณา)
- Directed by: Nawapol Thamrongrattanarit
- Written by: Nawapol Thamrongrattanarit
- Produced by: Nawapol Thamrongrattanarit; Pacharin Surawatanapongs
- Starring: Prapamonton Eiamchan
- Cinematography: Natdanai Naksuwarn
- Edited by: Manussa Vorasingha; Sukphansinee Sompenkul
- Music by: Mellow Tunes; Siwat Homkham
- Production companies: Happy Ending Film; Jai Studios; Bangkok CityCity Gallery
- Distributed by: GDH 559
- Release dates: 3 September 2025 (Venice); 29 January 2026 (Thailand)
- Running time: 122 minutes
- Country: Thailand
- Language: Thai

Human Resource (Thai: พนักงานใหม่ (โปรดรับไว้พิจารณา), romanized: Phanakngan Mai (Prod Rap Wai Phicharana), lit. 'New employee (please take into consideration)') is a 2025 Thai drama film written, produced and directed by Nawapol Thamrongrattanarit. It stars Prapamonton Eiamchan, Paopetch Charoensook, Pimmada Chaisakaoen and Chanakan Rattana-Udom.

The film had its world premiere in the Orizzonti section at the 82nd Venice International Film Festival on 27 August 2025, where it won the Fondazione Fai Prize. It was theatrically released in Thailand by GDH 559 on 29 January 2026.

== Plot ==
Working in HR at a challenging company, Fren interviews young new hires and is secretly one month pregnant, grappling with the decision to have a child in difficult circumstances.

== Cast ==
- Prapamonton Eiamchan as Fren
- Paopetch Charoensook as Thame
- Pimmada Chaisakaoen as Jida
- Chanakan Rattana-Udom as Tenn

== Production ==
Thamrongrattanarit got inspiration for the script from his fascination for the human resources sector combined with his own introspective questions about parenthood. The film was produced by Happy Ending Film.

== Release ==
The film had its world premiere at the 82nd Venice International Film Festival, in the Orizzonti sidebar, where it won the Fondazione Fai Prize. It was later screened in other festivals, including the BFI London Film Festival, the 30th Busan International Film Festival, the Taipei Golden Horse Film Festival, the Zurich Film Festival and the 36th Singapore International Film Festival.

The film was screened in the Thai Visions, section of the 25th New York Asian Film Festival on 21 July 2026 for its New York Premiere.

== Reception ==
The film was well-received by critics. Marc van de Klashorst from International Cinephile Society gave the film 4 stars out of 5, and wrote it "has enough impact to stand tall as a portrait of modern Thailand, a side of the country we don’t often get to see in cinema. Nawapol Thamrongrattanarit guides the film with a firm hand and clear vision, letting the drama efficiently play out in subdued tones and relying on his two central actors to convey the emotions while barely showing them." Screen International's film critic Jonathan Romney also praised the film, describing it as an "insightful and intimate beneath its chilly, stylised surface", and highlighting the work of cinematographer Natdanai Naksuwarn, who "draws touches of strange visual poetry from the cityscape".

Mia Pflüger from Next Best Picture called the film "extraordinary" for building "existential dread not through melodrama, but through form", through a "glacial" pacing and an "unyielding rhythm that makes the experience so piercing." South China Morning Post critic James Mottram described the film as a "bleak meditation on corporate culture" that "gives pause for thought".

For this film, Thamrongrattanarit got a nomination for best screenplay at the 18th Asia Pacific Screen Awards.
