= Rashid, the Boy from Sinjar =

2025 documentary film by Jasna Krajinovic

- Directed by: Jasna Krajinovic
- Written by: Jasna Krajinovic
- Produced by: Julie Esparbes
- Cinematography: Eve Duchemin, Kinan Massarani, Julien Gidoin
- Edited by: Marie-Hélène Mora, Julien Contreau
- Production companies: Alter Ego Production; Clin d'œil
- Distributed by: ANDANA FILMS
- Release date: April 6, 2025 (Visions du Réel)
- Running time: 80 minutes
- Countries: Belgium, France
- Language: Kurdish

Rashid, the Boy from Sinjar is a 2025 Belgian-French Documentary Film by Jasna Krajinovic, a Slovenian-born filmmaker who has lived and worked in Belgium since 1999. The film premiered in 2025 at the Visions du Réel and was screened in Germany in May 2025 at the Munich International Documentary Film Festival. It is scheduled for screening in June 2025 Bologna at the Biografilm film festival.

== Plot ==
Beginning in 2020, the filmmakers follow several years in the life of a young Yazidis named Rashid, who was kidnapped by members of the Islamic State (IS) in 2014. Along with other members of his immediate family he was taken from his hometown of Sinjar in Iraq to a prison in Syria until his father was able to locate them and arrange for their release.

In the opening scene Rashid's grandmother narrates the creation story of the world while a film camera captures the images of the a city reduced to rubble. This introduction includes the rhetorical question of why the Yazidis are subject again and again to genocides, a question which overshadows the film's narrative until the end.

Sitting at home in 2020, Rashid, a teenager in the grips of puberty (though his exact age is not given), begins to tell the filmmakers about the years spent in captivity by drawing the house of his grandparents with whom he and his family had been living prior to the IS invasion. His grandfather, whom Rashid had been very close to, was one of the first to be killed at the beginning of the Yazidi genocide on 3. August 2014. Rashid, his four siblings, his mother and stepmother were captured by members of the ISIS and bussed to Syria, where they were kept in an underground prison, often enduring threats and beatings. He displays a photograph of the family which the ISIS posted on Facebook, a method used to sell captive families. His youngest sister, three-year-old Raishin, was taken away from her mother in captivity. Throughout the film her loss is constantly mourned, but they never stop hoping for her return. Some years later, the family received a ransom request which turned out to be an attempt at extortion, a false lead.

The film follows the daily routines of Rashid and his family at home and at work in their bakery in Sinjar. The grandmother recalls their happier past lives and shows family photographs. When Rashid's mother plans to enroll him and his sister in school again—he had attended primary school before being abducted—they are visited by a school representative who tests their knowledge of Kurdisch and Arabic. Rashid mixes the languages together and is reluctant to read aloud. Despite his mother's plans for his schooling, Rashid considers seeking work at a bakery in the city of Sulaymaniyah although his family does not want him to leave home. During a phone call with an uncle who had emigrated to Canada over two years earlier, Rashid learns of the hurdles involved if he were to leave Iraq.

With a group of friends his own age, Rashid walks through the streets of Sinjar, talking about where they used to live and taking photos of their former homes. They warn each other to observe the markings and avoid the mines. In the evening they look up at the night sky and talk about the constellations and whether to stay or leave Sinjar. Despite the appearance of living in a normal community—they wear the same clothes and talk the same way that teenagers do all over the world—and their wish to live at peace in their homeland, the young people know that their circumstances are still precarious. As a minority greatly outnumbered by Muslims and subject to attacks by Turkish drones, the Yazidis do not feel safe in Sinjar. On the day of remembrance marking the beginning of the genocide, the community gathers together with candles and family photos to commemorate and mourn their dead and missing family members. Rashid gives an interview to the press about his hopes and dreams for a safer future.

Rashid recounts going to Mosul one year earlier to get a new passport. There he was suddenly confronted on the street by a man who greeted him by name. It was one of the IS jailers from their years of captivity. The man disappears quickly, but Rashid is shaken by this experience and changes his mind about wanting to stay in Iraq.

In the course of the year, Rashid's mother enters a program for the former captives of IS that will arrange for her to emigrate to Australia with her children. Rashid's father, stepmother and half-sister, as well as his grandmother, remain in Sinjar. The film closes with an emotional scene of the five of them taking their leave from family, neighbors and friends and driving to the airport.

In the closing notes of the film, the viewer learns that Raishin, who would now be a teenager, is one of 2763 hostages who have still not been returned, and that the 18-year-old Rashid is one of 300,000 Yazidis who have emigrated from Iraq since 2014.

At the 2025 Munich International Documentary Film Festival the film won the prize DOK.horizonte – Cinema of Urgency as well as the DOK.fest Preis der SOS-Kinderdörfer weltweit.
