= Our Land (2025 film) =

Documentary film directed by Lucrecia Martel

- Spanish: Nuestra Tierra
- Directed by: Lucrecia Martel
- Written by: María Alché; Lucrecia Martel
- Produced by: Benjamin Domenech; Joslyn Barnes; Santiago Gallelli; Matías Roveda
- Cinematography: Ernesto De Carvalho
- Edited by: Jerónimo Pérez Rioja; Miguel Schverdfinger
- Music by: Alfonso Olguín
- Production companies: Rei Cine; Rei Pictures; Louverture Films; Piano; Snowglobe Films
- Distributed by: Moving Pics (Argentina); Strand Releasing (United States)
- Release dates: 31 August 2025 (Venice); 5 March 2026 (Argentina)
- Running time: 124 minutes
- Countries: Argentina; United States; Mexico; France; Netherlands; Denmark
- Language: Spanish

Our Land (Spanish: Nuestra Tierra) is a 2025 documentary film directed by Lucrecia Martel, it follows the murder of indigenous leader Javier Chocobar and the legacy of colonialism on Latin America.

The film had its world premiere out of competition in the 82nd Venice International Film Festival on 31 August 2025. At the 2025 BFI London Film Festival, it won the Best Film prize. It received critical acclaim for the exploration of post-colonial themes in Argentina.

It was released theatrically in Argentina on 5 March 2026.

== Premise ==
Nuestra Tierra examines issues of land ownership in Argentina and interrogates the role of this history in the murder of Javier Chocobar, a Chuschagasta leader in the struggle for indigenous land rights.

== Production ==
Martel followed the case surrounding the 2009 murder of Javier Chocobar beginning in 2010 and attended the trial of Chocobar's murderer. In 2018, her documentary project about the case was awarded a grant through a joint program of the Sundance Documentary Film Program and the Institute of Contemporary Arts. Nuestra Tierra was also supported with a Pardo prize in the Films After Tomorrow section of the 2020 Locarno Film Festival, which highlighted unfinished productions that were affected by the COVID-19 pandemic.

== Release ==
The documentary had its world premiere out of competition in the 82nd Venice International Film Festival. It will also screen at the 2025 New York Film Festival, and in competition at the 69th BFI London Film Festival. Distributed by Moving Pics, it was released theatrically in Argentina on 5 March 2026.

== Reception ==
On review aggregator website Rotten Tomatoes, the film holds an approval rating of 98% based on 42 reviews, with an average rating of 7.8/10. The website's critical consensus states: "A documentary departure for director Lucrecia Martel that fits in seamlessly with the themes of her fiction films, Our Land captures the dignity and perseverance of an Indigenous community with sharp insight. Metacritic, which uses a weighted average, assigned the film a score of 86 out of 100, based on 16 critics, indicating "universal acclaim".
