= Always (2025 film) =

2025 American-Chinese documentary film

- Official Poster
- Chinese: 从来
- Directed by: Deming Chen
- Produced by: Hansen Lin
- Cinematography: Deming Chen
- Edited by: I-Chu Lin
- Release date: 25 March 2025 (CPH:DOX)
- Running time: 1 hr 28 mins
- Countries: United States; China
- Languages: Chinese; Mandarin; English

Always (Chinese: 从来) is a feature-length documentary directed and shot by Deming Chen, produced by Hansen Lin following the journey of Gong Youbin, a rural adolescent poet in Hunan, China. A poetic coming-of-age film, it had its world premiere at CPH:DOX and received critical acclaim for its meditative visuals and narrative.

== Summary ==
Eight-year-old Gong Youbin lives with his father and grandparents in rural Hunan; his mother left when he was just three months. Life is simple, yet at school, Gong and his classmates discover profundity in poetry as a means of expression. The verses woven throughout the film offer a glimpse into the delicate inner world of a new generation. Surrounded by tranquil landscapes, Gong begins to feel the subtle, inevitable changes of adolescence, where some things must be left behind.

== Production ==
Always was developed as a co-production between the United States, France, China and Taiwan. The film received development support from several documentary labs, including Docs by the Sea. It also received funding support from IDA, BIP TV, the Docs up fund granted during dok.incubator Workshop, CNC and DMZ Rough Cut Pitch.

Director Chen began filming Always in 2018 when Youbin was 8 years old, and continued documenting his life until 2024. The seven-year production timeline allowed Chen and his team to capture Gong's gradual transition from childhood to adolescence.

Producer Lin shielded the team from harsh industry feedback, allowing them to stay focused on creation. During the 2024 dok.incubator workshop, they invited Taiwanese editor I-Chu Lin to join. Director Chen described the collaboration as rewarding, noting that good teamwork comes from listening, experimenting, and letting results speak rather than imposing one's own logic.

== Release ==
Always had its world premiere at the CPH:DOX on 15 March 2025, where it competed in the DOX:Award International Competition and was awarded the top prize. In April 2025, it made its North America premiere at Hot Docs Canadian International Documentary Festival in Toronto. The following month is screened screened in Spain at DocsBarcelona, where it received the AMMAC Montage Award, and also the Jeonju International Film Festival in South Korea, where it won Best Picture Prize in the International Competition. In June 2025, the film had its Australian premiere at Sydney Film Festival.

On 18 August 2025, Always was announced as part of the Best Documentary Feature Film lineup at the 21st Camden International Film Festival, where it will have U.S. premiere. On 3 September 2025, it was selected to screen in the Documentary Competition at BFI London Film Festival.

== Reception ==
The DOX:Award jury at CPH:DOX awarded Always for being "an exquisitely shot chronicle of a rural farming family alive with compassion and poetry", highlighting the film's delicate attention to the unnoticed small moments that make up life. The jury emphasized that the film exemplifies how artists can reveal "the greatness of the little things", praising its sensibility and visual lyricism.

=== Critical reviews ===
Murtada Elfadl of Variety described Always as a "confident and striking debut" that establishes Deming Chen as an exciting new voice in documentary filmmaking. Elfadl praised the film's poetic visual language, noting how Chen's cinematography transforms rural China into a meditative portrait of childhood, family and perseverance.

Wendy Ide of Screen Daily praised the film as a "poetic meditation on growing up in rural China", highlighting its "striking cinematography" and "immersive sound design". She noted that Deming Chen's lyrical approach "elevates a coming-of-age story into a visual and emotional reflection on childhood and loss".

=== Awards ===
Date	Award	Category	Recipient(s)	Result	Ref.
2025	CPH:DOX	DOX:AWARD	Always	Won	
2025	Jeonju International Film Festival	International Competition	Always	Won	
2025	DocsBarcelona	DocsBarcelona TV3 Award	Always	Nominated	
2025	DocsBarcelona	Docs Editing Award	I-Chu Lin	Won	
2025	DokuFest	International Competition	Always	Nominated	
2025	Camden International Film Festival	International Competition	Always	Nominated	
2025	Camden International Film Festival	Harrell Award	Always	Won	
2025	London Film Festival	Documentary Film	Always	Nominated	
2025	Singapore International Film Festival	Best Asian Feature Film	Always	Won	
2025	Asia Pacific Screen Awards	Special Mention for Best Documentary	Always	Won	
2025	El Gouna Film Festival	Golden Star For Best Documentary	Always	Won	
2025	El Gouna Film Festival	FIPRESCI & NETPAC Award	Always	Won	
