= George Richard Corner =

English antiquarian

George Richard Corner FSA (1801–1863) was a 19th-century English antiquarian. He published many articles on the history of Southwark, across several journals, and two books on the borough.

== Early life and education ==
George Richard Corner was born in 1801, in the parish of Christ Church, Southwark, London, to the local solicitor Richard Corner (d. 1820) and his wife, Maria (née Brierley). He was the eldest of six children, four sons and two daughters; all four of Richard's sons followed their father in taking up law. One of his brothers, Arthur Bloxam Corner (1803–1861), later became the Queen's Coroner and attorney in the Queen's Bench, and another, Richard James Corner (1805–1876), was the chief justice of Gold Coast and British Honduras. At the age of 19, his father died, an event which precipitated "many difficulties", according to Corner's obituary in The Gentleman's Magazine. He was educated at Gordon House, in Kentish Town, and was admitted as an attorney in 1824.

== Career ==
Corner first became a solicitor, following his in father's footsteps, a profession which he pursued "with success", according to the Dictionary of National Biography's Warwick William Wroth. In around 1835, he was made the vestry clerk of the Southwark parish of St. Olave, where he was very active, especially in the 1832 cholera epidemic; "regardless of his own safety, he visited the poor sufferers, and assisted in removing them to the hospitals", according to The Gentleman's Magazine. Here, he took some part in the borough's politics, becoming a Liberal politician, though not holding any "party bitterness" against his political opponents. He collaborated with D. W. Harvey, John Day, and the Southwark Reform Association, to argue for Southwark's admission into the City of London Corporation, releasing a pamphlet in 1836 to argue for such a policy. This movement gained some traction, inspiring a separate group of homeowners to take a petition to the borough council, but this petition was eventually rejected by the council.

Corner was elected a Fellow of the Society of Antiquaries on 28 November 1833, and from that point onwards, he published several archeological and antiquarian papers, often concerning Southwark's history. The first of these communications, on 9 January 1834, was to the society's journal, Archaeologia, concerning the discovery of some Roman antiquities in Southwark St Olave, and tangentially clarifying the conflation of the three manors of Southwark, which had previously not been understood by local historians. He continued to contribute to this journal until 1860. In the Society's obituary of Corner, five of his "principal" papers were listed, including one "not yet in type", to be published in the 39th volume of their Proceedings.

Corner was also a member of and contributor to several other antiquarian societies. Corner was a member of Numismatic Society of London and British Archaeological Association, upon their foundings, in 1836 and 1843 respectively. Though Corner didn't have much interest in numismatics, and left the Numismatic Society ten years later, he became a keen member of the British Archaeological Association. He exhibited several archeological finds to the association, and published papers on them in the association journal. Corner also showed a strong interest in the nearby Surrey Archaeological Society.

Corner contributed to several other antiquarian journals, including: the Proceedings of the Surrey Archaeological Society, the Sussex Archaeological Collections, the South London Journal, The Gentleman's Magazine, and the Collectanea Topographica et Genealogica. He published two works: A Concise Account of the Local Government of the Borough of Southwark (Southwark: 1836) and The Rental of St. Olave and St. John (Southwark: 1838; 2 ed., 1851).

== Personal life and death ==
Corner married Sarah Leach, the youngest daughter of Timothy Leach of Clapham, in 1828. Four of their children lived to survive Corner: two daughters and two sons. Corner was a close friend of Charles Roach Smith, who reminisced in a "tribute of esteem to one of my oldest antiquarian friends" about his introduction to Corner over excavations at Keston.

George Richard Corner died on 31 October 1863 at Queens Row, Camberwell, at the age of 62, a sudden death according to his death notice. He was buried in Nunhead Cemetery. Obituaries were published in the Gentleman's Magazine and Proceedings of the Society of Antiquaries. Smith memorialised Corner in the sixth volume of his Collectanea Antiqua, published 1868.
