= Life After (film) =

2025 documentary about the right-to-die movement

- Film poster
- Directed by: Reid Davenport
- Produced by: Colleen Cassingham
- Cinematography: Amber Fares
- Edited by: Don Bernier
- Music by: Robert Aiki Aubrey Lowe
- Production companies: Multitude Films; Straw House Productions; Sundance Institute
- Release dates: January 27, 2025 (Sundance); July 18, 2025
- Running time: 99 minutes
- Country: United States
- Language: English

Life After is a 2025 American documentary film that explores the story of Elizabeth Bouvia, who in 1983 sought the legal right to die. It was directed by Reid Davenport. It premiered at the 2025 Sundance Film Festival, and was given a limited theatrical release on July 18, 2025.

== Reception ==
On the review aggregator website Rotten Tomatoes, 97% of 32 critics' reviews are positive, with an average rating of 8.2/10. The website's consensus reads: "Life After stands as a measured yet incendiary work which channels personal insight and journalistic precision to ask urgent, unsettling questions regarding the societal and institutional structures that impact those with disabilities." Metacritic, which uses a weighted average, assigned the film a score of 84 out of 100, based on six critics, indicating "universal acclaim".

Murtada Elfadl of Variety wrote, "Elizabeth Bouvia's story becomes the sharp framework used by Davenport for his fervent and generous rallying cry for people with disabilities to be in control of their lives." Esther Zuckerman of IndieWire gave the film an A− and wrote, "Davenport is solely focused on the topic of assisted suicide as it relates to disability. He is not interested in diving into how it applies to terminal illness at all. For anyone who argues that makes Life After one-sided, Davenport's own voice provides a furious counterpart to that." Matt Zoller Seitz of RogerEbert.com gave the film three out of four stars and wrote that it's "a powerful movie that examines the political and social structures that surround and control people with disabilities, and comes to a conclusion that will spark many arguments."
