= Shahram Mokri =

Iranian filmmaker (born 1978)

- شهرام مُکری
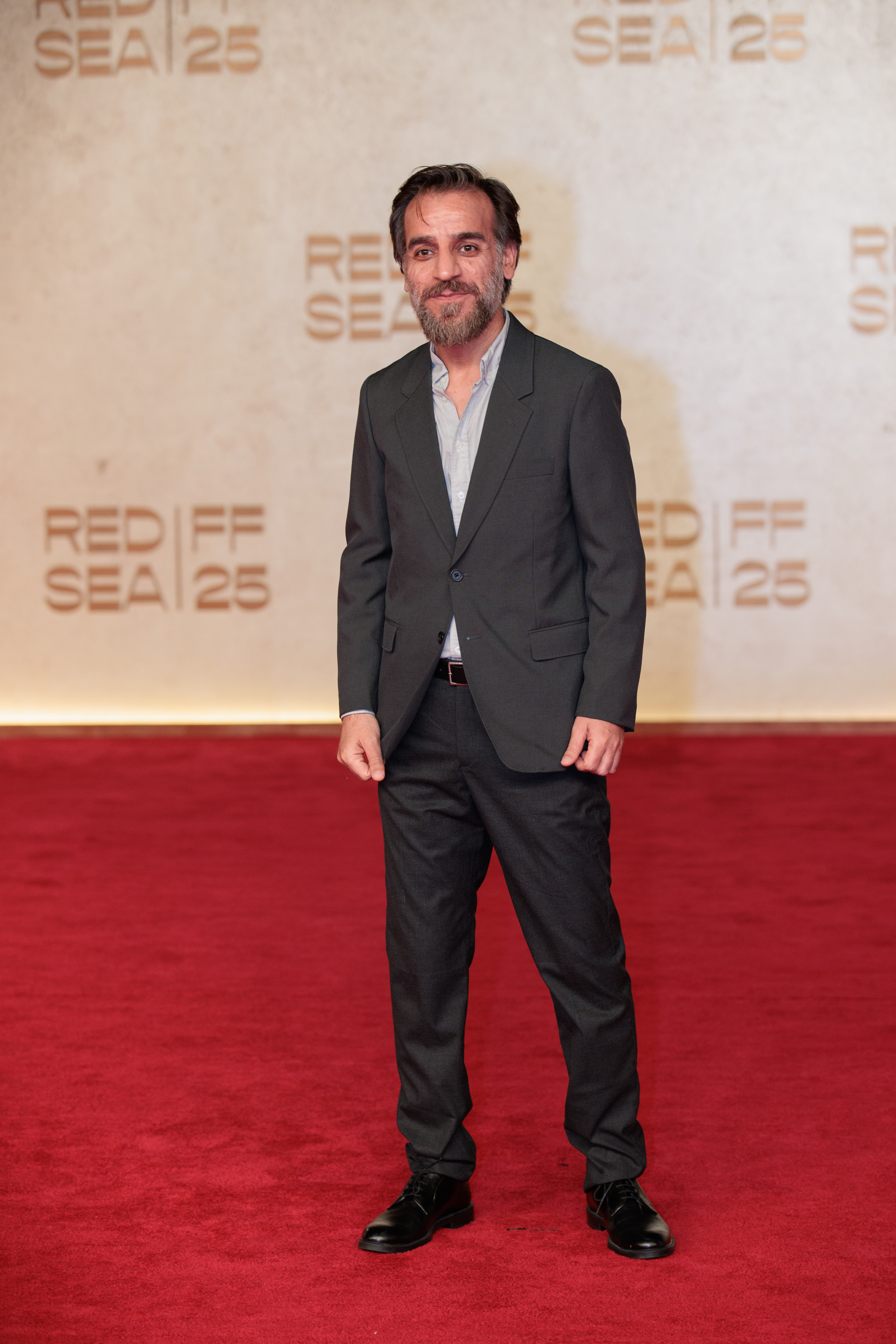
- Mokri in 2014
- Born: August 17, 1978 (age 48); Kermanshah, Iran
- Education: Soore University
- Occupations: Film director; screenwriter; editor
- Years active: 2000-present
- Spouse: Nasim Ahmadpour

Shahram Mokri (Persian: شهرام مکری, born on 17 August, 1978 ) is an Iranian filmmaker. He graduated from Soore University. Mokri started his filmmaking training in the Iranian Youth Cinema Society and entered the professional world of cinema with his short film "Dragonfly Storm" (2002).

== Career ==
Mokri received three Crystal Simorghs from the Fajr Film Festival for short films. He holds the record for receiving Crystal Simorghs in this category. In addition to filmmaking, Shahram Mokri has worked as a film Teacher at the Sooreh University of Tehran, the University of Arts, as well as Karnameh Film School, and the Bamdad Film School. Mokri won the Venice Film Festival's Horizons Award in 2013 for "Creative Content" for his film Fish and Cat.Venice International Film Festival also won a silver Hugo medal at the Chicago Film Festival in the main section for Careless Crime. and the Venice Critics' Best Screenplay Award for the same film is among his other awards. Shahram Mokri is a founding member of the ISFA Cinema House Short Film Association. He has also served on the association's board of directors for three terms. In 2003, he was selected as the best young man in the country in the field of art by the National Youth Organization. He was nominated for the 2013 Asia Pacific Screen Award for Achievement in Directing for Fish & Cat. For his short film The Dragonfly Storm, Mokri won Best Director at the 2007 Noor Iranian Film Festival.

== Filmography ==
Year	Title	Director	Screenwriter	Notes
2000	Electric Shock And Fly	Yes	Yes	Short Film
2002	The Dragonfly Storm	Yes	Yes	Short Film
2005	Limit of A Circle	Yes	Yes	Short Film
2007	Ando-C	Yes	Yes	Short Film
2009	Ashkan, the Sacred Ring and Other Stories	Yes	Yes	
2010	Raw, Cooked and Burnt	Yes	Yes	Short Film
2013	Fish & Cat	Yes	Yes	
2017	Invasion	Yes	Yes	
2020	Careless Crime	Yes	Yes	
2025	Black Rabbit, White Rabbit	Yes	Yes	World premiere at the Busan Film Festival

== Awards ==
Winner of Crystal Simorgh Best Short Film Limited of a circle 25th Fajr International Film Festival (International Competition).

Winner of Crystal Simorgh Best Short Film The Dragonfly Storm 22nd Fajr International Film Festival (Iran Competition).

Winner of Crystal Simorgh Best Short Film The Dragonfly Storm of the 22nd Fajr International Film Festival (International Competition).

Winner of the Cinema House Festival statuette for the short film Ando-C.

Winner of the Cinema House Festival statuette for the film Limited of a circle.

Winner of the Unica Silver Medal from Germany (World Amateur Filmmakers) for the film Dragonfly Storm.

Winner of the Best Experimental Film Award at the Tehran International Short Film Festival for The Dragonfly Storm.

Winner of the best experimental film in the international section of the Tehran International Short Film Festival for The Dragonfly Storm.

Winner of the Best Audience Film Award at the Tehran International Short Film Festival for the film The Dragonfly Storm.

Winner of the award for the best experimental film in the international section of the Tehran International Short Film Festival for the film Limited of a circle [10].

Winner of the Best Experimental Film Award in the International Section of the Tehran International Short Film Festival for Ando-C.

Winner of the Best Audience Film Award at the Tehran International Short Film Festival for Ando-C.

Winner of the Best Experimental Film Award in the International Section of the Tehran International Short Film Festival for Raw, Cooked, Burnt.

Winner of the Obenze Festival bronze medal for the film The Dragonfly Storm.

Winner of Best Short Film, Kish Film Festival The Dragonfly Storm.

Winner of the Best Short Film Award at the Tajik Film Festival for Limited of a circle.

Winner of the Special Jury Prize at the Sony Short Film Festival for The Dragonfly Storm.

Winner of the Golden Cheetah Award for Raw, cooked, Burnt Film at the Tashkent International Film Festival.

Winner of the Kazakhstan Film Academy Award for the raw, cooked, burnt.

Winner of a plaque for directing Ashkan, The Charmed Ring, and other stories from the Fajr Film Festival.

Winner of a special jury award from the Festival of Critics and Writers of Iranian Cinema for the film Ashkan, the Charmed Ring, and other stories.

Winner of the Horizon Award for Innovative Theme, 2013 Venice Film Festival for Fish & Cat.

Winner of the Best Film Award at the Lisbon Film Festival for Fish & Cat [14].

Winner of the Special Jury Prize for the film Fish & Cat from the Dubai Fethlam Festival.

Winner of the Pfeiffer Prize at the Freiburg Film Festival for the film Fish & Cat.

Winner of the Special Jury Prize at the Freiburg Festival for Fish & Cat. [17]

Winner of the Best Film Award at the IF-Istanbul Festival for Fish & Cat [18].

Winner of the Critics' Best Film Award at the IF- Istanbul Film Festival for Fish & Cat.

Winner of the Best Audience Film Award from the Balad Film Festival for the film Fish & Cat.

Winner of the Venice Critics Association Award for the screenplay of Careless Crime (shared with Nasim Ahmadpour.

Winner Hugo Silver won the Chicago Film Festival in the main category for the film Careless Crime.

Winner of the Best Screenplay Award (shared with Nasim Ahmadpour ) from the Dhaka International Film Festival for the film Careless Crime.

== See also ==
- Cinema of Iran
- Fajr International Film Festival
