= 61st Chicago International Film Festival =

2025 edition of film festival

- Official poster
- Opening film: One Golden Summer
- Closing film: Eternity
- Location: Chicago, United States
- Founded: 1965
- Awards: Gold Hugo: Sirāt
- Hosted by: Cinema/Chicago
- Artistic director: Mimi Plauché
- No. of films: 181
- Festival date: Opening: October 15, 2025; Closing: October 26, 2025
- Website: www.chicagofilmfestival.com

Chicago International Film Festival
- 2026 2024

The 61st Chicago International Film Festival took place from October 15 to 26, 2025, in Chicago, United States. The festival opened with American documentary film One Golden Summer by Kevin Shaw.

Festival events took place mainly around AMC NEWCITY 14, though other event venues throughout the city include the Music Box Theatre, the Gene Siskel Film Center, the Chicago History Museum, and the Reva and David Logan Center for the Arts at the University of Chicago.

== Background ==
This was the festival's second year having AMC NEWCITY 14 as the main venue. The full film line-up was announced on September 18.

== Official Selection ==
The 61st edition of the festival showcased 111 feature films and 70 short films from over 60 countries, including four world premieres, 17 North American premieres, and 18 United States premieres.

=== Special Presentations ===
English Title	Original Title	Director(s)	Production countrie(s)
Opening Night
One Golden Summer		Kevin Shaw	United States
Centerpiece
Rental Family		Hikari	United States
Closing Night
Eternity		David Freyne	United States
Special Presentations
Bugonia		Yorgos Lanthimos	Ireland, South Korea, United States
Dead Man's Wire		Gus Van Sant	United States
Father Mother Sister Brother		Jim Jarmusch	United States, Ireland, France, Italy, Japan
Frankenstein		Guillermo del Toro	United States
Hamnet		Chloé Zhao	United Kingdom, United States
Hedda		Nia DaCosta	United States
Is This Thing On?		Bradley Cooper	United States
It Was Just an Accident	یک تصادف ساده	Jafar Panahi	Iran, France, Luxembourg
Jay Kelly		Noah Baumbach	United Kingdom, United States
No Other Choice	어쩔수가없다	Park Chan-wook	South Korea
Nouvelle Vague		Richard Linklater	France
Sentimental Value	Affeksjonsverdi	Joachim Trier	Norway, France, Germany, Denmark, Sweden, United Kingdom
The Testament of Ann Lee		Mona Fastvold	United Kingdom, United States
Train Dreams		Clint Bentley	United States
Wake Up Dead Man		Rian Johnson	United States

=== International Competition ===
The festival announced its competitive sections on September 11, 2025. The following films compete for the Gold Hugo of the International Competition:

English Title	Original Title	Director(s)	Production countrie(s)
Black Rabbit, White Rabbit	Харгӯши сиёҳ, харгӯши сафед	Shahram Mokri	Tajikistan, United Arab Emirates
The Currents	Las corrientes	Milagros Mumenthaler	Switzerland, Argentina
Kontinental '25		Radu Jude	Romania, Brazil, Switzerland, United Kingdom, Luxembourg
La Grazia		Paolo Sorrentino	Italy
The Love That Remains	Ástin Sem Eftir Er	Hlynur Pálmason	Iceland, Denmark, France, Finland, Sweden
My Father's Shadow		Akinola Davies Jr.	United Kingdom, Nigeria
Renoir	ルノワール	Chie Hayakawa	Japan, France, Singapore, Philippines, Indonesia
The Secret Agent	O Agente Secreto	Kleber Mendonça Filho	Brazil, France, Germany, Netherlands
Silent Friend	Stille Freundin	Ildikó Enyedi	Germany, France, Hungary
Sirāt		Oliver Laxe	Spain, France
Sound of Falling	In die Sonne schauen	Mascha Schilinski	Germany
The Stranger	L'Étranger	François Ozon	France, Belgium, Morocco
The Voice of Hind Rajab	Ṣawt Hind Rajab	Kaouther Ben Hania	Tunisia, France
Whitetail		Nanouk Leopold	Netherlands, Ireland, Belgium

=== New Directors ===
The following films compete for the Gold Hugo of the New Directors section:

English Title	Original Title	Director(s)	Production countrie(s)
Brand New Landscape	見はらし世代	Yuiga Danzuka	Japan
Christy		Brendan Canty	United Kingdom, Ireland
The Condor Daughter	La Hija Cóndor	Álvaro Olmos Torrico	Bolivia, Peru, Uruguay
Cotton Queen	ملكة القطن	Suzannah Mirghani	Germany, France, Palestine, Egypt, Qatar, Saudi Arabia, Sudan
The Girl in the Snow	L'Engloutie	Louise Hémon	France
Ish		Imran Perretta	United Kingdom
The Kidnapping of Arabella	Il rapimento di Arabella	Carolina Cavalli	Italy
Oca		Karla Badillo	Mexico, Argentina
Short Summer		Nastia Korkia	Germany, France, Serbia
Reedland	Rietland	Sven Bresser	Netherlands, Belgium
Only Heaven Knows	Dünüyö	Nurzhamal Karamoloeva	Kyrgyzstan, United States
Strange River (Note: Nominated for the Q Hugo Award)	Estrany Riu	Jaume Claret Muxart	Spain, Germany
Wind, Talk to Me	Vetre, pričaj sa mnom	Stefan Djordjevic	Serbia, Slovenia, Croatia

=== Documentary Competition ===
The following films compete for the Gold Hugo of the Documentary Competition:

English Title	Original Title	Director(s)	Production countrie(s)
The Beauty of the Donkey	La Beauté de l’Âne	Dea Gjinovci	Switzerland, Kosovo, France, United States
Child of Dust	Dziecko z Pyłu	Weronika Mliczewska	Poland, Vietnam, Sweden, Czech Republic
Celtic Utopia	Útóipe Cheilteach	Dennis Harvey, Lars Lovén	Sweden, Ireland
The Helsinki Effect		Arthur Franck	Finland, Germany, Norway
My Father and Qaddafi		Jihan	Libya
Put Your Soul on Your Hand and Walk		Sepideh Farsi	France, Palestine
The Tale of Silyan		Tamara Kotevska	North Macedonia
True North		Michèle Stephenson	United States, Canada

=== Black Perspectives ===
English Title	Original Title	Director(s)	Production countrie(s)
The Eyes of Ghana		Ben Proudfoot	United States
Pasa Faho		Kalu Oji	Australia
Seeds		Brittany Shyne	United States
Sun Ra: Do the Impossible		Christine Turner	United States

=== Outlook ===
The following films competed for the Q-Hugo Awards, for films with LGBTQ+ themes; some of these competitors appear in other sections and are already listed in previous tables:

English Title	Original Title	Director(s)	Production countrie(s)
Bouchra		Orian Barki, Meriem Bennani	Italy, Morocco, United States
Emi		Ezequiel Erriquez Mena	Argentina, Uruguay
Hedda		Nia DaCosta	United States
The Holy Boy	La valle dei sorrisi	Paolo Strippoli	Italy, Slovenia
The Mysterious Gaze of the Flamingo	La misteriosa mirada del flamenco	Diego Céspedes	Chile, France, Belgium, Spain, Germany
Two Times João Liberada	Duas Vezes João Liberada	Paula Tomás Marques	Portugal
A Useful Ghost	Pee Chai Dai Ka	Ratchapoom Boonbunchachoke	Thailand, France, Singapore, Germany
We Are Pat		Rowan Haber	United States

=== Spotlight ===
English Title	Original Title	Director(s)	Production countrie(s)
Below the Clouds	Sotto le nuvole	Gianfranco Rosi	Italy
Dracula		Radu Jude	Romania, Austria, Luxembourg, Brazil
Franz		Agnieszka Holland	Czech Republic, Poland, Germany, France, Turkey
If I Had Legs I'd Kick You		Mary Bronstein	
Magellan	Magalhães	Lav Diaz	Portugal, Spain, Philippines, France
The Mastermind		Kelly Reichardt	United States, United Kingdom
Miroirs No. 3		Christian Petzold	Germany
Orphan	Árva	László Nemes	Hungary, France, Germany, United Kingdom
Palestine 36		Annemarie Jacir	Palestine, United Kingdom, France, Denmark, Qatar, Saudi Arabia, Jordan
Primavera		Damiano Michieletto	Italy, France
Resurrection	狂野时代	Bi Gan	China, France
Three Goodbyes	Tre Ciotole	Isabel Coixet	Italy, Spain
Two Prosecutors	Два прокурора	Sergei Loznitsa	Latvia, France, Germany, Netherlands, Romania, Lithuania
Young Mothers	Jeunes mères	Jean-Pierre and Luc Dardenne	Belgium, France

=== Snapshots ===
English Title	Original Title	Director(s)	Production countrie(s)
Arco		Ugo Bienvenu	France
Belén		Dolores Fonzi	Argentina
Calle Málaga		Maryam Touzani	Morocco, France, Spain, Germany, Belgium
Dry Leaf	ხმელი ფოთოლი	Alexandre Koberidze	Germany, Georgia
Gazelle		Nadir Sarıbacak, Samy Pioneer	United States, Turkey
Left-Handed Girl	左撇子女孩	Shih-Ching Tsou	Taiwan, France, United States, United Kingdom
Leonora in the Morning Light		Lena Vurma, Thor Klein	Germany, Mexico, Romania, United Kingdom
Luisa		Julia Roesler	Germany
The Plague		Charlie Polinger	Romania, United States
The President's Cake		Hasan Hadi	Iraq, United States, Qatar
The Reckoning of Erin Morrigan		Gabrielle Russell	United Kingdom, Ireland
Spilt Milk		Brian Durnin	Ireland, United Kingdom
This Island	Esta Isla	Cristian Carretero, Lorraine Jones	Puerto Rico
What Does That Nature Say to You	그 자연이 네게 뭐라고 하니	Hong Sang-soo	South Korea

=== After Dark ===
English Title	Original Title	Director(s)	Production countrie(s)
The Book of Sijjin and Illiyyin	Kitab Sijjin Dan Illiyyin	Hadrah Daeng Ratu	Indonesia
Chainsaw Man – The Movie: Reze Arc	Gekijô-ban chensô man reze-hen	Tatsuya Yoshihara	Japan
Mārama		Taratoa Stappard	New Zealand
Mother of Flies		Zelda Adams, John Adams, Toby Poser	United States
New Group		Yûta Shimotsu	Japan
Sisu: Road to Revenge		Jalmari Helander	Finland, United States

=== Comedy ===
English Title	Original Title	Director(s)	Production countrie(s)
Adult Children		Rich Newey	United States
Anything That Moves		Alex Phillips	United States
A Poet	Un poeta	Simón Mesa Soto	Colombia
What Marielle Knows	Was Marielle Weiss	Frédéric Hambalek	Germany

=== City & State ===
English Title	Original Title	Director(s)	Production countrie(s)
Before the Call	Bureum Jeone	James Choi	South Korea
A Brief History of Chasing Storms		Curtis Miller	United States

=== Documentary ===
English Title	Original Title	Director(s)	Production countrie(s)
Cover-Up		Laura Poitras, Mark Obenhaus	United States
Holding Liat		Brandon Kramer	United States
Landmarks	Nuestra Tierra	Lucrecia Martel	Argentina, United States, Mexico, France, Netherlands, Denmark
The Cowboy		André Hörmann	Germany, United States

=== Retrospective ===
English Title	Original Title	Director(s)	Production countrie(s)
Breathless (1960)		Jean-Luc Godard	France
First Cow (2019)		Kelly Reichardt	United States
Highest 2 Lowest (2025)		Spike Lee	United States
Old Joy (2006)		Kelly Reichardt	United States
Showing Up (2022)		Kelly Reichardt	United States
Sugar Cane Alley (1983)	La Rue Cases-Nègres	Euzhan Palcy	France

== Official awards ==
The jury formed by Melina León, Maura Delpero, Peter Kerekes and Gabriel Mayers, conceded the following awards for films shown in International Competition:

- Gold Hugo: Sirāt by Oliver Laxe
- Silver Hugo, Jury Award: The Voice of Hind Rajab by Kaouther Ben Hania
- Silver Hugo, Best Director: Mascha Schilinski for Sound of Falling
- Silver Hugo, Best Actor: Wagner Moura for The Secret Agent
- Silver Hugo, Best Actress: Eszter Tompa for Kontinental '25
- Silver Hugo, Best Screenplay: Paolo Sorrentino for La grazia
- Silver Hugo, Best Cinematography: Gergely Pálos for Silent Friend
- Silver Hugo, Best Sound: Sound of Falling
- Silver Hugo, Animated Short Film: Ordinary Life
- Special Mention: My Father's Shadow

The winners in parallel sections were as follows:

- Gold Hugo, New Directors Competition: Short Summer by Nastia Korkia
- Gold Hugo, International Documentary Competition: Put Your Soul on Your Hand and Walk by Sepideh Farsi
- Gold Q-Hugo, OutLook Competition: Bouchra by Orian Barki, Meriem Bennani
- Chicago Award: One Golden Summer by Kevin Shaw
- Audience Award for U.S. Feature: Rental Family by Hikari

The festival additionally honored the work of following film artists from across genres and disciplines.

- Black Perspectives Artistic Achievement Award: Nia DaCosta, American filmmaker.
- Artistic Achievement Awards:
  - Joel Edgerton, Australian actor and filmmaker
  - Clint Bentley, American film director, film producer and screenwriter
- Spotlight Award: Hikari, Japanese filmmaker and former actress.
- Black Perspectives Tribute and Career Achievement Award: Euzhan Palcy, Martinican film director, screenwriter, and producer
- Lifetime Achievement Award: Spike Lee, American filmmaker
- Visionary Award: Gus Van Sant, American filmmaker, photographer, painter, and musician
