= 2025 Vancouver International Film Festival =

2025 Canadian film festival

- Location: Vancouver, British Columbia, Canada
- Founded: 1958
- Festival date: October 2 - October 12, 2025
- Website: VIFF

Vancouver International Film Festival
- 45th 43rd

The 2025 Vancouver International Film Festival, the 44th event in the history of the Vancouver International Film Festival, was held from October 2 to 12, 2025.

The first batch of film announcements were released on August 6, alongside the announcement of the Arts Club Theatre Company's Granville Island Stage and the Alliance Française as new screening venues. The full program was announced on August 27.

== Awards ==
Winners of the juried awards were announced on October 8, with winners of the audience awards announced on October 17.

Award	Film	Filmmaker
Audience Award, Galas & Special Presentations	Kokuho	Lee Sang-il
Audience Award, Showcase	In the Room	Brishkay Ahmed
Audience Award, Panorama	Meadowlarks	Tasha Hubbard
Audience Award, Vanguard	Gazelle	Nadir Saribacak, Samy Pioneer
Audience Award, Northern Lights	Akashi	Mayumi Yoshida
Audience Award, Insights	Free Leonard Peltier	Jesse Short Bull, David France
Audience Award, Spectrum	Khartoum	Anas Saeed, Rawia Alhag, Ibrahim Snoopy Ahmad, Timeea Mohamed Ahmed, Philip Cox
Audience Award, Portraits	The Essence of Eva	Malcolm Willis, Alex Fegan
Audience Award, Altered States	Fucktoys	Annapurna Sriram
Audience Award, Spotlight on Korea	3670	Park Joon-ho
Audience Award, Focus	Bad Girl	Varsha Bharath
Best Canadian Film	The Things You Kill	Alireza Khatami
Best Canadian Documentary	The Track	Ryan Sidhoo
Best Short Film	No Skate!	Guil Sela
Emerging Canadian Director	Blue Heron	Sophy Romvari
Best BC Film	Blue Heron	Sophy Romvari
Vanguard Award	Wind, Talk to Me	Stefan Đorđević

== Films ==
=== Galas and special presentations ===
English title	Original title	Director(s)	Production country
After the Hunt		Luca Guadagnino	Italy, United States
Christy		David Michôd	United States
Father Mother Sister Brother		Jim Jarmusch	United States, Ireland, France
Franz		Agnieszka Holland	Czech Republic, Poland, Germany, France, Turkey
It Was Just an Accident	یک تصادف ساده	Jafar Panahi	Iran, France, Luxembourg
Jay Kelly		Noah Baumbach	United Kingdom, United States
Kokuho		Lee Sang-il	Japan
Köln 75		Ido Fluk	Poland, Germany, Belgium
The Mastermind		Kelly Reichardt	United States
Mile End Kicks		Chandler Levack	Canada
Nirvanna the Band the Show the Movie		Matt Johnson	Canada
No Other Choice	Eojjeol suga eopda	Park Chan-wook	South Korea
Nouvelle Vague		Richard Linklater	France
Palestine 36		Annemarie Jacir	Palestine, United Kingdom, France, Denmark, Qatar, Saudi Arabia, Jordan
A Private Life	Vie Privée	Rebecca Zlotowski	France
Rental Family		Hikari	United States
The Secret Agent	O Agente Secreto	Kleber Mendonça Filho	Brazil, France, Netherlands, Germany
Sentimental Value	Affeksjonsverdi	Joachim Trier	Norway, France, Denmark, Germany, Sweden, United Kingdom
Sirāt		Oliver Laxe	France, Spain
Steal Away		Clement Virgo	Canada, Belgium
Wake Up Dead Man		Rian Johnson	United States
Young Mothers	Jeunes mères	Jean-Pierre Dardenne, Luc Dardenne	Belgium, France

=== Showcase ===
English title	Original title	Director(s)	Production country
Arco		Ugo Bienvenu	France
Blue Moon		Richard Linklater	United States, Ireland
The Blue Trail	O Último Azul	Gabriel Mascaro	Brazil, Mexico, Chile, Netherlands
Calle Malaga		Maryam Touzani	Morocco, France, Spain, Germany, Belgium
Case 137	Dossier 137	Dominik Moll	France
Father	Otec	Tereza Nvotová	Slovakia, Czech Republic, Poland
La grazia		Paolo Sorrentino	Italy
In the Room		Brishkay Ahmed	Canada
Left-Handed Girl	左撇子女孩	Shih-Ching Tsou	Taiwan, France, United States, United Kingdom
The Little Sister	La Petite Dernière	Hafsia Herzi	France, Germany
Living the Land	生息之地	Huo Meng	China
The Love That Remains	Ástin Sem Eftir Er	Hlynur Pálmason	Iceland, Denmark, Sweden, France
Lovely Day	Mille secrets mille dangers	Philippe Falardeau	Canada
Miroirs No. 3		Christian Petzold	Germany
Orphan	Árva	László Nemes	Hungary, France, Germany, United Kingdom
Orwell: 2+2=5		Raoul Peck	United States, France
Pillion		Harry Lighton	United Kingdom
Renoir	ルノワール	Chie Hayakawa	Japan, France, Singapore, Philippines, Indonesia, Qatar
Resurrection	狂野时代	Bi Gan	China, France
Romería		Carla Simón	Spain, Belgium, Germany
Silent Friend	Stille Freundin	Ildikó Enyedi	Germany, France, Hungary
Sound of Falling	In Die Sonne Schauen	Mascha Schilinski	Germany
Two Prosecutors	Два прокурора	Sergei Loznitsa	France, Germany, Netherlands, Latvia, Romania, Lithuania
Tuner		Daniel Roher	United States
What Does That Nature Say to You	Geu jayeoni nege mworago hani	Hong Sang-soo	South Korea
Wrong Husband	Uiksaringitara	Zacharias Kunuk	Canada
Youngblood		Hubert Davis	Canada

=== Panorama ===
English title	Original title	Director(s)	Production country
As the Water Flows	Cui Hu	Zhuo Bian	China
Bidad		Soheil Beiraghi	Iran
Blood Lines		Gail Maurice	Canada
Brand New Landscape	Miharashi Sedai	Yuiga Danzuka	Japan
Broken Voices	Sbormistr	Ondřej Provazník	Czech Republic
The Condor Daughter	La Hija Cóndor	Álvaro Olmos Torrico	Bolivia, Peru, Uruguay
Fantasy		Kukla	Slovenia, North Macedonia
Human Resource		Nawapol Thamrongrattanarit	Thailand
Hysteria		Mehmet Akif Büyükatalay	Germany
The Ice Tower	La tour de glace	Lucile Hadžihalilović	France, Germany, Italy
Idiotka		Natasya Popov	United States
If I Had Legs I'd Kick You		Mary Bronstein	United States
The Ivy	Hiedra	Ana Cristina Barragán	Ecuador, Mexico, France, Spain
Kontinental '25		Radu Jude	Romania, Brazil, Switzerland, United Kingdom, Luxembourg
Last Night in Taipei		Cheng-Chui Kuo	Taiwan, France
The Last One for the Road	Le città di pianura	Francesco Sossai	Italy, Germany
Late Shift	Heldin	Petra Volpe	Switzerland, Germany
Lucky Lu	幸福之路	Lloyd Lee Choi	Canada, United States
MA - Cry of Silence	မ	The Maw Naing	Myanmar, South Korea, Singapore, France, Norway, Qatar
Mad Bills to Pay (or Destiny, dile que no soy malo)		Joel Alfonso Vargas	United States
Meadowlarks		Tasha Hubbard	Canada
The Message	El mensaje	Iván Fund	Argentina, Spain
Middle Life		Pavan Moondi	Canada
My Father's Son	Bi Ru Fu Zi	Qiu Sheng	China, France
The Mysterious Gaze of the Flamingo	La misteriosa mirada del flamenco	Diego Céspedes	Chile, France
Peak Everything	Amour Apocalypse	Anne Émond	Canada
A Poet	Un poeta	Simón Mesa Soto	Colombia
The President's Cake	مملكة القصب	Hasan Hadi	Iraq, Qatar, United States
Saikai Paradise	Saikai Rakuen	Keiko Tsuruoka	Japan
The Scout		Paula González-Nasser	United States
Skin of Youth	Ồn ào tuổi trẻ	Ash Mayfair	Vietnam, Singapore, Japan
Solomamma		Janicke Askevold	Norway, Latvia, Lithuania, Denmark, Finland
Tape		Bizhan Tong	Hong Kong, United Kingdom
The Things You Kill		Alireza Khatami	Canada, France, Poland, Turkey
Train Dreams		Clint Bentley	United States

=== Spotlight on Korea ===
English title	Original title	Director(s)	Production country
3670		Park Joon-ho	South Korea
Edhi Alice: Take		Kim Ilrhan	South Korea
No Other Choice	Eojjeol suga eopda	Park Chan-wook	South Korea
The Nonsense		Lee Je-hui	South Korea
Savon	Binu	Lee Jun Sup	South Korea
Sua's Home	Kaerieoreul kkeuneun sonyeo	Yun Simkyoung	South Korea
What Does That Nature Say to You	Geu jayeoni nege mworago hani	Hong Sang-soo	South Korea
Winter Light	Gyeourui Bit	Cho Hyun-suh	South Korea
Wrangler	Hunryeonsa	Seo Eun-sun	South Korea

=== Vanguard ===
English title	Original title	Director(s)	Production country
The Bora	Sardbad	Mohammad Esmaeili	Iran
Dance of the Living	La lucha	José Alayón	Spain, Colombia
Eel	Hé mán	Chu Chun-Teng	Taiwan
Gazelle		Nadir Saribacak, Samy Pioneer	United States, Turkey
God Will Not Help	Bog Neće Pomoći	Hana Jušić	Croatia, Italy, Romania, Greece, France, Slovenia
Little Trouble Girls	Kaj ti je deklica	Urška Djukić	Slovenia, Italy, Croatia, Serbia
Thus Spoke the Wind		Maria Rigel	Armenia
Wind, Talk to Me	Vetre, pričaj sa mnom	Stefan Djordjevic	Serbia, Slovenia, Croatia

=== Northern Lights ===
English title	Original title	Director(s)	Production country
100 Sunset		Kunsang Kyirong	Canada
Akashi		Mayumi Yoshida	Canada
Blue Heron		Sophy Romvari	Canada, Hungary
Clan of the Painted Lady		Jennifer Chiu	Canada
Finch & Midland		Timothy Yeung	Canada, Hong Kong
Follies	Folichonneries	Eric K. Boulianne	Canada
Hemela		Pirouz Nemati	Canada, Iran
Modern Whore		Nicole Bazuin	Canada
Nesting	Peau à peau	Chloé Cinq-Mars	Canada
Nika and Madison		Eva Thomas	Canada
Thanks to the Hard Work of the Elephants		Bryce Hodgson	Canada
The Track		Ryan Sidhoo	Canada, Bosnia
Treasure of the Rice Terraces		Kent Donguines	Canada, Philippines
A Welcome Distraction		Brian Daniel Johnson	Canada

=== Insights ===
English title	Original title	Director(s)	Production country
Cover-Up		Laura Poitras, Mark Obenhaus	United States
Everest Dark		Jereme Watt	Canada
Factory	Gong Chang	Hao Zhou	China
Free Leonard Peltier		Jesse Short Bull, David France	United States
How to Build a Library		Maia Lekow, Christopher King	United States
I Died	Li Cham	Ana Ts’uyeb	Mexico
Landmarks	Nuestra tierra	Lucrecia Martel	Argentina, United States, Mexico, France, Denmark, Netherlands
Life After		Reid Davenport	United States
Marriage Cops		Shashwati Talukdar, Cheryl Hess	India, United States
Remaining Native		Paige Bethmann	United States
Seeds		Brittany Shyne	United States
The Shadow Scholars		Eloise King	United Kingdom
Shifting Baselines		Julien Élie	Canada
Walls - Akinni Inuk		Sofie Rørdam, Nina Paninnguaq Skydsbjerg	Greenland
With Hasan in Gaza	مع حسن في غزّة	Kamal Aljafari	Palestine, Germany, Switzerland, France, Qatar

=== Spectrum ===
English title	Original title	Director(s)	Production country
Agatha's Almanac		Amalie Atkins	Canada
Always		Deming Chen	United States, France, Taiwan, China
Ancestral Visions of the Future		Lemohang Jeremiah Mosese	France, Lesotho, Germany, Qatar, Saudi Arabia
BLKNWS: Terms & Conditions		Kahlil Joseph	United States
Edhi Alice: Take		Kim Ilrhan	South Korea
Fiume o morte!		Igor Bezinović	Croatia, Italy, Slovenia
The Great North		Jenn Nkiru	United Kingdom
Khartoum		Anas Saeed, Rawia Alhag, Ibrahim Snoopy Ahmad, Timeea Mohamed Ahmed, Philip Cox	Sudan, United Kingdom, Germany, Qatar
Memory of Princess Mumbi		Daniel Hauser	Kenya, Switzerland
WTO/99		Ian Bell	United States
Your Touch Makes Others Invisible		Rajee Samarasinghe	Sri Lanka, United States

=== Portraits ===
English title	Original title	Director(s)	Production country
Are We Good?		Steven Feinartz	United States
The Art of Adventure		Alison Reid	Canada
Assembly		Rashaad Newsome, Johnny Symons	United States
Caravaggio		David Bickerstaff, Phil Grabsky	United Kingdom
The Essence of Eva		Malcolm Willis, Alex Fegan	Ireland
Half Moon: Kinan Azmeh		Frank Scheffer	Netherlands
I Want It All: Hildegard Knef	Ich will alles. Hildegard Knef	Luzia Schmid	Germany
John Candy: I Like Me		Colin Hanks	United States
The Painted Life of E.J. Hughes		Jenn Strom	Canada
Particle Dance	ryushi no dance	Hiromoto Oka	Japan
La Salsa Vive		Juan Carvajal	Colombia, United States
Sun Ra: Do the Impossible		Christine Turner	United States

=== Leading Lights ===
Guest curator: Matthew Rankin.

English title	Original title	Director(s)	Production country
Divine Intervention	يد إلهية	Elia Suleiman	France, Germany, Morocco, Palestine
Lights in the Dusk	Laitakaupungin valot	Aki Kaurismäki	Finland, Germany, France
A Moment of Innocence	Nūn o Goldūn	Mohsen Makhmalbaf	Iran, France
News from Home		Chantal Akerman	France, Belgium

=== Focus: Edges of Belonging ===
English title	Original title	Director(s)	Production country
Bad Girl		Varsha Bharath	India
CycleMahesh		Suhel Banerjee	India
Hidden Tremors	Bhoothalam	P.G. Sreekanth	India
I Am Revathi	Njaan Revathi	P. Abhijith	India
Secrets of a Mountain Serpent		Nidhi Saxena	India

=== Altered States ===
English title	Original title	Director(s)	Production country
Dead Lover		Grace Glowicki	Canada
Death Does Not Exist	La mort n'existe pas	Félix Dufour-Laperrière	Canada, France
Deathstalker		Steven Kostanski	United States, Canada
Dracula		Radu Jude	Romania, Austria, Luxembourg, Brazil
Foreigner		Ava Maria Safai	Canada
Fucktoys		Annapurna Sriram	United States
Honey Bunch		Madeleine Sims-Fewer, Dusty Mancinelli	Canada
Night Stage	Ato Noturno	Marcio Reolon, Filipe Matzembacher	Brazil
OBEX		Albert Birney	United States
Our Hero, Balthazar		Oscar Boyson	United States
The Plague		Charlie Bolinger	United States, Romania
A Useful Ghost	ผีใช้ได้ค่ะ	Ratchapoom Boonbunchachoke	Thailand, France, Singapore, Germany

=== Short Forum ===
English title	Original title	Director(s)	Province
The 12 Inch Pianist		Lucas Ansel	United States
Adieu Ugarit		Samy Benammar	Canada
Ambush	Kameen	Yassmina Karajah	Canada, Jordan
Arguments in Favor of Love		Gabriel Abrantes	Portugal
Baadarane		Samah El Kadi	Lebanon
Ball Lightning		Trina Baker	United States
Bleat!		Ananth Subramaniam	Malaysia, Philippines
Bread Will Walk		Alex Boya	Canada
Budget Paradise		LaTajh Simmons-Weaver	United States
Canada in the 12th Century		Jack Parker	Canada
Cocotte Coulombe, Filmmaker	Cocotte Coulombe, cinéaste	Charles-François Asselin	Canada
Confluence		Charlene R. Moore, Oliver Darrius Merrick King	Canada
The Death of the Fish		Eva Lusbaronian	France
Dinner		Hyejin Yoo	South Korea
Extra Life (And Decay)		Stéphanie Lagarde	Netherlands, France
Father Alphonse and the Fight Between Carnival and Lent		Diana Thorneycroft	Canada
The Foreigner		Wen-Shuo Hsueh	Taiwan
Four Walls of Memory		Joanna Płatek	Poland
The Glass Essays		River Yuhao Cao	United Kingdom, China
Good Luck to You All		Cordell Barker	Canada
Healer		Chelsea McMullan	Canada
The Housekeeper		Surya Balakrishnan	India
How to Live Together		Tim Nicholas	United States
In My Hand		Marja Helander, Liselotte Wajstedt	Norway
Inanna		Dragos Badita	Romania, Canada
Jeff		Julia Hebner	United States
The Light of Immortality		Mikołaj Janik	Poland
A Light That Doesn't Dim		Colby Barrios	United States
The Littles		Andrew Duplessie	United States, Canada
Living Grounds		Emile Lavoie	Canada
Loynes		Dorian Jespers	Belgium
A Metamorphosis		Lin Htet Aung	Myanmar
Mother of Dawn		Clara Trevisan	Belgium, Brazil, Finland, Portugal
Muljil: Diving		Young Eun Yoo (Yooye)	South Korea
My Comrade		Tathagata Ghosh	India
My Dad is an Astronaut		Bianca Rose Cheung	Canada
Nine Times Better		Lorenzo Follari, Emma Dock	Sweden
No Matter the Weather	Beau temps, mauvais temps	Florence Lafond	Canada
No One Knows I Disappeared		Hanxiong Bo	China
No Skate!		Guil Sela	France
Not Enough for the Love Inside		Marcelo Matos de Oliveira, Wallace Nogueira	Brazil
One Duck Down		Lindsay Aksarniq McIntyre	Canada
Origin		Marion Chuniaud-Lacau	Canada, Colombia
Orlo with Karma		Kangdrun	China
Our Pantheons		Rosalie Charrier	France
Our Room		Jaume Claret Muxart	Spain
Paradaïz		Matea Radic	Canada
Paradise Heights		Karl Kai, Robert Mentov	Canada
Pow!		Joseph Clift	United States
Ramón Who Speaks to Ghosts		Shervin Kermani	Canada
Resistance Meditation		Sara Wylie	Canada
ripe	chín	Solara Thanh Bình Đặng	Canada
The River		Herrana Addisu	United States
Pidikwe (Rumble)		Caroline Monnet	Canada
Santa Clara: Birth in Three Phases		Arturo Franco, Tono Mejuto	Spain
Skin on Skin		Simon Schneckenburger	Germany
A Soft Touch		Heather Young	Canada
The Sphinx		Jesse Padveen	Canada, United States
Tears Burn to Ash		Natalie Murao	Canada
Thanks to Meet You!		Richard Hunter	United Kingdom
There's a Devil Inside Me		Karina Lomelin Ripper	United States
Tiger		Loren Waters	United States
To Look, and to Look Again		Monica Cheema	Canada
Le Tour De Canada		John Hollands	Canada
Two People Exchanging Saliva	Deux personnes échangeant de la salive	Alexandre Singh, Natalie Musteata	France, United States
A Very Straight Neck		Neo Sora	Japan
WASSUPKAYLEE		Pepi Ginsberg	France, United States
Water Girl		Sandra Desmazières	France, Netherlands, Portugal
We Were the Scenery		Christopher Radcliff	United States
Wednesdays with Gramps		Chris Copeland, Justin Copeland	United States
Weekend One		Mykea Fairweather Perry	United Kingdom
Winkie		Daniel Duranleau	Canada
Yves and His Bonsaïs	Yves et ses bonsaïs	Ophelia Spinosa	Canada

=== Modes ===
English title	Original title	Director(s)	Production country
+10K		Gala Hernández López	Spain, France
Abortion Party		Julia Mellen	Spain
Anatomy of a Lost Sound		Zuko Garagić	Bosnia and Herzegovina, Czech Republic, United States
Blind, Into The Eye		Atefeh Kheirabadi, Mehrad Sepahnia	Iran, Germany
BOA		Alexandre Dostie	Canada, France
Daria's Night Flower		Maryam Tafakory	Iran, United Kingdom, France
Force Times Displacement		Angel Wu	Taiwan
Goodbye, Fishies		Jonathan Zhang	Australia
happiness		Fırat Yücel	Netherlands, Turkey
It Must Be Because I Decided to Leave		Zhuoyun Chen	China, United States
L'mina		Randa Maroufi	Morocco, France, Italy, Qatar
Lloyd Wong, Unfinished		Lesley Loksi Chan	Canada
Monument		Jeremy Drummond	United States
Rezbotanik		Pedro Gonçalves Ribeiro	Portugal, Brazil, Spain
Samba Infinito		Leonardo Martinelli	Brazil, France
Sixty-Seven Milliseconds		Fleuryfontaine	France
The Uniformed		Timon Ott	Germany
