= In the Room =

In the Room may refer to:

- In the Room (2015 film), a 2015 erotic drama film directed by Eric Khoo
- In the Room (2025 film), a 2025 Canadian documentary film directed by Brishkay Ahmed
- "In the Room", an episode of The West Wing (season 6)
- "In the Room", a 2019 song by twlv
