= Mayumi Yoshida =

Mayumi Yoshida may refer to:

- Mayumi Yoshida (Canadian actress), a Japanese-born Canadian actress and filmmaker
- Mayumi Yoshida (Japanese voice actress)
