= Gazelle (film) =

2025 American independent drama film

- Festival release poster
- Directed by: Nadir Sarıbacak; Samy Pioneer
- Written by: Nadir Sarıbacak; Ayhan Hulagu
- Produced by: Mehmet Tözün; Kenan Baysal; Ender Zirekoğlu
- Starring: Nadir Sarıbacak; Abraham Taylor; Faysal Ahmed; Ziad Alezabi; Salem Hadeed; Emine Bayındır; Sare Aydoğan; Ayhan Hulagu
- Cinematography: Lasse Ulvedal Tolbøll, DFF
- Edited by: Samy Pioneer
- Music by: Ichika Kanagawa
- Production companies: Roaring Cat Films; ArtVertora Production
- Release date: October 3, 2025 (VIFF)
- Running time: 100 minutes
- Country: United States
- Languages: English; Turkish

Gazelle is a 2025 American independent drama film directed by Nadir Sarıbacak and Samy Pioneer in their feature directorial debuts. Written by Sarıbacak and Ayhan Hulagu, the film stars Sarıbacak as Yakup, a Turkish music teacher who migrates to New York following political unrest in Turkey and struggles to reunite with his family.

The film premiered at the 2025 Vancouver International Film Festival in the Vanguard section and later screened at the 2025 Chicago International Film Festival.

== Plot ==
Yakup, a music teacher from Turkey, relocates to New York after political turmoil forces him into exile. Living alone and undocumented, he attempts to bring his wife Ayşe and daughter Neşe to the United States. When legal options stall, Yakup faces a moral dilemma that places increasing strain on his mental health and family ties.

== Cast ==
- Nadir Sarıbacak as Yakup
- Abraham Taylor as Hakim
- Faysal Ahmed as Ahmed
- Ziad Alezabi as Omar
- Salem Hadeed as Ammi
- Emine Bayındır as Ayşe
- Sare Aydoğan as Neşe
- Ayhan Hulagu as Adem

== Production ==
Gazelle was produced by Roaring Cat Films in association with ArtVertora Production. Cinematography was handled by Lasse Ulvedal Tolbøll, DFF, with editing by Samy Pioneer and original score by Ichika Kanagawa.

Sarıbacak began writing the screenplay with Hulagu during his early years in the United States, while working as a ride-share driver; the two drew on the experiences of friends who had been separated from their families. The film's title comes from a parable about a pregnant gazelle trapped between a hunter and a lion, which opens the film.

== Release ==
The film had its world premiere on October 3, 2025, at the Vancouver International Film Festival Vanguard section. VIFF programmer Sonja Baksa described the film as "emotionally charged and profoundly moving". Its U.S. premiere followed at the Chicago International Film Festival on October 24, 2025.

The film was later selected for the 2026 edition of Dances With Films: New York, which took place from January 15 to 18, 2026.

Following its screening at Dances With Films: New York, Gazelle won the Industry Choice Award for films over 40 minutes.

In early 2026, the film was selected for the Sedona International Film Festival, which ran from February 21 to March 1, 2026, as part of its 32nd annual lineup. MovieMaker described it as one of the highlights of the festival.

The film had its European premiere at the Aegean Film Festival on Patmos in July 2026.

In April 2026, following its festival run, Sarıbacak announced a theatrical tour of the United States. In autumn 2026 the film screened in Oslo, Frankfurt, Cologne and Paris, followed by screenings in German cinemas from mid-October through November. It played a week-long run at the Laemmle Town Center 5 in Encino, Los Angeles, from October 22 to 29, 2026.

== Reception ==
Gazelle received generally positive reviews from film critics, with particular praise directed at its lead performance and its restrained depiction of the immigrant experience.

Kent Hill of Film Threat gave the film a score of 8 out of 10, praising Sarıbacak's "masterful, central performance" and calling the film "brutal and beautiful".

In Pancouver, Adrian Mack praised Nadir Sarıbacak’s portrayal of Yakup, calling it “compelling from start to finish.”

Coverage in the Chicago Sun-Times included the film among notable selections at the 2025 Chicago International Film Festival.

Reviewing the film after its Dances With Films: New York screening, The Black C.A.P.E. emphasized its depiction of systemic obstacles faced by immigrants in the United States.

Writing for Exclaim!, Courtney Small gave the film 7 out of 10, describing Sarıbacak's performance as "gripping and moving", while noting that the film at times leans heavily into despair.

Bijan Tehrani of Cinema Without Borders called the film "an important addition to contemporary immigrant cinema".

== Accolades ==
Gazelle received the VIFF Vanguard Audience Award at the 2025 Vancouver International Film Festival.

At the 2026 edition of Dances With Films: New York, the film won the Industry Choice Award for films over 40 minutes.
