= 73rd San Sebastián International Film Festival =

2025 film festival

- Official poster featuring Marisa Paredes
- Opening film: 27 Nights
- Closing film: Winter of the Crow
- Location: San Sebastián, Spain
- Awards: Golden Shell: Sundays
- Directors: José Luis Rebordinos
- Festival date: 19–27 September 2025

San Sebastián International Film Festival
- 74th 72nd

The 73rd San Sebastián International Film Festival took place from 19 to 27 September 2025 in San Sebastián, Gipuzkoa, Spain.

Alauda Ruiz de Azúa's Sundays went on to win the Golden Shell, while José Luis Guerin's Good Valley Stories landed the Special Jury Prize.

== Background ==
In February 2025, a 4K restoration of Poachers was announced as a double screening at the 28th Málaga Film Festival and the 73rd San Sebastián International Film Festival ('Klasikoak' section). In June 2025, the Basque medium-length films Hamaseigarrenean aidane, Ehun metro, Zergatik panpox, and Oraingoz izen gabe, restored at L'Immagine Ritrovata restoration lab in Bologna, were announced as additional screenings in the 'Klasikoak' programme.

On 11 July 2025, a line-up of 22 Spanish-produced works to be screened at the festival was announced at the Academia de las Artes y las Ciencias Cinematográficas de España. Later in the month, producer Esther García was announced as the recipient of a Donostia Award for Career Achievement. In August 2025, the festival announced actress and producer Jennifer Lawrence as an additional Donostia Award recipient as well as a screening of Die My Love.

Sílvia Abril, Toni Acosta, and Itziar Ituño hosted the opening gala, in which Walter Salles was bestowed the 2025 FIPRESCI Grand Prix for I'm Still Here. Daniel Hendler's 27 Nights screened as the opening film. The closing gala was hosted by Itsaso Arana and Óscar Lasarte while the screening of Kasia Adamik's Winter of the Crow closed the festival.

== Juries ==
=== Official Selection jury ===
- J. A. Bayona, Spanish filmmaker – Jury president
- Laura Carreira, Portuguese filmmaker based in Edinburgh, Scotland
- Gia Coppola, American film director and screenwriter
- Zhou Dongyu, Chinese actress
- Lali Espósito, Argentine singer, actress, dancer, and model
- Mark Strong, British actor
- Anne-Dominique Toussaint, film producer, founder of Les Films des Tournelles

=== Kutxabank-New Directors Award jury ===
- Marco Müller, Italian producer and programmer – Jury president
- Isabella Eklöf, Swedish screenwriter and film director
- Charlène Favier, French filmmaker and screenwriter
- Beatriz Arias, Chilean film director, screenwriter and assistant director
- Elsa Fernández Santos, Spanish film critic

=== Horizontes Make & Mark Award jury ===
- Pilar Palomero, Spanish director (president)
- Christoph Friedel, German producer
- Tatiana Leite, Brazilian producer

=== Zabaltegi-Tabakalera Award jury ===
- Yaël Fogiel, French producer (president)
- Xabier Arakistain, Spanish art curator
- Line Langebek Knudsen, Danish screenwriter

=== RTVE – Another Look Award jury ===
- María Solana, journalist and RTVE managing board member (president)
- Gemma Blasco, filmmaker
- Amaia Ereñaga, journalist

=== Irizar Basque Film Award jury ===
- Ane Gabarain, actress (president)
- Aia Kruse, actress
- Urtzi Urkizu, journalist

== Sections ==
=== Official selection ===
The official selection slate includes the following pictures:

==== In competition ====
Highlighted title indicates award winner.

English title	Original title	Director(s)	Production country(ies)
27 Nights	27 noches	Daniel Hendler	Argentina
Ballad of a Small Player		Edward Berger	United Kingdom
Belén		Dolores Fonzi	Argentina
Couture		Alice Winocour	France; United States
The Currents	Las corrientes	Milagros Mumenthaler	Switzerland; Argentina
The Fence	Le Cri des Gardes	Claire Denis	France
Franz		Agnieszka Holland	Czech Republic; Germany; Poland
Good Valley Stories	Historias del buen valle	José Luis Guerin	Spain; France
Her Heart Beats in Its Cage	监狱来的妈妈	Xiaoyu Qin	China
Maspalomas		Jose Mari Goenaga, Aitor Arregi	Spain
Nuremberg		James Vanderbilt	United States
SAI: disaster	災 劇場版	Kentaro Hirase, Yutaro Seki	Japan
Six Days in Spring	Six jours ce printemps-là	Joachim Lafosse	Belgium; France; Luxembourg
Sundays	Los domingos	Alauda Ruiz de Azúa	Spain; France
Los Tigres		Alberto Rodríguez	Spain
Two Pianos	Deux pianos	Arnaud Desplechin	France
Ungrateful Beings	Nevděčné bytosti	Olmo Omerzu	Czech Republic; Slovenia; Poland; Slovakia; Croatia; France

==== Out of Competition ====
English title	Original title	Director(s)	Production country(ies)
She Walks in Darkness	Un fantasma en la batalla	Agustín Díaz Yanes	Spain
The Anatomy of a Moment (series)	Anatomía de un instante	Alberto Rodríguez	Spain
Winter of the Crow		Kasia Adamik	Poland; United Kingdom; Luxembourg
Special Screenings
Climbing for Life	てっぺんの向こうにあなたがいる	Junji Sakamoto	Japan
Fate (series)	La suerte	Paco Plaza, Pablo Guerrero	Spain
Flores para Antonio		Elena Molina, Isaki Lacuesta	Spain
In-I In Motion		Juliette Binoche	France
Karmele		Asier Altuna	Spain
Sky Mouths (series)	Zeru ahoak	Koldo Almandoz	Spain

=== New Directors ===
The New Directors slate includes:

Highlighted title indicates award winner.

English title	Original title	Director(s)	Production country(ies)
Aro berria		Irati Gorostidi Agirretxe	Spain
Before the Bright Day	南方時光	Tsao Shih-Han	Taiwan
As We Breathe	Aldığımız Nefes	Seyhmus Altun	Turkey; Denmark
Bad Apples		Jonatan Etzler	United Kingdom
Foreign Lands	Чужие земли	Anton Yarush, Sergey Borovkov	Russia
Dance of the Living	La lucha	José Alayón	Spain; Colombia
If We Don't Burn, How Do We Light Up the Night	Si no ardemos, cómo iluminar la noche	Kim Torres	Costa Rica; Mexico; France
Nighttime Sounds	你的眼睛比太阳明亮	Zhang Zhongchen	China
Redoubt	Värn	John Skoog	Sweden; Denmark; Netherlands; Poland; Finland; United Kingdom; Switzerland
Shape of Momo	द शेप आप मोमोज	Tribeny Rai	India; South Korea
The Son and the Sea		Stroma Cairns	United Kingdom
Weightless	Vægtløs	Emilie Thalund	Denmark
White Flowers and Fruits	Shiro no Kajitsu	Yukari Sakamoto	Japan

=== Latin Horizons (Horizontes latinos) ===
The Latin Horizon slate includes:

Highlighted title indicates award winner.

English title	Original title	Director(s)	Production country(ies)
Copper	Cobre	Nicolás Pereda	Mexico; Canada
Cuerpo celeste		Nayra Ilic García	Chile; Italy
Dolores		Maria Clara Escobar, Marcelo Gomes	Brazil
Elder Son	Hijo mayor	Cecilia Kang	Argentina; France
The Ivy	Hiedra	Ana Cristina Barragán	Ecuador; Mexico; France; Spain
Landmarks	Nuestra tierra	Lucrecia Martel	Argentina; United States; Mexico; France; Netherlands; Denmark
Limpia		Dominga Sotomayor	Chile
A Loose End	Un cabo suelto	Daniel Hendler	Uruguay; Argentina; Spain
The Message	El mensaje	Iván Fund	Argentina; Spain; Uruguay
The Mysterious Gaze of the Flamingo	La misteriosa mirada del flamenco	Diego Céspedes	Chile; France; Germany; Spain; Belgium
Olmo		Fernando Eimbcke	United States; Mexico
A Poet	Un poeta	Simón Mesa Soto	Colombia; Germany; Sweden

=== Zabaltegi-Tabakalera ===
The Zabaltegi-Tabakalera section includes:

Highlighted title indicates award winner.

English title	Original title	Director(s)	Production country(ies)
Always Night	Siempre es de noche	Luis Ortega	Argentina
April Tune	Sol menor	André Silva Santos	Portugal
Blue Heron		Sophy Romvari	Canada; Hungary
Brand New Landscape	Miharashi sedai	Yuiga Danzuka	Japan
Fiume o morte!		Igor Bezinović	Croatia; Italy; Slovenia
God is Shy	Dieu est timide	Jocelyn Charles	France
The Good Sister	Schwesterherz	Sarah Miro Fischer	Germany; Spain
Happiness	La felicidad	Paz Encina	Paraguay
Hen	Kota	György Pálfi	Germany; Greece; Hungary
The Ice Tower	La tour de glace	Lucile Hadzihalilovic	France; Germany
Joan of Arc	Jóhanna af Örk	Hlynur Pálmason	Iceland; Denmark; France
The Last Rapture	El último arrebato	Marta Medina, Enrique López Lavigne	Spain
Lurker		Alex Russell	United States
No One Knows I Disappeared		Bo Hanxiong	China
A Scary Movie	Una película de miedo	Sergio Oksman	Spain; Portugal
The Spectacle		Bálint Kenyeres	Hungary; France
Strange River	Estrany riu	Jaume Claret Muxart	Spain; Germany
The Strike	La grève	Gabrielle Stemmer	France
Two Seasons, Two Strangers	旅と日々	Sho Miyake	Japan
Two Times João Liberada	Duas vezes João Liberada	Paula Tomás Marques	Portugal
Under the Flags, the Sun	Bajo las banderas, el sol	Juanjo Pereira	Paraguay; Argentina; USA; France; Germany
Urchin		Harris Dickinson	United Kingdom
Variations	Bariazioak	Lur Olaizola Lizarralde	Spain

=== Perlak ===
The Perlak slate includes:

Highlighted title indicates City of Donostia / San Sebastián Audience Award winner.
Highlighted title indicates City of Donostia / San Sebastián Audience Award for Best European Film winner.

English title	Original title	Director(s)	Production country(ies)
Nouvelle Vague		Richard Linklater	France
A Private Life	Vie privée	Rebecca Zlotowski	France
Sentimental Value	Affeksjonsverdi	Joachim Trier	Norway; France; Denmark; Germany
Little Amélie or the Character of Rain	Amélie et la Métaphysique des tubes	Maïlys Vallade, Liane-Cho Han	France
The Love That Remains	Ástin Sem Eftir Er	Hlynur Pálmason	Iceland; Denmark; Sweden; France
Bugonia		Yorgos Lanthimos	United Kingdom
Sleepless City	Ciudad sin sueño	Guillermo Galoe	Spain; France
Jay Kelly		Noah Baumbach	United States; United Kingdom; Italy
The Stranger	L'Étranger	François Ozon	France
La grazia		Paolo Sorrentino	Italy
The Wizard of the Kremlin	Le Mage du Kremlin	Olivier Assayas	France
The President's Cake	مملكة القصب	Hasan Hadi	Iraq; United States; Qatar
The Secret Agent	O Agente Secreto	Kleber Mendonça Filho	Brazil; France; Germany; Netherlands
Orwell: 2+2=5		Raoul Peck	France; United States
The Voice of Hind Rajab	صوت هند رجب	Kaouther Ben Hania	Tunisia; France
It Was Just an Accident	یک تصادف ساده	Jafar Panahi	Iran; France; Luxembourg

=== Velodrome (Velódromo) ===
The following pictures will be screened at the Velodrome:

English title	Original title	Director(s)	Production countrie(s)
Hasta que me quede sin voz		Mario Forniés, Lucas Nolla	Spain
Band Together	Rondallas	Daniel Sánchez Arévalo	Spain

=== Made in Spain ===
The films in the 'Made in Spain' programming include:

English title	Original title	Director(s)	Production countrie(s)
Abril, It's Not Winter Today	Abril, hoy no es invierno	Mabel Lozano	Spain
The Delights of the Garden	Las delicias del jardín	Fernando Colomo	Spain
The Designer Is Dead		Gonzalo Hergueta	Spain; United States
8		Julio Medem	Spain
The Writer: Almudena Grandes	Almudena	Azucena Rodríguez	Spain
Samana Sunrise	Amanece en Samaná	Rafa Cortés	Spain; Dominican Republic
White Roses, Fall!	¡Caigan las rosas blancas!	Albertina Carri	Argentina; Brazil; Spain
Close to the Sultan	En la alcoba del sultán	Javier Rebollo	Spain; France; Tunisia
Silent Struggle	En silencio	Sara Sálamo	Spain
Fragments	Fragmentos	Horacio Alcalá	Spain
The Imminent Age	L'edat imminent	Col·lectiu Vigília	Spain
The Good Manners	La buena letra	Celia Rico Clavellino	Spain
Fury	La furia	Gemma Blasco	Spain
Undercover	La infiltrada	Arantxa Echevarría	Spain
The Black Land	La terra negra	Alberto Morais	Spain; Panama
The Exiles	Los Tortuga	Belén Funes	Spain; Chile
My Friend Eva	Mi amiga Eva	Cesc Gay	Spain
Queen of Coal	Miss Carbón	Agustina Macri	Spain; Argentina
Away	Molt lluny	Gerard Oms	Spain; Netherlands
The Story of Us	Nosotros	Helena Taberna	Spain
Romería		Carla Simón	Spain
San Simón		Miguel Ángel Delgado	Spain; Portugal
Sirāt		Oliver Laxe	Spain; France
Deaf	Sorda	Eva Libertad	Spain
The Sleeper. The Lost Caravaggio	The Sleeper. El Caravaggio Perdido	Álvaro Longoria	Spain; Italy
Everything I Don't Know	Todo lo que no sé	Ana Lambarri Tellaeche	Spain
A Free Man	Un hombre libre	Laura Hojman	Spain
The Portuguese House	Una quinta portuguesa	Avelina Prat	Spain; Portugal

=== RTVE Galas ===
RTVE will hold presentation galas for the following films:

English title	Original title	Director(s)	Production countrie(s)
The Dinner	La cena	Manuel Gómez Pereira	Spain; France
The Gentleman	Ya no quedan junglas	Luis Gabriel Beristáin	Spain; Mexico
Hidden Murder	Parecido a un asesinato	Antonio Hernández	Spain; Argentina
The Truce	La tregua	Miguel Ángel Vivas	Spain; Kazakhstan

=== Klasikoak ===
The 'Klasikoak' section includes the following films:

English title	Original title	Director(s)	Production countrie(s)
Poachers (1975)	Furtivos	José Luis Borau	Spain
Midaq Alley (1994)	El callejón de los milagros	Jorge Fons	Mexico
Aniki-Bóbó (1942)		Manoel de Oliveira	Portugal
Un revenant (1946)		Christian-Jaque	France
Barry Lyndon (1975)		Stanley Kubrick	United Kingdom
The Family Game (1983)	家族ゲーム	Yoshimitsu Morita	Japan
Dressed in Blue (1983)	Vestida de azul	Antonio Giménez-Rico	Spain
Ehun metro (1985)		Alfonso Ungría	Spain
Hamaseigarrenean aidanez (1985)		Anjel Lertxundi	Spain
Zergatik panpox (1985)		Xabier Elorriaga	Spain
Oraingoz izen gabe (1986)		José Julián Bakedano	Spain

=== Surprise film ===
The following title was programmed as a surprise film:

English title	Original title	Director(s)	Production countrie(s)
Frankenstein		Guillermo del Toro	United States

== Awards ==
=== Official selection jury awards ===
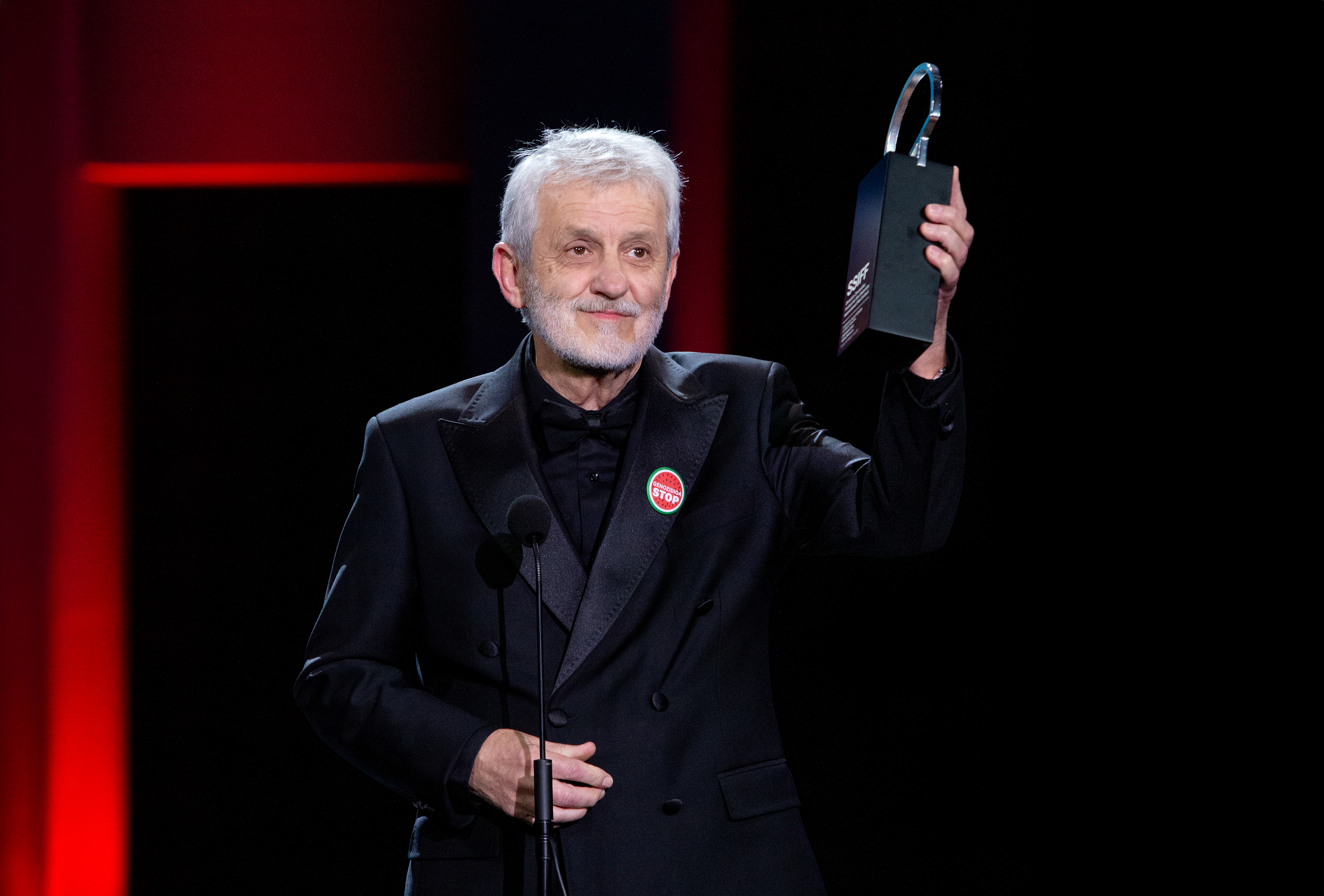
Jose Ramon Soroiz holding the Silver Shell for Best Leading Performance

The official selection jury awards are listed as follows:

- Golden Shell: Sundays
- Special Jury Prize: Good Valley Stories
- Silver Shell for Best Director: Joachim Lafosse (Six Days in Spring)
- Silver Shell for Best Leading Performance: Zhao Xiaohong (Her Heart Beats in Its Cage) & Jose Ramon Soroiz (Maspalomas)
- Silver Shell for Best Supporting Performance: Camila Pláate (Belén)
- Jury Prize for Best Cinematography: Pau Esteve Birba (Los Tigres)
- Jury Prize for Best Screenplay: Joachim Lafosse, Chloé Duponchelle, and Paul Ismael (Six Days in Spring)

=== Other official awards ===
- Kutxabank-New Directors Award: Weightless
  - Special Mention: Aro berria
- Horizontes Make & Mark Award: A Poet
  - Special Mention: The Ivy & A Loose End
- Zabaltegi-Tabakalera Award: The Ice Tower
  - Special Mentions: Two Times João Liberada & Blue Heron
- City of Donostia / San Sebastián Audience Award: The Voice of Hind Rajab
- City of Donostia / San Sebastián Audience Award for Best European Film: Little Amélie or the Character of Rain
- Nest Award: How to Listen to Fountains
  - Special Mention: The Old Bull Knows, Or Once Knew
- Irizar Basque Film Award: Sundays
  - Special Mention: The Last Rapture
- Dama Youth Award: The Mysterious Gaze of the Flamingo
- RTVE – Another Look Award: The Currents

=== Donostia honorific awards ===
- Donostia Award:
  - Esther García
  - Jennifer Lawrence

=== Non-official awards ===
- FIPRESCI Grand Prix: I'm Still Here (Walter Salles)
- FIPRESCI Award: Sundays
- Feroz Zinemaldia Award: Sundays
- SIGNIS Award: Sundays
- Sebastiane Award: Maspalomas
