= Six Days in Spring =

2025 film by Joachim Lafosse

- Theatrical release poster
- French: Six jours ce printemps-là
- Directed by: Joachim Lafosse
- Written by: Joachim Lafosse; Chloé Duponchelle; Paul Ismaël
- Produced by: Anton Iffland-Stettner; Eva Kuperman; Régine Vial; Alexis Dantec; Jani Thiltges; Hans Everaert
- Starring: Eye Haïdara; Jules Waring; Léonis Pinero Müller; Téodor Pinero Müller
- Cinematography: Jean-François Hensgens
- Edited by: Marie-Hélène Dozo
- Production companies: Stenola Productions; Les Films du Losange; Samsa Film; Menutto
- Distributed by: Cinéart (Belgium); Les Films du Losange (France); Samsa Film (Luxembourg)
- Release dates: 19 September 2025 (SSIFF); 12 November 2025 (France); 10 December 2025 (Belgium)
- Running time: 94 minutes
- Countries: Belgium; France; Luxembourg
- Language: French

Six Days in Spring (French: Six jours ce printemps-là) is a 2025 drama film directed by Joachim Lafosse, who co-wrote the screenplay with Chloé Duponchelle and Paul Ismaël. The film stars Eye Haïdara as a desperate woman who borrows her ex in-laws' house on the French Riviera to spend a short holiday with her children without telling them.

The film had its world premiere in the main competition of the 73rd San Sebastián International Film Festival on 19 September 2025, where it won Silver Shell for Best Director and Jury Prize for Best Screenplay.

== Cast ==
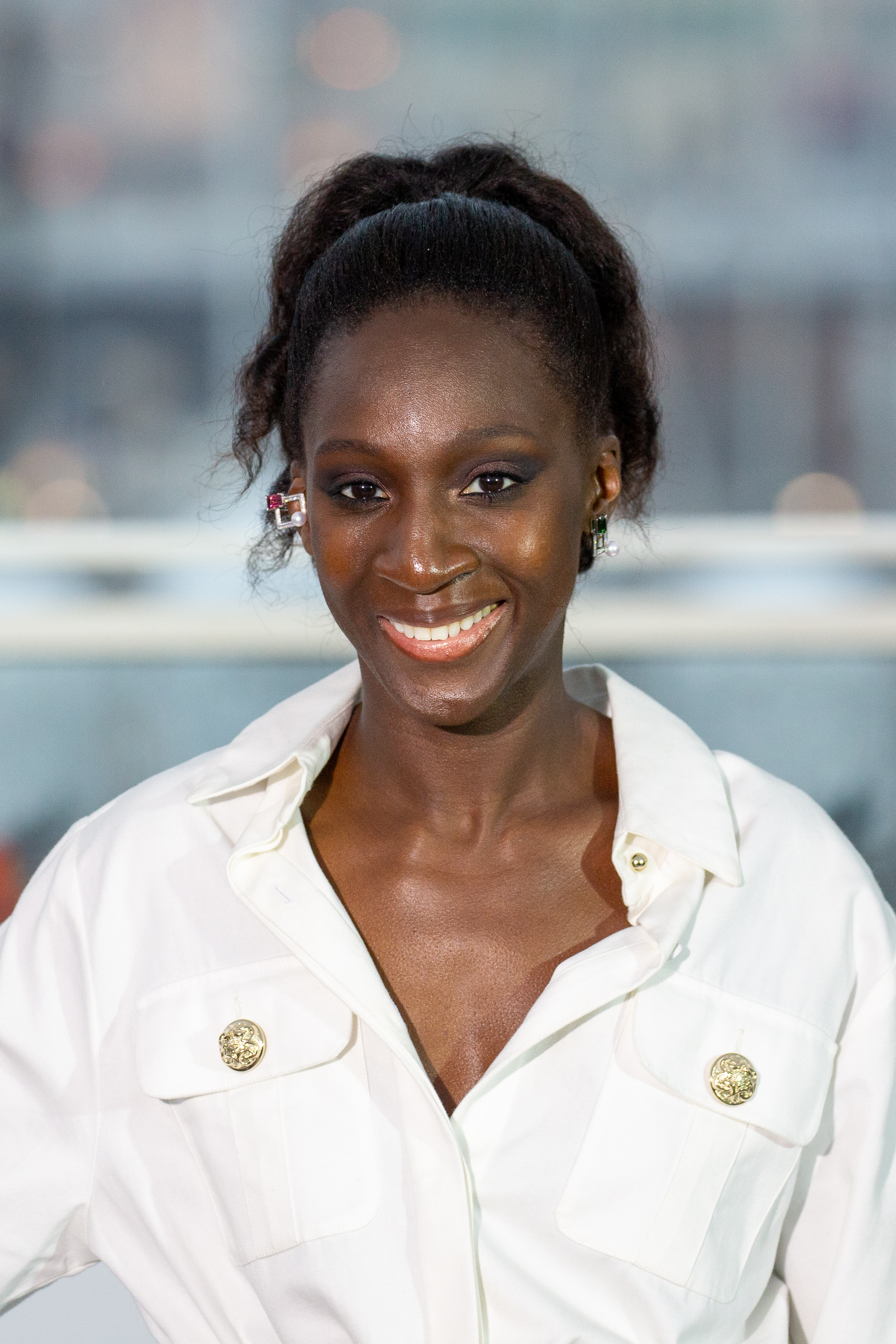
Eye Haïdara, protagonist of the film

- Eye Haïdara as Sana
- Jules Waringo as Jules
- Léonis Pinero Müller as twins
- Téodor Pinero Müller as twins
- Emmanuelle Devos as Josiane
- Damien Bonnard as Luc

== Production ==
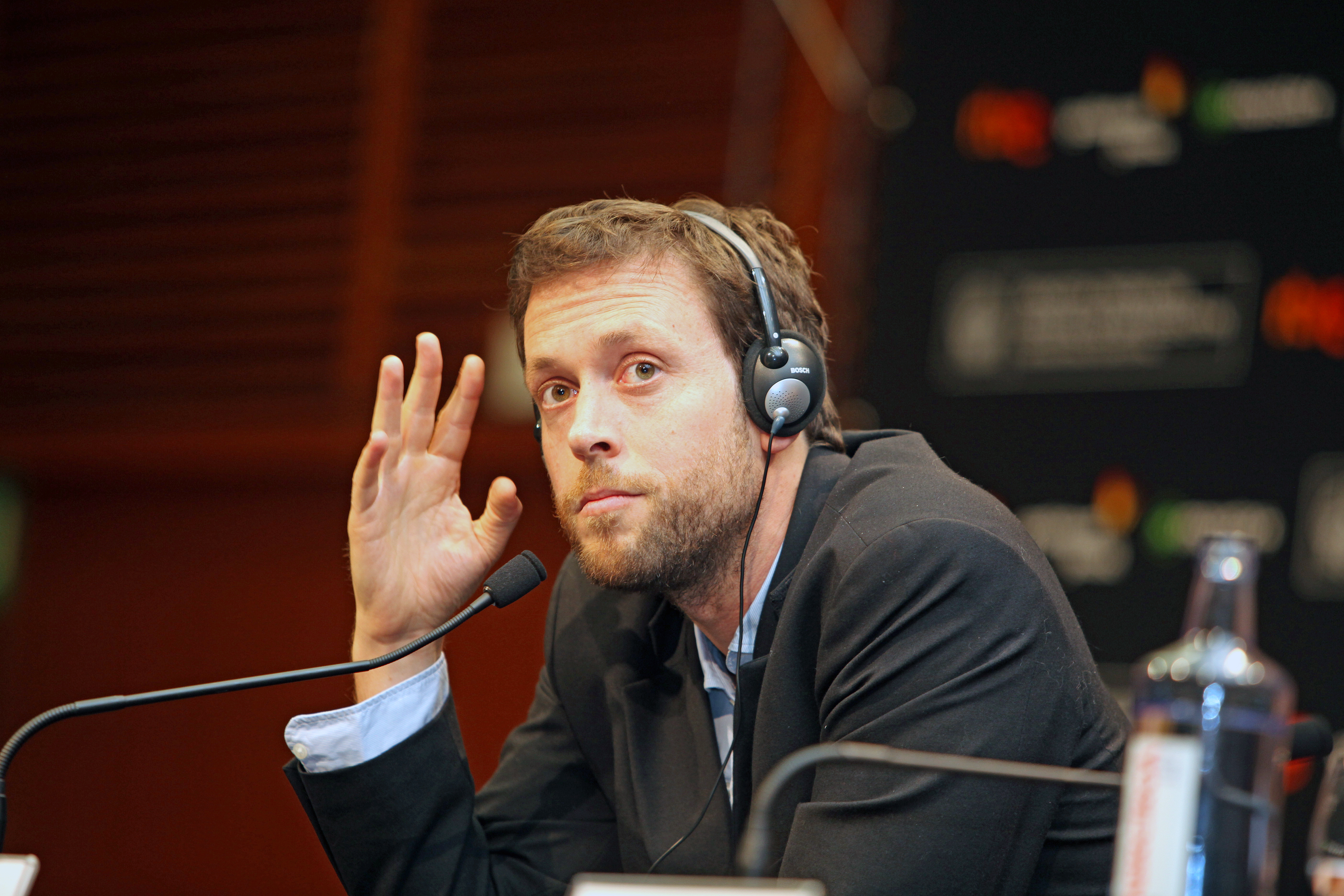
Joachim Lafosse, director of the film

In 2023, the film received advance on receipts from Centre national du cinéma et de l'image animée for the production funding. It also received the support in production funding from Wallonia-Brussels Federation Film and Audiovisual Centre in October 2023, before its filming later in Spring.

In March 2024, screen.brussels committed the support to film project from the Regional investment fund.

== Release ==
Six Days in Spring was selected to compete for the Golden Shell at the 73rd San Sebastián International Film Festival,where the film had its world premiere on 19 September 2025 and won two prizes. On 26 September 2025, it competed at the Odesa International Film Festival in European competition program.

It was also screened in International Perspective at the São Paulo International Film Festival on 17 October 2025.

The film competed in the 'Progressive Cinema Competition - Visions for the World of Tomorrow' section of the 20th Rome Film Festival on 19 October 2025.

It was released theatrically in France on 12 November 2025 by Les Films du Losange and in Belgium on 10 December 2025 by Cinéart.

== Reception ==
=== Critical response ===
Aurore Engelen of Cineuropa reviewing at the San Sebastián International Film Festival, praised the film for its characteristic alignment with Joachim Lafosse's cinematic style, notably his focus on familial alienation, intimate power dynamics, and emotionally charged enclosed settings. Engelen noted that while the film maintains a palpable tension, it "tends to avoid crisis point, despite it always seeming just around the corner," subtly subverting audience expectations through the risks taken by its protagonist, Sana. Engelen praised Eye Haïdara's performance for its precision and restraint, writing that she "treads along this razor edge with confidence" in a narrative built around "small nothings, avoided acts, faces turned away." The film's plot "allows room'" for broader social reflections, including "the assignment of social class, the illusion of social mobility and of changing social class, and the universal right to beauty," concluding in what Engelen describes as a "dogged determination to not allow the joy of gazing at the sea to be taken away."

=== Accolades ===
Award	Date of ceremony	Category	Recipient(s)	Result	Ref.
San Sebastián International Film Festival	27 September 2025	Golden Shell	Joachim Lafosse	Nominated	
San Sebastián International Film Festival	27 September 2025	Silver Shell for Best Director	Joachim Lafosse	Won	
San Sebastián International Film Festival	27 September 2025	Jury Prize for Best Screenplay	Joachim Lafosse, Chloé Duponchelle, and Paul Ismael	Won	
Odesa International Film Festival	4 October 2025	Best European Feature Film	Six Days in Spring	Won	
Rome Film Festival	26 October 2025	Best Film	Six Days in Spring	Nominated	
