= What Does That Nature Say to You =

2025 film by Hong Sang-soo

- Teaser poster
- Hangul: 그 자연이 네게 뭐라고 하니
- RR: Geu jayeoni nege mworago hani
- MR: Kŭ chayŏni nege mwŏrago hani
- Directed by: Hong Sang-soo
- Written by: Hong Sang-soo
- Produced by: Hong Sang-soo
- Starring: Ha Seong-guk; Kwon Hae-hyo; Cho Yun-hee; Kang So-yi; Park Mi-so
- Cinematography: Hong Sang-soo
- Edited by: Hong Sang-soo
- Music by: Hong Sang-soo
- Production company: Jeonwonsa Film Company
- Distributed by: Finecut
- Release dates: February 20, 2025 (Berlinale); May 14, 2025 (South Korea)
- Running time: 108 minutes
- Country: South Korea
- Language: Korean

What Does That Nature Say to You (Korean: 그 자연이 네게 뭐라고 하니) is a 2025 South Korean drama film, written and directed by Hong Sang-soo, starring Ha Seong-guk, Kwon Hae-hyo, Cho Yun-hee, Kang So-yi, and Park Mi-so.

The film was selected in the Competition at the 75th Berlin International Film Festival, where it competed for the Golden Bear and had first screening on February 20, 2025, at Berlinale Palast.

== Synopsis ==
A young poet takes his girlfriend to her parents' home and is stunned by its sublimity. He encounters her father, meets her mother and sister, and they all spend an extended day together, filled with lively conversation, delicious food, and drinks.

== Cast ==
- Ha Seong-guk as Ha Donghwa
- Kwon Hae-hyo as Kim Oryeong
- Cho Yun-hee as Choi Sunhee
- Kang So-yi as Kim Jun-hee
- Park Mi-so as Kim Neung-hee

== Release ==
What Does That Nature Say to You had its world premiere on February 20, 2025, as part of the 75th Berlin International Film Festival, in Competition.

The film featured at the 72nd Sydney Film Festival in the Features section on 5 June 2025. It was also part of Horizons section of the 59th Karlovy Vary International Film Festival, where it was screened from 4 July to 9 July 2025. It was also selected at the 8th Malaysia International Film Festival in A-Listers section and screened on July 27, 2025. It also made it to the Main Slate of 2025 New York Film Festival, where it had its North American Premiere on October 1, 2025.

In October, it was also screened in 'The Essentials' for its Quebec Premiere at the 2025 Festival du nouveau cinéma on 9 October 2025, and on 10 October 2025, it was showcased in Showcase section and spotlight on Korea at the 2025 Vancouver International Film Festival.

A week later, it was also screened in the 'Snapshots' section of the 61st Chicago International Film Festival on 17 October 2025.

It had its Singapore Premiere in the Horizon section of the 36th Singapore International Film Festival on 1 December 2025.

== Accolades ==
| Award | Date of ceremony | Category | Recipient | Result | Ref. |
|---|---|---|---|---|---|
| Berlin International Film Festival | 23 February 2025 | Golden Bear | What Does That Nature Say to You | Nominated | |
| Buil Film Awards | September 18, 2025 | Best Film | What Does That Nature Say to You | Nominated | |
