= The Condor Daughter =

2025 Bolivian drama film

- International promotional poster
- Spanish: La Hija Cóndor
- Directed by: Álvaro Olmos Torrico
- Screenplay by: Álvaro Olmos Torrico
- Produced by: Álvaro Olmos Torrico; Cecilia Sueiro Mosquera; Diego Sarmiento Pagán; Federico Moreira; Iris Sigalit Ocampo Gil
- Starring: María Magdalena Sanizo; Marisol Vallejos Montaño; Nely Huayta
- Cinematography: Nicolás Wong Díaz
- Edited by: Álvaro Olmos Torrico; Irene Cajías
- Music by: Cergio Prudencio; Marcelo Guerrero
- Production companies: Empatía Cinema; Ayara Producciones; La Mayor Cine
- Distributed by: Bendita Film Sales
- Release date: 7 September 2025 (TIFF)
- Running time: 109 minutes
- Countries: Bolivia; Peru; Uruguay
- Languages: Quechua; Spanish; English

The Condor Daughter (Spanish: La Hija Cóndor) is a 2025 drama film written and directed by Álvaro Olmos Torrico. A co-production of Bolivia, Peru, and Uruguay, it stars Nely Huayta, Marisol Vallejos Montaño and María Magdalena Sanizo.

The film had its world premiere on 7 September 2025 at the Centrepiece section of the 2025 Toronto International Film Festival.

It was selected as the Bolivian entry for the Best International Feature Film at the 99th Academy Awards.

== Synopsis ==
Clara is a bright, capable young woman living in Totorani, a small village high in the Bolivian Andes. Her adoptive mother, Ana, has carefully taught her the old midwife traditions, including gentle Quechua songs meant to guide babies safely into the world. Clara loves and respects this heritage, and everyone expects her to carry it forward. But deep inside, she longs to explore life beyond her village and hopes her beautiful singing voice might someday take her to the city and help her make a life of her own.

== Cast ==
- María Magdalena Sanizo as Clara
- Marisol Vallejos Montaño as Ana, the midwife
- Nely Huayta

== Production ==
In December 2024, the film project was presented at the Ventana Sur's Copia Final showcase in Montevideo, where it won four prizes, including a Cine+ Award.

== Release ==
The Condor Daughter had its world premiere in the Centrepiece at the 2025 Toronto International Film Festival on 7 September 2025. Subsequently it had its European premiere at Biarritz Film Festival on 21 September 2025, and was screened in Panorama at the 2025 Vancouver International Film Festival on 2 October 2025. It competed for Golden Hugo at the 61st Chicago International Film Festival on 18 October 2025.

The film was screened in the World Cinema Now section of the 37th Palm Springs International Film Festival on 7 January 2026, and on 27 January 2026, at the Gothenburg Film Festival in the International Competition.

The film competed at the 29th Málaga Film Festival on 11 March 2026, 'In competition'.

It was selected in the Ibero-American Feature Film section of the 41st Guadalajara International Film Festival, where it was screened in April 2026. On 2 May 2026, it was screened at the Lichter Filmfest Frankfurt International in International Feature Film Program, and on 10 May 2026, at the 2026 Seattle International Film Festival in Narrative features. It was also screened in Beyond the Childhood Horizon section of the Zlín Film Festival on 31 May 2026.

It also competed in the Latin American Fiction section of the 30th Lima Film Festival in August 2026, where it won Special Jury Prize and Honorable Mention from the Jury for Best Cinematography.

Spanish boutique world sales agency, Bendita Film Sales acquired the International sales rights of the film in August 2025, before its Toronto International Film Festival premiere.

It was theatrical released in France on 19 August 2026 and in Austria on 28 August 2026.

It was screened at the Laemmle Theatres, Royal Theatre in West Los Angeles and Glendale 5 in Glendale, California in September 2026.

== Reception ==
=== Critical response ===
On the AlloCiné, which lists 19 press reviews, the film obtained an average rating of 3.4/5.

=== Accolades ===
Award	Date of ceremony	Category	Recipient	Result	Ref.
Chicago International Film Festival	26 October 2025	Golden Hugo	The Condor Daughter	Nominated	
Málaga Spanish Film Festival	15 March 2026	Silver Biznaga for Best Supporting Actress	María Magdalena Sanizo	Won	
Málaga Spanish Film Festival	15 March 2026	Silver Biznaga for Best Music	Cergio Prudencio, Marcelo Guerrero	Won	
Guadalajara International Film Festival	25 April 2026	Best Performance	María Magdalena Sanizo	Won	
Lima Film Festival	15 August 2026	Special Jury Prize	The Condor Daughter	Won	
Lima Film Festival	15 August 2026	Honorable Mention from the Jury for Best Cinematography	Nicolás Wong Díaz	Won	

== See also ==
- List of submissions to the 99th Academy Awards for Best International Feature Film
- List of Bolivian submissions for the Academy Award for Best International Feature Film
