= Dracula (2025 Romanian film) =

2025 Romanian comedy drama film by Radu Jude

- Promotional poster
- Directed by: Radu Jude
- Screenplay by: Radu Jude
- Produced by: Alexandru Teodorescu; Rodrigo Teixiera
- Starring: Adonis Tanța; Gabriel Spahiu; Oana Mardare; Șerban Pavlu
- Cinematography: Marius Panduru
- Edited by: Cătălin Cristuțiu
- Music by: Wolfgang Frisch; Hervé Birolini; Matei Teodorescu
- Production companies: Saga Film; RT Features; Nabis Filmgroup; Paul Thiltges Distribution; Romanian National Film Center
- Distributed by: Independenţa Film (Romania)
- Release date: 10 August 2025 (Locarno)
- Running time: 170 minutes
- Countries: Romania; Austria; Luxembourg; Brazil
- Languages: Romanian; English; German
- Budget: €1.5 million
- Box office: $26,498

Dracula is a 2025 satirical comedy-drama film written and directed by Radu Jude. The film title is inspired by the 1897 Gothic horror novel Dracula by Irish author Bram Stoker. Set in contemporary Transylvania, it explores the legend of Dracula through Romanian lenses.

The film had its world premiere at the main competition of the 78th Locarno Film Festival on 10 August 2025, where it was nominated for Golden Leopard.

== Premise ==
In Romania, a theatre group performing a Dracula play turns to crime.

== Cast ==
- Adonis Tanța as Adonis
- Oana Maria Zaharia as Vampira/Worker
- Gabriel Spahiu as Sandu
- Ilinca Manolache
- Alexandru Dabija
- Andrada Balea
- Doru Talos
- Serban Pavlu
- Lukas Miko as Baron Wirth
- Alexandra Harapu
- Alina Șerban
- Karina Ziana Gherasim

== Production ==
Principal photography began on 7 July 2024 on locations in Transylvania, Romania. Made with a budget of €1.5 million, the project was shot over 29 days in various picturesque locations, including medieval fortresses in Sighişoara and Bucharest.

In an interview in Variety Jude said, "If Kontinental '25 is my answer to Roberto Rossellini, let’s say that Dracula is my love letter to Ed Wood" (referring to the American filmmaker, actor, and pulp novelist).

== Release ==
Dracula premiered at the 78th Locarno Film Festival on 10 August 2025, and competed for the Golden Leopard. It was also presented in the Icon section at the 30th Busan International Film Festival on 18 September 2025.

The film also made it to the Currents Selections of the 2025 New York Film Festival, where it had its New York Premiere on 2 October 2025. On 2 October 2025, it was presented in Altered States section of 2025 Vancouver International Film Festival. The film was screened at the Warsaw Film Festival in Encounters section on 10 October 2025. and in The Essentials for its Quebec Premiere at the 2025 Festival du nouveau cinéma on 13 October 2025.

On 16 October, it competed at the 58th Sitges Film Festival in the 'Oficial Fantàstic Competició' section, vying for the various awards given in the section.

It was also screened in the Spotlight Comedy section of the 61st Chicago International Film Festival, and in International Perspective at the São Paulo International Film Festival on 24 October 2025.

It will be screened in Survey Expanded: Fragilities at the Thessaloniki International Film Festival on 6 November 2025.

It was presented in the 'Best of Festivals' at the 29th Tallinn Black Nights Film Festival on 7 November 2025.

1-2 Special acquired North American rights to the film.

== Accolades ==
| Award | Date of ceremony | Category | Recipient | Result | Ref. |
|---|---|---|---|---|---|
| Locarno Film Festival | 16 August 2025 | Golden Leopard | Dracula | Nominated | |
| Locarno Film Festival | 16 August 2025 | Junior Jury Awards | Dracula | Second Prize | |
| Sitges Film Festival | 19 October 2025 | Best Feature Film | Dracula | Nominated | |
