= In the Rumbling Belly of Motherland =

- Directed by: Brishkay Ahmed
- Written by: Brishkay Ahmed
- Produced by: Brishkay Ahmed
- Starring: Najwa Alimi; Mahboby Fresta; Khalida Rasheed; Nazanin Sadid; Shogofa Sediqi
- Cinematography: Brishkay Ahmed; Fatima Tawakoli; Ali Hussein Husseini
- Edited by: Brishkay Ahmed
- Music by: Chris Hind
- Production company: ChitChat Productions
- Release date: May 15, 2021 (DOXA)
- Running time: 83 minutes
- Country: Canada
- Language: Dari

In the Rumbling Belly of Motherland is a Canadian documentary film, directed by Brishkay Ahmed and released in 2021. The film profiles Zan TV, a television station in Afghanistan which is run by a team of women journalists who face challenges being treated equally with their male counterparts in a highly sexist and oppressive society.

The film premiered at the 2021 DOXA Documentary Film Festival.

== Awards ==
The film won the awards for Outstanding Feature Film and Outstanding Feature Film Producer at the 2021 Reelworld Film Festival, and was shortlisted for the 2021 DGC Allan King Award for Best Documentary Film.
