= Good Valley Stories =

- Film poster
- Spanish: Historias del buen valle
- Directed by: José Luis Guerin
- Produced by: Javier Lafuente; Jonás Trueba; Gaëlle Jones; José Luis Guerin
- Cinematography: Alicia Almiñana
- Edited by: José Luis Guerin
- Music by: Anahit Simonian
- Production companies: Los Ilusos Films; Perspective Films
- Distributed by: Wanda Visión
- Release dates: 25 September 2025 (Zinemaldia); 6 February 2026 (Spain)
- Countries: Spain; France
- Languages: Arabic; Catalan; Spanish; French; Portuguese; Russian; Ukrainian

Good Valley Stories (Spanish: Historias del buen valle) is a 2025 documentary film directed by José Luis Guerin.

== Subject ==
The documentary depicts instances of daily life in the Barcelona neighborhood of Vallbona, isolated by the Besòs river, a road, a channel, and a commuter railway.

== Production ==
The film is a Spanish-French co-production by Los Ilusos Films and Perspective Films. The inception of the film concerns a commission by the MACBA to shoot an exhibition project about disadvantaged people in Barcelona.

== Release ==
Good Valley Stories was presented at the 73rd San Sebastián International Film Festival on 25 September 2025, in competition for the Golden Shell. Distributed by Wanda Visión, it is scheduled to be released theatrically in Spain on 6 February 2026.

== Reception ==
Jonathan Romney of ScreenDaily concluded his review stating that Guerin "doesn't romanticise its subject, and certainly shows the harsher aspects of how it must be to live in Vallbona – but does so vividly, with fascination, affection and respect".

Manuel J. Lombardo of Diario de Sevilla gave the film a 5-star rating, celebrating in style how, with the film, "cinema once again achieves that small miracle of exploration, recognition and empathy".

== See also ==
- List of Spanish films of 2026
