= Akashi (film) =

2025 Canadian drama film

- Film poster
- Directed by: Mayumi Yoshida
- Written by: Mayumi Yoshida
- Produced by: Nach Dudsdeemaytha; Tyler Hagan; Mayumi Yoshida
- Starring: Mayumi Yoshida; Hana Kino; Ryo Tajima; Kunio Murai
- Cinematography: Jaryl Lim
- Edited by: Nach Dudsdeemaytha
- Production companies: Experimental Forest Films; Crave; Hollywood Suite
- Distributed by: KinoSmith; Rabbit House
- Release date: October 5, 2025 (VIFF)
- Running time: 100 minutes
- Country: Canada
- Languages: Japanese; English

Akashi is a Canadian drama film. It was written, directed and starred Mayumi Yoshida, in her feature-length directorial debut, and produced by Yoshida, Nach Dudsdeemaytha and Tyler Hagan.

== Plot ==
Kana, a Japanese Canadian artist based in Vancouver returns home to Tokyo for the first time in ten years to attend the funeral of her grandmother; during the trip, she reconnects with her old boyfriend Hiro, and investigates a family secret about her grandfather that her grandmother had revealed before her death.

== Cast ==
- Mayumi Yoshida as Kana
- Hana Kino as Grandma
- Ryo Tajima as Hiro
- Kunio Murai as Grandpa
- Chieko Matsubara as Wakako
- Hiro Kanagawa as Cab Driver
- Rin Kusunose as Yumeko

== Production ==
Akashi was Yoshida's full-length directorial debut. The film was an expansion of her 2017 short film of the same title. It entered production in December 2023 in Tokyo, with some later location shooting in Vancouver.

== Release ==
The film premiered at the 2025 Vancouver International Film Festival, where it won the Audience Award for the Northern Lights program.

It screened in the Borsos Competition program at the 2025 Whistler Film Festival. It swept the awards at the Whistler Film Festival with Yoshida winning best actor, best B.C. director and the Haebler Award for best feature, alongside Hagan and Dudsdeemaytha. Additionally, Jaryl Lim won for best cinematography.

It was screened at the 2026 Canadian Film Festival, where it won both the juried award for Best Film and the People's Pick award.

The film has been acquired for commercial distribution by KinoSmith in Canada, and Rabbit House in Japan. Additional international distribution rights have been acquired by Canoe Film.
