= Winter of the Crow =

2025 film by Kasia Adamik

The Winter of the Crow
- Directed by: Kasia Adamik
- Screenplay by: Sandra Buchta
- Based on: "Professor Andrews Goes to Warsaw" by Olga Tokarczuk
- Produced by: Olga Chajdas; Stanislaw Dziedzic; Katarzyna Ozga; Nicolas Steil; Samantha Taylor
- Starring: Lesley Manville; Zofia Wichłacz; Andrzej Konopka; Sascha Ley; Tom Burke
- Cinematography: Tomasz Naumiuk
- Edited by: Andonis Trattos
- Music by: Emre Sevindik
- Production companies: Wild Mouse Production; Film Produkcja; Iris Productions & Film; Music Entertainment Ltd
- Distributed by: Signature Entertainment (United Kingdom)
- Release date: 6 September 2025 (TIFF)
- Running time: 112 minutes
- Countries: Poland; Luxembourg; United Kingdom
- Language: English

Winter of the Crow is a 2025 thriller film directed by Kasia Adamik and written by Sandra Buchta, based on the short story "Professor Andrews Goes to Warsaw" by Olga Tokarczuk. It stars Lesley Manville and Tom Burke.

The film premiered in the Platform Prize program at the 2025 Toronto International Film Festival on 6 September 2025.

== Premise ==
A visiting academic (Manville) is in Cold War-era Warsaw as the country enters martial law in 1981.

== Cast ==
- Lesley Manville as Dr Joan Andrews
- Tom Burke
- Zofia Wichłacz
- Andrzej Konopka

== Production ==
An adaptation of the 1998 short story "Professor Andrews Goes to Warsaw" by Olga Tokarczuk, the film production was announced in July 2020 with the title Winter of the Crow. Funding was received from the Polish Film Institute and was announced as a Polish, Swedish and German co-production. Kasia Adamik was set as director with Sandra Buchta adapting the screenplay. In 2022, additional funding was granted by the UK Global Screen Fund.

Principal photography took place in Luxembourg in late 2023. Filming took place in Bristol, England in January 2024, under the working title The Lecture with Lesley Manville and Tom Burke reportedly part of the cast. The cast also includes Zofia Wichłacz and Andrzej Konopka. Filming took place in Warsaw in January 2024. The film is produced by Olga Chajdas, Stanislaw Dziedzic, Katarzyna Ozga, Nicolas Steil, and Sam Taylor for production companies Wild Mouse Production, Film Produkcja, Iris Productions & Film and Music Entertainment Ltd.

== Release ==
Winter of the Crow closed the 73rd San Sebastián International Film Festival on 27 September 2025. It competed in the 'Progressive Cinema Competition - Visions for the World of Tomorrow' section of the 20th Rome Film Festival in October 2025 and in Reims Polar in April 2026.
