= Patricia Kingori =

British African sociologist

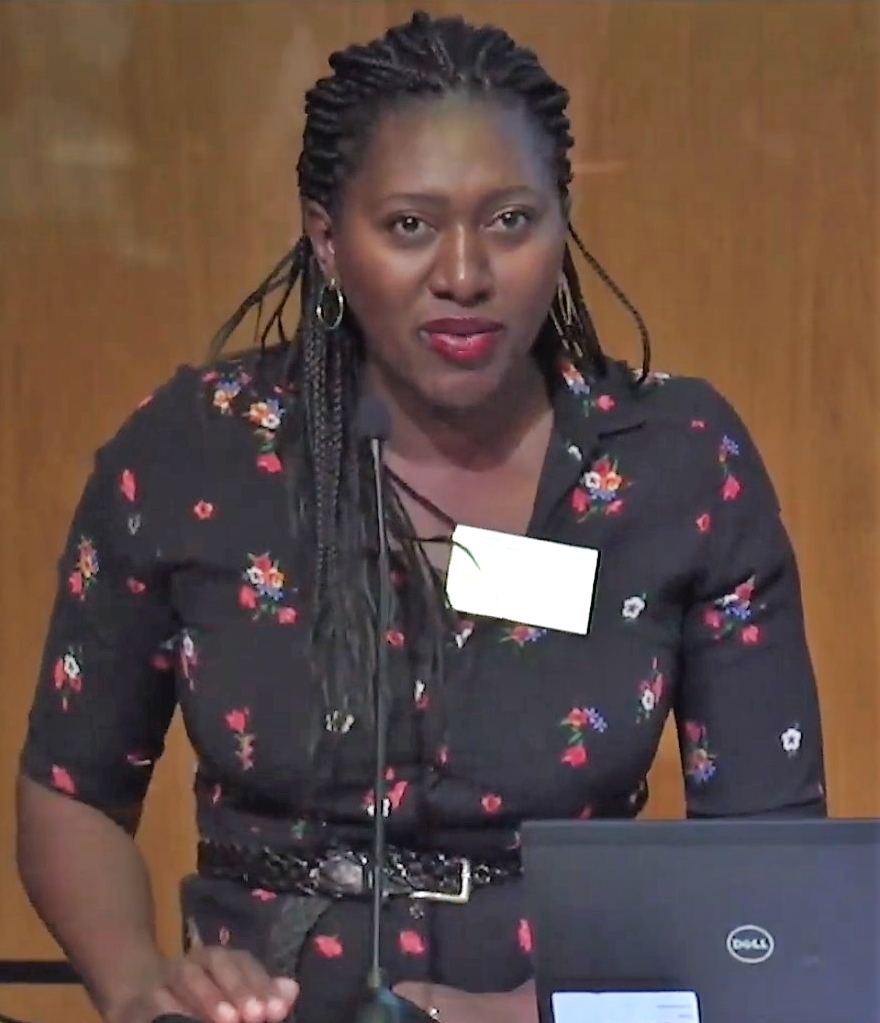
- Kingori speaks at the Research on Research Institute in 2019
- Born: Kenya
- Education: London School of Hygiene & Tropical Medicine; Royal Holloway, University of London
- Scientific career
- Workplaces: University of Oxford
- Thesis: "The good, the bad and the ethical" : a sociological examination of Kenyan fieldworkers' ethical perspectives and practices of medical research. (2012)

Patricia Kingori is a British Kenyan sociologist who is a Wellcome Senior Investigator and Professor at the University of Oxford. Her research considers the experiences of frontline health workers around the world. She is particularly interested in misinformation and pseudoscience. In 2015, Kingori was included on the Powerlist.

== Early life and education ==
Kingori was born in Kenya. As a child she moved to Saint Kitts in the Caribbean. She stayed in the Caribbean until she was a teenager, when she moved to London. Kingori was an undergraduate student at the Royal Holloway, University of London, where she studied sociology. After graduating she focused her doctoral research on the ethical challenges experienced by frontline workers. Kingori was awarded a Wellcome Doctoral Studentship and began her PhD at the London School of Hygiene & Tropical Medicine. After completing her doctoral research, Kingori moved to the multidisciplinary bioethics Ethox Centre at the University of Oxford where she continued studying the lives of frontline workers, comparing their experiences in The Gambia, Cambodia and Uganda. In December 2021, Kingori became the youngest black Oxbridge professor and one of the youngest women to ever be awarded a full professorship at the University of Oxford. She is Professor of Global Health Ethics at the Nuffield Department of Population Health, Wellcome Senior Investigator, and Senior Research Fellow at Somerville College.

== Research and career ==
Kingori was appointed to the faculty at the Ethox Centre shortly after completing her first postdoctoral position. Her research considers the sociology of science and medicine. She is particularly interested in the experiences and values of frontline staff, for example, those conducting clinical trials and treatment in Africa. Kingori has studied the origins and spread of pseudoscience and misinformation in global health. She presented her work on "fakes and facts" in a pandemic at the Science Gallery.

In 2021, Kingori became one of the youngest woman to be made a Full Professor at the University of Oxford. Several outlets incorrectly claimed that Patricia Kingori was 28 when she became a full professor at the University of Oxford. According to the official UK Companies House register, Patricia Kingori's date of birth is November 1977. She was appointed to a full professorship in December 2021, meaning she was 44, not 28, at the time. Somerville College's announcement describes her as “one of the youngest women to be awarded a full professorship in Oxford’s 925-year history and the youngest Black professor at Oxford or Cambridge,” but it does not state the age “28” or claim she is the first Black woman professor in all of Oxford's history.

=== Academic service ===
Kingori serves on the board of the Global Health Bioethics Network, the management team of the Wellcome Centre for Ethics and Humanities, and the Development Board of the Black Cultural Archives. At Oxford, Kingori is part of the Central University Research Ethics Committee. Kingori has appeared on Julia Gillard's podcast A Podcast of One's Own. She is a member of the Scientific Advisory Group for Emergencies Scientific Pandemic Insights Group on Behaviours, SAGE SPI-B, which is overseen by Ann John and Brooke Rogers, and provides information on how to help people adhere to interventions during global challenges such as the COVID-19 pandemic. She is a member of the COVID-19 Clinical Research Coalition.

== Selected publications ==
- Patricia Kingori (2013). "Experiencing everyday ethics in context: frontline data collectors perspectives and practices of bioethics". Social Science & Medicine. 98: 361–370. doi:10.1016/j.socscimed.2013.10.013. PMC 3898703. PMID 24210881. Wikidata Q35037745.
- Patricia Kingori; René Gerrets (2016). "Morals, morale and motivations in data fabrication: Medical research fieldworkers views and practices in two Sub-Saharan African contexts". Social Science & Medicine. 166: 150–159. doi:10.1016/j.socscimed.2016.08.019. PMC 5034849. PMID 27566044. Wikidata Q31123995.
- Patricia Kingori (2013). "Experiencing everyday ethics in context: frontline data collectors perspectives and practices of bioethics". Social Science & Medicine. 98: 361–370. doi:10.1016/j.socscimed.2013.10.013. PMC 3898703. PMID 24210881. Wikidata Q35037745.

== Documentary ==
Kingori is executive producer as well as a central figure of The Shadow Scholars, a 2024 documentary about the thriving "essay mill" industry in Kenya where educated Kenyans are producing academic papers for mostly Western students. The documentary follows Kingori to Nairobi and provides behind-the-scenes on the lives of some of these writers. The documentary is directed by Eloïse King with British film director Steve McQueen as an executive producer. It had its international premiere at International Documentary Film Festival Amsterdam (IDFA) in November 2024.

== Personal life ==
Kingori's sister, Vanessa Kingori, is Google's Managing Director of Technology, Media, and Telecoms.
