= Dance of the Living =

- Theatrical release poster
- Spanish: La lucha
- Directed by: José Alayón
- Screenplay by: Marina Alberti; Samuel M. Delgado
- Produced by: José Alayón; José M. Viña; Jamie Weiss; Jairo López; María Alejandra Mosquera; Carlos E. García
- Starring: Yazmina Estupiñán; Tomasín Padrón; Inés Cano; Sara Cano; Aridany Pérez
- Cinematography: Mauro Herce
- Edited by: Emma Tusell
- Music by: Camilo Sanabria; Adriana Galán
- Production companies: El Viaje Films; Blond Indian Films
- Distributed by: Sideral Cinema
- Release dates: 19 September 2025 (Zinemaldia); 30 January 2026 (Spain)
- Running time: 92 minutes
- Countries: Spain; Colombia
- Language: Spanish

Dance of the Living (Spanish: La lucha) is a 2025 drama film directed by José Alayón. Exploring the Canarian wrestling scene, it stars Yazmina Estupiñán and Tomasín Padrón in a father-daughter relationship. It is a Spanish-Colombian co-production.

== Plot ==
Set against the backdrop of Canarian wrestling in the island of Fuerteventura, the plot follows father Miguel and daughter Mariana (both wrestlers) as they try to moved forward after the death of her wife and mother Pilar, facing Miguel's knee injury and Mariana's rage.

== Cast ==
- Tomasín Padrón as Miguel
- Yazmina Estupiñán as Mariana
- Inés Cano as Inés

== Production ==
The film is a Spanish-Colombian co-production by El Viaje Films alongside Blond Indian Films, with backing from Creative Europe MEDIA, ICAA, the Government of the Canary Islands, Radio Televisión Canaria, and Cabildo de Tenerife.

== Release ==
Dance of the Living premiered in the 'New Directors' section of the 73rd San Sebastián International Film Festival in September 2025. The festival run also included selection for screenings at the São Paulo International Film Festival, the Toulouse Spanish Film Festival (Cinespaña), the Thessaloniki Film Festival, the Vancouver Film Festival, and the Bordeaux International Independent Film Festival. Mauro Herce worked as cinematographer and Emma Tusell as film editor.

Distributed by Sideral Cinema, it is scheduled to be released theatrically in Spain on 30 January 2026.

== Review ==
Cristóbal Soage of Cineuropa lauded how the film "crafts a deep, honest and achingly beautiful portrait of a unique place and the people who live there".

== See also ==
- List of Spanish films of 2026
