= If We Don't Burn, How Do We Light Up the Night =

2025 drama film by Kim Torres

- Spanish: Si no ardemos, cómo iluminar la noche
- Directed by: Kim Torres
- Written by: Kim Torres; Luisa Mora Fernández
- Produced by: Ale Vargas Carballo
- Cinematography: Mel Nocetti
- Edited by: Nicole Chi Amén; Omar Guzmán
- Music by: Delphine Malaussena
- Production companies: Noche Negra Producciones; Tropical Films; Les Films du Clan
- Release date: 22 September 2025 (SSIFF)
- Running time: 90 minutes
- Countries: Costa Rica; Mexico; France
- Language: Spanish

If We Don't Burn, How Do We Light Up the Night (Spanish: Si no ardemos, cómo iluminar la noche) is a 2025 coming of age drama film written and directed by Kim Torres, marking her feature directorial debut. A co-production of Costa Rica, Mexico, and France, it follows Laura, a thirteen-year-old girl who moves to a rural town in Costa Rica and slowly uncovers a dark secret tied to a string of disappeared women, one that the town has explained away through local folklore about a monster in the forest.

The film had its world premiere in the New Directors section of the 73rd San Sebastián International Film Festival on 22 September 2025. It was selected as the Costa Rican entry for the Best International Feature Film at the 99th Academy Awards.

== Plot ==
Laura, a thirteen year old girl, moves from San José to a small town in the Costa Rican countryside surrounded by forests and palm plantations, after her mother begins a relationship with a widower who lives there. As Laura settles into her new life, she becomes close with Daniela, a local girl her own age, and hears about a legend involving a creature said to attack women in the surrounding forest. Several women from the town have disappeared over the years, and the community regularly gathers to pray for their return. When Daniela herself goes missing, Laura begins to suspect that what is happening in the town has less to do with a supernatural threat and more to do with violence carried out by the men around her.

== Cast ==
- Lara Yuja Mora as Laura
- Keylin Delgado Arguedas as Daniela
- Valentina Chaves Jimenez as Gabi
- Teresa Sánchez as Gloria
- Michelle Jones as Miriam, Laura's mother
- Juan Luis Araya
- Jose Gabriel Guzmán Rodríguez as Esteban
- Luis Carlos Canhoto Baptista da Silva as Bruno
- Sebastián Sánchez Soza

== Production ==
The screenplay was written by Kim Torres together with Luisa Mora Fernández. Torres has said the story is rooted in her own childhood, though not directly autobiographical, and the film was shot with a cast made up mostly of non professional actors, including its three young leads, who were found through a casting process led by casting director and acting coach Kim Picado. Development took more than five years, a stretch that included the COVID-19 pandemic, and the project passed through the industry labs WIP Latam and Proyecta before going into production.

Cinematography is led by Mel Nocetti, with editing by Nicole Chi Amén and Omar Guzmán, music by Delphine Malaussena, and sound by Thomas Becka. The film was produced by Alejandra Vargas Carballo of the Costa Rican company Noche Negra Producciones, in co-production with Mariana Monroy of Tropical Films in Mexico and Camille Ferrero, Lucile Ric, and Charles Philippe of Les Films du Clan in France, with international sales handled by Urban Sales in France.

If We Don't Burn, How Do We Light Up the Night is Torres's first feature. She had previously directed the short films Luz Nocturna (Night Light, 2022), which competed for the Short Film Palme d'Or at the 2022 Cannes Film Festival and became the first Costa Rican film to do so, and Solo la luna comprenderá (2023), which screened at the Locarno Film Festival.

== Release ==
The film had its world premiere on September 22, 2025, in the New Directors section of the 73rd San Sebastián International Film Festival, with a run time of 90 minutes. It later screened in the Cine en los Barrios competition at the Cartagena International Film Festival (FICCI) in Colombia.

== Reception ==
Writing for The Film Verdict, Lucy Virgen described the film as a sober and sensitive coming of age story, noting that Torres avoided the over explanation and didactic tone common in first features dealing with domestic violence, favoring a restrained visual style without a heavy score or fast editing. In desistfilm, Laura Arias wrote that the film addresses gender based violence indirectly, through glances, silences, and a blend of local folklore with social commentary, rather than through explicit depiction.

== See also ==
- List of submissions to the 99th Academy Awards for Best International Feature Film
- List of Costa Rican submissions for the Academy Award for Best International Feature Film
