= Brishkay Ahmed =

Afghan Canadian documentary filmmaker

Brishkay Ahmed is an Afghan Canadian documentary filmmaker based in Vancouver, British Columbia. She is most noted for her films In the Rumbling Belly of Motherland and In the Room.

She began her career in 2010 with the documentary film Reclaiming Rights, and followed up in 2012 with The Story of Burqa: Case of a Confused Afghan.

== Filmography ==
- Reclaiming Rights - 2010
- The Story of Burqa: Case of a Confused Afghan - 2012
- Unveiled: The Kohistan Video Scandal - 2016
- Aryana Resurrected - 2018
- In the Rumbling Belly of Motherland - 2021
- Fatima in Kabul - 2021
- Boutique - 2025
- In the Room - 2025
- Have You Heard Judi Singh? - 2025, producer

== Awards ==
Award	Date of ceremony	Category	Work	Result	Ref.
Reelworld Film Festival	2021	Outstanding Feature Film	In the Rumbling Belly of Motherland	Won	
Reelworld Film Festival	2021	Outstanding Feature Film Producer	In the Rumbling Belly of Motherland	Won	
Directors Guild of Canada	2021	DGC Allan King Award for Best Documentary Film	In the Rumbling Belly of Motherland	Nominated	
Canadian Screen Awards	2022	Best Web Program or Series, Nonfiction	Fatima in Kabul	Nominated	
Vancouver International Film Festival	2025	Audience Choice Award, Showcase	In the Room	Won	
