= Reedland =

- Theatrical release poster
- Directed by: Sven Bresser
- Written by: Sven Bresser
- Produced by: Marleen Slot
- Starring: Gerrit Knobbe; Loïs Reinders
- Cinematography: Sam du Pon
- Edited by: Lot Rossmark
- Music by: Lyckle de Jong; Mitchel van Dinther
- Production companies: A Private View; BNP Paribas Fortis Film Fund; Belgian Tax Shelter; Cobo; Eurimages; Netherlands Film Production Incentive; VPRO; Viking Film
- Distributed by: Cinéart
- Release dates: May 14, 2025 (Cannes); October 9, 2025 (Netherlands)
- Running time: 105 minutes
- Countries: Netherlands; Belgium
- Language: Dutch

Reedland (Dutch: Rietland) is a 2025 drama film written and directed by Sven Bresser, in his directorial debut. Starring Gerrit Knobbe and Loïs Reinders, it follows a reed cutter who finds a girl's corpse on his land.

The film had its world premiere in the Critics' Week section of the 2025 Cannes Film Festival on 14 May, and was theatrically released in the Netherlands in 9 October. It was selected as Dutch entry in Best International Feature Film category for the 98th Academy Awards, but it was not nominated.

== Synopsis ==
Johan is a reed cutter who, after finding the lifeless body of a little girl on his land, is overcome with a vague sense of guilt. As he cares for his granddaughter, he becomes increasingly obsessed with finding answers and unraveling the evil lurking in his close-knit rural community.

== Cast ==
- Gerrit Knobbe as Johan
- Loïs Reinders as Dana
- Anna Loeffen as Aleida
- Lola van Zoggel as Village kid
- Yannick Zoet as Casper

== Release ==
The film had its world premiere on May 14, 2025, at the 78th Cannes Film Festival, then screened on August 8, 2025, at the New Zealand International Film Festival, on September 18, 2025, at the 30th Busan International Film Festival, on October 3, 2025, at the Netherlands Film Festival, and on October 17, 2025, at the 61st Chicago International Film Festival.

The film was released on October 9, 2025, in Dutch theaters.

== Reception ==
On review aggregator website Rotten Tomatoes, the film holds an approval rating of 83% based on 12 reviews, with an average rating of 6.4/10.

== Accolades ==
Award / Festival	Ceremony date	Category	Recipient(s)	Result	Ref.
Cannes Film Festival	24 May 2025	Critics' Week Grand Prix	Sven Bresser	Nominated	
Cannes Film Festival	24 May 2025	Caméra d'Or	Sven Bresser	Nominated	
Chicago International Film Festival	26 October 2025	New Directors Competition - Gold Hugo	Reedland	Pending	
Adelaide Film Festival	27 October 2025	Feature Fiction Award	Reedland	Special mention	

== See also ==
- List of submissions to the 98th Academy Awards for Best International Feature Film
- List of Dutch submissions for the Academy Award for Best International Feature Film
