= In the Room (2025 film) =

- Directed by: Brishkay Ahmed
- Screenplay by: Brishkay Ahmed
- Produced by: Teri Snelgrove
- Starring: Mozhdah Jamalzadah; Vida Samadzai; Nelofer Pazira
- Cinematography: Diana Parry
- Edited by: Jessica Dymond
- Music by: Zhovan Zoleikhapour
- Production company: National Film Board of Canada
- Release date: October 7, 2025 (VIFF)
- Running time: 76 minutes
- Country: Canada
- Languages: English; Dari; Farsi

In the Room is a Canadian documentary film, directed by Brishkay Ahmed and released in 2025. An exploration of her own Afghan Canadian heritage, the film documents her journey from being an immigrant who wanted to disassociate herself from Afghan culture in her youth to fit into Canadian society, toward developing a new appreciation for and pride in her heritage by learning from the strength and resilience of other Afghan women living in North America, including singer Mozhdah Jamalzadah, beauty pageant competitor Vida Samadzai, and filmmaker and journalist Nelofer Pazira.

The film premiered on October 7, 2025, at the 2025 Vancouver International Film Festival, where it won the Audience Choice award for the Showcase program.

It subsequently screened at the Reelworld Film Festival on October 19.
