= Mayumi Yoshida (Canadian actress) =

Canadian actress and filmmaker

Mayumi Yoshida is a Canadian actress and filmmaker based in Vancouver, British Columbia, whose full-length directorial debut film Akashi was released in 2025.

Born in Tokyo, Japan, she grew up in various locations around the world as the daughter of a journalist, before settling in Vancouver as a young adult. Akashi was first presented as a theatrical play at the 2016 Vancouver Fringe Festival, before a short film version was released in 2017 as her filmmaking debut.

In 2023, her video for Amanda Sum's "Different Than Before" earned a Juno Award nomination for Video of the Year at the Juno Awards of 2023, and was shortlisted for the Prism Prize. The video also won an award in the Music Video competition at the 2023 South by Southwest Film & TV Festival.

The feature film version of Akashi premiered at the 2025 Vancouver International Film Festival, where it won the Audience Award for the Northern Lights program. It later screened in the Borsos Competition program at the 2025 Whistler Film Festival, where it won several awards including best film in the Borsos Competition, the Haebler Award for overall best film in the festival program, and best performance and best director nods for Yoshida.

In 2026 she had a supporting acting role in the drama film Send the Rain.
