= The Shadow Scholars =

2024 film

- Directed by: Eloise King
- Produced by: Tabitha Breese; Eloise King; Bona Orakwue; Anna Smith Tenser
- Production companies: Film4; Doc Society; Lammas Park
- Release date: 2024 (BFI London Film Festival)
- Running time: 97 mins
- Country: United Kingdom
- Languages: English, Swahili

The Shadow Scholars is a 2024 documentary film about Kenya's academic ghostwriter-for-hire industry.

== Synopsis ==
The Shadow Scholars investigates the global, multi-billion dollar industry of academic ghostwriting, where highly educated but underemployed Kenyans write essays and theses for students worldwide. Following Oxford professor Patricia Kingori, the film uncovers this hidden economy, revealing the profound consequences of outsourced education for both the underpaid Kenyan writers, who support themselves with this work, and for the students and institutions that benefit from it.

== Cast ==
- Patricia Kingori

== Release ==
In 2024, The Shadow Scholars had its world premiere at the BFI London Film Festival and its international premiere at the International Documentary Film Festival Amsterdam. In the UK it is scheduled for cinema release from 16 September 2025 and aired on Channel 4 on 24 September.
