= Two Times João Liberada =

- Portuguese: Duas vezes João Liberada
- Directed by: Paula Tomás Marques
- Written by: June João; Paula Tomás Marques
- Produced by: Paula Tomás Marques; Cristiana Cruz Forte
- Starring: June João; André Tecedeiro; Jenny Larrue; Caio Amado; Tiago Aires Lêdo; Eloísa d'Ancensão; Alice Azevedo
- Cinematography: Fresco Mafalda
- Edited by: Jorge Jácome
- Music by: Maria João Petrucci; Rodrigo Vaiapraia
- Distributed by: Portugal Film - Portuguese Film Agency
- Release date: February 18, 2025 (Berlin)
- Running time: 70 minutes
- Country: Portugal
- Language: Portuguese

Two Times João Liberada (Portuguese: Duas vezes João Liberada) is a film directed by Paula Tomás Marques. The film follows actress João (June João) during the production of a biopic about João Liberada, a historical figure who was persecuted by the Inquisition. The film premiered in February 2025 at the Berlin International Film Festival, followed by its national premiere in Portugal at the beginning of May 2025 at IndieLisboa. In the United States, the film had its festival premiere at New Directors/New Films at the Museum of Modern Art in New York.

== Plot ==
In present-day Lisbon, João is an actress who was cast to play the lead role in a biopic about a gender non-conforming person named João Liberada, who was persecuted by the Inquisition in 18th-century Portugal. Although the director of the biopic seems to have a penchant for portraying violence and suffering onscreen, Liberada's story is ultimately one of strength, resilience, and rebellion against established gender roles. João and the director increasingly clash over the question of how Liberada's legacy should be portrayed. When João is haunted by the ghost of Liberada in her dreams, the tensions intensify. The director then suffers a mysterious paralysis, leaving him unable to finish the film. João sees this as an opportunity to take control of the production together with the crew and redirect the portrayal of Liberada's story.

== Production ==
The film was directed by Paula Tomás Marques, who also wrote the screenplay together with June João. The Portuguese filmmaker and teacher lives between Lisbon and Porto. Marques studied directing and cinematography at the Escola Superior de Teatro e Cinema in Lisbon, then sociology, and later at the Elías Querejeta Zine Eskola in San Sebastián. Her previous short films have dealt with gender, sexuality, and historiography, in which June João was involved in various capacities.

Although João Liberada is a fictional character, they were created based on 17th and 18th century trial recordings of the Inquisition pursuing gender dissidents. Therefore, the performance of João Liberada, is by co-writer and actor June João. Portuguese poet and LGBT activist André Tecedeiro plays the film's director.

The cinematographer, Fresco Mafalda, shot the film on 16mm film.

The score was created by Maria João Petrucci and Rodrigo Vaiapraia.

== Release ==
The premiere of Two Times João Liberada was on 18 February 2025 at the Berlin International Film Festival in the section Perspectives. The film was also included in the festival's Teddy Award program. In April 2025, the film was shown in the New Directors/New Films Festival, a joint film festival of the New York Museum of Modern Art and the Film Society of Lincoln Center. In May 2025, it was screened at Crossing Europe, IndieLisboa and XPOSED Queer Film Festival Berlin.

== Reception ==
=== Reviews ===
Teresa Vieira wrote in her review for the online film magazine Cineuropa that the film expresses criticism and self-criticism, analysis and self-analysis of the power of images, the effect of representation and the importance of listening. According to Vieira, Two Times João Liberada is also a film about cinema itself, depicting the making of a film with honesty and warmth, inviting a collective reflection to find out what cinema can and should be, every day and with every film.

=== Awards and honors ===
Crossing Europe 2025

- Fiction Competition nomination (Paula Tomás Marques)

IndieLisboa 2025

- National Competition nomination
- Best Feature Film Directing Award

75th Berlin International Film Festival 2025

- Best Fiction Film Debut nomination in the section Perspectives (Paula Tomás Marques)
- In competition for the Teddy Award

Taipei Film Festival 2025

- Jury's Special Award

San Sebastián International Film Festival 2025

- Zabaltegi-Tabakalera Award - 'Coup de Coeur'
