= Nadir Sarıbacak =

Turkish actor and filmmaker

- Born: September 14, 1977 (age 49); Ankara, Turkey
- Education: Çanakkale Onsekiz Mart University(BA), Bahçeşehir University(MA)
- Occupations: Actor, filmmaker
- Years active: 2001–present
- Awards: International Istanbul Film Festival (2009); Adana Golden Boll Film Festival (2009 and 2015); Antalya Golden Orange Film Festival (2015); Turkish Film Critics Association (2015)

Nadir Sarıbacak (born 14 September 1977) is a Turkish actor and filmmaker currently residing in the United States. He is known for his performances in Wrong Rosary (2009), Winter Sleep (2014), and Ivy (2015), as well as for his directorial debut Gazelle (2025).

== Career ==
Sarıbacak began his acting career in theatre before transitioning to film and television in the early 2000s.

He gained national attention with his leading role in Wrong Rosary (Uzak İhtimal, 2009), which won the Tiger Award at the International Film Festival Rotterdam. His performance was widely praised for its understated emotional depth. He later appeared in Toll Booth (2010) and in Nuri Bilge Ceylan’s Palme d’Or–winning Winter Sleep (2014).

In 2015, he won the award for Best Actor at the 49th Antalya Golden Orange Film Festival for his work in Tolga Karaçelik’s Ivy (Sarmaşık). In his acceptance speech, Sarıbacak expressed solidarity with all those involved in the making of the film, irrespective of nationality. This was perceived by the television broadcasting channel as an indirect criticism of government policies, and his speech was censored.

The incident was also noted internationally. Time reported that his speech was cut off by the pro-government broadcaster after he stated, “I am concerned about my country.”

He later starred in Leylak (2021), which premiered at the Tribeca Film Festival and received a Special Jury Mention for Best Narrative Short.

In 2025, Sarıbacak made his directorial debut with Gazelle, co-directed with Samy Pioneer. The film premiered in the Vanguard section of the Vancouver International Film Festival and later screened at the Chicago International Film Festival. The film also had its East Coast premiere at the Dances With Films New York festival.

== Themes and ideas ==
In an interview discussing censorship in contemporary Turkey, Sarıbacak remarked, “We live in a state in which we fear words.”

Speaking about his craft, he has described acting as “carefully removing each layer of a character,” and admitted that success sometimes frightens him because “as I succeed, I feel I lose the chance to make mistakes … sometimes this scares me very much.”

Directors have praised his minimalism and authenticity. On Leylak, collaborators noted that “less is more; his body language and actions are stronger than words. His performances radiate such realism you hold your breath.”

As a filmmaker, he has framed Gazelle as a psychological drama of separation, resilience, and the fragile terrain of the human mind, drawing directly from lived experiences of exile and displacement. The Vancouver International Film Festival described the film as “a raw and timely record of the profound distress of displacement.”

== Personal life ==
Sarıbacak was born in Ankara. He received his bachelor's degree in Turkish Language Teaching from Çanakkale Onsekiz Mart University in 2000. Before pursuing acting full-time, he worked as a teacher to satisfy family expectations, then resigned and enrolled at Akademi İstanbul to study acting. He later completed the Advanced Acting Master Program at Bahçeşehir University in 2006. He relocated to New Jersey, where he continues to live and work.

== Selected filmography ==
=== Film ===
Year	Title	Role	Notes
2006	Killing the Shadows	Çuvalcı	
2009	Wrong Rosary	Musa	Feature debut
2009	Kosmos	3rd Villager	
2010	Toll Booth (Gişe Memuru)	Hüseyin	
2010	Rapunzel	Boy	Short film
2012	Load (Yük)	Cemal	
2013	Thou Gild’st the Even (Sen Aydınlatırsın Geceyi)	Samim	
2013	Yozgat Blues	Kamil	
2014	Winter Sleep (Kış Uykusu)	Öğretmen Levent	Palme d’Or winner
2015	Ivy (Sarmaşık)	Cenk	Antalya Golden Orange – Best Actor
2021	Leylak	Yusuf Çelik	Short film
2024	Psycho Therapy: The Shallow Tale of a Writer Who Decided to Write About a Serial Killer	Llama Man	
2025	Gazelle	Yakup	Also co-director

=== Television ===
Year	Title	Role	Episodes
2007	Ç.Ö.T.: Çok Özel Tim	Erkek Spiker	1
2007	Senden Başka	Eczacı	1
2010–2011	Gönülçelen	Kobra	56
2011	İstanbul'un Altınları	Fahri Altın	16
2012–2013	Şubat	Duble (Double)	32
2013	Leyla and Mecnun	Organ Mafyası	1
2013	Aldırma Gönül	—	9
2013–2014	I Miss You Too (Özledim Seni)	İsimsiz	5
2014	Bana Artık Hicran De	Nazif	4
2015	Five Brothers (Beş Kardeş)	Nazım	13
2015–2016	Magnificent Century: Kösem	Bülbül Ağa	30
