= List of Malaysian films of 2018 =

This is a list of Malaysian films produced and released in 2018. Most of these films are produced in the Malay language, but there also a significant number of them that are produced in English, Mandarin, Cantonese and Tamil.

== 2018 ==
=== January – March ===
Opening		Title	Director	Cast	Genre	Notes	Ref.
J A N U A R Y	11	Busker	Kye Fariz	Hafeez Mikail, Daiyan Trisha, Anas Ridzuan, Bulan, Lia Natalia, Mas Khan	Romance	Astro Shaw	
J A N U A R Y	18	Best Story	Teddy Chin, JY Teng & Eden Wan	Jack Lim, Jack Yap, Eric Lin, Yoke Chen, Wayne Cai, Jane Ng	Drama	Lomo Pictures; Mandarin-language film	
J A N U A R Y	25	Bukan Cinta Malaikat	Aziz M. Osman	Nora Danish, Fachri Albar, Ashraf Muslim, Donita, Bonda Afida, Dynas Mokhtar	Romance	Ace Motion Production; Indonesia-Malaysia co-production	
F E B R U A R Y	1	Makrifat Cinta	Kamal G	Syamsul Yusof, Nora Danish, Nabila Huda, Adi Putra, Aznil Nawawi, Puteri Balqis, Sabrina Ali	Drama	Dhananwoodd Films	
F E B R U A R Y	15	Badang	Abdul Razak Mohaideen	Aliff Syukri, Fasha Sandha, Azhari Mohd Zain, Aminah Rhapor, Fauzi Nawawi, Fareez Fauzi	Action	FiTA Studios	
F E B R U A R Y	15	A House of Happiness	JY Teng	Richard Ng, Mimi Chu, Chan Fong, Cheryl Lee	Family	Lomo Pictures; Mandarin-language film	
F E B R U A R Y	22	Surf This Love: Gelora Juara	Waan Hafiz	Shukri Yahaya, Cristina Suzanne, Pekin Ibrahim, Josiah Hogan, Ardell Aryana	Comedy / Romance	Global Solution Resources	
F E B R U A R Y	22	Amazing Titanman	Eddie Tiger	Jaguar Lim, Namewee, Mehrdad Razavi Mozart, Azman Hassan	Comedy / Science Fiction	Jaguar Lim Films & Productions; Mandarin-language film	
M A R C H	1	Bidong The Boat People	Yusof Kelana	Taufik Hanafi, Irene Wong, Livonia Ricky, Zamree	Historical	YKS Film Maker	
M A R C H	8	KL Special Force	Syafiq Yusof	Syamsul Yusof, Rosyam Nor, Fattah Amin	Action	Viper Studios-Skop Production-Damofa Productions co-production	
M A R C H	8	Get Hard Tongkat Ali	Chan Wai Cheong	JC Chee, Juwei Teoh, Sarah Lian, Emily Kong, Elvis Chin	Comedy	Storideas; Mandarin-language film	
M A R C H	15	Lee Chong Wei: Rise Of The Legend	Teng Bee	Tosh Chan, Jake Eng, Ashley Hua, Rosyam Nor, Yeo Yann Yann, Mark Lee, Freddie Wong, Bernard Hiew	Drama / Sports	CB Pictures; Mandarin-language film	
M A R C H	15	33km From KL	K. S. Umaagaanthan	Ben G, Kavi Maran, Logeswaran, Ananthan Muniandy	Crime	KS Armada Megah; Tamil-language film	
M A R C H	22	Hantu Wangan	Ahmad Idham	Achey Bocey, Nur Risteena, Ruminah Sidek	Comedy	Aifa Motion Pictures	
M A R C H	29	Enjin No. 9	Raja Azmi	Kazar, Tajul Arif, Sharifah Shahira, Ayuni Asyiqin	Comedy	Rangkaian Melati Production	

=== April – June ===
Opening		Title	Director	Cast	Genre	Notes	Ref.
A P R I L	5	Dukun	Dain Said	Umie Aida, Faizal Hussein, Adlin Aman Ramlie, Namron, Sofi Jikan	Horror / Thriller	Astro Shaw	
A P R I L	19	Villavan	Vassan Kumaran	Vinod Mohan, Sangeeta Krishnasamy, Logan Nathan	Action	GVKM Elephant Pictures; Tamil-language film	
M A Y	10	Shun Pong O	David Thian Thor Wei	Shinny Tan, Kim Ho Won, Sherlyn Seo, Philip Keong, Phoebe Ooi, Jin Ju Hyung	Romance	DAA Production; Mandarin-language film	
M A Y	17	Sughamaai Subbulakshmi	Karthik Shamalan	Saresh D7, Punitah Shanmugam, Bagya Arivuckarasu, Kuben Mahadevan, G Crack Karnan	Romance	MA Productions House; Tamil-language film	
M A Y	24	Million Loves In Me	Sampson Yuen	John Y, Lo Koon Lan, Wilson Lee, Ruby Yap, Hiro Hayama	Drama	Full Billion Entertainment; Cantonese-language film	
J U N E	7	Impermanence Life	Lai Kim Koon	Loo Chin Mei, Jovean Yee, Lai Jiun Yong	Family	Cao Min Pictures; Mandarin-language film	
J U N E	14	Qhaliq	Rosli Mohd Taib	Hairul Azreen, Aliff Yasraff, Nur Risteena	Action	Aifa Motion Pictures	
J U N E	21	This Is Pilah	Rosdi Mat Dhali	Juzzthin, Zaidatul Iesna Mohd Raus, Kazar, Eliza Mustafa	Comedy	Madness Films	
J U N E	21	Blue Tears	Zhu Dan & Wang Jiang	Wong Yat Fei, Clara Wong, Xie Ming Yu	Historical	Global China Film; Mandarin-language film	
J U N E	28	Blok 404: Hidup Sampai Mati	Isma	Zamarul Hisham, Raja Azri, Nur Risteena, Amar Asyraf	Mystery	DBI Entertainment	
J U N E	28	Ghora	Devendran Arunasalam	G Crack Karnan, Mugen Rao, Yasmin Nadiah, Sara Baskin, Velarasan, Sathish Kumar	Horror	Algebra Films; Tamil-language film	

=== July – September ===
Opening		Title	Director	Cast	Genre	Notes	Ref.
J U L Y	5	Atcham Thavir	S. S. Vikneswaran & Karthik Shamalan	Gana, Uthaya, Geetha, Aanantha	Comedy	JPS Consultancy & Training; Tamil-language film	
J U L Y	19	Buyer Beware	Jeffrey Chiang	Carlos Chan, Bryant Mak, Carmen Soup	Horror	MM2 Entertainment; Cantonese-language film	
J U L Y	26	Vedigundu Pasangge	Vimala Perumal	Denes Kumar, Sangeeta Krishnasamy, Thangamani Velayudan, David Anthony, Seelan Manoheran	Action / Comedy	Veedu Production; Tamil-language film	
J U L Y	26	Pulang	Kabir Bhatia	Remy Ishak, Puteri Aishah Sulaiman, Azrel Ismail, Erwin Dawson, Juliana Evans	Biography / Drama / Historical	Primeworks Studios	
A U G U S T	9	Hantu Kak Limah	Mamat Khalid	Awie, Delimawati, Rab Khalid, TJ Isa, Sharwani, Zul Ariffin, Uqasha Senrose, Ropie	Comedy / Horror	Astro Shaw; Preceded by Hantu Kak Limah Balik Rumah (2010) and Hantu Kak Limah 2: Husin, Mon & Jin Pakai Toncit (2013)	
A U G U S T	16	Wheely	Yusry Abdul Halim	Zizan Razak, Johan, Lisa Surihani, Norman Abdul Halim, Felix Mayer, Linus Kraus, Josephine Schmidt	Action / Animation / Comedy	KRU Studios	
A U G U S T	16	Thirudathey Papa Thirudathey	Shalini Balasundaram	Saresh D7, Shalini Balasundaram, Kabil Ganesan, Yuvaraj Krishnasamy	Action / Comedy / Romance	Story Films; Tamil-language film	
A U G U S T	30	Munafik 2	Syamsul Yusof	Syamsul Yusof, Maya Karin, Fizz Fairuz, Mawi, Fauzi Nawawi, Nasir Bilal Khan, Rahim Razali	Horror	Skop Productions; Preceded by Munafik (2016)	
S E P T E M B E R	6	One Two Jaga	Nam Ron, Mohd Shafiq & Pitt Haniff	Zahiril Adzim, Rosdeen Suboh, Ario Bayu, Timothy Castillo, Iedil Putra	Action / Drama	TGV Pictures	
S E P T E M B E R	13	Rise: Ini Kalilah	Prem Nath, Saw Teong Hin & Nik Amir Mustapha	Remy Ishak, Mira Filzah, Sangeeta Krishnasamy, Jack Tan, Shashi Tharan, Jenn Chia	Drama	MM2 Entertainment	
S E P T E M B E R	20	Neeyum Naanum	Bala Ganapathi William	Bala Ganapathi William, Jasmin Micheal, Kavitha Thiagarajan, Suhan	Comedy / Romance	BGW Studios; Tamil-language film	
S E P T E M B E R	20	Langsuir	Osman Ali	Syafiq Kyle, Hannah Delisha	Horror	Early Bird Productions	
S E P T E M B E R	27	Tangisan Akinabalu	Jurey Latiff	Yuri Mejal, Phanthegerow, Syaiful	Horror	New Line Productions	
S E P T E M B E R	27	PASKAL	Adrian Teh	Hairul Azreen, Ammar Alfian, Henley Hii, Taufik Hanafi	Action / Thriller	Asia Tropical Films, Golden Screen Cinemas, Multimedia Entertainment, & Astro Shaw	

=== October – December ===
Opening		Title	Director	Cast	Genre	Notes	Ref.
O C T O B E R	11	Kalla: Hidup Atau Mati	Wan Hasliza	Faizal Hussein, Farali Khan, Vanida Imran, Azhan Rani, Faizal Hussein, Farali Khan, Azhan Rani, Haeryanto Hassan	Action / Drama	Empire Film Solution	
O C T O B E R	25	Gol Dan Gincu Vol. 2	Umi Salwana Omar	Diana Danielle, Ummi Nazeera, Sharifah Amani, Sazzy Falak, Syafiq Kyle, Aedy Ashraf	Comedy / Drama	Red Films	
N O V E M B E R	1	Operasi X	Sandosh Kesavan	Aaron Aziz, Awie, Yusof Haslam, Nasir Bilal Khan, Hairul Azreen	Action / Crime	Dream Pictures Production	
N O V E M B E R	8	7ujuh	Raja Mukhriz Raja Ahmad Kamaruddin	Johan As'ari, Cristina Suzanne, Siti Saleha, Aeril Zafrel, Pekin Ibrahim, Dee Dee Nash, Riz Amin, Marsha Milan Londoh, Faizal Hussein	Horror / Thriller	Primeworks Studios	
N O V E M B E R	15	Mahaguru	Z Lokman	Mokhtaruddin, Alif AF, Mie Raja Lawak, Aman Shah	Action	Bismi Adira Production	
N O V E M B E R	22	Polis EVO 2	Joel Soh, Andre Chiew	Zizan Razak, Shaheizy Sam, Raline Shah, Erra Fazira, Hasnul Rahmat, Mike Lucock, Tanta Ginting, Soffi Jikan, Syafie Naswip, Hairul Azreen	Action	Astro Shaw; Preceded by Polis Evo (2015)	
N O V E M B E R	29	Guang	Quek Shio Chuan	Kyo Chen, Emily Chan, Ernest Chong	Family	MM2 Entertainment; Mandarin-language film	
D E C E M B E R	6	Who Is The Champion?	John Lee	Alien Huang, Jasmine Lee, Judy Chou	Action / Dance / Drama	Mega Films Distribution; Mandarin-language film	
D E C E M B E R	6	3AM	Azlan Shahril	Norman Hakim, Jalaluddin Hassan, Dynas Mokhtar, A. Galak, Rahim Omar, Allana Amir	Horror	Bright Sun Media	
D E C E M B E R	13	A Stolen Life	Lin Shuhung, Kee Lai Koon	Eric Suen, Tong Bing Yu, Yin Yanping, Zhu Yaying	Thriller	MM2 Entertainment; Mandarin-language film	
D E C E M B E R	27	Awang Gerudi	Z. Lokman	Aprena Manrose, Zoey Rahman, Ika Nabila	Comedy	Empire Film Solution	
