= Mining Magnate =

- 半边天
- Genre: Period drama
- Directed by: Ken Ng
- Starring: Debbie Goh; Frederick Lee
- Country of origin: Malaysia
- Original language: Mandarin
- No. of episodes: 30

Production
- Production locations: Perak; Seremban, Negeri Sembilan; Muar, Johor
- Running time: 60 minutes

Original release
- Network: ntv7, MediaCorp Studios Malaysia
- Release: 31 October 2012

Related
- Justice In The City; Age of Glory; Age of Glory 2; The Descendant

Mining Magnate (Simplified Chinese: 半边天) is a Malaysian 2012 Mandarin drama series produced by MediaCorp for ntv7. It is scheduled to air every Monday to Thursday, at 9:30pm on ntv7, starting 31 October 2012. This 30-episode period drama is set on the iron mining industry. Filming started in June 2012. Besides being their first time in a MediaCorp production, the 2012 Golden Awards Most Popular actress Debbie Goh and Frederick Lee stars as couple for the fifth time, but this time as the main protagonists, alongside Aye Kheng.
