= Aenie Wong =

Malaysian television actress

- Born: Malaysia
- Occupation: Actress
- Years active: 2005–present
- Awards: Golden Awards; Most Popular Actress (2014)

Chinese name
- Traditional Chinese: 王淑君
- Simplified Chinese: 王淑君
Transcriptions
Standard Mandarin
- Hanyu Pinyin: Wáng shū jūn
Yue: Cantonese
- Jyutping: Wong4 Suk6 Gwan1
Southern Min
- Hokkien POJ: Ông Sio̍k-kun
- Tâi-lô: Ông Sio̍k-kun

Aenie Wong (Chinese: 王淑君; pinyin: Wáng shū jūn; Jyutping: Wong4 Suk6 Gwan1; Pe̍h-ōe-jī: Ông Sio̍k-kun) is a Malaysian television actress. She has been nominated for three Golden Awards.

== TV films ==
=== Television ===
Year	Work	Role	Notes
2007	The Beautiful Scent 美丽的气味	Wang Li Jiao 王丽娇	
2008	Age Of Glory 情牵南苑	Chen Mei 陈梅	
2008	Exclusive 独家追击	He Zhi Shan 何芷衫	
2009	The Iron Lady 女头家	Lim Xi 林曦	
2009	The Adjusters 稽查专用	Song Hui Yi 宋惠怡	
2010	Age of Glory 2 情牵南洋	Zheng pei Qi 郑佩琪	
2010	Mystique Valley 诡雾山城	Xu Shu Mei 许淑美	
2011	The Adjusters 2 稽查专用2	Wang Jing Jing 王晶晶	
2011	Dark Sunset 黑色夕阳	Lim Ke Xin 林可欣	
2012	Laws of Attraction 寂寞同盟	Chou Ru Hun 周茹芬	
2013	The Undercover 无间行者	Ada Jie ada姐	
2013	The Liar 说谎者	Shen Rou 沈柔	
2014	SPEC OPS - THE BOTTOM LINE 特别行动–底线	Dato Qin Yi Xiang 拿督秦意湘	

=== Movie ===
Year	Work	Role	Notes
2011	The Superb Matchmakers 媒人帮	Goh Meng Hua吴梦华	
2012	Happy Family 哈比全家福	Er Jie二姐	
2012	The Game 夺命游戏	Wang Pei pei 王佩佩	
2013	Lucky Bowl 聚宝盆	Ke Lao Er柯老二	
2014	Spring Chorus 忆起回家	Shen Bi Hua沈碧华	
2014	Fantasia 爱•疯狂	Jiu Zhi Mao九只猫	

== Awards / Finalist ==
Year	Award	Work	Result
2010	2010 Golden Awards	The Iron Lady	Nominated
2012	2012 Golden Awards	The Adjusters	Nominated
2014	2014 Golden Awards	The Game	Nominated
