= Multimedia University =

Private research university in Malaysia

- Universiti Multimedia (Malay)
- Other names: Universiti Telekom Sdn.Bhd., MMU
- Former names: Institute of Telecommunication and Information Technology (1994-1996); Telekom University (UniTELE) (1996-1999)
- Motto: Inquire, inspire and innovate
- Type: Private (Government-linked company status)
- Established: 1996 (as a university)
- Chancellor: Zaki Azmi
- President: Mazliham Mohd Su'ud
- Pro-Chancellor: Richard Malanjum
- Location: Cyberjaya, Selangor; Bukit Beruang, Melaka, Malaysia; 2°14′56″N 102°16′37″E
- Campus: Cyberjaya; Melaka
- Colours: Blue and red
- Mascot: The eBee
- Website: www.mmu.edu.my
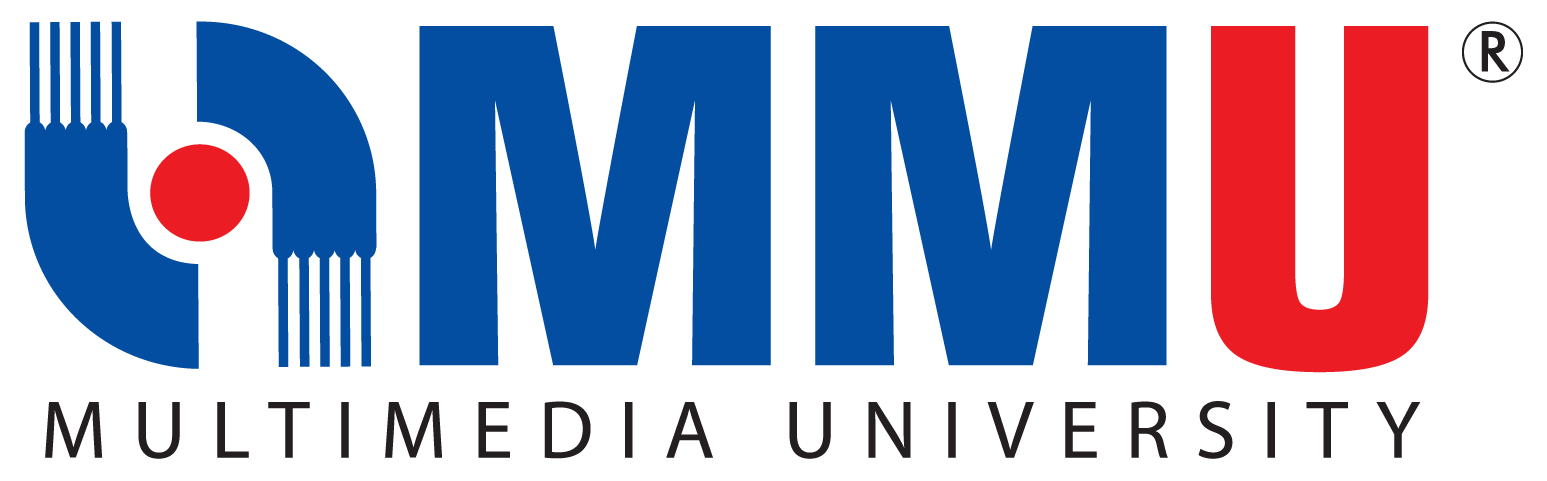

Multimedia University (Malay: Universiti Multimedia; abbreviated as MMU), is a private research-led university in Malaysia whose mission emphasizes teaching, industry collaboration and the preparation of graduates for both professional careers and advanced research. Founded in 1997, it is the first private university within Malaysia and is a member of The Alliance of Government Linked Universities (GLU).

In 1996, the government of Malaysia initiated efforts to liberalize the country's higher education sector and engage the private education industry in advancing human capital development. Consequently, the Ministry of Education sought an established private entity to spearhead the pilot project for the establishment of a university. In October 1996, Telekom Malaysia was granted the distinction by the Ministry of Education to establish Malaysia's inaugural private university. This decision underscored the government's confidence in Telekom Malaysia's capacity to lead the privatization of higher education. Building upon the foundation of the existing ITTM campuses operated by Telekom Malaysia, the company accepted the invitation, resulting in the establishment of Universiti Telekom in Melaka.

The university is structured across two primary campuses: the main campus in Cyberjaya and the Melaka campus. At the Cyberjaya campus, there are seven faculties, each dedicated to specific academic disciplines. Meanwhile, the Melaka campus comprises four faculties and an institute. Coordinating the graduate studies across both campuses is The Institute for Postgraduate Studies (IPS), which collaborates closely with the various faculties to facilitate advanced academic programs and research initiatives.

The official theme song for MMU is "Permata Dunia" which means World's Jewel, composed by Intan Nazrahayu.

== History ==
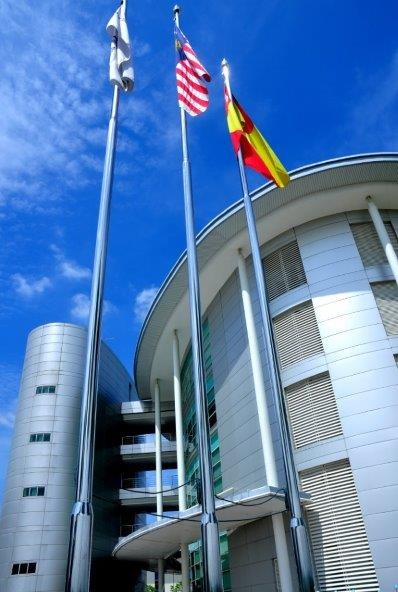
Multimedia University Cyberjaya Campus

In 1994, Telekom Malaysia Berhad (TM), established the Institute of Telecommunication and Information Technology (ITTM) in Taiping, Perak. The first campus was established on TM's former northern region office where the first batch of 42 students were selected to undergo an experimental two-year telecommunication engineering diploma program. In 1996, with the academic success of the first two batches, TM was invited by the Ministry of Education to set up the first private university in Malaysia. ITTM was granted university status and renamed itself to Universiti Telekom.

In 1997, The Malacca campus was set up in the Ayer Keroh town. The setting up of the campus involved redeveloping and repurposing of the former TM southern region office. TM was offered by the Government of Malaysia to establish a university in MSC Malaysia (abbreviation of Multimedia Super Corridor) to catalyse the MSC program. A campus was set up in Cyberjaya and opened on 8 July 1999. The relationship between the Cyberjaya campus and the MSC is intended to be similar to the relationship between Stanford University and Silicon Valley. As a result, the university changed its name from Universiti Telekom to Multimedia University.

In 2013, MMU established a third campus in Iskandar Puteri, Johor, specializing in cinematic arts in collaboration with the University of Southern California (USC)'s School of Cinematic Arts (SCA). In 2021, the cinematics arts programs, under the Faculty of Cinematic Arts, were relocated to Cyberjaya.

== Campuses & E-Learning ==
MMU has two main campuses in Cyberjaya and Melaka. Previously there was another campus in Nusajaya, Johor but it has been closed. The Cyberjaya campus was founded in 1999 and is the main campus after becoming MMU. It is located in the smart city of Cyberjaya, known as the Silicon Valley of Malaysia. The Cyberjaya campus has seven faculties, namely the Faculty of Artificial Intelligence and Engineering (FAIE), Faculty of Computing & Informatics (FCI), Faculty of Creative Multimedia (FCM), Faculty of Cinematic Arts (FCA), Faculty of Applied Communication (FAC) and Faculty of Management (FOM).

The Melaka campus was founded in 1997 and is the secondary campus of MMU. It is located in Bukit Beruang which is close to the historic city of Melaka. The Melaka campus has four faculties, namely the Faculty of Engineering & Technology (FET), Faculty of Information Science & Technology (FIST), Faculty of Business (FOB) and Faculty of Law (FOL). The Melaka campus also has a Centre for Foundation Studies and Extension Education that offers foundation and diploma programs.

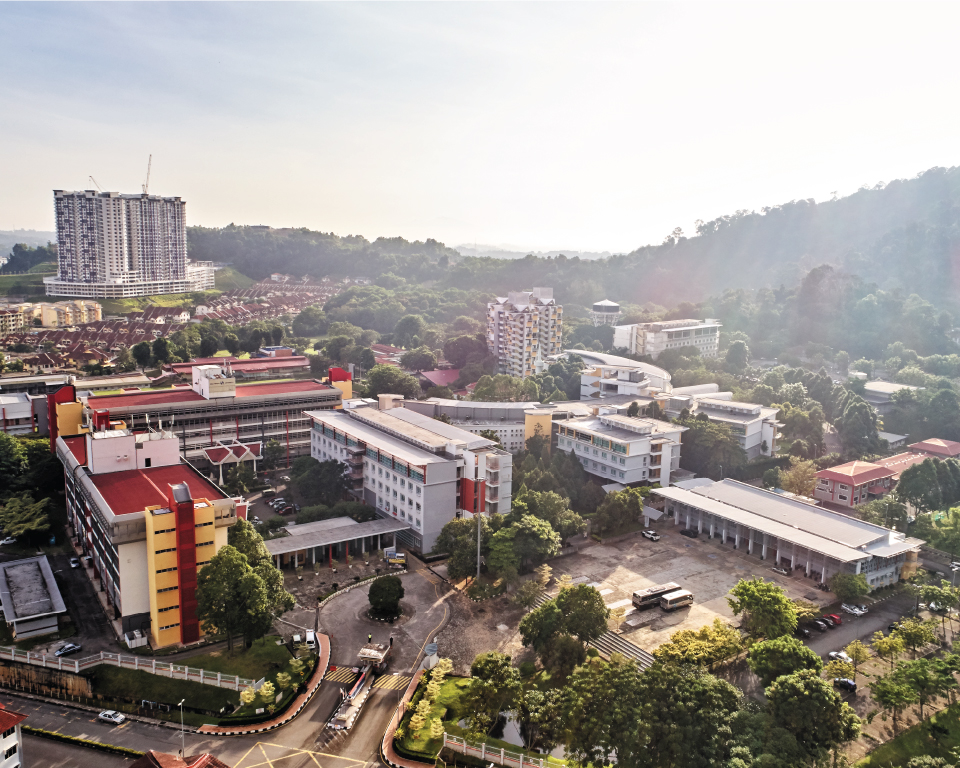
Multimedia University, Malacca campus

The university is equipped with facilities such as ASTRO lab (FCM), SiRi lab (FOM), Innov8 Lab (FCI), Ideas lab, HySpace and HyFlex (FOE), E Moot Court (FOL ), SMART Intelligent Lab (FIST), Bio Informatics Lab (FIST), iBiz Lab (FOB) and iTrade Lab (FOB) as well as numerous computer and specialist labs. There is a 200-capacity industry-grade cinema, sound stage and recording studio, audio studio, foley studio (sound effects), motion capture studio, e-Gallery for exhibitions, VR laboratory and indoor/outdoor aquaponics farms.

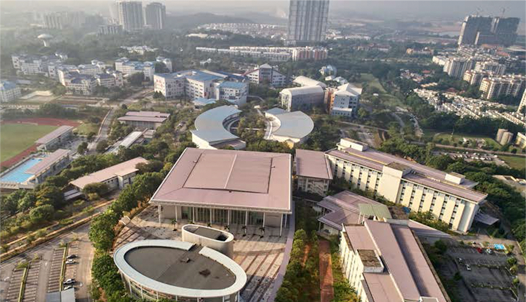
Multimedia University, Cyberjaya Campus

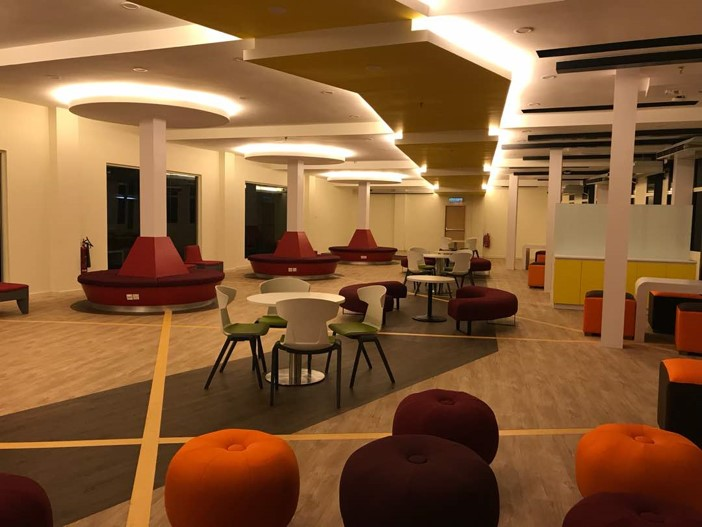
24-Hour Learning Point, Cyberjaya Campus

Swimming pool of Multimedia University, Cyberjaya Campus

Both campuses provide accommodation both on-campus and off-campus, as well as digital libraries and extensive infrastructure such campus-wide Wi-Fi, health clinics, 24-hour security, food and beverage outlets and more. Other available facilities are sports centre such as track & field, indoor sports arena, gym, tennis court, squash courts as well as an Olympic-sized swimming pool. The university also supports a wide range of sports clubs, including archery, badminton, fencing, rugby, swimming, table tennis, taekwondo, tennis, watersports, and wushu.

MMU Stadium of Cyberjaya Campus, serves as the main hub for football activities at the university. The facility features a grass football field that is well-maintained and frequently used for matches and training with seating capacity of 1,000 fans in its stands. In recent years, MMU has made significant strides in developing its football scene, notably signing a partnership with the Kuala Lumpur Football Association (KLFA) in 2023 to enhance coaching, fitness, and tactical training for its students. The stadium and its surrounding fields are also occasionally used to host friendly matches against former national team players and other visiting teams

=== Multimedia Learning System (MMLS) ===
In 1997, alongside the establishment of the Melaka campus, the university initiated the development of its proprietary learning management system, the Multimedia Learning System (MMLS). The project embodied MMU's founding vision as a technology-driven institution and marked a significant milestone in the early adoption of e-learning in Malaysia.

Designed around the concept of a "virtual teacher within a virtual classroom," MMLS aimed to create an interactive and immersive digital learning environment that would supplement face-to-face instruction. Rather than adopting off-the-shelf solutions, the university chose to develop the system internally after evaluating commercial platforms including WebCT, TopC, and Learning Space. The initiative was undertaken "in line with the spirit of homegrown innovation in the MSC."

The system underwent a major upgrade in 2001 to incorporate enhanced multimedia capabilities. It offers a wide range of features for both educators and learners, including course content delivery, progress tracking, online assessments, and communication tools such as email and discussion forums. Instructors are provided with content management tools to organize and update their teaching materials. Built on open-source architecture, the system is platform-independent and adheres to the SCORM international standard for e-learning interoperability.

MMLS garnered national and regional recognition, winning the Asia Pacific Multimedia Super Corridor Information Technology and Telecommunications Awards (APMITTA) in 2000 and the "Best of Education Applications" award at the Asia Pacific Information and Technology and Communications Awards (APICTA) in 2001.

==== Multimedia College ====
Multimedia College (MMC), previously known as Telekom Training College, traces its origins back to 1948 when it was established as a national provider of telecommunications training in Malaysia. Located primarily at Jalan Gurney Kiri/Jalan Semarak Kuala Lumpur, MMC underwent a significant transformation in 2000, transitioning into a Private Institution of Higher Learning. This pivotal transition also involved a change in nomenclature from Telekom Training College to Multimedia College, aimed at broadening its appeal beyond serving solely Telekom staff.

As a subsidiary of Multimedia University (MMU), MMC played a vital role as a feeder institution for MMU, offering students a direct pathway into MMU upon the successful completion of diploma programs offered at MMC. While MMC's primary campus was situated in Kuala Lumpur, it extended its educational presence with five branch campuses located in Malacca, Taiping, Kuala Terengganu, Kuching, and Kota Kinabalu.

However, commencing in 2017, MMC ceased its operations, marking the conclusion of its educational legacy.

== Recognition and achievements ==
Since its establishment MMU has received many recognitions and achievements. The Malaysian government – through the Malaysian Qualifications Agency under the Ministry of Higher Education (MoHE) has granted MMU Self-Accreditation status, formally acknowledging that the university is a trustworthy institution, whose programmes continuously meet or exceed strict specifications.

MMU has been accorded the status of a Premier Digital Tech University. by the Malaysian government, In 2020, MMU was awarded the 5 Stars in SETARA 2019 (Very Competitive). SETARA is a ranking/rating carried out by the Ministry of Education Malaysia to assess Malaysia's universities and colleges in teaching, research, and service.

== Faculties ==
=== Computing and informatics ===
MMU began with a single computing faculty known as the Faculty of Information Technology (FIT) in 1997. After the establishment of the Cyberjaya campus in 1999, FIT was split into the Faculty of Information Science and Technology (FIST) based in the Ayer Keroh campus, and Faculty of Computing & Informatics (FCI), the grey building next to FOM, based in the Cyberjaya campus. FIST offers undergraduate programs with majors in data communications and networking, security technology, artificial intelligence, business intelligence & analytics and bioinformatics. The undergraduate programs in FCI offers specialisations in software engineering, data science, cybersecurity and game development. In 2000, The Microsoft IT Academy of Multimedia University founded by Microsoft for training and development programs, including a Windows DNA lab during a visit by Bill Gates to endorse high-tech hub in Cyberjaya. The Faculty has strong collaborations with multi-national companies such as ZTE, Huawei, Nokia, Intel, Microsoft (Microsoft IT Academy), Cisco (Cisco Networking Academy), Motorola, Oracle Workforce Development Program, Novell Academic Training Partner, Linux Professional Institute and EC-Council. Almost all lecturers and tutors of undergraduate courses in this department have PhD degrees with few exceptions for highly experienced lecturers in their field.

=== Business and management ===
The Faculty of Business (FOB) is based in Malacca. It offers programmes in knowledge management, marketing management, international business, human resource management, banking & finance, and accounting. The Faculty of Management (FOM), based in the Cyberjaya campus, offers programmes in accounting, financial engineering, finance, marketing, management, and economics.

=== Artificial intelligence and engineering ===
The Faculty of Artificial Intelligence and Engineering (FAIE) is based in Cyberjaya. Formerly known as Faculty of Engineering (FOE). It offers bachelor's degrees accredited by the Washington Accord in electrical, electronics, computer, telecommunications, nanotechnology, and optical engineering. The Faculty of Engineering and Technology (FET), based in Malacca offers courses in electronics and mechanical engineering. The majors offered by the FET Electronics Engineering courses are robotics & automation, and telecommunications. All engineering courses in Malacca are also accredited by the Washington Accord. Since 2026, it has been rebranded and relaunched into FAIE.

=== Creative multimedia and cinematic arts ===
The Faculty of Creative Multimedia (FCM), based in the Cyberjaya was established in 1999. Prior to that, it was based in the Malacca campus and known as the Faculty of Media Arts and Science. The Cyberjaya campus offers programs in animation and visual effects, advertising design, and immersive media design. The Johor campus was established in 2013 to offer the cinematic arts program, which was designed in collaboration with the University of Southern California. The Faculty of Cinematic Arts was later established and relocated to the Cyberjaya campus.

=== Law ===
The Faculty of Law (FOL) is based in Malacca. The university's law programme was formerly a part of the business faculty, then known as the Faculty of Business and Law, before establishing as its own independent faculty in 2013. FOL students are fully exempted from taking the CLP examination. On 8 May 2026, the university launched its legal clinic.

=== Strategic communication ===
The Faculty of Applied Communication (FAC) was established in 2016 from its origin as the Learning Institute for Empowerment (LiFE). It currently houses three programmes: Foundation in Communication, Diploma in Applied Communication and Bachelor of Communication (Strategic Communication). FAC underscores the discipline of communication which integrates both theoretical knowledge and real-life practices to enhance human communication.

== Rankings ==
Multimedia University was ranked amongst the top 151-200 universities worldwide by QS World University Rankings in the subject of computer science and electrical engineering between 2014 and 2017 consecutively. 92% of its total students were undergraduates.

University rankings

Global – Overall
- QS World: 851-900 (2026)

Regional – Overall
- QS Asia: =207 (2025)

In 2020, MMU is also ranked as one of the top ten Malaysian universities in Times Higher Education (THE) World University Rankings. It was listed as Top 2 in the field of Computer Science and Top 3 in Engineering & Technology, and Business & Economics among Malaysian private universities.

== Partnerships and industry collaborations ==
Multimedia University maintains strategic partnerships with leading technology companies, government agencies, and academic institutions to enhance its educational programmes, research capabilities, and talent development initiatives.

=== Technology industry ===
MMU maintains strategic collaborations with leading technology companies through its research arm, commercial subsidiary, and direct partnerships.

Telekom Research & Development Sdn Bhd (TM R&D), the innovation arm of the TM Group, is a subsidiary of MMU. Described as the university's "focal point for all research activities," TM R&D works hand-in-hand with MMU to improve research quality, boost global rankings, and prepare skilled graduates for industry. In 2024, TM R&D received MySTI certification from the Ministry of Science, Technology and Innovation (MOSTI) for six homegrown technology solutions, including CONVES (Connected Vehicle System), FIRA (Fast Internet for All), and FORCE (Workforce Management System). The company has generated RM3.2 billion in innovation impact value and secured over 2,800 intellectual property rights.

TM R&D has also collaborated with MMU on specific projects, including the CLIC (Campus Lifecycle Management System) initiative to modernise MMU's e-campus management system, and the ANTRIX and SMART-E platforms, which won double awards at the Malaysia Technology Excellence Awards 2026. In June 2024, MMU and TM R&D signed strategic pacts with Omantel to advance next-generation communications (5G/6G), IoT, and data center services.

MMU has a long-standing collaboration with Microsoft, formalised in September 2000 with the opening of the Microsoft Knowledge Capital Centre (MKCC) at the Cyberjaya campus. The partnership, marked by a visit from Microsoft Chairman Bill Gates, involved a RM10 million sponsorship over five years to establish specialised laboratories, provide scholarships for software engineering students, and offer faculty training under the 'Skills 2000' initiative.

MMU has a long-standing collaboration with Cisco Systems. In January 2005, MMU and Cisco launched the MMU-Cisco Internet Protocol (IP) Communications Innovation Centre, the first of its kind in Malaysia, equipped with US$170,000 worth of IP communications and networking equipment. In April 2026, both parties held discussions to expand their collaboration under Cisco's Country Digital Accelerator (CDA) initiative, exploring opportunities such as expanding Cisco Certified Network Associate (CCNA) programmes through MMU's commercial arm, Cnergy.

In December 2025, MMU expanded its long-standing partnership with ZTE Corporation through the signing of an official addendum. The collaboration, which began with the development of 5G end-to-end laboratories in Cyberjaya and Melaka, has since grown to include scholarships, the designation of MMU as an authorised training and examination centre for ZTE Certification, and the deployment of ZTE's AiCube AI education and compute platform. The partnership also supports public sector talent development through upskilling programmes for government officers.

MMU is also recognised as a Premier Digital Tech Institution by the Malaysia Digital Economy Corporation (MDEC), with key industry partners including Telekom Malaysia, Huawei, and Astro.

== Notable people ==
=== Alumni ===
- Ibrahim Ameer - Finance Minister of the Republic of Maldives.
- Usamah Zaid Yasin - Director of Upin & Ipin and Ejen Ali.
- Dr. Vimala Perumal - Director of The Pasanga Trilogy.
- Nizam Razak - Director and creator of Boboiboy, Boboiboy Galaxy & Mechamato.
- Redza Minhat - Actor, producer, screenwriter and banker

=== Faculty ===
- YABhg. Tun Dato’ Seri Zaki Tun Azmi (Chancellor, Adjunct Professor) - Sixth Chief Justice of Malaysia and Former President of the Court of Appeal.
- Justice Datuk Vernon Ong Lam Kiat (Adjunct Professor) - Judge of the Federal Court of Malaysia.
