= Sampson Yuen =

Hong Kong film producer

Sampson Yuen Choi-Hin (Chinese: 袁再显; born 1958) is a Hong-Kong producer and director who has worked in Hong Kong, Singapore and Malaysia. He is best known for directing Who is the Winner (1993), Petaling Street Warriors (2011), Million Loves In Me (2017) and producing Ah Long Pte Ltd (2008).

Beginning from 2009, Yuen is the CEO of Juita Entertainment which specializes in the production of Chinese films. The company is a subsidiary of Juita Viden Media, largest television content distribution company in Malaysia.

Starting out in Hong Kong with TVB & ATV, he worked in the Hong Kong media scene for 15 years, where he directed Who Is The Winner (1993) before moving to Singapore and jointly setting up SPH MediaWorks which won the awards Broadcaster of the Year and Terrestrial Channel of the Year in 2002. For a decade he worked in Singapore and was involved with television series, notably The Unbeatables II (Star Awards for Best Drama Serial nominee, 1997) for TCS, From the Medical Files 2 (Star Awards for Best Drama Serial nominee, 1999) for MediaCorp Studios, Cash Is King for Channel U, Tonight I Will Tell - Murder by Love.

In 2007 Sampson moved to Malaysia and executive produced Ah Long Pte Ltd which took SG$5 million at combined box offices of Malaysia & Singapore making it the highest grossing Chinese movie in the country. Then he produced The Wedding Game in 2009.

He also produced two period dramas; Age of Glory (780,000 viewers on NTV7, 2008) and The Iron Lady (900,000 viewers on ntv7, 2009) – both being the highest rated shows for ntv7's Hong belt and contributing to a 53% share of Chinese audience for the channel. In 2010, The Iron Lady received five awards in Malaysia first Golden Awards, including Best Drama, Most Popular Drama, Best Actress, Best Supporting Actress and Best Drama Theme Song. Afterwards he produced A Time to Embrace (8TV) and All Within Four Seas (Astro HHD) and The Descendant (NTV7).

In 2011 Yuen co-directed and produced through Juita Entertainment Petaling Street Warriors, the first period kung fu comedy to be produced locally in Malaysia and Singapore.

In 2017 Sampson Yuen directed the Hong-Kong-Malaysian drama film Million Loves In Me, based on a headline case in Hong Kong.
