= Zui Ai =

Zui Ai may refer to:

- Love for Life, a 2011 Chinese film
- Forget Me Not (TV series), a 2011 Malaysian TV series
