= The Descendant =

- 香火
- Genre: Period drama
- Written by: Teh Kean Guan
- Directed by: Jason Kok; Ng Wing Yi
- Starring: Yeo Yann Yann; Debbie Goh; Steve Yap; Frederick Lee; Tan Hau Yen
- Opening theme: 《香火》(Xianghuo) by Yeo Yann Yann and Debbie Goh
- Ending theme: 《灰》(Huī) by Wu Jiahui
- Composer: Wu Jiahui
- Country of origin: Malaysia
- Original language: Mandarin
- No. of episodes: 30

Production
- Executive producers: Sampson Yuen; Francis Foo
- Producer: Jason Kok
- Running time: 60 minutes (approx.)

Original release
- Network: ntv7
- Release: 9 February 2012

Related
- The Iron Lady; Age of Glory

The Descendant (Simplified Chinese: 香火) (Literally: Incense, a word play of inscent) is a Malaysian 2012 mega blockbuster Mandarin drama series produced by Juita Entertainment for ntv7. It is scheduled to air every Monday to Thursday, at 10:00 p.m. on ntv7, starting 9 February 2012. This 30-episode period drama is set on the incense industry. Casting was made on 25 June 2011 and started filming on 7 July 2011.

== Plot ==
Chen Yulin (Steve Yap) is forced to marry Shen Danfang (Yeo Yann Yann) to inherit her family's incense making business. Yulin has also promised his father-in-law to let their first child to follow Dan Fang's family name to ensure the continuity of the bloodline. On the day of their marriage, Yulin was surprised when he realized Yuhua (Debbie Goh), his longtime lover, is now his sister-in-law.

== Cast ==
=== Main cast ===
Cast	Role	Description
Phua Chee Kin	Xie Hongyi	Danfang and Yuhua's father
Yeo Yann Yann	Xie Danfang	Yulin's wife Yuhua's sister
Debbie Goh	Xie Yuhua	Yulin's lover Danfang's sister
Steve Yap	Chen Yulin	Danfang's husband Yuhua's lover father of Shanshu, Xianghai, Xiangyang and Guozhai.
Frederick Lee	Fugui	Guozhai's adoptive father
Brenda Chiah	Chen Shanshu	Yulin and Danfang's eldest child
Leslie Chai	Xie Xianghai	Yulin and Danfang's second child
Kyo Chen	Chen Xiangyang	Yulin and Danfang's youngest child
Tan Hau Yen	Gou Zhai/Xie Shaozun	Yulin and Yuhua's son

=== Supporting cast ===
Cast	Role	Description
Guo Wei		
Qin Wenbin		
Chen Yingwen		
Zhang Shunyuan		
Yong Hua		
