= Asian Television Award for Best Actor =

The Asian Television Award for Best Actor in a Leading Role is awarded annually by the Asian Television Awards.

== Winners and nominees ==
Year	Winner and nominees	English title	Original title
16th (2011)	(Hong Kong) Kevin Cheng	Ghetto Justice	怒火街頭
16th (2011)	(Malaysia) Christopher Lee	Breakout	破天网
16th (2011)	(China) Qi Yuwu	The Family Court	走进走出
16th (2011)	(Hong Kong) Bobby Au-yeung	Ghost Catcher	天師鍾馗之美麗傳說
16th (2011)	(Hong Kong) Carl Ng	Point of Entry	入境点
16th (2011)	(United States) Jourdan Lee	Point of Entry	入境点
16th (2011)	(Singapore) Tay Ping Hui	C.L.I.F.	警徽天职
17th (2012)	(Hong Kong) Moses Chan	When Heaven Burns	天與地
17th (2012)	(China) Chen Jianbin	Empresses in the Palace	後宮·甄嬛傳
17th (2012)	(China) Mickey He	Palace	宮
17th (2012)	(Taiwan) Lee Wei	Man Boy	小孩大人
17th (2012)	(Philippines) Coco Martin	Maalaala Mo Kaya (Episode "Kamao")	
17th (2012)	(Malaysia) Christopher Lee	Show Hand	注定
17th (2012)	(Singapore) Chew Chor Meng	Show Hand	注定
18th (2013)	(Taiwan) Chris Wu	Emerging Light	愛在旭日升起時
18th (2013)	(Malaysia) Coby Chong	Summer Brothers	羽过天晴
18th (2013)	(Malaysia) Lawrence Wong	In Laws	男婚女嫁
18th (2013)	(Malaysia) Adrian Tan	Lucky Bowl Part 2	聚宝盆续集
18th (2013)	(Taiwan) Jeff Wang	Voice of the Heart	聽見，愛
18th (2013)	(Taiwan) Chang Chen-kuang	Sunshine Heaven	日光天堂
19th (2014)	(Singapore) Pierre Png	Zero Calling	
19th (2014)	(Philippines) Dennis Trillo	My Husband's Lover	
19th (2014)	(China) Mickey He	Love of OB & GYNs	爱的妇产科
19th (2014)	(China) Zhai Tianlin	The Master of the House	大當家
19th (2014)	(Taiwan) Ban Tieh-hsiang	My Super Dad	無敵老爸
19th (2014)	(Singapore) Pierre Png (2 nominations)	The Journey: A Voyage	信約：唐山到南洋
20th (2015)	(China) Zhang Jiayi	Forty-nine Days Memory	四十九日·祭
20th (2015)	(Singapore) Pierre Png	Zero Calling 2	
20th (2015)	(Taiwan) Jag Huang	Wake Up	麻醉風暴
20th (2015)	(Taiwan) Lan Cheng-lung	Apple in Your Eye	妹妹
20th (2015)	(China) Tong Dawei	Tiger Mom	虎妈猫爸
20th (2015)	(Malaysia) Christopher Lee	Against the Tide	逆潮
20th (2015)	(Singapore) Norman Ishak	Firasat	
21st (2016)	(Taiwan) Lung Shao-hua	The Taste of Dang-Liang’s Family	党良家之味
21st (2016)	(Malaysia) Bront Palarae	Eropah, Here I Am	
21st (2016)	(Malaysia) Christopher Lee	Crescendo	起飞
21st (2016)	(Malaysia) Frederick Lee	Turning Point	转捩点
21st (2016)	(Thailand) Sukollawat Kanarot	The Sisters	เพื่อน แพง
21st (2016)	(Singapore) A. Panneeirchelvam	Thalaimurai	
22nd (2017)	(Taiwan) Tsai Chen-Nan	She’s Family	媽媽不見了
22nd (2017)	(Taiwan) Chris Wu	We Are One	望月
22nd (2017)	(Taiwan) Ko Shu Yuan	Far and Away	外鄉女
22nd (2017)	(Singapore) A. Panneeirchelvam	Ninaivugal	
22nd (2017)	(Malaysia) Hasnul Rahmat	7 Hari	
22nd (2017)	(India) Satyadeep Mishra	P.O.W. – Bandi Yuddh Ke	P.O.W. - बंदी युद्ध के
22nd (2017)	(Singapore) Tony Eusoff	The Hush	
22nd (2017)	(Singapore) Remesh Panicker	The Hush	
23rd (2018)	(Taiwan) Rexen Cheng	Schrodinger’s Cat	薛丁格的貓
23rd (2018)	(Thailand) Nadech Kugimiya	Lehlub Salubrang (Switch)	เล่ห์ลับสลับร่าง
23rd (2018)	(Hong Kong) Francis Ng	The Trading Floor	東方華爾街
23rd (2018)	(Taiwan) Joseph Chang	The Trading Floor	東方華爾街
23rd (2018)	(Hong Kong) Eason Chan	My Very Short Marriage	短暫的婚姻
23rd (2018)	(India) Laksh Lalwani	Porus	हिन्दी
23rd (2018)	(Thailand) Ananda Everingham	SriAyodhaya	ศรีอโยธยา
23rd (2018)	(Taiwan) Peter Ho	Age Of Rebellion	翻牆的記憶
23rd (2018)	(China) Zhang Han	Here to Heart	温暖的弦
