= Tan Poi Sin =

- Born: Tan Poi Sin; Malaysia

Tan Poi Sin

Chinese name
- Traditional Chinese: 陳佩欣
- Simplified Chinese: 陈佩欣
- Hanyu Pinyin: Chén Pèixīn
- Jyutping: Can4 Pui3 Jan1
- Hokkien POJ: Tân Pōe-him
- Tâi-lô: Tân Puē-him

Tan Poi Sin (simplified Chinese: 陈佩欣; traditional Chinese: 陳佩欣; pinyin: Chén Pèixīn; Jyutping: Can4 Pui3 Jan1; Pe̍h-ōe-jī: Tân Pōe-him) is a TV drama and documentary director-producer from Malaysia. Established as a documentary director, she started out as a screenwriter, and was a producer-director in Astro. Her meritorious efforts in historical research landed her the role of Assistant Director in Astro AEC's documentary Malaysia, My Home! (2005). Her directorial work included Journey with Jason, Taste with Jason and Hai Zi. She produced, directed and wrote the script for New Village Stories (2009), which broke the rating record of locally produced Chinese content show on paid TV, and received tremendous response from the Chinese community.

== Filmography ==
=== Associate Producer ===
Feature-length:

- Petaling Street Warriors / 2011 / James Lee & Sampson Yuen (director)
