= Vimala Perumal =

Film Director and Academician

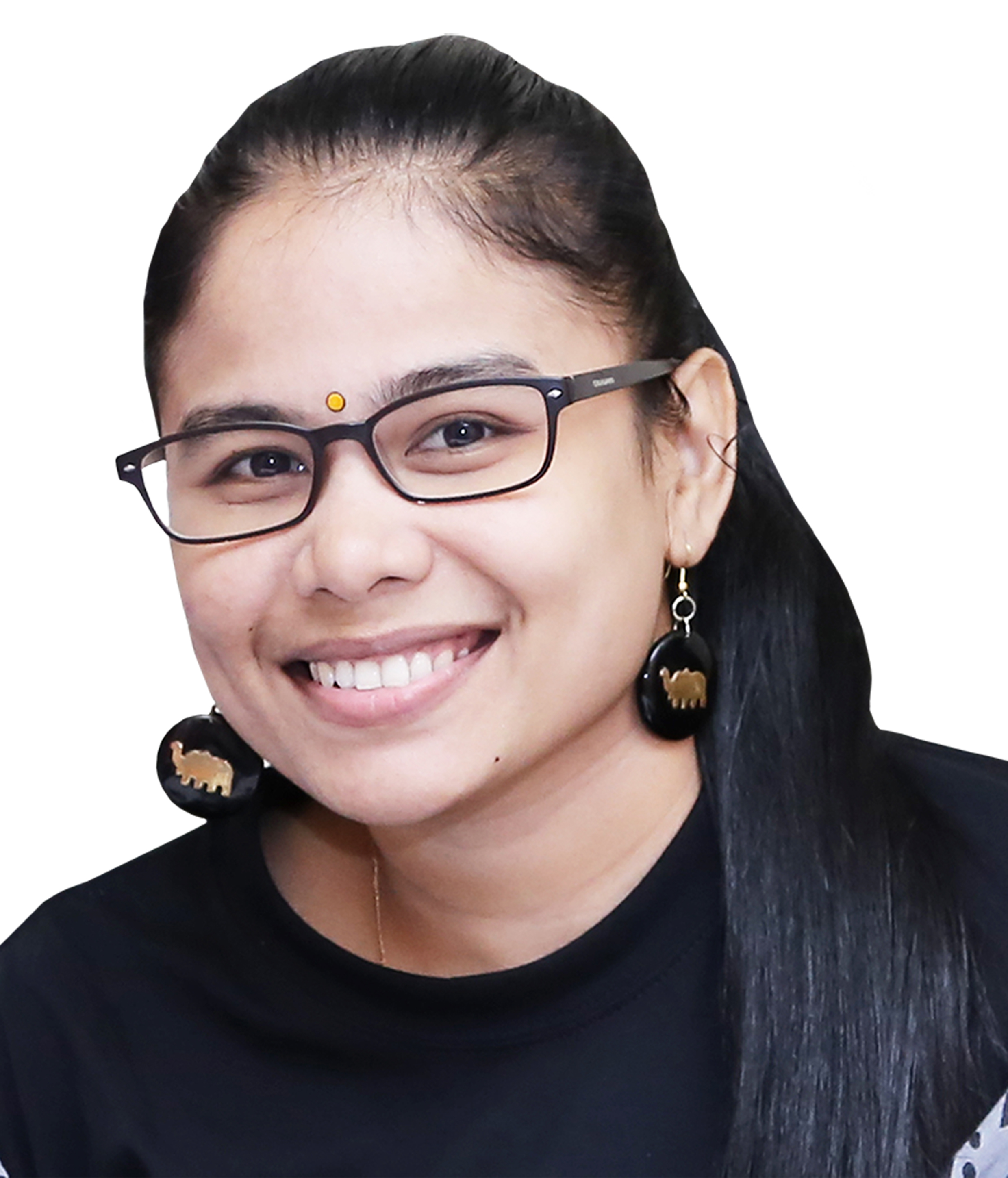
- Born: May 24, 1982 (age 43); Sungai Petani, Kedah, Malaysia
- Occupations: Film director, screenwriter, senior lecturer
- Years active: 2004–present
- Spouse: Denes Kumar (m. 2011)
- Children: 2

Vimala Perumal is a Malaysian filmmaker and professor. She is currently a Senior Lecturer at Multimedia University, in Cyberjaya, Malaysia. Her film Vedigundu Pasangge received national and international recognition.

== Early life ==
Perumal was born in 1982, Sungai Petani, Kedah, Malaysia. She completed her film studies at Multimedia University. She received a doctorate in film production and human communication from the University of Putra Malaysia becoming the first female film director in Malaysia with PhD.

== Career ==
Perumal made her feature film debut with Chalanggai (Dancing Bells) in 2007 as a writer and producer.

=== The Pasanga Trilogy ===
She directed her debut feature film, Vilaiyaatu Pasange (Playful Folks), which released on 13 October 2011. This was the first Malaysian Tamil Movie to be played on Astro Box Office.

She released her second feature film, Vetti Pasanga (Useless Folks) on 2 January 2014. This won two Silver Awards in International level, and broke the record for the Highest Box Office Collection during its release, for a Malaysian Tamil Movie under the Wajib Tayang Scheme.

The third sequel in this series, Vedigundu Pasangge (Rowdy Folks), was released on 26 July 2018 in 55 theatres, and became the First Malaysian Tamil film to screen for two weeks in the United Kingdom. It also premiered in Singapore, India, and Sri Lanka. In 2019, it won the Special Jury Award in the 30th Malaysian Film Festival. The film received the Malaysia Book of Records as the Highest Collection for Tamil Movies in Malaysia.

=== Recent work ===
In conjunction with the Independence Day in 2016, Maxis collaborated with a few Malaysian directors to release their 360 degree camera. Perumal and Kumar produced and directed a 360 degree film for this, “Rojak Cow Cow” on YouTube.

In 2020, Perumal ventured into directing a Tamil drama series, Tamiletchumy. The series was renewed for a second season, which aired in August 2021.

==== Academic ====
In early 2004, Perumal began teaching visual arts. In 2009, she taught the foundation course for Creative Multimedia, and became a Senior Lecturer at MMU. She later became the Head of the Humanities and Multimedia Department, and developed the curriculum for the Cinematic Arts Programme. As of 2020, she is the Editor-in-Chief of the International Journal of Creative Multimedia (IJCM).

== Filmography ==
Year	Title	Credited as			Notes
Year	Title	Director	Writer	Producer	Notes
2007	Chalanggai	No	Screenplay	Yes	
2011	Vilaiyaatu Pasange	Yes	Yes	No	
2014	Vetti Pasanga	Yes	Yes	No	
2018	Vedigundu Pasangge	Yes	Yes	No	
2020–2021	Tamiletchumy	Yes	Yes	No	TV series
2023–2025	Pasanga	No	No	Yes	TV series
2025	Tamil School Pasanga	No	No	Yes	

== Publications ==
Book chapters:

1. Tamil Film Industry in Malaysia. In Malaysian creative industry (pp. 34–36). Malaysia. 2016.
2. Indian Classical Dance (Bharatanatyam) in 3D Animation, VDM Publishing House, Germany, 2010.
3. The Need of Knowledge Management in Malaysian Film Industry, Lambert Academic Publishing (LAP), Germany, 2009.

== Accolades ==
Award	Category	Result	Notes	Ref.
30th Malaysia Film Festival	Best Director	Nominated		
30th Malaysia Film Festival	Best Screenplay	Nominated		
30th Malaysia Film Festival	Best Story	Nominated	alongside Denes Kumar	
Norway Tamil Film Festival Awards 2019	Best Tamil Film (Midnight Sun)	Won		
Cinefest Malaysia Awards 2019	Best Director	Won		
Barcelona Planet Film Festival	Best Screenplay	Won		
Barcelona Planet Film Festival	Best Female Film Maker	Nominated		
