= Think Big Big =

- Directed by: Chiu Keng Guan
- Starring: Serene Lim; Fabian Loo; Vivienne Oon; Ruby Yap; Keigrey Kam; Moon Yoong; Joanne Lau
- Production company: Woohoo Pictures Production
- Distributed by: Astro Shaw; Golden Screen Cinemas; Multimedia Entertainment
- Release date: 15 February 2018 (Malaysia)
- Running time: 101 minutes
- Country: Malaysia
- Language: Mandarin

Think Big Big (Chinese: 大大哒) is a 2018 Malaysian Mandarin-language film directed by Chiu Keng Guan.
