= Mrs K =

2016 Malaysian-Hong Kong film by Ho Yuhang

- Theatrical release poster
- Directed by: Ho Yuhang
- Written by: Chan Wai-keung; Ho Yuhang
- Produced by: Ho Yuhang; Albert Lee; Lina Tan; Lorna Tee
- Starring: Kara Wai; Simon Yam; Wu Bai; Siow Li Xuan
- Cinematography: Teoh Gay Hian
- Edited by: Sharon Chong; Soo Mun Thye
- Music by: Fugu
- Production company: Red Films
- Distributed by: GSC Movies (Malaysia); Emperor Motion Pictures (Hong Kong)
- Release dates: October 7, 2016 (Busan); September 7, 2017 (Malaysia); September 21, 2017 (Hong Kong); November 18, 2018 (Russia); January 10, 2019 (Singapore)
- Running time: 97 minutes
- Countries: Malaysia; Hong Kong
- Languages: Cantonese; Mandarin; Malay; English

Mrs K is a 2016 crime action film directed by Ho Yuhang. A Malaysian-Hong Kong co-production, it stars Kara Wai, Simon Yam, Wu Bai, Ruby Yap and Siow Li Xuan. This movie was only released in Moscow, Russia under the title: Миссис Кей (missis kei in Russian)

== Premise ==
Mrs K is a story of a woman who gives everything that she has to protect her husband and daughter when enemies from her past come hunting her. She is forced to revisit her dark past when her teenage daughter is kidnapped by enemies from her past.

== Cast ==
- Kara Wai as Mrs K
- Simon Yam as Scarface
- Wu Bai as Mr K
- Siow Li Xuan as Little K
- Faizal Hussein as Tano
- Tony Liu as Monkey
- Ruby Yap as Fong
- Lenny Ooi as Loong
- Joe Chang as Blondie
- Germaine Yeap as Nikkie
- Kirk Wong as Priest
- Fruit Chan as Retiree
- Dain Said as Loan shark
- Alvin Chong as Robbers 1
- Bernard Hiew as Robbers 2
- R. Ramasundran as Rajeev

== Reception ==
Variety called it "is a stylish action movie whose light touch persuades us to accept still-lethal potential of a nearly 60-year-old heroine" and "it's expertly crafted good fun that should appeal to genre fans across many borders."

Deadline Hollywood reported in 2022 that 87North Productions planned to remake the film with Mishna Wolff as the screenwriter.

=== Accolades ===
Award	Category	Recipients	Result	Ref.
53rd Golden Horse Awards	Best Action Choreography	Adam Chan	Nominated	
Five Flavours Film Festival	New Asian Cinema - Best Film	Ho Yuhang	Nominated	

== Singaporean and Russian release ==
In Singapore and Russia, the movie was released in 2018 under Mosfilm Asia.
