= Frederick Lee (actor) =

Malaysian actor (born 1976)

- 李銘忠
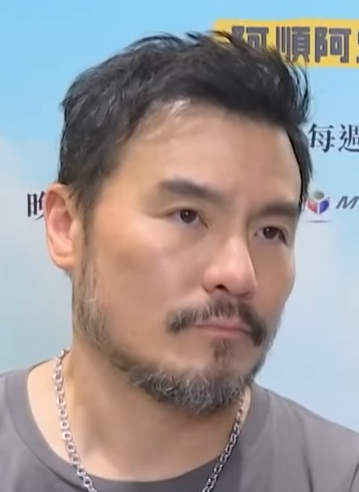
- Lee in June 2025
- Born: Lee Ming-zhong; 18 August 1976 (age 50); Malacca, Malaysia
- Occupation: Actor
- Years active: 2006–present
- Family: Christopher Lee (brother)

Frederick Lee Ming-zhong (Chinese: 李銘忠; born 18 August 1976) is a Malaysian actor based in Malaysia and Taiwan. He worked as an interior designer before making his acting debut in 2006 and pursuing a career in Malaysian television. He gained prominence after winning Best Actor in the 2014 Golden Awards for his role as Fugui in The Descendant (2012). He starred in Malaysian films You Mean the World to Me (2017) and Fly by Night (2018), as well as in television series such as Turning Point (2015), The Missing Menu (2016), and Gifted (2018). Lee made his Taiwanese debut with The Scoundrels (2018), for which he received a nomination for Best Supporting Actor in the 21st Taipei Film Awards, marking the beginning of his multi-national career. He won Best Actor in the 28th Asian Television Awards for the Taiwanese Disney+ series Taiwan Crime Stories (2023).

== Early life ==
Lee was born on 18 August 1976 in Malacca, Malaysia. He has an older brother, Christopher Lee, who is five years his senior, and who also pursued a career as an actor, inspiring Lee to follow the same path, along with another brother and a sister. They grew up in a kampung, and Lee described their family's financial situation as poor, often having to move homes due to an inability to pay rent and he had to begin working part-time painting advertisement signs at the age of 13. Lee attended Chinese-language schools for primary education, which enabled him to speak fluent Mandarin, before transferring to public schools for secondary education. From a young age, he was interested in drawing and intended to study advertising design at university, but switched to interior design upon Christopher's advice due to their family's inability to afford the necessary equipment for advertising design and the more stable career prospects it offered. During university, Lee filmed advertisements but was not interested to pursue a modeling career. He became captivated by acting after watching his brother in the television series The Price of Peace in his dormitory, where he was impressed by his brother's "magical buzz". After graduation, Lee worked as an interior designer.

== Career ==
=== Debut and breakout with The Descendant (2006–2014) ===
In 2000, five years after graduating from university, Lee was invited to join Star Search, the Malaysian version of a reality show that originated in Singapore and helped launch his brother's career. He initially declined the invitation after learning that the producers had approached him because of his brother's fame, but ultimately accepted the offer upon reconsideration of the opportunity it presented. Lee did not win the competition and soon learned that his interior designing company had replaced him, leaving him unemployed for six months. During this time, a dance teacher he met through Star Search invited him to act in a stage play, prompting him to explore whether he truly had a passion for acting. He officially began his acting career in 2006, starring in non-prime time Malaysian television series for five years, a period he described as "unknown to others" and during which he did not achieve any breakthroughs. He then appeared in the ntv7 Chinese-language series Age of Glory as He Fu-gui and in Age of Glory 2 as Ma Ying-jie, as well as in the drama series The Iron Lady, which were among his earliest roles. He also had a starring role in the Malaysian Chinese-language film Petaling Street Warriors.

In the early 2010s, Lee continued to star in Chinese-language dramas in Malaysia, but due to the decline of the Malaysian television industry in the early 2010s and a lack of Chinese-language productions at that time, he faced limited job opportunities. He briefly followed his brother to Singapore and joined his agency for a month but did not receive any role offers and returned to Malaysia afterward. In 2014, struggling financially with his unstable income as an actor, Lee considered quitting showbiz and returning to interior design. However, he won Best Actor in the 2014 Golden Awards for his role as Fugui in the 2012 ntv7 series The Descendant, which led to a surge in film role offers following this critical recognition. He continued to star in a lead role in both seasons of romance series In Laws from 2013 to 2014, and was cast in leading roles in the Malaysian drama series Radio Rhapsody, and the legal drama series The Precedents. He portrayed Cheng You-wei, a police detective captain, in the crime series Turning Point, for which he was nominated for Best Actor in the 21st Asian Television Awards. Lee then starred in the 2016 ntv7 comedy series The Missing Menu, where he was nominated for Best Actor again in the 2017 Golden Awards.

=== Multi-national career (2016–2022) ===
In 2016, at the age of 40, he began his career in Taiwanese cinema, landing his debut role as Freddie, a gangster boss, in the crime film The Scoundrels, which premiered in 2018. He received a nomination for Best Supporting Actor in the 21st Taipei Film Awards for this role, although Lee stated that he was suffering from gingivitis during the shoot and he felt that he did not deliver his performance in the best condition. Following this performance, he developed a career in Taiwan. In 2017, he appeared in the Malaysian mystery thriller series Revolving Heart, as well as a guest role in the Chinese television series Midnight Diner. He was also cast in a starring role as Sunny in Saw Teong Hin's 2017 Malaysian drama film You Mean the World to Me, and starred as Jared, a gang boss and the main antagonist, in the 2018 Malaysian crime film Fly by Night. In Wendy Ide's review for Screen Daily, she noted that "it's an extreme performance from Lee that veers unpredictably from demented genius to prop-chewing hamming, often within a single shot", and remarked that Lee "appears to be having a lot of fun". He also appeared in the Singaporean-Malaysian series Gifted as a narcotics captain, where Ling Zi of Lianhe Zaobao praised his performance as "outstanding" and noted that it was "more solid" than that of his co-star Patrick Lee, and in the Malaysian series My Sensei Nyonya that same year.

In 2019, Lee starred as the male lead in the Malaysian crime thriller series Turning Point 2, followed by a role as a strict basketball coach in the 2020 Taiwanese web series Fly the Jumper. That same year, Lee appeared as a forensic surgeon who is a serial murderer in secret in the Singaporean thriller series Mind Eye. In 2021, he portrayed Wang, a detective involved in a psychological experiment alongside a scientist played by Sandrine Pinna, in the psychological thriller film Plurality. Han Cheung of Taipei Times praised Lee's performance as "capable", but lamented that his character ended up being forgettable due to a lack of character development; while Phuong Le of The Guardian noted that the tension between his character and Pinna's was "interestingly explored", while expressing disappointment over the lack of follow-up on his character. He also shared a lead role with Jake Hsu in the Hong Kong-Taiwanese series Trinity of Shadow, playing the older version of Wu Da-tung, a serial murderer on the run. Also in 2021, Lee was cast alongside his brother Christopher in the Taiwanese crime thriller series Danger Zone, where he played a contract assassin named Lin Chi-chen, while Christopher portrayed Tan Chong-hui, a police captain. The series marks the first time the brothers collaborated in a project. Lee made a cameo appearance in the Disney+ series Women in Taipei in 2022.

=== Broadening opportunities and critical recognition (2023–present) ===
In 2023, he starred as the titular character Boy in the Taiwanese drama film A Boy and A Girl, followed by a lead role as Chao Tzu-jie, a man who exchanged his body with Hank Wang and Lavinia Chen 's characters in the Taiwanese drama film Fish Memories, released the following year. He received nominations for Best Actor and Best Supporting Actor in the 26th Taipei Film Awards for these roles respectively. He also starred in a main role in the Disney+ crime series Taiwan Crime Stories. Tsai Ya-wen, writing for Storm Media, particularly appreciated his chemistry with co-star Wang Po-chieh, praising the blend of comedy and seriousness in their interactions. Lee won Best Actor in the 28th Asian Television Awards and was nominated for Best Male Lead in a Television Series in the 58th Golden Bell Awards for this performance. He also played Uncle Black, a cultural relic restorer, in the PTS television film Night Blindness, for which he received nominations for Best Leading Actor in a Miniseries or Television Film in the 59th Golden Bell Awards and Best Actor in the 29th Asian Television Awards.

In 2024, Lee played a supporting role as the cheating husband of Dee Hsu's character in the seventh segment of the Netflix romance anthology series At the Moment. He also took on a lead role as Uncle Bin, a master of disguise in a bank heist crew, in the Netflix crime film Breaking and Re-entering. Rob Hunter of Film School Rejects observed that Lee was "clearly enjoying" his performance in the film. Besides, he starred in a supporting role as the right-hand man to Jason King's character in the Taiwanese gangster film GATAO: Like Father Like Son, and appeared as Antonio Chao, a victim of the White Terror, in Chung Mong-hong's historical drama film The Embers in the same year. He starred in the 2025 Taiwanese crime thriller film 96 Minutes.

== Personal life ==
Lee used the stage name Lee Meng-chong (李洺中) during his early acting career but changed back to his birth name Lee Min-zhong, in late 2018 after his mother died, viewing it as a way to honor her memory. Lee married Jess, a Malaysian IT professional, in September 2024 after ten years of dating. He currently resides in Malaysia.

== Filmography ==
=== Film ===
| Year | Title | Role | Notes/Ref. |
|---|---|---|---|
| 2011 | Petaling Street Warriors | Ma Fuyi (馬福儀) | |
| 2017 | You Mean the World to Me | Sunny | |
| 2018 | The Scoundrels | Freddie (小黑哥) | |
| 2018 | Fly by Night | Jared | |
| 2021 | Plurality | Detective Wang (王志成) | |
| 2023 | A Boy and A Girl | Boy (男人) | |
| 2024 | Breaking and Re-entering | Uncle Bin (斌叔) | |
| 2024 | Fish Memories | Chao Tzu-jie (趙子傑) | |
| 2024 | GATAO: Like Father Like Son | Chi | |
| 2024 | The Embers | Antonio Chao (趙之亮) | |
| 2025 | 96 Minutes | Wu Chang-ren (吳常仁) | |

=== Television ===
| Year | Title | Role | Notes/Ref. |
|---|---|---|---|
| 2008 | Age of Glory | He Fu-gui (何富貴) | Recurring role |
| 2009 | The Iron Lady | Ou Zhen-ming (歐振明) | Main role |
| 2010 | Age of Glory 2 | Ma Ying-jie (馬英傑) | Main role |
| 2010 | Glowing Embers | Tang Li (唐利) | Main role |
| 2012 | The Descendant | Fugui (傅貴) | Main role |
| 2013–2014 | In Laws | Zheng Xing-feng (鄭勝峰) | Main role (season 1–2) |
| 2013 | Radio Rhapsody | Guan Zhong-heng (關中恆) | Main role |
| 2015 | The Precedents | Michael Lu (陸天佑) | Main role |
| 2015 | Turning Point | Cheng You-wei (程有為) | Main role |
| 2016 | The Missing Menu | Chen Jia-quan (陳家全) | Main role |
| 2017 | Revolving Heart | Louis Yuan (袁瑞陽) | Main role |
| 2017 | Midnight Diner | Li Kai (李凱) | Guest role |
| 2018 | Gifted | Liao Weihao (廖偉豪) | Main role |
| 2018 | My Sensei Nyonya | Zheng Kang-sheng (鄭康生) | Co-starring |
| 2019 | Turning Point 2 | Liu Jin-yen (劉謹言) | Main role |
| 2020 | Fly the Jumper | Li Sha-mo (李沙末) | Main role |
| 2020 | Mind Eye | Lo Jia-ke (羅家赫) | Main role |
| 2021 | Trinity of Shadow | Wu Da-tung (胡大東) | Main role |
| 2021 | Danger Zone | Lin Chi-chen (林啟辰) | Recurring role |
| 2022 | Women in Taipei | Kevin | Cameo |
| 2023 | Taiwan Crime Stories | Shen Chang-rong (沈昌戎) | Main role |
| 2023 | Night Blindness | Uncle Black (黑叔) | Main role; television film |
| 2024 | At the Moment | Chen Jie-wei (陳哲偉) | Main role; segment 7 |

== Awards and nominations ==
| Year | Award | Category | Work | Result | Ref. |
|---|---|---|---|---|---|
| 2014 | 2014 Golden Awards | Best Actor | The Descendant | Won | |
| 2016 | 21st Asian Television Awards | Best Actor | Turning Point | Nominated | |
| 2017 | 2017 Golden Awards | Best Actor | The Missing Menu | Nominated | |
| 2019 | 21st Taipei Film Awards | Best Supporting Actor | The Scoundrels | Nominated | |
| 2023 | 58th Golden Bell Awards | Best Male Lead in a Television Series | Taiwan Crime Stories | Nominated | |
| 2024 | 28th Asian Television Awards | Best Actor | Taiwan Crime Stories | Won | |
| 2024 | 26th Taipei Film Awards | Best Actor | A Boy and A Girl | Nominated | |
| 2024 | 26th Taipei Film Awards | Best Supporting Actor | Fish Memories | Nominated | |
| 2024 | 59th Golden Bell Awards | Best Leading Actor in a Miniseries or Television Film | Night Blindness | Nominated | |
| 2024 | 29th Asian Television Awards | Best Actor | Night Blindness | Nominated | |
