= Breaking and Re-entering =

2024 Taiwanese comedy-action film by Wang Ding-lin

- Directed by: Wang Ding-lin
- Written by: Wang Hui-chu; Wang Ding-lin; Wen Yu-fang
- Produced by: Yeh Ju-feng
- Starring: Chen Bo-lin; Cecilia Choi
- Cinematography: Garvin Chan
- Edited by: Kipo Lin
- Music by: Chris Hou
- Production company: Mandarin Vision
- Distributed by: Netflix
- Release date: 8 February 2024
- Country: Taiwan
- Languages: Southern Min; Mandarin

Breaking and Re-entering is a 2024 Taiwanese comedy-action film directed by Wang Ding-lin, starring Chen Bolin, Cecilia Choi, and Wu Kang-ren. The film was released in Taiwan on February 8, 2024.

== Plot ==
The film follows the story of Chang Po-chun, a charismatic leader of a group of bank robbers, who sets out to steal a large sum of money from a prominent financial institution run by Chen Hai-jui. However, things take an unexpected turn when he discovers that his former girlfriend, Shen Shu-wen, works at the same bank. This unexpected twist leads Po-chun to concoct a plan to return the stolen funds through an unconventional method, adding a comedic spin to the traditional heist film.

== Cast ==
- Chen Bolin as Chang Po-chun
- Cecilia Choi as Shen Shu-wen
- Kent Tsai as Kao
- Frederick Lee as Uncle Bin
- Wu Kang-ren as Chen Hai-jui

== Release ==
Breaking and Re-entering was released in Taiwan on February 8, 2024. It had its North American premiere at the New York Asian Film Festival on July 22, 2024, and was later picked up for distribution by Netflix.

== Reception ==
On the review aggregator website Rotten Tomatoes, 80% of 5 critics' reviews are positive, with an average rating of 7/10.

Writing for the South China Morning Post, James Marsh gave the film three and a half out of five stars, saying, "The bank heist has been a tried and tested movie trope for as long as the medium has been around, and Wang plunders many of the genre’s finest examples to colour his polished, playful thriller. ... [It's] a consistently entertaining romp, rich in broad laughs and sentimental romance, that never threatens to outstay its welcome."

Rob Hunter of Film School Rejects wrote, "Wang keeps things moving at a real clip — another reason the film stays so light as there’s little time for anything deeper or heavier — and, as with the Soderbergh heist films that inspired him, he loads the back end with rewinds, flashbacks, spring forwards, and more. ... It wouldn’t work in a serious thriller, but the visual gags and narrative nonsense help deliver a goofily entertaining (reverse) heist flick."
