= Summer Brothers =

- 羽过天晴
- Directed by: Simon Long
- Starring: William San; Coby Chong; Remon Lim
- Country of origin: Malaysia
- Original language: Mandarin
- No. of episodes: 30

Production
- Running time: approx. 45 minutes

Original release
- Network: ntv7
- Release: 12 July – 6 September 2012

Related
- Unriddle 2; Justice In The City; Forget Me Not (2011)

Summer Brothers <<羽过天晴>> is a spin-off of TV series Forget Me Not, Summer Brothers reunites some original cast members such as Coby Chong, who plays Ah Di, a 28-year-old with a mentality of a 7-year-old, William San (Ah Di's brother Wei Zhong) and Remon Lim (Shu Xian, their mother).

== Plot ==
Set against the backdrop of Malaysia's favourite sport, Badminton, Summer Brothers chronicles the lives of long lost brothers, Wei Zhong and Ah Di, played by William and Coby, who were separated after the divorce of their parents 20 years ago. Ah Di who was diagnosed with mental disability when he was young, lives a poor but happy and peaceful life with his mother, Shu Xian (Remon). When Ah Di's mother finds out that she is about to die from her terminal cancer, she decides to unite the brothers. However, she lost Ah Di during their journey to Kuala Lumpur in search of his older brother. Ah Di is stranded but made new friends with Xiao Mei (Lim Jing Miao), a kind and naïve girl. With the uncanny rapport between them, the two become instant bosom buddies.

Xiao Mei's parents died in a car accident and both she and her younger brother, Yu Cheng (Adrian) are forced to board at their relative's home. The siblings suffer through their dependence on others, but for the sake of his older sister, Yu Cheng endures the hardships thrown at him. Yu Cheng is a top student who has just graduated from school, but in order to make ends meet, he is forced to quit his studies to work. His only wish is none other than gaining independence to support his sister. Ah Di is envious of Xiao Mei and Yu Cheng's relationship, which makes him reminisce the childhood spent with his brother.

Meanwhile, Ah Di's mother manages to locate Wei Zhong and informs him about Ah Di's disappearance. Wei Zhong is not only unmoved by the news, but has no intention to reunite with his brother. Many years ago, Wei Zhong encountered an accident that caused an irreversible injury, forcing him to give up badminton forever, while allowing his main rival and best friend, Qi Jun (Johnson) to not only step up but also end up marrying his college sweetheart, Chen Rou (Stella).

Distraught at his sudden loss of ability, Wei Zhong becomes dispirited and losing his purpose to live. Over the years, Wei Zhong meets his guardian angel, Rui Li (Jojo) who took care of him after his accident. A nurse by profession, Rui Li is the only one who stood by his side no matter what happens, appearing firsthand to help solve his problems. Secretly, Rui Li likes Wei Zhong, and Wei Zhong is dependent on Rui Li. The two maintain an ambiguous relationship.

When Rui Li learns about Ah Di, she urges Wei Zhong not to abandon his younger brother, as he recalls the unpleasant memories of their past. When their parents divorced, his mother took custody of Ah Di and left him with his estranged father, who indulged relentlessly in alcohol, neglecting his older son. Wei Zhong cannot fathom his mother's decision to abandon him for his younger brother and holds contempt towards her and Ah Di.

Shu Xian's illness is getting bad to worse, and she feels bad when she still couldn't find Ah Di and also get Wei Zhong's forgiveness. Rui Li emphatises Shu Xian and vows to tries her very best to find back Ah Di as well as resolves the hatred deep in Wei Zhong.

Meanwhile, Xiao Mei's kindness to help Ah Di provoked anger in their relatives, who chase them out of their house, leaving them homeless overnight. Yu Cheng, together with Xiao Mei and Ah Di wander aimlessly in the streets. Ah Di, remorseful of the situation he has caused everyone, makes a vow to convince his older brother to take in Xiao Mei and Yu Cheng when they reunite. On the verge of total despair, fate brings Ah Di to Wei Zhong and is also forced to take in Xiao Mei and Yu Cheng.

Wei Zhong is not trilled as he feels that he is forced to stay with three total strangers. Unable to comprehend Wei Zhong's disdain towards him, Ah Di feels deeply hurt and disappointed that his older brother is different. Forced to take in his mentally disabled brother and share his life with two strangers, Wei Zhong finds it difficult to come to terms with the sudden change in his life.

Meanwhile, Yu Cheng recognises Wei Zhong as an ex-national badminton player but is disdained with Wei Zhong's attitude towards his own life and brother. Unlike Wei Zhong, Yu Cheng works hard and manages to get a spot in the prestigious badminton training academy and hopes to be trained by Qi Jun. Qi Jun admires his talent but he still has his reservations towards Yu Cheng after knowing Wei Zhong's relation with Yu Cheng. After Wei Zhong's defeat, Qi Jun's career in badminton soared to great heights. But despite his success in career, his marriage to Chen Rou is unfulfilling as the latter could not forget her former love, Wei Zhong. This makes Qi Jun indignant. Sensing how dispirited his brother is, Ah Di hopes to encourage his brother with badminton, hoping to regain his confidence and pick up his life once more. Ah Di tries many ways to encourage his brother and finally Wei Zhong is touched by Ah Di's sincerity. He discards his previous lazy, unmotivated self and returns to the badminton arena, wanting to regain what he has lost. Wei Zhong's comeback threatens Qi Jun. On the surface Qi Jun is warm and welcoming towards Wei Zhong and shows enthusiasm toward the prospect of training Yu Cheng. Qi Jun plots to defeat Wei Zhong again by making him fail in court.

Both Yu Cheng and his best friend Zi Yun (Kyo) fall in love with Qi Jun's sister, Yu Min (Mayjune). Qi Jun uses this and made the two best friends into enemies, which both later battle it out on the badminton court. Xiao Mei is worry about Yu Cheng, hoping to talk him out of Qi Jun's badminton team. Yu Cheng refuses as this is his best chance to go further in the sports and begins to see Xiao Mei as his obstacle to success.

Over time, Wei Zhong has grown fond of Xiao Mei and Yu Cheng. Seeing the rupture between the siblings affects him. Turning over a new leaf, Wei Zhong discards his previous lazy, unmotivated self and works hard to get Yu Cheng into his team. Rui Li stands by his side to boost his confidence, thereby solidifying their feelings for each other. However, right when he finds his footing back in life, Wei Zhong is struck by the news of Ah Di is being diagnosed with cancer.

== Cast ==
Cast	Role	Description
William San	Wei Zhong	Ex-national badminton player Older brother to Ah Di; Shu Xian's older son
Coby Chong	Ah Di	28-year-old with a mentality of a 7-year-old Younger brother to Wei Zhong; Shu Xian's younger son
Renon Lim	Shu Xian	Wei Zhong and Ah Di's mother
Jojo Goh	Rui Li	Wei Zhong's lover Nurse
Adrian Tan	Yu Cheng	Brother to Xiao Mei
Lim Jing Miao	Xiao Mei	Sister of Yu Cheng
Kyo Chen	Zi Yun	
Mayjune Tan	Yu Min	Qi Jun's sister
Wong Mew Choo	Women coach	Guest appearance
Johnson Low	Qi Jun	Yu Min's brother
Stella Chung	Chen Rou	Badminton player
