= Debbie Goh =

Malaysian actress

- 吴天瑜
- Born: Goh Seok Sim (吴淑心); November 8, 1978 (age 47); Johor Bahru, Johor, Malaysia
- Occupation: actress
- Years active: 2005–present
- Children: Danton Lee (son)
- Awards: Golden Awards; Most Popular Actress (2014)

Chinese name
- Traditional Chinese: 吳天瑜
- Simplified Chinese: 吴天瑜
Transcriptions
Standard Mandarin
- Hanyu Pinyin: Wú Tiānyú

Debbie Goh (born Goh Seok Sim; 8 November 1978) is a Malaysian film and television actor. Goh is the former Miss Malaysia Chinese International 1998 and a Malaysia artiste.

== Background ==
She stepped into the spotlight when she won the first Miss Malaysia Chinese International beauty pageant in 1999. At 19, while studying in Singapore, Goh was spotted and asked to model. She was then scouted to join the Hong Kong film production company, Golden Harvest, for a five-year contract. That was when she accepted an offer by Hong Kong pay-TV station, i-CABLE News Channel, to be a TV presenter.

She is the co-owner of the IR1968 Indonesian restaurant in Kuala Lumpur.

== Awards ==
=== Golden Awards ===
- 2010: Most Popular Actress
- 2012: Most Popular Actress
- 2014: Best Actress & Most Popular Actress (Top 5)

=== Bella Awards ===
- 2013: Bella On-screen Award

== Filmography ==
=== Television dramas ===
Year	Title	Original Title	Role	Network	Awards	Notes
2008	Age of Glory	情牽南苑爱	Lin Yu Lan (Rose)	NTV7	Nominated: Golden Awards–Best Actress	
2010	The Descendant	香火	Xie Yuhua	NTV7		
2010	Age Of Glory 2	情牵南洋	Ye Feng	NTV7		
2012	Glowing Embers	炭鄉	Yao Feng	NTV7		
2012	Mining Magnate	半边天	Luo Lin (Lorraine)	NTV7		
2013	The Legend of Kublai Khan	忽必烈傳奇/建元風雲	Qaimish	HBS		
2022	Cook Vs Chef	幸福年菜斗厨艺	(Guest Judge) Herself	8TV		

=== Film ===
Year	Title	Original Title	Role	Other notes
2000	Skyline Cruisers		Apple	
2006	Nothing Is Impossible	情意拳拳	Mango	
2013	Bringing Joy Home 2013			
2014	Spring Chorus	忆起回家	Fanny Tang	
2014	Bullets Over Petaling Street	茨厂街女王	Yu Ping An (Angel)	
2016	Lost in the Pacific	蒸发太平洋	Yang Lin Lin (Lily Young)	
