= Taiwan Crime Stories =

Taiwanese television series

Chinese name
- Traditional Chinese: 台灣犯罪故事
Transcriptions
Standard Mandarin
- Hanyu Pinyin: Táiwān fànzuì gùshì
- Genre: Crime thriller
- Starring: Rhydian Vaughan; Wang Po-chieh; Vivian Sung
- Country of origin: Taiwan
- Original languages: Mandarin, Hokkien
- No. of seasons: 1
- No. of episodes: 12

Production
- Producers: Ron Howard; Brian Grazer; Cora Yim; Benjamin Lin
- Running time: 44-61 minutes
- Production companies: CalFilms Asia; Imagine Entertainment; Sixty Percent Productions

Original release
- Network: Disney+ Star+ Hulu
- Release: 4 January – 25 January 2023

Taiwan Crime Stories (Chinese: 台灣犯罪故事; pinyin: Táiwān fànzuì gùshì) is a 2023 Taiwanese television series produced by CalFilms Asia, Imagine Entertainment and Sixty Percent Productions for the Walt Disney Company. The series premiered on January 4, 2023, as an original through Disney+ via Star.

== Synopsis ==
Based on true events that happened in Taiwan, the series Taiwan Crime Stories tells of four criminal cases, each spanning three episodes.

== Cast ==
=== Case One ===
Role	Actor/Actress
Yu Chen-lang	Rhydian Vaughan
Chiu Wen-qing	Allison Lin
Lin Xue-qing	Hsueh Shih-ling
Lin Xue-wen	Patrick Shih
Zhao Yan-jie	Shih Ming-shuai

=== Case Two ===
Role	Actor/Actress
Lee Bo-sheng	Wang Po-chieh
Shen Chang-rong	Frederick Lee

=== Case Three ===
Role	Actor/Actress
Wang Ying-min	Chen Yi-wen
Wang Yu-xuan / Wang Zhong-hui	Vivian Sung

=== Case Four ===
Role	Actor/Actress
Cheung Ming-jie	Fu Meng-po
Kao Yan-zhen	Patty Lee
Cheung Ming-shing	Kent Tsai
