= Glowing Embers =

- 炭鄉
- Starring: Henley Hii; Debbie Goh; Wymen Yang; Frederick Lee; Melvin Sia
- Country of origin: Malaysia
- Original languages: Mandarin; Cantonese
- No. of episodes: 24

Production
- Running time: 60 minutes (approx.)

Original release
- Network: ntv7
- Release: 9 March – 19 April 2010

Related
- Friends Forever; The Glittering Days

Glowing Embers is a Malaysian television series co-produced by ntv7 and Double Vision. This 24 episode drama serial tells of a small town, Kuala Sepetang, charcoal production business. Fei Long, Ah Koo, Yi Yi, Fat Miao, and Ah Dong are a group of childhood friends who grow up together there, where their playground were the charcoal kilns, the mangrove, rivers and traditional boat factories. It was aired every Monday to Thursday, at 10:00 pm on Malaysia's ntv7 starting 9 March 2010.

== Cast ==
- Henley Hii as Fei Long
- Debbie Goh
- Frederick Lee
- Melvin Sia
- Wymen Yang
