= You Mean the World to Me (film) =

- Directed by: Saw Teong Hin
- Screenplay by: Saw Teong Hin
- Based on: Hai Ki Xin Lor; 2014 stage play by Saw Teong Hin
- Starring: Yeo Yann Yann; Steve Yap; Chelsia Ng; Neo Swee Lin; Frederick Lee; Gregg Koay
- Cinematography: Christopher Doyle
- Production company: Astro Shaw
- Distributed by: Good Move Media
- Release dates: 4 May 2017 (Malaysia); 5 October 2017 (Singapore (Taiwanese Mandarin Audio))
- Running time: 96 minutes
- Country: Malaysia
- Language: Penang Hokkien

You Mean the World to Me (Chinese: 海墘新路; Tâi-lô: Hái-Kînn Sin-Lōo) is a 2017 Malaysian semi-autobiographical drama film directed and written by Saw Teong Hin, based on his stage play. The film, set in 1970s Penang, is the first Malaysian film that is entirely in Penang Hokkien. The film's Chinese name, 海墘新路 (Hái-Kînn Sin-Lōo), refers to a Hokkien nickname for Victoria Street in George Town, Penang.

== Cast ==
- Yeo Yann Yann as Hoon
- Steve Yap as Father
- Chelsia Ng as Vivian
- Neo Swee Lin as Cheng
- Frederick Lee as Sunny
- Gregg Koay as Young Sunny
- Yee Min Eng as Young Hoon
- Ai Suan Tan as Old Vivian
- John Tan as Ah Boy

== Development ==
The film's script was written based on Saw's family history and his estranged relationship with his mother. After the script was finished, Saw had desires of turning it into a film but lacked enough money to do so. He presented the script to several parties who were interested in the project but they had conditioned that the film be made in Mandarin instead, to which Saw refused. Thus, he decided that the script be made into a stage play first. The play, under the name of Hai Ki Xin Lor, was held in 2014 during the George Town Festival to receptive audiences. The success of the play helped open doors for him to get funds to turn the play into a feature film.

=== Music ===
The film's theme song, "感謝妳 (Kám-siā Lí/Kám-siā Lú)" was performed by Taiwanese singer Chao Chuan.

== Awards ==
Year	Award	Category	Recipient(s) and nominee(s)	Result
2017	29th Malaysia Film Festival	Best Screenplay	Saw Teong Hin	Won
2017	29th Malaysia Film Festival	Best Music Score	David Koon Wei Gee	Won
2017	29th Malaysia Film Festival	Best New Actor	John Tan	Won
