= Chalanggai =

Malaysian Tamil-language family drama film

- Theatrical release poster
- Directed by: Deepak Kumaran Menon
- Screenplay by: Vimala Perumal; Deepak Kumaran Menon; Sooria Kumari
- Produced by: Vimala Perumal
- Starring: Dhaarshini Sankran; Ramesh Kumar; Kalpana Sundraju; Shangkara
- Cinematography: Albert Hue
- Edited by: Deepak Kumaran Menon
- Music by: Hardesh Singh
- Production companies: One Hundred Eye; MyFoto Studio
- Release dates: 3 February 2007 (Rotterdam); July 2007 (Theatrical)
- Running time: 98 minutes
- Country: Malaysia
- Languages: Tamil; Malay; Mandarin; English

Chalanggai (Dancing Bells) is a 2007 Malaysian Tamil-language family drama film directed by Deepak Kumar Menon, who co-wrote the film alongside producer Vimala Perumal and Sooria Kumari. The film stars Dhaarshini Sankran, Ramesh Kumar, Kalpana Sundraju and Shangkara.

The film had a limited release in Malaysia and was screened in various film festivals worldwide.

== Plot ==
Set in Brickfields, Kuala Lumpur, the film follows an Indian family after father Raja leaves his family leaving mother Muniammah to support her two kids with her flower stall. Her 11-year-old daughter Uma has aspirations to become a dancer despite her mother's inhibitions. She also has a son Siva who washes car as a living and has materialistic aspirations.

== Cast ==
- Dhaarshini Sankran as Uma
- Ramesh Kumar as Siva
- Kalpana Sundraju as Muniammah
- Bala Sundram @ Roy as Kali
- Shangkara as Raja
- Ramli Ibrahim
- Gandhi Nathan
- Amir Muhammad
- Suganthan Periasamy
- Bosco Raju
- Sooria Kumari
- Lim Eng Beng
- Devamalar Kathan

== Production ==
Deepak Kumar Menon based the film on real life happenings in his life such as losing friends due to accidents, alcohol, suicides or murders. The film was partly funded through the National Geographic through their Seed Grant.

== Reception ==
Reviewing the film at the International Film Festival Rotterdam, Jay Weissburg of Variety wrote, "Current pic[ture] uses the aspirations of a young girl from a broken home to comment on minorities coping with urban marginalization, but Menon’s approach is far from polemical, and his narrative skills often too piecemeal to create a lasting impression. “Dancing Bells” sounds a pleasant but weak note for Malaysian cinema, likely to capture local attention but only intermittent fest play". GjZ, reviewing the film at the same film festival wrote, "Menon draws a beautifully realistic and detailed portrait of a family that has to survive and above all has to maintain its dignity. [...] This makes Dancing Bells not only authentic, but also emotional. These are real feelings of real people portrayed in a realistic way".

Netherlands-based film curator Gertjan Zuilhof wrote that the film is a "[b]eautiful artistic portrait of a family that has to survive and above all maintain its dignity". Hong Kong-based film curator Jacob Wong wrote that the film is a "[n]aturalistic feature [that] reveals a minority under stress in the shadows of a developing Malaysia".

== Accolades and selections ==
=== Accolades ===
- 20th Malaysia Film Festival - Best Digital Film
- 36th International Film Festival Rotterdam - NETPAC Special Mention
- Tokyo International Film Festival - Special Mention
- 9th Osian's Cinefan Festival of Asian and Arab Cinema - NETPAC Best Film

=== Selections ===
The film was screened at various film festivals in Asia, Europe, Africa and the Americas.

- Busan International Film Festival 2007
- 5th Bangkok International Film Festival
- Rio de Janeiro International Film Festival
