= Ruby Yap =

Chinese actress

- 叶俞均（狄妃）
- Born: 28 December 1991 (age 34); Kuala Lumpur, Malaysia
- Education: Diploma in Mass Communication (Public Relations), Tunku Abdul Rahman College
- Occupations: Actress; Singer; Host
- Years active: 2012–present
- Notable credit(s): The Driver (2020); Fly By Night (2019); Think Big Big (2018); May I Love You (2018); Million Loves In Me (2018)
- Partner(s): Stannis Kok (manager); Secret Fox Entertainment (M) Sdn Bhd (2017-2022)
- Awards: Malaysia Asli Drama Award; Best Leading Actress; 2016 The Dawns Here Are Quiet

Chinese name
- Chinese: 叶俞均（狄妃）
Transcriptions
Standard Mandarin
- Hanyu Pinyin: Yè Yú Jūn (Dī Fēi)
Yue: Cantonese
- Jyutping: Dik6 Fei1
Southern Min
- Hokkien POJ: Te̍k-hui
- Website: Ruby Faye on Facebook; Ruby Faye on Instagram; Ruby Faye at IMDb; Ruby Faye Youtube

Ruby Yap (叶俞均; born 28 December 1991) is a Malaysian-born Chinese feature film, drama series, theatre drama and radio drama all-round actress and singer. Ruby made a successful transition to theatre drama stage performance, winning a "Best Actress in a Leading Role" award in 2016 in the 13th Malaysia Asli Drama Awards (ADA). She won it for her role in the critically acclaimed Soviet war drama "The Dawns Here Are Quiet" based on Boris Vasilyev's novel of the same name.

She achieved international recognition when she portrayed Cindy, a lawyer assistant who stands up for justice in the independent Hong Kong film Million Loves in Me, receiving an "Award of Merit for Supporting Actress" in The IndieFest Film Award 2017 at San Diego, California and "Award of Excellence for Supporting Actress" in Depth of Field International Film Festival 2017 in Delaware, USA. Ruby garnered further recognition for her "Best Supporting Actress" award in the Hollywood International Moving Pictures Film Festival (HIMPFF) in 2017 and "The Best Supporting Actress" in the 2019 North Europe International Film Festival. In 2017, Ruby Faye released her first single Who Am I, and produced a musical theater "90's" as a warm-up promo for her upcoming debut EP mini-album.

== Acting career ==
Ruby was the youngest nominee of Best Actress for her first short film The Wither of Sprout in BMW Shorties 2011. Belonging to Malaysia's new generation of artists, she was invited to join the domestic Chinese drama industry, where she further broadened her artistic skills by trying her hand at acting. She played in The Undercover alongside Malaysia TV channel NTV7 top 10 artist Adrian Tan, and later caught viewers' attention during her debut drama serial, playing the role of a teens prostitute and a young killer in Pianissimo.

Ruby was nominated as one of the top 5 in the Best Newcomer category in NTV7 Golden Awards 2014 in which will be held at Putrajaya International convention Centre on 20 September 2014.

Besides, she has selected as one of the supporting cast by the winner of 30th Hong Kong Film Awards Best Actor Nick Cheung in his directorial debut film "The Hungry Ghost Ritual", released in the year 2014. In 2014, Ruby became the 2nd lead actress in NTV7 Chinese drama "The Scavenger". In 2015, Ruby is invited by Hong Kong film director Clifton Ko as special appearance guest actress for his directed musical theatre "Shooting Star" in Malaysia. In the same year, Ruby is selected by Beijing-based theatre director Dr. Deric Gan to take part in his theatre production with Russia well-known novel The Dawns Here Are Quiet. Ruby is the main cast and she was playing a tragic figure, the complicated beautiful soldier Zhenya Komelkowa.

Ruby has worked with directors and artists including Clifton Ko Chi-Sum (Hong Kong), Nick Cheung Ka-Fai (Hong Kong), Chiu Keng Guan (Malaysia), Ho Yu Hang (Malaysia), Xie Xiaodong (China), Zahir Omar (Malaysia), Dr. Deric Gan (Malaysia), Patrick Yau Tat-Chi (Hong Kong), Sam Loh (Singapore), Sampson Yuen (Hong Kong), Chan Wai Cheong (Malaysia), and Edmund Yeo (Malaysia).

Ruby has worked with well-known actors and actresses such as Nick Cheung Ka-Fai (Hong Kong), Simon Yam (Hong Kong), Annie Liu (Taiwan), Huang CaiLun (China), Lo Koon Lan (Hong Kong), Wu Bai (Taiwan), Kaiser Chuang (Taiwan), Shiou Chieh Kai (Taiwan), Landy Wen (Taiwan), Mimi Chu (Hong Kong), Jordan Voon (Malaysia), etc.

== Environmental advocate ==
Ruby was named a Program Artiste Ambassador for JCI Entrepreneur Malaysia in February 2015 with a special focus of promoting green revival- save the earth.

She was also selected by Magnum & Mega Ultimate for Green Revival 2016 in Malaysia.

== Filmography ==
=== Film ===
Year	Title	Role	Director	Notes
2012	Ah Gu 阿古的故事	Ah Mei	Chan Wai Cheong	
2013	Twilight Murderer 迷離凶影	Janice	Gu Loong	TV film
2013	Original Sin 原罪	Yang Yu Ying	Jackson	TV film
2014	Finding Lion King 天下第一獅	Zheng Mei	Chew Huat Yeow	TV film
2014	Kiasu 做你愛做的事	Mei Ling	Law Gwo Yunn	Co-production between Taiwan & Malaysia
2014	Hungry Ghost Ritual 盂蘭神功	Ah Mun	Nick Cheung	Co-production between Hong Kong & Malaysia
2016	Mrs K	Fong	Ho Yuhang	Co-production between Hong Kong & Malaysia
2017	Million Loves in Me 寵我	Cindy	Sampson Yuen	Hong Kong Indie film
2017	All My Goddess 女人永遠是對的	Receptionist	Clifton Ko	Hong Kong Film
2017	We, the Dead 阿奇洛	Qi Qi	Edmund Yeo	Malaysia Feature Film
2018	Think Big Big 大大噠	Ice	Chiu Keng Guan	Malaysia Feature Film
2019	Fly By Night 非常盗	Michelle	Zahir Omar	Malaysia Feature Film
2019	Before I Sleep 再憶起	A-Faye	Alan Foo	TV film
2020	Policewoman 霹雳霸王花	Lee	Bowie Liu	China Web Film
2020	Water in the Broken Basket 撈世界	special appearance	Xie XiaoDong	China Feature Film

=== Television series ===
Year	Title	Role	Broadcaster	Notes
2013	The Undercover 無間行者	Ah Ying	NTV7	Cameo role
2013	Brilliant Flowers 春花燦爛		TV2	Cameo Role
2013	The Liar 說謊者	Emily	NTV7	Column Leading Role
2013	Pianissimo 聽風的歌	Young Lady Fang Ru Yen	NTV7	Supporting role
2014	Seven Days 七天	Teng Teng	Astro Xiao Tai Yang	Cameo Role
2014	We Are Young 我們正年輕	Jamie	TV2	2nd Leading Role
2014	The Scavenger 千門八將	Ruby Lin ShiShi	NTV7	2nd Leading Role
2018	Persona 2 假面2	Chloe	8TV	Column Main Role
2018	Gifted 天之驕子	Ella	Mediacorp Channel 8	special appearance
2019	Missing in Possible 陰陽大轉移	Lau Kar Ling	TV2	1st Leading Role

=== Web Drama ===
Year	Title	Role	Broadcaster	Notes
2017	May I Love You 本來只想暗戀你	Xing Nan	XUAN	Main role
2018	May I Love You 2 本來只想暗戀你 2	Xing Nan	XUAN	Main role
2020	The Driver 伺機	Adele	Mediacorp Channel 8	Main role

=== Theatre ===
Year	Title	Role	Director	Notes
2015	Shooting Star	Special appearance	Clifton Ko	Musical Theatre
2015	The Dawns Here Are Quiet	Zhenya Komelkowa	Dr. Deric Gan	13th ADA Drama Award 2016 - The Best Actress in Leading Role
2016	Don't Let Shakespeare Know - The Tempest	Caliban	Easee Gan	
2016	Richard III	Lady Anne, Little Elizabeth, Killer, messenger, guard, servant, palace lady, dancer, musician, citizen of London	Dr. Deric Gan	
2017	35	Girl Friend	Ye Wei Liang	
2017	90 Musical	Jolin Hou	Milo Liew	Produced by Stannis Kok & Ruby Yap
2017	Peking Man	Zeng RuiZhen	Dr. Deric Gan	
2019	Don't Let Usman Awang Know - Udara	Zhu Ying Tai	Easee Gan	

=== Short film ===
- 2011: The Wither of Sprout
- 2012: Love Lane
- 2017: Departure . A Sunny Day 出發·在晴朗的一天 (<Light & Shadow·Macau> Micro Film Creative Competition Champion)

=== TV Host ===
- 2012: Fun Journey 東南西北三人行
- 2015: You Can't Guess Me 估我唔到
- 2016: JOOX Music Walker

=== TVC ===
- 2014: b.liv absolute matte
- 2017: CellLabs Classaanta CNY online adv
- 2017: YES Academy online short film
- 2017: RT Pastry House commercial short Adv
- 2017: Panasonic Malaysia Sky Series Info TVC
- 2020: DAIKIN Malaysia CNY short film（The Twins）

== Music ==
=== Music album ===
Ruby's first album of the same name is a collection of three songs selected from the musical [90], "Who Am I", "90G", "Dream" and a new original song called "Gone", a mini album organized into a rich piece of music. Ruby Faye album is produced by Hanz Kuok, a famous young singer and composer in Malaysia, and Asia famous composer Percy Phang is the consulting music producer. The album was official released on 6 June 2018.

=== Single ===
- 2018: Story Teller - Ruby Faye
- 2018: Dream - Ruby Faye
- 2018: Gone - Ruby Faye
- 2017: 90G - Ruby Faye
- 2017: Who AM I - Ruby Faye

=== Featuring (EP) ===
- 2015: Hi Bye - Fayse Goh feat. Ruby Yap

== Others ==
=== Emcee ===
- 2015: MCC Korea Brand Cosmetic & Beauty 1st Flagship Grand Opening
- 2016: 13th ADA Drama Award
- 2017: I have a date with teacher Annual Dinner by SRJK (C) Kepong 1 & Kepong 2
- 2017: Jyn Chiu's Music Album Media Conference

=== Music - Singing Performance ===
- 2012: Miss International Model Yacht Malaysia
- 2013: Malaysia Chinese Qi Pao Beauty Pageant
- 2013: MY ASTRO全民迎新Ulala
- 2014: Loud Speaker 6th Flagship Grand Opening
- 2015: Zero Limits x Merdeka Madness Music Festival Penang
- 2015: Joey Leong 21st Birthday Mini-Concert
- 2017: Asia Muse Girl Search Grand Final
- 2017: 30-Hour Famine DIY Camp - First City UC (23/7)
- 2017: 30-Hour Famine DIY Camp - Taylor Lakeside University (29/7)
- 2017: 30-Hour Famine DIY Camp - Help National University (29/7)
- 2017: 30-Hour Famine World Vision Malaysia - (30/7)
- 2018: ASTRO Chinese New Year Whoopee Countdown Show - 迎春接福大慶典 (15/2)
- 2018: Face of Asia-Pacific (13/4)
- 2018: Sing!China – Malaysia Final- Star Challenge Team (19/5)
- 2018: 30-Hour Famine DIY Camp - SJKC Chin Kwang Wahyu (9/6)
- 2018: The Ultimate Jazz by Calmeraft. Ruby (21/7)
- 2018: Influencers Festival (22/9)
- 2018: Tremella Global Product Launch Annual Nite (14/11)

=== Judge ===
- 2015: Mega Ultimate K'Storm KPOP Dance Cover Competition Grand Final

== Awards/Achievement ==
=== Drama ===
Year	Event	Title	Name	Character	outcome
2011	1st Malaysia BMW Shorties	Best Actress in Leading Role	《The Wither of Sprout》	Ye Yu jun	Nominated
2014	3rd NTV7 Golden Awards	Best Newcomer	《The Undercover》	Ah Yeng	Nominated
2014	3rd NTV7 Golden Awards	The Most Favorite Female Artist			Nominated
2016	13th Asli Drama Award (ADA)	Best Actress in Leading Role	《The Dawns Here Are Quiet》	Zhenya Komelkowa	Won
2017	The IndieFEST Film Award	Award of Merit - Supporting Actress	《Million Loves in Me》	Cindy	Won
2017	Depth of Field International Film Festival Competition	Award of Excellence - Supporting Actress	《Million Loves in Me》	Cindy	Won
2017	Hollywood International Moving Pictures Film Festival (HIMPFF)	Award of Recognition - Supporting Actress	《Million Loves in Me》	Cindy	Won
2017	Accolade Global Film Competition	Award of Merit - Supporting Actress	《Million Loves in Me》	Cindy	Won
2018	15th Asli Drama Award (ADA)	Best Actress in Leading Role	《90 Musical》	Jolin Hou	Nominated
2018	Nice International Film festival	Best Actress in Leading Role	《Million Loves in Me》	Cindy	Nominated
2019	North Europe International Film festival	Best Actress in Leading Role	《Million Loves in Me》	Cindy	Won

=== Music ===
Year	Event	Title	Song Name	Outcome
2017	NEWAY K Music Awards	My Favourite Outstanding Newcomer Award		Nominated
2018	NEWAY K Music Awards	NEWAY Advocating the Great Leap Forward Female Singer Award		Won

=== Business ===
Year	Event	Title	Outcome
2018	Grandeur & Elegante International Business Award	The International Personality Award	Won

=== Fashion ===
Year	Event	Title	Outcome
2018	Asia Model Festival: Face of Asia-Pacific	Celebrity Star Award	Won

=== Audience Choice ===
Year	Event	Title	Name	Character	outcome
2018	Malaysia Weibo.com	May I Love You Most Popular Artiste	《May I Love You 2》	Xing Nan	Won
