= Shun Pong O =

2018 Malaysian romantic comedy film

- Film poster
- Directed by: David Thian
- Starring: Shinny Tan; Kim Ho Won; Sherlyn Seo; Philip Keong; Phoebe Ooi; Jin Ju Hyung
- Production company: DAA Production Sdn Bhd
- Distributed by: Mega Films Distribution Sdn Bhd
- Release date: 10 May 2018
- Running time: 110 minutes
- Country: Malaysia

Shun Pong O (Chinese: 顺风鱼) is a Malaysian romantic comedy film.
