= Age of Glory 2 =

2010 Chinese TV series

- 情牵南洋
- Genre: Period Drama
- Directed by: Simon Long/ Ho Chee Wai/ Ko Wai/ Chan Wai Cheang
- Starring: Debbie Goh; Leslie Chai; Aenie Wong; Fredrick Lee
- Opening theme: 流连 (Liu Lian) by Cai Ke Li (蔡珂立) and Luo Yi Si (罗忆诗)
- Country of origin: Malaysia
- Original languages: Chinese, English, Malay, Japanese
- No. of episodes: 40

Production
- Producer: Double Vision Sdn Bhd
- Running time: 60 minutes (approx.)

Original release
- Network: ntv7
- Release: 2010 – 2010

Related
- Age of Glory

Age of Glory 2 (simplified Chinese: 情牵南洋; traditional Chinese: 情牽南洋; pinyin: qíng qiān nán yang) is a Chinese drama series which is co-produce by Double Vision and ntv7. It is telecast on every Monday to Thursday, at 10 pm on ntv7.

== History ==
When Age of Glory was first aired in 2008, it unexpectedly became a big hit among local television viewers in Malaysia. The locally produced drama series garnered a record viewership of 800,000, making it the highest-rated local Chinese series for the year across all free-to-air TV channels in the country.

== Synopsis ==
Age of Glory 2 is ntv7's first extravagant locally produced TV series in 2010. The filming works started on 1 March 2010 in Penang. The 40-episode full-length TV nostalgia spans three decades, from the late 1930s to the late 1960s. A total amount of RM3 million was invested in this movie which was filmed in Penang, Taiping, Kuala Selangor and Seremban.

Set in the 1940s, the plot fell between 1938 and 1968, described Malaya in that 30 years, with the turbulent situation in World War II era, the ancestors worked hard from the south of China, where the roots of the hard stories Malaysia will certainly be nostalgic whirlwind television fad, pulling the audience into the various memorable old Nanyang feelings!

Three men will tell how to their life changes from China to Malaysia. The audience this year is certainly will be served with the most anticipated local television production.

Age of Glory 2 is the story about the time when mainland China was in turmoil. The three hardships are Japanese invasion of China, Kuomintang civil strife and inflation. This has led the people from China to emigrate.

At that time, the British were still ruling Malaya, a country rich in natural resources. Malaya has attracted many foreign investors. That's when the British-appointed Chinese leaders – Kapitan. Due to that, exploitation by British had been done to emigrants in labour work, covering mining tin, tapping, port coolies, etc.

Age of Glory 2 lets the audience discover the hardship of Ma Ying (Li Ming Zhong), Yapa (Cai Ke Li) and Lin Sheng (Wu Weibin) leaving home for Malaya to find a new life, and experience difficulty in the Second World War, Japanese and British occupation days, and until the independence of Malaya. They will also met their true love, Ye Feng (Wu Tianyu), Zheng Peiqi (Shujun) and Qi Wan Yue (Hishiko Wu Pei). They will experience the ups and downs of life, sadness, hardships, and some realising their dream.

The show has attracted huge audience and outstanding review among the Malaysian audience.

== Casts ==
=== Main cast ===
Cast	Role	Description
Frederick Lee	Ma Ying Jie	origins from Anxi, Quanzhou, Fujian Province; Husband of Ye Feng
Debbie Goh	Ye Feng	Origins from Guangdong Province; A Cantonese opera performer Wife of Ma Ying Jie
Joanne Yew	Ye Qing	Younger sister of Ye Feng
Leslie Chai	Zhang Da Qing/Zhang Huai En	A dumb, Zhang Huai En's father
Aenie Wong	Zheng Pei Qi	Wife of Lin Wen Shen, Daughter of Zheng Cheng Zhu
Angie Seow	Mei Zhen	Ma Ying Jie's best friend, fall in love with Ma Ying Jie
Charlene Meng	Xiao Yan	A local village girl mixed with Chinese and Malay, fall in love with Lin Wen Sheng
Mohd Azhar	Uncle Hassan	Xiao Yan's father
Goh Wee Ping	Lin Wen Sheng	origins from Yongchun, Quanzhou, Fujian Province; A Chinese language educator
Hishiko Woo	Qi Wan Yue	Da Qing's wife, Zhang Huai En's step mom
Colin Kirton	Colonel Williams	British Army Officer
Alvin Wong	Mr George	Colonel Williams' translator
Seck Fock Yee	Li Chun Xia	Owner of a nightclub and gambling den, mistress of Ma Tian Rong
Jordan Voon Saw Peng	Ma Tian Rong	Father of Ma Ying Jie, Li Chun Xia Lover

== Production ==
- Most of the screen were shot at Penang, such as: Khoo Khongsi, Baba and Nyonya Museum, Chew's Jetty etc.
- The costumes in the drama included British Army Uniform and Japanese Army Uniform all were custom made, the opera costume worn by Debbie Goh cost RM 5000.
