= Million Loves in Me =

2018 Hong Kong-Malaysian film by Sampson Yuen

- Directed by: Sampson Yuen
- Screenplay by: John Y Tiong Wooi Lim; Jeremy Tan
- Produced by: John Y Kenny Chan
- Starring: John Y; Koon Lan Lo; Wilson Lee; Ruby Yap
- Cinematography: Tak Fung Wong
- Edited by: Cheen Hoong Loo; Chee Chong Mak; JT Billings
- Music by: David Koon; Diana Ringo
- Production company: Lustre Film Sdn Bhd
- Distributed by: California Pictures
- Release date: 24 May 2018
- Running time: 103 minutes
- Countries: Hong-Kong; Malaysia; Canada
- Languages: Cantonese; Mandarin

Million Loves in Me (Chinese: 寵我, lit. 'Dote on Me') is a 2018 drama film directed by Sampson Yuen. A Hong Kong-Malaysian-Canadian co-production, the film was inspired by a real court case in Hong Kong.

== Synopsis ==
The film is about a mother and daughter couple suffering from obsessive–compulsive disorder (OCD) whose strange behavior makes them unpopular. A journalist begins investigating them and finds that they keep more than a hundred dogs and cats in their apartment, all in cages. He then reveals his findings to the public but then begins to doubt his actions after seeing Katy, the 45-year-old daughter, arrested by the police.

== Cast and roles ==
- John Y - Katy
- Koon Lan Lo - Mrs. Fong
- Wilson Lee - James
- Ruby Yap - Cindy

== Production ==
The films script was written by John Y, a former lawyer, who represented the real Katy in 2002. He was also the producer and the lead actor of the film.

== Awards ==
The film has received the certification of The Malaysia Book of Records for "The Most Number of Awards won by an Independent Feature Film".
