= Petaling Street Warriors =

- Released poster of the movie
- Simplified Chinese: 大英雄•小男人
- Directed by: James Lee; Sampson Yuen
- Produced by: Sampson Yuen
- Starring: Mark Lee; Yeo Yann Yann; Namewee; Chris Tong; Frederick Lee; Sunny Pang; Henry Thia; Alvin Wong; Ramasundran Rengan; Rayson Tan
- Cinematography: Chan Hai Liang; Tan Teck Zee
- Production company: Juita Entertainment
- Distributed by: GSC Movies
- Release date: 1 December 2011
- Running time: 106 minutes
- Country: Malaysia
- Languages: Mandarin, Cantonese, Hokkien
- Budget: MYR3 million

Petaling Street Warriors (Chinese: 大英雄•小男人) is a 2011 film co-directed by James Lee Thim Heng and Sampson Yuen Choi-Hin through Malaysian production company, Juita Entertainment, a subsidiary of Juita Viden. Jointly presented by Juita Viden and Golden Screen Cinemas (GSC), it is the first period kungfu comedy to be produced locally in Malaysia and Singapore, with famed action choreographer from Hong Kong, Yuk-Sing Ma, who have worked on Hong Kong and China's blockbusters, such as Storm Riders 2 and A Chinese Fairy Tale.

Petaling Street Warriors premiered on 25 November 2011 at GSC Pavilion KL, Malaysia, and at 8:45 pm on 19 December 2011 at Shaw Theatres LIDO, Singapore. Since opening on 1 December, its first 4-day box office collection (MYR1.4 million). It was also the highest-grossing Chinese film in the week it was first shown.

== Plot ==
Set against the background of Petaling Street in 1908, Petaling Street Warriors tells the story of a pair of married couple, Shi Duyao and Zhung Lichun, who operate a Hokkien mee stall in Petaling Street, where they suffer from the inefficiency of the colonial government and suppression by the Chinese gangsters. While trying to impress his wife, Duyao encounters a mysterious yet strikingly beautiful kungfu expert, Xiaoju, who claims that Duyao is a descendant of the missing Jianwen Emperor of the Ming dynasty. To stop a group of Qing warriors and Japanese ninjas from robbing a treasure map that Duyao doesn't even know he has, Lichun and her cousin, Liu Kun, finally reveal their kungfu, turning Petaling Street into the ultimate battleground. Facing enemies of unthinkable powers, could Duyao unravel the mystery of his real identity and come to his wife's rescue just in time?

== Cast ==
- Mark Lee as Shi Duyao 史都耀
- Yeo Yann Yann as Zhung Lichun 钟离春
- Namewee as Liu Kun 刘坤
- Chris Tong as Xiaoju 小菊
- Frederick Lee as Ma Fuyi 马福仪
- Sunny Pang 冯推守 as Wilson Ng 吴卫生
- Alvin Wong 王骏 as Yong Kok 杨过
- Ramasundran Rengan as Rajoo
- Henry Thia as casino boss, Jay Chow 周董
- Chua Bee Seong 蔡炜祥 as Fok Yip Fei 霍叶飞
- Nick Dorian as Captain McBribe
- Chen Huen Phuei 曾宏辉 as translator-police officer
- John Cheng as the head of Hokkien gang
- Tung Yew Ngai 邓有毅 as the right-hand man of Hokkien gang
- Rosanne Lui 吕珊 as Selina
- Brandon Yuen as the head of Cantonese gang
- Wong Wai Hoong 黄伟雄 as the right-hand man of Cantonese gang
- Goh You Ping 吴友凭 as spy
- Gan Hui Yee 颜慧仪 as Mahjie
- Chee Cheong Hoe 朱宥六 as fortune teller
- Berg Lee Seng Wan as mamasan
- Ho Yuhang 何宇恒 as one of the heads of Three Knives Gang
- Kin Wah 周梓华 as one of the heads of Three Knives Gang
- Daniel Wong Kian Huat 王健发 as one of the heads of Three Knives Gang
- Rayson Tan as Sun Yat-sen
- Steve Yap 叶良财 as the Jianwen Emperor
- Chen Puie Heng 陈沛兴 as imperial guard
- Chye Yang 蔡子洋 as imperial guard
- Chong Yun Wah 张詠华 as imperial guard
- Agnes Wong 王柔霖 as imperial guard

== Production ==
The film is inspired by a controversial legend about the Jianwen Emperor of the Ming dynasty, who is rumoured to have fled to Southeast Asia when he was dethroned in the year 1402 by his uncle, Zhu Di, who later became the Yongle Emperor. Some historians have even argued that the true purpose of the Voyages of Zheng he – which began three years after the Yongle Emperor ascended the throne – was not for the sake of trade or the promotion of national pride, but to seek out the Jianwen Emperor who was suspected to be hiding in the region. During the seven voyages, Zheng He's fleets had stopped in Malacca (now a Malaysian state) for five times. Malacca served as a transit centre for replenishment of supplies for his fleets.

The story took two years of research work and preparation.

The role of Liu Kun 刘坤 was at first offered to Chapman To, but the shooting dates clashed with his schedule. As a result, Namewee was chosen to take up the role.

== Release ==
Petaling Street Warriors was initially planned to be released at the same time in Singapore and Malaysia during Chinese New Year of 2012. It was theatrically released in cinemas nationwide in Malaysia on 1 December 2011 and 29 December 2011 in Singapore.

== Reception ==
=== Box office ===
Petaling Street Warriors grossed MYR1.4 million in its first four days.

=== Critical response ===
While undergoing post-production work in Hong Kong, it has received good response from numerous Hong Kong filmmakers. Ketsarinh Lan, producer of Painted Skin and A Chinese Fairy Tale, and chairman & CEO of Golden Sun Films Distribution Limited, thinks that it has a good story and great entertainment value. After viewing the movie, Percy Fung, the person in charge of the post-production & visual effects for Hero, The Banquet, The Assembly, and Kung Fu Dunk, believes that Petaling Street Warriors has reached the production standard of Hong Kong films, and it would become a watershed in the history of Malaysian Chinese film industry. Cheung Ka Lik, post production producer of Digital Magic Hong Kong, calls this film a milestone for its genre and production quality.

According to a film review on New Straits Times, "the fighting scenes are quite impressive and are on par with their overseas counterparts. Film reviewer, Jun Kin, described the film as "reeking of raw touches of a similar themed film called Kung Fu Hustle by Stephen Chow". Online film reviewer, The Movie Blogger Fella, claims Petaling Street Warriors to be "a smart film, something its detractors clearly fail to recognise".

Malaysian writer and independent filmmaker, Amir Muhammad, claims that Petaling Street Warriors reminded him of the robust iconoclasm of Ali Baba Bujang Lapok. According to his blog review, "the movie was effortlessly political as it flipped about notions of citizenship and governance", and it "shows that mish-mash of pop genres, when handled with wit and verve, can be utterly zany and utterly serious at the same time". He explained that the ending of Petaling Street Warriors is "in the spirit of democratic optimism: it's only when we give up inherited privileges that we can truly live (together)".
