= The Superb Matchmakers =

- 媒人帮
- Genre: Romantic Comedy
- Created by: Ivie & Siew Yen
- Directed by: Kethsvin Chee
- Opening theme: 《圆圆满满》(Festive) by Casts
- Country of origin: Malaysia
- Original language: Mandarin

Production
- Producer: Lee Yvn Vonn
- Running time: 120 minutes (approx.)

Original release
- Network: ntv7
- Release: 3 February 2011

The Superb Matchmakers (媒人帮) is a telemovie that was produced by Malaysian channel, ntv7 in conjunction with 2011 Lunar New Year. ntv7 revealed this mega production on their Facebook fan page on 19 October 2010. It will air on the first day of 2011 Chinese New Year at 10:00pm slot. Behind the scene of the production of this telemovie aired on 10 January 2011, Monday at 6:00pm.

== Plot ==
"The Super Match-Makers" talks about the love stories of 6 destined match-makers since young who could only find true love upon accomplishment of an ultimate match-making mission before 30 or they would have to stay single forever.

== Cast ==
- William San 辛伟廉
- Cai Peixuan蔡佩璇
- Yeo Yann Yann 杨雁雁
- Melvin Sia 谢佳见
- Leslie Chai 蔡可立
- Miao Miao 苗苗
- Kah Chee 程珈琪
- Owen Yap 叶剑峰
- Monday 江伟翰
- Mayjune Tan 陈美君
- Hishiko Woo 吴佩其
- Frederick Lee 李洺中
- Kyo Chen 庄仲维
- Aenie Wong 王淑君

== Theme Song ==
- 《圆圆满满》(Festive) by casts, available on ntv7 2011 Chinese New Year album.

== Awards and nominations ==
Advertisement

Golden Awards 2012

- Won: Best Festival Programme
