= Time FM (TV series) =

- 时光电台
- Genre: Comedy; 80s
- Directed by: Felix Chen Bing Fen
- Starring: Adrian Tan; Melvin Sia; Yeo Yann Yann; Jane Ng
- Opening theme: "时光点播" (Shi Guang Shou Bo/Time Premiere) by Adrian Tan 陈凯旋
- Country of origin: Malaysia
- Original language: Mandarin
- No. of episodes: 13

Production
- Producers: ntv7 Dreamteam Studios
- Running time: 30 minutes (approx.)

Original release
- Network: ntv7
- Release: 28 April 2011

Time FM (时光电台) is a comedy series produced by Dreamteam Studios and ntv7 in 2011. It stars Adrian Tan, Yeo Yann Yann, Alvin Wong, Jane Ng and Melvin Sia. This 13 episode comedy series started airing on 28 April 2011 every Thursday at 11 pm.

== Synopsis ==
Time FM is a comedy series about Ke Jun Xiong who can time travel to Time FM in the 1980s. On his first day working as the office boy, he used a toilet which brings him back to 1981. Each episode starts with quote from newspaper during 1981, which is mainly the announcements of Tun Dr. Mahathir Mohamad, as the prime minister of Malaysia that year. Viewers are exposed to Mahathir's work during the 1980s, his early years as the prime minister.

== Cast ==
- Adrian Chen Kai Xuan as Ke Junxiong / Ke Huan
- Yeo Yann Yann as Lucky Jie
- Alvin Wong as Hua Tai Zhang / Jian Hua Lang
- Melvin Sia as Zhang Jia Ming / Cikgu Cheong
- Jane Ng Ming Hui as Huang Wan Jun
- Qin Wen Bing as Xia Lei Meng
- Ken Tan as You Cha Gui
- Ye Qing Fang as Lao Chi Cheong
- Zhu Jian Mei as Xiao Niu / Tea Lady
