= Golden Awards =

Golden Awards 金视奖
- Awarded for: Excellence in Malaysian Chinese television
- Country: Malaysia
- Presented by: ntv7
- First award: 2010
- Final award: 2017
- Website: www.ntv7.com.my/goldenawards

The Golden Awards (金视奖) was an award show presented by ntv7 to recognise excellence in the production and performance of Malaysian Chinese television before the channel's rebranding. The first awards show took place on 25 September 2010 at the Putrajaya International Convention Centre in Putrajaya and was hosted by Malaysian Cheryl Lee and Singaporean Bryan Wong.

There are 19 awards which will be presented at the first annual awards show. These awards are divided into three categories, namely Drama, non-Drama and Viewers' Choice.

The nominees for this awards show will be assessed by a judging panel consisting of experts within the Malaysian Chinese entertainment industry. All Malaysian Chinese television programmes qualify for nomination. Singapore-based Malaysian actors and actresses contracted to MediaCorp who have acted in co-productions are also eligible.

== List of ceremonies ==
Number	Ceremony Dates	Lifetime Achievement Award	Hosts	Venue	Broadcast/Organiser
1	25 September 2010	Dato' Lai Meng 拿督黎明	Bryan Wong 王禄江; Cheryl Lee 李欣怡	Putrajaya International Convention Centre (PICC)	Ntv7
2	22 September 2012	Yap Chin Fong 叶清方	Bryan Wong 王禄江; Cheryl Lee 李欣怡	Putrajaya International Convention Centre (PICC)	Ntv7
3	20 September 2014	Phua Chee Kian 傅志坚	Lynn Lim 林佩盈	Putrajaya International Convention Centre (PICC)	Ntv7
4	20 May 2017	Cheng Kam Cheong 郑锦昌	Cheryl Lee 李欣怡	Setia City Convention Centre Hall 1&2	Ntv7

== Awards ==
=== Drama category ===
Best Drama 最佳电视剧
Year	Drama Title (English)	Drama Title (Mandarin)
2010	The Iron Lady	女头家
2012	The Adjusters	稽查专用
2014	The Descendant	香火
2017	3:15am	凌晨3点3

Best Actor 最佳男主角
Year	Winner Name	Drama Title
2010	Melvin Sia 谢佳见	Romantic Delicacies 美食厨师男
2012	Coby Chong 庄可比	Forget Me Not 罪爱
2014	Frederick Lee 李洺中	The Descendant 香火
2017	Jordan Voon 温绍平	Daddy Dearest 阿爸

Best Actress 最佳女主角
Year	Winner Name	Drama Title
2010	Yeo Yann Yann 杨雁雁	The Iron Lady 女头家
2012	Remon Lim 林奕廷	Forget Me Not 罪爱
2014	Debbie Goh 吴天瑜	The Descendant 香火
2017	Karena Teo 张惠虹	The Missing Menu 记忆中的菜单

Best Supporting Actor 最佳男配角
Year	Winner Name	Drama Title
2010	Ernest Chong 张顺源	Exclusive
2012	Alvin Wong 王竣	Time FM 时光电台
2014	Steve Yap 叶良财	The Descendant 香火
2017	Sam Chong 张咏华	Runaway Housewives 我要放假

Best Supporting Actress 最佳女配角
Year	Winner Name	Drama Title
2010	Seck Fook Yee 释福如	The Iron Lady 女头家
2012	Yeo Yann Yann 杨雁雁	Time FM 时光电台
2014	Yeo Yann Yann 杨雁雁	Happy Family 哈比全家福
2017	Yeo Yann Yann 杨雁雁	Time FM 1970 时光电台1970

Best Newcomer 最佳新晋演员
Year	Winner Name	Drama Title
2010	Yise Loo 罗亿诗	Goodnight DJ 声空感应
2012	Crystal Lee 李馨巧	Footprints in the Sand 足印
2014	Tan Hau Yen 陈浩严	The Descendant 香火
2017	Fabian Loo 吕杨 (呂志勤)	Teen Edge 坏青春

Best Drama Theme Song 最佳电视剧主题曲
Year	Winning Song	Drama Title
2010	Fa Hua 发花 （Music and Lyrics By: You di 友弟, Zhen Ke en 郑可恩 Performed by: You Di 友弟）	The Iron Lady 女头家
2012	Light and Shadow 光影 (Music and Lyrics By: Wu Jia Hui 伍家辉, Cheryl Lee 李心怡 Performed by: Henley Hii 许亮宇)	A Time to Embrace 追影。筑梦
2014	Hui 灰 (Music and Lyrics By: Wu Jia Hui 伍家辉 Performed by: Wu Jia Hui 伍家辉	The Descendant 香火
2017	With you at home 有你在家 (Performed by: Orange Tan 陈慧恬)	Oppa? Oppa! 我的欧巴们

Best Director 最佳导演
Year	Winner Name	Drama Title
2010	—N/a	—N/a
2012	Chan Wai Cheong 陈伟昌	Goodnight DJ2 声空感应 2
2014	Jason Kok 郭福华	The Descendant 香火
2017	Kok Tzyy Haw 郭贽豪, Tan Chai Han 陈祺汉	The Precedents 法内情

Best Screenplay 最佳剧本
Year	Winner Name	Drama Title
2010	—N/a	—N/a
2012	Cheong Sheon Wai 张雄伟, Leaf Lim 林丽叶, Tee Kian Guan 郑建源	Goodnight DJ2 声空感应 2
2014	Chan Yoke Yeng 陈鈺莹	The Descendant 香火
2017	Moo Siew Kei 巫绍棋	Identity Switched 分身乏术

=== Non-drama category ===
==== Variety ====
Year	Best Reality Programme	Best Reality Programme Host	Best Variety and Entertainment Programme	Best Variety and Entertainment Programme Host
2010	Ultimate Power Group (season 1); Gary Yap and Natalie Ng	Cheryl Lee; Project Superstar 3	Double Triple Or Nothing; Dylan Liong	Owen Yap; Deal Or No Deal 2
2012	—N/a	—N/a	Love in Seoul; Belinda Chee	Cheryl Lee

==== News & Current Affairs ====
Year	Best Current Affairs Programme	Best Current Affairs Host	Best Magazine Programme	Best Magazine Programme Host	Best Festival Programme
2010	Siasat Mandarin; Case Of Migrants	Owen Yap; 8TV Mandarin news	My Home; Desmond Tey	Chan Wei Wei; Finding Angels	—N/a
2012	Editor's Time	Tiang Kah Chee ntv7 Mandarin news	Helping Hands	Cheryl Lee	The Superb Matchmakers

=== Viewers’ choice category ===
Year	Most Popular Actor	Most Popular Actress	Most Popular Drama	Most Popular TV Host / Presenter	Most Popular Newscaster
2010	Melvin Sia	Debbie Goh	The Iron Lady	Gary Yap	—N/a
2012	Leslie Chai	Debbie Goh	I, My Brother	Natalie Ng	Tan Ley Teng

== See also ==
- List of Asian television awards
- 2010 Golden Awards
