= Exclusive (TV series) =

- 独家追辑
- Genre: Journalism
- Starring: Berg Lee
- Country of origin: Malaysia
- Original language: Chinese
- No. of episodes: 20

Production
- Running time: 60 minutes (approx.)

Original release
- Network: ntv7
- Release: 17 June – 22 July 2008

Related
- Age of Glory; Her Many Faces

Exclusive (Chinese: 独家追辑) is a 2008 Malaysian Chinese-language drama television series. It was co-produced by Double Vision and ntv7, and was broadcast every Monday to Thursday, at 9:45 pm on Malaysia's ntv7 channel.

== Cast ==
- Berg Lee
- Yise Loo
- Alvin Wong
- Mayjune Tan
- Monday Kang
