= Forget Me Not (TV series) =

- 罪爱
- Directed by: Sam Au; David Lau
- Country of origin: Malaysia
- Original language: Chinese
- No. of episodes: 30

Production
- Producer: Double Vision Sdn Bhd
- Running time: 60 minutes (approx.)

Original release
- Network: ntv7
- Release: 2 August 2011

Forget Me Not 《罪爱》 is a Malaysian television series co-produced by Double Vision and ntv7. It is aired every Monday to Thursday, at 10:00pm on Malaysia's ntv7. This drama started airing on 2 August 2011 on the Malaysian channel.

This drama may be the second production by MediaCorp Studios Malaysia Sdn Bhd.

== Cast ==
=== Li Family ===
Cast	Role	Description
Jordan Voon	Li Xin De	
Remon Lim 林弈廷	Xue Ming	Yang Wei Yi, Yang Wei Hao and Li Ruo Tong's mother
Angela Chan	Yong En	Main Villain
Susan Leong	Xin De's mother	
Leslie Chai 蔡珂立	Kent Li Guo Xiu	Main Villain Li Xin De and Yong En's son Li Ruo Tong's half-brother
Jojo Goh 吴俐璇	Annie Li Ruo Tong	Li Xin De and Xue Ming's daughter Li Guo Xiu, Yang Wei Yi, Yang Wei Hao's half-sister

=== Yang Family ===
Cast	Role	Description
William San 辛伟廉	Yang Wei Yi	
Coby Chong 庄可比	Yang Wei Hao	
Seck Fook Yee	Chan Mei Yi	

=== Lin Family ===
Cast	Role	Description
Wayne Chua 蔡佩璇	Lin Li Wen	
Adrian Tan 陈凯旋	Lin Jin Bao	

== Awards and nominations ==
Golden Awards 2012

- Nominated: Best Drama
- Nominated: Most Popular Drama
- Won: Best Actress (Remon Lim)
- Won: Best Actor (Coby Chong)
- Nominated: Best Actor (Willian San)
- Nominated: Best Drama Theme Song
