= Age of Glory =

2008 Chinese TV series

- 情牽南苑爱
- Genre: Period Drama
- Directed by: James Lee
- Starring: Debbie Goh; Danielle Dai; Aenie Wong
- Opening theme: Yuan Que 圆缺 by Cheryl Lee
- Ending theme: Luo Mu 落幕 oleh Cheryl Lee, Debbie Goh, Danielle Dai and Aenie Wong
- Country of origin: Malaysia
- Original language: Chinese
- No. of episodes: 42

Production
- Running time: 60 minutes (approx.)

Original release
- Network: ntv7
- Release: 3 April – 16 June 2008

Related
- Age Of Glory 2

Age of Glory (simplified Chinese: 情牵南苑; traditional Chinese: 情牽南苑; pinyin: qíng qiān nán yuàn) is a Chinese drama series which co-produce by Double Vision and ntv7. It was telecast on every Monday to Thursday, at 9.45 pm on Malaysia's ntv7 channel. This period drama was set in the early years of the independence of Malaysia. The cast in this series are renowned artists such as Debbie Goh who was based on TVB in Hong Kong, together with ntv7's reporters, Danielle Dai and Aenie Wong. Also, guest appearance by Janet Khoo. This is the first time director James Lee leads Chinese drama series and a period drama genre. It was the highest rated drama series in 2008.

== Synopsis ==
Age of Glory tells the life and love of three women in the 1960s: a dancer, a singer and a homemaker, based park break BB Park (now Sungei Wang Plaza).

== Casts and characters ==
=== Main cast ===
- Debbie Goh portrays Lin Yu Lan (Rose), Born in a small town in Selangor, Lin Yu Lan has always longed for freedom from her feudalistic father. She runs away to Kuala Lumpur with her lover and her life worsens when her lover gambles his way into major debts. Yu Lan then becomes a dance hostess, still believing that she will find her true love one day.
- Aenie Wong portrays Chen Mei, is Rose’s servant. She despises Rose’s occupation as a dance hostess at first but then becomes good friends with her after getting to know her better. She vows to be chaste for life but meets Wang Cai with whom she falls hopelessly in love. However, Wang Cai later leaves her. Chen Mei gives birth to his child and brings up the child on her own.
- Danielle Dai portrays Huang Shu Juan, Shu Juan arrives in Kuala Lumpur from a fishing village to participate in a singing contest. Shu Juan meets Rose and Chen Mei and they become good friends. With Rose’s help, Shu Juan becomes a singer at the night club and quickly becomes the talk of the town. However she rejects a record deal to pursue the love of her life.

=== Other casts ===
| Cast | Role | Description |
|---|---|---|
| Frederick Lee | He Fu Gui (何富贵) | |
| Steve Yap | Zhang Guan Sheng (张冠生) | |
| Leslie Chai | He Bao Sheng (何宝胜) | |
| Melvin Sia | Xie Wang Cai (谢旺才) | Chen Mei's ex-boyfriend |

== Production ==
The production of this series cost over RM3 million for the 42 episodes. Much emphasis is given on the aspects of 1960s nostalgia completion, including building a replica of BB Park in Port Dickson in accordance with the original plan, with elements of a unique era in fashion and these include clothes and languages spoken in the community during that period.

== Viewership ratings ==
In the series premiere of Age of Glory, it rated about 800 thousand viewers, hence, creating a new record in Malaysian local Chinese drama series with high ratings. In addition to its high viewership ratings in Malaysia among Chinese viewers, this drama also attracted the attentions of other Chinese broadcasters, including TVB in Hong Kong, which Debbie Goh was based on.

== Awards and nominations ==
Golden Awards

- Nominated: Best Drama
- Nominated: Most Popular Drama
- Nominated: Best Actress (Debbie Goh)
- Won: Most Popular Actress (Debbie Goh)
- Nominated: Best Drama Theme Song
