= Vedigundu Pasangge =

- Official Theaterical Poster
- Directed by: Dr. Vimala Perumal
- Written by: Denes Kumar; Dr. Vimala Perumal
- Produced by: Denes Kumar
- Starring: Denes Kumar; Sangeeta Krishnasamy; David Antonny; Thangamani Velayudan
- Cinematography: P. Chidambaram
- Edited by: Anand Geraldin Cardoza
- Music by: Vivek–Mervin
- Production company: Veedu Production
- Distributed by: Veedu Production
- Release date: 26 July 2018
- Running time: 2h 18mins
- Country: Malaysia
- Language: Tamil
- Budget: RM 1,500,000
- Box office: RM 1,330,219

Vedigundu Pasangge is a 2018 Malaysian Tamil language crime comedy film. It was the final instalment of Pasangge trilogy film series after Vilayaatu Pasange (2011), and Vetti Pasanga (2014). Vimala Perumal directed the movie with an ensemble cast including Denes Kumar, Sangeeta Krishnasamy, David Anthony, and Thangamani Velayuda. Music and background music were scored by composer duo Vivek–Mervin.

The film had a limited release on 26 July 2018, in Malaysia, Singapore, Sri Lanka, Tamil Nadu and United Kingdom. Vedigundu Pasangge became the first Malaysian Tamil language film to pass the RM million mark, and went on to surpass Maindhan (2014) to emerge as the highest grossing Tamil Malaysian film of all time.

The film premiered in Disney+ Hotstar on 1 June 2021.

== Synopsis ==
The film revolves around a village boy named Theva. He ends up in a twisted situation and realises that everything surrounding him is a mystery. Things take a sour turn for Theva, thanks to his unawareness of the true colours of Boss. Boss uses him as bait, which causes trouble for him. Theva learns one of life's lessons – once bitten, twice shy.

== Cast ==
- Denes Kumar as Theva
- Sangeeta Krishnasamy as Vithya
- Thangamani Velayudan as Asirvatham
- David Anthony as Mama (Uncle)
- Alvin Martin as Jing Cha
- Magendran Raman as Boss
- Kuben Mahadevan As Cocojelly
- Krishnan Bahador as Kesha
- Pashini as Nila
- Saran Kumar as Saran
- Seelan Manoharan as Inspector Ram
- Prakash Krishna as Corporal Rajan
- Revathy Mariappan as Corporal Sheila

== Soundtrack ==
The soundtrack was composed by Vivek-Mervin.

Vedigundu Pasangge

Soundtrack album by Vivek-Mervin
- Released: 15 May 2018
- Genre: Tamil
- Language: Tamil
- Label: Veedu Music
- Director: Dr. Vimala Perumal
- Producer: Denes Kumar

Vivek-Mervin chronology
Mohini (2018)	Vedigundu Pasangge (2018)	Thumbaa (2019)

No.	Title	Lyrics	Singer(s)	Length
1.	"Vaada Vilaiyaadu"	Anthony Daasan, Denes Kumar, Balan Kashmir	Anthony Daasan, Balan Kashmir	4:09
2.	"#Love Mood"	Prakash Francis	Mervin Solomon, Datin Sri Shaila Nair	3:54
3.	"Vizhiye Kalangathey"	Ko Sesha	Sathyaprakash Dharmar, Sakthisree Gopalan	4:25
4.	"Vedigundu Pasangge Theme Song"	Ku Kartik, Denes Kumar, ADK	Teejay Arunasalam, Dinesh Kanagaratnam	2:56

== Box office ==
Vedigundu Pasangge created history by becoming the first and highest-grossing Tamil language movie in Malaysia after crossing RM 1.3 million. Producer Denes Kumar said the earnings were achieved two weeks after the movie opened at 55 cinemas nationwide, as well as five cinemas in the United Kingdom on 26 July. The film earned £222 on the first day in United Kingdom. It was the highest opening collection for a movie from Malaysia in the United Kingdom box office.

== Accolades ==
A special jury awarded in 30th Malaysia Film Festival for Vedigundu Pasangge for becoming the first Malaysian Tamil language film to collect more than RM1 million and gave Malaysian filmmakers a real reason to celebrate. The film has also won numerous awards in national and international film festivals with its own success. Among them are Malaysia Book of Records for Collection of Highest Indian Movie Theaters in Malaysia, Cinema Worldfest Awards (Musical Comedy), Calcutta International Cult Film Festival (Best Female Film Director) and also the South Film & Arts Academy Festival (Best Editor, Best Art Arrangement, Best Sound Arrangement), Accolade Global Film Competition and the Barcelona Planet Film Festival (Best Screenplay).

Award	Category	Recipient(s) and nominee(s)	Result
30th Malaysia Film Festival	Special Jury Award	Vedigundu Pasangge	Won
30th Malaysia Film Festival	Best Film	Vedigundu Pasangge	Nominated
30th Malaysia Film Festival	Best Director	Dr. Vimala Perumal	Nominated
30th Malaysia Film Festival	Best Screenplay	Dr. Vimala Perumal	Nominated
30th Malaysia Film Festival	Best Story	Dr. Vimala Perumal & Denes Kumar	Nominated
30th Malaysia Film Festival	Best Costume Design	Yogash Yogg	Nominated
30th Malaysia Film Festival	Best VFX	Ma Chiau Ran	Nominated
2018 Kuala Lumpur Film Critics Award	Best Actress	Sangeeta Krishnasamy	Nominated
Norway Tamil Film Festival Awards 2019	Best Tamil Film (Midnight Sun)	Dr. Vimala Perumal	Won
Norway Tamil Film Festival Awards 2019	Best Actor Female Tamil – Diaspora	Sangeeta Krishnasamy	Won
Cinefest Malaysia Awards 2019	Box Office of the Year 2018 (Special Jury Award)	Veedu Production	Won
Cinefest Malaysia Awards 2019	Best Movie	Veedu Production	Won
Cinefest Malaysia Awards 2019	Best Actor	Denes Kumar	Won
Cinefest Malaysia Awards 2019	Best Director	Dr. Vimala Perumal	Won
Cinefest Malaysia Awards 2019	Best International Music Director	Vivek-Mervin	Won
Cinefest Malaysia Awards 2019	Best International Cinematography	Chidambaram	Won
Cinefest Malaysia Awards 2019	Best International Editor	Anand Geraldin	Won
Cinefest Malaysia Awards 2019	Best Song	Vizhiye Kalangathey	Won
Cinefest Malaysia Awards 2019	Best Music Video	#Love Mood	Won
Cinefest Malaysia Awards 2019	Best Playback Singer Female	Datin Sri Shaila V.	Won
Barcelona Planet Film Festival	Best Screenplay	Dr. Vimala Perumal	Won
Barcelona Planet Film Festival	Best Female Film Maker	Dr. Vimala Perumal	Nominated
