= Saw Teong Hin =

Malaysian film director

- 蘇倧興
- Born: 24 August 1962 (age 64); Penang, Federation of Malaya (now Malaysia)
- Occupation: Film director
- Years active: 2004–present

Saw Teong Hin (Chinese: 蘇倧興; Pe̍h-ōe-jī: So͘ Tiong-hèng) is a Malaysian film director, best known for directing the Malay language epic fantasy film Puteri Gunung Ledang and You Mean the World to Me, the first Malaysian film filmed entirely in Hokkien.

== Early life and education ==
Saw was born in George Town, Penang in the year of 1962 to Quah Cheng Sooi and Saw Seng Chuan; Both Hokkien people. His paternal grandfather was adopted, likely from his great-grandfather who had conducted businesses in the northern states.

He received a scholarship to study double physics and mathematics at the National University of Singapore, though he never graduated. It was also during this period that he decided to switch interests. Saw felt an immense guilt over his eventual failure, even though his parents would still accept the outcome, thus he went straight to Kuala Lumpur to live on his own after finishing his stint at the university. He took interest in the field of advertising, calling as many agencies as he could asking for any job vacancies available. His calls went unnoticed except for one lady from Ogilvy and Mather who referred him to Joe Hasham, who offered Saw a job in his company as production assistant and later advertisement film director.

== Career ==
=== Other projects ===
Saw was selected to become the creative director for both opening and closing ceremonies of the 2017 Southeast Asian Games.

== Filmography ==
=== Film ===
Year	Title	Credited as			Notes
Year	Title	Director	Writer	Producer	Notes
2004	Puteri Gunung Ledang	Yes	Yes	No	
2008	Apa Kata Hati?	Yes	No	No	
2012	Hoore! Hoore!	Yes	Yes	Yes	
2015	Jejak Warrior	Yes	No	No	
2017	You Mean the World to Me	Yes	Yes	Yes	In hokkien penang language
2018	Rise: Ini Kalilah	Yes	Yes	Yes	Co-directed with Nik Amir Mustapha and Prem Nath
2025	Laknat	Yes	No	Yes	

== Awards ==
Year	Award	Category	Work	Result
2005	18th Malaysia Film Festival	Best Director	Puteri Gunung Ledang	Won
2005	18th Malaysia Film Festival	Best Screenplay	Puteri Gunung Ledang	Won
2017	29th Malaysia Film Festival	Best Screenplay	You Mean The World To Me	Won
