= The Iron Lady (TV series) =

- 女头家
- Starring: Yeo Yann Yann; Aenie Wong
- Music by: 单
- Country of origin: Malaysia
- Original languages: Mandarin; Hokkien; Cantonese
- No. of episodes: 35

Production
- Running time: approx. 45 minutes

Original release
- Network: ntv7
- Release: 17 March – 17 May 2009

Related
- Lion.Hearts; Welcome Home, My Love

The Iron Lady is another series produced by ntv7 and Double Vision. The series began its run on 17 March 2009 at 10:00 pm on ntv7.

== Synopsis ==
In earlier times, girls born to traditional Chinese families were deprived of privileges and opportunities reserved for males. Most of them accepted their fate dutifully and submissively.

One woman dares to defy the hand she was dealt. Opportunist and ambitious, she desires power to control her own destiny above all else.

=== The Gao Family ===
| Cast | Role | Description |
|---|---|---|
| Jacky Kam | Fu Shao Zhang | Shi Qin's husband Man Hua, Man Ling, Tian Yao and Lin Xi father's |
| Yeo Yann Yann | Gao Shi Qin | Eldest child to the firstborn of Gao family |
| Mandy Chen | Gao Man Hua | Eldest child in family Man Ling's elder sister Tian Yao's half-sister |
| Angie Seow | Gao Man Ling | Second child in family Man Hua's younger sister Tian Yao's half-sister Zhen Ming's wife |
| Jeffery Cheng | Gao Tian Yao | Youngest child of Yu Zhi and Shao Zhang; Lin Xi's twin brother |
| Aenie Wong | Lin Xi | Yu Zhi and Shao Zhang's daughter Tian Yao's twin sister Zhen Ming's ex-fiancée |

=== Other casts ===
| Cast | Role | Description |
|---|---|---|
| Frederick Lee | Ou Zhen Ming | Tian Yao's best friend Lin Xi's ex-fiancée Man Ling's husband |
| Hishiko Woo | Yu Zhi | Age 20s Tian Yao, Lin Xi and Lin Bing's mother |
| Seck Fok Yee | Yu Zhi | Age 50s Same character portrayed by Hishiko |
| Chen Huen Phuei | Lin Bing | Yu Zhi's daughter, Lin Xi's sister |

== Accolades ==
| Year | Organisation | Category | Nominee | Result | Ref |
|---|---|---|---|---|---|
| 2010 | Golden Awards | Best Drama | —N/a | Won | |
| 2010 | Golden Awards | Most Popular Drama | —N/a | Won | |
| 2010 | Golden Awards | Best Actress | Yeo Yann Yann | Won | |
| 2010 | Golden Awards | Most Popular Actress | Yeo Yann Yann | Nominated | |
| 2010 | Golden Awards | Best Supporting Actress | Sck Fook Yee | Won | |
| 2010 | Golden Awards | Best Drama Theme Song | "发花" | Won | |
