= 9th Malaysia International Film Festival =

2025 edition of Malaysian film festival

2026 Malaysia International Film Festival
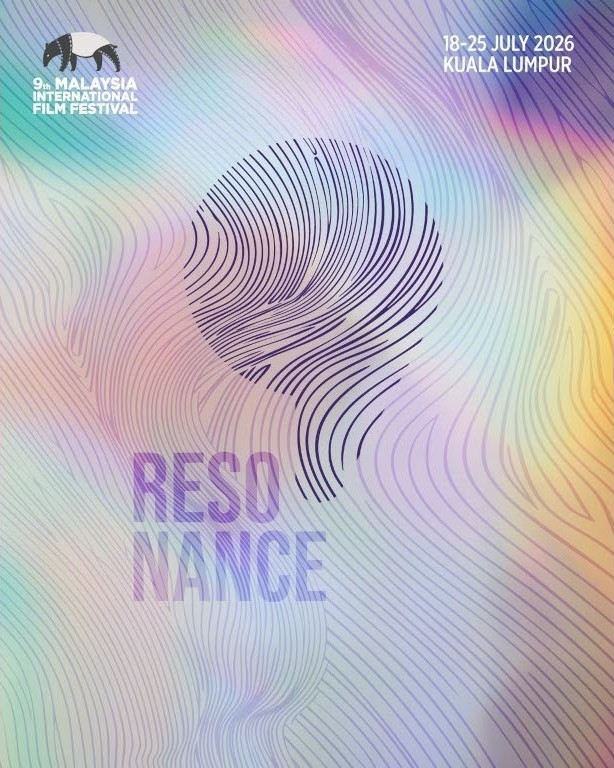
- Festival Poster
- Opening film: BAGA : Tomorrow Belongs To No One
- Closing film: Yellow Letters
- Location: Kuala Lumpur
- Founded: 2017
- Awards: Malaysia Golden Global Awards
- Hosted by: Organized by Jazzy Group (M) Sdn Bhd
- No. of films: 65 films (in competition)
- Festival date: 18 - 25 July 2026; 25 July 2026 (MGGA)
- Website: MIFFest 2026

MIFFest
- 2027 2025

Returning to Kuala Lumpur from 18–25 July 2026, the 9th Malaysia International Film Festival (MIFFest) hosted a celebration of international cinema. The ambassador lineup that year features Bront Palarae, Daiyan Trisha, Jack Tan, and Zizan Razak, who embody the festival's spirit of creativity and cultural exchange. The festival will kick off with BAGA: Tomorrow Belongs To No One and draw to a close with Yellow Letters, bringing audiences on a cinematic journey that reflects the year's theme, "Resonance."

== Official Juries ==
=== Final Selection Jury ===
Jury Name(s)	Jury Member	Jury President
Anurag Kashyap	—N/a	✓
Ananda Everingham	✓	—N/a
Man Lin-Chung	✓	—N/a
Midi Z	✓	—N/a
Sharifah Amani	✓	—N/a

Jury Name(s)	Preliminary Selection	Semi-Final Selection
Ameerul Affiq	check	—N/a
A. Wahab Hamzah	check	—N/a
Andrew Boong	check	—N/a
Farid Rahman	check	—N/a
Hidayah Hisham	check	—N/a
Ho Chee Jen	check	—N/a
Isyraqi Yahya	check	—N/a
Lim Mei Fen	check	—N/a
Pael Khugan	check	—N/a
Qistina Yusof	check	—N/a
Sarah Lois Dorai	check	—N/a
Vernon Adrian Emuang	check	—N/a
Weissa G.	check	—N/a
Yussuf Mohd Yunus	check	—N/a
Zuli Ismail	check	—N/a
A Samad Hassan	—N/a	check
Ally Sunhee HAN	—N/a	check
Chia-Hui Wang	—N/a	check
Jasmine Suraya	—N/a	check
Noor Azam Shairi	—N/a	check
Patrick Mao Huang	—N/a	check
Prof. Eva Kit Wah Wan	—N/a	check
Stefano Centini	—N/a	check

== Official Selection ==
=== Opening Film ===
English title	Original title	Director(s)	Production country
BAGA : Tomorrow Belongs To No One		Ariff Zulkarnain	Malaysia

=== Closing Film ===
English title	Original title	Director(s)	Production country
Yellow Letters	Gelbe Briefe	Ilker Çatak	Germany, France, Turkey

=== A Lister ===
English title	Original title	Director(s)	Production country
SHAM	でっちあげ	Takashi Miike	Japan
Sirât		Oliver Laxe	Spain, France
Two Seasons, Two Strangers	旅と日々	Sho Miyake	Japan

=== Neon ===
English title	Original title	Director(s)	Production country
A Dance With Rainbows	恨女的逆襲	Lee Yi-shan	Taiwan
AnyMart	チルド	Yusuke Iwasak	Japan
Calle Málaga		Maryam Touzani	Morocco, France, Spain, Germany, Belgium
June	六月	Wang Yang	Hong Kong, China

=== Manifesto ===
English title	Original title	Director(s)	Production country
Anti-Heroes of the Bahian Underground	Anti-Heróis do Udigrudi Baiano	Henrique Dantas	Brazil
A Shanghai Daughter	上海女儿	Agnis Shen Zhongmin	China

=== Malaysian Dispatch ===
English title	Original title	Director(s)
Finding Ramlee		Megat Sharizal
HER SECOND ACT		Joey Lee
Polong		Zulkarnain Azhar

=== ASEAN on screen ===
English title	Original title	Director(s)	Production country
Bury Us in a Lone Desert	Nấm Mồ Lý Tưởng	Nguyễn Lê Hoàng Phúc	Vietnam
Dopamine	Dopamin	Teddy Soeriaatmadja	Indonesia
Phra Ruang: Rise of the Empire	พระร่วง..มหาศึกสุโขทัย	Chartchai Ketnust	Thailand
Republic of Pipolipinas	Republika ng Pipolipinas	Renei Dimla	Philippines
Tears in Kuala Lumpur		Ridhwan Saidi	Malaysia
Sandbox		James Thoo	Singapore

=== Hong Kong Cinema in Flux ===
English title	Original title	Director(s)
Bird of Paradise	媽樣年華	Wu Chui-yi
Ciao UFO	再見UFO	Patrick Leung
Dog Day Evening	一個部門的誕生	Mak Tin-shu
The Dating Menu	廚師發辦	Frankie Wang-Kit Chung, Amos Why
Unidentified Murder	UFO離奇命案	Kwok Ka-hei, Jack Lee

=== Russian Film Week ===
Marking a new partnership with the Ministry of Culture of the Russian Federation and ROSKINO, the curated five-film showcase invites Malaysian audiences to discover the diversity of Russian filmmaking.

English title	Original title	Director(s)
Andrey Rublev	Андрей Рублёв	Andrei Tarkovsky
Family Happiness	Семейное счастье	Stasia Tolstoy
The Lefty	Левша	Vladimir Besedin
Sidney Lumet's Birthday	День рождения Сидни Люмета	Raul Geydarov
The Cranes Are Flying	Летят журавли	Mikhail Kalatozov

=== New Rhythms of Indian Cinema ===
English title	Original title	Director(s)
Black Friday	ब्लैक फ्राइडे	Anurag Kashyap
MAYILAA	மயிலா	Semmalar Annam
Parikrama: The Journey	Parikrama	Goutam Ghose
Shape of Momo	छोरा जस्तै	Tribeny Rai
Sholay	शोले	Ramesh Sippy

=== Korean Cinema: A Culture in Motion ===
English title	Original title	Director(s)
Bluefish	청어	Lee Sang-hoon
Mr. Kim Goes to the Cinema	미스터김, 영화관에 가다	Kim Dong-ho

=== Raintown Film Festival Short Film Showcase ===
Nine short films from the Top 10 Competition of the Raintown Film Festival 2025 during the Open Air Cinema showcase celebrates the creativity and passion of newer generations of filmmakers. As part of MIFFest's commitment to nurturing emerging local talent, the outdoor screening offers audiences a chance to discover the voices and perspectives shaping the future of Malaysian cinema.

English title	Original title	Director(s)
CHILI, GARLIC AND ONION	辣椒 蒜头 洋葱	Kent Tan
Drip by Drip	滴答滴答	Liang Xuan
Hadiah Dari Hujan		Aei Raa
Hujan Di Tengah Hari		Faris Nabil
Kuala Lain		Adam Taufiq Suharto
Madeleine	潮湿衣服	Goh Zi Wei
Thulir		Kuhanraj Rajasingam
Where the Fish Looked Up	一只鱼的天空	Yeo Jun Yu

=== Competition ===
English title	Original title	Director(s)	Production country
Ah Girl		Ang Geck Geck	Singapore
Aisha Can't Fly Away		Morad Mostafa	Egypt
Becoming Human	ជាតិជាមនុស្សា	Polen Ly	Cambodia
Broken Voices	Sbormistr	Ondřej Provazník	Czechia
Girl	女孩	Shu Qi	Taiwan
Lucky Lu	幸福之路	Lloyd Lee Choi	United States, Canada
Riverstone	රිවස්ටන්	Lalith Rathnayake	Sri Lanka
Silent Rebellion	À bras-le-corps	Marie-Elsa Sgualdo	Switzerland, Belgium, France
The Red Hangar	Hangar rojo	Juan Pablo Sallato	Chile, Argentina, Italy
The Waves Will Carry Us	人生海海	Kek Huat Lau	Malaysia, Taiwan

=== Actor in Focus: Wu Jing ===
English title	Original title	Director(s)	Production country
Blades of the Guardians: Wind Rises in the Desert	鏢人：風起大漠	Yuen Woo-Ping	China

=== Master at Work: LEE Chang-dong ===
English title	Original title	Director(s)	Production country
Oasis	오아시스	Lee Chang-dong	South Korea
Peppermint Candy	박하사탕	Lee Chang-dong	South Korea

== MGGA 2026 ==
9th Malaysia Golden Global Awards
- Date: July 25, 2026
- Site: Mega Star Arena, Sungei Wang Plaza
- Hosted by: Red Carpet; Ding, Georgory Ramando; Main Ceremony; Ding, Dr. Shaun Stephen, Chrystina Ng
- Organized by: Jazzy Group of Companies

Television coverage
- Network: Delayed Broadcast; Viu TV (12 September 2026); LIVE Broadcast; Youtube (Red Carpet); Facebook (Both); RTM TV 2 (Main Ceremony); Unifi TV (Main Ceremony)
- Duration: 120 Minutes
- Ratings: 2.1k (Facebook Live)

The 9th Malaysia Golden Global Awards (MGGA) was held in conjunction with the 9th Malaysia International Film Festival (MIFFest), taking place from 18 to 25 July 2026 in Kuala Lumpur. As the festival's prestigious closing event, the awards ceremony celebrates outstanding achievements in both international and Malaysian cinema, honouring excellence across major categories including Best Film, Best Director, Best Actor, Best Actress, and other artistic and technical accomplishments in filmmaking.

=== Special awards ===
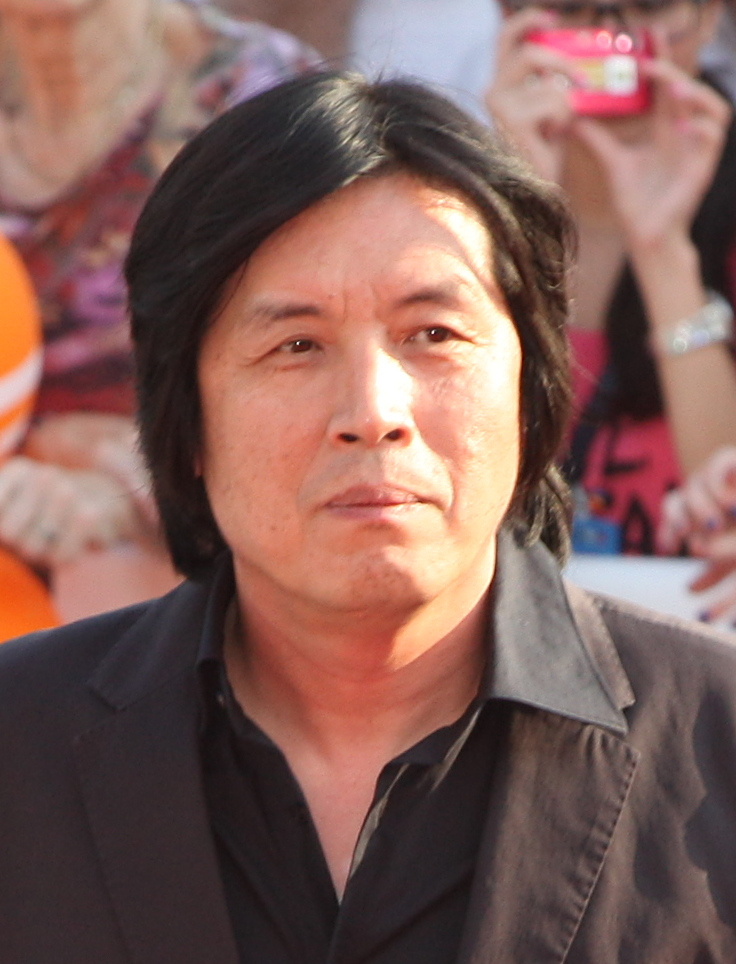
Lee Chang-dong, Lifetime Achievement Award Recipient

Hallyu
Award for Excellence Achievement in Film 卓越电影成就奖	Wu Jing (吴京)
Lifetime Achievement Award 终身成就奖	Lee Chang-dong (이창동)

=== Winners & Nominees ===
Winners announced on July 25, 2026.

Winners are listed first and highlighted in boldface.

**Best Film** **Lucky Lu**: Ah Girl; Aisha Can't Fly Away; Becoming Human; Broken Voices; Girl; Riverstone; Silent Rebellion; The Red Hangar; The Waves Will Carry Us	**Best Director** **Morad Mostafa - Aisha Can't Fly Away**: Ang Geck Geck Priscilla - Ah Girl; Lalith Rathnayake - Riverstone; Marie-Elsa Sgualdo - Silent Rebellion; Juan Pablo Sallato - The Red Hangar
**Best Actor** **Mahendra Perera - Riverstone**: Juraj Loj - Broken Voices; Chang Chen - Lucky Lu; Randika Gunathilaka - Riverstone; Nicolás Zárate - The Red Hangar	**Best Actress** **Lila Gueneau - Silent Rebellion TIE**; **Ong Xuan Jing - Ah Girl TIE**: Buliana Simon - Aisha Can't Fly Away; Kateřina Falbrová- Broken Voices; 9m88 Tang Yuqi - Girl
**Best Supporting Actor** **Priyantha Sirikumara - Riverstone**: James Seah - Ah Girl; Emad Ghoniem - Aisha Can't Fly Away; Grégoire Colin - Silent Rebellion; Fabian Loo - The Waves Will Carry Us	**Best Supporting Actress** **Audrey Lin - Girl**: Carrie Wong - Ah Girl; Maya Kintera - Broken Voices; Aurélia Petit - Silent Rebellion; Catalina Stuardo - The Red Hangar
**Best Screenplay** **Luis Emilio Guzmán - The Red Hangar**: Ang Geck Geck - Ah Girl; Polen Ly - Becoming Human; Lalith Rathnayake, Nilantha Perera - Riverstone; Morad Mostafa, Sawsan Youssef, Mohamed Abdelader - Aisha Can't Fly Away	**Best Cinematography** **Diego Pequeño - The Red Hangar**: Mostafa El Kashef - Aisha Can't Fly Away; Yu Jing-Pin - Girl; Norm Li - Lucky Lu; Benoît Dervaux - Silent Rebellion
**Audience Choice Award**
**Sirât - Oliver Laxe**
**New Hope Award**
**Ang Geck Geck Priscilla - Ah Girl**

== Presenters & Performers ==
The following individuals, listed in order of appearance, presented awards or performed musical numbers:

Presenters
Name(s)	Role
Colin	Served as announcer for the 9th Golden Global Awards
Bront Palarae; Daiyan Trisha; Jack Tan 陈泽耀	Gave an opening monologue for the 9th Golden Global Awards
Goutam Ghose	Presented New Hope Award
Man Lin-Chung 文念中	Presented Best Cinematography
Ananda Everingham	Presented Best Screenplay
Ji Seung Hyun 지승현; Cecilia Choi 蔡思韵	Presented Best Supporting Actress
Ding 丁丁; Dr. Shaun Stephen	Introduced Presenter Jack Tan 陈泽耀 and Daiyan Trisha
Jack Tan 陈泽耀; Daiyan Trisha	Presented Best Supporting Actor
Steve Yap 叶良财; Lin Min Chen 林明禎	Presented Audience Choice Award
Ding 丁丁; Dr. Shaun Stephen	Introduced Presenter Sinjie Lee 李心洁
Sinjie Lee 李心洁	Presented Excellence Achievement Award to Wu Jing 吴京
Sharifah Amani	Presented Best Actress
Maggie Cheung 張可頤; Catherine Chau 周家怡	Presented Best Actor
Joanne Goh (Miffest President); Kim Dong Ho (Miffest Chair)	Presented Lifetime Achievement Award to Lee Chang-Dong 이창동
Midi Z 趙德胤	Presented Best Director
Anurag Kashyap	Presented Best Film

Performers
Name(s)	Role
KAYDA	Performed Only U by Cuurley, Kayda from Ejen Ali The Movie
KAYDA	Performed Boneka by Kayda
Geraldine Yan 顏慧萍	Performed Skyfall by Adele Adkins from the film Skyfall
