= List of Afghan Asia Pacific Screen Award winners and nominees =

This is a list of Afghan Asia Pacific Screen Awards winners and nominees. This list details the performances of Afghan actors, actresses, and films that have either been submitted or nominated for, or have won, an Asia Pacific Screen Award.

== Awards and nominations ==
Year (Ceremony)	Award	Recipient	Result	Note	Ref.
2015 (9th)	Best Youth Feature Film	Mina Walking	Nominated	Afghan-Canadian co-production	
2016 (10th)	Best Youth Feature Film	Wolf and Sheep	Nominated	Afghan-French-Swedish-Danish co-production	
2019 (13th)	Cultural Diversity Award (UNESCO)	Rona, Azim's Mother	Won	Iranian-Afghan co-production	
2019 (13th)	Best Youth Feature Film	The Orphanage	Nominated	Afghan-Danish-German-French-Luxembourgish-Qatari co-production	
2021 (14th)	Best Youth Feature Film	When Pomegranates Howl	Nominated	Afghan-Australian-Iranian-Dutch co-production	
2024 (17th)	Best Documentary Film	Kamay	Nominated	Afghan-Belgian-French-German co-production	

- Nominations – 6
- Wins – 1

== See also ==
- List of Afghan submissions for the Academy Award for Best International Feature Film
