= Asia Pacific Screen Award for Best Youth Film =

The Asia Pacific Screen Award for Best Youth Film, formerly known as Asia Pacific Screen Award for Best Youth Feature Film, are awarded annually as part of the Asia Pacific Screen Awards.

The winners and nominees of this award include:

== 2000s ==
Year	Winner and nominees	English title	Original title
2007	(Indonesia) Ari Sihasale	Denias, Singing on the Cloud	Denias, Senandung di atas awan
2007	(Philippines) Menardo Jimenez, Socorro Fernandez	The Bicycle	Gulong
2007	(Iran) Hassan Agha-Karimi	The Locksmith	Ghofl-saz
2007	(Philippines) Antonio Gloria	Mother Nanny	Inang yaya
2007	(Malaysia) Puad Onah	Mukhsin	
2008	(Australia) Tristram Miall	The Black Balloon	
2008	Kranti Kanade, Children's Film Society of India	Mahek	
2008	(Philippines) Auraeus Solito	Philippine Science	Pisay
2008	(Sri Lanka) Somaratne Dissanayake, Renuka Balasooriya	King Siri	Siri Raja Siri
2009	(South Korea) (France) Lee Chang-dong, Lauren Lavole, Lee Joon-dong	A Brand New Life	
2009	(Turkey) Atalay Tasdiken	Mommo the Bogeyman	Mommo-Kizkardesim
2009	(Indonesia) Nan Achnas, Nurman Hakim, Adiyanto Sumarjono	Pesantren: 3 Wishes 3 Loves	3 Doa 3 Cinta
2009	(Philippines) (Germany) Fiona Copland	The Strength of Water	
2009	(India) Shripal Morakhia, Mubina Rattonsey,	Tahaan: A Boy with a Grenade	

== 2010s ==
Year	Winner and nominees	English title	Original title
2010	(Iran) Mohammad-Ali Najafi, Shafi Agha Mohammadian	Digari	
2010	(New Zealand) Ainsley Gardiner, Cliff Curtis, Emanuel Michael	Boy	
2010	(India) Sanjay Singh, Anurag Kashyap, Ronnie Screwvala	Udaan	
2010	(Hong Kong) (China) Mabel Cheung	Echoes of the Rainbow	
2010	(Australia) Robyn Kershaw, Graeme Isaac	Bran Nue Dae	
2011	(Azerbaijan) Khamis Muradov, Ilgar Najaf	Buta	
2011	(Israel) (France) (Germany) (Canada) Chilik Michaeli, Ina Fichman, Avraham Pirchi, Tami Leon, David Silber, Moshe Edery, Leon Edery	The Flood	Mabul
2011	(China) (France) Isabelle Glachant, Wang Xiaoshuai, Didar Domerhi, Lu Dong, Laurent Baudens, Gael Nouaille	11 Flowers	
2011	(Taiwan) Tseng Shao-chien	The Fourth Portrait	Di Si Zhang Hua
2011	(Australia) Nelson Woss, Julie Ryan	Red Dog	
2011	(Iran) Naser Dehghani Poudeh	Wind and Fog	Bad o Meh
2012	(Indonesia) Garin Nugroho, Nadine Chandrawinata	The Mirror Never Lies	Laut Bercermin
2012	(Japan) Kentaro Koike, Hijiri Taguchi	I Wish	Kiseki
2012	(Poland) (Israel) Marek Rozenbaum, Itai Tamir, Dariusz Jablonski, Violetta Kaminska, Izabela Wojcikl	My Australia	Australia Sheli
2012	(Israel) Aurit Zamir, Yoav Roeh	Off White Lies	Orchim Lerega
2012	Children's Film Society of India	Gattu	
2013	(South Korea) Park Joo-young	Juvenile Offender	Beom-Jo So-Nyeon
2013	(Japan) Yasuhiro Masaoka, Hiroshi Higa, Takeshi Sawa	Leaving on the 15th Spring	Tabidachi no Shima Uta — Jugo no Haru
2013	(New Zealand) Sarah Shaw, Anna McLeish	Shopping	
2013	(Saudi Arabia) (Germany) Roman Paul, Gerhard Meixner	Wadjda	
2013	(Palestine) (Jordan) Rami Yasin, Sawsan Asfari, Maya Sanbar Jamo, Tariq Al-Ghussein	When I Saw You	Lamma Shoftak
2014	(Turkey) (Germany) Yasin Müjdeci	Sivas	
2014	(Australia) Bryan Mason, Matthew Cormack, Rebecca Summerton, Sophie Hyde	52 Tuesdays	
2014	(Russia) Natasha Mokritskaya, Uliana Savelieva	Correction Class	Klass Korreckzii
2014	(India) Madhukar R. Musle, Ajay G. Rai, Alan McAlex	The Fort	Killa
2014	(Jordan) (Qatar) (United Arab Emirates) (United Kingdom) Bassel Ghandour, Rupert Lloyd	Theeb	
2015	(China) Alexandra Sun, Sangye	River	Gtsngbo
2015	(South Korea) Pyun Kyung-woo	Set Me Free	Geo-in
2015	(Turkey) (Qatar) (France) (Germany) Charles Gillibert	Mustang	
2015	(Afghanistan) (Canada) Andrew Korogyi, Asef Baraki	Mina Walking	
2015	(China) (France) Miaoyan Zhang, Guillaume de Seille	A Corner of Heaven	Tiantang Jiaoluo
2016	(South Korea) Lee Chang-dong, Kim Soon-mo	The World of Us	Woorideul
2016	(Iran) Aboozar Poor Mohammadi, Mohammad Hossein Ghasemi	Breath	Nafas
2016	(India) Vitthal Patil, Ganesh Phuke, Mahesh Yewale, Yogesh Nikam, Makarand Mane	The Quest	Ringan
2016	(Afghanistan) (Denmark) (France) (Sweden) Katja Adomeit	Wolf and Sheep	
2016	(India) Vinod Vijayan, K. Mohan	The Trap	Ottaal
2017	(Indonesia) (Netherlands) (Australia) (Qatar) Gita Fara, Kamila Andini, Ifa Isfansyah	The Seen and Unseen	Sekala Niskala
2017	(Turkey) Ömer Atay	Big Big World	Koca Dünya
2017	(Australia) Vincent Sheehan, David Jowsey	Jasper Jones	
2017	(Iran) Mohammad Ahmadi	The Skier	Ski-Baz
2017	(China) Zhao Yanming, Zhang Jian, Li Liangwen	The Summer is Gone	Ba Yue
2018	(Turkey) Banu Sivaci, Mesut Ulutaş	The Pigeon	Güvercin
2018	(Iran) (Qatar) (Canada) Sadaf Foroughi, Kiarash Anvari	Ava	
2018	(Philippines) Shireen Seno, John Torres	Nervous Translation	
2018	(Japan) (Myanmar) Akio Fujimoto, Kazutaka Watanabe, Fumito Yoshida	Passage of Life	Boku no kaeru basho
2018	(India) Rima Das	Village Rockstars	
2019	(Australia) Rodd Rathjen, Samantha Jennings, Kritsina Ceyton, Rita Walsh	Buoyancy	
2019	(China) Bai Xue, Cary Cheng	The Crossing	Guo Chun Tian
2019	(China) Wang Lina, Cai Qingzeng, Qin Xiaoyu	A First Farewell	Di Yi Ci De Li Bie
2019	(Afghanistan) (Denmark) (Germany) (France) (Luxembourg) (Qatar) Shahrbanoo Sadat, Katja Adomeit	The Orphanage	Parwareshgah
2019	(Bhutan) (Nepal) (Germany) Tashi Gyeltshen, Kristina Konrad, Ram Krishna Pokharel	The Red Phallus	
