= Ah Girl (film) =

2026 Singaporean comedy drama film

- Promotional poster
- Chinese: 泡泡糖女孩
- Directed by: Ang Geck Geck
- Screenplay by: Ang Geck Geck
- Produced by: Wendy Lie; Charlyn Ng
- Starring: Ong Xuan Jing; Sydney Wong; Doreen Toh; James Seah; Carrie Wong
- Cinematography: Lim Teck Siang
- Edited by: Hoping Chen
- Music by: Kin Leonn
- Production companies: Aggregate Films; Kusu Films; IFA Media
- Release date: 31 January 2026 (IFFR)
- Running time: 99 minutes
- Country: Singapore
- Languages: Mandarin; English

Ah Girl (Chinese: 泡泡糖女孩) is a 2026 Singaporean comedy-drama film written and directed by Ang Geck Geck. Set in 1994 and inspired by the director's personal experiences, the film follows a young girl caught in a conflict between her separated parents and trying to make sense of it all.

The film had its world premiere at the 55th International Film Festival Rotterdam on 31 January 2026, where it won the Youth Jury Award.

== Synopsis ==
Set in Singapore in 1994, the film follows "Ah Girl", a curious seven-year-old girl who lives with her younger sister Ah Tian, her father and her grandmother in a small apartment after her parents' separation. Her father works night shifts, while her grandmother is often irritable. The girls spend weekends with their mother, whose unpredictable behaviour is often accompanied by gifts and treats. Ah Girl spends her days drawing, quarrelling with her sister, catching spiders and imitating beauty pageant contestants and other adults. She wishes that her family could live together again and looks forward to growing up so that she can make her own decisions. Her ordinary childhood is disrupted when her mother, while drunk, asks whether Ah Girl would like to live with her after she gets a larger home. Through experiences, Ah Girl confronts problems beyond her years and begins an early, unwanted transition towards adulthood.

== Cast ==
- Ong Xuan Jing as Ah Girl
- Sydney Wong as Ah Tian
- Doreen Toh as Grandmother
- James Seah as Grandfather
- Carrie Wong as Mother

== Production ==
The film was developed at the Southeast Asia Fiction Film Lab, where it won the Open SEA Fund Award. It was later shown as a work-in-progress at the Golden Horse Film Project Promotion, and also took part in the Hong Kong-Asia Film Financing Forum and Focus Asia at the Far East Film Festival in Udine.

== Release ==
Ah Girl had its world premiere at the 55th International Film Festival Rotterdam on 31 January 2026 and its Asian premiere at the 50th Hong Kong International Film Festival in April 2026. On 25 April 2026, it was screened for Italian Premiere at the Far East Film Festival in Udine, Italy. It competed in CineVision Competition at the Filmfest München and was screened on 29 June 2026.

In July 2026, it competed in the 9th Malaysia Golden Global Awards at the 9th Malaysia International Film Festival, where it won Best Actress award for Ong Xuan Jing. It was screened in Asia Pacific section at the Melbourne International Film Festival on 12 August 2026.

The film had its North American Premiere in Centrepiece at the 2026 Toronto International Film Festival on 16 September 2026. It also competed in New Voices Competition at the Bangkok International Film Festival and screened on 27 September 2026. It went on to win New Voices Award and Best ASEAN Film award.

It was selected as the Opening Film of Jakarta Film Week 2026 and screened on 22 October 2026.

It competed in Asian Feature Film Competition of 37th Singapore International Film Festival on 29 October, where it won Silver Screen Best Asian Feature Film Award.

== Accolades ==
Award	Date of ceremony	Category	Recipient	Result	Ref.
International Film Festival Rotterdam	8 February 2026	Youth Jury Award	Ah Girl	Won	
Hong Kong International Film Festival	12 April 2026	Firebird Awards: Best Actress	Ong Xuan Jing	Won	
Malaysia International Film Festival	25 July 2026	Best Film	Ah Girl	Nominated	
Malaysia International Film Festival	25 July 2026	Best Director	Ang Geck Geck Priscilla	Nominated	
Malaysia International Film Festival	25 July 2026	Best Screenplay	Ang Geck Geck Priscilla	Nominated	
Malaysia International Film Festival	25 July 2026	Best Actress	Ong Xuan Jing	Won	
Bangkok International Film Festival	27 September 2026	New Voices Award	Ah Girl	Won	
Bangkok International Film Festival	27 September 2026	Best ASEAN Film	Ah Girl	Won	
Singapore International Film Festival	1 November 2026	Silver Screen Awards: Best Asian Feature Film	Ah Girl	Won	
Golden Horse Awards	22 November 2026	Best New Director	Ang Geck Geck Priscilla	Nominated	
Golden Horse Awards	22 November 2026	Best Adapted Screenplay	Ang Geck Geck Priscilla	Nominated	
Golden Horse Awards	22 November 2026	Best New Performer	Ong Xuan Jing	Nominated	
