= Jin Ong =

Malaysia film director, screenwriter and producer

- 王禮霖
- Born: 19 June 1975 (age 51); Taiping, Perak, Malaysia
- Occupations: Film director; producer; screenwriter

Jin Ong (Chinese: 王禮霖; born 19 June 1975) is a Malaysian film director and screenwriter. His first feature film, Abang Adik, has shortlisted for 7 awards at the 60th Golden Horse Awards, and won 9 international film festival awards including the Humanitarian Spirit Award, the Audience Choice Award of the 37th Fribourg International Film Festival, the Golden Mulberry Award, the Black Dragon Award, and the White Mulberry Award for first time director at the 25th Udine Far East Film Festival.

== Career ==
Head of More Entertainment, produced film projects that have been selected for the Golden Horse Venture Capital Conference many times, and served as the organizing committee of two AIM Chinese Music Awards Ceremony President. In 2022, he directed his first feature film Abang Adik, starring Wu Kangren and Jack Tan. The film had its world premiere at the 37th Fribourg International Film Festival in Switzerland, and won the Humanitarian Spirit Award and the Audience Choice Award. At the 25th Udine Far East Film Festival, he won the highest awards, the Golden Mulberry Award, the Black Dragon Award, and the White Mulberry Award for first time director, he became the biggest winner at the film festival. The film was also shortlisted for 7 awards at the 60th Golden Horse Awards, including Best New Director, Best Actor, Best Supporting Actor, Best New Performer, Best Cinematography, Best Makeup & Costume Design, and Best Original Film Song Awards.

== Filmography ==
Year	English title	Chinese title	Credit	Notes
2017	Shuttle Life	分貝人生	Producer	
2019	The Paradise(film)	樂園	Producer	
2020	In My Heart	這一刻，想見你	Producer	
2020	Miss Andy	迷失安狄	Producer	
2022	Girls, Be Ambitious!	女優，摔吧！	Producer	
2023	See You at the Rally	我和我的賽車老爸	Producer	
2023	Abang Adik	富都青年	Director	
