= 37th Singapore International Film Festival =

2026 edition of film festival

- Official poster
- Opening film: The Assassin(s), by Hur Jin-ho
- Closing film: Vintage Violence by Eugene Kotlyarenko
- Location: Singapore
- Founded: 1987
- Awards: Silver Screen Awards
- Hosted by: Singapore International Film Festival Ltd; Infocomm Media Development Authority
- Artistic director: Jeremy Chua
- Festival date: 21 October – 1 November 2026
- Website: sgiff.com

Singapore International Film Festival
- 38th 36th

The 37th annual Singapore International Film Festival took place from 21 October to 1 November 2026 in Singapore. It opened with 2026 South Korean crime political thriller film The Assassin(s) by Hur Jin-ho. Yim Soon-rye, South Korean film director and screenwriter, served as Jury President of the Asian Feature Film Competition.

Rebecca Lim, Singaporean actress and host was the Festival Ambassador for this edition. Indian film actor Aamir Khan received the Screen Icon Award from Peter Chan on 22 October, while Kore-eda Hirokazu was presented with the Cinema Honorary Award by Boo Junfeng on 24 October. The Silver Screen Awards ceremony took place at the Singtel Waterfront Theatre on 31 October 2026. Singaporean comedy-drama film Ah Girl by Ang Geck Geck Priscilla was awarded the Best Asian Feature Film award, while Shahrbanoo Sadat received the Best Director award for autobiographical drama film No Good Men.

The festival closed with comic thriller and dark satire film Vintage Violence by Eugene Kotlyarenko on 1 November 2026.

== Festival overview ==
This section sums up the main things taking place during the festival:

Hirokazu Kore-eda attended a special presentation of his 2026 coming-of-age drama film Look Back, an adaptation of the 2021 one-shot manga by Tatsuki Fujimoto on 24 October. He was presented with Cinema Honorary Award after his In Conversation With dialogue session.

In this edition Screen Icon Award was presented to Indian actor, director and producer Aamir Khan with a 25th-anniversary special presentation screening of Lagaan accompanied by director Ashutosh Gowariker. The festival’s talk series featured South Korean actress Shim Eun-kyung, director Peter Chan, and actor Anthony Wong, who joined a post-screening discussion about his first film role in My Name Ain't Suzie. Several other filmmakers and cinematographers: including Koji Fukada, Akiko Ashizawa, Tom Harari, and Jacob Cheung, attended the festival.

== Juries ==
=== Asian Feature Film Competition ===
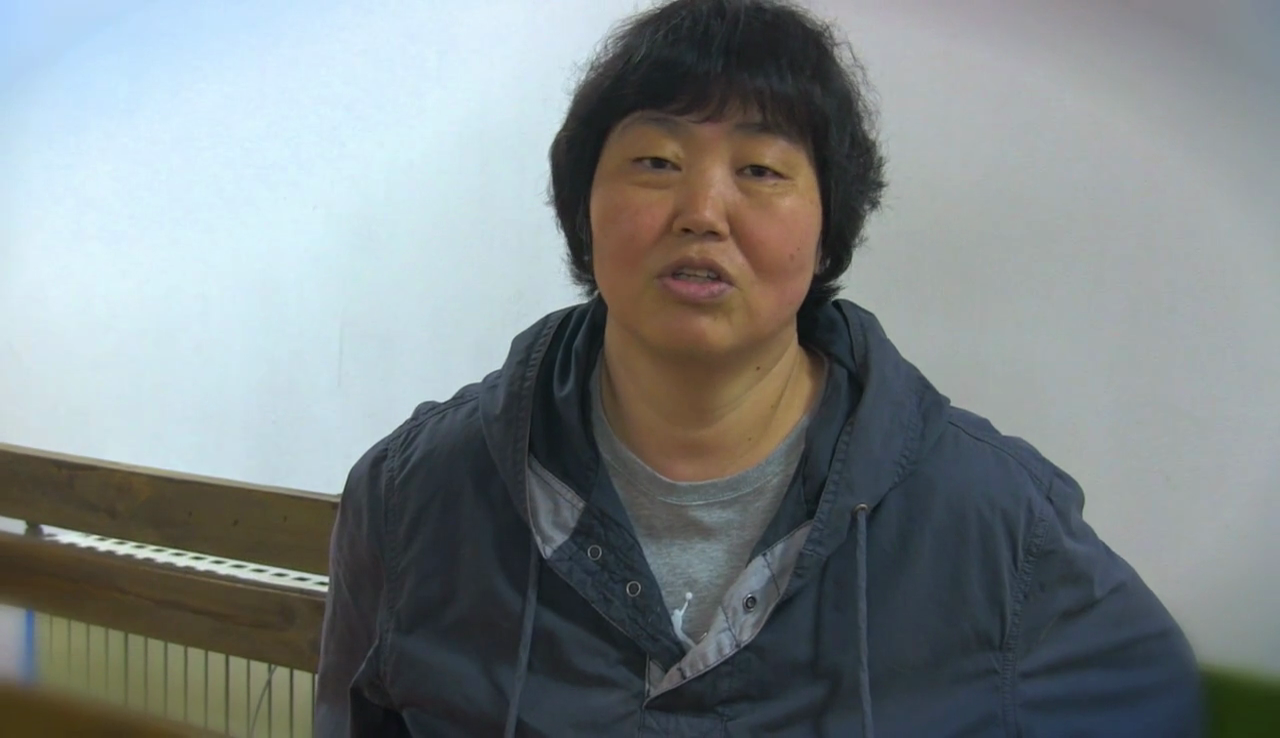
Yim Soon-rye, Jury President

- Yim Soon-rye, South Korean film director and screenwriter, Jury President
- Anthony Wong, Hong Kong film actor, film director and singer
- Sabiha Sumar, Pakistani filmmaker and producer
- William Phuan, Chairman, Asian Film Archive, Singapore

=== Southeast Asian Short Film Competition ===
- Cattleya Paosrijaroen, Thai producer
- Chiang Wei Liang, director, Taiwan, Singapore
- Patrick Campos, Film Scholar, Curator, Academic from Philippines

== Official selection ==
=== Opening film ===
English title	Original title	Director(s)	Production countrie(s)
The Assassin(s)	암살자(들)	Hur Jin-ho	South Korea

=== Closing film ===
English title	Original title	Director(s)	Production countrie(s)
Vintage Violence		Eugene Kotlyarenko	United States, Japan

=== Asian Feature Film Competition ===
It features 10 films, which capture the evolving stories of Asia's cultural landscape.

† Indicates award winner.

English title	Original title	Director(s)	Production countrie(s)
9 Temples to Heaven	9 วัด สู่สวรรค์	Sompot Chidgasornpongse	Thailand, Norway, France
Ah Girl †	泡泡糖女孩	Ang Geck Geck Priscilla	Singapore
Burn	炎上	Makoto Nagahisa	Japan
The Burning Giants	ยักษ์ไหม้	Phuttiphong Aroonpheng	Thailand, France, Singapore, Taipei, Netherlands
Elephants in the Fog	तिनीहरू	Abinash Bikram Shah	Nepal, France, Germany, Brazil, Norway
Four Seasons in Java	Empat Musim Pertiwi	Kamila Andini	Indonesia, France, Netherlands, Norway, Poland, Saudi Arabia, Singapore
The Ink-Stained Hand and the Missing Thumb		Yashasvi Juyal	India, Saudi Arabia, United States
No Good Men	Kabul Jan	Shahrbanoo Sadat	Germany, France, Norway, Denmark, Afghanistan
We Are Aliens	我々は宇宙人	Kohei Kadowaki	Japan, France
Zoom In, Zoom Out	发现之旅	Dong Jie	China

=== Southeast Asian Short Film Competition ===
English title	Original title	Director(s)	Production countrie(s)
Programme 1: Rage Against
Singapore God		Exyl	Singapore
Flame of the Forest		Krityishaa Karunagaran	Malaysia
Programme 2: The Forest Remembers
Golden Island		Arief Budiman	Indonesia, Singapore
Programme 3: Pervasive Powers
The Bovine Comedy		Ratchapoom Boonbunchachoke	France
Programme 4: Surfaces and Slippages
Macho Mystic Meltdown Chapter 2: Monster; She Wrote		Natasha Tontey	Indonesia
Programme 5: There and Back Again
"Vaterland" or A Bule Named Yanto		Berthold Wahjudi	Germany, Indonesia

=== Singapore Panorama ===
This section presents the latest films from Singapore filmmakers.

English title	Original title	Director(s)	Production countrie(s)
Programme 1: There’s Gotta Be More
Everything’s Peachy		Nah Yee Chern	Singapore
It’s Not Sweet		Cheryl Wong	Singapore
Programme 2: Second Life, Second Skin
Kiss Me Climax		Shara Tay	Singapore
Subterranea		Ash Goh Hua	Singapore
REANIMATOR		Syahmi Iman	Singapore
Orang Minyak		Leon Cheo	Singapore
Encik		Ewan Leong	Singapore

=== Junior Explorers ===
English title	Original title	Director(s)	Production countrie(s)
Brave Cat		Gabriel Osorio Vargas	Chile
Julián		Louise Bagnall	United States
Invisibles		Ryo Takebayashi	Japan

=== Standpoint ===
The seven films debates.

English title	Original title	Director(s)	Production countrie(s)
32 Meters		Morteza Atabaki	Türkiye, Iran, Qatar
Amazomania		Nathan Grossman	Sweden, France, Denmark
Baby Jackfruit Baby Guava		Nông Nhật Quang	Vietnam, South Korea
Gaza’s Twins, Come Back to Me		Mohammed Sawwaf	Palestine, Qatar, The Netherlands
Mariinka	Μαρίνκα	Pieter-Jan De Pue	Belgium, The Netherlands, Germany, Sweden
Prosecution		Faraz Shariat	Germany
Rehearsals for a Revolution	خاطرات ایران	Pegah Ahangarani	Iran, Czech Republic, Spain

=== Undercurrent ===
English title	Original title	Director(s)	Production countrie(s)
Corporeal Forms: Four Stories		Chen Wan-Yin, Hsu Che-Yu	Germany, Taiwan
Fire Flower	Hanabi	Ana Vaz	France, Brazil
On Memories of Countless Days Away		Elysa Wendi, Liao Jiekai	Singapore, Japan, Hong Kong
You Dreamt You Saw Yourself But Couldn’t See Your		Shireen Seno	Philippines, United States
September Afternoon		Nicolaas Schmidt	Germany

=== Horizon ===
English title	Original title	Director(s)	Production countrie(s)
All of a Sudden	Soudain / 急に具合が悪くなる	Ryusuke Hamaguchi	France, Japan, Germany, Belgium
The Days Off	Los días libres	Lucila Mariani	Argentina, Brazil, Mexico, France
The Diary of a Chambermaid	Le Journal d'une Femme de Chambre	Radu Jude	France, Romania
Everytime		Sandra Wollner	Austria, Germany
Filipiñana		Rafael Manuel	Singapore, United Kingdom, Philippines, France, Netherlands
House of the Wind	La maison du vent	Bernard Auguste Kouemo Yanghu	Cameroon, France, Belgium, Benin, Saudi Arabia, Qatar
Look Back	ルックバック	Hirokazu Kore-eda	Japan
Josephine		Beth de Araújo	United States
Mayilaa		Semmalar Annam	India
Minotaur	Минотавр	Andrey Zvyagintsev	France, Latvia, Germany
Nagi Notes	ナギダイアリー	Koji Fukada	Japan, Singapore, Philippines, Thailand, France
Nowhere to Lay My Eyes	눈둘데가 없네	Hong Sang-soo	South Korea
Possible Love	가능한 사랑	Lee Chang-dong	South Korea
Rose		Markus Schleinzer	Austria, Germany
Shame and Money		Visar Morina	Germany, Kosovo, Slovenia, Albania, North Macedonia, Belgium
Six Months in a Pink and Blue Building	Seis Meses en el Edificio Rosa con Azul	Bruno Santamaría Razo	Mexico, Brazil, Denmark
Tangles		Leah Nelson	Canada, United States

=== Foreground ===
English title	Original title	Director(s)	Production countrie(s)
The End of It		Maria Martínez Bayona	United Kingdom, Norway, Spain
The House on the Moon	明月共此時	Nelson Yeo	Singapore, Taiwan, Germany, Indonesia
La bola negra		Javier Calvo and Javier Ambrossi	Spain, France
Paper Tiger		James Gray	United States, Brazil
Sleep No More	Monster Pabrik Rambut	Edwin	Indonesia, Singapore, Japan, Germany, France
The Spiral	L'estranea	Paolo Strippoli	Italy, France, Belgium
Teenage Sex and Death at Camp Miasma		Jane Schoenbrun	United States
The Unknown	L'Inconnue	Arthur Harari	France
Vertiginous	Le Vertige	Quentin Dupieux	France

=== Landmark ===
English title	Original title	Director(s)	Production countrie(s)
Amores perros (2000)		Alejandro González Iñárritu	Mexico
Cageman (1992)	籠民	Jacob Cheung	Hong Kong
Lagaan (2001)		Ashutosh Gowariker	India
Macho Dancer (1988)		Lino Brocka	Philippines
My Name Ain't Suzie (1985)		Angela Chan	Hong Kong
Panelstory or Birth of a Community (1979)	Panelstory aneb Jak se rodí sídliste	Věra Chytilová	Czech

== Awards ==
The following awards were presented at the festival:

=== Asian Feature Film Competition ===
- Best Asian Feature Film: Ah Girl by Ang Geck Geck Priscilla
  - Special Mention: Burn by Makoto Nagahisa
- Best Director: Shahrbanoo Sadat for No Good Men
- Best Performance:
  - Pushpa Thing Lama for Elephants in the Fog
  - Putri Marino for Four Seasons in Java

=== Southeast Asian Short Film Competition ===
- Best Southeast Asian Short Film: Golden Island by Arief Budiman
  - Special Jury Prize: Vaterland by Berthold Wahjudi
- Best Singapore Short Film: Singapore God by Exyl
- Best Director: Ratchapoom Boonbunchachoke for The Bovine Comedy
- Best Performance: Sarah Lingam for Flame of the Forest

=== Audience Choice Award ===
Singapore Panorama Programme 2: Second Life, Second Skin, a package of five shorts

  - Kiss Me Climax by Shara Tay
  - Subterranea by Ash Goh Hua
  - Reanimator by Syahmi Iman
  - Orang Minyak by Leon Cheo
  - Encik by Ewan Leong

=== Cinema Honorary Award ===
- Kore-eda Hirokazu, Japanese filmmaker

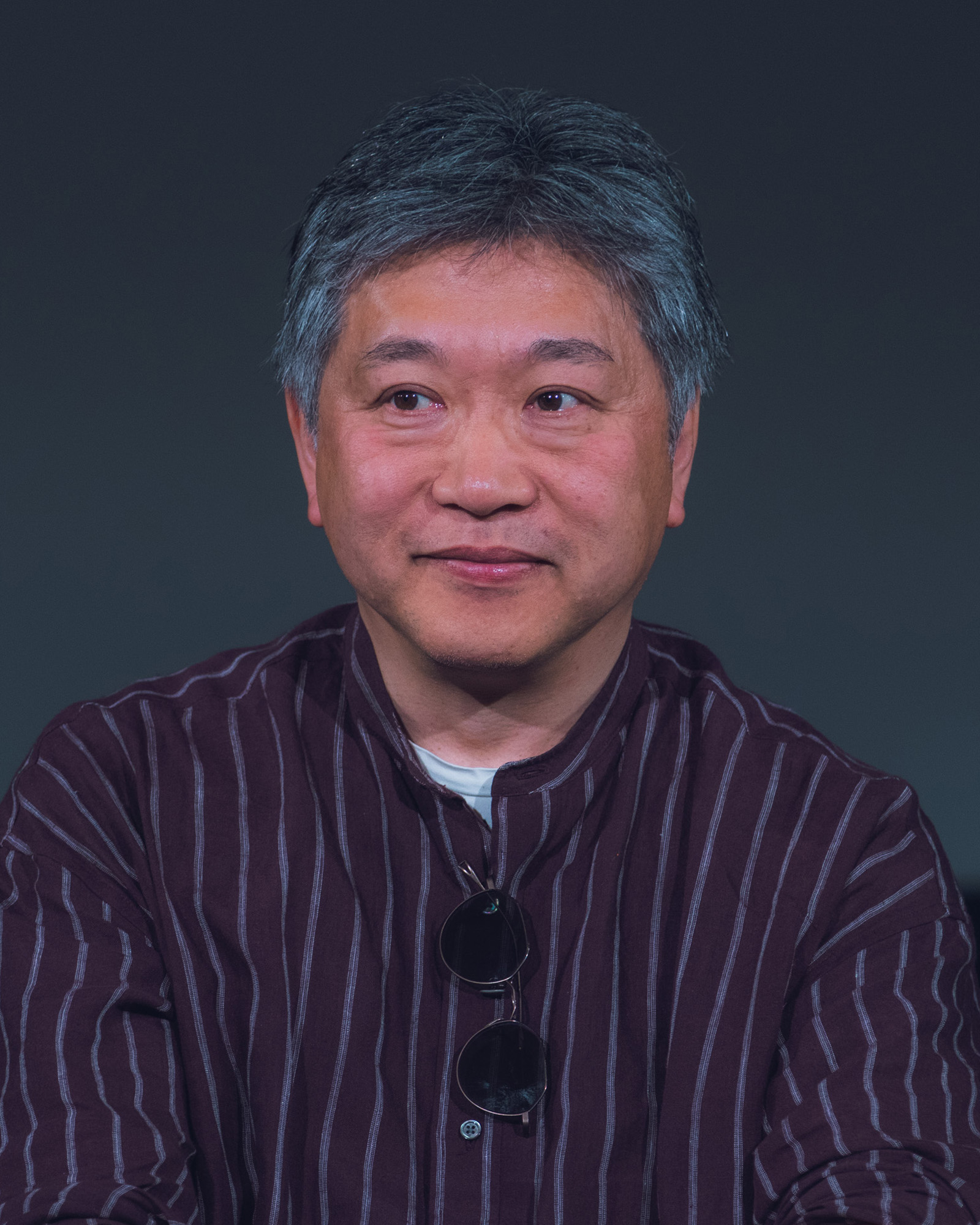
Kore-eda Hirokazu recipient of Cinema Honorary Award

=== Screen Icon Award ===
- Aamir Khan, Indian actor, filmmaker, and television personality

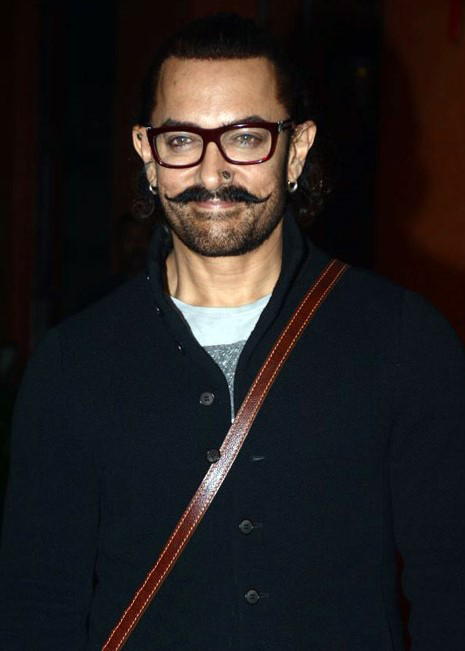
Aamir Khan recipient of Screen Icon Award
