= 7th Malaysia International Film Festival =

Edition of French film festival

2024 Malaysia International Film Festival
- Opening film: Indera (Woo Minjin); Southeast Asian Premiere
- Closing film: Love Lies (Ho Miu-kei); Malaysian Premiere; Peg o' My Heart (Nick Cheung); Southeast Asian Premiere
- Location: Tun Razak Exchange, Kuala Lumpur, Malaysia
- Founded: 2017
- Awards: Malaysia Golden Global Awards
- Hosted by: Jazzy Group (M) Sdn Bhd.
- No. of films: 50 Films (in competition)
- Festival date: 21-28 July 2024; 27 July 2024 (MGGA)

MIFFest
- 2025 2023

The 7th Malaysia International Film Festival (MIFFest) takes place from July 21–28, 2024, in Kuala Lumpur, Malaysia.

On June 24, 2024, MIFFest President and Founder Joanne Goh announced that the festival will honor two individuals, Indonesian actress Christine Hakim and Japanese filmmaker Hirokazu Kore-eda.

== Jury and selection committee ==
=== Preliminary Selection Committee ===
- Feizal Azizuddin
- Elson Thomas
- Tan Mengkeng
- Aw See Wee
- Yasmin Suleiman
- Tony Pietra Arjuna
- Victor Chen
- Tan Xinying
- Charles Kuay
- Syalikh Nazrul
- Roger Liew
- Mira Mustafa

=== Jury Panel Semi-Final Committee ===
- Mahen Bala (Malaysia)
- Hiseh Chun-yi (Taiwan)
- Scott Inglis (Malaysia)
- Kamal Sabran (Malaysia)
- Jeremiah Foo (Malaysia)
- Kong Rithdee (Thailand)
- Zhang Xianmin (China)
- Felix Chong (Hong Kong)
- Zul Ariffin (Malaysia)
- Jury President Suhasini Maniratnam (India)

=== Jury Panel Final Stage ===
- Jury President Suhasini Maniratnam (India)
- Felix Chong (Hong Kong)
- Zhang Xianmin (China)
- Kong Rithdee (Thailand)
- Zul Ariffin (Malaysia)

== Official selection ==
=== Opening film ===
English title	Original title	Director(s)	Production country
Indera		Woo Ming Jin	Malaysia

=== Closing Films ===
English title	Original title	Director(s)	Production country
Love Lies	我談的那場戀愛	Ho Miu-Kei	Hong Kong
Peg O' My Heart	贖夢	Nick Cheung	Hong Kong

=== Competition ===
English title	Original title	Director(s)	Production country
Abang Adik	富都青年	Jin Ong	Taiwan, Malaysia
Betania		Marcello Bota	Brazil
Every You Every Me		Michael Fetter Nathansky	Germany
In the Land of Brothers		Alireza Ghasemi, Raha Amirfazli	Iran
Rapture	Rimdogittanga	Dominic Sangma	India
Sujo		Astrid Rondero, Fernanda Valadez	Mexico
The Editorial Office		Roman Bondarchuk	Ukraine
The Great Phuket	小半截	Liu Yaonan	China
Within a Budding Grove	在少女花影下	Hoby Zhang	China

=== A-Listers ===
English title	Original title	Director(s)	Production country
Evil Does Not Exist	悪は存在しない	Ryûsuke Hamaguchi	Japan
Perfect Days		Wim Wenders	Germany
Anatomy of a Fall	Anatomie d'une chute	Justine Triet	France
Snow Leaopard	雪豹	Pema Tseden	China
Thelma		Josh Margolin	United States
Elegies	詩	Ann Hui	Hong Kong

=== Malaysian Dispatch ===
English title	Original title	Director(s)	Production country
Budak Flat		Eugene Lim, Syafiq Yusof, Woo Ming Jin, Faisal Ishak	Malaysia
Hungry Ghost Diner	餓鬼食堂	Cho We Jun	Malaysia
Everything, Everywhere		Lim Kah Wai	Malaysia

=== Neon ===
English title	Original title	Director(s)	Production country
The Lyricist Wannabe	填詞L	Norris Wong	Hong Kong
Dreaming & Dying	好久不见	Nelson Yeo	Singapore
Manjummel Boys		Chidambaram	India
All the Long Nights	夜明けのすべて	Sho Miyake	Japan
Blesser	그녀에게	Lee Sang-cheol	South Korea
Salli	莎莉	Chien-Hung Lien	Taiwan
Woman Who Cries	A Mulher que Chora	George Walker Torres	Venezuela
Drifting Flowers, Flowing Days	この日々が凪いだら	Yutaka Tsunemachi	Japan

=== Afterdark ===
English title	Original title	Director(s)	Production country
Tenement		Inrasothythep Neth, Sokyou Chea	Cambodia, Japan
I Saw the TV Glow		Jane Schoenbrun	United States
Hood Witch	Roqya	Saïd Belktibia	France
Forest Killer	Lesní vrah	Radim Špaček	Czech Republic

=== Master at Work: Yasmin Ahmad ===
English title	Original title	Director(s)	Production country
Muallaf		Yasmin Ahmad	Malaysia
Gubra		Yasmin Ahmad	Malaysia
Sepet		Yasmin Ahmad	Malaysia
Yasmin-San		Edmund Yeo	Malaysia

=== Homegrown Indie: Open Air Cinema ===
English title	Original title	Director(s)	Production country
15Malaysia		Ho Yuhang, Yasmin Ahmad, James Lee, Woo Ming Jin, Amir Muhammad, Tan Chui Mui, Liew Seng Tat, Johan John, Khairil Bahar, Kamal Sabran, Desmond Ng, Linus Chung, Lim Benji, Bahir Yeusuff, Namron, Suleiman Brothers	Malaysia
Woman on Fire Looks for Water		Woo Ming Jin	Malaysia
Kickflip		Khairil Bahar	Malaysia
Second Thoughts		Khairil Bahar, Lim Benji, Manesh Nesaratnam, Tony Petra Arjuna, Shamaine Othman	Malaysia
Kelab Rojak		Khairi Anwar	Malaysia
Shadow Play		Tony Petra Arjuna	Malaysia
Stone Turtle		Woo Ming Jin	Malaysia

=== Wavemaker: Hirokazu Kore-eda ===
English title	Original title	Director(s)	Production country
Still Walking	Aruitemo auritemo	Hirokazu Kore-eda	Japan
Our Little Sister	海街 DIARY	Hirokazu Kore-eda	Japan
Broker		Hirokazu Kore-eda	Japan, South Korea

=== The Journey of Christine Hakim ===
English title	Original title	Director(s)	Production country
Serambi		Garin Nugroho, Tonny Trimarsanto, Viva Westi, Lianto Luseno	Indonesia
Leaf on a Pillow	Daun di Atas Bantal	Garin Nugroho	Indonesia

== MGGA 2024 ==
7th Malaysia Golden Global Awards
- Date: July 27, 2024
- Site: Auditorium Seri Angkasa, Angkasapuri, Kuala Lumpur, Malaysia
- Hosted by: Alvin Anthons; Chrystina Ng
- Organized by: Jazzy Group Sdn Bhd

Television coverage
- Network: Rtm; Unifi TV; VIU Tv; Facebook Live; YouTube
- Duration: 3 hours
- Ratings: 2.4k (Facebook Live)

MGGA 2024 also as known as Malaysia Golden Global Awards 2024 (Ch: 马来西亚金环奖颁奖典礼）will be held at Auditorium Seri Angkasa, Angkasapuri, Kuala Lumpur, Malaysia on July 27, 2024.

== Special Category ==
Award for Excellent Achievement in Film 卓越电影成就奖	Nick Cheung 张家辉
Lifetime Achievement Award 终身成就奖	Christine Hakim; Hirozaku Koreda
New Hope Award	Betania (Marcelo Botta)
Audience Choice Award	The Lyricist Wannabe (Norris Wong)

For the first time, the Award for Excellent Achievement in Film was presented live during the ceremony, whereas last year it was presented offsite. Additionally, the Lifetime Achievement Award was given to two recipients for the first time, making this year's ceremony truly remarkable.

== Winners and nominees ==
Winners are listed first and highlighted in boldface.

**Best Film** **Every you Every Me (Michael Fetter Nathansky)**: Abang Adik (Jin Ong); Betania (Marcelo Botta); In the land of Brothers (Alireza Ghasemi, Raha Amirfazli); Rapture (Dominic Sagma); Sujo (Astrid Rondero, Fernanda Valadez); The Editorial Office (Roman Bondarchuk); The Great Phuket (Liu Yaonan); Within a Budding Grove (Hoby Zhang)	**Best Director** **Alireza Ghasemi, Raha Amirfazli (In the Land of Brothers)**: Jin Ong (Abang Adik); Michael Fetter Nathansky (Every You Every Me); Astrid Rondero, Fernanda Valadez (Sujo); Roman Bondarchuk (The Editorial Office)
**Best Actor** **Wu Kangren (Abang Adik)**: Mohammad Hosseini (In the Land of Brothers); Bashir Nikzad (Every You Every Me); Juan Jesus Varela (Sujo); Dmytro Bahnenko (The Editorial Office)	**Best Actress** **Aenne Schwarz (Every You Every Me)**: Diana Mattos (Betania); Hamideh Jafari (Every You Every Me); Yadira Perez (Sujo); Yang Xin (Within a Budding Grove)
**Best Supporting Actor** **Jack Tan (Abang Adik)**: Tan Kim Wang (Abang Adik); Tiao Carvalho (Betania); Hajeer Moradi (In the Land of Brothers); Younness Aabbaz (Every You Every Me)	**Best Supporting Actress** **You Junfen (The Great Phuket)**: Serene Lim (Abang Adik); Michelle Cabral (Betania); Rose Ewerton Jara (Betania); Sara Fazilat (Every You Every Me)
**Best Screenplay** **Michael Fetter Nathansky (Every You Every Me)**: Jin Ong (Abang Adik); Marcelo Botta (Betania); Astrid Rondero, Fernanda Valadez (Sujo); Alla Tyutyunnyk, Roman Bondarchuk, Dar'ya Averchenko (The Editorial Office)	**Best Cinematography** **Tojo Xavier (Rapture)**: Bruno Graziano (Betania); Jan Mayntz (Every You Every Me); Farshad Mohammadi (In the Land of Brothers); Ximena Amann (Sujo)

== Presenters & Performers ==
Presenters
Name(s)	Role
Collin	Served as announcer for the 7th Malaysia Golden Global Awards
Zhang Xianmin	Presented the award for Best Cinematography
Zizan Razak	Presented the award for Best Screenplay
Dato' Azmir Saifuddin Mutalib; Daiya Trisha	Presented the award for New Hope Award
Anada Everingham; Jennis Oprasert	Presented the award for Audience Choice Award
Lim Mingchen	Presented the award for Best Supporting Actress
Derek Tsang	Presented the award for Best Supporting Actor
Bront Palarae	Presented the award for Award for Excellence Achievement in Film
Joanne Goh (Founder of MIFFest and MGGA)	Presented the award for Lifetime Achievement Award (Christine Hakim)
Nick Cheung	Presented the award for Best Actress
Zul Ariffin	Presented the award for Best Actor
Kim Dong Ho (Honorary Chairman of MIFFest and MGGA); Joanne Goh (Founder of MIFFest and MGGA)	Presented the award for Lifetime Achievement Award (Hirozaku Koreda)
Felix Chong; Kong Rithdee	Presented the award for Best Director
Suhasini Maniratnam	Presented the award for Best Film

== See also ==
- 2024 Cannes Film Festival
- 60th Golden Horse Awards
- Hong Kong Film Award
- Star Awards 2024
- 96th Academy Awards
