= Jack Tan =

Malaysian actor (born 1991)

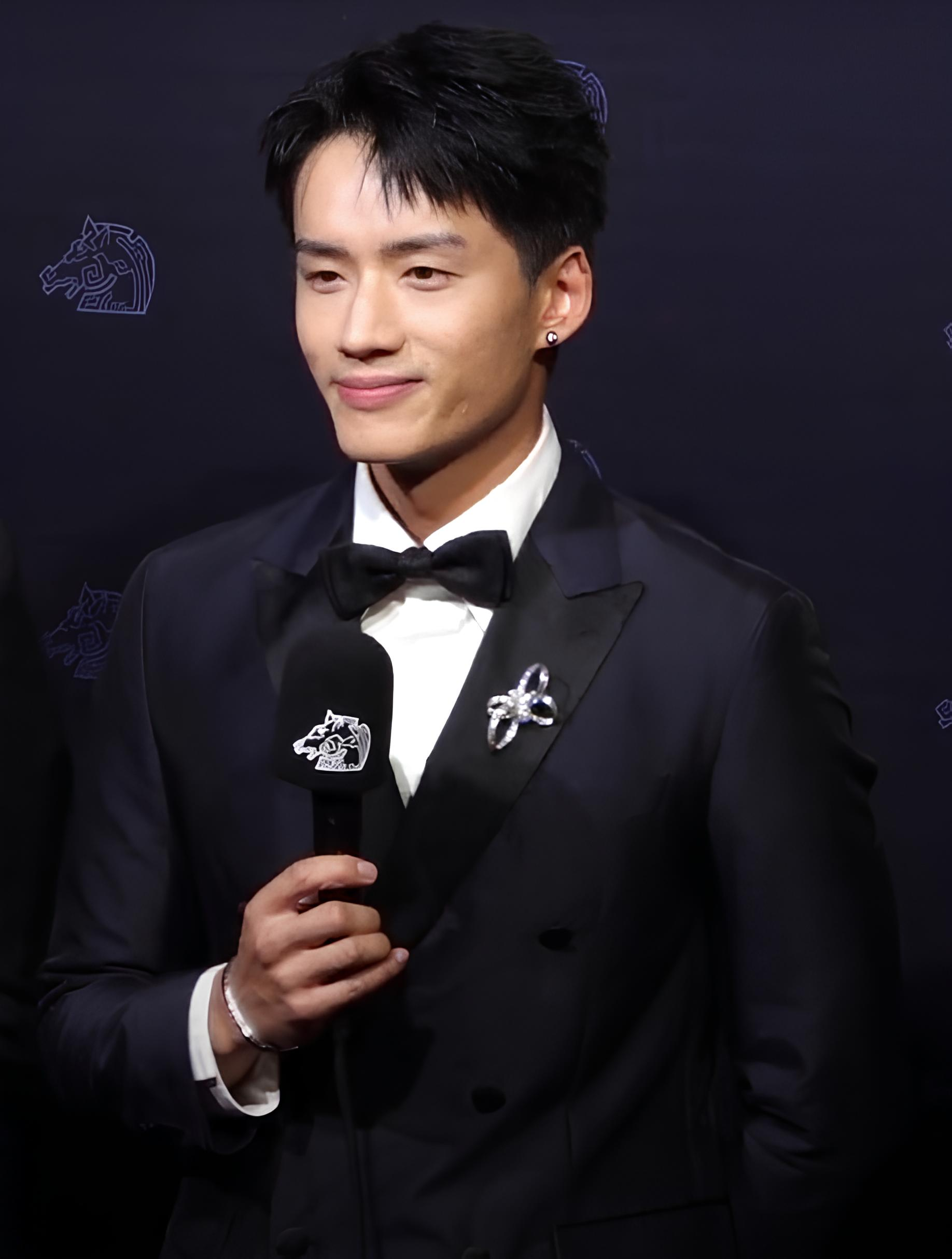
- Tan at the 60th Golden Horse Awards on 25 November 2023
- Born: Tan Chek Yao; March 3, 1991 (age 35)
- Years active: 2009–present
- Height: 1.78 m (5 ft 10 in)
- Spouse: Hoon Mei Sim (m. 2021)

Tan Chek Yao (Chinese: 陳澤耀; pinyin: Chén Zéyào; born March 3, 1991) also known as Jack Tan, is a Malaysian actor, singer and screenwriter. He has received several awards for his films and performances, including Shuttle Life which won several accolades at the New Talent Awards portion of the 20th Shanghai International Film Festival, and Best Supporting Actor awards at the 33rd Malaysia Film Festival and 7th Malaysia International Film Festival for his performance in the film Abang Adik (2023).

== Filmography ==
=== Film ===
Year	Title	Character	Note(s)
2016	Show Me Your Love		
2017	Shuttle Life	Ah Qiang	
2018	A Land Imagined	Jason	
2018	Rise: Ini Kalilah	Leong	
2018	Fly by Night	Gwailo	
2018	Lee Chong Wei	Wong Choong Hann	Guest starring
2019	The Paradise	Hao Ge	
2020	Miss Andy	Teck	
2022	Air Force The Movie: Selagi Bernyawa	Gabriel	
2023	Abang Adik	Adi	
2023	Wo han wo de sai che lao ba		
2024	Gold	Cheah Liek Hou	
	Say My Name	He Chaoren	In production
	Measure in Love		Post production

=== Drama ===
Years	Title	Watak	TV Station	Catatan
2009	高校铁金刚	Wan Anzhe	Astro AEC	First drama
2011	我和我的兄弟·恩	Li Dahui	CTV	
2015	Secret of Success			
2016	Unchained Fate		8TV	
2018	小陈医生			

== Accolades ==
Year	Award	Category	Nominated work	Result	Ref.
2017	20th Shanghai International Film Festival	Asian New Talent Award for Best Actor	Shuttle Life	Won	
2017	12th Chinese Young Generation Film Forum Awards	Best Actor	Shuttle Life	Won	
2018	2nd Malaysia International Film Festival	Best Actor	Shuttle Life	Nominated	
2024	60th Golden Horse Awards	Best Supporting Actor	Abang Adik	Nominated	
2024	17th Asian Film Awards	Best Supporting Actor	Abang Adik	Nominated	
2024	7th Malaysia International Film Festival	Best Supporting Actor	Abang Adik	Won	
2024	33rd Malaysia Film Festival	Best Supporting Actor	Abang Adik	Won	
2025	Kuala Lumpur Film Critics Circle Awards	Best Actor	Gold	Won	
2026	63rd Golden Horse Awards	Best Leading Actor	Dead Tide	Pending	
