= Gold (2024 film) =

2024 Malaysian film by Adrian Teh

- Theatrcial release poster by Dannyhan Miskam
- Directed by: Adrian Teh
- Screenplay by: Tan Pik Yee; Adrian Teh
- Based on: 2020 Paralympic Games by Cheah Liek Hou
- Produced by: Adrian Teh
- Starring: Jack Tan; Farid Kamil
- Cinematography: Yong Choon Lin
- Edited by: Lee Pai Seang
- Music by: Jackey Yow
- Production companies: Astro Shaw; ACT 2 Pictures; Clover Films; One Cool Films
- Distributed by: GSC Movies; Clover Films; Astro Shaw
- Release dates: 11 July 2024 (Malaysia & Brunei); 18 July 2024 (Singapore)
- Running time: 126 minutes
- Countries: Malaysia; Singapore
- Languages: Malay; Chinese; English

Gold is a 2024 Malaysian biographical sports drama film based on Cheah Liek Hou's journey on winning gold medal in 2020 Paralympic Games in badminton (category SU5). Produced by Astro Shaw and ACT 2 Pictures with distributed by GSC Movies, the film directed and produced by Adrian Teh with screenplay by Tan Pik Yee, known for screenplay Ola Bola (2016) and Adrian himself. It starring Jack Tan as Liek Hou, Farid Kamil as Rashid Sidek, Yasmin Hani as Rashid's wife, Wan Raja as Misbun Sidek, Rashid's brother, Freddie Ng as Liek Hou's father, Lynn Lim as Liek Hou's mother, Josiah Hogan as Nova Armada and Fabian Loo as Guan Teng.

Pre-production began in 2023 when Adrian began building a set for Rashid Sidek's bronze medal moment in 1996 Olympic Games in Atlanta. The set was built in Kuala Lumpur, Malaysia based on Georgia State University Gymnasium. Official principal photography ran for two months also in Kuala Lumpur starting in March 2023 with Astro Shaw and ACT 2 Pictures as main producer with the support of APACS Sports. Later in post-production, One Cool Films, who known for The Mitchells vs. the Machines (2021) production and Clover Films announced as associate producers with GSC Movies announced as distributor for Malaysia market.

The film was released in Malaysia and Brunei on 11 July 2024 with Singapore release on 1 week later (18 July 2024).

== Premise ==
Cheah Liek Hou is a prodigious badminton player who has attained an undefeated record through his exceptional skills. However, during the peak of his career, he discovers that he is afflicted with brachial plexus paralysis. Undeterred by this setback, Liek Hou joins the ranks of disabled badminton players and, with the spirit of an athlete, emerges victorious in the world championship. But, tragically, he loses his father, who had been a steadfast pillar of support throughout his life. Faced with this monumental loss, Liek Hou is forced to confront the challenges of life head-on.

When the Paralympic Games announces the inclusion of badminton as a sport, Liek Hou rises to the occasion, aided by the legendary badminton player Rashid Sidek, who serves as his coach. With [Rashid] Sidek's guidance, Liek Hou sheds 20 kilograms and overcomes numerous hurdles to triumph in the Paralympic Games, ultimately winning the coveted gold medal and etching an important historical moment for Malaysia.

== Cast ==
- Jack Tan as Cheah Liek Hou, a prodigious badminton player who got affected by brachial plexus paralysis.
- Farid Kamil as Rashid Sidek, bronze medalist on 1996 Olympic Games in men singles category and coach of Liek Hou in 2020 Paralympic Games
- Freddie Ng as Liek Hou's father
- Lynn Lim Pey Yeng as Liek Hou's mother
- Meeki Ng as Liek Hou's sister
- Fabian Loo as Guan Teng
- Danial Cheah as Ah Fat
- Wan Raja as Misbun Sidek, Rashid's brother
- Yasmin Hani as Rashid's wife
- Josiah Hogan as Nova Armada, another Liek Hou's coach
- Tony Eusoff as Doctor
- Nafiez Zaidi as Physical Education teacher
- Ikhram Juhari as Shafiq Hanafi

== Production ==
=== Pre-production ===
Gold will be fourth collaboration between ACT 2 Pictures and Astro Shaw after the success of Wira (2019), Dukun Diva (2021) and MALBATT: Misi Bakara (2023). It will also marked Adrian Teh's 14th directional film and first in sports genre. It was announced in April 2023 by Astro Gempak that the film will be titled Gold based on Cheah Liek Hou's story on winning 2020 Paralympic Games gold medal.

The casting of the film was announced in February 2023 in ACT 2 Pictures' Instagram with the description of visual age between 18 and 28 years. Jack Tan, who knows for his acting in Abang Adik (2023) as Adi was announced that he will portray Cheah Liek Hou. The film was also supported by Farid Kamil as Rashid Sidek. Farid was grateful for playing such as big name in Malaysia. Farid told media;

“It's not easy to portray an athlete on the big screen, more so when it's Datuk Rashid Sidek who as we all know, is a legend of the sports of badminton. I had to train really hard to have the same movements as him, it's really difficult for me."

— Farid Kamil

Other cast that included in the film are Yasmin Hani as Rahsid's wife, Fabian Loo as Guan Teng, Freddie Ng as Liek Hou's father, Lynn Lim as Liek Hou's mother, Daniel Cheah as Ah Fat and Josiah Hogan as coach Nova Armada.

In February 2023, Adrian visit the film's building set in Kuala Lumpur that apparently have a gladiator look-a-like. He later announced that he would make sports story. On his Instagram post;

Some may argue that this genre is challenging and may not yield great commercial success, they are not wrong. But I have heard this type of comments many times 🥱

— Adrian Teh

=== Filming ===
Principal photography began in March 2023 in Kuala Lumpur with Astro Shaw, ACT 2 Pictures and APACS Sports announced as producers with Guinevere Loh Pei Shan served as line producer of the film. The filming took two months of photography in several places of Klang Valley. For Farid Kamil, he had to lose weight around 20 kg in two months to make Rashid Sidek's look-a-like. He told media;

"I had to train a lot just to master his movements. For me, that is hard. In addition, I even had to reduce my weight from 80kg to 60kg. That took me two whole months,"

— Farid Kamil

“The body transformation turned out to be very difficult,”

“When I was talking to director Adrian Teh, we thought all I needed to do was to eat a lot. Can-lah.

“So every day I ate four meals. But, after a month, I saw that I didn't gain any weight, which was at 67kg. How was I supposed to get to 90kg?”

— Jack Tan

He also thank Rashid himself, Jalani Sidek and Misbun Sidek for assistance in badminton. For Jack Tan, he have to do opposite when he have to gain 20 kg only for four days of shooting. He also told that he ate four times a day for a whole month but ended in a failure after he maintained his weight around 67 kg due to his exercise schedule. In the second and final month, he decided to take six meal a day with foods and drinks such as desserts, soda drink and fried food.

After shooting, he immediately lose weight for Abang Adik film which was released earlier in December 2023. He told that he took six months of production for gain and lose weight only for this film.

=== Post-production ===
Post-production was run in FINAS newly renovated studio for sound that was included Dolby Atmos surrounding. The post-production sound was led by Raja Ahmad Shaidaley from Supernova Media.

Kyle Goonting, who known for Polis Evo franchise, Siti Marzuliana Marzuki and Nabil Abdulaziz officially announced as Astro Shaw's producers for the film. Originally, Luqman Sheikh Ghazali was the associate producer alongside Nabil but left due to Kahar: Kapla High Council production.

== Release ==
Gold was part of 2024 release by Astro Shaw, alongside Sheriff: Narko Integriti, The Experts, Baik Punya Ah Long and Kahar: Kapla High Council. The original lineup also contains the film with PAPA Game On was supposed to release in 2024 but delayed to 2025.

The film was originally scheduled to release on 4 July 2024 with distributed by Astro Shaw, but was pushed back a week later due to change on distribution services by GSC Movies. The teaser was released on Father's Day that shows some snippet of the film. Official trailer was released twice on 24 June 2024 with countdown trailer was released in evening with official trailer released on night, edited by Zoul Zaaba with original soundtrack of the film. The trailer received positive outcome from audience.

== Music ==
"Kita Pasti Boleh"

Single by Kaka Azraff, Daniel Sher and Saint T.F.C.
- Language: Malay
- Released: June 21, 2024
- Studio: HM Entertainment
- Length: 3:03
- Label: Rocketfuel Entertainment
- Songwriter: Daniel Sher
- Lyricists: Daniel Sher (rap); Saint T.F.C (rap)
- Producers: Angela Victoria Chua; Daniel Sher; Faizal Fauzi; Nelson Sim Shein Chuen

Original soundtrack of the film titled "Kita Pasti Boleh" produced by HM Entertainment was performed by Kaka Azraff, Daniel Sher and Saint T.F.C. with Daniel Sher written the whole song and Saint T.F.C. wrote rap lyrics with Daniel.

Official music video directed and colorist by Zoul Zaaba and edited by Izzul Akmal was released on Astro Shaw's YouTube channel on 21 June 2024.
