= Malaysia International Film Festival =

Acting awards given annually in Malaysia

- Current: 9th Malaysia International Film Festival
- Awarded for: Excellence of International and Local Films In Malaysia
- Country: Malaysia
- Presented by: Jazzy Group
- First award: 2017
- Website: MIFF

The Malaysia International Film Festival (MIFFest) is a public exhibition showcasing international and local films in Malaysia. Accompanying this event is the Malaysia Golden Global Awards (MGGA) where the organisation Jazzy Group recognises filmmakers for their significant performances throughout the entire year. Both events were established in 2016. The mission of the MGGA is to let the enthusiasm and passionate filmmakers all around world to promote their films together and to let them to embrace freedom of film making while achieve their dreams.

== Events ==
In 2021, Malaysia International Film Festival (MIFFest) organised a short film competition in partnership with vivo. A smartphone is required during the contest of the 5 minute short-film and the theme of the film is "Humanity".

== Lists of the Ceremonies ==
#	Date	Theme	Venue	Host(s) Main Ceremony	Ambassador (s)	Lifetime Achievement Award
1	28 February – 4 March 2017 (MIFFest); 4 March 2017 (MGGA)		Arena of Stars; Resorts World Genting Highland (Pahang)	Harith Iskander; Owen Yap	Sinjie Lee	拿督黎桂润 Dato’ Lai Meng
2	25 February – 2 March 2018 (MIFFest); 2 March 2018 (MGGA)		Plenary Hall; Kuala Lumpur Convention Centre (KLCC)	Daphne Iking; Owen Yap	Sinjie Lee	许鞍华 Ann Hui
3	14 - 19 July 2019 (MIFFest); 19 July 2019 (MGGA)		Istana Budaya; Performing arts centre Kuala Lumpur	Daphne Iking; Owen Yap	Sinjie Lee; Bront Palarae	洪金宝 Sammo Hung
4	15 - 21 January 2021 (MIFFest)	Virtual				
5	10 - 15 July 2022 (MIFFest); 16 July 2022 (MGGA)	Borderless	Istana Budaya; Performing arts centre Kuala Lumpur	Hansen Lee; Elaine Daly	Bront Palarae	Kim Dong-Ho; Hou Hsiao-hsien 侯孝贤
6	23 - 29 July 2023 (MIFFest); 29 July 2023 (MGGA)	New Take	Zepp BBCC; Entertainment Hub Kuala Lumpur	Alvin Anthons; Chrystina Ng	Bront Palarae	张艾嘉 Sylvia Chang
7	21 - 29 July 2024 (MIFFest); 27 July 2024 (MGGA)	Uncaged	Auditorium Seri Angkasa; Angkasapuri, Kuala Lumpur	Alvin Anthons; Chrystina Ng	Bront Palarae	Christine Hakim; Hirokazu Kore-eda
8	19 - 27 July 2025 (MIFFest); 26 July 2025 (MGGA)	Infinity	Zepp BBCC; Entertainment Hub Kuala Lumpur	Alvin Anthons; Chrystina Ng	Bront Palarae; Siti Saleha; Daiyan Trisha	Ti Lung 狄龙
9	18 - 25 July 2026 (MIFFest); 25 July 2026 (MGGA)	Resonance	Mega Star Arena KL; Sungei Wang Plaza	Ding; Dr. Shaun Stephen; Chrystina Ng	Bront Palarae; Daiyan Trisha; Jack Tan; Zizan Razak	Lee Chang-dong

== Malaysia Golden Global Awards (MGGA) ==
=== MGGA 2017 ===
Category	Winner
The Best Film	Singing in Graveyards (Malaysia, Philippines)
The Best Director	Ma’ Rosa – Brillante Mendoza (Philippines)
The Best New Director	Apprentice 徒刑 – Boo Jun Feng 巫俊峰 (Singapore)
The Best Screenplay	I, Daniel Blake 我是布莱克 – Paul Laverty (United Kingdom, France)
The Best Cinematography	I am Not Madame Bovary 我不是潘金莲 – Pan Luo 罗攀 (China)
The Best Actor	Mad World 一念无明 – Eric Tsang 曾志伟 (Hong Kong)
The Best Actress	Toni Erdmann – Sandra Hüller (Germany, Austria)
Audience choice Award	Hema Hema: Sing Me A Song While I Wait

=== MGGA 2018 ===
Winner

Category	Nominee
The Best Film
The Best Film	Tesnota (Russia)
The Best Film	Blockage (Iran)
The Best Film	A Letter To The President (Afghanistan)
The Best Film	Angels Wear White 嘉年华 (China, France)
The Best Film	Pop Aye (Singapore, Thailand)
The Best Director
The Best Director	Angels Wear White 嘉年华 - Vivian Qu (China, France)
The Best Director	The King- Han Jae-rim (South Korea)
The Best Director	The Seen And Unseen - Kamila Andini (Indonesia, Netherlands, Australia, and Qatar）
The Best Director	Blockage - Mohsen Gharaei （Iran)
The Best Director	Glass Garden - Shin Su-won (South Korea)
The Best New Director
The Best New Director	Kantemir Balaqov– Tesnota (Russia)
The Best New Director	Kirsten Tan – Pop Aye (Singapore, Thailand)
The Best New Director	Huang Hsin-Yao – The Great Buddha+ 大佛普拉斯 (Taiwan)
The Best New Director	Roya Sadat – A Letter To The President (Afghanistan)
The Best New Director	Tan Seng Kiat - Shuttle Life (Malaysia)
The Best Screenplay
The Best Screenplay	Angels Wear White 嘉年华 - Vivian Qu (China, France)
The Best Screenplay	A Letter To The President – Aziz Dildar (Afghanistan)
The Best Screenplay	The Great Buddha+ 大佛普拉斯 – Huang Hsin-Yao (Taiwan)
The Best Screenplay	Pop Aye – Kirsten Tan (Singapore, Thailand)
The Best Screenplay	Blockage – Saeed Roustayi (Iran)
The Best Cinematography
The Best Cinematography	The Seen And Unseen – Anggi Frisca (Indonesia, Netherlands, Australia, and Qatar）
The Best Cinematography	Angels Wear White 嘉年华 – Benoit Dervaux (China, France)
The Best Cinematography	The Great Buddha+ 大佛普拉斯– Mong Hong Chung (Taiwan)
The Best Cinematography	Shuttle Life – Chen Ko Chin (Malaysia)
The Best Cinematography	Missing Johnny – Yao Hung-I (Taiwan)

Category	Nominee
The Best Actor
The Best Actor	Hamed Behdad– Blockage (Iran)
The Best Actor	Jo In-sung – The King (South Korea)
The Best Actor	Jack Tan– Shuttle Life (Malaysia)
The Best Actor	Bamboo Chen – The Great Buddha+ 大佛普拉斯 (Taiwan)
The Best Actor	Thaneth Warakulnukroh – Pop Aye (Singapore, Thailand)
The Best Actress
The Best Actress	Darya Zhouvner – Tesnota (Russia)
The Best Actress	Vicky Chen – Angels Wear White 嘉年华 (China, France)
The Best Actress	Sylvia Chang – Shuttle Life (Malaysia)
The Best Actress	Daphne Low – Aqerat (Malaysia)
The Best Actress	Geunyoung Moon – Glass Garden (South Korea)
The Best Actress	Leena Alam – A Letter To The President (Afghanistan)
The Best Supporting Actor
The Best Supporting Actor	Artem Cipin – Tesnota (Russia)
The Best Supporting Actor	Jack Yap– Shuttle Life (Malaysia)
The Best Supporting Actor	Huang Yuan– Missing Johnny (Taiwan)
The Best Supporting Actor	Leon Dai– The Great Buddha+ 大佛普拉斯 (Taiwan)
The Best Supporting Actor	Geunyoung Moon – Glass Garden (South Korea)
The Best Supporting Actor	Thaneth Warakulnukroh – Pop Aye (Singapore, Thailand)
The Best Supporting Actress
The Best Supporting Actress	Zhou Mei Jun – Angels Wear White 嘉年华 (China, France)
The Best Supporting Actress	Angel Chan – Shuttle Life (Malaysia)
The Best Supporting Actress	Gity Ghasemi – Blockage (Iran)
The Best Supporting Actress	Daphne Low – Aqerat (Malaysia)
The Best Supporting Actress	Ayu Laksmi – The Seen And Unseen (Indonesia, Netherlands, Australia, and Qatar)
Audience Choice Award
Audience Choice Award	Shuttle Life (Malaysia)

=== MGGA 2019 ===
Winner

MGGA 2019
Best Film	Best Director	Best Screenplay	Best Cinematography
Hattrick (Iran); Our Struggles (Belgium, France); A Land Imagined 幻土 (Singapore); My Dear Friend 好友 (Taiwan); Axing (Iran); Still Human 淪落人 (Hong Kong); 27 Steps of May (Indonesia); House of Hummingbird (South Korea); Ode to Nothing (Philippines); Liway (Philippines)	Kim Bo-ra - House of Hummingbird (South Korea); Behrouz Shaoybi – Axing (Iran); Dwein Baltazar – Ode to Nothing (Philippines); Ramtin Lavafi - Hat-Trick (Iran); Yeo Siew Hua - A Land Imagined 幻土 (Singapore)	Ramtin Lavafi - Hat-Trick (Iran); Dwein Baltazar - Ode to Nothing (Philippines); Guillaume Senez - Our Struggles (Belgium, France); Raphaella Desplechin - Our Struggles (Belgium, France); Kim Bo-ra- House of Hummingbird (South Korea); Yeo Siew Hua - A Land Imagined (Singapore)	Kang Gook Hyun - House of Hummingbird (South Korea); Hideho URATA - A Land Imagined (Singapore); Ipung Rachmat Syaiful - 27 Steps of May (Indonesia); Long Miaoyuan - My Dear Friend (Taiwan); Neil Daza - Ode to Nothing (Philippines)
Best Actor	Best Actress	Best Supporting Actor	Best Supporting Actress
Lukman Sardi – 27 Steps of May (Indonesia); Anthony Wong – Still Human (Hong Kong); Amir Hayayee – Axing (Iran); Amin Jadidi - Hat-Trick (Iran); Romian Duris - Our Struggles (Belgium, France)	Sara Bahrami - Axing (Iran); Glaiza De Castro - Liway (Philippines); Raihaanun Soeriaatmadja - 27 Steps of May (Indonesia); Park Ji-hu - House of Hummingbird (South Korea); Marietta Subong - Ode to Nothing (Philippines)	Saber Abar - Hat-Trick (Iran); Sam Lee - Still Human (Hong Kong); Hadi Hejazifar - Axing (Iran); Joonee Gamboa - Ode to Nothing (Philippines); Dominic Roco - Liway (Philippines)	Kim Sae-byuk - House of Hummingbird (South Korea); Mahnaz Afshar - Axing (Iran); Mahoor Alvand - Hat-Trick (Iran); Luna Kwok -A Land Imagined (Singapore); Lucie Debay - Our Struggles (Belgium, France)
Audience Choice Award			
Nina Wu 灼人秘密 (Malaysia, Taiwan, Myanmar)

=== MGGA 2022 ===
The 5th Miffest 2022 is a collaboration with the 24th Udine Far East Film Festival (FEFF) for the competition partnership this year. Both events intend to gain the milestone of making a bridge among the movie industries in the East and the West. The event took place from 10 to 15 July 2022, with the awards ceremony on 16 July 2022 at Istana Budaya, Kuala Lumpur.

MGGA 2022
Best Film	Best Director	Best Actor	Best Actress
Winner: Drowning in Holy Water (Iran, Afghanistan): White Building (Cambodia); Memoryland (Vietnam, Germany); Full Time (France); No Ground Beneath The Feet (Bangladesh); The Silent Forest (Taiwan, China); Two Friends (India); Whether the Weather Is Fine (Philippines); Rehana (Bangladesh); Hail, Driver! (Malaysia)	Winner: Éric Gravel (Full Time): Kim Quy Bui (Memoryland); Mohammad Rabby Mridha (No Ground Beneath The Feet); Prasun Chatterjee (Two Friends); Kavich Neang (White Building)	Winner: Asik Shaikh, Arif Shaikh (Two Friends): Amerul Affendi (Hail, Driver!); Mostafa Monwar (No Ground Beneath The Feet); Sithan Hout (White Building)	Winner: Laure Calamy (Full Time): Neda Jebreili (Drowning in Holy Water); Azmeri Haqui Badhon (Rehana); Deepanwita Martin (No Ground Beneath The Feet); Chen Yan-Fei (The Silent Forest)
Best Supporting Actor	Best Supporting Actress	Best Cinematography	Best Screenplay
Winner: Kim Hyun-Bin (The Silent Forest): Matin Heydarnia (Drowning in Holy Water); Nolan Arizmendi (Full Time); Kazi Sami Hassan (Rehana); Chinnaro Soem (White Building)	Winner: Affin Jahin Jaima (Rehana): Priyam Archi (No Ground Beneath The Feet); Jayati Chakraborty (Two Friends); Yang Kuei-Mei (The Silent Forest); Rans Rifol (Whether the Weather is Fine)	Winner: Lim Teck Siang (Whether the Weather is Fine): Hafiz Rashid, Fairuz Ismail (Hail, Driver!); Xuan Truong Dang (Memoryland); Tuhin Biswas (Two Friends); Douglas Seok (White Building)	Winner: Muzzamer Rahman (Hail, Driver!): Kim Quy Bui (Memoryland); Prasun Chatterjee (Two Friends); Ko Chen-Nien, Lin Pin-Jun (The Silent Forest); Abdullah Mohammad Saad (Rehana)
New Hope Award	Audience Choice Award		
Winner: White Building	Winner: The Story of Southern Islet		

=== MGGA 2023 ===
Malaysia International Film Festival and Golden Global Awards 6th edition captures the "New Take" with a partnership with Taiwan Creative Content Agency (TAICCA), Buncheon International Fantastic Film Festival (BIFAN), and the second year of collaboration with Udine Far East Film Festival (FEFF). This year's festival includes not only indoor cinema, but also open air cinema which will be held in lalaport, Bukit Bintang from 23 to 29 July 2023.

Award for Excellent Achievement in Film 卓越电影成就奖	Aaron Kwok 郭富城
Lifetime Achievement Award 终身成就奖	Sylvia Chang 张艾嘉

MGGA 2023
Best Film	Best Director	Best Actor	Best Actress
Winner: Autobiography - (Indonesia); Directed by Makbul Mubarak: Eraser - (Malaysia) Directed by Mark Lee See Teck; Our Home - (India) Directed by Romi Meitei; Let The Dance Begin - (Spain) Directed by Marina Seresesky; Luxembourg, Luxembourg - (Ukraine) Directed by Antonio Lukić; Plan 75 - (Japan) Directed by Chie Hayakawa; Sunny Side of The Street - (Hong Kong) Directed by Lau Kok Rui; Snow and the Bear - (Turkey) Directed by Selcen Ergun; A Light Never Goes Out - (Hong Kong） Directed by Anastasia Tsang; My Small Land - （Japan） Directed by Emma Kawawada	Winner: Makbul Mubarak - Autobiography: Chie Hayakawa - Plan 75; Lau Kok Rui - Sunny Side of The Street; Marina Seresesky - Let the Dance Begin; Romi Meitei Mayanglambam - Our Home	Winner: Dario Grandinetti - Let the Dance Begin: Amil Nasirov - Luxembourg, Luxembourg; Anthony Wong - Sunny Side of the Street; Kevin Ardilova - Autobiography; Master Priyojit - Our Home	Winner: Chieko Baisho - Plan 75: Lina Arashi - My Small Land; Mercedes Morán - Let the Dance Begin; Merve Dizdar - Snow and the Bear; Sylvia Chang - A Light Never Goes Out
Best Supporting Actor	Best Supporting Actress	Best Cinematography	Best Screenplay
Winner: Arswendy Bening Swara - Autobiography: Henick Chou - A Light Never Goes Out; Inderjeet Singh - Sunny Side of the Street; Jorge Marrale - Let the Dance Begin; Sori Senjam - Our Home	Winner: Stefanie Arianne - Plan 75: Asiye Dinçsoy - Snow and the Bear; Cecilla Choi - A Light Never Goes Out; Kiranjeet Gill - Sunny Side of the Street; Pastora Vega - Let the Dance Begin	Winner: Wojciech Staroń - Autobiography: Leung Ming Kai - A Light Never Goes Out; Misha Lubarsky - Luxembourg, Luxembourg; Johni Meitei & Kangabam Bikram - Our Home; Hideto Urata - Plan 75	Winner: Makbul Mubarak - Autobiography: Chie Hayakawa - Plan 75; Emma Kawawada - My Small Land; Lau Kok Rui - Sunny Side of the Street; Marina Seresesky - Let the Dance Begin
New Hope Award	Audience Choice Award		
Winner: Plan 75	Winner: Adoiii Jiwaku		

== Awards Categories ==
Current Categories:

- The Best Film 最佳电影
- The Best Director 最佳导演
- The Best New Director 最佳新晋导演
- The Best Actor 最佳男主角
- The Best Actress 最佳女主角
- The Best Supporting Actor 最佳男配角 (Since 2018)
- The Best Supporting Actress 最佳女配角 (Since 2018)
- The Best Screenplay 最佳编剧
- The Best Cinematography 最佳摄影
- Lifetime Achievement Award 终身成就奖
- Audience Choice Award 观众票选奖
- New Hope Award 人道主义奖 (Since 2018)
- Award for Excellent Achievement in Film 卓越电影成就奖 （Since 2023)

== Award Trivia ==
=== Impact of the COVID-19 Pandemic ===
The 4th Malaysia International Film Festival (MIFFest) was postponed to 2021 without an annual awards ceremony. The Film Festival was held virtually in January 2021.
