= Therese Aune =

Norwegian musician and songwriter

- Born: 3 May 1987 (age 38); Oslo, Norway
- Genres: Adult contemporary, folk
- Occupations: Musician, songwriter
- Instruments: Vocals, piano
- Label: Riot Factory
- Website: Official website

Therese Aune (born 3 May 1987) is a Norwegian musician and songwriter.

== Career ==
Aune got her formal music education from the music program at Foss videregående skole in Oslo, where she got her Examen artium in 2006. Later she became a graduate of the Jazz program at Trondheim Musikkonsevatorium (2008–11), and was the same year elected "Ukas Urørt" at NRK P3. After her appearance on By:Larm in 2008, Aune was one of three Norwegian artists booked at the Icelandic Festival Iceland Airwaves. She released her debut album Billowing Shadows Flickering Light in 2012, and has performed at several major festivals among them the "Slottsfjell Festival".

Aune plays cinematic music influenced by pop music and classical minimalism. She plays piano, harmonium, and sings, but she performs with a band consisting of Hanna Furuseth (violin), Katrine Schiøtt (cello), Ida Løvli Hidle (accordion), Heida Karine Johannesdottir Mobeck (tuba), and Hans Hulbækmo (drums).

== Discography ==
- 2012: Billowing Shadows Flickering Light (Riot Factory)
- 2026: No Good Men OST
