= No Good Men =

2026 Afghan drama film

- International promotional poster
- Directed by: Shahrbanoo Sadat
- Screenplay by: Shahrbanoo Sadat
- Produced by: Katja Adomeit; Balthasar Busmann; Maxi Haslberger
- Starring: Shahrbanoo Sadat; Anwar Hashimi; Liam Hussaini; Torkan Omari; Fatima Hassani; Yasin Negah
- Cinematography: Virginie Surdej
- Edited by: Alexandra Strauss
- Music by: Therese Aune
- Production companies: Adomeit Film; La Fabrica Nocturna Cinéma; Motlys AS / Novemberfilm - A Fremantle label; Amerikafilm, Wolf Pictures (AF)
- Distributed by: Eksystent Filmverleih
- Release dates: 12 February 2026 (Berlinale); 27 August 2026 (Germany)
- Running time: 100 minutes
- Countries: Germany; France; Norway; Denmark; Afghanistan
- Language: Dari

No Good Men is a 2026 autobiographical drama film written and directed by Shahrbanoo Sadat, based on Anwar Hashimi's writings. Starring Sadat and Hashimi, it follows Naru, the only female camerawoman at a Kabul TV station, who is convinced there are no good men in Afghanistan.

The film had its world premiere as the Opening Film of the 76th Berlin International Film Festival on 12 February 2026. It is scheduled to be theatrically released in Germany on 27 August.

== Synopsis ==
Naru, a 30‑year‑old camerawoman in Kabul before the 2021 Taliban offensive, is separated from her unfaithful husband but is unable to seek divorce for fear of losing custody of her young son. After making a minor scoop by managing to interview Afghan women in the streets, who wouldn't talk to male reporters, she's reassigned to the news department and begins working with Qodrat, a 50‑year‑old married reporter. As they work together, their relationship deepens and Naru may reconsider her belief that there are no good men left in her world.

== Cast ==
- Shahrbanoo Sadat as Naru
- Anwar Hashimi as Qodrat
- Liam Hussaini as Liam
- Torkan Omari as Anita
- Fatima Hassani as Layla
- Yasin Negah as News Manager

== Production ==
A co-production between Germany, France, Norway, Denmark, and Afghanistan, in 2021, the film was selected at the 18th edition of the Berlinale Co-Production Market as part of 35 new feature-film projects, which is an integral part of the European Film Market. In the program the film was first presented at Rotterdam's CineMart and later it was included as part of the special Rotterdam-Berlinale Express programme. In February 2021 the film also won Filmmore Post-production Award at The IFFR Pro awards of the 38th edition of International Film Festival Rotterdam’s CineMart co-production market.

In June 2024, the film project was selected at the 11th edition of the Venice Gap-Financing Market, which ran during the 81st Venice Film Festival, to round off their financing.

In January 2025, it was selected at The Göteborg Film Festival’s Nordic Film Market in the Works in Progress category. In April 2025, the film was considered in the hunt for young talents in the official selection, the Directors’ Fortnight and the Critics’ Week at the 78th Cannes Film Festival.

Principal photography began on 25 September 2024 on locations in Germany - Hamburg, Berlin, Mecklenburg-Vorpommern, and Lower Saxony. Filming ended on 5 March 2025. The districts of Wilhelmsburg and Rothenburgsort were depicted as backdrops of the Afghan capital, Kabul.

== Release ==
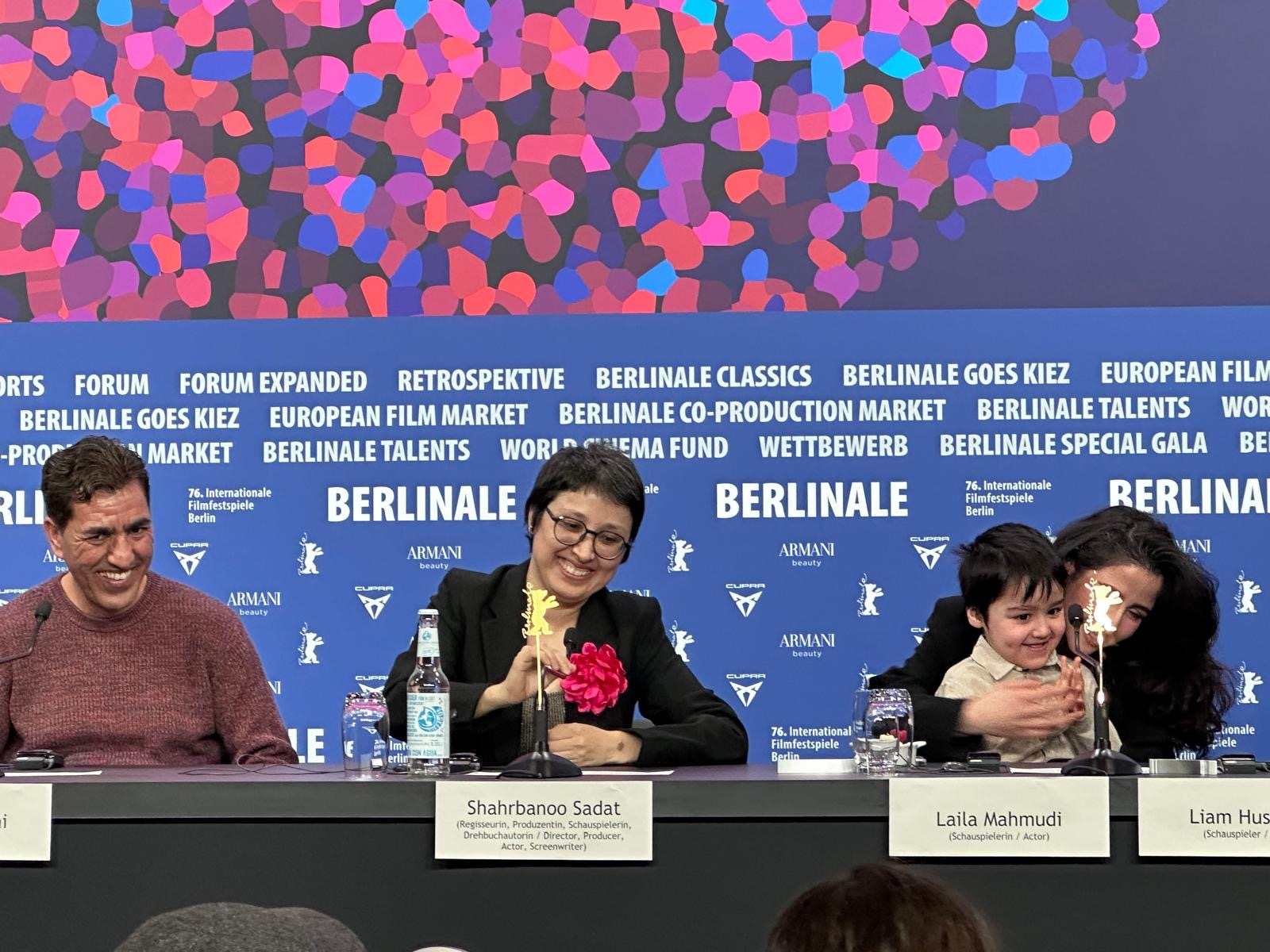
Press conference with the cast of No Good Men at the Berlinale 2026

No Good Men had its world premiere on 12 February 2026, as part of the 76th Berlin International Film Festival, in Special Gala as opening film.

The film was presented at the Sydney Film Festival on 4 June 2026 in Official Competition, where it competed for The Sydney Film Prize. It was screened at the Coca-Cola Open Air Cinema at the 32nd Sarajevo Film Festival, in the Open Air section on 17 August 2026. It will have its Hamburg premiere in Hamburger Premieren section of Filmfest Hamburg on 27 September 2026.

It was also screened in 'A Window on Asian Cinema' section of the 31st Busan International Film Festival on 7 October 2026. and in the 'Journey' section of the 2026 BFI London Film Festival on 8 October 2026. On 10 October 2026, it was showcased in Panorama section of the 2026 Vancouver International Film Festival. It will compete in the Feature Film Competition of the 13th Riga International Film Festival on 21 October 2026, and in the Asian Feature Film Competition of 37th Singapore International Film Festival on 29 October, vying for Silver Screen Awards.

It will be screened in the Open Zone section of the 2026 Stockholm International Film Festival on 15 November 2026 and vie for FIPRESCI award.

The film was released in German theatres on 27 August 2026.

== Reception ==
Peter Bradshaw of The Guardian rated the film with 4 stars out of 5 and wrote, "This is a contemporary romance and the kind of film that tells you things about Afghanistan that aren’t covered in our own nightly news." Guy Lodge reviewing at Berlin Film Festival, for Variety wrote, "The film feels all the more textured and vitally of its moment for its flaws and lapses."

== Accolades ==
Award	Date of ceremony	Category	Recipient(s)	Result	Ref.
Asia Pacific Screen Awards	30 October 2026	Best Film	No Good Men	Nominated	
Asia Pacific Screen Awards	30 October 2026	Best Performance	Anwar Hashimi	Nominated	
Singapore International Film Festival	1 November 2026	Silver Screen Awards: Best Director	Shahrbanoo Sadat	Won	
