= Morad Mostafa =

Egyptian filmmaker (born 1988)

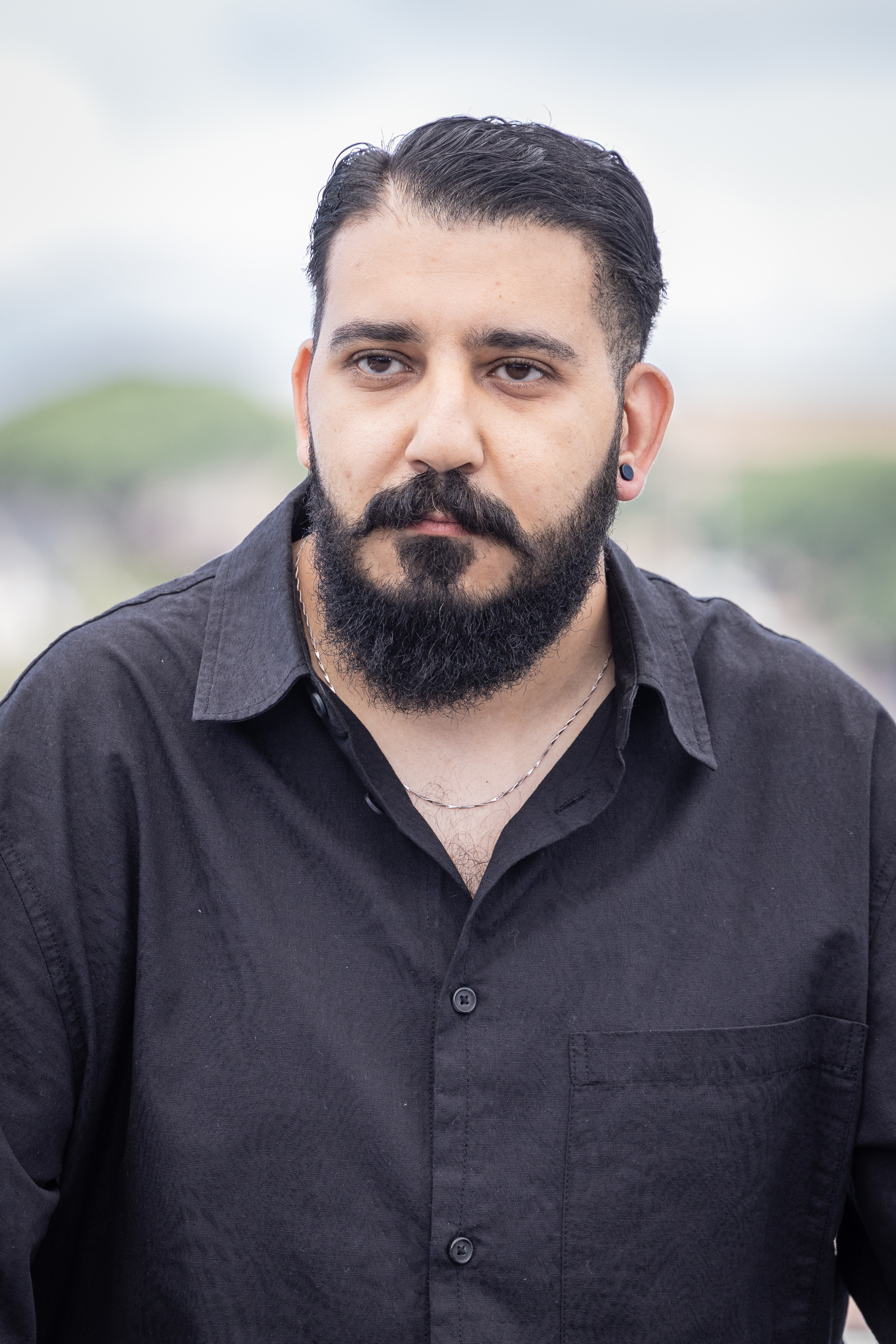
- Mostafa at the 2025 Cannes Film Festival
- Born: 1 December 1988 (36 years); Cairo, Egypt
- Occupations: Film director, screenwriter
- Years active: 2009–present

Morad Mostafa (born December 1, 1988) is an Egyptian film director and screenwriter known for his exploration of contemporary Egyptian social issues, often centering his work on the struggles of women and refugees. His first four short films—Henet Ward (2020), What We Don't Know About Mariam (2021), Khadiga (2022), and I Promise You Paradise (2023)—each received critical acclaim and won numerous awards. I Promise You Paradise won the Rail d'Or at the 2023 edition of the Cannes Film Festival’s Critics Week and was nominated for the French César Awards. His first feature film, Aisha Can't Fly Away, premiered in the Un Certain Regard section of the 2025 Cannes Film Festival.

== Early life ==
Morad Mostafa, an only child, was born on December 1, 1988 in Ain Shams, a neighborhood in northeast Cairo that features prominently in a number of his films.

Interested in filmmaking as a young teenager, he made his first film with a home-video camera when he was 15. He participated in workshops at Cairo’s Cinema Culture Palace and in 2009 had his first on set job working on the series Aghla Min Hayati (2010) written and starring Mohamed Fouad.

== Career ==
Following his first on location job in the series Aghla Min Hayati in 2009 Mostafa worked on several other productions before landing the role of assistant director to a series of Egyptian directors that included Hala Khalil, Sherif El-Bendary, Mohamed Diab and Ayten Amin on her 2020 film Souad (2020), Egypt's entry for the Best International Feature Film at the 94th Academy Awards.

Mostafa made his directorial debut with Henet Ward in 2020. A short drama tackling the issues of racism and discrimination, the story follows Halima, an Egypt-based Sudanese henna painter, and her young daughter Ward, as they head to a henna party in Giza. The film screened at more than 120 international film festivals and won over a dozen awards.

Mostafa's sophomore short film, What We Don't Know About Mariam, followed in 2021. According to the director's notes, the story, which unfolds between a husband and wife at a hospital, reflects strained marital relationships in Egyptian society and how they often reveal themselves in public venues. Another festival favorite that screened at dozens of festivals, the film won multiple awards, including Best Director at the Casablanca Arab Film Festival and Prix de la Critique at the Les Nuits MED Short Film Festival (France).

Mostafa's third short, Khadiga (2022) follows a young mother who starts a seemingly ordinary day navigating the streets of Cairo until the shockingly unexpected happens. The film premiered at El Gouna Film Festival in 2021, went on to screen at over 80 festivals and won awards that included Best Short Fictiion Film Award at the Keff Short Film Festival (Tunisia) and Best Short at the Festival Internacional de Cine de Quito 2022 (Ecuador).

Mostafa's 2023 short film, I Promise You Paradise, centers on Eissa, a 17-year-old African migrant in Cairo, racing against the clock to save his loved ones. It won the Critics Week's Rail d'Or Prize at the Cannes Film Festival, a first for an Egyptian film.

The director set another precedent with his feature film debut, Aisha Can't Fly Away, which became the first Egyptian film ever to win the Jury Prize for Best Film in Post-Production at the 81st Venice International Film Festival in 2024. Once again, spotlighting African refugees in Egypt, the story revolves around Aisha, a 26-year-old immigrant caregiver residing in Ain-shams, a Cairo neighborhood with a large African community.

Aisha Can't Fly Away premiered in the Un Certain Regard section at the 2025 Cannes Film Festival—the first Egyptian film to compete in the section since Mohamed Diab's 2016's Clash.

== Filmography ==
Short film

Year	Title	Director	Writer	Producer
2012	Manikin	Yes	Yes	No
2015	Minus Five	Yes	Yes	No
2020	Ward's Henna Party	Yes	Yes	Yes
2021	What We Don't Know About Maryam	Yes	Yes	No
2021	Khadiga	Yes	Yes	No
2023	I Promise You Paradise	Yes	Yes	No

Feature film

Year	Title	Director	Writer
2025	Aisha Can't Fly Away	Yes	Yes

== Awards ==
Award	Year	Category	Work	Result	Ref.
Cannes Film Festival	2023	Nikon Discovery Award	I Promise You Paradise	Won	
Cannes Film Festival	2023	Rail d'or	I Promise You Paradise	Won	
Cinéfest Sudbury International Film Festival	2023	Outstanding Short Film	I Promise You Paradise	Won	
Malmö Arab Film Festival	2024	Short Film Competition	I Promise You Paradise	Honored	
Whistler Film Festival	2023	International ShortWork	I Promise You Paradise	Won	
