= Aurélia Petit =

French actress (born 1971)

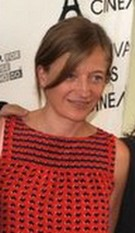
- Petit at a 2012 film festival
- Born: Aurélia Petit; 18 April 1971 (age 55)
- Occupation: Actress
- Years active: 1984–present

Aurélia Petit (18 April 1971) is a French actress. In the year 1984, Petit began her theater career. For a year, she went to theater school with the famous Niels Arestrup. Since 1993, she has been seen in French television shows and movies. She played the clerk, Martine, in Michel Gondry’s 2006 film, The Science of Sleep.

== Filmography ==
- 1996: Le Dernier Chaperon rouge
- 1998: Ein bißchen Liebe (Laisse un peu d’amour)
- 1998: Histoire naturelle
- 1998: Papa ist jetzt im Himmel (Papa est monté au ciel)
- 1999: Lila Lili
- 1999: La Nouvelle Ève
- 1999: 1999 Madeleine
- 2000: Un possible amour
- 2000: La Commune (Paris, 1871)
- 2002: Les Diables
- 2006: The Science of Sleep
- 2006: Looking for Cheyenne (Oublier Cheyenne)
- 2006: Barrage
- 2009: Nord Paradis
- 2009: Louise Michel
- 2008: Musée haut, musée bas
- 2009: L’Enfance du mal
- 2009: Ivül
- 2010: Tournée
- 2010: Monsieur l’Abbé
- 2012: Beau ravage
- 2012: An Open Heart
- 2013: Le Temps de l’aventure
- 2013: Un château en Italie
- 2014: Weekends in Normandy
- 2015: Marguerite & Julien
- 2019: Osmosis
- 2021: A Tale of Love and Desire
- 2025: Love Me Tender
- 2025: Silent Rebellion
