= Silent Rebellion =

2025 drama film

- French: À bras-le-corps
- Directed by: Marie-Elsa Sgualdo
- Written by: Nadine Lamari; Marie-Elsa Sgualdo
- Produced by: Fabrice Preel-Cleach; Emmanuelle Latourrette
- Starring: Lila Gueneau; Grégoire Colin; Thomas Doret; Aurélia Petit; Sandrine Blancke
- Cinematography: Benoît Dervaux
- Edited by: Karine Sudan
- Music by: Nicolas Rabaeus
- Production companies: Box Productions; Hélicotronc; Offshore
- Release date: 1 September 2025 (Venice)
- Running time: 96 minutes
- Countries: Switzerland; France; Belgium
- Language: French

Silent Rebellion (French: À bras-le-corps, lit. 'head-on') is a 2025 historical drama film co-written and directed by Marie-Elsa Sgualdo, in her feature film debut.

A co-production between Switzerland, France and Belgium, the film had its world premiere at the 82nd Venice International Film Festival.

== Cast ==
- Lila Gueneau as Emma
- Grégoire Colin as the pastor
- Thomas Doret as the husband
- Aurélia Petit as the pastor's wife
- Sandrine Blancke as Alice
- Cyril Metzger as Louis

== Production ==
The film was produced by Box Productions, with Radio Télévision Suisse, Hélicotronc and Offshore serving as co-producers.

It was mostly shot in Romainmôtier, in the Canton of Vaud; other locations include Goumoëns and Colombier, Neuchâtel.

== Release ==
The film had its world premiere at the 82nd edition of the Venice Film Festival, in the Venice Spotlight sidebar. It was later screened in numerous festivals, including the 22nd Seville European Film Festival, the 37th Palm Springs International Film Festival, the 46th Cairo International Film Festival and the 36th Stockholm International Film Festival.

== Reception ==
Cineuropa's film critic Fabien Lemercier lauded the film, noting how "a narrative finesse goes hand in hand with simple but highly sensitive staging". Nikki Baughan from Screen International also praised it, emphasising Lila Gueneau's "restrained, emotionally intelligent performance" and "undeniably stunning" Swiss settings. Max Borg from The Film Verdict described it as "a steadily paced journey that is sometimes cinematically conventional but always filled with sincerity and passion, primarily through the strong acting ensemble".

The film received seven nominations at the 2026 Swiss Film Awards, including for Best Film and Best Screenplay, and eventually won the awards for Best Cinematography and Best Editing. It also won Best Narrative Feature and Best Actress for Lila Gueneau at the 26th Fargo Film Festival.
