= Aisha Can't Fly Away =

2025 film by Morad Mostafa

- International promotional poster
- Arabic: عائشة لم تعد قادرة على الطيران
- Directed by: Morad Mostafa
- Written by: Morad Mustafa; Mohammad Abdulqader; Sawsan Yusuf
- Produced by: Sawsan Yusuf
- Starring: Buliana Simon; Ziad Zaza; Mamdouh Saleh; Emad Ghoniem; Maya Mohamed; Mohamed Abd El-Hady
- Cinematography: Mostafa El Kashef
- Edited by: Mohamed Mamdouh
- Production companies: Bonanza Films; Nomadis Images; Shift Studios; Mad Solutions; A.A Films; Mayana Films; Cinewaves Films; Coorigines Production
- Release date: 20 May 2025 (Cannes)
- Running time: 123 minutes
- Countries: Egypt; Sudan; Tunisia; Saudi Arabia; Qatar; France; Germany
- Language: Arabic

Aisha Can't Fly Away (Arabic: عائشة لم تعد قادرة على الطيران) is a 2025 drama film directed by Morad Mostafa, in his directorial debut, from a screenplay he wrote with Sawsan Yusuf and Mohammad Abdulqader. It stars Buliana Simon as the titular role in her acting debut.

The film had its world premiere at the Un Certain Regard section of the 78th Cannes Film Festival on 20 May 2025, where it was nominated for the Caméra d'Or.

== Premise ==
A Sudanese caregiver observes the tension between other African migrants and local gangs in Cairo.

== Cast ==
- Buliana Simon as Aisha
- Ziad Zaza as Zuka
- Mamdouh Saleh as Khalil
- Emad Ghoniem as Abdoun
- Maya Mohamed as Tawfiqah
- Mohamed Abd El-Hady as Mr. Abdel Hady

== Production ==
The idea of Aisha Can't Fly Away was conceived by Mostafa, inspired by his encounter with an African migrant worker in Cairo. In October 2021, the project won a total of $8,180 production grant at the CineGouna, held during the El Gouna Film Festival. In December 2022, it won the Lodge Award for an Arab Project and received a $100,000 production grant at the Red Sea Souk. In May 2023, it was selected to receive production grants from the Doha Film Institute. In December 2023, Mostafa was selected to participate in Cannes' Next Step program to develop the film.

In March 2024, it participated in project development incubator Qumra, held by Doha Film Institute. In July 2024, it received a €25,000 production grant from Berlinale's World Cinema Fund. It was selected to participate in the Final Cut program, held during the 2024 Venice Production Bridge. It won five awards and received a total of €23,500 in grants. In December 2024, it received a €25,000 post-production grant from Atlas Workshop, held during the Marrakech International Film Festival.

== Release ==
Aisha Can't Fly Away had its world premiere at the 2025 Cannes Film Festival during the Un Certain Regard section on 20 May 2025. In May 2024, MAD World had acquired the film's international sales rights.

== Reception ==
Allan Hunter of Screen International criticized the film for struggling to fully capture the entirety of Aisha's story but acknowledged that it succeeds as a compelling human drama, highlighting the struggles of vulnerable individuals in an exploitative world.

=== Accolades ===
Award	Date of ceremony	Category	Recipient(s)	Result	Ref.
Cannes Film Festival	24 May 2025	Un Certain Regard Award	Morad Mostafa	Nominated	
Cannes Film Festival	24 May 2025	Caméra d'Or	Morad Mostafa	Nominated	
