= Shahrbanoo Sadat =

Afghan filmmaker (born 1991)

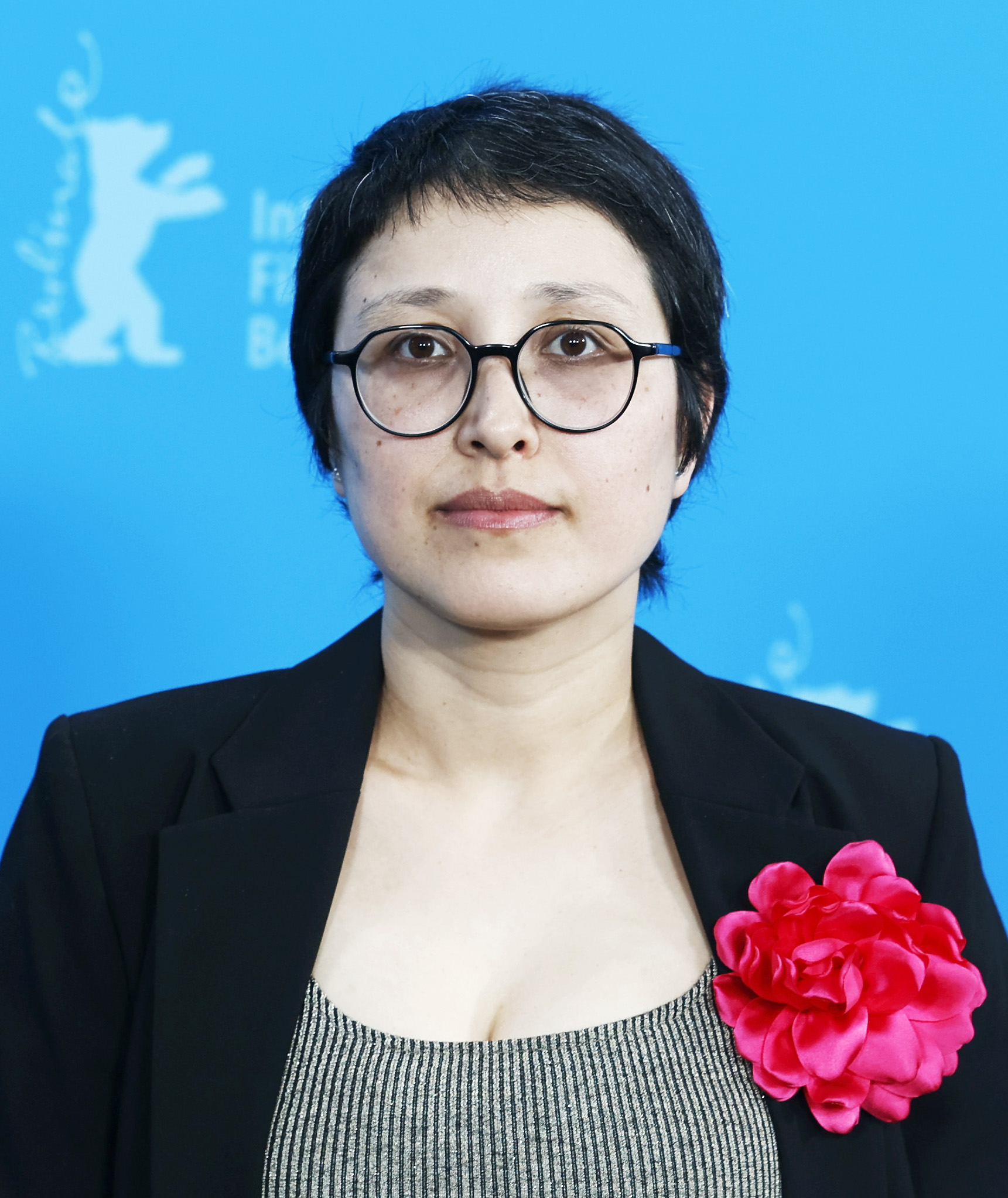
- Sadat in 2026
- Born: Tehran, Iran
- Occupation: Filmmaker

Shahrbanoo Sadat is an Afghan filmmaker born in Tehran, Iran.

== Life and career ==
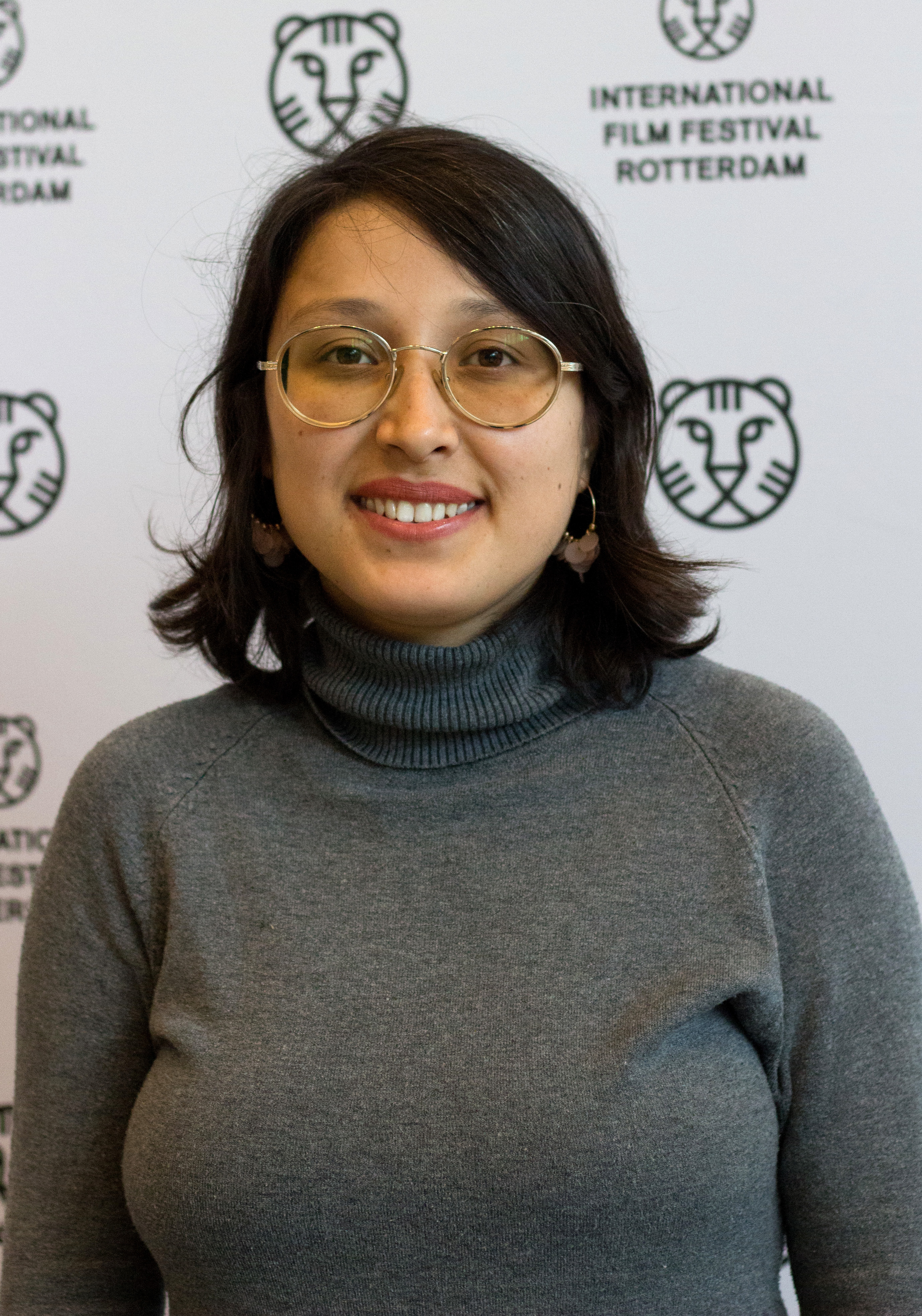
Sadat in 2020

Sadat was born and grew up in Tehran until she was 12 and then returned with her parents to a remote community in central Afghanistan. She studied documentary filmmaking at the Kabul workshop of Ateliers Varan, and began her career working in cinema vérité. Her first feature film, Wolf and Sheep, tells the story of a village much like the one where she grew up. It won the top prize at the Cannes Film Festival's Directors' Fortnight in 2016.

== Filmography ==
=== Feature films ===
| Year | English Title | Original Title |
|---|---|---|
| 2013 | Not at Home | |
| 2016 | Wolf and Sheep | |
| 2019 | The Orphanage | پرورشگاه |
| 2026 | No Good Men | |

=== Short films ===
- A smile for life (2009), documentary
- Vice Versa One (2011)
- Who wants to be the wolf? (2014)
- QURUT, Recipe of a possible extinct food (2019)
- Super Afghan Gym (2026)
