= Wolf and Sheep (film) =

2016 film

- Film poster
- Directed by: Shahrbanoo Sadat
- Written by: Shahrbanoo Sadat
- Produced by: Katja Adomeit
- Starring: Sediqa Rasuli; Qodratollah Qadiri
- Edited by: Alexandra Strauss
- Production company: Adomeit Film ApS
- Release date: 16 May 2016 (Cannes)
- Running time: 86 minutes
- Countries: Denmark; Afghanistan
- Language: Dari

Wolf and Sheep is a 2016 Danish-Afghan drama film written and directed by Shahrbanoo Sadat. It was screened in the Directors' Fortnight section at the 2016 Cannes Film Festival where it won the Art Cinema Award. It is the first installment in a planned pentalogy based on the unpublished diaries of Anwar Hashimi. Its sequel, The Orphanage, came out in 2019.

== Reception ==
On review aggregator website Rotten Tomatoes, Wolf and Sheep has an approval rating of 100% based on 5 reviews, with an average rating of 8.50/10.
