= Abang Adik =

- Theatrical release poster
- Directed by: Jin Ong
- Written by: Jin Ong
- Produced by: Angelica Lee; Alex C. Lo
- Starring: Wu Kang-ren; Jack Tan
- Cinematography: Kartik Vijay
- Edited by: Soo Mun Thye
- Music by: Ryota Katayama
- Production companies: mm2 Entertainment; Cinema Inutile
- Distributed by: Applause (Taiwan)
- Release date: 1 December 2023 (Taiwan)
- Running time: 115 minutes
- Countries: Malaysia; Taiwan
- Languages: Mandarin; Cantonese; Malay
- Budget: $653,000
- Box office: $3.48 million

Abang Adik (Malay: 'Abang Adik'; Chinese: 富都青年, lit. 'Pudu Youngsters') is a 2023 neo-noir crime drama film written and directed by Jin Ong in his feature directorial debut. The film tells the story of a pair of undocumented orphans in Malaysia, Abang (Wu Kang-ren), a deaf-mute person and his indignant younger brother Adik (Jack Tan) who struggle in a poverty-stricken and crime-ridden environment. Serene Lim, April Chan, Tan Kim Wang, and Bront Palarae appear in supporting roles.

Abang Adik received critical acclaim upon its release–particularly for its writing, story, and for the performance of Wu Kang-ren. The movie was a surprise box office success in Taiwan, earning over $4 million during its initial theatrical run. The film went on to receive multiple award nominations, including seven Golden Horse Awards nominations, with Wu Kang-ren winning Best Actor. It was selected as the Malaysian entry for the Best International Feature Film at the 97th Academy Awards, but was not nominated.

== Cast ==
- Wu Kang-ren as Chen Ah-bang (aka. Abang)
- Jack Tan as Zhang Wen-di (aka. Adik)
- Tan Kim Wang as Ms. Money
- Serene Lim as Li Jia En
- April Chan as Xiao-su
- Bront Palarae as a crime boss

== Reception ==
=== Box-office ===
The movie was a surprise box office success, especially in Taiwan, achieving a record NT$40 million ($1.29 million) run in its first ten days. Its popularity led to increased screen times, becoming the first Malaysian movie to top box office charts in the country. The film grossed over NT$98 million ($3.1 million) during its theatrical run in the Taiwanese box office, receiving 388 thousand admissions. In Hong Kong, the film grossed HK$2.5 million ($319,800) in the first two weeks, breaking box office records as the highest grossing Malaysian movie in the region. In Malaysia, the film earned RM5.2 million ($1.12 million) during its first 24 days.

=== Awards and accolades ===
The film went on to receive multiple award nominations, including seven Golden Horse Awards nominations, with Wu Kang-ren winning Best Actor. It won the Golden Mulberry at the Far East Film Festival in 2023. On 22 November 2024, the film won the best film award at the 10th Asian World Film Festival 2024 in Los Angeles, United States.

== See also ==
- List of submissions to the 97th Academy Awards for Best International Feature Film
- List of Malaysian submissions for the Academy Award for Best International Feature Film
