= The Orphanage (2019 film) =

2019 film

- Film poster
- Directed by: Shahrbanoo Sadat
- Written by: Shahrbanoo Sadat
- Cinematography: Virginie Surdej
- Edited by: Alexandra Strauss
- Production company: Adomeit Film
- Distributed by: Rouge Distribution
- Release date: 18 May 2019 (Cannes)
- Running time: 90 minutes
- Countries: Denmark; Afghanistan

The Orphanage is a 2019 Danish-Afghan drama film written and directed by Shahrbanoo Sadat. It was screened in the Directors' Fortnight section at the 2019 Cannes Film Festival. It is the second installment in a planned pentalogy based on the unpublished diaries of Anwar Hashimi, who plays a supporting character in the film. Its prequel, Wolf and Sheep, came out in 2016. It has been nominated for best film at different film festivals. They won the Best Film award at the Reykjavik International Film Festival in 2019.

== Plot ==
The film follows the 15-year-old Qodrat (Qodratollah Qadiri), who at the beginning of the movie lives on the streets of 1989 Kabul and gets by on scalping cinema tickets and peddling key rings. After being picked up from the streets he is sent to the Soviet operated juvenile detention center known as "the orphanage". Here he is one of five new arrivals, along with 14-year-old Masihullah (Masihullah Feraji) and his 16-year-old nephew Fayez (Ahmad Fayaz Osmani) who are given regular meals, living quarters, a primary education.

The audience is introduced to the inner life of the stony-faced Qodrat in Bollywood-style dream sequences in which he is free to express his feelings for a girl in class or one of his close pals. Dorm-room power scuffles ensue, sometimes broken up by Anwar (Anwar Hashimi), who takes on a patriarchal role in the Orphanage as a supervisor. While at the orphanage, the young boys experience some difficulty with the institution and with each other. At the beginning of Qodrat's stay at the orphanage, he is alone, but as the film continues, he develops friendships with the boys he entered with. The film chooses to focus on more of the happy, coming-of-age moments in the film but also hints at the difficulties of life in Afghanistan at the time. The boys talk about basic things like girls, music, sports, and movies, but their want for these things is heightened by the lack of access to them in the orphanage. In one scene, Masihullah Feraji is sent to a mental institution after stalking a female teacher in her sleep. In another pivotal scene in the film, a young boy dies after trying to fashion a necklace from a bullet he found while playing outside. Some of the boys are taken on an excursion to Moscow, where they get to use computers and compete in chess with their fellow young comrades. This life is again upturned when teachers struggle to toe the line of the Mujahideen after the Soviets withdrew from Afghanistan.

This story is based on the unreleased diaries of Anwar Hashimi, who played the role of the supervisor in the film. The director, Shahrbanoo Sadat, was from the same village as Hashimi, therefore using his diaries felt personal for her as well. The characters, Sediqa and Qodrat, are based on them in both of the films.

== Production ==
Following Sadat's previous film, Wolf and Sheep, the director reused the main actors, Qodrat and Sediqa, in The Orphanage. The rest of the actors were cast from a pool of 20,000 highschool students around the Kabul area. After some convincing, Sadat cast Anwar Hashmi as the orphanage supervisor.

All of the speaking cast in "The Orphanage" came from Afghanistan, while other actors in non-speaking roles came from either Tajikistan, Denmark, or Germany. Much of the movie was shot in Tajikistan, with some other scenes, like the more stylized Bollywood dream sequences, shot in Denmark. The scenes where the young boys go to a Soviet summer camp were shot in Germany. Sadat describes obtaining the visas and permission to film in these countries as difficult, especially with an Afghanistani passport. Despite multiple rejections, Sadat and the rest of the production crew were persistent about obtaining the necessary visas and managed to do so.

Anwar Hashmi's 800 page unpublished autobiographical text heavily inspired both Wolf and Sheep and The Orphanage. Shahrbanoo Sadat and Anwar Hashmi met in 2009 while shooting at a TV station in Kabul. From then on, she has been collecting pages from Hashmi's diary and transforming some of their events into film. Sadat believes Hashmi's diary to be a personal and historical recollection of the last 40 years in Afghanistan that should be published or understood by the world. She plans on making a pentalogy, or collection of 5 films, using Hashmi's diary as the primary source material.

== Cast ==
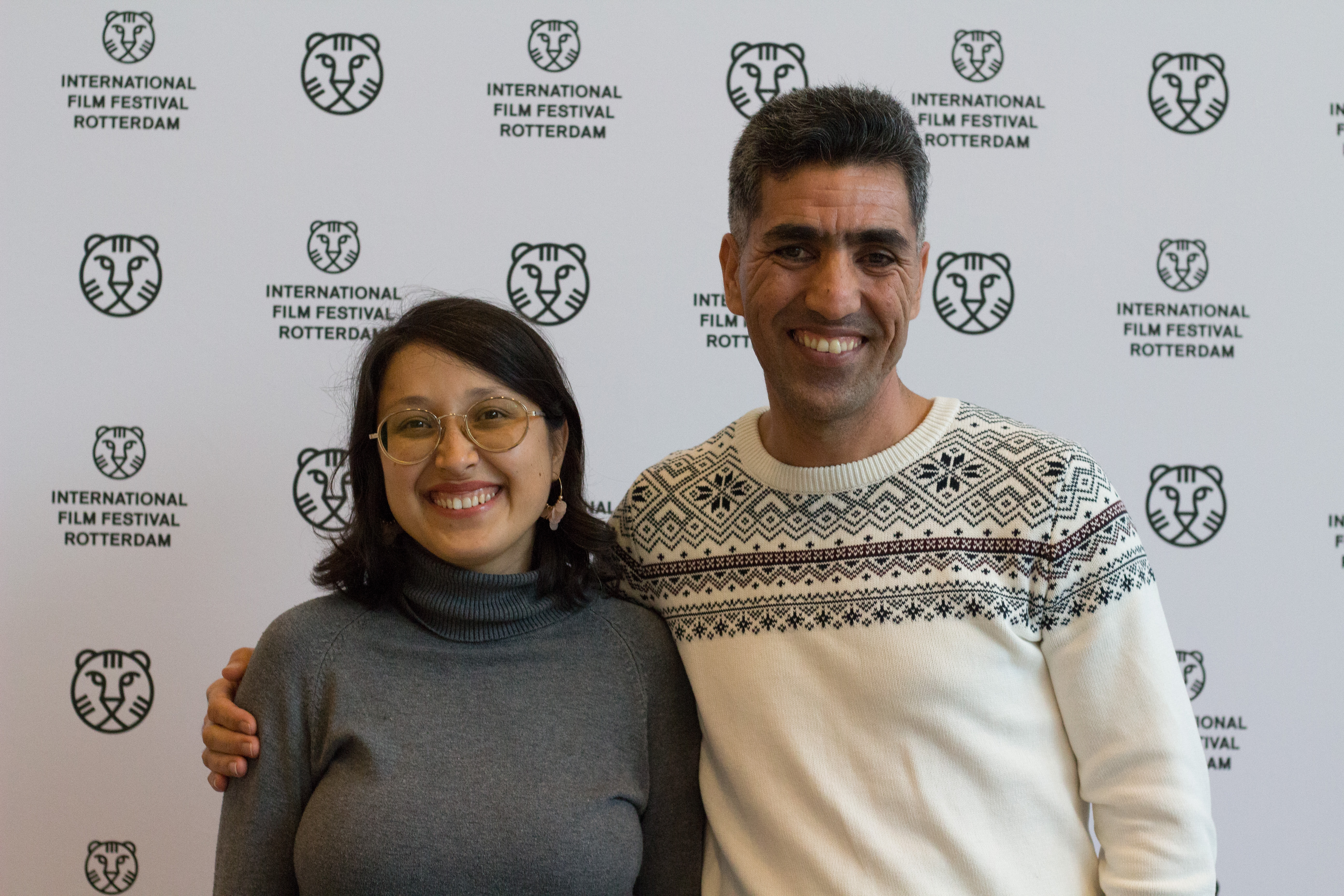
Director Shahrbanoo Sadat and Anwar Hashimi at the Rotterdam International Film Festival 2020

- Qodratollah Qadiri
- Hasibullah Rasooli
- Masihullah Feraji
- Sediqa Rasuli
- Anwar Hashimi
- Ehasanulla Kharoty
- Nahid Yakmanesh

== Reception ==
On review aggregator website Rotten Tomatoes, the film holds an approval rating of 91% based on 22 reviews. Jay Weissberg of Variety magazine called The Orphanage a "clumsy Bollywood re-creation" that "add[s] significant flavor". Peter Bradshaw of The Guardian, called the film "energetic and captivating drama". Carlos Aguilar of Los Angeles Times, called the film, "an imperfect yet charming blend of Bollywood and Soviet Afghanistan."
