= Far East Film Festival =

Annual film festival held in Udine, Italy

- Location: Udine, Italy
- Founded: 1999
- Most recent: 2026
- Hosted by: Direzione Artistica E Organizzazione
- Artistic director: Max Mestroni
- Festival date: Opening: 24 April 2026; Closing: 2 May 2026
- Website: fareastfilm.com

Current: 28th
- 29th 27th

Far East Film Festival (FEFF) is an annual film festival held in Udine, Italy. It is one of the most important events promoting Asian Cinema in Europe. It focuses mainly on the films from East Asia.

In 2023, the festival celebrating its 25th anniversary edition from April 21 to April 29, focused on the Asian films of the 1980s.

== Prizes ==
- Golden Mulberry
- Silver Mulberry
- Crystal Mulberry
- Black Dragon Audience Award
- White Mulberry Award (first time director)
- Mulberry Award (best screenplay)

== Golden Mulberry winners ==
Year	Film	Director	Country	Ref.
1999	A Hero Never Dies	Johnnie To	Hong Kong	
2000	Shower (ex aequo)	Zhang Yang	China	
2000	My Heart (ex aequo)	Bae Chang-ho	South Korea	
2001	The Foul King	Kim Jee-woon	South Korea	
2002	Love Undercover	Joe Ma	Hong Kong	
2003	Infernal Affairs	Andrew Lau & Alan Mak	Hong Kong	
2004	The Twilight Samurai	Yoji Yamada	Japan	
2005	Peacock	Gu Changwei	China	
2006	Welcome to Dongmakgol	Park Kwang-hyun	South Korea	
2007	No Mercy for the Rude	Park Chul-hee	South Korea	
2008	Gachi Boy	Norihiro Koizumi	Japan	
2009	Departures	Yōjirō Takita	Japan	
2010	Castaway on the Moon	Lee Hey-jun	South Korea	
2011	Aftershock	Feng Xiaogang	China	
2012	Silenced	Hwang Dong-hyuk	South Korea	
2013	How to Use Guys with Secret Tips	Lee Won-suk	South Korea	
2014	The Eternal Zero	Takashi Yamazaki	Japan	
2015	Ode to My Father	Yoon Je-kyoon	South Korea	
2016	A Melody to Remember	Lee Han	South Korea	
2017	Close-Knit	Naoko Ogigami	Japan	
2018	1987: When the Day Comes	Jang Joon-hwan	South Korea	
2019	Still Human	Oliver Chan	Hong Kong	
2020	Better Days	Derek Tsang	China	
2021	Midnight Swan	Eiji Uchida	Japan	
2022	Miracle: Letters to the President	Lee Jang-hoon	South Korea	
2023	Abang Adik	Jin Ong	Malaysia	
2024	Takano Tofu	Mitsuhiro Mihara	Japan	
2025	Her Story	Shao Yihui	China	
2026	Fujiko	Taichi Kimura	Japan	
