= Shuttle Life =

- Theatrical release poster
- Chinese: 分貝人生
- Hanyu Pinyin: Fēn bèi rén shēng
- Directed by: Tan Seng Kiat
- Written by: Tan Seng Kiat; Chris Leong
- Produced by: Roland Lee; Jin Ong
- Starring: Jack Tan; Sylvia Chang; Angel Chan
- Cinematography: Chen Ko-chin
- Edited by: Chen Hsiao-tung; Yue Ba Ren Zi
- Music by: Onn San
- Production companies: More Entertainment; Golden Wheel Trading; Hershlag; Harmonics
- Distributed by: mm2 Entertainment
- Release date: October 12, 2017
- Running time: 91 minutes
- Country: Malaysia
- Languages: Mandarin; Cantonese; Malay
- Budget: RM2 million
- Box office: NT$246,013 (Taiwan)

Shuttle Life is a 2017 Malaysian drama film directed by Tan Seng Kiat, starring Jack Tan, Sylvia Chang and Angel Chan. The film was scheduled to be released on October 12, 2017.

== Cast ==
- Jack Tan as Qiang
- Sylvia Chang as Li Jun
- Angel Chan as Hui Shan
- Gan Mei Yan as Xiao Chuan
- Juztin Lan as Bao Tou
- Jack Yap as Fei

== Production ==
Shuttle Life received support from National Film Development Corporation Malaysia. In 2014, the film won the top prize of NT$1 million cash grant from the Golden Horse Film Project Promotion (FPP). Filming took place over the course of 21 days in Pudu, Kuala Lumpur, Malaysia, in 2016.

== Awards and nominations ==
Award	Category	Recipients	Result	Ref.
12th Chinese Young Generation Film Forum Awards	Best Actor	Jack Tan	Won	
12th Chinese Young Generation Film Forum Awards	Best Cinematography	Chen Ko-chin	Won	
12th Chinese Young Generation Film Forum Awards	Best Production Design	Lim Chik Fong	Won	
54th Golden Horse Awards	Best New Director	Tan Seng Kiat	Nominated	
54th Golden Horse Awards	Best Cinematography	Chen Ko-chin	Nominated	
29th Malaysia Film Festival	Special Jury Award	Shuttle Life	Won	
29th Malaysia Film Festival	Best Director	Tan Seng Kiat	Nominated	
29th Malaysia Film Festival	Best Actor	Jack Tan	Nominated	
20th Shanghai International Film Festival	Asian New Talent - Best Film	Shuttle Life	Won	
20th Shanghai International Film Festival	Asian New Talent - Best Actor	Jack Tan	Won	
20th Shanghai International Film Festival	Asian New Talent - Best Cinematographer	Chen Ko-chin	Won	
