= 8th Malaysia International Film Festival =

2025 edition of Malaysian film festival

2025 Malaysia International Film Festival
- Festival poster
- Opening film: Ninavau (Bebbra Mailin); World Premiere
- Closing film: Transamazonia (Pia Marais); Malaysian Premiere
- Location: Kuala Lumpur
- Founded: 2017
- Awards: Malaysia Golden Global Awards
- Hosted by: Opening Ceremony Emcee; Dingding; Organized by Jazzy Group (M) Sdn Bhd
- No. of films: 62 films (in competition)
- Festival date: 19 - 27 July 2025; 26 July 2025 (MGGA)
- Website: MIFFest 2025

MIFFest
- 2026 2024

The 8th Malaysia International Film Festival (MIFFest) took place from July 19 to July 27, 2025, in Kuala Lumpur, Malaysia. Bront Palarae, was joined by Siti Saleha and Daiyan Trisha as the brand ambassadors of the festival. The festival opened with a Malaysian film exploring cultural identity and emotional heritage titled Ninavau by Bebbra Mailin. It closed with 2024 coming-of-age film Transamazonia by Pia Marais.

== Opening and closing ceremonies ==
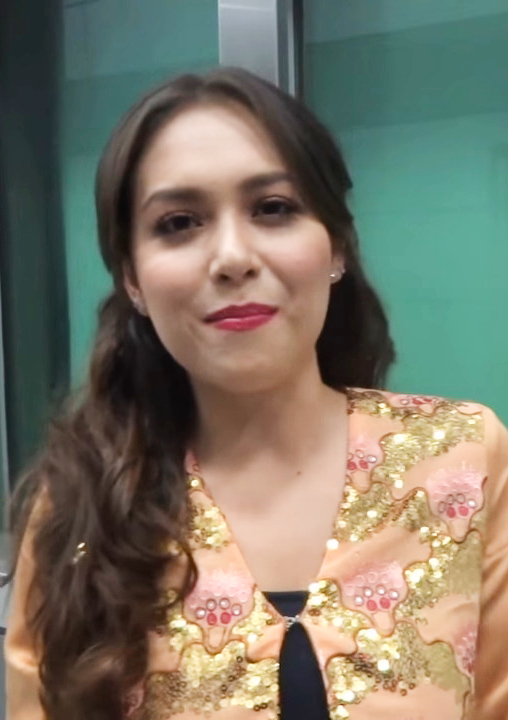
Siti Saleha, brand ambassador

The opening ceremony was held on 19 July 2025 at Sunken Garden, MyTOWN Shopping Centre. Festival ambassadors Siti Saleha, Daiyan Trisha, and Bront Palarae welcomed the guests attending the festival. This year the MIFFest showcased 65 films from 48 countries in over 43 languages, starting with the opening film Ninavau, a feature film depicting Sabahan and Kadazan culture.

- ASEAN On Screen

The highlight of this edition is launch of ASEAN On Screen, a new industry initiative aimed at showcasing Southeast Asia’s creative content and talent to viewers around the world.

== Jury and Selection Committee ==
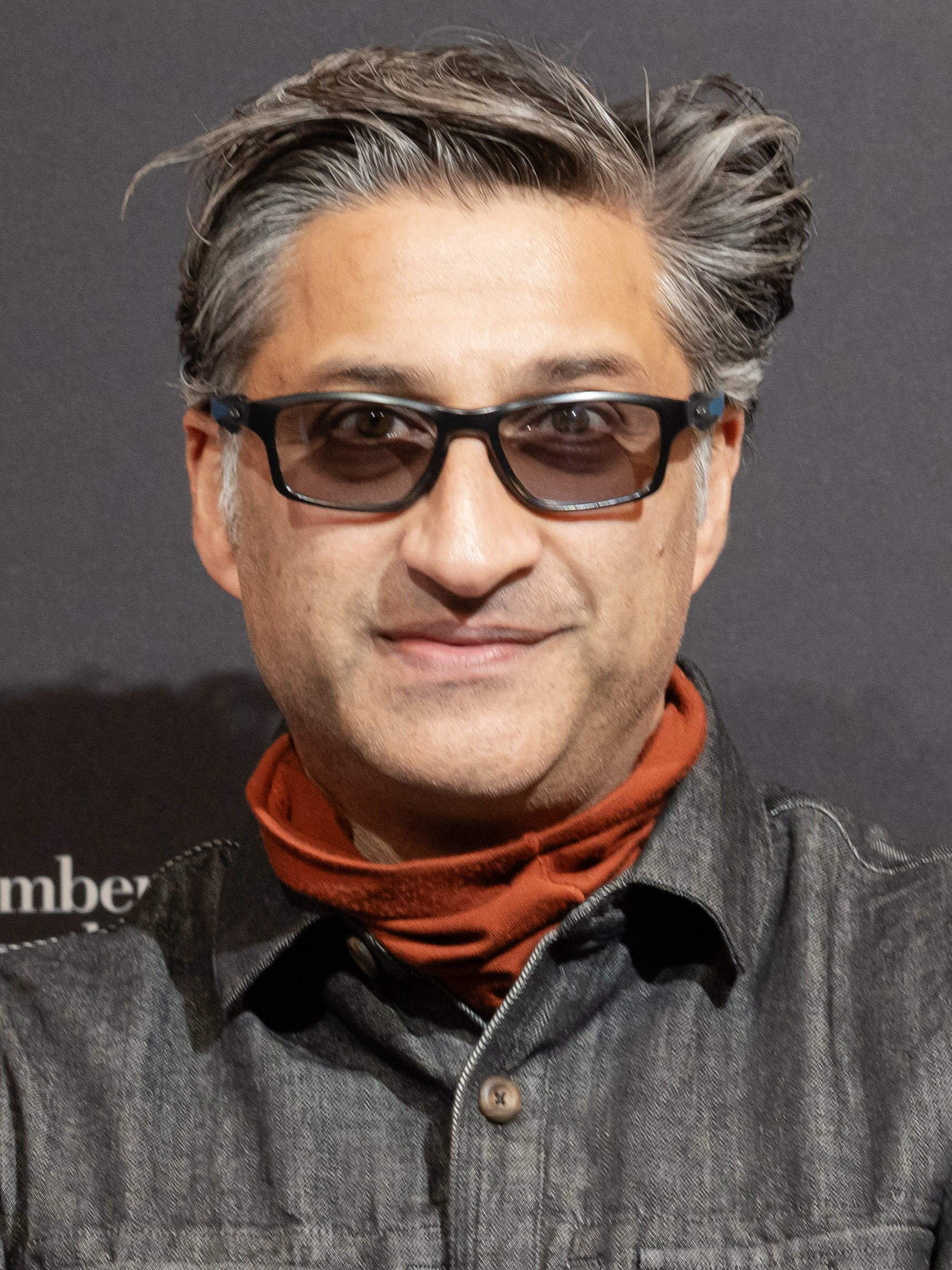
Asif Kapadia, Jury President

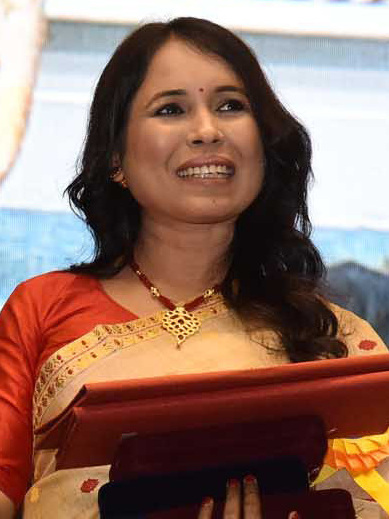
Rima Das, Jury Member

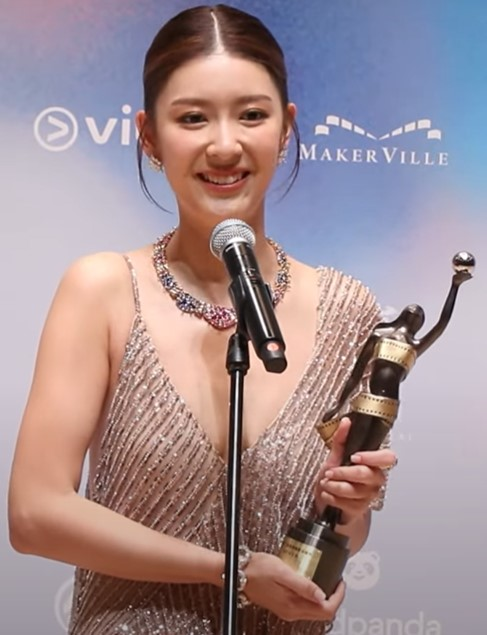
Jennifer Yu, Jury Member

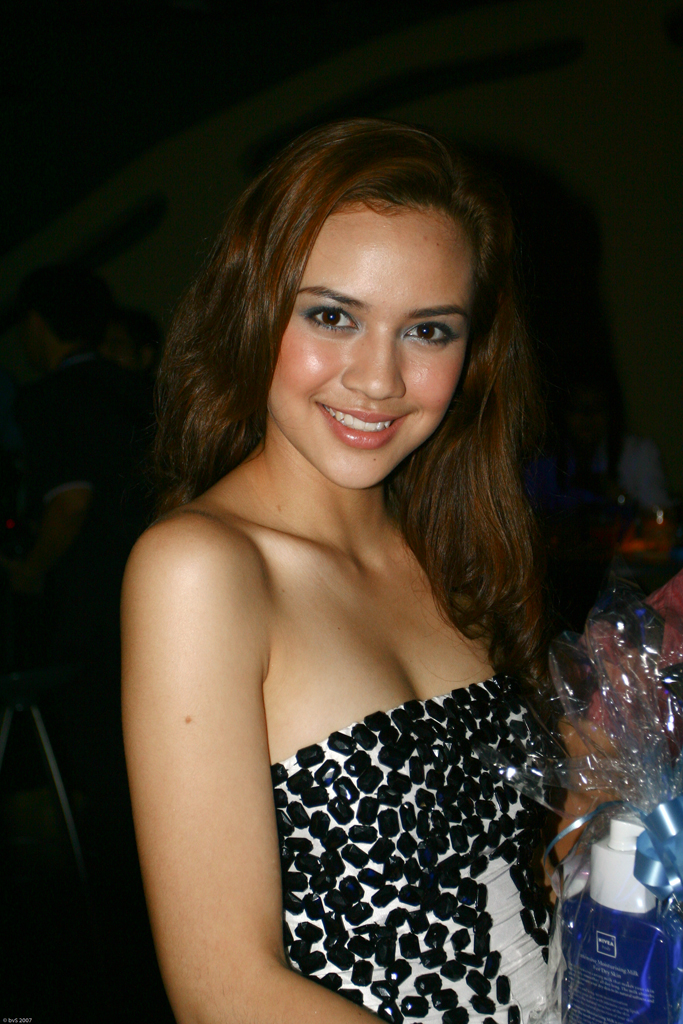
Diana Danielle, Jury Member

=== Semi-final and Final Selection Jury ===
The Semi-Final and Final Selection Jury comprises industry professionals.

=== Preliminary Selection Committee ===
- Ansell Tan
- Chrishandra Sebastiampillai
- Indrani Kopal
- Jasmine Suraya
- Jordan Chiam
- Kaze Ng
- Kik Fei Jiun
- Rabbani Sujak
- Rosdeen Suboh
- TK Cheng
- Victor Chen
- Vimala Perumal
- Zahir Omar

=== Semi-Final Jury ===
| Jury Name(s) | Semi-Final Committee |
|---|---|
| Al Jafree Md Yusop | ✓ |
| Chacko Vadaketh | ✓ |
| Leslie Ewe | ✓ |
| Rendra Zawawi | ✓ |
| Sangeeta Krishnasamy | ✓ |
| Saville Chan | ✓ |
| Vanidah Imran | ✓ |
| Yasmin Yaacob | ✓ |

=== Final Selection Jury ===
| Jury Name(s) | Jury Member | Jury President |
|---|---|---|
| Asif Kapadia | | ✓ |
| Rima Das | ✓ | |
| Reza Rahadian | ✓ | |
| Jennifer Yu | ✓ | |
| Diana Danielle | ✓ | |

== Official Selection ==
Out of a total of 62 films participating in the Official Selection, the lineup spans 49 countries and 43 languages, featuring 3 world premieres, 4 Asian premieres, 6 Southeast Asian premieres, and 38 local premieres.

=== Opening Film ===
| English title | Original title | Director(s) | Production country |
|---|---|---|---|
| Ninavau | | Bebbra Mailin | Malaysia |

=== Closing Film ===
| English title | Original title | Director(s) | Production country |
|---|---|---|---|
| Transamazonia | | Pia Marais | France, Germany Switzerland Taiwan Brazil |

=== Competition ===
| English title | Original title | Director(s) | Production country |
|---|---|---|---|
| All That's Left of You | | Cherien Dabis | Cyprus/Germany |
| DJ Ahmet | | Georgi M. Unkovski | North Macedonia, Czechia, Serbia, Croatia |
| My Friend An Delie | 我的朋友安德烈 | Zijian Dong | China |
| Paternal Leave | | Alissa Jung | Germany, Italy |
| Red Path | | Lotfi Achour | Tunisia |
| Soft Leaves | | Miwako Van Weyenberg | Belgium |
| To a Land Unknown | | Mahdi Fleifel | United Kingdom, Greece, Saudi Arabia, Qatar |
| Universal Language | | Matthew Rankin | Canada |
| Winter in Sokcho | Hiver à Sokcho | Koya Kamura | France, South Korea |

=== A-Listers ===
| English title | Original title | Director(s) | Production country |
|---|---|---|---|
| La Grande Maison Paris | グランメゾンパリ | Ayuko Tsukahara | Japan |
| What Does That Nature Say to You | 그 자연이 네게 뭐라고 하니 | Hong Sangsoo | South Korea |

=== Malaysian Dispatch ===
| English title | Original title | Director(s) | Production country |
|---|---|---|---|
| Housekeeping | | Zahir Omar | Malaysia |
| Memori | | Abid Hussain | Malaysia |

=== Neon ===
| English title | Original title | Director(s) | Production country |
|---|---|---|---|
| As The River Goes By | 水东游 | Charles Hu | China |
| Family Secrets | | Lee Sang-hoon | South Korea |
| Renoir | Runowâru | Chie Hayakawa | Japan, France, Singapore, Philippines, Indonesia, Qatar |

=== Manifesto ===
| English title | Original title | Director(s) | Production country |
|---|---|---|---|
| From Island to Island | 由島至島 | Lau Kek Huat | Taiwan |
| The Tides Will Decide | | Azim Rizal | Malaysia |

=== Actor in Focus: Reza Rahadian ===
| English title | Original title | Director(s) | Production country |
|---|---|---|---|
| Habibie & Ainun | | Faozan Rizal | Indonesia |
| My Stupid Boss | | Upi Avianto | Indonesia |

=== Master At Work: Raj Kapoor ===
| English title | Original title | Director(s) | Production country |
|---|---|---|---|
| Awaara | | Raj Kapoor | India |
| Bobby | | Raj Kapoor | India |

=== Master At Work: Ti Lung ===
| English title | Original title | Director(s) | Production country |
|---|---|---|---|
| A Better Tomorrow | 英雄本色 | John Woo | Hong Kong |

=== Lenses of India Women Filmmakers ===
| English title | Original title | Director(s) |
|---|---|---|
| Boong | | Lakshmipriya Devi |
| Second Chance | | Subhadra Mahajan |
| Victoria | | Sivaranjini |
| Village Rockstars 2 | | Rima Das |

=== Open Air Cinema ===
| English title | Original title | Director(s) | Production country |
|---|---|---|---|
| Desolasi | | Syafiq Yusof | Malaysia |
| Emerging Composers Initiative 2025 Shorts Showcase | | Leong Xing Tong, Caitin Leticia, Khira Ammar, Kishan Kumar | Malaysia |
| Fly By Night | | Zahir Omar | Malaysia |
| Hantu Kak Limah | | Mamat Khalid | Malaysia |
| Munafik 2 | | Syamsul Yusof | Malaysia |
| Polis Evo | | Ghaz Abu Bakar | Malaysia |
| The Journey | | Chiu Keng Guan | Malaysia |
| The Kid From The Big Apple | | Jess Teong | Malaysia |

=== Harbour of Stories: Hong Kong On Screen ===
| English title | Original title | Director(s) |
|---|---|---|
| Last Song for You | 久別重逢 | Jill Leung |
| Montages of a Modern Motherhood | 虎毒不 | Oliver Chan |
| The Way We Talk | 看我今天怎么说 | Adam Wong |
| Valley of the Shadow of Death | 不赦之罪 | Jeffrey Lam Sen, Antonio Tam |

=== ASEAN On Screen ===
| English title | Original title | Director(s) | Production country |
|---|---|---|---|
| Cu Li Never Cries | Cu Li không bao gio khóc | Pham Ngoc Lan | Vietnam |
| Next Stop, Somewhere | | James Lee | Malaysia |
| Stranger Eyes | 默視錄 | Yeo Siew Hua | Singapore |
| Sunshine | | Antoinette Jadaone | Philippines |
| Tale of the Land | | Loeloe Hendra | Indonesia |
| The Stone | เดอะสโตน พระแท้ คนเก๊ | Arak Amornsupasiri, Vuthipong Sukhanindr | Thailand |

== MIFFest x EUFF (Official Selection） ==
The 25th European Film Festival (EUFF) Malaysia was held in conjunction with the 8th Malaysia International Film Festival (MIFFest) from July 20 to 27, 2025.

| English title | Original title | Director(s) | Production country |
|---|---|---|---|
| Armand | | Halfdan Ullmann Tøndel | Norway/Netherlands/Sweden |
| Drazen | | Danilo Šerbedžija, Ljubo Zdjelarević | Croatia/Slovenia/Serbia |
| Growing Down | | Bálint Dániel Sós | Hungary |
| I Shall See | | Mercedes Stalenhoef | Netherlands |
| Late Shift | | Petra Volpe | Switzerland/Germany |
| Nasty | | Tudor Giurgiu, Christian Pascariu, Tudor D. Popescu | Romania |
| Once Upon a Time in a Forest | | Virpi Suutari | Finland |
| Spilt Milk | | Brian Durnin | Ireland/UK |
| Taste of Freedom | | Oleksandr Berezan | Ukraine |
| The Devil's Bath | | Veronika Franz, Severin Fiala | Austria/Germany |
| The Girl with the Needle | | Magnus von Horn | Denmark/Poland/Sweden |
| The Last Journey | | Filip Hammar and Fredrik Wikingsson | Sweden |
| The Portuguese House | | Avelina Prat | Spain/Portugal |
| The Time It Takes | | Francesca Comencini | Italy/France |
| Year of the Widow | | Veronika Lišková | Czechia/Slovakia/Croatia |

== MGGA 2025 ==
8th Malaysia Golden Global Awards
- Date: July 26, 2025
- Site: Zepp Kuala Lumpur
- Hosted by: (Red Carpet); Dingding (Main Ceremony); Alvin Anthons; Chrystina Ng
- Organized by: Jazzy Group Sdn Bhd

Television coverage
- Network: Delay Broadcast; Unifi TV; VIU Tv; LIVE Broadcast; Facebook Live; YouTube
- Duration: 3 hours
- Ratings: 2.5k (Facebook Live)

The 8th Malaysia Golden Global Awards (MGGA) will take place alongside the 8th Malaysia International Film Festival from July 19–27, 2025 in Kuala Lumpur, celebrating excellence in international and local filmmaking across categories like Best Film, Best Director, and Acting Awards.

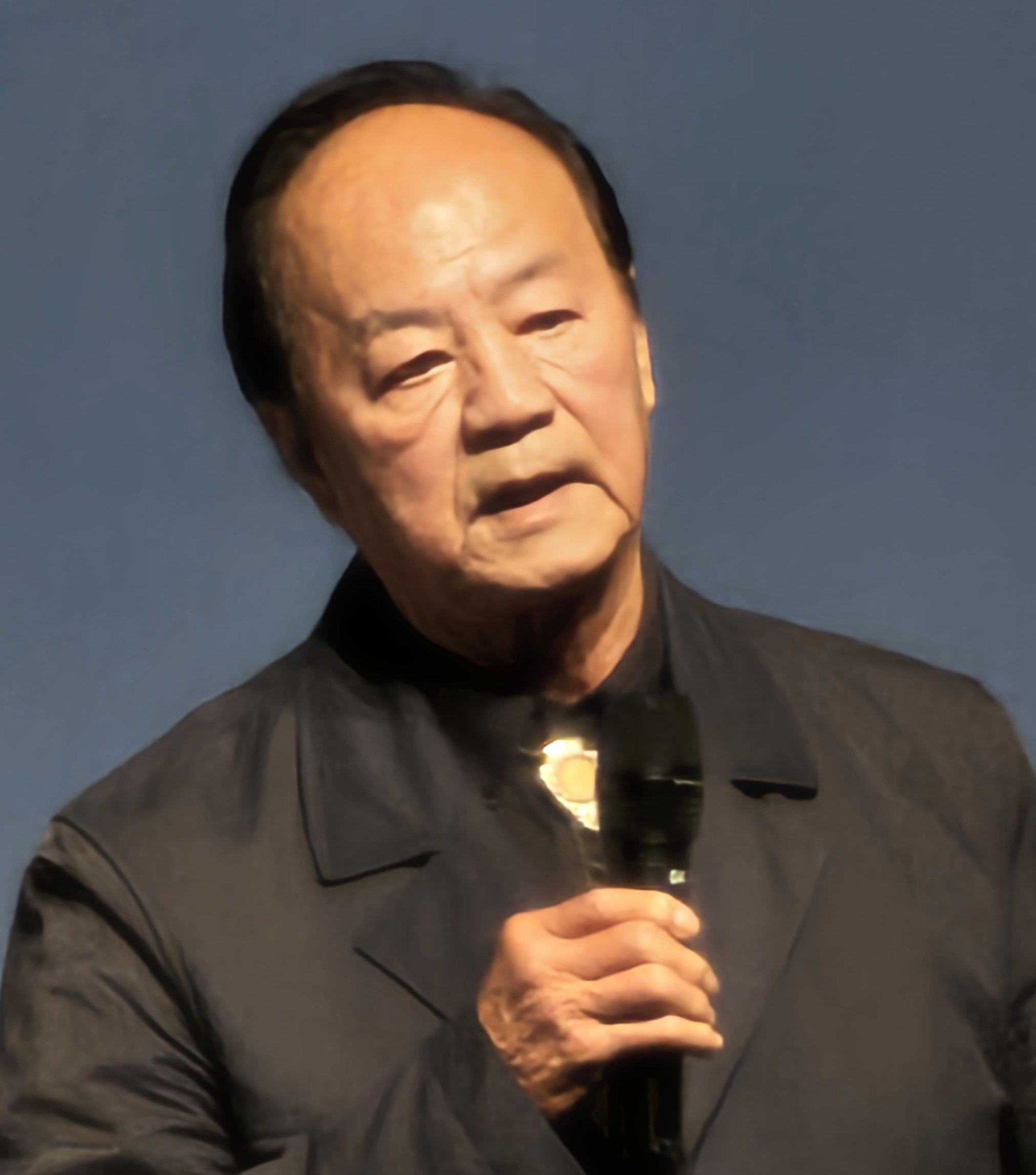
Ti Lung, Lifetime Achievement Award Recipient

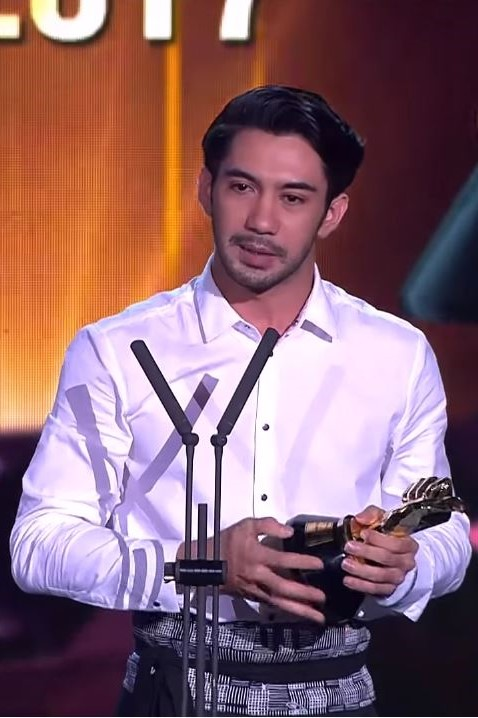
Reza Rahadian, Award for Excellence Achievement in Film Recipient

=== Special awards ===
Hallyu
| Award for Excellence Achievement in Film 卓越电影成就奖 | Reza Rahadian |
| Lifetime Achievement Award 终身成就奖 | Ti Lung (Tommy Tam Fu-wing) 狄龙 (譚富榮) |

=== Winners and nominees ===
Nominees announced on June 12, 2025.

Winners are listed first and highlighted in boldface.

| **Best Film** **All That's Left of You**: DJ Ahmet; My Friend An Delie; Paternal Leave; Red Path; Soft Leaves; To a Land Unknown; Universal Language; Winter in Sokcho | **Best Director** **Lotfi Achour / Red Path**: Cherien Dabis / All That's Left of You; Georgi M. Unkovski / DJ Ahmet; Dong Zijian / My Friend An Delie; Mahdi Fleifel / To a Land Unknown |
| **Best Actor** **Mahmood Bakri / To a Land Unknown**: Saleh Bakri / All That's Left of You; Arif Jakup / DJ Ahmet; Liu Haoran / My Friend An Delie; Ali Helali / Red Path | **Best Actress** **Juli Grabenhenrich / Paternal Leave**: Cherien Dabis / All That's Left of You; Lill Berteloot / Soft Leaves; Rojina Esmaeili / Universal Language; Bella Kim / Winter in Sokcho |
| **Best Supporting Actor** **Han Haolin / My Friend An Delie**: Mohammad Bakri / All That's Left of You; Aksel Mehmet / DJ Ahmet; Chi Xingkai / My Friend An Delie; Aram Sabbagh / To a Land Unknown | **Best Supporting Actress** **Park Mi-Hyeon / Winter in Sokcho**: Maria Zreik / All That's Left of You; Yin Tao / My Friend An Delie; Masako Tomita / Soft Leaves; Danielle Fichaud / Universal Language |
| **Best Screenplay** **Cherien Dabis / All That's Left of You**: Zhang Weizhong, Dong Zijian / My Friend An Delie; Natacha De Pontcharra, Doria Achour, Sylvain Cattenoy, Lotfi Achour / Red Path; Mahdi Fleifel, Fyzal Boulifa, Jason Mccolgan / To a Land Unknown; Koya Kamura, Stéphane Ly-Cuong / Winter In Sokcho | **Best Cinematography** **Isabelle Stachtchenko/ Universal Language**: Christopher Aoun / All That's Left of You; Naum Doksevski / DJ Ahmet; Lyu Songye / My Friend An Delie; Wojciech Staroń / Red Path |
**Audience Choice Award** **From Island To Island - Lau Kek Huat**
**New Hope Award** **Red Path - Lotfi Achour**: Soft Leaves - Miwako Van Weyenberg; Universal Language - Matthew Rankin; Paternal Leave - Alissa Jung; DJ. Ahmet - Georgi M. Unkovski; To a Land Unknown - Mahdi Flefel; My Friend An Delie - Dong Zijian; All That's Left of You - Cherien Dabis

== Presenters and performers ==
The following individuals, listed in order of appearance, presented awards or performed musical numbers:

Presenters
| Name(s) | Role |
|---|---|
| Colin | Served as announcer for the 8th Golden Global Awards |
| Bront Palarae; Daiyan Trisha | Gave an opening monologue for the 8th Golden Global Awards |
| Yang Hormat Dato'. Gerald Hans Isaac; Chairman of FINAS, National Film Development Corporation Malaysia | Presenter of New Hope Award |
| Lee Dongha; Lee Sang-hoon | Presenter of Best Cinematography |
| Garin Nugroho | Presenter of Best Screenplay |
| Liu Yi Hao; Xiong Ziqi | Presenter of Best Supporting Actress |
| Ji Seung-hyun; Lim Ming Chen | Presenter of Best Supporting Actor |
| Abhilash Chandra; Mimi Lana; Syafiq Kyle | Presenter of Audience Choice Award |
| Daiyan Trisha | Presenter of Excellence Achievement in Film Award |
| Zizan Razak; Diana Danielle | Presenter of Best Actress |
| Jennifer Yu; Truong Ngoc Anh | Presenter of Best Actor |
| Kim Dong Ho (Honorary Chairman of MIFFest and MGGA); Joanne Goh (Founder of MIFFest and MGGA) | Presenter of Life Achievement Award |
| Reza Rahadian; Rima Das | Presenter of Best Director |
| Asif Kapadia | Presenter of Best Film |

Performers
| Name(s) | Role |
|---|---|
| Yuka Kharisma | Performed "I Have Nothing" by Whitney Houston and Bahasa Kalbu by Raisa/Andi Rianto |
| ALYPH | Performed "Ingat" |

== See also ==
- 2025 Cannes Film Festival
- 61st Golden Horse Awards
- Hong Kong Film Award
- Star Awards 2025
- 97th Academy Awards
