= Paternal Leave =

2025 German-Italian film

- Festival release poster
- Directed by: Alissa Jung
- Written by: Alissa Jung
- Produced by: Michael Weber; Cécile Tollu-Polonowski; Viola Fügen
- Starring: Juli Grabenhenrich; Luca Marinelli; Arturo Gabbriellini; Joy Falletti Cardillo; Gaia Rinaldi
- Cinematography: Carolina Stone Crusher
- Edited by: Heike Parplies; David Maria Vogel
- Production companies: Match Factory Productions; Wildside
- Distributed by: Vision Distribution; The Match Factory GmbH
- Release dates: 15 February 2025 (Berlinale); 15 May 2025 (Italy)
- Running time: 113 minutes
- Countries: Germany; Italy
- Languages: German; Italian; English

Paternal Leave is a 2025 drama film directed by Alissa Jung in her feature film directorial debut. The film follows 15-year-old Leo as she journeys to the northern coast of Italy to meet her estranged biological father for the first time.

A Germany and Italy co-production, the film was selected in the Generation 14plus section at the 75th Berlin International Film Festival, where it had its world premiere on 15 February 2025.

== Cast ==
- Juli Grabenhenrich as Leo, daughter
- Luca Marinelli as Father
- Arturo Gabbriellini
- Joy Falletti Cardillo
- Gaia Rinaldi
- Gabriele Carà

== Production ==
The film is produced by Michael Weber, Cécile Tollu-Polonowski and Viola Fügen, under banners of Match Factory Productions GmbH, Cologne, and Wildside, Rome. Celluloid Tracks took over the post-production of the sound. The project received support from the Kuratorium Junger Deutscher Film and the Film Commission of the Emilia-Romagna Region, among others.

Principal photography began on 9 February 2024 on locations in Germany, and Italy. Filming ended on 22 March 2024 Italy, Emilia-Romagna.

On 9 February, filming was underway in Germany and Italy. In late March filming was done in Dessau-Roßlau, Saxony-Anhalt Germany, where, among other things, the train station served as a backdrop. The film was also shot in Cesena, in the Po Delta Park, between Ravenna, Marina Romea, Casalborsetti and Cervia in the province of Ravenna, Comacchio and Argenta, Emilia–Romagna in the province of Ferrara and Munich.

== Release ==
Paternal Leave had its World premiere on 15 February 2025, as part of the 75th Berlin International Film Festival, in Generation 14plus. It will also compete at the 8th Malaysia International Film Festival in competition section and screened on 20 July 2025. Distributed by Vision Distribution, it was released theatrically in Italy on 15 May 2025.

== Accolades ==
Award	Date	Category	Recipient	Result	Ref.
Berlin International Film Festival	23 February 2025	Crystal Bear for the Best Film	Alissa Jung	Nominated	
Berlin International Film Festival	23 February 2025	Prize AG Kino – Gilde - Cinema Vision 14plus	Paternal Leave	Won	
8th Malaysia International Film Festival	26 July 2025	Best Film	Alissa Jung	Nominated	
8th Malaysia International Film Festival	26 July 2025	Best Actress	Juli Grabenhenrich	Won	
