= Romuald Grabczewski =

Polish chess player (1932–2005)

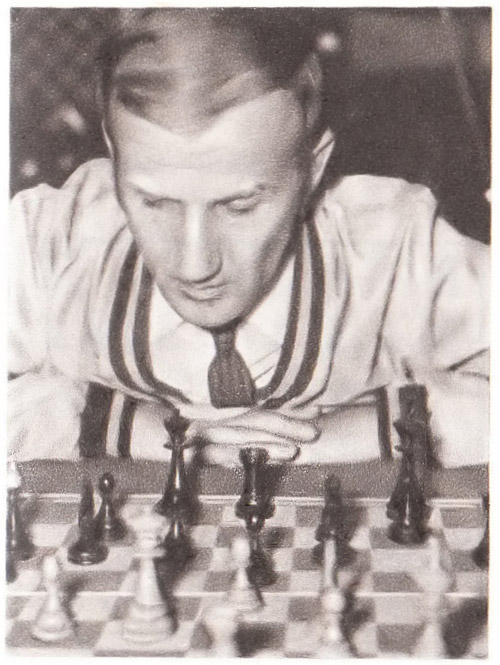

Personal information
- Born: February 7, 1932 Warsaw, Poland
- Died: 20 August 2005 (aged 73) Warsaw, Poland

Chess career
- Country: Poland
- Title: International Master (1972)
- Peak rating: 2425 (May 1974)

Romuald Grabczewski (7 February 1932 – 20 August 2005) was a Polish chess player who won the Polish Chess Championship in 1968. He received the FIDE title of International Master (IM) in 1972.

== Chess career ==
In 1950 Grabczewski won bronze medal in Polish Junior Chess Championship. From 1953 to 1977 Grabczewski played sixteen times in the Polish Chess Championship's finals, and in 1968 he won tournament in Łódź. In 1966 he won silver medal in first Polish Fast Chess Championship. Grabczewski was a multiple medalist in Polish Team Chess Championship, including nine gold medals. Grabczewski took part in more than twenty international tournaments. He won tournament in Eksjö (1974), stayed in third place in Warsaw (1961), Lublin (1971), Marina Romea (1978), and stayed in fourth place in Dubna (1971).

Romuald Grabczewski played for Poland in Chess Olympiads:

- In 1968, at second reserve board in the 18th Chess Olympiad in Lugano (+2, =4, -1).
