= Helena Zengel =

German actress (born 2008)

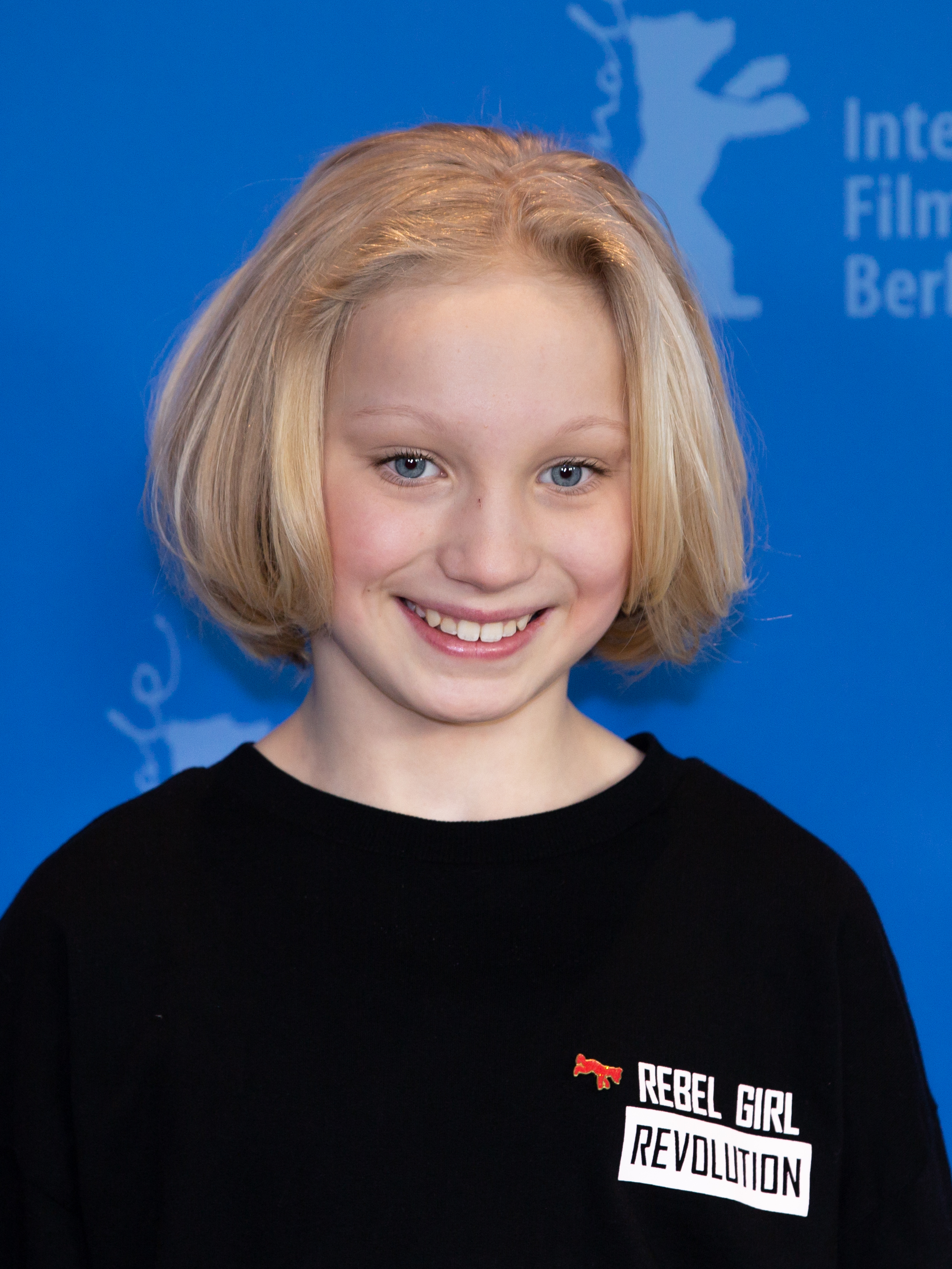
- Zengel at the 2019 Berlin International Film Festival
- Born: 10 June 2008 (age 17); Berlin, Germany
- Occupation: Actor
- Years active: 2013–present
- Website: helenazengel.com

Helena Zengel (German: [ˈhɛlena ˈtsɛŋl̩]; born 10 June 2008) is a German actress. She is best known for her roles in the films System Crasher (2019), News of the World (2020), Transamazonia (2024), and The Legend of Ochi (2025).

== Early life ==
Zengel was born and raised in Berlin, Germany, and began her acting career at the age of five in a music video for the Berlin Alternative rock band Abby.

== Career ==
Her first main role in a film, at the age of eight, was in a drama film, Die Tochter (The Daughter AKA Dark Blue Girl), which was shown at the Berlinale 2017. She also had small parts in two episodes of a German TV series, Die Spezialisten – Im Namen der Opfer.

In the drama film System Crasher, written and directed by Nora Fingscheidt, which premiered in February 2019 at the Berlinale, Zengel plays the leading role of "Benni", an aggressive and traumatised nine-year old. In April 2020 she won the German Film Prize for Best Actress.

After System Crasher won a number of international awards, Zengel was cast by Universal Pictures to play a leading role in the American Western film News of the World directed by the British film director Paul Greengrass, which was her first international film. In this adaptation of the 2016 novel of the same name by Canadian-American writer Paulette Jiles, which starred Tom Hanks as Captain Jefferson Kidd, Zengel stars as a 10-year-old German orphan named Johanna Leonberger who was raised by the Kiowa; most of her performance is in the Kiowa language For her performance, Zengel received nominations for a Golden Globe Award and Screen Actors Guild Award for Best Actress in a Supporting Role. Zengel also dubbed herself in the Italian, German, French and Spanish versions; the dubbing is limited to the lines she spoke in English.

In 2021, Zengel appeared as Nina Cutter in A Christmas Number One alongside Freida Pinto and Iwan Rheon, a heartfelt romantic comedy about a young woman trying to save her uncle from himself before she succumbs to a terminal illness. The film was directed by Chris Cottam and written by Robert Chandler, Keiron Self and Giles New, and features performances by the fictitious artists, 5 Together, Scurve and Ranelle Spear.

In 2024, Zengel played a leading role in the international film production Transamazonia directed by Pia Marais. She plays the role of Rebecca, the daughter of an American missionary in the Amazon rainforest, who claims that his daughter is a faith healer.

In 2025, Zengel starred in the A24 fantasy adventure film The Legend of Ochi acting opposite of Finn Wolfhard, Emily Watson, and Willem Dafoe.

== Filmography ==
=== Film ===
Year	Title	Role	Notes
2014	Spreewaldkrimi: Mörderische Hitze	Johanna	TV film
2016	Looping	Lilly	
2017	Dark Blue Girl	Luca	
2019	System Crasher	Bernadette "Benni" Klaaß	
2020	News of the World	Johanna Leonberger	
2021	A Christmas Number One	Nina Cutter	
2024	Transamazonia	Rebecca	
2025	The Legend of Ochi	Yuri	

=== Television ===
Year	Title	Role	Notes
2016	Die Spezialisten – Im Namen der Opfer	Anja Rothmann	Episode: "Flowerpower"
2017	Die Spezialisten – Im Namen der Opfer	Lily Weyer	Episode: "Sommermärchen"
2017	Der gute Bulle	Fabienne	Television film
2019	Inga Lindström: Familienfest in Sommerby	Mila	Television film

=== Music video ===
Year	Title	Artist
2013	Streets	Abby
2022	Ich hasse es hier	Tocotronic

== Awards and nominations ==
Year	Award	Category	Work	Result	Ref
2020	Chicago Film Critics Association	Most Promising Performer	News of the World	Nominated	
2021	Alliance of Women Film Journalists	Best Women's Breakthrough Performance	News of the World	Nominated	
2021	Austin Film Critics Association	Best Supporting Actress	News of the World	Nominated	
2021	Critics' Choice Movie Awards	Best Young Performer	News of the World	Nominated	
2021	Dallas–Fort Worth Film Critics Association	Best Supporting Actress	News of the World	3rd place	
2021	Georgia Film Critics Association	Breakthrough Award	News of the World	Nominated	
2021	Golden Globe Awards	Best Supporting Actress in a Motion Picture	News of the World	Nominated	
2021	Hawaii Film Critics Society	Best Supporting Actress	News of the World	Nominated	
2021	Online Film and Television Association	Best Youth Performance	News of the World	Runner-up	
2021	Phoenix Critics Circle	Best Supporting Actress	News of the World	Nominated	
2021	Phoenix Film Critics Society	Best Performance by a Youth	News of the World	Won	
2021	Satellite Awards	Best Supporting Actress in a Motion Picture	News of the World	Nominated	
2021	Screen Actors Guild Awards	Outstanding Actress in a Supporting Role	News of the World	Nominated	
2021	Seattle Film Critics Society	Best Youth Performance	News of the World	Nominated	
2021	Washington D.C. Area Film Critics Association	Best Youth Performance	News of the World	Nominated	
