= Lamone (river) =

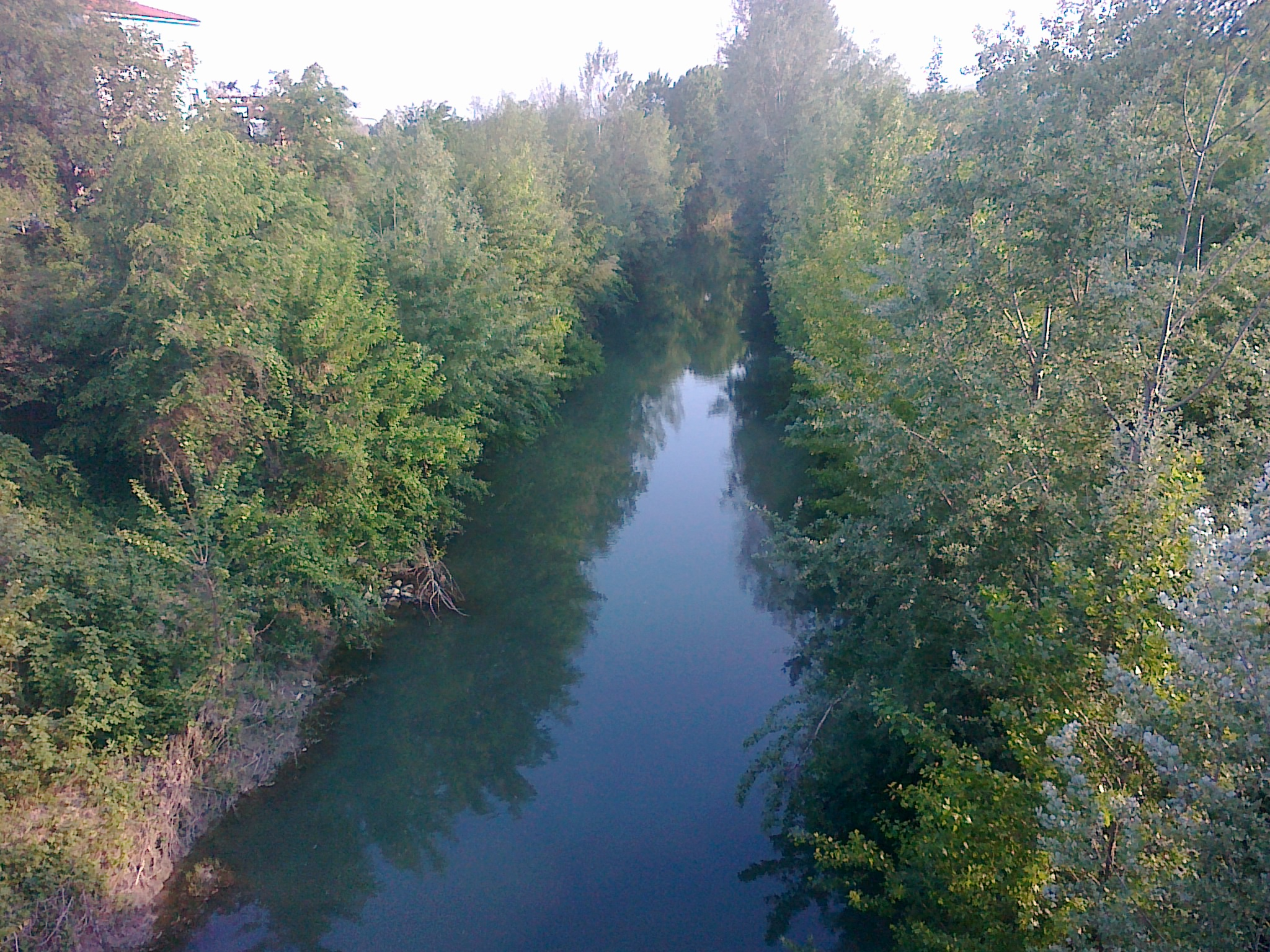

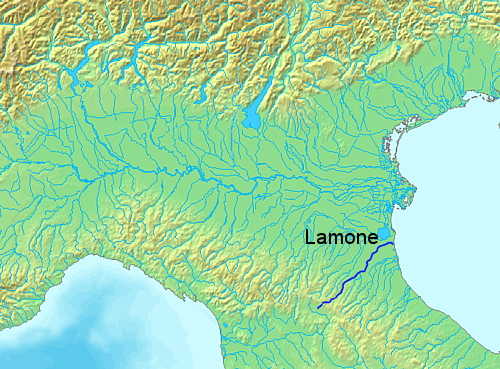

Location
- Country: Italy

Physical characteristics
- Source
  - location: Appennino Tosco-Emiliano mountains in the Province of Florence
  - elevation: 1,100 m (3,600 ft)
- Mouth: Adriatic Sea
  - coordinates: 44.5271°N 12.2797°E
- Length: 88 km (55 mi)
- Basin size: 500 km^{2} (190 sq mi)

The Lamone is a river in the Tuscany and Emilia-Romagna regions of Italy. The source of the river is in the Appennino Tosco-Emiliano mountains in the province of Florence. The river flows northeast near Marradi before crossing the border into the province of Ravenna. It continues flowing northeast near Brisighella, Faenza, Russi and Bagnacavallo before curving eastward north of Ravenna and entering the Adriatic Sea near Marina Romea and Marina di Ravenna.
