= 63rd Berlin International Film Festival =

2013 film festival in Berlin, Germany

63rd Berlin Film Festival
- Festival poster
- Opening film: The Grandmaster
- Closing film: Child's Pose
- Location: Berlin, Germany
- Founded: 1951
- Awards: Golden Bear: Child's Pose
- Hosted by: Anke Engelke
- No. of films: 404 films
- Festival date: 7–17 February 2013
- Website: Website

Berlin International Film Festival chronology
- 64th 62nd

The 63rd annual Berlin International Film Festival took place in Berlin, Germany, between 7 and 17 February 2013. Chinese film director Wong Kar-wai was announced as the president of the jury and his film The Grandmaster was the opening film of the festival.

The Golden Bear was awarded to Child's Pose directed by Călin Peter Netzer, which also served as the closing film.

The French documentary filmmaker Claude Lanzmann was awarded with the Honorary Golden Bear. Italian actress Isabella Rossellini and German film director Rosa von Praunheim were awarded with the Berlinale Camera.

== Juries ==
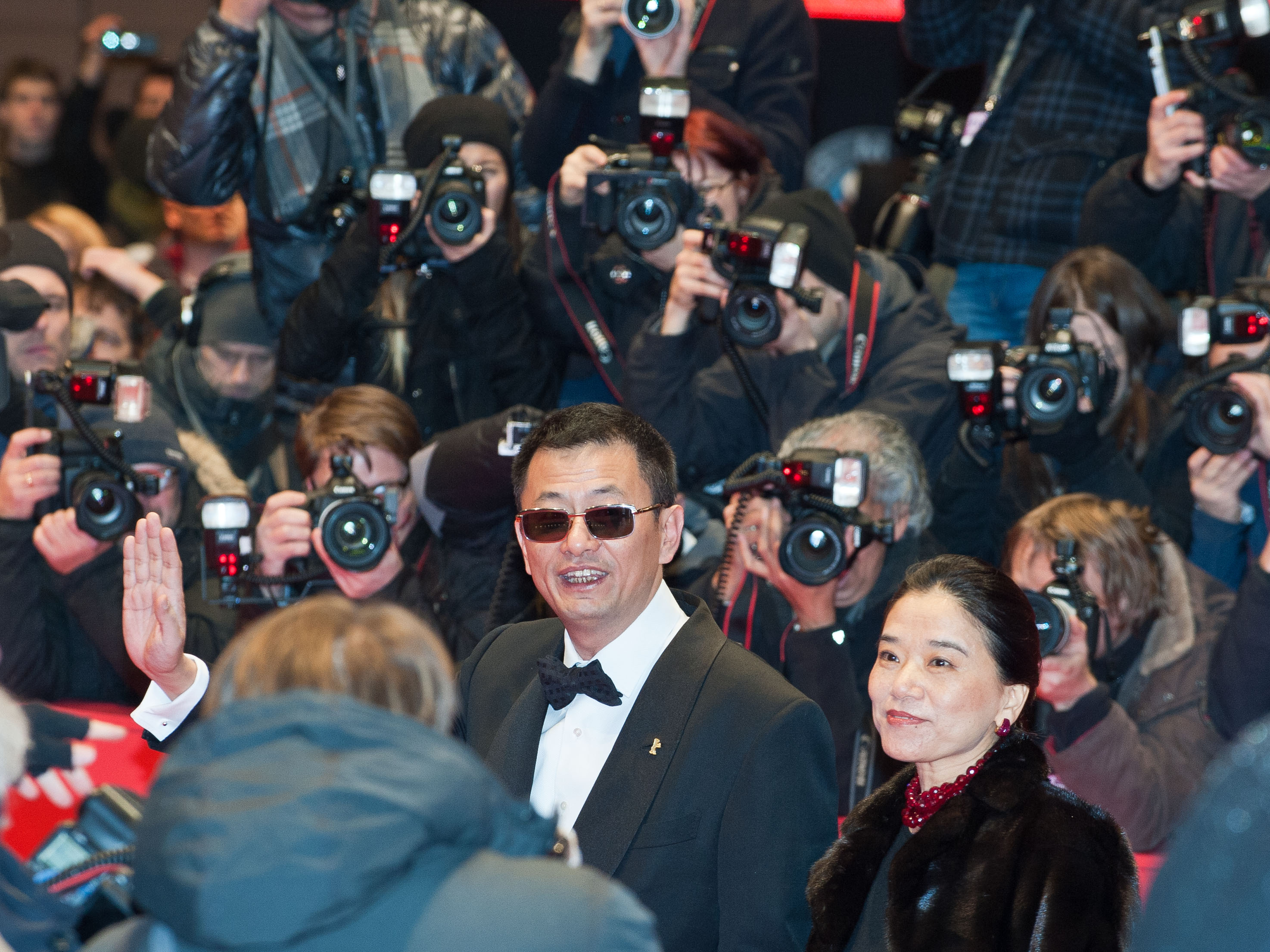
Wong Kar-wai, jury president, along with his wife at the festival

The following people were on the jury for the festival:

=== Main Competition ===
- Wong Kar-wai, Chinese/Hong Kong filmmaker and producer - President of the jury
- Susanne Bier, Danish filmmaker
- Andreas Dresen, German filmmaker
- Ellen Kuras, American filmmaker and director of photography
- Shirin Neshat, Iranian visual artist and filmmaker
- Tim Robbins, American actor, filmmaker and producer
- Athina Rachel Tsangari, Greek filmmaker and producer

=== First Feature Award ===
- Oren Moverman, Israeli filmmaker and producer
- Taika Waititi, New Zealand actor and filmmaker
- Lucy Walker, British filmmaker

=== Short Films Competition ===
- Javier Fesser, Spanish filmmaker
- Hyung-sook Hong, South Korean filmmaker
- Susanne Pfeffer, German art historian and curator

== Official Sections ==
=== Main Competition ===
The following films were selected for the main competition for the Golden Bear and Silver Bear awards:

English title	Original title	Director(s)	Production country
A Long and Happy Life	Долгая счастливая жизнь	Boris Khlebnikov	Russia
An Episode in the Life of an Iron Picker	Epizoda u životu berača željeza	Danis Tanović	Bosnia and Herzegovina, France, Slovenia
Camille Claudel 1915		Bruno Dumont	France
Child's Pose	Poziția Copilului	Călin Peter Netzer	Romania
Closed Curtain	پرده	Jafar Panahi, Kambuzia Partovi	Iran
Gloria		Sebastián Lelio	Chile, Spain
Gold		Thomas Arslan	Germany
Harmony Lessons	Асланның сабақтары	Emir Baigazin	Kazakhstan, Germany
In the Name Of	W imię...	Małgorzata Szumowska	Poland
Layla Fourie		Pia Marais	Germany, South Africa, France, Netherlands
Nobody's Daughter Haewon	누구의 딸도 아닌 해원	Hong Sang-soo	South Korea
On My Way	Elle s'en va	Emmanuelle Bercot	France
Paradise: Hope	Paradies: Hoffnung	Ulrich Seidl	Austria, France, Germany
Prince Avalanche		David Gordon Green	United States
Promised Land		Gus Van Sant	United States
Charlie Countryman	The Necessary Death of Charlie Countryman	Fredrik Bond	United States, Romania
The Nun	La Religieuse	Guillaume Nicloux	France, Germany, Belgium
Side Effects		Steven Soderbergh	United States
Vic and Flo Saw a Bear	Vic et Flo ont vu un ours	Denis Côté	Canada

=== Berlinale Special Gala ===
The following films were selected to be screened out of competition:

English title	Original title	Director(s)	Production country
Before Midnight		Richard Linklater	United States, Greece
The Croods		Chris Sanders and Kirk DeMicco	United States
Dark Blood		George Sluizer	Netherlands
The Grandmaster (opening film)	一代宗師	Wong Kar-wai	Hong Kong, China
Night Train to Lisbon		Bille August	Germany, Switzerland, Portugal

=== Panorama ===
The following films were selected for the Panorama section:

English title	Original title	Director(s)	Production country
The Act of Killing	Jagal	Joshua Oppenheimer	Denmark, United Kingdom, Norway
A Fold in My Blanket	Chemi Sabnis Naketsi	Zaza Rusadze	Georgia
Behind the Camera	Dduit-dam-hwa: Gam-dok-i-mi-cheot-eo-yo	E J-yong	South Korea
Belated	Deshora	Barbara Sarasola-Day	Argentina, Columbia, Norway
The Broken Circle Breakdown	Alabama Monroe	Felix van Groeningen	Belgium
Don Jon's Addiction		Joseph Gordon-Levitt	United States
Fatal	Kashi-ggot	Lee Don-ku	South Korea
Frances Ha		Noah Baumbach	United States
Habi, the Foreigner	Habi, la extranjera	Maria Florencia Alvarez	Argentina, Brazil
Inch'Allah		Anaïs Barbeau-Lavalette	Canada
Kai Po Che!		Abhishek Kapoor	India
Lovelace		Rob Epstein, Jeffrey Friedman	United States
Rock the Casbah	רוק בקסבה	Yariv Horowitz	Israel
My Sisters	Meine Schwestern	Lars Kraume	Germany
So Much Water	Tanta Agua	Ana Guevara Pose, Leticia Jorge Romero	Uruguay, Mexico, Netherlands, Germany
Something in the Way		Teddy Soeriaatmadja	Indonesia
The Swimming Pool	La Piscina	Carlos Machado Quintela	Cuba, Venezuela
White Night	Baek Ya	Hee-il LeeSong	South Korea

=== Forum ===
The following films were selected for the Forum section:

English title	Original title	Director(s)	Production country
The 727 Days Without Karamo	Die 727 Tage ohne Karamo	Anja Salomonowitz	Austria
A Single Shot		David M. Rosenthal	United States, United Kingdom, Canada
The Battle of Tabatô	A batalha de Tabatô	João Viana	Guinea-Bissau, Portugal
Boundary	Fahtum pandinsoong	Nontawat Numbenchapol	Thailand, Cambodia, France
Char... The No-Man's Island	...Moddhikhane Char	Sourav Sarangi	India, Japan, Italy, Denmark, Norway
Circles	Кругови	Srdan Golubović	Republic of Serbia, Germany, Croatia, Slovenia, France
Cold Bloom	Sakura namiki no mankai no shita ni	Atsushi Funahashi	Japan
Coming Forth by Day	Al-khoroug lel-nahar	Hala Lotfy	Egypt, United Arab Emirates
Computer Chess		Andrew Bujalski	United States
Cousin Jules	Le cousin Jules	Dominique Benicheti	France
Crossroads of Youth	Cheongchun-eui sipjaro	Ahn Jong-hwa	Korea
Dark Matter	Materia oscura	Massimo D'Anolfi, Martina Parenti	Italy
The Daughter	Η Κόρη	Thanos Anastopoulos	Greece, Italy
Echolot		Athanasios Karanikolas	Germany
Elelwani		Ntshavheni Wa Luruli	South Africa
Engagement Ring	Konyaku yubiwa	Keisuke Kinoshita	Japan
The Eternal Return of Antonis Paraskevas	Η αιώνια επιστροφή του Αντώνη Παρασκευά	Elina Psykou	Greece
Everyday Objects	Halbschatten	Nicolas Wackerbarth	Germany, France
Forgetting to Know You	忘了去懂你	Quan Ling	China
Fynbos		Harry Patramanis	South Africa, Greece
Hélio Oiticica		Cesar Oiticica Filho	Brazil
I'm Not Dead	Je ne suis pas mort	Mehdi Ben Attia	France
In Bloom	გრძელი ნათელი დღეები	Nana Ekvtimishvili, Simon Groß	Georgia
I Used to Be Darker		Matt Porterfield	United States
Jubilation Street	Kanko no machi	Keisuke Kinoshita	Japan
Killing Strangers	Matar extraños	Jacob Secher Schulsinger, Nicolás Pereda	Mexico, Denmark
The Meteor	Le météore	François Delisle	Canada
No Man's Land	Terra de ninguém	Salomé Lamas	Portugal
La Paz	La Paz	Santiago Loza	Argentina
The Plague	La plaga	Neus Ballús	Spain
Portrait of Jason		Shirley Clarke	United States
Powerless	Katiyabaaz	Fahad Mustafa, Deepti Kakkar	India
Roots	Senzo ni naru	Kaoru Ikeya	Japan
Shirley: Visions of Reality		Gustav Deutsch	Austria
Sieniawka		Marcin Malaszczak	Germany, Poland
Stemple Pass		James Benning	United States
The Strange Little Cat	Das merkwürdige Kätzchen	Ramon Zürcher	Germany
Together	Tian mi mi	Hsu Chao-jen	Taiwan
To the Wolf	Sto lyko	Christina Koutsospyrou, Aran Hughes	Greece, France
The Town of Whales	Kujira no machi	Keiko Tsuruoka	Japan
Viola		Matías Piñeiro	Argentina
What Happened to This City?	Kya hua is shahar ko?	Deepa Dhanraj	India
The Weight of Elephants	Das Gewicht der Elefanten	Daniel Joseph Borgman	New Zealand, Denmark, Sweden
When I Saw You	لما شفتك	Annemarie Jacir	Palestinian Territories, Jordan, United Arab Emirates, Greece
Woman	Onna	Keisuke Kinoshita	Japan
A Legend or Was It? (1963)	死闘の伝説	Keisuke Kinoshita	Japan
A Stranger	Obrana i zastita	Bobo Jelcic	Croatia, Bosnia and Herzegovina, Croatia
Farewell to Dream (1956)	夕やけ雲	Keisuke Kinoshita	Japan
Father's Garden: The Love of My Parents	Vaters Garten – Die Liebe meiner Eltern	Peter Liechti	Switzerland
For Marx...	Za Marksa...	Svetlana Baskova	Russian

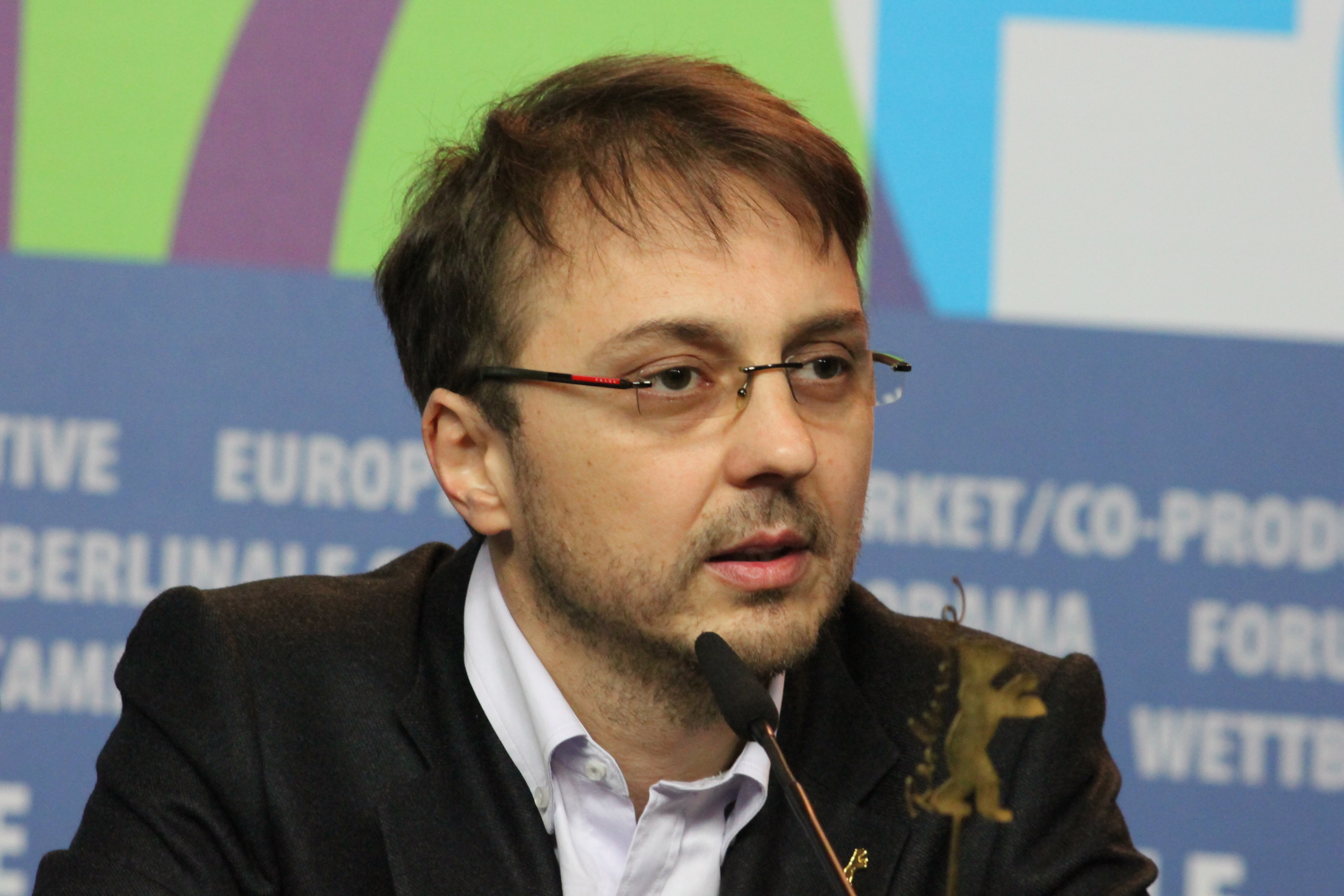
Călin Peter Netzer (Romania), winner of the Golden Bear at the festival

== Official Awards ==
- Golden Bear: Child's Pose by Călin Peter Netzer
- Silver Bear Grand Jury Prize: An Episode in the Life of an Iron Picker by Danis Tanović
- Alfred Bauer Prize: Vic and Flo Saw a Bear by Denis Côté
- Silver Bear for Best Director: David Gordon Green for Prince Avalanche
- Silver Bear for Best Actress: Paulina García for Gloria
- Silver Bear for Best Actor: Nazif Mujić for An Episode in the Life of an Iron Picker
- Silver Bear for Best Screenplay: Jafar Panahi for Closed Curtain
- Silver Bear for Outstanding Artistic Contribution: Aziz Zhambakiyev for Harmony Lessons
- Special Mentions:
  - Promised Land by Gus Van Sant
  - Layla Fourie by Pia Marais

== Independent awards ==
=== Ecumenical Jury Prize ===
- The Act of Killing by Joshua Oppenheimer (Panorama)
- Circles by Srdan Golubović (Forum)

=== FIPRESCI Jury Prize ===
- Hélio Oiticica by Cesar Oiticica Filho

=== Panorama Audience Award ===
- The Act of Killing by Joshua Oppenheimer

=== Forum ===
- NETPAC Award Best Asian Film: When I Saw You by Annemarie Jacir
- C.I.C.A.E. Jury Prize: In Bloom by Nana Ekvtimishvili, Simon Groß
