= To a Land Unknown =

- Release poster
- Directed by: Mahdi Fleifel
- Screenplay by: Mahdi Fleifel; Fyzal Boulifa; Jason McColgan
- Produced by: Geoff Arbourne; Mahdi Fleifel; Maria Drandaki; Layla Meijman; Maarten van der Ven; François Morisset
- Starring: Mahmood Bakri; Aram Sabbagh; Angeliki Papoulia; Mohammad Alsurafa; Mouataz Alshaltouh; Mohammad Ghassan; Mondher Rayahneh
- Cinematography: Thodoris Mihopoulos
- Edited by: Halim Sabbagh
- Music by: Nadah El Shazly
- Production companies: Inside Out Films; Nakba FilmWorks; Salaud Morisset; Homemade Films; Studio Ruba
- Release date: May 22, 2024 (Cannes)
- Running time: 106 minutes
- Countries: United Kingdom; France; Germany; Netherlands; Greece; Qatar; Saudi Arabia; Palestine
- Languages: Arabic; English; Greek

To a Land Unknown is a 2024 drama film, directed and co-written by Mahdi Fleifel. It stars Mahmood Bakri and Aram Sabbah as Chatila and Reda, Palestinian refugees living in Athens who are trying to save what little money they can acquire to purchase fake passports so they can move to Germany, only for Chatila to become drawn into a high-risk smuggling plot after Reda spends all their money on heroin.

The film had its world premiere at the Directors' Fortnight section of the 2024 Cannes Film Festival.

== Cast ==
- Mahmood Bakri as Chatila
- Aram Sabbah as Reda
- Angeliki Papoulia as Tatiana
- Mohammad Alsurafa as Malik
- Mondher Rayahneh as Marwan
- Manal Awad
- Mohammad Ghassan
- Mouataz Alshaltouh

== Distribution ==
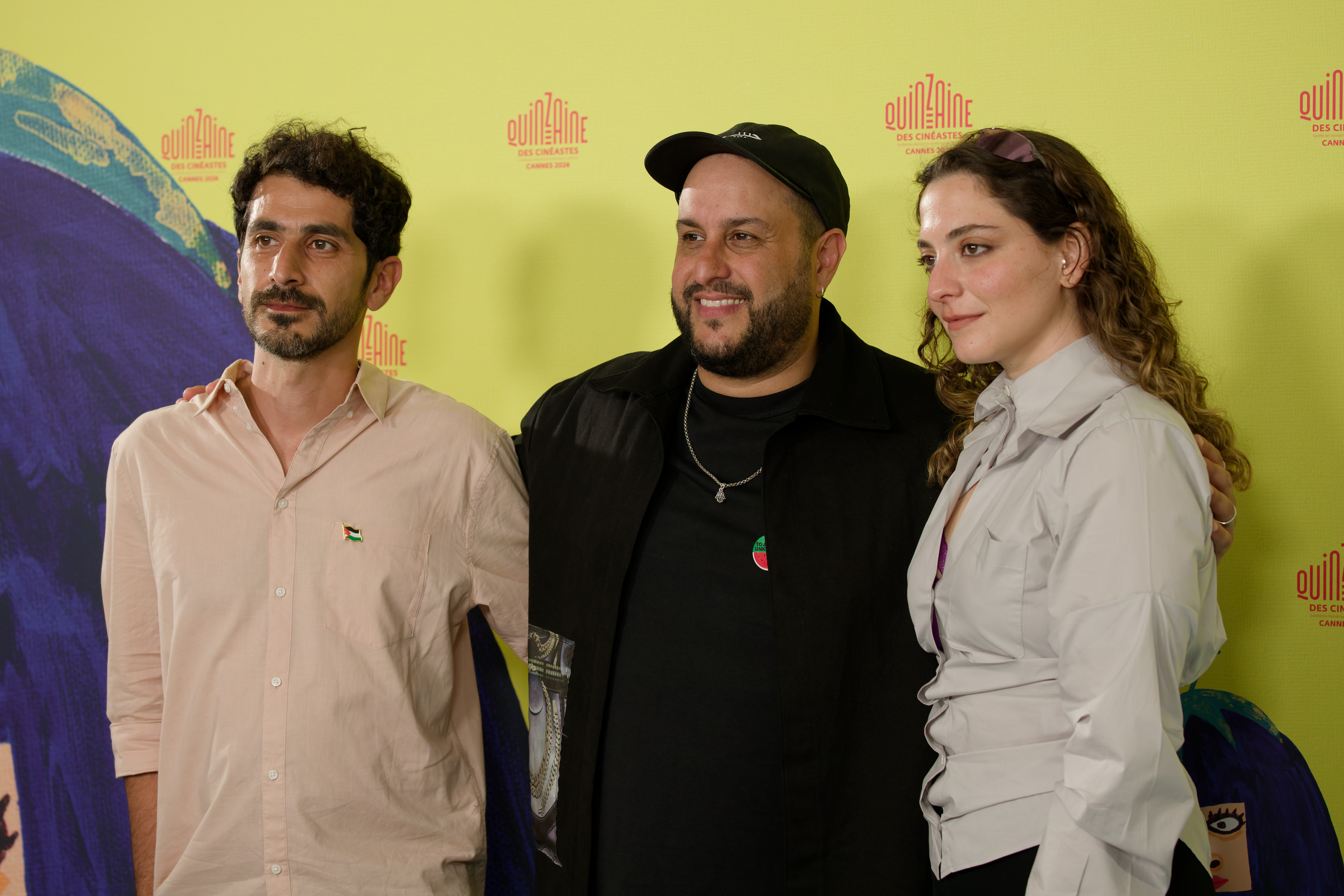
Halim Sabbagh, Mahdi Fleifel, and Nadah El Shazly at the film's premiere at the 2024 Cannes Film Festival

The film premiered in the Director's Fortnight program at the 2024 Cannes Film Festival, and had its North American premiere at the 2024 Toronto International Film Festival.

It has been acquired for commercial distribution by Watermelon Pictures in North America.
