= Fly by Night (film) =

2018 Malaysian crime thriller film

- Directed by: Zahir Omar
- Written by: Dain Said; Ivan Yeo; Zahir Omar; Frederick Bailey
- Produced by: Farouk Aljoffery; Perin Petrus; Joanne Goh
- Starring: Sunny Pang; Eric Chen; Fabian Loo; Jack Tan; Frederick Lee; Bront Palarae; Joyce Harn
- Cinematography: Keong Low
- Edited by: Yin-Chau Heng
- Music by: Zane
- Production company: Planet Films
- Release dates: 7 October 2018 (Busan IFF); 11 April 2019 (Malaysia)
- Running time: 100 minutes
- Country: Malaysia
- Languages: Mandarin; Cantonese; Malay

Fly by Night (Chinese: 非常盗, Malay: Sebelum Pagi Berakhir) is a 2018 Malaysian Mandarin-language neo-noir crime thriller film. The film follows four taxi drivers who extort money from wealthy passengers. Things go wrong when one of them works with a victim, while an inspector and the criminal gang are in pursuit of them.

It received positive reviews. It was released on 11 April 2019 in Malaysia, Singapore and Brunei.

== Synopsis ==
In Kuala Lumpur, four taxi drivers run a low-profile extortion team by targeting passengers that they drive from the airport. They keep the scheme small, only blackmailing selected wealthy passengers. Among the drivers are two brothers, Tai Lo (Sunny Pang) and Sai Lo (Fabian Loo) who commit these crimes in order to pay off their debts. Things go wrong when the impulsive younger brother decides to work with one of their victims to blackmail her lover, while policeman Inspector Kamal and the criminal gang, hot on their heels are in pursuit of them. How far will they go?

== Cast ==
- Sunny Pang as Tai Lo, older brother
- Eric Chen as Ah Soon
- Fabian Loo as Sai Lo, younger brother
- Jack Tan as Gwai Lo
- Frederick Lee as Jared
- Bront Palarae as Inspector Kamal
- Joyce Harn
- Ruby Yap aka Ruby Faye as Michelle
- Shaun Chen
- Mike Chuah
- Pearlly Chua
- John Tan
- Ken Abdullah
- Sarah Lian
- Iedil Putra
- Sabrena Khalid
- Joko Anwar as Alan

== Release ==
The film is the theatrical director debut for Zahir Omar. The film had its world premiere at the 23rd Busan International Film Festival in October 2018. It was then screened at the 3rd International Film Festival and Awards Macao (IFFAM) and 2018 Jogja-NETPAC Asian Film Festival. In early 2019, it was selected to be screened at the 2019 New York Asian Film Festival and Santa Barbara International Film Festival. It received positive reviews.
