= Alissa Jung =

German actress and singer

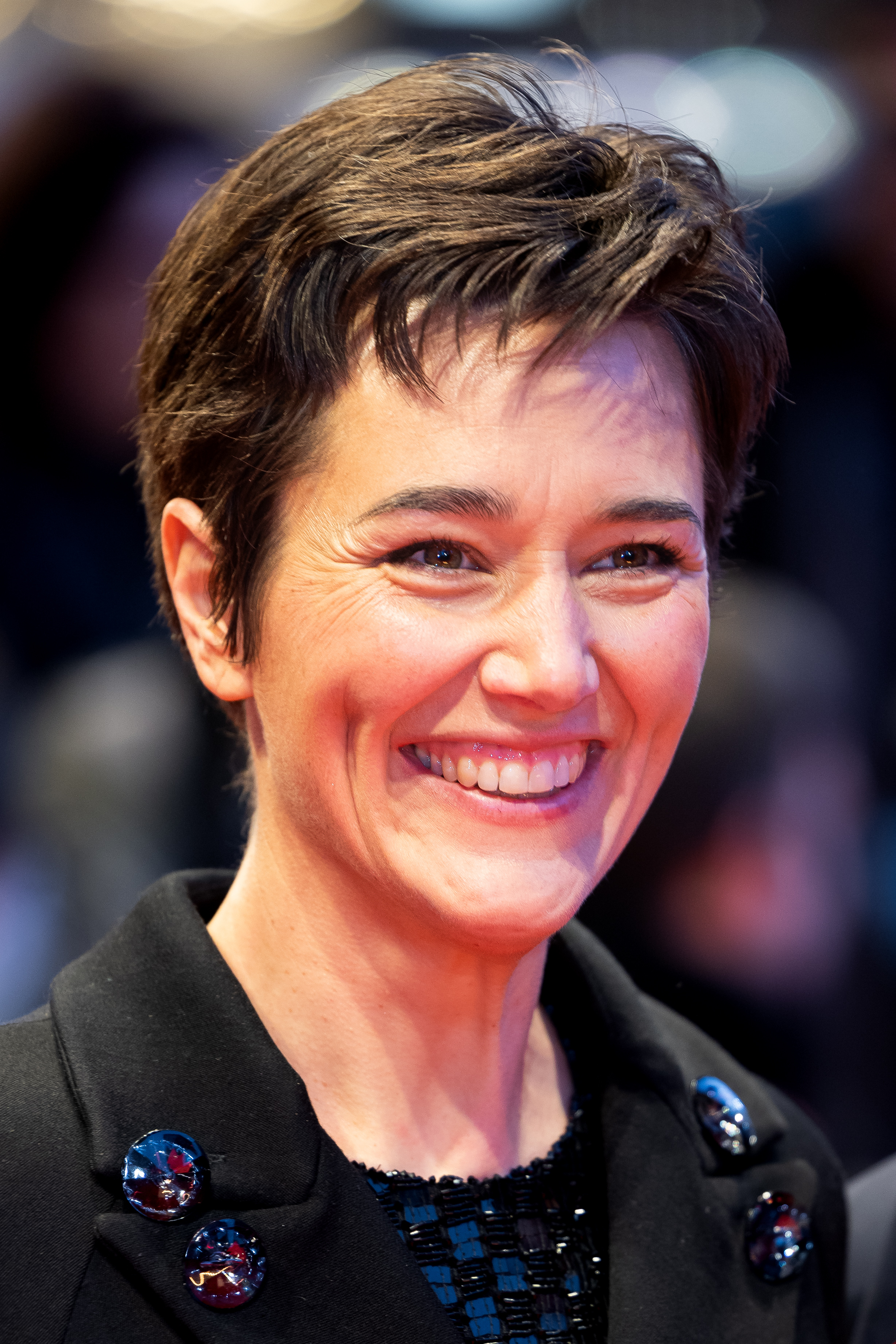
- Born: 30 June 1981 (age 45); Münster, North Rhine-Westphalia, West Germany (now Germany)
- Occupations: actress; physician
- Spouse: Luca Marinelli
- Partner: Jan Hahn (199?-2006)
- Children: 2
- Relatives: Burkhard Jung (father)
- Website: alissajung.de

Alissa Jung (born 30 June 1981) is a German actress and physician.

== Early life ==
Alissa Jung was born in Münster to Juliane Kirchner and Burkhard Jung (SPD), the Lord Mayor of Leipzig (Saxony) since 2006. She is the eldest of four sisters, and has a paternal half-sister.

== Career ==
From 1992 to 1999 she was a member of the listening play for children's radio ensemble of MDR and worked as a voice actor, dubbing and synchronizing various children's films and series. In 1996, she began to perform in plays (among others, in Theaterhaus Schille as the titular character in Antigone and in Schauspiel Leipzig in Jeff Noon's Yellow). At the age of 16, she was discovered during a theatrical performance and in 1998 she took her first film role in the ARD series In aller Freundschaft. Since then, she has appeared in many film and television productions.

She played the lead role of Nelly Heldmann in the 2006 Sat.1 telenovela Schmetterlinge im Bauch, the fairy tale adaptation Des Kaisers neue Kleider, and the Sat.1 film Im Brautkleid meiner Schwester. She portrayed the titular character, Mary of Nazareth, in the 2012 television film Ihr Name war Maria, and had lead roles in the movies Zweisitzrakete (2013) and Open my Eyes (2016).

In 2019, Jung starred in the critically acclaimed television program Das kleine Fernsehspiel, and the film Das Menschenmögliche.

Jung plays the role of Lucy in Hideo Kojima's 2025 video game Death Stranding 2: On the Beach, her first video game role, alongside her husband Luca, who also stars in the title.

== Personal life ==
Jung lived with her partner, television presenter Jan Hahn, and their children Lenius (born 1999) and Julina (born 2004) in Berlin, until their relationship ended in autumn 2006.

Luca Marinelli and Jung at the 83rd Venice International Film Festival

She resides in Berlin with her husband, actor Luca Marinelli. They met on the set of Mary of Nazareth.

In 2017, she received her doctorate of medicine. Her dissertation was titled Zinc deficiency is associated with depressive symptoms: Results from the Berlin Aging-Study II.

=== Philanthropy ===
Jung initiated the "Schools for Haiti" campaign in 2008, which she has chaired since 2011 as chairwoman of the "Pen Paper Peace" association. The association is committed to education in Central America and Europe. Among other things, it finances two schools in Port-au-Prince, Haiti and, through educational projects, aims to heighten the global sense of responsibility among young people in Germany and Italy.

== Filmography ==
- 1998–2005: In aller Freundschaft (63 episodes)
- 2000: Küss mich, Frosch (TV film)
- 2001: Besuch aus Bangkok (TV film)
- 2002–2003: Körner und Köter (9 episodes)
- 2003: Cologne P.D. – Blutige Beichte
- 2004: Leipzig Homicide – Sein letztes Date
- 2004: Hallo Robbie! – Flaschenpost
- 2004: Die Wache – Schein und Sein
- 2005: Die Rettungsflieger – Trennung
- 2006: Der erste Engel
- 2006–2007: Schmetterlinge im Bauch (123 episodes)
- 2007: Suddenly Gina (TV film)
- 2007: Stolberg – Der Sonnenkönig
- 2007: SOKO Wismar – Spitzenleistung
- 2008: Im Tal der wilden Rosen – Fluss der Liebe
- 2008: Inga Lindström – Hochzeit in Hardingsholm
- 2008: Griechische Küsse (TV film)
- 2008: Alarm für Cobra 11 – Die Autobahnpolizei – Leben und leben lassen
- 2009: Küstenwache – Grausame Täuschung
- 2010: Cologne P.D. – Entführt
- 2010: Tatort – Der Polizistinnenmörder
- 2010: Schafe zählen
- 2010: Rosamunde Pilcher – Wenn das Herz zerbricht
- 2010: Des Kaisers neue Kleider (TV film)
- 2011: Im Brautkleid meiner Schwester (TV film)
- 2012: Mary of Nazareth (2 parts)
- 2012: Open my Eyes
- 2012: Zweisitzrakete
- 2013: Heiter bis tödlich: Morden im Norden – Auf Herz und Nieren
- 2014: Die Familiendetektivin – Brüderchen und Schwesterchen
- 2014: Alarm für Cobra 11 – Die Autobahnpolizei – Lackschäden
- 2014: Die Bergretter – Gefangen im Eis
- 2015: Bettys Diagnose – Fieber
- 2015: SOKO München – Die Kinder der Agathe S.
- 2015: Einfach Rosa – Die Hochzeitsplanerin (TV series)
- 2016: Inga Lindström – Gretas Hochzeit
- 2019: Das Menschenmögliche (TV film)
- 2022: Der Überfall (TV miniseries)
- 2025: Paternal Leave, Selected in the Generation 14plus section at the 75th Berlin International Film Festival, where it will have its world premiere in February 2025.
- 2025: Death Stranding 2: On the Beach as Lucy (Video game)
