= List of awards and nominations received by Siti Saleha =

Wikimedia list article

Siti Saleha is a Malaysian actress who has received recognition for her performances in television and film, earning awards from several Malaysian and international award ceremonies.

In 2024, Saleha won the Outstanding Asian Star (Malaysia) award at the Seoul International Drama Awards for her portrayal of Sam in the Tonton Original series SeOfis. The award recognised her outstanding performance and marked an international recognition of her acting talent. She was among seven recipients of the Outstanding Asian Star award representing different Asian countries.

Earlier in her career, Saleha received the Best Actress award at the 2018 Anugerah Telenovela for her performance in the television production Mandatori. In 2019, she won Best Supporting Actress in a Film at the 23rd Anugerah Skrin for her role in 7ujuh.

At the Anugerah Bintang Popular Berita Harian (ABPBH), Saleha has won the Popular Female TV Actress award three times. Her victories in 2020 and 2021 were achieved consecutively through her portrayal of Mia Adriana in the television drama 7 Hari Mencintaiku. She had previously won the same category at ABPBH 27. She also received the Popular Female Film Actress award at ABPBH 27 and ABPBH 28.

At the eighth edition of the Anugerah Telenovela in 2023, Saleha received the Popular Telenovela Actress award for 2020 and was named Ratu Telenovela. She attributed the recognition partly to the popularity of the first and second seasons of 7 Hari Mencintaiku, in which she portrayed Mia Adriana.

In addition to her acting awards, Saleha received the Malaysia Model Star Award at the 15th Asia Model Festival in 2020, held in South Korea.

== Awards and nominations ==
=== Seoul International Drama Awards ===
Year	Category	Work	Result
2024	Outstanding Asian Star (Malaysia)	SeOfis	Won

=== Anugerah Bintang Popular Berita Harian ===
Year	Category	Work / Associated person	Result
2012	Popular Female TV Actress	Siti Saleha	Nominated
2013	Popular Female TV Actress	Siti Saleha	Won
2013	Popular Female Film Actress	Siti Saleha	Won
2013	Best On-Screen Chemistry (with Zizan Razak)	KL Zombi	Nominated
2015	Popular Female TV Actress	Siti Saleha	Nominated
2015	Popular Female Film Actress	Siti Saleha	Won
2016	Popular Female Film Actress	Siti Saleha	Nominated
2016	Popular Female TV Actress	Siti Saleha	Nominated
2017	Popular Female TV Actress	Siti Saleha	Nominated
2017	Popular Female Film Actress	Siti Saleha	Nominated
2017	Best Drama Couple (with Shukri Yahaya)	7 Hari Mencintaiku	Nominated
2020	Popular Female TV Actress	Siti Saleha	Won
2021	Popular Female TV Actress	Siti Saleha	Won
2021	Best Drama Couple (with Shukri Yahaya)	7 Hari Mencintaiku 2	Nominated
2024	Popular TV Actress	Siti Saleha	Nominated
2025	Popular TV Actress	Siti Saleha	Nominated

=== Anugerah Skrin ===
Year	Category	Work	Result
2011	Pantene Promising Artist Award	Sudu & Garfu	Nominated
2015	Best Actress in a Drama	Ada Sejadah Panjang Terbentang	Nominated
2019	Best Supporting Actress in a Film	7ujuh	Won

=== Kuala Lumpur Drama Festival Awards ===
Year	Category	Work / Associated person	Result
2013	Favourite Actress	Ruby	Nominated
2013	Favourite Cast	Ruby	Nominated
2013	Favourite Couple (with Sharnaaz Ahmad)	Ruby	Nominated
2017	Favourite Actress	7 Hari Mencintaiku	Nominated
2017	Favourite Couple (with Shukri Yahaya)	7 Hari Mencintaiku	Won

=== Melodi Awards ===
Year	Category	Result
2013	Favourite Female Artist	Nominated
2015	Favourite Female Artist	Nominated

=== EH! Style Awards ===
Year	Category	Recipient	Result
2014	Sexiest Female Celebrity	Siti Saleha	Nominated
2017	Sexiest Female Celebrity	Siti Saleha	Nominated

=== MeleTOP Era Awards ===
Year	Category	Work	Result
2014	MeleTOP Film Star	KL Zombi	Nominated

=== Malaysian Film Festival ===
Year	Category	Work	Result
2014	Best Promising Actress	Kerat 14	Nominated

=== Telenovela Awards ===
Year	Category	Work / Associated person	Result
2018	Best Telenovela Actress	Mandatori	Won
2023	Popular Telenovela Actress	7 Hari Mencintaiku 2	Won
2023	Popular On-Screen Couple (with Shukri Yahaya)	7 Hari Mencintaiku 2	Nominated
2023	Telenovela Queen	—	Won

=== Drama Sangat Awards ===
Year	Category	Work / Associated person	Result
2021	Best Actress	—	Nominated
2021	Best Drama Couple (with Shukri Yahaya)	—	Won
2023	Best Actress	7 Hari Mencintaiku 3	Nominated
2023	Best Drama Couple (with Shukri Yahaya)	7 Hari Mencintaiku 3	Nominated

=== Asia Model Festival ===
Year	Category	Result
2020	Malaysia Model Star Award	Won

=== Melodi Terhangat Awards ===
Year	Category	Result
2025	Hottest Celebrity Icon Award	Won
