= Siti Saleha =

Malaysian actress and model (born 1990)

- سيتي صالحة
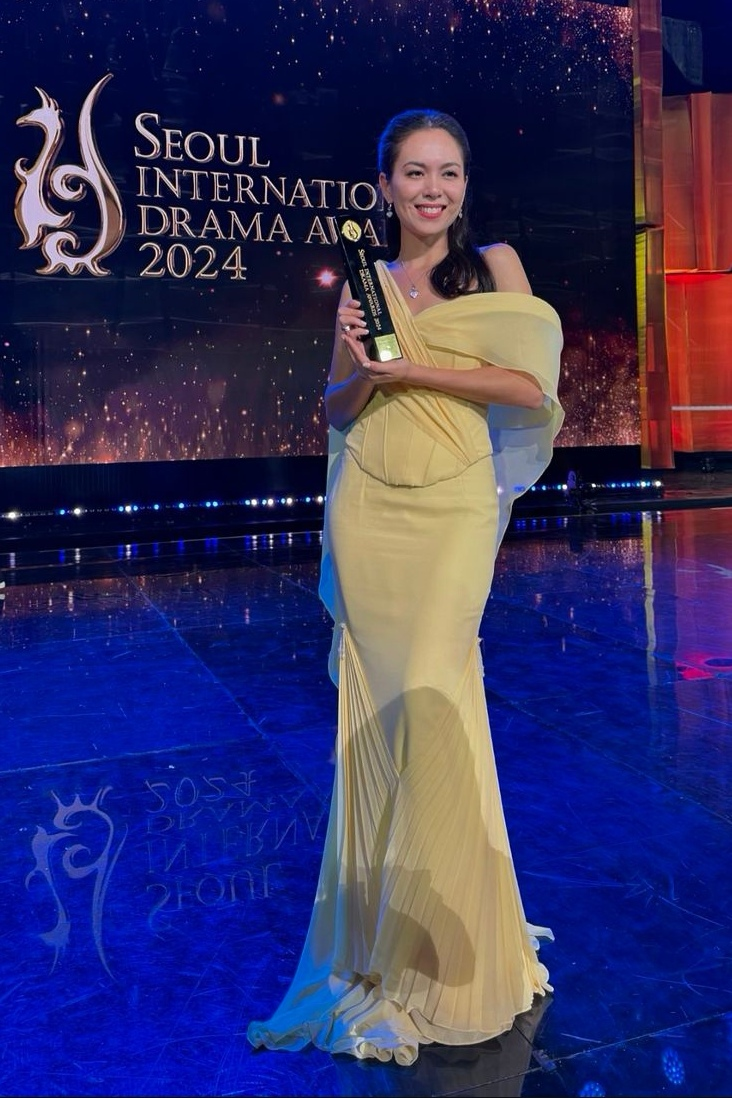
- Saleha at the Seoul International Drama Awards in 2024
- Born: Siti Saleha binti Mohd Baharum; 14 March 1990 (age 36); Basildon, England
- Citizenship: Malaysia
- Occupations: Actress; model; host
- Years active: 2002–present
- Spouse(s): Ahmad Lutfi Azhar (m. 2017; div. 2022) Joshua Fitton (m. 2025)
- Relatives: Sam Bunkface (brother)
- Awards: See More

Siti Saleha binti Mohd Baharum (born 14 March 1990) is a Malaysian actress and model.

== Early life ==
Siti Saleha was born to an English mother, Tracey Johnson, also known as Aishah Rahman and a Malay father, Mohd Baharum Abdul Rahman. She is the third child of four raised in Klang, Selangor. She is the younger sister of Bunkface vocalist, Sam Bunkface.

== Career ==
Siti rose to fame playing the titular role of Nora Elena in the eponymous TV3 drama.

In 2025, Siti was appointed as the brand ambassadors of 8th Malaysia International Film Festival held from 19 to 27 July 2025.

== Personal life ==
Saleha announced her engagement to civil servant Lutfi Azhar, at a private ceremony at her family's residence in Klang on 26 November 2016. On 28 July 2017, Saleha married Ahmad Lutfi Azhar. Their wedding reception was held at TPC Bukit Kiara, Kuala Lumpur. On 17 January 2022, after four years of marriage, the couple divorced. In November 2024, she announced her engagement with Joshua Fitton, a fashion designer.

== Filmography ==
=== Film ===
Year	Title	Role	Notes
2013	Kerat 14	Nurzara	First film
2013	KL Zombi	Nora	
2013	Balada Pencinta	Aisyah	
2014	Mamak Cupcake	Juliana	
2014	Terbaik Dari Langit	Zelda	
2015	Bravo 5	Aida	
2016	Langit Cinta	Suzana	
2017	Aku Bukan Spy aka (Spy In Love)	Yasmin	
2017	Pak Pong	Puteri Serapit	
2018	7ujuh	Tina	
2018	The Spiral	Melanie / Katarina / Alice	
2021	Proksi	Diana	
2022	Rajawali	Maya	
2022	Seratus	Nurse	Cameo appearance

=== Television series ===
Year	Title	Role	Notes
2008	5 Jingga	Zaleha	
2008	Kasut Tumit Tinggi	Farah	
2008	Kapten Boleh		
2009	Kecuali Cintamu	Jaslina	
2009	Kau Laksana Bulan		
2009	Awan Dania (Season 2)		
2010	Di Bawah Ketiak Isteri (Season 2)	Noni	
2010	Syurgamu Ramadhan	Adura	
2010	Habil & Qabil	Maria	
2011	Ustaz Amirul	Munirah	
2011	Nora Elena	Nora Elena	
2011	Mistik Alam Hitam	Princess	Episode: "Bisikan Puteri"
2012	Cinta Alif Ba Ta	Zulaikha	
2012	Terlanjur Cinta	Nia Maizura	
2013	Ruby	Syuhara	
2013	Asmara Luna	Luna	
2013	Memberku Hawa	Nur Hawa	
2014	Aku Ada Wali	Syumaila	
2014	Ramadan Jangan Pergi	Farah	
2014	Manis	Anis	
2015	Ayuni Safira	Ayuni Safira	
2016	Uda & Dara	Siti Mariam	
2016	7 Hari Mencintaiku	Mia Adriana	
2017	Mandatori	Juliana	
2018	Bila Aidil Ada Fitri	Fitri Syafiah	
2018	Jika Masih Ada Rindu	Wahida	
2019–2021	Black (Korean drama adaptation)	Sofia Farid	
2020	Manuskrip Cinta	Dian Aryani	
2020	7 Hari Mencintaiku 2	Mia Adriana	
2021	Scammer	Amy	
2022	Love In Lockdown	Suzanna	
2022	7 Hari Mencintaiku 3	Mia Adriana	
2022	Scammer 2	Amy	Cameo appearance
2022	Hilang	Wangi	

=== Telemovie ===
Year	Title	Role
2009	Puaka Topeng Putih	Laila
2009	Senandung Semalam	
2009	Baju Raya Mona	Netty
2010	Bersalji di Kuala Lumpur	Diana
2011	Gincu	Maria
2011	Sudu & Garfu	Aliya
2011	Cintaku 120 km/j	Asminar
2011	Rebah Di Hujung Taubat	Nisha
2011	Kekasih Awal dan Akhir	Akhirah
2011	Aku Untuk Siapa	Julia
2012	Semadikan Aku	Elly
2012	Izan Azizan	
2012	7 Hari Di Neraka	Mariam
2012	Syawal Aidil Dan Fitri	
2012	Pelita Buluh Tok Wan	
2012	Bila Kerbau Bunting Berkubang	
2012	Aku, Dia dan Tong Sampah	Sharnaz
2012	Bukan Itu Takdirku	
2013	Dari Sinar Mata	Sara
2013	Dari Kerana Mata	
2013	Kisah Sebenar Mengenai Bibah	Bibah
2014	Sekilas Cinta	Izara
2014	Luth Mahfuz	Ema
2014	Mat Gedebe	Cikgu Murni
2014	Hati Untuk Siapa	
2014	Cinta Hati Suri	Suri
2014	Cikgu Gangster	Maria
2014	Ketupat Rendang Keju	Alysa
2015	Aku, Dia dan Tong Gas	Sharnaz
2015	Cintaku Tertinggal Di Mostar	Zulaikha
2015	Tak Nak Balik Raya	Uda
2015	Parut Sarajevo	Naida Beslajic
2015	Ada Sejadah Panjang Terbentang	Siti Aishah
2015	Cinta Paling Agung	Amyza
2016	Maduku Telefon Bimbit	Mastura
2016	Malam Ku Bermimpi	
2017	Kekasih Elektrik	Puspa
2017	Isteri Untuk Abang Long	Dian
2017	Memori Pajeri Nenas	Camelia
2017	Mat So'od	Samsiah
2017	Sekolah Api	
2017	Gadis Kosmos	Puspa
2018	Hamba Iblis	Aishah
2018	Bulan, Bintang & Sayang	Lily/Seri
2018	I Heart You Cik Yah	Badariah
2020	Anais Patah Hati Pertama Kali	Anais
2020	Koboi & Vampire	Budi
2021	Ancak	Hanis

=== Television ===
Year	Title	Role	Notes
2011	Gerbang AIM	Guest	
2013	Projek Gila	Guest	
2022–present	Women Talk	Host	
2022	Muzikal Lawak Superstar (Season 3)	Jury	
2022	Sepahtu Reunion Live	Bella	Episode: "Kau Culik Cintaku"

== Videography ==
Video music appearance
Year	Song title	Artist
2011	"Legasi Cleopatra"	Erul AF9
2012	"Untuk Dia"	Sleeq & Najwa Latif

== Awards and nominations ==
For the complete list of awards and nominations received by Siti Saleha, see List of awards and nominations received by Siti Saleha .
