= Joanne Goh =

Malaysian film producer and business executive

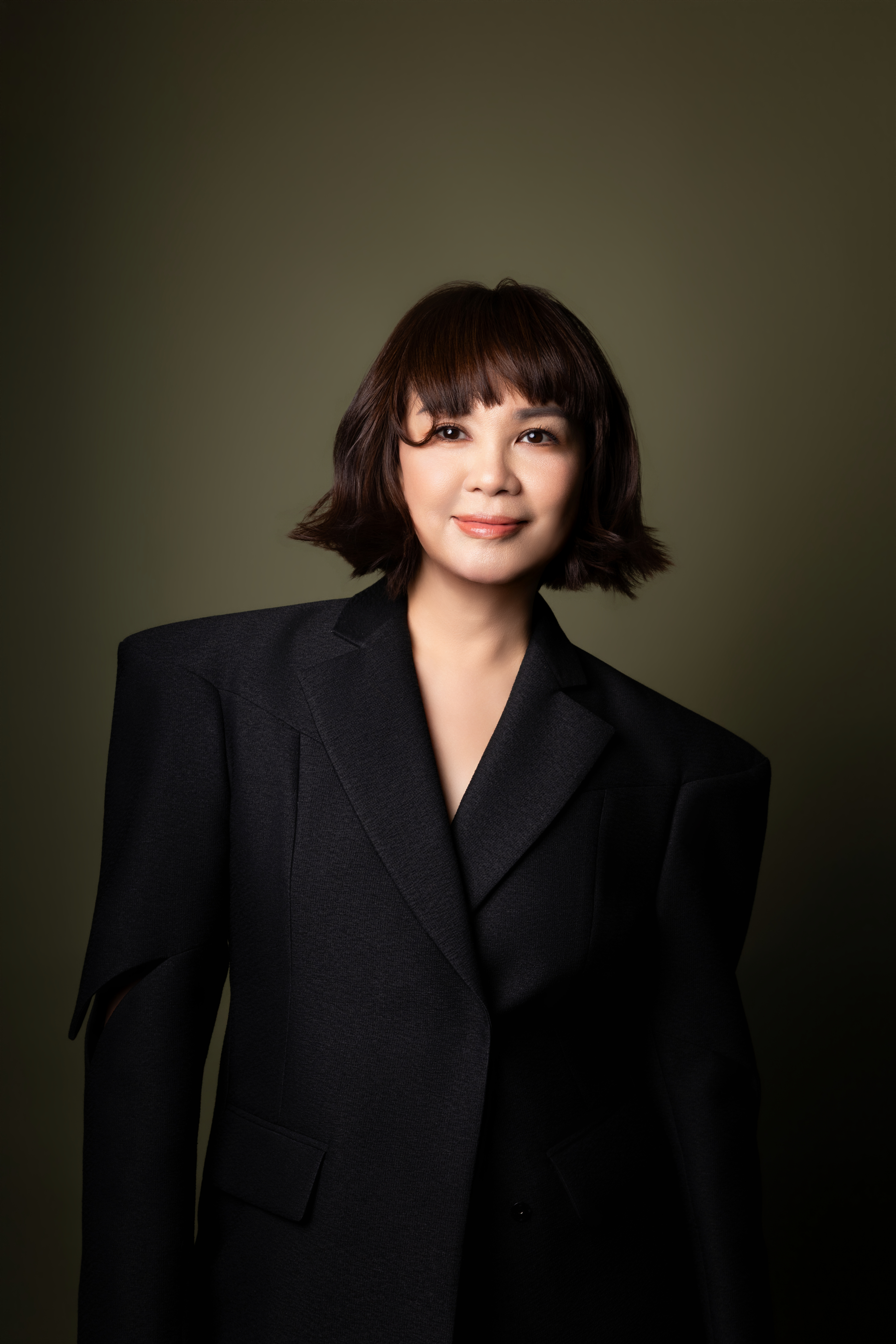
- Born: Malaysia
- Occupations: Film producer Executive producer Entrepreneur
- Years active: 1997–Present

Joanne Goh is a Malaysian film producer and entrepreneur. She started her career in the entertainment industry in 1997. She is the founder of Jazzy Group of Companies, which organizes live concerts; Jazzy Pictures, a film and TV production company based in Malaysia; the Malaysia International Film Festival and the Malaysia Golden Global Awards.

== Career ==
=== Jazzy Pictures ===
In 2017, Joanne Goh founded Jazzy Pictures, a film production and distribution company.

In 2018, along with Pixel Play Entertainment, Goh co-produced Crossroads: One Two Jaga, which won Best Film at the 30th Malaysia Film Festival and other local awards. The film's positive reception paved the way for "a new direction for an industry that comes under close government scrutiny when it comes to subject matter, with its themes of corruption and crime". In the same year, Goh produced Fly By Night, which premiered in the 23rd Busan International Film Festival.

In 2019, Goh produced Nina Wu, a film that was a response to and a reflection of the #MeToo movement. Directed by Taiwanese director Midi Z, the film was selected to compete in the 72nd Cannes Film Festival.

Goh's upcoming projects include Transamazonia and June.

=== MIFFest & MGGA ===
Established in 2016, the Malaysia International Film Festival (MIFFest) and the Malaysia Global Golden Awards (MGGA) aim to showcase curated films from all over the world, and to recognize a collection of works selected by a panel of judges who are veterans of the film industry. In an interview with the New Straits Times, Goh said that "the purpose of both events is to build a communication platform for global filmmakers and to promote the Malaysian film industry, as well as its arts and culture to the world". Through MiFFest and MGGA, Goh also hopes to promote the Malaysian tourism and arts industries. The festival is supported by the National Film Development Corporation (FINAS), Tourism Malaysia and several other local film associations.

=== Fast Forward with Joanne Goh ===
In 2020, Fast Forward with Joanne Goh was published. It was a biography about Goh's twenty-three years of experience in the entertainment industry.

== Producer filmography ==
Year	Film	Director	Notes
2018	Crossroads: One Two Jaga	Nam Ron	Best Film: 20th Malaysia Film Festival Opening Film: 20th Udine Far East Film Festival
2018	Fly By Night	Zahir Omar	Screening: 23rd Busan International Film Festival Screening: Asian Film Festival (2019) Screening: 3rd International Film Festival and Awards Macao (2019)
2019	Nina Wu	Midi Z	Official Selection of UN CERTAIN REGARD - 72nd Cannes International Film Festival Screening: 24th Busan International Film Festival Opening Film: 3rd Malaysia International Film Festival
2019	The Lies I Tell	Bront Palarae	
2020	Takut Ke Tak	Muzzamer Rahman	
2022	The Devil's Deception	Kabir Bhatia	
2022	Warning From Hell	Danny Pang	World Premiere: 26th Bucheon International Fantastic Film Festival 2022
2022	Ijab Kabut	Mohd Faliq Sharif	
2022	Talbis Iblis	Kabir Bhatia	World Premiere: 24th Far East Film Festival 2022
2022	Reborn	Danny Pang	
2023	Budak Flat	Ming Jin Woo Syafiq Yusof Eugene Lim	
2024	Transamazonia	Pia Marais	Official Selection of 77th Locarno Film Festival Official Selection of 62nd New York Film Festival
TBA	June	Yang Wang	
TBA	J3: J Resolution	Areel Abu Bakar	

== Achievements ==
=== Jury ===
- Sinag Maynila Independent Film Festival 2019 (Main Competition)
- Asian World Film Festival 2022

=== Honorary Fellow ===
- Lincoln University College, Malaysia

=== Awardee ===
- Top 50 Active International Woman Leaders 2016
- Malaysia's Top 30 Women of Excellence Awards 2024 by Affin Invikta
- British Publishing House's Successful People in Malaysia and Singapore
- Tatler Asia's Most Influential
