= Burkhard Jung =

German politician

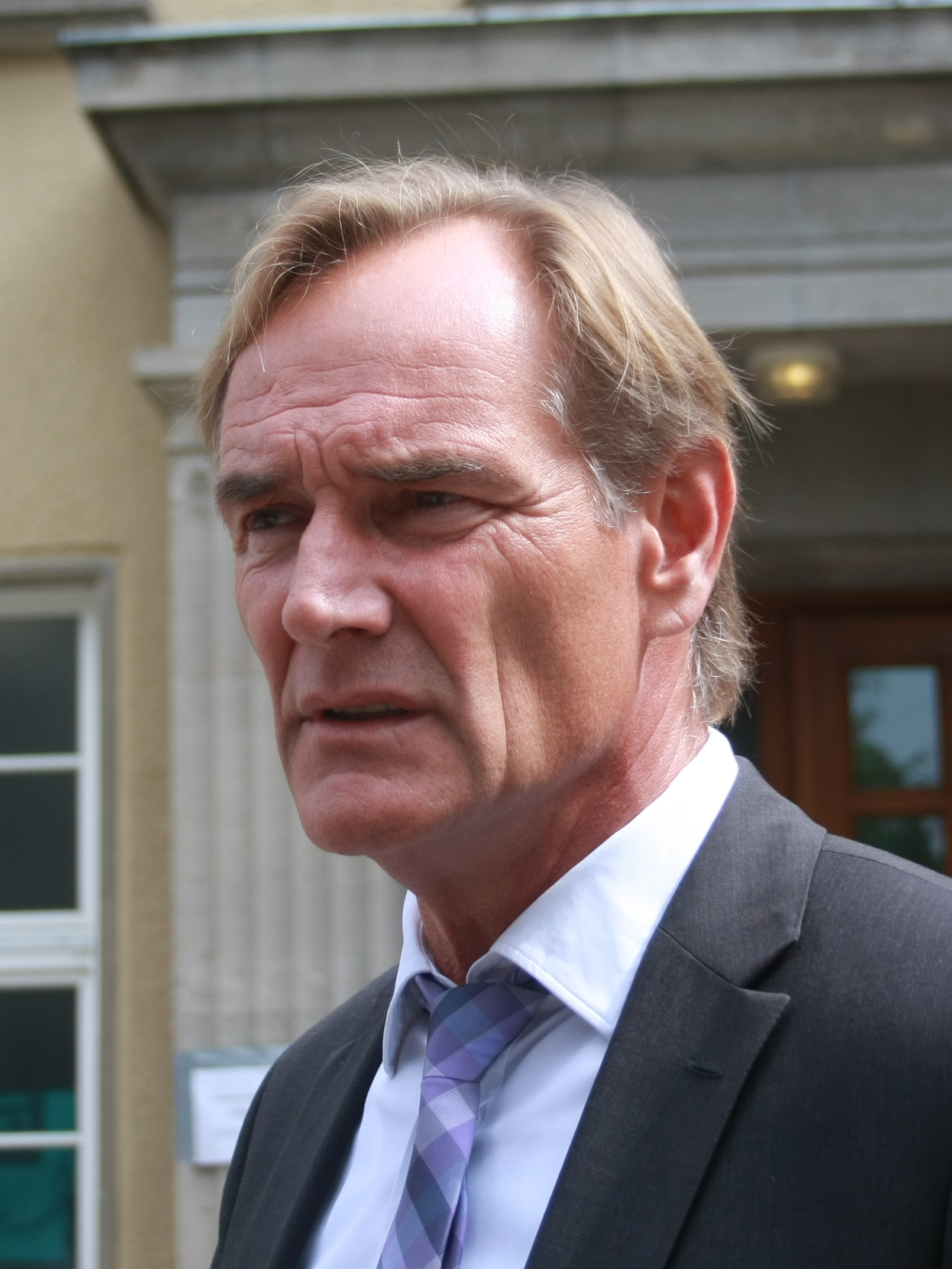
- Burkhard Jung in August 2015

Mayor of Leipzig
- Incumbent
- Assumed office 29 March 2006
- Preceded by: Wolfgang Tiefensee

Personal details
- Born: 7 March 1958 (age 68) Siegen, West Germany
- Party: SPD
- Spouses: Juliane Kirchner (m. 1980; div. 2014) Ayleena Wagner (m. 2016)
- Children: 5, including Alissa Jung, Maja Jung
- Education: Westfälische Wilhelms-Universität (Staatsexamen)
- Occupation: Politician

Burkhard Jung (born 7 March 1958 in Siegen) is a German politician of the Social Democratic Party (SPD) who has been the 21st lord mayor (Oberbürgermeister) of Leipzig (Saxony) since 2006.

== Political career ==
In addition to his role as mayor, Jung has been president of the Association of German Cities since 2019; he is the first representative of an East German city in that office.

In the negotiations to form a Grand Coalition under the leadership of Friedrich Merz's Christian Democrats (CDU together with the Bavarian CSU) and the SPD following the 2025 German elections, Mann was part of the SPD delegation in the working group on government reform and cutting red tape, led by Philipp Amthor, Daniela Ludwig and Sonja Eichwede.

== Other activities ==
=== Corporate boards ===
- European Energy Exchange (EEX), Member of the Supervisory Board
- Leipzig Trade Fair, Chairman of the Supervisory Board
- Leipziger Versorgungs- und Verkehrsgesellschaft (LVV), Chairman of the Supervisory Board
- Mitteldeutsche Flughafen AG, Member of the Supervisory Board
- VNG – Verbundnetz Gas (EEX), Member of the Advisory Board
- Sachsen Bank, Member of the Supervisory Board (-2018)

=== Non-profit organizations ===
- Stiftung Forum Recht, Member of the Board of Trustees (since 2022)
- Business Forum of the Social Democratic Party of Germany, Member of the Political Advisory Board (since 2020)
- American Friends of the Gewandhaus Orchestra Leipzig, Member of the Board of Directors
- HHL Leipzig Graduate School of Management, Member of the Supervisory Board
- Leipzig University of Applied Sciences (HTWK), Member of the Board of Trustees
- Max Planck Institute for Mathematics in the Sciences, Member of the Board of Trustees
- Stiftung Lebendige Stadt, Member of the Board of Trustees

== Personal life ==
From 1980 until their 2014 divorce, Jung was married to Juliane Kirchner. They have four children, including actress Alissa Jung.

He married Ayleena Wagner in 2016, and their daughter was born in 2018.

== See also ==
- List of Social Democratic Party of Germany politicians
