= Layla Fourie =

2013 film

- Directed by: Pia Marais
- Written by: Horst Markgraf; Pia Marais
- Starring: Rayna Campbell
- Cinematography: Andre Chemetoff
- Release date: 11 February 2013 (Berlin)
- Running time: 90 minutes
- Countries: Germany, South Africa, France, Netherlands
- Language: English

Layla Fourie is a 2013 English-language thriller film directed by Pia Marais and co-written by Marais and Horst Markgraf. An international co-production between Germany, South Africa, France and the Netherlands, the film stars Rayna Campbell as a single mother in South Africa who begins work as a polygraph operator and becomes implicated in a crime after a road accident. The film premiered in the Competition section of the 63rd Berlin International Film Festival, where it received a Special Mention from the International Jury.

== Plot ==
Layla Fourie is a single mother in Johannesburg who has trained as a polygraph operator. After obtaining work with a lie-detection and security company, she travels with her young son Kane to a new assignment because Kane's father is unable to care for him. During the journey, an accident occurs, forcing Layla and Kane into a series of lies. As Layla becomes entangled in a criminal investigation, the relationship between mother and son is tested by fear, guilt and mistrust.

== Cast ==
- Rayna Campbell as Layla Fourie
- August Diehl as Eugene Pienaar
- Rapule Hendricks as Kane
- Terry Norton as Constanza Viljoen
- Rapulana Seiphemo as Sipho Khumalo
- Jeroen Kranenburg
- Jeanne Balibar
- Yûho Yamashita as Suzy
- Gérard Rudolf as Van Niekerk

== Production ==
The screenplay was written by Pia Marais and Horst Markgraf. The film was produced by Claudia Steffen and Christoph Friedel, with production companies including Pandora Filmproduktion, Topkapi Films, Cinéma Defacto, WDR, Arte and Spier Productions & DV8 Films/Zinebar. The Match Factory handled international sales.

Marais, who was born in South Africa and based in Germany, set the film in South Africa. Crossing Europe described Layla Fourie as her world premiere in the 2013 Berlinale Competition.

== Release ==
Layla Fourie premiered on 11 February 2013 in the Competition section of the 63rd Berlin International Film Festival. Cineuropa lists theatrical releases in Germany on 4 July 2013, France on 26 March 2014 and the Netherlands on 17 July 2014.

== Reception ==
Guy Lodge of Variety described the film as an unusual character-driven thriller and wrote that it used the conventions of a crime story to examine fear and mistrust in South Africa. Jonathan Romney of Screen Daily wrote that the film's premise gained urgency from Layla's position as a black South African single mother, while noting its mixture of thriller elements and social tension.

In The Guardian, Lodge later called the film a "subtly nervy moral thriller" about a female polygraphist dealing with guilt after a hit-and-run, noting that it had not received a UK theatrical release at the time of the review. Sophie Skinner of TAKE ONE Magazine wrote that the film explored truth, lies and moral responsibility, and considered its treatment of post-apartheid tensions restrained, although she found the ending abrupt.
