= Transamazonia =

2024 film directed by Pia Marais

- Promotional poster
- Directed by: Pia Marais
- Screenplay by: Pia Marais; Willem Droste
- Produced by: Sophie Erbs; Tom Dercourt; Murielle Thierrin; Pierrick Baudouin; Claudia Steffen; Christoph Friedel; Jean-Marc Fröhle; Stefano Centini; Chuti Chang; Camilo Cavalcanti; Viviane Mendonça; Jorane Castro; Pia Marais; Alex C. Lo; Guilherme Cezar Coelho; Fernando Loureiro; Christine Vial-Collet; Thomas Jaubert; Annette Fausbøll; Jean-Alexandre Luciani; Joanne Goh; Keong Low
- Starring: Helena Zengel; Jeremy Xido; Sabine Timoteo; Hamã Luciano; Rômulo Braga; Philipp Lavra; Iwinaiwa Assurini; Pirá Assurini; João Victor Xavante; Kamya Assurini
- Cinematography: Mathieu de Montgrand
- Edited by: Matthieu Laclau; Yann-Shan Tsai
- Music by: Lim Giong
- Production companies: Cinéma Defacto; Gaïjin; Aldabra Films; Pandora Film Produktion; Point Prod; Volos Films; Vitamine C; O Par; Cabocla Filmes; Cinéma Inutile; Tigresa; Matizar Filmes; Moonduckling Films; Jazzy Pictures; WDR-Arte; RTS Radio Télévision Suisse; The Assurini People in Brazil
- Release date: 12 August 2024 (Locarno)
- Running time: 112 minutes
- Countries: Brazil; France; Germany; Switzerland; Taiwan
- Languages: English; Brazilian Portuguese

Transamazonia is a 2024 coming-of-age film directed by Pia Marais, who co-wrote the screenplay with Willem Droste. The film stars Helena Zengel as the daughter of an American missionary in the Amazon rainforest, played by Jeremy Xido, who claims that his daughter is a faith healer.

== Plot ==
As a child, Rebecca is rescued from a plane crash in the Amazon rainforest by a member of a nearby Indigenous tribe. Now a teenager, she is well known in the area as her father, American missionary Lawrence Byrne, claims that she is a faith healer. Rebecca's misgivings about her situation are compounded by the arrival of illegal loggers poised to disrupt the local way of life.

== Cast ==
- Helena Zengel as Rebecca
- Jeremy Xido as Lawrence
- Sabine Timoteo as Denise
- Hamã Luciano
- Rômulo Braga
- Philipp Lavra
- Sérgio Sartório
- Iwinaiwa Assurini
- Pirá Assurini
- João Victor Xavante
- Kamya Assurini

== Production ==
Principal photography for Transamazonia took place in July 2023. The film was presented as a work in progress at the Golden Horse Film Project Promotion that September.

== Release ==
Transamazonia premiered on 12 August 2024 at the 77th Locarno Film Festival, where it competed for the Golden Leopard. The film was also selected for the Main Slate section of the 2024 New York Film Festival.

The film will close the 8th Malaysia International Film Festival on 27 July 2025.

== Reception ==
=== Accolades ===
Award	Ceremony date	Category	Recipient(s)	Ref.
Locarno Film Festival	17 August 2024	Golden Leopard	Nominated	
