= Takut Ke Tak =

2020 Malaysian horror comedy film

- Film poster
- Directed by: Muzzamer Rahman
- Starring: Nabil Aqil; Fabian Loo; Ika Nabila; Arwind Kumar; Han Zalini
- Cinematography: Teck Zee Tan
- Production company: Jazzy Pictures
- Distributed by: GSC Movies
- Release date: 27 August 2020
- Running time: 94 minutes
- Country: Malaysia
- Language: Malay

Takut Ke Tak (English: Scare Or Not) is a 2020 Malaysian Malay-language horror comedy film directed by Muzammer Rahman. It tells the story of five university students who shoots an authentic horror movie in a haunted house, but they ended up haunted by the cheap scares and ghosts living there.

It is released at cinemas on 27 August 2020 in Malaysia and Brunei.

== Synopsis ==
Five film students team up to complete their final year project together. Tired of clichés in nearly all horror films, they decide to shoot an authentic horror film that avoids cheap scares. However, their plan to film in a haunted house quickly turns into a nightmare. As they stay in the house to shoot, they begin to feel as though they are actually in a movie when every horror film cliché unfolds around them. The ghosts want to be part of their film too—can they escape?

== Cast ==
- Nabil Aqil as Abbas
- Fabian Loo as Yang Guo
- Ika Nabila as Linda
- Arwind Kumar as Sivar
- Han Zalini as Amir
- Daniella Sya as Beauty Ghost
- Delimawati as Nenek Moyang
- Ropie Cecupak as Professor
- Sherry Aljeffri as Scary Granny

== Release ==
The film features local well-known newcomers and multi-ethnic cast, including actor and model Nabil Aqil, actor Fabian Loo, influencer Arwind Kumar, actress Ika Nabella, and musician Han Zalini. The film was originally scheduled to be released on 2 April 2020, but was delayed due to the COVID-19 pandemic.
