= Jan Hahn =

German television presenter and radio host (1973–2021)

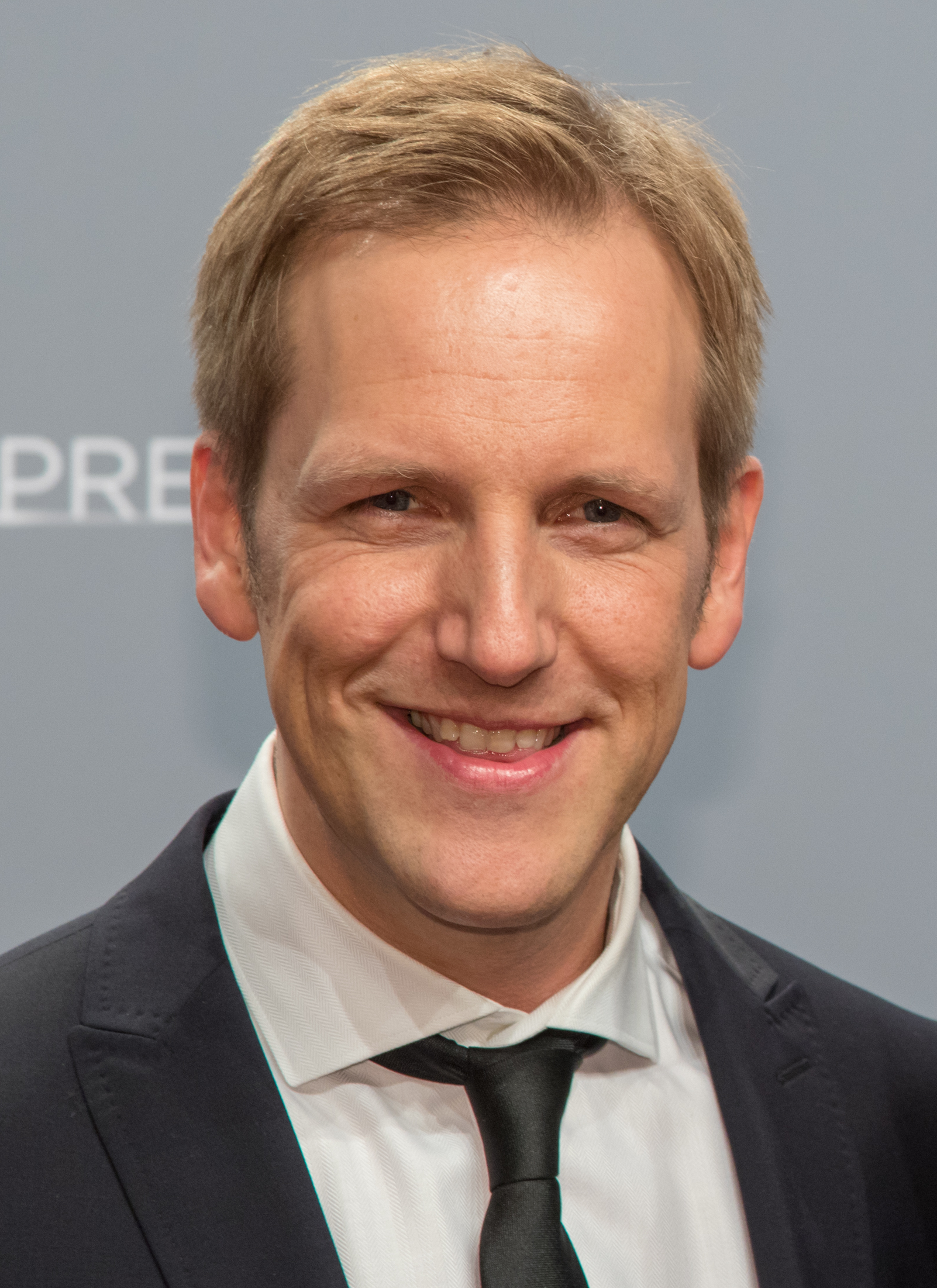
Hahn in 2018

Jan Hahn (22 September 1973 – 4 May 2021) was a German radio and television presenter and actor.

== Background ==
Hahn had his first television experience in 2001 for the Mitteldeutscher Rundfunk as an outdoor presenter at Let's Dance. In 2002, he presented the Jan Hahn Show on the NRJ Group Berlin station.
