= Mondher Rayahneh =

Jordanian actor (born 1979)

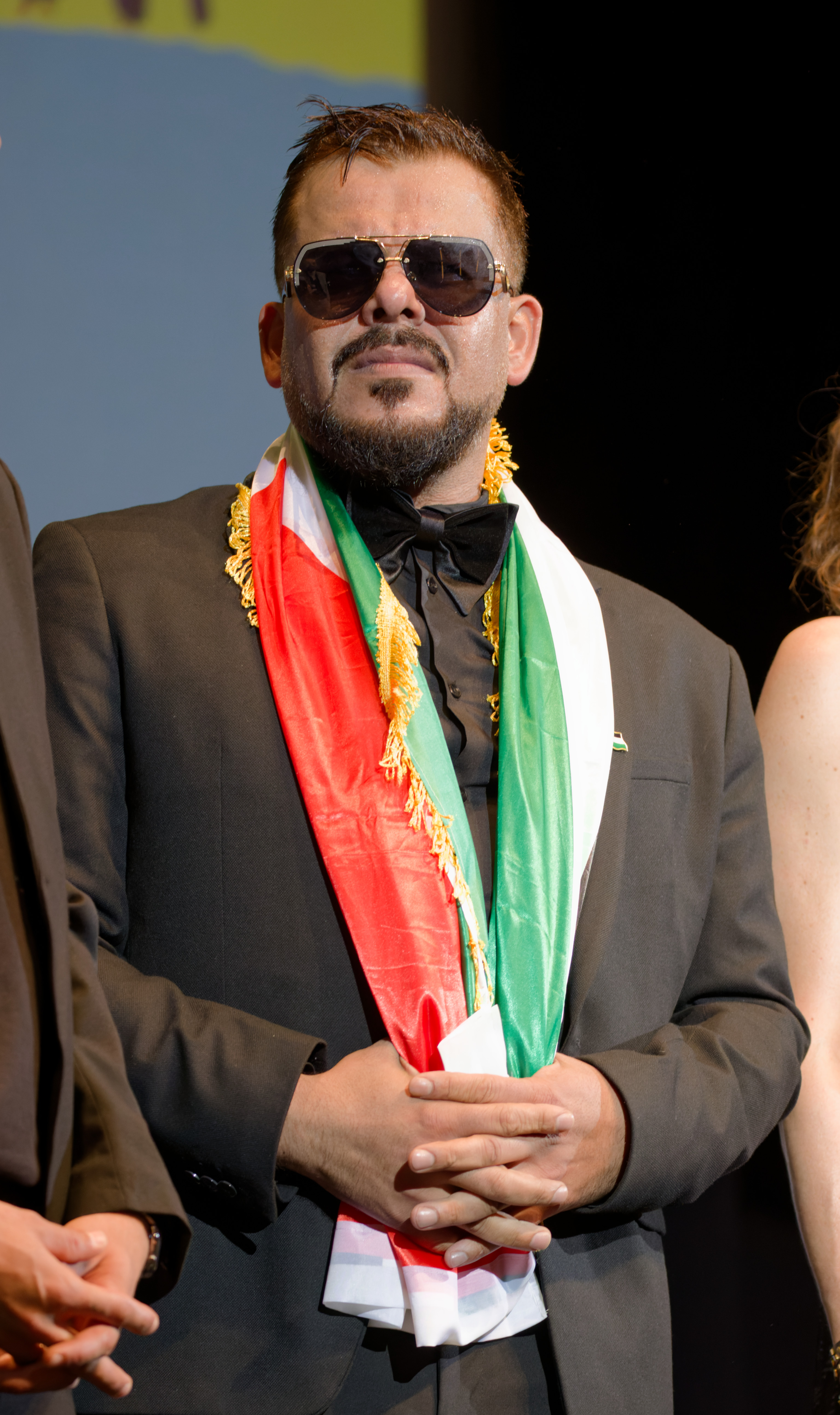
- Rayahneh at the 2024 Cannes Film Festival
- Born: 8 April 1979 (age 47); Irbid, Jordan
- Occupation: Actor
- Years active: 2004–present

Monther Rayahneh (Arabic: منذر رياحنة; also spelt Mondher Rayahneh) (born 8 April 1979) is a Jordanian actor. After studying Dramatic Arts in Yarmouk University, he participated in several TV dramas. He became famous for his roles as knight or prince in Bedouin and Historical series.

He received best actor award in Cairo Arab Media Festival for his role as " Awda Abou Taya ".

He was one of the casts of the TV series "Al Ijtiyah - الاجتياح" (The Invasion) that won an International Emmy Award in the Telenovella category.
