= Pia Marais =

Filmmaker (born 1971)

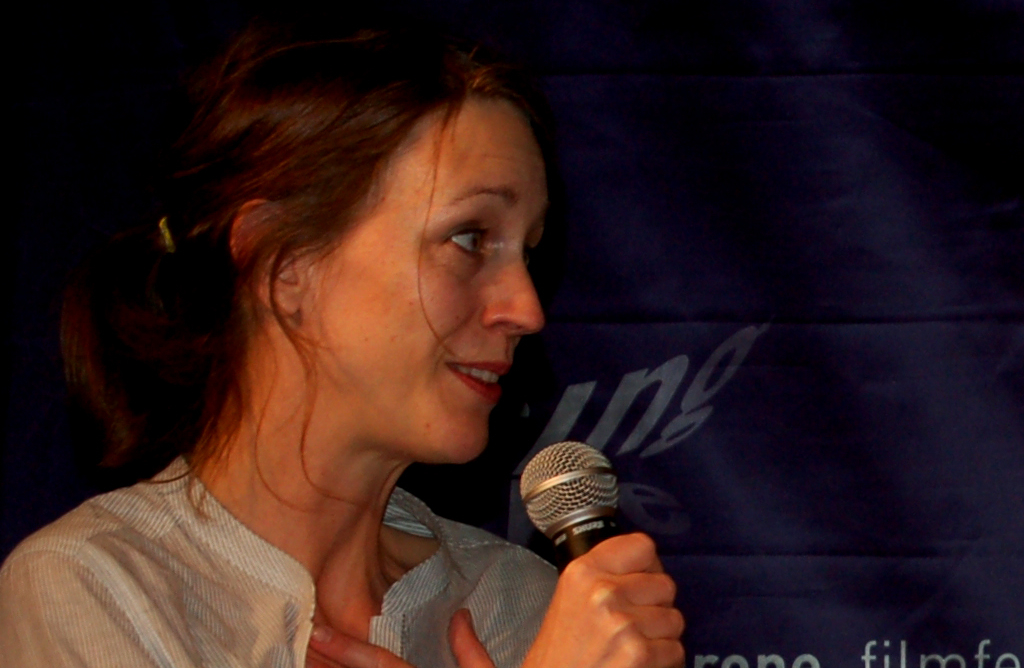
- Born: 1971 (age 53–54); Johannesburg, South Africa
- Occupation: Film director

Pia Marais (born 1971) is a South African filmmaker based in Germany.

== Early life and education ==
Pia Marais was born in Johannesburg to a Swedish mother and South African father. She lived in South Africa, Sweden, and Spain as a child.

Marais studied sculpture and photography in London and Amsterdam as well as at the Kunstakademie Düsseldorf. She went on to study filmmaking at the Deutsche Film- und Fernsehakademie Berlin.

== Career ==
Marais directed four short films at the start of her career: Loop (1996), Deranged (1998), Tricky People (1999), and 17 (2003). During this time, she also worked as a casting director and script supervisor.

The Unpolished, Marais' semi-autobiographical feature directorial debut, premiered at the 2007 International Film Festival Rotterdam, where it won a Tiger Award. Her 2010 feature film, At Ellen's Age, starred Jeanne Balibar as a woman who roams the world after abandoning her former life. The film premiered in competition at the Locarno Film Festival in 2010.

Marais' third feature film, the South Africa-set thriller Layla Fourie about a young mother confronting her guilt after a hit and run accident, premiered at the 63rd Berlin International Film Festival in 2013, where it was recognized with a special mention by the international jury.

In 2017, Marais became a professor at the Academy of Media Arts Cologne. She was one of 45 directors from across Europe who contributed to the 2019 television documentary 24h Europe - The Next Generation.

Transamazonia, Marais' 2024 feature film about a girl in the Amazon rainforest whose father claims she is a faith healer, premiered in competition at the 77th Locarno Film Festival.

== Personal life ==
Marais resides in Berlin.

== Filmography ==
=== Film ===
Year	Title	Notes	Ref.
1996	Loop	Short film	
1998	Deranged	Short film	
1999	Tricky People	Short film	
2003	17	Short film	
2007	The Unpolished	—	
2010	At Ellen's Age	—	
2013	Layla Fourie	—	
2024	Transamazonia	—	

=== Television ===
Year	Title	Notes	Ref.
2019	24h Europe - The Next Generation	One of 45 directors involved in the documentary.	

== Awards and nominations ==
Year	Award	Category	Nominated work	Result	Ref.
2007	International Film Festival Rotterdam	Tiger Award	The Unpolished	Won	
2007	Crossing Europe Film Festival	Crossing Europe Award	The Unpolished	Won	
2007	Durban International Film Festival	Best First Feature	The Unpolished	Won	
2007	Buenos Aires International Film Festival	Signis Award	The Unpolished	Won	
2007	Cine Las Palmas	Special Mention	The Unpolished	Won	
2010	Locarno Film Festival	Golden Leopard	At Ellen's Age	Nominated	
2010	Kinofest Lünen	Best Screenplay	At Ellen's Age	Won	
2013	Berlin International Film Festival	Golden Bear	Layla Fourie	Nominated	
2013	Berlin International Film Festival	Special Mention, International Jury	Layla Fourie	Won	
2024	Locarno Film Festival	Golden Leopard	Transamazonia	Pending	
