= Marina Romea =

Coordinates: 44°30′56″N 12°16′17″E

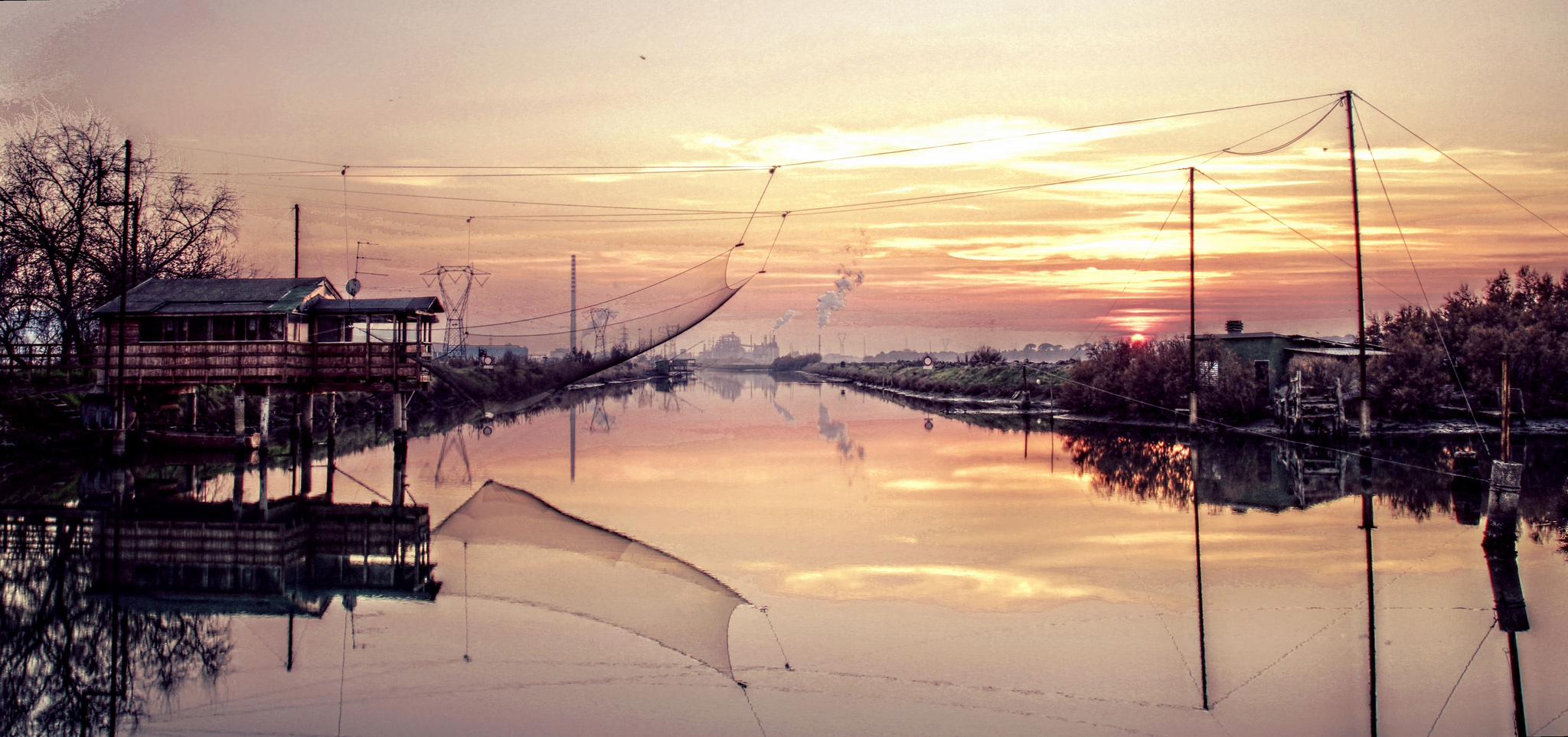
Marina Romea

Marina Romea is a village in the municipality of Ravenna, located on the coast north of the city, between Porto Corsini and Casal Borsetti. It is part of the constituency no. 4 "of the sea", based in Marina di Ravenna.
