= Nina Franoszek =

German-American actress

Nina Franoszek is a German-American actress and film and theater director. Franoszek was awarded an Adolf Grimme Award for "Outstanding Lead Actress in a Drama Series" for her performance in the TV miniseries Sardsch (1998).

== Early life and education ==
Nina Franoszek was born in Berlin, West Germany to the fine artists Sabine Franek and Eduard Franoszek, who was also a professor at the Berlin University of the Arts.

She graduated from high school (Abitur) in 1981.

Franoszek began working as a dancer, and also posed as a life model for German neo-expressionist painters Rainer Fetting, G.L. Gabriel, and Salomé. In 1982 she played roles in two films, Domino (1982) by Thomas Brasch and Be Gentle, Penguin (1982) by Peter Hajek.

Franoszek studied mime and dance in summer seminars at the University of Music and Performing Arts in Vienna and enrolled at the Free University of Berlin for Japanese Studies and Ethnology. In 1984 she was an exchange student with the Moscow Art Theater School and the Theater Academy Wachtangow in Leningrad (now Saint Petersburg State Theatre Arts Academy). She earned a master's degree in Performing Arts (BFA & MFA) from the Hochschule für Musik, Theater und Medien Hannover (HMTMH) in 1986, and began to work in regional and national theatre.

She was a working finalist of the Actors Studio West in Los Angeles.

== Acting career ==
Franoszek's acting talent was said to have been "discovered" by famous German director Rainer Werner Fassbinder.

=== Film and television ===
Franoszek played a range of roles from tragedy to comedy in over 100 feature films, television movies and series. She played a role in Buster's Bedroom, a comedy directed by Rebecca Horn which earned a German Film Award (1992). She also performed in The Pianist by Roman Polanski, had a leading role in the feature film Martha, and guest starred as Greta in the TV series Mad Men.

Franoszek starred opposite Jiří Menzel in Joint Venture, and also performed in The Party-Nature Morte and in Murderous Decisions. Kevin Spacey cast her as Patty Duke in Beyond the Sea and she plays the leading role in Visioner directed by Elodie Keene.

She is the first person narrator of Marlene Dietrich in Marlene Dietrich: Her Own Song, a documentary directed by Dietrich's grandson, J. David Riva.

Franoszek played a spy in the action-adventure series Berlin Break, for Columbia/Sony Pictures and RTL Germany. In the Twentieth Century Fox TV series The Loop Franoszek guest starred in her first role in Icelandic-language.

She plays the director of the Berlin-Hohenschönhausen Memorial in 12 Means I Love You (German title: 12 Heisst Ich Liebe Dich), a sequel to The Lives of Others, which premiered at the Hof International Film Festival 2007.

In 2008 Franoszek made several guest appearances as Greta in Mad Men and in Illeana Douglas's web series Easy to Assemble, and appeared in an episode of the TV series Children's Hospital. She played a recurring role in the second season of the award-winning German TV series The Weissensee Saga.

In 2014, Franoszek played the role of Frau Engel in the video game Wolfenstein: The New Order. She once again performed this role in the 2017 sequel, Wolfenstein II: The New Colossus.

Franoszek is a member of Deutsche Filmakademie (Germany's equivalent of the Academy of Motion Pictures Arts and Sciences); member of the German Directors Guild (BVR); Co–initiator and member of the German Screen Actors Guild (BFFS); member of SAG-AFTRA, member of Villa Aurora Foundation for European American Relations. She also served as a juror for the International Emmy Awards from 2007 to 2013.

=== Theater ===
Franoszek is an experienced classical actress. She made her stage debut at the Niedersächsisches Staatstheater Hannover, the national theatre in Hanover, Germany in 1985. She performed a range of roles at various national theaters, including Allisen in Look Back in Anger, Honey in Who's Afraid of Virginia Woolf?, Dunjascha in The Cherry Orchard, to Eve in The Broken Jug by Heinrich von Kleist and Lady Macbeth in Macbeth. She also played the lead role in the Russian plays, Time for Love, by Valentin Kataev and The Sarcophagus by Vladimir Gubarev, a play about the Chernobyl disaster.

As a member of the Berlin-based English Theater Group Berlin Play Actors, she played Estelle in the existentialist play No Exit, by French writer Jean Paul Sartre.

== Directing ==
In 1999, Franoszek made her debut as a theater director at the Pacific Resident Theatre, Los Angeles, with two Strindberg plays starring, among others, Orson Bean, Alley Mills, and Paula Malcomson.

In 2006 she directed her first movie, the courtroom drama Der große Videoschwindel ("Spin Doctor"), starring Karoline Eichhorn, Nikki von Tempelhof, and Justus von Dohnányi, which premiered in May 2007 and was invited to the International Cannes Film Festival (2007), German Film section.

== Awards ==
- 1998: Grimme-Preis in the category Outstanding Lead Actress in a Drama Series, for her performance in the TV miniseries Sardsch

== Filmography ==
=== Film ===
- 1982: Domino
- 1982: Be Gentle, Penguin
- 1991: Buster's Bedroom
- 1991: The Party – Nature Morte
- 1993: Ohne Mich
- 1994: Joint Venture
- 1995: Silent Night (German: Stille Nacht)
- 2000: Casting About
- 2001: The Living Room Fountain
- 2001: Marlene Dietrich – Her Own Song
- 2002: The Pianist
- 2004: Beyond the Sea
- 2005: Miriam
- 2008: Martha

=== Television ===
- 1990: Steuergeheimnisse (German TV film)
- 1992: Die Liebesreise des Herrn Matzke (German TV film)
- 1992: Berlin Break (TV series)
- 1994: Inspector Rex (Austrian TV series, Season 1, Episode 11: Deadly Teddies)
- 1994: Julie Lescaut (French police TV series, episode: L'Enfant témoin)
- 1995: Zwei Männer und die Frauen (German-Italian TV series)
- 1997: Nur für eine Nacht (German TV film)
- 1998: SK Kölsch (German TV series)
- 1998: Im Atem der Berge (German TV film)
- 1998: Krambambuli (Austrian TV film)
- 1998: Inspector Rex (Austrian TV series, Season 4, Episode 2: Death Of A Student)
- 1999: Schande (German TV film)
- 1999: Tatort (German TV series, episode: Tödliches Labyrinth)
- 1999: Lexx (Canadian TV series)
- 2002: Tatort (German TV series, episode: Endspiel)
- 2002–2003: Körner und Köter (German TV series)
- 2004: Im Namen des Gesetzes (German TV series)
- 2006: Ein Sommer mit Paul (German TV film)
- 2007: 12 heißt: Ich Liebe Dich (German TV film)
- 2007: The Loop (American TV series, season 2 episode 1: "Windows")
- 2008: Mad Men (American TV series, season 2, episode 11 "The Jet Set")
- 2009: Beyond the Wall (Jenseits der Mauer) (TV film)
- 2011: Easy to Assemble (American Webseries)
- 2011: Scharfe Hunde (German TV film)
- 2013: Children's Hospital (American TV series, season 5, episode 51 "The Gang gets Sushi")
- 2013: Weissensee (German TV series)

=== Video game ===
- 2014 and 2017: Wolfenstein: The New Order and Wolfenstein II: The New Colossus (as Frau Engel)
