= Pravda.ru =

Russian news website founded in 1999

- Type: Online newspaper
- Owner: Vadim Gorshenin
- Editor: Inna Novikova
- Founded: January 27, 1999 (27 years ago)
- Political alignment: Russian nationalism Neo-Sovietism
- Language: Russian; English; Portuguese; French
- Headquarters: Staraya Basmannaya Street, 16/2 Moscow, Russia
- Website: pravda.ru

Pravda.ru (Russian: Правда.Ру, lit. 'truth'), formerly Pravda Online, is a Russian online newspaper established in 1999 and owned by Pravda.ru Holding headed by Vadim Gorshenin.

== History ==
After the collapse of the Soviet Union, the oldest Soviet paper founded in 1912, Pravda, split into two different papers. Significant members of the main editorial staff (Viktor Afanasiev, Gennady Seleznev, Yuri Zhukov, Vera Tkachenko and Vadim Gorshenin) left Pravda to form the online news and opinion website Pravda Online.

Pravda.ru was registered in November 1999 and has been published since January 27, 1999.

Following a court case the Pravda name was allowed to be used by both the newspaper owned by the Communist Party of the Russian Federation and Pravda Online run by journalists associated with the defunct Soviet Pravda.

In 2013 the website became notable in western media when then-US Senator John McCain published an opinion piece for it, confusing it for the Soviet-era paper of the same name.

== Editorial policy and author composition ==
=== Editorial principles ===
The editorial team of Pravda.ru openly publishes its key working principles, including the criteria for selecting news, approach to information verification, editorial independence, and principles of interaction with readers. These principles are available for public access on the official website of the publication.

The website features an open authorship system: each journalist has a public personal page that reflects their biography, publication archive, and specialization.

In 2004, the editor-in-chief of Pravda.ru, Inna Novikova, stated in an interview that the website had surpassed the Soviet-era Political News Agency in terms of influence.

=== Author composition ===
For many years, the editorial board of Pravda.ru was headed by Soviet and Russian journalist, writer, and playwright Vladimir Gubarev — the author of the play "Sarcophagus", dedicated to the Chernobyl disaster. He was also the curator of the "Tea Party at the Academy" project (see below).

Among the notable authors who have collaborated with Pravda.ru are journalist and writer Vsevolod Ovchinnikov, publicist and political observer Mikhail Domogatskikh, writer Anatoly Salutskiy, politician and publicist Viktor Ilyukhin, and journalist Anatoly Baranov.

Among current authors is special correspondent Darya Aslamova, formerly known as a war correspondent for Komsomolskaya Pravda. She covers conflicts and crisis situations in various regions of the world, both in video format and written articles.

=== Scientific and cultural initiatives ===
In the early 2000s, Pravda.ru launched the author project "Tea Parties at the Academy", curated by writer and journalist Vladimir Gubarev — a former journalist for the Soviet "Pravda" and author of the play "Sarcophagus", dedicated to the Chernobyl disaster. Within the framework of the project, interviews were published with leading scientists from the Russian Academy of Sciences, including Nobel laureates and experts in physics, chemistry, biology, mathematics, and space.

Interviews from this series were cited in educational and academic publications, including the State Polytechnic Museum publications, the MEPhI repository, and educational portals.

The complete archive of interviews is available in the "Academy" section of the Pravda.ru website.

== Criticism ==
In 2004, the news agency REGNUM characterized Pravda.ru as a "pioneer of Russian internet propaganda", noting its active involvement in information campaigns and high traffic to the site.

A 2012 article by the Guardian describes Pravda.ru as a pro-Kremlin news website that amplifies Russian disinformation and propaganda.

== McCain controversy ==
In 2013, after Russian President Vladimir Putin published an op-ed in The New York Times in support of Syrian President Bashar al-Assad, US senator John McCain announced that he would publish a response article in Pravda, referring to the newspaper owned by the Communist Party of the Russian Federation. McCain, however, eventually published his op-ed on Pravda.ru. This caused protests from the editor of communist Pravda Boris Komotsky and a response from the editor of English.Pravda.ru Dmitry Sudakov: Komotsky claimed that "there is only one Pravda in Russia, it is the organ of the Communist Party, and we have heard nothing about the intentions of the Republican senator" and dismissed Pravda.ru as an "Oklahoma-City-Pravda", while Sudakov derided Komotsky, claiming that "the circulation of the Communist Party Pravda is like a factory newspaper of AvtoVAZ from the Soviet times". McCain later attempted to publish his op-ed in the Communist Pravda as well, but the paper refused to publish it "because it was not aligned to the political positions of the Communist Party of the Russian Federation".
