= Soyuzpechat =

- Союзпечать
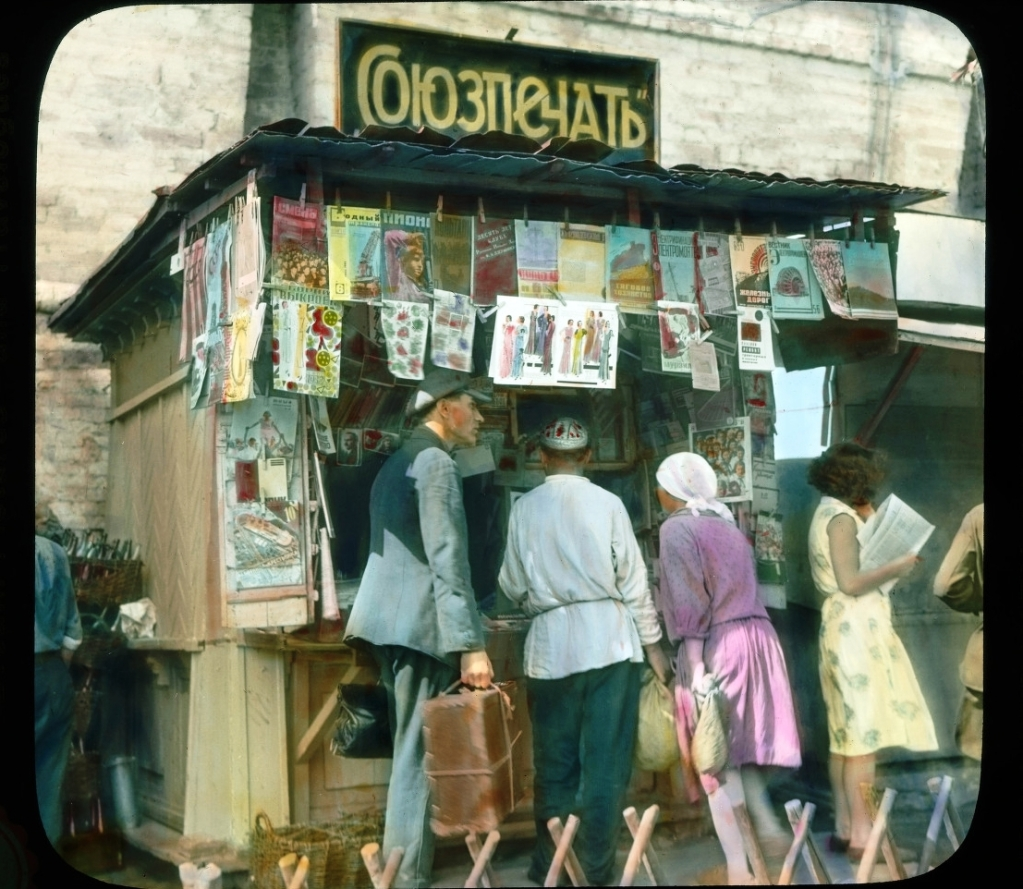
- Soyuzpechat kiosk near Kitay-gorod wall in Moscow, 1931

Agency overview
- Formed: 1930
- Dissolved: 1991
- Superseding agency: Rospechat (in Russia)
- Jurisdiction: USSR
- Parent department: Soviet Ministry of Communications

Soyuzpechat (Russian: Союзпечать) was a Soviet-era government agency and network of organizations and enterprises for the distribution of periodicals, first under the People's Commissariat for Communications and then under the Ministry of Communications of the Soviet Union. Since 1965, the specialized Central Philatelic Agency "Soyuzpechat" operated within the structure of this department, responsible for the preparation and distribution of philatelic materials and literature. Throughout its history, its divisions were organizationally subordinate to the following organizations:

- The Central Agency of the All-Russian Central Executive Committee (Tsentropechat; 1918–1921)
- The All-Union Association Soyuzpechat (1930–1932)
- The Central Administration for Print Distribution Soyuzpechat (1932–1953)
- The Main Administration for Print Distribution Soyuzpechat (1953–1987)
- The Central Retail and Subscription Agency Soyuzpechat (1987–1994).

After the collapse of the Soviet Union, the Soyuzpechat system was reorganized and came under the control of the Rospechat Agency.

== History ==
=== Background ===
The distribution of press and books in pre-revolutionary Russia was an important component of society's infrastructure. This was handled by cooperatives (forwarding and delivering to cities) and private subscription agencies, whose functions also included posting posters and delivering urgent letters and valuable parcels to homes. Since 1906, a network of kiosks, "A.S. Suvorin's Counter-Agency," operated at railway stations, selling newspapers and magazines.

=== Early Soviet Period ===
In November 1917, Suvorin's private enterprise was nationalized, and on its basis, first the Counter-Agency of the Central Executive Committee of the USSR, and then the Agency of the All-Russian Central Executive Committee was established.

On November 21, 1918, a decree signed by Vladimir Lenin by the Council of People's Commissars of the RSFSR assigned the People's Commissariat of Posts and Telegraphs responsibility for the centralized distribution and forwarding of Soviet periodicals. In pursuance of this decree, a special printing department was created. As a result of these decisions by the Council of People's Commissars, the Central Agency of the All-Russian Central Executive Committee (Tsentropechat) was established in November 1918. It united all existing supply channels at the time, and by May 1919, in accordance with the second decree of the Council of People's Commissars of May 5 of that year, it virtually single-handedly assumed the responsibility for the distribution of periodicals and literature in the young Soviet Union.

Tsentropechat's apparatus had an extensive network. Twenty-two departments were organized in Moscow, employing a total of 3,000 people. In total, Tsentropechat employed 17,000 people. The agency's forwarding services included:

- six central forwarding departments (baggage, mail, book, sets, commissariat, and record forwarding),
- eight newspaper forwarding departments at printing houses,
- nine train station forwarding departments, and
- 11 district forwarding departments.

From January 1, 1919, all postal and telegraph offices in Soviet Russia began to carry out retail sales of newspapers and books and distribution of printed materials by subscription.

On December 13, 1921, the Board of the Agitation Propaganda Department of the Central Committee of the RCP(b) resolved to liquidate Tsentropechat and create an agency for the distribution and forwarding of Soviet and party press, operating as a state institution, operating on the basis of a cooperative partnership with shares, in which Soviet, party, and professional newspapers were shareholders and participants. In accordance with this decision, the Central Expedition of Soviet and Party Press (TsEP) was established in January 1922. At the same time, in early 1922, the former railway department of Tsentropechat was reformed into a Printing Contractor Agency. Beginning in 1924, a Newspaper Association began operating under the Printing Department of the Central Committee of the CPSU, under which a Printing Distribution Commission was organized. In 1926, another agency was established—the Publishing Technical Subcommission on Distribution Issues under the Press Committee.

=== Foundation of Soyuzpechat ===
As the number of titles and print runs of printed publications distributed in the Soviet Union increased, the imperfections of the existing distribution mechanisms became increasingly apparent. To modernize the system, on August 16, 1930, by decision of the Council of People's Commissars of the Soviet Union, a centralized and widely distributed All-Union Association, Soyuzpechat, was established. At the local level, Soyuzpechat departments were subordinate to regional post and telegraph offices.

In June 1932, the Central Administration for the Distribution of Soyuzpechat Press was established within the People's Commissariat of Communications of the Soviet Union. It was tasked with organizing the reception of publications, developing subscription technology, and retail distribution. Its strongholds were:

- The Central Newspaper and Magazine Post Office,
- Soyuzpechat's Central Subscription Office (since August 1932),
- Soyuzpechat's Central Retail Office (since September 1932),
- Local, regional, provincial, and city departments,
- printing departments and district organizers at district post offices.

Soyuzpechat's regional departments were organized within regional post offices, and special print distribution departments—Soyuzpechat's district (city) bureaus—were established in district centers. In August 1932, republican, regional, and provincial subscription offices were also opened within Soyuzpechat's branches in 14 cities across the country, and by September of that year, regional retail offices were established in 21 cities. In 1937, Soyuzpechat assumed control of the management and dispatch functions for periodicals, as well as newspaper and magazine post offices and dispatch services, which had previously been subordinate to the Postal Administration of the People's Commissariat of Communications.

Thanks to efforts to develop the subscription and retail industries, by the beginning of 1941, the total circulation of city and regional newspapers reached 10.5 million copies, and the total circulation of magazines reached 11.5 million. At that time, there were approximately 5,500 Soyuzpechat kiosks in cities, railway stations, and villages across the Soviet Union.

=== Wartime ===
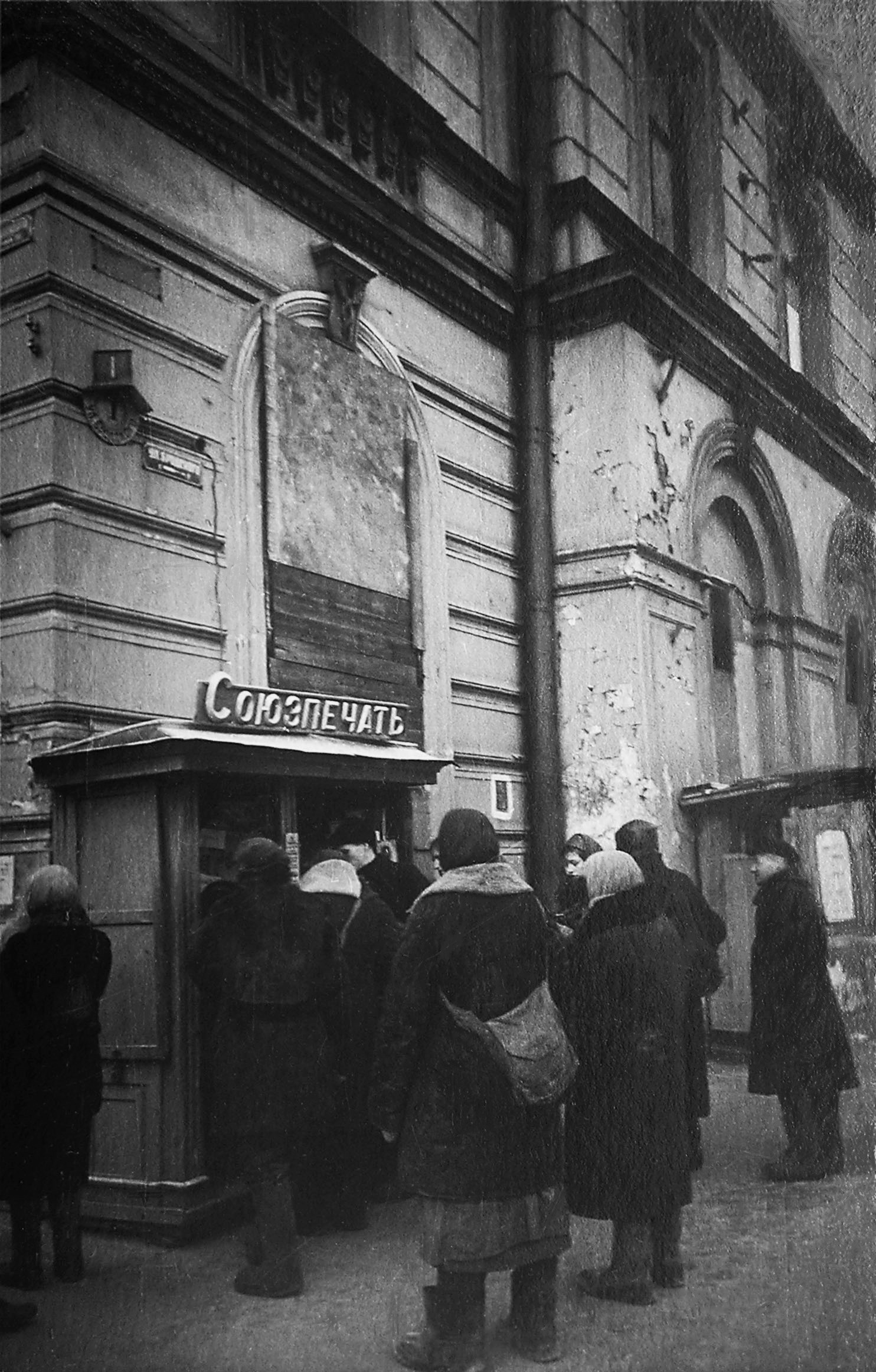
Soyuzpechat during the Siege of Leningrad, 1942.

During the Great Patriotic War, Soyuzpechat continued to provide its services at the front and in the rear, but its forms and methods of operation changed significantly. Priority delivery of the required quantity of central newspapers was given to combat army units. This difficult task was carried out by employees of the military and civilian postal services and Soyuzpechat, in conjunction with the Main Political Directorate of the Red Army. Next, supplies were provided to reserve and rear formations of the active army, and then to the general population. Widespread individual subscriptions gave way to limited distribution of newspapers and magazines to industrial enterprises, educational institutions, collective and state farms.

Military expeditions often used aviation to distribute printed materials to the front. In frontline areas, they supplied military units with the press, often under conditions that required courage and heroism in the performance of their duties. For exemplary fulfillment of Party and government assignments in the area of press distribution during wartime, a large group of Soyuzpechat employees were awarded state awards in June 1943.

Newspaper display windows became crucial in cities during the war, and their network expanded by almost half. In 1943 alone, their number increased from 78,300 to 116,000. At the same time, due to the capture of part of the country by German troops, the number of Soyuzpechat kiosks significantly decreased—to 2,100, of which 500 were in rural areas and 1,600 in cities. During this period, agency employees carried out public service work distributing combat leaflets, posters, and slogans at the front, and special "lightning bulletins," leaflets, and bulletins in the rear under the slogan "Everything for the Front!".

=== Post-war Years ===
In the second half of the 1940s and 1950s, the pre-war press distribution system was restored and further developed. Following the post-war Decree issued by the Council of Ministers of the Soviet Union, the distribution of print media among organizations and enterprises, characteristic of wartime, was replaced by a traditional distribution system of free sale and individual subscriptions. By the beginning of 1947, the circulation of Central Newspapers and magazines had increased by 7.1 million copies compared to the wartime level, bringing the total to 27.3 million. However, only 4,560 kiosks existed throughout the country, and in 1951, a goal was set to establish 5,000 new kiosks in district centers, state farms, and collective farms. Particular attention was given to the sale of printed publications on trains and at railway stations, direct supply to 350 station kiosks, and expansion of the network of kiosks at airports and on waterways.

In 1953, the former department was reorganized into the Main Directorate for Print Distribution "Soyuzpechat" of the Ministry of Communications of the Soviet Union. Changes then affected the Central Newspaper and Magazine Post Office. Forwarding functions were transferred to postal institutions.

In the mid-1950s, thanks to the active work of Soyuzpechat, there were 290 newspapers and magazines per thousand people in the USSR, and the catalog of Soviet newspapers and magazines was constantly expanding with new titles. In 1954, subscriptions and distribution of newspapers and magazines from socialist countries began. Between 1959 and 1965, Soyuzpechat's operations and the structure of its agencies were streamlined, improving public service. By 1963, a series of changes had resulted in a clear industry structure capable of meeting the growing printing needs of Soviet citizens.

The 1960s also saw the technical re-equipment of the industry: new Soyuzpechat kiosks and stores were built, newspaper vending machines were installed, and transportation was improved.

In 1964, a portion of the profits from Soyuzpechat's subordinate enterprises began to be allocated to the acquisition of production equipment, mechanization, and the construction of production buildings. This allowed the agency to strengthen and expand its material and technical resources. District and city agency buildings were constructed using standard designs, and the network of kiosks increased to 22,000 units.

The agency's structure also changed. In May 1963, the Central Order Processing Office and the Central Retail Office were replaced by the Central Subscription Agency and the Central Retail Agency (CSA and CRA). The following year, independent self-supporting enterprises—the subscription and retail agencies of Soyuzpechat—emerged in regional, territorial, and republican centers of the RSFSR. That same year, 1964, a subscription system for accepting subscriptions using cash registers was launched; this significantly improved the quality and efficiency of production processes at Soyuzpechat enterprises.

=== Late Soviet Period ===
In 1969, the Soyuzpechat Kustovsky Computing Center in Ryazan was commissioned. It addressed a wide range of subscription and retail issues, automating the processes of collecting, transmitting, and processing information, with automated issuance of control, settlement, and shipping documentation.

The scope of activities of the department's enterprises also expanded:

- The range of products in retail was expanded (1971);
- Materials published by scientific and technical information agencies and the Plakat publishing house were accepted for centralized distribution and shipping (1974);
- A subscription with a break for part of the term was introduced (1979);
- The purchase of used magazines from the public and their sale in retail outlets was permitted (1981).

By 1980, Soyuzpechat had a solid material and technical base and demonstrated stable economic performance:

- The average annual number of employees in print distribution was 84,800;
- The kiosk network had grown to 34,300 units;
- There were 620 Soyuzpechat stores and 11,600 vending machines.

In October 1987, the Ministry of Communications of the Soviet Union merged the Central Retail and Subscription Agency (CRSA) and the Central Retail and Subscription Agency (CRSA) into a single organization—the Central Retail and Subscription Agency Soyuzpechat. In 1988, the Main Directorate of Postal Service and Printing Distribution (GUPSiRP) of the Ministry of Communications of the Soviet Union was established, responsible for the development and improvement of postal service and print distribution. At the same time, the post offices began to deal directly with subscriptions, and the responsibilities of the Central Publishing House “Soyuzpechat” included only the retail distribution of print media, the publication of subscription catalogues and the processing of subscription orders.

=== Post-Soviet period ===
After the collapse of the USSR, the industry underwent reform. In November 1992, a decree of the President of Russia was issued, replacing the State Postal Service and the Regional Postal Service under the Ministry of Communications with the Federal Postal Service Administration. Russian post offices were responsible for organizing subscriptions to periodicals, while Soyuzpechat was solely responsible for the retail distribution of periodicals.

In 1994, in accordance with the state privatization program, Soyuzpechat was corporatized as an Open joint-stock company, and the Rospechat Agency was established on its basis. By December 1994, 47 regional offices (the majority) of the former all-Russian network had been privatized and corporatized.

Although the Soyuzpechat agency ceased operations with the dissolution of the Soviet Union, the brand continues to be used today in the names of specialized and non-specialized associations and companies. One such organization is the non-profit partnership "National Press Distribution Network Soyuzpechat", founded on February 14, 2005, which unites enterprises distributing printed publications in Russia and Belarus. The Soyuzpechat name is borne by some regional press distribution companies and advertising and production firms in Russia, as well as organizations and companies in Belarus, Ukraine, and several other countries of the former Soviet Union.

== Central Philatelic Agency Soyuzpechat ==
According to the Resolution of the Council of Ministers of the Soviet Union No. 733 of October 4, 1965, "On measures to improve the publication of postage stamps and trade in them", the Ministry of Communications of the USSR was entrusted with the organization of philately in the country, determining the print runs and themes of the publication of collectible stamps, implementing their sales and publishing catalogs of postage stamps. In October 1965, the tasks of developing philately in the Soviet Union were assigned to the Main Directorate for the Distribution of the Press "Soyuzpechat". Its responsibilities began to include the sale of all philatelic materials in the country, in connection with which the Central Philatelic Agency "Soyuzpechat" (Russian: Центральное филателистическое агентство «Союзпечать») was established within its structure that same year. Some of the new stamps published in the USSR were sent to this agency for sale in "Philately" shops specially organized within this system. Philatelic materials were sold at Soyuzpechat stores and kiosks at state prices. To supply members of the All-Union Philatelist Society (VOF) with collectible materials, a subscription system was introduced at Soyuzpechat retail outlets. Other philatelic goods, such as stamp stickers, were also available for sale at Soyuzpechat's retail network.

Furthermore, Soyuzpechat distributed sets of collectible postage stamps—in the form of thematic and annual bound notebooks and pre-packaged sets. These were primarily intended for beginning philatelists.
