= Körner und Köter =

- Starring: Max Tidof
- Country of origin: Germany

Körner und Köter is a German family comedy/drama television series that was broadcast on Sat.1 first as a pilot then in eight parts from 2002 to 2003.

== Production ==
In Fall 2002, five pilots were shown on the German television channel Sat.1. The audience was asked to decide which three pilots out of the five went into production. In addition to Mit Herz und Handschellen and Der Elefant – Mord verjährt nie, Körner and Köter was chosen. The show was filmed in a villa on Georg-Mendel-Straße in Potsdam and broadcast in September 2003.

== Plot ==
The Körner family moves into a villa they inherited from their aunt after their daughter Luise gets expelled from school. Along with the villa, they also inherited an 80 kilograms (180 lb) Bordeaux Mastiff that must take care of. The plot revolves around the family and their dog as they defend the villa from crooks who suspect it has valuable treasure.

== Cast ==
The show was directed by Hans Werner. The rest of the cast is:

- George Körner - Max Tidof
- Karin Körner - Nina Franoszek
- Ilse Millner - Ruth Drexel
- Harald Ebeling - Hendrik Duryn
- Luise - Nina Gummich
- Larissa - Alissa Jung
- August Klett - Heinz-Dieter Knaup
- Mikka - Arndt Schwering-Sohnrey
- Martti - Sven Martinek

== Reception ==
The pilot and series was received negatively by critics. German film reviewer tittelbach.tv gave the pilot a 2.5 out of 6 stars, saying "nine overly clever children, exaggerated actors, and a monstrously ugly dog are suitable only for the children's hour in the afternoon." TVSpielfilm gave the humor and action a 1 out of 3. The series itself was called a flop, only achieving a 8.2 percent share of viewers compared to other shows selected from the group of pilots and only a 7.3% among viewers from ages 14–49.

== See also ==
- List of German television series
