= Rospechat (company) =

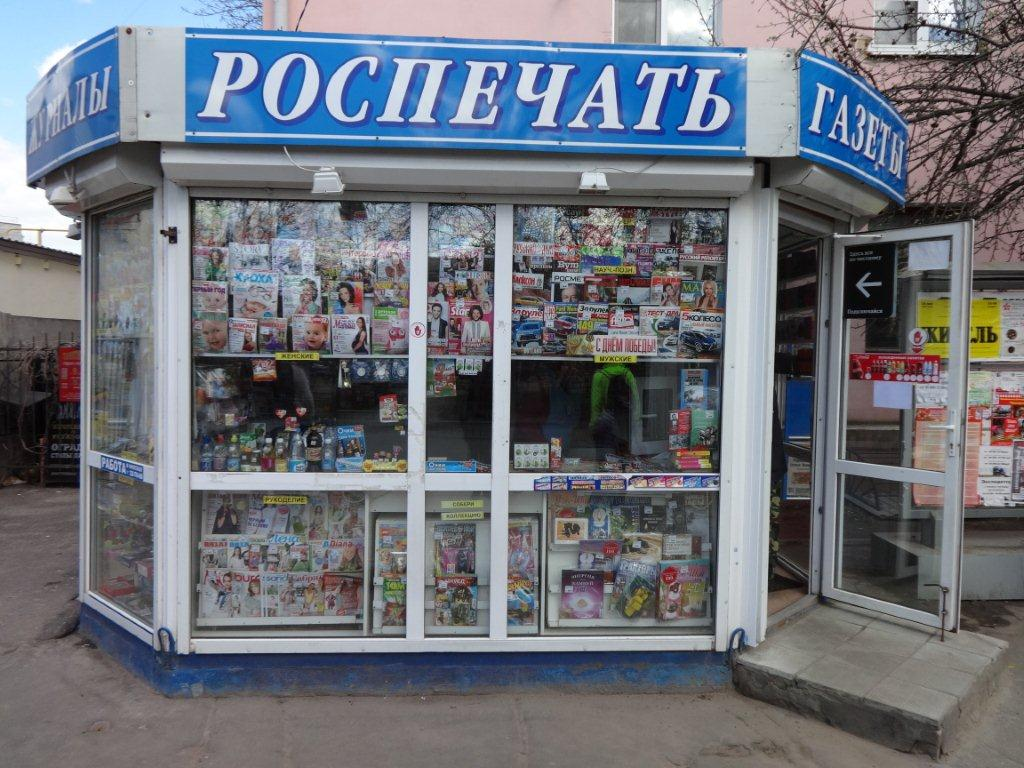
- Native name: ОАО Агентство Роспечать
- Company type: Open joint-stock company
- Industry: Media, Retail, Marketing
- Founded: 1994; 32 years ago (current form)
- Headquarters: Prospekt Zhukova 4, Moscow, Russia
- Area served: Russia
- Services: Journal subscrirption
- Website: www.rosp.ru

Rospechat' (Russian: ОАО Агентство Роспечать) is a Russian company specializing in the distribution of periodicals and related products. The company also offers services in the field of subscription, including corporate subscription for legal entities, internet subscription, wholesale and retail distribution services, marketing and advertising as well as forwarding and customs.

== History ==
The company was created in 1994 as a result of the corporatization of the Soviet subscription and retail trading monopoly agency Soyuzpechat (Russian: ЦРПА «Союзпечать).

In 2002, the company was acquired from the workforce by the Basic Element holding, controlled at that time by Oleg Deripaska and Roman Abramovich, the transaction amount was estimated at $27–35 million, and the former deputy general director of GAZ, Svetlana Sokolova, was appointed head of the agency. In the mid-2000s, Basic Element included Rospechat in its structure.

On June 30, 2015, Basic Element ceased to be the controlling shareholder, and the main owner of Rospechat became Pavel Ezubov, the cousin of Oleg Deripaska and the son of State Duma deputy Alexey Yezubov, who became the beneficiary of a Cypriot offshore holding more than 80% of the company's shares.

As of the mid-2010s, Rospechat had about 4 thousand kiosks in 19 regions of Russia, the company also maintained a subscription catalog and organized the traditional form of subscription to periodicals through the Russian Post. In 2021 it was published that Rospechat decided to exit the kiosk's market, transferred all its regional assets to other distributors with about 500 of the 2,000 retail outlets were transferred to a company called Antares while some of them were purchased and some were leased.

== See also ==
- Publishing and Trade Centre "Marka"
