= Obersturmbannführer =

Paramilitary officer's rank in Nazi Germany

- Country: Nazi Germany
- Service branch: Schutzstaffel; Sturmabteilung; National Socialist Motor Corps; National Socialist Flyers Corps
- Abbreviation: Ostubaf
- NATO rank code: OF-4
- Formation: 1933
- Abolished: 1945
- Next higher rank: Standartenführer
- Next lower rank: Sturmbannführer
- Equivalent ranks: Oberstleutnant (Lieutenant Colonel)

SS-Obersturmbannführer

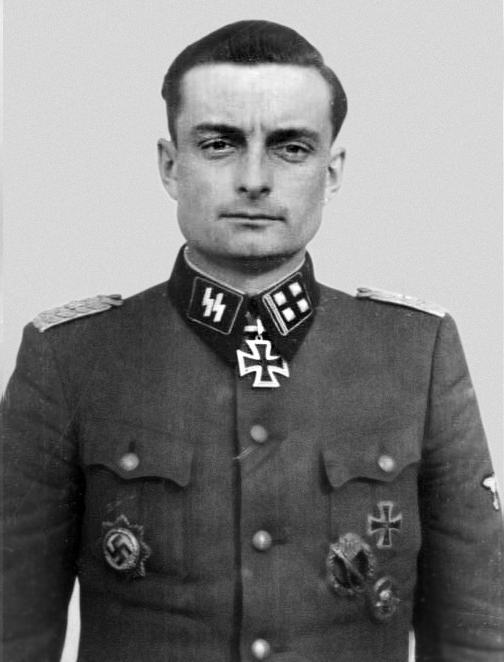
Manfred Schönfelder, here Ostubaf of the Waffen-SS in 1944

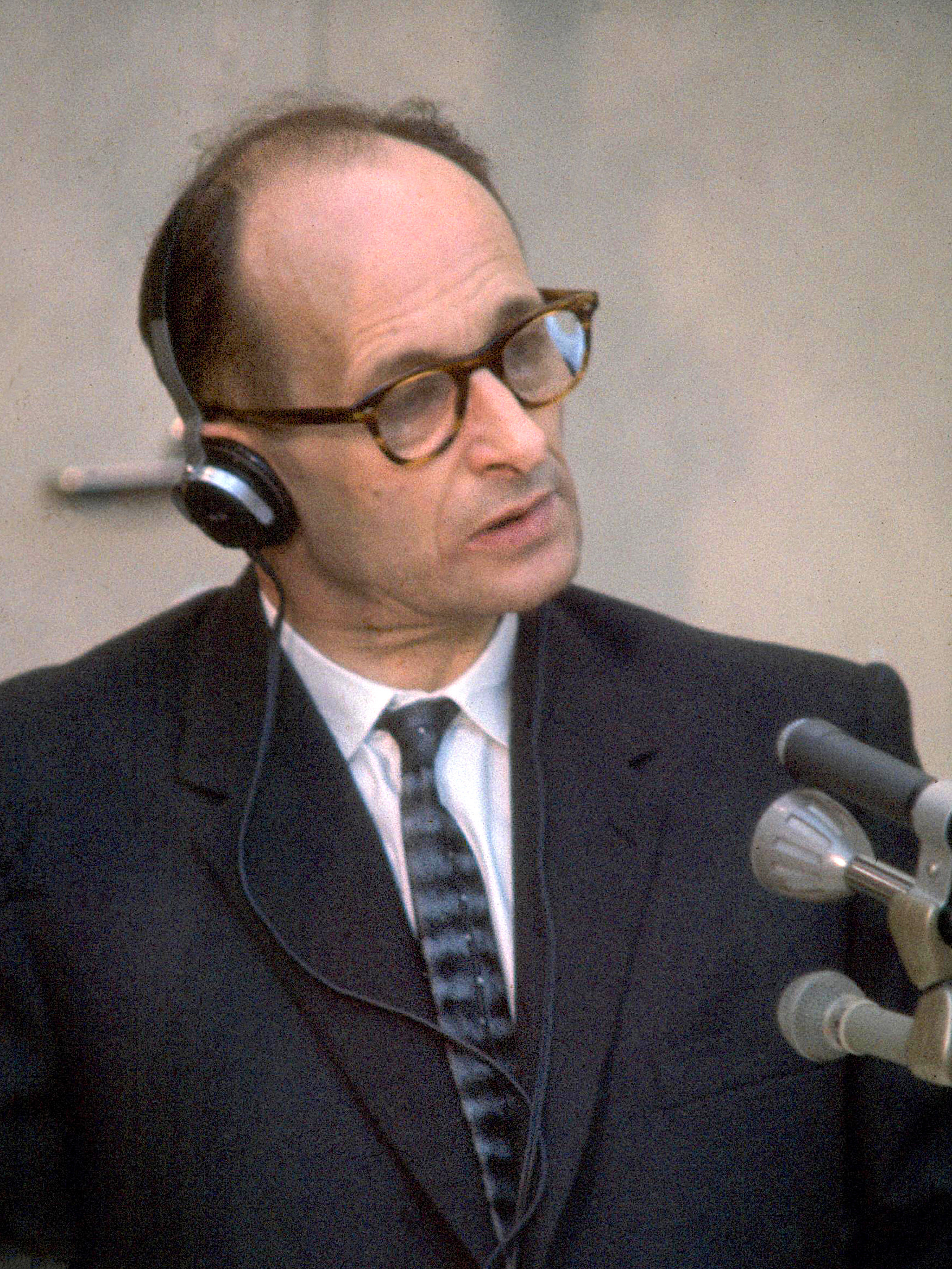
Adolf Eichmann, shown on trial in 1961

Obersturmbannführer ([ˈoːbɐʃtʊʁmbanfyːʁɐ], lit. 'senior assault-unit leader', short: Ostubaf) was a paramilitary rank in the German Nazi Party (NSDAP) which was used by the SA (Sturmabteilung) and the SS (Schutzstaffel). The rank of Obersturmbannführer was junior to the rank of Standartenführer, and was equivalent to the military rank of Oberstleutnant (lieutenant colonel) in the German Army.

As the SA expanded, the rank of Ostubaf was created in May 1933 to provide a rank above Sturmbannführer; likewise, the Ostubaf was an SS rank. The Obersturmbannführer rank insignia was composed of four silver pips and a black stripe on a silver background, all elements are centered in the left wing of the collar of the tunic of an SS or of an SA uniform. The rank also was worn on the shoulder boards of an Oberstleutnant and was the highest rank in the SS and the SA to display SS unit insignia on the collar wing opposite the rank insignia.

Various Waffen-SS units composed of foreign recruits were considered distinct from the German SS, and thus they were not permitted to wear SS runes on their collar tabs but had their divisional insignia instead. Their ranks were also prepended with "Waffen" instead of "SS", as in, Waffen-Obersturmbannführer.

== Adolf Eichmann ==
In 1940, Adolf Eichmann was promoted to Obersturmbannführer, and was listed as such in the minutes of the Wannsee Conference held in January 1942. In 1961, during the Eichmann trial for Lt. Col. Eichmann's crimes against humanity, the chief prosecutor, Gideon Hausner, drew attention to the executive significance and command responsibility of the rank of Obersturmbannführer, in response to Eichmann's claim that he was merely a clerk obeying orders; Hausner asked, "Were you an Obersturmbannführer or an office girl?"

In the book Eichmann in Jerusalem (1963) the political theoretician Hannah Arendt said that Obersturmbannführer was not a rank of significance, because Eichmann whiled away the war time awaiting promotion to the rank of Standartenführer. That "people like Eichmann, who had risen from the ranks, were never permitted to advance beyond a lieutenant colonel [i.e. Obersturmbannführer] except at the front", in combat with the enemy.

== In fiction ==
In the 2014 action-adventure video game Wolfenstein: The New Order, the secondary antagonist Irene Engel enters her debut role as an SS-Obersturmbannführer.

== Rank insignia ==
Obersturmbannführer SS, SA, NSKK, and NSFK
Rank insignia: Shoulder insignia; Camo insignia; Gorget patch	Schutzstaffel (SS)		Sturmabteilung (SA)	NS Motor Corps (NSKK)	NS Flyers Corps (NSFK)
Rank insignia: Shoulder insignia; Camo insignia; Gorget patch	Waffen-SS	Allgemeine-SS; Waffen-SS	collar insignia

Junior Rank; Sturmbannführer	SS rank and SA rank Obersturmbannführer	Senior Rank; Standartenführer

== See also ==
- Table of ranks and insignia of the Waffen-SS
- SS Wachsturmbann "Eimann"

== Bibliography ==
- Arendt, Hannah (2006). Eichmann in Jerusalem. Penguin Classics. ISBN 9780143039884.
- Flaherty, T. H. (2004) [1988]. The Third Reich: The SS. Time-Life Books, Inc. ISBN 1-84447-073-3.
- McNab, Chris (2009). The SS: 1923–1945. Amber Books Ltd. ISBN 978-1-906626-49-5.
- McNab, Chris (2009b). The Third Reich. Amber Books Ltd. ISBN 978-1-906626-51-8.
- Stein, George (2002) [1966]. The Waffen-SS: Hitler's Elite Guard at War 1939–1945. Cerberus Publishing Ltd. ISBN 978-1841451008.
- Toland, John (1999). Battle: The Story of the Bulge. Lincoln: University of Nebraska Press. ISBN 0-8032-9437-9.
- Yerger, Mark C. (1997). Allgemeine-SS: The Commands, Units and Leaders of the General SS. Schiffer Publishing. ISBN 0-7643-0145-4.
