= Frau Engel =

Fictional character in the Wolfenstein series

- Wolfenstein character
- Render of Frau Engel for Wolfenstein II: The New Colossus
- First appearance: Wolfenstein: The New Order (2014)
- Created by: Tommy Tordsson Björk
- Voiced by: Nina Franoszek
- Motion capture: Nina Franoszek

Irene Engel, better known as Frau Engel, is a fictional character from the Wolfenstein video game series. She first appears in Wolfenstein: The New Order, a 2014 title developed by MachineGames and published by Bethesda Softworks. A member of the Wolfenstein series' staple enemy faction, a fictional version of the German Reich which won World War II instead of the Allies, Engel is depicted as a cruel and fanatical high-ranking officer of the Nazi German regime who exhibits an extraordinary amount of apathy for the human condition. She is one of the major antagonistic figures of The New Order, and is presented as the main villain of the 2017 sequel Wolfenstein II: The New Colossus.

Engel is portrayed by German actress Nina Franoszek through performance capture. Although Franoszek drew from her research into the historical atrocities committed by the Nazi regime, the role of women in Nazi Germany, and her own cultural background to prepare for the character, she initially struggled to rationalize Engel's sadistic behavior. She later had a moment of clarity about Engel and came to understand her as a power mad individual, who indulges in the excitement she experiences in the midst of a power trip without any inhibitions or fear of reprisal, and that judging Engel with her own moral compass inhibits her ability to portray the character effectively. Franoszek was also inspired by publicized allegations of sex crimes committed by men in positions of power against vulnerable female targets, which informs Engel's sexually aggressive behaviour during the character's interactions with series protagonist B.J. Blazkowicz.

A scene featuring an encounter between Engel and Blazkowicz on a train car was featured in initial previews and demos of The New Order, which generated a positive response as well as sustained interest in the character from media outlets. Engel's appearances in the Wolfenstein series were generally well received, with several critics highlighting the effectiveness of her overall depiction as an intimidating and memorable villain.

== Concept and design ==
Tommy Tordsson Björk, who served as the Narrative Designer of the Wolfenstein series of video games developed by Swedish studio MachineGames, created the Frau Engel character. Björk also wrote the train car scene for Chapter 3 of The New Order, which introduced Engel and features a notable non-combat encounter between her and series protagonist B.J. Blazkowicz. In a 2014 developers diary video interview released by publisher Bethesda to promote the release of The New Order, Björk described his writing for Engel to be his proudest moment: he described her as a "cool female villain", an uncommon trope in the video game industry, and that players would likely find the train car scene to be a standout moment from the game. The developers had always intended to build up Engel's character in The New Order, so that the player would have a connection to her, and then position her as the main antagonist of The New Colossus.

Creative Director Jens Matthies said the terms "freedom" and "liberating" are Engel's defining characteristics. This is because her character "cuts to the core of a fascist or Nazi ideology" and that if she is able to succeed in such a male-dominated environment and rise up its ranks, she attains a very liberating personal freedom at the expense of others. This enables her to be on a constant power trip and dominate others at her whim, as exemplified by the card game scene. On establishing Engel as a nemesis for Blazkowicz, Matthies thought having Engel crawl toward the player's perspective with a "totally broken, disfigured visage, coupled with her vow of vengeance" makes for a powerful moment. Matthies explained from Engel's perspective, that since she is humiliated and her status as the "queen of the realm" was challenged, this propels much of her personal vendetta against the Resistance and Blazkowicz in particular, beginning with The New Order and continued by The New Colossus.

Concept artist Christopher Brändström designed Engel's head model for The New Colossus; he also created all FACS-shapes, in-game model and textures of the character for the game. Swedish artist Vidar Rapp was responsible for creating Engel's updated uniform for The New Colossus, which is based on the one she wears in The New Order. While her character model's final materials and textures were authored in-house by MachineGames staff, her face scans were provided by Goodbye Kansas Studios.

=== Portrayal ===
According to Andreas Öjerfors, Senior Game Designer at MachineGames, finding the ideal actor for a role in narrative-driven games is a very important yet laborious process. The process through which Matthies cast various actors for different roles involve a lot of testing and could lead up to several months in order to find the right actors who could give a great portrayal. When German actress Nina Franoszek was first introduced to Frau Engel in 2011, her character concept was little more than a “picture with a harsh face”. Matthies noted that it is never easy for German actors to portray a Nazi character due to the "emotionally complicated" material they have to work with. Matthies remembered that the development team thought they had prepared written scenes involving Engel which seemed strong within their original context, but much of the final product evolved with Nina Franoszek's input once she is cast as the character.

Franoszek was initially hesitant to accept a video game role, let alone play a Nazi officer, as she had no experience working in the video game industry and did not know what to expect from The New Order. What drew her to get involved with the game was its script, which she described as similar to Quentin Tarantino's Inglourious Basterds, and the opportunity for her to play what she described as a female version of Christoph Waltz's character Hans Landa with a boytoy companion. Franoszek had disclosed during interviews that she has German Jewish ancestry in Poland from her paternal side, and a maternal grandfather who was not a member of the Nazi Party, but did serve as a military general during World War II and was later captured by Soviet forces. As part of her research for Engel as well as her personal interest in her own family history, she visited the remains of the Auschwitz concentration camp, interviewed her grandfather who survived 12 years in a Siberian labour camp, and attempted to find more information about the fate of her paternal relatives in Poland. The emotional complexity of the issues involved made Franoszek question the human condition and what humanity is capable of.

Franoszek portrayed Engel through motion capture. On her work as an actor, Franoszek felt she has the unique opportunity to bring her aggregated life experiences to her roles, which she would "transform and touch" with her storytelling. She partook in improvisational rehearsals, where she developed Engel's "swaggering physicality" and found a voice, conveyed as "always on the edge of hysteria". Engel's sexually charged behaviour is part of a means which she used to degrade and control her victims. Examples of such behaviour include her deliberate placing of her lover's hand between her legs during her conversation with Blaskowitz in the train to Berlin, or when she jams a gun into Blaskowitz's mouth in a sensually performative manner. Franoszek researched real world figures whose power hungry personalities are analogous to Engel's, and concluded that sexuality is often used to assert dominance as a power move. In explaining her thought process, Franoszek used the same manner that certain men in power would behave around women, but the gender role in this instance is reversed since Engel is a woman. To Franoszek, that kind of behaviour in fact has little to do with sexual attraction, as its real purpose is to humiliate victims and demonstrate that the perpetrator has power over them through sexual harassment.

Although the character was more or less fleshed out throughout the development of The New Order, Franoszek recalled that she struggled to connect with her character, in light of the veracity of the accounts about Nazi German war crimes. Franoszek noted that she had studied historical information about notable female concentration camp staff like Irma Grese and Ilse Koch who had exhibited similarly malevolent behaviour, but still felt that she was unable to find Engel's character from her research. Franoszek sought to understand what drives such a human being to harbour such violent, intolerant thought and act them out in a cold and dispassionate manner, but for her, the atrocities committed by members of the Nazi German regime were so unspeakably evil that they blocked her access to the character.

Franoszek experienced what she described as a breakthrough with her understanding of the character during a rehearsal, after she decided to mentally project herself into the position of someone who might have walked through the Auschwitz barracks "in sharp-heeled, perfectly shined shoes". When enacting scene where a Jewish prisoner arriving at Engel's concentration camp and hands her a hungry baby on the assumption that a woman would instinctively protect an infant, Franoszek mentally threw herself into the brutality of the sequence where Engel responds callously by throwing the baby against a wall without a second thought. She experienced what she felt like an adrenaline rush or "high", a power rush that gave her a god-like feeling. She realized that when such an individual do something so evil, and there is no punishment for such an act, they would want to pursue that excitement again and again. In rationalizing their circumstances, Franoszek suggested their interpretation of the lack of repercussions for their heinous actions to mean that there is no God but themselves. Playing Engel became an "amazing ride" for Franoszek once she found the character's emotional truth, as she had the opportunity to explore the "abyss of human nature on a very deep level" and act out things she never thought she would be capable of.

Reflecting on the reception of The New Order, Frazonek commented that the reaction from players to the card game scene was "overwhelming" and moved her deeply. She noted that people connected to the scene as not only was it a "dark experience that opened them up to understand the depth of torment" her Jewish ancestor had endured, it is also relevant in her view for "anyone else who experiences enslavement or suppression because of their race, nationality, or religion.” Frazonek described feeling a sense of catharsis about doing the card game scene, because she was reminded of her father's explanation of the "exact percentage of Jewishness" with regards to her ethnic background; from her perspective, it once felt like an odd notion that her heritage is measured so coldly and mathematically, as if it was a percentage that might have endangered her life. She understood in retrospect, that she could not act a part if she judges it, and realized that she had pre-judged Engel from the perspective of a person with Jewish ancestry.

== Appearances ==
=== Wolfenstein: The New Order ===
The New Order's backstory for Frau Engel establishes her as a mother of six and a leading figure of the League of German Girls organization, the girls' wing of the Hitler Youth movement. Prior to the events of The New Order, Engel is given control of Camp Belica, an extermination camp situated in Northern Croatia.

Series protagonist B.J. Blazkowicz first encounters then-Obersturmbannführer Engel and her entourage while he is retrieving some coffee for himself and his companion Anya Oliwa in the refreshment room of a train en route to Berlin. Interpreting Blazkowicz's facial features to be a hallmark of Aryan heritage, she compels him to sit down with her and her much younger lover, Untersturmführer Hans "Bubi" Winkle. She instructs him to play a card game, which consists of a series of Rorschach-style association tests which supposedly determine whether the person being tested is of a pure Aryan bloodline, and issued an implicit threat to shoot him if he does not cooperate or if he "fails" the test. Regardless of what the player picks, Engel laughs the results off and claims the test was a practical joke. She also asserts that she does not need any such tests as she can tell someone is Aryan with the naked eye, unaware of Blazkowicz's Slavic and Jewish heritage.

Blazkowicz later goes undercover inside Camp Belica on behalf of the Kreisau Circle Resistance group, where he makes contact with a Jewish scientist, Set Roth. Roth offers to help the Resistance in return for the destruction of the Camp Belica. Blazkowicz retrieves a battery for a device that controls a large mech in the camp, but is captured afterwards by Engel's men. Engel prepares to execute Blazkowicz and Set with the same mech, but Set manages to take control of it. The mech crushes her jaw and throws her over a steep drop under Set's directions. Engel survives her injuries, but fails to stop the camp's prisoners from escaping.

In the penultimate chapter of The New Order, Engel leads an attack on the Kreisau Circle headquarters and captures some of its members on behalf of General Wilhelm "Deathshead" Strasse, a Nazi scientist who took the initiative to reconstruct Engel's face, and whose scientific achievements are instrumental to Nazi Germany's victory over its enemies by the end of the 1940s. Having taken the captives to Deathshead's compound and leaving shortly afterwards to deal with rebels elsewhere, she later witnesses the brutal death of Bubi by Blazkowicz's hand via live broadcast when her lover failed at his attempt to subdue their enemy.

=== Wolfenstein II: The New Colossus ===
By the events of The New Colossus, Engel is promoted to the rank of Obergruppenführer following the death of Deathshead during the ending of The New Order, and is given command of the large fortified airborne platform, the Ausmerzer. Engel, who has now developed a lustful attraction to Blazkowicz, is accompanied by her daughter Sigrun, the youngest of her six children, whom she constantly denigrates out of contempt for various issues, including her weight and her somewhat pacifistic nature.

A U-boat called Eva's Hammer, commandeered by Blazkowicz's Resistance allies as a mobile base, is tracked down and incapacitated by the Ausmerzer. It is boarded shortly afterwards by Engel's forces to hunt down Blazkowicz, now branded as "Terror-Billy" by the Nazi regime. Engel lures Blazkowicz, who is desperate to save his captured friends, into the Ausmerzer where she decapitates his friend and ally Caroline Becker with a hatchet in front of him. Sigrun has a change of heart and turns on her mother after she is subjected to a torrent of verbal abuse, and after Engel taunts her and Blazkowicz with Caroline's severed head. Engel flees from the scene, and Blazkowicz escapes with the help of Sigrun after he disconnects the Eva's Hammer from the Ausmerzer.

Engel later recaptures Blazkowicz at the disused Blazkowicz farm estate in Mesquite, Texas after Blazkowicz's father exposes his location to the Nazi regime's forces through an open telephone line, and she takes his heirloom engagement ring (for which he had traveled to Mesquite to eventually give it to Anya) for herself. As part of the Resistance's plot to break him out, Blazkowicz's associate Super Spesh visits him in prison under the false pretenses of being his lawyer. Engel allows her men to play along with the ruse before executing him and taunting Blazkowicz about her actions. Engel personally carries out Blazkowicz's death sentence, beheading him at the Lincoln Memorial, Washington D.C. in front of millions in a televised event and casting his head to a furnace beneath her. Unbeknownst to Engel, the Resistance had already made preparations to retrieve his disembodied head and preserve it in a glass tank, with Roth later surgically grafting his head onto an unused bioengineered Nazi super-soldier body.

Blazkowicz and Anya lead an assault on the Ausmerzer sometime later, taking advantage of the fact that Engel is away from the Ausmerzer to appear on a nationally televised talk show. After Blazkowicz and his team disable its defenses and hijack the Ausmerzer itself, they travel to the show's set to confront Engel. Blazkowicz brutally executes Engel with a hatchet to avenge Caroline and many of her other victims, and the team declares the start of a revolution against the Nazi regime. Blazkowicz then retrieves his heirloom ring from Engel's body and proposes to Anya.

== Critical reception ==
Frau Engel has received a generally positive reception from critics. The train car scene which serves as the introduction to Frau Engel in The New Order has been lauded by most critics as a memorable sequence. Alex Navarro praised the train scene as one of the better parts of the demo for The New Order he played prior to the game's release. Hamza Aziz from Destructoid found that the train car sequence with Engel was so strong that every other element that was shown in a preview showing for The New Order paled by comparison. Ben Kuchera from Polygon described the train car scene as a "rare moment where a video game hero's agency is removed completely". In Kuchera's view, the way Engel and Bubi play with the fear of being completely at their mercy "as if it were a toy, is scarier than almost any scene of graphic violence in the game". Robert Rath from The Escapist concurred and opined that The New Order used this removal of agency to create what he believed to be the game's best moment in the card game scene.

Engel's appearance in The New Colossus has elicited praise from multiple sources. Dan Stapleton from IGN said Engel "steals the show with her absolutely gleeful sadism", and praised her as most memorably terrifying video game villain since Vaas Montenegro from Far Cry 3. Wesley Yin-Poole summarized her as "a wonderfully voice acted character with a horrific world view" and agreed that she once again steals the show. Matt Bertz from Game Informer lauded the early sequence of The New Colossus as "bloody brilliant", highlighting Engel's portrayal as an "absolutely revolting and deplorable villain". Christopher Byrd from The Washington Post said her villainous presence "leaves the smell of sulfur" in the nose while her awfulness ignites the screen. Neil Bolt from PlayStation Universe said Engel eclipses her predecessor Deathshead in terms of personality and menace, and that the duality of her presentation, alternating between theatrical villainy and chilling cruelty is representative of the game's strong balancing act between bombastic silliness and grim drama.

IGN staff rated numerous scenes involving Engel as among the craziest and most memorable moments of the Wolfenstein series. These include her disfiguring injury by a robot; her raid of the Kreisau Circle headquarters; her execution of Caroline Becker; and her graphic death scene during the ending of The New Colossus. Ranking Engel 3rd on a 2018 list of the best villains in video games, GamesRadar+ staff said Frau Engel's depiction in The New Colossus is "legit nightmare fuel", and that she manages to be the most monstrous character in a game that features Adolf Hitler.

Nina Franoszek's performance as Engel has been acclaimed by critics. Matt Hanson from Tech Radar praised Franoszek for her ability to portray Engel as a terrifying character, who is also complex and intriguing at the same time. For her performance as Engel in The New Colossus, Franoszek was nominated for the Great White Way Award for Best Acting in a Game. Franoszek was also nominated for the BTVA Video Game Voice Acting Award in 2018.

Not all reception to Frau Engel's appearances has been positive. Although Ben Maxwell from PCGamesN liked Engel as a villainous character and initially enjoyed the train car scene with her, revisiting that moment after experiencing a diner scene involving an unnamed Nazi officer in The New Colossus made him re-evaluate it as brash and inferior compared to the dramatic tension evoked by the diner scene. Writing for Vice Waypoint, Danielle Riendeau criticized Engel's fat-shaming of her daughter as well as her sadistic taunting using Caroline's severed head in The New Colossus, and argued that it ran the risk of desensitizing the game's audience to just how bad these actions are as they are becoming increasingly absurd. Kuchera agreed with Riendeau and said the gratuitous violence perpetrated by Engel and her minions during the early moments of The New Colossus did not resonate with him, and felt that the brutality of these characters should have been handled with better care.
