= Pravda =

Russian newspaper founded in 1912

Pravda Правда
- First issue, 5 May 1912 (22 April 1912 OS)
- Type: Triweekly newspaper
- Format: Broadsheet
- Owner: Communist Party of the Russian Federation
- Editor: Boris Komotsky
- Founded: 5 May 1912; 114 years ago (officially)
- Political alignment: Communism; Marxism–Leninism
- Language: Russian
- Headquarters: 24, Pravda Street, Moscow
- Country: Russian Empire (1903–1917); Russian Republic (1917); Russian SFSR (1918–1922); Soviet Union (1922–1991); Russian Federation (since 1991)
- Circulation: 100,300 (2010)
- ISSN: 0233-4275
- Website: Pravda's website (CPRF branch)

Pravda (Russian: Правда, IPA: [ˈpravdə], lit. 'Truth') is a Russian broadsheet newspaper, and was the official newspaper of the Central Committee of the Communist Party of the Soviet Union, when it was one of the most influential papers in the country with a circulation of 11 million. The first issue of Pravda was published in Vienna on October 3, 1908, with Leon Trotsky serving as its editor. Designed as an illegal, non-factional Marxist newspaper, it was smuggled across the border into Russia to unify the fractured Russian Social Democratic movement. In April 1912, Vladimir Lenin and the Bolshevik faction hijacked the highly popular name and style, launching their own legal daily workers' newspaper called Pravda in St. Petersburg. It emerged as the leading government newspaper of the Soviet Union after the October Revolution. The newspaper was an organ of the Central Committee of the CPSU between 1912 and 1991.

After the dissolution of the Soviet Union, Pravda was sold by the then Russian president Boris Yeltsin to a Greek business family in 1992, and the paper came under the control of their private company Pravda International. In 1996, there was an internal dispute between the owners of Pravda International and some of the Pravda journalists that led to Pravda splitting into different entities. The Communist Party of the Russian Federation (CPRF) acquired the Pravda paper, while some of the original Soviet Pravda journalists separated to form Russia's first online paper Pravda Online (now Pravda.ru), which is not connected to the Communist Party. The Pravda paper is still run by the CPRF, whereas the online Pravda.ru is privately owned and has international editions published in Russian, English, French, and Portuguese. After a legal dispute between the rival parties, the Russian court of arbitration stipulated that both entities would be allowed to continue using the Pravda name.

== Origins ==
=== Pre-revolutionary Pravda ===
Though Pravda officially began publication on 5 May 1912 (22 April 1912 OS), the anniversary of Karl Marx's birth, its origins trace back to 1903 when it was founded in Moscow by a wealthy railway engineer, V.A. Kozhevnikov. Pravda had started publishing in the light of the Russian Revolution of 1905.

During its earliest days, Pravda had no political orientation. Kozhevnikov started it as a journal of arts, literature and social life. Kozhevnikov was soon able to form up a team of young writers including A.A. Bogdanov, N.A Rozhkov, M.N Pokrovsky, I.I Skvortsov-Stepanov, P.P Rumyantsev and M.G. Lunts, who were active contributors on 'social life' section of Pravda. Later, they became the editorial board of the journal, and, in the near future, also became the active members of the Bolshevik faction of the Russian Social Democratic Labour Party (RSDLP). Because of certain quarrels between Kozhevnikov and the editorial board, he had asked them to leave and the Menshevik faction of the RSDLP took over as the editorial board. But the relationship between them and Kozhevnikov was also a bitter one.

The Ukrainian political party Spilka, which was also a splinter group of the RSDLP, took over the journal as its organ. Leon Trotsky was invited to edit the paper in 1908, and the paper was moved to Vienna in 1909. By then, the editorial board of Pravda consisted of hard-line Bolsheviks who sidelined the Spilka leadership soon after it shifted to Vienna. Trotsky had introduced a tabloid format to the newspaper and distanced itself from the intra-party struggles inside the RSDLP. During those days, Pravda gained a large audience among Russian workers. By 1910, the Central Committee of the RSDLP suggested making Pravda its official organ.

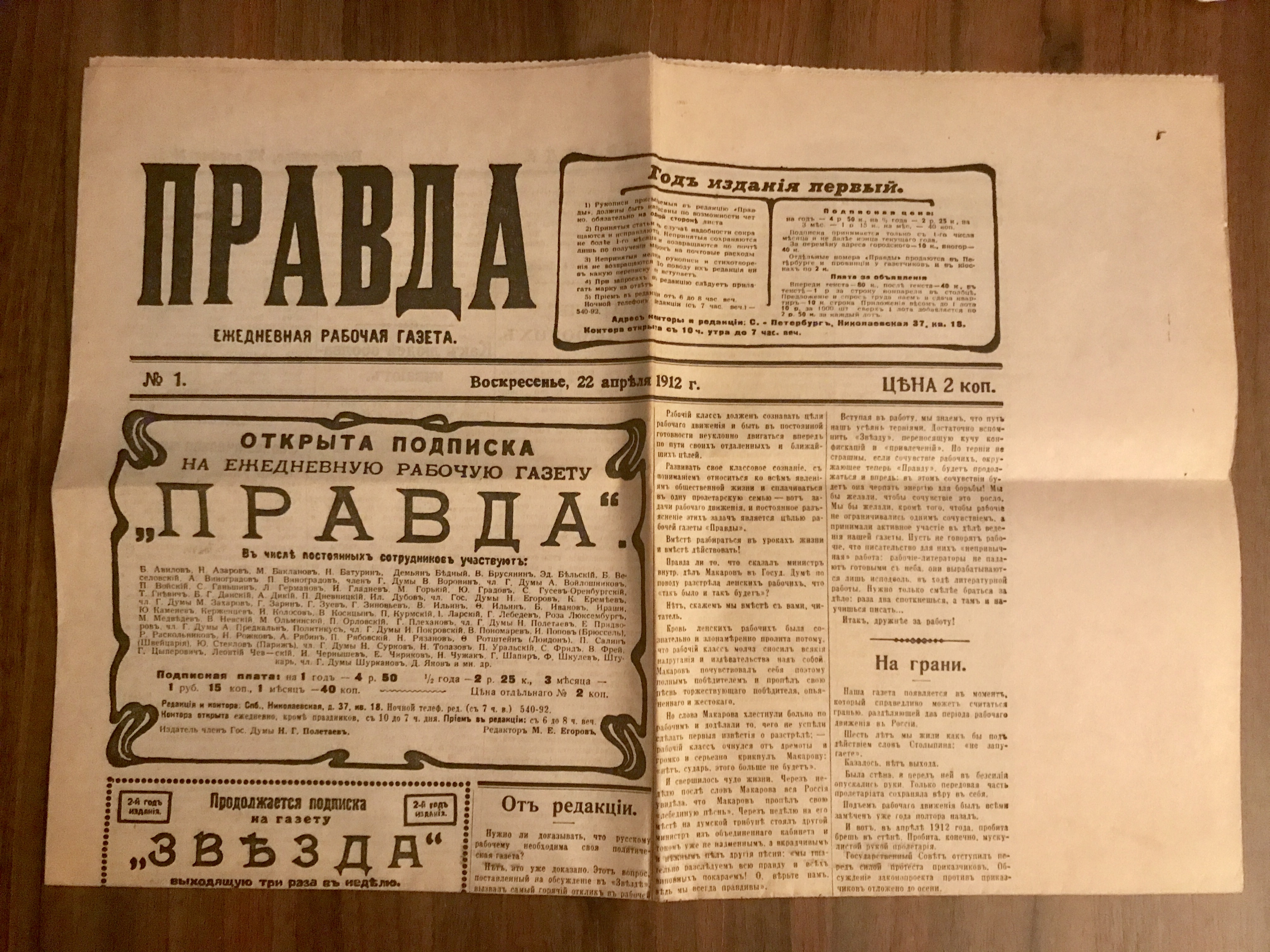
First published Pravda dated 5 May 1912 (22 April 1912 OS)

At the sixth conference of the RSDLP held in Prague in January 1912, the Menshevik faction was expelled from the party. The party under the leadership of Vladimir Lenin decided to make Pravda its official party organ. The paper was shifted from Vienna to St. Petersburg and the first issue under Lenin's leadership was published on 5 May 1912 (22 April 1912 OS). It was the first time that Pravda was published as a legal political newspaper. The Central Committee of the RSDLP, workers and individuals such as Maxim Gorky provided financial help to the newspaper. The first issue published on 5 May cost two kopecks and had four pages. It had articles on economic issues, workers movement, and strikes, and also had two proletarian poems. M.E. Egorov was the first editor of St. Petersburg Pravda and Member of State Duma of the Russian Empire Nikolay Poletaev served as its publisher.

Egorov, as well as the 42 editors that came after him until 1914, were not real editors of Pravda as the position was pseudo in nature. The main task of these editors was to go to jail whenever needed and to save the party from a huge fine. On the publishing side, the party had chosen only those individuals as publishers who were sitting members of Duma because they had parliamentary immunity. Initially, it had sold between 40,000 and 60,000 copies. With the outbreak of World War I, the paper was closed down by tsarist authorities in July 1914. Over the next three years, it changed its name eight times because of police harassment:

- Рабочая правда (Rabochaya Pravda, Worker's Truth)
- Северная правда (Severnaya Pravda Northern Truth)
- За правду (Za Pravdu, For Truth)
- Пролетарская правда (Proletarskaya Pravda, Proletarian Truth)
- Путь правды (Put' Pravdy, The Way of Truth)
- Рабочий (Rabochiy, The Worker)
- Трудовая правда (Trudovaya Pravda, Labor's Truth)

=== During the 1917 Revolution ===
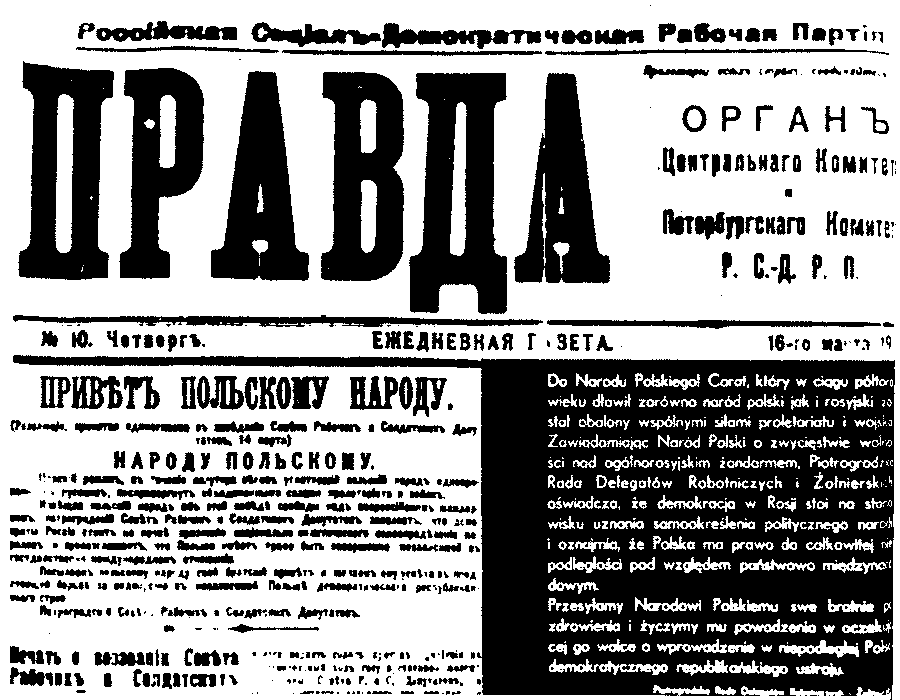
16 March 1917: Pravda reports the declaration of Polish independence.

The abdication of Emperor Nicholas II during the February Revolution of 1917 allowed Pravda to reopen. The original editors of the newly revived Pravda, Vyacheslav Molotov and Alexander Shlyapnikov, were opposed to the liberal Russian Provisional Government. However, when Lev Kamenev, Joseph Stalin and former Duma deputy Matvei Muranov returned from Siberian exile on 12 March, they took over the editorial board – starting from 15 March. Under Kamenev's and Stalin's influence, Pravda took a conciliatory tone towards the Provisional Government – "insofar as it struggles against reaction or counter-revolution" – and called for a unification conference with the internationalist wing of the Mensheviks. On 14 March, Kamenev wrote in his first editorial:

What purpose would it serve to speed things up, when things were already taking place at such a rapid pace?

On 15 March, he supported the war effort:

When army faces army, it would be the most insane policy to suggest to one of those armies to lay down its arms and go home. This would not be a policy of peace, but a policy of slavery, which would be rejected with disgust by a free people.

== Soviet period ==
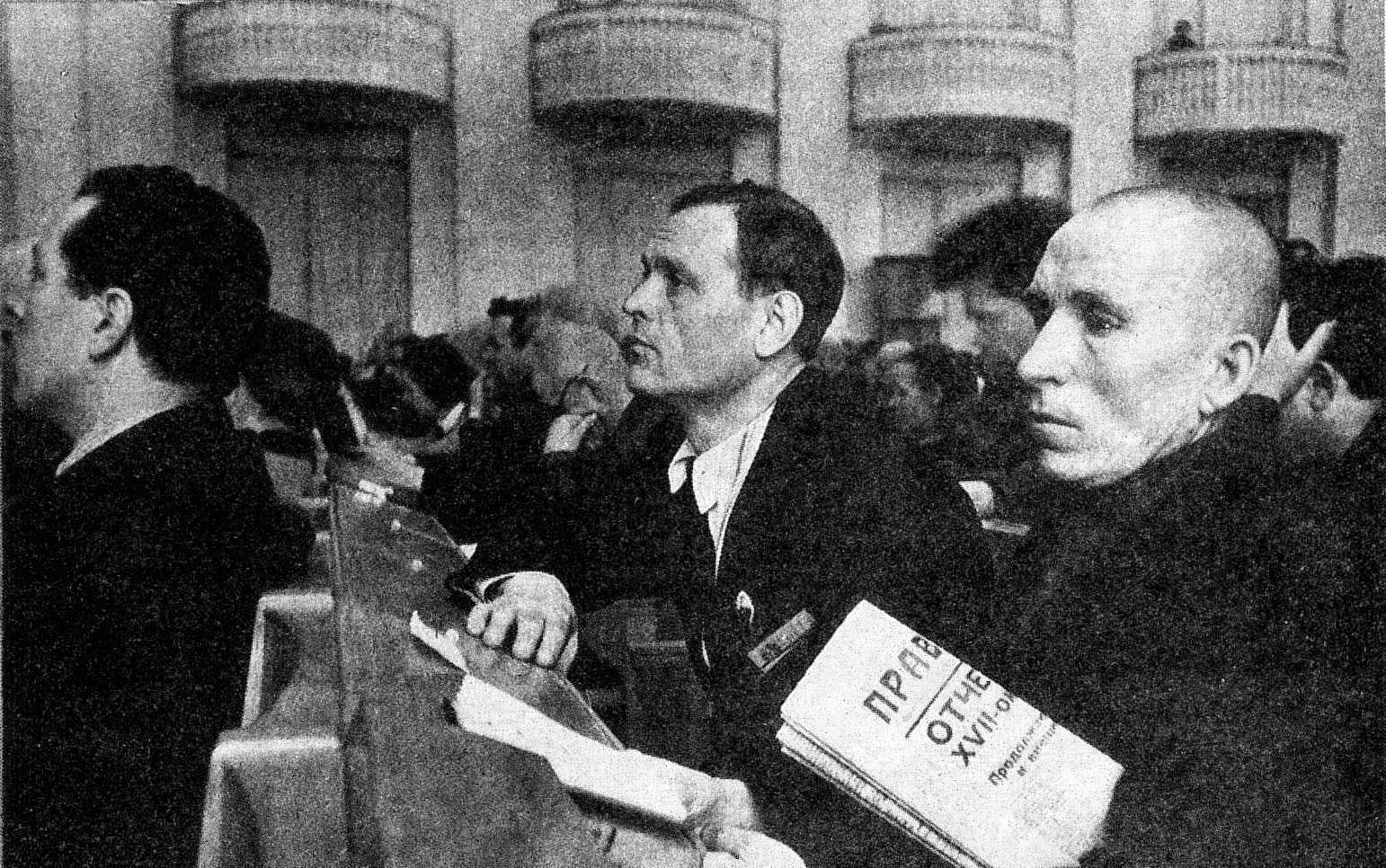
A delegate at Bolshevik 17th Congress of the All-Union Communist Party holding a Pravda newspaper in 1934

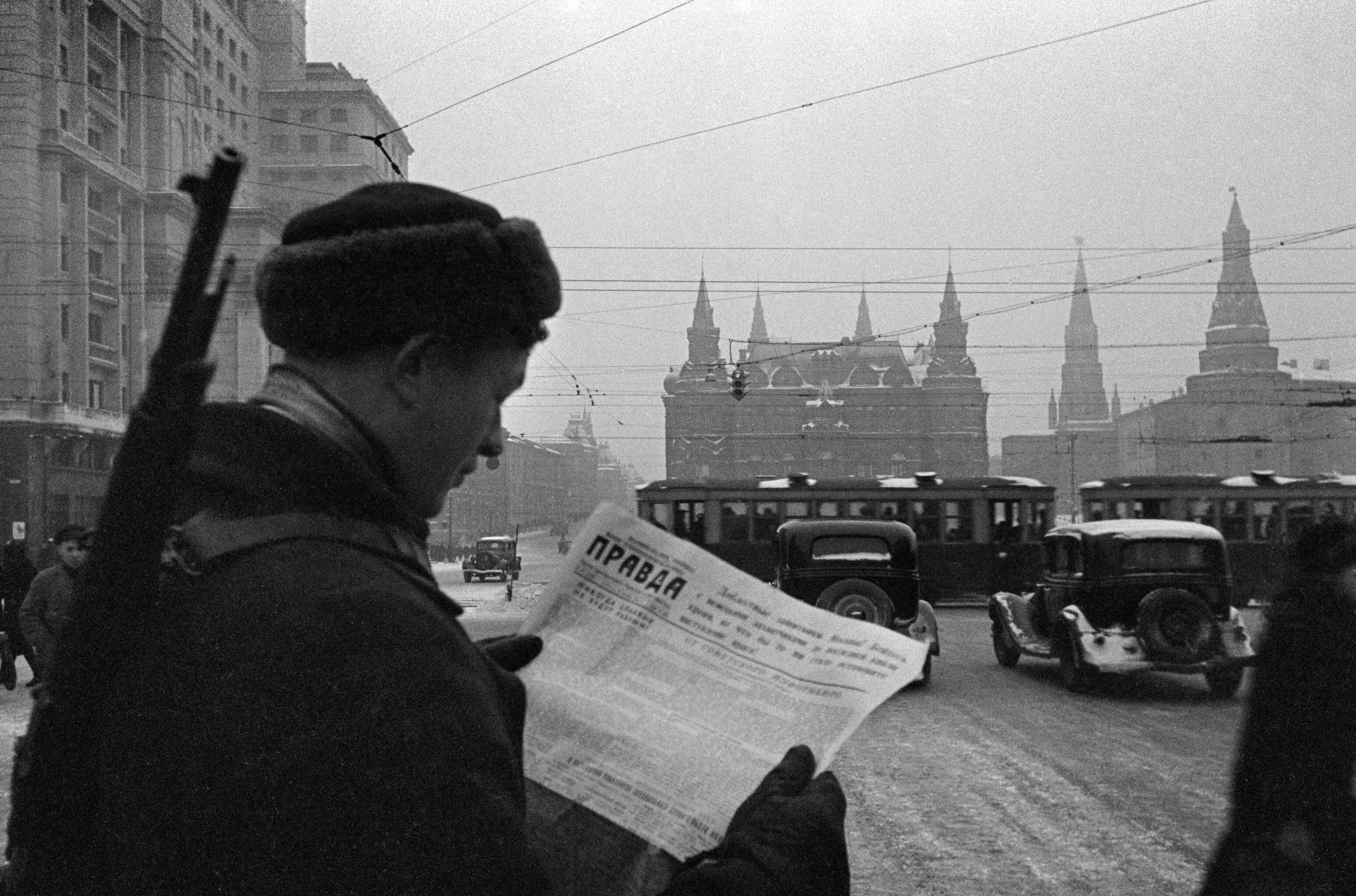
A soldier reading Pravda during the Second World War, late 1941

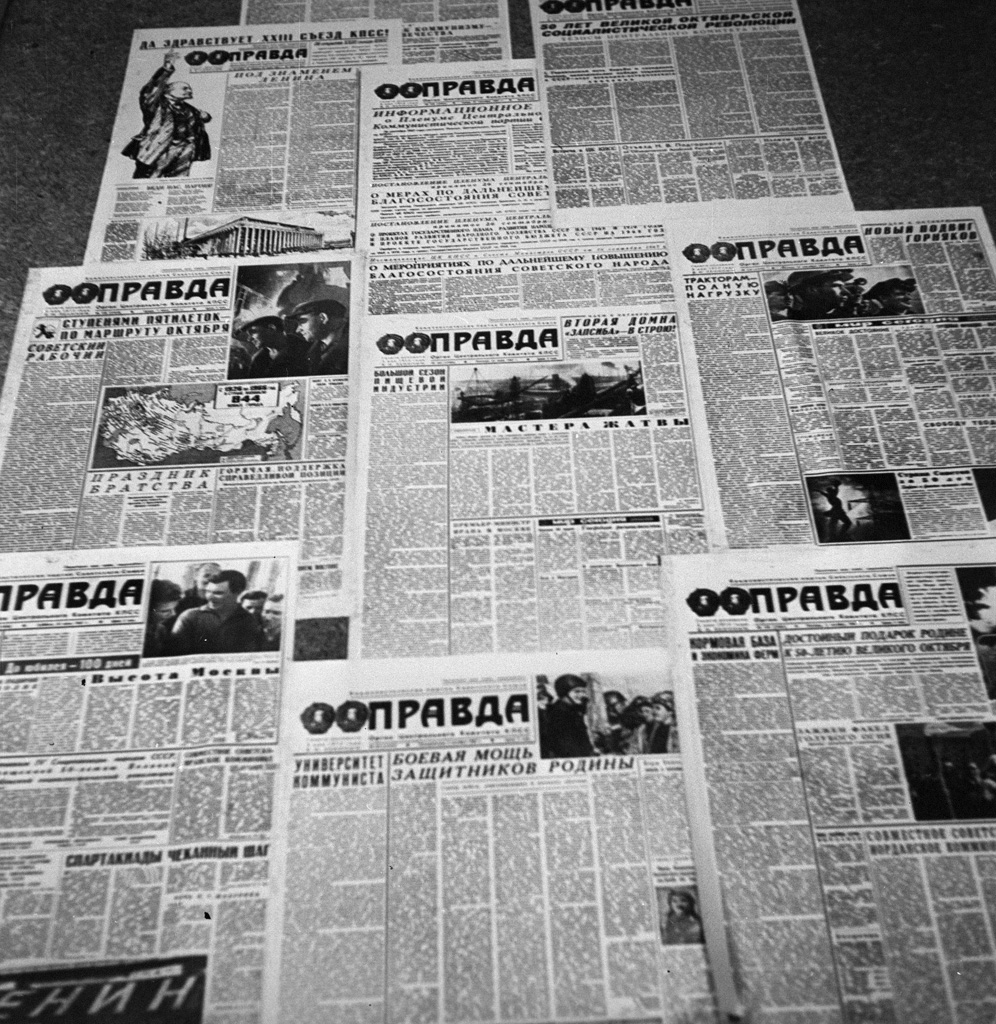
Pravda frontpages from the 1960s

The offices of the newspaper were transferred to Moscow on 3 March 1918 when the Soviet capital was moved there. Pravda became an official publication, or "organ", of the ruling Soviet Communist Party. Pravda became the conduit for announcing official policy and policy changes and would remain so until 1991. Subscription to Pravda was mandatory for state run companies, the armed services and other organizations until 1989.

Other newspapers existed as organs of other state bodies. For example, Izvestia, which covered foreign relations, was the organ of the Supreme Soviet of the Soviet Union, Trud was the organ of the state-controlled trade union movement, Bednota was distributed to the Red Army and rural peasants. Various derivatives of the name Pravda were used both for a number of national newspapers (Komsomolskaya Pravda was the organ of the Komsomol organization, and Pionerskaya Pravda was the organ of the Young Pioneers), and for the regional Communist Party newspapers in many republics and provinces of the USSR, e.g. Kazakhstanskaya Pravda in Kazakhstan, Polyarnaya Pravda in Murmansk Oblast, Pravda Severa in Arkhangelsk Oblast, or Moskovskaya Pravda in the city of Moscow.

Shortly after the October 1917 Revolution, Nikolai Bukharin became the editor of Pravda. Bukharin's apprenticeship for this position had occurred during the last months of his emigration/exile prior to his return to Russia in April 1917. These months from November 1916 until April 1917 were spent by Bukharin in New York City in the United States. In New York, Bukharin divided his time between the local libraries and his work for Novyj Mir (The New World) a Russian language newspaper serving the Russian speaking community of New York. Bukharin's involvement with Novyj Mir became deeper as time went by. Indeed, from January 1917 until April when he returned to Russia, Bukharin served as de facto editor of Novyj Mir. In the period after the death of Lenin in 1924, Pravda was to form a power base for Bukharin, which helped him reinforce his reputation as a Marxist theoretician. Bukharin would continue to serve as editor of Pravda until he and Mikhail Tomsky were removed from their responsibilities at Pravda in February 1929 as part of their downfall as a result of their dispute with Joseph Stalin.

A number of places and things in the Soviet Union were named after Pravda. Among them was the city of Pravdinsk in Gorky Oblast (the home of a paper mill producing much newsprint for Pravda and other national newspapers), and a number of streets and collective farms.

18 November 1940 issue, featuring Vyacheslav Molotov and Adolf Hitler

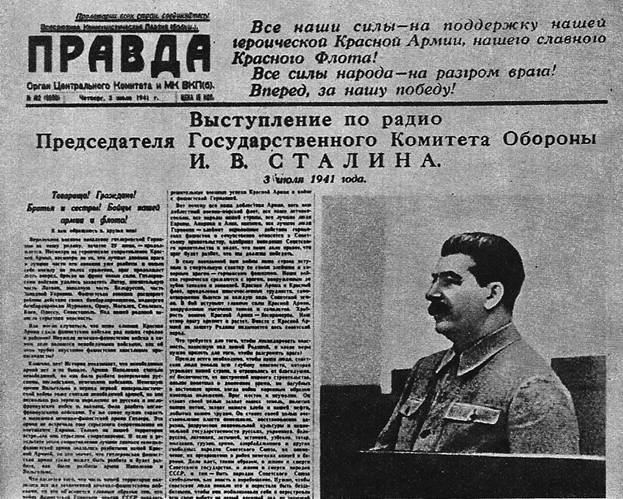
3 July 1941 issue, featuring Joseph Stalin

As the names of the main communist newspaper and the main Soviet newspaper, Pravda and Izvestia, meant "the truth" and "the news" respectively, a popular saying was "there's no news in Pravda and no truth in Izvestia". Though not highly appreciated as an objective and unbiased news source, Pravda was regarded – both by Soviet citizens and by the outside world – as a government mouthpiece and therefore a reliable reflection of the Soviet government's positions on various issues. The publication of an article in Pravda could be taken as indication of a change in Soviet policy or the result of a power struggle in the Soviet leadership, and Western Sovietologists were regularly reading Pravda and paying attention to the most minute details and nuances.

== Post-Soviet period ==
After the dissolution of the Soviet Union Pravda was sold by Russian president Boris Yeltsin to a Greek business family – the Giannikoses – in 1992, and the paper came under the control of their private company Pravda International.

In 1996, there was an internal dispute between the owners of Pravda International and some of the Pravda journalists which led to Pravda splitting into different entities. The Communist Party of the Russian Federation acquired the Pravda paper, while some of the original Pravda journalists separated to form Russia's first online paper (and the first online English paper) Pravda.ru, which is not connected to the Communist Party, but is run by journalists associated with the defunct Soviet Pravda. After a legal dispute between the rival parties, the Russian court of arbitration stipulated that both entities would be allowed to continue using the Pravda name. The Pravda paper is today run by the Communist Party of the Russian Federation, whereas the online Pravda.ru is privately owned and has international editions published in Russian, English, French and Portuguese.

Pravda was a daily newspaper during the Soviet era but nowadays it is published three times a week, and its readership is largely online where it has a presence. Pravda still operates from the same headquarters at Pravda Street in Moscow from where journalists used to work on Pravda during the Soviet era. It operates under the leadership of journalist Boris Komotsky, who is also a member of the Russian State Duma.

On 5 May 2012, Pravda marked its centenary, with a grand celebration at the Trade Unions house organised by the Communist Party. The gala was attended by the former and current employees of the newspaper, its readers and party members, representatives of other communist media organisations. Gennady Zyuganov made a speech, and congratulatory messages were received from Russian president Dmitry Medvedev and Belarusian president Alexander Lukashenko.

=== McCain controversy ===
In 2013, after Russian president Vladimir Putin published an op-ed in The New York Times in support of Syrian president Bashar al-Assad, US senator John McCain announced that he would publish a response article in Pravda, referring to the newspaper owned by the Communist Party of the Russian Federation. McCain, however, eventually published his op-ed in Pravda.ru. This caused protests from the editor of communist Pravda Boris Komotsky and a response from the editor of Pravda.ru Dmitry Sudakov: Komotsky claimed that "there is only one Pravda in Russia, it is the organ of the Communist Party, and we have heard nothing about the intentions of the Republican senator" and dismissed Pravda.ru as an "Oklahoma-City-Pravda", while Sudakov derided Komotsky, claiming that "the circulation of the Communist Party Pravda is like a factory newspaper of AvtoVAZ from the Soviet times". McCain later attempted to publish his op-ed in the Communist Pravda as well, but the paper refused to publish it "because it was not aligned to the political positions of the Communist Party of the Russian Federation".

== Editors-in-chief ==
The editorship of Pravda during its early years was collective and constantly changing; only the more important figures are listed here.

- Joseph Stalin, Yakov Sverdlov, Miron Chernomazov, Lev Kamenev, Vyacheslav Molotov (1912–1914)
- Publication suspended by order of the Bureau of Censorship (1914–1917)
- Vyacheslav Molotov, Alexander Shliapnikov, Konstantin Eremeev, Mikhail Kalinin (5–13 March 1917)
- Joseph Stalin, Matvei Muranov, Lev Kamenev (13 March – 4 April 1917)
- Vladimir Lenin, Grigory Zinoviev, Joseph Stalin, Matvei Muranov, Lev Kamenev (4 April – 5 July 1917)
- Yakov Sverdlov and others (6 July – 9 December 1917)
- Nikolai Bukharin (10 December 1917 – 23 February 1918)
- Unknown (24 February – July 1918)
- Nikolai Bukharin (July 1918 – October 1928; nominally until April 1929)
- Editorial board of Harald Krumin, Yemelyan Yaroslavsky and N. N. Popov (1929–1930)
- Maximilian Saveliev (1930)
- Lev Mekhlis (1930–1937)
- Alexander Poskrebyshev (1937–1940)
- Pyotr Pospelov (1940–1949)
- Mikhail Suslov (1940–1951)
- Leonid Ilyichev (1951–1953)
- Dmitri Shepilov (1953–1956)
- Pavel Satyukov (1956–1964)
- Aleksei Rumyantsev (1964–1965)
- Mikhail Zimyanin (1965–1976)
- Viktor Afanasyev (1976–1989)
- Ivan Frolov (1989–1991)
- Gennadiy Seleznyov (1991–1993)
- Viktor Linnik (1993–1994)
- Aleksander Ilyin (1994–2003)
- Valentina Nikiforova (2003–2005; acting)
- Valentin Shurchanov (2005–2009)
- Boris Komotsky (2009–present)

== Similar newspapers in current communist countries ==
- Granma – Cuba, official newspaper of the Communist Party of Cuba;
- Nhân Dân – Vietnam, official newspaper of the Communist Party of Vietnam;
- Pasaxon – Laos, official newspaper of the Lao People's Revolutionary Party;
- People's Daily – People's Republic of China, official newspaper of the Chinese Communist Party;
- Rodong Sinmun – North Korea, official newspaper of the Workers' Party of Korea;

== See also ==
- Central newspapers of the Soviet Union
- Eastern Bloc information dissemination
- Freedom of the press in Russia
- Iskra
- Izvestia
- Kommunist
- Kommunistka
- Komsomolskaya Pravda
- Krasnaya Zvezda
- Mass media in Russia
- People's correspondent
- Ukrainska Pravda
- Vitali Korionov
- Völkischer Beobachter
- Zreniye
