= Central newspapers of the Soviet Union =

The following publications were known as central newspapers in the Soviet Union. They were organs of the major organizations of the Soviet Union.

- Pravda (Пра́вда, "Truth"), the organ of the Central Committee of the Communist Party of the Soviet Union.
- Izvestia (short for "Izvestiya Sovetov Narodnykh Deputatov SSSR", Известия Советов народных депутатов СССР, the "Reports of Soviets of Peoples' Deputies of the USSR") expressed the official views of the Soviet government as published by the Presidium of the Supreme Soviet of the USSR.
- Komsomolskaya Pravda (Комсомольская правда, "Komsomol's Truth"), the organ of Komsomol.
- Krasnaya Zvezda (Красная звезда, "Red Star"), the organ of the Soviet Armed Forces.
- Sovetskiy Sport (Советский спорт, "Soviet Sports"), the organ of the USSR State Committee for Physical Culture and Sports and VTsSPS
- Trud (Труд, "Labour"), the organ of Soviet trade unions.
- Pionerskaya Pravda (Пионе́рская Пра́вда, "Truth for Young Pioneers"), the official newspaper of the Vladimir Lenin All-Union Pioneer Organization

== See also ==
- Active measures
- Communist propaganda
- Eastern Bloc information dissemination
- Media freedom in Russia
- Printed media in the Soviet Union
- Propaganda
- Propaganda in the Soviet Union
- Russian disinformation
- Soviet disinformation
- State propaganda in the Russian Federation
