= Rebecca Horn =

German visual artist (1944–2024)

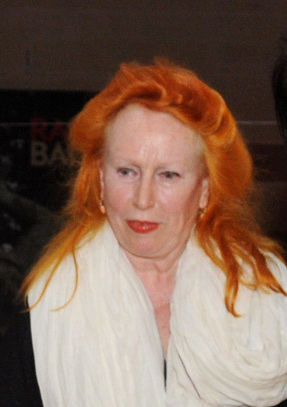
- Horn in 2012
- Born: 24 March 1944; Michelstadt, Gau Hesse-Nassau, Greater German Reich
- Died: 6 September 2024 (aged 80); Bad König, Hesse, Germany
- Education: Hochschule für bildende Künste Hamburg (1964–1970)
- Known for: Sculpture, installation art, performance art and film
- Website: www.rebecca-horn.de

Rebecca Horn (24 March 1944 – 6 September 2024) was a German visual artist best known for her installation art, film directing and body modifications such as Einhorn (Unicorn), a body-suit with a very large horn projecting vertically from the headpiece. While living in Paris and Berlin, she worked in film, sculpture and performance, directing the films Der Eintänzer (1978), La ferdinanda: Sonate für eine Medici-Villa (1982) and Buster's Bedroom (1990).

== Early life and education ==
Rebecca Horn was born on 24 March 1944 in Michelstadt, Germany. Horn's grandfather owned a textile factory in nearby Bad König. She was taught to draw by her Romanian governess. Living in Germany after the end of World War II greatly affected the liking she took to drawing. "We could not speak German. Germans were hated. We had to learn French and English. We were always traveling somewhere else, speaking something else. But I had a Romanian governess who taught me how to draw. I did not have to draw in German or French or English. I could just draw." She contracted tuberculosis as a teenager and drew in her hospital bed. Horn studied economics and philosophy initially at university on the advice of her parents, but after six months she decided to study art.

In 1963 she attended the Hochschule für bildende Künste Hamburg (Hamburg Academy of Fine Arts). In 1964, she had to pull out of art school because she had contracted severe lung inflammation due to fiberglass. "In 1964 I was 20 years old and living in Barcelona, in one of those hotels where you rent rooms by the hour. I was working with glass fibre, without a mask, because nobody said it was dangerous, and I got very sick. For a year I was in a sanatorium. My parents died. I was totally isolated."

After leaving the sanatorium Horn began using soft materials, creating sculptures informed by her illness and long convalescence.

== Career ==
In 1972 Horn was the youngest participant of the documenta in Kassel. Until 1981, Horn lived in New York. After 1981 she mostly lived in Paris. From 1989 to 2004 she took over a professorship at the Berlin University of the Arts. She retired from teaching in 2009. In 2008 and 2009, she mentored Japanese artist Masanori Handa as part of the Rolex Mentor and Protégé Arts Initiative. In 2007, (Note: Other sources state 2010 and 2012.) Horn founded the Moontower Foundation in Bad König, which includes a museum and studios.

Horn was one of a generation of German artists who came to international prominence in the 1980s. She practiced body art, but worked in different media, including performance art, installation art, sculpture and film. She also wrote poetry. Sometimes her poetry was influenced by her work and sometimes vice-versa. When she returned to the Hamburg academy she continued to make cocoon-like things. She worked with padded body extensions and prosthetic bandages. In the late 1960s she began creating performance art and continued to use bodily extensions.

=== Body sculpture ===
In 1968 Horn produced her first body sculptures, in which she attached objects and instruments to the human body, taking as her theme the contact between a person and his or her environment. Einhorn (Unicorn) is one of Horn's best known performance pieces: a long horn worn on her head, its title a pun on her name. She presented Einhorn at the 1972 documenta 5. Its subject is a woman who was described by Horn as "very bourgeois", "21 years-old and ready to marry. She is spending her money on new bedroom furniture". She walks through a field and forest on a summer morning wearing only a white horn protruding directly from the front of the top of her head, held there by straps. These straps are almost identical to the ones in Frida Kahlo's painting The Broken Column. The image, with wheat floating around the woman's hips, is simultaneously mythic and modern.

Pencil Mask is another body extension piece, made up of six straps running horizontally and three straps running vertically. Where the straps intersect a pencil has been attached. When moving her face back and forth on a near a wall the pencil marks that are made correspond directly with her movements.

In 1972 she created Finger Gloves, a performance piece and the main prop of that performance piece. They are worn like gloves, but the finger form extends with balsa wood and cloth. By being able to see what she was touching and the way in which she was touching it, it felt as if her fingers were extended and in her mind the illusion was created that she was actually touching what the extensions were touching. A similar work called "Scratching Both Walls at Once" was part of her 1974 Berlin Exercises series. In this piece, the finger extension gloves she created were longer, measured to specifically fit the performance space. If the chosen participant stood in the middle of the room, they could exactly touch opposing walls simultaneously.

Another piece that involves the illusion of feeling with one's hand is Feather Fingers. (1972). A feather is attached to each finger with a metal ring. The hand becomes "as symmetrical (and as sensitive) as a bird's wing". When touching the opposite arm with these feather fingers one can feel the touch on the left arm and of the fingers on the right hand moving as if to touch the left arm, but it is instead the feathers which make contact. Horn described the effect: "It is as if one hand had suddenly become disconnected from the other like two utterly unrelated beings. My sense of touch becomes so disrupted that the different behavior of each hand triggers contradictory sensations." This piece focuses greatly on sensitivity.

=== Sculpture ===
In her works of the 1970s and 1980s Horn continued to explore the image of feathers. Many of her feathered pieces wrap a figure in the manner of a cocoon, or function as masks or fans, to cover or imprison the body. Some of these pieces are Black Cockfeathers (1971), Cockfeather Mask (1973), Cockatoo Mask (1973) and Paradise Widow (1975).

In the 1980s, various "machines" were the subjects of Horn's work. Among others, she created a machine to mimic the human act of painting in The Little Painting School Performs a Waterfall (1988). Thirteen feet above the floor on a gallery wall, three fan-shaped paint brushes mounted on flexible metal arms slowly flutter down into cups filled with blue and green acrylic paint. After a few seconds of immersion they snap backward, spattering paint onto the wall, the ceiling, the floor and canvases projected from the wall below. The brushes immediately resume their descent and the cycle is repeated until each canvas is covered in paint.

In the 1990s a series of her sculptures were presented in places of historical importance. Examples are the Tower of the Nameless in Vienna (1994), Concert in Reverse in Munich (1997), Mirror of the Night in an abandoned synagogue in Cologne (1998) and Concert for Buchenwald at Weimar (1999). In Weimar, the Concert for Buchenwald was composed on the premises of a former tram depot. Horn layered 40 metre long walls of ashes behind glass, as archives of petrifaction. At the same time, the theme of bodily vitality, which she had been exploring since the 1970s, was developed in site-specific art installations that investigated the subject of the latent energy of places and the magnetic flows of space. This cycle comprises High Moon, New York (1991), El Reio de la Luna, Barcelona (1992) and Spirit di Madreperla, Naples (2002). For the 1992 Summer Olympics in Barcelona, Horn was commissioned to create the steel sculpture L'Estel Ferit.

Many Horn works also explore ambiguities in the idea of lenses. One would think that a large tinted lens exists for protection and cover, but it also has the effect of drawing attention to the person or figure behind it. The paradox of looking out and looking back is explored in her installation piece for Taipei 101, Dialogue between Yin and Yang (2002). The work sets up interactions between viewers, environment and sculpture as it uses binoculars and mirrors to suggest the passive and active energies.

=== Film ===
In what amounted to over ten years of life in New York, Horn undertook the production of highly narrative, full-length films, and incorporated the sculptures and movements from her earlier work into this new context of film, transforming their significance. Horn made her first feature-length film in 1978, Der Eintänzer, about a young man named Max, a blind man and twins. Her later films include La Ferdinanda: Sonata for a Medici Villa and Buster's Bedroom. La Ferdinanda is in German; the other films are in English.

In all of these films Horn's obsession with the imperfect body and the balance between figure and objects is apparent. She also collaborated with Jannis Kounellis and produced some films, including the film Buster's Bedroom (1990) which was shot by the Academy Award-winning Sven Nykvist and stars Donald Sutherland, Geraldine Chaplin and Martin Wuttke. For Buster's Bedroom und Roussel, she collaborated with German writer Martin Mosebach on the respective screenplays.

A number of Horn's mechanised sculptures appeared in her films, notably The Feathered Prison Fan (1978)—covered in large overlapping fans that is big enough to enclose an adult inside—in Der Eintänzer and The Peacock Machine (1979–80), another sculpture that folds and unfolds white peacock plumage in La Ferdinanda.

== Exhibitions ==
When Harald Szeemann invited Horn to participate in the 1972 Documenta in Kassel, she was a virtually unknown twenty-eight-year-old artist. Szeeman had heard of her, because Sigmar Polke had performed in her piece Simon Sigmar in 1971. Horn had her first solo exhibition at the Galerie René Block, in West Berlin, in 1973. She participated in the Venice Biennale, Skulptur Projekte Münster and the Biennale of Sydney, and was one of very few artists who were selected to participate in Documenta on four occasions. Her solo show at the Museum of Contemporary Art, Los Angeles, "Rebecca Horn: Diving through Buster's Bedroom", featured 18 large-scale mechanized sculptures that related to the themes and content from her feature-length film, Buster's Bedroom. In 1993 the Solomon R. Guggenheim Museum, New York, mounted a mid-career retrospective organized by Germano Celant and Nancy Spector, which traveled to the Stedelijk Van Abbemuseum, Eindhoven; Neue Nationalgalerie, Berlin; Kunsthalle Wien, Vienna; Tate Gallery and Serpentine Gallery, London; and Musée de Grenoble. In 2005 the Hayward Gallery in London held a comprehensive Horn retrospective; in conjunction with this exhibition, St Paul's Cathedral showed Horn's installation Moon Mirror. Horn was honoured with museum exhibitions in Tokyo, Rio de Janeiro, Sao Paulo, New Delhi and Moscow.

== Personal life ==
Horn lived in Hamburg until 1971, and in London for a brief time (1971–72). In 1973, she moved to Berlin. A Buddhist, she also lived in Paris and New York. After her teaching career ended, she worked out of a studio in her grandfather's former textile factory in Bad König.

After a stroke in 2015, Horn withdrew from the public. She died in Bad König, Hesse, Germany on 6 September 2024, at the age of 80.

== Public collections ==
Horn's work is in major public collections worldwide, including:

- Harvard Art Museums, Cambridge
- Solomon R. Guggenheim Museum, New York
- The Museum of Modern Art, New York
- Museum of Contemporary Art, Los Angeles
- San Francisco Museum of Modern Art, San Francisco
- Art Gallery of New South Wales, Australia
- Rivoli Castle Museum of Contemporary Art, Turin, Italy
- Tate Gallery, London
- Centre Georges Pompidou, Paris
- Centre for International Light Art, Unna, Germany
- Zentrum für Kunst und Medientechnologie, Karlsruhe, Germany
- Stedelijk Museum, Amsterdam
- Van Abbemuseum, Eindhoven
- Walker Art Center
- Museum Wiesbaden

== Recognition ==
At the Carnegie International in 1988, Horn won the Carnegie Prize for an installation work titled The Hyra Forest/Performing: Oscar Wilde.

In 1992, Horn became the first woman to receive the prestigious Goslarer Kaiserring, and was awarded the Medienkunstpreis Karlsruhe for achievements in technology and art. She was later awarded the 2010 Praemium Imperiale in Sculpture and the Grande Médaille des Arts Plastiques 2011 from the Académie d'Architecture de Paris.

In 2012, Horn received the Austrian Decoration for Science and Art. She was member of the order Pour le Mérite. In 2019, she received the Knight Commander's Cross of the Order of Merit of the Federal Republic of Germany.

== Books ==
- Haenlein, Carl, ed. (1997). Rebecca Horn, the Glance of Infinity. Zürich: Kestner Gesellschaft; Scalo-Verl. ISBN 978-3-931141-65-3. OCLC 921280427.
- Horn, Rebecca (2014). Rebecca Horn. Das Wirbelsäulen Orakel (in German). Ostfildern, Germany: Hatje/Cantz. ISBN 978-3-7757-3888-0. OCLC 882898681.

== See also ==
- List of German women artists
