= Boris Komotsky =

Russian politician

Boris Komotsky MP
- Борис Комоцкий
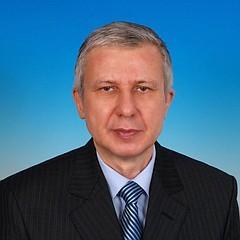

Member of the State Duma (Party List Seat)
- Incumbent
- Assumed office 12 October 2021
- In office 21 December 2011 – 5 October 2016

Personal details
- Born: 31 January 1956 (age 70) Potsdam, East Germany
- Party: Communist Party of the Russian Federation
- Education: Moscow State University (DPhil)
- Occupation: Journalist; Professor

Boris Olegovich Komotsky (Russian: Борис Олегович Комоцкий; born 31 January 1956) is a Russian politician, political scientist, and journalist who served as a deputy of the 6th and 8th Russian State Dumas.

From 1978 to 1990, Komotsky taught scientific communism. In 1990, he participated in the creation and then the work of the press center of the Supreme Soviet of Russia. He is one of the founders of the Center for Research of Political Culture of Russia. In March 1996, he joined the group of consultants and speechwriters of the chairman of the Central Committee of the Communist Party of the Russian Federation Gennady Zyuganov. From 2005 to 2009, he was the Deputy Chief Editor of the Pravda newspaper; in 2009 he was appointed to the post of editor, which he still holds. From 2011 to 2016, he was the deputy of the 6th State Duma. In 2021, he was re-elected for the 8th State Duma.

== Sanctions ==
In 2022, Komotsky was sanctioned by the United Kingdom government in relation to the Russo-Ukrainian War.
