= Vladimir Gubarev =

Belarusian writer, playwright, screenwriter, and journalist (1938–2022)

- Владимир Гу́барев
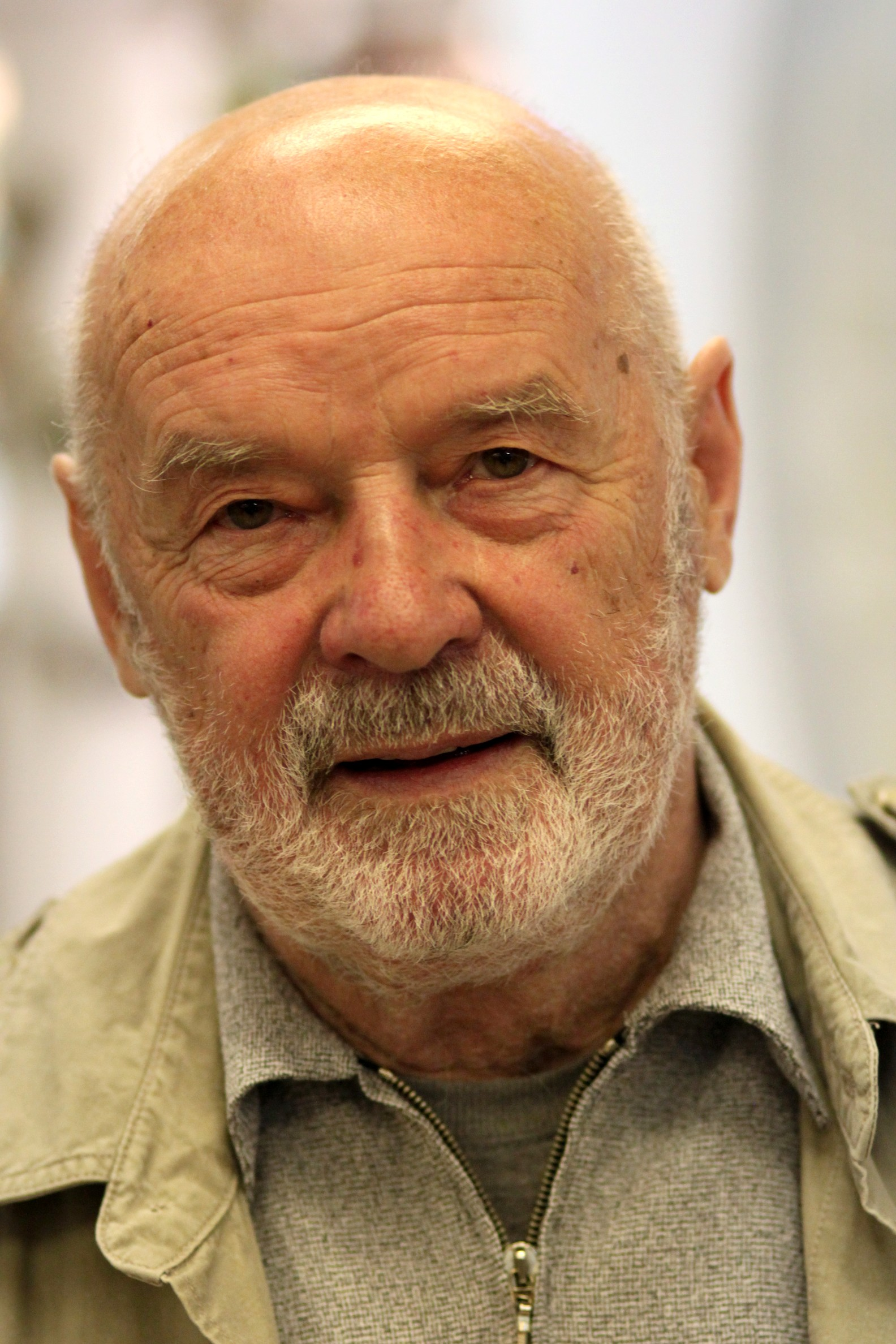
- Gubarev in 2011
- Born: Vladimir Stepanovič Gubarev; 26 August 1938; Mogilev, Belarusian SSR, USSR
- Died: 25 January 2022 (aged 83); Moscow, Russia
- Other names: Vladimir Gubaryov, Wladimir Stepanowitsch Gubarew, Vladimir Stepanovich Gubarev
- Occupation: Writer

Vladimir Stepanovich Gubarev (Russian: Владимир Степанович Гу́барев; 26 August 1938 – 25 January 2022) was a Belarusian writer, playwright, screenwriter and journalist.

== Life and career ==
Born in Mogilev, Gubarev started his career as a Pravda journalist, where he specialized in science-related themes, and particularly space flights. He adapted several of his reports into plays and screenplays. In 1978 he was awarded the USSR State Prize. He got international prominence thanks to his drama play Sarcophagus, based on some Pravda articles he wrote about the 1986 Chernobyl disaster. The drama was nominated at 1987 Laurence Olivier Awards for Best New Play. Gubarev died in Moscow on 25 January 2022, at the age of 83.

When Valery Legasov recorded the Chernobyl Tapes in his home in Moscow, They were labelled 'For Gubarev'. When the KGB recovered the tapes after Legasov's suicide, after they were confiscated, Gubarev was given the tapes and published them into the Pravda newspaper.
