= Damien Sin =

Singaporean author, poet and musician

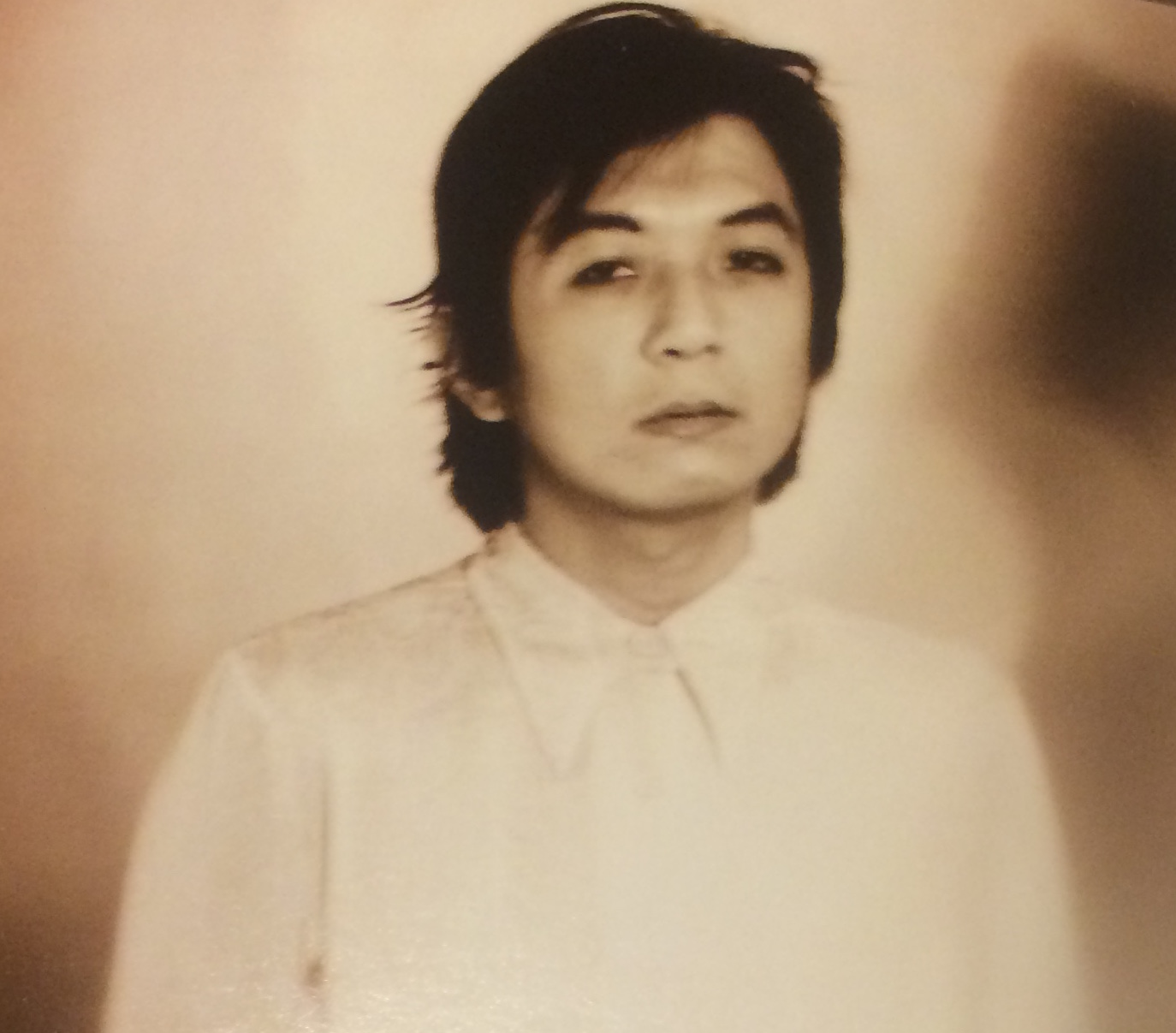
- The late author, Damien Sin.
- Born: Foong Yu Lei; 1965; Singapore
- Died: 2011 (aged 45–46); Singapore
- Occupations: screenwriter, writer, musician
- Writing career
- Language: English

Damien Sin, born Foong Yu Lei (1965 – 2011), was a Singaporean writer, poet and musician. He has written several bestselling books published by Angsana Books, an imprint of Flame Of The Forest Publishing. Sin died in 2011.

== Career ==
After failing his 'A' Levels, Sin started his career as a karaoke-jockey before he turned to writing erotic stories while he was in detention for a drug offence. He was a member of Russell Lee's team of ghost writers. Sin also wrote the screenplay of the critically acclaimed film, Mee Pok Man (1995), which launched director Eric Khoo's career. Its story was based on Sin's short story "One Last Cold Kiss", which appeared in Classic Singapore Horror Stories: Book 2 (1994). Khoo later dedicated his film In the Room (2015) to Sin.

Sin was also the frontman of two bands: Fairweather Friends, whose music appeared on various Pony Canyon compilations released in Singapore in the 1990s, including Dazed and Confused, and Transformer, whose other members went on to form Zircon Lounge. As a solo singer-songwriter, he performed at The Substation in Singapore under the name 'The Hardcore Troubadour'.

== Bibliography ==
- Classic Singapore Horror Stories: Book 1 (1992) ISBN 9789810032432
- Classic Singapore Horror Stories: Book 2 (1994) ISBN 9789813056121
- Tall Tales and Short Stories (1995) ISBN 9789813056138
- Saints, Sinners and Singaporeans: A Collection of Poems (1998) ISBN 9789813056176
- Classic Singapore Horror Stories: Book 3 (2000) ISBN 9789813056404
- Classic Singapore Horror Stories: Book 4 (2003) ISBN 9789813056688
