= In the Room (2015 film) =

2015 Singaporean film

- Theatrical release poster
- Directed by: Eric Khoo
- Written by: Eric Khoo; Jonathan Lim
- Produced by: Nansun Shi
- Starring: Josie Ho; George Young; Daniel Jenkins; Show Nishino; Choi Woo-shik; Lawrence Wong
- Cinematography: Brian Gothong Tan
- Edited by: Natalie Soh
- Music by: Christopher Khoo; Christine Shan
- Production company: Zhao Wei Films
- Distributed by: Encore Films
- Release dates: 15 September 2015 (TIFF); 25 February 2016 (Singapore)
- Running time: 104 minutes
- Country: Singapore
- Languages: English; Mandarin Chinese; Cantonese; Thai; Japanese; Korean
- Budget: $800,000
- Box office: S$48,000

In the Room is a 2015 Singaporean erotic drama film directed by Eric Khoo and written by Khoo and Jonathan Lim. The film stars Josie Ho, George Young, Daniel Jenkins, Koh Boon Pin, W Leon U, Show Nishino, Lawrence Wong, Nadia AR, and Ian Tan.

The film comprises six different stories of couples in a single-room at a hotel in Singapore, spread over several decades. The film is marked as Singapore's first erotic film. At the same time, Khoo downplays the film's erotic themes, calling its ode to the national cultural trends "a look at Singapore through the decades. It's a homage to the country". Khoo dedicated the film to the late writer Damien Sin, who wrote Khoo's career-launching Mee Pok Man (1995).

The story starts just after the surrender of the British to Japanese troops in Singapore in 1942. Six stories of six different Japanese, Thai, British, Chinese, and Korean couples are set in the same hotel room, spread over several decades.

== Synopsis ==
The plot is divided into six short stories.

=== Rubber ===
In the 1940s decade, two men Kong (Singaporean) and Lawrence (British) talk to each other about staying or leaving Singapore.

=== Pussy ===
A Singaporean brothel madame teaches her prostitute students how to get pleasure by punishing scoundrel men sexually in the 1950s decade.

=== Listen ===
In 1960s, a rock & roll and sex party occurs in the new year's eve; a Singaporean male singer named Damien gets attracted to a female maid whose name is Imrah (Singaporean), the singer dies by overdose of drugs.

=== Change ===
A Thai transsexual 'Noi' in 1970s tells her lover An (Thai) that she shall undergo genital changing surgery.

=== Search ===
Mariko, a Japanese young married woman involves in sex with her Singaporean boyfriend Boon in '80s.

=== First Time ===
In the '90s, Korean couple Min Jun and Seo Yun discuss about romantic and sexual relationship.

== Cast ==
- Daniel Jenkins as Lawrence
- Koh Boon Pin as Kong
- Josie Ho as the brothel madame
- Nadia AR as Imrah
- Ian Tan as Damien
- George Young as Vernon
- Netnaphad Pulsavad as Noi
- W. Leon Unaprom as An
- Shou Nishino as Mariko
- Lawrence Wong as Boon
- Choi Woo-shik as Min Jun
- Kim Kkot-bi as Seo Yun
- Michelle Goh as Bruised prostitute
- Zephyr Khambatta as Drummer of Desker 5

== Production ==
The $800,000-budgeted film was produced by Nansun Shi and Zhao Wei Films, and distributed and financed by Distribution Workshop.

Nansun Shi is producing the $800,000 budgeted film along with Zhao Wei Films, and Eric Khoo is directing the film based on his own co-written script with Jonathan Lim. Distribution Workshop financed the film. Hong Kong actress Josie Ho stars in the film as a mama-san (a brothel owner). The cast includes from different countries like Singapore-based actors are George Young, Daniel Jenkins and Koh Boon Pin, from Thailand is Aeaw, from Japan is actress Shou Nishino and from Malaysia is Lawrence Wong, while other cast includes Nadia Ar and Ian Tan. Director Khoo told Today about the casting:

I must say I'm really happy because finally, my characters have come alive. And because it's been on the drawing board for so long. Also it's really good to have the foreign actors come in because prior to that, it's only been Skype calls. And now, having met them in person and walking through the motions and scenarios with them, it's exciting.

Principal photography began on 3 September 2014 at the Infinite Studios in Singapore.

== Release ==
The film premiered at the Toronto International Film Festival in September 2015 and travelled to the San Sebastián International Film Festival, Busan International Film Festival and Singapore International Film Festival before the director withdrew his submission for a rating for the film from the Media Development Authority (MDA) as the MDA had deemed that two scenes exceeded the film classification guidelines. Khoo did not want any cuts for a commercial release of the film in Singapore and so the film was denied a commercial release as unrated films are not allowed for public release in Singapore. However, on 25 February 2016, the film was given a theatrical release in Singapore after an "international version" with subtle differences from the original was passed uncut with an R21 rating by the MDA.

== Reception ==
Critics generally criticised In the Room. Justin Chang of Variety wrote that the film's "conceptual poignancy isn't matched by the execution onscreen" and that this "sex-a-thon winds up feeling like the wrong kind of grind". Reviewing the film on Screen Daily, Wendy Ide found it "hampered by a wildly uneven tone", predicting that "the film's prospects outside the festival circuit look slim". David Rooney of The Hollywood Reporter also found In the Room's tone "uneven", adding that the film's "intriguing idea" is let down by "the execution, particularly in the script and acting departments... the writing and performances [are] too lacking in subtlety to lend those ideas much of an intoxicating spell."

Singapore critics also criticised the film: Lisa Twang of The New Paper noted that the film was "hampered by an uneven tone. The comic and tragic elements do not always blend together well", giving it 3/5. Prabu Krishna Moorthy of AsiaOne awarded it 2.5/5: while praising its "marvelous idea" and successful "episodic approach", he found that "the film only provides a cursory look at different characters" whose "stories deserved more screen time". Zaki Jufri of inSing gave the film 3/5, finding that the film is "Khoo's boldest work but its unevenness hampers from being one of his best." John Lui of The Straits Times also gave the film 2.5/5, calling it a "courageous try at mingling the history of Singapore with the lovemaking of its characters" while noting its "uneven" results, "with the fault lying mostly with the writing, which tries to be thoughtful and titillating at the same time, while succeeding at neither."
