= Perfect Rivals =

- Directed by: Han Yew Kwang
- Written by: Han Yew Kwang; Ting Soo Yun
- Produced by: Lim Soo Ann; Au Yuk Sing
- Starring: Ha Yu; Irene Ang; Mindee Ong; Josh Lai; Stanly Hsu; Pamelyn Chee
- Cinematography: Long Fei Liu
- Edited by: Grace Xiao
- Production companies: mm2 Entertainment; Fly Entertainment; Singapore Film Commission
- Distributed by: Golden Village Pictures
- Release date: 17 March 2011
- Running time: 95 minutes
- Countries: Singapore; Malaysia
- Language: Mandarin
- Box office: $800,000

Perfect Rivals (Chinese: 美好冤家) is a 2011 Malaysian-Singaporean romantic comedy film directed by Han Yew Kwang, starring Ha Yu, Irene Ang, Mindee Ong, Josh Lai, Stanly Hsu and Pamelyn Chee.

== Cast ==
- Ha Yu as Chen Hao
  - Alaric Tay as young Chen Hao
- Irene Ang as Zhen Mei Mei
  - Adele Wong as young Mei Mei
- Mindee Ong as Zhen Yuan Yuan
- Josh Lai as Xiao Hu
- Stanly Hsu as Xiao Ma
- Pamelyn Chee as Zhen Zhen Zhen
- Crispian Chan as Pin Pin
- Marcus Chin as Bak Kwa Master
- Alvin Wong as Mickey
- Michelle Yim as Monica Cheng

== Release ==
The film was initially set to open in theatres during Chinese New Year. However, the film's release was delayed till March as there were already three other local films opening during Chinese New Year. The film opened in theatres on 17 March 2011. It was a box office failure, grossing only $155,000.

== Reception ==
Christopher Toh of Today rated the film 3.5 stars out of 5 and wrote: "There are no blatant messages or high concepts here — just a nice family movie with a character we care for. And sometimes, this sort of simple pleasure works just fine." Genevieve Loh, also of Today, gave the film a rating of "B-" and wrote that it "needs just that bit more meat and finesse for it to become the fully realised film it has the potential to be."

Tan Kee Yun of The New Paper rated the film 2.5 stars out of 5 and praised the performances of Ha and Ang, but wrote that they "do not make up for the uneven, cliched script and cringe-inducing acting by younger cast members such as Taiwanese Stanly Hsu and Malaysian Josh Lai." Boon Chan of The Straits Times rated the film 1.5 stars out of 5 and wrote that Han "tries unsuccessfully to mix heartwarming family drama, gross-out comedy and scattered social commentary", and that the result is "too tough to swallow."
