= Mindee Ong =

Singaporean actress (born 1979)

- Born: 7 October 1979 (age 46); Singapore
- Other name: Wang Xin
- Occupation: Actress
- Years active: 1990s–present
- Children: 2

Chinese name
- Chinese: 王欣
- Hanyu Pinyin: Wáng Xīn

Mindee Ong (born 7 October 1979) is a Singaporean actress best known for starring in the Royston Tan films 881 and 12 Lotus, as well as in the television series Let It Go.

== Career ==
Ong starred in Royston Tan films 881 and 12 Lotus. She then starred in the 2010 comedy film Lelio Popo, the 2011 romantic comedy film Perfect Rivals and the television series Anything Goes. She starred in the 2014 Malaysian horror film The Transcend.

In 2015, Ong starred in the television series Let It Go. She was cast to act in Crescendo but withdrew from the drama before production started. The role went to Dawn Yeoh. In the same year, she starred in My Papa Rich. She appeared in the second season of Folklore.

== Personal life ==
She has two daughters.

== Filmography ==
=== Film ===
- Birthday (2005; short film)
- 881 (2007)
- 12 Lotus (2008)
- Lelio Popo (2010)
- Perfect Rivals (2011)
- Filial Party (2014)
- Seventh (2014)
- The Transcend (2014)
- My Papa Rich (2015)
- The Dream Boyz (2015)
- Will You Be My Valentine? (2016; short film)

=== Television series ===
- Different Cuts Different Strokes S1 (1997)
- Different Cuts Different Strokes S2 (1998)
- Different Cuts Different Strokes S3 (1999)
- Let It Go (2015)
- The Pupil 2 (2011)
- Folklore (2021)
- Silent Walls (2023)
- Born to Shine (2024)
- We Are Number 1 (2025)

== Awards and nominations ==
Year	Organisation	Category	Nominated work	Result	Ref
2025	Star Awards	Top 10 Most Popular Female Artistes	—N/a	Nominated	
