= Eric Khoo =

Singaporean film director and producer (born 1965)

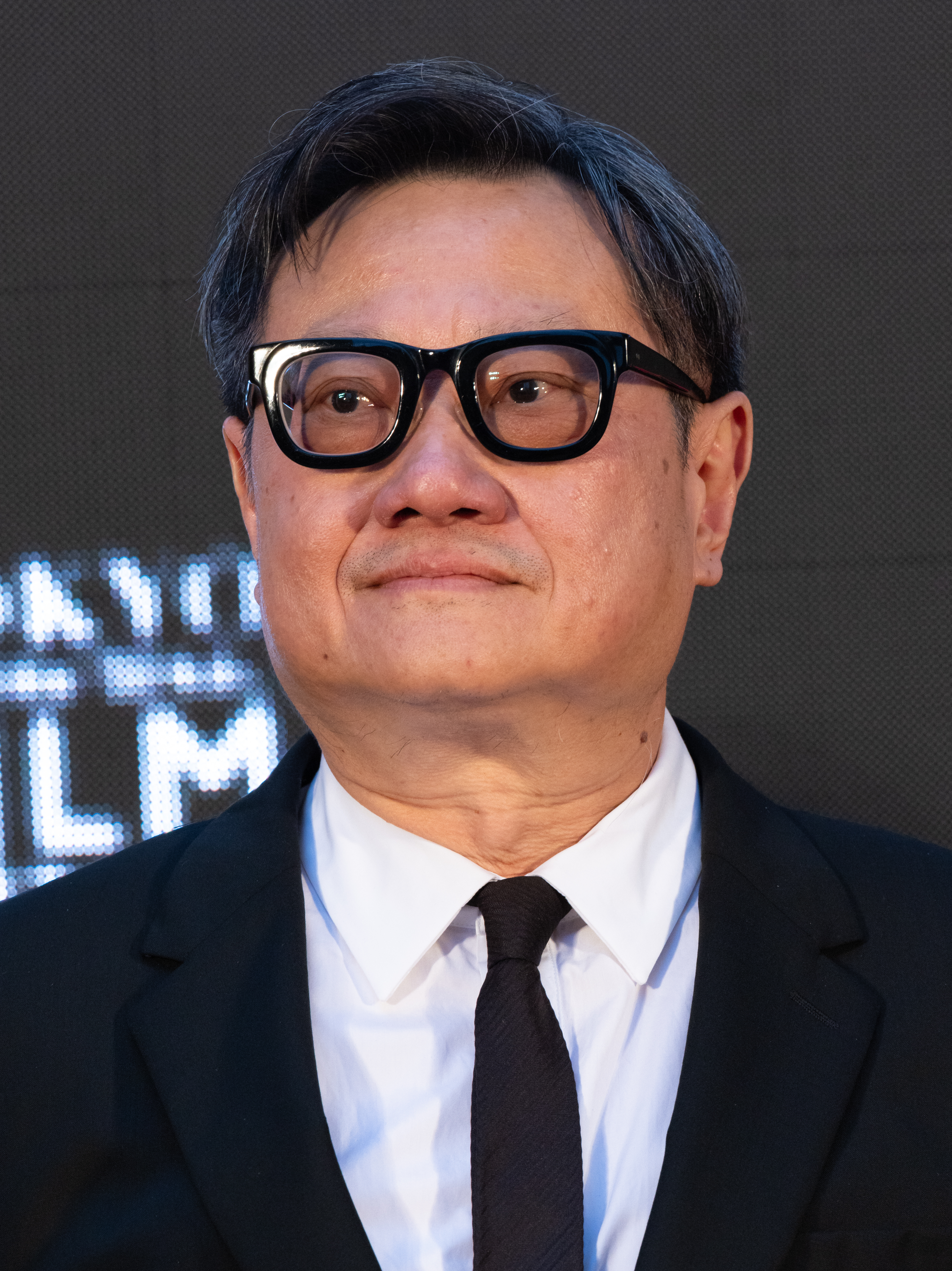
- Khoo at the 37th Tokyo International Film Festival in 2024
- Born: Eric Khoo Kim Hai; 27 March 1965 (age 61); Singapore
- Education: United World College of South East Asia; City Art Institute, Sydney
- Occupations: Film director; screenwriter; producer; cinematographer
- Years active: 1990–present
- Spouse: Kim Eun Choo (m. 1997)
- Children: 4
- Parents: Khoo Teck Puat (father); Rose Marie Wee (mother)

Chinese name
- Chinese: 邱金海
- Hanyu Pinyin: Qiū Jīnhǎi
- Hokkien POJ: Khu Kim-hái

Eric Khoo Kim Hai (Note: Chinese: 邱金海; pinyin: Qiū Jīnhǎi. In this Chinese name, the family name is Khoo. In accordance with custom, the Western-style name is Eric Khoo and the Chinese-style name is Khoo Kim Hai.) (born 27 March 1965) is a Singaporean film director and producer who is often credited for the revival of Singapore's modern film industry.

== Early life and education ==
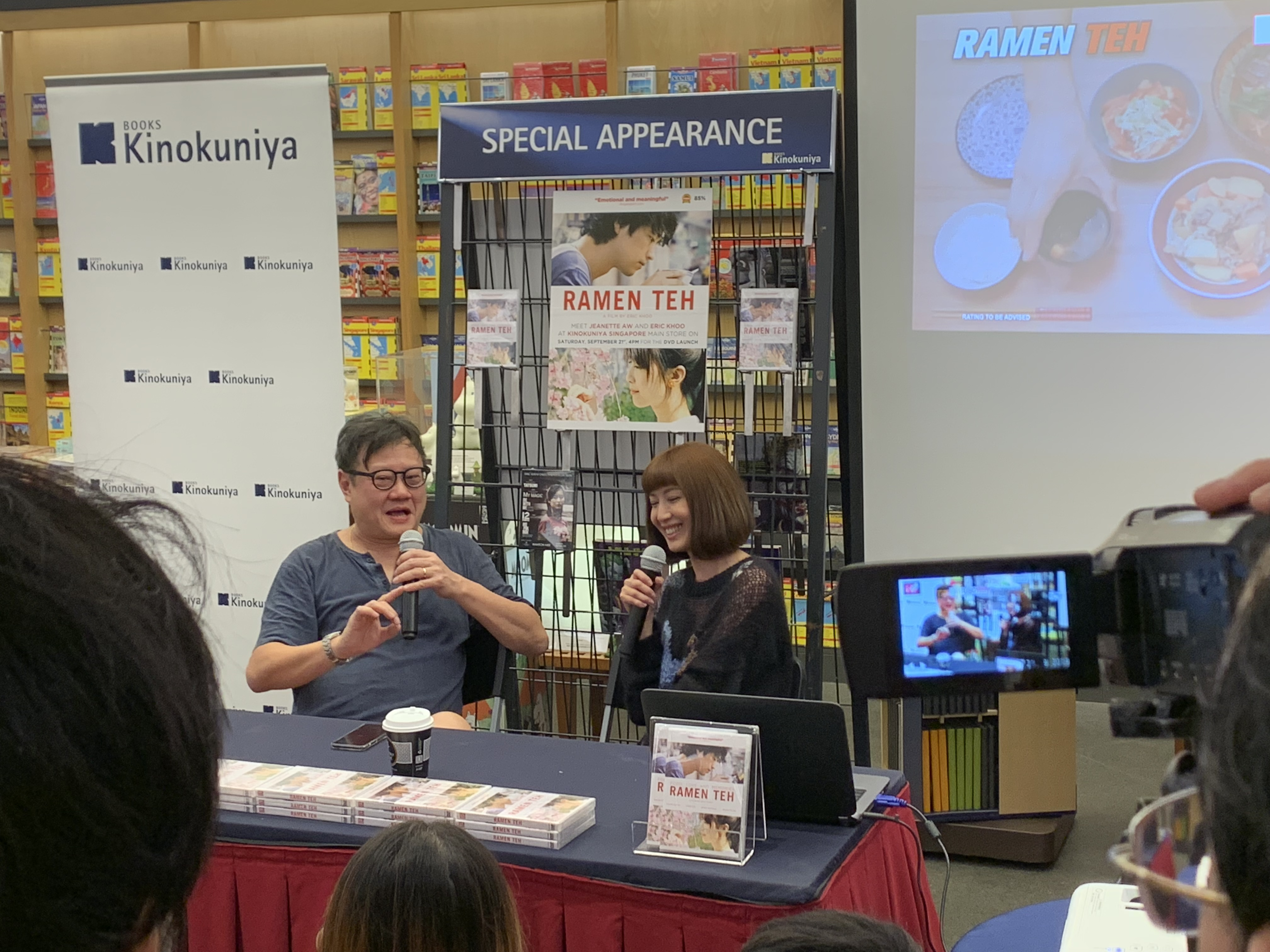
Khoo and Jeanette Aw promoting Ramen Teh, 2019

Born on 27 March 1965 in Singapore, Eric Khoo was the youngest son of the 15 children of Tan Sri Khoo Teck Puat from his second wife Rose Marie Wee. His mother, who was a cinephile, introduced him to cinema when he was three years old. He later received his education at the United World College of South East Asia.

Khoo's interest in film eventually led him to study cinematography at the City Art Institute in Sydney, Australia.

== Career ==
In 1990, Khoo started directing short films with Barbie Digs Joe as his first short film. In 1991, his short film August won the Singapore International Film Festival's (SIFF) Silver Screen Award for Best Singaporean short film.

In 1992, the short film Carcass, which draws parallels between the life of a businessman and that of a butcher, was the first local film to be given an R(A) rating. In 1994, Pain, the story of a sadomasochism young man, won Khoo the Best Director and Special Achievement Awards at the 1994 Sadomasochism but was banned in Singapore because of its graphically violent scenes.

In 1995, Khoo filmed his first feature film, Mee Pok Man, the first full-length film made by an independent Singaporean filmmaker on a tight budget of $70,000 to S$100,000. Concerning a lonely noodle seller who falls for a prostitute, Mee Pok Man earned much critical accolade worldwide and encouraged more experimental, independent filmmaking in the nation. The film was also the first Singaporean feature film to be entered for SIFF.

Khoo's films Mee Pok Man and 12 Storeys have together been screened at over 60 film festivals, held all over the world including prestigious festivals such as Venice, Berlin and Rotterdam.

In 1998, Khoo was ranked as one of the 25 exceptional trend makers of Asia by Asiaweek magazine and in the following year was included into Asiaweek's leaders for the millennium issue. He was an executive producer for the local comedy hit, Liang Po Po – The Movie (1999), and One Leg Kicking (2001), which were both the highest grossing local movies for their respective years in Singapore. He also produced 15 (2003) directed by Royston Tan, which screened at the Venice Film Festival (2003) and Sundance (2004). His TV work includes being executive producer of DRIVE, an anthology series for the Television Corporation of Singapore (1998), and Seventh Month (2004), a highly acclaimed TV horror series for Channel U (under SPH Mediaworks). These productions served as a platform for grooming young talented filmmakers.

Some of his notable achievements include being the first recipient of the National Arts Councils Young Artist Award for Film in 1997 and together with James Toh and Lucilla Teoh they wrote the White Paper which resulted in the formation of the Singapore Film Commission.

In 2004, Khoo directed his third feature Be With Me which was selected as the opening film for the Directors’ Fortnight Cannes 2005. The film has since won several awards overseas and has been invited to the Toronto International Film Festival, Telluride Film Festival, Pusan International Film Festival amongst others. It has also received international distribution including the US and Europe with glowing reviews in the French media when it opened in October 2005.

Khoo was a judge at the 10th Busan International Film Festival 2005 and Be With Me is the first Singaporean film to be nominated for the European Film Awards 2005. In 2006, Khoo executive produced Royston Tan’s second feature 4:30 and was invited to direct for the Jeonju Digital Film Festival in Korea – No Day Off the story of an Indonesian maid. He was the first Singapore director whose films were featured in a retrospective in Korea. The Seoul Independent Film Festival paid this tribute to him.

In 2007, Khoo was appointed as a board member of NYU Tisch School of the Arts, Asia. He produced Royston Tan's 881 a box office hit and received the highest arts honor the Cultural Medallion by the President of Singapore in the same year. In 2008, Khoo's film, My Magic was selected for Cannes official selection main competition. It is distributed in France by ARP and Wild bunch for international sales. My Magic picked up the best film award at Fribourg International Film Festival and was voted best film of 2008 by Le Monde.

In 2009, Khoo entered into a partnership with Infinite Frameworks to form a new company, Gorylah, specializing in the production of genre films. Gorylah's maiden effort, Darah, went on to win the Best Actress award at the 2009 Puchon International Fantastic Film Festival. Khoo executive produced Boo Junfeng's first feature film, Sandcastle. The film was selected for 2010 Critic's Week at Cannes. Centre Pompidou in Paris held an Eric Khoo retrospective in 2010 and he was featured in Phaidon Books, Take 100 - The Future of Film, 100 new directors. Khoo was president of the jury for the International Competition at the 63rd edition of the Locarno International Film Festival in 2010.

Tatsumi, based on the life and short stories of Yoshihiro Tatsumi, is Khoo's first animation feature which premiered at the 64th Cannes Film Festival in 2011 and world sales is handled by The Match Factory. Tatsumi won best animated feature at the Sitges Film Festival and the best film and best composer in the Muhr AsiaAfrica Awards at the 8th Dubai International Film Festival. It made its North American premiere at The Museum of Modern Art (MoMA). In the same year his production 23:59, an army paranormal film, was number one at the Singapore box office. In 2012, Khoo was Jury President at the Asian Film Awards and Rotterdam International Film Festival. He was the head of the Jury at Puchon International Fantastic Film Festival 2013.

Khoo has five critically acclaimed feature films that were at film festivals all over the world: Mee Pok Man (1995), 12 Storeys (1997), Be with Me (2005), My Magic (2008), and Tatsumi (2011). Mee Pok Man won prizes in Singapore, Fukuoka, and Pusan. It was also entered into the 19th Moscow International Film Festival. 12 Storeys won him the Federation of International Film Critics (FIPRESCI) Award and the UOB Young Cinema Award at the 10th Singapore International Film Festival, and the Golden Maile Award for Best Picture at the 17th Hawaii International Film Festival. 12 Storeys was also the first Singapore film to be invited to take part in the Cannes Film Festival. Be With Me opened the Directors' Fortnight at the 2005 Cannes Film Festival, while My Magic was nominated for the Palme d'Or at the 2008 Cannes Film Festival and was voted as one of the top five films of that year by Le Monde. Most recently, Tatsumi, based on manga artist Yoshihiro Tatsumi's memoir, premiered in the Un Certain Regard section at the 2011 Cannes Film Festival.

In September 2014, Khoo announced that he will release a drama anthology, In the Room, in 2015. Exploring themes of love and sensuality, the film will star Hong Kong actress Josie Ho, up and coming Korean actor Choi Woo-shik, Japanese adult-film actress Shou Nishino, and actor Koh Boon Pin, who starred in Khoo's 12 Storeys. In the Room will also feature a homage to controversial cabaret dancer Rose Chan, the subject of a biopic that was first announced in 2009 but is still under development. In the Room premiered at the Toronto International Film Festival in September 2015 and travelled to the San Sebastián International Film Festival, Busan International Film Festival and Singapore International Film Festival. It was initially unable to be screened for commercial release in Singapore as Khoo refused to edit two scenes that exceeded the MDA's film classification guidelines. Later, the subtly different 'international version' of the film was given a commercial release on 25 February 2016, after it was passed uncut with an R21 rating by the Media Development Authority.

In December 2015, Mee Pok Man was restored by the Asian Film Archive for its 20th anniversary and screened at the Singapore International Film Festival. The high-resolution Digital Cinema Package version, restored from original 35mm prints, also enjoyed screenings at arthouse cinema The Projector in April and May 2016, with a panel discussion on the film's legacy.

2015 also saw the release of Khoo's short film, Cinema, as part of the omnibus, 7 Letters, to commemorate Singapore's 50th year of independence. In addition, Khoo released the telemovie Wanton Mee on okto in March, before it travelled to the Culinary Zinema section of the 63rd San Sebastian Film Festival in September and the 10th Culinary Cinema programme of the 2016 Berlinale in February, where chefs like Alexander Dressel took turns serving a menu inspired by the programme's films. Wanton Mee, a look at the transformation of Singapore's versatile street food scene, is also screening on Singapore Airlines' inflight entertainment programming.

In 2016, Khoo collaborated with some of Southeast Asia's most renowned filmmakers as part of an omnibus project commissioned by National Gallery Singapore, Art Through Our Eyes. This project brought together – for the first time – filmmakers Joko Anwar (Indonesia), Ho Yuhang (Malaysia), Brilliante Mendoza (Philippines), Apichatpong Weerasethakul (Thailand), and Eric Khoo (Singapore).

In 2018, Khoo directed Ramen Teh, which stars Seiko Matsuda. The film premiered as the closing film of the Culinary Cinema section at the Berlin International Film Festival. He also launched the Scream Asia Festival in Singapore.

== Personal life ==
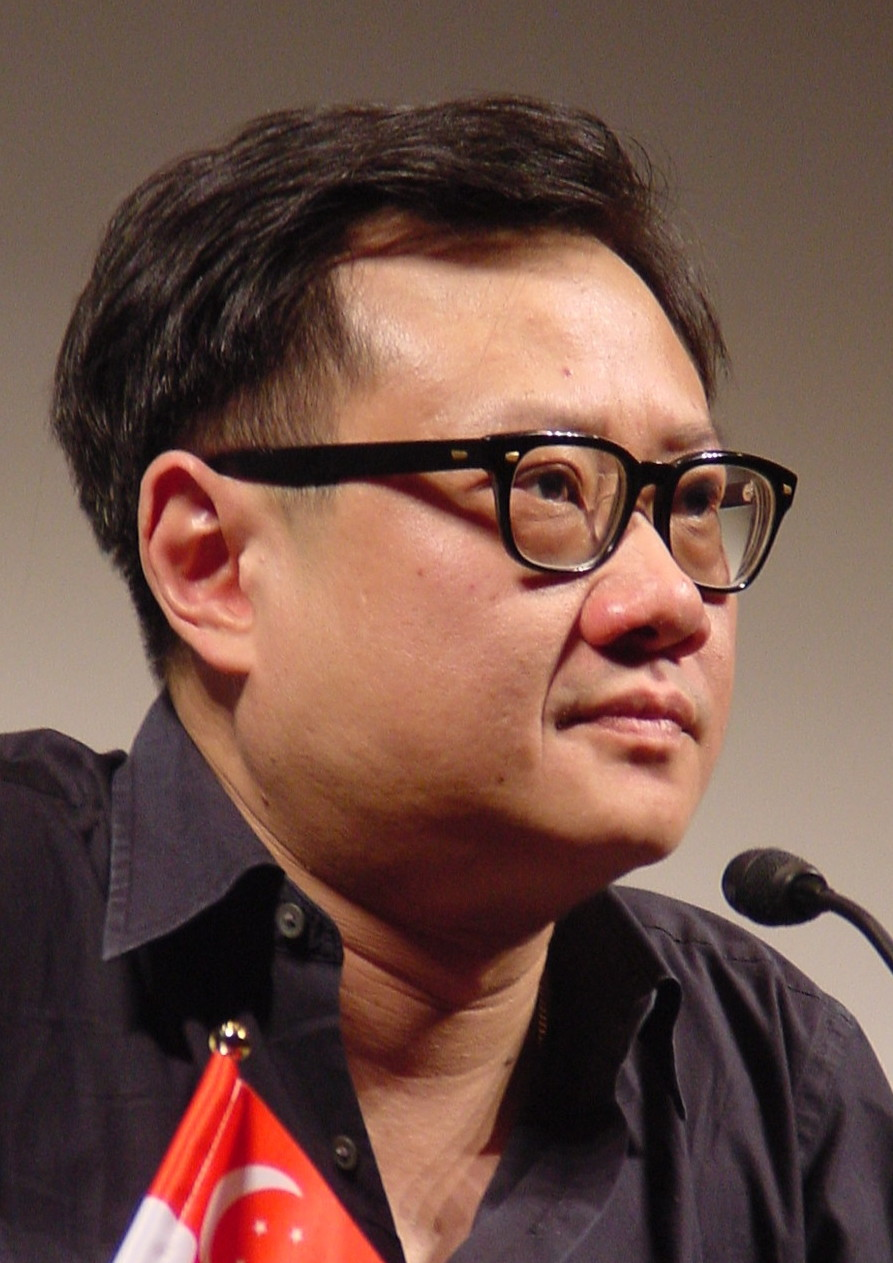
Khoo in 2010

Khoo is married to Kim Eun Choo; they have four sons named Edward, James, Christopher, and Lucas.

== Selected filmography ==
Year	Title	Roles	Note
1990	Barbie Digs Joe	Director, writer	Short
1991	Hope and Requiem	Director, writer	Short
1991	August	Director, writer	Short
1992	The Punk Rocker and...	Director	Short
1992	Carcass	Director	
1993	Symphony 92.4 FM	Director	Short
1993	The Watchman	Director	Short
1994	Pain	Director, producer	Short
1995	Mee Pok Man	Director	
1997	12 Storeys	Director, writer	Nominated for the Un Certain Regard Award
1999	Liang Po Po: The Movie	Executive producer	
1999	Stories About Love	Executive producer	
2000	Moments of Magic VDO	Director	Singapore's millennium MTV
2000	Home VDO	Director	Short
2001	One Leg Kicking	Writer, executive producer	
2003	15: The Movie	Producer	
2005	Be With Me	Director, writer	Singapore's official entry to the 78th Academy Awards for Best Foreign Language Film
2006	Digital Sam in Sam Saek 2006: Talk to Her	Director	Segment: "No Day Off"
2006	Zombie Dogs	Producer	
2006	0430	Producer	
2007	881	Producer	Singapore's official entry to the 80th Academy Awards for Best Foreign Language Film
2008	My Magic	Director, writer	Singapore's official entry to the 81st Academy Awards for Best Foreign Language Film
2008	Invisible Children	Producer	
2009	Darah	Producer	
2010	Sandcastle	Producer	
2011	Tatsumi	Director	Animated Film; Singapore's official entry to the 84th Academy Awards for Best Foreign Language Film
2011	60 Seconds of Solitude in Year Zero	Director	Segment
2012	23:59	Producer	
2013	Ghost Child	Producer	
2013	Recipe	Director	Telemovie
2015	In the Room	Director	
2015	7 Letters	Director	Segment: "Cinema"; Singapore's official entry to the 88th Academy Awards for Best Foreign Language Film
2015	Wanton Mee	Director	Telemovie
2016	Apprentice	Executive Producer	Singapore's official entry to the 89th Academy Awards for Best Foreign Language Film
2016	Art Through Our Eyes	Writer	Segment: "Chua Mia Tee"
2018	Ramen Teh	Director	Won the Audience Choice Award at the Minneapolis–Saint Paul International Film Festival
2018	Folklore	Creator, Director	TV series; 1 episode
2018	Buffalo Boys	Executive Producer	
2019	Food Lore	Director	TV series
2019	Piece of Meat	Writer, Co-Producer	Short
2022	Food Affair with Mark Wiens	Creator, Executive Producer	TV series
2024	Spirit World	Director	

== Awards ==
- Best Director for a Short Film at the Singapore International Film Festival in 1994
- National Arts Council, Singapore Young Artist Award for Film in 1997
- Singapore Youth Awards in 1999
- Best Director at the Torino Film Festival in 2005
- Singapore Youth Awards Medal Of Commendation in 2006
- Chevalier de l'ordre des arts et des letters in 2008

== See also ==
- Cinema of Singapore
