= Michelle Goh =

Singaporean actress and entrepreneur

- Born: 9 September 1973 (age 52); Singapore
- Occupation: Actress
- Years active: 1995–present

Chinese name
- Simplified Chinese: 吴怡慧
Transcriptions
Standard Mandarin
- Hanyu Pinyin: Wú Yí Huì

Michelle Goh (Chinese: 吴怡慧; pinyin: Wú Yí Huì, born 9 September 1973), is a Singaporean actress and entrepreneur. She left MediaCorp in 1998 and has been staying in Canada for 10 years.

== Acting career ==
Goh was approached by Eric Khoo while dancing at Zouk, a Singapore nightclub, for the role of Bunny for Mee Pok Man. After filming the film, Goh signed with Television Corporation of Singapore (TCS) for three years. She finished the contract and left Singapore.

Goh has appeared in Da Vinci's Inquest (1998 - 2005), Smallville (2001), Sacred, Out for a Kill (2003), Alien Lockdown (2004) and Human Cargo (2004), and as well as other films and TV episodes.

== Business career ==
Goh founded Float House in 2014, a floating therapy wellness centre at Novena Medical Centre. Float House ceased business on 2016.

== Personal life ==
After finishing her contract with TCS, Goh left Singapore for Vancouver in 1998. She returned to Singapore after 10 years.

== Filmography ==
=== Film ===
Year	Title	Role	Notes	Ref
1995	Mee Pok Man	Bunny		
1999	Ghoststories	Claire		
2004	Out for a Kill	Tommie Ling		
2004	Alien Lockdown	Commander Rita Talon		
2004	Predatorman	Talon		
2015	In the Room	Cameo		

=== Television ===
Year	Title	Role	Notes	Ref	
1996	My Grandson, the Doctor	Pamela Heng			
1997	Immortal Love 不老传说	Wen Xiao-qian 温小倩 / Jingjing	1997	Uncle Playing To Win 当自强	夏宁
1998	Seven Days	Michelle Shing			
1998	Da Vinci's Inquest	Vera Zang / June Wong			
1998	VR Man	Kristal Kong			
2000	Dark Angel	Michiko			
2000	Secret Angel Man	Doctor			
2000	The Immortal	Oniko			
2001	Smallville	Professor Sen / Suki			
2001	The Chris Isaak Show	Debbie Fung			
2001	MythQuest	Yuki / Yuni-Onna			
2004	Human Cargo	Li Dan-Yi	1 episode		

== Awards and nominations ==
Year	Awards	Category	Nominated work	Result	Ref
1997	Star Awards	Best Newcomer	—N/a	Nominated	
