= Tavin Marin Titus =

American film producer

Tavin Marin
- Born: 1971 (age 54–55); Santa Monica, California
- Occupation: film producer
- Spouse: Richard D. Titus (married 1999-2013)
- Children: 2

Tavin Marin Titus (born 1971) is a film producer. She has worked on projects from blockbusters The Day After Tomorrow, Independence Day and Godzilla to producing Syfy originals, including Odysseus: Isle of the Mist, Alien Lockdown and Emmy-nominated Mammoth.

Titus executive-produced two Sundance Film Festival selections, On Line and 2006 independent award-winning documentary film Who Killed the Electric Car?

In 2012 Titus produced the transmedia science fiction series RCVR, which received twelve nominations for IAWTV Awards, and won Best Webseries and Drama.

Titus lives in San Francisco, California.
