= Larva (film) =

2005 television film directed by Tim Cox

- Screenplay by: J. Paul V. Robert; T.M. Van Ostrand; David Goodin; Kevin Moore
- Story by: Kenneth M. Badish; Boaz Davidson
- Directed by: Tim Cox
- Starring: Vincent Ventresca; Rachel Hunter; David Selby; William Forsythe
- Composer: John Dickson
- Country of origin: United States
- Original language: English

Production
- Executive producers: Theodore Melfi; Richard Salvatore; David E. Ornston; Johnny Martin; Avi Lerner; Danny Dimbort; Trevor Short; John Thompson; Josef Lautenschlager; Andreas Thiesmeyer; Gerd Koechlin; Manfred D. Heid
- Producers: Boaz Davidson; Kenneth M. Badish
- Cinematography: Stephen Lighthill
- Editors: Joe Plenys; David Grecu
- Running time: 90 minutes
- Production companies: Nu Image; Active Entertainment; Equity Pictures Medienfonds GmbH & Co. KG
- Budget: $1.5 million

Original release
- Network: Sci Fi Channel
- Release: January 22, 2005

Larva is a 2005 American science fiction horror television film directed by Tim Cox. The screenplay by J. Paul V. Robert, T.M. Van Ostrand, David Goodin, and Kevin Moore is from a story by Kenneth M. Badish and Boaz Davidson. The film stars Vincent Ventresca, Rachel Hunter, David Selby, and William Forsythe.

== Plot ==
The film taking place in Host, Missouri about a species of fluke-like parasites that have been mutated after ingesting enhanced cow feed. They infect animals (including humans) from the inside and grow at an enormous rate, bursting out of their hosts when they became adults. They go on a rampage, eating anything in their way until they were all killed in a massive explosion.

== Cast ==
- Vincent Ventresca as Eli Rudkus
- Rachel Hunter as Hayley Anderson
- William Forsythe as Jacob Long
- David Selby as Fletcher Odermatt
- Robert Miano as Sheriff Lester
- James Daris as Kenneth Anderson
- James Sheldon as Johnny
- Zachary Stevens as Ted
- Amanda Ianelli as Shelly
- Jessica Summers as Veronica
- Holly McWilliams as Madeline
- Sean Kissner as Milo Turner
- David E. Ornston as Dr. Cummings
- Erron Jay as Deputy
- Sarah Ann Schultz as Barbara
- Kyle Dick as Christopher
- Brandi Prine as Emily
- Johnathon Prine as Jason
- George Cron as The Mortician
- Aimée Flaherty as Nurse
- Nicholas J. Coleman as Patrick
- Carolyn Woodworth as Sally
- John Dickson as Tom Ridgeway
- Jennifer Lyn Quackenbush as News Reporter

== Production ==
The film was shot in Missouri in the city of Springfield, Missouri.

== Soundtrack ==
Texas music producer John Dickson composed the score.
