= RCVR =

- Genre: Science fiction Mystery; Paranormal; Period Drama
- Created by: David van Eyssen
- Written by: David van Eyssen; Brian Horiuchi
- Directed by: David van Eyssen
- Starring: Daniel Bonjour; Garrett Ryan; Catherine Kresge; Lexi DiBenedetto; Jacob Hopkins
- Composer: Rob Lord
- Country of origin: United States
- Original language: English
- No. of episodes: 6

Production
- Executive producers: David van Eyssen; Tavin Marin Titus; Jennifer Levine; Andy Shapiro
- Producers: David van Eyssen; Tavin Marin Titus
- Production locations: Los Angeles, United States
- Camera setup: Multi-camera
- Running time: 8-11 minutes
- Production company: Science To Fiction Transmedia

Original release
- Network: Machinima
- Release: September 21 – October 19, 2011

RCVR (pronounced Receiver) is a transmedia science fiction web series created for the Internet by producer-director David van Eyssen, which offers an explanation for the exponential growth in science and technology since the late 19th century. The series was also produced by Tavin Marin Titus through production company Science To Fiction. The original story on which RCVR was based was written by van Eyssen. Brian Horiuchi and van Eyssen wrote the first season of RCVR as a team.

The series premiered on Machinima on September 21, 2011 and met with critical acclaim and a user "like" rating of 96%. The show generated 2.6 million views in 14 days and approximately 6 million views by October 2011. The first season of RCVR is made up of 6 episodes each which are 6–9 minutes in duration. Cumulatively, the first season had a run-time of more than 46 minutes.

== Alternate Reality Gaming ==
Accompanying the premiere of the series was the launch of a corresponding blog "ProjectRCVR" and Twitter account linking the user to supplemental videos and commentary that formed part of an ARG (Alternate Reality Game) which challenged users to access a password-protected website containing the truth about human-alien encounters. At the conclusion of each episode, users were invited to "Discover The Truth" by subscribing to RCVR's Twitter account.

== Story ==
RCVR follows SIGMA agents Luke Weber, played by South-African born actor Daniel Bonjour, and Sandy Bergson played by Catherine Kresge, as they investigate and attempt to cover up alien encounters in 1973. The agents are also "RCVR hunters", tasked with tracking down individuals who possess valuable information channeled to them by extraterrestrial life-forms. In the series, these contactees are known as "receivers" or "RCVRs" (SIGMA's notation). But beyond the many technological advances that are used by corporations and governments for personal profit, RCVRs also carry fragments of a deeper knowledge—information suggesting that life can be extended indefinitely, that energy can be created without a fuel source and that time-travel is possible. Possession of this information makes RCVRs a powerful but dangerous commodity.

== Sponsorship ==
Motorola Mobility sponsored the first season of RCVR. The company's products and logo were integrated at key points in the series: In Episode 1 the Xoom tablet appears on a motel television; in Episode 3, models of the Xoom tablet, StarTAC phone and an oversized microprocessor are examined by Weber during his interview of a suspected contactee; in Episode 4, Sandy Bergson uses a prototype version of the DynaTAC phone which would not be commercially available until a decade later, in 1983; in Episode 5, the undercarriage of the alien mothership displays the Motorola "M" as it descends.

Simultaneously, the editor of "ProjectRCVR", Alvin Peters, announced that he had uncovered a relationship between Motorola and SIGMA. Users that obtained five sets of usernames and passcodes to enter SIGMA's official website shared Peters' discoveries. In the process of accessing hidden levels of SIGMA, users would also learn the truth about six UFO-related mysteries that have been the subject of controversy: Area 51, Roswell, Majestic 12, NASA, Kenneth Arnold and The Arkansas Incident (on which Season 1 is based). Alien-styled augmented reality devices that influenced the manufacture of Motorola technology since 1973, Google-maps references of sightings, and classified archive video and articles interactively extended the RCVR mythology.

== Score ==
The music for RCVR was composed by British composer Rob Lord and recorded in London, Paris and Los Angeles in 2011. The score features a number of unusual instruments including ondes Martenot, Cristal Baschet and Glass Harmonica played by French virtuoso musician Thomas Bloch plus a twelve piece choir, live string section, piano, guitars and basses often heavily treated and manipulated with electronic effects. Much of the composition and recording was started before filming commenced and was based on the script and discussions between Rob Lord and director David van Eyssen. The music was refined further during the edit period and final changes to the score were made during mix sessions for the film at Lotus Audio Santa Monica.

== Awards ==
In January 2012, RCVR was honored at the International Academy of Web Television Awards, held at the Venetian Hotel in Las Vegas, with three prizes: Best Dramatic Series (accepted by David van Eyssen), Best Male Lead (Daniel Bonjour) and Best Cinematographer (Joost van Starrenburg). The series received twelve nominations from the IAWTV.

== Episodes ==
- "Little Green Men" first aired September 21, 2011
- "Birdfall" first aired September 30, 2011
- "Dry Weather" first aired September 30, 2011
- "Mission Failure" first aired October 10, 2011
- "DCVR" first aired October 12, 2011
- "The Chosen" first aired October 19, 2011
