= My Magic =

- Theatrical release poster.
- Directed by: Eric Khoo
- Written by: Eric Khoo; Wong Kim Hoh
- Produced by: Tan Fong Chen; Wong Kim-hoh; Freddie Yeo; Gary Goh
- Starring: Bosco Francis; Jathisweran; Grace Kalaiselvi
- Cinematography: Adrian Tan
- Edited by: Siva Chandran; Lionel Chok
- Music by: Kevin Mathews; Christopher Khoo
- Production companies: Zhao Wei Films; Infinite Frameworks
- Distributed by: ARP Selection
- Release dates: 23 May 2008 (Cannes Film Festival); 25 August 2008 (Singapore)
- Running time: 75 minutes
- Country: Singapore
- Language: Tamil
- Budget: S$200,000
- Box office: US$19,940

My Magic is a 2008 Singaporean Tamil language drama film directed by Eric Khoo and produced by Zhao Wei Films in association with Infinite Frameworks. My Magic was the first Singapore film to be nominated for the Palme D'Or, the top award for film at the Cannes Film Festival. It has been also selected as Singapore's official entry for the Oscars in 2009. It was released in Singapore cinemas on 25 September 2008.

== Plot ==
A single father takes a job as a magician to provide for his son, only to be pressured into dangerous acts.

== Cast ==
- Bosco Francis
- Jathisweran as Rajr
- Grace Kalaiselvi
- Jason Lim
- Seet Keng-yew

== Reception ==
Derek Elley of Variety wrote that it "walks a thin line ... between sympathy with and exploitation of its main character's woes". Maggie Lee of The Hollywood Reporter called it a "one trick pony" that engages in schadenfreude and sentimentality instead of living up to the premise's possibilities as a heartbreaking father-son story.

Bosco Francis was named best actor at the Asian Festival of First Films.
