= Don't Do It (film) =

- Directed by: Eugene Hess
- Written by: Eugene Hess
- Produced by: Eugene Hess; Randy Lippert
- Starring: Heather Graham; James Le Gros; Sheryl Lee; Esai Morales; James Marshall; Sarah Trigger
- Cinematography: Ian Fox
- Music by: Hal Lindes
- Release date: November 10, 1994 (Germany)
- Running time: 90 minutes
- Country: United States
- Language: English

Don't Do It is a 1994 comedy film and the directorial debut of Eugene Hess who also wrote the screenplay. It stars Heather Graham, James Le Gros, Sheryl Lee and James Marshall.

== Plot ==
The film is about the secret desires of three young couples in Los Angeles: Suzanna and Dodger, Alicia and Robert, and Michelle and Charles. One member of each couple secretly falls in love with a former lover. Dodger is still attracted to his ex-girlfriend Alicia, while Alicia is pregnant with Robert's Child. Robert is still attracted to Michelle, whose boyfriend is Charles. Charles still loves Suzanna. Their real feelings come out when they meet at a café in Los Angeles.

== Cast ==
- Heather Graham as Suzanna
- James Le Gros as Dodger
- Sheryl Lee as Michelle
- Esai Morales as Charles
- James Marshall as Robert
- Sarah Trigger as Alicia
- Balthazar Getty as Jake
- Alexis Arquette as David

== Background ==
Heather Graham, Sheryl Lee and James Marshall previously starred together in the television series Twin Peaks and the following film Twin Peaks: Fire Walk With Me. Lee and Marshall also starred in the show's revival, alongside Balthazar Getty.
