= Out for a Kill =

- DVD cover
- Directed by: Michael Oblowitz
- Written by: Danny Lerner; Dennis Dimster
- Produced by: Steven Seagal; Danny Lerner; George Furla; Randall Emmett
- Starring: Steven Seagal; Corey Johnson
- Cinematography: Mark Vargo
- Edited by: Robert A. Ferretti
- Music by: Roy Hay
- Production companies: Millennium Films; Emmett/Furla Films
- Distributed by: Columbia Tristar Home Entertainment
- Release date: August 19, 2003
- Running time: 90 minutes
- Country: United States
- Language: English
- Budget: $14,000,000

Out for a Kill is a 2003 straight-to-video action film directed by Michael Oblowitz. It stars Steven Seagal.

== Plot ==
Wong Dai (Chooi Kheng Beh), an influential Chinese drug kingpin, sits at a long table in an old building in Paris, going through the motions of a gigantic merger between himself and several other major Chinese drug dealers.

Sai Lo (Hon Ping Tang) controls shipments in the French heroin market in Paris, using laundromats all over Paris as a front.

Tang "The Bird" Zhili (Bruce Wang) controls the entire New York drug conglomerate from the Chinatown section of New York City, and runs Mahjong gambling rackets.

Yin Quinshi (Dave Wong) of Sofia, Bulgaria, controls an Eastern European drug cartel.

Li Bo (Tom Wu) controls drug exports in Shanghai, China, and has a penchant for French restaurants.

Fang "The Barber" Lee (Ozzie Yue) controls a drug cartel in Paris, France, and he is known to hire unique assassins. And Mr. Chang (Chuke Chan) controls drug money in London, England. Yale University archaeology professor Robert Burns (Steven Seagal), who has just recently won the Winthrop Award for excellence in archaeology, stumbles onto the fact that his expedition to China, near the China / Kazakhstan border, is being used by Wong as a cover for a drug smuggling operation.

Realizing the danger of sticking around, Burns and his assistant, Luo Yi (Elaine Tan), make a run for it, but in the resulting gunfight, Yi is killed.

When Burns reaches the border, he finds that Wong's smugglers have set him up for smuggling the drugs. Burns lands in a Chinese prison, framed for drug running.

Burns is questioned by Chinese narcotics cop Tommie Ling (Michelle Goh) and DEA agent Ed Gray (Corey Johnson), who want to release him and use him as bait to nail the drug smugglers.

Burns, referred to by the Chinese drug barons as the "gweilo Professor", is quickly released and sent to the US, where he promises Yi's father Luo Dazhong (Vincent Wong) that he will get revenge for Yi's murder, but Wong is not done with Burns yet.

Wong sends hitmen to Burns's house in New Haven, Connecticut, to plant a bomb, which explodes and kills Burns's wife Maya (Kata Dobó).

With the two people closest to him dead at the hands of Wong and his minions, and with Tommie and Gray shadowing his every move, Burns is out for revenge.

As it turns out, Burns was not always a Professor. Burns was once a thief of Chinese artefacts, who served time in prison and earned his archaeology degree while in prison. He changed his name and married Maya after he was released.

With his determination to exterminate those who killed Maya, Burns tells Tommie and Gray to stay out of his way, as he cuts a bloody path through Chinatown and across Europe, on his way to a confrontation with Wong.

== Cast ==
- Steven Seagal as Professor Robert Burns
- Corey Johnson as DEA Agent Ed Grey
- Michelle Goh as Officer Tommie Ling
- Tom Wu as Li Bo
- Ozzie Yue as Fang "The Barber" Lee
- Bruce Wang as Tang "The Bird" Zhili
- Chike Chan as Mr. Chang
- Hon Ping Tang as Sai Lo
- Dave Wong as Yin Quinshi
- Chooi Kheng-Beh as Wong Dai (credited as Chooi Kheng Beh)
- Elaine Tan as Luo Yi
- Michael J. Reynolds as Dean
- Kata Dobó as Maya Burns (credited as Kata Dobo)
- Vincent Wong as Luo Dazhong
- Ray Charleson as Harry "Crash" Kupper
- Ganbaatar Tsevegjav as Mr. Tan

== Production ==
The film was one of two movies made by Seagal's own company, Luminosity Media, in association with Emmett/Furla Films Productions Corporation, a wholly owned subsidiary of Family Room Entertainment Corporation. The other film was Belly of the Beast.

Filming began in Eastern Europe on 15 September 2002. Actor Rachel Grant later claimed Seagal assaulted her during rehearsals for the film.

Stuntman actor Sam Cam Lui was awarded £10,000 after he was injured in a fight scene with Seagal during filming.

== Reception ==
Den of Geek wrote that "the special effects are dreadful; bad ideas that look cheap and unconvincing. The story follows as though the script was tossed into the air and the pages put back together in the wrong order. Fortunately, the tone is light and the silliness passes as good fun. There are a couple of great fight scenes, too. My favourite part of the film sees Seagal fighting a guy who bizarrely develops the ability to crawl along walls, mid-brawl. Obviously, Seagal smashes him to pieces regardless. We also get lots of scenes set in strip club, because of course, and plenty of Seagal shooting."

== Sexual assault allegation ==
On 15 January 2018, Rachel Grant publicly made a sexual assault allegation against Seagal, stating an incident took place in 2002, during pre-production on this film, and that she lost her job on the film after the incident. Seagal, who had been accused by other actresses of sexual assault in the past, denied these allegations.
