= 12 Lotus =

2008 Singaporean film

- Theatrical release poster
- Traditional Chinese: 十二蓮花
- Simplified Chinese: 十二莲花
- Hanyu Pinyin: Shí'èr liánhuā
- Directed by: Royston Tan
- Written by: Royston Tan; Liam Yeo
- Produced by: Seah Saw Yam; Mabelyn Ow; Lim Teck; Freddie Yeo
- Starring: Qi Yuwu; Liu Lingling; Mindee Ong
- Cinematography: Alan Yap
- Edited by: Low Hwee Ling
- Music by: Ricky Ho
- Production companies: Studio 10 Twenty-Eight Production; Mediacorp Raintree Pictures; Scorpio East Pictures; Infinite Frameworks
- Distributed by: Golden Village Entertainment
- Release date: 14 August 2008 (Singapore)
- Running time: 121 minutes
- Country: Singapore
- Languages: Mandarin; Hokkien
- Budget: S$$1.5 million
- Box office: S$983,000

12 Lotus (Chinese: 十二莲花) is a 2008 Singaporean musical drama film written and directed by Royston Tan, starring Qi Yuwu, Liu Lingling and Mindee Ong. The film was released in theatres on 14 August 2008 and was screened at the 13th Busan International Film Festival in October 2008. The film performed poorly at the local box office, grossing S$983,000 against a budget of S$$1.5 million.

== Plot ==
Spanning over the 1980s, 1990s till the present day, 12 Lotus tells the story of a singer who is constantly used and abused by the men in her life, against the backdrop of a string of melancholic Hokkien songs.

== Cast ==
=== Main and supporting ===
- Qi Yuwu as Ah Long / Long 2
- Liu Lingling as Older Liu Lianhua
- Mindee Ong as Liu Lianhua
- Huang Yiliang as Lianhua's father
- Hao Hao as Adult Xiao Feixia
- Li Bao En as Liu Lianhua (kid)
- Damus Lim as Xiao Feixia (kid)
- Aaron Tan as Young gambler / Ah Long's accomplice
- Yeo Yann Yann as Long 2's girlfriend
- Guo Min as Xiao Feixia's mother
- Auntie Fen as Opera actress
- Sam Loo as Getai host
- Amy Yang as Getai host
- Baobei Sisters as themselves
- Samantha Tan as Xiao Feixia's girlfriend
- Wang Yan Bin as Brother Tiger

The film also features the Sin Sai Feng opera troupe and the band Funkie Monkies Amps.

=== Special appearances ===
- Stefanie Sun as Goddess of Mercy (opera). Tan initially planned to have a real opera actress to play the role but eventually decided to cast Sun.
- David Gan as himself.

== Production ==
The film was shot in 23 days.

Sun's role as Goddess of Mercy was kept a secret and her scene was filmed at 3am on 1 March at a kampung set constructed on an open field in Paya Lebar. Due to the secrecy of her involvement, less than five crew members were on scene.

Sun's goddess costume was custom tailored for her and handsewn in Taiwan, costing $5,000 with Ong's lotus dress costing $6,000.

== Awards and nominations ==
Year	Awards	Category	Recipient	Result	Ref.
2008	45th Golden Horse Awards	Best Original Film Score	Ricky Ho	Nominated	
2009	22nd Singapore International Film Festival Awards	Best Director	Royston Tan	Won	
