= Tim Cox =

American film director

Abram Cox
- Occupations: Director; Screenwriter

Abram Cox (a.k.a. Tim Cox and T. Abram Cox) is a director, screenwriter and producer known for writing, directing and producing episodes of the Netflix original series Black Summer, which premiered in April 2019. Stephen King called it, “Existential hell in the suburbs, stripped to the bone.” The New York Times wrote, “If Andrei Tarkovsky and John Carpenter had teamed up to direct a zombie show, it might have looked something like this formally daring Netflix series.”

Previously Cox was lead director, writer, visual effects supervisor and co-executive producer on the long running Syfy Channel series Z Nation.

Feature credits include the comedy Miss Nobody, starring Leslie Bibb and Adam Goldberg. He began his directing career helming Sci Fi Pictures original films, including Alien Lockdown, Larva, and Mammoth, which was nominated for a visual effects Emmy Award.

He began his career as a storyboard artist for commercials and music videos.

== Selected credits ==
- Black Summer Season 1 (2019) (producer, director and writer)
- Z-Nation Season 4 (2018) (co-executive producer, director and writer)
- Z-Nation Season 3 (2017) (co-executive producer, director and writer)
- Z-Nation Season 2 (2016) (co- producer, director)
- Z-Nation Season 1 (2015) (director)
- Mammoth (2006) (director and writer)
- Larva (2005) (director)
- Alien Lockdown (2004) (director)
- The Man with No Eyes (2001) (director and writer)
- Miss Nobody (2010) (realisator)
