= VR Man =

Singaporean superhero television series

- Country of origin: Singapore
- No. of episodes: 13

Production
- Production company: MediaCorp

VR Man was a 13-episode live-action Singaporean superhero drama, aired in 1998. It was one of the first few English language dramas produced by MediaCorp, while VR Man was touted as "Singapore's first TV superhero".

== Cast and characters ==
- James Lye - Alex Foo / VR Man

VR Man, as the name suggests, has the ability to project virtual reality objects and 'solidify' them for a period of time, a power which is similar to that of the Green Lantern. VR Man calls these his "Virping" powers (Virtual Reality Projection), and these powers are limited by only his own imagination. Besides this primary ability, he also possess superhuman strength, durability, and speed: He can lift objects as heavy as a van, is impervious to most conventional firearms, and he can move at the speed of sound. He is also able to shoot neon-coloured lasers that incapacitate his targets. With the exception of Virping, which is bestowed by Click Click Man's procedure, all of his powers come from activating the Solidifier that he wears on his belt.

In some episodes, he gains new powers such as invisibility and telekinesis without explanation.

VR Man's sole weakness is a strobe light flashing at a particular speed. When exposed to it, his powers are deactivated, he changes back to Alex (which indicates that the VR Man costume is created through Virping, rather than an actual costume) and loses consciousness until the light is switched off. Although this weakness was accidentally discovered by Kristal's stalker, none of the other villains know about it except Bossman, therefore it is not exploited until the second half of the series.

- Lisa Ang - Bee Bee
- Michelle Goh - Kristal Kong
- Mark Richmond - Peter Chan / Click Click Man

== Plot ==
VR Man is the alter ego of computer engineer Alex Foo (James Lye). After a nearly fatal accident, Alex discovers that he has acquired superhuman powers which he later calls 'Virping'---virtual reality projection. His superhero alias 'VR Man' is coined (rather hastily) in Episode 2, after he saves his love interest Kristal Kong (Michelle Goh). His sidekick is Bee Bee (Lisa Ang), Alex's friend of fifteen years, who is secretly in love with him. The antagonist of the show is the bio-genetic engineer Peter Chan/Click Click Man (Mark Richmond), whom Alex suspects is responsible for him acquiring superhuman powers in the first place. In fact Click Click Man is the one who gave Alex his powers via an experimental procedure that killed all of its previous test subjects, but the project is shut down when Click Click Man is unable to prove that one of his subjects survived.

Most of VR Man's powers come from a device called the Solidifier which belongs to the organization that Click Click Man worked for. When his (unnamed) employer ended the project, a disgruntled Click Click Man stole the device from his laboratory and gave it to Alex for safekeeping, thinking that Alex will not figure out what it is. Afterwards, Click Click Man wants revenge on his employer and tries to take the Solidifier from Alex, at one point performing the same procedure on himself to obtain the same powers as VR Man.

In the first half of the series, Alex faces a different villain in each episode, ranging from robbers to terrorists to Kristal's stalker, while thwarting Click Click Man's attempts to recover the Solidifier. In the second half, VR Man encounters Click Click Man's former employer (who is never referred to by name; in the credits, he is known as "Bossman"). Having gained tremendous popularity as a superhero, VR Man appears on television more often and this allows Bossman and his henchmen to find him, eventually discovering his true identity. Like Click Click Man, Bossman's goal is to take the Solidifier from VR Man.

== Episodes ==
- 1. Fall into grace
- 2. A hero’s burden
- 3. Death by drinking
- 4. Hide and seek
- 5. Mother of mine
- 6. Showdown
- 7. Help me save me
- 8. No Plane Sailing
- 9. Hero No More
- 10. Gift of death
- 11. City of lost children
- 12. Discoveries
- 13. Destroy VR Man

== Reception and legacy ==
The Business Times criticised the show for failing "to exploit its full comic book potential because it is too busy taking its characters seriously", noting that VR Man is "hindered by (its) script". Despite this, the show rated higher in viewership than some episodes of The X-Files.

According to some critics, the show has been described as a "cringeworthy" guilty pleasure or "camp", and as one of the "worst", “memorably bad” and inadvertently "funniest show(s) on Singapore TV".

The Noose has spoofed the show, while a 2006 episode of Phua Chu Kang Pte Ltd was named after it. In February 2015, VR Man made a comeback cameo appearance in the animation TV series Heartland Hubby.
