= The Learning Curve =

2001 film by Eric Schwab

- Theatrical release poster
- Directed by: Eric Schwab
- Written by: Eric Schwab
- Produced by: Oscar Delgado
- Starring: Carmine Giovinazzo; Norbert Weisser; Monet Mazur; Vincent Ventresca; Tim Ransom; Rod Roesser
- Cinematography: Michael Hofstein
- Edited by: Adam C. Frank
- Music by: Zoran Borisavljevic
- Distributed by: Metro-Goldwyn-Mayer
- Release date: October 5, 2001
- Running time: 110 minutes
- Country: United States
- Language: English

The Learning Curve is a 2001 American thriller film about two Los Angeles nightclub scenesters who team up as con artists. It explores themes of ruthless ambition and its consequences. The film was directed by Eric Schwab, and stars Carmine Giovinazzo, Norbert Weisser, and Monet Mazur.

== Plot ==
Paul Cleveland (Carmine Giovinazzo) fights off Georgia's (Monet Mazur) attacker. A strong bond develops between the two and the ambition of Cleveland begins to surface rapidly as he starts to participate in scams with Georgia to raise enough money to leave his job as a hospital orderly behind. When they try to scam Marshal (played by Vincent Ventresca) by staging a road accident using Georgia as a distracting female hitchhiker it seems that they have struck a very dangerous individual as he produces a gun and kidnaps them.

Marshal is head of a record company and controls a very large financial empire and he takes Paul and Georgia to his offices where he eventually makes them an offer and congratulates them for their enterprise. The ambitious Cleveland then offers his further services to Marshal in a similar way to Bud Fox approaching Gordon Gekko in the film Wall Street The similarities between Gordon Gekko and Marshal are apparent as he begins to reward Cleveland for tasks accomplished. The empty warehouse that he gives them for Georgia and Paul to freely decorate and furnish is a similarity. Paul soon begins to become obsessed with how much Marshal needs him and begins to neglect Georgia in preference to Marshal's lucrative offers. Georgia also begins to become disenchanted with their lifestyle and this becomes the theme for the rest of the film as her ethics begin to clash with Marshal's organization and Paul's trance like obedience to him.
