= Miss Nobody (2010 film) =

2010 film directed by Tim Cox

- Film poster
- Directed by: Tim Cox
- Written by: Douglas Steinberg
- Produced by: Allan Jones; J. Todd Harris; Kathy Weiss
- Starring: Leslie Bibb; Adam Goldberg; Kathy Baker; Brandon Routh; Vivica A. Fox; Missi Pyle
- Cinematography: Mateo Londono
- Edited by: Chris A. Peterson
- Music by: John Dickson
- Release dates: June 10, 2010 (SIFF); September 27, 2011 (DVD)
- Running time: 90 minutes
- Country: United States
- Language: English

Miss Nobody is a 2010 American black comedy film directed by Tim Cox and written by Douglas Steinberg. The film stars Leslie Bibb as a mild-mannered secretary who murders her way up the corporate ladder. It also stars Adam Goldberg, Kathy Baker, Brandon Routh, Vivica A. Fox, and Missi Pyle.

Miss Nobody had its world premiere at the 36th Seattle International Film Festival on June 10, 2010. The film also screened at the 26th Boston Film Festival on September 18, 2010, where it won Best Actress for Bibb and Best Ensemble Cast.

== Plot ==
Sarah Jane McKinney has been working as a secretary at Judge Pharmaceuticals for years, and she's eager to earn better pay and more prestige. As a young girl, her alcoholic father was killed by a statue of Saint George that fell off a church. Ever since, she has looked to St. George as her guardian angel. When a junior executive position opens up at Judge, Sarah's friend Charmaine encourages Sarah to join her in applying for the job. Sarah's mother Claire helps her forge her resume, and Sarah ends up winning the job.

On her first full day of work, Sarah arrives at her office to find it being packed up by Milo Beeber. He explains that the Human Resources manager who promoted Sarah got fired, and Milo transferred in from corporate headquarters. Sarah consigns herself to being Milo's secretary. Charmaine coaches Sarah to go along with Milo's inevitable sexual advances as a way to get ahead. After a working dinner, Sarah goes back to Milo's apartment. She is horrified to find out that he is engaged and tries to ward off his advances. Milo chases her up a portable ladder. When Sarah shoves him away, Milo falls backwards and is impaled on an umbrella.

Sarah does not report his death and is promoted to Milo's position. Another executive at Judge, Nan Wilder confronts Sarah about Milo's death. Milo had texted Nan a picture of Sarah at his apartment. Knowing that Nan could report her to the police, Sarah decides to push her in front of an oncoming subway train. She soon receives a faxed picture showing her standing behind Nan on the subway platform. Believing that fax came from Pierre JeJeune, Sarah electrocutes him by activating the office's sprinkler system while Pierre is Xeroxing his butt in a kinky sex game.

Promoted into Pierre's position, Judge sends in a consultant, Morty Wickham, to help Sarah get a handle on her new job. Morty was Pierre's protege, and when he embarrasses Sarah at a corporate event, she decides to kill him. She severs the gas line to Morty's oven, and when he tries to light a bong, his house explodes. The string of deaths at Judge are being investigated by Detective Sergeant Bill Malloy who is also boarding at Sarah and Claire's house. Sarah and Malloy have begun dating, but she worries that he might be closing in on her.

She decides that she needs a fall guy and settles for Joshua Nether. She seduces Joshua and gains access to his personal information, which she uses to set up dummy accounts. Sarah embezzles money from Judge through the dummy accounts, setting everything up to look like Joshua is to blame. Malloy happens to see Sarah and Joshua leaving a restaurant after one of their dates and is heartbroken. When Malloy confronts Sarah about her betrayal, she thinks he is referring to the murders she has committed. She realizes he is referring to Joshua, and they reconcile.

After she poisons Joshua, Sarah is blackmailed by someone who claims that she knows about the embezzled money. Sarah quickly plots out who could be extorting her and various ways to kill them. She even poisons a jug of bottled water belonging to Mr. Ormsby, just in case (marking it with an x). It turns out that Charmaine is blackmailing Sarah. She was jealous of Sarah's promotion, and she was secretly behind most of the events that led Sarah to commit the series of murders. During their confrontation, Charmaine ends up chasing Sarah to the top of a bell tower, where Sarah causes Charmaine to fall to her death.

Thinking her troubles are behind her, Sarah gets engaged to Malloy and decides to try and do good deeds to balance out what she's done. At work, she asks L.J., her assistant, for a glass of water while she writes him a letter of recommendation. As she sips the water, L.J. explains that he had to get the water from Ormsby's office, and Sarah realizes the likelihood that it is the bottle which she'd poisoned. Asking L.J. to check if that bottle had an x marked on its cap, she nervously waits for his reply, while pondering the notion of karma and people getting what they deserve.

== Cast ==
- Leslie Bibb as Sarah Jane McKinney
- Kathy Baker as Claire McKinney
- Barry Bostwick as Father Grisham
- Mia Pollini as Young Sarah Jane
- Mark Irvingsen as Daddy (Earl McKinney)
- Christopher Carley as Frankie Sheftell
- Missi Pyle as Charmaine Abatemarco
- Geoffrey Lewis as Mr. Ketchum
- Brandon Routh as Milo Beeber
- David Monahan as 1st Man
- Larry Sullivan as 2nd Man
- Vivica A. Fox as Nan Wilder
- Sam McMurray as Hale Everwright
- Paula Marshall as Cynthia Bardo
- Richard Riehle as Leonard Ormsby
- Patrick Fischler as Pierre JeJeune
- Eddie Jemison as Joshua Nether
- Salvator Xuereb as Johnny Abatemarco
- Keir O'Donnell as L.J. Feffer
- Adam Goldberg as Bill Malloy
- David Anthony Higgins as Morty Wickham
- Charles Carroll as Mr. Tippet
- Shishir Kurup as Doctor Patuk
- Jazzmun as Snooks
- Hal B. Klein as Reporter
- Amie Barsky as Reporter

== Release ==
The film was released on DVD by Inception Media Group on September 27, 2011.
