= 4:30 =

- Theatrical poster
- Directed by: Royston Tan
- Written by: Royston Tan; Liam Yeo
- Produced by: Eric Khoo; Jacqueline Khoo
- Starring: Xiao Li Yuan; Kim Young-jun
- Cinematography: Leong Ching Lim
- Edited by: Low Hwee Ling
- Music by: Hualampong Riddim; Vichaya Vatanasapt
- Production companies: NHK; Singapore Film Commission; Zhao Wei Films
- Distributed by: Shaw Organisation (Singapore)
- Release dates: 17 December 2005 (NHK Asian Film Festival); 29 June 2006 (Singapore)
- Running time: 93 minutes
- Countries: Singapore; Japan
- Languages: Korean; Mandarin; English
- Budget: S$400,000

4:30 is a 2005 drama film directed by filmmaker Royston Tan and starring Xiao Li Yuan and Kim Young-jun. It is Tan's second feature after 15: the Movie. The film is made on a budget of S$400,000. It was released in Singapore on 29 June 2006. The film traces the relationship between Xiao Wu, an eleven year old chinese boy and his tenant Jung, a thirty-something Korean man. The movie's main theme is loneliness most prominently portrayed through Xiao Wu's character. Dialogue in the film included English, Mandarin and Korean.

The film participated in the 2005 NHK Asian Film Festival. It also won the Grand Prix Award for Best Film at the 2006 Bratislava International Film Festival, the Netpac Award at the 26th Hawaii International Film Festival, and the Best Film Award at the Rome Asian Film Festival.

== Plot ==
While waiting for his mother to return to Singapore from an overseas trip in Beijing, Xiao Wu has to share living space with a Korean man named Jung whom his mother had met while on a trip in Seoul. It is unknown what the relationship of Xiao Wu's mother and Jung is, but for whatever reason Xiao Wu's mother has allowed Jung to be the lone tenant in her house with Xiao Wu while she is away in Beijing on another trip. Xiao Wu sometimes receives calls from his mother checking up on him asking if he is eating and still has enough pocket money left.

Throughout the film, Jung does not communicate much with Xiao Wu and is shown to be a distant, depressed and suicidal character even once attempting to commit suicide by hanging in the kitchen and by later on by drowning himself in a bathtub. The source of his pain is never revealed in the film but it is implied that it has something to do with a woman. Xiao Wu on the other hand is a very lonely character as he does not have any friends at school, and often gets into trouble with teachers in his class. He longs for Jung's attention and spends most of his time doing various things to get it. Alone and trying to find various ways to entertain himself Xiao Wu develops various habits including going to clinics after school to obtain cough syrup bottles and drinking them, and playing with the house's indoor furniture and most notably sneaking into Jung's room at 4:30 am while Jung is deep asleep to rummage through his personal belongings in order to take away an item of his each night. Xiao Wu likes to collect an item from Jung's room and detail down the item in a book where he has compiled a list of things that he has taken from Jung as this is his way of finding out more about Jung and feeling closer to him.

One day Xiao Wu decides to sit beside Jung while he is smoking alone on some stairs and crying, Jung looks at him and says something in Korean while pointing to Xiao Wu's head and heart. Xiao Wu also starts to cry and leans on Jung's arm/shoulder. The following day Xiao Wu finds some Korean instant noodles on the dining table made by Jung for him. Jung has left a note with some Korean words on it which Xiao Wu subsequently collects and keeps in his book. Xiao Wu also cuts up a part of his clothing which is stained with Jung's tears from the night before and keeps it inside his book. Xiao Wu decides to make some orange juice for Jung and buys some ice cream for him as he had witness Jung buy the same ice cream from an ice cream vendor before and gets the flavors that Jung liked. He prepares these items and leaves it in front of Jung's room, waiting for Jung to come home at night.

After dozing of in his own room while waiting for Jung to return, Xiao Wu awakens in the middle of the night and walks into Jung's room to find that his room has been tidied and cleaned and blankets set up cleanly(implying that Jung has left). Xiao Wu panics and searches the house and staircase area aimlessly. He spends the next few days sitting under the house clock while hugging the book which contains all of Jung's memorabilia. Xiao Wu spends some of his nights after that staying up past 4:30 and rewinding the clock hands to that timing manually as he waits in futile for Jung to return someday. One day bored and restless Xiao Wu takes a flashlight in his hand and stands by the window and imagines Jung's hands holding his as he flashes light from it, Xiao Wu starts to cry as he comes to terms that Jung might never come back and he is left all alone. The film ends with ambiguity showing Xiao Wu closing some of the windows in the house and painting a coat of black over them as the film cuts to the closing credits.

== Cast ==
- Xiao Li Yuan as Xiao Wu
- Kim Young-jun as Jung

== Release ==
The film made its world premiere at the 56th Berlin International Film Festival in 2006.

== Critical response ==
Felix Cheong of Today gave it 4 out of 5 pluses.

== Adaption ==
On 20 June 2008, National Library Board and the National Book Development Council of Singapore launched the “Screen to Print” books where three chosen local films, 12 Storeys, Eating Air and 4.30 were adapted from screen to book. 4.30 was written by Yeo Wei Wei.
