= Mark Wiens =

American food vlogger (born 1986)

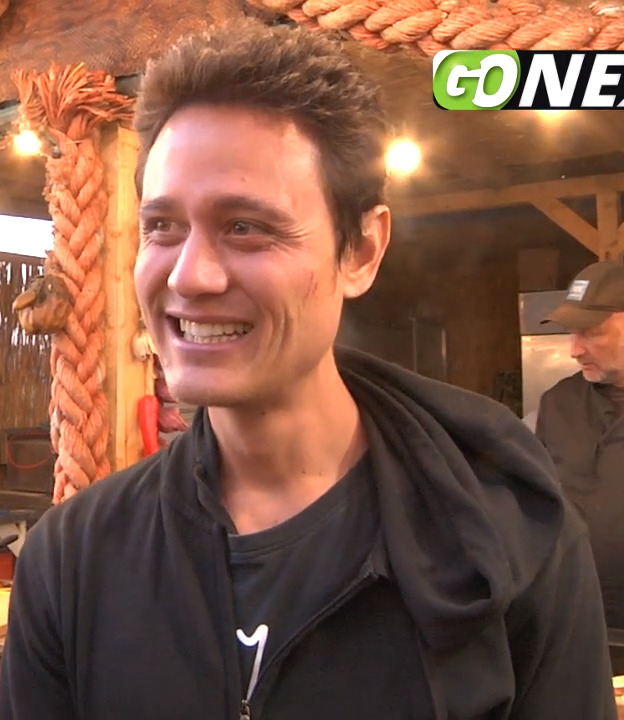
- Mark Wiens in 2019
- Born: February 26, 1986 (age 40); Phoenix, Arizona, United States
- Occupations: Food & Travel Vlogger
- Spouse: Ying Wiens (m. 2013)
- Children: 1

YouTube information
- Channel: Mark Wiens
- Years active: 2009–present
- Genres: Food and travel
- Subscribers: 11.7 million
- Views: 3.1 billion
- Last updated: Apr 23, 2026
- Website: migrationology.com

Mark Wiens (born February 26, 1986) is an American travel and food blogger, vlogger, YouTube personality, television host, restaurateur and businessman based in Bangkok, Thailand.

== Personal life ==
Wiens was born in Phoenix, Arizona, to a family of Christian missionaries. He is of German and Chinese descent, his Kansas-born father is of Plautdietsch Mennonite ancestry. His mother is from Hawaii within the group of Chinese descent. He has lived with his family in France, the Democratic Republic of the Congo, and Nairobi, Kenya. He attended Arizona State University, graduating in 2008 with a bachelor's degree in global studies. After graduation, Wiens traveled through South America and got a job teaching English in the mountains of Patagonia.

Wiens met his wife Ying while teaching English in Thailand. They were married in 2013. Their son Micah Wiens was born in 2016.

== Career ==
In 2009, Wiens started Migrationology.com, his food blog. In 2012, published an e-book, the Eating Thai Food Guide, and quit his job to begin blogging and making YouTube videos full-time. Wiens' travel vlog videos document his visits to dozens of countries. He has been featured as a Thai food expert by New York Magazine, CNN, and Andrew Zimmern.

In 2019, Wiens, along with Khun Tan (Thai food blogger), Khun Pongthep (designer and actor), Chef Gigg (Chef and Thai Iron Chef Champion) opened a restaurant, เผ็ดมาร์ค (Phed Mark), in Bangkok, specializing in phat kaphrao.

In 2020, Wiens launched "The Ultimate Bangkok Food Tour" in collaboration with Bangkok-based tour company bangkokvanguards.

In 2022, Wiens was the host of the HBO Asia series Food Affair with Mark Wiens. The series, made in partnership with the Singapore Tourism Board and directed by Eric Khoo, focused on Singaporean cuisine. The series ran for a single season.

== Filmography ==
Year	Title	Role	Notes
2022	Food Affair with Mark Wiens	Host	
2024	National Geographic: Epic Food Journeys with Mark Wiens	Host	

== Publications ==
- Bush, Austin; Wiens, Mark (2015). Thailand from the source : authentic recipes from the people that know them best (1st ed.). Footscray, Victoria, Australia. ISBN 978-1-74360-763-3. OCLC 893710272.
