= All She Ever Wanted =

- Theatrical Release Poster
- Genre: Drama
- Written by: David Hill
- Directed by: Michael M. Scott
- Starring: Marcia Cross; James Marshall; Leila Kenzle; Bruce Kirby; Carrie Snodgress; CCH Pounder; Tom Nowicki; Richard K. Olsen; Larry Black; Howard Kingkade; Ralph Wilcox; Robert Catrini; Robby Preddy; Nancy McLoughlin; Patricia Clay
- Music by: James Di Pasquale
- Country of origin: United States
- Original language: English

Production
- Executive producer: Carroll Newman
- Cinematography: Alan Caso
- Editor: Hughes Winborne
- Running time: 100 minutes
- Production companies: Carroll Newman Productions; Hearst Entertainment Productions

Original release
- Network: ABC
- Release: April 14, 1996

All She Ever Wanted is a 1996 American drama television film directed by Michael M. Scott and written by David Hill. It stars Marcia Cross as a young wife desperate for a child but cannot risk being pregnant because of the medication she must take to control her bi-polar disorder.

== Cast ==
- Marcia Cross as Rachel Stockman
- James Marshall as Tom Stockman
- Leila Kenzle as Jessie Frank
- Bruce Kirby
- Carrie Snodgress as Alma Winchester
- CCH Pounder as Dr. Marilyn Tower
- Tom Nowicki as Wesley Knight
- Richard K. Olsen as Judge Atwater
- Larry Black as Mr. Kelly
- Howard Kingkade as Dr. Danzer
- Ralph Wilcox as Hospital Security Guard
- Robert Catrini as Hospital Orderly
- Robby Preddy as Amy
- Nancy McLoughlin as Nurse Green
- Patricia Clay as Clara Fox
