= God's Gang =

Religious animated web series

- Genre: Action; Adventure
- Created by: Nimrod-Avraham May
- Directed by: Ehud Landsberg
- Countries of origin: United States; Singapore; Israel
- Original language: English
- No. of episodes: 8

Production
- Production companies: Infinite Frameworks; Candy Bear

Original release
- Network: YouTube
- Release: October 17, 2023 – present

God's Gang is an animated web series designed for children and young adults, created by Nimrod Avraham May. The series is centered on an interfaith team of superheroes, comprising four heroes from Muslim, Christian, Jewish, and Hindu backgrounds. It centers on themes of unity, friendship, and understanding.

== Background and development ==
May described creating God's Gang to bridge cultural and religious differences.

The series consists of an international production team, including executive producer Ronen Shani, producer Gilad Piker, director Ehud Landsberg, marketing officer Jon Sumroy and five-time Emmy and Grammy Award winning writer Rob Kutner. The series is supported by an interfaith committee comprising experts from the four different religious backgrounds.

On August 9, 2023, the completion of the pilot episode, "Love Is in the Air Hole", was announced. The production of the show's official trailer and pilot episode "Love Is in the Air Hole" was overseen by Singapore-based media company, Infinite Frameworks, and made possible through private investment.

The 2nd episode titled "What's Cooking" was released on July 17, 2024.

On December 3, 2024, the show's YouTube channel announced they had begun voice recordings for the 3rd episode. The episode, originally titled "We Didn’t Start The Fire: Wildfire & The Mysterious Hero" was released on February 19, 2025.

== Characters ==
The titular Gang cast consists of a Muslim (SuMuslim), a Christian (Chris Cross), a Jew (NinJew), a Hindu (TaekwonHindu), and in later episodes, a Buddhist (KungFuda). They are martial arts heroes empowered by 'The Almighty' to go on missions to bring down the world's villains. Each character uses their unique abilities to thwart the villains and execute a rescue mission. Interwoven into the storyline are elements of humor, including jokes, one-liners and subtle messages promoting themes of interfaith harmony, friendship, cooperation, and acceptance. These themes align with the broader objective of fostering unity and empathy among the show’s audience.

== Episodes ==
No.	Title	Original release date
1	"Cotton Candy Chaos (Note: Originally published as part 1 of "Love is in the Airhole", later retitled "Amusement Park Chaos!" and "The Cotton Candy Conspiracy".)"	September 12, 2023
2	"The Space Whales Mystery (Note: Originally published as part 2 of "Love is in the Airhole", later retitled "Blue Whales, Dark Waters & Alien Menace!" and "Blue Whales and Reptilian Ruses".)"	October 3, 2024
3	"Love in the Air?! (Note: Originally published as part 3 of "Love is in the Airhole", later retitled "Ultimate Power Unleashed: Ending The Alien Threat!" and "Love is in the Airhole".)"	October 13, 2024
4	"What's Cooking? (Note: This episode's title was temporarily changed to "The Religious Food Fight!")"	July 17, 2024
5	"Forest Trip Surprise (Note: Originally published as "We Didn’t Start The Fire: Wildfire & The Mysterious Hero", later retitled "Wildfire Chaos & the Rise of a Mystery Hero!" and "Mystery Ally in the Flames".)"	February 19, 2025
6	"KingFuda Training Day (Note: Originally published as "We Didn’t Start The Fire: Part 2", later retitled "Fearful to Fearless: Kungfuda Unlocks God's Gang's Powers" and "Trials of KungFuda".)"	March 11, 2025
7	"Tube Trouble (Note: Originally published as "We Didn’t Start The Fire: Part 3", later retitled "God's Gang Enters the Fear Zone; Nightmare Mode Activated!" and "Terror Tubes Activated".)"	March 25, 2025
8	"Big Brave Breath (Note: Originally published as "Epic Showdown of Light vs Darkness", later retitled "Epic Battle of Light and Darkness" and "The Breath of Courage".)"	April 9, 2025

== Reception ==
The online pilot episode attracted over 3 million viewers within three months of its release and 250,000 subscribers across social media platforms by December 2023.

The 2nd episode has approximately 122,000 views as of February 2025.
