= Mammoth (2006 film) =

2006 television film directed by Tim Cox

- Screenplay by: Sean Keller; Tim Cox; Brook Durham
- Story by: Don Guarisco
- Directed by: Tim Cox
- Starring: Vincent Ventresca; Summer Glau; Leila Arcieri; Cole Williams; Tom Skerritt
- Composer: John Dickson
- Country of origin: United States
- Original language: English

Production
- Executive producers: Chris A. Dantin; James R. Lewis; Tim Cox
- Producers: Tavin Marin Titus; Richard D. Titus
- Production locations: Baton Rouge, Louisiana, United States; Castel Film Studios, Bucharest, Romania
- Cinematography: Vivi Dragan Vasile
- Editor: Carsten Becker
- Running time: 90 minutes
- Production company: Plinyminor
- Budget: $2.3 million

Original release
- Network: Sci Fi Channel
- Release: April 22, 2006

Mammoth is a 2006 American science fiction comedy horror television film directed, co-written, and co-executive produced by Tim Cox. The film stars Vincent Ventresca, Summer Glau, Leila Arcieri, Cole Williams, and Tom Skerritt.

== Plot ==
Frank Abernathy is the curator of the natural history museum in Blackwater, Louisiana. He is a widower who doesn't seem to have time for his daughter, Jack. Frank's father, Simon; is a B-movie enthusiast who believes in extraterrestrials and shows his favorite movies at the local theater. The city loses its electrical power just as Simon, Jack, and her boyfriend Squirrelly exit the theater. They watch an object streaking through the sky and crashing into the museum. Thought to be a meteorite, they later find out it is a craft containing an alien lifeform. Trying to adapt to the Earth's atmosphere, it latches on to the first organism it finds - the museum's most notable exhibit, a frozen woolly mammoth.

A security guard witnesses the revival of the prehistoric elephant, which kills the guard. With the creature on the loose, two government agents, Powers and Whitaker; track Frank down. While the agents and Frank try to figure out what happened and what to do, the mammoth heads into the forest; where it kills anyone it comes across. The beast's path soon brings it to a huge party attended by Jack and Squirrelly.

They survive the attack and meet up with Frank and the agents. The mammoth suddenly appears and kills Agent Whitaker while Agent Powers, Frank, Jack, and Squirrelly escape. While the mammoth continues its rampage around the town, the government is preparing to detonate a nuclear bomb on the alien-possessed elephant. The group must find a way to take the creature down without destroying their town.

After devising a plan to stop the mammoth, Frank, Powers, Jack and Squirrelly are joined by Simon and town sheriff Marion Morrison at the local factory to encase the creature in ice, just like it was before. While en route, Squirrelly is killed by the mammoth, but the plan moves forward at full speed. The mammoth arrives at the factory and is doused in molten steel. Unfortunately, the liquid metal is ineffective as the beast slaughters Sheriff Morrison offscreen. They figure out that liquid nitrogen is the only way to stop the mammoth once and for all. The mammoth is lured into the liquid nitrogen trap. Frank, Jack, and Powers; among other survivors, escape as Simon sacrifices himself to pull the release valve and smash the controls, forcing the liquid nitrogen to spray out and freeze both Simon and the mammoth.

The movie ends as Simon's frozen body is put in government hands, and the refrozen mammoth is put back out as an exhibit.

== Cast ==
- Vincent Ventresca as Frank Abernathy
- Summer Glau as Jack Abernathy
- Tom Skerritt as Simon Abernathy
- Cole Williams as Squirrelly
- Charles Carroll as Sheriff Marion Morrison
- Leila Arcieri as Agent Powers
- Marcus Lyle Brown as Agent Whitaker
- Mark Irvingsen as Deputy Dino
- David Kallaway as Deputy Bud
- Andrew Peter Marin as Floyd
- Constantin Drăgănescu as Gordon
- Dan Radulescu as Moe the Monkey Man
- Karen Parden Johnson as Gas Station Lady
- Coca Bloos as Olive
- Boris Petroff as Bruno
- Julia Lashae as Tour Guide

== Awards and nominations ==
| Year | Award | Category | Nominees | Result | Ref. |
|---|---|---|---|---|---|
| 2006 | 58th Primetime Creative Arts Emmy Awards | Outstanding Special Visual Effects for a Miniseries, Movie or a Special | Christian Bloch; Stefan Bredereck; Elizabeth Castro; Scott Dewis; Armen V. Kevorkian; Jonathan Spencer Levy; David R. Morton; Matt Scharf; Jason Michael Zimmerman | Nominated | |
