= Zombie Dogs =

- Directed by: Toh Hai Leong
- Produced by: Fong Cheng; Eric Khoo
- Starring: Toh Hai Leong
- Cinematography: Jimmy Tai
- Edited by: Chew Tze Chuan
- Release date: 30 April 2004
- Running time: 63 minutes
- Country: Singapore
- Language: English

Zombie Dogs is a 2004 Singaporean mockumentary film directed by Toh Hai Leong. It criticises aspects of Singaporean life. The film discusses behavioural dysfunction in the facet of both anomie and alienation in Singaporean culture.

== Plot ==
A film director films a snuff film, airing his grievances about being a Singaporean in the process.

== Cast ==
- Toh Hai Leong as himself
- Lim Poh Huat as himself

== Release ==
The film premiered on 30 April 2004 in the Singapore History Museum as part of the Singapore International Film Festival.

== Reception ==
Tay Yek Keak of The Straits Times gave the film four stars out of five, calling it "a surprisingly good part-documentary, part-film piece of work that starts out looking like an indictment of Singapore's artless soul but ends up harbouring the sad story of a man living on the margin of society."
