= Vibrations (film) =

- Directed by: Michael Paseornek
- Written by: Michael Paseornek
- Produced by: John Dunning; Dan Lieberstein; André Link; Tami Lynn
- Starring: James Marshall; Christina Applegate; Faye Grant; Paige Turco; Scott Cohen; Bruce Altman; Steven Keats; Shane Butterworth; Dennis Ostermaier
- Cinematography: Michael Slovis
- Edited by: Pamela Scott Arnold
- Music by: Bob Christianson
- Release date: July 2, 1996
- Running time: 104 minutes
- Country: United States
- Language: English

Vibrations is a 1996 film directed and written by Michael Paseornek.

== Plot ==
Vibrations follows the story of TJ Cray, an up-and-coming rock star in the making. On his way to the big city to audition for an A&R man and secure a record deal, his car is hit by a car load of drunks who then use heavy machinery to sever his hands. With his hands gone TJ falls out of the music business and becomes a homeless drunk with plastic hands. TJ Cray believes all is lost until one night he is awoken in the dirty warehouse he sleeps in by a pulsating rhythmic beat. There's an illegal rave party in the warehouse and TJ is found by Anamika, a computer artist, who takes him outside for fresh air. They become good friends after TJs plastic hands help him stop Anamika getting raped by knife wielding rave thugs. Anamika introduces TJ to her friends, including Geek, who replace TJs plastic hands with metal robot piano playing hands. Eventually TJ has a metallic cyber suit made for him and he pioneers electronic music, becoming an overnight sensation known as Cyberstorm.

== Reception ==
Upon release Vibrations initially bombed. However, the film was one of the first films to be released on DVD.
