= James Marshall (actor) =

American actor (born 1967)

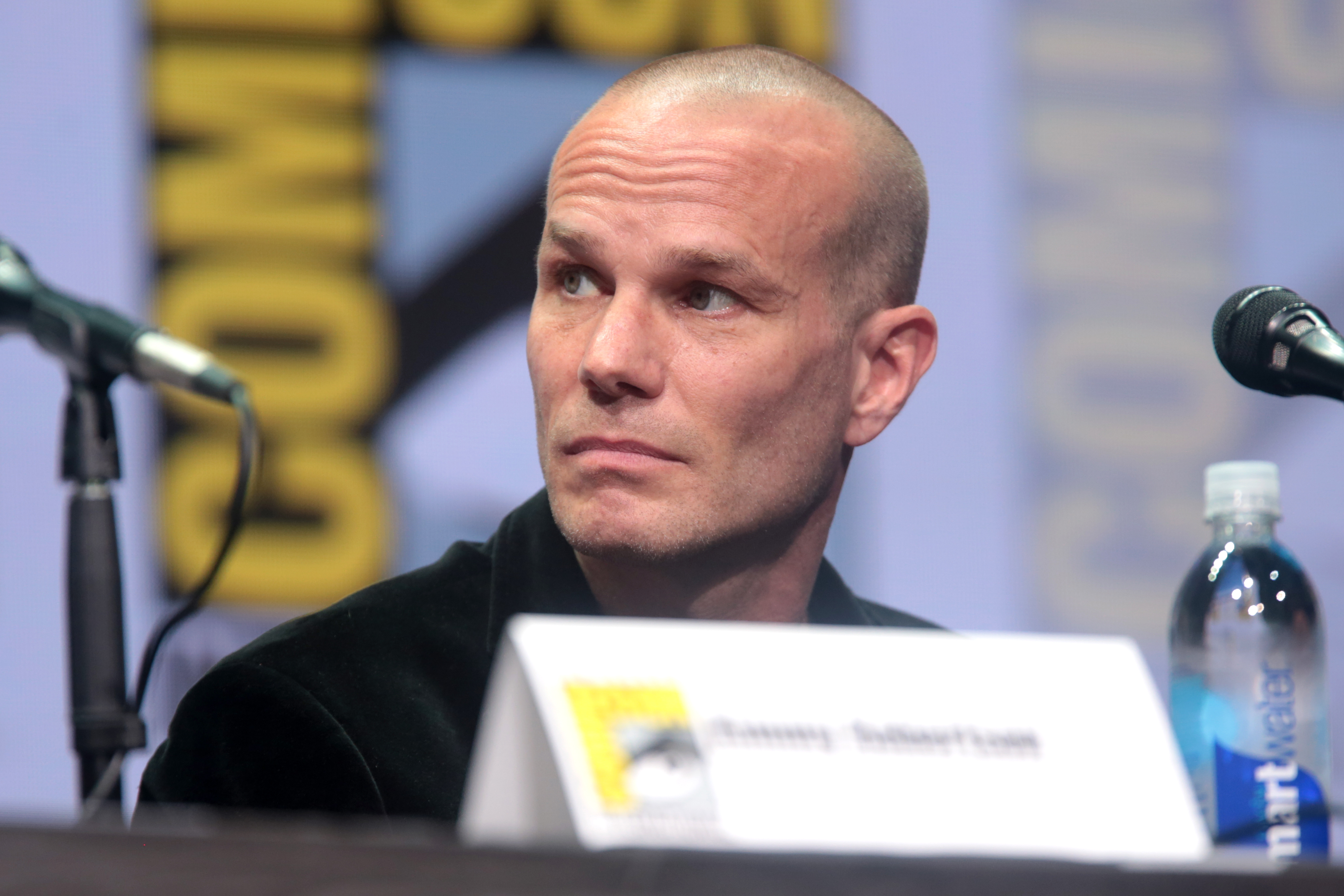
- Marshall in 2017
- Born: James David Greenblatt; January 2, 1967 (age 59); New York City, United States
- Other names: James Marchall; James L. Marshall
- Occupations: Actor, songwriter, musician
- Years active: 1985–present
- Spouse: Ana Marshall (m. 1991; div. 1993) Renee Griffin (m. 1998)
- Children: 2

James David Greenblatt (born January 2, 1967), best known as James Marshall, is an American actor, known for playing the character James Hurley in the television series Twin Peaks (1990–1991), its 1992 prequel film Twin Peaks: Fire Walk with Me, and its 2017 revival, and for his role as Private Louden Downey in A Few Good Men (1992).

== Early life ==
Marshall was born in Queens, New York. His father, William R. Greenblatt, was a Radio City Music Hall publicist, and his mother, Charlotte Green, danced with The Rockettes as Charlotte Bullard. The family moved from New Jersey to California in the 1980s. Marshall has one sister, Kat Green, a music and film producer.

== Career ==
Marshall's feature debut film was the Charlie Sheen vehicle, Cadence (1990). He played the lead role in Gladiator (1992). Since then, Marshall has appeared in numerous films: Hits! (1994), Vibrations (1996), All She Ever Wanted (1996), Criminal Affairs (1997), Soccer Dog: The Movie (1999), Luck of the Draw (2000), alongside Naomi Watts in Down (2001) and Alien Lockdown (2004). He also provided the voice for Kurt in the video game Unlimited Saga.

== Personal life ==
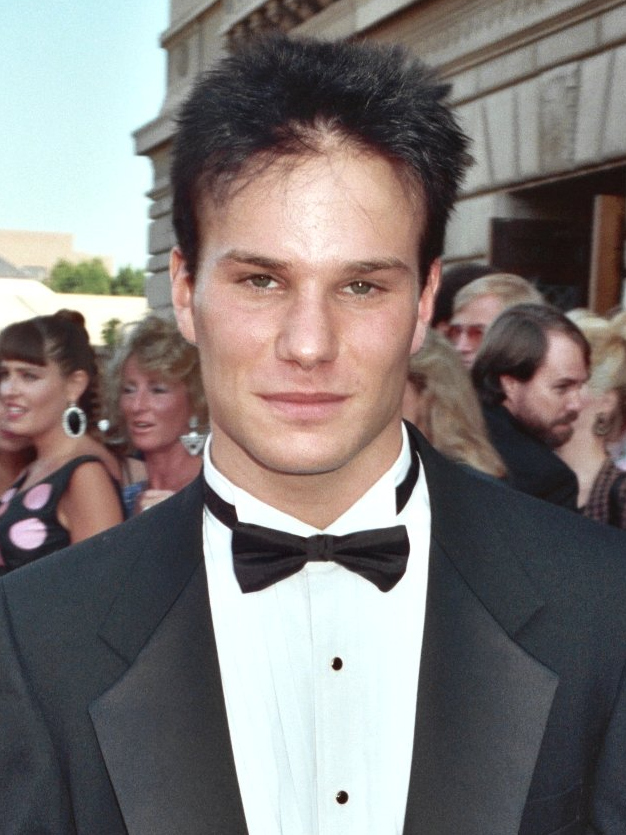
Marshall in 1990

Marshall is married to actress Renee Griffin, with whom he has a son and a stepson.

In summer 2010, Marshall sued the pharmaceutical company Hoffmann-LaRoche (a unit of Roche Holding AG) for $11 million in damages for injuries which, he claimed, resulted from his taking the drug Accutane. He claimed he had suffered Accutane-related gastrointestinal distress so severe that it necessitated a four-month hospital stay and the surgical removal of his colon. He argued that these injuries had derailed his acting career. Stars Martin Sheen (a longtime family friend), Brian Dennehy, Esai Morales and Rob Reiner (Marshall's director on A Few Good Men) were to testify on his behalf. Marshall's case against Hoffmann-LaRoche was ultimately unsuccessful.

His health now substantially improved, Marshall has begun a new career as a musician.

== Filmography ==
=== Film ===
Year	Title	Role	Note
1990	Cadence	Corporal Harold Lamar	
1992	Gladiator	Tommy 'The Bridgeport Bomber' Riley	
1992	Twin Peaks: Fire Walk with Me	James Hurley	
1992	A Few Good Men	Private Louden Downey	
1994	Hits!	Dommy	
1994	Don't Do It	Robert	
1996	Vibrations	T.J.	
1997	Criminal Affairs	Mark	
1999	Soccer Dog: The Movie	Alden	
2000	Luck of The Draw	Jack Sweeney	
2000	Doomsday Man	Tom	
2001	Down	Mark Newman	
2002	High Crimes	Law Court Door Guard	Uncredited
2005	Come As You Are	Ryan	
2010	The Cursed	Bill Fisher	
2011	In the Eyes of a Killer	The Sheriff	
2016	Badlands of Kain	PJ	

=== Television ===
Year	Title	Role	Notes
1985	Murder, She Wrote	Student #3	Episode: "School for Scandal"
1986–1989	CBS Schoolbreak Special	Willie Willens / Doug Simpson / Joey	3 episodes
1987	Into the Homeland	Skateboard Boy	TV movie
1989	Nightbreaker	Barney Immerman	TV movie
1989	China Beach	Kanaski / Grunt	2 episodes
1989–1991	Growing Pains	Kevin Randall / Stage Manager / Bob /	7 episodes
1990–1991	Twin Peaks	James Hurley	Lead role; 23 episodes
1995	She Stood Alone: The Tailhook Scandal	'Stick'	TV movie
1995	The Unspoken Truth	Clay	TV movie
1996	All She Ever Wanted	Tom Stockman	TV movie
1996	Vibrations	T.J.	TV movie
1997	The Ticket	Keith Reicker	TV movie
2000	The Hunger	Nicky	Episode: "The Sacred Fire"
2002	My Adventures in Television	Steve	Episode: "Fired"
2003	CSI: Crime Scene Investigation	Gary Quinn	Episode: "Invisible Evidence"
2004	Alien Lockdown	Charlie Dryfus	TV movie
2016	Baked Ziti	Walter Kowalski	Short film
2017	Twin Peaks	James Hurley	Revival; 5 episodes
2022	The Pact	Kane	5 episodes
