= Leila Kenzle =

American therapist and former actress

- Born: July 16, 1960 (age 65); Patchogue, New York, U.S.
- Education: Rutgers University–New Brunswick (BFA); Antioch University (MA)
- Years active: 1989–2003
- Spouse: Neil Monaco (m. 1994)

Leila Kenzle (born July 16, 1960) is an American therapist and former actress best known for her role as Fran Devanow on Mad About You.

== Early life and education ==
Leila Kenzle was born in Patchogue, New York, the daughter of Lee, an antiques dealer, and Kurt Kenzle, who worked in electrical supply sales. She earned a Bachelor of Fine Arts degree from the Mason Gross School of the Arts at Rutgers University–New Brunswick in 1984. In 2002, she earned a Master of Arts in psychology from Antioch University Los Angeles.

== Career ==
Before moving to Los Angeles to become an actress she worked as a hotel telephone operator. Her big break came when she was cast as a stripper in the off-Broadway production of Tony n' Tina's Wedding. Her TV credits include appearances on The Golden Girls, Diagnosis: Murder, Thirtysomething and The Cosby Show. Her film credits include Other People's Money, White Oleander, and The Hot Chick. Her final role to date was in the 2003 movie Identity.

After Mad About You ended, she obtained a master's degree in clinical psychology and is a marriage and family therapist practicing in Los Angeles.

== Personal life ==
Kenzle has been married to Neil Monaco, a private acting coach, since 1994.

== Filmography ==
=== Film ===
Year	Title	Role	Notes
1991	Other People's Money	Marcia	
2000	Enemies of Laughter	Woman #1	
2002	White Oleander	Ann Greenway	
2002	The Hot Chick	Julie	
2003	Identity	Alice York	

=== Television ===
Year	Title	Role	Notes
1989	The Cosby Show	Girl #2	Episode: "Theo's Woman"
1990	The World According to Straw	Gina DeSalvo	Television film
1990	The Golden Girls	Tamara	Episode: "Blanche Delivers"
1990	Thirtysomething	Student #1	Episode: "The Guilty Party"
1990	Over My Dead Body	Hooker	Episode: "A Passing Inspection"
1991	Princesses	Debra Kirshner	3 episodes
1992–1999	Mad About You	Fran Devanow	136 episodes
1995	Something Wilder	Lena	Episode: "For the Boys"
1995	Friends	Fran Devanow	Episode: "The One with Two Parts: Part 1"
1996	All She Ever Wanted	Jesse Frank	Television film
1996, 2000	Diagnosis: Murder	Various roles	2 episodes
1997	Duckman	Janeane	Episode: "Ebony, Baby"
1997	Breast Men	Arlene	Television film
1998	The Nanny	Naomi Demble	Episode: "The Reunion Show"
1998–1999	DiResta	Kate DiResta	9 episodes
1999	Love American Style	Julie	Television film
1999	The Wonderful World of Disney	Amy	Episode: "Dogmatic"
1999	The Wild Thornberrys	Bobri / Arctic Hare	2 episodes
2001	The Wild Thornberrys: The Origin of Donnie	Squirrel / Forest Animal	Television film
2001	Touched by an Angel	Leigh Alcott-Rendon	Episode: "Angels Anonymous"
2002	Felicity	Attorney	Episode: "The Paper Chase"
2003	Judging Amy	Mrs. McKinney	Episode: "Looking at Quarters"
2003	Rugrats	Tracy	Episode: "Club Fred"
