= Vincent Ventresca =

American actor

- Born: Vincent Paul Gerard Ventresca; April 29, 1966 (age 60); Indianapolis, Indiana, U.S.
- Education: Indiana University Bloomington
- Occupations: Actor; writer; producer
- Years active: 1991–present
- Spouse: Dianne Shiner (m. 1995)
- Children: 2

Vincent Paul Gerard Ventresca (born April 29, 1966) is an American actor, perhaps best known for portraying Darien Fawkes on Sci-Fi's The Invisible Man, and Professor Jack Reed on NBC's Boston Common. Ventresca is also known for his guest starring role as Fun Bobby on NBC's Friends.

== Early life ==
Ventresca was born in Indianapolis, Indiana, the youngest of eleven siblings. He attended Bishop Chatard High School. He graduated from Indiana University Bloomington with a double major in theater and psychology. In 1995, he married Dianne Shiner; they have two children.

== Career ==
He starred as Darien Fawkes on Sci-Fi's 2000 TV series The Invisible Man for two seasons and as Professor Jack Reed on NBC's Boston Common, also for two seasons. He also had a recurring role on the Nickelodeon series True Jackson, VP and as Monica Geller's boyfriend, "Fun Bobby", on Friends. He has guest starred on Cold Case, CSI: Miami, Las Vegas, Without a Trace, Monk, Criminal Minds, and Maggie Winters.

His film credits include Romy and Michele's High School Reunion, The Thin Pink Line, Can't Stop Dancing, Love & Sex, The Learning Curve, Dead & Breakfast, and Mammoth.

He has appeared in several stage productions, such as Choices.

== Filmography ==
=== Film ===
Year	Title	Role	Notes
1997	Romy and Michele's High School Reunion	Billy Christianson	
1997	Looking for Lola	Tony	
1998	Saving Private Ryan	Soldier on Beach	
1998	The Thin Pink Line	Bob	
1999	Can't Stop Dancing	Chuck Levine	
1999	This Space Between Us	Sterling Montrose	
1999	The Learning Curve	Marshal	
2000	Love & Sex	Richard Miltner	
2002	Robbing 'Hef	James	
2003	Purgatory Flats	Thomas Reed	
2004	Dead & Breakfast	Doc Riley	
2005	Madison	Walker Greif	
2008	Sorry	Robin Tasker	Short film
2011	Bad Actress	Morris Pillage	
2011	Answers to Nothing	Erik	
2012	Should've Been Romeo	Matt	
2014	Break Point	Gary	
2015	Hangman		
2016	Tao of Surfing	El Gringo	

=== Television ===
Year	Title	Role	Notes
1991	The Fresh Prince of Bel-Air	Alex	Episode: "She Ain't Heavy"
1991	Reasonable Doubts	Scott Olkum	Episode: "Dicky's Got the Blues"
1993	Life Goes On	Bates	Episode: "Lost Weekend"
1993	Empty Nest	Police Officer	Episode: "Two for the Road"
1993	The Torkelsons	Dave	Episode: "To Date or Not to Date?"
1993	Blossom	Grant	Episode: "Sitcom"
1994	Monty	Reporter	Episode: "My Dad Could Beat Up Your Dad"
1994	Menendez: A Killing in Beverly Hills	Nick	Television film
1995	The Surrogate	Eric Shaw	Television film
1995	Degree of Guilt	Richie Argos	Television film
1995	Crazy Love	John Stratton	Unaired pilot
1995	Medicine Ball	Tom	Episode: "Wizard of Bras"
1995	Diagnosis: Murder	Johnny Meslofski	Episode: "My Baby Is Out of This World"
1994–96	Friends	Fun Bobby	2 episodes
1996–97	Boston Common	Prof. Jack Reed	31 episodes
1998	Maggie Winters	Bobby Campanella	5 episodes
1998	Prey	Dr. Ed Tate	13 episodes
1999	Jack & Jill	Danny Hallahan	2 episodes
2000–02	The Invisible Man	Darien Fawkes	46 episodes
2002	Couples	Arthur	Television film
2002	The Twilight Zone	Matt McGreevey	Episode: "Shades of Guilt"
2003	Cold Case	Dr. Bennett Cahill	Episode: "Love Conquers Al"
2003	Vegas Dick	Dicky Barrett	Television film
2003	Las Vegas	Elliot	Episode: "Pros and Cons"
2004	CSI: Miami	Joseph Zellar	Episode: "Invasion"
2004–05	Complete Savages	Jimmy Savage	16 episodes
2005	MorphMan	Dr. Eli Rudkus	Television film
2006	Mammoth	Dr. Frank Abernathy	Television film
2007	Monk	Rob Sherman	Episode: "Mr. Monk and the Birds and the Bees"
2008	In Plain Sight	Vernon McRoy	Episode: "Hoosier Daddy"
2009	The Beast	Roman Petrescu	Episode: "Nadia"
2009	Stuck	Vince	Television film; also writer and producer
2009	Without a Trace	David Morgan	Episode: "Daylight"
2009	The Mentalist	Duncan Weaver	Episode: "Red Bulls"
2009	My Neighbor's Secret	Jason Hest	Television film
2009	Dollhouse	Nolan Kinnard	3 episodes
2009–11	True Jackson, VP	Mr. Jeff Jamerson	3 episodes
2010	$#*! My Dad Says	Samson	Episode: "Easy, Writer"
2011	Hot in Cleveland	Dr. Doug	Episode: "Unseparated at Birthdates"
2011	Memphis Beat	Jimmy Wagner	Episode: "Troubled Water"
2012	CSI: NY	Ron Ferguson	Episode: "Who's There?"
2013	CSI	Connor Durman	2 episodes
2013	Flying Monkeys	James	Television film
2013	Nikita	Trevor Adrian	2 episodes
2014	Psych	James Earl Craig	Episode: "A Touch of Sweevil"
2014	Franklin & Bash	Officer Mueller	Episode: "Good Cop/Bad Cop"
2015	Rizzoli & Isles	Dr. Carlson	Episode: "Deadly Harvest"
2015	Wicked City	Jimmy Lovett	3 episodes
2016	Nashville	Vincent Pearce	Episode: "Maybe You'll Appreciate Me One Day"
2016	Kings of Con	Officer Billings	Episode: Pasadena, CA
2017	Lifeline	Harry	2 Episodes
2018	The Fosters	Henry Mullen	Episode: "Scars, Meet the Fosters"
2018	Volunteers, a Rwandan Comedy	Vincent	Television film
2018	9-1-1	Coach	Episode: 7.1
2020	Criminal Minds	Louis "Louie" Chaycon	Episode: Ghost
2022	The Rookie	Todd Shelf	Episode: The List
