= 881 (film) =

2007 Singaporean musical comedy-drama film

- Theatrical poster
- Directed by: Royston Tan
- Written by: Royston Tan
- Produced by: Daniel Yun; Eric Khoo; Gary Goh; James Toh; John Ho; Mike Wiluan
- Starring: Qi Yuwu; Yeo Yann Yann; Mindee Ong; Liu Lingling
- Cinematography: Daniel Low
- Edited by: Low Hwee-Ling
- Music by: Funkie Monkies Productions; Poh Tiong-Cai; Robert Mackenzie
- Production companies: Mediacorp Raintree Pictures; Media Development Authority of Singapore; Zhao Wei Films; Scorpio East Pictures; Infinite Frameworks
- Distributed by: Golden Village Pictures
- Release date: 9 August 2007
- Running time: 105 minutes
- Country: Singapore
- Languages: Mandarin; Hokkien
- Budget: S$1 million

881 is a 2007 Singaporean musical-comedy-drama film written and directed by Royston Tan, based on the Singapore getai scene. It is the second Singaporean film that has been released in Japan.

By 13 September 2007, the film had grossed over S$3 million, making it the top grossing Asian film in Singapore in 2007. It was screened at the Busan International Film Festival in South Korea, and was in competition at the 2007 World Film Festival of Bangkok. The film was also accepted as Singapore's selection for Academy Award for Best Foreign Language Film. The film was submitted to the 44th Golden Horse Awards by Mediacorp, and received a nomination for best makeup and costume design.

== Plot ==
Guan Yin narrated how the Papaya Sisters were born in 1982: Big Papaya did well in school, while Small Papaya struggled with life and would die of cancer at age 25. One fateful day during the Ghost Festival they began their career as a Getai duo after watching a performance by Chen Jin Lang.

The Papaya Sisters sought performance advice from Aunt Ling's friends Wang Lei, Karen Lim and Kelvin Tan, who asked Aunt Ling to visit her twin sister, the 'Goddess of Getai', for blessings. Aunt Ling revealed that she had been on hiatus from her Getai career for 20 years, before visiting the temple to seek the Goddess. After Ling was wrapped in the Goddess' robe for abusing, the sisters begged the Goddess for talents to perform on stage. The Goddess granted them the voices of the legendary Pearl Sisters along with a magical feather each, with conditions to respect the spirits, getai and people alike, and refrain from speaking vulgarities and having relationships with men.

After their debut performance, Big Papaya's mother banished her from the house, having discovered that she was performing at getai even though she was forbidden to. Big Papaya subsequently moved in with Aunt Ling, Guan Yin and Little Papaya. After seeing Chen performing in a wheelchair, the Papaya Sisters started raising funds for Chen's medical fees. The following day, Aunt Ling's friends were reading the newspaper at the Hawker centre. Wang hid the newspaper from Aunt Ling but Aunt Ling demanded to see it: the headline mentioned Chen won the second prize in the 4-Digits lottery before he died last night.

Big Papaya was still depressed since her banishment from her house, and kissed Guan Yin, even though the Goddess had forbidden it. On the fifteenth day, the whole household enjoyed a feast and prayed to the spirits. They performed a song while sharing the fa gao. Small Papaya was later revealed to be taking steroids (administrated by a doctor) to keep her strength going, but kept this from the rest of the family. In Guan Yin's car, Guan Yin gave a miniature paper flower to Small Papaya and she drew her favourite crescent moon on his palm with the flower in the middle. He clasped her hands but she drew away.

Later, the Sisters were trying new costumes. Small Papaya's dress was very loose and Aunt Ling asked Guan Yin to retake her measurements. Big Papaya and Guan Yin discovered the plaster on Small Papaya's arm from the steroid injection. She asked them to keep her condition from Aunt Ling.

Another getai duo who ironically speak Mandarin poorly (the Durian Sisters) is introduced. They were intensely jealous of the Papaya Sisters and criticized the performances in the car, but their manager (Steve Lee) comforted them with a strategy to sabotage the Papaya Sisters' future performances, by reaching the stage first and preventing the sisters from performing. After a number of chases between the Sisters to Xian Yi stage, a performance stage featuring Wang Lei, the Papaya Sisters accused the Durian Sisters of cutting the queue. This led to a fight only stopped by their respective managers. Aunt Ling confronted the Durian Sisters' manager and was backed by the stage manager. The Durian Sisters left the site, warning that they would do whatever it took to perform at the Getai.

The following day, Aunt Ling and the Papaya Sisters visited another temple to curse the Durian Sisters through villain hitting. Big Papaya returned home to give her parents money as appreciation, but was rejected by her mother who silently threw the money back at her note by note. Big Papaya's mother did not appreciate her getai career despite her singing talent; Big Papaya's father told her not to worry, before proceeding to persuade her mother, revealing that her mother herself used to be a Getai singer.

At the next Getai performance, the Durian Sisters reached the stage first and attacked the Papaya Sisters with shurikens, accompanied by booing from the audience. Deciding that the Sisters had had enough of chasing and argument, the Durian Sisters issued a challenge to see which duo was the better performer. The challenge would be held on the 30th night at Li Xing stage, with the losing duo permanently retiring from Getai. After the Durian Sisters left the stage, Small Papaya fainted and was admitted to the hospital, and the newspaper reported on the Sisters' feud on the front page.

Aunt Ling, Big Papaya and Guan Yin visited Small Papaya in the hospital. Guan Yin decided to sell his pet chicken to raise funds to pay off medical bills. After Small Papaya was discharged, the Papaya Sisters rehearsed tirelessly for the competition while the Durian Sisters campaigned for public support. Meanwhile Karen spied on the Durian Sisters' set list. The Papaya Sisters visited the Goddess of Getai again for blessings. The Goddess blessed them, and noted the limitation of her power, and how their actions and karma would affect their overall performance. Aunt Ling then talked to the Goddess and it was revealed they were in love with the same man Ah Long, Guan Yin's father, 20 years ago.

On the 30th night, Lin Li hosted the Li Xing stage and the duel, with the results solely decided by the audience. After the Durian Sisters opened with their first performance, Lin noticed the Papaya Sisters were nowhere to be seen. Lim is about to disqualify the Papaya Sisters, but they arrived in the nick of time and began their first performance.

In the second performance, the Durian Sisters revealed that they had kidnapped Karen, forcing her to support their performance. Midway through, while the Durian Sisters attack the Papaya Sisters with lasers shot from their bras, the Papaya Sisters and their entourage fought back with their respective weapons, before performing their second song.

After the third song by the Papaya Sisters, the audience gave an ovation to them. The Durian Sisters appeared to concede defeat before shooting a spirit arrow at the Papaya Sisters. The Papaya Sisters were severely wounded and lay on the ground. As they sing of their relationship, everyone including the Durian Sisters is touched by their sisterly love. Small Papaya was warded in the hospital one last time.

Distraught, Big Papaya begged the Goddess of Getai to save Small Papaya but to no avail. The Sisters embraced each other and sang together for the last time before Small Papaya dies.

Guan Yin narrated that his mother Aunt Ling never laughed since Small Papaya died. Three years later, Big Papaya is still singing getai, now alone but with her mother and the spirit of Small Papaya supporting amongst the audience. Guan Yin ended his narration by mentioning that he looks forward to every seventh month, as that is the only time all three of them can be reunited.

During the credits, Guan Yin looked through the photos that he took, finding a feather. It rose on his breath to the sky where Small Papaya, sitting on a crescent moon, caught it.

== Cast ==
- Mindee Ong as Little Papaya
- Yeo Yann-Yann as Big Papaya
- Liu Lingling as Goddess of 'Getai' (Xiangu) / Aunt Ling
- Qi Yuwu as Guan Yin
- Kelvin Tan as Chen Weilian
- Wang Lei as himself
- Teh May-Wan and Teh Choy-Wan as Durian Sisters

== Production ==
The film's story was originally conceived as a joke after Royston and the two lead actresses agreed that Getai was one of Singapore's uniquely Singaporean cultural attributes.

It took Royston Tan 22 days to produce the film and only two weeks to write it, which, according to him, was the easiest and fastest script he has written. The large variety of costumes used in the production cost upwards of S$100,000.

== Critical reception ==
Even before its official release, 881 garnered good reviews from critics.

== Soundtrack ==
The official soundtrack was released the evening before the show opened, on 8 August. Produced by Eric Ng of Funkie Monkies Productions, the soundtrack consists of 15 songs (1 hidden) and 4 music videos. The theme song, One Half, is sung by Wu Jiahui. A second volume of the original soundtrack has since been released with 18 songs.

== Egg pelting incident ==
While promoting the film from a truck on Orchard Road, the cast was pelted with eggs by an unidentified assailant riding pillion. Lead actress Mindee Ong later suffered from an eye infection from the attack. No charges were pressed.
