= Infinite Frameworks =

Infinite Frameworks is an animation studio located in Singapore, with a sister studio called P.T. Kinema located in Indonesia. It is owned by a consortium, 90% of which is held by Indonesian businessman and film producer Mike Wiluan.

== Productions and collaborations ==
- 881 (2007)
- My Magic (2008)
- 12 Lotus (2008)
- Sing to the Dawn (2008)
- Contraptus (2009–2010)
- The Garfield Show (2010–2012)
- Franklin and Friends (2011–2013)
- Tatsumi (2011)
- Chicken Town (2011)
- Dead Mine (2012)
- Equals (2015)
- Headshot (2016)
- Beyond Skyline (2017)
- Buffalo Boys (2018)
- Precious Is the Night (2020)
- Jagat Arwah (2022)
- God's Gang (2023–present)
