= Mee Pok Man =

- Film poster
- Directed by: Eric Khoo
- Written by: Damien Sin (as Yu Lei Foong)
- Produced by: Jacqueline Khoo
- Starring: Joe Ng; Michelle Goh; Lim Kay Tong; David Brazil
- Cinematography: Yoke Weng Ho
- Edited by: Martyn See
- Music by: John David Kompa
- Distributed by: Zhao Wei Films
- Release date: 1995
- Running time: 98 minutes
- Country: Singapore
- Languages: Cantonese; Mandarin; Hokkien; English
- Budget: $70,000 - $100,000
- Box office: $450,000

Mee Pok Man is a 1995 Singaporean film directed by Eric Khoo.

== Synopsis ==
Johnny runs an all-night mee pok (Chinese noodle) stall which is frequented by prostitutes and criminals. He falls in love with Bunny, a beautiful young prostitute, who frequent his store and fantasize saving Bunny from her life. Bunny is mistreated by her pimp and dates an Englishman, hoping to escape her life through him.

Bunny is beaten and thrown out of a car and was taken by Johnny to his room to treat her. They develop a relationship but Bunny dies suddenly after a few days. Shocked by her death, Johnny keeps her body in his apartment for days.

Bunny’s young brother found and read her diary, disclosing her bright and naive aspirations and discovering her frustrations and disillusions.

== Cast ==
- Joe Ng as Johnny
- Michelle Goh as Bunny
- Lim Kay Tong as Mike Kor
- David Brazil as Jonathan Reese
- George Chua

== Production ==
The film is Eric Khoo's debut feature, released under his film production company, Zhao Wei Films, after making award-winning short films for years.

The film's story was inspired by a story by Damien Sin, "One Last Cold Kiss", that appeared in Classic Singapore Horror Stories: Book 2 (1994). Khoo was supposed to illustrate the story about a mortuary attendant who falls in love with a fresh corpse, brings it back home, and has a relationship with it. The film was produced under a meager $70,000 budget and a shooting schedule of 16 days. With little room for error, cinematographer Ho Yoke Weng recalled limiting himself to just three takes per scene. It was later reported the budget was $100,000.

== Release ==
The film was given an "R(A)" rating in Singapore, restricting the movie audience to adults aged 21 and above, but after the change in film ratings in 2004, it was re-rated "M18" (aged 18 and above).

== Soundtrack ==
The soundtrack album was released under BMG and featured the film score by Kevin Mathews and music by Singaporean acts including The Padres (a band fronted by Joe Ng, the film's male lead actor), Opposition Party, Livonia, Etc and Sugarflies.

== Critical reception ==
The film was entered into the 19th Moscow International Film Festival and showed at more than 30 film festivals worldwide, winning the FIPRESCI (The International Federation of Film Critics) Award.

== Legacy ==
In November 2015, the film was restored by the Asian Film Archive and presented at the 26th Singapore International Film Festival. The restored film also enjoyed a run at independent cinema The Projector, which also celebrated its legacy with talks.

In 2019, the film was presented at the inaugural New York Asian Film Festival winter showcase.
