= 15 (film) =

2003 Singaporean film directed by Royston Tan

- Theatrical poster
- Directed by: Royston Tan
- Written by: Royston Tan
- Produced by: Tan Fong Cheng; Eric Khoo
- Starring: Shaun Tan; Melvin Chen; Erick Chun; Vynn Soh; Melvin Lee
- Cinematography: Lim Ching Leong
- Edited by: Jeff Stevens; Nigel Fernandez
- Music by: Yellowbox
- Distributed by: Zhao Wei Films
- Release date: 27 April 2003
- Running time: 96 minutes
- Country: Singapore
- Languages: Hokkien; Mandarin

15 is a 2003 Singaporean coming-of-age black comedy-drama film about teenage gangsters in the Singapore suburbs. Directed by Royston Tan, the film is an expanded version of Tan's 2002 award-winning short film, also titled 15. It is one of the few Singaporean films to feature brief full-frontal male nudity, together with the Singaporean-Thai film Pleasure Factory and the Singaporean-Hong Kong film Bugis Street.

== Plot ==
The film stars three real-life juvenile gangsters, all aged 15, giving an accurate depiction of Chinese teenage gang-life in the Singapore suburbs. The 2003 film features two more gangsters as characters as well as a fight sequence with more affluent English-educated Singapore youths. Rather than scripting the movie or employing professional actors, Tan attempted to capture the troubled lives of his characters in realistic fashion, apparently without much prior scripting.

== Production ==
The Singapore Film Commission funded 25% of 15's S$200,000 production costs.

== Release ==
In Singapore, the film premiered during the 2003 Singapore International Film Festival. In 2003, it premiered in Canada during the Montreal World Film Festival, and in Britain during the London Film Festival. In 2004, it premiered in the United States during the Sundance Film Festival, and in Australia during the Sydney Film Festival. The film also saw its first US theatrical release in New York City on 13 April 2005.

In Singapore, the film is distributed by Zhao Wei Films. In North America, it is distributed by Picture This! Entertainment.

== Reception ==
=== Censorship ===
While the Media Development Authority (MDA) ruled that the film should be passed uncut under the then R(A) rating, the Singapore Police Force was concerned that fights could break out given the use of real gang names, locations and secret society chants in the movie, requesting cuts/edits to be made through the MDA for law and order reasons. Under pressure, Tan alleged MDA required 27 cuts to the film which it denied, citing it requested nine cuts but Tan had chosen to cut in a way that it required 27 cuts. Opposition was also raised against the heavy use of Hokkien in the film, which is discouraged by the Singapore government in favour of Mandarin and English. These restrictions infuriated Tan, and later led him to create his satirical short film Cut.

=== Critical response ===
On Rotten Tomatoes it has an approval rating of 50% based on 10 reviews. On Metacritic the film has a score of 47% based on six reviews, indicating "mixed or average" reviews.

The film has been advertised outside of Singapore in gay publications, due to the heavy homoerotic tension between the characters. However, in an interview segment of the DVD Royston's Shorts, a collection of Tan's short films, Tan affirms that the boys whose lives he portrayed do not identify as gay.

=== Awards ===
- FIPRESCI/NETPAC Award, Singapore International Film Festival (2003)
- Best Fiction, Tampere International Short Film Festival (2003)
- Prize of the Youth Film Competition (Special Mention), Oberhausen International Short Film Festival (2003)
- Grand Prix Asturias (nominated), Gijón International Film Festival (2003)
- Best Director, Buenos Aires International Festival of Independent Cinema (2004)

== See also ==
- List of Singaporean films
- Nudity in film (East Asian cinema since 1929)
