= Josh Lai =

Australian rules footballer (born 2005)

Personal information
- Born: 1 October 2005 (age 21); Singapore
- Original team: Cheltenham
- Draft: Pre-season supplementary signing, 2024 national draft
- Height: 185 cm (6 ft 1 in)
- Position: Defender

Club information
- Current club: Port Adelaide
- Number: 43

Playing career
Years	Club	Games (Goals)
2026–	Port Adelaide	19 (0)

Josh Lai (born 1 October 2005) is an Australian rules footballer who plays for Port Adelaide in the Australian Football League (AFL).

Lai was born in Singapore and is one of identical twin brothers. His father Tim is Singaporean, partially raised in Sydney, and his mother Donna is Australian. Although residents of China at the time, Lai's parents opted to have their sons born in Singapore, preferring their healthcare system. Afterwards the family returned to China, where Lai attended an international school. He played soccer during his time in China.

After moving to Melbourne as a six-year-old, Lai was educated at Mentone Grammar School and played junior Australian rules football with Hampton Rovers, East Sandringham and Cheltenham, primarily as a winger. He had to sit out of football for his final year of school after fracturing his foot and instead played schoolboy volleyball, causing him to be overlooked for the talent pathways. Instead, Lai was recruited on the back of a best-on-ground performance for Cheltenham in the 2024 Southern Football League grand final, which had been attended by members of Port Adelaide's recruitment team.

Lai trained with Port Adelaide in the 2025 pre-season and was signed by the club as a rookie during the supplemental selection period. After playing 15 SANFL games in 2025, Lai made his AFL debut in round three of the 2026 season against the West Coast Eagles at Adelaide Oval, and remained a regular in their backline for the remainder of the year, amassing 19 appearances. He won the club's "Coaches' Award" for his performances in 2026.
