= Alien Lockdown =

2004 television film directed by Tim Cox

- Screenplay by: Ross Helford; T.M. Van Ostrand
- Story by: John Thompson; Boaz Davidson; Kenneth M. Badish
- Directed by: Tim Cox
- Starring: John Savage; James Marshall; Michelle Goh
- Composer: John Dickson
- Country of origin: United States
- Original language: English

Production
- Executive producers: Avi Lerner; Danny Dimbort; Trevor Short
- Producers: Boaz Davidson; Kenneth M. Badish
- Production locations: Sofia, Bulgaria
- Cinematography: John Bartley
- Editor: Marc Jakubowicz
- Running time: 90 minutes
- Production companies: Nu Image; Active Entertainment

Original release
- Network: Sci Fi Channel
- Release: February 7, 2004

Alien Lockdown, also known as Creature and Predatorman, is a 2004 American science fiction horror television film directed by Tim Cox. The screenplay by Ross Helford and T.M. Van Ostrand is from a story by John Thompson, Boaz Davidson, and Kenneth M. Badish. The film stars John Savage, James Marshall, and Michelle Goh.

== Plot ==
An ancient alien life force, after lying dormant for centuries, awakens with a hunger for humans. It is up to an elite SWAT team led by a fierce assassin to save mankind from a fate worse than death. For centuries, the extraterrestrial waited for human knowledge to evolve enough to unlock the source of its deadly potential.

When a mad scientist finally breaks the genetic code, a horde of mutant creatures begins to spawn, each a killing machine. Deep within a top-secret military base, a small army of soldiers attempts to exterminate the bloodthirsty beast, but with each life it takes, the creature grows more powerful. Is it possible that mankind's place on the food chain has finally been challenged?

== Cast ==
- John Savage as Dr. Alan Woodman
- James Marshall as Charlie Dryfus
- Michelle Goh as Commander Rita Talon
- T.M. Van Ostrand as Lieutenant Raymond Green
- Nathan Perez as Sal Meyer
- David Kallaway as Kerns
- Martin Kove as Colonel Anslow
- Atanas Srebrev as Temple
- Stanimir Stamatov as Hoog
- Raicho Vasilev as Monie
- Stanislav Dimitrov as Creature
