= Royston Tan =

Singaporean filmmaker (born 1976)

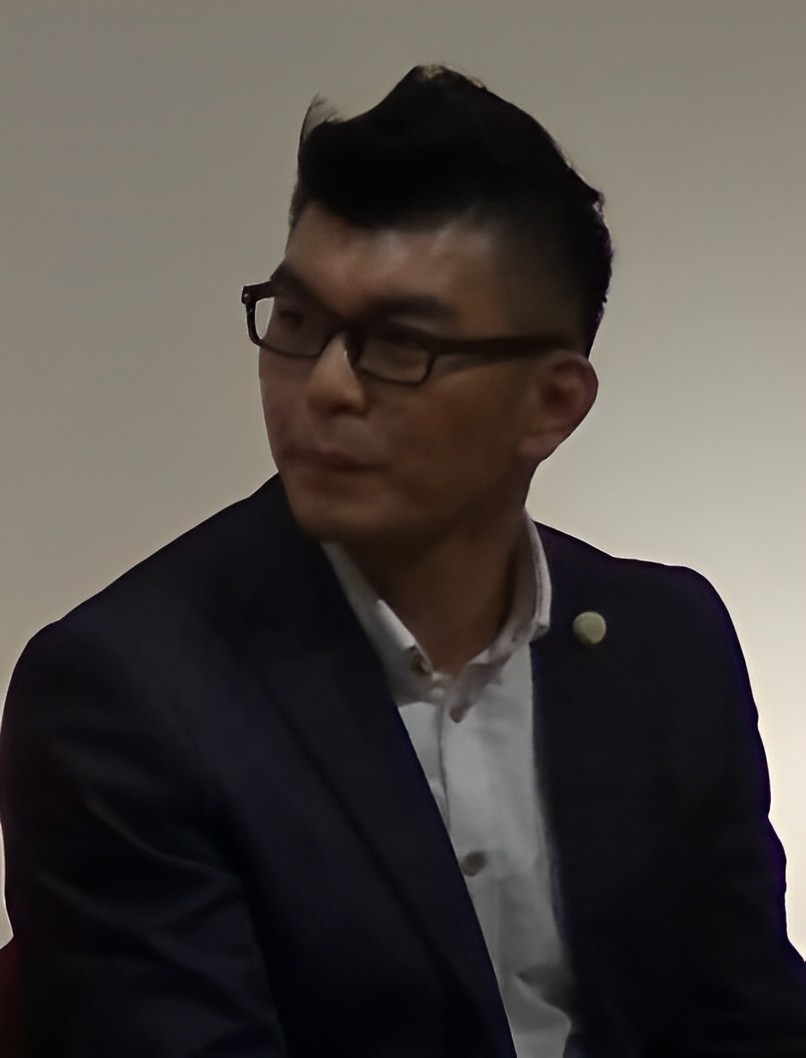
- Tan at a screening of 7 Letters in London on 17 June 2016
- Born: 5 October 1976 (age 50); Singapore
- Other name: Chen Ziqian
- Education: Zhonghua Secondary School
- Alma mater: Temasek Polytechnic
- Occupations: Director; screenwriter; producer; actor
- Years active: 1995–present
- Parents: Tan Chin Cheng (father); Ng Peng Hwy (mother)

Chinese name
- Traditional Chinese: 陳子謙
- Simplified Chinese: 陈子谦
- Hanyu Pinyin: Chén Zǐqiān
- Hokkien POJ: Tân Chí-khiam
- Website: royston-tan.blogspot.com

Royston Tan (born 5 October 1976) is a Singaporean filmmaker and actor.

== Background ==
Tan is a graduate from Temasek Polytechnic, where he studied Visual Communications. He first came into prominence through his short films: Sons (2000), Hock Hiap Leong (2001), 48 on AIDS (2002), Mother (2002) and 15 (2002). He has so far directed six features.

In 2021 he was selected as a jury member for the Sonje Award at the 26th Busan International Film Festival.

He was appointed creative director of the Singapore National Day Parade in 2020 and 2023. In 2023, Tan was one of the eight assentors appointed for eventual president-elect Tharman Shanmugaratnam in the 2023 Singaporean presidential election.

== Filmography ==
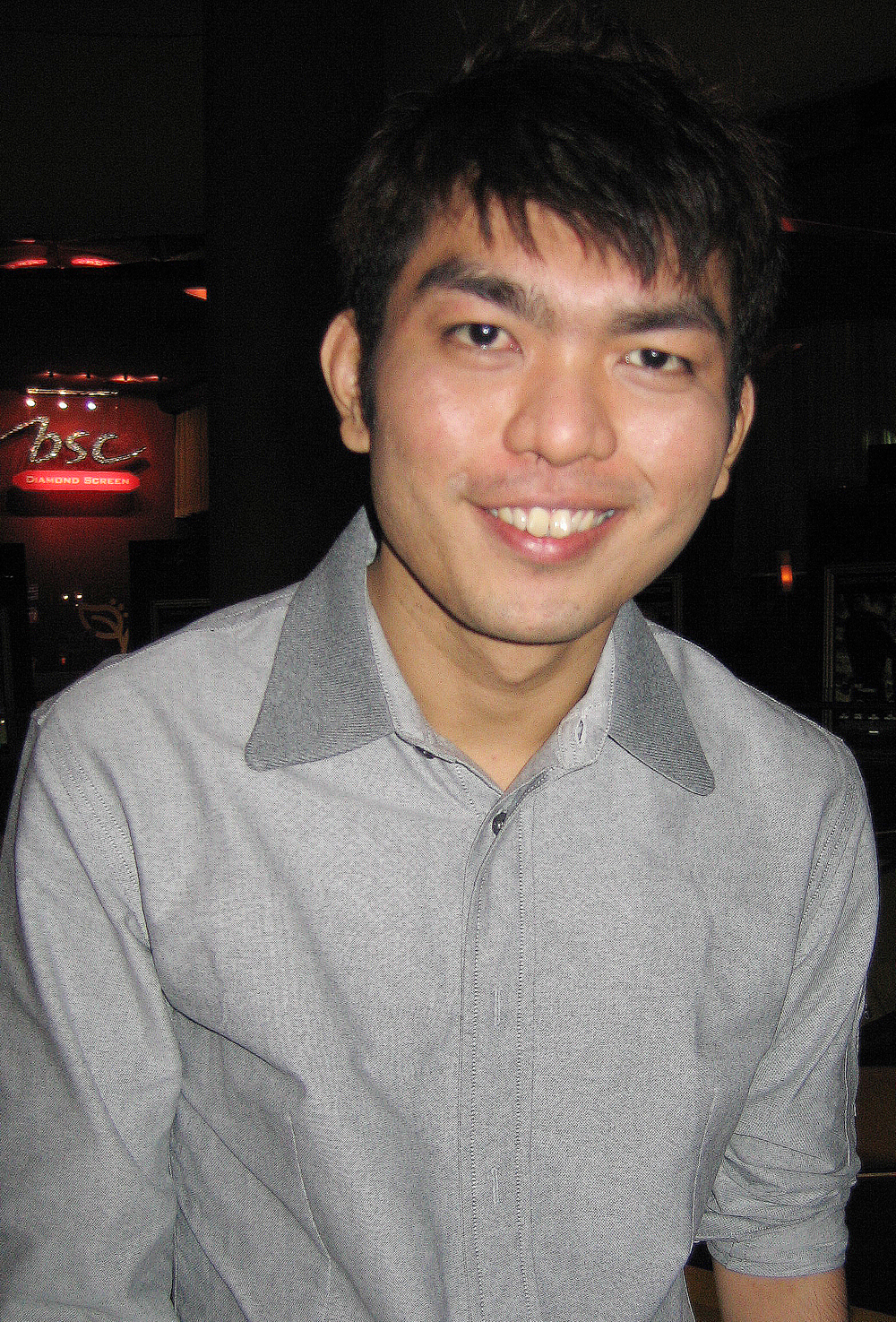
Tan in 2007

=== As director ===
==== Feature films ====
Year	Title	Notes	Ref.
2003	15		
2006	4:30		
2007	881		
2008	12 Lotus		
2015	3688		
2021	24		

==== Short films ====
- Adam.Eve.Steve (1997)
- Jesses (1999)
- Sons (2000)
- Hock Hiap Leong (2001)
- 48 on AIDS (2002)
- 24 HRS (2002)
- Mother (2002)
- 15 (short) (2002)!
- The Old Man and The River (2003)
- 177155 (2003)
- Cut (2004)
- The Blind Trilogy: Blind / Old Parliament House / Capitol Cinema (2004)
- The Absentee (2004)
- Careless Whisperer (2005)
- New York Girl (2005)
- Monkeylove (2005)
- DIY (2005)
- Cellouiod Dreams (2006), for the National Museum of Singapore's Living Galleries
- Sin Sai Hong (2006)
- After The Rain (2007)
- My SARS Lover (2008)
- Little Note (2009)
- Anniversary (2009)
- No Admittance (2010)
- Ah Kong (2010)
- FishLove (2010)
- I want to remember (2011)
- Vicky (2014)
- 033713 (2014)
- Wedding portrait (2014)
- 50 First Kisses (2015)
- Bunga Sayang (2015), as part of the anthology 7 Letters
- Provision Shop (2016)
- Half (2022)

==== Other works ====
- Remains (1995) Music video
- Erase (1996) Music video
- Kisses (1997) Music video
- 4A Florence Close (1998) Home video
- Birdsong (2010) TV movie
- Old Places (2010) TV movie
- Singapore Biennale 2013 If The World Changed - Ghost of Capitol Theatre
- Journey to the West Pioneer Generation Video (2015) Advertorial
- Voyage (2017) Multimedia musical
- GeTai Challenge (2018) Guest judge (episode 15-16)
- High (2020) Interactive film
- National day Parade (2020)
- National day Parade (2023)

=== As actor ===
Year	Title	Role	Notes	Ref.
1998	The Teenage Textbook Movie			
1999	Pong			
2005	Be with Me			

=== Compilations ===
- Royston's Shorts (2006) - produced by Tan Bee Thiam

== Awards ==
1996

- National Panasonic Video Award for Music Video for "Erase"

1997

- UTV International Book Prize for "Adam.Eve.Steve"

1998

- Bios MTV Awards 2nd prize for Music Video for "Kisses"

1999/2000

- Hong Kong IDN Excellence in Digital Imaging Award for "Senses"

2000

- 13th Singapore International Film Festival

Best Short Film for "Sons"
Special Achievement Award for "Sons"

2001

- Singapore Short Film Festival – The Voice Award for "Mother"
- 6th Malaysian Video Awards: ASEAN Director of the Year – Silver Award
- 23rd JVC Video Award – Silver Award for "Sons"

2002

- The National Arts Council – Young Artist Award 2002
- 21st Uppsala International Short Film Festival (Sweden) – International Jury Honorary Mention for "Hock Hiap Leong"
- 6th Thai Short Film and Video Festival – Best International Short Film Award for "15"
- Asian Television Awards 2002 – Technical and Creative Winner

Best of Show
Best Cinematography Award

- Promax Asia 2002 – Silver for "48 on AIDS"
- 15th Singapore International Film Festival – Special Achievement Award for Short Film "15"
- "Fest Forward" – Audience Choice for "15"
- Tampere International Film Festival – Jury's Diploma of Merit Award for "Hock Hiap Leong"

2003

- Filmlet 2003 – Best International Short Film
- Brief Encounter Short Film Festival 2003
- Best International Short Film
- Kurzfilmtage Winterthur 2003 – Promotion Prize of the International Competition 03
- 22nd Uppsala International Short Film Festival (Sweden) "UppsalaFilmkaja" Award
- Mecal Film Festival – Special Mention for "15" (short film)
- 16th Singapore International Film Festival – NETPAC-FIPRESCI Jury World Critic Award for "15: The Movie"
- Newport International Film Festival – Honorable Mention for "15"
- Oberhausen Short Film Festival – Special Mention Award for "15"
- Tampere Film Festival – Best Fiction Award for "15"
- Hong Kong Independent Short Film & Video Awards – Asian New Force 2003 Critics Awards for Short Film for "15"
- New York Film and Television Award – Silver for "48 on AIDS"

2004

- Hall of Fame – Best Family TVC (Starhub)
- 10th Lyon Asian Film Festival – Press Award for 2nd Best Film for "15"
- TIME Magazine – "Top 20 Asian Heroes"
- Panasonic Digital Filmmaker Awards 2004 First Prize for "Cut"
- 2004 Busan Asian Short Film Festival Excellent Kodak Film Award for "15" (short film)
- Buenos Aires VI Festival Internacional de Cine Independiente

Signis Special Mention Award for "15: The Movie"
Best Director Award for "15: The Movie"

- Deauville Asian Film Festival – Special Jury Award for "15: The Movie"

2005

- 3rd Vladivostok Pacific Meridian Film Festival – Best Short Film for "Cut"
- Clermont-Ferrand Short Film Festival – Canal+ Award 2005 for "Cut"

2006

- 2006 Hawaii International Film Festival NETPAC award – (4:30)
- 2006 Sapporo Short Shorts Special award – (Monkeylove)
- 2006 HAF Award – "132"
- 2006 Fitzroy Short Film Festival – Audience Prize for "Monkeylove"
- Geneva Black Movie Festival – Special Mention Award for "4:30"

2007

- Main Prize of the 5th Festival Signes de Nuit for "Monkeylove"
- Winner of the Silver Screen Gangster Award
- 29th Clermont-Ferrand Film Festival Grand prix for "Monkeylove"

2009

- 22nd Singapore International Film Festival – Singapore Film Awards: Best Director for "12 Lotus"

2010

- 1st Singapore Short Film Awards – Honorary Award for "outstanding contribution to the film community through short films"
- Singapore Youth Award - Arts & Culture

2012

- Busan International Film Festival BIFF Award for '69'

2013

- China International Micro Film Awards "Best Director" for 'Popiah'
- Hangzhou International Micro-film festival 2013 "Special Jury Award" for 'Popiah'
- The 4th Xi’an China International Folk Video Festival 2013 for 'Popiah'

2015

- Golden Horse Award Audience Choice Awards Runner-up for '3688'

2016

- Sapporo International Short Film Festival 'Best Asian Short' for Bunga Sayang
- Kumamoto City Award Focus on Asia-Fukuoka International Film Festival for '7 Letters'

2017

- 同仁 Special Jury Award for 'Popiah'
- 歌台至尊大奖 for 881, 歌台红星大奖

2020

- Asian Academy Creative Award 'Best Immersive Award' for 'High'

2022

- Jogja-Netpac Asian Film Festival "Jury Special Mention" for '24'
