= List of Singapore International Film Festival awards =

The Singapore International Film Festival (SGIFF) is an annual film festival held every year in Singapore. Founded in 1987, the festival is one of the most significant film festivals in Asia. Besides the competition feature and short film screenings, film industry-related activities such as exhibitions, workshops and seminars are also part of the official SGIFF programme.

The Silver Screen Awards Competition was introduced in 1991 to encourage advances in Asian film-making standards. Every year, a selection of Asian feature and short films take part in the competition. In 2014, the Southeast Asian Short Film category was introduced, replacing the Singapore Short Film category. The first Southeast Asian Film Lab was introduced in 2015.

== List of winners ==
=== 1991 Silver Screen Awards ===
Category	Award	Name	Title	Country
Feature	Best Asia Feature	Park Kwang-su	Black Republic	South Korea
Feature	Special Jury	Huang Mingchuan	The Man from Island West	Taiwan
Singapore Short Film	Best Film	Eric Khoo	August	Singapore
Singapore Short Film	Special Jury	K. Subramanyam	The Cage	Singapore

=== 1992 Silver Screen Awards ===
Category	Award	Name	Title	Country
Feature	Best Asia Feature	Chen Kaige	Life on a String	China
Feature	Special Jury	M. T. Vasudevan Nair	The Ferry (Kadavu)	India
Feature	Best Director	Edward Yang	A Brighter Summer Day	Taiwan
Singapore Short Film	Special Jury	Meng Ong	Waves of a Distant Shore	Singapore
Singapore Short Film	Best Director	Meng Ong	Waves of a Distant Shore	Singapore

=== 1993 Silver Screen Awards ===
Category	Award	Name	Title	Country
Feature	Best Asia Feature	Stan Lai	The Peach Blossom Land	Taiwan
Feature	Special Jury	Wang Tung	Hill of No Return	Taiwan
Feature	Best Director	Stan Lai	The Peach Blossom Land	Taiwan
Feature	Best Actress	Yang Kwei-mei	Hill of No Return	
Feature	NETPAC-FIPRESCI	Stan Lai	The Peach Blossom Land	Taiwan
Singapore Short Film	Special Jury	Nisar and Nazir Husain	Ragged	Singapore
Singapore Short Film	Best Director	Meng Ong	Buddha's Garden	Singapore

=== 1994 Silver Screen Awards ===
Category	Award	Name	Title	Country
Feature	Best Asia Feature	Im Kwon-taek	Sopyonje	South Korea
Feature	Special Jury	Tsai Ming-Liang	Rebels of the Neon God	Taiwan
Feature	Special Jury	Zhang Yuan	Beijing Bastards	China
Feature	Special Jury mention	Adoor Gopalakrishnan	The Servile	India
Feature	Best Director	Tian Zhuangzhuang	The Blue Kite	China
Feature	Best Actor	Amrish Puri	Seventh Horse of the Sun	India
Feature	Best Actress	Lü Liping	The Blue Kite	
Feature	NETPAC-FIPRESCI	Adoor Gopalakrishnan	The Servile	India
Singapore Short Film	Best Film	Dominic Christopher Pereira	Ethos	Singapore
Singapore Short Film	Best Film	Chee Kong Cheah (CheeK)	Married	Singapore
Singapore Short Film	Best Director	Eric Khoo	Pain	Singapore
Singapore Short Film	Special Achievement	Eric Khoo	Pain	Singapore
Singapore Short Film	Special Jury	Hurt Instinct	Nisar and Nazir Husain	Singapore
Singapore Short Film	Special Jury	Eddy	Dzulkilfi Sungit, Remi Mohamed	Singapore

=== 1995 Silver Screen Awards ===
Category	Award	Name	Title	Country
Feature	Best Asia Feature	Tsai Ming-Liang	Vive l'Amour	Taiwan
Feature	Special Jury	He Jianjun	Postman	China
Feature	Best Actor	Xia Yu	In the Heat of the Sun	
Feature	Best Actress	Yang Kwei-Mei	Vive l'Amour	
Feature	NETPAC-FIPRESCI	Wu Nien-jen	A Borrowed Life	Taiwan
Feature	NETPAC-FIPRESCI Special Mention	Eric Khoo	Mee Pok Man	Singapore
Singapore Short Film	Special Jury	K. Rajagopal	I Can't Sleep Tonight	Singapore

=== 1996 Silver Screen Awards ===
Category	Award	Name	Title	Country
Feature	Best Asia Feature	Darezhan Omirbayev	Cardiogram	Kazakhstan
Feature	Special Jury	Ning Ying	On the Beat	China
Feature	Best Director	Edward Yang	Mahjong	Taiwan
Feature	Best Actor	Bishnu Kharghoria	It's a Long Way to the Sea (Xagoroloi Bohudoor)	India
Feature	NETPAC-FIPRESCI Special Mention	Bishnu Kharghoria	It's a Long Way to the Sea (Xagoroloi Bohudoor)	India
Feature	Special Achievement	Hou Hsiao-hsien	Good Men, Good Women	Taiwan
Feature	NETPAC-FIPRESCI	Hou Hsiao-hsien	Good Men, Good Women	Taiwan
Singapore Short Film	Best Film	Sandi Tan, Jasmine Ng, Kelvin Tong	A Moveable Feast	Singapore
Singapore Short Film	Best Director	Lim Suat Yen	Sense of Home	Singapore
Singapore Short Film	Special Jury	K. Rajagopal	The Glare	Singapore
Singapore Short Film	Special Achievement	Lim Suat Yen	Sense of Home	Singapore

=== 1997 Silver Screen Awards ===
Category	Award	Name	Title	Country
Feature	Best Asia Feature	Mohsen Makhmalbaf	Gabbeh	Iran
Feature	Special Jury	Tsai Ming-liang	The River	Taiwan
Feature	Best Director	Wu Tianming	The King of Masks	
Feature	Best Actor	Miao Tien	The River	Taiwan
Feature	Best Actress	Machiko Ono	Suzaku	Japan
Feature	NETPAC-FIPRESCI	Eric Khoo	12 Storeys	Singapore
Singapore Short Film	Best Film	Chee Kong Cheah (CheeK)	Beansprouts and Salted Fish	Singapore
Singapore Short Film	Special Achievement	Chee Kong Cheah (CheeK)	Beansprouts and Salted Fish	Singapore
Singapore Short Film	Best Director	Wee Li Lin	Norman on the Air	Singapore
Singapore Short Film	Special Jury	K. Rajagopal	Absence	Singapore

=== 1998 Silver Screen Awards ===
Category	Award	Name	Title	Country
Feature	Best Asia Feature	Majid Majidi	Children of the Heaven	Iran
Feature	Special Jury	Jafar Panahi	Ayneh (The Mirror)	Iran
Feature	Best Director	Jafar Panahi	Ayneh (The Mirror)	Iran
Feature	UOB Young Cinema	Ho Ping	Wolves Cry Under the Moon	Taiwan
Feature	Best Actor	Sunny Chan Kam Hung	Hold You Tight	
Feature	Best Actress	Nita Fernando	Walls Within (Pawuru Walalu)	Sri Lanka
Feature	NETPAC-FIPRESCI	Marilou Diaz-Abaya	In the Navel of the Sea	Philippines
Feature	NETPAC-FIPRESCI Special Mention	Stanley Kwan	Hold You Tight	Hong Kong
Singapore Short Film	Best Film	Ong Lay Jinn	By the Dawn's Early Rise	Singapore
Singapore Short Film	Best Director	Jack Neo	Replacement Killers	Singapore

=== 1999 Silver Screen Awards ===
Category	Award	Name	Title	Country
Feature	Best Asia Feature	Tsai Ming-Liang	The Hole	Taiwan
Feature	Best Director	Tsai Ming-Liang	The Hole	Taiwan
Feature	Special Jury	Wan Jen	Connection by Fate	Taiwan
Feature	NETPAC-FIPRESCI	Wan Jen	Connection by Fate	Taiwan
Feature	Special Mention	Aktan Abdykalykov	The Adopted Son (Beshkempir)	Kyrgyzstan/France
Feature	SFC Young Cinema	Aktan Abdykalykov	The Adopted Son (Beshkempir)	Kyrgyzstan/France
Feature	Best Screenplay	Minoru Iizuka	Ikinai	Japan
Feature	Best Actor	Joe Abeywickrama	Pura Handa Kaluwara	
Feature	Best Actress	Yang Kwei-Mei	The Hole	
Feature	NETPAC-FIPRESCI Special Mention	Hong Sang-soo	The Power of Kangwon Province	South Korea
Feature	NETPAC-FIPRESCI Special Mention	Aktan Abdykalykov	The Adopted Son (Beshkempir)	Kyrgyzstan/France
Singapore Short Film	Best Film	Abdul Nizam	Datura	Singapore
Singapore Short Film	Best Director	Tay Hui Ngi	Pariah's Diary	Singapore
Singapore Short Film	Special Jury	Shermeen Ng	TMIUS	Singapore
Singapore Short Film	Special Achievement	Wee Li Lin	Another Guy	Singapore
Singapore Short Film	Special Mention	Edwin Yeo	Doh laai tin sai	Singapore
Singapore Short Film	Special Mention	Victric Thng Hui Leong	Please Use Stairs	Singapore

=== 2000 Silver Screen Awards ===
Category	Award	Name	Title	Country
Feature	Best Asia Feature	Chang Tso-chi	Darkness And Light	Taiwan
Feature	NETPAC-FIPRESCI	Chang Tso-chi	Darkness And Light	Taiwan
Feature	Special Jury	Dev Benegal	Split Wide Open	India
Feature	Best Director	Zhang Yuan	Seventeen Years	China
Feature	SFC Young Cinema	Jasmine Ng, Kelvin Tong	Eating Air	Singapore
Feature	Best Actor	Rahul Bose	Split Wide Open	
Feature	Best Actress	Liu Lin, Li Bingbing	Seventeen Years	
Feature	Best Screenplay	Aos Gitai, Eliette Abecassis	Kadosh (Sacred)	Israel
Feature	NETPAC-FIPRESCI	Wang Xiaoshuai	So Close to Paradise	China
Singapore Short Film	Best Film	Royston Tan	Sons	Singapore
Singapore Short Film	Special Achievement	Royston Tan	Sons	Singapore
Singapore Short Film	Special Jury	Kwong Chee Guan Boi	Wait	Singapore

=== 2001 Silver Screen Awards ===
Category	Award	Name	Title	Country
Feature	Best Asia Feature	Shinji Aoyama	Eureka	Japan
Feature	Special Jury	Nuri Bilge Ceylan	Clouds of May	Turkey
Feature	SFC Young Cinema	Jia Zhangke	Platform	China
Feature	SFC Young Cinema	Asoka Handagama	This is My Moon	Sri Lanka
Feature	NETPAC-FIPRESCI Special Mention	Asoka Handagama	This is My Moon	Sri Lanka
Feature	Best Director	Im Kwon-taek	Chunhyang	South Korea
Feature	Best Actor	Ibrahim Kadir	A Poet	Indonesia
Feature	Best Actress	Nguyen Lan Huong	The House of Guavas	Vietnam
Feature	NETPAC-FIPRESCI	Garin Nugroho	A Poet	Indonesia
Singapore Short Film	Best Film	No awards were given.		Singapore
Singapore Short Film	Best Director	No awards were given.		Singapore
Singapore Short Film	Special Achievement	Colin Goh	eAHLONG.COM	Singapore

=== 2002 Silver Screen Award ===
Category	Award	Name	Title	Country
Feature	Best Asia Feature	Lav Diaz	Batang West Side	Philippines
Feature	Special Jury	Zhu Wen	Seafood	China/Hong Kong
Feature	Young Cinema	Riri Riza	Eliana, Eliana	Indonesia
Feature	NETPAC-FIPRESCI	Riri Riza	Eliana, Eliana	Indonesia
Feature	Best Director	Semih Kaplanoglu	Away From Home	Turkey
Feature	Best Actor	Jia Hongsheng	Quitting	
Feature	Best Actress	Dian Sastrowardoyo	Whispering Sands	
Feature	NETPAC-FIPRESCI Special Mention	Mingmongkol Sonakul	I-San Special	Thailand
Singapore Short Film	Best Film	Han Yew Kwang	The Call Home	Singapore
Singapore Short Film	Special Jury	Leonard Yip	Eve of Adha	Singapore
Singapore Short Film	Best Director	Sun Koh Boon Luang	The Secret Heaven	Singapore
Singapore Short Film	Special Achievement	Royston Tan	15	Singapore
Asian Digital Film	Critics Prize	Amir Muhammad	Lost	Malaysia
Asian Digital Film	Audience Prize	Melvinder Kanth, Ismail bin Ishak	In Search of Afghanistan	Singapore

=== 2003 Silver Screen Awards ===
Category	Award	Name	Title	Country
Feature	Best Asia Feature	Chang Tso-chi	The Best of Times	Taiwan
Feature	Special Jury	Asoka Handagama	Flying With One Wing	Sri Lanka
Feature	Special Mention	Jia Zhangke	Unknown Pleasures	China/Japan/France
Feature	Best Director	Djamshed Usmonov	Angel On The Right	Tajikistan
Feature	Best Actor	Wing Fan	The Best of Times	
Feature	Best Actress	Anoma Janadari	Flying With One Wing	
Feature	Young Cinema	Apichatpong Weerasethakul	Blissfully Yours	Thailand
Feature	NETPAC-FIPRESCI	Royston Tan	15 - The Movie	Singapore
Singapore Short Film	Best Film	No awards were given.		Singapore
Singapore Short Film	Special Jury	No awards were given.		Singapore
Singapore Short Film	Best Director	No awards were given.		Singapore
Singapore Short Film	Special Achievement	Wee Li Lin	Autograph Book	Singapore

=== 2004 Silver Screen Awards ===
Category	Award	Name	Title	Country
Feature	Best Asia Feature	Nuri Bilge Ceylan	Uzak	Turkey
Feature	Best Director	Nuri Bilge Ceylan	Uzak	Turkey
Feature	Special Jury	Ryūichi Hiroki	Vibrator	Japan
Feature	Young Cinema	Samira Makhmalbaf	At Five In The Afternoon (Panj é asr)	Iran
Feature	Best Actor	Mehmet Emin Toprak	Uzak	
Feature	Best Actress	Terashima Shinobu	Vibrator	
Feature	NETPAC-FIPRESCI	Prasanna Vithanage	August Sun (Ira Madiyama)	Sri Lanka
Singapore Short Film	Best Film	No award was given.		Singapore
Singapore Short Film	Best Director	Students of CHIJ (Toa Payoh) under Mr Tan Wil-Kie	Conflict and Crisis	Singapore
Singapore Short Film	Special Jury	Gek Li San, Ho Choon Hiong	Innocent	Singapore
Singapore Short Film	Special Achievement	Gek Li San, Ho Choon Hiong	Innocent	Singapore

=== 2005 Silver Screen Awards ===
Category	Award	Name	Title	Country
Feature	Best Asia Feature	Oday Rasheed	Underexposure	Iraq/Germany
Feature	Special Jury	Apichatpong Weerasethakul	Tropical Malady	Thailand/France/Italy
Feature	Best Director	Lee Yoon-ki	This Charming Girl	South Korea
Feature	Young Cinema	Liu Fendou	Green Hat	China
Feature	Best Actor	Liao Fan and Li Congxi	Green Hat	
Feature	Best Actress	Kim Ji-soo	This Charming Girl	
Feature	Best Actress	Ho Phuong Dung	A Time Far Past	
Feature	NETPAC-FIPRESCI	Marziyeh Meshkini	Stray Dogs	Iran
Singapore Short Film	Best Film	Boo Junfeng	A Family Portrait	Singapore
Singapore Short Film	Special Achievement	Boo Junfeng	A Family Portrait	Singapore
Singapore Short Film	Best Director	Gavin Lim	Subtitle	Singapore
Singapore Short Film	Special Jury	Srinivas Bhakta	Elephant: OK	Singapore

=== 2006 Silver Screen Awards ===
Category	Award	Name	Title	Country
Feature	Best Asia Feature	Ryūichi Hiroki	It's Only Talk	Japan
Feature	Special Jury	Riri Riza	Gie	Indonesia
Feature	Best Director	Kelvin Tong	Love Story	Singapore
Feature	Best Actor	Elijah Castillo	Pepot Superstar	
Feature	Best Actress	Hanan Tork	Kiss Me Not on the Eyes	Egypt
Feature	NETPAC-FIPRESCI	John Torres	Todo todo teros	Philippines
Feature	NETPAC-FIPRESCI	Ying Liang	Taking Father Home	China
Singapore Short Film	Best Film	Oon Jit Fong	Quietly	Singapore
Singapore Short Film	Best Director	Kam Leong Huat	Di (Little Brother)	Singapore
Singapore Short Film	Special Jury	Kirsten Tan	10 Minutes Later	Singapore
Singapore Short Film	Special Achievement	Kelly Ling	Where Is Singapore?	Singapore

=== 2007 Silver Screen Awards ===
Category	Award	Name	Title	Country
Feature	Best Asia Feature	Garin Nugroho	Opera Jawa	Indonesia
Feature	Special Jury	Ying Liang	The Other Half	China
Feature	Best Director	Shawkat Amin Korki	Crossing the Dust	Iraq
Feature	NETPAC-FIPRESCI	Shawkat Amin Korki	Crossing the Dust	Iraq
Feature	Best Actor	Carlos Chahine	The Last Man	
Feature	Best Actress	Han Hyo-joo	Ad-lib Night	
Feature	NETPAC-FIPRESCI	Lee Hae-young, Lee Hae-jun	Like a Virgin	South Korea
Singapore Short Film	Best Film	Tia Quah	Conversations	Singapore
Singapore Short Film	Best Director	Kirsten Tan	Fonzi	Singapore
Singapore Short Film	Special Jury	Boo Junfeng	Katong Fugue	Singapore
Singapore Short Film	Special Achievement	Tan Wei Keong	White	Singapore

=== 2008 Silver Screen Awards ===
Category	Award	Name	Title	Country
Feature	Best Asia Feature	Brillante Mendoza	Slingshot (Tirador)	Philippines
Feature	Best Director	Brillante Mendoza	Slingshot (Tirador)	Philippines
Feature	NETPAC-FIPRESCI	Brillante Mendoza	Slingshot (Tirador)	Philippines
Feature	Special Jury	Abellatif Abdelhamid	Out of Coverage	Syria
Feature	Best Performance	Inessa Kislova	Swift	
Singapore Short Film	Best Film	Boo Junfeng	Keluar Baris	Singapore
Singapore Short Film	Best Director	Boo Junfeng	Keluar Baris	Singapore
Singapore Short Film	Special Jury	Michael Tay	Wet Seasons	Singapore
Singapore Short Film	Special Achievement	Muhammad Eysham Ali	My Home, My Heaven	Singapore
Singapore Short Film	Best Cinematography	Sharon Loh	Keluar Baris	Singapore
Singapore Short Film	Best Performance	Magdalene Tan	Silent Girls	Singapore

=== 2009 Silver Screen Awards ===
Category	Award	Name	Title	Country
Feature	Best Asia Feature	Rashid Masharawi	Laila’s Birthday	Palestine
Feature	Best Director	Rasoul Sadr Ameli	Every Night, Loneliness	Iran
Feature	Best Performance	Yang Ik-june	Breathless	
Feature	Best Cinematography	Zhang Yi	Jalainur	China
Feature	NETPAC Critics	Zhao Ye	Jalainur	China
Feature	Special Mention	Edwin	Blind Pig Who Wants to Fly	Indonesia
Singapore Feature	Best Film	Kelvin Tong	Rule #1	Singapore
Singapore Feature	Best Director	Royston Tan	12 Lotus	Singapore
Singapore Feature	Best Screenplay	Sherman Ong	Hashi	Singapore
Singapore Feature	Best Performance	Mark Lee	Money No Enough 2	Singapore
Singapore Feature	Best Cinematography	Roszali Samad, Brian Gothong Tan, Sharon Loh, Jaye Neo, Cain Chui, Andrew Mark Sobrielo, Chris Yeo and Adrian Lo	Lucky 7	Singapore
Singapore Short Film	Best Film	Kat Goh	Swimming Lesson	Singapore
Singapore Short Film	Best Director	Kat Goh	Swimming Lesson	Singapore
Singapore Short Film	Best Performance	Cheong Soon Foon	Madam Chan	Singapore
Singapore Short Film	Best Cinematography	Simon Walsh and David Shiyang Liu	5 Films in an Anthology of A Film A Month	Singapore
Singapore Short Film	Special Mention	Tan Wei Keong	Hush Baby	Singapore

=== 2010 Silver Screen Awards ===
Category	Award	Name	Title	Country
Asian Feature	Best Film	Cho Kyeong-Duk	Sex Volunteer	South Korea
Asian Feature	Best Director	Cho Kyeong-Duk	Sex Volunteer	South Korea
Asian Feature	Best Cinematography	Mahsun Kirmizigul	I Saw the Sun (Gunesi Gordum)	Turkey
Asian Feature	Best Performance	Cast	I Saw the Sun (Gunesi Gordum)	Turkey
Asian Feature	NETPAC Critics	Riri Riza	The Dreamer (Sang Pemimpi)	Indonesia
Singapore Short Film	Best Film	Elgin Ho	Promises in December	Singapore
Singapore Short Film	Best Director	Elgin Ho	Promises in December	Singapore
Singapore Short Film	Best Cinematography	Lim Teck Siang	Mu Dan	Singapore
Singapore Short Film	Best Performance	Li Xie	Mu Dan	Singapore
Singapore Short Film	Special Mention	Tanya Lai	Life With Uhmu	Singapore

=== 2011 Silver Screen Awards ===
Category	Award	Name	Title	Country
Asian Feature	Best Film	Yu Li	Buddha Mountain	China
Asian Feature	Special Jury	Heiward Mak	Beside(s,) happiness	Hong Kong
Asian Feature	Best Cinematography	Kim Young-Pil	Rolling Home with a Bull	South Korea
Asian Feature	People's Choice	Sam Voutas	Red Light Revolution	China/Australia
Singapore Short Film	Best Film	James Khoo	Hentak Kaki	Singapore
Singapore Short Film	Best Director	Kenneth Lee	Band of Mischief	Singapore
Singapore Short Film	Best Cinematography	Luo Min	Blue Tide	Singapore
Singapore Short Film	Best Performance	Marc Gabriel Loh	First Breath After Coma	Singapore
Singapore Short Film	Special Mention	Nooraini Shah Sikkander	Window of Dreams	Singapore
Singapore Short Film	Special Achievement	Edmund Chen	Echoing Love (爱情六重奏)	Singapore

=== 2014 Silver Screen Awards ===
Honorary Award		Im Kwon-taek		
Category	Award	Name	Title	Country
Asian Feature	Best Film	Chaitanya Tamhane	Court	India
Asian Feature	Best Director	Chaitanya Tamhane	Court	India
Asian Feature	Special Mention	Park Jung-bum	Alive	South Korea
Asian Feature	Best Performance	Sekar Sari	Siti	Indonesia
Southeast Asian Short Film	Best Southeast Asian Short Film	Kirsten Tan	Dahdi (Granny)	Singapore
Southeast Asian Short Film	Best Singapore Short Film	Shijie Tan	Not Working Today	Singapore
Southeast Asian Short Film	Best Director	Aditya Ahmad	On Stopping the Rain	Indonesia
Southeast Asian Short Film	Special Mention	Chulayarnnon Siriphol	Vanishing Horizon of the Sea	Thailand

=== 2015 Silver Screen Awards ===
Honorary Award		Mohsen Makhmalbaf		
Cinema Legend Award		Michelle Yeoh		
Category	Award	Name	Title	Country
Asian Feature	Best Film	Gurvinder Singh	The Fourth Direction	India
Asian Feature	Special Mention	Avishai Sivan	Tikkun	Israel
Asian Feature	Best Director	Ryusuke Hamaguchi	Happy Hour	Japan
Asian Feature	Best Performance	Taha Tegin Özdemir, Yakup Özgür Kurtaal and Ömer Uluç	Snow Pirates	Turkey
Southeast Asian Short Film	Best Southeast Asian Short Film	Lucky Kuswandi	The Fox Exploits the Tiger's Might	Indonesia
Southeast Asian Short Film	Best Director	Lucky Kuswandi	The Fox Exploits the Tiger's Might	Indonesia
Southeast Asian Short Film	Best Singapore Short Film	Gladys Ng	My Father After Dinner	Singapore
Southeast Asian Short Film	Special Mention	Phuttiphong Aroonpheng	Ferris Wheel	Thailand
Southeast Asian Short Film	Youth Jury Prize	Kavich Neang	Three Wheels	Cambodia/France
Feature	Audience Choice	Olivia Wyatt	Sailing a Sinking Sea	Myanmar/Thailand
Southeast Asian Film Lab	Most Promising Project	He Shuming	A-joom-ma	Singapore

=== 2016 Silver Screen Awards ===
Honorary Award		Fruit Chan		
Cinema Legend Award		Simon Yam		
Category	Award	Name	Title	Country
Asian Feature	Best Film	Deepak Rauniyar	White Sun	Nepal/USA
Asian Feature	Special Mention	Wicaksono Wisnu Legowo	Leftovers	Indonesia
Asian Feature	Best Director	Abdullah Mohammad Saad	Live From Dhaka	Bangladesh
Asian Feature	Best Performance	Mostafa Monwar	Live From Dhaka	Bangladesh
Southeast Asian Short Film	Best Southeast Asian Short Film	Wregas Bhanuteja	In The Year of Monkey	Indonesia
Southeast Asian Short Film	Best Singapore Short Film	Chiang Wei Liang	Anchorage Prohibited	Singapore
Southeast Asian Short Film	Best Director	Liao Jiekai	The Mist	Singapore
Southeast Asian Short Film	Special Mention	Bayu Prihantoro Filemon	On The Origin of Fear	Indonesia
Southeast Asian Short Film	Youth Jury Prize	P.R. Patindol	Still	Philippines
Feature	Audience Choice	Lau Kek-huat	Absent Without Leave	Taiwan/Malaysia
Southeast Asian Film Lab	Most Promising Project	Dong Phuong Thao	Taste	Vietnam/Singapore
Southeast Asian Film Lab	Special Mention	Puangsoi Aksornsawang	Rahula	Thailand

=== 2017 Silver Screen Awards ===
Honorary Award		Garin Nugroho		
Cinema Legend Award		Koji Yakusho		
Inspiring Woman in Film Award		Ana Urushadze		
Category	Award	Name	Title	Country
Asian Feature	Best Film	Ali Asgari	Disappearance	Iran/Qatar
Asian Feature	Best Performance	Sadaf Asgari	Disappearance	Iran/Qatar
Asian Feature	Special Mention	Matan Yair	Scaffolding	Israel/Poland
Asian Feature	Best Director	Anucha Boonyawatana	Malila: The Farewell Flower	Thailand
Southeast Asian Short Film	Best Southeast Asian Short Film	Carlo Francisco Manatad	Employee of the Month (Jodilerks Dela Cruz)	Philippines
Southeast Asian Short Film	Best Singapore Short Film	Tan Wei Keong	Between Us Two	Singapore
Southeast Asian Short Film	Best Director	Sorayos Prapapan	Death of the Sound Man	Thailand
Southeast Asian Short Film	Special Mention	Makbul Mubarak	The Malediction	Indonesia
Youth Jury & Critics	Youth Jury Prize	Sorayos Prapapan	Death of the Sound Man	Thailand
Youth Jury & Critics	Young Critic Award	Joshua Ng Jun Hao, Nanyang Technological University		
Feature	Audience Choice	Luca Guadagnino	Call Me by Your Name	Italy/France
Southeast Asian Film Lab	Most Promising Project	Ratchapoom Boonbunchachoke	A Useful Ghost	Thailand

=== 2018 Silver Screen Awards ===
Honorary Award		Rithy Panh		
Cinema Legend Award		Joan Chen		
Category	Award	Name	Title	Country
Asian Feature	Best Film	Yeo Siew Hua	A Land Imagined	Singapore
Asian Feature	Best Director	Pham Thu Hang	The Future Cries Beneath Our Soil	Philippines/ Vietnam
Asian Feature	Best Performance	Manoranjoan Das	Bulbul Can Sing	India
Asian Feature	Special Mention	Behrouz Nooranipour	Dayan	Iran
Southeast Asian Short Film	Best Southeast Asian Short Film	Danech San	A Million Years	Cambodia
Southeast Asian Short Film	Best Singapore Short Film	Chiang Wei Liang	Luzon	Singapore
Southeast Asian Short Film	Best Director	Aditya Ahmad	A Gift	Indonesia
Southeast Asian Short Film	Special Mention	Korakrit Arunanondchai	With History In A Room Filled With People With Funny Names 4	Thailand
Youth Jury & Critics	Youth Jury Prize	Aditya Ahmad	A Gift	Indonesia
Youth Jury & Critics	Young Critic Award	Ryan Lim, Nanyang Technological University		
Feature	Audience Choice	Shinichiro Ueda	One Cut of the Dead	Japan
Southeast Asian Film Lab	Most Promising Project	Dao Thi Minh Trang	Never Been Kissed	Vietnam

=== 2019 Silver Screen Awards ===
Honorary Award		Takashi Miike		
Cinema Legend Award		Yao Chen		
Category	Award	Name	Title	Country
Asian Feature	Best Film	Shahad Ameen	Scales	Saudi Arabia/United Arab Emirates/Iraq
Asian Feature	Best Director	Oren Gerner	Africa	Israel
Asian Feature	Best Performance	Kristoffer King	Verdict	
Asian Feature	Special Mention	Serhat Karaaslan	Passed by Censor	Turkey/Germany/France
Southeast Asian Short Film	Best Southeast Asian Short Film	Hesome Chemamah	I’m Not Your F***ing Stereotype	Thailand
Southeast Asian Short Film	Best Singapore Short Film	Shoki Lin	Adam	Singapore
Southeast Asian Short Film	Best Director	Zaw Bo Bo Hein	Sick	Myanmar
Southeast Asian Short Film	Special Mention	Sreylin Meas	California Dreaming	Cambodia
Youth Jury & Critics	Youth Jury Prize	Duong Dieu Linh	Sweet, Salty (Ngot, Man)	Vietnam/Singapore
Feature	Audience Choice	Yong Shu Ling	Unteachable	Singapore
Southeast Asian Film Lab	Most Promising Project	Tan Siyou	Amoeba	Singapore

=== 2020 Silver Screen Awards ===
Category	Award	Name	Title	Country
Asian Feature	Best Film	Ivan Ayr	Milestone	India
Asian Feature	Best Director	Dea Kulumbegashvili	Beginning	Georgia/France
Asian Feature	Best Performance	Suvinder Vicky	Milestone	
Southeast Asian Short Film	Best Southeast Asian Short Film	Riar Rizaldi	Tellurian Drama	Indonesia
Southeast Asian Short Film	Best Singapore Short Film	Nelson Yeo	Here Is Not There	Singapore
Southeast Asian Short Film	Best Director	Lin Htet Aung	Estate	Myanmar
Southeast Asian Short Film	Special Mention	Ratchapoom Boonbunchachoke	Red Aninsri; Or, Tiptoeing On The Still Trembling Berlin Wall	Thailand
Youth Jury & Critics	Youth Jury Prize	Phạm Ngọc Lân	The Unseen River	Vietnam/Laos
Youth Jury & Critics	Young Critic Award	Nicole Wong Kar Mun, (Checkpoint Theatre)		
Feature	Audience Choice	Chew Chia Shao Min and Joant Úbeda	Sementara	Singapore
Southeast Asian Film Lab	Most Promising Project	Nong Nhat Quang	Baby Jackfruit Baby Guava	Vietnam
Southeast Asian Film Lab	Fellowship Prize	Charlotte Hong Bee Her	Tropical Rain, Death-Scented Kiss	Singapore

=== 2021 Silver Screen Awards ===
Category	Award	Name	Title	Country
Asian Feature	Best Film	Panah Panahi	Hit the Road	Iran
Asian Feature	Best Director	P.S Vinothraj	Pebbles	India
Asian Feature	Best Performance	Tolepbergen Baissakalov	Fire	
Southeast Asian Short Film	Best Southeast Asian Short Film	Trương Minh Quý	The Men Who Wait	France/Singapore
Southeast Asian Short Film	Best Singapore Short Film	Lucy Davis	{if your bait can sing the wild one will come} Like Shadows Through Leaves	Singapore
Southeast Asian Short Film	Best Director	Mark Chua, Lam Li Shuen,	A Man Trembles	Singapore
Southeast Asian Short Film	Special Mention	Mo Mo, Leila Macaire	1 February	France/Myanmar
Youth Jury & Critics	Youth Jury Prize	Huỳnh Công Nhớ	Grandma's Broken Leg	Vietnam
Youth Jury & Critics	Young Critic Award	Tracey Toh Xiu Si		
Feature	Audience Choice	Quen Wong	Some Women	Singapore
Southeast Asian Film Lab	Most Promising Project	Ukrit Sa-Nguanhai	The Itinerant	Thailand
Southeast Asian Film Lab	Fellowship Prize	Paul Rembert	Rafael	Philippines
Southeast Asian Film Lab	Fellowship Prize	Pham Hoang Minh Thy	Daughter Of The Mountain God	Vietnam

=== 2022 Silver Screen Awards ===
Outstanding Contribution to Southeast Asian Cinema Award		In-Docs (Indonesia)		
Category	Award	Name	Title	Country
Asian Feature	Best Film	Makbul Mubarak	Autobiography	Indonesia/France/ Germany/Poland/ Singapore/Philippines/Qatar
Asian Feature	Best Director	Laha Mebow	Gaga	Taiwan
Asian Feature	Best Performance	Zukhara Sanzysbay	Convenience Store	
Asian Feature	Special Mention	Sorayos Prapapan	Arnold Is a Model Student	Thailand/Singapore/France/ Netherlands/Philippines
Southeast Asian Short Film	Best Southeast Asian Short Film	Bayu Prihantoro Filemon	Vania on Lima Street	Indonesia
Southeast Asian Short Film	Best Singapore Short Film	Alvin Lee	Smoke Gets in Your Eyes	Singapore
Southeast Asian Short Film	Best Director	Le Lam Vien	FIX ANYTHING	Vietnam
Southeast Asian Short Film	Best Performance	Bopha Oul	Further and Further Away	
Southeast Asian Short Film	Special Mention	Gabriela Serrano	Dikit	Philippines
Youth Jury & Critics	Young Critic Award	Benjamin Yap Kee Siang		
Feature	Audience Choice	Marusya Syroechkovskaya	How to Save a Dead Friend	Sweden/Norway/ France/Germany
Southeast Asian Film Lab	Most Promising Project	Giovanni Rustanto	A Ballad of Long Hair	Indonesia
Southeast Asian Film Lab	Fellowship Prize	Gabriela Serrano	Please Bear with Me	Philippines
Southeast Asian Film Lab	Fellowship Prize	Rein Maychaelson	The Burning Land	Philippines
Southeast Asian Film Lab	Special Mention	Gladys Ng	Every Mall Burns the Same	Singapore

=== 2023 Silver Screen Awards ===
Cinema Icon Award		Fan Bingbing		
Outstanding Contribution to Southeast Asian Cinema Award		White Light Post		
Category	Award	Name	Title	Country
Asian Feature	Best Film	Pham Thien An	Inside the Yellow Cocoon Shell	Vietnam/Singapore/ France/Spain
Asian Feature	Best Director	Yoon Eun-kyung	The Tenants	South Korea
Asian Feature	FIPRESCI	Yoon Eun-kyung	The Tenants	South Korea
Asian Feature	Best Screenplay	Yu Yi-Hsun	A Journey in Spring	Taiwan
Asian Feature	Best Performance	Yang Kuei-Mei	A Journey in Spring	Taiwan
Asian Feature	Special Mention	Nelson Yeo	Dreaming & Dying	Singapore
Southeast Asian Short Film	Best Southeast Asian Short Film	J.T. Trinidad	The River That Never Ends	Philippines
Southeast Asian Short Film	Special Mention	Emerald Romero	The River That Never Ends	Philippines
Southeast Asian Short Film	Best Singapore Short Film	Giselle Lin	I Look Into the Mirror and Repeat to Myself	Singapore
Southeast Asian Short Film	Best Director	Sam Manacsa	Cross My Heart and Hope to Die	Philippines
Southeast Asian Short Film	Best Performance	Fredy Sreudeman Wowor	Of Other Tomorrows Never Known	Indonesia/Germany
Southeast Asian Short Film	Best Screenplay	Lin Htet Aung	Once Upon a Time There Was a Mom	Myanmar
Youth Jury & Critics	Young Critic Award	Saksham Mehrotra		
Feature	Audience Choice	Mohamed Kordofani	Goodbye Julia	Sudan/Egypt/ Germany/France/ Saudi Arabia/ Sweden
Southeast Asian Film Lab	Most Promising Project	Shelby Kho	Terbakar	Indonesia/Singapore
Southeast Asian Film Lab	Fellowship Prize	Lin Htet Aung	Making a Sea	Myanmar
Southeast Asian Film Lab	Special Mention	Caloy Limjap Soliongco	Day Tripper	Philippines
Southeast Asian Film Lab	Special Mention	Seth Cheong	Blue Buildings	Singapore

=== 2024 Silver Screen Awards ===
Cinema Icon Award	Jafar Panahi
Screen Icon Award	Lee Kang-sheng; Yang Kuei-mei

=== 2025 Silver Screen Awards ===
Cinema Icon Award	Deepa Mehta
Screen Icon Award	Youn Yuh-jung

=== 2026 Silver Screen Awards ===
Cinema Icon Award	Hirokazu Kore-eda
Screen Icon Award	Aamir Khan
