= 2010 Yuanshi County tractor attack =

- Native name: 元氏縣鏟車撞人案
- Location: 37.5039°N 114.2158°E; Yuanshi County, Hebei, China
- Date: 1 August 2010; 16 years ago c. 15:00 – c. 16:30 (China Standard Time)
- Attack type: Mass murder, vehicle ramming attack
- Weapons: Bucket loader; Crowbar; Brick
- Deaths: 11
- Injuries: 20+
- Perpetrator: Li Xianliang

On 1 August 2010, a mass murder occurred in Yuanshi County, Hebei, China. Over the course of two hours, an intoxicated man used a bucket loader to ram into pedestrians, buildings, and other vehicles, in and around Nanzuo, killing 11 people and injuring 20 others. The attacker was subdued by intervening citizens.

== Incident ==
=== Prelude ===
Li Xianliang (李献良) was from Chicun village in Zhaotong Township, part of Yuanshi County. Li, aged 36 at the time of the attack, worked as a forklift operator for a coal yard of Shengxing Chemical Co. Ltd. outside of Nanzuo since 2008. He resigned in July 2010, reportedly over a dispute over higher compensation.

In the morning 1 August 2010, Li came to the coal yard for his final day of work, receiving his last wages up front before attending a farewell banquet organised by his manager. During the dinner, Li drank "a considerable amount" of baiju liquor, with his blood alcohol content measuring 154 milligrams per 100 millilitres during a breathalyzer test at 20:00, around five or six hours later.

=== Attack ===
At approximately 15:00, Li was in the process of using a loader to fill coal into a truck from Qianxian when the truck driver, Qian, accused Li of mixing in coal dust and gangue into the order. An argument broke out, which was broken up by the coal yard's owner, Zhang. Li subsequently re-entered the shovel loader and rammed a makeshift annex building, killing a resting customer inside.

At 15:47, Li drove the loader out of the yard onto Jingyuan Road. After ramming into the wall of another nearby coal yard, the loader continued west, purposely ramming other vehicles and steering into pedestrians. At about 16:00, after driving two kilometres, Li turned south into the residential area of Nanzuo, where a street market was being held. In town, he crashed into parked vehicles and intentionally ran over small shops and pedestrians.

Several passersby intervened to stop the attack. A father-son pair, Wang Zhuhua and Wang Xiaobo, threw stones at the cab, with the young Wang climbing onto the cab, stabbing the driver with a cleaver, and remaining on the vehicle as it drove out of town back to the coal yard. The driver got out and tried to attack the passersby with a crowbar and a brick before being subdued, after a neighbour of the Wangs, Wang Xinjiang, threw a stone in his face. Eight of the victims died at the scene of the attack, while another three died in a hospital. The youngest victim was five years old. The attack lasted for about an hour.

== Aftermath ==
The attack followed unrelated attacks on schools elsewhere in China; the Chinese government removed some mentions of the incidents from the internet in China for fear that mass coverage of such violence can provoke copycat attacks. The various attacks on anonymous people and an attack on police have resulted in calls for better mental health care, as mental health problems often go undiagnosed and untreated in China. As a result, 550 new mental health clinics were opened and security was increased outside primary schools and nurseries all over China.

== See also ==
- List of countries by intentional homicide rate
- 2001 Shijiazhuang bombings
- Marvin Heemeyer
- 2008 Jerusalem bulldozer attack
- 2014 Jerusalem tractor attack
- Vehicular homicide
