= Chengqu =

Chengqu (simplified Chinese: 城区; traditional Chinese: 城區; pinyin: Chéngqū, literally "urban area" or "urban district") may refer to the following locations in the People's Republic of China:

== Districts ==
- Chengqu, Shanwei, Guangdong
- Chengqu, Jincheng, Shanxi
- Chengqu, Yangquan, Shanxi

== Subdistricts ==
- Chengqu Subdistrict, Jingning County, Gansu
- Chengqu Subdistrict, Laoting County, Hebei
- Chengqu Subdistrict, Yuanshi County, Hebei
- Chengqu Subdistrict, Ning'an, Heilongjiang
- Chengqu Subdistrict, Fuxin County, Fuxin Mongol Autonomous County, Liaoning
- Chengqu Subdistrict, Lingwu, Ningxia
- Chengqu Subdistrict, Rushan, Shandong
- Chengqu Subdistrict, Hejin, Shanxi
- Chengqu Subdistrict, Lop County, Hotan Prefecture, Xinjiang
- Chengqu Subdistrict, Gejiu, Yunnan
