= Jicun =

Jicun may refer to the following locations in China:

- Jicun, Hebei (姬村镇), town in Yuanshi County
- Jicun, Jiangxi (吉村镇), town in Dayu County
- Jicun, Shanxi (冀村镇), town in Fenyang
