= Yuanshi =

Yuanshi is the pinyin romanization of various Chinese names.

It may refer to:

- The Yuanshi Era (元始) during the rule of the Ping Emperor of the Han Dynasty in Chinese history
- Yuanshi County (元氏县), Hebei, China
- Yuanshi (元史), the Chinese name of the History of Yuan, the earlier of the two official Chinese histories of the Yuan Dynasty

== See also ==
- Yuanshi Tianzun (元始天尊), one of the highest deities of religious Taoism
