= Yang Jia =

Chinese man executed for killing police officers

- Born: 27 August 1980; Beijing, China
- Died: 26 November 2008 (aged 28); Shanghai, China
- Cause of death: Execution by lethal injection
- Occupation: Unemployed
- Conviction: Murder (x6)
- Penalty: Death

Details
- Date: 1 July 2008
- Locations: Shanghai, China
- Target: Shanghai Municipal Public Security Bureau
- Killed: 6
- Injured: 4
- Weapons: Knife; Molotov cocktails Hammer (unused)

Yang Jia (simplified Chinese: 杨佳; traditional Chinese: 楊佳; pinyin: Yáng Jiā; 27 August 1980 – 26 November 2008) was a Chinese citizen executed for murdering six Shanghai police officers with a knife.

Yang received international media attention for the public sympathy accorded to him in China, where, according to exiled writer Ma Jian, Yang has become "a sort of national hero." Beijing lawyer and blogger Liu Xiaoyuan prominently defended Yang.

== Background ==
Yang, an unemployed 28-year-old Beijing resident described as a loner, was reported to have been arrested and interrogated by the Shanghai police in October 2007 for riding an unregistered bicycle. According to his later testimony in court, he was insulted during the interrogation and beaten after being brought back to the station, leaving bruises on his arms and back. He then sued the police for maltreatment, to no avail.

== Stabbings ==
According to Chinese authorities and media, Yang Jia ignited eight petrol bombs at the front gate of the police headquarters in Zhabei, a Shanghai suburb, at about 9:40 am, 1 July 2008. He then stabbed security guard Gu Jianming, who tried to stop Yang, with a knife. Subsequently, Yang charged into the building and randomly stabbed nine unarmed police officers, four in the lobby and duty room and five more while making his way up to the 21st floor, before police managed to subdue him.

Six policemen suffered stab wounds in their lungs, livers and necks and bled to death. Besides the knife and molotov cocktails, Yang carried with him a hammer, a dust mask and tear gas spray.

=== Victims ===
- Supervisor 1st Class Ni Jingrong (倪景荣), 47, 27 years in police service, Han Chinese, former head of the Shanghai Municipal Public Security Bureau Zhabei Subbureau's Logistics office; Recipient of Meritorious Service Medal 3rd class twice.
- Supervisor 2nd Class Fang Fuxin (方福新), 50, 15 years in police service, Han Chinese, part of the Shanghai Municipal Public Security Bureau Zhabei Subbureau Public Order Division
- Supervisor 1st Class Zhang Yijie (张义阶), 56, 26 years in police service, Han Chinese, Former deputy team leader and team political commissar of the Shanghai Municipal Public Security Bureau Zhabei Subbureau SWAT team
- Supervisor 3rd Class Zhang Jianping (张建平), 47, 27 years in police service, Han Chinese, part of the Shanghai Municipal Public Security Bureau Zhabei Subbureau Kaifeng road police station
- Supervisor 2nd Class Xu Weiya (徐维亚), 48, 15 years in police service, Han Chinese, part of the Shanghai Municipal Public Security Bureau Zhabei Subbureau Traffic Police Division
- Supervisor 2nd Class Li Kenan (李珂男), 49, 15 years in police service, Hui, part of the Shanghai Municipal Public Security Bureau Zhabei Subbureau Technology office

== Trial and execution ==
Yang's trial was delayed on account of the 2008 Summer Olympics. On 27 August 2008, Yang was tried behind closed doors in a one-hour trial at the Shanghai No. 2 Intermediate People's Court. Four days later, the official news agency Xinhua announced that he had been found guilty of premeditated murder and received a death sentence, as had previously been expected.

The death verdict against Yang was confirmed in an appeal trial, also conducted behind closed doors, on 20 October 2008. The appeals court concluded that Yang was of sound mind.

On 21 November 2008, the Supreme People's Court of China confirmed the death verdict. Yang was executed by lethal injection on 26 November 2008.

== Media coverage and public opinion in China ==
Yang initially benefited from unusually sympathetic coverage in the state-controlled Chinese press. The Beijing News pointed out that Yang's appointed lawyer, Xie Youming, might have had a conflict of interest as he is also a legal adviser for the city district that oversees the police station at issue. Southern Weekend published a long, sympathetic front-page story, while other Chinese papers hinted that Yang was wronged and demanded a fair trial. In the week leading up to the trial, though, the Shanghai media fell silent on the case and Chinese authorities increased efforts to censor Chinese internet coverage on the subject.

While there was initial public anger at the killings, Western media noted that discourse on Chinese internet forums and blogs soon became largely sympathetic to Yang, with many expressing suspicions that Yang might not receive a fair trial and that the police might want to cover up wrongdoings of their own. The Daily Telegraph quoted one Chinese blogger as praising Yang's "strong sense of the law" and another comparing him to Wu Song, a hero in Chinese literature. A message left on Yang's MySpace account was reported to have read: "You have done what most people want to do, but do not have enough courage to do."

On 13 October 2008, a public protest in support of Yang occurred outside the Shanghai court in which Yang's appeal was heard. According to Agence France-Presse, about a dozen protesters wearing T-shirts with Yang's face showed up and were arrested by police.

After his execution, Internet tributes to Yang continued to be posted in China. Agence France-Presse reported that very few Internet users expressed the opinion that Yang deserved his fate, reproducing the following contribution by a Chinese forum user as typical of many: "When you hold a knife up to the police, it's doomed to end this way. But Chinese history will remember Yang Jia's name forever." Jeffrey L. Richey writes:

Chinese contributors to internet commentaries compared him with the traditional moral heroes Lin Chong and Wu Song, characters in the classical novel Shuihu Zhuan whose names are bywords for righteous resistance and violent revenge against corrupt authorities. Remarks, slogans, and poems posted online make clear that Yang functioned as a latter-day exemplar of both filial piety and righteous rebellion for many contemporary Chinese.

=== Musical tribute ===
Pan Gu (盤古樂隊), an underground Chinese rock band now in exile, released a five-song album named after Yang Jia, The Knife of My Home Country (故鄉的刀). One song was named after the well-known quote of Yang's: "You [the authorities] refuse to give me an explanation, I shall give you my own explanation".

=== Film ===
In 2012, Chinese director Ying Liang created When Night Falls, a film directly based on the events of Yang Jia's case and trial, told from he point of view of his mother.

== U.S. 2008 Human Rights report ==
The U.S. Department of State's 2008 Human Rights report mentioned Yang Jia:

On 26 November, Yang Jia, who was accused of killing six Shanghai police officers on 1 July, was executed following a decision by the Shanghai High Court to uphold his conviction. Yang's case included serious irregularities at trial, and the appellate court deprived him of an opportunity to be examined for mental illness despite a request by Yang's new attorney to allow it.

== See also ==
- Yongzhou courthouse shooting, a 46-year-old gunman retaliated against the judicial system.
- Weiquan movement, the Chinese civil rights movement
- Deng Yujiao incident, concerning another Chinese person accused of murder receiving popular support
- 2010 Hebei tractor rampage
