= When Night Falls =

When Night Falls may refer to:

- When Night Falls (1985 film), an Israeli film
- When Night Falls (2012 film), a Chinese film
