= Hu (vessel) =

Type of ancient Chinese bronze vessel

- gui in oracle bone script
- Traditional Chinese: 壺
- Simplified Chinese: 壶
Transcriptions
Standard Mandarin
- Hanyu Pinyin: hú
- Wade–Giles: hu^{2}
Middle Chinese
- Middle Chinese: ɦuo
Old Chinese
- Zhengzhang: *ɡʷlaː

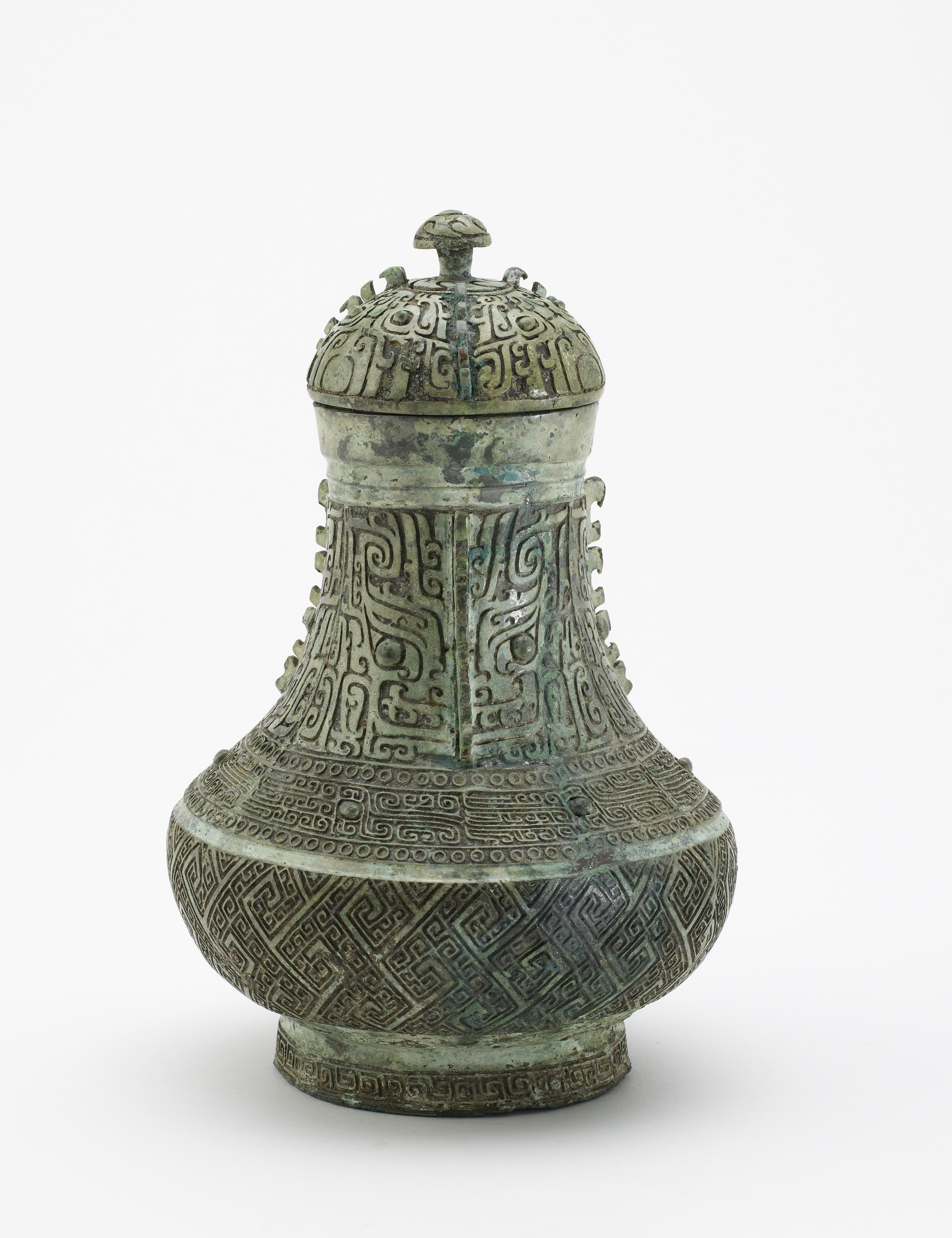
Hu vessel with masks and dragons. Shang dynasty, c. 13th century BCE. Freer Gallery of Art

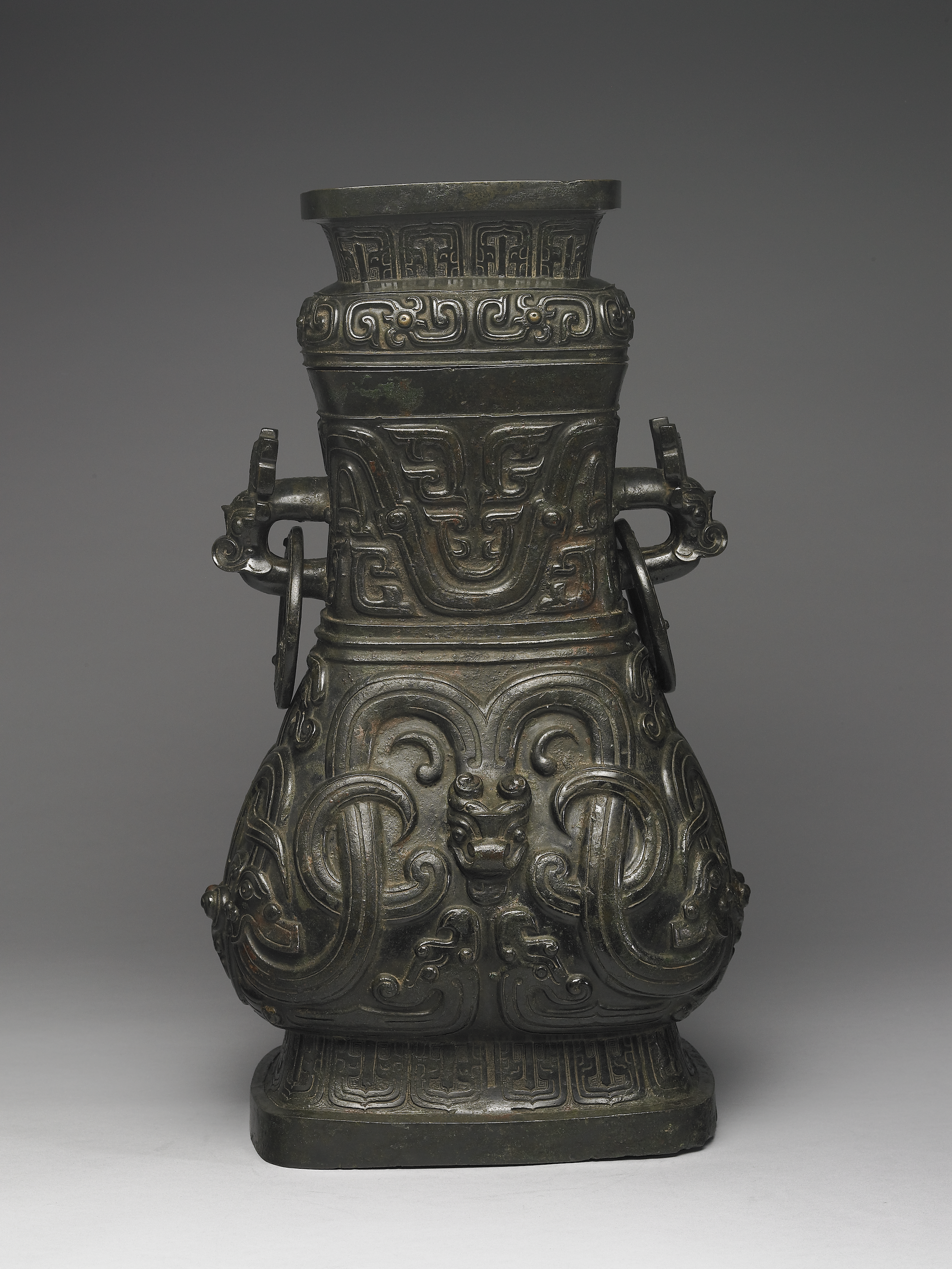
Hu wine vessel of Song, Western Zhou period, late 9th century BC，National Palace Museum, Taiwan.

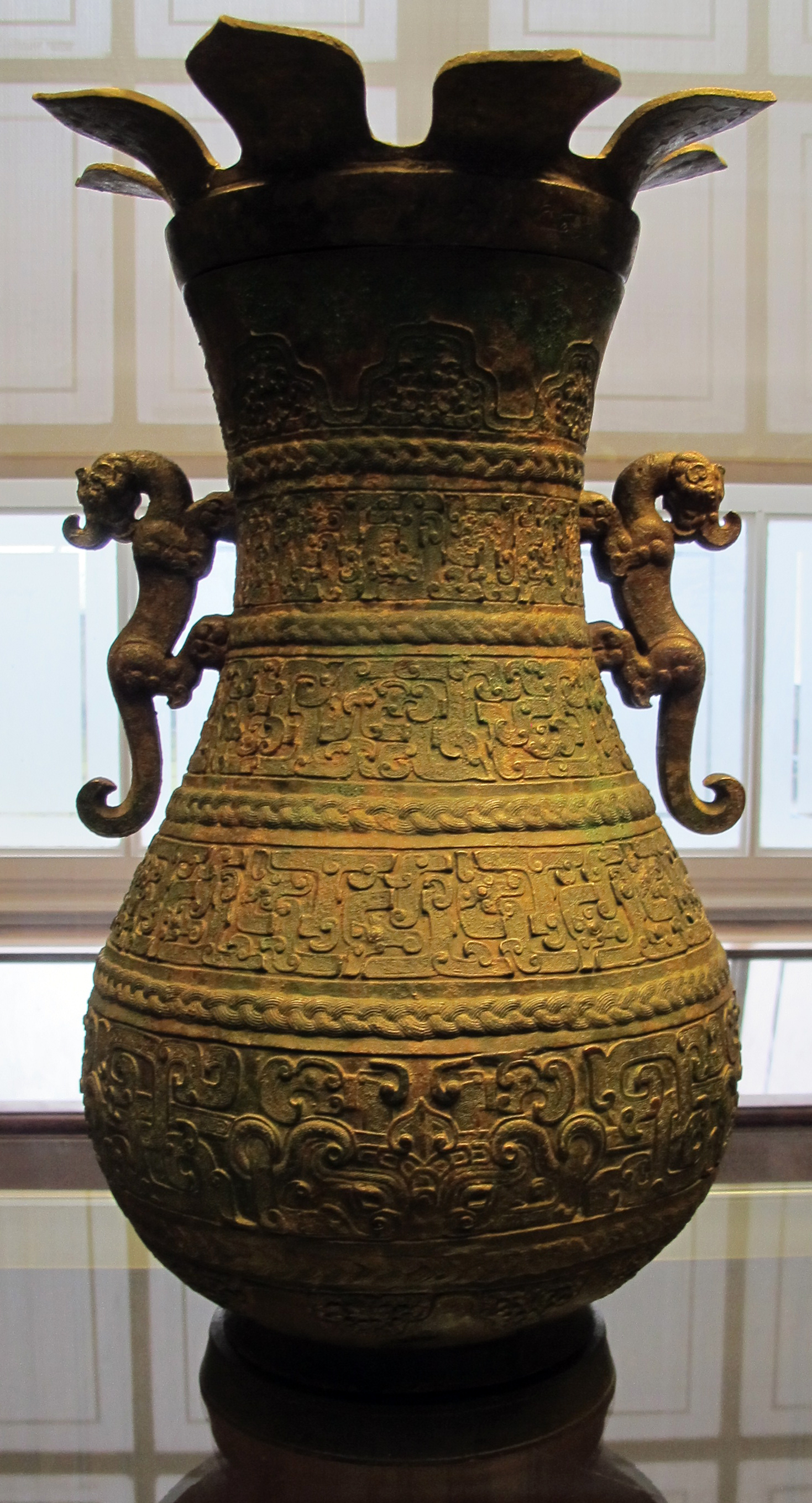
Huixian Bronze Hu at the British Museum

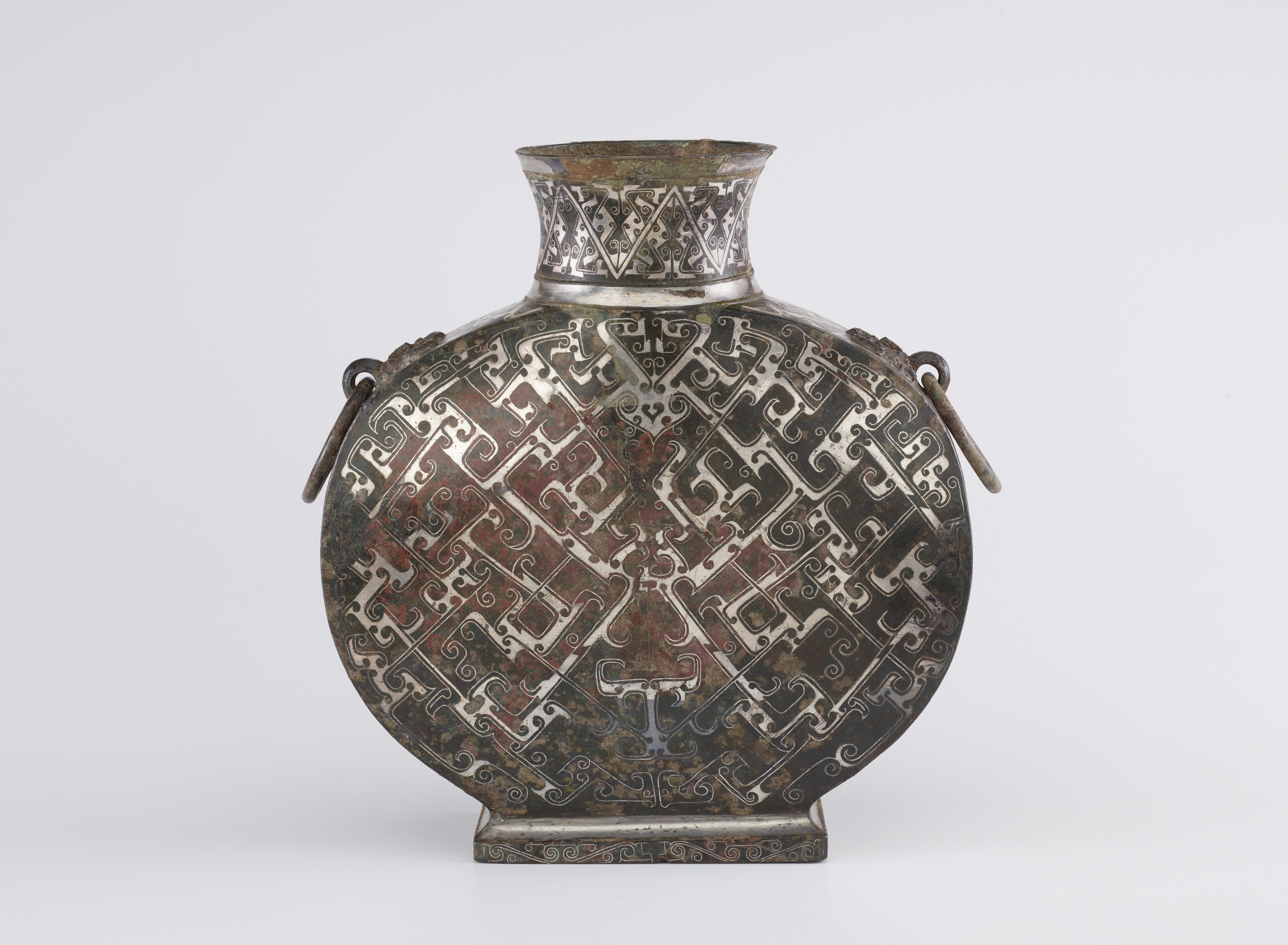
Bianhu with geometric decoration. Warring States period, c. 3rd century BCE. Freer Gallery of Art

A hu is a type of wine vessel that has a pear-shaped cross-section. Its body swells and flares into a narrow neck, creating S-shaped profile. While it is similar to you vessel, hu usually has a longer body and neck. The shape of hu probably derives from its ceramic prototype prior to the Shang dynasty (1600–1045 BC). They usually have handles on the top or rings attached to each side of neck. Many extant hu lack lids while those excavated in such tombs as Fu Hao's indicate that this type of vessel might be originally made with lids. Although it is more often to see hu having a circular body, there also appears hu in square and flat rectangular forms, called fang hu and bian hu in Chinese. In addition, hu often came to be found in a pair or in a set together with other types of vessels. As wine had played an important part in the Shang ritual, the hu vessel might be placed in the grave of an ancestor as part of ritual in order to ensure a good relationship with ancestor's spirit.

== Historical development ==
=== Shang period (1600–1045 BC) ===
The bronze hu vessel has not been found prior to the Shang period. During this period, there are mainly two types of hu vessels. One has a small mouth and long neck; the other has wide mouth and flat ovoid cross-section. The décor on the hu in the Shang period was dominated by taotie motif and leiwen thunder pattern. Square form of hu began to appear in the end of the Shang dynasty. Because this form of hu is still uncommon at this time, its appearance in the tomb probably marks the owner's wealth and social status.

=== Western Zhou period (1045–771 BC) ===
Hu in the Western Zhou period was undergone several changes. Larger hu vessels seem to become more common after the first half of mid-Western Zhou. This is possibly a response to changes in ritual. Nevertheless, hu from the Western Zhou dynasty still mainly served as a wine vessel for the uses of ritual. In addition to the change in size, hu's previous taotie design was gradually replaced by other types of animal and geometric décor. Hu found during this time were often not from tombs, but hoards left by Zhou people, who buried their precious possessions before nomadic people's invasion. Therefore, the vessels' burial context provides less clues about their functions and meanings.

=== Eastern Zhou period (770–256 BC) ===
The East Zhou dynasty was subdivided into two periods: Spring and Autumn period (770–476 B.C.) and Warring States period (475–221 B.C.). The East Zhou witnessed the decline of central government and the rise of feudal states. It is a time of political disunity. Powerful feudal lords barely paid allegiance to Zhou kings, whose domain drastically dwindled during this time. This political situation reflects in the development of hu vessels. With the rise of local power, the regional bronze making flourished on a large scale and played an important role in forming new styles. By the late Spring and Autumn period the decoration of the vessels in some regions had reflected the influence of animal style art from Central Asian nomads. In addition, bronzes from places such as Xinzheng, Henan Province, Liyu Shanxi Province, and Houma, Shanxi Province in the Spring and Autumn period show regional hu style characterized by interlaced dragon motif.

Another development of hu vessel is that although the vessel was still used for ancestral sacrifice, it began to take on a more secular and personal usage. This seems to be evidenced by the appearance of representational décor, beginning in the Warring State period. Hu with such pictorial illustrations were often made out copper inlay. In addition, the shape of the vessel was occasionally modified, taking on a more square appearance. While the use of inlay in making bronze have appeared since the Shang dynasty, it was not until the Warring States period that saw the flowering of inlay style. Compared to other bronze vessels, the inlay technique was especially lavishly employed to create hu vessels. The sumptuous display of colors achieved by means of inlay became an essential feature of hu at this time.

=== Later developments ===
Hu continued to be cast in the Han dynasty. They were still lavishly applied with gold inlay and decorated with interlace of zoomorphic and geometric patterns. However, after Han, they mainly appear in ceramic form. In addition, their function was no longer tied to ritual offerings and is utilitarian for daily life. Hu never disappears in Chinese history. Their production continues today.

== Function and use ==
Most Chinese bronze vessels fall into two categories, food vessels or wine vessels. Hu vessels were used for holding wine, but not as drinking vessels. By the Zhou period, hu were one of the main vessels in use. During this period the vessels were also usually offered in pairs, and increased dramatically in size over their Shang predecessors. Two hu recovered from the Tomb of Marquis Yi of Zeng were each 39 in (99 cm) high and weighed 529 lb (240 kg) apiece.

Hu were an important part of religious and cultural rituals, with many falling into the category of Chinese ritual bronzes. Inscriptions in some vessels indicate that as early as the Shang dynasty, the king would give bronze vessels as gifts to deserving vassals. By 900 BCE other officials had adapted this custom. Bronzes of all types, including hu, were given for a variety of occasions: as wedding gifts, funeral items, travel tokens, and even to commemorate real estate dealings.

== Decor ==
The hu is a pear-shaped vessel that has been found in both a round and square form. Examples have been discovered with a variety of decorative motifs. During the Shang dynasty one hu would typically be offered, decorated with relatively simple taotie designs. Dragons, cattle and thunder patterns also appear on hu vessels during the Shang dynasty. During the Zhou dynasty the style of the vessel changed, with taotie being replaced by "heavy, rounded relief figures on a plain ground". Though, one example from the Late Zhou period shows the entire vessel covered with images that correspond with everyday life. Silk worm farming, hunting, archery, and warfare are all represented. Interlacing dragon motifs were also popular during the Zhou period, as were "wave" designs. By the late Spring and Autumn period the decoration of the vessels in some regions had changed to reflect the influence of animal style art from Central Asian nomads. Hu of this type often used designs that were geometric versions of earlier Taotie motifs and employed copper inlay. During the Warring States period the shape of the vessel was occasionally modified, taking on a more squared appearance. This squared version of a hu is referred to as a fāng hú. Another variation was the yu, which added a single handle arching above the lid of the vessel.

== Symbolism ==
Some of the symbols in hu vessels are Taotie or demon face, dragons, realistic animals and birds, and some of the abstract symbols like bowstrings meanings were unknown. The Taotie or demon face and dragons were associated with land and rain, the farmers worshiped them for fertile land and receiving rain because three thousand years ago, rain was a concern to the farmers and they depended on the deities to bring rainfall to their land. The iconography in hu vessels were not just for the decorative aspects of the vessels since it was also important for the ritual ceremonies and their cult. The symbols in hu vessels also acted as protection against evil spirits and to being good fortune. If the symbols in the vessels were inaccurate then it was regarded as an unfortunate sin.

In the Warring States period, a hu was found with pictorial decoration and it was also called the Baihuatan Hu and it was from a tomb in Chengdu. In this contained scenes of people hunting, having an archery tournament, preparation of food, women and children collecting mulberries from the mulberry tree with baskets, musicians, dancers and wild geese. In the lid of the vessel there were animals but there were no humans figures in those.

== Historical and cultural references ==
Although the hu vessels have many cultural references to it, one of the most important ones is that it was used as a "Wine Vessel" in many cultures. Hu vessel found in the tomb at Chengdu, was used for storing grain wine. In one of the tomb, the hu vessel was kept at the foot of the deceased and it contained weapons and tools and there was no trace of food offerings. Hu vessel called the Zhong Bo Hu was regarded as a bridal gift in the Middle Western Zhou period and in the latter half of the Middle Western Zhou period, large hu vessels were seen as fashionable rather than as a ritual vessel. The inscriptions of the Zhong Bo Hu revealed that it was for the use of the sons and grandsons of the brides. Hu vessels were also considered to be as heirloom vessels. In the Eastern Zhou period the hu vessel was used for funerary practices. Hu vessel meant to the Shang culture as ritual vessels.

Baihutan Hu vessel from the Warring States period was used to convey a story about their daily activities as well as about the archery tournament and the theme of the story was about the activities of Nobility. Imagery such as the one depicted in the Baihuatan Hu vessel was never seen before, and they were extremely rare in the Zhou art.

== Important examples ==
=== Shang period ===
Bronze hu

- Period: Shang dynasty
- Date: c. 1300–1045 B.C.
- Dimension: H: 35.9 cm

Bronze hu

- Period: Shang dynasty
- Date: c. 1300–1030 B.C.
- Dimension: H: 34.8 cm

Fu Hao hu

- Period: late Shang period
- Date: c. 1300–1030 B.C.
- Location: Tomb of Fu Hao, Anyang, Henan Province
- Dimension: H: 51.5 cm

Excavated from the tomb of Fu Hao, this hu vessel was decorated with seven registers. The taotie in these registers were raised in high relief against the flattened leiwen pattern. The vertical flange in the center and horizontal divisions among registers clearly separate the decorative details into compartments. These renderings of the vessel bring forth a clear view of taotie. The name of Fu Hao was inscribed on the bottom of the bronze. This work exemplifies the style of hu in the late Shang period.

=== Western Zhou period ===
Bronze hu

- Period: Early Western Zhou period
- Date: c. 1000 B.C.
- Dimension: H: 41.3 cm

Hu wine vessel of Yin-gou

- Period: Mid-Western Zhou period
- Date: c. 900–800 B.C.
- Dimension: H: 58.5 cm

Bronze hu

- Period: Late Western Zhou period
- Date: c. 800 B.C.
- Dimension: H: 45.5 cm

Pair of Hu

- Period: Late Western Zhou period
- Date: c. late 800–700 B.C.
- Dimension: H: 54.9 cm

=== Eastern Zhou period ===
Bronze hu

- Period: Spring and Autumn period
- Date: c. 700 B.C.
- Location: Jingshan Xian, Hubei Province
- Dimension: H: 66 cm

This bronze is one of pairs found in a hoard at Jingshan in Hubei Province. The body of the vessel was decorated with wave patterns flowing unbroken throughout the surface. The frieze on the neck was composed of two gui dragons in a symmetrical layout. The rendering of this vessel continues the bronze style of the late Western Zhou.

Bronze Fang (square) hu

- Period: Spring and Autumn period
- Date: c. 600–500 B.C.
- Location: Xinzheng, Henan Province
- Dimension: H: 118 cm

Bronze hu

- Period: Late Spring and Autumn period
- Date: c. early 400 B.C.
- Location: Liyu, Shanxi Province
- Dimension: H: 44.3 cm

Bronze Fang (square) hu

- Period: Warring States period
- Date: c. 300 B.C.
- Location: Jincun, Henan Province
- Dimension: H: 52.6 cm

Bronze Fang (square) hu

- Period: Warring States period
- Date: c. 300 B.C.
- Location: Shan Xian, Henan Province
- Dimension: H: 53 cm

Bronze hu

- Period: Warring States period
- Date: c. 400 B.C.
- Location: possibly from Liuli, Henan Province
- Dimension: H: 39.9 cm

This bronze features the decor of hunting activities. Cast in flat relief against a plain background, the decor was divided into eight registers. Beginning from the top, the second and fifth registers represent animal masks in arabesque forms. Close to the rim of the vessel was a register filled with the image of bird. Other ornaments illustrate humans engaged in hunting activities. Holding various weapons, they are all in the motion to slay animals. This decor of the vessel introduces the style borrowed from Steppe culture of Central Asia.
