= Shanghai Criminal Police =

Police bureau in Shanghai, China

Shanghai Criminal Police 上海市公安局刑事侦查总队
- Abbreviation: Shanghai SCP

Jurisdictional structure
- Operations jurisdiction: Shanghai, China
- Legal jurisdiction: Shanghai
- Primary governing body: Ministry of Public Security
- Secondary governing body: Shanghai Municipal People's Government
- General nature: Local civilian police

Operational structure
- Headquarters: No. 803 Zhongshan North 1st Road, Hongkou District, Shanghai

The Criminal Investigation Corps of the Shanghai Municipal Public Security Bureau is a functional corps of the Shanghai Municipal Public Security Bureau responsible for criminal investigation.

Due to its headquarters address at No. 803 Zhongshan North 1st Road, Hongkou District, Shanghai, it is nicknamed "Criminal Police 803" or "803". At present, the Criminal Investigation Corps and the Economic Investigation Corps have moved to the new building next to the former 803 headquarters, but the house number and code remain unchanged, and this number has become a well-known symbol of the criminal police in Shanghai.

== History ==
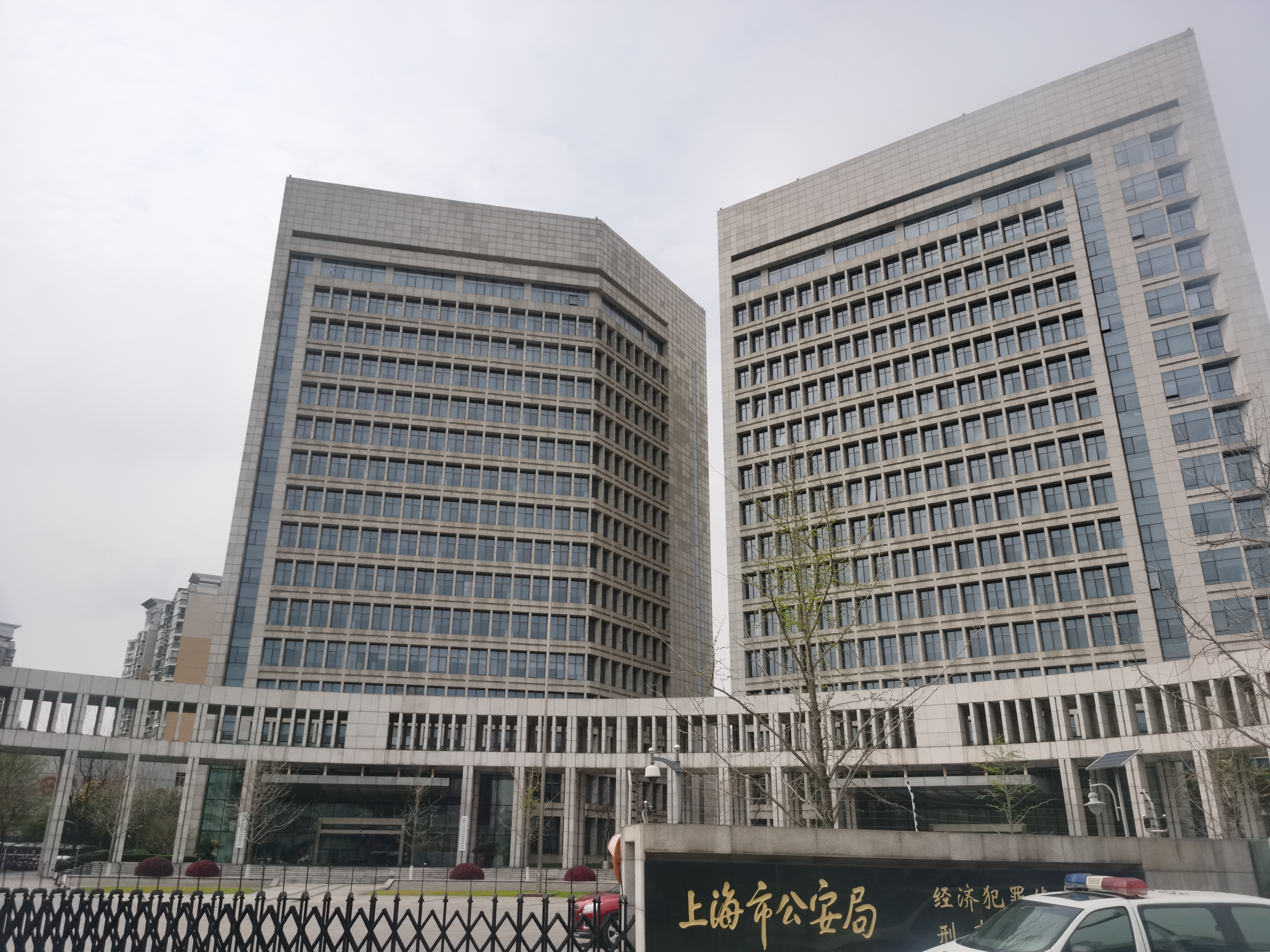
The Shanghai Criminal Police Headquarters

The history of the establishment of the Criminal Investigation Corps can be traced back to the Criminal Police Department of the Municipal Public Security Bureau, which was established after the liberation of Shanghai in 1949, and was upgraded to the Criminal Investigation Corps in 1993 and renamed the current Criminal Investigation Corps in 2000. Famous criminal policemen such as "Jiangnan Famous Detective" Duanmu Hongyu, Criminal Investigation "Three Musketeers", Sheng Lingfa, Zhang Hao, and Qian Haijun have emerged.
