= Beizheng Township, Yuanshi County =

Beizheng Township 北正乡
- Township
- Location in Hebei
- Coordinates: 37°47′09″N 114°17′04″E
- Country: People's Republic of China
- Province: Hebei
- Prefecture-level city: Shijiazhuang
- County: Yuanshi
- Village-level divisions: 9 villages
- Elevation: 166 m (545 ft)
- Time zone: UTC+8 (China Standard)
- Area code: 0311

Beizheng (Chinese: 北正; pinyin: Běizhèng) is a township of Yuanshi County, Hebei, China, located in the eastern foothills of the Taihang Mountains 21 kilometres (13 mi) west of the county seat. As of 2011, it had 9 villages under its administration.

== See also ==
- List of township-level divisions of Hebei
