= Heishuihe Township =

Heishuihe Township 黑水河乡
- Township
- Location in Hebei
- Coordinates: 37°49′41″N 114°17′59″E
- Country: People's Republic of China
- Province: Hebei
- Prefecture-level city: Shijiazhuang
- County: Yuanshi
- Village-level divisions: 12 villages
- Elevation: 187 m (614 ft)
- Time zone: UTC+8 (China Standard)
- Area code: 0311

Heishuihe (Chinese: 黑水河; pinyin: Hēishuǐhé; lit. 'black water river') is a township of Yuanshi County in southwestern Hebei province, China, located in the foothills of the Taihang Mountains about 20 kilometres (12 mi) west-northwest of the county seat. As of 2011, it has 12 villages under its administration.

== See also ==
- List of township-level divisions of Hebei
