= Suyang Township =

Coordinates: 37°44′48″N 114°24′22″E

Suyang Township 苏阳乡
- Township

Chinese transcription(s)
- Interactive map of Suyang Township
- Country: China
- Province: Hebei
- Prefecture: Shijiazhuang
- County: Yuanshi County
- Time zone: UTC+8 (China Standard Time)

Suyang Township (Chinese: 苏阳乡) is a township-level division of Yuanshi County, Shijiazhuang, Hebei, China.

== See also ==
- List of township-level divisions of Hebei
