= Crossing the Dust =

- Crossing the Dust film poster
- Directed by: Shawkat Amin Korki
- Written by: Shawkat Amin Korki
- Produced by: Hasan Ali; Nechirvan Argoshi; Turaj Aslani; Shawkat Amin Korki
- Starring: Adil Abdolrahman; Ayam Akram; Hossein Hasan; Ahlam Najat; Aba Rash; Rizgar Sedi
- Music by: Mohammad-Reza Darvishi
- Release date: 2 December 2006
- Running time: 73 minutes
- Countries: France, Iraq
- Language: Kurdish/English/Arabic

Crossing the Dust (Kurdish: Perrînewe le xobar) is a 2006 film written and directed by the Kurdish director Shawkat Amin Korki.

== Plot ==
During the fall of Saddam in 2003, two Kurds, Azad and Rashid are looking for the parents of an Arab boy named Saddam. At the same time the boy's parents are looking for him everywhere, worried because his name is now taboo. All the attempts of the two Kurds to get rid of the child fail: neither the Americans nor clerics at the mosque want him. Little Saddam begins to become a real problem. Azad overcomes ethnic differences and tries to help the boy find his parents, much to the objections of Rashid, whose family was wiped out by Iraqi troops under Saddam during the anti-Kurdish campaign in the 1980s. Azad is killed while trying to protect the boy from Saddam's troops, who want to take him back. Rashid puts aside his animosity and carries on with the task of helping the boy find his parents.

== Cast ==
- Adil Abdolrahman
- Ayam Akram
- Hussein Hassan
- Ahlam Najat
- Aba Rash
- Rizgar Sedi

== Awards ==
- Best Director, Silver Screen Award, Singapore International Film Festival, 2007.
- First Feature Award, 9th Osian Film Festival, New Delhi, 2007.
- Golden Alhambra at 1st Granada (Cines Del Sur) IFF, (Spain) 2007
- bronze Alhambra at 1st Granada (Cines Del Sur) IFF, (Spain) 2007
- Critic (Netpak) Award at 20th Singapore IFF 2007
- Golden Hanoman as best film at 2nd Jogja Asia Netpak IFF – Indonesia 2007
- Special Mention at 11 Tallinn Black Nights International Film festival 2007
- Nominee for achievement in Directing at Asia Pacific Screen Awards 2002
- Bronze prize at 5th Masqat International film Festival – Oman 2008
- Best film Award at Perspective film festival – Antwerpen, Belgium 2007
- Gran prix at Arte Mare film festival - France 2008
