= Macun Township, Hebei =

Coordinates: 37.85826°N 114.50742°E

Macun Township, Yuanshi County 马村乡
- Township

Chinese transcription(s)
- Interactive map of Macun Township, Yuanshi County
- Country: China
- Province: Hebei
- Prefecture: Shijiazhuang
- County: Yuanshi County
- Time zone: UTC+8 (China Standard Time)

Macun Township, Yuanshi County (Chinese: 马村乡) is a township-level division of Yuanshi County, Shijiazhuang, Hebei, China.

== See also ==
- List of township-level divisions of Hebei
