= Yincun, Yuanshi County =

Yincun 因村镇
- Town
- Interactive map of Yincun
- Coordinates: 37°50′29″N 114°28′18″E
- Country: People's Republic of China
- Province: Hebei
- Prefecture-level city: Shijiazhuang
- County: Yuanshi
- Elevation: 79 m (259 ft)
- Time zone: UTC+8 (China Standard)

Yincun (Chinese: 因村; pinyin: Yīncūn) is a town of Yuanshi County, in southwestern Hebei province, China, located more than 20 km (12 mi) south of Shijiazhuang, the provincial capital. As of 2011, it has 14 villages under its administration.

== See also ==
- List of township-level divisions of Hebei
