= Sucun Township, Hebei =

Coordinates: 37°47′26″N 114°20′32″E

Sucun Township 苏村乡
- Township

Chinese transcription(s)
- Interactive map of Sucun Township
- Country: China
- Province: Hebei
- Prefecture: Shijiazhuang
- County: Yuanshi County
- Time zone: UTC+8 (China Standard Time)

Sucun Township (Chinese: 苏村乡) is a township-level division of Yuanshi County, Shijiazhuang, Hebei, China.

== See also ==
- List of township-level divisions of Hebei
