= Huaiyang, Hebei =

Huaiyang 槐阳镇
- Town
- Location in Hebei
- Coordinates: 37°46′12″N 114°31′52″E
- Country: People's Republic of China
- Province: Hebei
- Prefecture-level city: Shijiazhuang
- County: Yuanshi
- Village-level divisions: 29 villages
- Elevation: 65 m (213 ft)
- Time zone: UTC+8 (China Standard)
- Postal code: 051130
- Area code: 0311

Huaiyang (simplified Chinese: 槐阳; traditional Chinese: 槐陽; pinyin: Huáiyáng) is a town of Yuanshi County in southwestern Hebei province, China, located adjacent to the county seat. As of 2011, it has 29 villages under its administration.

== See also ==
- List of township-level divisions of Hebei
