= Songcao =

Coordinates: 37°45′22″N 114°35′00″E

Songcao 宋曹镇
- Town

Chinese transcription(s)
- Interactive map of Songcao
- Country: China
- Province: Hebei
- Prefecture: Shijiazhuang
- County: Yuanshi County
- Time zone: UTC+8 (China Standard Time)

Songcao (Chinese: 宋曹镇) is a township-level division of Yuanshi County, Shijiazhuang, Hebei, China.

== See also ==
- List of township-level divisions of Hebei
