= Nanyin, Hebei =

Nanyin 南因镇
- Town
- Location in Hebei
- Coordinates: 37°47′12″N 114°36′39″E
- Country: People's Republic of China
- Province: Hebei
- Prefecture-level city: Shijiazhuang
- County: Yuanshi County
- Time zone: UTC+8 (China Standard)

Nanyin (Chinese: 南因; pinyin: Nányīn) is a town in Yuanshi County, Hebei province, China. As of 2020, it has 17 villages under its administration:

- Nanyinyijie Village (南因一街村)
- Nanyinerjie Village (南因二街村)
- Nanyinsanjie Village (南因三街村)
- Nanyinsijie Village (南因四街村)
- Nanyinzhuang Village (南因庄村)
- Jia Village (贾村)
- Tongmeilü Village (仝梅吕村)
- Meng Village (孟村)
- Beifan Village (北凡村)
- Nanfan Village (南凡村)
- Chugu Village (褚固村)
- Dongpu Village (董堡村)
- Niufangzhuang Village (牛房庄村)
- Zhaopu Village (赵堡村)
- Dongdu Village (东杜村)
- Xidu Village (西杜村)
- Beidu Village (北杜村)

== See also ==
- List of township-level divisions of Hebei
