= You (vessel) =

- Chinese: 卣
Transcriptions
Standard Mandarin
- Hanyu Pinyin: yǒu
- Wade–Giles: yu^{3}
Middle Chinese
- Middle Chinese: jɨu
Old Chinese
- Zhengzhang: *lu / *luʔ

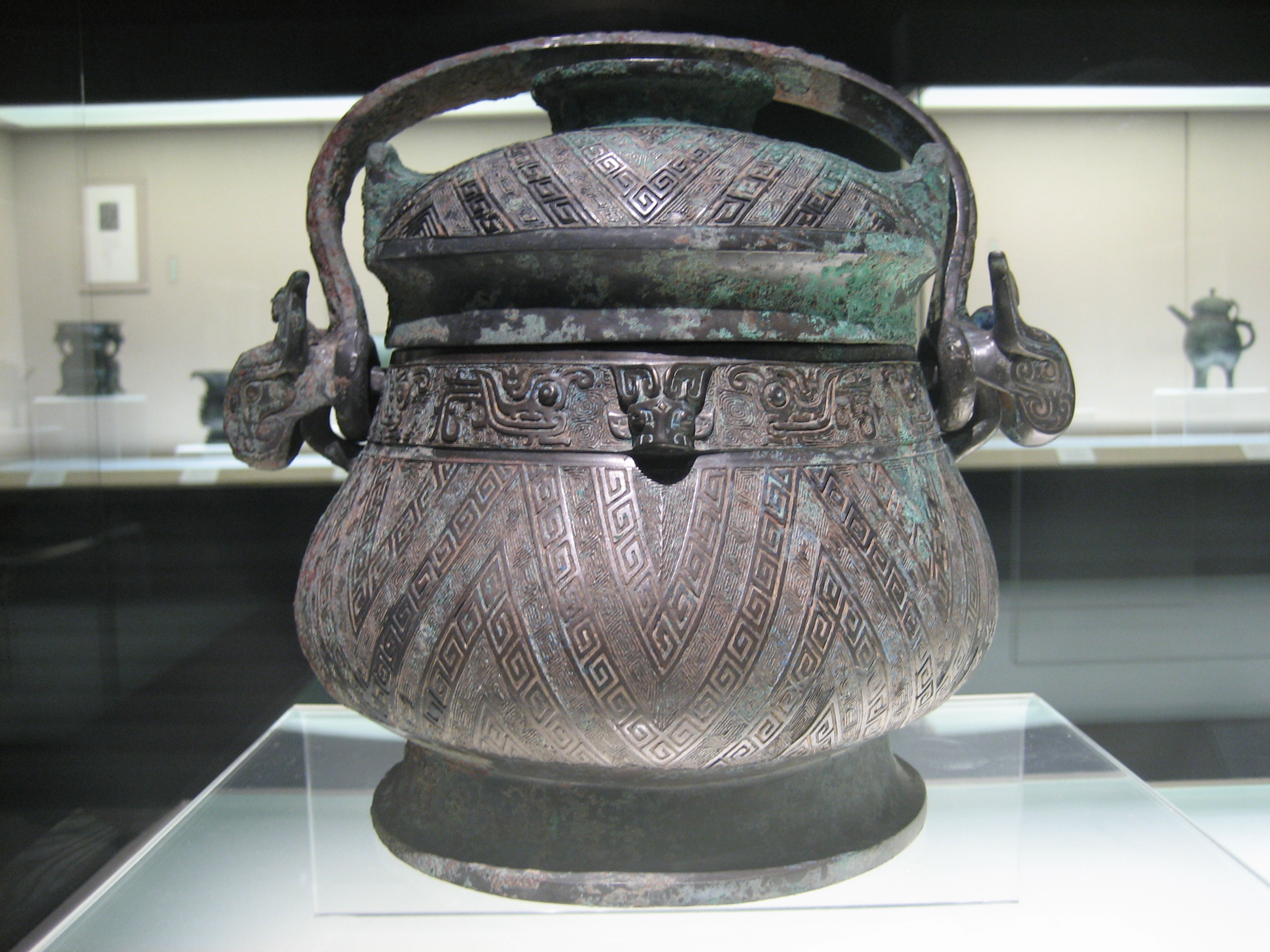
You with zigzag thunder pattern, Early Zhou, Shanghai Museum

A you (Chinese: 卣; pinyin: yǒu) is a lidded vessel that was used for liquid offerings by the Chinese of the Shang and Zhou dynasties. It sometimes lacks taotie in favor of smoother surfaces. Sometimes these vessels are zoomorphic, especially in the form of two owls back to back. Usually the handle of the you is in the form of a loop that attaches on either side of the lid, but it is occasionally a knob in the center of the lid. They can be quadruped or have a single base.

== Gallery ==
| Image | Name | Era | Time of evacuation | Place of evacuation | Current location | Notes |
|---|---|---|---|---|---|---|
| | Luan Bo Tong You (𫕉 (Note: Obsolete Chinese character, left side "阝", right side "爰".)伯铜卣, lit. "Bronze You made for Count Luan") | Western Zhou | 1999 | Baicaopo, Lingtai County, Pingliang | Gansu Provincial Museum | |
| | Yu You (圉卣) | early Western Zhou | | Liulihe Township, Fangshan District, Beijing | Capital Museum | |
| | Shu Quan Fu You (叔䟒父卣) | Western Zhou | 1978 | Xizhang Village, Dongzhang Township, Yuanshi County, Shijiazhuang | Hebei Museum | |
| | Quzhe Leiwen You (曲折雷纹卣, lit. "You with zigzag thunder pattern") | early Western Zhou | unknown | unknown | Shanghai Museum | |
| | Shoumianwen Sanzu Qingtong You (兽面纹三足青铜卣, lit. "Bronze You with beast face pattern and three feet") | Shang dynasty | 1989 | Dayangzhou, Xingan County, Ji'an | Jiangxi Provincial Museum | |
| | Hu Shi Ren You (虎食人卣, lit. "You depicting a tiger trying to devour a man") | late Shang | | Border between Anhua County, Yiyang and Ningxiang County, Changsha | Cernuschi Museum, France | Two pieces. The other piece is currently at Sen-oku Hakuko Kan, Japan. |
| | Yue Fu You (戉箙卣) | late Shang | | | Shanghai Museum | |
