= Beichu Township =

Beichu Township 北褚乡
- Township
- Location in Hebei
- Coordinates: 37°49′16″N 114°26′15″E
- Country: People's Republic of China
- Province: Hebei
- Prefecture-level city: Shijiazhuang
- County: Yuanshi
- Village-level divisions: 13 villages
- Elevation: 92 m (302 ft)
- Time zone: UTC+8 (China Standard)
- Area code: 0311

Beichu (Chinese: 北褚; pinyin: Běichǔ) is a township of Yuanshi County in southwestern Hebei province, China, located 10 kilometres (6.2 mi) northwest of the county seat. As of 2011, it had 13 villages under its administration.

== See also ==
- List of township-level divisions of Hebei
