= Huixian Bronze Hu =

Pair of bronze wine vessels found in China

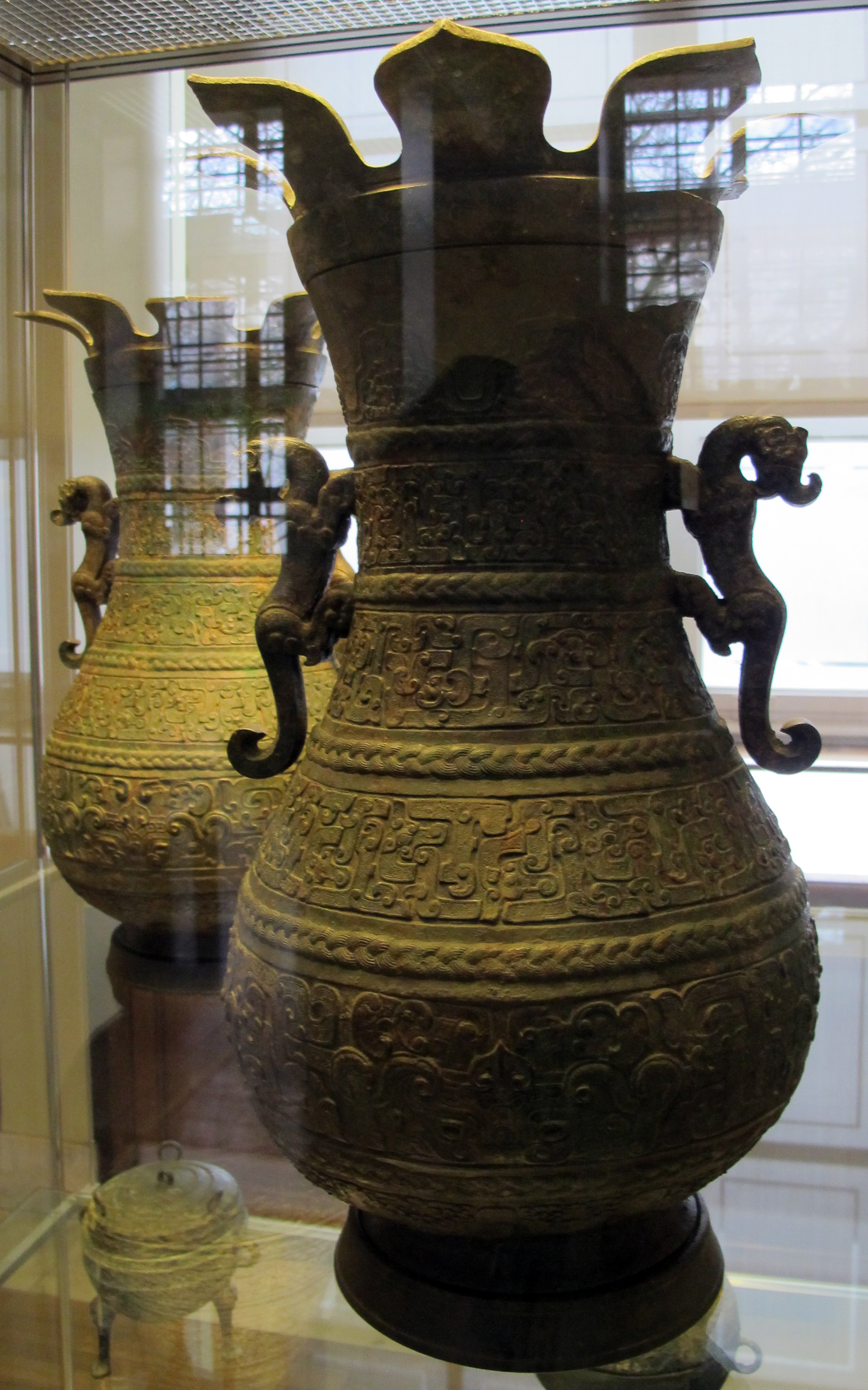
- Pair of bronze hu from Huixian on display at the British Museum
- Material: Bronze
- Size: 48.3 cm High, 17 cm Diameter
- Created: 5th Century BC
- Present location: British Museum, London
- Registration: Asia OA 1972.2-29.1.a, b

The Huixian Bronze Hu are a pair of bronze wine vessels that were found in the city of Huixian, Henan province, central China. Dating to the Eastern Zhou dynasty, they have been part of the British Museum's Asian Collections since 1972.

== Discovery ==
The two vessels were apparently found in Huixian in Henan province, although the exact circumstances of their discovery remains unclear. However, based on their manufacturing technique and design, it is evident that the hu were made at the Jin State Foundry in Houma, Shanxi province, where bronze casting was centred during the Eastern Zhou period (771-221 BC). They were bequeathed to the British Museum in 1972.

== Description ==
The pair of hu are identical in shape and size and date to the 5th Century BC. The two delicately cast containers were made through the lost wax technique. Apart from slight damage to the lower part of the vessels, they are in good condition. Their ornate decoration includes repeated bands of layered interlace intersected by roped borders. The lower band includes four taotie or monster faces composed of vipers. The handles of the two vessels are designed in the shape of prancing tigers with reverted heads, and their open lids are made in the form of petalled crowns.

== Inscription ==
On the outer rim of the lids are identical inscriptions which record the casting of the hu by Zhao Meng, a minister of the Jin State, for a meeting with the King of Wu at Huangshi in 482 BC. The purpose of such meetings was to forge alliances between different territories and the two vessels may have been made to celebrate such an agreement between the Jin and Wu states.

== See also ==
Basse Yutz Flagons for a pair of bronze wine vessels that were made at roughly the same time on the other side of the world.

== Gallery ==
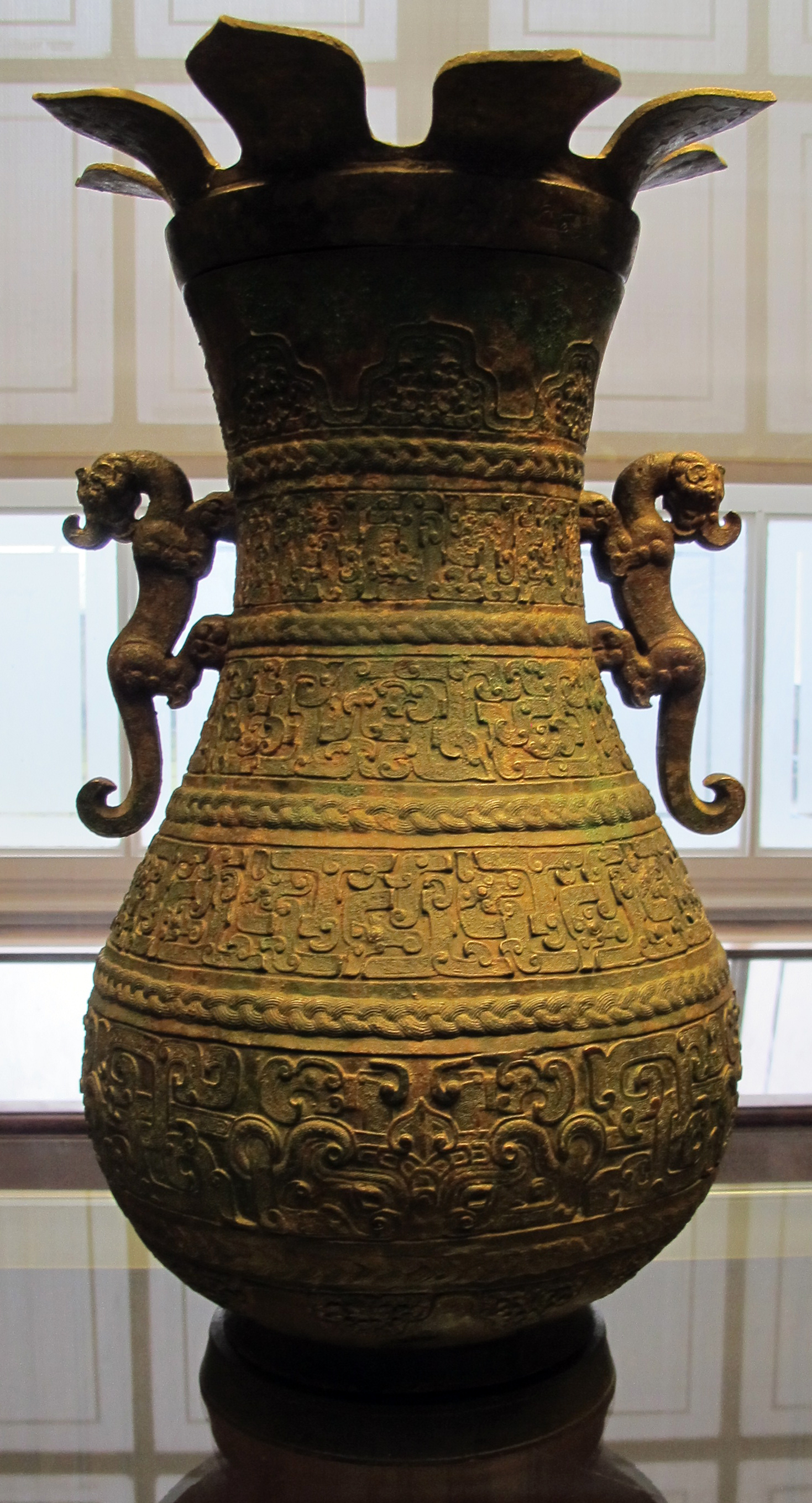
One of the hu wine vessels in more detail
