= Shanghai Municipal Public Security Bureau =

Police bureau in Shanghai, China

Shanghai Municipal Public Security Bureau 上海市公安局
- Patch of the Ministry of Public Security

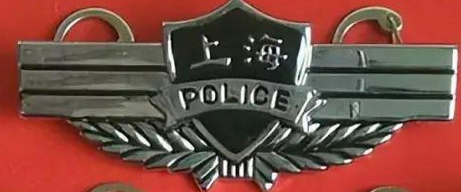
- Badge of the Shanghai Police
- Abbreviation: Shanghai PSB

Jurisdictional structure
- Operations jurisdiction: Shanghai, China
- Legal jurisdiction: Shanghai
- Primary governing body: Ministry of Public Security
- Secondary governing body: Shanghai Municipal People's Government
- General nature: Local civilian police

Operational structure
- Headquarters: No. 128 Wuning South Road, Jing'an District, Shanghai
- Officers (both sworn and auxiliary)s: Approximately 50,000 (2019)
- Agency executive: Zhang Yahong, Bureau Chief

Facilities
- Helicopters: 4 (2011)

Website
- https://gaj.sh.gov.cn/shga/index.html

The Shanghai Municipal Public Security Bureau (Shanghai PSB) is a constituent department of the Shanghai Municipal People's Government responsible for law enforcement in Shanghai. This public security bureau is under the dual leadership of the Shanghai Municipal People's Government and the Ministry of Public Security of the People's Republic of China, with 27 internal institutions. Its headquarters is located at No. 128 Wuning South Road, Jing'an District, Shanghai.

The incumbent police chief of the Shanghai PSB as of July 2025 is Zhang Yahong.

== History ==
The Shanghai PSB were the target of the Yang Jia attacks on July 1, 2008.

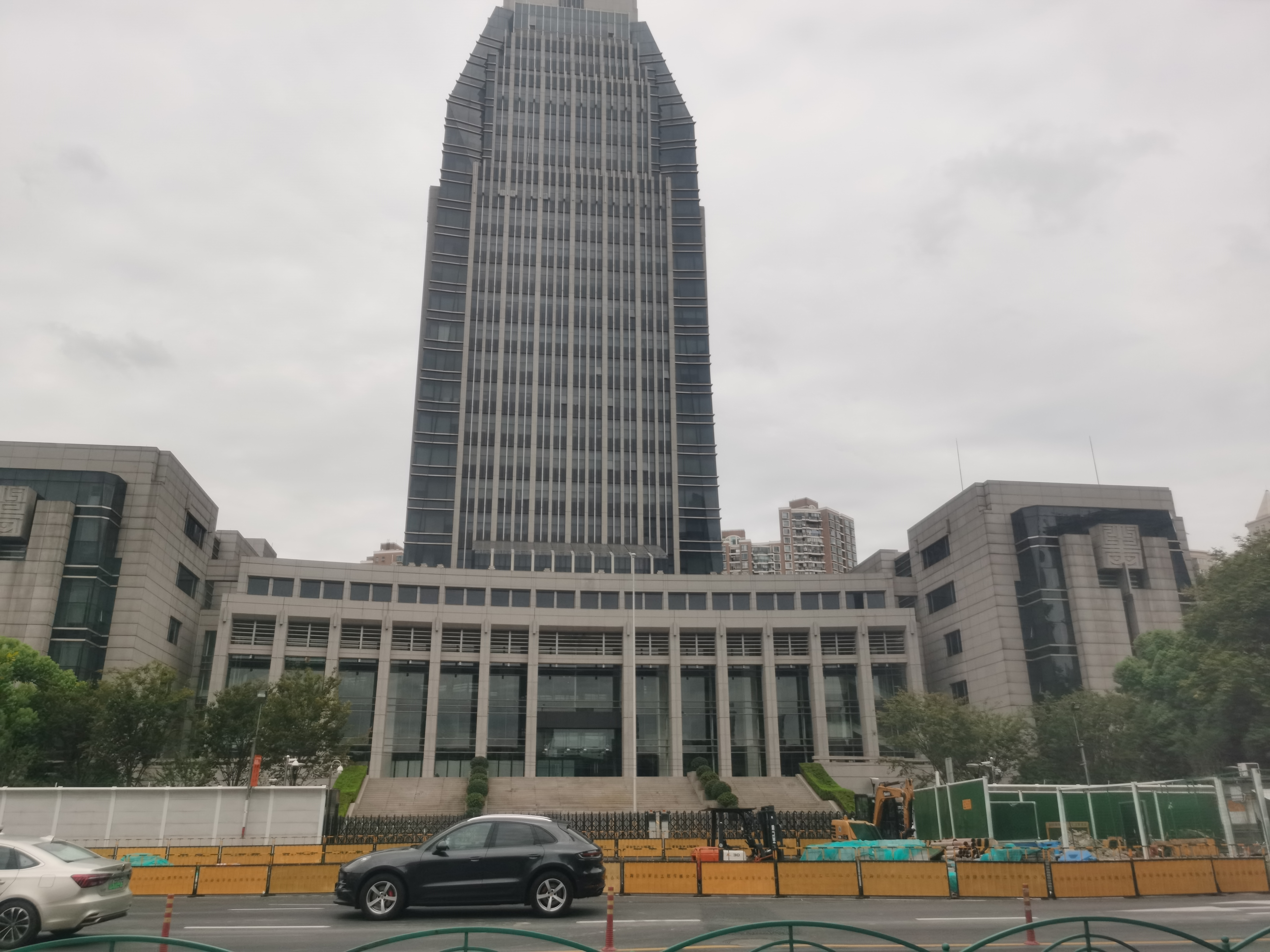
Headquarters of the Shanghai PSB

== Organization ==
As of 2024, the Shanghai PSB has an annual budget of 8.6 billion RMB.

=== Directly subordinate units ===
- Headquarters
- Research office
- Political office
- Logistics office
- Accountant office
- Supervision unit
- Emergency management center
- Economic crime investigation department
- Public order unit
- Shanghai Criminal Police
- Immigration Management Bureau
- Traffic Police unit
- Special Police Department (Shanghai SWAT)
- Border Defense and Ports subbureau
- Legal affairs unit
- Jail management unit
- Technology unit
- Cybercrime unit
- Railways and buses unit
- Chemical industries district subbureau
- Airport subbureau
- Police Aviation Force
- Population management (Census) office
- Farmland subbureau
- Data office

== Employees ==
As of 2019, including both sworn officers and auxiliary officers, the Shanghai PSB operates a total of approximately 50,000 police officers, with one of the lowest number of police officers per capita among cities of its size.

== Equipment ==
=== Firearms ===
Prior to April 2014, outside of specific units such as SWAT, Shanghai police were not permitted to carry personal firearms and instead used shared firearms. This policy was changed in April 2014, which now permitted patrol units to carry personal firearms on patrol with the Norinco 9mm Police Revolver becoming standard issue.

The reason for this policy change include lack of response speed to serious incidents such as hostage taking, along with the 2014 Kunming attack.

=== Helicopters ===
As of 2011, the Police Aviation Force owns a total of 4 helicopters, including:

- 1x Eurocopter EC120
- 2x Eurocopter EC135
- 1x Eurocopter EC155

== Line of duty deaths ==
As of April 2024, since 1949 82 officers of the Shanghai PSB have died in the line of duty.
