= Qianxian Township =

Coordinates: 37.86952°N 114.2784°E

Qianxian Township 前仙乡
- Township

Chinese transcription(s)
- Interactive map of Qianxian Township
- Country: China
- Province: Hebei
- Prefecture: Shijiazhuang
- County: Yuanshi County
- Time zone: UTC+8 (China Standard Time)

Qianxian Township (Chinese: 前仙乡) is a township-level division of Yuanshi County, Shijiazhuang, Hebei, China.

== See also ==
- List of township-level divisions of Hebei
