= Meng Ong =

Singaporean filmmaker

Meng Ong (Chinese: 王明) is a Singapore born filmmaker. He directed A Fantastic Ghost Wedding (2014) and Miss Wonton (2001).

== Career ==
He began making movies at 16 and graduated from New York University Film School. Miss Wonton is his first feature-length film, premiering at the Sundance Film Festival 2001 in the American spectrum section. He has also been selected as one of the “Directors to Watch” by filmfestivals.com. It also won the prestigious PRIX FIPRESCI International Critics Prize at the Locarno Film Festival and showcased at other festivals like Busan International Film Festival and as the opening night film at the Bite the Mango film festival in UK. The film has been released by United International Pictures in Singapore (2001) and at the Cinema Village in New York City (2002). It has been released on video by Comstar. In 2019, it was selected by Asian Film Archive for Korean Film Archive’s Asian Digitalization Project which awards films of cultural and historical significance.

Ong’s second feature, A Fantastic Ghost Wedding (aka A Chinese Ghost Wedding) was selected for the Sundance Institute June Screenwriter's Lab and the Taipei Golden Horse Promotion Project. The film stars Hong Kong veteran actress Sandra Ng and Singapore's comedian/actor Mark Lee. Ong was nominated Best New Asian Talent at the Hong Kong Asian Film Festival 2014.

For television, he directed and produced television for Channel 5 at Mediacorp Studios, Singapore. He also executive produced "Police and Thief", one of the most successful English comedies on channel 5, which ran for six seasons. He also directed the National Day telemovie, “This is My Home”. In 2019, he directed "Fried Rice Paradise", a television adaptation of Dick Lee's musical for MM2 and Mediacorp, Channel 5. In 2020, he directed "Titoudao", a TV adaptation of Goh Boon Teck's play for Oak3 films and Mediacorp channel 5.

In 2014, he was commissioned by Ministry of Defence, Singapore to direct a short film, "Hands" to commemorate Total Defence 30th anniversary.

His award winning short films and videos including, Waves of a Distant Shore, Chinadoll and Buddha’s Garden, have been shown at the Asian American Film Festival, Clermont Ferrand Short Film Festival, Philadelphia International Film Festival, the MIX Festival in New York, the Young ASEAN filmmakers Festival in Japan and more. He is a multiple winner at the Silver Screen Awards at the Singapore International Film Festival including winner of two Best Director Awards.

He is currently an adjunct lecturer at Temasek Polytechnic, teaching digital film and television.

== Filmography ==
Year	Title	Format	Position
1991	Chinadoll	Documentary Short	director/writer
1992	Waves of a Distant Shore	Short Film	director/writer
1993	Buddha’s Garden	Short Film	director/writer
1995	The Wooden Clogs	Video Short	director/writer
2001	Miss Wonton	Feature Film	director/writer
2001–2007	Chinese Ghost Wedding	Feature Screenplay	director/writer
2002/2003	First Touch Season 2	Television series	director
2004	Family Business	Television pilot	director/writer/Executive Producer
2004	Police and Thief	Television series	director
2004/2005	White Snake	Television Pilot	director/writer/Executive Producer
2005	Police and Thief 2	TV series	director/Executive Producer
2006	Police and Thief 3	TV series	director/Executive Producer
2007	Police and Thief 4	TV series	director/writer/Executive Producer
2007	"As the Bell Rings" Disney Channel Pilot		director
2008	'Police and Thief 5"	"TV Series	director/writer/ExecutiveProducer
2008	"Yang Sisters 2"	TV series	director
2009/2010	"Police and Thief 6"	TV series	director/Executive Producer
2009	"This is my Home"	TV movie	director
2014	"Hands"	Total Defence 30th anniversary short film	director
2014	"A Fantastic Ghost Wedding"	Feature Film	writer/director
2017	"Seabreeze"	Short for Channel News Asia	writer/director
2019	"Fried Rice Paradise"	TV series	director
2019	"Love by Numbers"	TV series	director
2020	"Titoudao"	TV series	director
