= The Other Half (2006 Chinese film) =

- Film poster
- Traditional Chinese: 另一半
- Simplified Chinese: 另一半
- Hanyu Pinyin: lìng yībàn
- Directed by: Ying Liang
- Written by: Ying Liang; Peng Shan
- Produced by: Peng Shan
- Starring: Zeng Xiaofei; Deng Gang; Zhao KeChow
- Cinematography: Li Rongsheng; Ying Liang
- Edited by: Ying Liang
- Music by: Ko Kyota; Zhang Xiao
- Production company: 90 Minutes Film Studio
- Distributed by: dGenerate Films
- Release date: March 24, 2007 (China)
- Running time: 111 minutes
- Country: China
- Language: Mandarin

The Other Half (Chinese: 另一半; pinyin: lìng yībàn) is an independent Chinese film. It is the second feature from Chinese director Ying Liang.

== Synopsis ==
A sensitive and ironic portrayal of life in a Chinese industrial town, where a law clerk contends with her clients’ litany of woes, her shady boyfriend's gambling addiction, her estranged father and the threat of toxic pollution.

Xiaofen works as a clerk at a law firm located in a developing city in Southwestern China. Her job is to meet different female clients of the firm and document each case. However, just like the female clients involved in those lawsuits, Xiaofen is also in trouble. She feels anxious and unsafe. Her boyfriend, who was living with her, goes missing, possibly because he was a murderer. And her mother and her women friends lead unsettled lives.

This movie consists of two alternating parts. One part comprises the actual, true stories told by the female clients whom Xiaofen meets in her job. The other part is the narrative about Xiaofen herself and her female friends. The intention of the film's structure is to present a contemporary report on the status of women living in an inland city in China.

== Awards ==
- Woosuk Award at the Jeonju International Film Festival 2007
- Special Jury Award at the Singapore International Film Festival 2007
- The Special Jury Prize Kodak VISION Award at Tokyo Filmex 2006

== Film festivals ==
- New Directors/New Films at The Museum of Modern Art and the Film Society of Lincoln Center
- Mosaïques 2007
- The 31st Hong Kong International Film Festival 第三十一屆香港國際電影節
- The 50th San Francisco International Film Festival
