= When Night Falls (2012 film) =

- Film poster
- Directed by: Ying Liang
- Written by: Ying Liang
- Produced by: Ying Liang; Peng Shan; Tami Xu (Qian-Chun)
- Starring: An Nai
- Cinematography: Ryuji Otsuka
- Edited by: Tong Wai-Wing
- Production company: 90 Minutes Film Studio
- Release date: 28 April 2012
- Running time: 70 minutes
- Countries: China; South Korea
- Language: Chinese

When Night Falls is a 2012 docudrama from Chinese independent film director Ying Liang. The film is based on the real-life criminal case of Yang Jia, a Chinese man who killed six police officers after being arrested and beaten for riding a bicycle without a license. After the film's screening, threats of arrest from Chinese authorities resulted in Ying being exiled from Shanghai. Ying won best director at the Locarno Film Festival.

== Plot summary ==
The film focuses on a partly fictionalized account of the real-life case of a Chinese man who killed six policemen after he was continually harassed by them. The incident started after he was beaten and taken into custody for riding a bicycle without a license. The plot is from his mother's perspective.

== Production ==
The film is based on the criminal case of a Chinese man named Yang Jia, who was arrested and beaten because he rode a bicycle without a license. Despite repeated complaints by Yang Jia, the police would not stop their harassment. As a result, Yang Jia killed six policemen with a knife and later received a death sentence. Film director Ying Liang said that he could relate to the incident and said, "When I was 11, my father was kept away from home for three years. And my mother's reaction to this family disaster is unforgettable."

The finished film was first screened at the Joenju International Film Festival in May 2012. Subsequently, while Ying was in South Korea, he heard from his mother through a phone call that he would be arrested if he returned to Shanghai. Reportedly, policemen arrived to talk to Ying's family in Shanghai several times while using "intimidating words". Chinese authorities also offered to buy the film's rights from its South Korean owner for $5 million. Ying is still exiled from Shanghai and currently lives in Hong Kong.

“I have only two choices at present: stay outside of mainland China, or return. The first choice can ensure my safety. If I were to take the second option now, I would lose my freedom. I’m not all that worried about this, but I need to carefully consider whether this decision would result in something worthwhile.”

— Ying Liang

== Reception ==
Stephen Dalton, writing for The Hollywood Reporter, wrote, "In the light of such state-sponsored bullying, it feels churlish to criticize When Night Falls for its minimal entertainment value. But the pacing is painfully slow in places, while the lack of factual background seems to undermine Ying's intention to illuminate an infamous injustice".

Richard Brody of The New Yorker said, "It's a marvellous work of cinematic art, but it's also a horrifically fascinating and deeply poignant view of a non-independent judicial system at work: its subject, in effect, is procedural injustice".

Ying was awarded best director at the Locarno Film Festival, while An Nai won best actress.

== Chinese government bans ==
According to the Epoch Times, in order to ban When Night Falls, the Shanghai Municipal Government offered 55 million yuan to buy the film from the Jeonju Film Festival in South Korea, which owns the copyright, but was rejected.

Director Ying Liang was interviewed by Lei Ting 881 and stated in a Facebook statement that the Chinese government had proposed to purchase the copyright and tried to prevent the film from being broadcast. He was also interviewed by personnel from the Shanghai Municipal Government's External Liaison Office, who said that the film was inconsistent with the facts. He said that the public security, national security and national security had visited his family many times. Liang stated that if the government believes the film is inconsistent with the facts, he hoped that the government would disclose the official truth.

As for the Chinese government's claim that it offered 50 million yuan to purchase the film's copyright, Liang cited Ji-Hoon Jo's statement on Facebook to clarify that the Chinese government did offer to purchase it, but did not offer a price. The chairman of the Jeonju Film Festival did say at the opening ceremony "the Chinese government offered us 10,000,000,000 won to buy the film".

== See also ==
- List of TV and films with critiques of Chinese Communist Party
