= Taking Father Home =

- Film poster
- Traditional Chinese: 背鴨子的男孩
- Simplified Chinese: 背鸭子的男孩
- Hanyu Pinyin: bēi yāzi de nánhái
- Directed by: Ying Liang
- Written by: Ying Liang; Peng Shan
- Produced by: Peng Shan
- Starring: Xu Yun; Liu Xiaopei; Wang Jie; Song Cijun
- Cinematography: Li Rongsheng; Ying Liang
- Edited by: Ying Liang
- Music by: Zhang Xiao
- Distributed by: Tidepoint Pictures
- Release date: February 4, 2006 (International Film Festival Rotterdam)
- Running time: 100 minutes
- Country: China
- Language: Mandarin

Taking Father Home (Chinese: 背鸭子的男孩) is an independent Chinese film. It is the first feature from Chinese director Ying Liang. The entire movie was shot with a borrowed camera. The Chinese title directly translates as "the duck-carrying boy," which is a motif recurring throughout the film.

== Plot ==
The film opens with a shot of Xu Yun, shirtless, speaking to his mother. Their village in Sichuan province is about to be relocated to make room for a government industrial zone, and Xu Yun declares that he will search for his father, who has been gone for six years, in the city of Zigong. He has no money, so he carries a basket with two ducks to sell in the city. He brings along a large knife inscribed with his father's name.

On the bus to Zigong, Xu Yun meets a scar-faced older man who catches a pickpocket to earn a reward, and tells Xu Yun that the shameless are afraid of the desperate. He shows him how to eat watermelon "like a man" and advises him not to let himself be bullied. The older man helps Xu Yun find a place to stay, but as soon as he leaves, Xu Yun is kicked out and sent to the police station.

He is released, but left homeless on the street. One of the police officers finds him and offers to let him stay for the night. The officer tries to get him to return to his village the next morning, but Xu Yun resists. On a radio broadcast, he hears that the scar-faced man from earlier is wanted for a murder.

Xu Yun and the officer continue the search for Xu Yun's father, which turns out to be a wild goose chase. Taking a break from the search, the officer takes him to a scenic place along the river, and while Xu Yun goes swimming, the officer is attacked by a gang. In the hospital, Xu Yun overhears a woman talking to his father on the phone. He follows her home as a flood warning rings across the city, instructing residents to evacuate. Instead of meeting his father, he kicks the door and runs away. As he walks back to the hospital, he sees the scar-faced man get beaten by a gang and taken away in a van. When he gets back to the hospital to check on the officer, he is told that the building has been evacuated.

With the loss of both father figures that helped him survive in the city, Xu Yun returns to the river and sets the ducks free.

He returns to his father's house and his stepmother tells him where to find his father. When Xu Yun gets there, his father is being attacked by creditors, and Xu Yun fends them off with his knife. His father doesn't recognize him, and Xu Yun only introduces himself as a villager to ask him to return to the village. The father adamantly refuses, but invites Xu Yun into his shack for a cigar. When we next see him, Xu Yun is covered in blood and his father is dead. He tosses the knife away, the last of his possessions.

The movie switches to black & white to show footage of flood waters filling the city, which likely wash away any trace of the murder. On the bus back to the village, Xu Yun catches a pickpocket and earns a reward, closely mirroring the earlier scene where the scar-faced man did the same. His confidence and bravery contrasts greatly from earlier scenes in the movie. He returns to his village and buries a lock of his father's hair along with some money, which represents everything that he brought back from the city. He has symbolically fulfilled his mission to return his father to the village. The camera transitions back to color while focusing on his bloody hand.

== Awards ==
- SKYY Prize for First Feature at the San Francisco International Film Festival
- Golden Digital Award at the Hong Kong International Film Festival
- Fipresci Prize Award at the Singapore International Film Festival
- Netpac Award at the Singapore International Film Festival
- Special Jury Prize at the Tokyo Filmex Film Festival
