= Jicun, Hebei =

Jicun 姬村镇
- Town
- Location in Hebei
- Coordinates: 37°52′13″N 114°23′52″E
- Country: People's Republic of China
- Province: Hebei
- Prefecture-level city: Shijiazhuang
- County: Yuanshi
- Village-level divisions: 14 villages
- Elevation: 109 m (358 ft)
- Time zone: UTC+8 (China Standard)
- Area code: 0311

Jicun (Chinese: 姬村; pinyin: Jīcūn) is a town of Yuanshi County in southwestern Hebei province, China, located 16 kilometres (9.9 mi) northwest of the county seat. As of 2011, it has 14 villages under its administration.

== See also ==
- List of township-level divisions of Hebei
