= Zhaotong Township =

Coordinates: 37°45′44″N 114°27′42″E

Zhaotong Township 赵同乡
- Township

Chinese transcription(s)
- Interactive map of Zhaotong Township
- Country: China
- Province: Hebei
- Prefecture: Shijiazhuang
- County: Yuanshi County
- Time zone: UTC+8 (China Standard Time)

Zhaotong Township (Chinese: 赵同乡) is a township-level division of Yuanshi County, Shijiazhuang, Hebei, China.

== See also ==
- List of township-level divisions of Hebei
