= Dongzhang Township =

Dongzhang Township 东张乡
- Township
- Location in Hebei
- Coordinates: 37°42′30″N 114°32′49″E
- Country: People's Republic of China
- Province: Hebei
- Prefecture-level city: Shijiazhuang
- County: Yuanshi
- Village-level divisions: 15 villages
- Elevation: 63 m (207 ft)
- Time zone: UTC+8 (China Standard)
- Area code: 0311

Dongzhang Township (simplified Chinese: 东张乡; traditional Chinese: 東張鄉; pinyin: Dōngzhāng Xiāng) is a township of Yuanshi County in southwestern Hebei province, China, located about 5 kilometres (3.1 mi) south-southeast of the county seat, 35 km (22 mi) due south of Shijiazhuang, and located to the west of China National Highway 107. As of 2011, it has 15 villages under its administration.

== See also ==
- List of township-level divisions of Hebei
