= Nanzuo =

Coordinates: 37°50′13″N 114°21′33″E

Nanzuo 南佐镇
- Town

Chinese transcription(s)
- Interactive map of Nanzuo
- Country: China
- Province: Hebei
- Prefecture: Shijiazhuang
- County: Yuanshi County
- Time zone: UTC+8 (China Standard Time)

Nanzuo (Chinese: 南佐镇) is a township-level division of Yuanshi County, Shijiazhuang, Hebei, China.

== See also ==
- List of township-level divisions of Hebei
