= Puisi Tak Terkuburkan =

- Screen capture of Ibrahim Kadir
- Directed by: Garin Nugroho
- Written by: Nana Mulyana
- Starring: Ibrahim Kadir
- Release date: 2000
- Running time: 83 – 90 minutes
- Country: Indonesia
- Language: Indonesian

Puisi Tak Terkuburkan (literally Unburied Poetry; released in English as A Poet: Unconcealed Poetry) is a 2000 award-winning Indonesian documentary/drama directed by Garin Nugroho in black and white. At the 2001 Singapore International Film Festival the film won the FIPRESCI Prize and the Silver Screen Award for Best Asian Actor which went to the poet Ibrahim Kadir, who played himself. The film was also nominated at for the Silver Screen Award for Best Asian Feature Film, while Nugroho won the Silver Leopard Video Award at the Locarno International Film Festival.

== Plot ==
In 1965, Ibrahim Kadir (played by himself) is falsely arrested after being accused of being a communist or communist sympathizer. While imprisoned, he meets other inmates who have also been falsely imprisoned. Together, they sing the traditional poetic form didong, and attempt to band together. However, every day more prisoners are taken outside and executed.

While alone, Kadir thinks of the crimes committed by the military that he has witnessed, including the killings of unarmed women and children, as well as the execution of the wrongfully incarcerated. He continues to hear the voices of the past as the number of prisoners dwindles done to a few; he is eventually released after spending 22 days in prison.

== Production ==
According to the film's director Garin Nugroho, he wrote Puisi Tak Terkuburkan to "reinterpret the wounds of history" after being offered Rp 60 million (US$7,000) to write a script after finishing Daun di Atas Bantal. At the time, he intended to make three films: one regarding Aceh, one regarding Papua, and one about the youth movement, choosing areas of potential conflict.

Anne Rutherford, a senior lecturer on cinema studies at the University of Western Sydney, notes that Puisi Tak Terkuburkan was the first Indonesian movie to discuss the 1965–1966 communist purge. It was produced during a "wave" of Indonesian films criticizing former president Suharto's New Order regime. Such films were not allowed during the New Order, and Nugroho reported that his family feared he would be killed.

Puisi Tak Terkuburkan was shot in a digital video format, with shooting beginning in August 1999.

== Style ==
The movie is set entirely within two prison cells and a guards' room. Nugroho uses close shots which, according to Rutherford, amplify the claustrophobia of the setting. The film is shot entirely in black and white. She describes the sound as being fluent and mobile, contrasting the claustrophobia of the shots. Nugroho himself considered the visuals secondary to the dialog.

The perpetrators of the communist purges are not shown on screen. According to Rutherford, this leaves the audience wondering "what has gone wrong?".

== Themes ==
The Gayo poetic form didong, contrasting two or more voices, is prominent throughout the film. During and following the communist purges, didong was used as a way to reinforce that revolutions would bring death to the perpetrators.

== Release and reception ==
Puisi Tak Terkuburkan was released in 2000. Nugroho said that it was not meant to be commercial, and that he only planned to show it for several days at higher-class theatres before selling it to local television stations.

It was screened at the Sydney Asia Pacific Film Festival in 2001. In February 2005, Nugroho showed the film to raise money to help the Acehnese survivors of the 2004 Indian Ocean earthquake and tsunami.

== Awards ==
Puisi Tak Terkuburkan received the Silver Leopard award at the 2000 Locarno International Film Festival. Kadir won Best Actor at Cinefan film festival in India in 2001; that same year, he received best actor at the Singapore International Film Festival, with the film winning a jury prize for best film.

== Notes ==
1. Original: "... menafsirkan kembali luka-luka sejarah."
