= Chengqu Subdistrict, Yuanshi County =

Chengqu Subdistrict 城区街道
- Subdistrict
- Location in Hebei
- Coordinates: 37°45′21″N 114°32′11″E
- Country: People's Republic of China
- Province: Hebei
- Prefecture-level city: Shijiazhuang
- County: Yuanshi
- Village-level divisions: 4 residential communities 2 villages
- Elevation: 65 m (213 ft)
- Time zone: UTC+8 (China Standard)
- Postal code: 051130
- Area code: 0311

Chengqu Subdistrict (simplified Chinese: 城区街道; traditional Chinese: 城區街道; pinyin: Chéngqū Jiēdào; lit. 'city district') is a subdistrict and the seat of Yuanshi County, Hebei province, China. As of 2011, it has 4 residential communities (社区) under its administration.

== See also ==
- List of township-level divisions of Hebei
