= Ying Liang =

Chinese film director (born 1977)

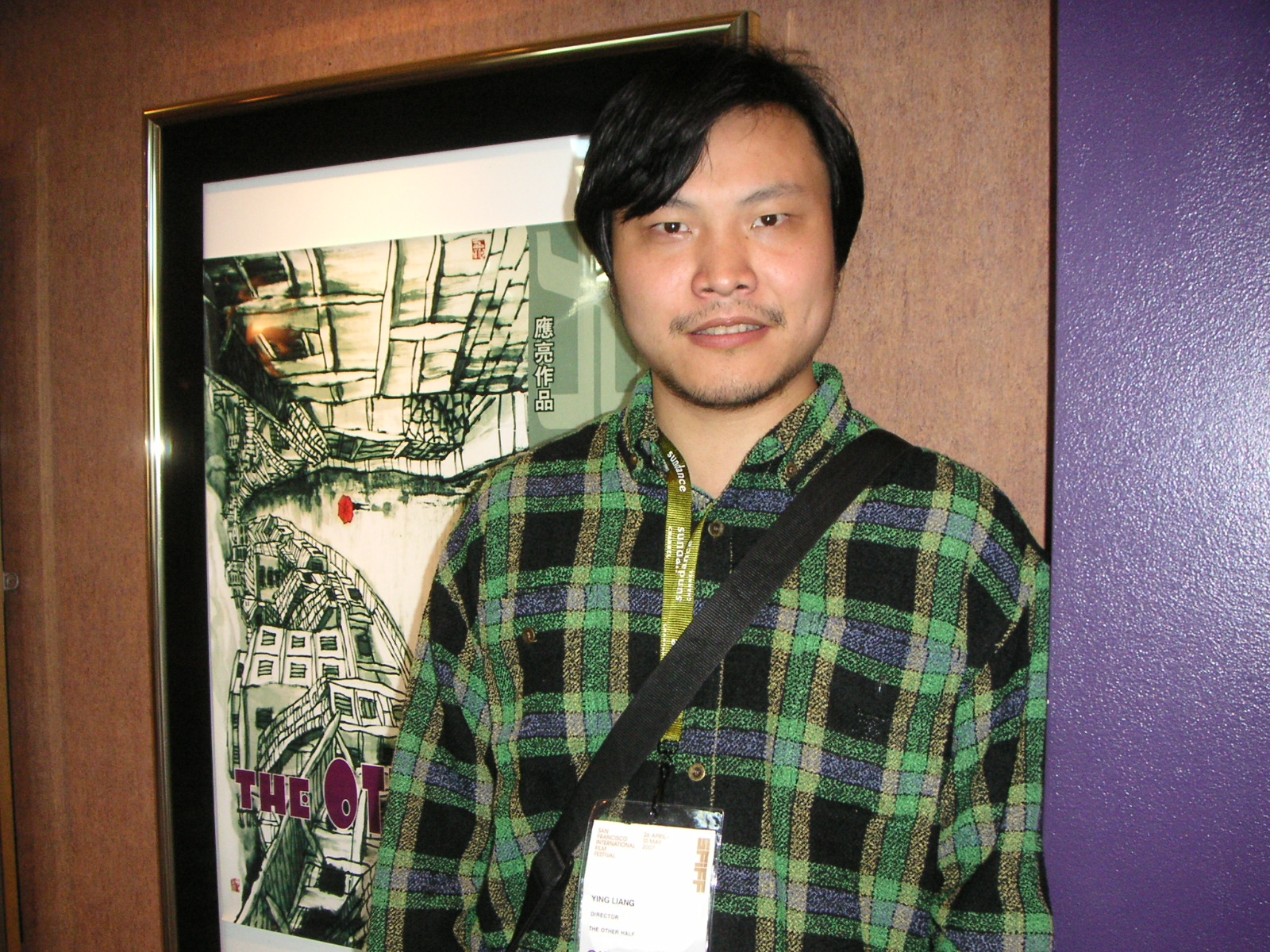
- Ying Liang at the San Francisco International Film Festival
- Born: 1977 (age 48–49); Shanghai, China
- Occupations: Director, Screenwriter
- Years active: 2000s–present

Chinese name
- Traditional Chinese: 應亮
- Simplified Chinese: 应亮
Transcriptions
Standard Mandarin
- Hanyu Pinyin: Yīng Liàng

Ying Liang (Chinese: 应亮; pinyin: yīng liàng; born 1977) is a Chinese independent film director and screenwriter.

== Biography ==
Ying Liang graduated from the Department of Directing at the Chongqing Film Academy and Beijing Normal University. His short film The Missing House (2003) won the best script award at the Beijing Student Film Festival, and Critics Award at the Hong Kong Independent Short Film Festival.

After the success of his short films, he directed his first feature film Taking Father Home (2005), which won awards at the Tokyo Filmex Film Festival, the Hong Kong International Film Festival, and the San Francisco International Film Festival. Taking Father Home was also selected at more than 30 international film festivals including those taking place in Rotterdam, Vancouver, London, Chicago, and Fribourg.

In 2006, Ying made The Other Half, which is supported by the Hubert Bals Fund (HBF) from the International Film Festival Rotterdam. The film also won the Special Jury Prize at the Tokyo Filmex Film Festival.

In 2012, When Night Falls earned him the Best Director award and Nai An won the Best Actress award at the Locarno Film Festival. In 2018, he released his autobiographical feature film A Family Tour, which debuted at the International Competition section of the Locarno Film Festival, was screened at the 56th New York Film Festival, and was the closing film at the 18th Kaohsiung Film Festival.

He was one of the part-time lecturers of Film/TV School, Hong Kong Academy for Performing Arts and Hong Kong Baptist University. He also was one of the part-time researchers at Hong Kong Baptist University, programming for the Chinese Documentary Film Festival (Hong Kong), and one of the founders of the Chinese Independent Documentary Lab (Hong Kong).

== Filmography ==
=== As director ===
Year	English title	Chinese title	Notes
2005	Taking Father Home	背鸭子的男孩	
2006	The Other Half	另一半	
2008	Good Cats	好猫	
2009	Condolences		Short film
2012	When Night Falls		
2016	A Sunny Day		Short film
2017	I Have Nothing to Say		Short film
2018	A Family Tour	自由行	

== Awards ==
- Woosuk Award at the Jeonju International Film Festival for The Other Half 2007
- Special Jury Award at the Singapore International Film Festival for The Other Half 2007
- The Special Jury Prize Kodak VISION Award at Tokyo Filmex Film Festival for The Other Half 2006
- SKYY Prize for First Feature at the San Francisco International Film Festival for Taking Father Home 2006
- Golden Digital Award at the Hong Kong International Film Festival for Taking Father Home 2006
- FIPRESCI Prize at the Singapore International Film Festival for Taking Father Home 2006
- Special Mention NETPAC Award at the Singapore International Film Festival for Taking Father Home 2006
- Special Jury Prize at the Tokyo Filmex Film Festival for Taking Father Home 2005
- Best Live Action Short Film at the Golden Horse Film Festival and Awards for A Sunny Day《九月二十八日·晴》 2016
- NETPAC Award at the Vesoul International Film Festival of Asian Cinema for A Family Tour 2019
