= Yuanshi County =

Place in Hebei, China

Yuanshi County 元氏县 Yuanshih
- County
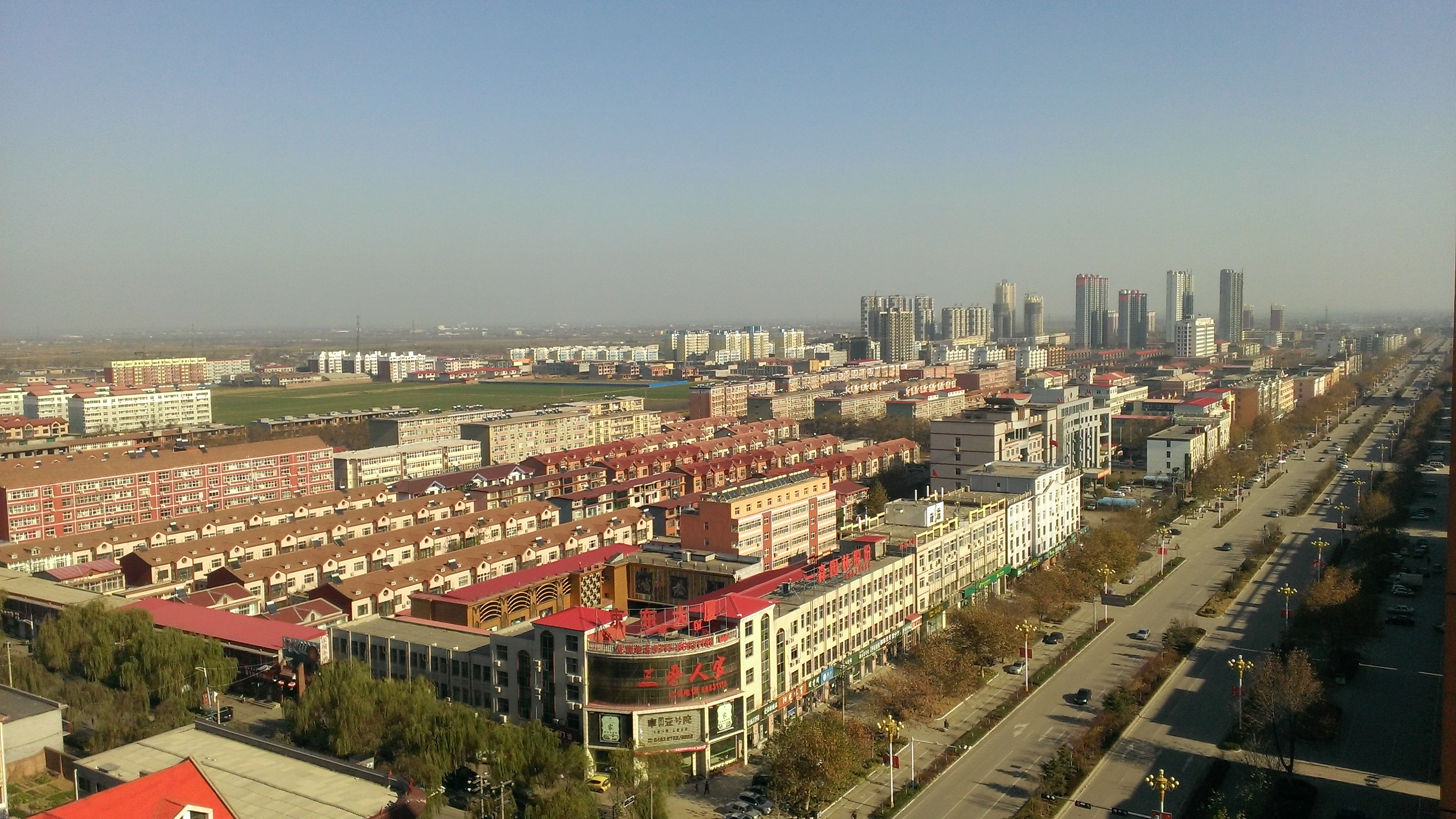
- Yuanshi skyline

- Location in Hebei
- Coordinates: 37°46′00″N 114°31′32″E
- Country: People's Republic of China
- Province: Hebei
- Prefecture-level city: Shijiazhuang

Area
  - Total: 676 km^{2} (261 sq mi)

Population (2020)
  - Total: 392,710
  - Density: 581/km^{2} (1,500/sq mi)
- Time zone: UTC+8 (China Standard)

Yuanshi County (simplified Chinese: 元氏县; traditional Chinese: 元氏縣; pinyin: Yuánshì Xiàn; lit. 'Yuan's County') is located in the southwest of Hebei Province, North China, 40 kilometres (25 mi) to the south of Shijiazhuang, the provincial capital. Yuanshi County borders Gaoyi County to the south, Zhao County and Luancheng District to the east, Jingxing County to the west and Luquan District to its north. It is known as the birthplace of Emperor Ming of Han and Li Mu.

== Geography ==
The total area of the county is 676 km^{2} (261 sq mi). The region is dominated by hills and valleys, with flat plains at the base of the Taihang Mountains. The area has a semi-arid climate, marked by continental monsoons and droughts during the spring.

== History ==
Human settlement can be traced back to the Neolithic era, having been used as farmland for the villages of Beibailou and Xizheng in neighbouring Li and Zhao County. According to ancient bronze inscriptions, during the Western Zhou, the area that is now Yuanshi and Gaoyi County contained the small Chedi state, which agreed to be absorbed into the Xing vassal state to defend itself against northern nomads.

During the Eastern Zhou, under King Weilie, the land belonged to the Zhongshan state as Feilongyi or Fenglongyi, but was later ceded to King Wuling of the Zhao state in 305 BCE, splitting the area into four towns. Under King Huiwen, some of the land was given to a Prince Yuan, who became the namesake of the county. The county is mentioned by this name in the Shiji, recording the construction of a wall in 255 BCE. Yuanshi became a county during the Western Han under Emperor Gaozu and made part of Hengshan Prefecture, with Gucheng village as the county and prefecture seat. With the establishment of the Changshan Commandery, Yuanshi was made the capital of the commandery until the Western Jin Dynasty, when it was replaced by Zhengding.

In 619, Yuanshi was the site of the capture of Liu Heita, a general under Dou Jiande.

In 2010, Yuanshi County was named a Millennium Ancient County, as the first county under Shijiazhuang jurisdiction to hold this title, after a UNESCO panel dated the founding of Yuanshi to 586 at the latest, under consideration of several short-lived merges in the centuries before.

Yuanshi County is known for its agricultural tourism, attracting a few thousand tourists during harvest seasons.

== Culture ==
Fenglong Academy was founded during the Eastern Han and became known as one of the "four great academies north of the Yangtze" during the Song and Yuan dynasties. Mathematician Li Ye studied tian yuan shu at the academy and later served as its headmaster. It is compared to Tsinghua University in prestige during Li's tenure.

A significant portion of ruins of the Changshan Prefecture, designated a Major Historical and Cultural Site Protected at the National Level are located in the county. Yuanshi has four national priority protected relics, two ding, one gui, and one you, designated national first-class. The relics are kept at the municipal and provincial museums. Yuanshi originally only had one relic with the national first-class designation until the seventh batch release announcement in 2013.

Local customs include the Leleqiang opera (乐乐腔) in Longzheng village, where the plays are passed down only through oral tradition within the founding Li family since the Qing dynasty, and the Carrying of the Flower Pole (抬花杠), a dancing ceremony originating from Dongzheng village in the late Sui and early Tang dynasty, but practised in several settlements under Dongzhang Township.

The Wuji Mountain Ski Resort, the largest ski resort in Shijiazhuang, is located in Sucun Township.

== Administrative divisions ==
Subdistricts:

- Chengqu Subdistrict (城区街道)

Towns:

- Huaiyang (槐阳镇), Nanyin (南因镇), Nanzuo (南佐镇), Yincun (殷村镇), Jicun (姬村镇), Songcao (宋曹镇)

Townships:

- Dongzhang Township (东张乡), Zhaotong Township (赵同乡), Macun Township (马村乡), Beichu Township (北褚乡), Suyang Township (苏阳乡), Sucun Township (苏村乡), Beizheng Township (北正乡), Qianxian Township (前仙乡), Heishuihe Township (黑水河乡)

== Demographics ==
On 1 November 2020, the population was 392,710. Of these, 204,394 (52.05%) lived in rural areas while 188,316 (47.95%) lived in urban areas. The sex distribution was 203,430 (51.8%) for males and 189,280 (48.2%) for females. The proportion of those aged 14 and under was 82,392 (20.98%) and of those aged 60 and over was 75,087 (19.12%).

As of 2020, the most populous area is Chengqu Subdistrict with 75,682 residents. The least populous area is Qianxian Township with 6,505 residents.

Compared to the 2010 census of 418,466, overall population shrunk by 6.15%. Both the child and elderly population increased while distribution shifted towards urban areas, which experienced a 23.9% growth.

== Climate ==
Climate data for Yuanshi, elevation 68 m (223 ft), (1991–2020 normals, extremes 1981–2010)
| Month | Jan | Feb | Mar | Apr | May | Jun | Jul | Aug | Sep | Oct | Nov | Dec | Year |
|---|---|---|---|---|---|---|---|---|---|---|---|---|---|
| Record high °C (°F) | 18.7 (65.7) | 25.7 (78.3) | 31.9 (89.4) | 33.3 (91.9) | 39.8 (103.6) | 42.0 (107.6) | 42.3 (108.1) | 39.7 (103.5) | 37.0 (98.6) | 33.8 (92.8) | 27.1 (80.8) | 24.2 (75.6) | 42.3 (108.1) |
| Mean daily maximum °C (°F) | 3.0 (37.4) | 7.3 (45.1) | 15.0 (59.0) | 21.2 (70.2) | 27.0 (80.6) | 32.5 (90.5) | 32.3 (90.1) | 30.2 (86.4) | 26.8 (80.2) | 20.6 (69.1) | 11.5 (52.7) | 4.8 (40.6) | 19.4 (66.8) |
| Daily mean °C (°F) | −3.0 (26.6) | 0.9 (33.6) | 8.2 (46.8) | 14.7 (58.5) | 20.8 (69.4) | 26.0 (78.8) | 27.1 (80.8) | 25.3 (77.5) | 20.6 (69.1) | 14.3 (57.7) | 5.5 (41.9) | −1.0 (30.2) | 13.3 (55.9) |
| Mean daily minimum °C (°F) | −7.8 (18.0) | −4.3 (24.3) | 1.7 (35.1) | 8.2 (46.8) | 14.1 (57.4) | 19.4 (66.9) | 22.5 (72.5) | 20.9 (69.6) | 15.3 (59.5) | 8.9 (48.0) | 0.8 (33.4) | −5.5 (22.1) | 7.8 (46.1) |
| Record low °C (°F) | −20.7 (−5.3) | −19.0 (−2.2) | −9.1 (15.6) | −1.7 (28.9) | 4.4 (39.9) | 10.2 (50.4) | 15.9 (60.6) | 12.5 (54.5) | 4.9 (40.8) | −3.2 (26.2) | −14.7 (5.5) | −23.2 (−9.8) | −23.2 (−9.8) |
| Average precipitation mm (inches) | 2.0 (0.08) | 4.8 (0.19) | 9.9 (0.39) | 25.0 (0.98) | 37.4 (1.47) | 60.5 (2.38) | 130.0 (5.12) | 139.4 (5.49) | 51.8 (2.04) | 25.4 (1.00) | 14.6 (0.57) | 2.9 (0.11) | 503.7 (19.82) |
| Average precipitation days (≥ 0.1 mm) | 1.7 | 2.7 | 2.6 | 5.1 | 6.6 | 8.3 | 11.1 | 10.4 | 6.9 | 5.7 | 3.9 | 2.0 | 67 |
| Average snowy days | 2.6 | 2.7 | 1.0 | 0.2 | 0 | 0 | 0 | 0 | 0 | 0 | 1.4 | 2.4 | 10.3 |
| Average relative humidity (%) | 60 | 56 | 53 | 60 | 62 | 60 | 75 | 80 | 75 | 67 | 68 | 64 | 65 |
| Mean monthly sunshine hours | 139.2 | 150.9 | 200.4 | 229.4 | 257.9 | 219.2 | 177.1 | 178.0 | 176.1 | 170.0 | 147.6 | 137.9 | 2,183.7 |
| Percentage possible sunshine | 45 | 49 | 54 | 58 | 59 | 50 | 40 | 43 | 48 | 50 | 49 | 47 | 49 |
Source: China Meteorological Administration

== Notable people ==
- Li Mu (died 229 BCE), Zhao general
- Li Zuoche (fl. 200 BCE) Qin dynasty strategist
- Emperor Ming of Han (28–75), second Emperor of the eastern Han dynasty
- Wei Lun, Ming dynasty official and jinshi degree holder
- Niu Shu (died 1663), Qing dynasty official and jinshi degree holder
