= 32nd Singapore International Film Festival =

2021 film festival

- Opening film: Vengeance Is Mine, All Others Pay Cash by Edwin
- Location: Singapore
- Festival date: 25 November–5 December 2021
- Website: sgiff.com

Singapore International Film Festival
- 33rd 31st

The 32nd annual Singapore International Film Festival took place from 25 November to 5 December 2021 in Singapore. The festival returned to cinema-only events after an online edition a year prior, due to COVID-19 pandemic. Five new sections were introduced during the festival: Foreground, Milestone, Standpoint, Undercurrent, and Domain. Edwin's Vengeance Is Mine, All Others Pay Cash served as the opening film of the festival.

Road comedy film Hit the Road won the festival's main award Silver Screen Award for Best Asian Film.

== Official selection ==
=== Opening film ===
English title	Original title	Director(s)	Production countrie(s)
Vengeance Is Mine, All Others Pay Cash	Seperti Dendam, Rindu Harus Dibayar Tuntas	Edwin	Indonesia, Singapore, Germany

=== Asian Feature Film Competition ===
English title	Original title	Director(s)	Production countrie(s)
Amira		Mohamed Diab	Egypt, Jordan, United Arab Emirates, Saudi Arabia
Anatomy of Time	เวลา	Jakrawal Nilthamrong	Thailand, France, Netherlands, Singapore
Fire	Ot	Aizhan Kassymbek	Kazakhstan
Hit the Road	جاده خاکی	Panah Panahi	Iran
A New Old Play	椒麻堂會	Qiu Jiongjiong	Hong Kong, France
Pebbles	கூழாங்கல்	PS Vinothraj	India
Rehana Maryam Noor	রেহানা মরিয়ম নূর	Abdullah Mohammad Saad	Bangladesh, Singapore, Qatar
Whether the Weather Is Fine	Kun Maupay Man It Panahon	Carlo Francisco Manatad	Philippines, France, Singapore, Indonesia, Germany, Qatar
White Building	ប៊ូឌីញ ស	Kavich Neang	Cambodia, France, China, Qatar
Yuni		Kamila Andini	Indonesia, Singapore, France, Australia

=== Singapore Panorama ===
English title	Original title	Director(s)	Production countrie(s)
24		Royston Tan	Singapore, Thailand
Mat Magic (1971)		Mat Sentol, John Calvert	Singapore
Scene Unseen		Abdul Nizam Abdul Hamid	Singapore

=== Milestone ===
English title	Original title	Director(s)	Production countrie(s)
Barbarian Invasion	野蛮人入侵	Tan Chui Mui	Malaysia, Hong Kong
Center Stage (1991)	阮玲玉	Stanley Kwan	Hong Kong
Happening	L'Événement	Audrey Diwan	France
Karmalink		Jake Wachtel	Cambodia, United States
Memoria		Apichatpong Weerasethakul	Colombia, Thailand, United Kingdom, Mexico, France, Germany, Qatar
Those Left Waiting		Michael Beets	Australia

=== Foreground ===
English title	Original title	Director(s)	Production countrie(s)
The Dog Who Wouldn't Be Quiet	El perro que no calla	Ana Katz	Argentina
The French Dispatch		Wes Anderson	United States
Great Freedom	Große Freiheit	Sebastian Meise	Austria, Germany
A Hero	قهرمان	Asghar Farhadi	Iran, France
History of Ha	Historya ni Ha	Lav Diaz	Philippines
I'm Your Man	Ich bin dein Mensch	Maria Schrader	Germany
In Front of Your Face	당신 얼굴 앞에서	Hong Sang-soo	South Korea
Inu-Oh	犬王	Masaaki Yuasa	Japan, China
Moon, 66 Questions	Selini, 66 erotiseis	Jacqueline Lentzou	Greece, France
Onoda: 10,000 Nights in the Jungle		Arthur Harari	France, Japan, Germany, Belgium, Italy, Cambodia
Petite Maman		Céline Sciamma	France
The Sacred Spirit	Espíritu sagrado	Chema García Ibarra	Spain, France, Turkey
Saloum		Jean Luc Herbulot	Senegal
Yanagawa	漫长的告白	Zhang Lü	China

=== Standpoint ===
English title	Original title	Director(s)	Production countrie(s)
Children of the Enemy		Gorki Glaser-Müller	Sweden, Denmark
The Flame	Bara	Arfan Sabran	Indonesia, Qatar
Mr. Bachmann and His Class	Herr Bachmann und seine Klasse	Maria Speth	Germany
My Sunny Maad	Moje slunce Mad	Michaela Pavlátová	Czech Republic, France, Slovakia
On the Other Side	Del otro lado	Iván Guarnizo	Colombia, Spain
Some Women		Quen Wong	Singapore
Ushiku	牛久	Thomas Ash	Japan
Worship	บูชา	Uruphong Raksasad	Thailand

=== Undercurrent ===
English title	Original title	Director(s)	Production countrie(s)
The Edge of Daybreak	พญาโศกพิโยคค่ำ	Taiki Sakpisit	Thailand, Switzerland
The Tsugua Diaries	Diários de Otsoga	Miguel Gomes, Maureen Fazendeiro	Portugal

=== Domain ===
English title	Original title	Director(s)	Production countrie(s)
Inside the Red Brick Wall	理大圍城	Hong Kong Documentary Filmmakers	Hong Kong
Nightcleaners (1975)		Berwick Street Film Collective	United Kingdom
Tongpan (1977)	ทองปาน	Isan Film Collective	Thailand
Yama – Attack to Attack (1985)	山谷─やられたらやりかえせ	Mitsuo Sato, Kyochi Yamaoka	Japan

== Awards ==
The following awards were presented at the festival:

Asian Feature Film Competition

- Best Asian Feature Film: Hit the Road by Panah Panahi
- Best Director: PS Vinothraj for Pebbles
- Best Performance: Tolepbergen Baissakalov for Fire

Southeast Asian Short Film

- Best Southeast Asian Short Film: The Men Who Wait by Trương Minh Quý
- Best Singapore Short Film: {if your bait can sing the wild one will come} Like Shadows Through Leaves by Lucy Davis
- Best Director: Mark Chua and Lam Li Shuen for A Man Trembles
- Youth Jury Prize: Grandma's Broken Leg by Huỳnh Công Nhớ
- Special Mention: February 1st by Mo Mo & Leïla Macaire

Audience Choice Award: Some Women by Quen Wong

=== Outstanding Contribution to Southeast Asian Cinema Award ===
- Southeast Asian Fiction Film Lab (SEAFIC)
