= The Adamant Girl =

2024 Indian film

- Theatrical release poster
- Directed by: P. S. Vinothraj
- Screenplay by: P. S. Vinothraj
- Produced by: Sivakarthikeyan; Kalai Arasu
- Starring: Soori; Anna Ben
- Cinematography: B. Sakthivel
- Edited by: Ganesh Siva
- Production companies: Sivakarthikeyan Productions; The Little Wave Productions
- Release dates: 16 February 2024 (Berlinale); 23 August 2024 (India)
- Running time: 100 minutes
- Country: India
- Language: Tamil

Kottukkaali (English: The Adamant Girl) is a 2024 Indian Tamil-language road drama film directed by P. S. Vinothraj and produced by Sivakarthikeyan Productions. The film, which revolves around Meena who loves a man from a lower caste but her family thinks she is possessed and that exorcism is the answer, stars Soori and Anna Ben (in her Tamil debut).

The film was selected in the Forum section at the 74th Berlin International Film Festival and was screened on 16 February 2024. It was released on 23 August 2024 to critical acclaim.

== Plot ==
Paandi, Meena's maternal uncle, returns from abroad after several years, intending to marry her off. However, Meena is resolute in her love for a boy from an oppressed caste, which her family attributes to a spell.

To exorcise this perceived influence, Paandi, accompanied by his parents, relatives, and friends, embarks on a journey to consult a seer. Before meeting the seer, they visit their family deity to perform rituals.

En route, they face various challenges, including a malfunctioning autorickshaw, Karthi's need to use the restroom, and Rani's menstrual cramps. They also witness a puberty ceremony procession, which reminds Paandi of his past efforts, and the infuriated Paandi attacks and beats Meena for humming a song. He lashes out at his relatives, including Meena's mother, Shanti, and father, Murugan, as well as the auto driver, Suresh, and even physically assaults his father. However, he later apologizes to Murugan.

Meanwhile, Siva and Mani, who are following the group, divert to a wine shop, where they discuss Meena's fidelity and speculate that she might be pregnant, which they believe explains her adamant desire to marry the boy she loves. A bull crosses their path, only to be led away by a young girl who claims it as her sole companion. The rooster, destined for sacrifice, tries to escape but fails. Meena has a vision of herself walking freely with untied hair.

Upon arriving at the seer's residence in Palamedu, Paandi observes another girl, similar in age to Meena, being cured of a spell causing her infertility. The seer performs rituals, including stroking the girl's navel, and neck, and blowing air into her mouth, claiming to have removed tiny voodoo balls and freed her from the spell. Unable to bear witness to this, Paandi leaves the premises and, when called, unwillingly returns. The screen fades to black with the message "The end of this journey is in your hands."

== Cast ==
- Soori as Paandi
- Anna Ben as Meena
- Jawahar Sakthi as Kumar, Paandi's friend
- Poobalam Pragatheeswaran as Paandi's father
- Sai Abinaya as Rani, Paandi's sister
- Mullaiyarasi as a girl being treated by the seer

== Production ==
In January 2023, Sivakarthikeyan was announced to fund a new project under Sivakarthikeyan Productions, starring Soori in the lead role with PS Vinothraj directing it in his sophomore film after Pebbles (2021). The following March, the company made a public announcement, confirming the project, and the film's official title, Kottukkaali, was announced the same day. The film is jointly produced by Sivakarthikeyan Productions and The Little Wave Productions. The cinematography is handled by B Sakthivel, and editing by Ganesh Siva. Filming was completed in May 2023.

== Release ==
=== Theatrical ===
The Adamant Girl had its world premiere on 16 February 2024, at the 74th Berlin International Film Festival. The film was presented in the Forum section of the festival. The film was theatrically released on 23 August 2024. It also made it to the Alchemies section of the 69th Valladolid International Film Festival and screened on 21 October. The film was selected to compete in the Southeast Asian Premiere section of the 35th Singapore International Film Festival and was screened on 7 December 2024.

=== Home media ===
The film was premiered on Amazon Prime Video from 27 September 2024.

== Reception ==
Praising the direction and the performances of the lead actors, Latha Srinivasan of Hindustan Times wrote,"PS Vinothraj is a master storyteller, who has supreme control over his craft and the characters he presents to us on screen. [...] Caste plays a key role here as well as regressive beliefs that keep women in check. Unfortunately, the women also perpetuate these regressive beliefs because they don’t know any better or anything different. We see how the men think they are all-knowing and can’t get a simple thing done, like deal with the fly, and how the women are smarter by comparison."

Gopinath Rajendran in his review for The Hindu wrote, "Apart from an intriguing plot accented by a terrific supporting cast, it is Anna Ben and Soori’s career-best performances that elevate Kottukkaali into one of this year’s best films. [...] Without being pompous about its themes, Kottukkaali excels at showcasing a day in the life of a dysfunctional family doused with patriarchal norms. While the open-ended climax might feel divisive, it also opens a realm of possible outcomes that the filmmaker generously lets us pick one from. In an industry where directors suffer from the sophomore curse, Vinothraj delivers a more well-rounded second film, and proves that he's here to stay... and win." Sudhir Srinivasan of Cinema Express wrote,"This film is even without that most obvious tool of manipulation: Music. I loved the film for employing no music. In this film about the torment of Meena, music would have felt exploitative. It would have been an obvious directorial ploy to have you react one way or another, but in its present form, Kottukkaali simply takes your hand and walks you around for a few hours with the family of Pandi and Meena—without telling you how you ought to feel."

Bharathy Singaravel of The News Minute gave a positive review writing,"Apart from a few small hiccups, Kottukkaali takes audiences on a winding ride across the arid fields and dusty highways of Madurai towards another more pressing destination: introspection regarding words like ‘culture’ or ‘community’ and what they mean apart from power." Writing for India Today,Janani K rated the film 4/5 mentioning,"Kottukkaali is easily the film of the year and director PS Vinothraj is slowly turning out to be a filmmaker you cannot ignore." However the movie did not score well with general audience with some calling it the worst movie of the year.

Sajesh Mohan of Onmanorama in his Cinema Analysis column, Cinemascape, wrote: Anna Ben's portrayal of Meena stands out, capturing the character's resilience and emotional depth. Moments of silent defiance, such as her contemplative gaze at a rooster symbolizing her lover's plight, powerfully underscore the film’s themes of love, honor, and societal hypocrisy.

== Accolades ==
Award	Date of ceremony	Category	Recipient(s)	Result	Ref.
Singapore International Film Festival	8 December 2024	Special Mention for Best Performance: Ensemble cast and the nature	The Adamant Girl	Won	
Filmfare Awards South	2024	Best Actress - Tamil	Anna Ben	Nominated	
Filmfare Awards South	2024	Critics Best Actress – Tamil	Anna Ben	Won	
