= 30th Singapore International Film Festival =

2019 film festival

- Opening film: Wet Season by Anthony Chen
- Closing film: The Truth by Hirokazu Kore-eda
- Location: Singapore
- Festival date: 21 November–1 December 2019
- Website: sgiff.com

Singapore International Film Festival
- 31st 29th

The 30th annual Singapore International Film Festival took place from 21 November to 1 December 2019 in Singapore. The festival opened with Anthony Chen's drama film Wet Season and closed with Hirokazu Kore-eda's drama film The Truth.

Mystery drama film Scales won the festival's main award Silver Screen Award for Best Asian Film.

== Official selection ==
=== Opening and closing films ===
English title	Original title	Director(s)	Production countrie(s)
Wet Season (opening film)	热带雨	Anthony Chen	Singapore, Taiwan
The Truth (closing film)	La Vérité	Hirokazu Kore-eda	France, Japan

=== In competition ===
English title	Original title	Director(s)	Production countrie(s)
Africa		Oren Gerner	
Bombay Rose		Gitanjali Rao	India, France, United Kingdom, Qatar
Dwelling in the Fuchun Mountains	春江水暖	Gu Xiaogang	China
The Kamagasaki Cauldron War	月夜釜合戦	Leo Sato	Japan
Passed by Censor	Görülmüştür	Serhat Karaaslan	Turkey, Germany, France
Scales	سيدة البحر	Shahad Ameen	United Arab Emirates, Iraq, Saudi Arabia
The Science of Fictions	Hiruk-Pikuk Si Al-Kisah	Yosep Anggi Noen	Indonesia, Malaysia, France
The Tree House	Nhà Cây	Minh Quý Trương	Vietnam, Singapore, Germany, France, China
Verdict		Raymund Ribay Gutierrez	Philippines

=== Special Presentations ===
English title	Original title	Director(s)	Production countrie(s)
Downton Abbey		Michael Engler	United Kingdom
Nina Wu	灼人秘密	Midi Z	Taiwan, Malaysia, Myanmar

=== Singapore Panorama ===
English title	Original title	Director(s)	Production countrie(s)
Accept the Call		Eunice Lau	Singapore, United States
I Dream of Singapore		Lei Yuan Bin	Singapore
Revolution Launderette	信念のメリーゴーランド	Mark Chua, Lam Li Shuen	Singapore, Japan
Unteachable		Yong Shu Ling	Singapore
Series
Invisible Stories (episodes 1–2)		Ler Jiyuan	Singapore

=== Asian Vision ===
English title	Original title	Director(s)	Production countrie(s)
Balloon	气球	Pema Tseden	China
Breathless Animals	动物方言	Lei Lei	United States
Coming Home Again		Wayne Wang	United States, South Korea
A Girl Missing	よこがお	Koji Fukada	Japan, France
Krabi, 2562		Ben Rivers, Anocha Suwichakornpong	United Kingdom, Thailand
Last Night I Saw You Smiling	យប់មិញបងឃើញអូនញញឹម	Kavich Neang	Cambodia, France
Midnight Traveler		Hassan Fazili	United States, Qatar, United Kingdom, Canada
No.7 Cherry Lane	繼園臺七號	Yonfan	Hong Kong, China
Ride Your Wave	きみと、波にのれたら	Masaaki Yuasa	Japan
Saturday Fiction	兰心大剧院	Lou Ye	China
A Sun	陽光普照	Chung Mong-hong	Taiwan
The Tree Remembers	還有一些樹	Lau Kek-Huat	Taiwan
The Wild Goose Lake	南方车站的聚会	Diao Yinan	China, France

=== Cinema Today ===
English title	Original title	Director(s)	Production countrie(s)
And Then We Danced	და ჩვენ ვიცეკვეთ	Levan Akin	Sweden, Georgia, France
Babyteeth		Shannon Murphy	Australia
Bacurau		Kleber Mendonça Filho, Juliano Dornelles	Brazil, France
Les Misérables		Ladj Ly	France
The Lighthouse		Robert Eggers	United States
Marriage Story		Noah Baumbach	United States
Matthias & Maxime	Matthias et Maxime	Xavier Dolan	Canada
Monos		Alejandro Landes	Colombia, Argentina, Netherlands, Germany, Sweden, Uruguay, United States
Portrait of a Lady on Fire	Portrait de la jeune fille en feu	Céline Sciamma	France
Swallow		Carlo Mirabella-Davis	United States, France
Synonyms	Synonymes	Nadav Lapid	France, Germany
The Two Popes		Fernando Meirelles	United Kingdom, Italy, Argentina, United States
Vitalina Varela		Pedro Costa	Portugal

=== Midnight Mayhem ===
English title	Original title	Director(s)	Production countrie(s)
Deerskin	Le daim	Quentin Dupieux	France
First Love	初恋	Takashi Miike	Japan
Roh		Emir Ezwan	Malaysia
Vivarium		Lorcan Finnegan	Ireland, Belgium, Denmark

=== Focus – Stories We Tell: Myth, Dreamscape, and Memory in Southeast Asian Cinema ===
English title	Original title	Director(s)	Production countrie(s)
LUCKY7 (2008)		Sun Koh, K. Rajagopal, Boo Junfeng, Brian Gothong Tan, Chew Tze Chuan, Ho Tzu Nyen, Tania Sng	Singapore
The Missing Picture (2013)	L'Image manquante	Rithy Panh	Cambodia, France
Mysterious Object at Noon (2000)	ดอกฟ้าในมือมาร	Apichatpong Weerasethakul	Thailand
A Short Film About the Indio Nacional (2005)	Maicling pelicula nañg ysañg Indio Nacional	Raya Martin	Philippines

=== Classics ===
English title	Original title	Director(s)	Production countrie(s)
Flowers of Shanghai (1998)	海上花	Hou Hsiao-hsien	Taiwan, Japan
Memories of Murder (2003)	살인의 추억	Bong Joon-ho	South Korea

== Awards ==
The following awards were presented at the festival:

Asian Film Feature Competition

- Best Film: Scales by Shahad Ameen
- Special Mention: Passed by Censor by Serhat Karaaslan
- Best Director: Oren Gerner for Africa
- Best Performance: Kristoffer King for Verdict

Southeast Asian Short Film Competition

- Best Southeast Asian Short Film: I'm Not Your F***ing Stereotype by Hesome Chemamah
- Special Mention: California Dreaming by Sreylin Meas
- Best Singapore Short Film: Adam by Shoki Lin
- Best Director: Zaw Bo Bo Hein for Sick
- Youth Jury Prize: Sweet, Salty by Duong Dieu Linh

Audience Choice Award: Unteachable by Yong Shu Ling

=== Honorary Award ===
- Takashi Miike'

=== Cinema Icon Award ===
- Yao Chen

=== Inspiring Woman In Film Award ===
- Yeo Yann Yann
