= 29th Singapore International Film Festival =

2018 film festival

- Opening film: Cities of Last Things by Ho Wi-ding
- Location: Singapore
- Festival date: 28 November–9 December 2018
- Website: sgiff.com

Singapore International Film Festival
- 30th 28th

The 29th annual Singapore International Film Festival took place from 28 November to 9 December 2018 in Singapore. The festival opened with Ho Wi-ding's drama film Cities of Last Things.

Cambodian director Rithy Panh was presented with Honorary Award. Actress Joan Chen received the Cinema Legend Award.

== Juries ==
=== Asian Feature Film Competition ===
- Stanley Kwan, Hong Kong film director – Jury Head
- Daniel Dae Kim, American actor
- Akiko Ashizawa, Japanese cinematographer
- Sylvain Corbeil, Canadian film producer
- Trần Nữ Yên Khê, French-Vietnamese actress

=== Southeast Asian Short Film Competition ===
- Maike Mia Höhne, German filmmaker and curator – Jury Head
- Shireen Seno – Filipino filmmaker
- Kirsten Tan – Singaporean filmmaker

== Official selection ==
=== Festival Opening and Special Presentation ===
English title	Original title	Director(s)	Production countrie(s)
Opening film
Cities of Last Things	幸福城市	Ho Wi-ding	Taiwan, China, United States, France
Special Presentations
Dear Ex	谁先爱上他的	Mag Hsu, Hsu Chih-yen	Taiwan
Eerie		Mikhail Red	Philippines, Singapore

=== Asian Feature Film Competition ===
English title	Original title	Director(s)	Production countrie(s)
Bulbul Can Sing		Rima Das	India
The Day I Lost My Shadow	يوم أضعت ظلي	Soudade Kaadan	Syria, Lebanon, France, Qatar
Dayan		Behrouz Nooranipour	Iran
The Future Cries Beneath Our Soils		Pham Thu Hang	Vietnam, Philippines
House of My Fathers	නොමියෙන මතකය	Suba Sivakumaran	Sri Lanka
A Land Imagined	幻土	Yeo Siew Hua	Singapore, France, The Netherlands
Long Day's Journey into Night	地球最后的夜晚	Bi Gan	China, France
The River	Ozen	Emir Baigazin	Kazakhstan, Poland, Norway

=== Southeast Asian Short Film Competition ===
English title	Original title	Director(s)	Production countrie(s)
A Gift	Kado	Aditya Ahmad	Indonesia
A Million Years		Danech San	Cambodia
A Time for Us	萍水相逢	Alvin Lee	Singapore, China
The Ant-Man		Việt Vũ	Vietnam
Bo Hai		Duzan Duong	Vietnam, Czech Republic
Elinah		Ninndi Raras	Indonesia
Gold		Lee Yong Chao	Myanmar
The Imminent Immanent	Baga't Diri Tuhay Ta't Pamahungpahung	Carlo Francisco Manatad	Philippines, Singapore, Italy
Judgement		Raymund Ribay Gutierrez	Philippines
Luzon	海中网	Chiang Wei Liang	Singapore, Taiwan
My Lady M		Tingerine Liu	Singapore, United States
Please Stop Talking	'Wag Mo 'kong Kausapin	Josef Gacutan	Philippines
The Sea Recalls		Aekaphong Saransate	Thailand
Weeping Birds	鸟儿为你来	Chan Teik Quan	Malaysia
With History In A Room Filled With People With Funny Names 4		Korakrit Arunanondchai	Thailand, United States

=== Asian Vision ===
English title	Original title	Director(s)	Production countrie(s)
Asako I & II	寝ても覚めても	Ryusuke Hamaguchi	Japan
Ash Is Purest White	江湖儿女	Jia Zhangke	China, France
The Ashes and Ghosts of Tayug 1931	Dapol Tan Payawar Na Tayug 1931	Christopher Gozum	Philippines
Crossroads: One Two Jaga		Nam Ron	Malaysia
An Elephant Sitting Still	大象席地而坐	Hu Bo	China
A Family Tour	自由行	Ying Liang	Taiwan, Hong Kong, Singapore, Malaysia
First Night Nerves	八个女人一台戏	Stanley Kwan	Hong Kong, China
Graves Without a Name	Les tombeaux sans noms	Rithy Panh	France, Cambodia
Hotel by the River	Gangbyun Hotel	Hong Sang-soo	South Korea
Killing	斬、	Shinya Tsukamoto	Japan
Manta Ray	กระเบนราหู	Phuttiphong Aroonpheng	Thailand, France, China
Memories of My Body	Kucumbu Tubuh Indahku	Garin Nugroho	Indonesia
Nervous Translation		Shireen Seno	Philippines
Of Fathers and Sons		Talal Derki	Germany, Syria, Lebanon
Screwdriver	Mafak	Bassam Jarbawi	Palestine, United States, Qatar
Season of the Devil	Ang Panahon ng Halimaw	Lav Diaz	Philippines
Ten Years Thailand		Aditya Assarat, Wisit Sasanatieng, Chulayarnnon Siriphol, Apichatpong Weerasethakul	Thailand, Hong Kong, Japan
The Third Wife		Ash Mayfair	Vietnam
Three Adventures of Brooke	星稀的3次奇遇	Yuan Qing	China, Malaysia

=== Cinema Today ===
English title	Original title	Director(s)	Production countrie(s)
Angelo		Markus Schleinzer	Austria, Luxembourg
Another Day of Life	Jeszcze dzień życia	Raúl de la Fuente, Damian Nenow	Poland, Spain, Belgium, Germany, Hungary
Border	Gräns	Ali Abbasi	Sweden, Denmark
The Chambermaid	La camarista	Lila Avilés	Mexico
Girl		Lukas Dhont	Belgium
The Gospel According to André		Kate Novack	United States
The Guilty	Den skyldige	Gustav Möller	Denmark
Happy as Lazzaro	Lazzaro felice	Alice Rohrwacher	Italy
I Do Not Care If We Go Down in History as Barbarians	Îmi este indiferent dacă în istorie vom intra ca barbari	Radu Jude	Romania, Czech Republic, France, Bulgaria, Germany
The Image Book	Le livre d'image	Jean-Luc Godard	Switzerland
John McEnroe: In the Realm of Perfection	L'empire de la perfection	Julien Faraut	France
Non-Fiction	Doubles vies	Olivier Assayas	France
Our Time	Nuestro tiempo	Carlos Reygadas	Mexico, France, Germany, Denmark, Sweden
Ray & Liz		Richard Billingham	United Kingdom
Sorry to Bother You		Boots Riley	United States
Transit		Christian Petzold	Germany, France
Vox Lux		Brady Corbet	United States
Winter Flies	Všechno bude	Olmo Omerzu	Czech Republic, Slovenia, Poland, Slovakia
The Wolf House	La casa lobo	Cristobal León & Joaquín Cociña	Chile

=== Singapore Panorama ===
English title	Original title	Director(s)	Production countrie(s)
15 (2003)		Royston Tan	Singapore
Cannonball		Mark Chua, Lam Li Shuen	Singapore, Australia
The Last Artisan		Craig McTurk	Singapore
Shorts
2200 Volts		Tan Siyou	Singapore, United States
A Dance for Ren Hang		Lei Yuan Bin	Singapore, Macau
Distance	空间	Grace Swee	Singapore, United States
Let Me Kill My Mother First	弒母日记	Mei Ann Teo	Singapore
May and June		Chew Chia Shao Min	Singapore, United States
Salted Egg		Nikki Koh	Singapore
Sin-Sfo		Leon Cheo	Singapore, United States
Songs of Our Memories	Canciones de memorias	Carin Leong	Singapore, Cuba, United States
You Idiot		Kris Ong	Singapore

=== Classics ===
English title	Original title	Director(s)	Production countrie(s)
A Broad Bellflower (1987)	도라지꽃	Jo Kyung Sun	North Korea
The Iron Ladies (2001)	สตรีเหล็ก	Yongyoot Thongkongtoon	Thailand
Midnight Express (1978)		Alan Parker	United Kingdom
Sepet (2004)		Yasmin Ahmad	Malaysia

=== Midnight Madness ===
English title	Original title	Director(s)	Production countrie(s)
Alpha, the Right to Kill		Brillante Mendoza	Philippines
In Fabric		Peter Strickland	United Kingdom
Luz		Tilman Singer	Germany
One Cut of the Dead	カメラを止めるな！	Shinichiro Ueda	Japan

== Awards ==
The following awards were presented at the festival:

=== Asian Film Feature Competition ===
- Best Film: A Land Imagined by Yeo Siew Hua
- Best Director: Pham Thu Hang for The Future Cries Beneath Our Soils
- Special Mention: Dayan by Behrouz Nooranipour
- Best Performance: Manoranjan Das for Bulbul Can Sing

=== Southeast Asian Short Film Competition ===
- Best Film: A Million Years by Danech San
- Best Singapore Short Film: Luzon by Chiang Wei Liang
- Special Mention: With History In A Room Filled With People With Funny Names 4 by Korakrit Arunanondchai
- Best Director: Aditya Ahmad for A Gift
- Youth Jury Prize: A Gift by Aditya Ahmad

=== Honorary Award ===
- Rithy Panh

=== Cinema Legend Award ===
- Joan Chen
