= Joseph Marwa =

Joseph Marwa may refer to:

- Joseph Marwa (boxer)
- Joseph Marwa (actor)
