= Singapore International Film Festival =

Film festival in Singapore

- Location: Singapore
- Founded: 1987; 39 years ago
- Awards: Silver Screen Awards
- Festival date: 21 October – 1 November 2026
- Website: sgiff.com

Current: 36th
- 37th 35th

The Singapore International Film Festival (SGIFF) (Chinese: 新加坡国际电影节) is the longest-running film festival in Singapore, founded in 1987.

The 36th Singapore International Film Festival took place from 26 November to 7 December 2025. From the 37th edition the festival shifted to October and will take place from 21 October to 1 November 2026.

== History ==
Originally launched to give local audiences an opportunity to watch independent and non-commercial films, the festival is now recognized worldwide by film critics for its focus on Asian filmmakers and promotion of Southeast Asian films.

The SGIFF was founded by Geoff Malone and Mill Valley Film Festival board member L. Leland Whitney in 1987.

The 24th edition of SGIFF held in 2011 faced issues such as poor organisation and financial woes due to lack of sponsorships. Founder Geoffrey Malone also resigned as the chairman of the Board of Directors with Shaw Soo Wei, former Executive Director of the Hong Kong International Film Festival Society, taking over as the chairman.

The SGIFF went on a hiatus for the next two years and in 2013, Minister for Communications and Information Yaacob Ibrahim announced the 25th edition of the SGIFF will be held in 2014 in combination with the Asia TV Forum and Market, Screen Singapore and the Asian Television Awards in a two-week event.

For the 33rd edition in 2022, the film #LookAtMe, directed by Ken Kwek, was originally scheduled to be screened at the SGIFF but was refused classification by Infocomm Media Development Authority (IMDA), which effectively barred the film from being screened in Singapore for "its potential to cause enmity and social division". IMDA, Ministry of Culture, Community and Youth, and Ministry of Home Affairs also stated that the pastor in the film engages "in an act prohibited by his professed religious faiths"; that the depictions of the pastor in the film are "suggestive of a real pastor in Singapore", and the allegations may be "perceived to be offensive, defamatory and contrary to the Maintenance of Religious Harmony Act". However, even with the ban, SGIFF decided to include the film in its advertised line-up, though the film was marked as unavailable for screening.

For the 35th edition in 2024, the SGIFF was managed by a new general manager, Jeremy Chua. Local actress Rebecca Lim was named as SGIFF's first ambassador for the festival. Daniel Hui's film, Small Hours Of The Night, an official selection for the SGIFF was submitted for classification by IMDA for the festival but was refused classification by IMDA in November. The lack of classification for the film resulted it being unable to screen at the SGIFF. SGIFF programme director Thong Kay Wee continued to support the film and list it as an official selection.

=== Overview ===
Edition	Year	Opening film	Closing film	Ref(s)
1st	1987	The Name of the Rose by Jean-Jacques Annaud	The Mission by Roland Joffé	
2nd	1989	The Glass Menagerie by Paul Newman	Testimony by Tony Palmer	
3rd	1990	The Children by Tony Palmer	Blue Steel by Kathryn Bigelow	
4th	1991	Cyrano de Bergerac by Jean-Paul Rappeneau	Dreams by Akira Kurosawa	
5th	1992	Raise the Red Lantern by Zhang Yimou	A Brighter Summer Day by Edward Yang	
6th	1993	The Trial by David Jones	Strictly Ballroom by Baz Luhrmann	
7th	1994	The Blue Kite by Tian Zhuangzhuang	The Scent of Green Papaya by Tran Anh Hung	
8th	1995	The Red Lotus Society by Stan Lai	Amateur by Hal Hartley	
9th	1996	The Confessional by Robert Lepage	Memories by Kōji Morimoto, Tensai Okamura and Katsuhiro Otomo	
10th	1997	Gabbeh by Mohsen Makhmalbaf	Breaking the Waves by Lars von Trier	
11th	1998	Hana-bi by Takeshi Kitano	Happy Together by Wong Kar-wai	
12th	1999	Ordinary Heroes by Ann Hui	The Hole by Tsai Ming-liang	
13th	2000	Monday by Sabu	The Wind Will Carry Us by Abbas Kiarostami	
14th	2001	Yi Yi by Edward Yang	Eureka by Shinji Aoyama	
15th	2002	Kandahar by Mohsen Makhmalbaf	What Time Is It There? by Tsai Ming-liang	
16th	2003	Chi-hwa-seon by Im Kwon-taek	Divine Intervention by Elia Suleiman	
17th	2004	Spring, Summer, Fall, Winter... and Spring by Kim Ki-duk	Goodbye, Dragon Inn by Tsai Ming-liang	
18th	2005	Steamboy by Katsuhiro Otomo	Ghost in the Shell 2: Innocence by Mamoru Oshii	
19th	2006	Dunia by Jocelyne Saab	4:30 by Royston Tan	
20th	2007	Sankara by Prasanna Jayakody	Opera Jawa by Garin Nugroho	
21st	2008	The Princess of Nebraska by Wayne Wang	Road to Dawn by Derek Chiu	
22nd	2009	Sincerely Yours by Rich Lee	Milk by Semih Kaplanoğlu	
23rd	2010	Mao's Last Dancer by Bruce Beresford	Dear Doctor by Miwa Nishikawa	
24th	2011	Red Light Revolution by Sam Voutas	Senna by Asif Kapadia	
25th	2014	Unlucky Plaza by Ken Kwek	In the Absence of the Sun by Lucky Kuswandi	
26th	2015	Panay by Cheng Yu-chieh	—N/a	
27th	2016	Interchange by Dain Iskandar Said	—N/a	
28th	2017	Angels Wear White by Vivian Qu	—N/a	
29th	2018	Cities of Last Things by Ho Wi Ding	—N/a	
30th	2019	Wet Season by Anthony Chen	The Truth by Hirokazu Kore-eda	
31st	2020	Tiong Bahru Social Club by Tan Bee Thiam	—N/a	
32nd	2021	Vengeance Is Mine, All Others Pay Cash by Edwin	—N/a	
33rd	2022	Assault by Adilkhan Yerzhanov	—N/a	
34th	2023	Tiger Stripes by Amanda Nell Eu	—N/a	
35th	2024	Stranger Eyes by Yeo Siew Hua	—N/a	
36th	2025	Girl by Shu Qi		
37th	2026	The Assassin(s) by Hur Jin-ho		

== Awards ==
The Silver Screen Awards Competition was introduced in 1991 to encourage advances in Asian film-making standards. Every year, a selection of Asian feature and short films take part in the competition. In 2014, the Southeast Asian Short Film category was introduced, replacing the Singapore Short Film category. The first Southeast Asian Film Lab was introduced in 2015.
