= 31st Singapore International Film Festival =

2020 film festival

- Opening film: Tiong Bahru Social Club by Tan Bee Thiam
- Location: Singapore
- Festival date: 26 November–6 December 2020
- Website: sgiff.com

Singapore International Film Festival
- 32nd 30th

The 31st annual Singapore International Film Festival took place from 26 November to 6 December 2020 in Singapore. Due to the COVID-19 pandemic, the festival was held hybrid, combining physical and virtual screenings. The festival opened with satirical comedy film Tiong Bahru Social Club by Tan Bee Thiam.

Ivan Ayr's Milestone won the festival's main award Silver Screen Award for Best Asian Film.

== Official selection ==
=== Opening film ===
English title	Original title	Director(s)	Production countrie(s)
Tiong Bahru Social Club		Tan Bee Thiam	Singapore

=== In competition ===
English title	Original title	Director(s)	Production countrie(s)
A Balance	由宇子の天秤	Yujiro Harumoto	Japan
Beginning	დასაწყისი	Dea Kulumbegashvili	Georgia, France
The Cloud In Her Room	她房间里的云	Zheng Lu Xinyuan	China, Hong Kong
Geranium	Sardunya	Çağıl Bocut	Turkey
Milestone	मील पत्थर	Ivan Ayr	India
No Love for the Young	Tiada Cinta Selama Muda	Ridhwan Saidi	Malaysia
Tiong Bahru Social Club		Tan Bee Thiam	Singapore
The Wasteland	دشت خاموش	Ahmad Bahrami	Iran

=== Singapore Panorama ===
English title	Original title	Director(s)	Production countrie(s)
Citizen Hustler	好公民	Tan Biyun	Singapore
Faraway My Shadow Wandered	遠く離れた影	Liao Jiekai, Sudhee Liao	Singapore, Japan
Not My Mother's Baking	不是我妈妈的烘焙	Remi M. Sali	Singapore
Sementara		Chew Chia Shao Min, Joant Úbeda	Singapore

=== Asian Vision ===
English title	Original title	Director(s)	Production countrie(s)
100 Times Reproduction of Democracy		Chulayarnnon Siriphol	Thailand
Aswang		Alyx Ayn Arumpac	France, Germany, Norway, Philippines, Qatar, Denmark
Days	日子	Tsai Ming-liang	Taiwan
Genus Pan	Lahi, Hayop	Lav Diaz	Philippines
Keep Rolling	好好拍電影	Man Lim Chung	Hong Kong
Ploy		Prapat Jiwarangsan	Thailand, Singapore
The Salt In Our Waters	নোনাজলের কাব্য	Rezwan Shahriar Sumit	Bangladesh, France
The Shepherdess and the Seven Songs	Laila aur satt geet	Pushpendra Singh	India
True Mothers	朝が来る	Naomi Kawase	Japan
Veins of the World	Die Adern der Welt	Byambasuren Davaa	Germany, Mongolia
Wife of a Spy	スパイの妻	Kiyoshi Kurosawa	Japan
The Woman Who Ran	도망친 여자	Hong Sang-soo	South Korea
Yellow Cat	Сары мысық	Adilkhan Yerzhanov	Kazakhstan, France
You and I		Fanny Chotimah	Indonesia

=== Cinema Today ===
English title	Original title	Director(s)	Production countrie(s)
Ammonite		Francis Lee	United Kingdom
Downstream to Kinshasa	En route pour le milliard	Dieudo Hamadi	Democratic Republic of the Congo, France, Belgium
First Cow		Kelly Reichardt	United States
Gagarine		Fanny Liatard, Jérémy Trouilh	France
Here We Are		Nir Bergman	Italy
Identifying Features	Sin Señas Particulares	Fernanda Veladez	Mexico, Spain
Malmkrog		Cristi Puiu	Romania
New Order	Nuevo orden	Michel Franco	Mexico
Night of the Kings	La Nuit des rois	Philippe Lacôte	France, Côte d'Ivoire, Canada, Senegal
Nomadland		Chloé Zhao	United States
A Perfectly Normal Family	En helt almindelig familie	Malou Reymann	Denmark
Slalom		Charlène Favier	France
The Truffle Hunters		Michael Dweck, Gregory Kershaw	Italy, United States, Greece
Window Boy Would Also Like to Have a Submarine	Chico ventana también quisiera tener un submarino	Alex Piperno	Uruguay, Argentina, Brazil, Netherlands, Philippines

== Awards ==
The following awards were presented at the festival:

Asian Film Feature Competition

- Best Film: Milestone by Ivan Ayr
- Best Director: Dea Kulumbegashvili for Beginning
- Best Performance: Suvinder Vicky for Milestone

Southeast Asian Short Film Competition

- Best Southeast Asian Film Competition: Tellurian Drama by Riar Rizaldi
- Best Director: Lin Htet Aung for Estate
- Best Singapore Short Film: Here Is Not There by Nelson Yeo
- Youth Jury Prize: The Unseen River by Phạm Ngọc Lân
- Special Mention: Red Aninsri; Or, Tiptoeing on the Still Trembling Berlin Wall by Ratchapoom Boonbunchachoke

Audience Choice Award: Sementara by Chew Chia Shao Min and Joant Úbeda
