= The Eternal Springtime (film) =

- Vietnamese: Mùa xuân vĩnh cửu
- Directed by: Việt Vũ
- Written by: Việt Vũ
- Screenplay by: Việt Vũ
- Produced by: Việt Vũ; Dương Diệu Linh; Phạm Quang Trung
- Starring: Nguyễn Thị Tơ; Việt Vũ
- Cinematography: Huy Phùng
- Edited by: Việt Vũ
- Distributed by: Mailuki Films
- Release date: February 4, 2021 (IFFR)
- Running time: 26 minutes
- Country: Vietnam
- Language: Vietnamese

The Eternal Springtime (Vietnamese: Mùa xuân vĩnh cửu) is a 2021 Vietnamese documentary short film directed by Việt Vũ, which distributed by Mailuki Films. The film was selected to compete in the Ammodo Tiger Short section at the 50th International Film Festival Rotterdam.

== Plot ==
In a world nearing disappearance, a mother and her son journey into an ancestral cave in search of renewal. As they sit silently together in their modest refuge, a gentle, intimate energy flows between their bare bodies. This personal portrait delves into the fragile present of a formerly colonised nation navigating its shift into the digital era. Told from a first-person viewpoint, the film also experiments with new ways of storytelling.

== Cast ==
- Nguyễn Thị Tơ
- Việt Vũ
- Phạm Quang Trung
- Giàng A Pào
- Giàng A Sưa
- Hoang Thi Tu

== Funding ==
This film was developed and funded by the CJ Short Film Project (Dự án phim ngắn CJ), under the supervision of director Phan Đăng Di and actress cum film producer Phạm Thị Hồng Ánh. The project funded 300.000.000 VND (roughly 10.000 USD) for the production of the film.

== Production ==
The film was shot in two years. The director scouted various locations from the North and to the South of Vietnam. The cave scene and the waterfall scenes were shot in the North of Vietnam - which is typical landscapes that only exists in the North of Vietnam. Meanwhile, the scenes of the mother walking in a landscape on the brink of extinction was shot in U Minh Thượng forest, a famous forest in the South of Vietnam.

The film was made in style of docu-fiction. The main cast are the filmmaker and his own mother. Meanwhile, the narrative is a fictional one that evokes stream of thoughts of a son in anxiety, trying to find back into the lap of nature mother to find some warmth and revival. The title "The Eternal Springtime" refers to a "lost golden time" and has nostalgic sense.

== Awards ==
- Won – 66th Cork International Film Festival: Grand Prix Documentary Short
- Won – 12th Baku International Short Film Festival: Best Director Award (Việt Vũ)
- Won - 4th Rain International Nature Film Festival (2022), India: Best Fiction Short

== Screenings ==
- 11th Beijing International Short Film Festival, International Competition, China (2021)

- 10th Kyiv International Short Film Festival, International Competition, Ukraine (2021)

- 11th AGON, International Archaeological Film Festival, International Competition, Greece (2022)

- 5th Santander International Indepdent Film Festival, Opening Film, Colombia (2022)

- 49th International Athens Film and Video Festival, Ohio, U.S.A (2022)

- 4th Rain International Nature Film Festival, Kerala, India (2022)

== Censorship ==
According to the interview with authors, the first cut was firstly banned in Vietnam for reasons of "violating traditional moral norms" before it was re-edited into the full final version. Together with this ban, the film was also removed from the list of films supported by CJ Short Film Project.

== Critics Reception ==
The film was well received after having world premiere at IFFR 2021. It was praisede by Asian Movie Pulse as a poetic and experimental short film that explores identity, anxiety, and the search for belonging through intimate, dreamlike imagery. Centered on a symbolic mother-son relationship, it reflects the tension between tradition and modernity in a changing Vietnam, while evoking themes of memory, healing, and a longing to return to one's origins.
