= 33rd Singapore International Film Festival =

2022 film festival

- Opening film: Assault by Adilkhan Yerzhanov
- Location: Singapore
- Festival date: 24 November–4 December 2022
- Website: sgiff.com

Singapore International Film Festival
- 34th 32nd

The 33rd annual Singapore International Film Festival was held from 24 November to 4 December 2022 in Singapore. A total of 101 films from 55 countries were screened during the festival. Adilkhan Yerzhanov's thriller film Assault opened the festival. Two new program sections, Altitude and Horizon, were introduced during the festival. Singaporean film #LookAtMe and Portuguese-French film Will-o'-the-Wisp were refused classification by the Infocomm Media Development Authority and were therefore banned from screening at the festival.

Thriller film Autobiography won the festival's main award Silver Screen Award for Best Asian Film.

== Official selection ==
=== Opening film ===
English title	Original title	Director(s)	Production countrie(s)
Assault	Штурм	Adilkhan Yerzhanov	Kazakhstan

=== Asian Feature Film Competition ===
English title	Original title	Director(s)	Production countrie(s)
Archaeology of Love	사랑의 고고학	Lee Wan-min	South Korea
Arnold Is a Model Student	อานนเป็นนักเรยนตัวอ ี ย่าง	Sorayos Prapapan	Thailand, Singapore, France, Netherlands, Philippines
Autobiography		Makbul Mubarak	Indonesia, France, Germany, Poland, Singapore, Philippines, Qatar
The Cloud Messenger	Meghdoot	Rahat Mahajan	India
Convenience Store	Продукты 24	Michael Borodin	Russia, Slovenia, Turkey
Gaga	哈勇家	Laha Mebow	Taiwan
Joyland		Saim Sadiq	Pakistan
Leonor Will Never Die	Ang Pagbabalik ng Kwago	Martika Ramirez Escobar	Philippines
Summer with Hope	Tabestan Ba Omid	Sadaf Foroughi	Canada, Iran

=== Singapore Panorama ===
English title	Original title	Director(s)	Production countrie(s)
#LookAtMe		Ken Kwek	Singapore
Absent Smile		John Clang, Lavender Chang	Singapore
Baby Queen		Lei Yuan Bin	Singapore
Before Life After Death		Anshul Tiwari	Singapore
Boom		Derrick Chew	Singapore
Geylang	芽籠	Boi Kwong	Singapore

=== Foreground ===
English title	Original title	Director(s)	Production countrie(s)
The Abandoned	查無此心	Tseng Ying-ting	Taiwan
The Fifth Thoracic Vertebra	다섯 번째 흉추	Park Sye-young	South Korea
Nocebo		Lorcan Finnegan	Ireland, Philippines
Smoking Causes Coughing	Fumer fait tousser	Quentin Dupieux	France
Will-o'-the-Wisp	Fogo-Fátuo	João Pedro Rodrigues	Portugal, France
World War III	جنگ جهانی سوم	Houman Seyyedi	Iran

=== Altitude ===
English title	Original title	Director(s)	Production countrie(s)
Alcarràs		Carla Simón	Spain, Italy
Goliath		Adilkhan Yerzhanov	Kazakhstan
No Bears	خرس نیست	Jafar Panahi	Iran
The Novelist's Film	소설가의 영화	Hong Sang-soo	South Korea
R.M.N.		Cristian Mungiu	Romania, France
A Tale of Filipino Violence	Isang Salaysay ng Karahasang Pilipino	Lav Diaz	Philippines

=== Horizon ===
English title	Original title	Director(s)	Production countrie(s)
Aftersun		Charlotte Wells	United Kingdom, United States
Divine Factory		Joseph Mangat	Philippines, United States, Taiwan
Dry Ground Burning	Mato seco em chamas	Joana Pimenta, Adirley Queirós	Brazil, Portugal
La Jauría		Andrés Ramírez Pulido	France, Colombia
Leila's Brothers	برادران لیلا	Saeed Roustayi	Iran
A Long Journey Home	五口之家	Zhang Wenqian	China
Nayola		José Miguel Ribeiro	Portugal, Belgium, France, Netherlands
Return to Seoul	Retour à Séoul	Davy Chou	France, Germany, Belgium, Cambodia, South Korea, Qatar
Small, Slow But Steady	ケイコ 目を澄ませて	Shô Miyake	Japan, France
Stone Turtle		Woo Ming Jin	Malaysia, Indonesia

=== Standpoint ===
English title	Original title	Director(s)	Production countrie(s)
The Eclipse	Formørkelsen	Nataša Urban	Norway
Geographies of Solitude		Jacquelyn Mills	Canada
A House Made of Splinters	Будинок із трісок	Simon Lereng Wilmont	Denmark, Finland, Sweden, Ukraine
How to Save a Dead Friend		Marusya Syroechkovskaya	Sweden, Norway, France, Germany
I Didn't See You There		Reid Davenport	United States
Jiseok		Kim Young-jo	South Korea
Myanmar Diaries	မြန်မာဒိုင်ယာရီ	Myanmar Film Collective	Myanmar, Netherlands, Norway
We Don't Dance for Nothing		Stefanos Tai	Hong Kong, Philippines

=== Domain ===
English title	Original title	Director(s)	Production countrie(s)
The Dam	السد	Ali Cherri	France, Sudan, Lebanon, Germany, Serbia, Qatar
Foragers	اليد الخضراء	Jumana Manna	Palestine
Hanging Gardens	الحدائق المعلقة	Ahmed Yassin Al Daradji	Iraq, Palestine, Saudi Arabia, Egypt, United Kingdom
Nezouh	نزوح	Soudade Kaadan	United Kingdom, Syria, France
Under the Fig Trees	تحت شجر التين	Erige Sehiri	Tunisia, France, Switzerland, Germany, Qatar

== Awards ==
The following awards were presented at the festival:

Asian Feature Film Competition

- Best Asian Feature Film: Autobiography by Makbul Mubarak
- Special Mention: Arnold Is a Model Student by Sorayos Prapapan
- Best Director: Laha Mebow for Gaga
- Best Performance: Zukhara Sanzysbay for Convenience Store

Southeast Asian Short Film Competition

- Best Southeast Asian Short Film: Vania on Lima Street by Bayu Prihantoro Filemon
- Special Mention: Dikit by Gabriela Serrano
- Best Singapore Short Film: Smoke Gets In Your Eyes by Alvin Lee
- Best Director: Le Lam Vien for Fix Anything
- Best Performance: Bopha Oul for Further and Further Away

Audience Choice Award: How to Save a Dead Friend by Marusya Syroechkovskaya

=== Outstanding Contribution to Southeast Asian Cinema Award ===
- In-Docs
