= 50th International Film Festival Rotterdam =

2021 edition of IFFR

- Opening film: Riders of Justice by Anders Thomas Jensen (February); The World to Come by Mona Fastvold (June)
- Closing film: Poupelle of Chimney Town by Hirota Yusuke (June)
- Location: Rotterdam, Netherlands
- Founded: 1972
- Awards: Pebbles (Tiger Award)
- Festival date: 1–7 February 2021; 2–6 June 2021
- Website: iffr.com

IFFR chronology
- 2022 2020

The 50th International Film Festival Rotterdam, was the 2021 installment of the International Film Festival Rotterdam, which took place on 1–7 February 2021 and 2–6 June 2021. The first part of the edition focused on the main Tiger, Big Screen, Ammodo Tiger Short, and Limelight programmes. Whilst, the second part focused on the Harbour, Bright Future, Cinema Regained, Classics and Short and Mid-Length Film sections.

The event was presented as a hybrid event, with a film programme was available online in the Netherlands whilst physically screened in cinemas across the country.

Indian drama film, Pebbles by Vinothraj P.S., won Tiger Award, the top prize.

== Juries ==
=== Tiger ===
- Lemohang Jeremiah Mosese, Mosotho screenwriter, film director and visual artist
- Orwa Nyrabia, Syrian documentary film festival director
- Hala Elkoussy, Egyptian artist and film director
- Helena van der Meulen, Dutch screenwriter and film critic
- Ilse Hughan, Dutch film producer

=== Ammodo Tiger Short ===
- Anna Abrahams, audiovisual curator
- Amira Gad, Egyptian-French curator and writer
- Vincent Meessen, filmmaker

== Official selections ==
=== Tiger ===
The following films were selected to compete for the Tiger Award. The line-up was announced on 22 December 2020.

English title	Original title	Director(s)	Production countrie(s)
Bebia, à mon seul désir		Juja Dobrachkous	Georgia, United Kingdom
Bipolar	只是一次偶然的旅行	Queena Li	China
Black Medusa	Ma tasmaa ken errih	Ismaël, Youssef Chebbi	Tunisia
A Corsican Summer	I Comete	Pascal Tagnati	France
The Edge of Daybreak	Phayasohk phiyohkyam	Taiki Sakpisit	Thailand
Feast		Tim Leyendekker	Netherlands
Friends and Strangers		James Vaughan	Australia
Gritt		Itonje Søimer Guttormsen	Norway
Landscapes of Resistance	Pejzaži otpora	Marta Popivoda	Serbia, Germany, France
Liborio		Nino Martínez Sosa	Dominican Republic, Puerto Rico, Qatar
Looking for Venera	Në kërkim të Venerës	Norika Sefa	Kosovo, North Macedonia
Madalena		Madiano Marcheti	Brazil
Mayday		Karen Cinnore	United States
Mighty Flash	Destello bravío	Ainhoa Rodríguez	Spain
Moss Agate	Agate mousse	Selim Mourad	Lebanon
Pebbles	Koozhangal	Vinothraj P.S.	India

=== Big Screen ===
The following films were selected to compete for the VPRO Big Screen Award. The line-up was announced on 22 December 2020.

English title	Original title	Director(s)	Production countrie(s)
Archipelago	Archipel	Félix Dufour-Laperrière	Canada
Aristocrats	Anoko wa kizoku	Sode Yukiko	Japan
As We Like It	Jie da huan xi	Chen Hung-i, Muni Wei	Taiwan
Aurora		Paz Fábrega	Costa Rica
The Cemil Show	Cemil şov	Bariş Sarhan	Turkey
The Dog Who Wouldn't Be Quiet	El perro que no calla	Ana Katz	Argentina
Drifting	Zuk seoi piu lau	Jun Li	Hong Kong
King Car	Carro Rei	Renata Pinheiro	Brazil
The Last Farmer	Kadaisi vivasayi	M. Manikandan	India
Lone Wolf		Jonathan Ogilvie	Australia
The North Wind	Severnyy veter	Renata Litvinova	Russia
Sexual Drive	セクシャルドライブ	Kōta Yoshida	Japan
The Witches of the Orient	Les Sorcières de l'Orient	Julien Faraut	France
The Year Before the War	Gads pirms kara	Dāvis Sīmanis	Latvia, Lithuania, Czech Republic

=== Ammodo Tiger Short ===
The following films were selected to compete for the Ammodo Tiger Short Competition. The line-up was announced on 22 December 2020.

English title	Original title	Director(s)	Production countrie(s)
80000 Years Old	80000 ans	Christelle Lheureux	France
earthearthearth		Daïchi Saïto	Canada
Eating Soil	Erde essen	Laura Weissenberger	Austria
Er is een geest van mij		Mateo Vega	Netherlands, Peru
The Eternal Springtime	Mùa xuân vĩnh cửu	Việt Vũ	Vietnam
Flowers blooming in our throats		Eva Giolo	Italy
For the Sake of Calmness		Newsha Tavakolian	Iran
Happy Valley		Simon Liu	Hong Kong, United States
The Hole's Journey		Ghita Skali	Netherlands
Lemongrass Girl		Pom Bunsermvicha	Thailand
Letter From Your Far-Off Country		Suneil Sanzgiri	United States
Luces del desierto		Félix Blume	France, Mexico
Maat Means Land		Fox Maxy	United States
Manifesto		Ane Hjort Guttu	Norway
Plant (879 pages, 33 days)		Ruth Höflich	Australia
Sunsets, everyday		Basir Mahmood	Italy
Surviving You, Always		Morgan Quaintance	United Kingdom
Tellurian Drama		Riar Rizaldi	Indonesia
Terranova		Alejandro Pérez Serrano, Alejandro Alonso Estrella	Cuba
Tracing Utopia		Catarina de Sousa, Nick Tyson	Portugal, United States
Who Is Afraid of Ideology? Part 3 Micro Resistances		Marwa Arsanios	Germany
The Women's Revenge		Su Hui-yu	Taiwan

=== Art Directions ===
The programme highlighted the expansion of cinema to installations, exhibitions and live performance.

English title	Original title	Director(s)	Production countrie(s)
The Hangman at Home		Michelle Kranot, Uri Kranot	Denmark, France, Canada
Image Technology Echoes		Lauren Moffatt	Ireland, Germany
The Subterranean Imprint Archive		Francois Knoetze, Amy Louise Wilson	South Africa
To Miss the Ending		David Callanan, Anna West	United Kingdom

=== Bright Future ===
The programme highlighted first-feature films from promising filmmakers.

English title	Original title	Director(s)	Production countrie(s)
All About My Sisters	Jia ting lu xiang	Wang Qiong	United States
BERG		Joke Olthaar	Netherlands
Damascus Dreams		Émilie Serri	Canada
The Day Is Over	Chi tang	Qi Rui	China
Faya Dayi		Jessica Bashir	Ethiopia, United States, Qatar
The Joy of Things	A felicidade das coisas	Thais Fujinaga	Brazil
Lumina		Samuele Sestieri	Italy
OK Computer		Pooja Shetty, Neil Pagedar	India
Phoenix		Bram Droulers	Belgium, United Kingdom
Rock Bottom Riser		Fern Silva	United States
The Son	Pesar	Noushin Meraji	Iran
The Story of Southern Islet	Nan wu	Chong Keat Aun	Malaysia
Thomas the High Jumper	Thomas der Hochspringer	Leri Matehha	Germany
Woodlands Dark and Days Bewitched: A History of Folk Horror		Kier-La Janisse	United States

=== Cinema Regained ===
The programme offered restored classic films, documentaries on film culture and explorations of cinema's heritage.

English title	Original title	Director(s)	Year	Production countrie(s)
The 12 Day Tale of the Monster That Died in 8		Shunji Iwai	2020	Japan
The Tenth of May	Der 10. Mai	Franz Schnyder	1957	Switzerland
All Other Things Equal		Anya Tsyrlina	2020	Russia
Amos Gitaï, la violence et l'histoire		Laurent Roth	2021	France
The Amusement Park		George A. Romero	1975	United States
Ayako Tachibana Wants to Go Viral	Tachibana Ayako wa miraretai	Sato Amane	2020	Japan
Black Cat		Tanaami Keiichi	1972	Japan
The Calm After the Storm	Como el cielo después de llover	Mercedes Gaviria	2020	Colombia, Argentina
Camila		María Luisa Bemberg	1984	Argentina, Spain
Careless Crime	Jenayat-e bi deghat	Shahram Mokri	2020	Iran
Charisma		Amos Gitai	1976	Israel
Chess of the Wind	Shatranj-e baad	Mohammad Reza Aslani	1976	Iran
Cinephilia Now: Part 1 – Secrets Within Walls	Eiga ai no genzai: Part 1 – Kabe no mukode	Sasaki Yusuke	2020	Japan
The Crown Jewels of Iran	Ganǧīneh-hāye Gouhar	Ebrahim Golestan	1965	Iran
The Deer	Gavaznhā	Masoud Kimiai	1974	Iran
The Demon	Il demonio	Brunello Rondi	1963	Italy, France
The Dinosaur	Dinosaurus	Veikko Aaltonen	2021	Finland
The Earth Is a Sinful Song	Maa on syntinen laulu	Rauni Mollberg	1973	Finland
Everything Is Cinema		Don Palathara	2021	India
Fat Chance		Stephen Broomer	2021	Canada
Hands Up Mr. Rasnichi		Hal Clay, Florenz Fuchs von Nordhoff	1967	West Germany
Hopper/Welles		Orson Welles	2020	United States
The Living Heroes	Gyvieji didvyriai	Arūnas Žebriūnas, Balys Bratkauskas, Vytautas Žalakevičius, Marijonas Giedrys	1959	Lithuania
María Luisa Bemberg: El eco de mi voz	María Luisa Bemberg: The Echo of My Voice	Alejandro Maci	2021	Argentina
Mat Magic		Mat Sentol, John Calvert	1971	Singapore
MÍR: Hundred Years of Revolution	MÍR: Byltingin lengi lifi	Haukur Hallsson	2020	Iceland, Czech Republic
Modern Korea – Doing Our Best the People's Network	Modern Korea – Jeongseongeul da haneun gungminui bangsong	Ji-sun Youm	2020	South Korea
Neck 'n' Neck		Walt Disney	1928	United States
Nomads of the Sun	Les nomades du soleil	Henry Brandt	1953	Switzerland
The Philosophy of Horror – A Symphony of Film Theory	A horror filozófiája	Péter Lichter, Bori Máté	2020	Hungary
Les rendez-vous de l'été		Jacques Ertaud, Raymond Zumstein	1966	France
Sea Palace	Umi no kyūden	Masaoka Kenzō	1927	Japan
Switzerland Ponders	La Suisse s'interroge	Henry Brandt	1964	Switzerland
Tange Sazen and the Pot Worth a Million Ryo	Tange Sazen yowa: Hyakuman ryō no tsubo	Sadao Yamanaka	1935	Japan
There Are Not Thirty-Six Ways of Showing a Man Getting on a Horse	No existen treinta y seis maneras de mostrar cómo un hombre se sube a un caballo	Nicolás Zukerfeld	2020	Argentina
The Village Detective: a Song Cycle		Bill Morrison	2021	United States
Vincent van Go-Go		Hal Clay, Florenz Fuchs von Nordhoff	1967	West Germany

=== Harbour ===
The programme showcased contemporary cinema.

English title	Original title	Director(s)	Production countrie(s)
Accidental Luxuriance of the Translucent Watery Rebus	Slučajna raskoš prozirnog vodenog rebusa	Dalibor Barić	Croatia
Amor fati		Cláudia Varejão	Portugal, Switzerland, France
The Belly of the Sea	El ventre del mar	Agustí Villaronga	Spain
Birds of America		Jacques Loeuille	France
The Blue Danube	Kimajimegakutai no Bonyarisenso	Ikeda Akira	Japan
Bloodsuckers	Blutsauger	Julian Radlmaier	Germany
Bottled Songs 1-4		Chloé Galibert-Laîné, Kevin B. Lee	Germany, France, United States
Capitu and the Chapter	Capitu e o capítulo	Júlio Bressane	Brazil
Davos		Daniel Hoesl, Julia Niemann	Austria
The Day Today	Au jour d'aujourd'hui	Maxence Stamatiadis	France
Death on the Streets		Johan Carlsen	Germany, Denmark, Greece
Decameron		Rita Hui Nga Shu	Hong Kong
Fabian – Going to the Dogs	Fabian oder Der Gang vor die Hunde	Dominik Graf	Germany
Fan Girl		Antoinette Jadaone	Philippines
Faraway My Shadow Wandered		Liao Jiekai, Sudhee Liao	Singapore, Taiwan, Japan
Fucking with Nobody		Hannaleena Hauru	Finland
Glossary of Non-Human Love	Na manush premer kothamala	Ashish Avikunthak	India
Homeless	Hom-li-seu	Lim Seung-hyeun	South Korea
Hotel on the Koppies	Hotele Lerallaneng	Charlie Vundla	South Africa
Lutar, lutar, lutar		Sérgio Borges, Helvécio Marins Jr.	Brazil
A Man and a Camera		Guido Hendrikx	Netherlands
Minamata Mandala		Hara Kazuo	Japan
My Name Is Francesco Totti	Mi chiamo Francesco Totti	Alex Infascelli	Italy
Nudo Mixteco		Ángeles Cruz	Mexico
Only the Winds		Karim Kassem	Lebanon, United States
Persona Non Grata	Hvor kragerne vender	Lisa Jespersen	Denmark
Poly Styrene: I Am a Cliché		Celeste Bell, Paul Sng	United Kingdom, India, United States
Poupelle of Chimney Town	Entotsu Machi no Poupelle	Hirota Yusuke	Japan
The Rain Falls Where It Will	Abr baranash gerefteh	Majid Barzegar	Iran, Canada
Scarecrow	Pugalo	Dmitry Davydov	Russia
Self-Portrait 2020		Lee Dong-wook	South Korea
A Song for You	Ta yu luo ye dai er	Dukar Tserang	China
Time		Ricky Ko	Hong Kong
An Unusual Summer		Kamal Aljafari	Palestine
The World to Come		Mona Fastvold	United States

=== Limelight ===
The programme showcased cinematic highlights of film festival favourites and international award-winners.

English title	Original title	Director(s)	Production countrie(s)
Beginning	Dasatskisi	Dea Kulumbegashvili	France, Georgia
Dead & Beautiful		David Verbeek	Netherlands, Taiwan
Dear Comrades!	Dorogie tovarischi!	Andrei Konchalovsky	Russia
First Cow		Kelly Reichardt	United States
Mandibles	Mandibules	Quentin Dupieux	France
Mitra		Kaweh Modiri	Netherlands, Germany, Denmark
Night of the Kings	La nuit des rois	Philippe Lacôte	France, Côte d'Ivoire, Canada
Quo Vadis, Aida?		Jasmila Žbanić	Bosnia and Herzegovina
Riders of Justice	Retfærdighedens ryttere	Anders Thomas Jensen	Denmark
Shorta		Anders Ølholm, Frederik Louis Hviid	Denmark
Suzanna Andler		Benoît Jacquot	France
Sweat		Magnus von Horn	Poland

=== Short & Mid-length ===
The programmes highlighted mid-length films and short films.

English title	Original title	Director(s)	Production countrie(s)
200 Cigarettes from Now		Tianyu Ma	China, United States
Aasivissuit		Jasper Coppes	Netherlands, Greenland
Art Blasé		Erik van Lieshout	Netherlands
Bare Bones		Meryem Lahlou	United States
Bela		Prantik Basu	India
The Blind Rabbit		Pallavi Paul	India
Easter Eggs		Nicolas Keppens	Belgium, France, Netherlands
Her and I	Ella i jo	Jaume Claret Muxart	Spain
Home Sweet Home		Franck Moka	Democratic Republic of the Congo
Improvised Objects		Katja Verheul	Netherlands
In the Air Tonight		Andrew Norman Wilson	United States
In the Footsteps of Li Yuan-chia & Delia Derbyshire		Madelon Hooykaas	Netherlands, United Kingdom
Jesus Egon Christ	Jesus Egon Christus	David Vajda, Saša Vajda	Germany
Kaimos		Sarra Tsorakidis	Romania
The Last One	Sonuncu	Fariz Ahmedov	Azerbaijan
Lata		Alisha Tejpal	India
Meet Doug	Le Boug Doug	Théo Jollet	France
Message from Mukalap		Judith Westerveld	Netherlands, South Africa
More Happiness		Livia Huang	United States
No One Cried		Daniel Jacoby	Netherlands, Germany
The Old Child		Felipe Esparza Pérez	France
One Image, Two Acts	Yek tasveer, do bardasht	Sanaz Sohrabi	Canada, Germany, United States, Iran
P-9830		Michiel van Bakel	Netherlands
Palma		Alexe Poukine	France, Belgium
PINPIN		Jaime Levinas	Argentina, United States
Riff-Raff	Rafameia	Mariah Teixeira, Nanda Félix	Brazil
El rodeo		Carlos Melián Moreno	Cuba
Scylos		Maaike Anne Stevens	Netherlands, United Kingdom
Seeking Aline	À la recherche d'Aline	Rokhaya Marieme Balde	Switzerland
Silence		Amirali Navaee	Iran
The Trees		Ramzi Bashour	Lebanon
Tripsitter		Frederique Pisuisse	Netherlands
Underground Cemetery		Wisarut Sriputsomboon	Thailand
UNEARTH – In Between States of Matter		Anika Schwarzlose, Brian D. McKenna	Russia, Netherlands, Germany
Unrendered Road		Tali Liberman	Israel, Palestine, Netherlands
Veronica		Talita Caselato	Brazil
World	Ashkhar	Christine Haroutounian	Armenia, United States

== Awards ==
=== Awards and competition ===
- Tiger Award: Pebbles by Vinothraj P.S.
- Special Jury Award:
  - A Corsican Summer by Pascal Tagnati
  - Looking for Venera by Norika Sefa
- Ammodo Tiger Short Award:
  - Maat Means Land by Fox Maxy
  - Sunsets, everyday by Basir Mahmood
  - Terranova by Alejandro Pérez Serrano, Alejandro Alonso Estrella
- Robby Müller Award: Kelly Reichardt
- Big Screen Competition Award: The Dog Who Wouldn't Be Quiet by Ana Katz
- IFFR Youth Jury Award: Night of the Kings by Philippe Lacôte

=== Audience Awards ===
- BankGiro Loterij Audience Award:
  - Quo Vadis, Aida? by Jasmila Žbanić (February)
  - My Name Is Francesco Totti by Alex Infascelli (June)

=== Critics Awards ===
- FIPRESCI Award: The Edge of Daybreak by Taiki Sakpisit
- KNF Award: Manifesto by Ane Hjort Guttu
