= Ten Years Thailand =

2018 Thai independent dystopian anthology film

- Theatrical film poster
- Directed by: Aditya Assarat; Wisit Sasanatieng; Chulayarnnon Siriphol; Apichatpong Weerasethakul
- Written by: Aditya Assarat; Wisit Sasanatieng; Chulayarnnon Siriphol; Apichatpong Weerasethakul
- Produced by: Cattleya Paosrijaroen; Soros Sukhum; Aditya Assarat; Felix Tsang; Lorraine Ma; Andrew Choi; Ng Ka-Leung
- Cinematography: Saran Srisingchai; Pithai Smithsuth; Pasit Tandaechanurat; Chatchai Suban
- Edited by: Kamontorn Eakwattanakij; Lee Chatametikool; Harin Paesongthai; Apichatpong Weerasethakul
- Music by: Chapavich Temnitikul; Amornbhong Methakulwudh; Viveka
- Production companies: Pop Pictures; 185 Films; Common Move; Ten Years Studio; Yoshimoto Kogyo; Free Stone Productions
- Distributed by: Golden Scene
- Release dates: 10 May 2018 (Cannes); 13 December 2018 (Thailand)
- Running time: 95 minutes
- Countries: Thailand; Hong Kong; Japan
- Language: Thai

Ten Years Thailand is a 2018 Thai independent dystopian anthology film written and directed by Aditya Assarat, Wisit Sasanatieng, Chulayarnnon Siriphol and Apichatpong Weerasethakul. Based in format on the 2015 Hong Kong film Ten Years, its four segments each offers the director's speculative take on a dystopian Thailand in 2028. The film was shown in the special screenings section at the 2018 Cannes Film Festival. A fifth segment, by Chookiat Sakveerakul, was not completed in time for the Cannes screening.
