= Abdul Nizam Abdul Hamid =

Singaporean film director (1966–2016)

Abdul Nizam Abdul Hamid (1966–2016), also known as Abdul Nizam, was an independent filmmaker, musician and vocalist from Singapore.

== Life ==
Nizam attended Anglo-Chinese School where he played football for the school team. He also played in indie bands The NoNames and The Oddfellows, and studied film and media at Ngee Ann Polytechnic.

For his final year project at Ngee Ann Polytechnic, he produced an art-house short called Datura. Datura explores what it meant to be Malay and Muslim in a modern society, and subsequently won the prize for Best Short Film at the 1999 Singapore International Film Festival (SGIFF) and third place at the International Film and TV Schools' Festival.

Abdul Nizam was also known for directing films like Keronchong For Pak Bakar (2008), a thought-provoking documentary on the cinematographer Pak Bakar, and Breaking the Ice (2014), which explores the boundaries between film and performance, the nature of art versus life, and the question of what it means to be an artist.

When he died in 2016 due to cancer, SGIFF paid tribute to him for "the instrumental role he played in the resurgence of Singapore cinema in the late 1990s". Then SGIFF Programme Director Zhang Wenjie remarked Abdul Nizam as "a filmmaker who never stopped searching for the truth and essence of our humanity in all his work".
