= Joseph Marwa (actor) =

Tanzanian actor

- Born: Joseph Marwa; 16 April 1999 (age 26); Musoma Rural District, Mara Region, Tanzania
- Other names: Josephs Quartzy
- Occupations: Actor author
- Years active: 2015–present
- Height: 1.64 m (5 ft 5 in)

Joseph Marwa also recognized by his pen name Josephs Quartzy is a Tanzanian television actor, novelist and a former lead vocalist for the music duo The Eastern Bandits.

He is best known for playing Nhwale in the romance fiction film Mr. Local Man featuring Bonnie Dennison and for playing Josephs in the drama series JQ Knew That. Joseph has appeared in supporting roles in Lucifer'e and The Great Controversy, Homeboy Never Fails and a Jewish documentary africa (2019 film). He is the author of A Tale of an Intelligent Psychopath and Irene the Andromeda.

== Publications ==
Novela and philosophy

Year	Name	Publisher	ISBN
2022	A Tale of an Intelligent Psychopath: Based on a True story	Pencil Publishers	ISBN 978-93-56104-98-3
2022	Irene: The Andromeda	Pencil Publishers	ISBN 978-93-56105-84-3
2022	A Blessed Curse (Vol 1)	Pencil Publishers	ISBN 978-93-56670-88-4
2022	Love or medicine with Eliah Thomas	Bongo Times Now	ISBN 979-82-15008-72-0
2022	Race and changes	Bongo Times Now	ISBN 979-82-15423-83-7
2022	Philosophies from an old Journal	Bongo Times Now	ISBN 979-82-15331-75-0
2023	A Blessed Curse (Vol 2)	Bongo Times Now	ISBN 979-82-15564-13-4
2023	Proven laws of life you must know (vol 1)	Bongo Times Now	ISBN 979-82-15749-78-4

Poetry

Year	Name	Publisher	ISBN
2022	Sweetest Song I Know	Bongo Times Now	ISBN 979-82-01741-25-9

== Filmography ==
=== Movies ===
Year	Film	Role	Notes/Cast
2016	There's no Place like Home	Kenny Doe	with Adrian Collins, Conroy Esterhuizen, Marty Kintu, Matthew Dylan Robert, Billings Siwila, Dawid van den Bergh and Claire Verstraete
2019	Mr. Local Man	Nhwale	With Bonnie Dennison, Emil Marwa and Agness Nyama
2019	Africa (2019 film)	Ngowi	With Oren Gerner, Maya Gerner, Meir Gerner and Tom Kros Zynski
2019	NIGGA	DOS	With Titus Covington, Maricela Janette Garcia and Dujhan Brown
2019	Mission XVI	Capt Black/Director	With Zed Josef
2020	Not so different	Jean	with Joselyn Bates, Chad Bear, Cate Blair-wilhelm, Bryan Michael Block, Brian Bowman, Amy Parsons, Matt starr and Jessica Joerndt
2020	Lucifer'e and The Great Controversy	Ange Joe	With Janeth Mora and Tamil
2022	Homeboy Never Fails	YB	With Lawrence Christopher, Jacob Mkweche, Simon Mkinga, Martin White and Diana Wilon

=== TV shows ===
Year	Show/series	Role	Notes/Cast
2021-2022	JQ Knew That	Nhwale	With Jane Marsh, Dennis Cockrum, Nil Günal and Petlan Ghall
Since 2019	The Real Past with Josephs Quartzy	Host/Presenter	A Talk show
2021	Big Brother (NAGWA)	DOS	With Hamilton Wiliam, Burton richard, Adela Richard and Sophia Mwaipopo,
