= Madalena (2021 film) =

- Theatrical release poster
- Directed by: Madiano Marcheti
- Written by: Madiano Marcheti; Thiago Gallego; Thiago Coelho; Thiago Ortman
- Produced by: Marcos Pieri; Clélia Bessa; Joel Pizzini; Sérgio Pedrosa; Beatriz Martins
- Starring: Natalia Mazarim; Rafael de Bona; Pamella Yule
- Cinematography: Guilherme Tostes; Tiago Rios
- Edited by: Lia Kulakauskas
- Music by: Junior Marcheti
- Production companies: Raccord; PoloFilme; Viralata TV; Terceira Margem
- Distributed by: Vitrine Filmes
- Release dates: February 3, 2021 (IFFR); December 9, 2021 (Brazil)
- Running time: 85 minutes
- Country: Brazil
- Language: Portuguese

Madalena is a 2021 Brazilian crime drama film directed by Madiano Marcheti in his directorial debut. The screenplay was written by Marcheti in collaboration with Thiago Gallego, Thiago Coelho, and Thiago Ortman. The film was shot in Dourados, Mato Grosso do Sul.

== Plot ==
The corpse of Madalena, a trans woman, is found amidst a soybean crop in a rural town in Brazilian Central-West Region. Through flashbacks, the film then chronicles about three people connected to Madalena: Luziane, a suburban girl, daughter of a seamstress; Cristiano, son of a big farmer and a Senate candidate politician; and Bianca, a trans woman and close friend to Madalena.

== Cast ==
- Natalia Mazarim as Luziane
- Rafael de Bona as Cristiano
- Pamella Yule as Bianca
- Chloe Milan as Madalena

== Release ==
During its production, Madalena was screened in the category "Working in Progress" at the 2019 San Sebastián International Film Festival. By December 2020, it was chosen for the next year International Film Festival Rotterdam's line-up. The film premiered on February 3, 2021 at the 50th International Film Festival Rotterdam. Its general release in Brazil occurred on December 9, 2021, although some previous screenings were held in Rio de Janeiro on December 7.

== Reception ==
The review aggregator website Rotten Tomatoes reports an 83% approval rating based on 6 reviews, with an average rating of 7.5/10.
