= The Year Before the War =

- Theatrical release poster
- Directed by: Dāvis Sīmanis
- Written by: Tabita Rudzāte; Dāvis Sīmanis; Uldis Tīrons
- Produced by: Roberts Vinovskis
- Starring: Petr Buchta
- Cinematography: Andrejs Rudzāts
- Edited by: Anna Ryndová
- Music by: Faustas Latenas
- Production companies: Produkce Radim Procházka; Locomotive Productions; Studio Uljana Kim
- Distributed by: Locomotive Productions
- Release dates: February 5, 2021 (IFFR); April 15, 2022 (Latvia)
- Running time: 95 minutes
- Countries: Latvia; Czech Republic; Lithuania
- Languages: Latvian; German; French; Russian

The Year Before the War (Latvian: Gads pirms kara) is a 2021 surrealist historical thriller film co-written and directed by Dāvis Sīmanis. It is about the journey across Europe of Peter Piaktow, a foreign Latvian anarchist. It is a co-production between Latvia, the Czech Republic and Lithuania.

== Synopsis ==
Shortly before the outbreak of World War I, Latvian anarchist Peter the Painter attempts to unravel a conspiracy by traveling across Europe and meeting with communist leaders.

== Cast ==
- Petr Buchta as Peter Piaktow
- Rūdolfs Apse as Broz Tito
- Lauris Dzelzītis as Lenin
- Gints Grāvelis as Trotsky
- Eduards Johansons as Stalin
- Edgars Kaufelds as Hitler
- Ģirts Ķesteris as Freud
- Daniel Sidon as Franz Kafka
- Inga Siliņa as Alma
- Igors Jakimenko as Lackey with a chair at the hotel

== Production ==
Principal photography began in January 2019 and wrapped in late January 2020. Filming took place on location in Pļaviņas, Cinevilla, Riga, Sloka and Talsi, as well as in Prague.

== Release ==
The Year Before the War had its world premiere on February 5, 2021, at the 50th International Film Festival Rotterdam, then screened on October 21, 2021, at the 8th Riga International Film Festival, on November 5, 2021, at the 29th International Film Festival of the Art of Cinematography Camerimage, and on November 26, 2021, at the 25th Tallinn Black Nights Film Festival.

The film was commercially released on April 15, 2022, in Latvian theaters.

== Accolades ==
Year	Award / Festival	Category	Recipient	Result	Ref.
2021	50th International Film Festival Rotterdam	Big Screen Award	The Year Before the War	Nominated	
2021	8th Riga International Film Festival	Best Film	The Year Before the War	Nominated	
2022	Latvian National Film Festival	Best Film	The Year Before the War	Won	
2022	Latvian National Film Festival	Best Director	Dāvis Sīmanis	Nominated	
2022	Latvian National Film Festival	Best Actor	Petr Buchta	Won	
2022	Latvian National Film Festival	Best Supporting Actor	Lauris Dzelzitis	Won	
2022	Latvian National Film Festival	Best Screenplay	Dāvis Sīmanis, Tabita Rudzate & Uldis Tirons	Won	
2022	Latvian National Film Festival	Best Cinematography	Andrejs Rudzats	Won	
2022	Latvian National Film Festival	Best Editing	Anna Ryndová	Nominated	
2022	Latvian National Film Festival	Best Costume Design	Kristine Jurjane	Nominated	
2022	Latvian National Film Festival	Best Production Design	Kristine Jurjane	Won	
2022	Latvian National Film Festival	Best Sound	Saulius Urbanavicius	Won	
