= P. S. Vinothraj =

Indian film director and screenwriter (born 1988)

- Born: P.S Vinothraj; 18 June 1988 (age 38)
- Occupation: Film director Screenwriter

P. S. Vinothraj (born 18 June 1988) is an Indian film director and a screenwriter. He wrote and directed the Tamil film, Pebbles (Koozhangal) which is also his debut film. Pebbles was screened at the 50th International Film Festival Rotterdam held in Netherlands on 4 February 2021, where it received the Tiger Award at the festival. It is the second Indian film to win this award. It was selected as the Indian entry for the Best International Feature Film at the 94th Academy Awards, but was not nominated.

== Early life ==
Vinothraj's father died when Vinothraj was in class 4. He had to drop out of school and work in the flower markets of Madurai as a daily wage labourer. He went to Tiruppur at the age of 14 to work there in one of the town's textile factories. He joined a tutorial college and studied there for a couple of years. Eventually, seeing his fellow co-workers have their lives destroyed, he decided to leave the place and go to Chennai and work in cinema.

== Film career ==
Vinothraj was fascinated with cinema after seeing a film shooting when he was a child. In Chennai he got a job as an employee at a DVD shop. He worked there for five years and during that time he used to talk to various film directors and assistant directors and others working in cinema. He watched a lot of films, especially foreign films. He doesn't understand English and could not understand the subtitles in foreign language films, so eventually, he started watching visually-striking films that he could understand without subtitles.

He got work as an assistant director in some short films in the Nalaiya Iyakkunar TV Program using the contacts he got from working in the DVD shop. Later, he met A. Sarkunam, the Tamil film director whose films include Kalavani and Vaagai Sooda Vaa. He then went on to work as an assistant director in the Tamil feature film Manjapai (2013), directed by Raghavan and produced by Sarkunam. After working in that film, he felt he needed to learn more and so, he joined the post-modernistic theatre troupe Manal Magudi and worked there as an assistant director for two years.

Vinothraj made a short film, Subway, at this time on a shoe-string budget. The idea for Pebbles was based on what his sister told him about her treatment by her husband. Her family could not pay a dowry, so her husband threw her out and she had to walk almost 13 kilometres to her mother's house. The film was produced by Learn and Teach Productions. Vinothraj, along with his team, shot the film in around 37 days in the peak hours of sunlight during the noon as he wanted to capture the heat of the landscape.

== Filmography ==
Key
†	Denotes films that have not yet been released

Year	Title
2021	Pebbles
2024	The Adamant Girl

== Awards and honours ==
Pebbles
Award	Category	Result	Ref
International Film Festival of Rotterdam	Tiger Award (Best Film)	Won	
Academy Awards	Best International Feature	India's official entry	
Film Independent Spirit Awards	Best International Feature	Nominated	
ShorTS International Film Festival	Premio SNCCI (Jury Prize)	Won	
Transilvania International Film Festival	Special Jury Award	Won	
Golden Apricot International Film Festival	Golden Apricot Award (Best Film Award)	Won	
Singapore International Film Festival	Best Director Award	Won	
Dhaka International Film Festival	Best Film Award	Won	
Black Movie Independent International Film Festival	People's Jury Award	Won	
Asian Film Awards	Best New Director	Nominated	
Asia Pacific Screen Awards	Achievement in Direction	Nominated	
International Film Festival of Kerala	NETPAC Award, Special Jury Prize, Audience Award	Won	
