= Jocelyne Saab =

Lebanese film director and journalist (1948–2019)

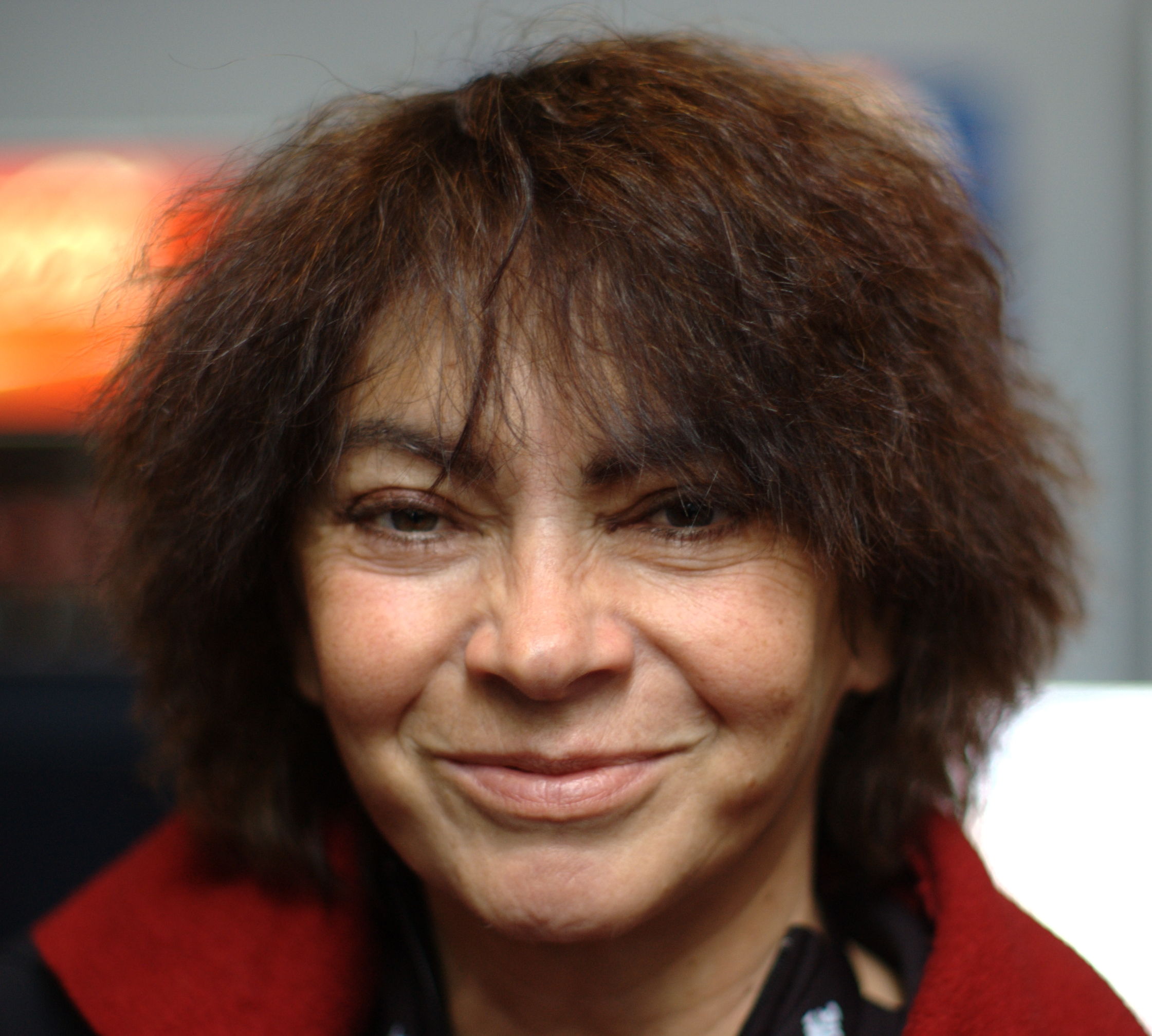
- Jocelyne Saab during Vesoul International Asian film festival, 2009.
- Born: 30 April 1948; Beirut, Lebanon
- Died: 7 January 2019 (aged 70); Paris, France
- Occupations: Film director, journalist
- Notable work: A Suspended Life; Once Upon a Time: Beirut; Kiss Me Not on the Eyes

Jocelyne Saab (30 April 1948 – 7 January 2019) was a Lebanese journalist and film director. She is recognized as one of the pioneers of Lebanese cinema. A reporter, photographer, scriptwriter, producer, director, artist and founder of the Cultural Resistance International Film Festival of Lebanon, Saab focused on the deprived and disadvantaged – from displaced peoples to exiled fighters, cities at war and a Fourth World without a voice. Her work is grounded in historic violence, and in an awareness of the actions and images required to document, reflect on and counteract it.

== Career ==
Saab was born and raised in Beirut. She studied economic at Beirut’s Saint-Joseph University and then in Paris. In the 1970s, she began to work occasionally for television. Her first job was hosting a pop music program on the national Lebanese radio station called "Marsupilami got blue eyes." She next worked with Etel Adnan for As-Safa newspaper. She then became a television newsreader. Saab was also a war correspondent in Egypt and South Lebanon. She went to Libya in 1971 and covered the October War in 1973. In 1975 she worked as a reporter for French television.

When the Lebanese Civil War broke out, Saab began making documentary films. Her first documentary was called Lebanon in Turmoil. After two years, she stopped doing 'classical' documentaries and began to give her documentaries a more personal perspective. This marked her turn towards a more personal and essayistic mode of filmmaking, as her country was torn apart by conflict. As a curator at Birkbeck, University of London noted: "These beautiful and moving films infuse their powerful documentary footage of daily life amid destruction and displacement with a poetic intensity that transcends the conflict and reaches beyond despair."

After the civil war, Saab continued to make films, in both documentary and fiction formats. She travelled the world with her film Kiss Me Not on the Eyes, which was selected for Sundance, Toronto and many Asian festivals. The film was banned in Egypt shortly before the premiere, Saab received death threats from fundamentalists.

Saab became part of the Network for the Promotion of Asian Cinema (NETPAC). She created the Cultural Resistance International Film Festival of Lebanon in 2013 to promote Asian cinema in Lebanon. She launched the festival in five Lebanese cities, with the intention of promoting peace and understanding.

During her last years, she pursued video art. She released 3 short videos as part of bigger projects. One Dollar a Day was also a photo exhibition. A short film My Name Is Mei Shigenobu was made when Saab was already ill, it became her last project. Initially, she planned to make a full-scale feature entitled Shigenobu: Mother and Daughter about Fusako and Mei Shigenobu, but due to her weak condition, Saab managed to organize only a quick shoot for Mei. My Name Is Mei Shigenobu was completed 10 days before Jocelyne Saab's passing.

== Filmography ==
=== TV reportages ===
- 1970 : The Lebanese House (unavailable)
- 1970 : Bombing in a Palestinian Neighborhood (unavailable)
- 1973 : Kadhafi: The Green March (10 min)
- 1973 : Kadhafi, The Man Who Comes from Desert (60 min)
- 1973 : Portrait of Kadhafi (5 min)
- 1973 : Special Middle East: Israel (26 min)
- 1973 : October War (8 min)
- 1973 : Middle East: Egypt (8 min)
- 1973 : War in Orient: Egypt (8 min)
- 1974 : Palestinian Keep Fighting (10 min)
- 1974 : Golan, on the Front Line (10 min)
- 1974 : Irak, War in Kurdistan (16 min)
- 1982 : Lebanese Hostages of Their City (6 min)
- 1982 : Lebanon: State of Shock (6 min)

=== Documentary ===
- 1973 : Palestinian Women
- 1974 : The Rejection Front
- 1975 : Lebanon in Turmoil
- 1975 : New Crusader in Orient
- 1976 : Children of War
- 1976 : South Lebanon, History of a Sieged Village
- 1976 : Beirut, Never Again
- 1976 : For a Few Lives
- 1977 : Sahara Is Not for Sale
- 1978 : Egypt the City of the Deaths
- 1979 : Letter from Beirut
- 1980 : Iran, Utopia in Motion
- 1982 : Beirut My City
- 1982 : The Ship of Exile
- 1986 : The Architect of Luxor
- 1986 : Phantoms of Alexandria
- 1986 : Copts: Pharaohs' Cross
- 1986 : Allah's Love
- 1988 : The Woman Killer
- 1989 : Al'Alma', Belly
- 1991 : Fecondation in video
- 1997 : The Lady of Saigon
- 2016 : Imaginary Postcards
- 2016 : One Dollar a Day
- 2018 : My Name Is Mei Shigenobu

=== Fiction ===
- 1985 : A Suspended Life (Ghazal el-Banat)
- 1994 : Once Upon a Time: Beirut, the History of a Star
- 2005 : Dunia, Kiss Me Not on the Eyes
- 2009 : What's Going On?

== Installation ==
- 2006 : Strange Games and Bridges (Dubai Art Fair; Singapore National Museum )
- 2011 : Le Jardin de la guerre (Les Halles de Saerbeck, Bruxelles)
- 2013 : Café du Genre (MuCEM, Marseille)
- 2017 : One Dollar A Day (Institut Culturel Français, Istanbul/Beyrouth; DEPO Istanbul)

== Book ==
Jocelyne Saab published a book of photography, just before she died. Zones de guerre (ISBN 978-2351372555) follows her whole career through stills and photographs from her films and work.

== Awards ==
- Nomination for Grand Prix des Amériques Dunia 2005
- Nomination for the Grand Jury Prize of the Sundance Film Festival 2006
