= Accidental Luxuriance of the Translucent Watery Rebus =

- Directed by: Dalibor Barić
- Written by: Dalibor Barić
- Produced by: Ivan Katić
- Starring: Rakan Rushaidat, Ana Vilenica, Frano Mašković, Nikša Marinović, Mario Kovač, Željka Veverec, Boris Bakal, Pavlica Brazzoduro Bajsić
- Cinematography: Dalibor Barić
- Music by: Dalibor Barić
- Production company: Kaos
- Release date: June 15, 2020 (Annecy)
- Running time: 81 minutes

Accidental Luxuriance of the Translucent Watery Rebus (Croatian: Slučajna raskoš prozirnog vodenog rebusa) is a 2020 animated film by Croatian director Dalibor Barić, shortlisted for the 2021 Satellite Awards in the Motion Picture, Animated or Mixed Media category and submitted to the 2021 Academy Award for Best Animated Feature.

== Plot ==
Conceptual artist Sarah alongside friend Martin trying to fight the system joining a revolutionary commune while Inspector Ambroz and the police are on their trail.

== Production and release ==
The techniques used in the film include rotoscoping, collage, and found footage. Barić took care of many parts of the films's creation himself, including direction, scripting, animation, composition, soundtrack, and editing. The film had a budget of €20,000.

The film was initially shown in ten Croatian arthouse cinemas and screened at the Zagreb Museum of Contemporary Art in 2020. In order to qualify for the Academy Awards, it was also shown at Laemmle in early 2021. The film's general release was Video on Demand on Vimeo.

== Reception ==
In the Los Angeles Times, Carlos Agulilar described the film as "A surrealist noir film resembling the retro futurism of Alphaville," and in Variety, reviewer Michael Nordine described the film as "vibrant and alive in a way that few films falling under the wide umbrella of animation even attempt to be." Peter Bradshaw, in a four-star review for The Guardian, referred to it as a "distinctly disturbing and even absorbing" reverie, stating that there is "something impressive in the film’s indifference to narrative meaning or ordinary legibility." On Rotten Tomatoes, the film holds a score of 80% based on five reviews.
