= The Dog Who Wouldn't Be Quiet =

2021 drama film

- Sundance release poster
- Spanish: El perro que no calla
- Directed by: Ana Katz
- Written by: Ana Katz; Gonzalo Delgado
- Produced by: Laura Huberman; Ana Katz; Ramiro Pavón; Pablo Ingercher
- Starring: Daniel Katz; Julieta Zylberberg; Valeria Lois; Mirella Pascual; Carlos Portaluppi
- Cinematography: Gustavo Biazzi; Fernando Blanc; Marcelo Lavintman; Joaquín Neira; Guillermo Nieto
- Edited by: Andrés Tambornino
- Production company: Laura Cine - Oh my Gómez!
- Distributed by: Luxbox
- Release date: January 30, 2021 (Sundance)
- Running time: 73 minutes
- Country: Argentina
- Language: Spanish

The Dog Who Wouldn't Be Quiet (Spanish: El perro que no calla) is a 2021 Argentine absurdist drama film directed by Ana Katz and written by Gonzalo Delgado with Katz. The film stars Daniel Katz, Julieta Zylberberg, Valeria Lois, Mirella Pascual and Carlos Portaluppi.

The film had its world premiere at the 2021 Sundance Film Festival on January 30, 2021.

== Premise ==
Sebas, an illustrator approaching middle age, experiences a number of bittersweet life changes inspired by absurd events, including a silent dog inexplicably judged by neighbors and co-workers to be deafening, and the arrival of a meteor that permanently poisons all of Earth's atmosphere above four feet off the ground.

== Cast ==
The cast include:

- Daniel Katz as Seba
- Julieta Zylberberg
- Valeria Lois
- Mirella Pascual
- Carlos Portaluppi

== Release ==
The film had its premiere in the 2021 Sundance Film Festival on January 30, 2021 in the World Cinema Dramatic Competition section.

== Reception ==
On the review aggregator website Rotten Tomatoes, 100% of 30 critics' reviews are positive, with an average rating of 7.2/10. Metacritic, which uses a weighted average, assigned the film a score of 81 out of 100, based on 8 critics, indicating "universal acclaim".

It won the VPRO Big Screen Award at the 50th International Film Festival Rotterdam, and the Havana Star Prize for Best Screenplay at the 21st Havana Film Festival New York.
