= Tiong Bahru Social Club =

2020 Singaporean comedy-drama film

- Directed by: Tan Bee Thiam
- Written by: Antti Toivonen, Tan Bee Thiam
- Starring: yao; Guat Kian Goh; Jalyn Han
- Production companies: Tiger Tiger Pictures; Bert Pictures; 13 Little Pictures
- Distributed by: Golden Village Pictures
- Release dates: 26 November 2020 (Singapore Film Festival); 10 December 2020
- Running time: 88 minutes
- Country: Singapore
- Languages: English; Mandarin; Hokkien; Cantonese; Malay; Tamil
- Box office: S$108,774

Tiong Bahru Social Club (Chinese: 中峇鲁俱乐部) is a 2020 Singaporean satirical black comedy art film. The film tells the story of a simple everyman who accidentally becomes a happiness agent in Tiong Bahru Social Club, an idyllic artificial intelligence cult-like community dedicated to bringing joy and happiness by using big data which aims to become the happiest neighborhood in town.

It was released on 10 December 2020 in Singaporean cinemas.

== Synopsis ==
After being fired from his job, 30-year-old Ah Bee then signs up as a young Happiness Agent with Tiong Bahru Social Club, an idyllic planned community project dedicated to spreading happiness by providing data and user experiences to build the happiest neighborhood in an aging Singaporean district. Ah Bee is appointed to join the club until he finds himself in a strange cult of happiness and technology where society has embraced artificial intelligence that will allow them to help people learn what to do based on big data, share their interactions to raise their social status, and even match their lovers. He moves into the communal house where he is tasked with taking care of an elderly aunt, and he even meets up with a girl. Things seem to look brighter and better, but he soon realizes that something is going wrong. How will his story go?

== Cast ==
- Yao (Note: formerly known as Thomas Pang. His current name is styled as 'yao'.) as Ah Bee
- Guat Kian Goh as Mui
- Jalyn Han as Miss Wee
- Benjamin Lee as Uncle Mok
- Noorlinah Mohamed as Haslinna
- Jo Tan as Geok
- Munah Bagharib as Orked
- Mochi
- Imran Shafie as Happiness Agent

== Production ==
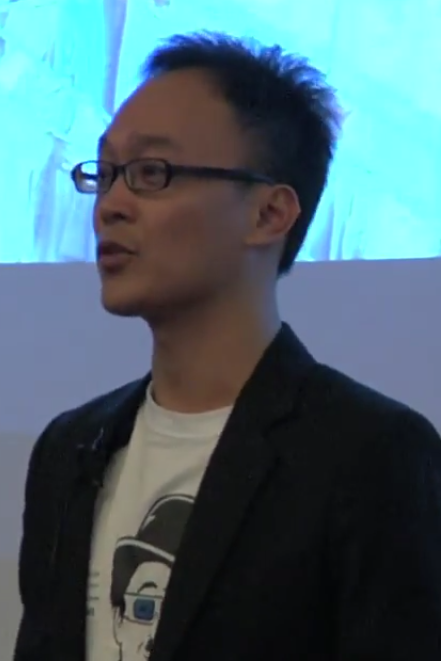
Director Tan Bee Thiam in 2011

The film is Tan Bee Thiam's solo directorial debut. He previously co-directed local indie films Fundamentally Happy (2015) with Lei Yuan Bin, and produced Snakeskin (2015) and As You Were (2014).

== Release ==
The film served as the opening film at the 2020 Singapore International Film Festival on 26 November 2020.

The film was invited for a screening at the 20th New York Asian Film Festival. It was featured in Uncaged Award for Best Feature Film Competition section and screened at Lincoln Center and SVA Theatre in the two-week festival held from 6 to 22 August 2021 in New York.

== See also ==
- Bigbug, 2022 science fiction film with a similar theme
- "Dot and Bubble", an episode of Doctor Who with similar theme
- Down and Out in the Magic Kingdom, 2003 science fiction novel with a similar theme
- Men, Women & Children, 2014 film with a similar theme
- "Majority Rule", an episode of The Orville with similar theme.
- "Nosedive", an episode of television series Black Mirror which also has similar theme
