= Kiss Me Not on the Eyes =

Dunia (Kiss Me Not on the Eyes)
- poster of Dunia ilm
- Directed by: Jocelyne Saab
- Screenplay by: Jocelyne Saab
- Produced by: Collection d’Artiste
- Starring: Hanan Tork; Mohamed Mounir; Aida Riad; Fathi Abdel Wahab
- Cinematography: Jacques Bouquin
- Edited by: Claude Reznik
- Music by: Jean-Pierre Mas, Patrick Legonie
- Release date: 2005
- Running time: 110'
- Countries: Egypt; France; Libya; Morocco

Dunia (English title: Kiss Me Not on the Eyes) is a 2005 Egyptian film directed by Jocelyne Saab and starring Hanan Tork and Mohamed Mounir. It premiered at the 2005 Cairo International Film Festival.

== Synopsis ==
Student of Sufi poetry and belly dance in Cairo, Dunia is looking for herself and wishes to become a professional dancer. During casting for a dance contest, she meets the illustrious and charming Dr Bechir, a Sufi thinker and writer. With him, Dunia will discover not only the pleasure of words through Sufi poetry, but also the pleasure of the senses. However, she will have to confront tradition, which destroyed her capacity to feel pleasure, in order to free her body and dance with her soul.

== Release and reception ==
Shortly before the Egyptian premiere, the film was banned by the authorities. Saab received death threats from fundamentalists.

== Awards ==
- Cairo International Film Festival 2005 (Honorable Award)
- Algarve International Film Festival 2006 (International Jury Award: Best Film)
- Fribourg 2006
- Milan 2006
- Singapur 2006
