= Africa (2019 film) =

2019 film

- Film poster
- Directed by: Oren Gerner
- Written by: Oren Gerner
- Produced by: Itay Akirav
- Cinematography: Adi Mozes
- Edited by: Gil Vesely
- Production company: Film Harbor
- Release date: 8 September 2019 (TIFF)
- Running time: 82 minutes
- Country: Israel
- Language: Hebrew

Africa is a 2019 independent Israeli drama film written and directed by Oren Gerner, starring his parents, Meir and Maya Gerner.

The film premiered at the 2019 Toronto International Film Festival and Haifa Film Festival, where it won three awards: Best Film, Best Debut Film, and Best Actor. It was later nominated for the Ophir Award for Best Film.

== Plot ==
Meir (Meir Garner), a retiree living in a picturesque village with his wife Mya (Mya Garner), discovers that the responsibility for organizing the community's annual celebration has been handed over to someone else. This task had been his for thirty years, and Meir struggles to cope with the loss of relevance thrust upon him. He embarks on a quiet struggle to regain a sense of vitality in his life.

== Cast ==
- Maya Gerner as Maya
- Meir Gerner as Meir
- Oren Gerner as Oren
