= The Truth (2019 film) =

2019 film by Hirokazu Koreeda

- Theatrical release poster
- French: La Vérité
- Directed by: Hirokazu Kore-eda
- Written by: Hirokazu Kore-eda
- Produced by: Muriel Merlin
- Starring: Catherine Deneuve; Juliette Binoche; Ethan Hawke; Ludivine Sagnier; Clémentine Grenier; Manon Clavel; Alain Libolt; Christian Crahay; Roger Van Hool
- Cinematography: Éric Gautier
- Edited by: Hirokazu Kore-eda
- Music by: Alexeï Aïgui
- Production companies: 3B Productions; Bunbuku; MI Movies; France 3 Cinema; Cine+; Canal+; Ciné+; Wild Bunch; CNC
- Distributed by: GAGA (Japan); Le Pacte (France)
- Release dates: 28 August 2019 (Venice); 11 October 2019 (Japan); 25 December 2019 (France)
- Running time: 106 minutes
- Countries: France; Japan
- Languages: French; English
- Box office: $5.2 million

The Truth (French: La Vérité) is a 2019 drama film written, directed and edited by Hirokazu Kore-eda. It stars Catherine Deneuve, Juliette Binoche, Ethan Hawke, Ludivine Sagnier, Clémentine Grenier, Manon Clavel, Alain Libolt, Christian Crahay and Roger Van Hool. It is Kore-eda's first film set outside Japan and not in his native language.

The film had its world premiere at the 76th Venice International Film Festival on 28 August 2019. It was released in Japan on 11 October 2019, by GAGA Pictures, and in France on 25 December 2019, by Le Pacte.

== Plot ==
Fabienne Dangeville is a very famous French actress, giving an interview about work on her upcoming book. Her daughter, screenwriter Lumir, son-in-law actor Hank and granddaughter Charlotte arrive for her book launch. Lumir is surprised that the book has already been printed, as she expected to read it and approve content about her first, before publishing. Fabienne tells her that she sent her a manuscript to New York (though it is unclear if it is a lie, or it merely never delivered). Later that night, Lumir reads her mother's book and annotates it.

Next day, Lumir confronts Fabienne about some lines in the book which depict her relationship with her mother as a fairy tale fabrication. Fabienne was very rarely there for Lumir as a child. Lumir also asks why she does not mention Sarah once in her book (Sarah Mondavan, being Fabienne's best friend, an accomplished actress in her own right, whom Fabienne betrayed), Fabienne simply replies it's her book her choice, that nobody reading it would want to know the truth, because being a famous actress, her fans would find the truth uninteresting. Later, Luc, Fabienne's manager, tells Lumir that Fabienne accepted her current film role only because it stars Manon Lenoir, the next big actress who reminds everyone of Sarah Mondavan. The film "Memories of My Mother" is a science fiction dealing with themes of time and ageing.

Lumir goes to the film set, acting as Fabienne's assistant, and watches the film shoot. The film-within-a-film is about a mother who is dying, so she goes to live in space to arrest her aging and slow the effects of her terminal illness. She returns to Earth every seven years to visit her daughter, who gets older and older with each visit, whilst her mother remains youthful. Fabienne plays the daughter in her seventies. During a read-through rehearsal of the script, the room seems very impressed with Manon's talent, but Fabienne seems annoyed and threatened, believing Manon is being pretentious by overacting. Later, Luc tells Fabienne that Manon reminds him of Sarah Mondavan, while Lumir agrees and says they have the same sounding husky voice.

Annoyed with Fabienne, Luc informs her that he plans to retire and go live with his son's family. Fabienne is surprised to be reminded that Luc had so many grandchildren. Lumir asks him why he is leaving, and he says that Fabienne didn't mention him even once in her memoir as if he never existed. He tells Lumir that she can manage Fabienne as they would make a good team. Pierre, Lumir's father and Fabienne's ex-husband, surprises everyone by arriving at the house. Lumir quickly surmises he wants money, which he thinks he deserves for Fabienne publishing a book including him. Lumir tells him that the book's single mentions of him is he being dead.

Fabienne's current husband, Jacques, makes dinner for the whole family, including Pierre. When Pierre congratulates Hank on his acting successes, Fabienne downplays Hank's TV career, and very casually insults his acting ability while doing so as mere imitation. To get back at her mother for hurting Hank's feelings, Lumir abruptly brings up how Fabienne stole the award-winning role from Sarah by sleeping with the director, and that Sarah's suicide was Fabienne's fault. Fabienne insists that Sarah's death was an accident, in that she drowned while swimming after having drunk too much. Lumir still misses Sarah as she was kind. Fabienne says she should have been Sarah's daughter and she'd rather be a bad mother and bad friend and a good actress. Upset at her mother's insensitivity, Lumir leaves the table in tears. Hank, who had quit drinking, gets drunk with his mother-in-law.

The next day, while shooting scenes with Manon and feeling threatened, Fabienne plays the complaining diva by messing up her lines and blaming being distracted by things, like ringing cell phones. During a later take she falls down, but then pulls out a great performance from it. Fabienne wants Luc back but doesn't know what to do. Lumir tells her to apologize, and Fabienne says that she's never apologized to a man before, then asks Lumir to write an appropriate apology script for her to memorize. Later, the family has dinner with Luc and his extended family, and Fabienne tells Luc that Lumir wants him back instead of apologizing using the script Lumir had written for her.

Back on the set, Fabienne panics over Manon's youth and obvious talent, and leaves the set saying she's quitting acting and that Manon is mocking her. Lumir stops her, asks her to just admit Manon is a better actress and to quit always wimping out. Out of pride, Fabienne returns to the set. She tells Lumir that she sees Sarah sometimes and thinks she would be better at acting if Sarah were watching her. She asks her daughter to watch her instead, and finishes her scenes in the film.

Lumir compliments her mother on her performance, and later Manon stops by to thank and compliment her as well. Fabienne admits that it was the kind of thing she would have done with Sarah, whom Manon reminds her of. She ends up giving Manon Sarah's favorite dress, which fits her perfectly. Manon asks Fabienne what Sarah was like, and she tells her how talented she was. Manon says the comparison being made between them is a burden. Fabienne asks why she doesn't try to be the new Fabienne, and Manon says that would be too heavy a weight, and they all laugh.

Fabienne admits to Lumir that she was jealous of Sarah, because her stealing a mere role and award from Sarah doesn't compare with Sarah's stealing her daughter's affections. Lumir asks her why that wasn't in her book, and Fabienne says maybe she will include it in the second edition. Lumir hugs her mother, cries and tells her she must truly have magical powers because she's on the verge of forgiving her. Fabienne then suddenly gets upset that she should have played the scene with Manon like this and thinking that it was a waste to not use these emotions in scene.

Charlotte goes to Fabienne and tells her that her greatest wish is to become an actress someday. Fabienne tells her magic is unnecessary for that to manifest, as she is her granddaughter. She tells Fabienne she wants her to go into a spaceship so that she can stop aging too, so she's able to watch her grow up to become an actress, which moves Fabienne. Charlotte then goes back to Lumir, and it's revealed it's a line that Lumir wrote for her to please her grandmother. Charlotte asks whether the sentiment is therefore real or not. Lumir, taken aback and unable to answer, simply smiles uneasily.

Luc returns to work, where Fabienne has Charlotte present him with her homemade medal as a silent apology. She asks him to have a reshoot scheduled for "Memories of My Mother", since she thinks she can act the scene better now. Lumir asks Luc if he really ever intended to leave, but he doesn't say. The family heads out together as Fabienne, in an exalted mood, notes that she loves Parisian winters.

== Cast ==
- Catherine Deneuve as Fabienne Dangeville
- Juliette Binoche as Lumir, Fabienne's daughter
- Ethan Hawke as Hank, Lumir's husband
- Ludivine Sagnier as Amy
- Clémentine Grenier as Charlotte
- Manon Clavel as Manon
- Alain Libolt as Luc Garbois
- Christian Crahay as Jacques
- Roger Van Hool as Pierre
- Laurent Capelluto as Journalist
- Maya Sansa
- Jackie Berroyer as The Chef

== Production ==
In July 2018, it was announced Catherine Deneuve, Juliette Binoche and Ethan Hawke would join the film's cast. It is Kore-eda's first film set outside Japan and not in his native language.

Production began in October 2018. Éric Gautier served as the film's cinematographer.

== Release ==
In January 2019, IFC Films and Curzon Artificial Eye acquired U.S. and U.K. distribution rights to the film. The film had its world premiere at the Venice Film Festival on 28 August 2019. It also screened at the Toronto International Film Festival on 9 September 2019.

It was scheduled to be released in the United States and United Kingdom on 20 March 2020. However, it was pulled from the schedule due to the COVID-19 pandemic.

== Reception ==
=== Critical response ===
On review aggregator Rotten Tomatoes, the film holds an approval rating of 87% based on 165 reviews, with an average rating of 7.2/10. The website's critics consensus reads: "The Truth may not stand with Hirokazu Kore-eda's best work, but it finds the writer-director revisiting familiar themes with a typically sensitive touch." Metacritic assigned the film a weighted average score of 71 out of 100, based on 13 critics, indicating "generally favorable reviews".
