= Pebbles (film) =

2021 film

- Poster
- Directed by: P. S. Vinothraj
- Screenplay by: P. S. Vinothraj; Vignesh Kumulai
- Produced by: Vignesh Shivan; Nayanthara; Sai Devanand S
- Starring: Chellapandi; Karuththadaiyaan
- Cinematography: Vignesh Kumulai; Jeya Parthipan
- Edited by: Ganesh Siva
- Music by: Yuvan Shankar Raja
- Production companies: Rowdy Pictures; Learn and Teach Production
- Release date: 4 February 2021 (IFFR)
- Running time: 75 minutes
- Country: India
- Language: Tamil

Pebbles (Tamil: Koozhangal) is a 2021 Indian Tamil-language drama film directed by debutant P. S. Vinothraj. The film was produced by Vignesh Shivan and Nayanthara under the Rowdy Pictures banner and Co-Produced by Learn and Teach Production Featuring music composed by Yuvan Shankar Raja, the film had cinematography handled by Jeya Parthipan and Vignesh Kumulai and was edited by Ganesh Siva.

Pebbles was screened at the 50th International Film Festival Rotterdam held in Netherlands on 4 February 2021, where it received the Tiger Award at the festival. It was selected as the Indian entry for the Best International Feature Film at the 94th Academy Awards, but was not nominated. and was also screened at the 52nd International Film Festival of India in 'Indian Panorama' section, feature film category.

The central theme of the movie is about retrieval. A father seeks to retrieve his wife. The son who accompanies him seeks to retain his childhood. The mother who remains unseen in the movie seeks to retrieve some water.

== Plot ==
An angry man barges into a school to retrieve his son. He takes the boy out of school and they get on a bus to the neighboring village. It turns out that the mother left them and went back to her mother's house and that is where the son and father are headed. When the pair reaches the village it turns out that the mother left early in the morning back to her husband's house. The husband fights with his wife's family and threatens to kill the wife upon going back to his house. The son tears up the paper money they have to prevent the father from going back by bus. So they walk back towards their village in the afternoon heat. During the walk the son loses a few things and finds a few things such as a pebble and a puppy. The father comes across certain elements that he can't explain. It makes him question his own mortality and dents his bravado. By the time they reach home the father is worn out. The father learns that the mother has gone to fetch water. He sits down to eat that which his wife has prepared for him. The son lets his baby sister play with his new puppy and places the new pebble on top of his collections of pebbles.

== Cast ==
- Chellapandi as Velu
- Karuththadaiyaan as Ganapathy

== Production ==
The story of the film is based on a real incident of director Vinothraj's family which inspired him to direct the film. Vinoth stated that he spent a lot of time looking for an arid landscape, which was required for the story and was finally found in Arittapati, near Melur in Madurai. The whole film was shot at Arittapati in 30 days. The mountains in the 13 villages where the film was shot are thousands of years old and the villages which Vinoth explored, as a part of the story, too developed on its own. The biggest challenge of shooting the film is mostly the humid weather, for which he stated that "As sunlight was crucial for the story, we would start shooting every day after 10am and wind up by 3pm. We would watch the rushes in the evening and that would give us the motivation for the next day."

== Reception ==
On the review aggregator website Rotten Tomatoes, 100% of 11 critics' reviews are positive, with an average rating of 8.6/10.

S. Srivatsan of The Hindu wrote in his review stating "There has never been a Tamil film that has captured the vastness of rural life in a more austere, art-house fashion. PS Vinothraj knows what are all the basics of filmmaking that is lacking, even in the works of celebrated filmmakers." Baradwaj Rangan wrote for Film Companion South, "Despite the many tragedies in the scenario (both natural and man-made), the film doesn't beg for our sympathies. Only at the very end do we feel a twinge."

== Accolades ==
Award	Date of ceremony	Category	Recipient(s)	Result	Ref(s)
Asian Film Awards	8 October 2021	Best New Director	P.S. Vinothraj	Nominated	
Asia Pacific Screen Awards	11 November 2021	Achievement in Directing	P.S. Vinothraj	Nominated	
Asia Pacific Screen Awards	11 November 2021	Achievement in Cinematography	Vignesh Kumulai and Jeya Parthipan	Nominated	
International Film Festival Rotterdam	22 June 2021	Tiger Award	P.S. Vinothraj	Won	
Independent Spirit Awards	6 March 2022	Best International Film	Pebbles	Nominated	
South Indian International Movie Awards	10th South Indian International Movie Awards	Best Debut Producer (Tamil)	Koozhangal	Nominated	

Pebbles was premiered at the 50th International Film Festival Rotterdam held in Netherlands on 4 February 2021. The film was officially selected at the North American premiere of New Directors New Films Festival which held on 28 April to 8 May, and also selected at the Jeonju International Film Festival held in South Korea from 29 April to 8 May. The film was also screened at the Indian Film Festival of Los Angeles held on 20 to 27 May, and at the Kyiv Molodist International Film Festival held from 29 May to 6 June. Pebbles is India's official entry to Oscars 2022. 14 films were shortlisted for this year's India's official entry to the Oscars 2022. Among the 14 films were Nayattu, Mandela, and Sardar Udham. Shaji N Karun, the chairperson of the 15-member selection committee watched the 14 films in Kolkata. Reportedly, the decision to select Pebbles for the Oscars 2022 was unanimous. However, the film was not nominated for the award.

== See also ==
- List of submissions to the 94th Academy Awards for Best International Feature Film
- List of Indian submissions for the Academy Award for Best International Feature Film
