= Chulayarnnon Siriphol =

Thai artist and filmmaker

Chulayarnnon Siriphol (Thai: จุฬญาณนนท์ ศิริผล; born 1986) is a Thai artist and filmmaker who employs moving images and his body as his main medium. Born in Bangkok, Thailand, he currently resides and works in the same city. He works across various genres, such as short films, performance video and video installations. Mixing local mythologies, Thai literature and science fiction, reflections on the body and spirituality serve to question contemporary culture and political ideology in Thailand and beyond with a mixture of sincerity and sarcasm. Recurring themes in his work are references to Thai literature and popular culture, such as the novel Behind the Painting (Thai: ข้างหลังภาพ) by Kulap Saipradit and a Golden Snail figure.

Chulayarnnon has received a Bachelor of Fine Arts from King Mongkut's Institute of Technology Ladkrabang and a Master of Fine Arts from Silpakorn University, both located in Bangkok, Thailand. His work has been included in large-scale international art exhibitions such as the Fukuoka Asian Art Triennale, the video and performance triennial Ghost:2561 and the Asian Art Biennial. His films have been screened at international film festivals and institutions, including Cannes Film Festival and Tate Modern.

== Notable works ==
=== Birth of Golden Snail (2018) ===
"Birth of Golden Snail" narrates a tale set at Khao Kha Nab Nam along the south bank seashore of Thailand, spanning from prehistoric times to World War II. Siriphol intentionally replicates the style of early black-and-white films and their screening formats, symbolizing the origins of both film and humanity—from the darkness of the maternal cave to the light of the external world. Shot on 16mm film against the backdrop of the Khao Khanab Nam cave in Krabi, Bangkok, the film was part of the Thailand Biennale Krabi 2018. However, it faced censorship and prohibition due to its perceived infringement of Thailand's social norms under Article 29 of the country's Film and Video Act of 2008.

"Birth of Golden Snail" incorporates both experimental and early silent film approaches, emphasizing the physicality of the film itself. This surreal movie delves into its own fragility by employing a fading film method that predates the era of sound in cinema.

=== ANG48 (2022) ===
The ANG48, also known as ANGSUMALIN 48, represents the fictional group 'Alliance of Nippon Girls 48'. It is a two-channel synchronized HD video installation. This film merges archival materials from various Asian film histories, constructing a sophisticated system of 48 digits embodied in a half-human, half-golden-snail form. The ANGSUMALIN 48 women play a pivotal role in fostering connections, fostering positive relationships, and offering support to empower Asian women across nations to confront and heal from historical traumas spanning from WWII, the Cold War, to the present day. The name of this system pays tribute to ANGSUMALIN, a fictional character from the Thai novel "Khu Kam" by Thommayanti, known for embodying traits of integrity, loyalty, and patriotism.

== Exhibitions and screenings ==
=== Group exhibitions ===
Shadow Dancing: Where Can We Find a Silver Lining in Challenging Times? 17 March - 12 June 2022, Jim Thompson Art Center, Bangkok, Thailand

=== Screenings ===
ANG48 - Exterior: The Science of Collective Consciousness, 5 April 2023, Tate Modern, London

== Award and honors ==
In 2004, Chulayarnnon Siriphol produced Hua-Lam-Pong, a brief documentary that follows an elderly man at a busy Bangkok train station as he sets up his camera on a tripod. Siriphol crafted this film during his high school years, and it received the Special White Elephant Award at the 8th Thai Short Film & Video Festival in the same year. Today, the documentary is featured in university film courses across Thailand.

In 2023, he was awarded a Silpa Bhirasri Creativity Grant, allowing him to further develop his Golden Snail oeuvre, resulting in the work How to explain "Monument to the Fourth International" to the Dead Golden Snail.
