= 74th Locarno Film Festival =

Film festival in Locarno, Switzerland

- Festival official poster
- Opening film: Beckett by Ferdinando Cito Filomarino
- Closing film: Respect by Liesl Tommy
- Location: Locarno, Switzerland
- Founded: 1946
- Awards: Golden Leopard; Seperti Dendam, Rindu Harus Dibayar Tuntas (Vengeance Is Mine, All Others Pay Cash) By Edwin
- Hosted by: Associazione Festival del film Locarno
- No. of films: Programmed: 209; World premieres: 100
- Festival date: Opening: 4 August 2021; Closing: 14 August 2021
- Website: 74 Locarno Film Festival

Locarno Film Festival
- 75th 73rd

The 74th annual Locarno Festival was held from 4 August to 14 August 2021 in Locarno, Switzerland. The opening film of the festival was Beckett by Ferdinando Cito Filomarino, which had its world premiere on 4 August. The 74th edition of Locarno Film Festival hosted 14 films including 7 world premieres in Piazza Grande among which half were European productions. More than 75,000 spectators attended the festival, half the attendance rate in 2019 before the COVID-19 pandemic.

The Golden Leopard, the festival's top prize, was awarded to Vengeance Is Mine, All Others Pay Cash directed by Edwin.

== Events ==
=== Rotonda by la Mobiliare - Come together! ===
This event was held from 30 July to 14 August. It is Locarno Film Festival's communal space, which embraces existing audience and greets new people. It had the following platforms:

- Art
- Virtual Reality
- Forum
- Talks
- Music
- Food and beverage
- Kids town
- Come together

=== Locarno Talks la Mobiliare ===
During the course of the film festival, it was a stage for exchanging and debating ideas and perspectives.

=== Cinema and Youth ===
This is an initiative open to 28 final year students of high school or vocational school of Switzerland and Northern Italy, aged between 18 and 23. They will be privileged viewers as they may watch the screenings, meet directors and actors/actresses, attend specially organized introductory lectures on film language. In addition they will have access to the sidebar events.

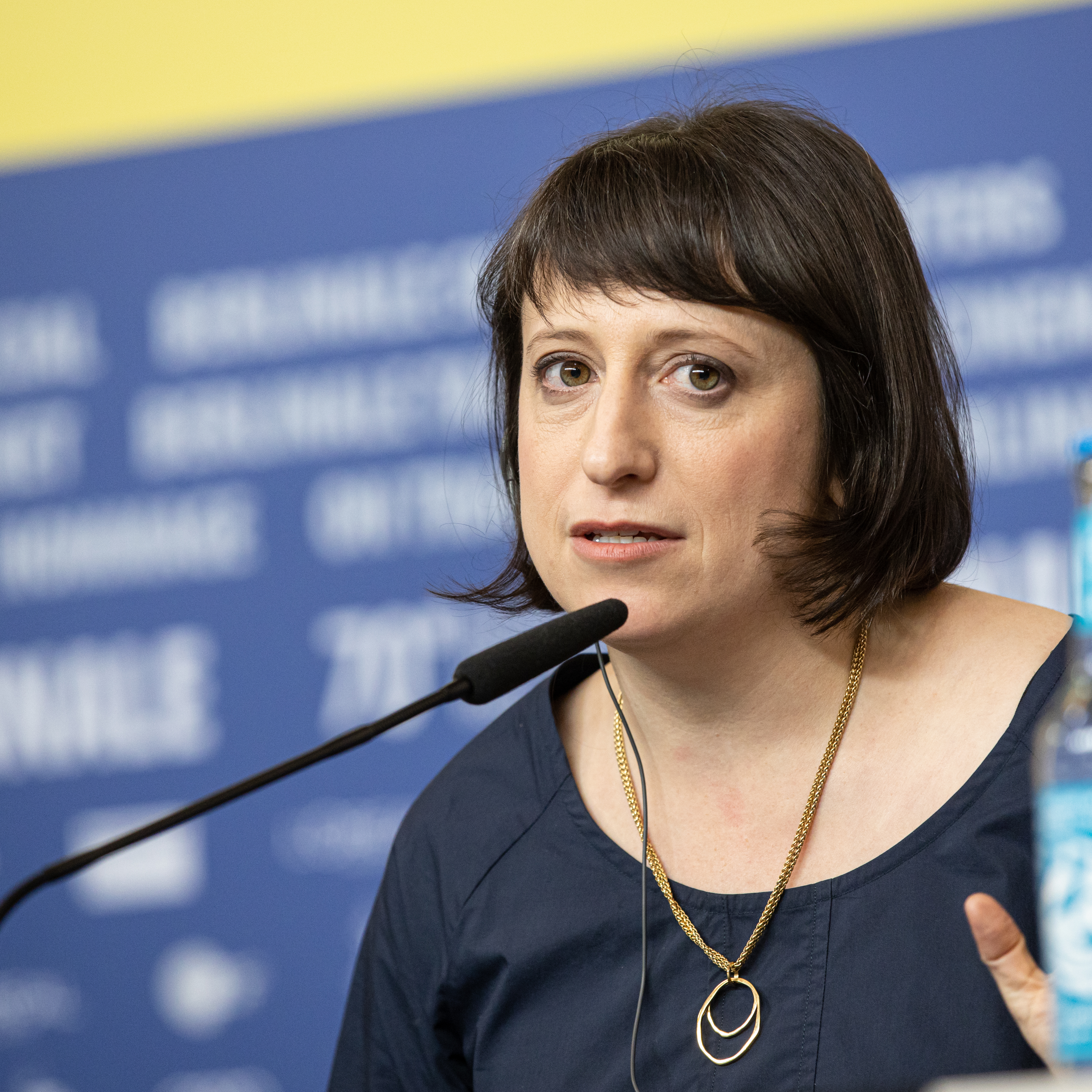
Eliza Hittman, international competition jury president

== Juries ==
=== International competition ===
- Eliza Hittman, American filmmaker (Jury President)
- Kevin Jerome Everson, American artist and filmmaker
- Philippe Lacôte, filmmaker from Ivory Coast
- Leonor Silveira, Portuguese actress
- Isabella Ferrari, Italian actress

=== Filmmakers of the present competition ===
- Agathe Bonitzer, French actress
- Mattie Do, Laotian American filmmaker
- Vanja Kaludjercic, festival director

=== Leopards of Tomorrow ===
- Kamal Aljafari, Palestinian filmmaker and artist
- Marie-Pierre Macia, French Producer
- Adina Pintilie (Romanian film director, screenwriter, visual artist and curator)

=== First Feature ===
- Amjad Abu Alala, Sudanese filmmaker
- Karina Ressler, Austrian editor
- Katharina Wyss, Switzerland filmmaker

== Sections ==
The following films were selected to receive screening in the sections below. It was Giona A. Nazzaro's first edition at the helm of the Locarno Film Festival as artistic director. The selection committee for feature films was composed by Pamela Biénzobas, Mathilde Henrot, Stefan Ivančić, Giovanni Marchini-Camia and Daniela Persico, with Eddie Bertozzi as an advisor for the competitive sections.

=== Pre-Festival ===
- LYNX by Laurent Geslin
- Tomorrow My Love by Gitanjali Rao

=== Piazza Grande ===
English title	Original title	Director(s)	Production country
Beckett (Opening Film)		Ferdinando Cito Filomarino	Italy
Free Guy		Shawn Levy	United States
Heat		Michael Mann	United States
Hinterland		Stefan Ruzowitzky	Austria, Luxembourg
Ida Red		John Swab	United States
Monte Verita		Stefan Jäger	Switzerland, Austria, Germany
National Lampoon's Animal House		John Landis	United States
Respect (Closing Film)		Liesl Tommy	United States, Canada
Rose		Aurélie Saada	France
Sinkhole	싱크홀	Kim Ji-hoon	South Korea
The Alleys		Bassel Ghandour	Jordan, Egypt, Saudi Arabia, Qatar
The Terminator		James Cameron	United States /United Kingdom
Vortex		Gaspar Noé	France, Belgium, Monaco
Yaya e Lennie – The Walking Liberty		Alessandro Rak	Italy

=== International competition (Concorso internazionale) ===
Highlighted title indicates Golden Leopard winner

English title	Original title	Director(s)	Production country
A New Old Play	椒麻堂會	Qiu Jiongjiong	Hong Kong, France
After Blue	Paradis Sale	Bertrand Mandico	France
Cop Secret	Leynilögga	Hannes Þór Halldórsson	Iceland
Gerda		Natalya Kudryashova	Russia
The Giants	I Giganti	Bonifacio Angius	Italy
Heaven Above	Nebesa	Srdjan Dragojević	Serbia, Germany, North Macedonia, Slovenia, Croatia, Montenegro, Bosnia & Herzegovina
Juju Stories		C.J. Obasi, Abba T. Makama, Michael Omonua	Nigeria, France
Luzifer		Peter Brunner	Austria
Medea		Alexander Zeldovich	Russia
The Odd-Job Men	Sis dies corrents	Neus Ballús	Spain
Petite Solange		Axelle Ropert	France
The River	Al Naher	Ghassan Salhab	Lebanon, France, Germany, Qatar
The Sacred Spirit	Espíritu sagrado	Chema García Ibarra	Spain, France, Turkey
Secret Name	La place d'une autre	Aurélia Georges	France
Soul of a Beast		Lorenz Merz	Switzerland
Vengeance Is Mine, All Others Pay Cash	Seperti Dendam, Rindu Harus Dibayar Tuntas	Edwin	Indonesia, Singapore, Germany
Zeros and Ones		Abel Ferrara	Italy, Germany, United States

=== Filmmakers of the Present (Concorso Cineasti del presente) ===
Highlighted title indicates winner

English title	Original title	Director(s)	Production country
Actual People		Kit Zauhar	United States
Holy Emy	Agia Emi	Araceli Lemos	Greece, France, USA
Public Toilet Africa	Amansa tiafi	Kofi Ofosu-Yeboah	Ghana
Brotherhood		Francesco Montagner	Czech Republic, Italy
Virgin Blue	Bu yao zai jian a, Yu hua tang	Niu Xiaoyu	China
The Legionnaire	Il Legionario	Hleb Papou	Italy, France
Whether the Weather Is Fine	Kun maupay man it panahon	Carlo Francisco Manatad	Philippines, France, Singapore, Indonesia, Germany, Qatar
Our Eternal Summer	L’été l’éternité	Émilie Aussel	France
My Brothers Dream Awake	Mis hermanos sueñan despiertos	Claudia Huaiquimilla	Chile
Mostro		José Pablo Escamilla	Mexico
No One's with the Calves	Niemand ist bei den Kälbern	Sabrina Sarabi	Germany
Shankar's Fairies		Irfana Majumdar	India
Streams		Mehdi Hmili	Tunisia, Luxembourg, France
Wet Sand		Elena Naveriani	Switzerland, Georgia
Zahorí		Marì Alessandrini	Switzerland, Argentina, Chile, France

=== Leopards of Tomorrow (Pardi di domani) ===
==== International competition (Concorso internazionale) ====
Highlighted title indicates winner

English title	Original title	Director(s)	Production country
The Infernal Machine	A Máquina Infernal	Francis Vogner Dos Reis	Brazil
And Then They Burn the Sea		Majid Al-Remaihi	Qatar
Suncatcher	Atrapaluz	Kim Torres	Costa Rica, Mexico
Christmas	Dōng dōng de shèng dàn jié	Fengrui Zhang	China, United States
FIRST TIME [The Time for All but Sunset - VIOLET]		Nicolaas Schmidt	Germany
Neon Phantom	Fantasma Neon	Leonardo Martinelli	Brazil
Playtime	Giochi	Simone Bozzelli	Italy
Home	Imuhira	Myriam Uwiragiye Birara	Rwanda
In Flow of Words		Eliane Esther Bots	Netherlands
Night	Layl	Ahmad Saleh	Germany, Qatar, Jordan, Palestine
The Demons of Dorothy	Les Démons de Dorothy	Alexis Langlois	France
Love, Dad	Milý tati	Diana Cam Van Nguyen	Czech Republic, Slovakia
Mask		Nava Rezvani	Iran
Dad's Sneakers	Papyni krosivky	Olha Zhurba	Ukraine
Sound of the Night	Somleng reatrey	Chanrado Sok, Kongkea Vann	Cambodia
Squish!		Tulapop Saenjaroen	Thailand, Singapore
Steakhouse		Špela Čadež	Slovenia, Germany, France
The Sunset Special		Nicolas Gebbe	Germany
Strawberry Cheesecake		Siyou Tan	Singapore
Time Flows in Strange Ways on Sundays	Yi yi	Giselle Lin	Singapore

==== National competition (Concorso nazionale) ====
Highlighted title indicates winner

English title	Original title	Director(s)	Production country
After a Room		Naomi Pacifique	United Kingdom, Netherlands, Switzerland
Dihya		Lucia Martinez Garcia	Switzerland
Dream Racing	Cavales	Juliette Riccaboni	Switzerland
Four Pills at Night		Leart Rama	Kosovo, Switzerland
It Must	Es muss	Flavio Luca Marano, Jumana Issa	Switzerland
The Life Underground		Loïc Hobi	Switzerland
Mr. Pete & the Iron Horse		Kilian Vilim	Switzerland
Real News		Luka Popadić	Switzerland, Serbia
Strangers	Chute	Nora Longatti	Switzerland
Thing	Ding	Pascale Egli, Aurelio Ghirardelli	Switzerland

==== Competition of Author's Courts (Concorso Corti d’autore) ====
Highlighted title indicates winner

English title	Original title	Director(s)	Production country
Caricaturana		Radu Jude	Romania
Creature	Criatura	María Silvia Esteve	Argentina, Switzerland
Dead Flash		Bertrand Mandico	France
Fou de Bassan		Yann Gonzalez	France
Gotta Fabricate Your Own Gifts	Il faut fabriquer ses cadeaux	Cyril Schäublin	Switzerland
Happiness Is a Journey		Ivete Lucas, Patrick Bresnan	United States, Estonia
Hotel Royal		Salomé Lamas	Portugal
How Do You Measure a Year?		Jay Rosenblatt	United States
Penalty Shot	Kazneni udarac	Rok Biček	Croatia, Slovenia, Austria
Se posso permettermi		Marco Bellocchio	Italy

=== Out of Competition (Fuori Concorso) ===
English title	Original title	Director(s)	Production country
From the Planet of the Humans	Dal pianeta degli umani	Giovanni Cioni	Italy, Belgium, France
The Monster of the Crypt	Il mostro della cripta	Daniele Misischia	Italy
Mad God		Phil Tippett	United States
Pathos Ethos Logos		Joaquim Pinto, Nuno Leonel	Portugal
Rampart		Marko Grba Singh	Serbia
She Will		Charlotte Colbert	United Kingdom
The Sadness		Rob Jabbaz	Taiwan

=== Open Doors Screenings ===
English title	Original title	Director(s)	Production country
Aswang		Alyx Ayn Arumpac	Philippines, France, Norway, Germany, Qatar, Denmark
The Inseminator	Nguoi truyen giong	Bui Kim Quy	Vietnam, Germany
The Long Walk	Bor mi vanh chark	Mattie Do	Laos, Spain, Singapore
Manta Ray		Phuttiphong Aroonpheng	Thailand, France, China
Money Has Four Legs		Maung Sun	Myanmar
The Seen and Unseen	Sekala niskala	Kamila Andini	Indonesia
The Story of Southern Islet		Keat Aun Chong	Malaysia
They Sing Up on the Hill	Od ba gegee	Bat-Amgalan Lkhagvajav, Ian Allardyce	Mongolia, United Kingdom
Young Love		Lomorpich Rithy	Cambodia

=== History (s) of cinema (Histoire(s) du cinéma) ===
English title	Original title	Director(s)	Production country
Around Rocha's Table	A Távola de Rocha	Samuel Barbosa	Portugal, Japan
Destiny	Al-massir	Youssef Chahine	Egypt, France
Derborence		Francis Reusser	Switzerland
Dick		Andrew Fleming	United States, France, Canada
Doctor Chance	Docteur Chance	F. J. Ossang	France, Chile

=== Retrospective (Retrospettiva) ===
English title	Original title	Director(s)	Production country
12 directors for 12 cities: Genoa	12 registi per 12 città: Genova	Alberto Lattuada	Italy
Anna		Alberto Lattuada	Italy, France
Love in the city	Amore in città	Alberto Lattuada, Michelangelo Antonioni, Federico Fellini, Carlo Lizzani, Francesco Maselli, Dino Risi, Cesare Zavattini	Italy
Stay as You Are	Così come sei	Alberto Lattuada	Italy, Spain
White Sister	Bianco rosso e...	Alberto Lattuada	Italy, France, Spain

=== Locarno Kids ===
English title	Original title	Director(s)	Production country
Clorofilla dal cielo blu		Victor J. Tognola	Switzerland
Go West		Buster Keaton	USA
Here My Village		Abas Aram	Iran
Trash - The legend of the magic pyramid	Trash - La leggenda della piramide magica	Luca Della Grotta, Francesco Dafano	Italy
Too Far Away	Zu weit weg	Sarah Winkenstette	Germany

=== Swiss Panorama (Panorama Suisse) ===
English title	Original title	Director(s)	Production country
Atlas		Niccolò Castelli	Switzerland, Belgium, Italy
The Game	Das Spiel	Roman Hodel	Switzerland
The Girl and the Spider	Das Mädchen und die Spinne	Ramon Zürcher, Silvan Zürcher	Switzerland
Mare		Andrea Štaka	Switzerland, Croatia
The New Gospel	Das neue Evangelium	Milo Rau	Switzerland, Germany
Nothing but the Sun	Apenas el sol	Arami Ullón	Switzerland, Paraguay
Your Street	Deine Strasse	Güzin Kar	Switzerland

=== International Critics' Week (Semaine de la critique) ===
English title	Original title	Director(s)	Production country
A Thousand Fires		Saeed Taji Farouky	France /Switzerland /Netherlands /Palestine
The Bad Man		Lee Yong Chao	Taiwan
The Balcony	Film balkonowy	Paweł Łoziński	Poland
Bukolika		Karol Pałka	Poland
How to Kill a Cloud		Tuija Halttunen	Finland /Denmark
Stand Up My Beauty		Heidi Specogna	Switzerland /Germany
Walk With Angels		Tomasz Wysokiński	Poland

== Official Awards ==
The following awards were presented for films shown in competition:

=== International Competition ===
- Golden Leopard: Vengeance Is Mine, All Others Pay Cash by Edwin
- Special Jury Prize: A New Old Play by Qiu Jiongjiong
- Best Direction Award: Abel Ferrara for Zeros and Ones
- Best Actor Award: Mohamed Mellali, Valero Escolar for The Odd-Job Men
- Best Actress Award: Anastasiya Krasovskaya, Gerda by Natalya Kudryashova
- Special Mentions:
  - Soul Of A Beast by Lorenz Merz
  - The Sacred Spirit by Chema García Ibarra

=== Filmmakers of the Present Competition ===
- Golden Leopard - Filmmakers of the Present: Brotherhood by Francesco Montagner
- Special Jury Prize: L’Été L’éternité by Émilie Aussel
- Best Emerging Director: Hleb Papou for Il Legionario
- Leopard for the Best Actress: Saskia Rosendahl for No One's With the Calves
- Leopard for the Best Actor: Gia Agumava for Wet Sand

=== Leopards of Tomorrow ===
==== International Competition ====
- Pardino d’oro SRG SSR for the Best International Short Film:
  - Neon Phantom by Leonardo Martinelli
- Pardino d’argento SRG SSR for the International Competition:
  - The Demons of Dorothy by Alexis Langlois
- Pardi di domani Best Direction Award – BONALUMI Engineering:
  - Eliane Esther Bots for In Flow of Words
- Medien Patent Verwaltung AG Award:
  - Home for Myriam Uwiragiye Birara
- Special Mentions:
  - First Time (The Time For All But Sunset – Violet) by Nicolaas Schmidt

==== National Competition ====
- Pardino d’oro Swiss Life for the Best Auteur Short Film:
  - Strangers by Nora Longatti
- Pardino d’argento Swiss Life for the National Competition:
  - After A Room by Naomi Pacifique
- Best Swiss Newcomer Award:
  - Flavio Luca Marano, Jumana Issa for It Must

==== Competition of Author's Courts ====
- Pardino d’oro Swiss Life for the Best Author Short Film:
  - Creature by María Silvia Esteve

=== First Feature ===
- Swatch First Feature Award:
  - She Will by Charlotte Colbert
- Special Mention: Holy Emy (Agia Emi) by Araceli Lemos

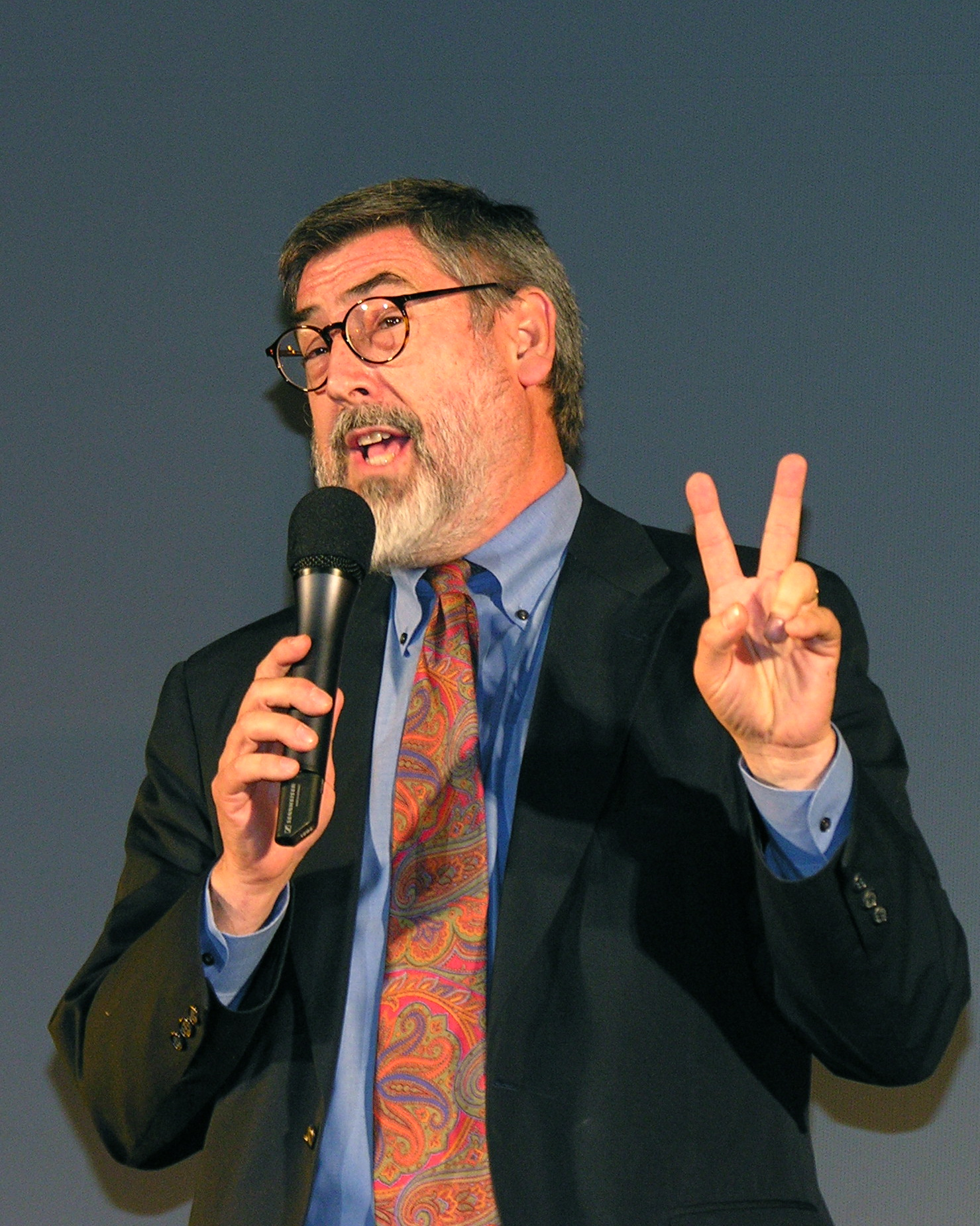
John Landis winner of Leopard of Honour, the lifetime achievement award

== Special awards ==
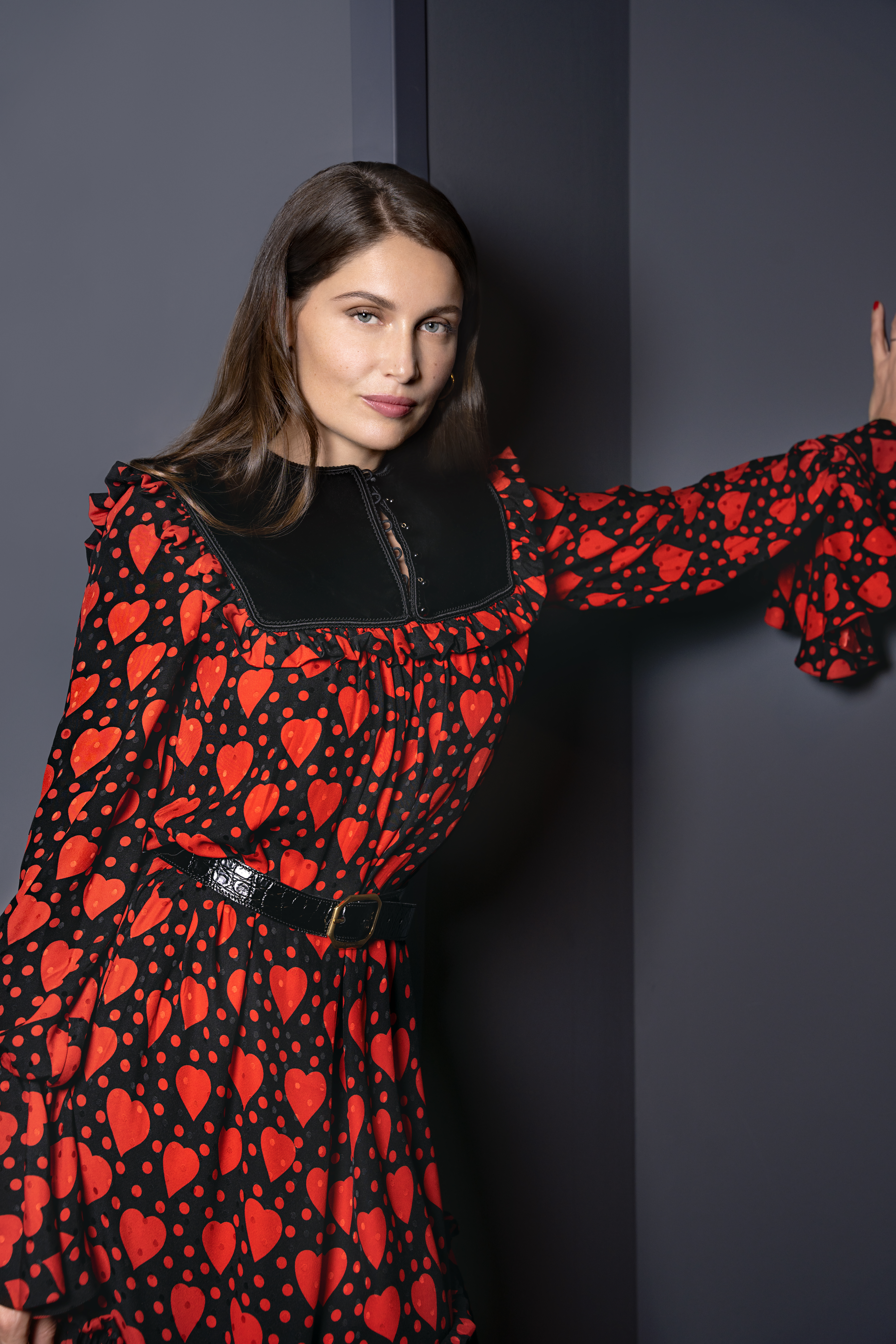
Laetitia Casta winner of Excellence Award Davide Campari

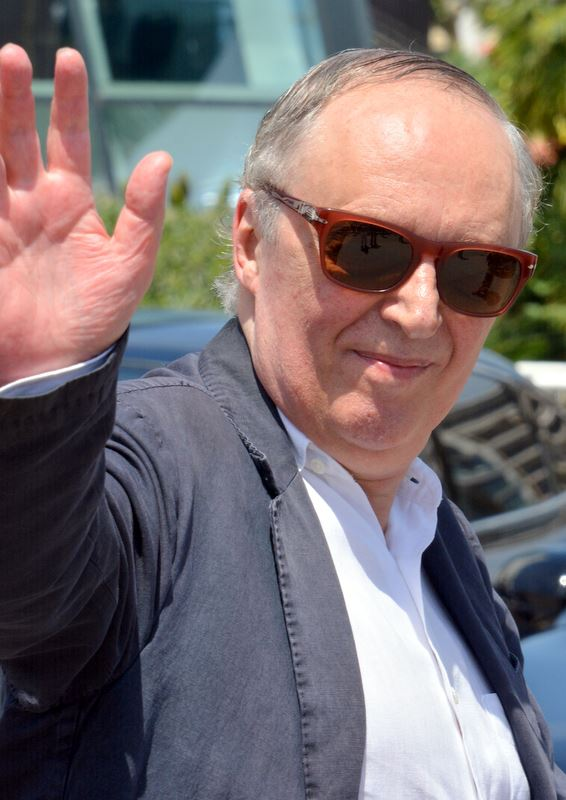
Dario Argento winner of Special Lifetime achievement award

=== Leopard of Honour (Pardo d’onore Manor award) ===
- John Landis

=== Excellence Award Davide Campari ===
- Laetitia Casta

=== Locarno Film Festival Short Film Candidate for the European Film Awards ===
- In Flow of Words

=== Special Lifetime Achievement Award ===
- Dario Argento

=== Prix du public UBS Award ===
- Hinterland by Stefan Ruzowitzky

=== Variety Piazza Grande Award ===
- Rose by Aurélie Saada
