= Balearic (film) =

- Spanish theatrical release poster
- Directed by: Ion de Sosa
- Screenplay by: Ion de Sosa; Juan González; Chema García Ibarra; Julián Génisson; Lorena Iglesias
- Produced by: Marina Perales Marhuenda; Leire Apellaniz; Miguel Molina; Xavier Rocher
- Starring: Lara Gallo; Elias Hwidar; Ada Tormo; Paula Gala; María Llopis; Luka Peroš; Christina Rosenvinge; Sofía Asencio; Manolo Marín; Moisés Richart; Lorena Iglesias; Julián Génisson; Pili Guerra; Federico Madrid; Héctor Arnau; Marta Bassols; Zorion Eguileor
- Cinematography: Cris Neira
- Edited by: Sergio Jiménez
- Music by: Xenia Rubio
- Production companies: Apellaniz y de Sosa; Jaibo Films; Umbracle Cine; La Fabrica Nocturna Cinéma
- Distributed by: Silencio Cinema
- Release dates: 10 August 2025 (Locarno); 12 December 2025 (Spain)
- Countries: Spain; France
- Language: Spanish

Balearic is a 2025 film directed by Ion de Sosa from a screenplay that he co-wrote with Juan González, Chema García Ibarra, Julián Génisson, and Lorena Iglesias. It straddles between satire and social denunciation.

== Plot ==
Set in Saint John's Eve, the plot follows a group of young friends breaking into a private property in Mallorca, where they are attacked and surrounded by black dogs, while in another party nearby the attendants find themselves unable to use their swimming pool because they perceive the pain endured by the people in the first swimming pool.

== Cast ==
- Lara Gallo
- Elias Hwidar
- Ada Tormo
- Paula Gala
- María Llopis
- Luka Peroš
- Christina Rosenvinge
- Sofía Asencio
- Manolo Marín
- Moisés Richart
- Lorena Iglesias
- Julián Génisson
- Pili Guerra
- Federico Madrid
- Héctor Arnau
- Marta Bassols
- Zorion Eguileor

== Production ==
Back in 2021, Ion de Sosa cited The Exterminating Angel (1962) and The Swimmer (1968) as "two key references" for the film. Balearic is a Spanish-French co-production by Apellaniz y de Sosa alongside Jaibo Films, Umbracle Cine, and La Fabrica Nocturna Cinéma. It was shot in Alcoleja, province of Alicante, while some footage was also filmed in the Basque Country. While in post-production, the film made it to the 'Impulso Work In Progress' selection of the 2024 Abycine Albacete Independent Film Festival.

== Release ==
The film had its world premiere in the 'Filmmakers of the Present' slate of the 78th Locarno Film Festival on 10 August 2025. It also made it to the 'Thrill' strand of the 2025 BFI London Film Festival. It is scheduled to be released theatrically in Spain on 12 December 2025 under Silencio Cinema.

== Accolades ==
Year	Award	Category	Nominee(s)	Result	Ref.
2026	40th Goya Awards	Best New Director	Ion de Sosa	Nominated	

== See also ==
- List of Spanish films of 2025
