= A New Old Play =

2021 Hong Kong-French film by Qiu Jiongjiong

- Poster for Locarno Film Festival
- Traditional Chinese: 椒麻堂會
- Simplified Chinese: 椒麻堂会
- Hanyu Pinyin: Jiāomá tánghuì
- Jyutping: Ziu^{1} Maa^{4} Tong^{4} Wui^{6}
- Directed by: Qiu Jiongjiong
- Screenplay by: Qiu Jiongjiong
- Produced by: Ding Ningyuan
- Starring: Yi Sicheng; Guan Nan; Qiu Zhimin; Gu Tao; Xue Xuchun
- Cinematography: Robbin Feng
- Edited by: Qiu Jiongjiong
- Music by: Lili Diao
- Production companies: Uluka Productions; Hippocampe Productions
- Distributed by: Parallax Films
- Release dates: 13 August 2021 (Locarno); 30 April 2025 (France)
- Running time: 179 minutes
- Countries: Hong Kong; France
- Languages: Sichuanese; Mandarin

A New Old Play (Chinese: 椒麻堂會) is a 2021 epic film directed and written by Qiu Jiongjiong. As Qiu's seventh film, it marks his first fictional feature. A co-production between Hong Kong's Uluka Productions and France's Hippocampe Productions, the film stars Yi Sicheng as Qiu Fu, a recently deceased Sichuan opera actor, alongside Guan Nan, Qiu Zhimin, Gu Tao, and Xue Xuchun. The story chronicles Qiu Fu's life and career in China from the 1920s to the 1980s through his remembrances during his journey into the netherworld, featuring events such as the Second Sino-Japanese War, the Chinese Civil War, the Great Chinese Famine, and the Cultural Revolution.

Qiu Jiongjiong conceived of the project in 2017 after illustrating the biography for his grandfather and Sichuan opera actor Qiu Fu. Inspired to tell the story with film, Qiu based the protagonist on his grandfather and began developing a screenplay from May 2017 to February 2018 under the working title The Neo-New Adventures. Production design spanned six months before principal photography began in August 2019 in Leshan, Sichuan over three months. Post-production took place in France, with French filmmaker Marie-Pierre Duhamel-Muller involved in the editing. The film also marks the second film to be primarily in Sichuanese, after the 1962 film Conscription.

A New Old Play had its world premiere in competition for the Golden Leopard at the 74th Locarno Film Festival on 13 August 2021, where it received the Special Jury Prize. It also garnered various accolades and received positive reviews from critics, with praises particularly on its themes, narrative style and complexities, and production design. Due to censorship in China, only single-time private screenings were held worldwide from 2021 to 2022. The film received its first wide release in France on 30 April 2025.

== Plot ==
Qiu Fu, a renowned Sichuan opera actor, meets his demise. Ox-Head and Horse-Face are sent to escort him into the netherworld to perform for Yanluo Wang. Qiu refuses to accept his fate and tries to flee, much to the envoys' confusion as they ask him how he, who has been an artiste since the age of eight, does not embrace death. Qiu retorts that he began his opera journey at seven and starts to reminisce about his life.

During the Warlord Era, an operaphile Pocky rises through the ranks to become a military commander. He uses his newfound power to form an opera troupe called the New-New Theatre School. Early in its operation, Qiu Fu, a foundling of a famous opera actor who died performing on stage, is sent to the troupe by his mother, who abandons him to remarry. Qiu learns opera singing from the troupe's teachers, but his performances are unsatisfactory. One day, while practising, he encounters Pocky, who takes a liking to him and accepts him as an apprentice. After some training, Qiu debuts as an opera performer. The Second World War soon breaks out, and the troupe begins charity tours to raise funds against Japan's invasion. One night, Qiu is intoxicated after drinking a bowl of poisonous mushroom soup and dreams of flying across the city on a leaf, only to be bombed by a Japanese fighter jet.

In the netherworld, Qiu follows the envoys to the Naihe Bridge, where he encounters Crooky, a servant of the troupe who mysteriously disappeared decades ago. The envoys explain that they never received orders to take Crooky, but he keeps returning to the netherworld, trapping his soul between realms. He opens an inn at the Naihe Bridge to welcome both the deceased and demons. Qiu decides to reunite with Crooky and stays at the inn while watching his young apprentices perform rituals in the living world. Dissatisfied with their performances, he reminisces about his own early career.

By 1945, Qiu has established himself as an opera actor. However, Pocky, now a warlord, worries about his fate under Chiang Kai-shek's rule and loses interest in opera. Before the Civil War, he disbands the troupe to protect the actors and their families from his impending downfall. Unemployed, Qiu's life worsens even after the establishment of the People's Republic of China, when the troupe is reformed and renamed the People's Sichuan Opera Troupe. Qiu's daughter dies subsequently during the Great Chinese Famine, but his son Hei survives. One day, Qiu finds an abandoned infant girl on the street and, despite his meager living conditions, takes her in. He and his wife struggle to feed her and resort to stealing feces, only to be caught by cadres who accuse them of stealing state property. Qiu sings to the cadres, leveraging his fame as an actor to escape. They manage to cook the maggots found in the feces to feed the girl, sustaining her life. Later, the girl's mother returns, claiming she abandoned her only because her husband tried to eat the child. Though reluctant, Qiu's wife returns the baby. During the Cultural Revolution, the New-New troupe is labeled as feudal, facing persecution from the Red Guards. Hei, now a teenager, wishes to join the Big Link-up in Beijing but is locked up by his family. Desperate, he escapes through a window and flies across the city on a leaf. Years later, now a high-ranking Red Guard, Hei returns home and learns that Qiu is released from labor and assigned to minor roles in plays.

After reminiscing about his career, Qiu bids farewell to Crooky and shares one last drink with the envoys. Confused about how he will remember all his lines after drinking the Meng-po soup, he is reassured by the envoys that his artistic intuition will guide him. Qiu boards the boat and reaches the other side, queuing for the Meng-po soup before drinking it all. The camera pans to each of the other characters drinking the soup at various moments, then returns to Qiu's empty seat. The director, in modern attire, sits down and is served a bowl of Meng-po soup.

== Cast ==
- Yi Sicheng as Qiu Fu, a renowned Sichuan opera actor of the New-New Theatre School
  - Chen Haoyu as young Qiu Fu, a seven-year-old foundling who becomes an opera student
- Guan Nan as Tong Huafeng, Qiu's wife
- Qiu Zhimin as Pocky, a military commander, opera enthusiast, and the founder of the New-New Theatre School
- Gu Tao as Crooky, a servant at the New-New Theatre School who eventually becomes an inn owner in the netherworld
- Xue Xuchun as:
  - Ah Hei, Qiu's son
  - Chicken Foot, (Note: The Chicken foot god (Chinese: 雞腳神) is a gnome-like creature in Sichuanese mythology.) a cook at Pocky's inn

In addition, Liu Boyu and Huang Lingchao appear as Ox-Head and Horse-Face, the envoys of the netherworld, while director Qiu Jiongjiong made a cameo appearance as himself.

== Production ==
=== Conception ===
"I began to piece together the story of an ordinary man, a man who embodied the spirit of a clown, living through the greatest upheavals of our times. There is nothing new under the sun, as we know. However, these characters are just like you and me, and we each in our own way will continue to repeat this same song of humanity."

— Qiu Jiongjiong, the director and writer, on the inspiration behind the screenplay for A New Old Play

Qiu Fu, the grandfather of director Qiu Jiongjiong, was a Sichuan opera actor who gained fame for playing chou roles (Note: Chou role (丑角) is literally translated as "clown role" in English, although xiaochou (小丑), the Chinese term for clown, carries different connotations compared to chou role in Sichuan opera.) in the 1930s and 1940s throughout Sichuan. He died in 1987 when Qiu Jiongjiong was ten years old. Growing up in Leshan, Sichuan, Qiu Jiongjiong developed an interest in Sichuan opera influenced by his grandfather, which ultimately inspired him to pursue a career in filmmaking. He also described having a "close" relationship with his grandfather, who served as a "crucial figure in [his] artistic inspirations" for his artworks and films. After making the documentary film Mr. Zhang Believes (2015), Qiu struggled with inspiration for several years despite still wanting to create films. In 2017, on the 30th anniversary of Qiu Fu's death, Qiu Jiongjiong's father began writing a biography to commemorate Qiu Fu and asked Qiu to illustrate for the book. After creating illustrations for all 15 chapters in two months, Qiu felt a sense of "incompleteness" and wanted to approach the subject of his grandfather "through the medium of film", which inspired him to start writing the screenplay that would become A New Old Play. It marks the second film produced by Qiu Jiongjiong featuring Qiu Fu, following the documentary short film Ode to Joy (2007), which depicted a stage performance in remembrance of the 20th anniversary of Qiu Fu's death and was cited by Qiu as a significant inspiration for A New Old Play's focus on the lives of ordinary people.

=== Pre-production ===
Qiu Jiongjiong began writing the screenplay in May 2017 and completed it in February 2018, taking about seven months to finish a script that exceeded 100,000 words. He based the story on his father's biography, along with some additional background research. It marks Qiu's seventh film and first fictional feature. Qiu described the story itself as "non-fictional", and he only aimed to create a sense of fiction through the film's aesthetics, drawing inspiration from both Chinese and Western stage plays. The screenplay features Qiu Fu's status as a chou, which Qiu Jiongjiong referred to as the "clown spirit", calling it the "core and quintessence of his cinematic grammar". He cited Federico Fellini's works as an inspiration on how circus clowns served as viewpoint characters in his films. In Sichuan opera, chou roles (clowns) are usually not essential to the storyline but serve as the focal point, which Qiu referred to as the "author's perspective". In addition to Qiu Fu, Qiu Jiongjiong also created other clown-like characters, such as Crooky and Chicken Foot. These characters exist beyond the chronological timeline and the boundaries of the living and the dead in the plot, allowing them to serve as narrators and storytellers. He utilised these characters to interject the narrative to create a distancing effect, but rather than directly breaking the fourth wall, Qiu aimed to re-examine the story naturally from the narrator and storyteller's perspectives.

Qiu drew inspiration from his personal experiences and Sichuanese culture for the portrayal of clowns, noting that Sichuanese people are known for their optimism and dark sense of humour despite facing fate and suffering, qualities he found resonant with clowns' modest demeanor and playful exterior. Qiu also referenced the Great Chinese Famine in the film, a topic often omitted in other epic films like Farewell My Concubine and The Blue Kite (both 1993), explaining that he included it because he based the story primarily on his grandfather's biography and aimed to restore the original narrative. However, he noted that there are limited records about his grandfather's life during the Cultural Revolution, and he had interviewed an elderly person knowledgeable about his grandfather's adoption of an infant girl for additional information. He concluded the screenplay with an anticlimax to reflect the daily lives of ordinary people, noting that while their stories may lack a climactic arc, they can still convey profound emotional depth. The project was presented at the Golden Horse Project Promotion in November 2017, where it won the CNC Prize from the Centre national du cinéma et de l'image animée. In May 2018, it received the Hubert Bals Fund at the International Film Festival Rotterdam, under the working title The Neo-New Adventures, (Note: In an interview with Cinema Scope, Qiu Jiongjiong referred to the working title as The Adventures of the New-New Theatre.) named after the opera troupe established at the film's opening. The first table-read took place in the same month, and the cast was given a year to prepare for their characters.

Most of the actors and crew members are Qiu's family and friends, with many crew members also appeared in minor roles in the film. He cast them because he wanted to tell the story "locally", and described the shoot as a "party" among his closed ones. Yi Sicheng, a film festival curator who befriended Qiu at the YunFest Film Festival and made a brief appearance in Mr. Zhang Believes, was invited by Qiu to star in the lead role. Qiu chose to avoid casting an actor of a similar age to the character Qiu Fu, as he felt the demeanor of actors around the same age as the character was unsuitable, and he was drawn to Yi's "old-timer" vibes, which he described as both "elegant and resilient". Guan Nan (who portrayed Tong Huafeng) and Xue Xuchan (who played dual roles as Hei and Chicken Foot) were also both film festival curators. Qiu chose Xue for the role of Chicken Foot due to his comedic awareness, and Xue received dialect coaching to prepare for his characters, as Hei speaks in Southwestern Mandarin while Chicken Foot uses the Leshan dialect with an Emei accent. Qu Tao, an independent documentary filmmaker, was cast as the aphasic character Crooky, specifically designed by Qiu because he believed Qu would struggle to remember the character's lines. Qiu Zhimin and Chen Haoyu, who played Pocky and young Qiu Fu, are Qiu Jiongjiong's father and nephew, respectively. Despite initially hesitating to cast his father due to his age, Qiu Jiongjiong ultimately agreed when his father volunteered for the role, noting his similarities to Pocky. Qiu's cousin composed the film's score, drawing on elements from Sichuan opera, while his uncle served as the artistic advisor. Qiu Jiongjiong made a cameo appearance at the end of the film, citing his reasons as being both the author and part of the family history central to the story, as well as his desire to become part of the history of clowns as both a descendant and an enthusiast. All actors, except for the troupe teachers, were untrained, while the troupe roles were filled by professional Sichuan opera actors.

=== Production design ===
The film utilised visibly fake backdrops and set design, such as white fabrics to mimic turbulent waves during the disbandment scene of the New-New Theatre School, a style reminiscent of stage plays

Set construction spanned about six months. The shoot took place entirely at a factory owned by a friend of Qiu's, with the production set constructed in a textile mill covering approximately 400 square meters (~4,306 square feet). A white shed was also built in the factory's parking lot, bringing the total size of the sets to about 1,000 square meters (~10,764 square feet). It was also the filming location for Qiu's previous film Mr. Zhang Believes, for which he wrote the screenplay with that set in mind. He likened the production style to the works of Italo Calvino, and explained that he chose a similar set design with Mr. Zhang Believes because he saw handcrafted production design as "an extension of creative invention", aiming to "refurbish through techniques" from early screen and stage plays. Qiu Jiongjiong (who was a trained visual artist) served as the art director and participated in creating the set props. The set was mainly decorated with hand-painted artwork, while all the props, walls, staircases, and backdrops were also hand-crafted. Most materials used for the set renovations were sourced directly from the surrounding factory, primarily utilising cloth, along with cardboard, wood, and cotton.

Qiu stated that he chose to use "exaggerated" set and props to suit the film's tone of absurdity and black humour. He also created and manipulated a "sense of alienation" through low-budget filmmaking, using visibly fake backgrounds and a theatrical style of production sets, influenced by Bertolt Brecht's plays. For instance, a grey cloth was used to represent a river, while wind-blown plastic bags and shaking white fabrics were used to mimic the turbulent waves, with critics comparing the scantily decorated settings to Roy Andersson's films. Lin Sheng-wei at United Daily News compared the "flimsy" and simplistic scenery to stage plays, calling it a "forced defamiliarization" that required the audience to "use their imagination in every scene", which encourages the audience to focus on the characters and immerse in their emotions to "make the absurd props come to life"; while 34th Street Magazine's Weike Li described the "obviously contrived sets" as "intentionally creating a sense of comical foreignness", presenting history in expressionism. While designing the netherworld, Qiu cited Jacques Tati's visual style as an inspiration, and made limited distinctions from the living world sets, primarily by dimming the lighting and using black-coloured props instead of white.

=== Filming ===
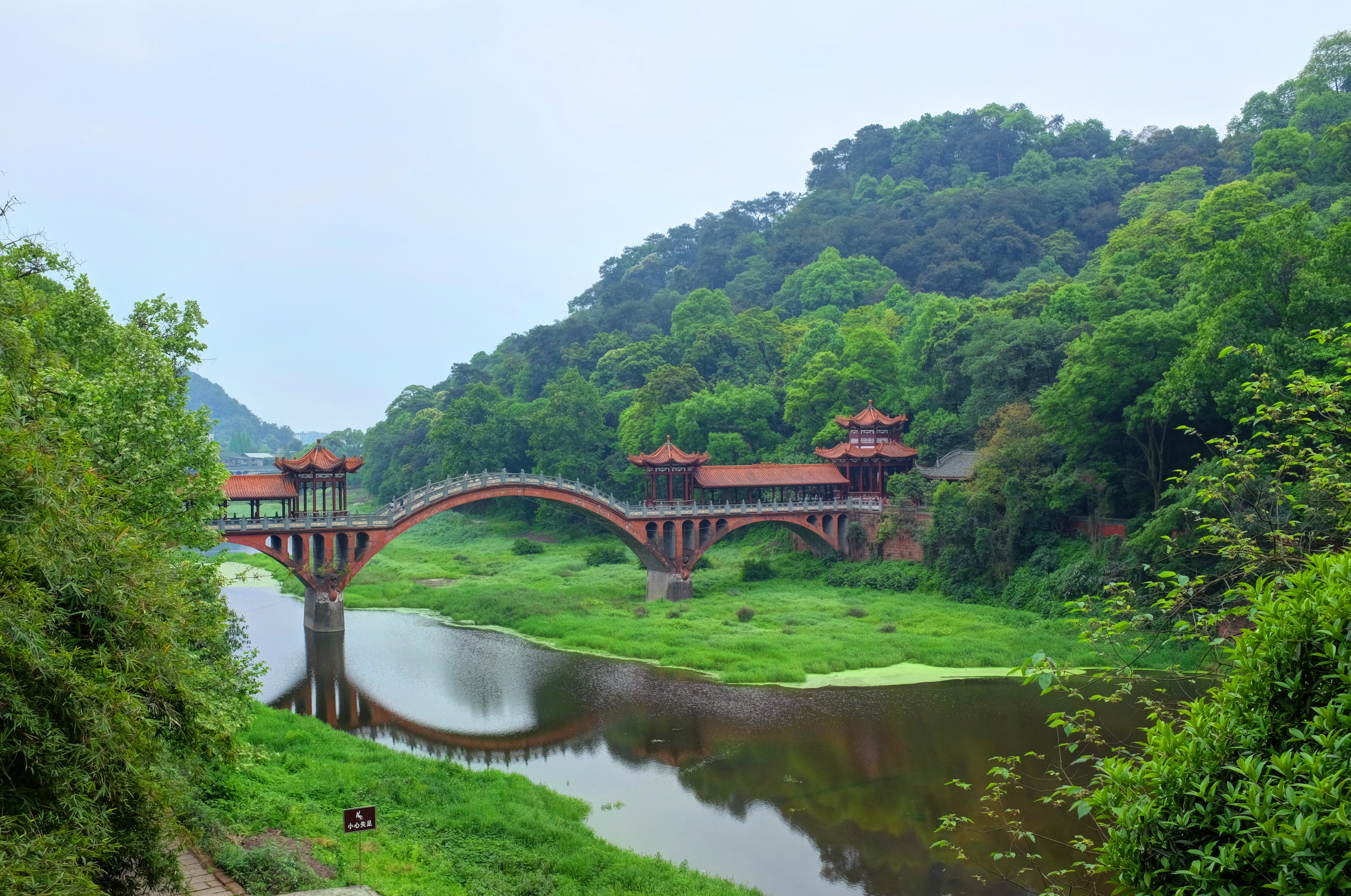
Filming took place at Qiu Jiongjiong's hometown Leshan

Principal photography began in August 2019 in Leshan, Sichuan, China, the hometown of Qiu Jiongjiong. Filming lasted a total of 83 days over a three-month period. Robbin Feng served as the cinematographer, using an Arri Alexa for the shoot, a camera model that Qiu described as "better than anything [he had] worked with before". In terms of cinematography, horizontal shifts and lateral camera movements were primarily employed to present the composition as an "unveiling scroll of Chinese painting". The composition was mainly planimetric, with the camera positioned at a 90-degree angle to the actors and utilising perpendicular tracking shots. Qiu aimed to convey a sense of epic scale by accentuating the shallow depth of field in the set design, and compared the composition to the triptychs and frescoes of Giotto di Bondone. The production team planned the shooting schedule in advance, allowing set pieces to be disassembled and reassembled between scenes. The costumes used in the film were all from Qiu Jiongjiong's father's former opera troupe.

The entire cast stayed in Leshan for a month after filming to record their dialogues, as no sounds were recorded on location during filming. Qiu cited several reasons for this decision, including to avoid the high costs of on-site recording, the background noises at the factory, and the fact that most of the actors were non-locals who could not speak in standard Leshan dialects, therefore he decided to record dialogue after the filming wrapped. He also noted that it could enable the dialects to be delivered more precisely, allowing actors to adjust their emotions for a better performance, while crowd scenes and scenes without visible lip movements also permit changes to the dialogue. He chose to feature the film's dialogues in Sichuanese, his native language, which he described as "vivid and humorous" and having a "strong nostalgia" stemming from the dialect's evolution over hundreds of years since the diaspora from other provinces during the Ming Dynasty. This film is the second to be made primarily in Sichuanese since Conscription (1962). Dubbing was supervised by sound designer Wang Ran, who also created all the sound effects for the film.

=== Post-production ===
Post-production took place in France, with Qiu also serving as the editor. French filmmaker Marie-Pierre Duhamel-Muller, who edited Mr. Zhang Believes, was also involved in the editing through video conferences and provided advice on restructuring the narrative. The film features two parallel narratives, one set in the living world and the other in the netherworld, with both timelines unfolding linearly and the living world timeline is interspersed into the netherworld timeline as flashbacks. Producer Ding Ningyuan described the post-production process as "tense" due to budget constraints and the need to meet deadlines for film festivals. The film is co-produced by Hong Kong's Uluka Productions and France's Hippocampe Productions. Parallax, the rights division of Midnight Blur Films, managed its international sales.

The film was presented at the Hong Kong-Asia Film Financing Forum in June 2020, and at Marché du Film in July 2021, where it was retitled A New Old Play. Regarding the film titles, Qiu named the film Jiaoma tanghui (Chinese: 椒麻堂會) in Chinese. (Note: Jiaoma (椒麻) refers to the spicy bite of Sichuan pepper, a common flavor in Sichuan cuisine, while tanghui (堂會) refers to private banquets hosted by the wealthy, such as weddings or funerals, featuring entertainers.) He literally translated the Chinese title to "The Gathering and Celebration of Peppery and Chili Flavors", which reflects the main character Qiu Fu's roots and occupation as a performer both before and after death and he felt it more accurately described the film. The English title, A New Old Play, was suggested by the producer and the English subtitles translator, which Qiu found captured the film's themes of "history endlessly repeating itself" and evoking "a sense of déjà vu". In November 2021, the film was also presented at TIFFCOM, Tokyo International Film Festival's project market.

== Themes ==
=== Portrayal of history ===
A New Old Play chronicles a series of Chinese historical events from the 1920s to the 1980s, including the collapse of the Qing dynasty, the Warlord Era, World War II and the fall of Nanking, the Chinese Civil War, Mao Zedong's Communist Party rule, the Great Chinese Famine, the Great Leap Forward, and the Cultural Revolution. Qiu Jiongjiong identified a theme of the film as the notion that history endlessly repeats itself. He summarised that the film's overall tone conveys the tragedy of destiny, aiming to create a contrast between the vividness of each individual and the cruelty of their irresistible fates. Qiu also explained that he found many historical narratives focus on context or abstract ideologies, but when the narrative is centered on specific individuals, it becomes easier to "identify certain problems".

Film scholar Hao Jian specifically commented on the film's approach to presenting historical memory through familial and personal experiences, which aligns with Michel Foucault's discourse on popular memory and allows for a "faithful" portrayal of history, but from a new perspective that reinterprets and questions history—specifically, in the case of A New Old Play, from the perspective of a clown and infused with a sense of comedy. Qiu stated that he did not intend to recreate historical scenes but rather aimed to convey a general sense of the historical context of that time through metaphorical expressions, such as the film's simplistic and theatrical production style. Academic Isha Ting noted that the film's aesthetics resonate with Brecht's distancing effect, which encourages the audience to focus on social roots and structures while reflecting on what can be transformed.

=== Sichuanese culture ===
"In this film, the connection between those onstage and offstage, as well as inside and outside the Sichuan opera being put together in the story, is blurred. What happens onstage is integrated into the narrative, and the expressions onstage are blended into the characters' everyday lives. This is because Sichuan opera took root in my body and soul through the mundanity of everyday life. Just like when generations of Sichuan opera goers, who spent much of their time in the theater weeping, sighing, falling asleep, etc., their lives are in a way inter-textualized with the performance on stage, creating an adventitious symmetry of life itself; were they just watching a performance, or are they themselves a part of, or even integrated into the performance?"

— Qiu Jiongjiong on incorporating the characteristics of Sichuan opera into the narrative

Qiu described his motive for creating A New Old Play as a desire to craft a "Sichuan-flavored saga", incorporating local elements without reducing them to conceptualised spectacles or stereotypes. Notable elements added to the film include Sichuanese people, Sichuan opera, and Sichuanese dialects, all heavily influenced by the culture surrounding him during his upbringing.

Regarding Sichuan opera, Qiu sought to transform the traditional operatic language into a more accessible form of expression that could effectively communicate while retaining its flavor and melodies, sharing similarities with the works of Geoffrey Chaucer, François Rabelais, and Giovanni Boccaccio. Despite featuring exaggerated theatrical staging in its production design, film scholar Michael Berry observed that these production values closely parallel Sichuan opera, which enhance the authenticity and emotional depth of the performances while maintaining the overall tone of realism. Qiu identified the characteristics of Sichuan opera as "mundanity of everyday life" filled with expressions of deep and personal humanity, and he integrated these characteristics into the story, blending the ordinary with the daily lives of the characters. He compared the viewing experience to that of opera-goers inter-textualizing with the stage performances, creating a symmetry with their own lives and immersing themselves in the performance. Scholar Wong Nim-yan also recognised this perspective, noting that there are limited Sichuan opera scenes in the film, but the cinematography, production design, and dialogues strongly resemble it, and compared its central thought to traditional Sichuan opera pieces like Inn of Successive Promotion (連升店) and Writing Essays (做文章), suggesting that the film itself can be viewed as a form of Sichuan opera.

The film also explores thanatology, which Qiu describes as stemming from the Sichuanese people's understanding of life and death. A significant part of the film is set in the underworld, using a secular perspective to speculate about the afterlife. He found that the Sichuanese people hold an optimistic view of death, citing traditional Ba Ba banquets (壩壩宴), family banquets held for both weddings and funerals, as an example and describing them as a reflection of the Sichuanese perspective on death as "a harmony between sorrow and joy". He composed the story in which the protagonist reflects on his life and anticipates his post-death journey, aligning it with Sichuanese views on death and describing the film as "a flowing banquet of life and death".

== Distribution ==
=== Release ===
A New Old Play had its world premiere in competition for the Golden Leopard at the 74th Locarno Film Festival on 13 August 2021. It was subsequently screened in the A Window on Asian Cinema section at the 26th Busan International Film Festival, in competition for the Golden Apricot at the 18th Yerevan International Film Festival, for the Montgolfière d'Or at the 47th Three Continents Festival, and for the Silver Screen Award at the 32nd Singapore International Film Festival. The film was also shown at the 16th Jogja-NETPAC Asian Film Festival and 51st International Film Festival Rotterdam. Screenings and an exhibition of the film's storyboards and character design art took place at Zhongshan Hall during the 24th Taipei Film Festival, where Qiu Jiongjiong was honoured as the Filmmaker in Focus for that edition. In addition, it screened in competition for the Firebird Award at the 46th Hong Kong International Film Festival, as well as at the 2022 Adelaide Film Festival and the 11th Dharamshala International Film Festival.

The film had its North American premiere in February 2022 at the Museum of the Moving Image in New York City, beginning its tour in the United States at the Anthology Film Archives starting 20 May 2022, distributed by Icarus Films. Special screenings were also held on 10 and 11 September 2022 at Northwest Film Forum in Seattle, United States, on 4 March 2023 in Singapore at The Projector, and on 27 March 2024 during Art Basel Hong Kong. In May 2024, the distribution rights for the film were acquired by France's Carlotta Films, Japan's Katsuben Cinema Club, and Singapore's Cineaste Production House during the Cannes Film Market, with Cineaste handling sales in all Southeast Asian territories except Indonesia and Vietnam. The Hollywood Reporter initially reported that all three companies were scheduled to release the film theatrically within the same year. The film was theatrically released in France on 30 April 2025.

=== Home media ===
A New Old Play was released on Blu-ray in North America in 2023, distributed by Kani Releasing. The home media release also included Qiu Jiongjiong's short film Ode to Joy (2007), along with character design artwork and blueprints of the production sets. Unlike most other films, Kani did not hire illustrators for the packaging cover and instead used the film poster designed by Qiu, which Pearl Chan, the co-founder of Kani, explained was meant to honour Qiu's profession as a visual artist.

=== Censorship ===
A New Old Play, like all of Qiu Jiongjiong's previous documentaries, was unable to obtain a film public screening permit from the China Film Administration, which prevented its official release in China and only unauthorised private screenings were held in the country from 2021 to 2022. Une Cinema De Vent, the non-profit organisation managing these private screenings, stated that the production team wanted to avoid self-censorship regarding content and therefore adopted an approach to screen the film globally by contacting various distributors to host single-time private screenings. Filmmaker Geling Yan, while discussing film censorship in China, cited A New Old Play as an example of the growing discontent among filmmakers regarding censorship, and referred to its unauthorised screenings as an alternative approach to filmmaking, distinct from simply shifting production outside the country.

== Reception ==
A New Old Play's critical reception was positive, with Liberty Times referring to it as "critically acclaimed". On the review aggregator website Rotten Tomatoes, 100% of 9 critics' reviews are positive, with an average rating of 8.5/10. As of August 2022, the film held a rating of 9.0/10 on the Chinese media review platform Douban, for which the International Examiner described the score as "well received".

Austin Considine of The New York Times described A New Old Play as a "magnificently layered historical epic", combining "tragedy and farce" with the "artificial" mise-en-scène, while infusing humour into a narrative that grapples with the "absurdities and indignities" of life amidst the turmoil of Chinese history. Film Threat's Calan Panchoo rated the film 8.5/10, praising its "astonishing imagination" in combining art and history through a "salient" presentation achieved with "beautifully realized" production design, "wickedly puckish humor", and a "wonderful visual suggestion" that balances realism and surrealism, resulting in a "multilayered" exploration of history and memory in contemporary Chinese history.

Richard Brody at The New Yorker found the story to be a "daringly and imaginatively" dramatised account of 20th-century Chinese political history, presenting a highly personal and intimate portrayal of a small theatre company amid ongoing film censorship in China, employing theatrical techniques and "archly ironic methods" to "[tell] this story with affecting intimacy and candid observation". Marta Bałaga, writing for Cineuropa, called the film an "extraordinary" epic saga that, despite its "demanding" narrative richness and complex themes, remains a "pleasure, frequently humorous and always tender" exploration of the Sichuan opera performers' lives amidst China's political turmoil, which shows director Qiu Jiongjiong having "a lot of affection" for the art form. Stéphane Gobbo of Le Temps also acknowledged the film's "wonderful homage" to traditional Chinese theatre and early cinema through its production design, noting that "[e]ven if all the references to Chinese history aren't immediately apparent", it is "carried by a captivating epic sweep".

InReview's Ryan Swen regarded the film as a "rich and complex contribution to the Chinese folk tradition", comparing it to The Travelling Players (1975) and Platform (2000) for their shared use of theatrical performances to depict history, while lauding its mixture of theatricality and stylisation that creates an "intimate and aggregative" portrait of a clown's journey through 20th-century history, ultimately celebrating the artistry of theatre amidst the inevitability of historical change and uncertainties. Wang Xia, on the other hand, noted similarities between the film and the works of Roy Andersson in her review for China Film News, commending the "decent" and surrealistic production designs that connect to paintings, poetry, and theatre, while acknowledging the use of traditional theatrical performance's fictional elements to explore over half a century of Chinese history, "ingeniously balancing the absurd and the profound" in its reflection on themes of dignity, humour, and the interconnectedness of life and death.

== Awards and nominations ==
Year	Award	Category	Nominee	Result	Ref.
2021	74th Locarno Film Festival	Golden Leopard	—N/a	Nominated	
2021	74th Locarno Film Festival	Special Jury Prize	—N/a	Won	
2021	14th Asia Pacific Screen Awards	Best Cinematographer	Robbin Feng	Nominated	
2021	18th Yerevan International Film Festival	Golden Apricot	—N/a	Special Mention	
2021	47th Three Continents Festival	Montgolfière d'Or	—N/a	Nominated	
2021	47th Three Continents Festival	Prix du jury	—N/a	Won	
2021	32nd Singapore International Film Festival	Silver Screen Award	—N/a	Nominated	
2022	46th Hong Kong International Film Festival	Firebird Award (Chinese-language)	—N/a	Won	
2022	46th Hong Kong International Film Festival	FIPRESCI Prize	—N/a	Won	
