= The Sacred Spirit =

- Film poster
- Spanish: Espíritu sagrado
- Directed by: Chema García Ibarra
- Written by: Chema García Ibarra
- Starring: Nacho Fernández; Llum Arques; Joanna Valverde; Rocío Ibáñez
- Cinematography: Ion de Sosa
- Edited by: Ana Pfaff
- Production companies: Apellániz & De Sosa; Jaibo Films; La Fábrica Nocturna Cinèma; Teferruat Films
- Distributed by: La Aventura
- Release dates: 10 August 2021 (Locarno); 26 November 2021 (Spain)
- Countries: Spain; France; Turkey
- Language: Spanish

The Sacred Spirit (Spanish: Espíritu sagrado) is a 2021 tragicomedy film playing with science fiction themes directed and written by Chema García Ibarra. The cast is led by Nacho Fernández, Llum Arques, Joanna Valverde and Rocío Ibáñez. It is a Spain–France–Turkey international co-production.

== Plot ==
Primarily set in Elche, the fiction tracks the members of an association of ufologists that see their secret mankind-changing master plan imperiled after their leader dies. Meanwhile, everyone else is looking for a missing girl.

== Cast ==
- Nacho Fernández as José Manuel
- Llum Arqués as Verónica
- Joanna Valverde as Charo
- Rocío Ibáñez as Carmina
- José Ángel Asensio as Julio
- Ainara Paredes as Andrea
- David Terol
- Gorka Tszyu
- Antonio Vicente Boix
- Vicente Piqueres
- María Dolores Molina
- Isabel Matute
- Irene Santos
- Lorena Iglesias
- Ana Rubio
- José Miguel Sánchez

== Production ==
A joint Spain–France–Turkey co-production, the film was produced by Apellániz & De Sosa and Jaibo Films alongside La Fábrica Nocturna Cinèma and Teferruat Films, with the participation of Movistar+, À Punt Mèdia, RTVE and TRT, support and help from the IVC, ICAA, the Turkish Ministry of Culture and Tourism, CNC Cinema du Monde and Eurimages. Filming began on 12 October 2020 in Elche.

== Release ==
The Sacred Spirit had its world premiere at the 74th Locarno Film Festival (LFF) on 10 August 2021. The film was also presented in October 2021 at the Toulouse Spanish Film Festival and on 8 November 2021 at the 18th Seville European Film Festival (SEFF). Distributed by La Aventura, it was theatrically released in Spain on 26 November 2021.

Arrow Films inked UK rights for the film whereas HBO Europe acquired rights to the film for its European territories for a HBO Max release.

== Reception ==
The American review-aggregation website Rotten Tomatoes recorded a 93% approval rating, with an average score of 7.9/10, based on 14 reviews.

Jay Weissberg of Variety considered the "puckish" debut full-length film imagining dark goings-on among UFO believers to be a "an immaculately framed feature generating uneasy amusement in the viewer".

== Accolades ==
Year	Award	Category	Nominee(s)	Result	Ref.
2021	4th Berlanga Awards	Best Feature Film		Won	
2021	4th Berlanga Awards	Best Director	Chema García Ibarra	Nominated	
2021	4th Berlanga Awards	Best Screenplay	Chema García Ibarra	Won	
2021	4th Berlanga Awards	Best Leading Actor	Nacho Fernández	Nominated	
2021	4th Berlanga Awards	Best Art Direction	Leonor Díaz	Nominated	
2021	4th Berlanga Awards	Best Production Supervision	Miguel Molina	Nominated	
2022	9th Feroz Awards	Best Drama Film		Nominated	
2022	9th Feroz Awards	Arrebato Award (Fiction)		Won	
2022	Spanish Screenwriters' Union Awards	Best Screenplay in a Comedy Feature Film	Chema García Ibarra	Nominated	
2022	48th Seattle International Film Festival		Special Jury Prize for Originality of Vision (Ibero-American competition)	Won	

== See also ==
- List of Spanish films of 2021
