= When We Were Bullies =

2021 short documentary film by Jay Rosenblatt

- Promotional release poster
- Directed by: Jay Rosenblatt
- Written by: Jay Rosenblatt
- Produced by: Jay Rosenblatt
- Starring: Richard J. Silberg; Mark Athitakis; Wendy Newman; Bobbe Bromberg
- Cinematography: Kirsten Johnson; Ellie McCutcheon; Jay Rosenblatt
- Edited by: Jay Rosenblatt
- Music by: Erik Ian Walker
- Animation by: Jeremy Rourke
- Production companies: Locomotion Films; Stefilm International; Arte Deutschland TV; ZDF
- Distributed by: Gonella Productions; ARTE
- Release date: January 28, 2021 (Sundance)
- Running time: 36 minutes
- Countries: United States; Germany
- Language: English

When We Were Bullies is a 2021 short documentary film written, directed, produced, and edited by Jay Rosenblatt.

== Summary ==
Rosenblatt tries to track down his fifth grade teacher, and remembers a bullying incident that he was part of 50 years ago (despite not interviewing the victim of said incident), alongside remembering his younger brother's death from colitis surgery.

== Release and reception ==
It premiered at the 2021 Sundance Film Festival. before airing on HBO March 30.

The Washington Post called it "a deeply personal essay".

=== Accolades ===
94th Academy Awards: Academy Award for Best Documentary (Short Subject) – nomination
