= How Do You Measure a Year? =

2021 short documentary film by Jay Rosenblatt

- Official poster
- Directed by: Jay Rosenblatt
- Produced by: Jay Rosenblatt
- Starring: Ella Rosenblatt
- Cinematography: Thomas Logoreci; Jay Rosenblatt
- Edited by: Jay Rosenblatt
- Distributed by: Submarine
- Release date: 13 August 2021 (Locarno)
- Running time: 29 minutes
- Country: United States
- Language: English

How Do You Measure a Year? is a 2021 American short documentary film directed by Jay Rosenblatt. The documentary film is about a father–daughter relationship. The title comes from lyrics of the track "Seasons of Love" from the 1996 Pulitzer Prize–winning musical Rent. The film was nominated for the 95th Academy Awards in Academy Award for Best Documentary Short Film category. It was also screened in August 2021 at the 74th Locarno Film Festival.

== Summary ==
The documentary is about the relationship of a father and his daughter via home movies. The father films his daughter every year on her birthday, asking the same questions. The girl goes from a toddler to a young woman with all the beautiful and awkward stages in between while the father-daughter relationship evolves in all its complexities.

== Cast ==
- Ella Rosenblatt
- Jay Rosenblatt

== Release ==
The film had its world premiere on August 13, 2021 at the 74th Locarno Film Festival. Prior to that, the film was screened at the 62nd Kraków Film Festival, which took place from 29 May to 12 June 2022 in Kraków, Poland. It won the Golden Dragon award for the best short film in the festival.

== Reception ==
Chris Esper, writing in Film Threat, graded the film 9/10 and opined that the film records life and time uniquely and beautifully. Esper, praising the film, stated, "A home movie that leaves the viewer with a big grin and perhaps even reflective on their own life."

== Accolades ==
It was selected for the Academy Award for Best Documentary Short Film and subsequently shortlisted and nominated for the 95th Academy Awards in said category.

Award	Date of ceremony	Category	Recipient(s)	Result	Ref.
It's All True – International Documentary Film Festival	10 April 2022	Best Documentary in the International Competition: Short Films	How Do You Measure a Year?	Won	
Documenta Madrid 2022	7 May 2022	Audience Award	How Do You Measure a Year?	Won	
Kraków Film Festival	11 June 2022	Golden Dragon for Best Short Film	How Do You Measure a Year?	Won	
Academy Awards	12 March 2023	Best Documentary Short Film	How Do You Measure a Year?	Nominated	

== See also ==
- Anna: 6–18 (1994) – a feature film using the same concept, by Russian director Nikita Mikhalkov
- Rent – the title comes from a lyric from the 1996 musical
