= Human Remains (film) =

- Directed by: Jay Rosenblatt
- Written by: Jay Rosenblatt
- Distributed by: Locomotion Films
- Release date: 1998
- Countries: United States; Denmark

Human Remains is a 1998 Danish-American documentary short film written and directed by filmmaker Jay Rosenblatt.

== Summary ==
It reveals every intimate and mundane detail about the personal lives of Adolf Hitler, Benito Mussolini, Joseph Stalin, Francisco Franco and Mao Zedong while illustrating the banality of evil.

== Production ==
Even though it is only a 30-minute film, it took Jay Rosenblatt 3 years to complete it with eight months of research.

== Accolades ==
The film has won over 27 awards including a Sundance Jury Award.
