= Special Jury Prize (Locarno International Film Festival) =

Award given to Second best film at the Locarno Film Festival

- Awarded for: Runner-up film
- Country: Switzerland
- Presented by: Locarno International Film Festival
- First award: 1949
- Currently held by: The Riverbank by Matheus Farias and Enock Carvalho

The Special Jury Prize award is given annually at the Locarno Film Festival to the second best feature film in the Main Competition (Concorso Internazionale).

Among its winners are: Vittorio De Sica, Pedro Costa, Ryan Fleck, Nadav Lapid, and Radu Jude.

== History ==
Vittorio De Sica was the award first winner for Bicycle Thieves (1949) at the festival's 4th edition. But the prize went into a hiatus of eighteen years until 1968. After the 21st edition, the prize stayed another thirty years in hiatus. Since the 53rd edition in 2000, the prize is award regularly.

== Winners ==
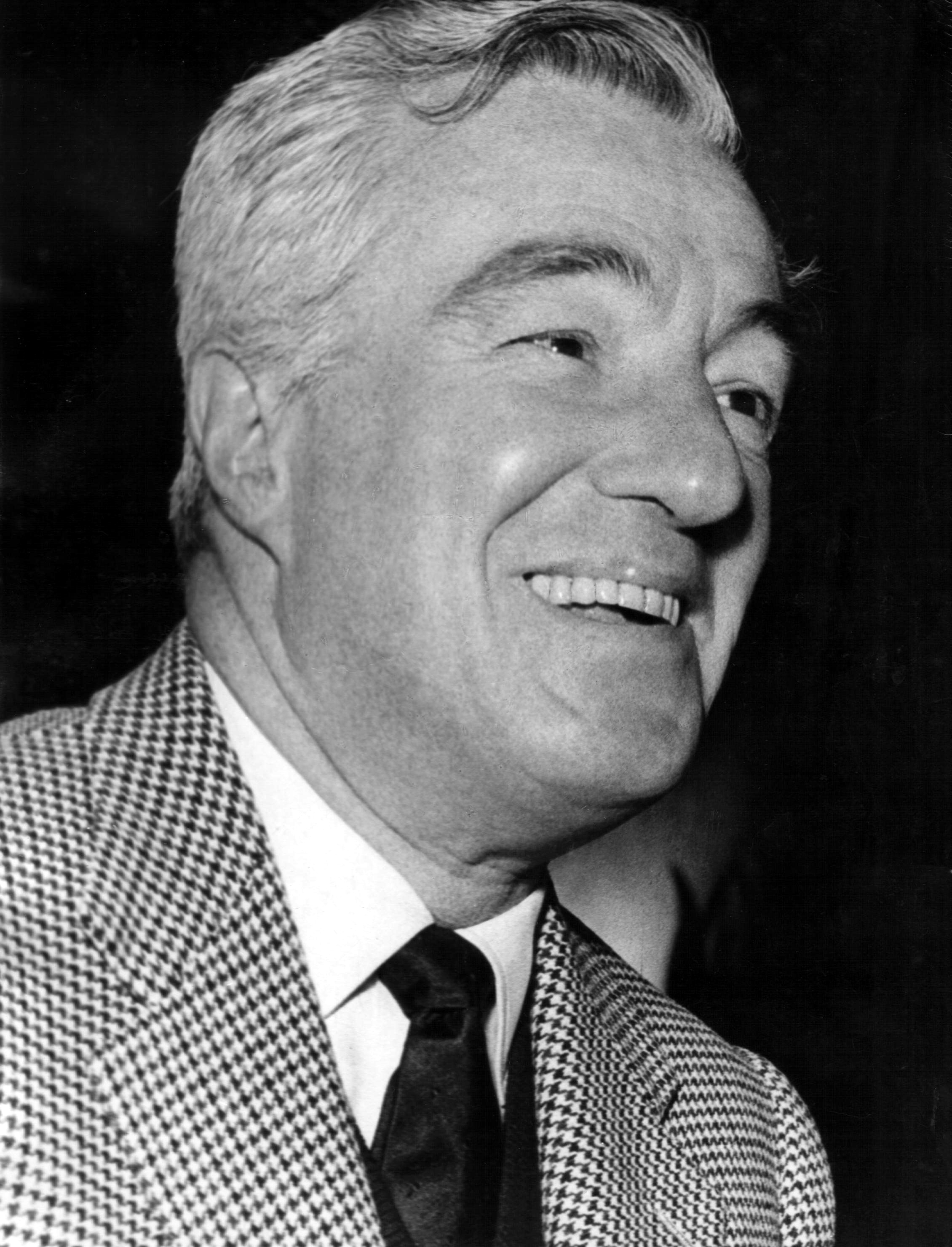
Vittorio De Sica won in 1949.

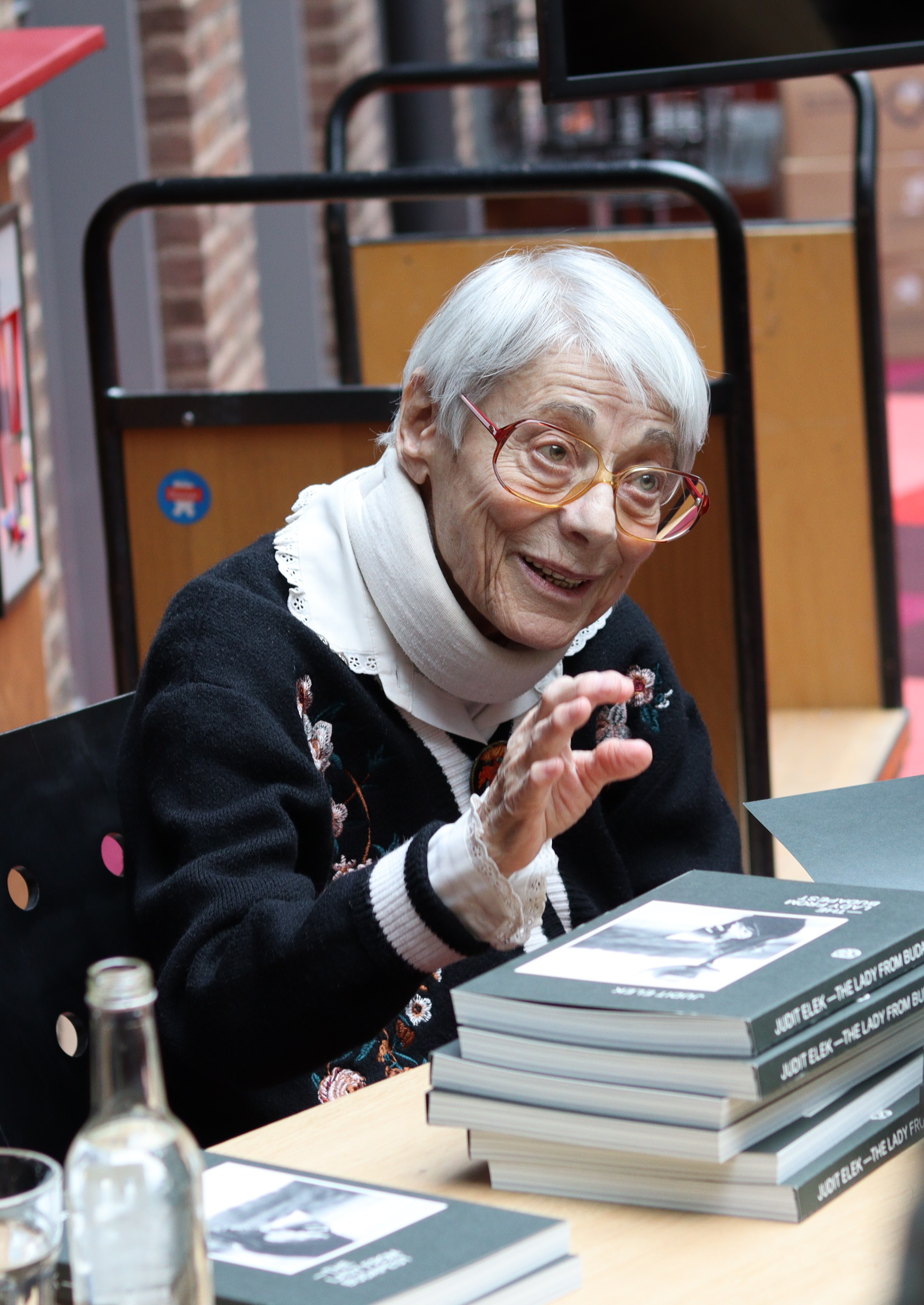
Judit Elek won in 1968.

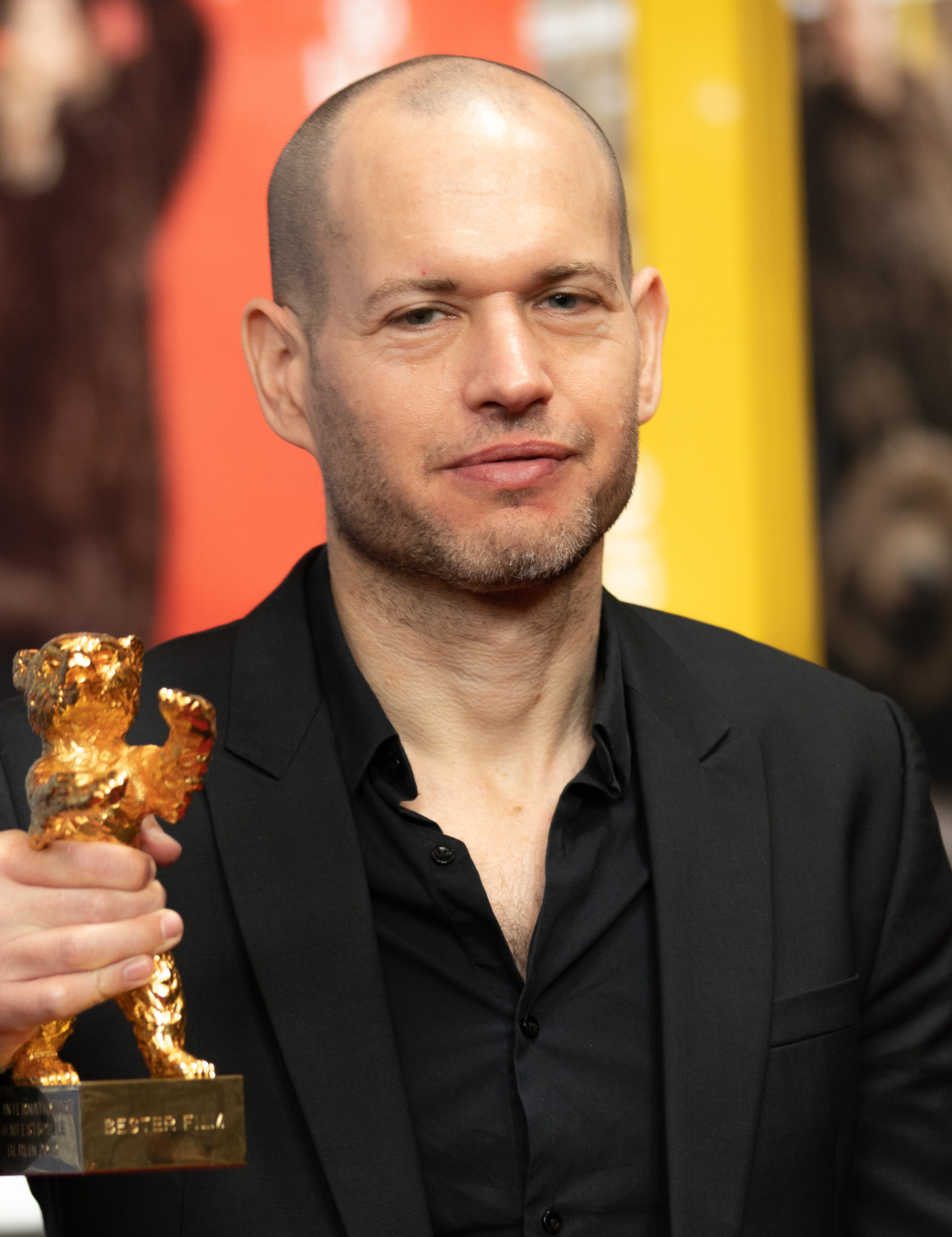
Nadav Lapid won in 2011.

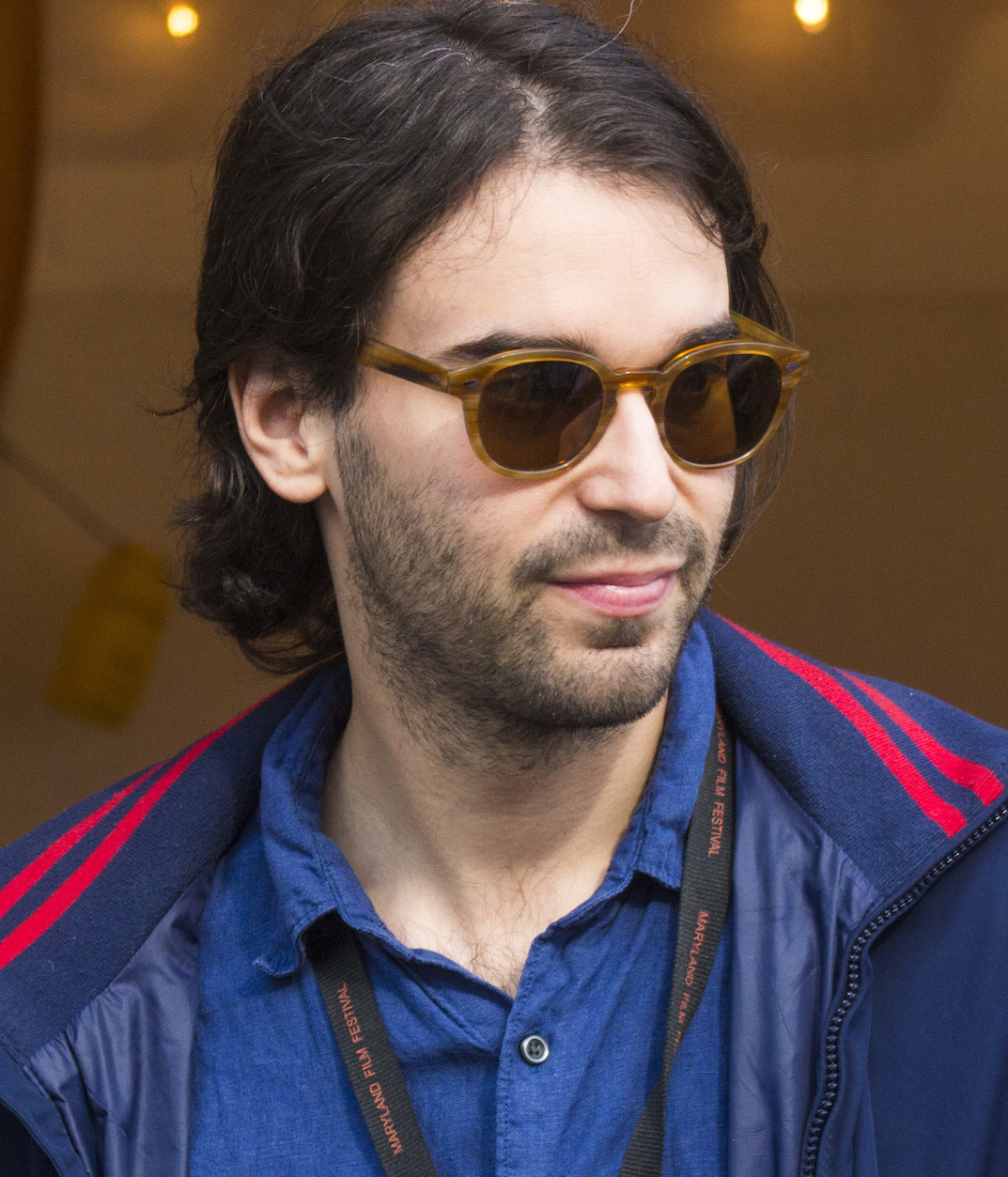
Alex Ross Perry won in 2014.

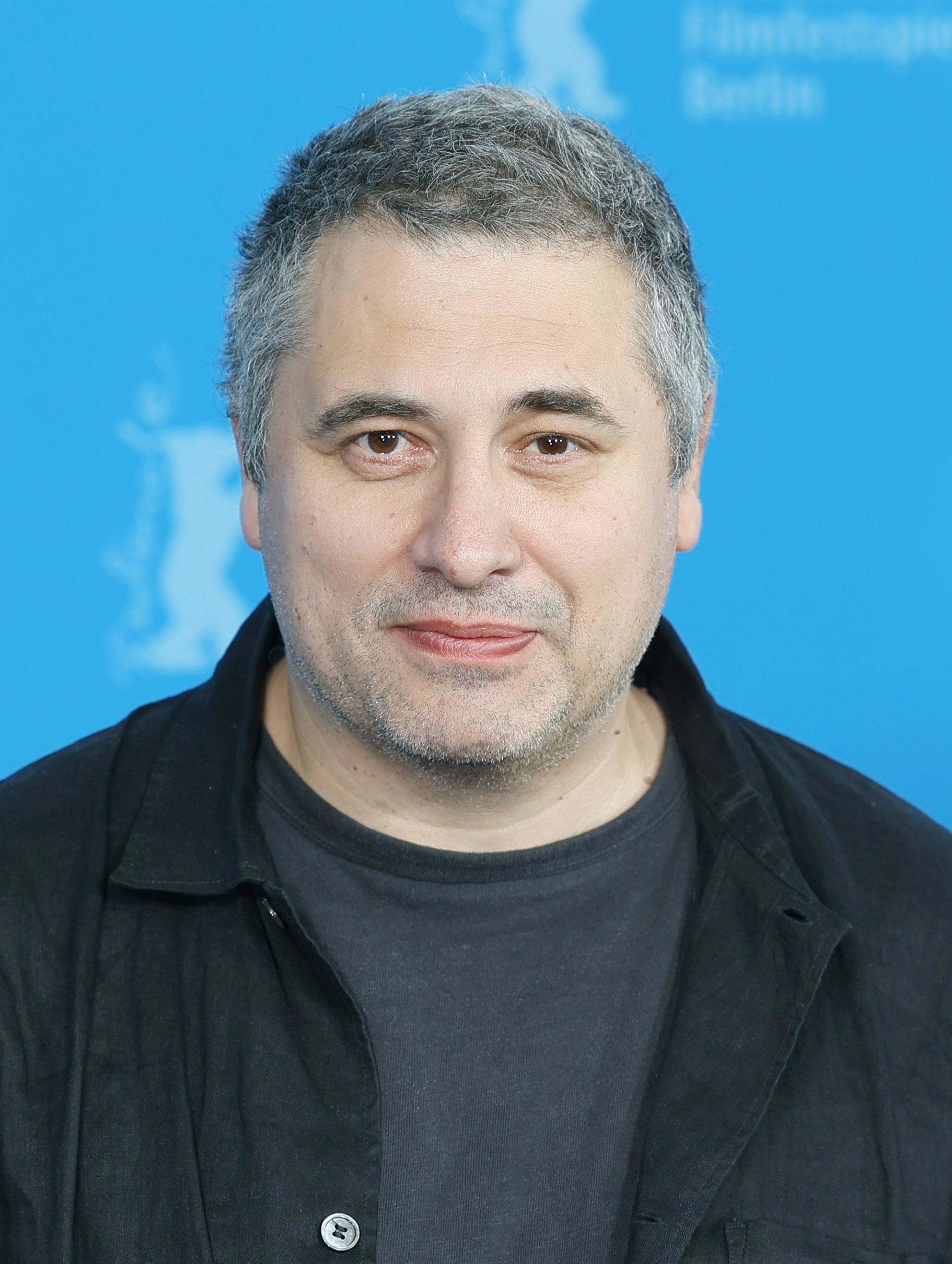
Radu Jude won twice, in 2016 and 2023.

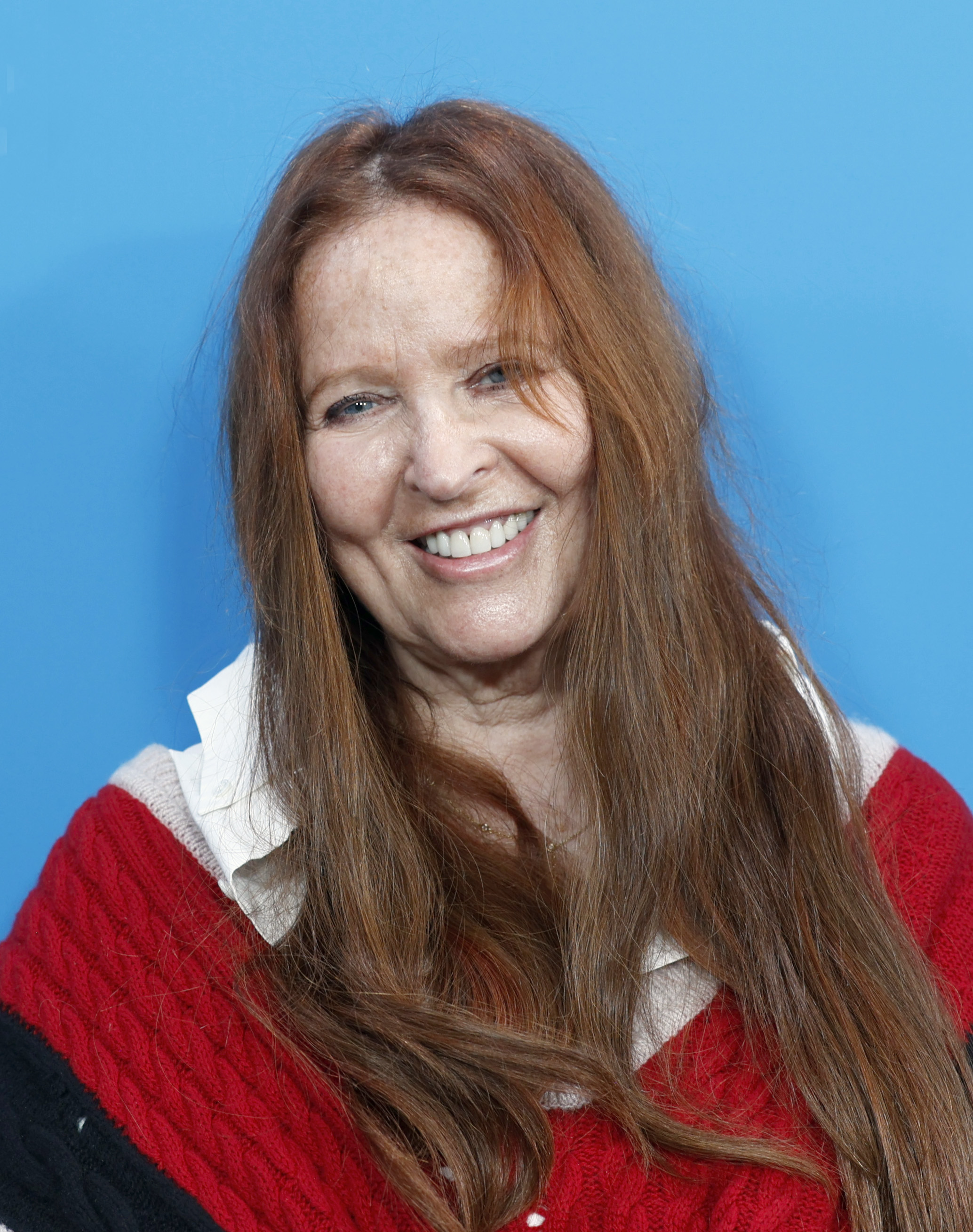
Yolande Zauberman won in 2018.

=== 1940s ===
Year	English Title	Original Title	Director(s)	Production Country
1949	Bicycle Thieves	Ladri di biciclette	Vittorio De Sica	Italy
1950 - 1968: No Award Given

=== 1960s ===
Year	English Title	Original Title	Director(s)	Production Country
1968	How Long Does a Man Live?	Meddig él az ember? I-II	Judit Elek	Hungary
1969 - 1999: No Award Given

=== 2000s ===
Year	English Title	Original Title	Director(s)	Production Country
2000	Gostanza da Libbiano		Paolo Benvenuti	Italy
2001	Delbaran		Abolfazl Jalili	Japan, Iran
2002	I'm Taraneh, 15	من ترانه، ۱۵ سال دارم	Rasul Sadr Ameli	Iran
2003	Maria		Călin Peter Netzer	Romania
2004	Tony Takitani	トニー滝谷	Jun Ichikawa	Japan
2005	A Perfect Couple	Un couple parfait	Nobuhiro Suwa	France, Japan
2006	Half Nelson		Ryan Fleck	United States
2007	Memories		Pedro Costa, Harun Farocki and Eugène Green	South Korea, France
2008	33 Scenes from Life	33 sceny z zycia	Małgorzata Szumowska	Germany, Poland
2009	Tambourine, Drum	Бубен, барабан	Aleksei Mizgiryov	Russia

=== 2010s ===
Year	English Title	Original Title	Director(s)	Production Country
2010	Morgen		Marian Crișan	Romania
2011	Policeman	השוטר	Nadav Lapid	Israel
2012	Somebody Up There Likes Me		Bob Byington	United States
2013	What Now? Remind Me	E Agora? Lembra-me	Joaquim Pinto	Portugal
2014	Listen Up Philip		Alex Ross Perry	United States
2015	Tikkun		Avishai Sivan	Israel
2016	Scarred Hearts	Inimi cicatrizate	Radu Jude	Romania, Germany
2017	Good Manners	As Boas Maneiras	Juliana Rojas and Marco Dutra	Brazil, France
2018	M		Yolande Zauberman	France
2019	Height of the Wave	파고	Park Jung-bum	South Korea

=== 2020s ===
Year	English Title	Original Title	Director(s)	Production Country
2021	A New Old Play	椒麻堂會	Qiu Jiongjiong	Hong Kong, France
2022	The Adventures of Gigi the Law	Gigi la legge	Alessandro Comodin	Italy, France, Belgium
2023	Do Not Expect Too Much from the End of the World	Nu astepta prea mult de la sfârsitul lumii	Radu Jude	Romania
2024	Moon	Mond	Kurdwin Ayub	Austria
2025	White Snail		Elsa Kremser and Levin Peter	Austria, Germany
2026	The Riverbank	A Margem do Rio	Matheus Farias and Enock Carvalho	Brazil, Germany
