= Fan Kuang-yao =

Taiwanese actor

- Born: 3 May 1975 (age 51); Taipei, Taiwan
- Other name: Fan Guang-yao
- Education: Taipei Hwa Kang Arts School; Chinese Culture University
- Occupations: Actor; Xiangsheng performer
- Years active: 1990–present
- Spouse: Liu Wei-ling (m. 2007)

Chinese name
- Chinese: 樊光耀
Transcriptions
Standard Mandarin
- Hanyu Pinyin: Fán Guāngyào
Yue: Cantonese
- Jyutping: Faan4 Gwong1 Jiu6
Southern Min
- Hokkien POJ: Hoân Kong-iāu

Fan Kuang-yao (born 3 May 1975) is a Taiwanese actor and xiangsheng performer. He has been nominated for three Golden Bell Awards and won once in 2005.

== Selected filmography ==
- Lust, Caution (2007)
- Night Market Hero (2011)
- Amour et Pâtisserie (2013)
- Endless Nights in Aurora (2014)
- A Touch of Green (2015)
- Where the Wind Settles (2015)
- 10,000 Miles (2016)
- I Am the Secret in Your Heart (2024)
- Fuxi: Joy in Four Chapters (2026)
