= Fuxi: Joy in Four Chapters =

2026 film by Qiu Jiongjiong

- Promotional poster
- Traditional Chinese: 腹喜
- Simplified Chinese: 腹喜
- Directed by: Qiu Jiongjiong
- Screenplay by: Qiu Jiongjiong
- Produced by: Ningyuan Ding; David Tang; Jin Zhao
- Starring: Lee Kang-sheng; Darren Wang; Annie Chen; Lee Hong-chi; Fan Kuang-yao
- Edited by: Qiu Jiongjiong; Xinzhu Liu; Chen Xu
- Production companies: Uluka Studio; Midnight Blur Films
- Release date: 29 October 2026 (TIFF)
- Running time: 135 minutes
- Countries: Hong Kong; Taiwan; Japan; Saudi Arabia; Qatar
- Languages: Chinese; Sichuanese
- Budget: US$1.2 million

Fuxi: Joy in Four Chapters (Chinese: 腹喜) is a 2026 drama fantasy film co-written and directed by Qiu Jiongjiong. Starring Lee Kang-sheng, it follows fantasy narrative centered on food and feasting, set in four different eras, over 4,000 years ago to 1990s.

The film had its World Premiere at the 39th Tokyo International Film Festival on 29 October 2026 in International competition.

== Synopsis ==
The film is divided into four stories inspired by mythology, legends, literature, and folk tales from Sichuan, China, with food and traditional banquets serving as a common theme. The first story takes place at a funeral feast more than 4,000 years ago, where an elderly grandmother cuts off her own tail and leaves it to her descendants. The second is set during the Spring Festival more than 3,000 years ago and follows a former king who returns as a cuckoo bird but is left alone while others celebrate. The third takes place at a Mid-Autumn Festival banquet in the 1990s, where spirits gather to honour an ancient poet known for his love of food and the hardships he endured. The final story follows a homeless child who encounters underworld deities at a birthday feast about a century ago, leading him to reflect on the mysteries of life and the uncertainty of death.

== Cast ==
- Lee Kang-sheng
- Darren Wang
- Annie Chen
- Lee Hong-chi
- Fan Kuang-yao

== Production ==
Production of the film began in October 2024, with cast of Lee Kang-sheng, Darren Wang, Annie Chen, Lee Hong-chi, and Fan Kuang-yao.

In March 2025, the under production film was for Hong Kong Project Market. The film with a budget of US$1.2 million had arranged 70% of the financing at that time.

In April 2025, the film was selected for 7th edition of Fantastic 7, where it was presented in the Palais K room of the Palais des Festivals et des Congrès in Cannes on 18 May. In July 2025, the film won the Mocha Chai Awarde at 29th Bucheon International Fantastic Film Festival which entitled it for receiving post-production support worth US$35,000.

In January 2026, the film received grant from Qatar's Doha Film Institute in Non-Middle East and North Africa (MENA) – Feature Narrative – Post-Production category under its 2025 Falls Grant Cycle. It was also selected in Picture Lock – Feature Narrative at Doha Film Institute in its 2026 Qumra development lab, which took place virtually from 27 March to 8 April 2026.

== Release ==
Fuxi: Joy in Four Chapters was screened for the World Premiere on 29 October 2026 in the Competition section of the 39th Tokyo International Film Festival.

== Accolades ==
Award	Date of ceremony	Category	Recipient	Result	Ref.
Tokyo International Film Festival	4 November 2026	Tokyo Grand Prix	Fuxi: Joy in Four Chapters	Nominated	
