= Morgen (film) =

- Promotional release poster
- Directed by: Marian Crișan
- Written by: Marian Crișan
- Produced by: Anca Puiu
- Starring: András Hatházi; Yilmaz Yalcin; Elvira Rimbu
- Cinematography: Tudor Mircea
- Edited by: Tudor Pojoni
- Release date: 7 August 2010 (Locarno)
- Running time: 100 minutes
- Country: Romania
- Languages: Romanian; Hungarian; Turkish
- Budget: €790,000 (estimated)

Morgen is a 2010 Romanian drama film written and directed by Marian Crișan, "a low-key satire that takes a droll approach to the serious subject of illegal immigration".

== Plot ==
Nelu, a man in his forties, works as a security guard in a local supermarket in the Romanian border town of Salonta. His life is uneventful: fishing at dawn, work during the day, and home with his wife in the evening. They live alone in the outskirts of the town and their main problem is repairing the old roof of their farmhouse. One morning, while fishing, Nelu meets a Turkish man trying to evade capture by the border guards. Nelu takes the stranger, desperate for help, to the farmhouse, gives him some dry clothes, food and shelter, although he doesn’t really know how to help him cross the border. When his wife discovers the foreigner living in the cellar she insists he get rid of him, but he does not report the stranger to the authorities and puts him to work on his dilapidated farm. The Turkish man keeps insisting Nelu take all his money and help him reach Germany. Eventually, Nelu takes the money and promises he will help him cross the border the next day, reassuring him with the one word the Turkish man knows in German: "morgen" ("tomorrow").

== Cast ==
- András Hatházi as Nelu
- Yilmaz Yalcin as Behran
- Elvira Rimbu as Florica
- Dorin C. Zachei as Daniel
- Razvan Vicoveanu as Mircea - Border Police
- 'Kecske' Levente Molnár as Ovidiu - Border Police

== Awards ==
The movie received four awards at the Locarno Film Festival:

- the Special Jury Prize
- Prize of the Ecumenical Jury
- an award from the Youth Jury
- the Don Quijote award from the International Cineclub Foundation

It also received three awards at the Thessaloniki Film Festival and two more at the CinEast Festival in Luxembourg, as well as being designated the best Romanian feature film at the 2011 Transilvania International Film Festival.

On 3 August, Romania's National Centre for Cinematography announced that Morgen would be the country's pick for the Best Foreign Film category of the 84th Academy Awards, but it did not make the final shortlist.

== See also ==
- Romanian New Wave
- Cinema of Romania
- List of submissions to the 84th Academy Awards for Best Foreign Language Film
- List of Romanian submissions for the Academy Award for Best Foreign Language Film
