= Qiu Jiongjiong =

Chinese filmmaker (born 1977)

Qiu Jiongjiong (Chinese: 邱炯炯, born 1977 in Sichuan, China) is a Chinese contemporary artist and filmmaker based in Shenzhen, China.

Born in 1977 in Leshan, Sichuan Province in central China, Qiu Jiongjiong went on to work in Beijing until 2017, and now currently lives and works in Shenzhen, China.

Qiu Jiongjiong predominantly works with paint and film in his pieces. He has participated in multiple exhibitions and art fairs both locally in China and internationally. His films have been praised as giving a raw narrative of Chinese society and an unbiased approach to modern Chinese political topics.

== Background ==
Qiu Jiongjiong was born in Leshan, Sichuan Province of China in 1977. His grandfather, a famous Sichuan Opera performer, introduced him to painting at the age of two and he began performing local opera at the age of three. At the age of 18 he left school to pursue his art.

Qiu Jiongjiong considers his unique upbringing to have played a role in making him somewhat of an eccentric in the art community.

From Leshan, Sichuan Qiu Jiongjiong moved to Beijing where he is represented by Star Gallery. He has shown in public spaces including the Ullens Center for Contemporary Art in Beijing and most recently at ART021 Shanghai Contemporary Art Fair.

He now lives in Shenzhen with his wife and is represented in China through Star Gallery.

== Awards ==
2021 - 2022

A New Old Play

Special Jury Prize, Locarno International Film Festival

Firebird Award, FIPRESCI Prize, Hong Kong International Film Festival

The Young Jury Award, Three Continents Festival

2012

Emerging Award, The 1st Yifeng Festival, Beijing, China

2011

My Mother's Rhapsody, "Best Top 10" Prize, The 8th China Independent Film Festival / RCM Art Museum, Nanjing, China

2010

Madame, "Best Top 10" Prize, The 7th China Independent Film Festival / RCM Art Museum, Nanjing, China

2008

The Moon Palace, "Best Top 10" Prize, The 5th China Independent Film Festival / RCM Art Museum, Nanjing, China

== Filmography ==
- The Moon Palace (2007)
- Ode to Joy (2008)
- A Portrait of Mr. Huang (2009)
- Madame (2010)
- My Mother's Rhapsody (2011)
- Mr. Zhang Believes (2015)
- A New Old Play (2021)
- Fuxi: Joy in Four Chapters (2026)

== Publications ==
- The 3rd Qiu Jiongjiong Art Festival 《第三届邱炯炯艺术节》 (2016)
- Betrayal - The Story of Zhang 《痴》 (2014)
- The 2nd Qiu Jiongjiong Art Festival 《第二届邱炯炯艺术节》(2013)
- The Swelling of Time - A Report on Films by Qiu Jiongjiong: Phase One 《浮肿的光阴：邱炯炯影片第一阶段报告》 (2012)
- 1st Qiu Jiongjiong Art Festival 《第一届邱炯炯艺术节》(2010)
- Comedy of Youth《怯青春》 (2008)
