= Jay Rosenblatt (filmmaker) =

American documentary filmmaker

Jay Rosenblatt (born 1955) is an American experimental documentary filmmaker known for his work in the field of collage film since 1980.

== Themes ==
His films explore human emotional, personal and psychological cores (e.g.: the private lives of Hitler and Stalin in Human Remains, growing up male in The Smell of Burning Ants).

== Filmography ==
- The Smell of Burning Ants (1994)
- Human Remains (1998)
- Nine Lives: The Eternal Moment of Now (2001)
- Worm (2001)
- Prayer (2002)
- Phantom Limb (2005)
- Afraid So (2006)
- I Just Wanted to Be Somebody (2006)
- The Darkness of Day (2009)
- The D Train (2011)
- When We Were Bullies (2021)
- How Do You Measure a Year? (2022)

== Accolades ==
- Sundance Jury Award for Human Remains
- 94th Academy Awards: Academy Award for Best Documentary (Short Subject) – nomination for When We Were Bullies
- 95th Academy Awards: Academy Award for Best Documentary (Short Subject) – nomination for How Do You Measure a Year?
