= Crowd scene =

Artistic setting

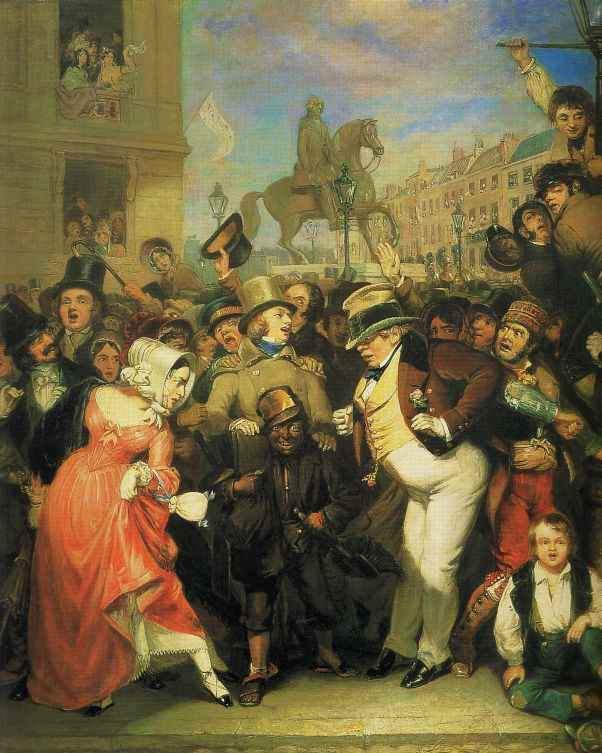
The Crowd by Robert William Buss (1847)

A crowd scene is the representation of a crowd in art, literature or other media.

There are many examples of crowd scenes in American literature. One classic is Poe's short story, "The Man of the Crowd", in which a mysterious old man is followed through London in the 19th century, when it was the most populous city in the world.

== See also ==
- Crowd simulation
- Walla
