= Chema García Ibarra =

Spanish filmmaker

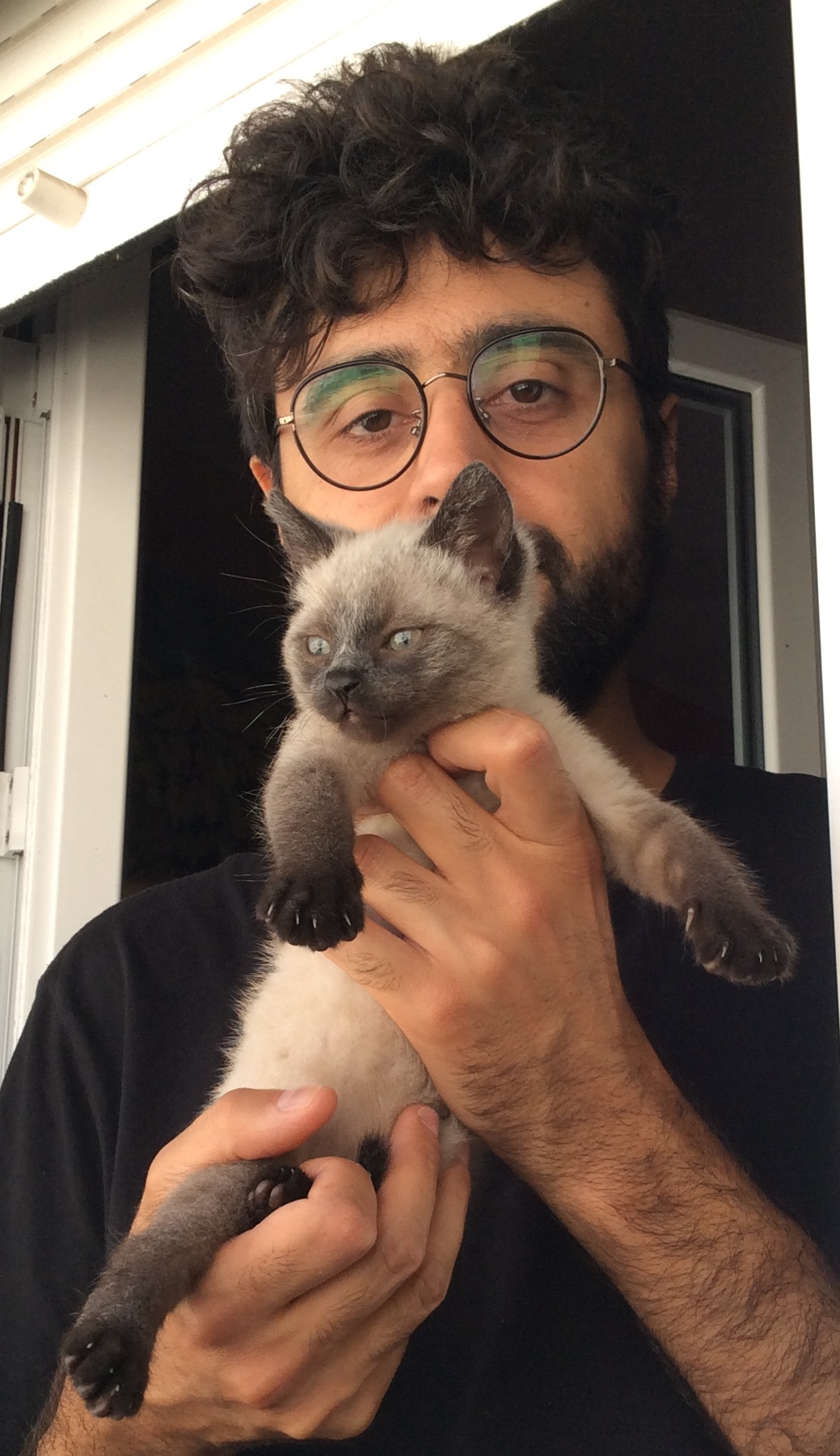
- Ibarra in 2018
- Born: 1980 (age 45–46); Elche, Valencian Community, Spain
- Education: University of Alicante
- Occupation: Filmmaker
- Years active: 2008–present
- Website: http://www.chemagarcia.com

Chema García Ibarra is a Spanish filmmaker.

== Career ==
His first short film The Attack of the Robots from Nebula-5 became one of the most awarded films of 2009 with more than 110 awards and 350 selections including the Directors' Fortnight, Sundance, Chicago, Ann Arbor and Winterthur. After getting the preselection to the Oscars and the Goya, he won the Méliès de Oro for the best European fantastic short film.

In 2010 he wrote, produced and directed Protoparticles, winner of an honourable mention at the Sundance Festival among other awards.

His short film Mystery, whose screenplay won the Project Corto Canal + award at the Gijón International Film Festival, had its international premiere at the Berlinale where he got the EFA nomination.

In 2016, his short film The Disco Shines won first prize at the Alcalá de Henares Film Festival.

The Golden Legend (co-directed with Ion de Sosa) premiered at the Berlinale in 2019.

Retrospectives of his work have been held in Atlanta, Mexico City, Brest and Glasgow.

He teaches anti-filmmaking at ECAM, covering the fusion between fiction and reality, narrative limits and the radical use of staging, sound, music and editing.

== Filmography ==
- The Sacred Spirit (2021)
- The Golden Legend / Leyenda dorada (2019)
- The Disco Shines / La disco resplandece (2016)
- Uranes (2014)
- Mystery / Misterio (2013)
- Protoparticles / Protopartículas (2009)
- The Attack of the Robots from Nebula-5 / El ataque de los robots de nebulosa-5 (2008)
